= 2017–18 Macedonian Third Football League =

Macedonian Third League
- Season: 2017–18

The 2017–18 Macedonian Third Football League was the 26th season of the third-tier football league in the Republic of Macedonia, since its establishment.

== North ==
=== Teams ===
Club	City / Town
Besa-Vlazrimi	Slupchane
Bratstvo-Vlaznimi	Sredno Konjari
Cementarnica 55	Kisela Voda, Skopje
Çair	Chair, Skopje
Fortuna	Chento, Skopje
Goblen	Kumanovo
Ilinden Skopje	Ilinden
Kadino	Kadino
Madjari Solidarost	Madjari, Skopje
Petrovec	Petrovec
SSK	Drachevo, Skopje
Studena Voda	Dobroshane
Volkovo	Volkovo

=== Table ===
Pos	Team	Pld	W	D	L	GF	GA	GD	Pts	Promotion or relegation
1	Goblen (Note: Goblen were deducted one point for fielding an ineligible player in Round 13.) (C, P)	24	17	3	4	75	38	+37	51	Promotion to Macedonian Second League
2	Kadino	24	12	6	6	46	30	+16	42	
3	Besa-Vlazrimi	24	13	1	10	49	45	+4	40	
4	Madjari Solidarost (Note: Madjari Solidarost were withdraw after the season.) (D, R)	24	11	5	8	43	36	+7	38	Relegation to Macedonian Municipal Leagues
5	Fortuna	24	12	2	10	54	53	+1	38	
6	SSK Nova	24	10	4	10	38	35	+3	34	
7	Ilinden Skopje	24	10	4	10	52	51	+1	34	
8	Bratstvo-Vlaznimi	24	10	4	10	42	41	+1	34	
9	Petrovec	24	11	1	12	43	54	−11	34	
10	Studena Voda	24	10	3	11	42	40	+2	33	
11	Volkovo	24	10	2	12	47	45	+2	32	
12	Çair (Note: Çair were deducted 3 points for not appearing at the Round 24 match.) (R)	24	5	4	15	20	45	−25	16	Relegation to Macedonian Municipal Leagues
13	Cementarnica 55 (Note: Cementarnica 55 were deducted 3 points for not appearing at the Round 21 match.) (R)	24	4	3	17	27	65	−38	12	Relegation to Macedonian Municipal Leagues

Source: MacedonianFootball.com
Rules for classification: 1) Points; 2) Head-to-head points; 3) Head-to-head goal difference; 4) Head-to-head away goals scored.
(C) Champions; (D) Disqualified; (P) Promoted; (R) Relegated

== Center ==
=== Teams ===
Club	City / Town
Babuna	Martolci
Bratstvo 07	Zhitoshe
Gaber	Vatasha
Golemo Konjari	Golemo Konjari
Ilinden (BS)	Bashino Selo
Marena	Marena
Mladost (K)	Krivogashtani
Napredok (KR)	Krusheani
Partizan	Obrshani
Pitu Guli	Krushevo
Prevalec	Veles
Rosoman 83	Rosoman
Sloga 1976	Lazhani
Vardar (N)	Negotino

=== Table ===
Pos	Team	Pld	W	D	L	GF	GA	GD	Pts	Promotion or relegation
1	Partizan Obrshani (C, P)	26	21	2	3	59	15	+44	65	Promotion to Macedonian Second League
2	Vardar Negotino (P)	26	20	4	2	64	17	+47	64	Promotion to Macedonian Second League
3	Babuna	26	18	1	7	71	34	+37	55	
4	Rosoman 83	26	15	4	7	53	35	+18	49	
5	Pitu Guli	26	15	3	8	47	27	+20	48	
6	Prevalec	26	14	4	8	55	34	+21	46	
7	Marena	26	10	5	11	49	54	−5	35	
8	Golemo Konjari	26	10	4	12	47	45	+2	34	
9	Bratstvo 07 Zhitoshe	26	7	8	11	37	38	−1	29	
10	Mladost 1930 Krivogashtani	26	7	4	15	31	63	−32	25	
11	Napredok Krusheani	26	6	6	14	28	56	−28	24	
12	Sloga 1976 Lazhani (R)	26	5	4	17	29	61	−32	19	Relegation to Macedonian Municipal Leagues
13	Ilinden Bashino Selo (R)	26	2	5	19	24	74	−50	11	Relegation to Macedonian Municipal Leagues
14	Gaber (Note: Gaber were deducted 3 points for fielding an ineligible player in Round 11.) (R)	26	2	6	18	23	64	−41	9	Relegation to Macedonian Municipal Leagues

Source: MacedonianFootball.com
Rules for classification: 1) Points; 2) Head-to-head points; 3) Head-to-head goal difference; 4) Head-to-head away goals scored.
(C) Champions; (P) Promoted; (R) Relegated

== Southeast ==
=== Teams ===
Club	City / Town
Akademija Kukla	Kuklish
Detonit Junior	Radovish
Dojransko Ezero	Nov Dojran
Mladost (U)	Udovo
Napredok (R)	Radovo
Partizan Bash	Bashibos
Spartmani	Gradsko Baldovci
Tiverija	Strumica
Vasilevo	Vasilevo

=== Table ===
Pos	Team	Pld	W	D	L	GF	GA	GD	Pts	Promotion or relegation
1	Detonit Junior (C, P)	23	21	1	1	92	21	+71	64	Promotion to Macedonian Second League
2	Vasilevo	23	18	1	4	89	31	+58	55	
3	Tiverija	23	14	1	8	65	34	+31	43	
4	Napredok Radovo (Note: Napredok Radovo were withdraw after the season.) (D, R)	22	13	1	8	58	35	+23	40	Relegation to Macedonian Municipal Leagues
5	Spartmani	23	7	3	13	42	46	−4	24	
6	Mladost Udovo	23	7	3	13	35	65	−30	24	
7	Dojransko Ezero	22	7	2	13	40	58	−18	23	
8	Akademija Kukla (R)	23	5	1	17	28	67	−39	16	Relegation to Macedonian Municipal Leagues
9	Partizan Bash (Note: Partizan Bash were expelled after round 16.) (D, R)	16	0	1	15	17	109	−92	1	Relegation to Macedonian Municipal Leagues

Source: MacedonianFootball.com
Rules for classification: 1) Points; 2) Head-to-head points; 3) Head-to-head goal difference; 4) Head-to-head away goals scored.
(C) Champions; (D) Disqualified; (P) Promoted; (R) Relegated

== East ==
=== Teams ===
Club	City / Town
Bregalnica Golak	Delchevo
Kit-Go	Pehchevo
Kezhovica	Novo Selo
Malesh	Berovo
Ovche Pole	Sveti Nikole
Rudar	Probishtip
Sloga 1934	Vinica
Zrnovka	Zrnovci

=== Table ===
Pos	Team	Pld	W	D	L	GF	GA	GD	Pts	Promotion or relegation
1	Kit-Go Pehchevo (C, P)	26	25	1	0	120	15	+105	76	Promotion to Macedonian Second League
2	Kezhovica	26	14	2	10	63	39	+24	44	
3	Sloga 1934 Vinica	26	9	5	12	39	64	−25	32	
4	Ovche Pole	25	8	6	11	40	51	−11	30	
5	Malesh (Note: Malesh were deducted 3 points.)	25	8	7	10	51	47	+4	28	
6	Bregalnica Golak (Note: Bregalnica Golak were deducted 3 points for not appearing at the Round 19 match.)	26	8	7	11	40	48	−8	28	
7	Rudar Probishtip (Note: Rudar Probishtip were deducted 3 points for not appearing at the Round 22 match.)	26	9	3	14	53	68	−15	27	
8	Zrnovka (Note: Zrnovka were expelled after round 16 for not showing two matches. The results of the spring half-season are expunged.) (D, R)	14	0	1	13	11	85	−74	1	Relegation to Macedonian Municipal Leagues

Source: MacedonianFootball.com
Rules for classification: 1) Points; 2) Head-to-head points; 3) Head-to-head goal difference; 4) Head-to-head away goals scored.
(C) Champions; (D) Disqualified; (P) Promoted; (R) Relegated

== West ==
=== Teams ===
Club	City / Town
Arsimi	Chegrane
Çakllani	Gorno Palchishte
Drita	Bogovinje
Flamurtari (D)	Debreshe
Genç Kalemler	Dolna Banjica
Kamjani	Kamenjane
Napredok (KI)	Kichevo
Nerashti	Nerashte
Reçica	Golema Rechica
Vardari	Forino
Vrapchishte	Vrapchishte
Uskana	Kichevo
Xixa	Greshnica

=== Table ===
Pos	Team	Pld	W	D	L	GF	GA	GD	Pts	Promotion or relegation
1	Genç Kalemler Sport (C, P)	23	20	2	1	82	12	+70	62	Promotion to Macedonian Second League
2	Vardari Forino	23	20	2	1	87	20	+67	62	
3	Arsimi	23	15	2	6	70	44	+26	47	
4	Nerashti	23	13	1	9	67	49	+18	40	
5	Napredok Kichevo	23	9	4	10	56	53	+3	31	
6	Reçica	23	9	3	11	46	49	−3	30	
7	Drita	23	8	4	11	43	50	−7	28	
8	Kamjani	23	8	3	12	48	62	−14	27	
9	Xixa	24	9	3	12	41	58	−17	30	
10	Flamurtari Debreshe	23	8	4	11	43	50	−7	28	
11	Çakllani (Note: Çakllani were relegated due to merger with Besa Dobri Dol.) (R)	23	5	3	15	37	90	−53	18 (Note: Head-to-head record: Vrapchishte–Çakllani 0–3, Çakllani–Vrapchishte 3–0.)	Relegation to Macedonian Municipal Leagues
12	Vrapchishte (R)	23	5	3	15	20	51	−31	18	Relegation to Macedonian Municipal Leagues
13	Uskana (Note: Uskana were withdraw before the start a spring half-season. The results from the autumn half-season were remain in effect.) (D, R)	12	0	1	11	14	50	−36	1	Relegation to Macedonian Municipal Leagues

Source: MacedonianFootball.com
Rules for classification: 1) Points; 2) Head-to-head points; 3) Head-to-head goal difference; 4) Head-to-head away goals scored.
(C) Champions; (D) Disqualified; (P) Promoted; (R) Relegated

== Southwest ==
=== Teams ===
Club	City / Town
Bair Krkardash	Bitola
Flamurtari (R)	Radolishta
Karaorman	Struga
Korabi	Debar
Kravari	Kravari
Lirija (G)	Grnchari
Mogila	Mogila
Ohrid	Ohrid
Oktisi Sport	Oktisi
Prespa	Resen
Sateska	Volino
Veleshta	Veleshta
Vlaznimi	Struga
Voska	Ohrid

=== Table ===
Pos	Team	Pld	W	D	L	GF	GA	GD	Pts	Promotion or relegation
1	Korabi (C, P)	24	19	1	4	79	23	+56	58	Promotion to Macedonian Second League
2	Prespa	24	13	1	10	59	43	+16	40	
3	Flamurtari Radolishta (Note: Flamurtari Radolishta were deducted 3 points for leaving the pitch in the 45th minute during the Round 13 game.)	24	13	3	8	45	35	+10	39	
4	Karaorman	24	11	5	8	61	52	+9	38	
5	Lirija Grnchari	24	11	3	10	55	47	+8	36	
6	Vlaznimi	24	10	6	8	53	48	+5	36	
7	Kravari	24	11	2	11	60	53	+7	35	
8	Sateska	24	10	2	12	62	58	+4	32	
9	Veleshta (Note: Veleshta were deducted 3 points for not appearing on a game in Round 3.)	24	11	2	11	56	59	−3	32	
10	Ohrid	24	9	2	13	59	70	−11	29	
11	Oktisi Sport	24	8	5	11	33	46	−13	29	
12	Voska (R)	24	8	2	14	48	74	−26	26	Relegation to Macedonian Municipal Leagues
13	Mogila (Note: Mogila were withdraw before the start a spring half-season. The results from the autumn half-season were remain in effect.) (D, R)	13	6	0	7	22	29	−7	18	Relegation to Macedonian Municipal Leagues
14	Bair Krkardash (Note: Bair Krkardash were withdraw before the start a spring half-season. The results from the autumn half-season were remain in effect.) (D, R)	13	0	0	13	14	69	−55	0	Relegation to Macedonian Municipal Leagues

Source: MacedonianFootball.com
Rules for classification: 1) Points; 2) Head-to-head points; 3) Head-to-head goal difference; 4) Head-to-head away goals scored.
(C) Champions; (D) Disqualified; (P) Promoted; (R) Relegated

== See also ==
- 2017–18 Macedonian Football Cup
- 2017–18 Macedonian First Football League
- 2017–18 Macedonian Second Football League
