= 2018–19 Macedonian Third Football League =

Macedonian Third League
- Season: 2018–19

The 2018–19 Macedonian Third Football League was the 27th season of the third-tier football league in North Macedonia, since its establishment.

== North ==
=== Teams ===
Club	City / Town
Besa-Vlazrimi	Slupchane
Bratstvo-Vlaznimi	Sredno Konjari
Euromilk	Gorno Lisiche, Skopje
Fortuna	Chento, Skopje
Ilinden Skopje	Ilinden
Kadino	Kadino
Lokomotiva	Karposh, Skopje
Marino	Marino
Petrovec	Petrovec
Rinia 98	Dolno Svilare
SSK	Drachevo, Skopje
Studena Voda	Dobroshane
Tekstilec	Kisela Voda, Skopje
Volkovo	Volkovo

=== Table ===
Pos	Team	Pld	W	D	L	GF	GA	GD	Pts	Promotion or relegation
1	Kadino (C, P)	26	22	1	3	93	25	+68	67	Promotion to Macedonian Second League
2	Fortuna	26	18	1	7	83	44	+39	55	Qualification to Promotion play-offs
3	SSK Nova	26	15	6	5	51	38	+13	51	
4	Studena Voda	26	14	2	10	73	43	+30	44	
5	Bratstvo-Vlaznimi	26	14	1	11	60	42	+18	43	
6	Ilinden Skopje	26	13	3	10	58	46	+12	42	
7	Besa-Vlazrimi (Note: Besa-Vlazrimi were deducted three points for incident in the Round 22 match.)	26	13	2	11	56	44	+12	38	
8	Lokomotiva	26	11	4	11	54	50	+4	37	
9	Rinia 98	26	10	4	12	54	51	+3	34	
10	Petrovec	26	10	3	13	51	63	−12	33	
11	Volkovo	26	9	4	13	41	67	−26	31	
12	Euromilk Gorno Lisiche (Note: Euromilk Gorno Lisiche were deducted three points for not appearing at the Round 20 match.) (R)	26	9	0	17	38	66	−28	24	Relegation to Macedonian Municipal Leagues
13	Tekstilec (R)	26	4	2	20	36	97	−61	14	Relegation to Macedonian Municipal Leagues
14	Marino (R)	26	3	1	22	27	99	−72	10	Relegation to Macedonian Municipal Leagues

Source: MacedonianFootball.com
Rules for classification: 1) Points; 2) Head-to-head points; 3) Head-to-head goal difference; 4) Head-to-head away goals scored.
(C) Champions; (P) Promoted; (R) Relegated

== Center ==
=== Teams ===
Club	City / Town
Babuna	Martolci
Bratstvo 07	Zhitoshe
Golemo Konjari	Golemo Konjari
Marena	Marena
Mladost (K)	Krivogashtani
Napredok (KR)	Krusheani
Novo Crnilishte	Crnilishte
Pitu Guli	Krushevo
Prevalec	Veles
Rosoman 83	Rosoman
Topolchani	Topolchani
Topolka	Veles

=== Table ===
Pos	Team	Pld	W	D	L	GF	GA	GD	Pts	Promotion or relegation
1	Pitu Guli (C, P)	22	18	1	3	56	15	+41	55	Promotion to Macedonian Second League
2	Prevalec	22	17	3	2	60	19	+41	54	
3	Babuna (R)	22	10	3	9	59	40	+19	33	Relegation to Macedonian Municipal Leagues
4	Bratstvo 07 Zhitoshe (Note: Bratstvo 07 were deducted one point due to the wrong documentation of their football player.)	22	9	5	8	60	44	+16	31	
5	Novo Crnilishte	22	9	3	10	52	42	+10	30	
6	Napredok Krusheani	22	8	6	8	45	59	−14	30	
7	Mladost 1930 Krivogashtani	22	8	4	10	40	50	−10	28	
8	Rosoman 83 (Note: Rosoman 83 were deducted three points for not appearing at the Round 12 match.)	22	8	6	8	37	32	+5	27	
9	Golemo Konjari	22	7	6	9	29	45	−16	27	
10	Marena	22	8	2	12	46	56	−10	26	
11	Topolchani (R)	22	6	1	15	26	57	−31	19	Relegation to Macedonian Municipal Leagues
12	Topolka (Note: Topolka were deducted three points for interrupting the Round 17 match and attacking the referee.) (R)	22	3	2	17	28	79	−51	8	Relegation to Macedonian Municipal Leagues

Source: MacedonianFootball.com
Rules for classification: 1) Points; 2) Head-to-head points; 3) Head-to-head goal difference; 4) Head-to-head away goals scored.
(C) Champions; (P) Promoted; (R) Relegated

== Southeast ==
=== Teams ===
Club	City / Town
Dojransko Ezero	Nov Dojran
Mladost (U)	Udovo
Spartmani	Gradsko Baldovci
Tiverija	Strumica
Horizont Turnovo	Turnovo
Vasilevo	Vasilevo

=== Table ===
Pos	Team	Pld	W	D	L	GF	GA	GD	Pts	Promotion or relegation
1	Dojransko Ezero (Note: Dojransko Ezero were rejected promotion to the Second League-East for next season. The next team with a possible promotion right, Tiverija, were also rejected promotion to the Second League.) (C)	18	13	3	2	41	17	+24	42	Promotion to Macedonian Second League
2	Tiverija	18	9	3	6	55	28	+27	30	
3	Mladost Udovo	18	8	1	9	41	44	−3	25	
4	Vasilevo	18	6	2	10	34	56	−22	20	
5	Spartmani	18	4	3	11	25	44	−19	15	
6	Horizont Turnovo (Note: Horizont Turnovo were expelled after round 14 for not playing two consecutive matches. Only the results of the first half-season were valid.) (D, R)	10	4	0	6	20	27	−7	12	Relegation to Macedonian Municipal Leagues

Source: MacedonianFootball.com
Rules for classification: 1) Points; 2) Head-to-head points; 3) Head-to-head goal difference; 4) Head-to-head away goals scored.
(C) Champions; (D) Disqualified; (R) Relegated

== East ==
=== Teams ===
Club	City / Town
Bregalnica Golak	Delchevo
Kezhovica	Novo Selo
Malesh	Berovo
Rabotnik	Lozovo
Osogovo	Kochani
Ovche Pole	Sveti Nikole
Rudar	Probishtip
Sloga 1934	Vinica

=== Table ===
Pos	Team	Pld	W	D	L	GF	GA	GD	Pts	Promotion or relegation
1	Osogovo (C, P)	25	17	4	4	58	25	+33	55	Promotion to Macedonian Second League
2	Ovche Pole	25	14	5	6	55	25	+30	47	
3	Rudar Probishtip (R)	25	11	1	13	54	67	−13	34	Relegation to Macedonian Municipal Leagues
4	Bregalnica Golak	25	8	8	9	35	41	−6	32	
5	Malesh	25	6	4	15	35	67	−32	22	
6	Sloga 1934 Vinica (Note: Sloga 1934 Vinica were deducted three points for not appearing at the Round 9 match.)	25	7	2	16	33	48	−15	20	
7	Kezhovica (Note: Kezhovica were expelled after round 17 for not playing two consecutive matches. Only the results of the first half-season were valid. Also, Kezhovica were deducted nine points for quitting the league.) (D, R)	14	8	3	3	26	10	+16	18	Relegation to Macedonian Municipal Leagues
8	Rabotnik Lozovo (Note: Rabotnik Djumajlija were deducted nine points for quitting the league.) (D, R)	20	7	1	12	24	37	−13	13	Relegation to Macedonian Municipal Leagues

Source: MacedonianFootball.com
Rules for classification: 1) Points; 2) Head-to-head points; 3) Head-to-head goal difference; 4) Head-to-head away goals scored.
(C) Champions; (D) Disqualified; (P) Promoted; (R) Relegated

== West ==
=== Teams ===
Club	City / Town
Arsimi	Chegrane
Besa	Dobri Dol
Drita	Bogovinje
Flamurtari (D)	Debreshe
Kamjani	Kamenjane
Ljuboten	Tetovo
Napredok (KI)	Kichevo
Nerashti	Nerashte
Reçica	Golema Rechica
Trabzonspor	Gorna Banjica
Vardari	Forino
Xixa	Greshnica
Zajazi	Zajas

=== Table ===
Pos	Team	Pld	W	D	L	GF	GA	GD	Pts	Promotion or relegation
1	Drita (C, P)	24	18	6	0	65	16	+49	60	Promotion to Macedonian Second League
2	Vardari Forino (P)	24	17	5	2	65	22	+43	56	Qualification to Promotion play-offs
3	Besa Dobri Dol	24	14	5	5	58	24	+34	47	
4	Napredok Kichevo	24	14	2	8	50	33	+17	44	
5	Trabzonspor	24	10	4	10	39	38	+1	34	
6	Ljuboten	24	9	4	11	42	49	−7	31	
7	Zajazi	24	8	6	10	37	40	−3	30	
8	Nerashti	24	9	3	12	31	36	−5	30	
9	Reçica	24	9	3	12	26	40	−14	30	
10	Arsimi	24	7	8	9	29	33	−4	29	
11	Kamjani	24	8	3	13	42	45	−3	27	
12	Xixa (R)	24	5	3	16	37	64	−27	18	Relegation to Macedonian Municipal Leagues
13	Flamurtari Debreshe	24	1	1	22	17	98	−81	4	Relegation to Macedonian Municipal Leagues

Source: MacedonianFootball.com
Rules for classification: 1) Points; 2) Head-to-head points; 3) Head-to-head goal difference; 4) Head-to-head away goals scored.
(C) Champions; (P) Promoted; (R) Relegated

== Southwest ==
=== Teams ===
Club	City / Town
Crno Buki ZL	Crnobuki
Flamurtari (R)	Radolishta
Karaorman	Struga
Kravari	Kravari
Lakocherej	Lakocherej
Liria (Z)	Zagrachani
Lirija (G)	Grnchari
Novaci	Novaci
Ohrid	Ohrid
Oktisi Sport	Oktisi
Prespa	Resen
Sateska	Volino
Veleshta	Veleshta
Vlaznimi	Struga

=== Table ===
Pos	Team	Pld	W	D	L	GF	GA	GD	Pts	Promotion or relegation
1	Ohrid (C, P)	25	18	4	3	78	23	+55	58	Promotion to Macedonian Second League
2	Vlaznimi	25	13	4	8	38	28	+10	43	Qualification to Promotion play-offs
3	Crno Buki ZL	25	12	3	10	41	31	+10	39	
4	Lirija Grnchari	25	12	3	10	48	43	+5	39	
5	Novaci	25	12	1	12	50	40	+10	37	
6	Karaorman	25	11	3	11	56	46	+10	36	
7	Veleshta	25	11	2	12	49	57	−8	35	
8	Sateska	25	11	2	12	42	53	−11	35	
9	Kravari	25	10	4	11	49	56	−7	34	
10	Flamurtari Radolishta	25	10	3	12	34	43	−9	33	
11	Lakocherej (R)	25	10	2	13	38	63	−25	32	Relegation to Macedonian Municipal Leagues
12	Prespa (Note: Prespa were spared from the relegation because were no clubs from the Second League which were relegated to the Southern group.)	25	8	7	10	40	41	−1	31	Relegation to Macedonian Municipal Leagues
13	Liria Zagrachani (Note: Liria Zagrachani were expelled after round 20 for not playing two consecutive matches. Only the results of the first half-season were valid.) (D, R)	13	6	0	7	25	30	−5	18	Relegation to Macedonian Municipal Leagues
14	Oktisi Sport (Note: Oktisi Sport were spared from the relegation because were filled the place of Lakocherej which were withdraw from the competition for the next season.)	25	6	0	19	38	72	−34	18	Relegation to Macedonian Municipal Leagues

Source: MacedonianFootball.com
Rules for classification: 1) Points; 2) Head-to-head points; 3) Head-to-head goal difference; 4) Head-to-head away goals scored.
(C) Champions; (D) Disqualified; (P) Promoted; (R) Relegated

== Promotion play-offs ==
=== For Second League - West ===
Pos	Team	Pld	W	D	L	GF	GA	GD	Pts	Promotion
1	Vardari (P)	2	2	0	0	7	2	+5	6	Promotion to Macedonian Second League
2	Vlaznimi	2	1	0	1	4	3	+1	3	
3	Fortuna	2	0	0	2	2	8	−6	0	

(P) Promoted
12 June 2019

Vardari	2–1	Vlaznimi
Emruli 19'; Aliji 45+1'	Report	Limani 90+4'

Gradski stadion, Tetovo
Referee: Marjan Mladenovski (Skopje)
15 June 2019

Vlaznimi	3–1	Fortuna
Osmani 19'; Shekutkoski 52', 90'	Report	Fazliji 57'

Gradski stadion, Tetovo
Referee: Stojanche Trpchevski (Kavadarci)
19 June 2019

Fortuna	1–5	Vardari
Mamuti 4'	Report	Miftar 27', 47', 76'; Emruli 73'; Brahimi 82'

Gradski stadion, Tetovo
Referee: Marjan Gocevski (Strumica)

== See also ==
- 2018–19 Macedonian Football Cup
- 2018–19 Macedonian First Football League
- 2018–19 Macedonian Second Football League
