= 2016–17 Macedonian Third Football League =

Macedonian Third League
- Season: 2016–17

The 2016–17 Macedonian Third Football League was the 25th season of the third-tier football league in the Republic of Macedonia, since its establishment.

== North ==
=== Teams ===
Club	City / Town
Besa-Vlazrimi	Slupchane
Fortuna	Skopje
Goblen	Kumanovo
Goce Delchev	Skopsko Pole
Ilinden Skopje	Ilinden
Kadino	Kadino
Lokomotiva	Skopje
Madjari Solidarost	Skopje
Petrovec	Petrovec
Slavija	Pržino
SSK Nova	Skopje
Volkovo	Volkovo

=== Table ===
Pos	Team	Pld	W	D	L	GF	GA	GD	Pts	Promotion or relegation
1	Lokomotiva (C, P)	22	17	2	3	77	20	+57	53	Promotion to Macedonian Second League
2	Goblen	22	17	2	3	88	24	+64	53	Qualification to Promotion play-offs
3	SSK Nova	22	12	3	7	55	29	+26	39	
4	Madjari Solidarost	22	11	5	6	43	29	+14	38	
5	Volkovo	22	9	4	9	38	39	−1	31	
6	Ilinden Skopje	22	9	3	10	48	53	−5	30	
7	Kadino	22	8	3	11	36	43	−7	27	
8	Besa-Vlazrimi	22	9	0	13	57	71	−14	27	
9	Fortuna	22	9	0	13	42	46	−4	27	
10	Petrovec	22	8	2	12	34	45	−11	26	
11	Goce Delchev (Note: Goce Delchev were deducted 3 points.) (R)	22	8	0	14	33	80	−47	21	Relegation to Macedonian Municipal Leagues
12	Slavija (R)	22	3	0	19	27	99	−72	9	Relegation to Macedonian Municipal Leagues

Source: MacedonianFootball.com
Rules for classification: 1) Points; 2) Head-to-head points; 3) Head-to-head goal difference; 4) Head-to-head away goals scored.
(C) Champions; (P) Promoted; (R) Relegated

== South ==
=== Teams ===
Club	City / Town
11 Oktomvri	Prilep
Borec	Veles
Dojransko Ezero	Dojran
Gemidjii	Veles
Golemo Konjari	Golemo Konjari
Kozhuf	Gevgelija
Mladost	Udovo
Napredok	Krusheani
Partizan	Obrshani
Pitu Guli	Krushevo
Pobeda	Valandovo
Prevalec	Veles
Rosoman 83	Rosoman
Zorbas Pobeda	Mrzenci

=== Table ===
Pos	Team	Pld	W	D	L	GF	GA	GD	Pts	Promotion or relegation
1	Kozhuf (C, P)	25	22	2	1	85	9	+76	68	Promotion to Macedonian Second League
2	Borec (P)	25	20	3	2	93	18	+75	63	Promotion to Macedonian Second League
3	Pobeda Valandovo (P)	25	15	5	5	64	36	+28	50	Promotion to Macedonian Second League
4	Prevalec	25	15	2	8	51	22	+29	47	Qualification to Promotion play-offs
5	Napredok Krusheani	25	13	4	8	49	46	+3	43	
6	Mladost Udovo	21	10	0	11	50	70	−20	30	
7	Partizan Obrshani	25	10	2	13	49	53	−4	32	
8	Pitu Guli	25	7	7	11	26	39	−13	28	
9	Gemidjii (R)	25	8	4	13	43	64	−21	28	Withdraw from the league
10	Dojransko Ezero	25	8	3	14	34	65	−31	27	
11	Golemo Konjari	25	8	2	15	44	67	−23	26	
12	Zorbas Pobeda (R)	25	7	2	16	31	58	−27	23	Withdraw from the league
13	Rosoman 83	25	4	4	17	21	60	−39	16	
14	11 Oktomvri (Note: 11 Oktomvri were deducted 3 points.) (R)	13	0	0	13	5	38	−33	−6	Withdraw from the league

Source: MacedonianFootball.com
Rules for classification: 1) Points; 2) Head-to-head points; 3) Head-to-head goal difference; 4) Head-to-head away goals scored.
(C) Champions; (P) Promoted; (R) Relegated

== East ==
=== Teams ===
Club	City / Town
Belasica	Strumica
Bregalnica Golak	Delchevo
Kit-Go	Pehchevo
Birlik	Konche
Malesh	Berovo
Napredok	Radovo
Osogovo	Kočani
Ovche Pole	Sveti Nikole
Plachkovica	Radovish
Rabotnik	Lozovo
Rudar	Probištip
Sasa	Makedonska Kamenica
Sloga 1934	Vinica
Tiverija	Strumica
Vasilevo	Vasilevo

=== Table ===
Pos	Team	Pld	W	D	L	GF	GA	GD	Pts	Promotion or relegation
1	Belasica (C, P)	27	24	1	2	126	14	+112	73	Promotion to Macedonian Second League
2	Plachkovica (P)	27	22	0	5	78	14	+64	66	Promotion to Macedonian Second League
3	Osogovo (P)	27	20	0	7	63	25	+38	60	Promotion to Macedonian Second League
4	Sasa (P)	27	18	1	8	68	29	+39	55	Qualification to Promotion play-offs
5	Kit-Go Pehchevo	27	16	3	8	0	27	−27	51	
6	Ovche Pole	27	13	8	6	62	38	+24	47	
7	Napredok Radovo	27	11	2	14	46	63	−17	35	
8	Vasilevo (Note: Vasilevo were deducted 3 points.)	27	10	4	13	40	60	−20	31	
9	Bregalnica Golak	27	9	3	15	43	59	−16	30	
10	Malesh	27	8	2	17	43	55	−12	26	
11	Tiverija	27	7	3	17	27	63	−36	24	
12	Sloga 1934 Vinica	27	7	3	17	32	77	−45	24	
13	Rudar Probishtip	27	7	2	18	33	78	−45	23	
14	Rabotnik Djumajlija (R)	27	6	4	17	18	47	−29	22	Relegation to Macedonian Municipal Leagues
15	Birlik Konche (R)	14	0	0	14	5	94	−89	0	Withdraw from the league

Source: MacedonianFootball.com
Rules for classification: 1) Points; 2) Head-to-head points; 3) Head-to-head goal difference; 4) Head-to-head away goals scored.
(C) Champions; (P) Promoted; (R) Relegated

== West ==
=== Teams ===
Club	City / Town
Arsimi	Chegrane
Besa	Chelopek
Drita	Bogovinje
Flamurtari	Debreshe
Gostivar	Gostivar
Kamjani	Kamenjane
Napredok	Kičevo
Reçica	Golema Rechica
Skënderbeu	Poroj
Tearca-97	Tearce
Vardari	Forino
Vrapchishte	Vrapchishte
Xixa	Greshnica
Zajazi	Zajas

=== Table ===
Pos	Team	Pld	W	D	L	GF	GA	GD	Pts	Promotion or relegation
1	Gostivar (C, P)	25	23	2	0	102	15	+87	71	Promotion to Macedonian Second League
2	Zajazi (P)	25	20	1	4	91	29	+62	61	Qualification to Promotion play-offs
3	Vardari Forino	25	16	5	4	65	27	+38	53	
4	Drita	25	14	3	8	59	43	+16	45	
5	Skënderbeu Poroj (R)	25	12	1	12	55	71	−16	37	Withdraw from the league
6	Reçica	35	10	6	19	38	32	+6	36	
7	Vrapchishte	25	9	3	13	52	58	−6	30	
8	Xixa	25	9	3	13	53	63	−10	30	
9	Arsimi	25	9	1	15	38	71	−33	28	
10	Flamurtari Debreshe	25	8	2	15	54	73	−19	26	
11	Napredok Kichevo	25	7	4	14	40	56	−16	25	
12	Kamjani	25	5	4	16	41	65	−24	19	
13	Besa Chelopek (R)	25	5	1	19	39	94	−55	16	Withdraw from the league
14	Tearca-97 (R)	13	3	2	8	7	37	−30	11	Withdraw from the league

Source: MacedonianFootball.com
Rules for classification: 1) Points; 2) Head-to-head points; 3) Head-to-head goal difference; 4) Head-to-head away goals scored.
(C) Champions; (P) Promoted; (R) Relegated

== Southwest ==
=== Teams ===
Club	City / Town
Flamurtari	Radolishta
Karaorman	Struga
Korabi	Debar
Kravari	Kravari
Labunishta	Labunishta
Lirija	Grnchari
Mogila	Mogila
Ohrid	Ohrid
Proleter	Makedonski Brod
Prespa	Resen
Sateska	Debarca
Struga	Struga
Veleshta	Veleshta
Vlaznimi	Struga

=== Table ===
Pos	Team	Pld	W	D	L	GF	GA	GD	Pts	Promotion or relegation
1	Struga (C, P)	26	17	8	1	68	16	+52	59	Promotion to Macedonian Second League
2	Labunishta (P)	26	17	5	4	61	24	+37	56	Qualification to Promotion play-offs
3	Korabi (Note: Korabi were deducted 3 points.)	26	16	7	3	61	34	+27	52	
4	Kravari	26	12	7	7	60	37	+23	43	
5	Ohrid	26	11	4	11	62	56	+6	37	
6	Prespa	26	11	2	13	49	59	−10	35	
7	Lirija Grnchari	26	10	4	12	51	61	−10	34	
8	Sateska (Note: Sateska were deducted 3 points.)	26	11	1	14	57	70	−13	31	
9	Mogila	26	9	3	14	39	48	−9	30	
10	Vlaznimi	26	8	5	13	47	48	−1	29	
11	Veleshta	26	9	2	15	49	77	−28	29	
12	Flamurtari Radolishta	26	9	1	16	45	54	−9	28	
13	Karaorman	26	7	6	13	46	64	−18	27	
14	Proleter (MB) (R)	23	6	0	17	42	89	−47	18	Relegation to Macedonian Municipal Leagues

Source: MacedonianFootball.com
Rules for classification: 1) Points; 2) Head-to-head points; 3) Head-to-head goal difference; 4) Head-to-head away goals scored.
(C) Champions; (P) Promoted; (R) Relegated

== Promotion play-offs ==
=== For Second League - East ===
4 June 2017
17:00 CEST

Prevalec	1–4	Sasa
Todorovski 45'	Report	Zlatkovski 42', 65', 85'; Atanasovski 90'

Stadion Nikola Mantov, Kochani

=== For Second League - West ===
Pos	Team	Pld	W	D	L	GF	GA	GD	Pts	Promotion
1	Labunishta (P)	2	1	1	0	6	2	+4	4	Promotion to Macedonian Second League
2	Zajazi (P)	2	1	1	0	3	1	+2	4	Promotion to Macedonian Second League
3	Goblen	2	0	0	2	1	7	−6	0	

(P) Promoted
4 June 2017
17:00 CEST

Goblen	0–2	Zajazi
	Report	Mustafoski 12'; Dushku 89'

Gradski stadion, Gostivar
7 June 2017
17:00 CEST

Zajazi	1–1	Labunishta
Xheladini 75'	Report	Shoposki 14'

Gradski stadion, Gostivar
10 June 2017
17:00 CEST

Goblen	1–5	Labunishta
Memeti 47'	Report	Dalcheski 38'; Klechkaroski 63' (pen.); Simjanoski 72'; Limani 73', 89'

Gradski stadion, Gostivar

== See also ==
- 2016–17 Macedonian Football Cup
- 2016–17 Macedonian First Football League
- 2016–17 Macedonian Second Football League
