= Musa Ibraimi =

Macedonian politician (born 1978)

Musa Ibraimi (born 17 June 1978) is a Macedonian politician.

== Biography ==
Musa Ibraimi was born on 17 June 1978 in the Albanian village of Žitoše, Prilep, then in the Socialist Federal Republic of Yugoslavia, now in North Macedonia. He graduated from the International University of Struga. According to his autobiography, he also graduated in law from the University of Tetovo. From 2009 to 2014, he worked as a journalist at the Macedonian Radio and Television in Skopje. On 30 June 2014, he replaced former deputy prime minister Musa Xhaferi as a member of the Assembly of the Republic of Macedonia for the Democratic Union for Integration.
