= KF Nerashti =

Macedonian football club

- Full name: Klubi Futbollistik Nerashti
- Chairman: Mumin Ismaili
- League: Macedonian Third League (West)
Home colours

KF Nerashti is a football club based in the village of Nerašte, Jegunovce Municipality, North Macedonia. They are currently competing in the Macedonian Third League (West Division).
