= Konče =

Konče Конче
- Village
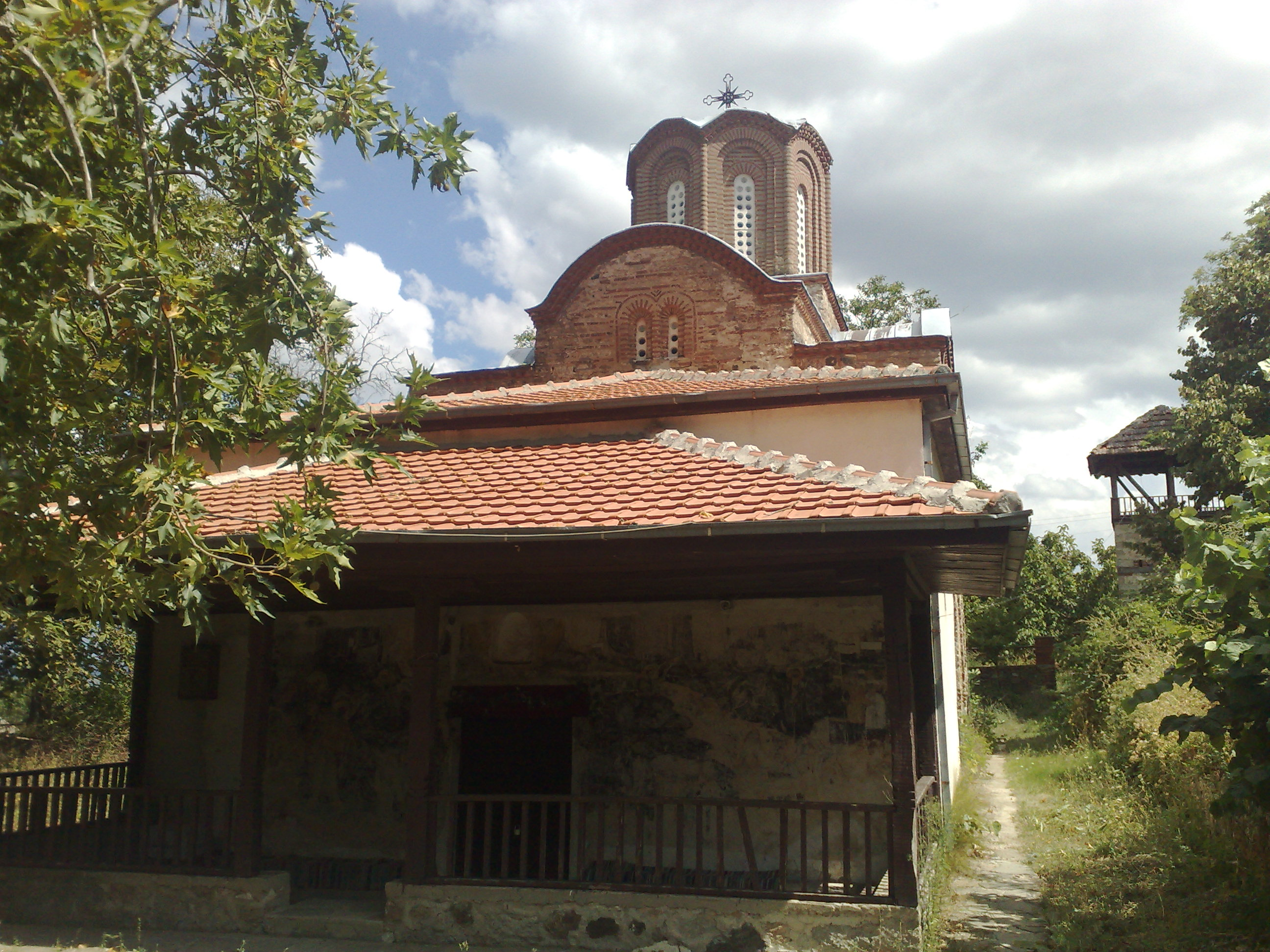
- Church of Saint Stefan in Konče, built in 1366

- Location within North Macedonia
- Country: North Macedonia
- Region: Southeastern
- Municipality: Konče

Population (2021)
  - Total: 915
- Time zone: UTC+1 (CET)
  - Summer (DST): UTC+2 (CEST)
- Vehicle registration: RA
- Website: .

Konče (Macedonian: Конче; Turkish Konçe) is a village in North Macedonia. It is the seat of Konče Municipality.

== Demographics ==
According to the 2002 census, the village had a total of 967 inhabitants. Ethnic groups in the village include:

- Macedonians 444
- Turks 521
- Others 2

As of 2021, the village of Konche has 915 inhabitants and the ethnic composition was the following:

- Turks - 606
- Macedonians – 293
- Albanians – 1
- Bosniaks – 1
- others – 1
- Person without Data - 13

== Sports ==
The local football team is FK Birlik.

== Notable people ==
- Kantakuzina Katarina Branković (1419-1492), Serbian princess
