= KF Çair =

Football club

- Full name: Klubi Futbollistik Çair
- Founded: 2015; 10 years ago
- Ground: Çair Stadium
- Capacity: 2,800
- League: OFL Skopje
- 2018–19: OFL Skopje, 5th
- Website: kfcair.com.mk

KF Çair is a football club based in Çair Municipality, Skopje, North Macedonia. They are currently competing in the OFS Skopje league. Their home ground is Çair Stadium which has a seating capacity of 2,800.
