= Bašibos =

Bašibos Башибос
- Village
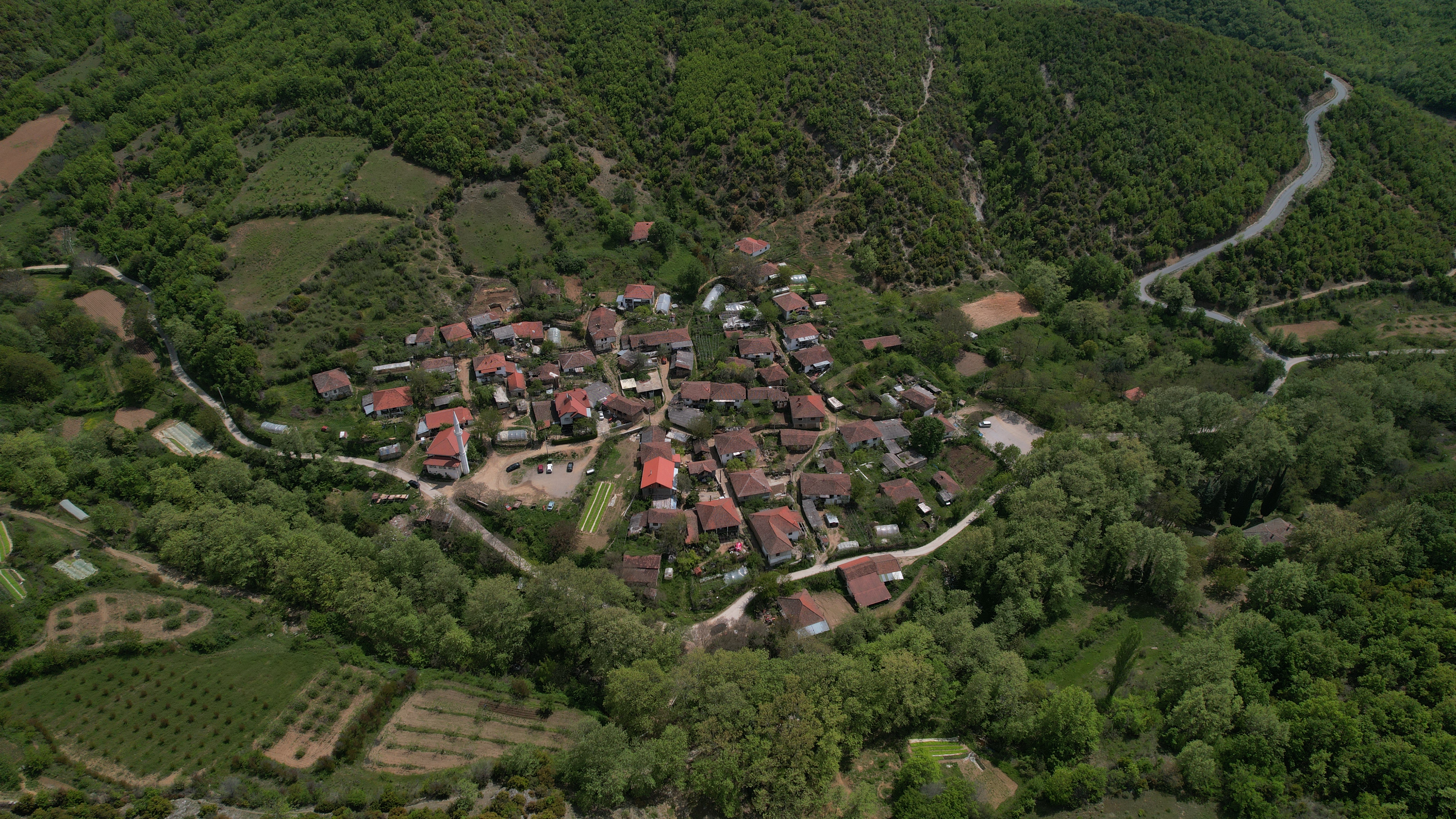
- Airview of the village

- Location within North Macedonia
- Coordinates: 41.308319°N 22.691663°E
- Country: North Macedonia
- Region: Southeastern
- Municipality: Valandovo

Population (2021)
  - Total: 110
- Time zone: UTC+1 (CET)
  - Summer (DST): UTC+2 (CEST)
- Website: .

Bašibos (Macedonian: Башибос) is a village in the municipality of Valandovo, North Macedonia. It is located close to the Greek border.

== Demographics ==
As of the 2021 census, Bašibos had 110 residents with the following ethnic composition:

- Turks 103
- Persons for whom data are taken from administrative sources 7

According to the 2002 census, the village had a total of 170 inhabitants. Ethnic groups in the village include:

- Turks 169
- Others 1
