= Marino, Ilinden =

Marino Марино
- Settlement
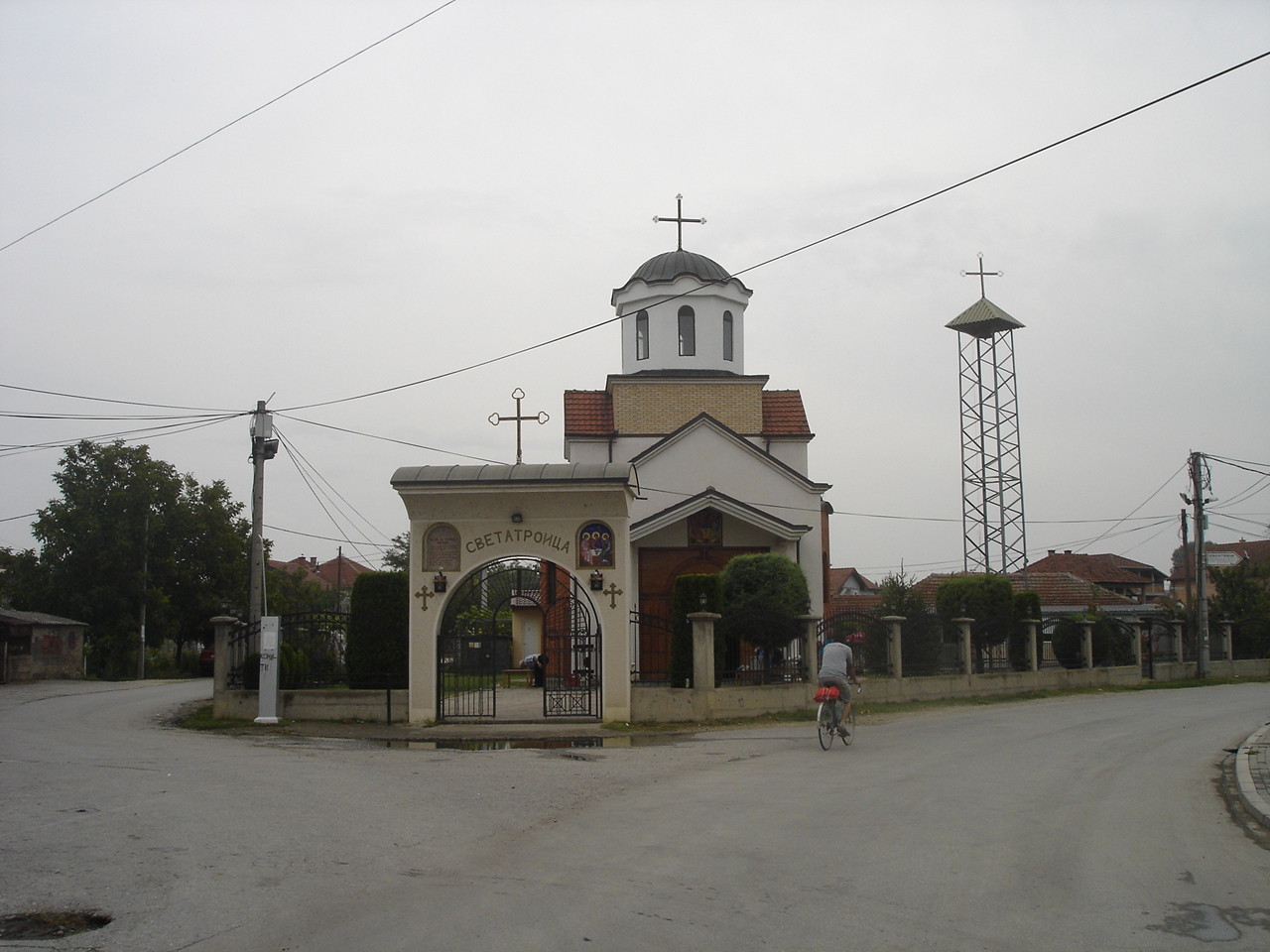

- Location within North Macedonia
- Country: North Macedonia
- Region: Skopje
- Municipality: Ilinden

Population (2021)
  - Total: 4,538
- Time zone: UTC+1 (CET)
  - Summer (DST): UTC+2 (CEST)
- Car plates: SK

Marino (Macedonian: Марино) is a settlement in the Ilinden Municipality of North Macedonia.The population in Marino is 3,533 – 22.23% of total 15,894 in the municipality (2002), which is the maximum from all settlements that belong to Ilinden Municipality.

It is located 1.51 km (0.94 mile) away from the center of the municipality. It is the nearest and most urban settlement from Ilinden Municipality.

== Demographics ==
As per the 2021 census, Marino had 4,538 residents with the following ethnic composition:

- Macedonians 4,146
- Persons for whom data are taken from administrative sources 285
- Serbs 83
- Others 24

According to the 2002 census, the settlement had a total of 3,533 inhabitants. Ethnic groups in the settlement include:

- Macedonians 3,396
- Serbs 129
- Others 8
