= FK Gemidžii =

- Full name: Fudbalski klub Gemidžii Veles
- Founded: 2006; 19 years ago

FK Gemidžii (Macedonian: ФК Гемиџии) is a football club based in the city of Veles, North Macedonia. They recently played in the Macedonian Third League.

== History ==
The club was founded in 2008, and was named after the anarchistic group who committed the bombings in Thessaloniki in 1903.
