= FK Birlik =

Birlik Konçe
- Full name: Futbol Kulübü Birlik Konçe
- Founded: 1993; 33 years ago
- League: OFL Radovish

FK Birlik Konçe (Macedonian: ФК Бирлик Конче, FK Birlik Konche) is a football club based in the village of Konche near Radovish, North Macedonia. They currently play in the OFS Radovish league.

== History ==
The club was founded in 1993.
