= Gorno Palčište =

Gorno Palčište Горно Палчиште Pallçisht i Epërm
- Village
- Location within Republic of Macedonia
- Coordinates: 41°59′N 20°55′E
- Country: North Macedonia
- Region: Polog
- Municipality: Bogovinje

Population (2021)
  - Total: 1,127
- Time zone: UTC+1 (CET)
  - Summer (DST): UTC+2 (CEST)
- Car plates: TE
- Website: .

Gorno Palčište (Macedonian: Горно Палчиште, Albanian: Pallçisht i Epërm) is a village in the municipality of Bogovinje, North Macedonia.

== History ==
Gorno Palčište is attested in the 1467/68 Ottoman tax registry (defter) for the Nahiyah of Kalkandelen. The village had a total of 57 Christian households, 2 bachelors and 2 widows.

According to the 1467-68 Ottoman defter, Gorno Palčište exhibits mixed Orthodox Christian Slavic and Albanian anthroponyms, with a predominance of names belonging to the Slavic sphere, alongside a small amount of Aromanian names present. Some families had a mixed Slav-Albanian anthroponomy.

== Demographics ==
As of the 2021 census, Gorno Palčište had 1,127 residents with the following ethnic composition:

- Albanians 1,037
- Persons for whom data are taken from administrative sources 90

According to the 2002 census, the village had a total of 1356 inhabitants. Ethnic groups in the village include:

- Albanians 1339
- Macedonians 1
- Others 16

According to the 1942 Albanian census, Gorno Palčište was inhabited by 1031 Muslim Albanians, 94 Bulgarians and 183 Serbs.

According to the Bulgarian scientific expedition during the First World War, Gorno Palčište was inhabited by 325 Pomaks.

According to the Bulgarian ethnographer Vasil Kanchov in 1900, the village of Gorno Palčište was inhabited by 165 Muslim Albanians.
