= Gradsko Baldovci =

Gradsko Baldovci Градско Балдовци
- Village
- Location within North Macedonia
- Coordinates: 41.423344°N 22.663024°E
- Country: North Macedonia
- Region: Southeastern
- Municipality: Strumica

Population (2002)
  - Total: 755
- Time zone: UTC+1 (CET)
  - Summer (DST): UTC+2 (CEST)
- Website: .

Gradsko Baldovci (Macedonian: Градско Балдовци) is a village in the municipality of Strumica, North Macedonia.

== Demographics ==
According to the 2002 census, the village had a total of 755 inhabitants. Ethnic groups in the village include:

- Macedonians 755
