= FK Bratstvo 07 Zhitoshe =

Bratstvo 07 Zhitoshe
- Full name: Fudbalski klub Bratstvo 07 Zhitoshe
- Founded: 2007; 18 years ago
- Dissolved: 2022; 3 years ago
- Ground: Smajo Kolasinac
- Chairman: Ferdi Sulejmani
- Manager: Rizman Coli Jusufi
- Coach: Romer Muric
- 2021–22: Second League (East), 9th (relegated)
Home colours	Away colours

FK Bratstvo 07 (Macedonian: ФК Братство 07; Albanian: KF Bratsvo 07) is a football club based in the village of Zhitoshe near Prilep, North Macedonia. They were recently competed in the Macedonian Second League (Eastern Division).

== History ==
The club was founded in 2007.
