= Dobrošane =

Dobrošane Доброшане
- Village
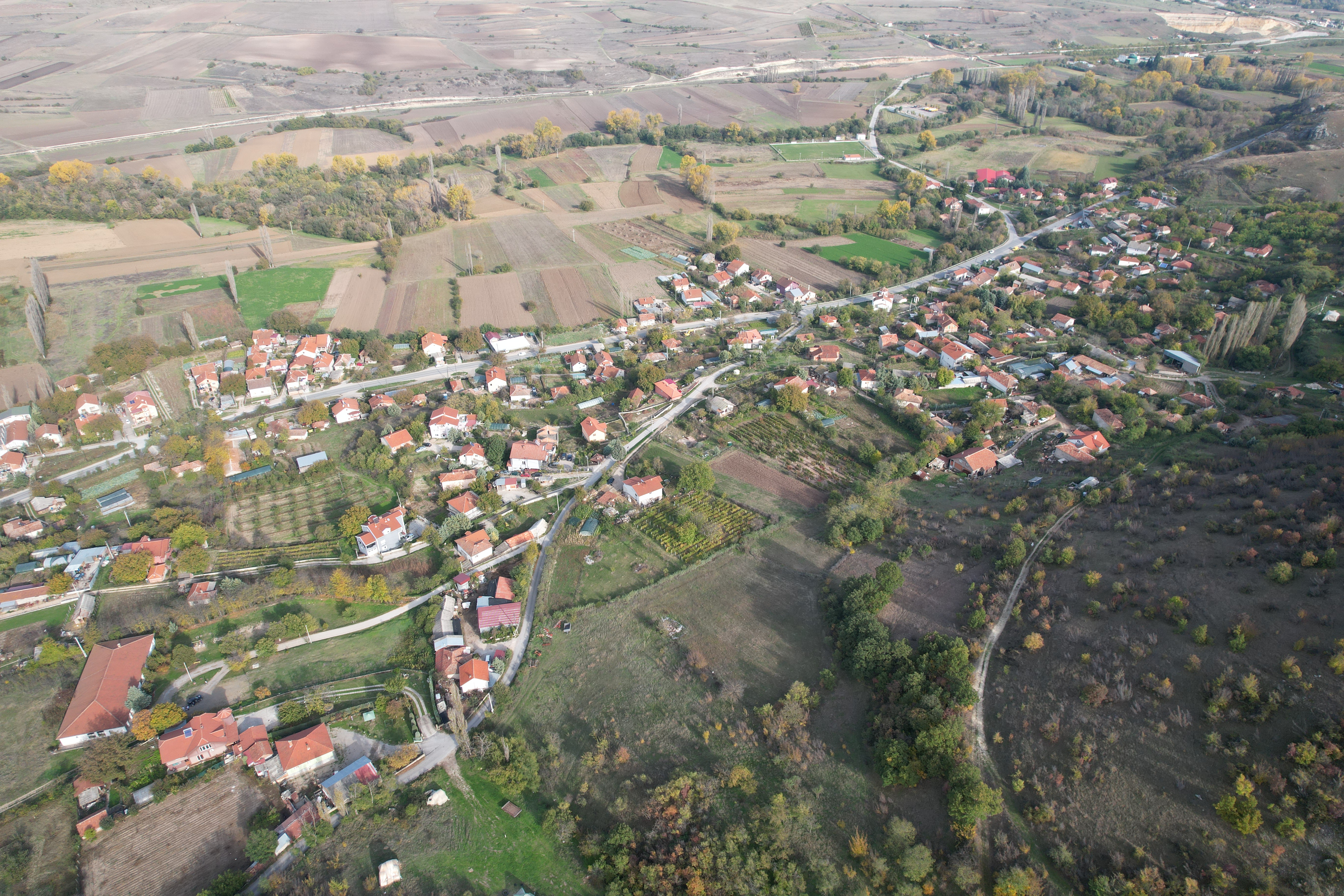
- Airview of the village

- Location within North Macedonia
- Coordinates: 42.105624°N 21.753198°E
- Country: North Macedonia
- Region: Northeastern
- Municipality: Kumanovo

Population (2021)
  - Total: 1,889
- Time zone: UTC+1 (CET)
  - Summer (DST): UTC+2 (CEST)
- Car plates: KU
- Website: .

Dobrošane (Macedonian: Доброшане) is a village in the municipality of Kumanovo, North Macedonia.

== Demographics ==
As of the 2021 census, Dobrošane had 1,889 residents with the following ethnic composition:

- Macedonians 1,666
- Persons for whom data are taken from administrative sources 112
- Serbs 47
- Vlachs 26
- Roma 23
- Others 15

According to the 2002 census, the village had a total of 1,655 inhabitants. Ethnic groups in the village include:

- Macedonians 1,571
- Serbs 17
- Romani 24
- Bosniaks 1
- Aromanians 39
- Others 3
