= Žitoše =

Žitoše Житоше Zhitosh
- Village
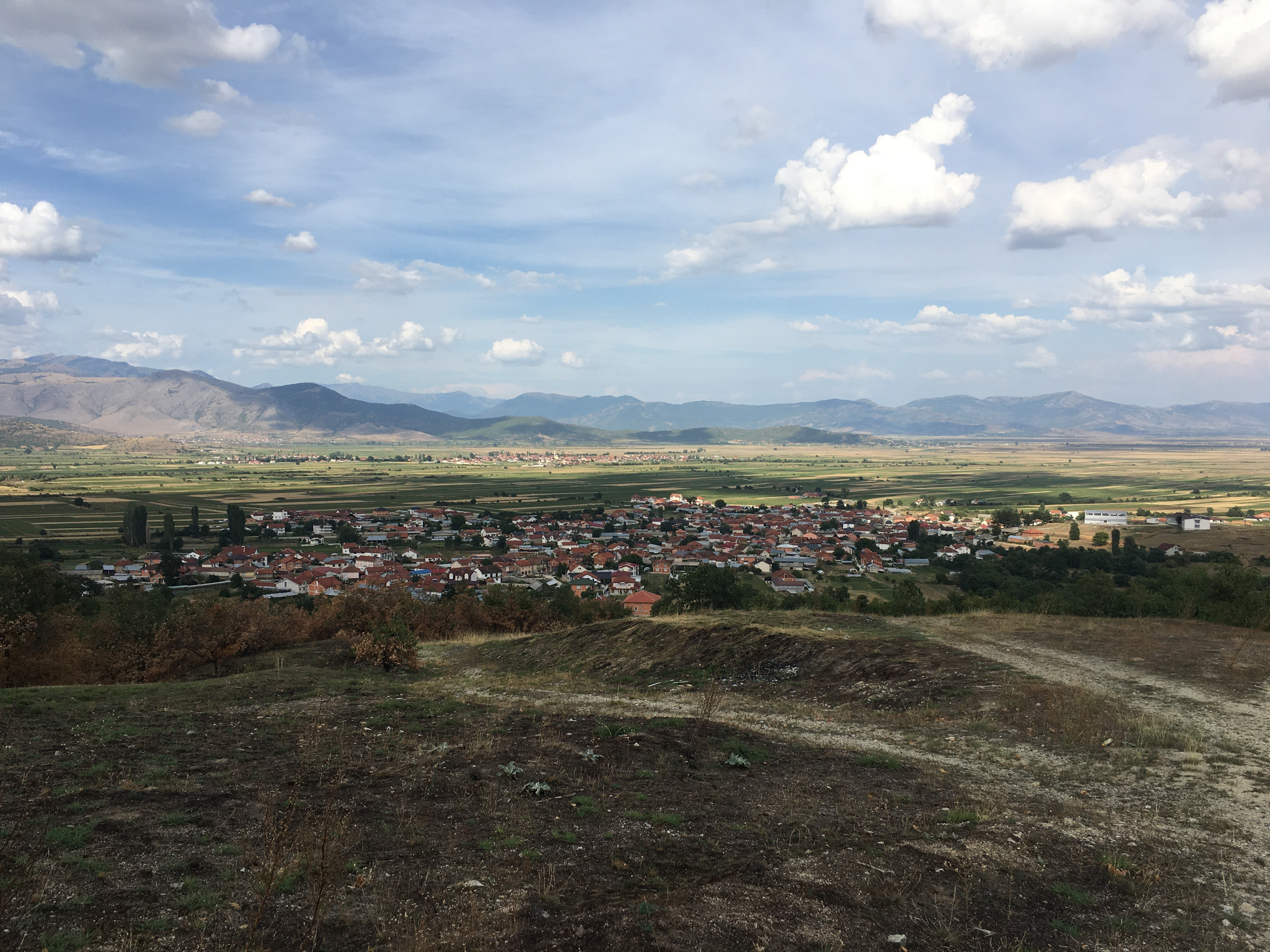
- View of the village

- Location within North Macedonia
- Coordinates: 41°28′36″N 21°27′41″E
- Country: North Macedonia
- Region: Pelagonia
- Municipality: Dolneni
- Elevation: 644 m (2,113 ft)

Population (2021)
  - Total: 1,690
- Time zone: UTC+1 (CET)
  - Summer (DST): UTC+2 (CEST)
- Area code: +38948
- Car plates: PP
- Website: .

Žitoše (Macedonian: Житоше, Albanian: Zhitosh) is a village in the municipality of Dolneni, North Macedonia. It used to be a municipality of its own and its FIPS code was MKC4.

== Demographics ==
According to the 2021 census, the village had a total of 1.690 inhabitants. Ethnic groups in the village include:

- Albanians 1.280
- Bosniaks 354
- Turks 10
- Serbs 3
- Macedonians 1
- Others 42

Year	Macedonian	Albanian	Turks	Romani	Vlachs	Serbs	Bosniaks	Others	Total
2002	3	1.158	17	...	...	5	604	20	1.807
2021	1	1.280	10	...	...	3	354	42	1.690

== Sports ==
The local football club FK Bratstvo 07 plays in the Macedonian Second Football League.

== Notable people ==
- Musa Ibraimi, Macedonian politician
