= Marena =

Marena Марена
- Village
- Location within North Macedonia
- Coordinates: 41.466235°N 22.028610°E
- Country: North Macedonia
- Region: Vardar
- Municipality: Kavadarci

Population (2002)
  - Total: 997
- Time zone: UTC+1 (CET)
  - Summer (DST): UTC+2 (CEST)
- Website: .

Marena (Macedonian: Марена) is a village in the municipality of Kavadarci, North Macedonia.

== Demographics ==
According to the statistics of Bulgarian ethnographer Vasil Kanchov from 1900, 576 inhabitants lived in Marena, 300 Muslim Bulgarians, 270 Christian Bulgarians and 6 Romani. On the 1927 ethnic map of Leonhard Schulze-Jena, the village is shown as having a mixed population of Bulgarians and Muslim Bulgarians. According to the 2002 census, the village had a total of 997 inhabitants. Ethnic groups in the village include:

- Macedonians 903
- Serbs 21
- Romani 71
- Others 2

== Sports ==
Local football club FK Marena play in the Macedonian Third League (Center Division).
