= Grešnica =

Grešnica Грешница Greshnicë
- Village
- Location within North Macedonia
- Coordinates: 41°34′29″N 20°55′53″E
- Country: North Macedonia
- Region: Southwestern
- Municipality: Kičevo

Population (2021)
  - Total: 789
- Time zone: UTC+01:00 (CET)
  - Summer (DST): UTC+02:00 (CEST)
- Car plates: KI

Grešnica (Macedonian: Грешница, Albanian: Greshnicë) is a village in Kičevo Municipality, North Macedonia. It used to be part of the former Zajas Municipality, North Macedonia.

== History ==
During the period of 1912-1913, members the Serbian army massacred a total of 11 Albanian men from the village. A further 13 Albanian civilians would be killed in 1941 by the Royal Yugoslav Army and Partisan forces. Ballist guerrilla activity continued in the village until February of 1946 under the leadership of Grešnica native Mefmet Ollomani.

== Demographics ==
The village is attested in the 1467/68 Ottoman tax registry (defter) for the Nahiyah of Kırçova. The village had a total of 63 houses, excluding bachelors (mucerred).

As of the 2021 census, Grešnica had 789 residents with the following ethnic composition:

- Albanians 764
- Persons for whom data are taken from administrative sources 24
- Others 1

According to the 2002 census, the village had a total of 1480 inhabitants. Ethnic groups in the village include:

- Albanians 1475
- Macedonians 2
- Others 3

== Sports ==
Local football club KF Xixa plays in the Macedonian Municipal Football Leagues league.
