= Sredno Konjari =

Sredno Konjari Средно Коњари Konjar i Mesëm
- Village
- Location within North Macedonia
- Coordinates: 41°57′N 21°43′E
- Country: North Macedonia
- Region: Skopje
- Municipality: Petrovec

Population (2021)
  - Total: 1,211
- Time zone: UTC+1 (CET)
  - Summer (DST): UTC+2 (CEST)
- Car plates: SK
- Website: .

Sredno Konjari (Macedonian: Средно Коњари, Albanian: Konjar i Mesëm) is a village in the municipality of Petrovec, North Macedonia.

== Demographics ==
As of the 2021 census, Sredno Konjari had 1,211 residents with the following ethnic composition:

- Albanians 608
- Bosniaks 462
- Turks 89
- Persons for whom data are taken from administrative sources 41
- Macedonians 7
- Others 4

According to the 2002 census, the village had a total of 1140 inhabitants. Ethnic groups in the village include:

- Albanians 667
- Bosniaks 402
- Turks 61
- Others 9
