= FK Petrovec =

- Full name: Fudbalski klub Petrovec
- Founded: 1998; 27 years ago
- Ground: Stadion Petrovec
- Chairman: Dejan Cvetanovski
- Manager: Vasile Janeski
- League: OFS Gazi Baba
- 2023–24: Third League (North), 13th (relegated)
Home colours

FK Petrovec (Macedonian: ФК Петровец) is a football club based in the village of Petrovec near Skopje, North Macedonia. They are currently competing in the OFS Gazi Baba league.
