= Udovo =

Udovo Удово
- Village
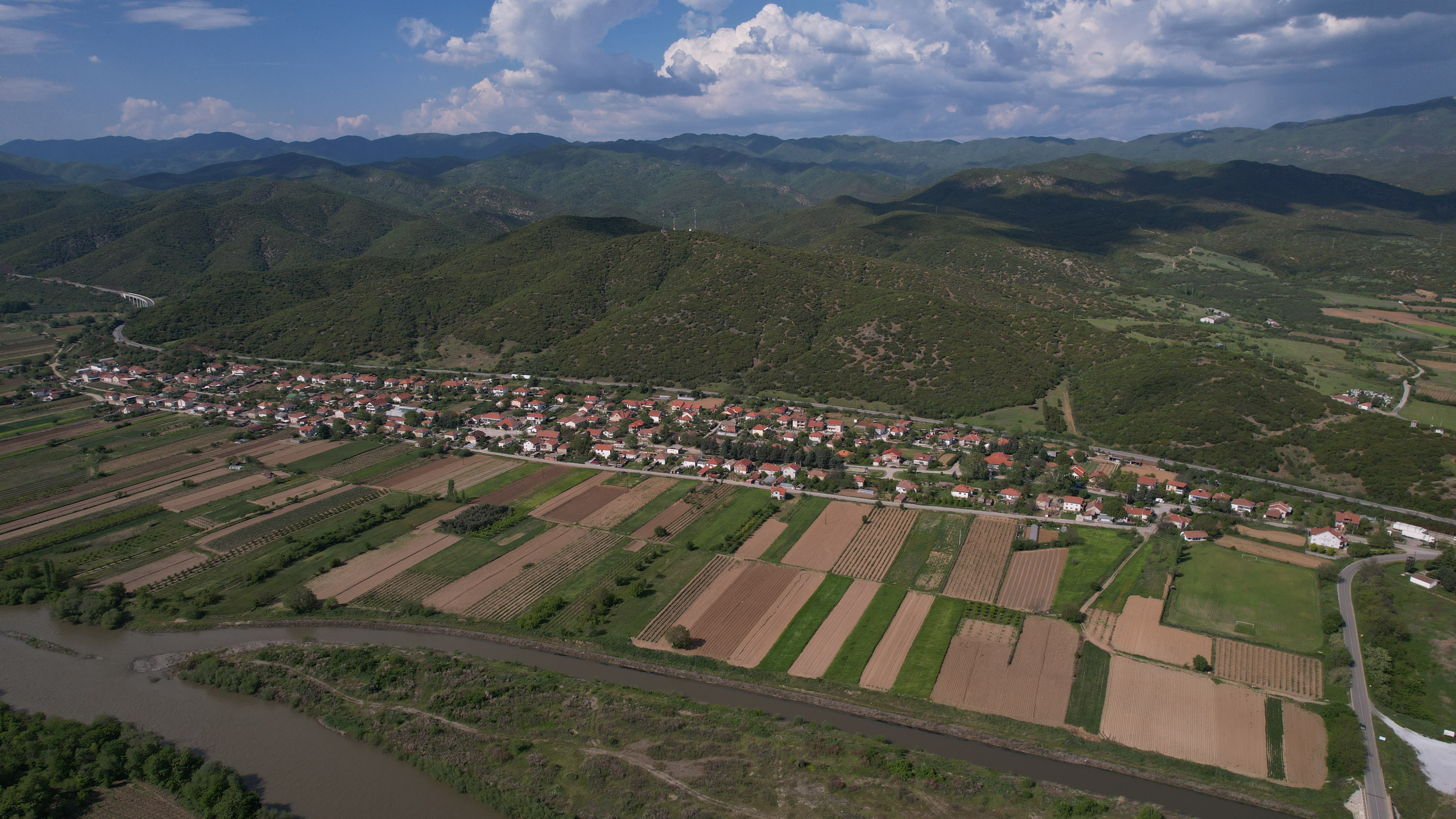
- Air view of Udovo

- Location within North Macedonia
- Country: North Macedonia
- Region: Southeastern
- Municipality: Valandovo
- Elevation: 60 m (200 ft)

Population (2021)
  - Total: 766
- Time zone: UTC+1 (CET)
- Area code: +38934

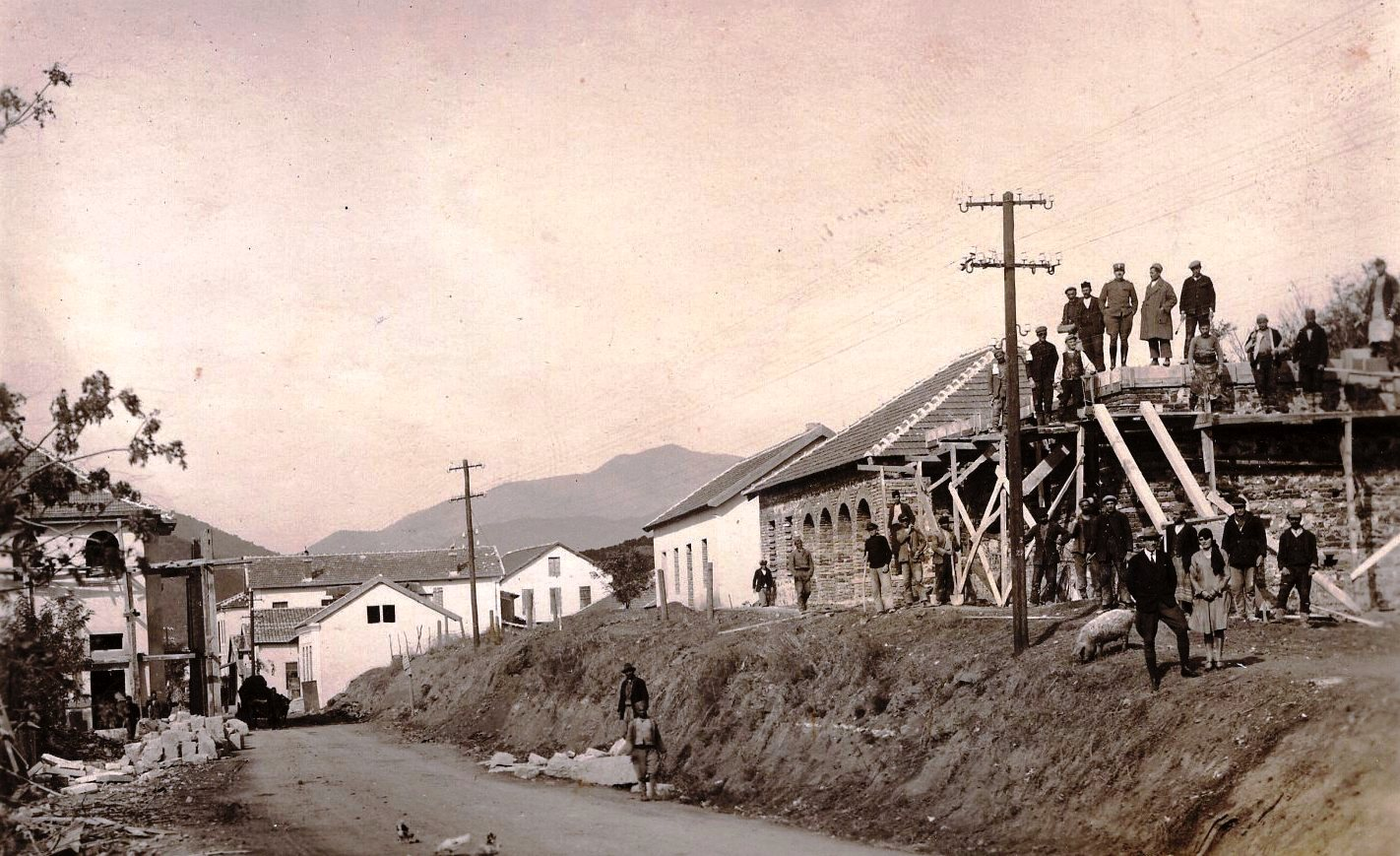
Village Udovo, 1931

Udovo (Macedonian: Удово) is a village in the southeastern part of North Macedonia, near the city of Valandovo, and under the Valandovo Municipality.

== History ==
Udovo is an old inhabited place, before the First Balkan War many Turks lived in the town. The old village of Udovo was located in present lower neighbourhood (Lower Udovo). Few turkish houses existed in upper neighbourhood of Udovo (Upper Udovo). After wars Turks migrated to Turkey.

== Demographics ==
According to the 2002 census, the village had a total of 851 inhabitants. Ethnic groups in the village include:

- Macedonians 838
- Turks 7
- Serbs 2
- Others 4

As of 2021, the village of Udovo has 766 inhabitants and the ethnic composition was the following:

- Macedonians – 738
- Turks – 11
- Serbs – 3
- others – 2
- Person without Data - 12

== Sports ==
Local football club FK Mladost plays in the Macedonian Third League (Southeast Division).
