= Krušeani =

Krušeani / Krusheani Крушеани
- Village
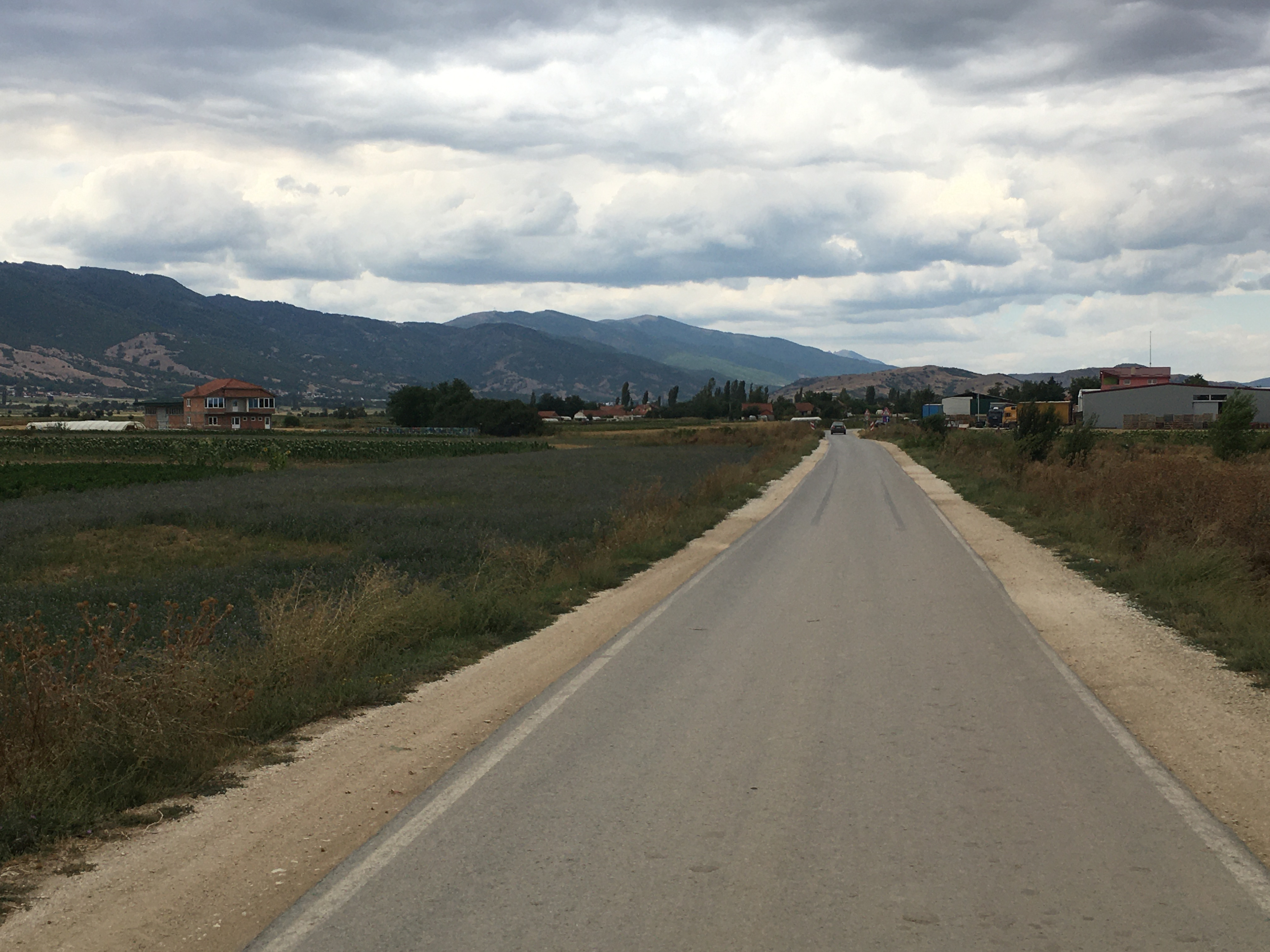
- View of the village

- Location within North Macedonia
- Coordinates: 41°18′40″N 21°20′55″E
- Country: North Macedonia
- Region: Pelagonia
- Municipality: Krivogaštani
- Elevation: 567 m (1,860 ft)

Population (2002)
  - Total: 578
- Time zone: UTC+1 (CET)
- Area code: +38948

Krusheani (Macedonian: Крушеани) is a village in the Krivogaštani municipality (near Prilep) in North Macedonia.

== Demographics ==
Krušeani appears in the 1467-68 Ottoman defter. The register displayed a largely mixed Slavic-Albanian anthroponymy, with instances of individuals bearing both Slavic and Albanian names. The names are: Gjon son of Dimitri, Stojko son of Dominiko, Pejo son of Dominiko, Nikola son of Jorgjo, Gura son of Dominiko, Gjergji son of Spasa.

According to the 2002 census, the village had a total of 578 inhabitants. Ethnic groups in the village include:

- Macedonians 574
- Serbs 1
- Others 3
