= SSK Nova =

- Full name: Fudbalski klub SSK Nova
- Founded: 1965; 60 years ago 2009; 16 years ago (refounded)
- Ground: Stadion SSK
- Chairman: Jovo Pavleski
- Manager: Ljupcho Trajkovski
- League: OFS Kisela Voda
- 2023–24: Third League (North), 14th (relegated)

FK SSK Nova (Macedonian: ФК ССК Нова) is a Macedonian football club based in the town of Drachevo in Skopje, North Macedonia. They currently play in the OFS Kisela Voda league.

== History ==
The club was founded in 1965, and was refounded in 2009.
