= Golema Rečica =

Golema Rečica Голема Речица Reçicë e Madhe
- Village
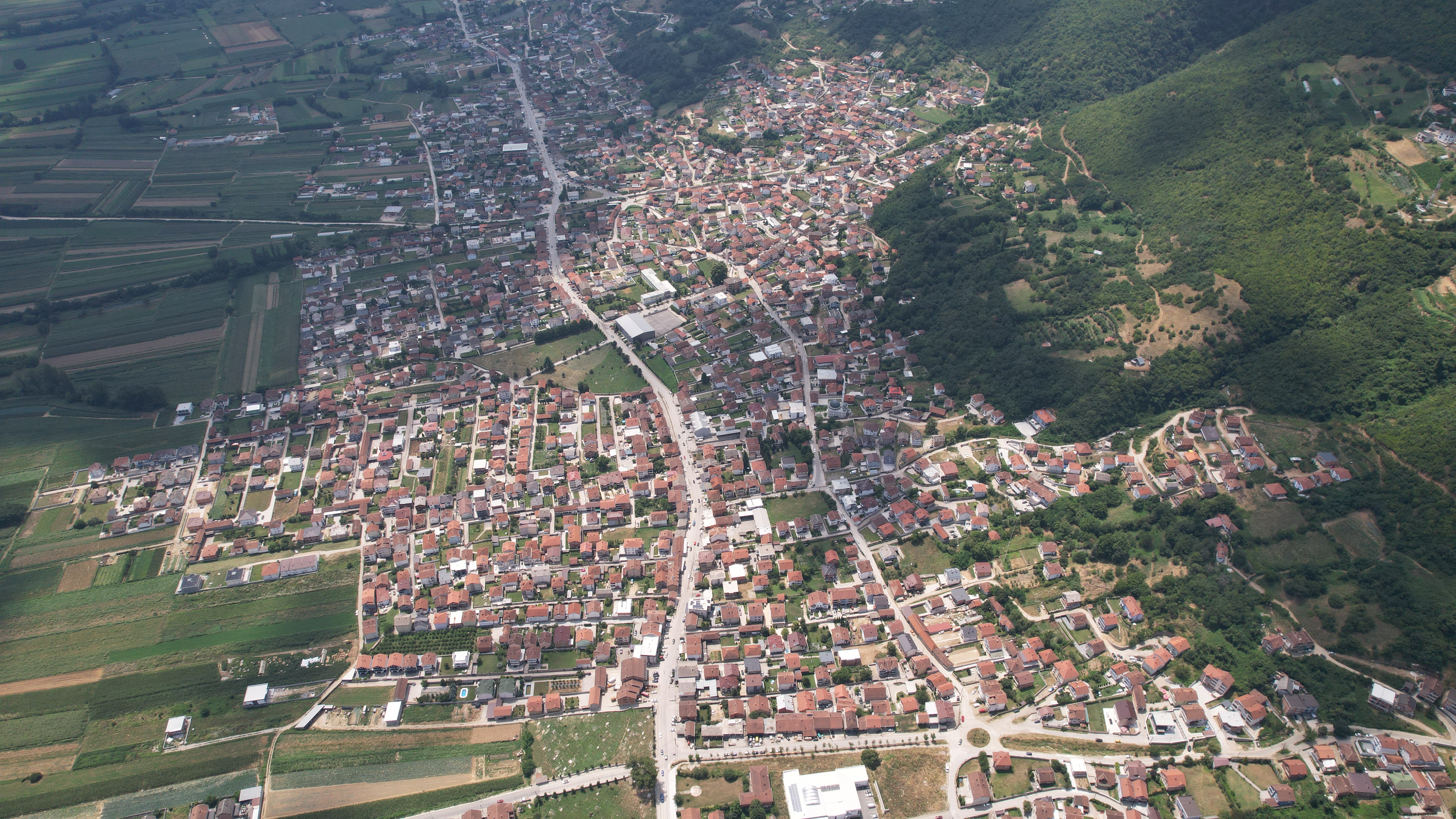
- Air view of the village

- Location within North Macedonia
- Coordinates: 41°59′N 20°57′E
- Country: North Macedonia
- Region: Polog
- Municipality: Tetovo

Population (2021)
  - Total: 3.604
- Time zone: UTC+1 (CET)
  - Summer (DST): UTC+2 (CEST)
- Car plates: TE
- Website: .

Golema Rečica (Macedonian: Голема Речица, Albanian: Reçicë e Madhe) is a village in the municipality of Tetovo, North Macedonia.

== Demographics ==
Golema Rečica is attested in the 1467/68 Ottoman tax registry (defter) for the Nahiyah of Kalkandelen. The village had a total of 100 Christian households, 5 bachelors and 23 widows.

According to the 2021 census, the village had a total of 3.604 inhabitants. Ethnic groups in the village include:

- Albanians 3.422
- Macedonians 1
- Others 181

Year	Macedonian	Albanian	Turks	Romani	Vlachs	Serbs	Bosniaks	Others	Total
2002	4	3.949	...	...	...	...	...	24	3.977
2021	1	3.422	...	...	...	...	...	181	3.604

According to the 1942 Albanian census, Golema Rečica was inhabited by 1303 Muslim Albanians.

In statistics gathered by Vasil Kanchov in 1900, the village of Golema Rečica was inhabited by 380 Muslim Albanians.

== Sports ==
Local football club KF Reçica plays in the Macedonian Third League (West Division).
