= Vasilevo, North Macedonia =

Vasilevo Василево
- Location within North Macedonia
- Coordinates: 41°28′33″N 22°38′30″E
- Country: North Macedonia
- Region: Southeastern
- Municipality: Vasilevo

Population (2021)
  - Total: 2,175
- Time zone: UTC+1 (CET)
  - Summer (DST): UTC+2 (CEST)
- Vehicle registration: SR

Vasilevo (Macedonian: Василево) is a village in North Macedonia. It is a seat of the Vasilevo municipality.

== Demographics ==
As of the 2021 census, Vasilevo had 2,175 residents with the following ethnic composition:

- Macedonians 1,450
- Turks 352
- Persons for whom data are taken from administrative sources 314
- Others 36
- Roma 21
- Serbian - 2

According to the 2002 census, the village had a total of 2,174 inhabitants. Ethnic groups in the village include:

- Macedonians 1,819
- Turks 349
- Others 6

== Sports ==
Local football club FK Vasilevo plays in the Macedonian Third League (Southeast Division).
