= FK Vasilevo =

- Full name: Fudbalski Klub Vasilevo
- Founded: 1950; 75 years ago
- Ground: Stadion Vasilevo
Home colours

FK Vasilevo (Macedonian: ФК Василево) is a football club based in the village of Vasilevo near Strumica, North Macedonia. They were recently competed in the Macedonian Third League (East Division).

== History ==
The club was founded in 1950.
