= Nerašte =

Nerasht Нераште Nerasht
- Village
- Location within North Macedonia
- Coordinates: 42°06′N 21°06′E
- Country: North Macedonia
- Region: Polog
- Municipality: Tearce

Population (2021)
  - Total: 2,724
- Time zone: UTC+1 (CET)
  - Summer (DST): UTC+2 (CEST)
- Postal code: 1203
- Car plates: TE
- Website: .

Nerasht (Macedonian: Нераште, Albanian: Nerasht) is a village in the municipality of Tearce, North Macedonia.

== History ==
Nerašte is attested in the 1467/68 Ottoman tax registry (defter) for the Nahiyah of Kalkandelen. The village had a total of 29 Christian households, 1 bachelors and 2 widows.

According to the 1467-68 Ottoman defter, Nerašte exhibits Orthodox Christian Slavic anthroponyms.

== Demographics ==
As of the 2021 census, Nerašte had 2,724 residents with the following ethnic composition:

- Albanians 2,670
- Persons for whom data are taken from administrative sources 51
- Macedonians 2
- Others 1

According to the 2002 census, the village had a total of 3,485 inhabitants. Ethnic groups in the village include:

- Albanians 3478
- Others 7

In statistics gathered by Vasil Kanchov in 1900, the village of Nerašte was inhabited by 465 Muslim Albanians.
