= KF Xixa =

- Full name: Klubi Futbollistik Xixa Greshnicë
- Founded: 2015; 10 years ago
- Ground: AMS Kichevo
- Capacity: 100
- League: OFS Kičevo
- 2018–19: Macedonian Third League (West), 12th
Home colours

KF Xixa (Macedonian: ФК Ѕиѕа Грешница, romanized: FK Dzidza Grešnica) is a football club based in the village of Grešnica, Kičevo, North Macedonia. They are currently competing in the OFS Kičevo league.

== History ==
The club was founded in 2015.
