= Volkovo, Gjorče Petrov =

Volkovo Волково
- Village
- Село Волково
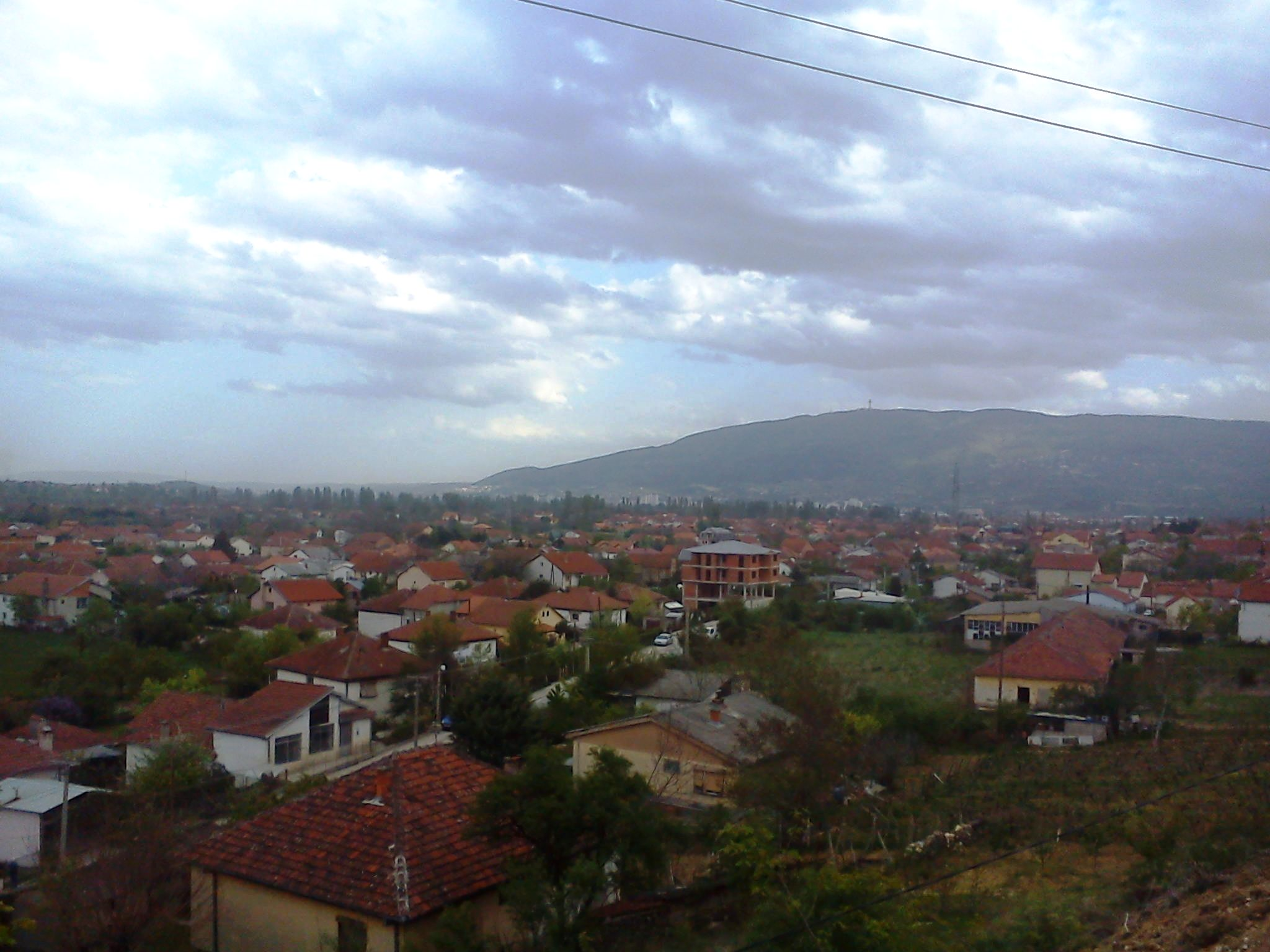
- View of buildings in Volkovo, Macedonia

- Location within North Macedonia
- Coordinates: 42.0459°N 21.3460°E
- Country: North Macedonia
- Region: Skopje
- Municipality: Gjorče Petrov

Population (2002)
  - Total: 6,750
- Time zone: UTC+1 (CET)
  - Summer (DST): UTC+2 (CEST)
- Car plates: SK

Volkovo (Macedonian: Волково) is a village in the municipality of Gjorče Petrov, North Macedonia. It is located on the northwestern outskirts of Skopje.

== Demographics ==
According to the 2002 census, the village had a total of 6750 inhabitants. Ethnic groups in the village include:

- Macedonians 6187
- Bosniaks 1
- Serbs 429
- Romani 45
- Aromanians 5
- Others 83
