= FK Mladost Udovo =

Mladost Udovo
- Full name: Fudbalski klub Mladost Udovo
- Founded: 1950; 76 years ago
- Ground: Stadion Udovo
- Chairman: Mladen Neveselov
- League: Macedonian Third League (South)
- 2018–19: 3rd
Home colours

FK Mladost Udovo (Macedonian: ФК Младост Удово) is a football club based in the village of Udovo in North Macedonia. It was founded in 1950, and is currently competing in the Macedonian Third League (South Division).
