= Grnčari =

Grnčari Грнчари Gërçar Grınçar
- Village
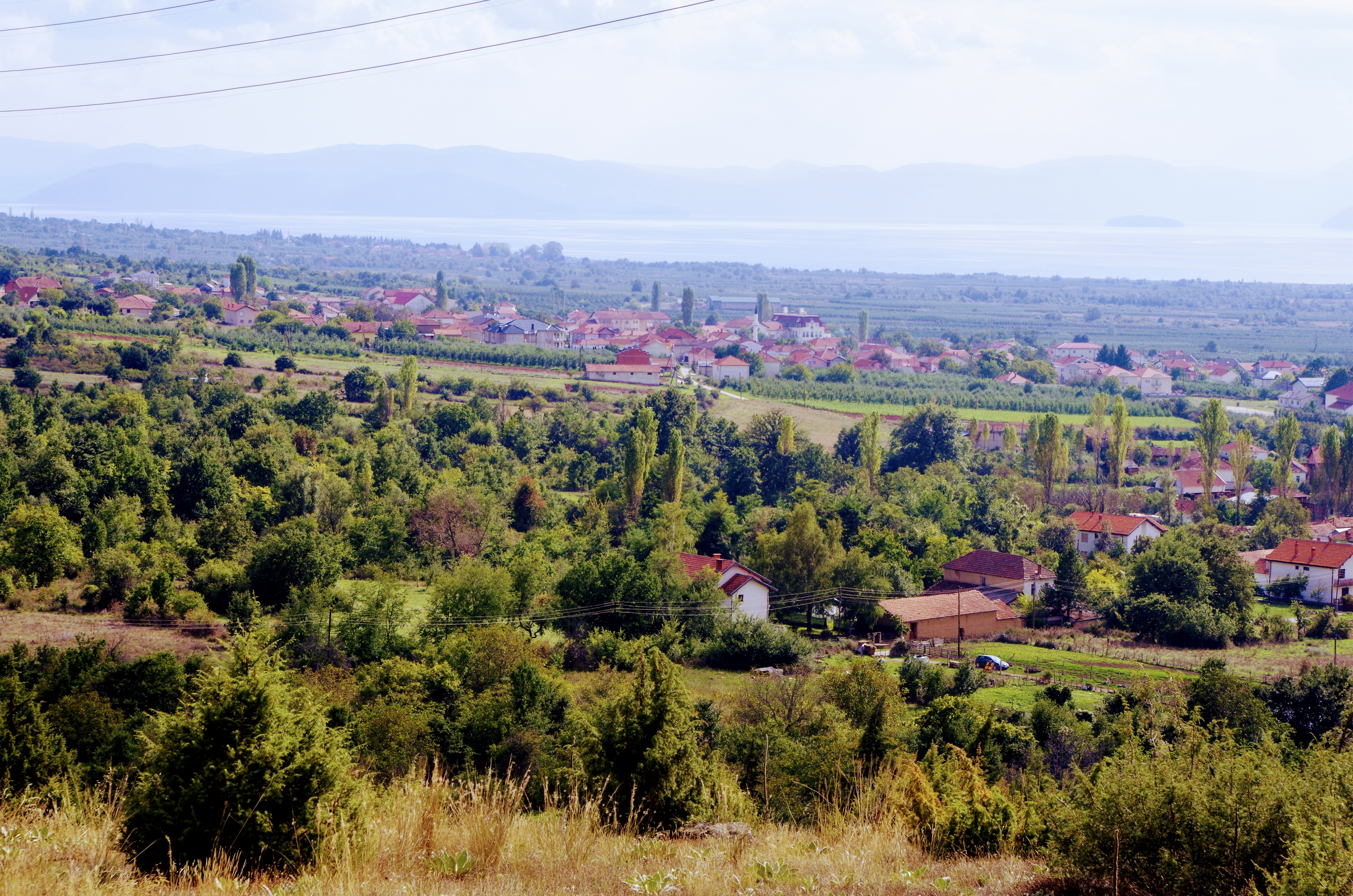
- Panoramic view of the village

- Location within North Macedonia
- Coordinates: 41°01′06″N 21°03′12″E
- Country: North Macedonia
- Region: Pelagonia
- Municipality: Resen

Population (2021)
  - Total: 311
- Time zone: UTC+1 (CET)
  - Summer (DST): UTC+2 (CEST)
- Area code: +389
- Car plates: RE

Grnčari (Macedonian: Грнчари, Albanian: Gërçar, Turkish: Grınçar) is a village in the Resen Municipality of North Macedonia. Located just under 9 kilometres (5.6 mi) from the municipal centre of Resen, the village has 417 residents.

== Demographics ==
The village of Grnčari is inhabited by a Sunni Muslim Albanian speaking majority and Orthodox Macedonian minority. A few Turkish speaking families are also present in Grnčari. Sunni Albanians in Grnčari traditionally highlighted their religious identity over a linguistic one having closer economic and social relations with Turks and Macedonian Muslims in the region and being distant from Orthodox Macedonians. Over time these differences have disappeared through intermarriage, closer communal and cultural relations with Bektashi and other Sunni Prespa Albanian communities in the region.

In statistics gathered by Vasil Kanchov in 1900, the village of Grnčari was inhabited by 165 Bulgarian Christians and 300 Muslim Albanians. In 1905 in statistics gathered by Dimitar Mishev Brancoff, Grnčari was inhabited by 120 Bulgarian Exarchists and 360 Muslim Albanians. After World War Two, some Albanian settlements in Yugoslavia declared themselves as Turks due to the word being a generic term for Muslims or pressure by Yugoslav authorities to do so. In the 2002 census, Albanians form a large ethnic majority in the village.

Ethnic group	census 1961		census 1971		census 1981		census 1991		census 1994		census 2002		census 2021	
Ethnic group	Number	%	Number	%	Number	%	Number	%	Number	%	Number	%	Number	%
Macedonians	170	17.7	157	15.0	164	13.6	102	12.6	92	19.3	79	18.9	54	17.4
Albanians	194	20.2	838	79.9	963	79.9	354	43.8	362	76.1	326	78.2	230	74.0
Turks	597	62.1	49	4.8	61	5.1	43	5.3	22	4.6	11	2.6	4	1.3
others	1	0.1	5	0.5	17	1.4	309	38.2	0	0.0	1	0.2	1	0.3
Persons for whom data are taken from administrative sources													22	7.1
Total	962		1,049		1,205		808		476		417		311	

== Sports ==
Local football club KF Lirija Gërçar play in the Macedonian Third League (Southwest Division).

== Gallery ==
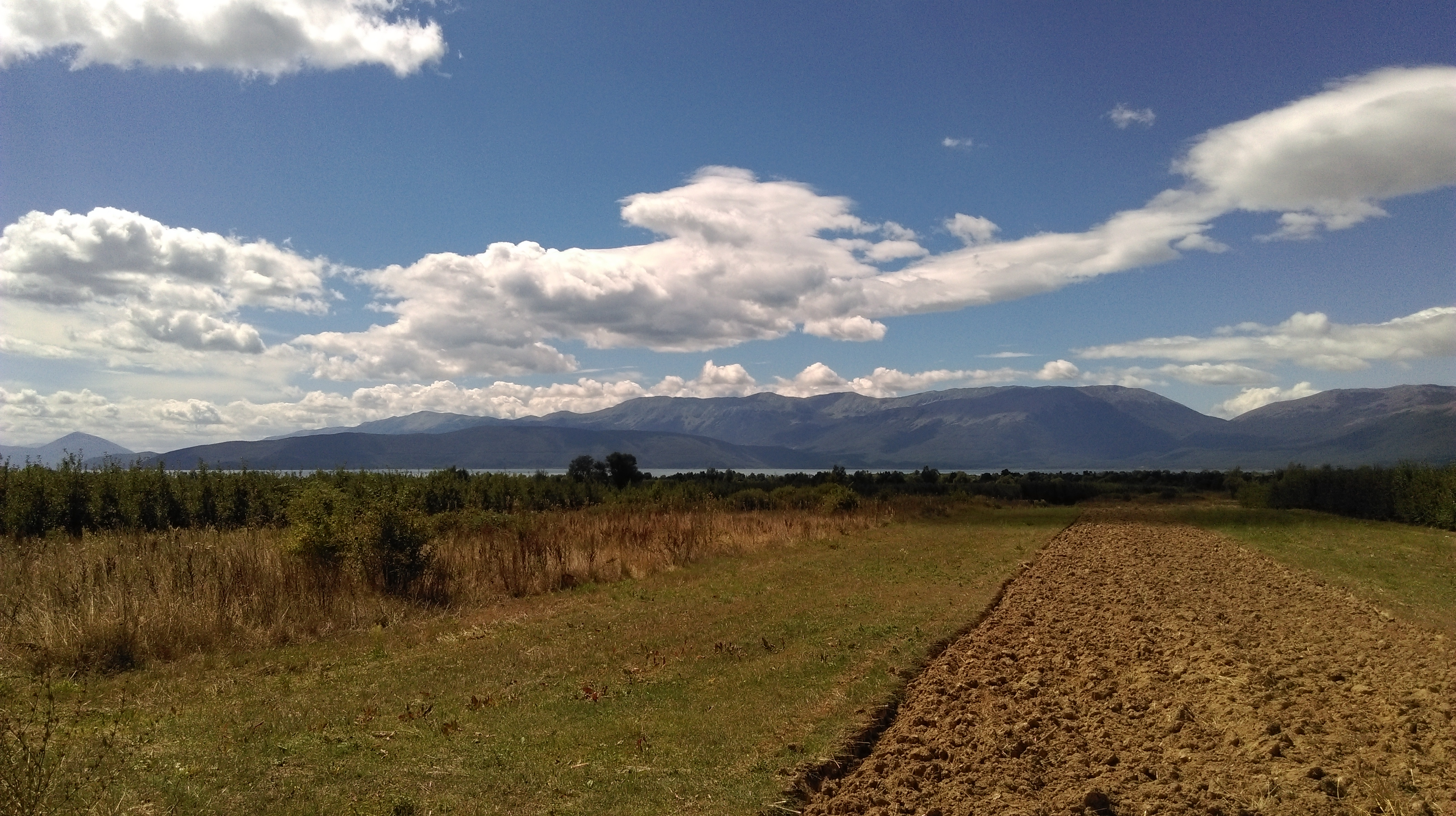
Fields of Grnčari, with Lake Prespa and Galičica mountains in the background

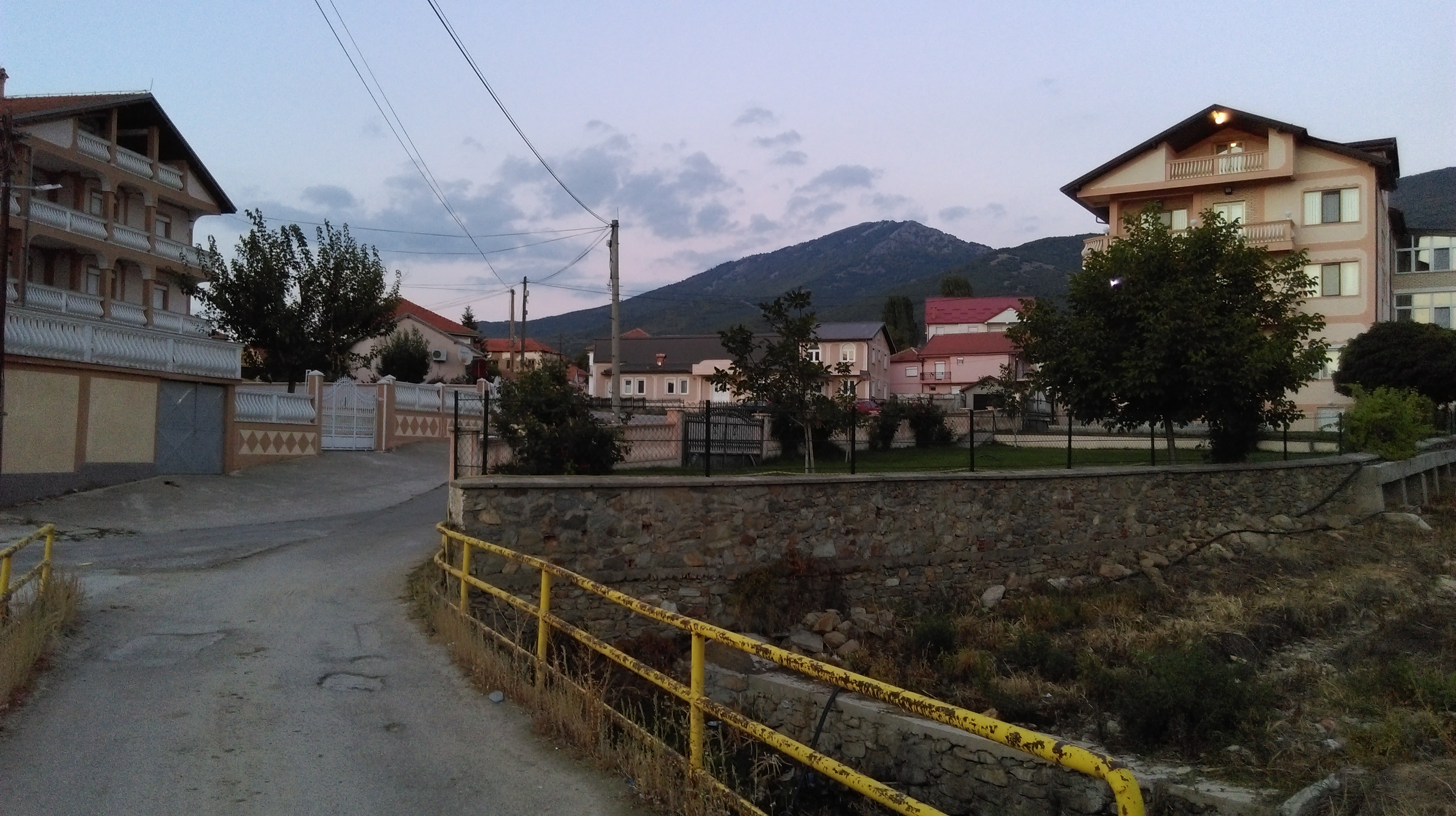
Architecture of Grnčari

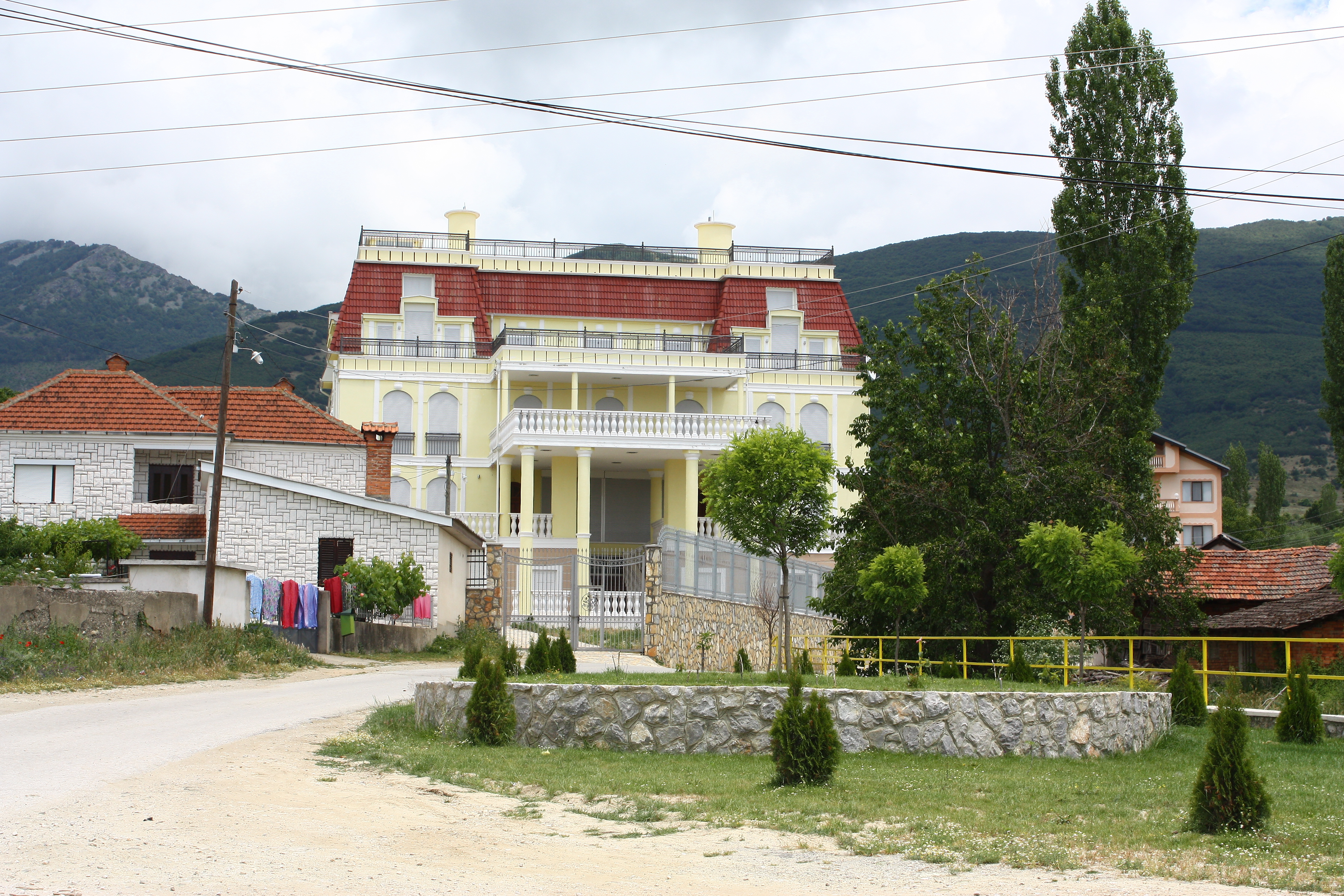
A house modeled on the Resen Saraj mansion of Niyaz bey.

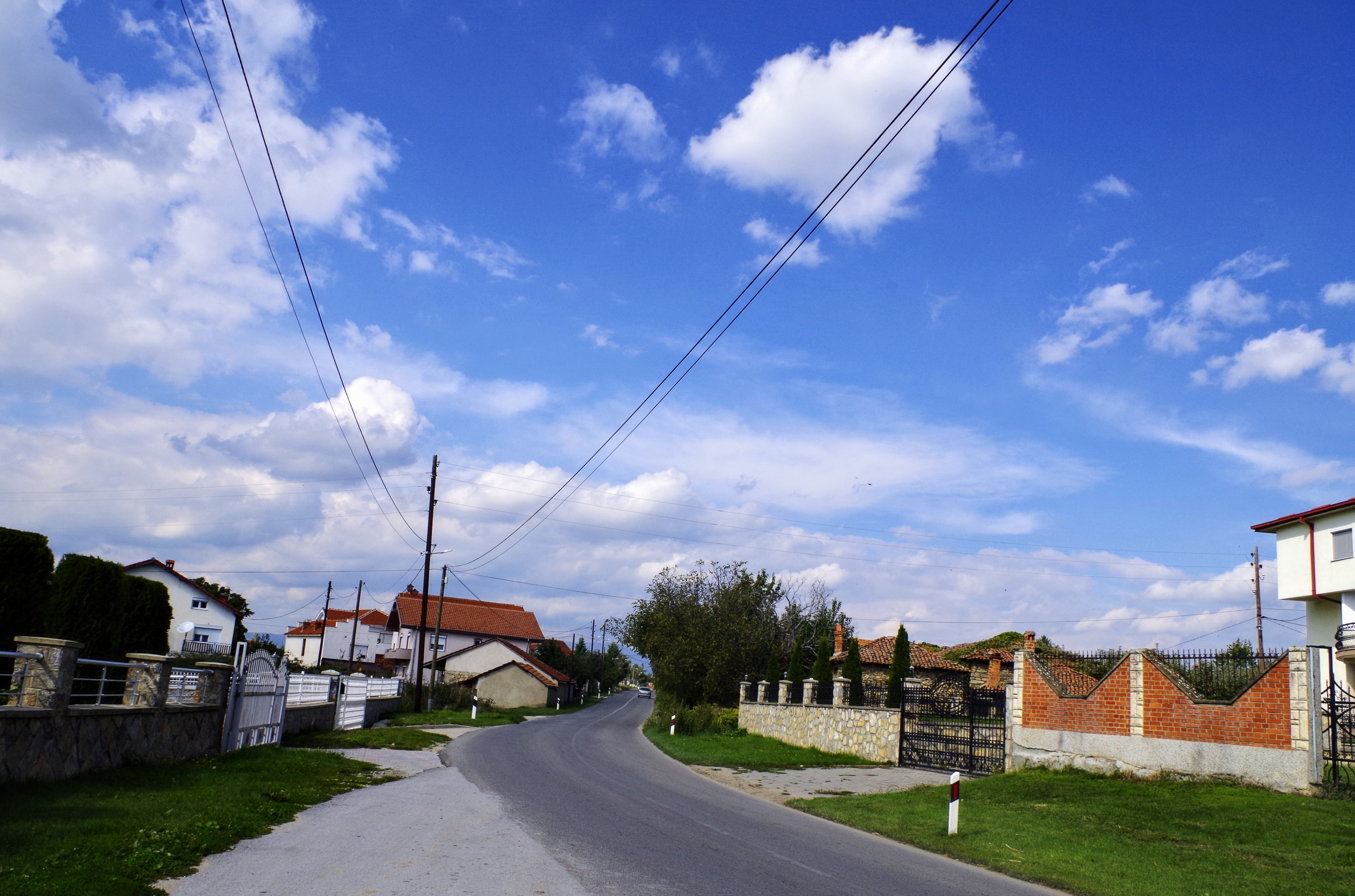
View from Grnčari of the road toward Podmočani.

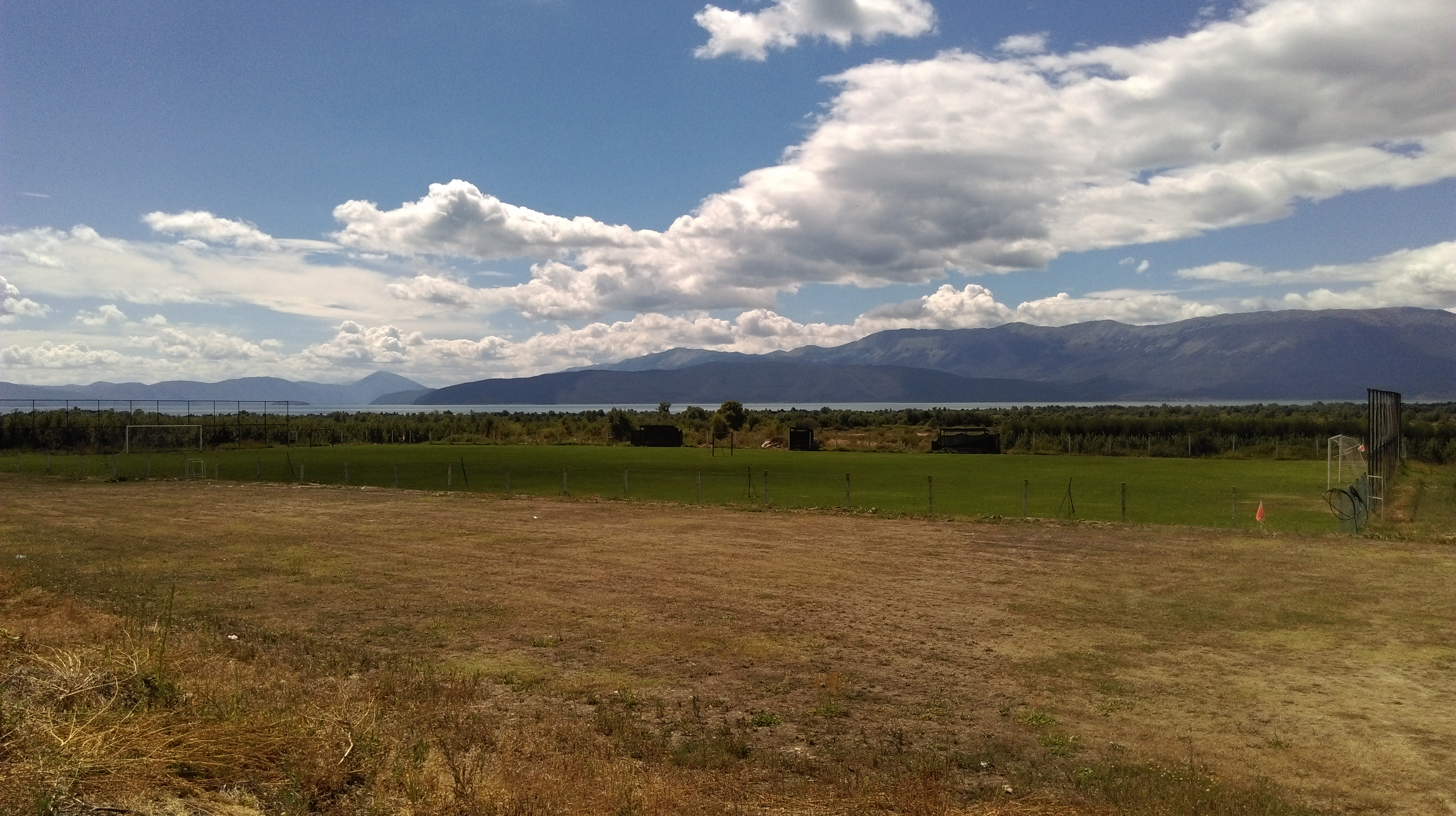
Local football ground of Grnčari football team

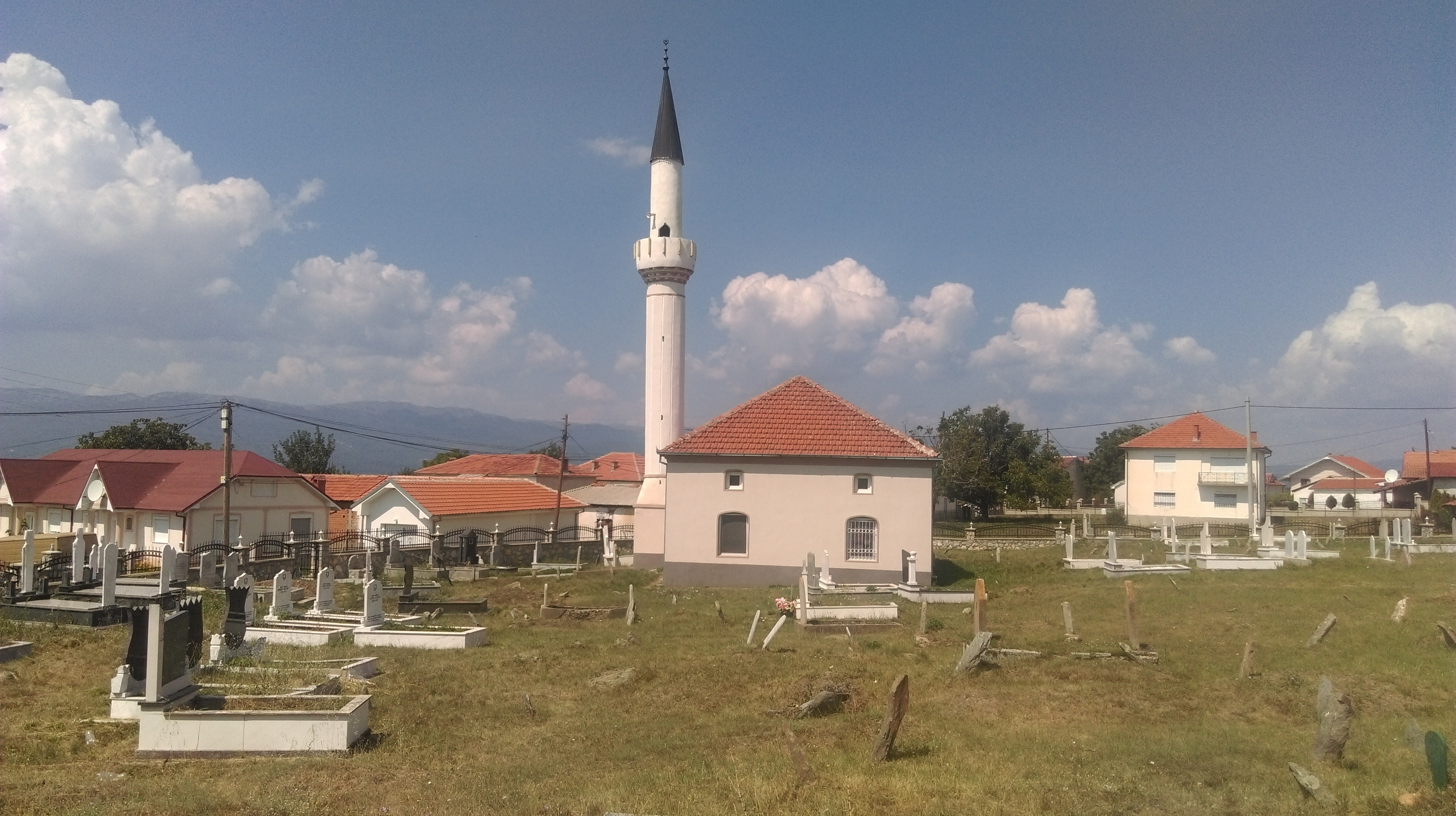
Mosque and Muslim cemetery of Grnčari

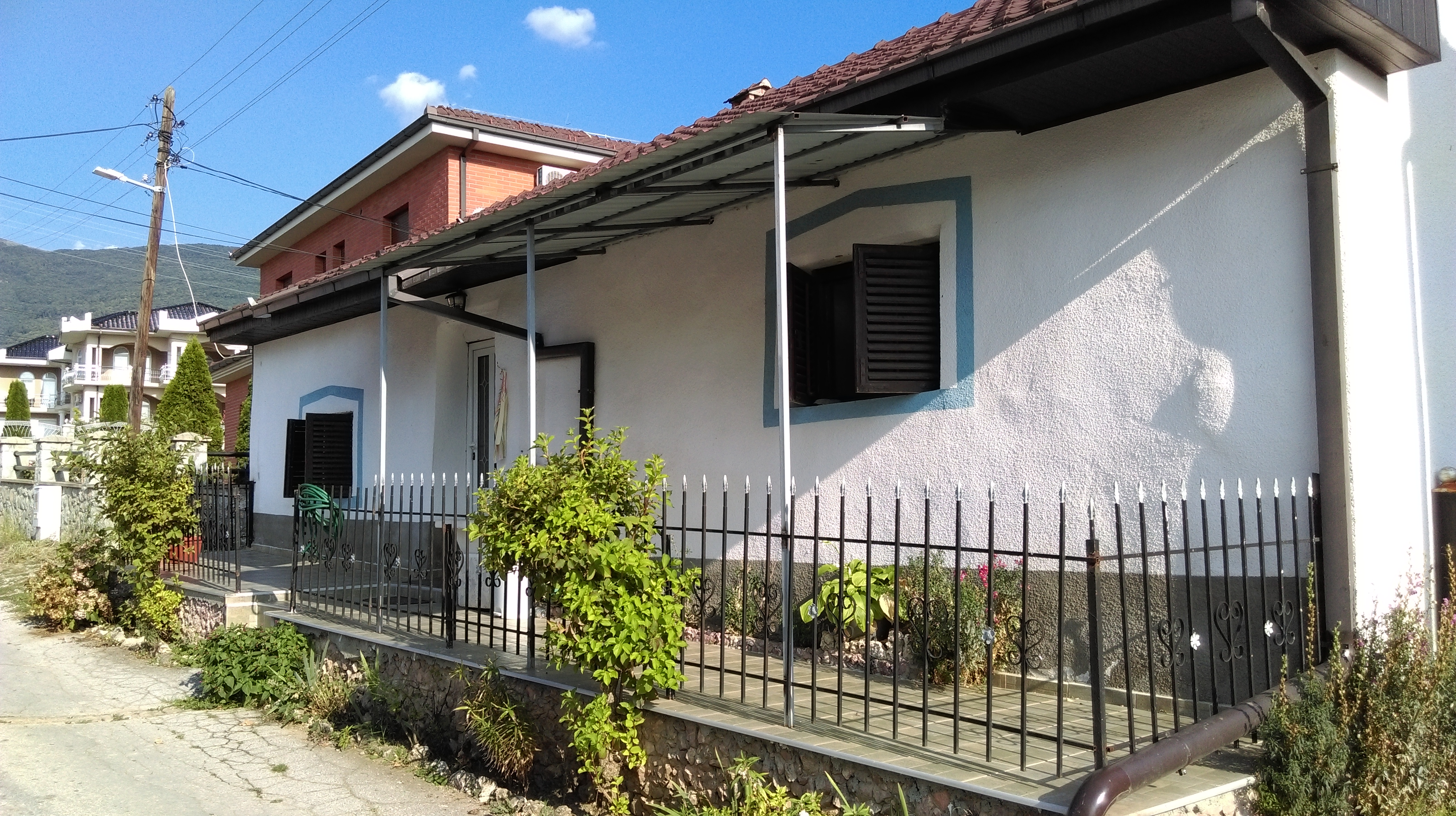
Tekke of Sali Baba, Grnčari

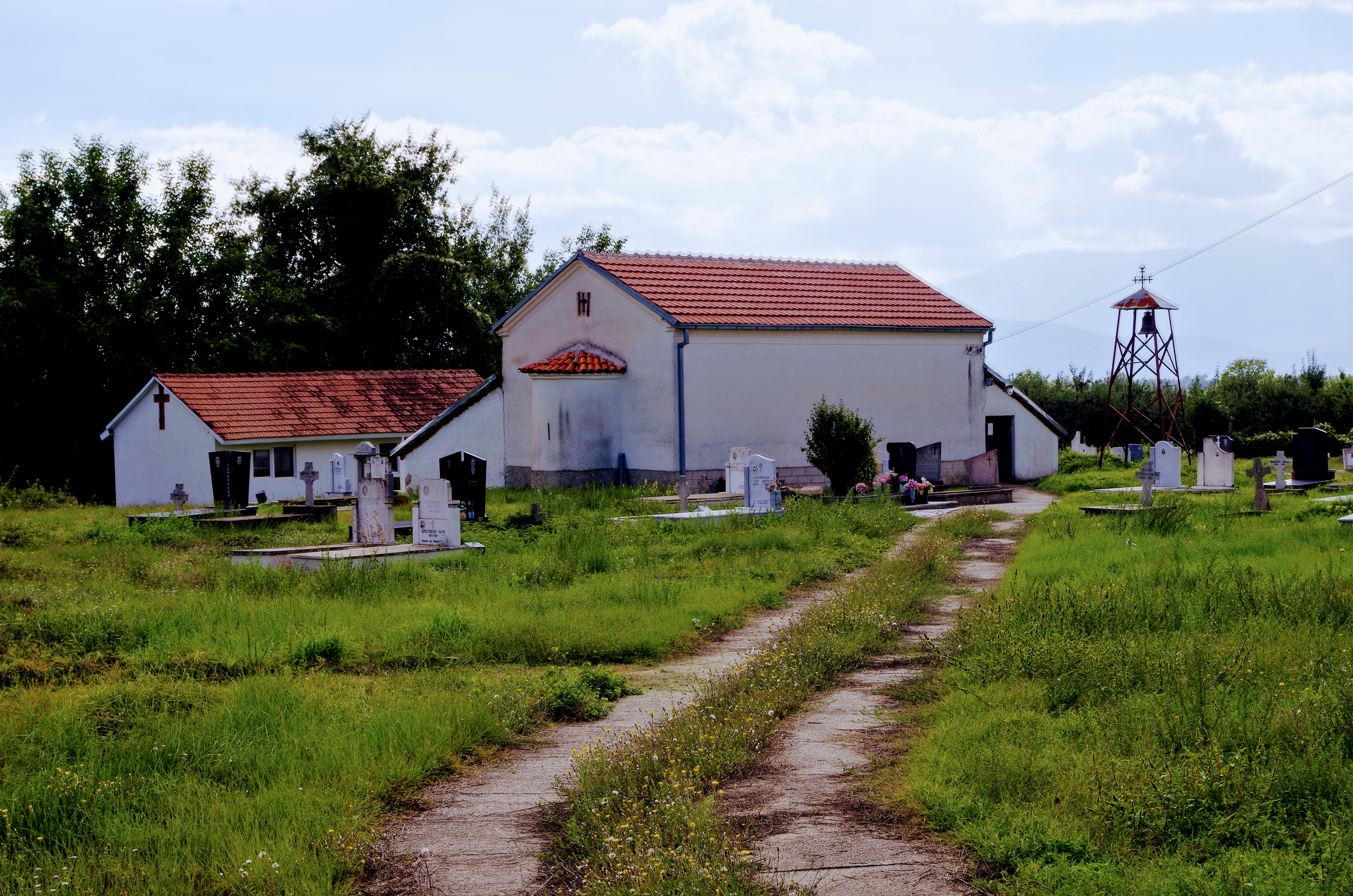
Church of St. Athanasius and Orthodox cemetery, Grnčari

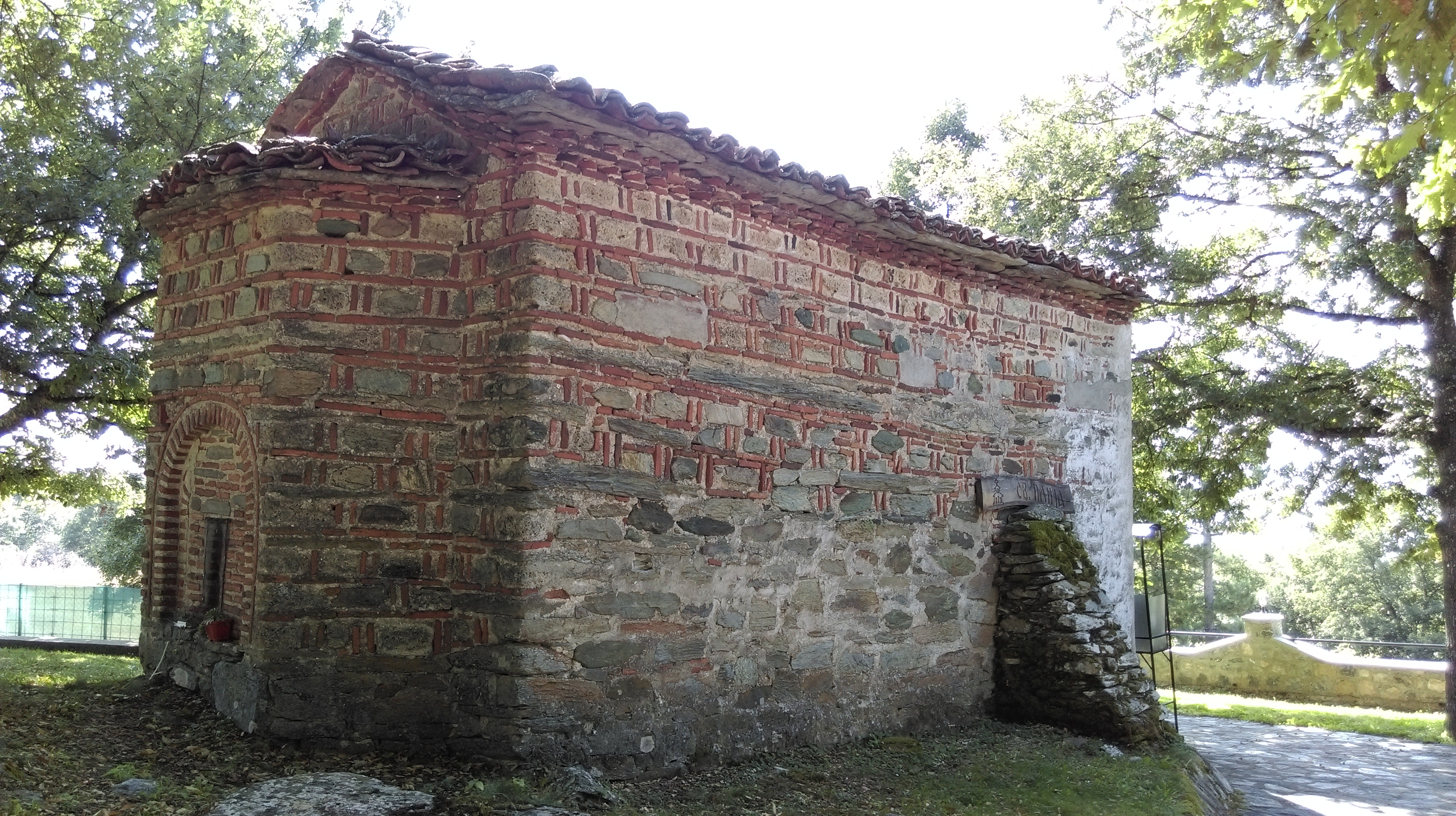
St. Elijah Monastery, Grnčari (built 18th century)

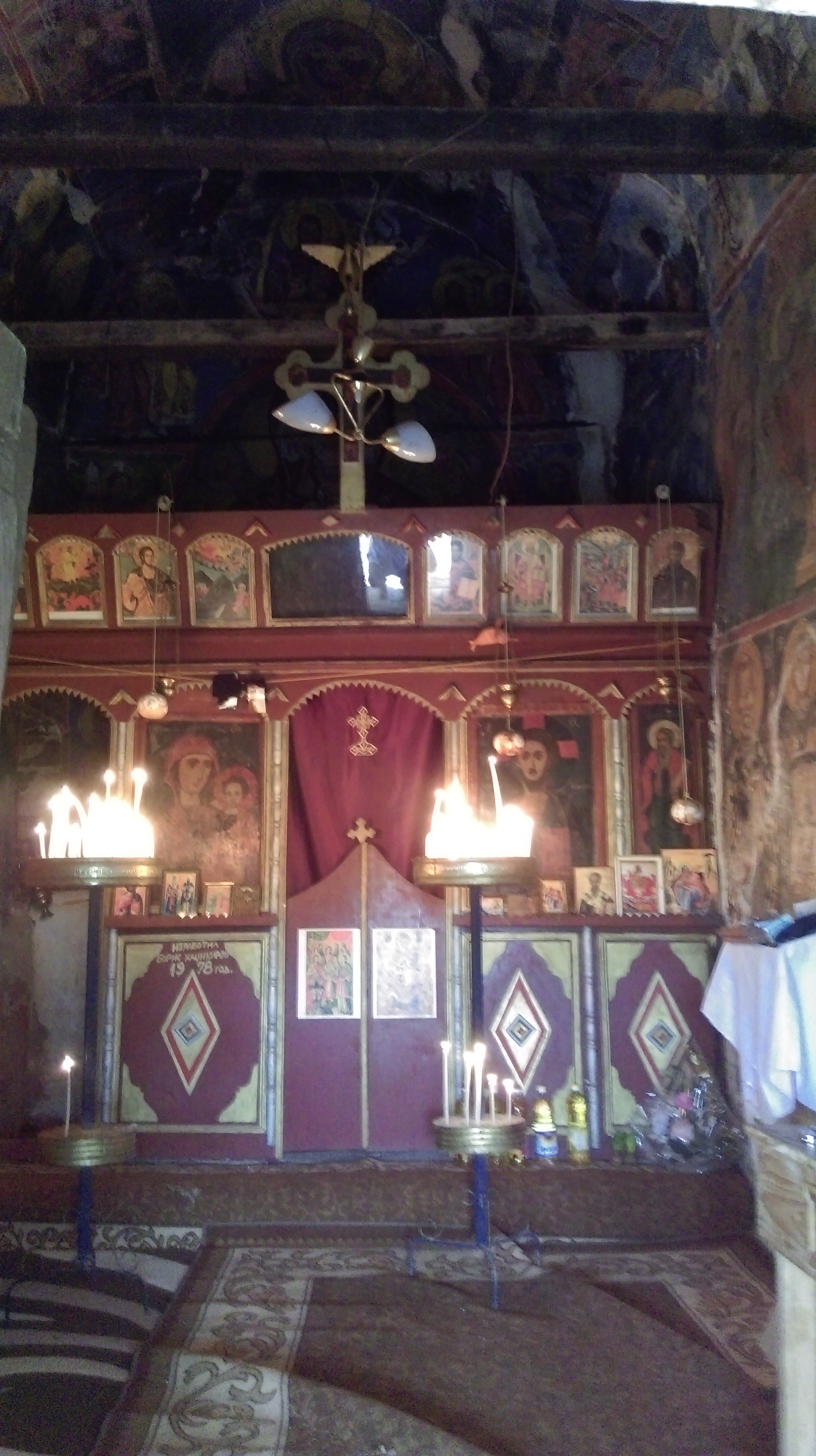
Iconostasis of St. Elijah Monastery, Grnčari

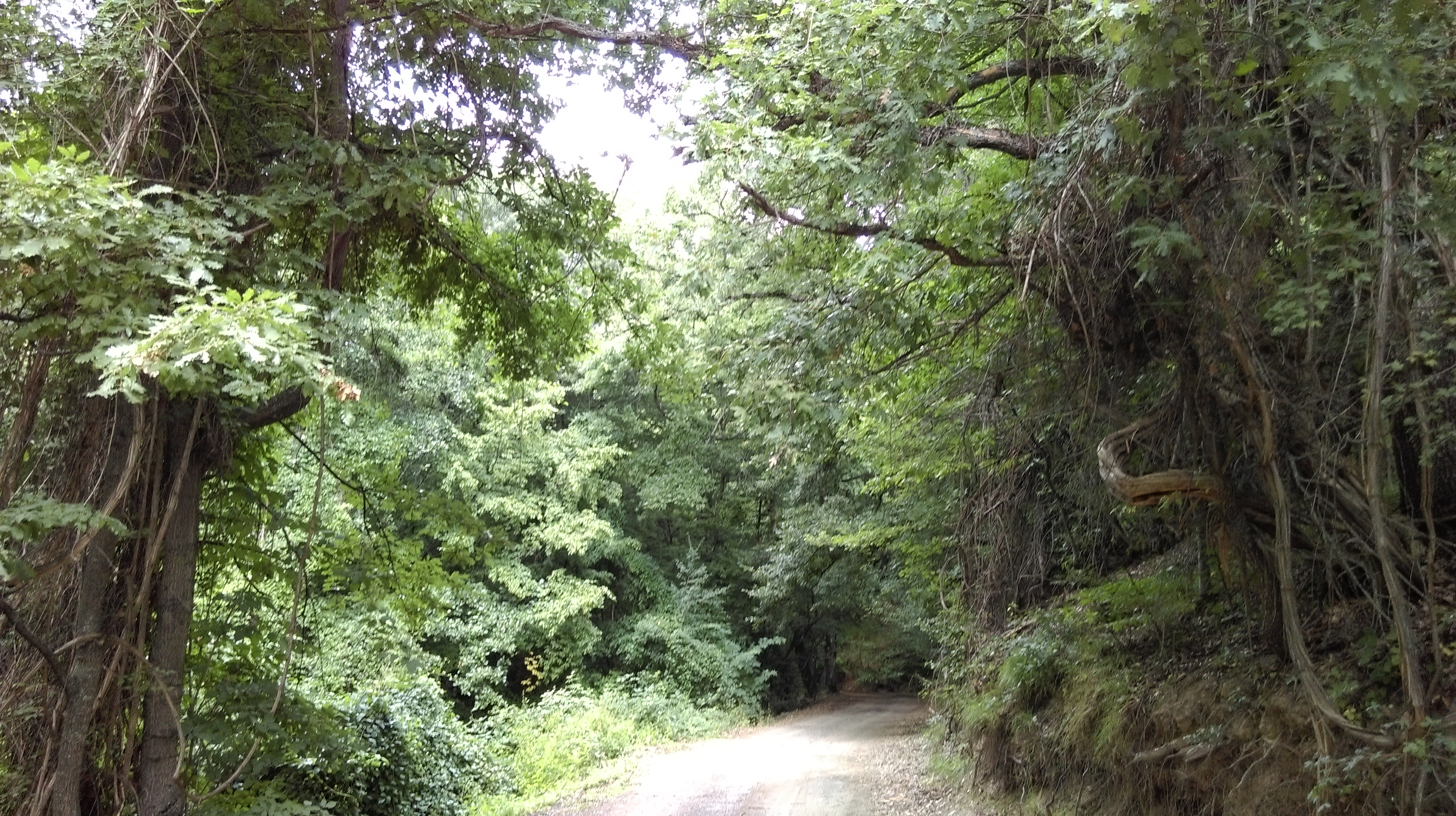
Forest of Grnčari on the slopes of the Baba mountain range

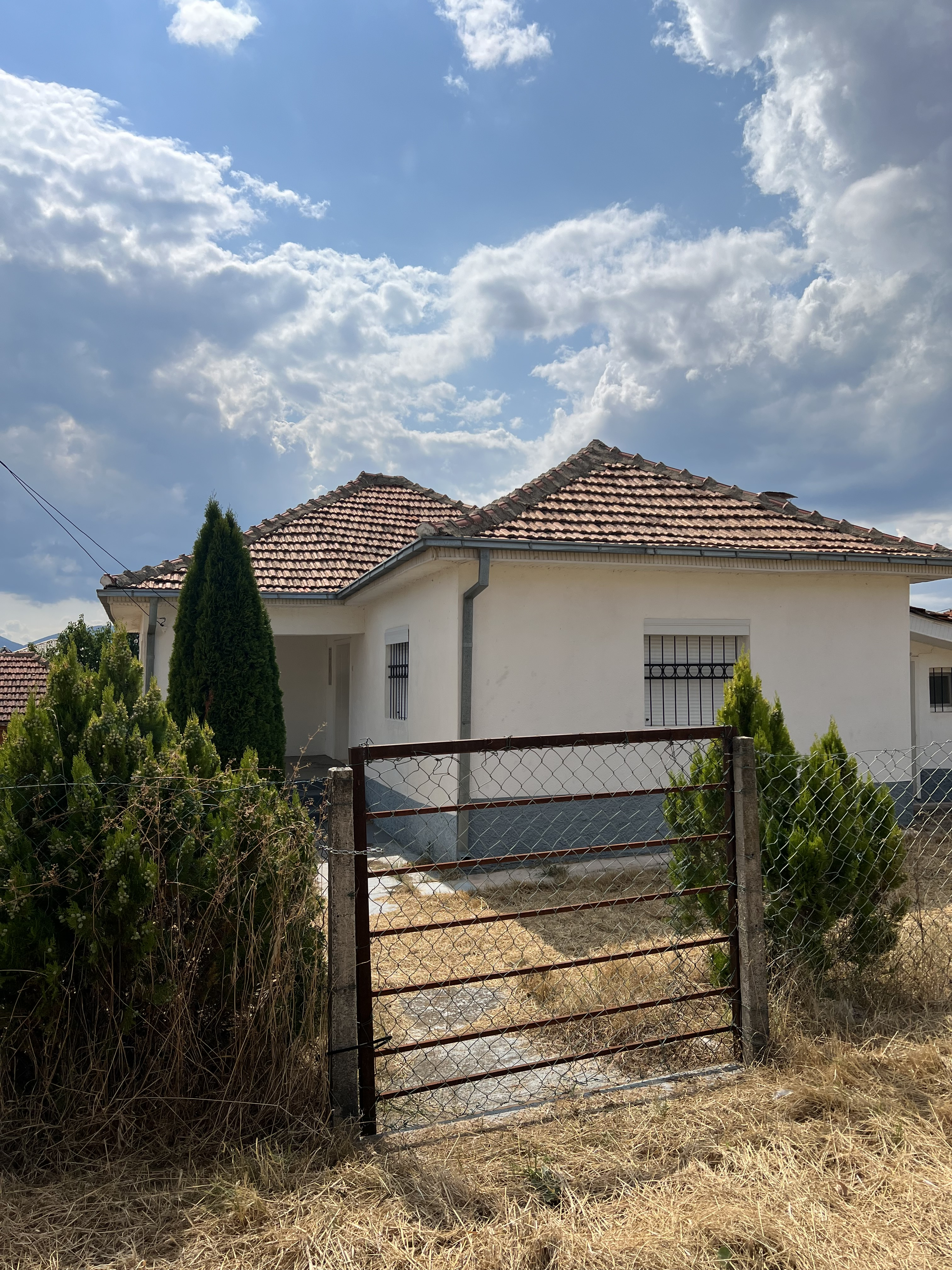
1960's Grnčari home built with local, low cost, sustainable materials.
