= KF Flamurtari Ladorisht =

Flamurtari Ladorisht
- Full name: Klubi Futbollistik Flamurtari/Фудбалски клуб Фљамуртари
- Founded: 1975; 51 years ago
- Ground: Radolišta Stadium
- Capacity: 500
- League: OFS Struga
- 2023–24: 3rd

KF Flamurtari Ladorisht (Macedonian: ФК Фљамуртари, romanized: FK Fljamurtari) is a football club based in the village of Radolišta near Struga, North Macedonia. They currently competing in the OFS Struga league.
