= KF Lirija Gërçar =

Lirija Gërçar
- Full name: Klubi Futbollistik Lirija Gërçar
- Founded: 1948; 77 years ago
- Ground: Gërçar Stadium
- Capacity: 500
- League: Macedonian Third League (Southwest)
- 2023–24: 2nd

KF Lirija Gërçar is a football club based in the village of Gërçar, Resen Municipality, North Macedonia. They are currently competing in the Macedonian Third League (Southwest Division).

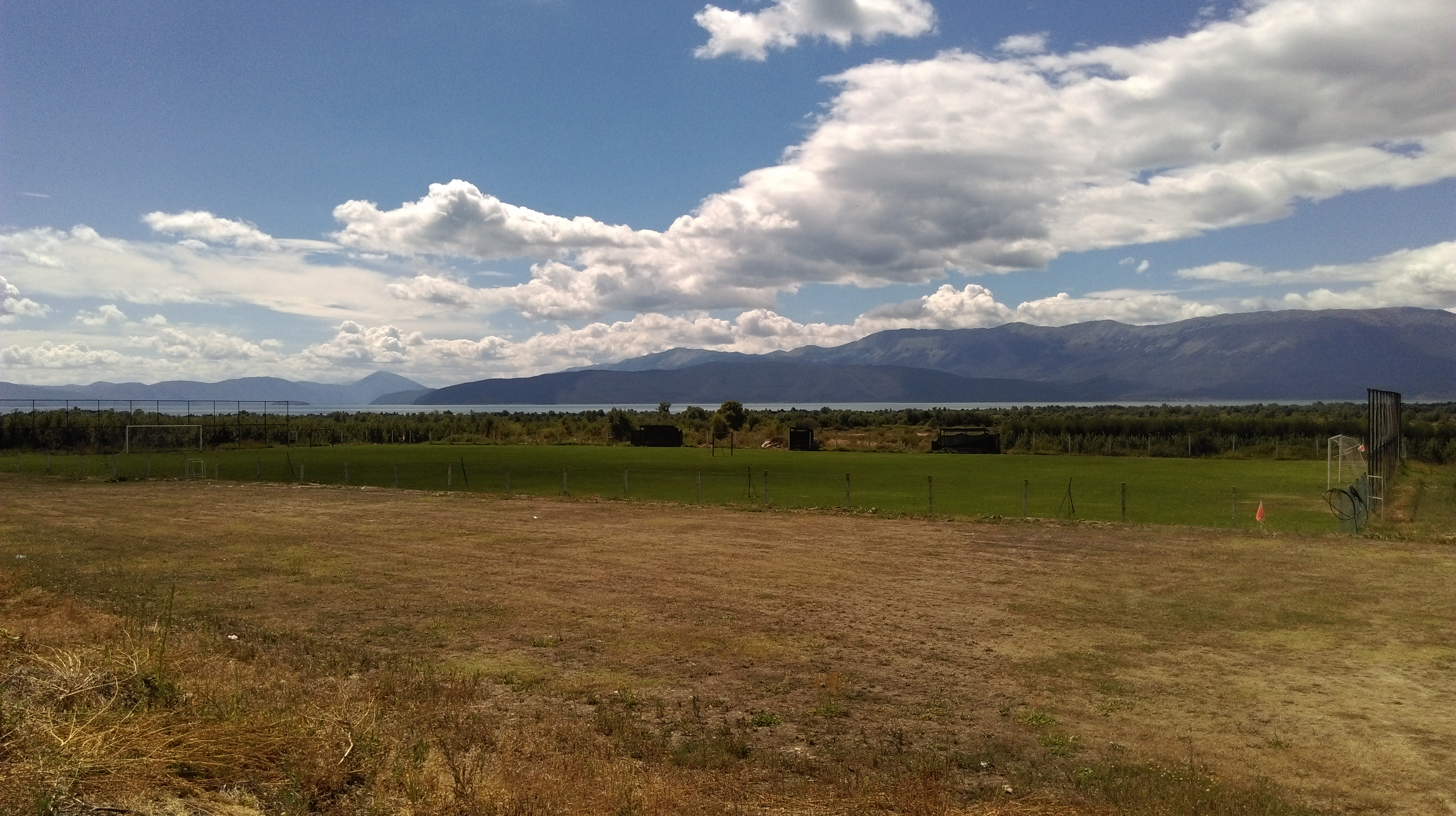
Local football ground of Grnčari football team
