= 2013–14 Macedonian Third Football League =

Macedonian Third League
- Season: 2013–14

The 2013–14 Macedonian Third Football League was the 22nd season of the third-tier football league in the Republic of Macedonia, since its establishment. It began in August 2013 and ended in May 2014.

== North ==
=== Teams ===
Club	City / Town
Bashkimi 1947	Kumanovo
Besa	Slupchane
Drachevo	Drachevo, Skopje
Fortuna	Skopje
Goblen	Kumanovo
Ilinden Skopje	Ilinden, Skopje
Kadino	Kadino
Karposh 93	Kumanovo
Radusha	Radusha
Rashtak	Rashtak
Silkrat	Kratovo
Saraj	Saraj, Skopje
Shkëndija (A)	Arachinovo
Trubarevo	Trubarevo

=== League table ===
Pos	Team	Pld	W	D	L	GF	GA	GD	Pts	Promotion or relegation
1	Goblen (C)	22	16	1	5	64	19	+45	49	Qualification to Promotion play-offs
2	Fortuna	22	14	0	8	50	33	+17	42	
3	Kadino	22	13	1	8	52	40	+12	40	
4	Besa Slupchane	22	11	2	9	44	44	0	35	
5	Drachevo	22	11	1	10	53	46	+7	34	
6	Rashtak	22	11	0	11	41	50	−9	33	
7	Shkëndija Arachinovo	22	10	2	10	31	29	+2	32	
8	Ilinden Skopje	22	10	1	11	40	39	+1	31	
9	Bashkimi 1947 (Note: Bashkimi 1947 has been deducted 3 points.) (R)	22	10	3	9	42	38	+4	30	Relegation to Macedonian Municipal Leagues
10	Karposh 93 (R)	22	9	1	12	38	53	−15	28	Relegation to Macedonian Municipal Leagues
11	Radusha (R)	22	6	2	14	24	36	−12	20	Relegation to Macedonian Municipal Leagues
12	Silkrat (R)	22	3	2	17	31	83	−52	11	Relegation to Macedonian Municipal Leagues
–	Saraj (R)	0	0	0	0	0	0	0	0	Withdraw from the league
–	Trubarevo (R)	0	0	0	0	0	0	0	0	Withdraw from the league

Source: MacedonianFootball.com
Rules for classification: 1) Points; 2) Head-to-head points; 3) Head-to-head goal difference; 4) Head-to-head away goals scored.
(C) Champions; (R) Relegated

== South ==
=== Teams ===
Club	City / Town
Babuna	Martolci
Golemo Konjari	Golemo Konjari
Ilinden 1955	Bashino Selo
Kadino KS	Kadino, Prilep
Kozhuf	Gevgelija
Mladost (K)	Krivogashtani
Mladost (U)	Udovo
Mlekar	Malo Konjari
Partizan	Obrshani
Prevalec	Veles
Rosoman 83	Rosoman
Sirkovo	Sirkovo
Tikvesh	Kavadarci
Topolchani	Topolchani
Vardar	Negotino
Varosh	Prilep

=== League table ===
Pos	Team	Pld	W	D	L	GF	GA	GD	Pts	Promotion or relegation
1	Vardar Negotino (C)	26	17	5	4	67	24	+43	56	Qualification to Promotion play-offs
2	Babuna	25	15	4	6	51	27	+24	49	
3	Varosh	26	13	6	7	38	24	+14	45	
4	Partizan Obrshani	26	12	8	6	46	29	+17	44	
5	Mlekar	26	11	11	4	36	21	+15	44	
6	Golemo Konjari	26	12	7	7	41	28	+13	43	
7	Prevalec	26	12	4	10	29	37	−8	40	
8	Mladost Udovo (R)	26	10	10	6	43	25	+18	40	Relegation to Macedonian Municipal Leagues
9	Mladost Krivogashtani (R)	26	10	3	13	47	67	−20	33	Relegation to Macedonian Municipal Leagues
10	Ilinden Bashino (R)	26	9	1	16	35	46	−11	28	Relegation to Macedonian Municipal Leagues
11	Rosoman 83 (Note: Rosoman 83 has been deducted 3 points.) (R)	26	8	4	14	37	54	−17	25	Relegation to Macedonian Municipal Leagues
12	Kadino (KS) (R)	14	6	2	6	29	36	−7	20	Withdraw from the league
13	Sirkovo (R)	26	4	3	19	24	55	−31	15	Relegation to Macedonian Municipal Leagues
14	Topolchani (R)	14	2	3	9	14	33	−19	9	Expelled from the league
15	Kozhuf (Note: Kozhuf has been deducted 3 points for fielding an ineigible player in the matches against Mlekar in the 1st, Mladost Udovo in 4th and Varosh in 6th round.) (R)	26	3	3	20	29	61	−32	9	Relegation to Macedonian Municipal Leagues
–	Tikvesh (Note: Tikvesh was expelled from the league for not showing up for the matches against Mlekar in the 6th round and Topolchani in the 7th round. The results of the team were annulled.) (D)	0	0	0	0	0	0	0	0	Withdraw from the league

Source: MacedonianFootball.com
Rules for classification: 1) Points; 2) Head-to-head points; 3) Head-to-head goal difference; 4) Head-to-head away goals scored.
(C) Champions; (D) Disqualified; (R) Relegated

== East ==
=== Teams ===
Club	City / Town
Astibo	Shtip
Babi	Shtip
Belasica	Strumica
Bregalnica Golak	Delchevo
Cheshinovo	Cheshinovo
Karbinci	Karbinci
Napredok (R)	Radovo
Osogovo	Kochani
Plačkovica	Radovish
Rabotnik (Dj)	Lozovo
Rudar	Probishtip
Sasa	Makedonska Kamenica
Sloga 1934	Vinica
Trkanja	Gradsko Baldovci

=== League table ===
Pos	Team	Pld	W	D	L	GF	GA	GD	Pts	Promotion or relegation
1	Belasica (C)	26	23	1	2	82	16	+66	70	Qualification to Promotion play-offs
2	Sloga 1934	26	19	2	5	64	32	+32	59	
3	Osogovo	26	16	3	7	63	34	+29	51	
4	Napredok Radovo	27	16	1	10	68	38	+30	49	
5	Bregalnica Golak	26	15	3	8	55	31	+24	48	
6	Plachkovica	26	13	6	7	48	41	+7	45	
7	Babi (Note: Babi has been deducted 6 points for not showing up for the cup match and interruption of the match against Plachkovica in the 9th round.)	26	14	3	9	46	33	+13	39	
8	Sasa	26	9	6	11	43	42	+1	33	
9	Rabotnik Djumajlija	26	9	3	14	43	63	−20	30	
10	Trkanja (R)	26	8	4	14	37	52	−15	28	Relegation to Macedonian Municipal Leagues
11	Cheshinovo (R)	26	8	1	17	48	72	−24	25	Relegation to Macedonian Municipal Leagues
12	Karbinci (R)	26	4	4	18	22	74	−52	16	Relegation to Macedonian Municipal Leagues
13	Astibo (R)	26	4	3	19	28	64	−36	15	Relegation to Macedonian Municipal Leagues
14	Rudar (Note: Rudar has been deducted 3 points for interruption of the match against Rabotnik Djumajlija in the 3rd round.) (R)	26	3	3	20	29	84	−55	9	Relegation to Macedonian Municipal Leagues

Source: MacedonianFootball.com
Rules for classification: 1) Points; 2) Head-to-head points; 3) Head-to-head goal difference; 4) Head-to-head away goals scored.
(C) Champions; (R) Relegated

== West ==
=== Teams ===
Club	City / Town
Arsimi	Chegrane
Bratstvo	Lisichani
Gradec	Gradec
Kamjani	Kamenjane
Kastrioti	Djepchishte
Liria (Zh)	Zhelino
Ljuboten	Tetovo
Perparimi	Rechane
Reçica	Golema Rechica
Shari-T 2012	Tearce
Shemshova 1984	Shemshevo
Shkëndija (V)	Vrutok
Vardari	Forino
Vëllazërimi	Kichevo

=== League table ===
Pos	Team	Pld	W	D	L	GF	GA	GD	Pts	Promotion or relegation
1	Vëllazërimi (C, P)	24	17	3	4	55	26	+29	54	Qualification to Promotion play-offs (Note: Vëllazërimi was lost the play-off, but due to merger with Vrapchishte was promoted.)
2	Kamjani	24	14	4	6	51	28	+23	46	
3	Vardari Forino	24	11	8	5	51	37	+14	41	
4	Bratstvo Lisichani	24	12	2	10	52	30	+22	38	
5	Reçica	24	11	4	9	42	34	+8	37	
6	Arsimi (Note: Arsimi has been deducted 3 points.)	24	11	6	7	43	42	+1	36	
7	Perparimi (Note: Perparimi has been deducted 3 points for abandoning of the match against Liria Zhelino in the 19th round.)	24	11	5	8	41	47	−6	35	
8	Liria Zhelino	24	9	7	8	50	47	+3	34	
9	Shemshova 1984	24	9	4	11	53	53	0	31	
10	Gradec	24	9	2	13	54	54	0	29	
11	Shari-T 2012 (R)	24	6	7	11	39	49	−10	25	Relegation to Macedonian Municipal Leagues
12	Shkëndija Vrutok (R)	24	6	5	13	35	63	−28	23	Relegation to Macedonian Municipal Leagues
13	Kastrioti (R)	24	1	1	22	28	87	−59	4	Relegation to Macedonian Municipal Leagues
–	Ljuboten (Note: Ljuboten was expelled from the league for fielding an ineigible player in the matches against Bratstvo in the 4th, Shemshova in 6th and Gradec in 7th round. The results of the team were annulled.) (D)	0	0	0	0	0	0	0	0	Expelled from the league

Source: MacedonianFootball.com
Rules for classification: 1) Points; 2) Head-to-head points; 3) Head-to-head goal difference; 4) Head-to-head away goals scored.
(C) Champions; (D) Disqualified; (P) Promoted; (R) Relegated

== Southwest ==
=== Teams ===
Club	City / Town
Karaorman	Struga
Korabi	Debar
Kravari	Kravari
Labunishta	Labunishta
Liria (Z)	Zagrachani
Mladost (CD)	Carev Dvor
Mogila Bi Milk	Mogila
Poeshevo	Poeshevo
Prespa	Resen
Rabotnik (B)	Bitola
Strela Sport	Mogila
Vardino	Vardino
Veleshta	Veleshta
Vlaznimi	Struga
Vranishta	Vranishta
Vulkan	Kosel

=== League table ===
Pos	Team	Pld	W	D	L	GF	GA	GD	Pts	Promotion or relegation
1	Mladost Carev Dvor (C, P)	30	23	4	3	88	25	+63	73	Qualification to Promotion play-offs
2	Prespa	30	20	5	5	97	38	+59	65	
3	Vulkan	30	19	3	8	77	44	+33	60	
4	Karaorman	30	17	2	11	84	45	+39	53	
5	Veleshta	30	17	1	12	66	55	+11	52	
6	Korabi	30	17	0	13	73	59	+14	51	
7	Vlaznimi	30	15	4	11	64	40	+24	49	
8	Liria Zagrachani	30	15	3	12	57	44	+13	48	
9	Labunishta	30	15	1	14	64	47	+17	46	
10	Kravari	30	14	1	15	57	83	−26	43	
11	Poeshevo (R)	30	11	4	15	49	78	−29	37	Relegation to Macedonian Municipal Leagues
12	Mogila	30	10	4	16	43	64	−21	34	Spared from relegation (Note: Mogila was relegated, but due to merger with Lisolaj 2010 it was stayed.)
13	Vranishta (R)	30	10	3	17	50	59	−9	33	Relegation to Macedonian Municipal Leagues
14	Vardino (R)	30	8	1	21	30	67	−37	25	Relegation to Macedonian Municipal Leagues
15	Rabotnik (R)	30	5	3	22	42	96	−54	18	Relegation to Macedonian Municipal Leagues
16	Strela Sport (R)	30	3	3	24	24	121	−97	12	Relegation to Macedonian Municipal Leagues

Source: MacedonianFootball.com
Rules for classification: 1) Points; 2) Head-to-head points; 3) Head-to-head goal difference; 4) Head-to-head away goals scored.
(C) Champions; (P) Promoted; (R) Relegated

== See also ==
- 2013–14 Macedonian Football Cup
- 2013–14 Macedonian First Football League
- 2013–14 Macedonian Second Football League
