= 2012–13 Macedonian Third Football League =

Macedonian Third League
- Season: 2012–13

The 2012–13 Macedonian Third Football League was the 21st season of the third-tier football league in the Republic of Macedonia, since its establishment. It began in August 2012 and ended in June 2013.

== North ==
=== Teams ===
Club	City / Town
Albarsa / Shkupi	Skopje
Alumina	Skopje
Bashkimi 1947	Kumanovo
Besa	Slupchane
Butel	Skopje
Drachevo	Drachevo, Skopje
FCU 55 / Goblen Junior	Kumanovo
Fortuna	Skopje
Ilinden Skopje	Ilinden, Skopje
Kadino	Kadino
Marino	Marino
Rashtak	Rashtak
Saraj	Saraj, Skopje
Shkëndija (A)	Arachinovo
Slavija	Przhino
Trubarevo	Trubarevo

=== League table ===
Pos	Team	Pld	W	D	L	GF	GA	GD	Pts	Promotion or relegation
1	Shkupi (C, P)	28	23	4	1	80	26	+54	73	Qualification to Promotion play-offs (Note: Shkupi lost the promotion play-off, but due to merger with Korzo the club was promoted.)
2	Bashkimi 1947	28	22	1	5	69	23	+46	67	
3	Saraj	28	14	2	12	57	41	+16	44	
4	Goblen Junior	28	14	2	12	51	38	+13	44	
5	Kadino	28	14	2	12	60	55	+5	44	
6	Shkëndija Arachinovo	28	14	1	13	49	46	+3	43	
7	Fortuna	28	13	2	13	47	44	+3	41	
8	Besa Slupchane	28	13	0	15	55	52	+3	39	
9	Ilinden Skopje	28	12	1	15	43	72	−29	37	
10	Alumina (R)	28	10	6	12	34	37	−3	36	Withdraw from the league
11	Rashtak (Note: Rashtak has been deducted 3 points.)	28	12	3	13	43	52	−9	36	
12	Trubarevo	28	10	5	13	38	55	−17	35	
13	Drachevo	28	9	5	14	38	53	−15	32	
14	Slavija Skopje (R)	28	7	3	18	41	60	−19	24	Relegation to Macedonian Municipal Leagues
15	Butel (Note: Butel has been deducted 3 points.) (R)	15	4	1	10	14	27	−13	10	Withdraw from the league
16	Marino (R)	15	0	2	13	11	49	−38	2	Withdraw from the league

Source: MacedonianFootball.com
Rules for classification: 1) Points; 2) Head-to-head points; 3) Head-to-head goal difference; 4) Head-to-head away goals scored.
(C) Champions; (P) Promoted; (R) Relegated

== South ==
=== Teams ===
Club	City / Town
Babuna	Martolci
Borec	Veles
Bratstvo 07	Zhitoshe
Golemo Konjari	Golemo Konjari
Ilinden 1955	Bashino Selo
Kadino KS	Kadino, Prilep
Kozhuf	Gevgelija
Mladost (K)	Krivogashtani
Mlekar	Malo Konjari
Partizan	Obrshani
Prevalec	Veles
Rosoman 83	Rosoman
Sirkovo	Sirkovo
Topolchani	Topolchani
Vardar	Negotino
Vardarski	Bogdanci

=== League table ===
Pos	Team	Pld	W	D	L	GF	GA	GD	Pts	Promotion or relegation
1	Borec (C, P)	30	24	3	3	86	18	+68	75	Qualification to Promotion play-offs
2	Babuna	30	19	4	7	82	31	+51	61	
3	Ilinden Bashino	30	18	4	8	68	32	+36	58	
4	Kozhuf (Note: Kozhuf has been deducted 3 points.)	30	17	8	5	68	25	+43	56	
5	Golemo Konjari	30	12	7	11	60	54	+6	43	
6	Vardar Negotino	30	12	4	14	50	57	−7	40	
7	Partizan Obrshani	30	11	7	12	63	77	−14	40	
8	Prevalec	30	11	6	13	57	61	−4	39	
9	Topolchani	30	12	2	16	50	66	−16	38	
10	Rosoman 83	30	12	2	16	48	62	−14	38	
11	Sirkovo	30	11	5	14	40	61	−21	38	
12	Mlekar	30	11	4	15	46	68	−22	37	
13	Kadino (KS)	30	11	4	15	66	83	−17	37	
14	Mladost Krivogashtani	30	11	3	16	29	59	−30	36	
15	Bratstvo 07 (R)	30	10	3	17	49	63	−14	33	Relegation to Macedonian Municipal Leagues
16	Vardarski (Note: Vardarski has been deducted 3 points.) (R)	30	4	2	24	36	96	−60	11	Relegation to Macedonian Municipal Leagues

Source: MacedonianFootball.com
Rules for classification: 1) Points; 2) Head-to-head points; 3) Head-to-head goal difference; 4) Head-to-head away goals scored.
(C) Champions; (P) Promoted; (R) Relegated

== East ==
=== Teams ===
Club	City / Town
1-vi Maj	Dolni Balvan
AGROS	Grdovci
Astibo	Shtip
Belasica	Strumica
Cheshinovo	Cheshinovo
Karbinci	Karbinci
Malesh	Berovo
Osogovo	Kochani
Plachkovica	Radovish
Rabotnik (Dj)	Lozovo
Rudar	Probishtip
Sasa	Makedonska Kamenica
Sloga 1934	Vinica
Tiverija	Strumica
Tri Cheshmi	Tri Cheshmi
Trkanja	Gradsko Baldovci
Vasilevo	Vasilevo
Zrnovka	Zrnovci

=== League table ===
Pos	Team	Pld	W	D	L	GF	GA	GD	Pts	Promotion or relegation
1	Tiverija (C, P)	33	29	3	1	116	15	+101	90	Qualification to Promotion play-offs
2	Vasilevo (R)	33	26	4	3	85	24	+61	82	Withdraw from the league
3	Osogovo	33	24	4	5	90	29	+61	76	
4	Belasica	33	23	3	7	102	23	+79	72	
5	Plachkovica	33	17	9	7	83	43	+40	60	
6	Cheshinovo	33	16	3	14	66	47	+19	51	
7	Sasa	33	15	4	14	76	53	+23	49	
8	Rabotnik Djumajlija	33	14	5	14	57	59	−2	47	
9	AGROS (R)	33	13	4	16	67	95	−28	43	Withdraw from the league
10	Sloga 1934	33	12	6	15	66	77	−11	42	
11	Zrnovka (R)	33	9	6	18	45	73	−28	33	Withdraw from the league
12	Rudar (Note: Rudar has been deducted 9 points.)	33	13	2	18	66	77	−11	32	
13	1-vi Maj (R)	33	9	4	20	49	74	−25	31	Withdraw from the league
14	Trkanja	33	9	3	21	34	80	−46	30	
15	Karbinci	33	6	5	22	29	97	−68	23	
16	Malesh (R)	33	5	6	22	30	91	−61	21	Relegation to Macedonian Municipal Leagues
17	Astibo (Note: Astibo has been deducted 3 points.)	33	6	3	24	41	112	−71	18	
18	Tri Cheshmi (R)	17	4	4	9	19	36	−17	16	Withdraw from the league

Source: MacedonianFootball.com
Rules for classification: 1) Points; 2) Head-to-head points; 3) Head-to-head goal difference; 4) Head-to-head away goals scored.
(C) Champions; (P) Promoted; (R) Relegated

== West ==
=== Teams ===
Club	City / Town
Arsimi	Chegrane
Bratstvo	Lisichani
Flamurtari	Debreshe
Gradec	Gradec
Kamjani	Kamenjane
Kastrioti	Djepchishte
Ljuboten	Tetovo
Perparimi	Rechane
Pirok	Pirok
Reçica	Golema Rechica
Shari-T 2012	Tearce
Shemshova 1984	Shemshevo
Vardari	Forino
Vëllazërimi	Kichevo
Zajazi	Zajas

=== League table ===
Pos	Team	Pld	W	D	L	GF	GA	GD	Pts	Promotion or relegation
1	Zajazi (C, P)	28	23	3	2	72	17	+55	72	Qualification to Promotion play-offs
2	Kamjani	28	15	4	9	64	45	+19	49	
3	Bratstvo Lisichani	28	14	4	10	59	51	+8	46	
4	Shari-T 2012	28	12	8	8	49	38	+11	44	
5	Reçica	28	14	1	13	64	58	+6	43	
6	Perparimi	28	13	3	12	57	52	+5	42	
7	Vardari Forino	28	12	5	11	63	57	+6	41	
8	Ljuboten	28	13	1	14	58	62	−4	40	
9	Vëllazërimi	28	12	3	13	74	58	+16	39	
10	Shemshova 1984	28	11	3	14	53	64	−11	36	
11	Arsimi	28	11	3	14	59	72	−13	36	
12	Kastrioti	28	10	5	13	57	65	−8	35	
13	Gradec	28	9	7	12	56	66	−10	34	
14	Pirok (R)	28	8	4	16	45	69	−24	28	Relegation to Macedonian Municipal Leagues
15	Flamurtari Debreshe (R)	28	3	6	19	33	88	−55	15	Relegation to Macedonian Municipal Leagues

Source: MacedonianFootball.com
Rules for classification: 1) Points; 2) Head-to-head points; 3) Head-to-head goal difference; 4) Head-to-head away goals scored.
(C) Champions; (P) Promoted; (R) Relegated

== Southwest ==
=== Teams ===
Club	City / Town
Karaorman	Struga
Korabi	Debar
Kravari	Kravari
Labunishta	Labunishta
Liria (Z)	Zagrachani
Mirche Acev	Makedonski Brod
Mladost (CD)	Carev Dvor
Mogila	Mogila
Pitu Guli	Kruševo
Poeshevo	Poeshevo
Prespa	Resen
Rabotnik (B)	Bitola
Vardino	Vardino
Veleshta	Veleshta
Vlaznimi	Struga
Vulkan	Kosel

=== League table ===
Pos	Team	Pld	W	D	L	GF	GA	GD	Pts	Promotion or relegation
1	Korabi (C)	29	24	0	5	85	36	+49	72	Qualification to Promotion play-offs
2	Vlaznimi	29	20	3	6	69	25	+44	63	
3	Karaorman	29	19	5	5	77	34	+43	62	
4	Prespa	29	15	1	13	56	47	+9	46	
5	Liria Zagrachani	29	13	3	13	49	52	−3	42	
6	Mladost Carev Dvor	29	11	5	13	43	54	−11	38	
7	Veleshta	29	12	1	16	67	67	0	37	
8	Labunishta	29	11	4	14	49	61	−12	37	
9	Vardino	29	9	8	12	55	56	−1	35	
10	Rabotnik	29	10	5	14	41	50	−9	35	
11	Vulkan	29	10	5	14	49	78	−29	35	
12	Poeshevo	29	10	4	15	57	66	−9	34	
13	Mogila	29	10	3	16	47	43	+4	33	
14	Kravari	29	10	2	17	44	74	−30	32	
15	Mirche Acev (R)	29	10	1	18	36	74	−38	31	Relegation to Macedonian Municipal Leagues
16	Pitu Guli (R)	15	5	2	8	15	36	−21	17	Withdraw from the league

Source: MacedonianFootball.com
Rules for classification: 1) Points; 2) Head-to-head points; 3) Head-to-head goal difference; 4) Head-to-head away goals scored.
(C) Champions; (R) Relegated

== See also ==
- 2012–13 Macedonian Football Cup
- 2012–13 Macedonian First Football League
- 2012–13 Macedonian Second Football League
