= 2015–16 Macedonian Third Football League =

Macedonian Third League
- Season: 2015–16

The 2015–16 Macedonian Third Football League was a 24th season of the third-tier football league in the Republic of Macedonia, since its establishment. It began on 29 August 2015 and ended on 22 May 2016.

== North ==
=== Teams ===
Club	City / Town
Besa-Vlazrimi	Slupchane
Fortuna	Skopje
Goblen	Kumanovo
Goce Delchev	Skopsko Pole
Ilinden Skopje	Ilinden, Skopje
Kadino	Kadino
Lepenec	Bardovci
Lokomotiva	Skopje
Madjari Solidarost	Skopje
Rashtak	Rashtak
Slavija	Przhino
Volkovo	Volkovo

=== League table ===
Pos	Team	Pld	W	D	L	GF	GA	GD	Pts	Promotion or relegation
1	Goblen Junior (C)	22	19	1	2	86	16	+70	58	Qualification to Promotion play-offs
2	Lokomotiva	22	15	2	5	68	26	+42	47	
3	Kadino	22	11	1	10	42	45	−3	34	
4	Volkovo	22	10	3	9	36	38	−2	33	
5	Fortuna	22	10	1	11	53	54	−1	31	
6	Madjari Solidarnost	22	9	3	10	36	43	−7	30	
7	Ilinden	22	9	2	11	41	41	0	29	
8	Goce Delchev	22	8	5	9	46	66	−20	29	
9	Besa-Vlazrimi	22	9	1	12	44	56	−12	28	
10	Slavija	22	9	1	12	39	58	−19	28	
11	Rashtak (R)	22	8	3	11	39	58	−19	27	Relegation to Macedonian Municipal Leagues
12	Lepenec (Note: Lepenec were deducted three points for abandoning the match against Lokomotiva in Round 2. Also were deducted three points for not showing at the match against Besa-Vlazrimi in Round 20. Later Lepenec were withdraw from the league and remaining matches were awarded to the opponents.) (R)	22	4	1	17	27	74	−47	7	Relegation to Macedonian Municipal Leagues

Source: MacedonianFootball.com
Rules for classification: 1) Points; 2) Head-to-head points; 3) Head-to-head goal difference; 4) Head-to-head away goals scored.
(C) Champions; (R) Relegated

== South ==
=== Teams ===
Club	City / Town
11 Oktomvri	Prilep
Borec	Veles
Dojransko Ezero	Nov Dojran
Golemo Konjari	Golemo Konjari
Mladost (U)^{1}	Udovo
Mlekar	Malo Konjari
Partizan	Obrshani
Pobeda	Valandovo
Prevalec	Veles
Tikvesh	Kavadarci
Vardar	Negotino
Zorbas Pobeda	Mrzenci

^{1} Mladost Udovo was replaced Crvena Zvezda Josifovo, after that team was withdraw due to financial reasons.

=== League table ===
Pos	Team	Pld	W	D	L	GF	GA	GD	Pts	Promotion or relegation
1	Vardar Negotino (C, P)	22	18	3	1	64	13	+51	57	Qualification to Promotion play-offs
2	Pobeda Valandovo	22	15	1	6	58	27	+31	46	
3	Tikvesh (P)	22	12	4	6	40	23	+17	40	Promotion to Macedonian Second League (Note: Tikvesh was promoted to the Second League on the place of Ljubanci.)
4	Prevalec	22	10	7	5	47	31	+16	37	
5	Borec	22	9	3	10	52	32	+20	30	
6	Dojransko Ezero	22	9	3	10	45	50	−5	30	
7	11 Oktomvri	22	9	2	11	29	33	−4	29	
8	Partizan Obrshani	22	8	4	10	34	50	−16	28	
9	Zorbas Pobeda	22	7	4	11	43	62	−19	25	
10	Golemo Konjari	22	7	3	12	30	59	−29	24	
11	Mladost Udovo	22	6	3	13	35	58	−23	21	
12	Mlekar (R)	22	2	3	17	15	65	−50	9	Relegation to Macedonian Municipal Leagues

Source: MacedonianFootball.com
Rules for classification: 1) Points; 2) Head-to-head points; 3) Head-to-head goal difference; 4) Head-to-head away goals scored.
(C) Champions; (P) Promoted; (R) Relegated

== East ==
=== Teams ===
Club	City / Town
Akademija Pandev	Strumica
Babi	Shtip
Belasica	Strumica
Bregalnica Golak	Delchevo
Karbinci	Karbinci
Napredok (R)	Radovo
Osogovo	Kochani
Ovche Pole	Sveti Nikole
Plachkovica	Radovish
Rabotnik (Dj)	Lozovo
Sasa	Makedonska Kamenica
Sloga 1934	Vinica

=== League table ===
Pos	Team	Pld	W	D	L	GF	GA	GD	Pts	Promotion or relegation
1	Akademija Pandev (C, P)	22	20	2	0	94	6	+88	62	Qualification to Promotion play-offs
2	Plachkovica (Note: Plachkovica were deducted two points.)	22	15	4	3	53	15	+38	47	
3	Belasica	22	12	2	8	49	27	+22	38	
4	Rabotnik Djumajlija	22	11	1	10	33	37	−4	34	
5	Ovche Pole	22	9	6	7	33	32	+1	33	
6	Napredok Radovo	22	9	3	10	47	42	+5	30	
7	Osogovo	22	8	5	9	36	33	+3	29	
8	Bregalnica Golak	22	8	4	10	28	29	−1	28	
9	Babi	20	8	1	11	26	50	−24	25	
10	Sasa	22	6	5	11	33	45	−12	23	
11	Sloga 1934	22	6	4	12	37	59	−22	22	
12	Karbinci (R)	22	1	1	20	13	107	−94	4	Relegation to Macedonian Municipal Leagues

Source: MacedonianFootball.com
Rules for classification: 1) Points; 2) Head-to-head points; 3) Head-to-head goal difference; 4) Head-to-head away goals scored.
(C) Champions; (P) Promoted; (R) Relegated

== West ==
=== Teams ===
Club	City / Town
Arsimi	Chegrane
Bratstvo	Lisichani
Drita	Bogovinje
Flamurtari (D)	Debreshe
Gradec	Gradec
Kamjani	Kamenjane
Napredok (K)	Kichevo
Reçica	Golema Rechica
Skënderbeu	Poroj
Tearca-97	Tearce
Vardari	Forino
Zajazi	Zajas

=== League table ===
Pos	Team	Pld	W	D	L	GF	GA	GD	Pts	Promotion or relegation
1	Vardari Forino (C)	21	15	3	3	53	20	+33	48	Qualification to Promotion play-offs
2	Skënderbeu	21	15	3	3	58	30	+28	48	
3	Napredok Kichevo	21	12	1	8	51	27	+24	37	
4	Arsimi	21	8	4	9	33	48	−15	28	
5	Flamurtari Debreshe	21	8	2	11	38	42	−4	26	
6	Drita (Note: Drita were deducted three points for not showing at the match against Vellazerimi 77 in the Macedonian Cup.)	21	8	5	8	39	46	−7	26	
7	Reçica	21	7	4	10	31	49	−18	25	
8	Tearca-97	21	7	3	11	31	39	−8	24	
9	Zajazi (Note: Zajazi were deducted three points for not showing at the second leg match of promotion play-offs against Euromilk Gorno Lisiche for Second League in the following season.)	21	7	5	9	46	43	+3	23	
10	Kamjani	21	7	2	12	37	40	−3	23	
11	Gradec (R)	21	7	2	12	30	54	−24	23	Relegation to Macedonian Municipal Leagues
12	Bratstvo Lisichani (Note: Bratstvo Lisichani were withdraw from the league after Round 11 due to financial reasons.) (R)	11	3	0	8	17	29	−12	9	Withdraw from the league

Source: MacedonianFootball.com
Rules for classification: 1) Points; 2) Head-to-head points; 3) Head-to-head goal difference; 4) Head-to-head away goals scored.
(C) Champions; (R) Relegated

== Southwest ==
=== Teams ===
Club	City / Town
Flamurtari (R)	Radolishta
Karaorman	Struga
Korabi	Debar
Kravari	Kravari
Labunishta	Labunishta
Liria (G)	Grnchari
Lisolaj-Mogila	Lisolaj
Novaci 2005	Novaci
Poeshevo	Poeshevo
Prespa	Resen
Veleshta	Veleshta
Vlaznimi	Struga

=== League table ===
Pos	Team	Pld	W	D	L	GF	GA	GD	Pts	Promotion or relegation
1	Novaci 2005 (Note: Novaci was lost promotion play-offs, but due to the withdrawal of Mladost Carev Dvor from the Second League the club was promoted.) (C, P)	22	13	6	3	52	16	+36	45	Qualification to Promotion play-offs
2	Veleshta (Note: Veleshta were deducted three points for not showing in the match against Kravari in Round 19.)	22	15	0	7	56	47	+9	42	
3	Flamurtari Radolishta	22	12	3	7	48	26	+22	39	
4	Labunishta (Note: Labunishta were deducted three points for not showing in the match against Flamurtari in Round 16.)	22	12	3	7	39	25	+14	36	
5	Prespa (Note: Prespa were deducted three points for not showing in the match against Veleshta in Round 20.)	22	11	2	9	49	31	+18	32	
6	Lisolaj-Mogila (Note: Lisolaj Mogila were withdraw from the league on several rounds to the end of season. The remaining matches were awarded to their opponents.) (R)	22	9	4	9	25	30	−5	31	Withdraw from the league
7	Korabi	22	10	1	11	33	48	−15	31	
8	Kravari	22	9	2	11	33	48	−15	29	
9	Karaorman	22	9	0	13	42	50	−8	27	
10	Vlaznimi	22	7	5	10	35	31	+4	26	
11	Lirija Grnchari	22	5	4	13	35	63	−28	19	
12	Poeshevo (R)	22	4	2	16	45	79	−34	14	Relegation to Macedonian Municipal Leagues

Source: MacedonianFootball.com
Rules for classification: 1) Points; 2) Head-to-head points; 3) Head-to-head goal difference; 4) Head-to-head away goals scored.
(C) Champions; (P) Promoted; (R) Relegated

== See also ==
- 2015–16 Macedonian Football Cup
- 2015–16 Macedonian First Football League
- 2015–16 Macedonian Second Football League
