= 2014–15 Macedonian Third Football League =

Macedonian Third League
- Season: 2014–15

The 2014–15 Macedonian Third Football League was the 23rd season of the third-tier football league in the Republic of Macedonia, since its establishment. It began in August 2014 and ended on 24 May 2015.

== North ==
=== Teams ===
Club	City / Town
Besa	Slupchane
Drachevo	Drachevo, Skopje
Fortuna	Skopje
Goblen	Kumanovo
Ilinden Skopje	Ilinden, Skopje
Kadino	Kadino
Ljubanci 1974	Ljubanci
Lokomotiva	Skopje
Madjari Solidarost	Skopje
Rashtak	Rashtak
Shkëndija (A)	Arachinovo
Slavija	Przhino

=== League table ===
Pos	Team	Pld	W	D	L	GF	GA	GD	Pts	Promotion or relegation
1	Ljubanci 1974 (C, P)	19	15	3	1	52	13	+39	48	Qualification to Promotion play-offs
2	Fortuna	19	12	2	5	41	23	+18	38	
3	Madjari Solidarnost	19	11	4	4	37	18	+19	37	
4	Kadino	19	9	2	8	35	37	−2	29	
5	Goblen Junior	19	9	1	9	50	27	+23	28	
6	Ilinden Skopje	19	7	2	10	26	37	−11	23	
7	Besa	19	7	1	11	30	44	−14	22	
8	Lokomotiva	19	6	1	12	26	39	−13	19	
9	Rashtak	19	5	3	11	41	62	−21	18	
10	Slavija	19	4	4	11	29	53	−24	16	
11	Drachevo (Note: Drachevo were withdraw from the league after Round 11 due to financial problems) (R)	10	3	1	6	14	28	−14	10	Withdraw from the league
12	Shkëndija Arachinovo (Note: Shkëndija were expelled from the league for not showing up for the matches against Lokomotiva in Round 1 and Besa in Round 5. The results of the team were annulled.)	0	0	0	0	0	0	0	0	Expelled from the league

Source: MacedonianFootball.com
Rules for classification: 1) Points; 2) Head-to-head points; 3) Head-to-head goal difference; 4) Head-to-head away goals scored.
(C) Champions; (P) Promoted; (R) Relegated

== South ==
=== Teams ===
Club	City / Town
11 Oktomvri	Prilep
Babuna	Martolci
Borec	Veles
Crvena Zvezda	Josifovo
Dojransko Ezero	Nov Dojran
Golemo Konjari	Golemo Konjari
Mlekar	Malo Konjari
Partizan	Obrshani
Pobeda	Prilep
Prevalec	Veles
Vardar	Negotino
Varosh	Prilep

=== League table ===
Pos	Team	Pld	W	D	L	GF	GA	GD	Pts	Promotion or relegation
1	Pobeda (C, P)	21	19	1	1	78	11	+67	58	Qualification to Promotion play-offs
2	Vardar Negotino	21	14	1	6	59	27	+32	43	
3	Prevalec	21	13	3	5	47	24	+23	42	
4	Partizan Obrshani	21	9	2	10	35	38	−3	29	
5	Borec	21	9	1	11	48	50	−2	28	
6	Golemo Konjari	21	8	3	10	33	45	−12	27	
7	Dojransko Ezero	21	7	5	9	35	52	−17	26	
8	Crvena Zvezda Josifovo (Note: Crvena Zvezda Josifovo were stayed after that season, but were withdraw at the start of the next season due to financial problems and they were replaced by Mladost Udovo.) (R)	21	8	1	12	36	50	−14	25	Withdraw from the league
9	11 Oktomvri	21	8	1	12	34	48	−14	25	
10	Mlekar	21	7	2	12	28	57	−29	23	
11	Babuna (Note: Babuna were withdraw from the league after Round 20 due to financial problems.) (R)	21	5	5	11	37	44	−7	20	Relegation to Macedonian Municipal Leagues
12	Varosh (Note: Varosh were withdraw from the league after Round 11 due to financial problems) (R)	11	0	3	8	11	33	−22	3	Withdraw from the league

Source: MacedonianFootball.com
Rules for classification: 1) Points; 2) Head-to-head points; 3) Head-to-head goal difference; 4) Head-to-head away goals scored.
(C) Champions; (P) Promoted; (R) Relegated

== East ==
=== Teams ===
Club	City / Town
14 Oktomvri 1946	Krupishte
Babi	Štip
Belasica	Strumica
Bregalnica Golak	Delchevo
Napredok (R)	Radovo
Osogovo	Kochani
Ovche Pole	Sveti Nikole
Plačkovica	Radoviš
Rabotnik (Dj)	Lozovo
Sasa	Makedonska Kamenica
Sloga 1934	Vinica
Tiverija	Strumica

=== League table ===
Pos	Team	Pld	W	D	L	GF	GA	GD	Pts	Promotion or relegation
1	Belasica (C)	22	18	3	1	66	11	+55	57	Qualification to Promotion play-offs
2	Plachkovica	22	16	5	1	64	12	+52	53	
3	Ovche Pole	22	12	4	6	60	33	+27	40	
4	Napredok Radovo	22	12	3	7	43	29	+14	39	
5	Bregalnica Golak	22	9	4	9	40	26	+14	31	
6	Osogovo	22	8	6	8	37	30	+7	30	
7	Sasa	22	8	5	9	31	33	−2	29	
8	Rabotnik Džumajlija	22	8	4	10	33	40	−7	28	
9	Babi	22	7	3	12	33	41	−8	24	
10	Sloga 1934	22	7	2	13	38	52	−14	23	
11	Tiverija (R)	22	4	5	13	24	38	−14	17	Relegation to Macedonian Municipal Leagues
12	14 Oktomvri 1946 (Note: 14 Oktomvri 1946 were deducted three points due to forging documents of the one of its players in the match against Ovche Pole in Round 6 round. Later they were deducted another three points for not showing up for the match against Ovche Pole in the Round 17.) (R)	22	1	0	21	12	135	−123	−3	Relegation to Macedonian Municipal Leagues

Source: MacedonianFootball.com
Rules for classification: 1) Points; 2) Head-to-head points; 3) Head-to-head goal difference; 4) Head-to-head away goals scored.
(C) Champions; (R) Relegated

== West ==
=== Teams ===
Club	City / Town
Arsimi	Chegrane
Bratstvo	Lisichani
Gradec	Gradec
Kamjani	Kamenjane
Liria (Zh)	Zhelino
Perparimi	Rechane
Reçica	Golema Rechica
Skënderbeu	Poroj
Shemshova 1984	Shemshevo
Vardari	Forino
Vrapchishte^{1}	Vrapchishte
Zajazi	Zajas

^{1} Vrapchishte was in the first part of season participated as Vëllazërimi.

=== League table ===
Pos	Team	Pld	W	D	L	GF	GA	GD	Pts	Promotion or relegation
1	Zajazi (C)	21	16	2	3	64	22	+42	50	Qualification to Promotion play-offs
2	Kamjani	21	14	3	4	51	20	+31	45	
3	Vardari Forino	21	10	3	8	39	35	+4	33	
4	Gradec	21	10	1	10	51	47	+4	31	
5	Reçica	21	9	3	9	37	33	+4	30	
6	Bratstvo Lisichani (Note: Bratstvo Lisichani were deducted three points.)	21	10	2	9	52	41	+11	29	
7	Skënderbeu	21	8	4	9	52	60	−8	28	
8	Arsimi (Note: Arsimi were deducted three points for interrupting of the match against Skënderbeu in Round 15.)	21	9	3	9	34	42	−8	27	
9	Liria Zhelino (R)	21	7	5	9	37	39	−2	26	Relegation to Macedonian Municipal Leagues
10	Vrapchishte (R)	21	7	2	12	33	62	−29	23	Relegation to Macedonian Municipal Leagues
11	Shemshova 1984 (Note: Šemshova 1984 were withdraw from the league after Round 20 due to financial problems. Remaining two matches were awarded to their opponents.) (R)	21	4	4	13	30	49	−19	16	Relegation to Macedonian Municipal Leagues
12	Perparimi (Note: Perparimi were withdraw from the league after Round 11 due to financial problems)	11	0	2	9	15	48	−33	2	Withdraw from the league

Source: MacedonianFootball.com
Rules for classification: 1) Points; 2) Head-to-head points; 3) Head-to-head goal difference; 4) Head-to-head away goals scored.
(C) Champions; (R) Relegated

== Southwest ==
=== Teams ===
Club	City / Town
Flamurtari	Radolishta
Karaorman	Struga
Korabi	Debar
Kravari	Kravari
Labunishta	Labunishta
Liria (Z)	Zagrachani
Lisolaj-Mogila	Lisolaj
Novaci 2005	Novaci
Prespa	Resen
Veleshta	Veleshta
Vlaznimi	Struga
Vulkan	Kosel

=== League table ===
Pos	Team	Pld	W	D	L	GF	GA	GD	Pts	Promotion or relegation
1	Veleshta (C)	22	16	3	3	48	31	+17	51	Qualification to Promotion play-offs
2	Prespa	22	14	1	7	41	25	+16	43	
3	Korabi	22	11	2	9	50	36	+14	35	
4	Lisolaj-Mogila	22	10	5	7	42	29	+13	35	
5	Novaci 2005	22	11	2	9	44	39	+5	35	
6	Labunishta	22	10	2	10	31	37	−6	32	
7	Vlaznimi	22	10	1	11	50	35	+15	31	
8	Karaorman	22	10	1	11	38	40	−2	31	
9	Flamurtari Radolishta	22	9	4	9	33	35	−2	31	
10	Kravari	22	9	3	10	27	30	−3	30	
11	Liria Zagrachani (R)	22	5	2	15	32	64	−32	17	Relegation to Macedonian Municipal Leagues
12	Vulkan (R)	22	3	2	17	25	58	−33	11	Relegation to Macedonian Municipal Leagues

Source: MacedonianFootball.com
Rules for classification: 1) Points; 2) Head-to-head points; 3) Head-to-head goal difference; 4) Head-to-head away goals scored.
(C) Champions; (R) Relegated

== See also ==
- 2014–15 Macedonian Football Cup
- 2014–15 Macedonian First Football League
- 2014–15 Macedonian Second Football League
