= 2011–12 Macedonian Third Football League =

Macedonian Third League
- Season: 2011–12

The 2011–12 Macedonian Third Football League was the 20th season of the third-tier football league in the Republic of Macedonia, since its establishment. It began in August 2011 and ended in June 2012.

== North ==
=== League table ===
Pos	Team	Pld	W	D	L	GF	GA	GD	Pts	Promotion or relegation
1	Madjari Solidarnost (C, P)	33	22	5	6	79	46	+33	71	Promotion to Macedonian Second League
2	Kadino	33	18	2	13	75	67	+8	56	
3	Fortuna	33	17	4	12	68	56	+12	55	
4	Drachevo	33	17	3	13	51	46	+5	54	
5	Albarsa	33	17	2	14	94	68	+26	53	
6	Shkëndija Arachinovo	33	17	2	14	66	54	+12	53	
7	Bashkimi 1947	33	16	4	13	72	55	+17	52	
8	Butel	33	17	1	15	52	48	+4	52	
9	Alumina	33	13	9	11	57	46	+11	48	
10	Besa Slupchane	33	15	2	16	73	67	+6	47	
11	Raštak	33	13	7	13	55	50	+5	46	
12	Marino	33	13	6	14	47	56	−9	45	
13	Ilinden	33	15	0	18	55	72	−17	45	
14	Slavija	33	13	6	14	47	64	−17	45	
15	Karposh 93 (R)	33	14	2	17	47	58	−11	44	Withdraw from the league
16	Cementarnica 55 (R)	33	11	5	17	54	64	−10	38	Relegation to Macedonian Municipal Leagues
17	Bunardjik (R)	33	4	4	25	45	109	−64	16	Relegation to Macedonian Municipal Leagues
18	Aerodrom (R)	17	4	2	11	17	28	−11	14	Withdraw from the league

Source: MacedonianFootball.com
Rules for classification: 1) Points; 2) Head-to-head points; 3) Head-to-head goal difference; 4) Head-to-head away goals scored.
(C) Champions; (P) Promoted; (R) Relegated

== South ==
=== League table ===
Pos	Team	Pld	W	D	L	GF	GA	GD	Pts	Promotion or relegation
1	Korzo (C, P)	28	23	1	4	62	20	+42	70	Promotion to Macedonian Second League
2	Kozhuf	28	21	5	2	84	18	+66	68	
3	Vardar Negotino	28	18	5	5	73	35	+38	59	
4	Ilinden Bashino	28	18	3	7	55	24	+31	57	
5	Babuna	28	16	6	6	70	26	+44	54	
6	Partizan Obrshani	28	16	0	12	55	45	+10	48	
7	Golemo Konjari	28	14	3	11	55	60	−5	45	
8	Prevalec	28	11	8	9	47	43	+4	41	
9	Crna Reka (R)	28	8	5	15	57	71	−14	29	Withdraw from the league
10	Kadino (KS)	28	7	4	17	51	89	−38	25	
11	Mladost Krivogashtani	28	7	3	18	40	57	−17	24	
12	Sirkovo	28	6	6	16	42	60	−18	24	
13	Borec	28	5	7	16	37	70	−33	22	
14	Mlekar	28	5	6	17	36	65	−29	21	
15	Birlik Veles (R)	28	3	2	23	26	107	−81	11	Relegation to Macedonian Municipal Leagues

Source: MacedonianFootball.com
Rules for classification: 1) Points; 2) Head-to-head points; 3) Head-to-head goal difference; 4) Head-to-head away goals scored.
(C) Champions; (P) Promoted; (R) Relegated

== East ==
=== League table ===
Pos	Team	Pld	W	D	L	GF	GA	GD	Pts	Promotion or relegation
1	Bregalnica Delchevo (C, R)	27	22	2	3	85	26	+59	68	Withdraw from the league
2	Babi (P)	27	21	3	3	85	28	+57	66	Promotion to Macedonian Second League
3	Plačkovica	27	20	2	5	70	27	+43	62	
4	Vasilevo	27	16	3	8	45	35	+10	51	
5	Cheshinovo	27	15	3	9	62	43	+19	48	
6	Tiverija	27	14	4	9	63	46	+17	46	
7	Rudar	27	12	6	9	63	47	+16	42	
8	Sasa	27	11	3	13	39	39	0	36	
9	Astibo (Note: Astibo has been deducted 3 points.)	27	11	1	15	39	59	−20	31	
10	Tri Cheshmi (Note: Tri Cheshmi has been deducted 3 points.)	27	10	2	15	45	59	−14	29	
11	Rabotnik Djumajlija (Note: Rabotnik Djumajlija has been deducted 3 points.)	27	8	5	14	33	51	−18	26	
12	Malesh	27	6	2	19	42	80	−38	20	
13	Zrnovka (Note: Zrnovka has been deducted 3 points.)	27	5	1	21	31	87	−56	13	
14	Karbinci (Note: Karbinci has been deducted 3 points.)	27	3	2	22	38	82	−44	8	Spared from relegation
15	Mladost Orizari (R)	14	2	1	11	19	50	−31	7	Withdraw from the league

Source: MacedonianFootball.com
Rules for classification: 1) Points; 2) Head-to-head points; 3) Head-to-head goal difference; 4) Head-to-head away goals scored.
(C) Champions; (P) Promoted; (R) Relegated

== West ==
=== League table ===
Pos	Team	Pld	W	D	L	GF	GA	GD	Pts	Promotion or relegation
1	Vrapčište (C, P)	28	20	7	1	91	42	+49	67	Promotion to Macedonian Second League
2	Reçica	28	20	3	5	73	30	+43	63	
3	Ljuboten	28	19	2	7	64	24	+40	59	
4	Gradec	28	15	4	9	61	51	+10	49	
5	Vardari Forino	28	13	5	10	70	51	+19	44	
6	Bratstvo Lisichani	28	13	4	11	58	55	+3	43	
7	Rinia Negotino (R)	27	13	1	13	54	68	−14	40	Withdraw from the league
8	Arsimi	27	10	7	10	48	48	0	37	
9	Shemshova 1984	22	10	0	12	64	55	+9	30	
10	Kastrioti	28	10	5	13	52	60	−8	35	
11	Flamurtari Debreshe	28	9	5	14	49	63	−14	32	
12	Perparimi	28	8	8	12	40	54	−14	32	
13	Zajazi	28	7	3	18	44	82	−38	24	
14	Liria Zhelino (R)	28	6	1	21	41	81	−40	19	Relegation to Macedonian Municipal Leagues
15	Sloga Zdunje (R)	25	2	3	20	18	36	−18	9	Withdraw from the league
16	Goce Delchev Drugovo (R)	15	2	2	11	20	47	−27	8	Withdraw from the league

Source: MacedonianFootball.com
Rules for classification: 1) Points; 2) Head-to-head points; 3) Head-to-head goal difference; 4) Head-to-head away goals scored.
(C) Champions; (P) Promoted; (R) Relegated

== Southwest ==
=== League table ===
Pos	Team	Pld	W	D	L	GF	GA	GD	Pts	Promotion or relegation
1	Novaci 2005 (C, P)	31	25	3	3	87	23	+64	78	Promotion to Macedonian Second League
2	Mogila	31	16	6	9	54	34	+20	54	
3	Karaorman	31	16	5	10	71	47	+24	53	
4	Vardino	31	16	3	12	70	63	+7	51	
5	Prespa (Note: Prespa has been deducted 3 points.)	31	15	7	9	57	40	+17	49	
6	Podmochani (R)	31	15	3	13	56	51	+5	48	Withdraw from the league
7	Poeševo	31	13	7	11	65	52	+13	46	
8	Vlaznimi	31	14	3	14	74	68	+6	45	
9	Kravari	31	14	3	14	57	58	−1	45	
10	Veleshta	31	13	3	15	66	69	−3	42	
11	Liria Zagrachani	31	12	4	15	56	70	−14	40	
12	Pitu Guli	31	10	7	14	51	50	+1	37	
13	Leshani	17	12	0	5	63	40	+23	36	Withdraw from the league
14	Mladost Carev Dvor	31	11	3	17	59	80	−21	36	
15	Rabotnik	31	7	5	19	31	68	−37	26	
16	Dobrushevo (R)	31	8	1	22	48	114	−66	25	Withdraw from the league
17	Talenti PP (R)	17	6	0	11	27	44	−17	18	Withdraw from the league
18	Mazatar (R)	17	3	1	13	21	42	−21	10	Withdraw from the league

Source: MacedonianFootball.com
Rules for classification: 1) Points; 2) Head-to-head points; 3) Head-to-head goal difference; 4) Head-to-head away goals scored.
(C) Champions; (P) Promoted; (R) Relegated

== See also ==
- 2011–12 Macedonian Football Cup
- 2011–12 Macedonian First Football League
- 2011–12 Macedonian Second Football League
