= FK 14 Oktomvri 1946 =

14 Oktomvri 1946
- Full name: Fudbalski klub 14 Oktomvri 1946 Krupište
- Ground: Stadion Karbinci
- League: OFS Štip
- 2014–15: Macedonian Third League (East), 12th (relegated)

FK 14 Oktomvri 1946 (Macedonian: ФК 14 Октомври 1946) is a football club based in the village of Krupište near Štip, North Macedonia. They currently play in the Macedonian Third League.
