= Gloǵi =

Gloǵi Глоѓи Gllogjë
- Village
- Location within North Macedonia
- Coordinates: 42°05′N 21°04′E
- Country: North Macedonia
- Region: Polog
- Municipality: Tearce

Population (2002)
  - Total: 1,295
- Time zone: UTC+1 (CET)
  - Summer (DST): UTC+2 (CEST)
- Car plates: TE
- Website: .

Gloǵi (Macedonian: Глоѓи, Albanian: Gllogjë) is a village in the municipality of Tearce, North Macedonia.

== Demographics ==
According to the 2002 census, the village had a total of 1,295 inhabitants. Ethnic groups in the village include:

- Albanians: 983
- Macedonians: 310
- Turks: 1
- Others: 1

In statistics gathered in 1900, the village of Gloǵi was inhabited by 210 Albanians.
