= Prvce =

Prvce Првце Përcë
- Village
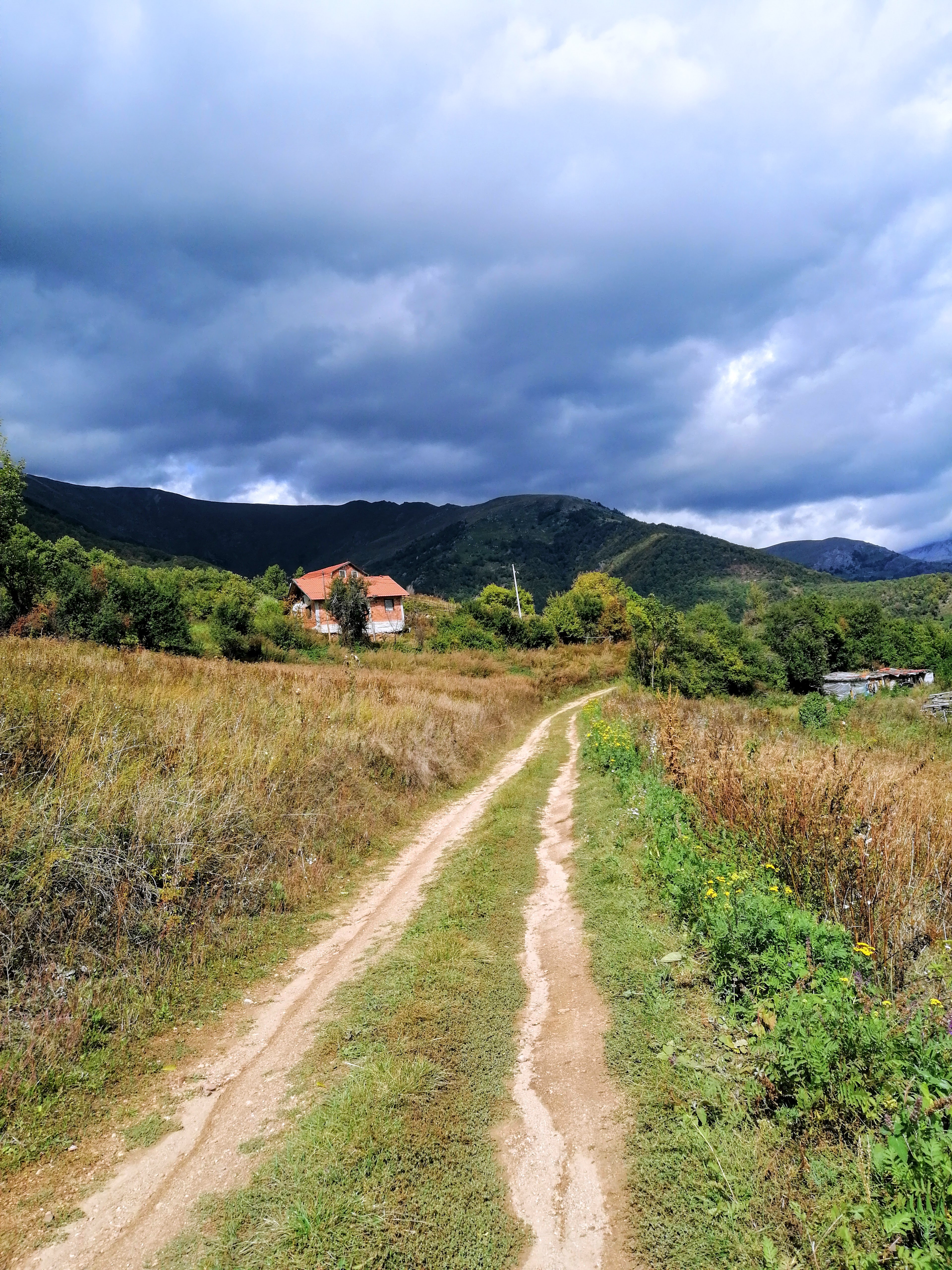
- View of the village Prvce

- Location within North Macedonia
- Coordinates: 42°08′N 21°04′E
- Country: North Macedonia
- Region: Polog
- Municipality: Tearce

Population (2021)
  - Total: 0
- Time zone: UTC+1 (CET)
  - Summer (DST): UTC+2 (CEST)
- Car plates: TE
- Website: .

Prvce (Macedonian: Првце, Albanian: Përcë) is a village in the municipality of Tearce, North Macedonia.

== Demographics ==
As of the 2021 census, Prvce had zero residents.

According to the 2002 census, the village had a total of 27 inhabitants. Ethnic groups in the village include:

- Albanians 27

In statistics gathered by Vasil Kanchov in 1900, the village of Prvce was inhabited by 70 Muslim Albanians.
