= Josifovo =

Josifovo Јосифово
- Village
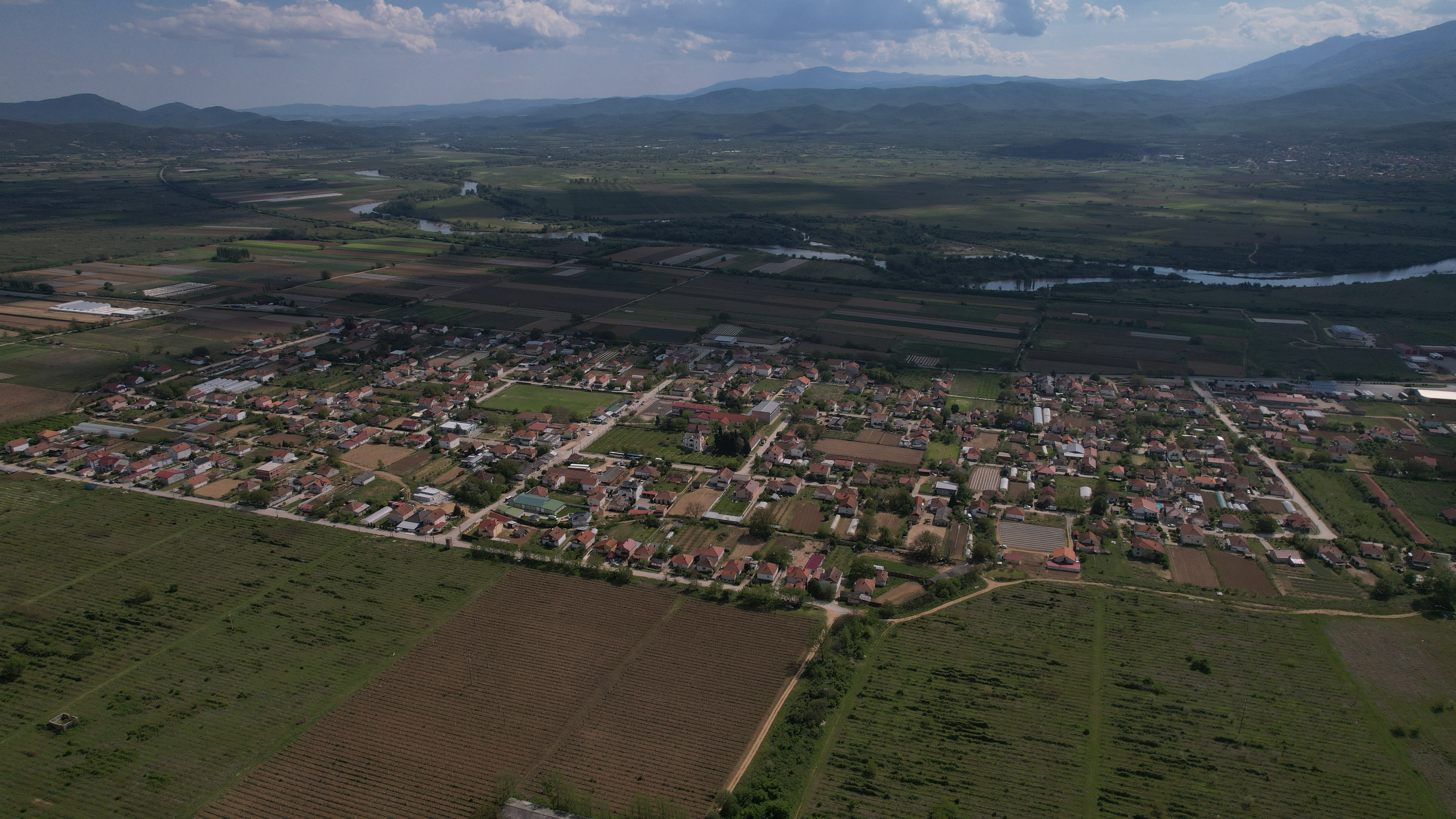
- Airview of the village

- Location within North Macedonia
- Coordinates: 41.331758°N 22.475384°E
- Country: North Macedonia
- Region: Southeastern
- Municipality: Valandovo

Population (2021)
  - Total: 1,651
- Time zone: UTC+1 (CET)
  - Summer (DST): UTC+2 (CEST)
- Website: .

Josifovo (Macedonian: Јосифово) is a village in the municipality of Valandovo, North Macedonia.

== Demographics ==
According to the 2002 census, the village had a total of 1730 inhabitants. Ethnic groups in the village include:

- Macedonians 1288
- Turks 274
- Serbs 166
- Others 2

As of 2021, the village of Josifovo has 1.651 inhabitants and the ethnic composition was the following:

- Macedonians – 1.116
- Turks _ 376
- Serbs - 97
- Romani - 3
- Albanians – 2
- others – 9
- Person without Data - 48

== Sports ==
The local football club FK Crvena Zvezda Josifovo used to play in the Macedonian Third Football League.
