= Šemševo =

Šemševo Шемшево Shemshovë
- Village
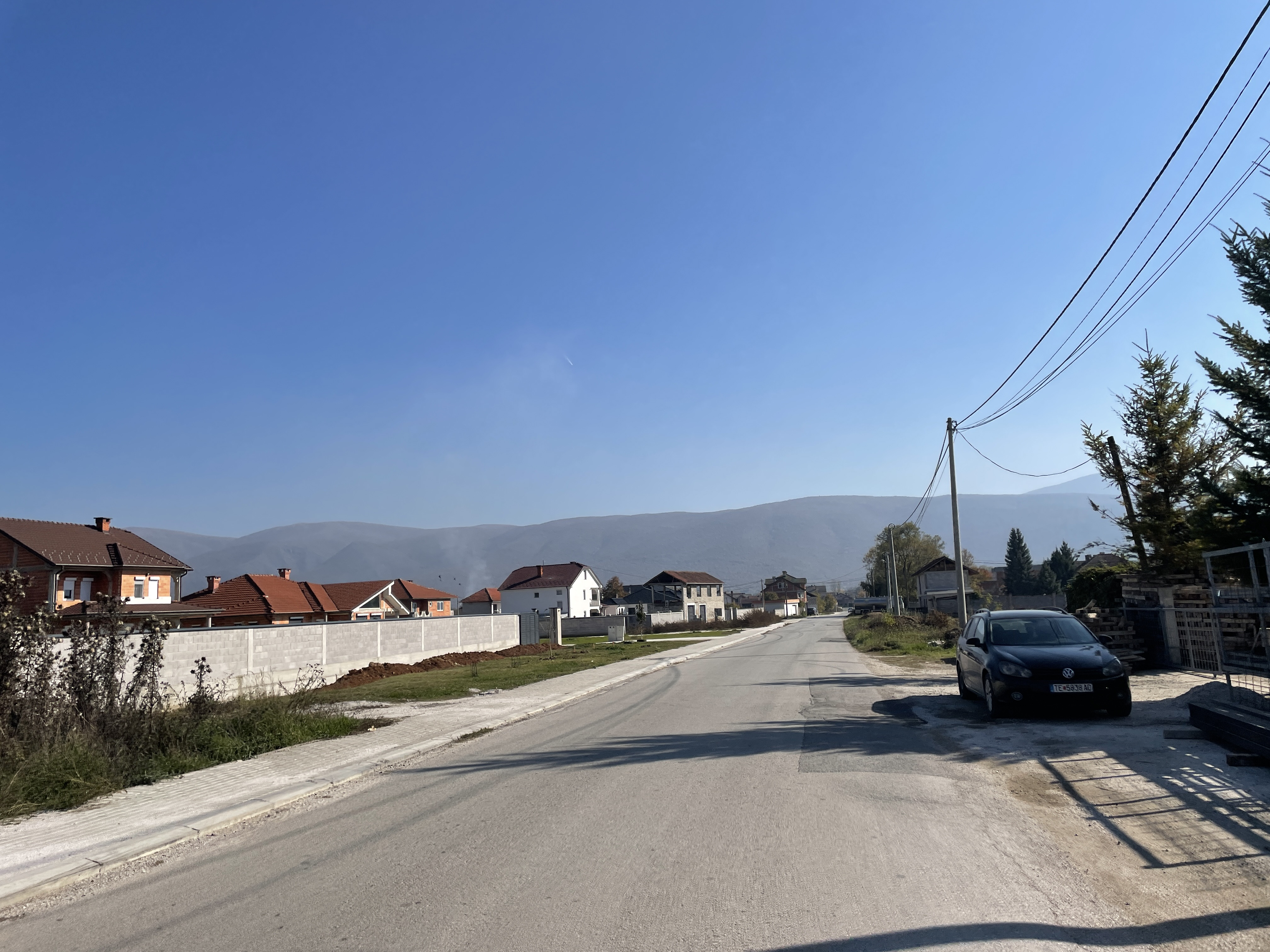
- Street in the village

- Location within North Macedonia
- Coordinates: 42°01′N 21°05′E
- Country: North Macedonia
- Region: Polog
- Municipality: Jegunovce

Population (2021)
  - Total: 1,532
- Time zone: UTC+1 (CET)
  - Summer (DST): UTC+2 (CEST)
- Car plates: TE
- Website: .

Šemševo (Macedonian: Шемшево, Albanian: Shemshovë) is a village in the municipality of Jegunovce, North Macedonia.

== Demographics ==
Šemševo is attested in the 1467/68 Ottoman tax registry (defter) for the Nahiyah of Kalkandelen. The village had a total of 45 Christian households, 3 bachelors and 7 widows.

As of the 2021 census, Šemševo had 1,532 residents with the following ethnic composition:

- Albanians 1,393
- Macedonians 116
- Persons for whom data are taken from administrative sources 22
- Others 1

According to the 2002 census, the village had a total of 1,737 inhabitants. Ethnic groups in the village include:

- Albanians 1,616
- Macedonians 35

In statistics gathered by Vasil Kanchov in 1900, the village of Šemševo was inhabited by 154 Muslim Albanians and 60 Оrthodox Bulgarians.

== Sports ==
Local football club KF Shemshova 1984 have played in the Macedonian Third League.
