= FK Goce Delčev Skopje =

Goce Delčev Skopje
- Full name: Fudbalski Klub Goce Delčev Skopje
- Founded: 1958; 67 years ago
- Ground: Stadion Kukuš
- Chairman: Gjorgji Tolev
- Manager: Jovica Ilievski
- League: OFS Gazi Baba
- 2023–24: 2nd

FK Goce Delčev Skopje (Macedonian: ФК Гоце Делчев Скопје) is a football club from Skopje, North Macedonia. They currently playing in the OFS Gazi Baba league.

== History ==
The club was founded in 1958.
