= FK Crvena Zvezda Josifovo =

Crvena Zvezda Josifovo
- Full name: Fudbalski klub Crvena Zvezda Josifovo
- Founded: 1959; 66 years ago
- Ground: Stadion Josifovo
- League: OFS Valandovo
- 2023–24: 2nd

FK Crvena Zvezda Josifovo (Macedonian: ФК Црвена Ѕвезда Јосифово) is a football club based in village of Josifovo near Valandovo, North Macedonia. They currently play in the OFS Valandovo league.

== History ==
The club was founded in 1959.
