= Lisičani =

- Village
- Лисичани
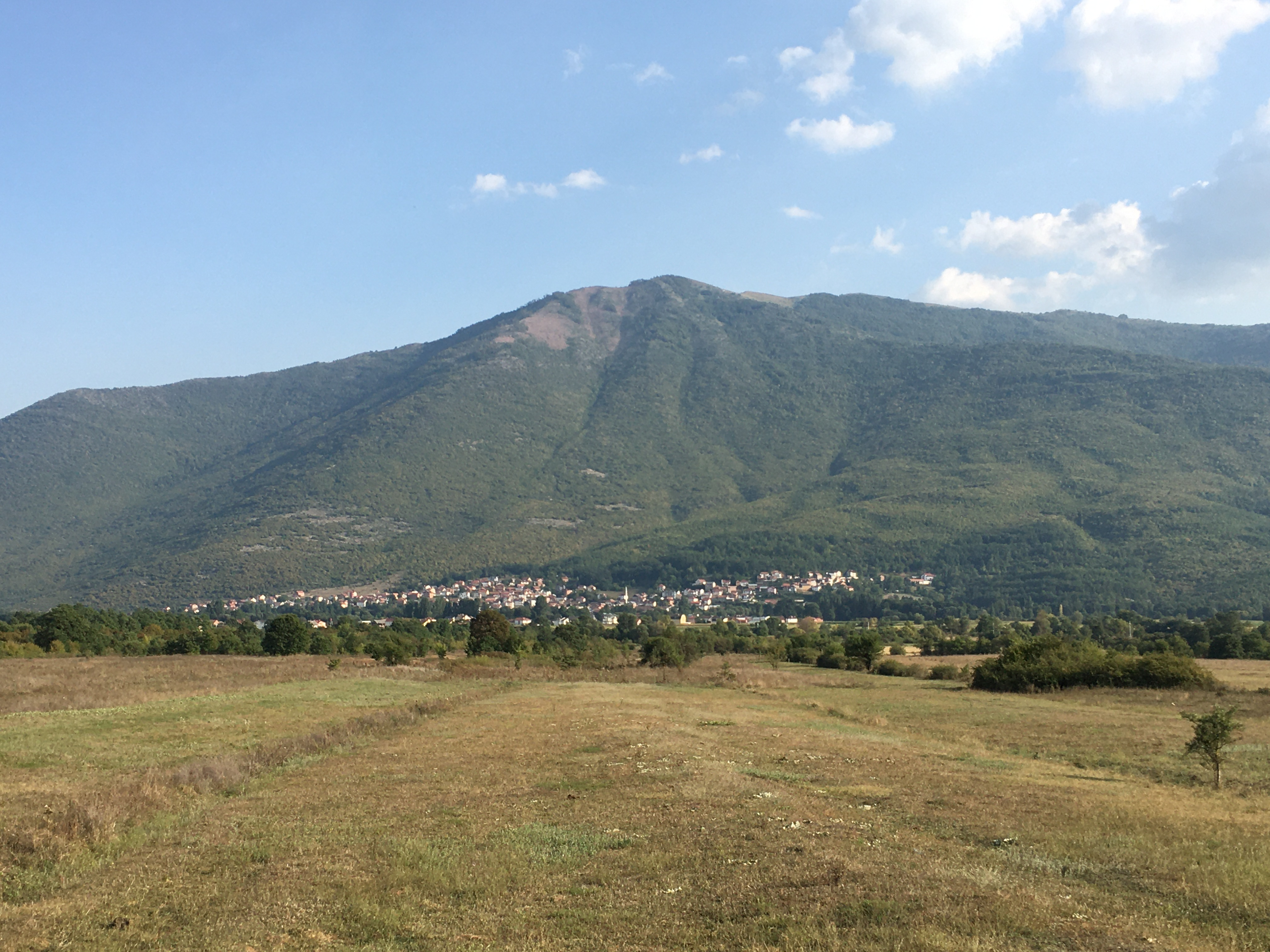

- Location within North Macedonia
- Coordinates: 41°28′N 21°03′E
- Country: North Macedonia
- Region: Southwestern
- Municipality: Plasnica

Population (2002)
  - Total: 1,153
- Time zone: UTC+1 (CET)
  - Summer (DST): UTC+2 (CEST)
- Car plates: MB
- Website: .

Lisičani (Лисичани) is a village in the municipality of Plasnica, North Macedonia.

== Demographics ==
The village is attested in the 1467/68 Ottoman tax registry (defter) for the Nahiyah of Kırçova. The village had a total of 44 houses, excluding bachelors (mucerred). Lisičani has traditionally been inhabited by a Torbeš population. According to the 2002 census, the village had a total of 1,153 inhabitants. Ethnic groups in the village include:

- Turks 1,126
- Albanians 10
- Macedonians 6
- Others 11

Based on the ethnographic work of Toma Smiljanic, provided in his Book "Кичевиа-Тома Смильаник (1926)", the Muslim Population seemed to have consisted of settlers from the northern sphere of the Kicevija and Debar, and a different share of families which he describes as "the old ones". Based on the ethnographic work of Jovan Trifunoski, the ethnic character of the Muslim population seemed to have been split between Albanian through Albanian settlers from the northern sphere of the Kicevija and Debar, whom would have later started speaking Slavic, and a different share of families which he describes as "local" Slavic-speaking Muslims.

== Sports ==
The local football team is FK Bratstvo Lisičani.
