= FK Varoš =

- Full name: Fudbalski klub Varoš Prilep
- Founded: 1939; 86 years ago
- Ground: Sportski Kompleks Mogila
- Chairman: Goran Velkoski
- Manager: Oliver Joševski
- League: OFS Prilep Division B
- 2014–15: Macedonian Third League (South), withdraw
Home colours	Away colours

FK Varoš (Macedonian: ФК Варош) is a football club based in Prilep, North Macedonia. They currently playing in the OFS Prilep Division B league.

== History ==
The club was founded in 1939.

In one time it competed in the Macedonian Second League.
