= KK Angeli =

Angeli
- Leagues: Macedonian Second League
- Founded: 2006
- Arena: Dracevo hall
- Location: Dracevo, Skopje
- Team colors: Blue, grey, red
- President: Blagoja Kečovski
- Team manager: Goran Mojsovski
- Head coach: B. Kecovski, I. Atanasov, A. Georgievski
- Website: http://kkangeli.webs.com
| Home | Away |

KK Angeli is a professional basketball club in North Macedonia (Macedonian League). It was formed in 2006 Dracevo, Skopje. There are youth competitions (generations '91 '92 '93 '94 '95 ' 97). Angeli won silver and bronze medals in the season 2007–08, and another bronze medal in the season 2008–09.

== Achievements ==
- Entering professional competing in the 3rd league
- Promoting to the Macedonian Second League
- Won two medals in 2007–08
- Won a bronze medal in 2008–09.

== Halls ==
The gym in RAJKO ZINZIFOV is where the youth players (gen. 1994 and '97) have their trainings). It doesn't have capacity for too much crowd. It doesn't have stands.

The gym in KLIMENT OHRIDSKI has new rims and is larger than the one in Rajko Zinzifov, but it does not have stands. Youth players from generations '95 and '96 train there.

THE DRACEVO HALL is a large gym in Dracevo. It has quality rims and backboards, it has original dimensions, long stands for the crowd and quality locker rooms with showers.

== Beginning and Third League competition ==
KK Angeli was formed in 2006 in Dracevo. First Angeli played in the third Macedonian league. Along with Vodnjanski Lisici, they were unstoppable, winning 90% of the games so they entered the second league.

== Second League competition ==
Angeli started poorly in the second league, losing 6 consecutive games and staying at the bottom of the table. Recently they quit the competition.

== Staff ==
President of the team-Blagoja Kečovski

Secretary-Igor Atanasov

Manager-Goran Mojsovski

Media Contact-Martin Gievski

Coaches-B.Kečovski, I.Atanasov, A.Georgievski

== Championships ==
The girl team (generation 1995 and 1996) won a silver and bronze medal in the season 2007–08. Those were the first medals since the forming of the club.

The boys from the generation '97 and '98 won the third place in the season 2008–09.

== Roster ==
(North Macedonia) Goran Gjorgev

(North Macedonia) Oliver Stojmanović

(North Macedonia) Jovanče Trajkovski

(North Macedonia) Martin Spasovski

(North Macedonia) Goran Mojsoski

(North Macedonia) Daniel Stojčeski

(North Macedonia) Viktor Petreski

(North Macedonia) Dragoslav Lihvancev

(North Macedonia) Žarko Deskoski

(North Macedonia) Almir Advić

(North Macedonia) Nermin Ramić

(North Macedonia) Nikolče Sekuloski

(North Macedonia) Samir Kozica

(North Macedonia) Martin Velkoski

(North Macedonia) Aleksandar Uzunov

(North Macedonia) Risto Janevski

(North Macedonia) Žarko Kostovski
