= FK Ilinden 1955 Bašino =

ФК Илинден 1955 FK Ilinden 1955
- Full name: Fudbalski klub Ilinden 1955
- Founded: 1955; 70 years ago
- Ground: Stadion Bašino
- Capacity: 500
- Manager: Trajče Ilioski
- League: OFS Veles
- 2023–24: 4th
Home colours	Away colours

FK Ilinden 1955 (Macedonian: ФК Илинден 1955) is a football club from the village of Bašino Selo near Veles, North Macedonia. They are currently competing in the OFS Veles league.

== History ==
The club was founded in 1955 and has a long-standing presence in regional football competitions.

== Stadium ==
FK Ilinden 1955 plays its home matches at Stadion Bašino, which has a capacity of 500 spectators.

== Recent Performance ==
In the 2023–24 season, FK Ilinden 1955 finished in 4th place in the OFS Veles league.

== Management ==
The club is currently managed by Trajče Ilioski.
