= Pirok =

- Village
- Pirok
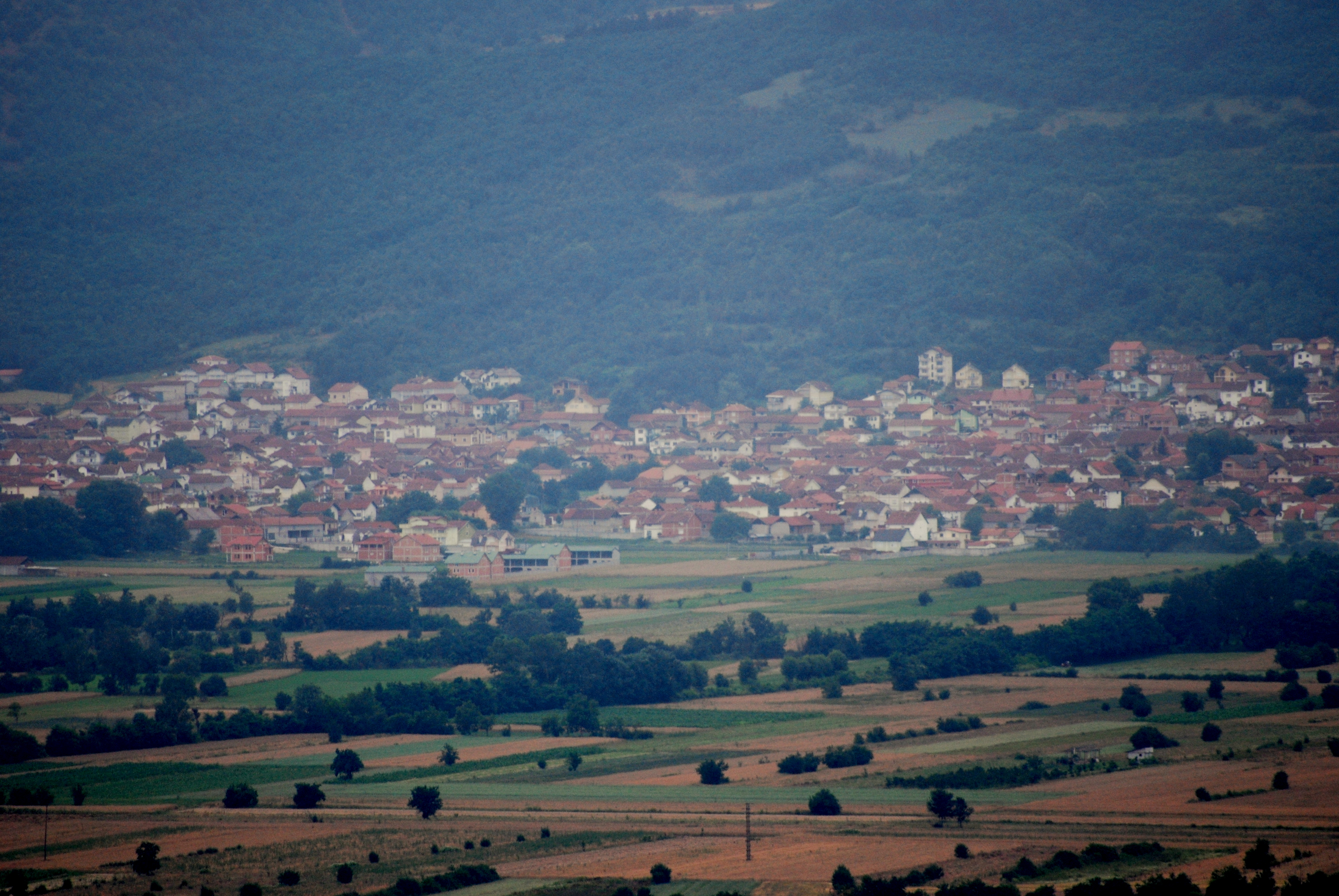
- Pirok

- Location within Macedonia
- Coordinates: 41°55′N 20°55′E
- Country: North Macedonia
- Region: Polog
- Municipality: Bogovinje

Population (2021)
  - Total: 3,963
- Time zone: UTC+1 (CET)
  - Summer (DST): UTC+2 (CEST)
- Postal code: 1214
- Area code: +389 (0)44
- Car plates: TE
- Website: .

Pirok (Albanian: Pirok) is a village in the municipality of Bogovinje, North Macedonia. It is located 13 kilometres (8.1 mi) west of Tetovo. It covers roughly 8.7 ㎢.

== Demographics ==
As of the 2021 census, Pirok had 3,963 residents with the following ethnic composition:

- Albanians 3,695
- Persons for whom data are taken from administrative sources 268

According to the 2002 census, the village had a total of 4,701 inhabitants. Ethnic groups in the village include:

- Albanians 4,701

According to the 1942 Albanian census, Pirok was inhabited by 2008 Muslim Albanians.

In statistics gathered by Vasil Kanchov in 1900, the village of Pirok was inhabited by 660 Muslim Albanians.
