= KF Saraj =

- Full name: Klubi Futbollistik Saraj
- Founded: 2011
- Ground: Stadion Ljubin
- Capacity: 500
- Chairman: Erduan demiri
- Manager: Sedat Guxha
- League: OFL Skopje

KF Saraj (Macedonian: ФК Сарај, FK Saraj) is a football club based in Saraj Municipality, North Macedonia. They are currently competing in the OFS Skopje league.

== History ==
The club was founded in 2011. It was a very successful team with many youngsters, who were hungry for success. They started playing in the Fourth Macedonian Football League and 1 year later they got promoted to the Third Macedonian League. But since 2013 KF Saraj is not existing, only the Youth Academy is active now.
