= FK Karpoš 93 =

- Full name: Fudbalski klub Karpoš 93
- Founded: 1993; 32 years ago
- Ground: Stadion Karposh
- League: OFS Kumanovo
- 2023–24: OFS Kumanovo B, 6th

FK Karpoš 93 (Macedonian: ФК Карпош 93) is a football club based in the city of Kumanovo, North Macedonia. They currently play in the OFS Kumanovo league.

== History ==
The club was founded in 1993.

Their biggest success was the playing in the Macedonian Second League in 1996–97 and 1999–2000 season.
