= FK Vulkan =

- Full name: Fudbalski Klub Vulkan Sport Kosel
- Founded: 1971; 54 years ago
- Ground: Stadion Kosel
- League: OFS Ohrid
- 2023–24: 8th

FK Vulkan Sport (Macedonian: ФК Вулкан Спорт) is a football club based in the village of Kosel near Ohrid, North Macedonia. They currently play in the OFS Ohrid league.

== History ==
The club was founded in 1971.
