= Tearce Municipality =

Municipality in Polog, North Macedonia

Coordinates: 42.07°N 21.05°E

Municipality of Tearce Општина Теарце Komuna e Tearcës
- Rural municipality
- Coat of arms

- Country: North Macedonia
- Region: Polog
- Municipal seat: Tearce

Government
  - Mayor: Daut Memishi (VLEN)

Area
  - Total: 136.54 km^{2} (52.72 sq mi)

Population
  - Total: 17,694
  - Density: 164.45/km^{2} (425.9/sq mi)
- Time zone: UTC+1 (CET)
- Postal code: 1224
- Area code: 044
- Vehicle registration: TE
- Website: Official Website

Tearce (Macedonian: Теарце [ˈtɛ.artsɛ]; Albanian:Tearcë) is a municipality in northwestern North Macedonia. Tearce is also the name of the village where the municipal seat is found. Tearce Municipality is part of the Polog Statistical Region.

== Geography ==
The municipality borders Kosovo to the north, Jegunovce Municipality to the east and south, and Tetovo Municipality to the west.

== Demographics ==
According to the 2021 North Macedonia census, this municipality has 17,694 inhabitants. Ethnic groups in the municipality:

	2002		2021	
	Number	%	Number	%
TOTAL	22,454	100	17,694	100
Albanians	18,950	84.39	14,704	83.1
Macedonians	2,739	12.2	2,114	11.95
Turks	516	2.3	382	2.16
Roma	67	0.3	50	0.28
Serbs	14	0.06	22	0.12
Bosniaks	1	0.01		
Other / Undeclared / Unknown	167	0.74	24	0.14
Persons for whom data are taken from administrative sources			398	2.25

Demographics of Tearce Municipality
Census year	Population
1994	20,797
2002	22,454
2021	17,694
