= KF Shemshova 1984 =

Shemshova 1984
- Full name: Klubi Futbollistik Shemshova 1984
- Founded: 1984; 41 years ago
- Ground: Stadion Jegunovce
- League: OFS Tetovo
- 2014–15: Macedonian Third League (West), withdrew
Home colours

KF Shemshova 1984 (Macedonian: ФК Шемшево 1984, FK Šemševo 1984) is a football club based in the village of Shemshevë, Tetovo, North Macedonia. They are currently competing in the OFS Tetovo league.

== History ==
The club was founded in 1984.
