= Dračevo, Skopje =

Dračevo Драчево
- Suburb
- Location within North Macedonia
- Coordinates: 41°56′N 21°31′E
- Country: North Macedonia
- Region: Skopje
- Municipality: Kisela Voda

Population (2002)
  - Total: 10,605
- Time zone: UTC+1 (CET)
  - Summer (DST): UTC+2 (CEST)
- Car plates: SK
- Website: .

Dračevo (Macedonian: Драчево) is a suburb in the municipality of Kisela Voda, North Macedonia. It is a suburb of Skopje and one of the first major settlements in that region and has a fully developed socio-economical life. It is located 10 km south-east from the center of the city of Skopje.

== Demographics ==
According to the 1467-68 Ottoman defter, Dračevo appears as being inhabited by mixed Slavic-Albanian Orthodox population. Some families had a mixed anthroponomy - usually a Slavic first name and an Albanian last name or last names with Albanian patronyms and Slavic suffixes.

According to the statistics of Bulgarian ethnographer Vasil Kanchov from 1900, 1,180 inhabitants lived in Dračevo, all Bulgarian Christians.

According to the Secretary of the Bulgarian Exarchate Dimitar Mišev ("La Macédoine et sa Population Chrétienne"), in 1905 there were 1,080 Bulgarians in Dračevo, labelled by him as Exarchists.

In his 1927 map of Macedonia, German explorer Leonhard Schultze-Jena shows Dračevo as Bulgarian.

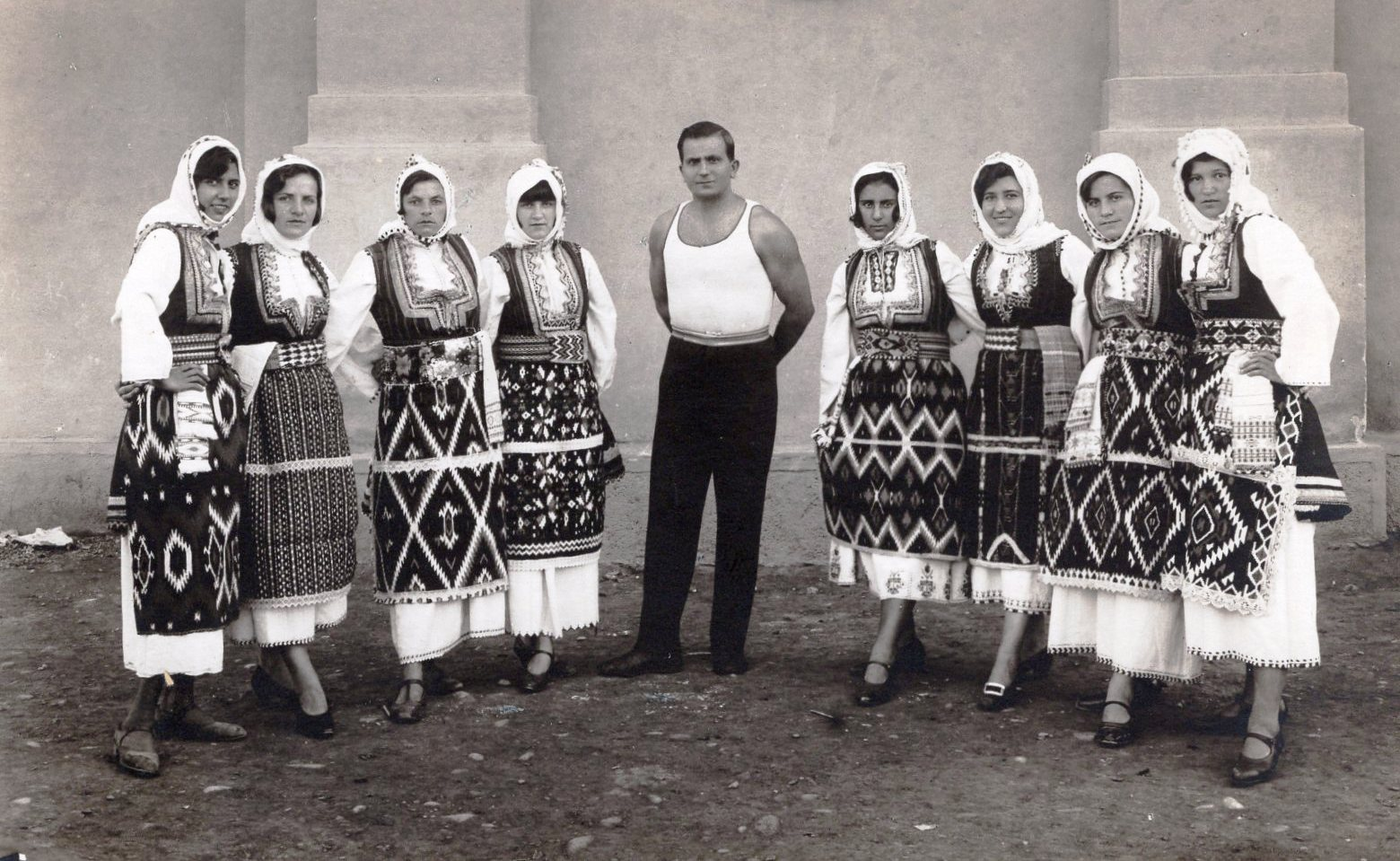
National costume of Dracevo, Skopje, 1930's

According to the 2002 census, the suburb had a total of 10,605 inhabitants. Ethnic groups in the suburb include:

- Macedonians 9,269
- Romani 276
- Turks 270
- Serbs 225
- Albanians 179
- Bosniaks 140
- Vlachs 28
- Others 218

Nearby the suburb Dračevo is the village of Dračevo, a rural extension of the settlement. According to the 2002 census, the village had a total of 8,641 inhabitants. Ethnic groups in the village include:

- Macedonians 7,741
- Romani 339
- Bosniaks 268
- Turks 106
- Serbs 64
- Albanians 22
- Vlachs 16
- Others 85

== Economy ==
The local economy is modestly developed but holds significant potential for further growth, primarily due to its proximity to Skopje, access to a railway station, close highway connections, and reliable water supply.

== Educational institutions ==
Dračevo has three primary schools: Rajko Žinzifov, Kliment Ohridski, and Kuzman Šapkarev Primary School.

== Sports ==
There are two football clubs "FK Dračevo" and "SSK" and the basketball clubs KK Angeli & KK Dracevo.

The team handball club RK Dračevo plays in the Macedonian Handball Super League for the 2011–12 season.
