= FK Napredok Radovo =

Napredok Radovo
- Full name: Fudbalski Klub Napredok Radovo
- Founded: 1980; 45 years ago
- Ground: Stadion Aleksovo
- Capacity: 1,000
- Chairman: Joce Velinov
- 2017–18: Macedonian Third League (Southeast), 4th (withdraw)
Home colours	Away colours

FK Napredok Zdravje Radovo (Macedonian: ФК Напредок Здравје Радово) is a football club based in the village of Radovo near Strumica, North Macedonia. They were recently played in the Macedonian Third League.

== History ==
The club was founded in 1980.
