= KF Tearca–97 =

Tearca–97
- Full name: Klubi Futbollistik Tearca-97
- Founded: 1997; 28 years ago
- Ground: AMS Tearce
Home colours

KF Tearca–97 (Macedonian: ФК Теарце-97, romanized: FK Tearce-97) is a football club based in the municipality of Tearce, Tetovo, North Macedonia. They recently competed in the Macedonian Third League.

== History ==
The club was founded in 1997.
