= FK Poeševo =

- Full name: Fudbalski klub Poeševo
- Founded: 1978; 47 years ago
- Ground: Stadion Poeševo
- League: OFS Bitola First Division
- 2023–24: OFS Bitola First Division, 7th
Home colours

FK Poeševo (Macedonian: ФК Поешево) is a football club based in the village of Poeševo near Bitola, North Macedonia. They currently play in the OFS Bitola First Division league.

== History ==
The club was founded in 1978.
