= KF Flamurtari Debresh =

Flamurtari Debresh
- Full name: Football Club Flamurtari Debresh
- Founded: 1977; 48 years ago
- Ground: City Stadium Gostivar
- Capacity: 1,000
- Chairman: Pajazit Seapi
- League: Macedonian Third League (West)
- 2018–19: 13th

KF Flamurtari Debresh (Macedonian: ФК Фљамуртари Дебреше, romanized: FK Fljamurtari Debreše) is a football club based in the village of Debresh near Gostivar, North Macedonia. They are currently competing in the Macedonian Third League (West Division).

== History ==
The club was founded in 1977.
