= KF Përparimi Reçan =

- Full name: Klubi Futbollistik Perparimi Reçan
- Founded: 1974; 51 years ago
- Ground: Stadion Rečane
- 2014–15: Macedonian Third League (West), withdrew
Home colours

KF Përparimi (Macedonian: ФК Перпарими, romanized: FK Perparimi) is a football club based in the village of Rečane near Gostivar, North Macedonia. They recently competed in the Macedonian Third League (West Division).

== History ==
The club was founded in 1974.
