= FK Dračevo =

- Full name: Fudbalski klub Dračevo
- Founded: 2003; 22 years ago
- Ground: Stadion Dupki
- Capacity: 500
- 2014–15: Macedonian Third League (North), withdraw

FK Dračevo (Macedonian: ФК Драчево) is a Macedonian football club based in the town Dračevo in Skopje, North Macedonia.

== History ==
The club was founded in 2003, they are recently competed in the Macedonian Third League.
