= FK Babuna =

- Full name: Fudbalski klub Babuna Martolci
- Founded: 1971; 54 years ago
- Ground: Gradski Park
- Capacity: 2,000
- Chairman: Kiro Najdovski
- Manager: Blagojche Dikovski
- League: OFS Veles
- 2023–24: 3rd

FK Babuna (Macedonian: ФК Бабуна) was a football club from village of Martolci near Veles, North Macedonia. The club currently playing in the OFS Veles league.

== History ==
The club was founded in 1971.
