= KF Liria Zagraçan =

Liria Zagraçan – Shum
- Full name: Klubi Futbollistik Liria Zagraçan – Shum
- Founded: 1979; 46 years ago
- Ground: Zagraçan Stadium
- Chairman: Fazli Šakiri
- League: OFS Struga
- 2023–24: 5th

KF Liria Zagraçan – Shum (Macedonian: ФК Лирија Заграчани – Шум, FK Lirija Zagrachani - Shum) is a football club based in the village of Zagraçan near Struga, North Macedonia. They are currently competing in the OFS Struga league.

== History ==
The club was founded in 1979.
