= Tearce =

Tearce Теарце Tearcë
- Village
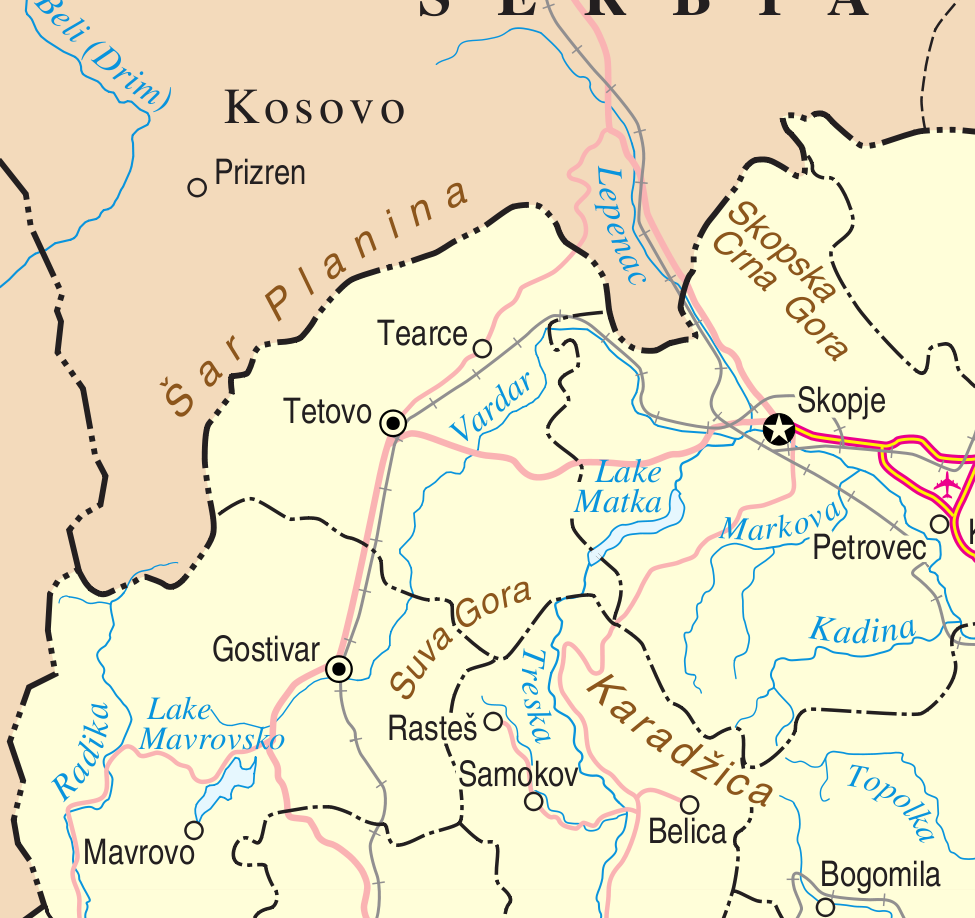
- Location in Northwestern North Macedonia.

- Location within North Macedonia
- Coordinates: 42°7′1.2″N 21°4′58.8″E
- Country: North Macedonia
- Region: Polog
- Municipality: Tearce

Population (2002)
  - Total: 3,974
- Time zone: UTC+1 (CET)
  - Summer (DST): UTC+2 (CEST)
- Vehicle registration: TE
- Website: https://www.tetovo.gov.mk .

Tearce (Macedonian: Теарце [ˈtɛ.artsɛ], Albanian: Tearcë) is a village located 12 km to the northeast of Tetovo, in northwestern North Macedonia, about 15 kilometres from the border with Kosovo. It is a seat of the Tearce municipality. Population 3,974 (2002). The B-405 road connects it to Tetovo.

== History ==
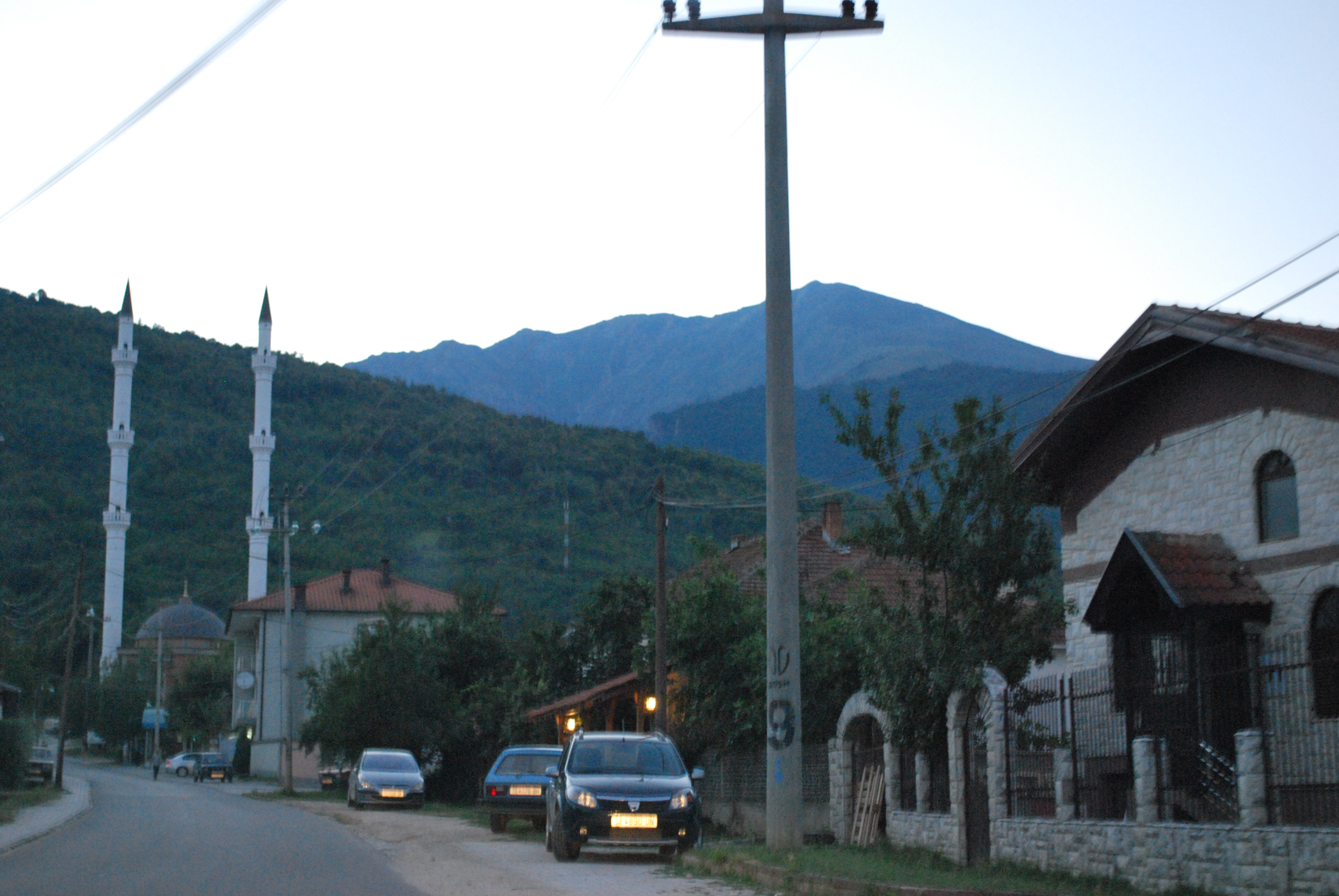
The entrance to Tearce

According to the notes of Bulgarian teacher Andrea Stoyanov collected 1866-90 and published 1891–92 in the Istanbul gazette Novini, the village of Tearce had 120 Albanian and 80 Bulgarian houses. The village had a school, a church, four stores, two blacksmiths and one tack shop. The inhabitants worked as livestock farmers, with many also working seasonally overseas. The Christians worked mainly as bakers, while Muslims worked as maltsters. According to ethnographer and revolutionary Gyorche Petrov, Tearce was a large village, which had 40 shops. Per him, the locals from the surrounding villages would go to Tearce for supplies to avoid having to go all the way to Tetovo. He described the field in Tearce as being fertile and the village as having the highest quality wheat in the region. Its surrounding forests were rich with fruit and there were 10 mills on the river which produced flour for the entire region, including a small stone bridge which connected the road to Kaçanik. He summarized Tearce as one of the richest villages in the entire Tetovo region which attracted settlers from Tetovo and the surrounding villages to settle there further increasing its growth.

According to Bulgarian ethnographer Vasil Kanchov in the year 1900 the village had a population of 600 Bulgarians and 600 Turks.

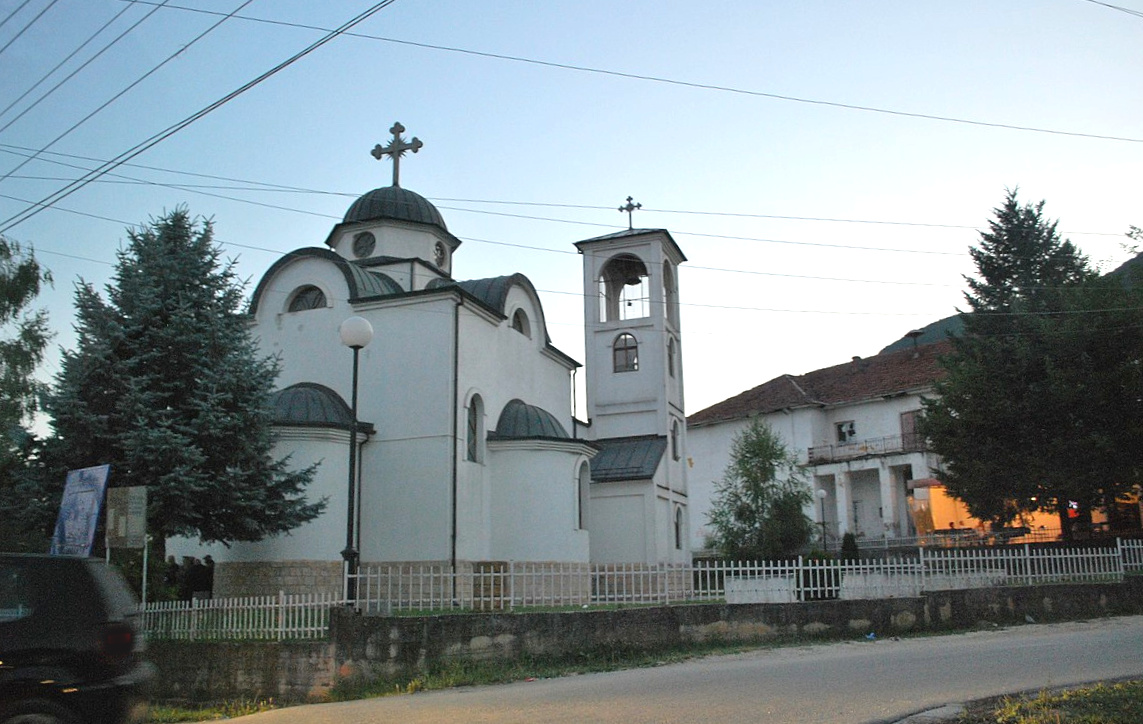
St. Demetrius church in Tearce

During World War II the village was under Bulgarian occupation when it was renamed into Peychinovo after one of its residents, the cleric, writer and enlightener Kiril Peychinovich.

A policy of Turkification of the Albanian population was employed by the Yugoslav authorities in cooperation with the Turkish government, stretching the period of 1948–1959. Starting in 1948, Turkish schools were opened in areas with large Albanian majorities, such as Tearce.

On 22 January 2001, the police station at Tearce was attacked by the National Liberation Army, killing one policeman and injuring three others, resulting in the beginning of the conflict of 2001. The village was a hotspot during the conflict.

== Demographics ==
According to the 2002 census, the village had a total of 3,974 inhabitants. Ethnic groups in the village include:

- Albanians 2,310
- Macedonians 1,085
- Turks 512
- Roma 54
- Serbs 4
- Others 9

== Sports ==
Local football club KF Tearca–97 have played in the Macedonian Third League.
