= FK Astibo =

Football club in Štip, North Macedonia

ФК Астибо FK Astibo
- Full name: Fudbalski klub Astibo Štip
- Founded: 1957; 68 years ago
- Ground: City Stadium Štip
- Capacity: 4,000
Home colours	Away colours

FK Astibo (Macedonian: ФК Астибо) is a football club from Štip, North Macedonia.

== History ==
The club was founded in 1957 and bears the ancient name of the city Štip. In its history the club has played several seasons in the Macedonian Second League.
