= FK Bratstvo Lisičani =

Bratstvo Lisičani
- Full name: Fudbalski klub Bratstvo Lisičani
- Founded: 1982; 44 years ago
- Ground: Stadion Lisičani
- Chairman: Amir Zejnoski
- Manager: Shkumbin Arslani
- League: OFS Gostivar
- 2018–19: OFS Gostivar, 6th

FK Bratstvo Lisičani (Macedonian: ФК Братство Лисичани) is a football club based in the village of Lisičani near Kičevo, North Macedonia. They currently playing in the OFS Gostivar league.

== History ==
The club was founded in 1982.
