= Kamenjane =

Kamenjane Kameњaнe Kamjan
- Village
- Location within North Macedonia
- Coordinates: 41°57′N 20°56′E
- Country: North Macedonia
- Region: Polog
- Municipality: Bogovinje

Population (2021)
  - Total: 3,654
- Time zone: UTC+1 (CET)
  - Summer (DST): UTC+2 (CEST)
- Postal code: 1221
- Car plates: TE
- Website: .

Kamenjane (Macedonian: Kameњaнe, Albanian: Kamjan) is a village in the municipality of Bogovinje, North Macedonia. It is located about seven kilometres west of Tetovo. The name (Kamenyane - English spelling) means stoneville in English. Kamenjane used to be the seat of a separate municipality that bore its name before it was merged with that of Bogovinje in 2004.

== History ==
Kamenjane is attested in the 1467/68 Ottoman tax registry (defter) for the Nahiyah of Kalkandelen. The village had a total of 55 Christian households, 3 bachelors and 5 widows.

According to the 1467-68 Ottoman defter, Kamenjane exhibits mixed predominantly Orthodox Christian Slavic and minority Albanian anthroponyms.

== Demographics ==
As of the 2021 census, Kamenjane had 3,654 residents with the following ethnic composition:

- Albanians 3,385
- Persons for whom data are taken from administrative sources 265
- Bosniaks 3
- Macedonians 2
- Others 1

According to the 2002 census, the village had a total of 4,834 inhabitants. Ethnic groups in the village include:

- Albanians 4,825
- Bosniaks 1
- Others 8

According to the 1942 Albanian census, Kamenjane was inhabited by 1670 Muslim Albanians.

In statistics gathered by Vasil Kanchov in 1900, the village of Kamenjane was inhabited by 630 Muslim Albanians.

== Sports ==
The local football club, KF Kamjani, plays in the Macedonian Second League.
