= KF Goblen =

- Full name: Klubi Futbollistik Goblen
- Founded: 2011; 14 years ago
- Ground: Gradski stadion Kumanovo
- Capacity: 7,000
- Chairman: Mair Kjaili
- Manager: Florim Imeri
- 2018–19: Second League (West), 10th (relegated)
Home colours	Away colours

KF Goblen (Macedonian: ФК Гоблен) is a football club based in Kumanovo, North Macedonia. They were recently competing in the Macedonian Second League (West Division).

== History ==
The club was founded in 2012.
