= FK Raštak =

- Full name: Fudbalski klub Raštak
- Founded: 1959; 66 years ago
- Ground: Stadion Raštak
- Chairman: Milosh Spasovski
- League: OFS Gazi Baba
- 2023–24: Third League (North), 12th (relegated)

FK Raštak (Macedonian: ФК Раштак) is a football club based in the village of Raštak near Skopje, North Macedonia. They currently play in the OFS Gazi Baba league.

== History ==
The club was founded in 1959.
