= Lozovo =

Lozovo Лозово (Macedonian) Cumali (Turkish)
- Village
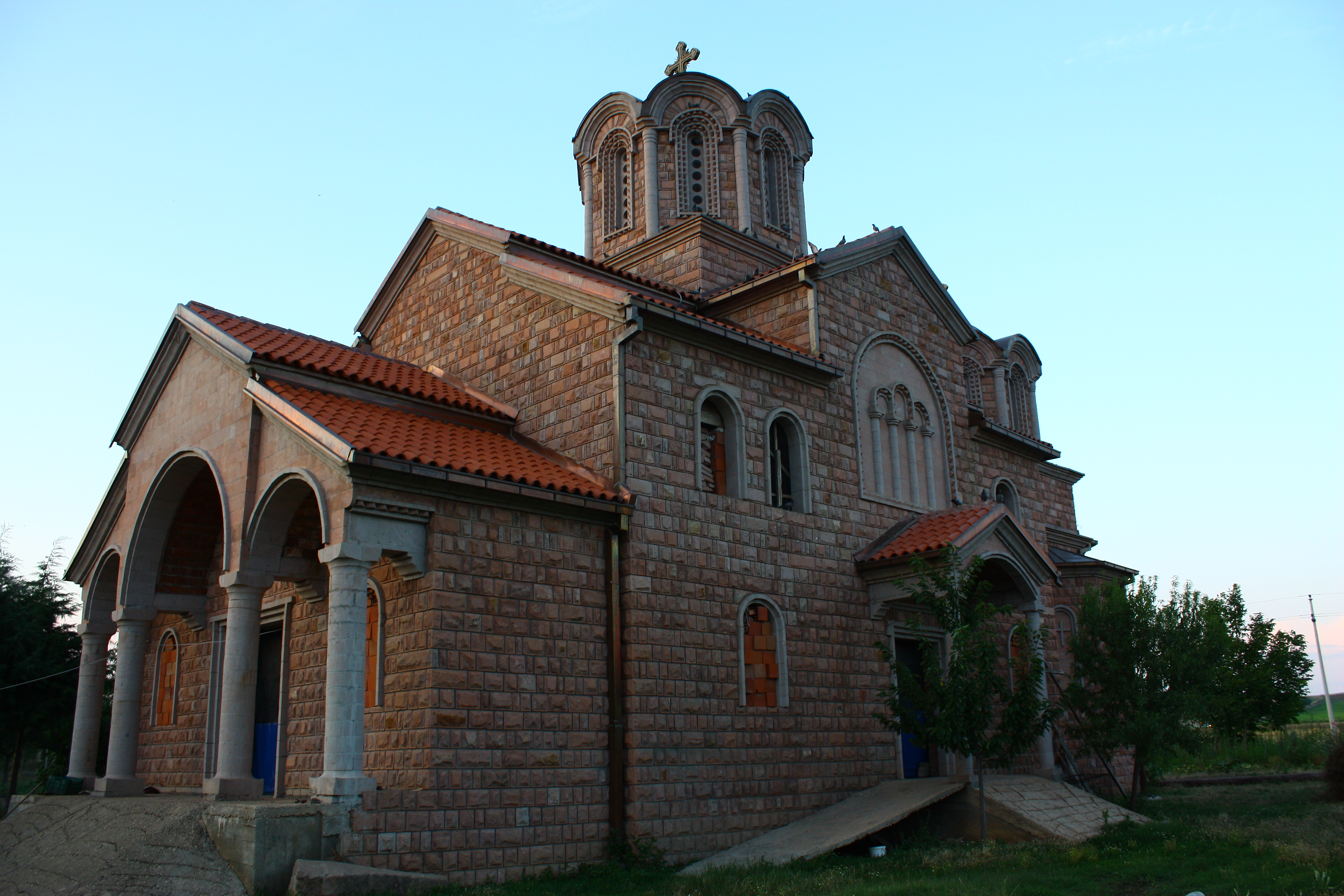
- Saint Petka Church

- Location within North Macedonia
- Country: North Macedonia
- Region: Vardar
- Municipality: Lozovo

Population (2002)
  - Total: 896
- Time zone: UTC+1 (CET)
  - Summer (DST): UTC+2 (CEST)
- Vehicle registration: SN
- Website: .

Lozovo (Macedonian: Лозово) is a village in North Macedonia. It is the seat of the Municipality of Lozovo.

== Geography ==
Lozovo is a village located in central North Macedonia, on the Ovče Pole plains. It is the eponymous seat of the Lozovo Municipality. Situated between Veles to the west, Sveti Nikole to the north and Štip to the east, the village's coordinates are approximately 41.78 ° N, 21.90 ° E.

== History ==
At the end of the 19th century, when the region was part of the Ottoman Empire, the village was part of the Kaza of Štip. At that time, Lozovo was known as Džumajlija. According to data from Bulgarian historian and ethnographer Vasil Kanchov, 150 Turks were living in the village. Both Leonhard Schultze-Jena and Dimitar Gadžanov marked Lozovo as a Turkish village.

== Economy ==
=== Small Enterprises ===
Lozovo has numerous small businesses in town. These include 4 small markets/shops, a boutique, two hardware stores, a small dentistry / primary care office, and a post office. Lozovo also boasts two restaurants situated on the highway – a motel and Restaurant Voz. Each Thursday in the morning, Lozovo hosts a bazaar near the center of town, close to the train stop. Locals and traveling vendors sell produce and miscellaneous items (including clothing, toys, kitchenware, hardware, etc.).

=== Agriculture ===
The main crops of Lozovo primarily include grapes, tobacco, and some wheat. The red and white grapes are harvested for the production of wine and for eating. Tobacco is harvested in through the autumn months, is threaded/stitched, dried, and sold in March. Many locals have replaced vineyards with tobacco fields because tobacco has become more profitable than grapes.

Domestically, locals grow vegetables and fruits in their home gardens. Vegetables can include peppers, cabbage, leeks, tomatoes, beans, carrots, and squash. Fruit can include apples, pears, plums, figs, quince, and lemons. Throughout North Macedonia, Lozovo is known for growing the most delicious watermelons.

=== Husbandry ===
Many locals have chickens, goats, and pigs. A few locals make their living as shepherds. Local goat walks occur daily through the main street.

== Infrastructure ==
=== Railway ===
The train stops daily in Lozovo (the stop is known as Orce). The train connects Lozovo to Veles, Skopje and other cities to the west, and to Sveti Nikole, Štip and Kočani to the east.

=== Roads ===
The main road through town is called Marshal Tito. Lozovo straddles the M-5 regional road.

== Demography ==
According to the last official census of Macedonia (2002), Lozovo had 896 inhabitants. The table below shows the nationalities of the citizens during the official censuses.

Year	Macedonians	Albanians	Turks	Roma	Aromani	Serbians	Bosnian	Other Nationalities	Total
1948	—	—	—	—	—	—	—	—	521
1953	30	—	571	16	—	—	—	8	625
1961	520	3	13	—	—	7	—	27	570
1971	695	—	10	—	...	8	—	56	766
1981	871	—	4	—	36	15	—	33	959
1991	874	—	5	—	40	13	—	11	943
1994	889	—	5	—	39	6	—	7	946
2002	851	—	8	—	26	—	—	6	896

== Culture ==
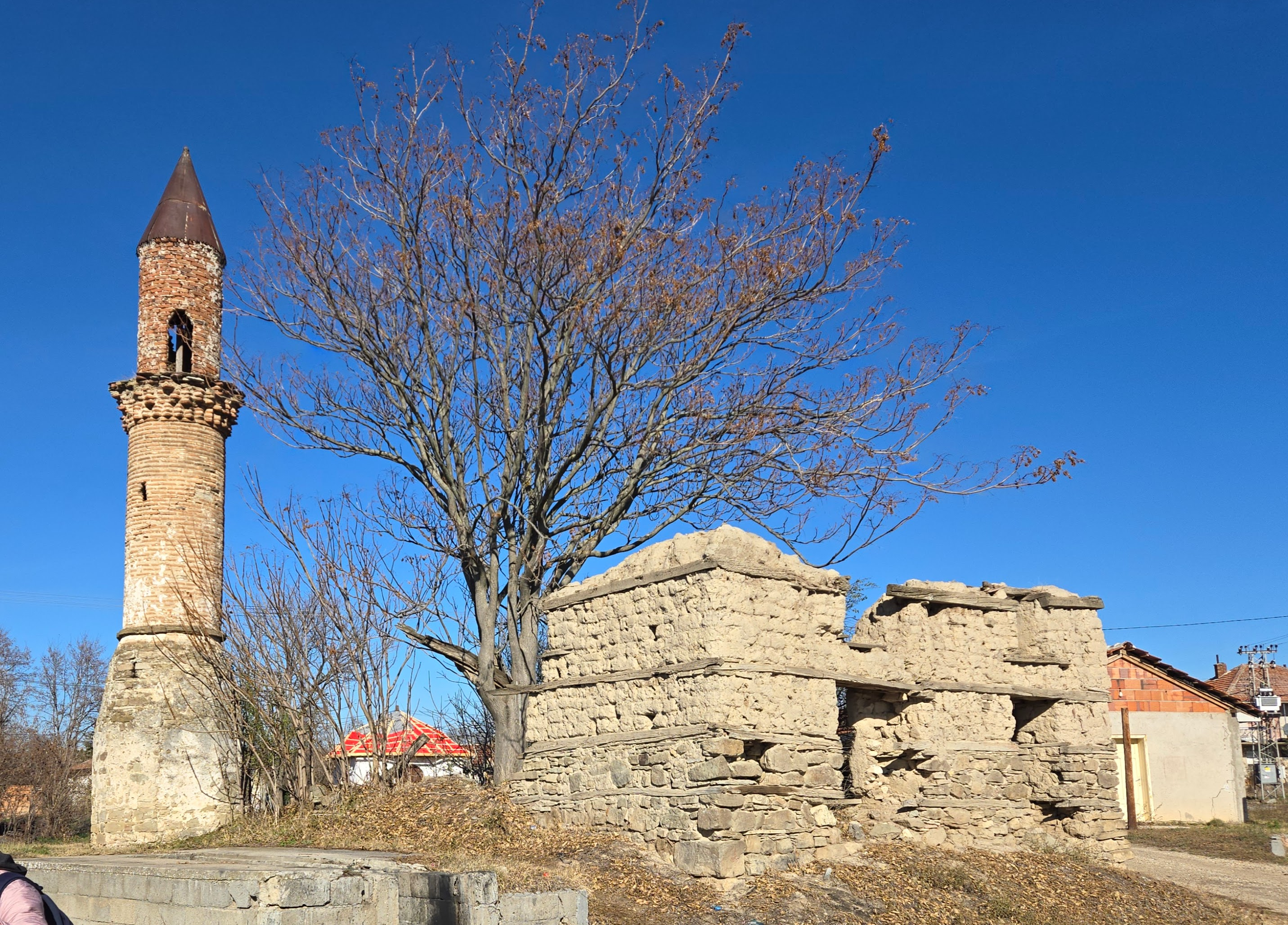
Ruins of the mosque in Lozovo, North Macedonia.

Lozovo hosts its saint's day, on October 27, where it celebrates its patron saint, Saint Petka, with music, dancing, and food at the grounds of its church. The saint's day draws hundreds of people from the surrounding areas.

=== Landmarks ===
At the center of town is a Turkish minaret and the remnants of a mosque.

A beautiful church, built recently, stands near the regional road.

The Ovče Pole radio tower, located west of the village, serves as the primary transmitter of the Macedonian Radio and Television's radio programs at 810 kHz.

== Sports ==
Local football club FK Rabotnik Džumajlija have played in the Macedonian Third League.

== Gallery ==
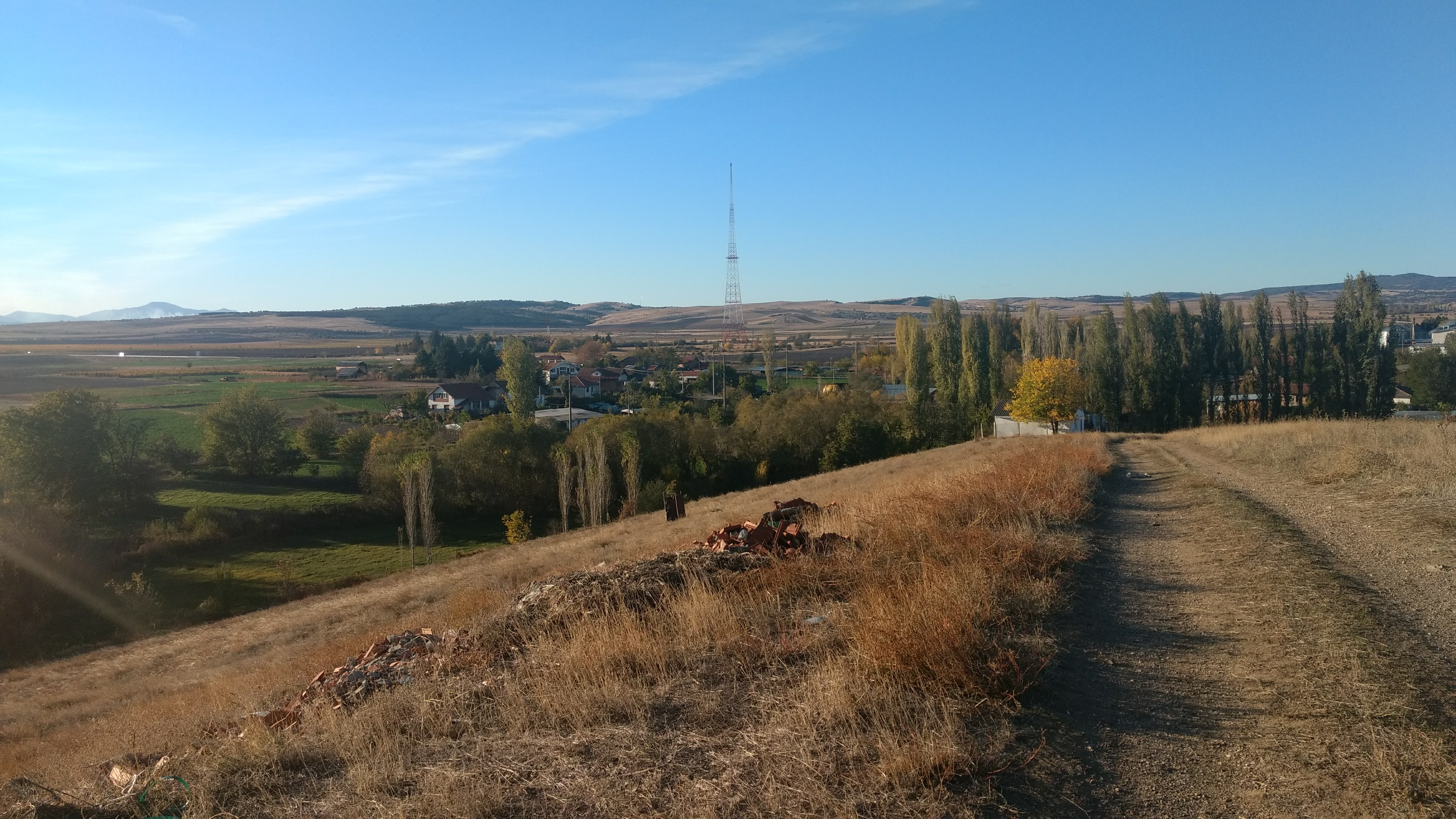
View of Lozovo to the west, with a view of the antenna.

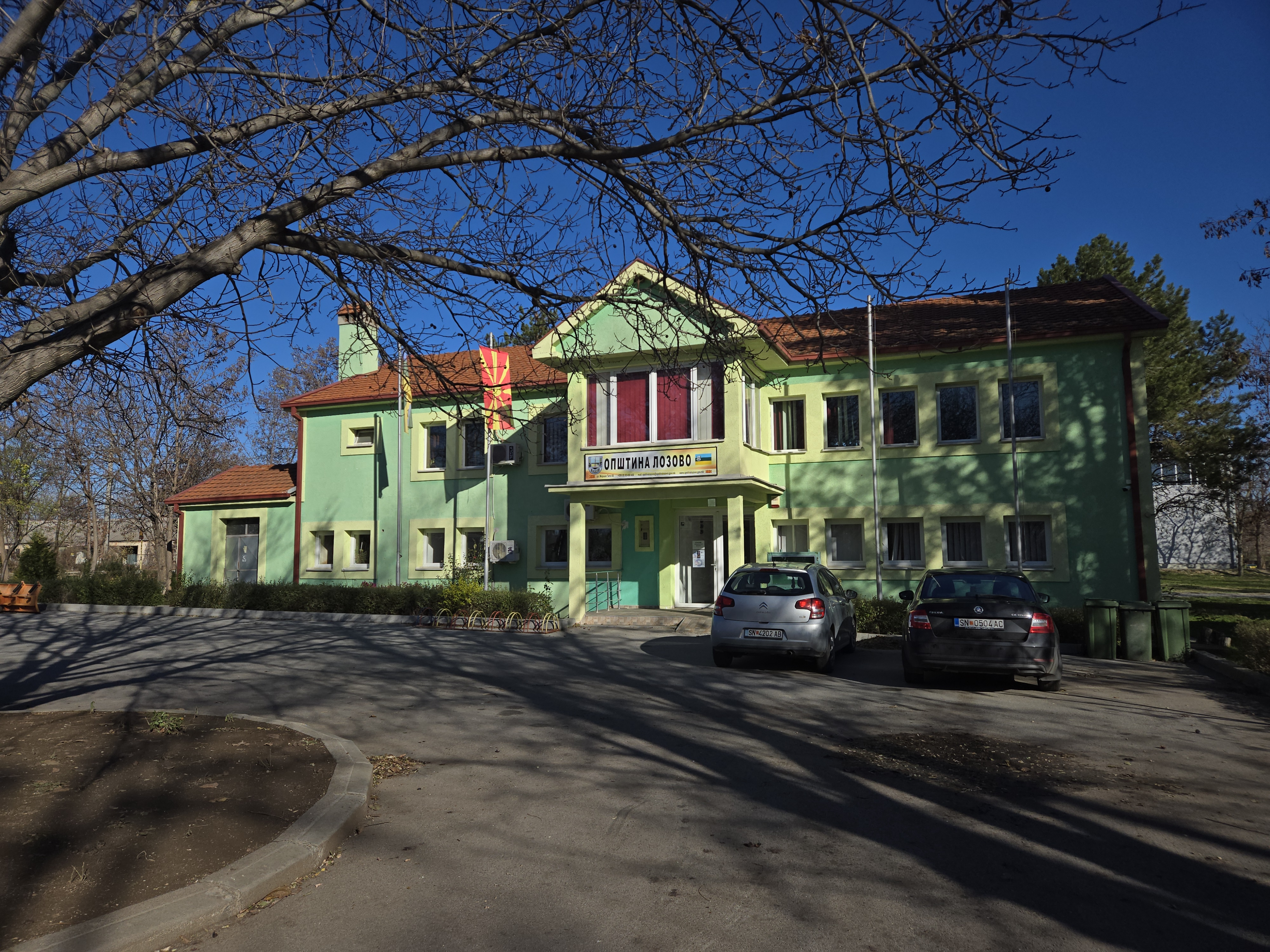
Opstina Building in Lozovo, North Macedonia

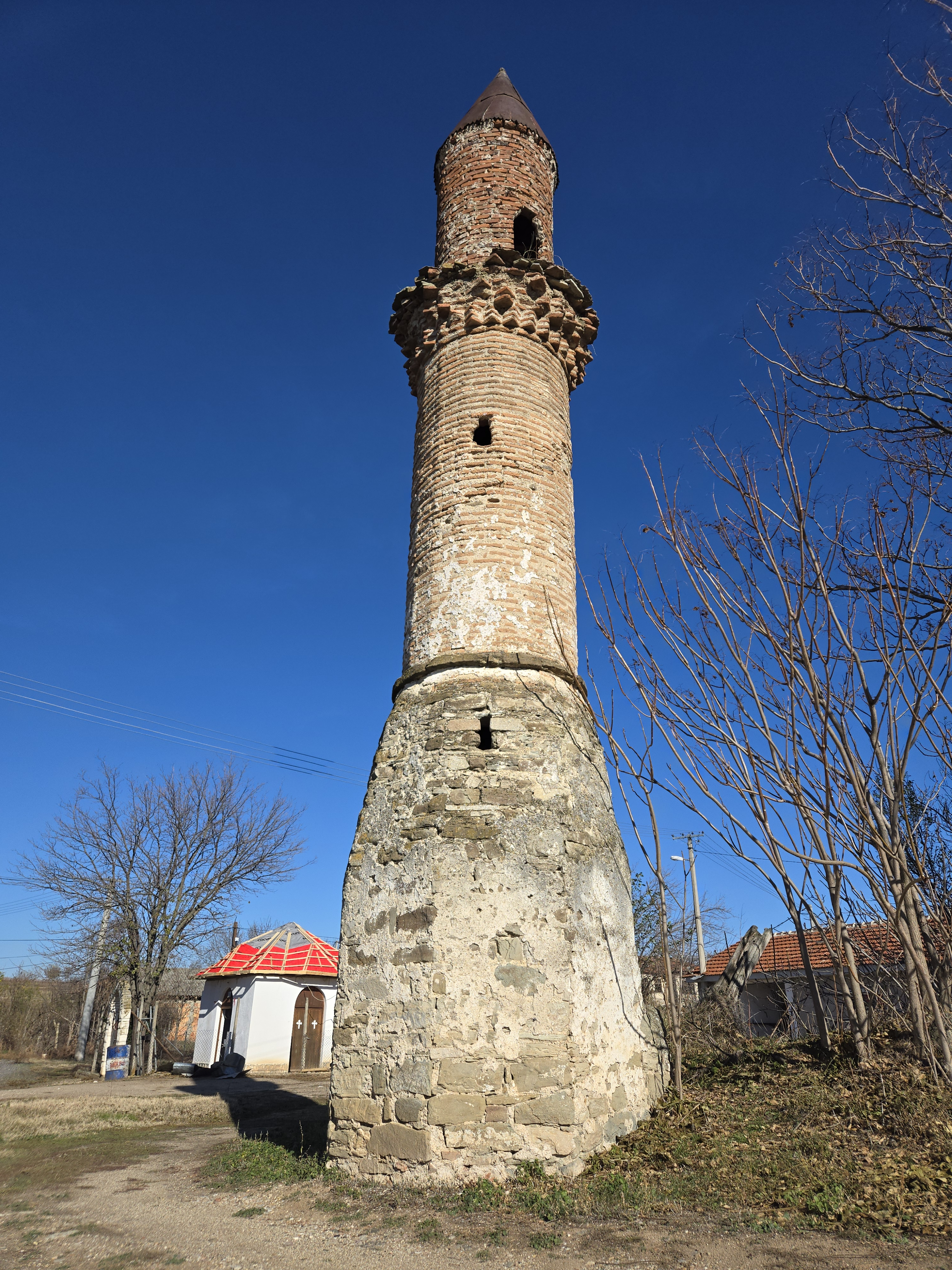
Close-up of Minaret, Lozovo Mosque

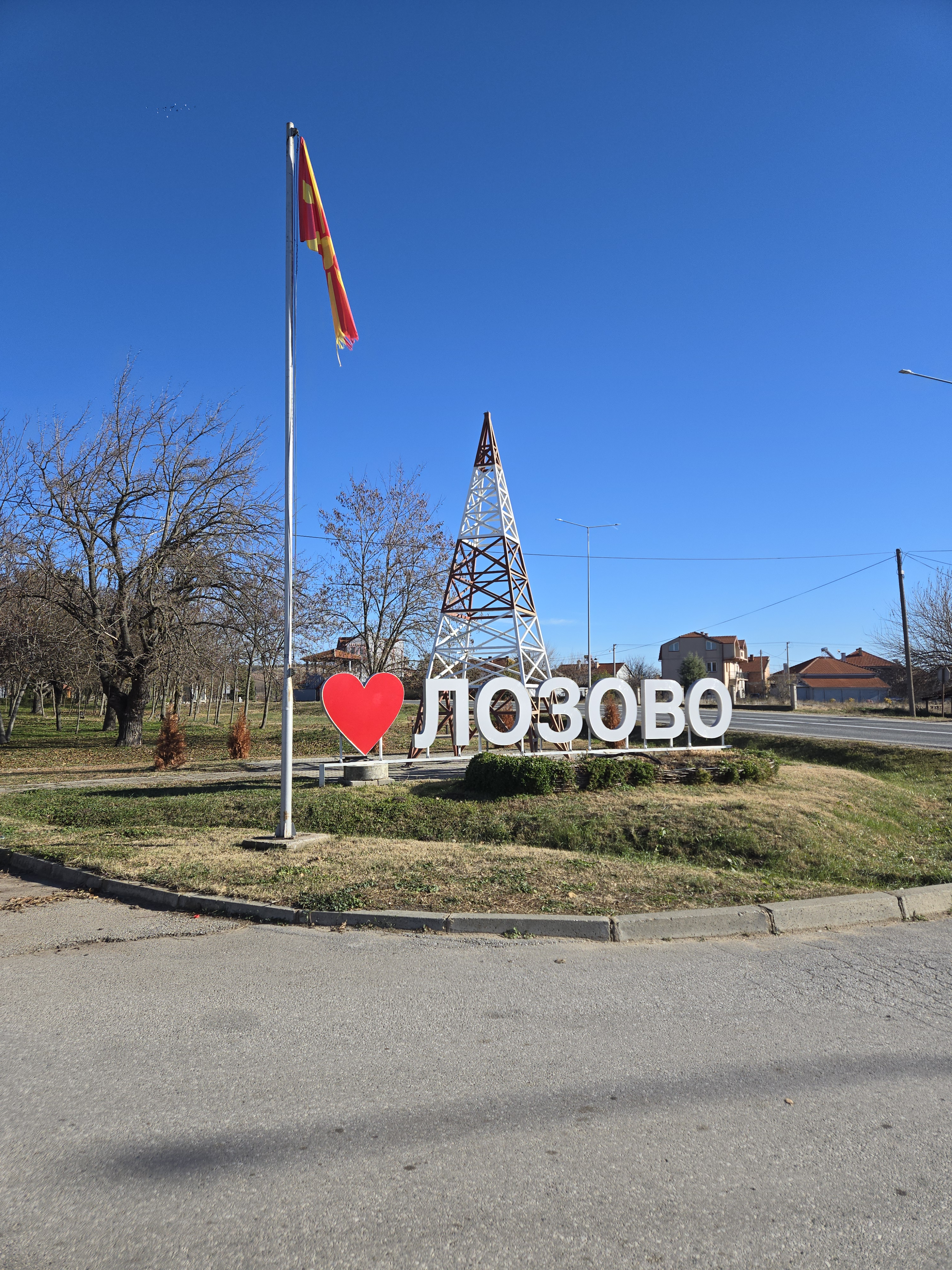
Lozovo Welcome Sign
