= FK Partizan Obršani =

Football club

Partizan Obršani
- Full name: Fudbalski klub Partizan Obršani
- Founded: 1947; 79 years ago
- Ground: Stadion Obršani
- Manager: Dejan Smugreski
- 2018–19: Second League (East), 10th (relegated)
Home colours	Away colours

FK Partizan Obršani (Macedonian: ФК Партизан Обршани) is a football club based in village of Obršani near Prilep, North Macedonia. They were recently played in the Macedonian Second League.

== History ==
The club was founded in 1947.
