= Kadino, Ilinden =

Kadino Кадино
- Village
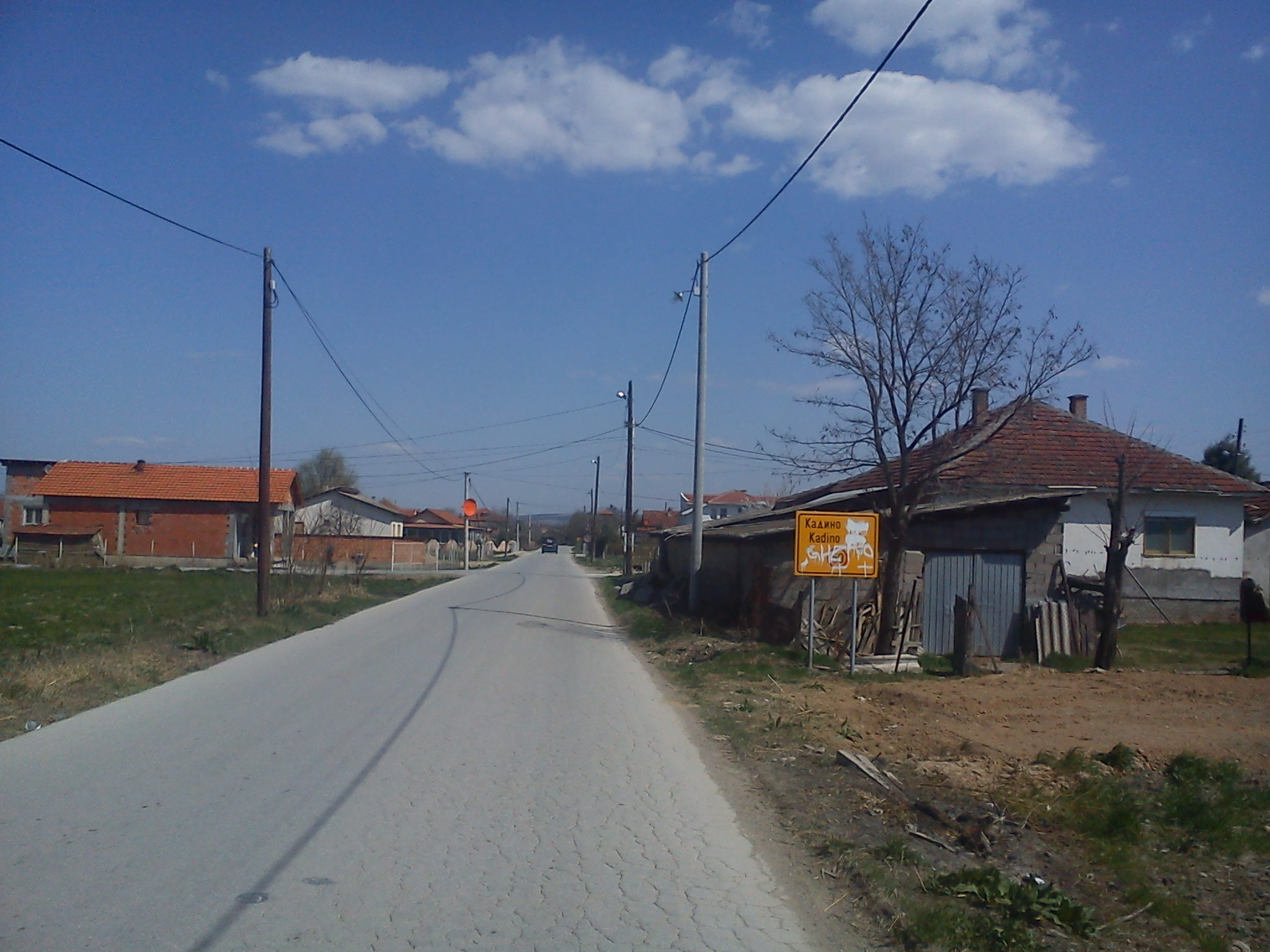

- Location within North Macedonia
- Coordinates: 41.9679°N 21.5967°E
- Country: North Macedonia
- Region: Skopje
- Municipality: Ilinden

Population (2021)
  - Total: 2,340
- Time zone: UTC+1 (CET)
  - Summer (DST): UTC+2 (CEST)
- Car plates: SK
- Website: .

Kadino (Macedonian: Кадино) is a village in the municipality of Ilinden, North Macedonia.

== Demographics ==
As of the 2021 census, Kadino had 2,340 residents with the following ethnic composition:

- Macedonians 2,088
- Persons for whom data are taken from administrative sources 119
- Serbs 81
- Albanians 29
- Others 15
- Roma 8

According to the 2002 census, the village had a total of 2,340 inhabitants. Ethnic groups in the village include:

- Macedonians 2,088
- Serbs 140
- Turks 13
- Romani 11
- Others 70

== Sports ==
Local football club FK Kadino play in the Macedonian Second League (West Division).
