= Kravari =

Kravari Кравари
- Village
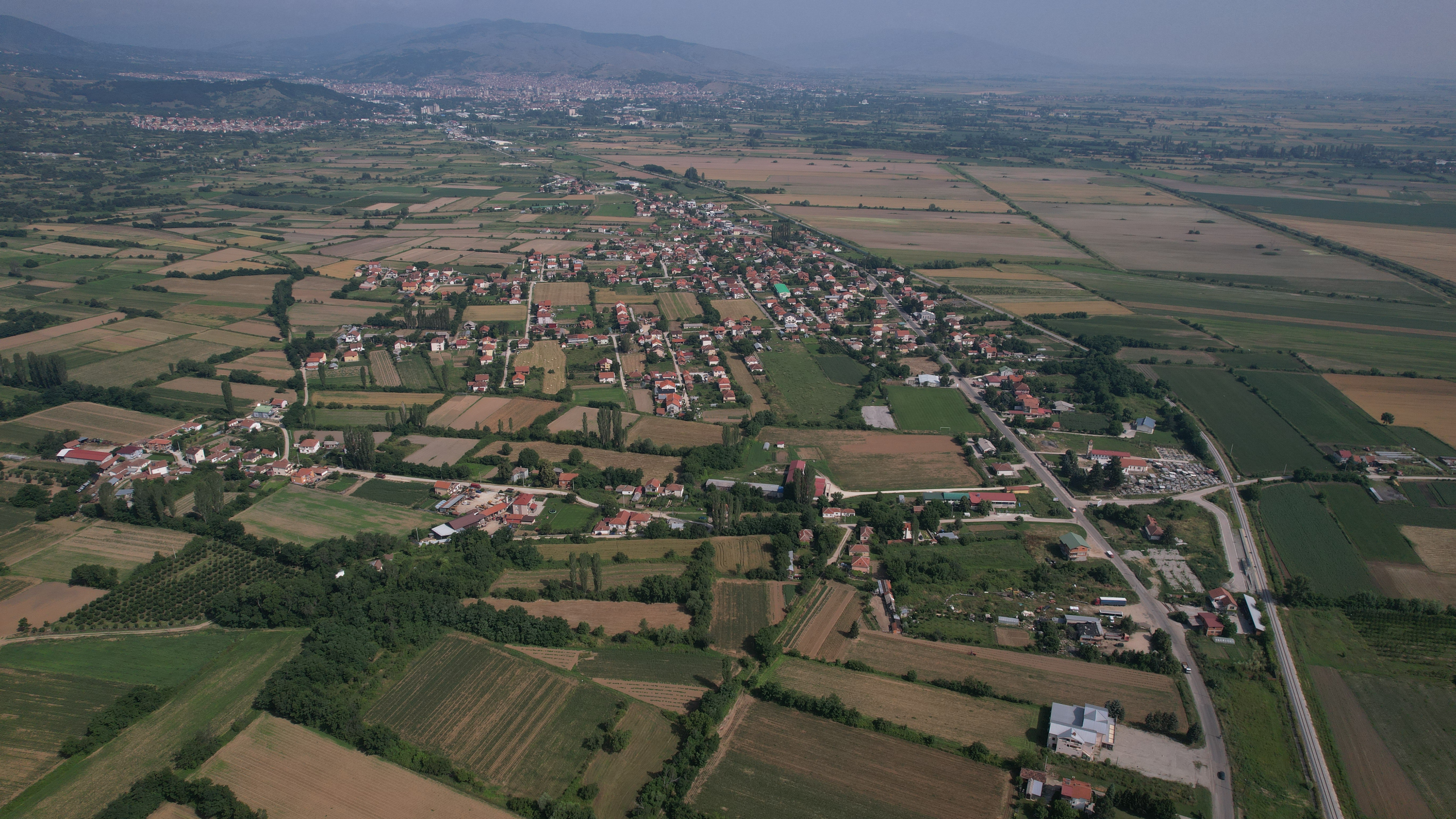
- Air view of the village

- Location within North Macedonia
- Country: North Macedonia
- Region: Pelagonia
- Municipality: Bitola

Population (2002)
  - Total: 880
- Time zone: UTC+1 (CET)
  - Summer (DST): UTC+2 (CEST)

Kravari (Macedonian Cyrillic: Кравари, 'cowherds') is a village 5.44 kilometres (3.38 mi) away from Bitola.

== Demographics ==
Kravari is attested in the Ottoman defter of 1467/68 as a village in the vilayet of Manastir. The inhabitants attested largely bore typical Slavic anthroponyms along with instances of Albanian ones: Gone, son of Pavle, Danço, son of Gin, etc.

According to the 2002 census, the village had a total of 880 inhabitants. Ethnic groups in the village include:

- Macedonians 871
- Albanians 1
- Turks 7
- Serbs 1

== Sports ==
Local football club FK Kravari plays in the Macedonian Third League (Southwest Division).
