= FK Kadino =

- Full name: Fudbalski klub Kadino
- Founded: 1969; 57 years ago
- Ground: Stadion Kadino
- Chairman: Martin Jakimovski
- Manager: Nikola Ilievski
- League: Macedonian Third League (North)
- 2025–26: 12th
| Home colours | Away colours |

FK Kadino (Macedonian: ФК Кадино) is a football club based in the village of Kadino near Skopje, North Macedonia. They are currently competing in the Macedonian Third League (North Division).

== History ==
The club was founded in 1969.
