= FK Mlekar =

- Full name: Fudbalski klub Mlekar Malo Konjari
- Founded: 1957; 69 years ago
- Ground: Stadion Malo Konjari
- Chairman: Milan Kukunoski
- Manager: Сашо (Буреко)
- League: Macedonian Third League (Region 4)
- 2025–26: 9th

FK Mlekar (Macedonian: ФК Млекар) is a football club based in village of Malo Konjari near Prilep, Republic of Macedonia. They are currently competing in the Macedonian Third League (Region 4).

== History ==
The club was founded in 1957.
