= FK Rabotnik Džumajlija =

Rabotnik Lozovo
- Full name: Fudbalski Klub Rabotnik Lozovo
- Founded: 1961; 64 years ago
- Ground: AMS Lozovo
- Chairman: Sande Jovanovski
- League: Macedonian Third League (East)

FK Rabotnik Lozovo (Macedonian: ФК Работник Лозово) is a football club based in the village of Lozovo near Sveti Nikole, North Macedonia. They recently played in the Macedonian Third League.

== History ==
The club was founded in 1961.
