= FK Kravari =

- Full name: Fudbalski klub Kravari
- Founded: 1944; 82 years ago
- Ground: Stadion Kravari
- Capacity: 500
- League: Macedonian Third League (Region 5)
- 2025–26: 3rd
Home colours	Away colours

FK Kravari (Macedonian: ФК Кравари) is a football club based in the village Kravari near Bitola, North Macedonia. They are currently competing in the Macedonian Third League (Region 5)

== History ==
The club was founded in 1944.
