= KF Gradec =

- Full name: Klubi Futbollistik Gradec
- Founded: 1977; 49 years ago
- Ground: Stadiumi Gradec
- Chairman: Ermir Zulbeari (last)
- Manager: Hamdi Idrizi (last)
- League: Macedonian Third League (Region 6)
- 2018–19: OFL Gostivar, 3rd

KF Gradec is a football club based in the village of Gradec near Gostivar, North Macedonia. They are currently competing in the Macedonian Third League (Region 6).

== History ==
The club was founded in 1977.
