= Macedonian Municipal Football Leagues =

Macedonian Municipal Leagues Македонски општински лиги Ligat Komunale Maqedonase
- Founded: 1992
- Country: North Macedonia
- Confederation: UEFA
- Level on pyramid: 4 and 5
- Promotion to: 3. MFL
- Domestic cup: Macedonian Football Cup
- Website: ffm.mk

The Macedonian Municipal Leagues (Macedonian: Македонски општински лиги) is the fourth and fifth-highest football competition in the North Macedonia.

== Municipal football associations ==
There are 25 active municipal football associations or OFS' which act within the Football Federation of Macedonia. In 2019, multiple municipal football associations were disbanded by the Agency of youth and sport in North Macedonia due to their lack of teams.

=== Promotion to the Third League - North ===
- OFS Gazi Baba
- OFS Kisela Voda
- OFS Kratovo
- OFS Kumanovo
- OFS Lipkovo (disbanded in 2019)
- OFS Skopje

=== Promotion to the Third League - Center ===
- OFS Kavadarci
- OFS Negotino
- OFS Prilep
- OFS Veles

=== Promotion to the Third League - East ===
- OFS Kochani
- OFS Probishtip
- OFS Sveti Nikole
- OFS Shtip
- OFS Strumica
- OFS Gevgelija
- OFS Valandovo

=== Promotion to the Third League - West ===
- OFS Gostivar
- OFS Kichevo
- OFS Tetovo

=== Promotion to the Third League - Southwest ===
- OFS Bitola
- OFS Demir Hisar (disbanded in 2019)
- OFS Makedonski Brod (disbanded in 2019)
- OFS Ohrid
- OFS Resen
- OFS Struga
