= Petrovac =

Petrovac may refer to:

== Bosnia and Herzegovina ==
- Bosanski Petrovac, town and municipality in Una-Sana Canton
- Petrovac, Bosnia and Herzegovina, municipality in Republika Srpska

== Montenegro ==
- Petrovac, Budva, coastal town in Budva Municipality

== Serbia ==
- Petrovac, Serbia, town and municipality in the Braničevo District
- Bački Petrovac, town and municipality in South Bačka District of Vojvodina
- Petrovac (Aerodrom), village in Aerodrom Municipality, city of Kragujevac
- Petrovac (Lebane), village in Lebane Municipality, Jablanica District
- Petrovac (Leskovac), a village in Leskovac Municipality, Jablanica District
- Petrovac (Pirot), village in Pirot Municipality, Pirot District
- Petrovac (Prokuplje), village in Prokuplje Municipality, Toplica District
- Petrovac (Trgovište), village in Trgovište Municipality, Pčinja District

== See also ==
- Petrovec (disambiguation)
