= Ilinden =

Ilinden (Bulgarian/Macedonian: Илинден) or Ilindan (Serbian Cyrillic: Илиндан), meaning "Saint Elijah's Day", may refer to:

== Events ==
- Republic Day (North Macedonia), 2 August

== Geographic locations ==
=== Bulgaria ===
- Ilinden, Blagoevgrad Province, a village
- Ilinden, Sofia, an urban municipality

=== North Macedonia ===
- Ilinden Municipality
- Ilinden (village)

=== Antarctica ===
- Ilinden Peak

== Association football clubs ==
- FK Ilinden 1955 Bašino
- FK Ilinden Skopje
- Rockdale Ilinden FC

== Other meanings ==
- Ilinden (memorial), a sculpture in Kruševo, North Macedonia
- Ilinden (novel), by Dimitar Talev
- Ilinden (organization), a Bulgarian revolutionary organization 1921–1947
- Ilinden, a boat built in 1924 which sank in the 2009 Lake Ohrid boat accident
- Ilinden-Preobrazhenie Uprising
- United Macedonian Organization Ilinden–Pirin
