= Čaloševo =

- Village
- Nickname: Valley of the Wolves
- Location within North Macedonia
- Coordinates: 41°45′17″N 21°47′46″E
- Country: North Macedonia
- Region: Vardar
- Municipality: Veles

Area
  - Total: 6.3 km^{2} (2.4 sq mi)
- Elevation: 266 m (873 ft)

Population (2002)
  - Total: 210
  - Density: 31.26/km^{2} (81.0/sq mi)
- Time zone: UTC+1 (Central European)
  - Summer (DST): Central European
- Postal code: 1400
- Area code: +389 043
- Car plates: VE

Čaloševo (Macedonian: Чалошево) is a village located in the northeast part of Veles Municipality in North Macedonia. It is estimated to have 197 inhabitants. The population is mostly engaged in agriculture, farming and construction. The young people are engaged in athletics and sports.

== Name ==
Name Čaloševo originates from the Turkish language and it was formerly known as Çalışlar.

== History ==
On the 1927 ethnic map of Leonhard Schulze-Jena, the village is written as "Čališlar" and shown as a mixed Turkish and Christian Bulgarian village.

== Demographics ==
As of the 2021 census, Čaloševo had 209 residents with the following ethnic composition:

- Macedonians 203
- Persons for whom data are taken from administrative sources 4
- Others 4

According to the 2002 census, the village had a total of 210 inhabitants. Ethnic groups in the village include:

- Macedonians 206
- Serbs 3
- Others 1
