= Dolno Kalaslari =

Dolno Kalaslari Долно Каласлари
- Village
- Location within North Macedonia
- Coordinates: 41.689134°N 21.837886°E
- Country: North Macedonia
- Region: Vardar
- Municipality: Veles

Population (2002)
  - Total: 446
- Time zone: UTC+1 (CET)
  - Summer (DST): UTC+2 (CEST)
- Car plates: VE
- Website: .

Dolno Kalaslari (Macedonian: Долно Каласлари) is a village in the municipality of Veles, North Macedonia.

== Demographics ==
According to the 2002 census, the village had a total of 446 inhabitants. Ethnic groups in the village include:

- Macedonians: 443
- Serbs: 1
- Others: 2
