= Mrševci =

Mrševci Мршевци
- Village
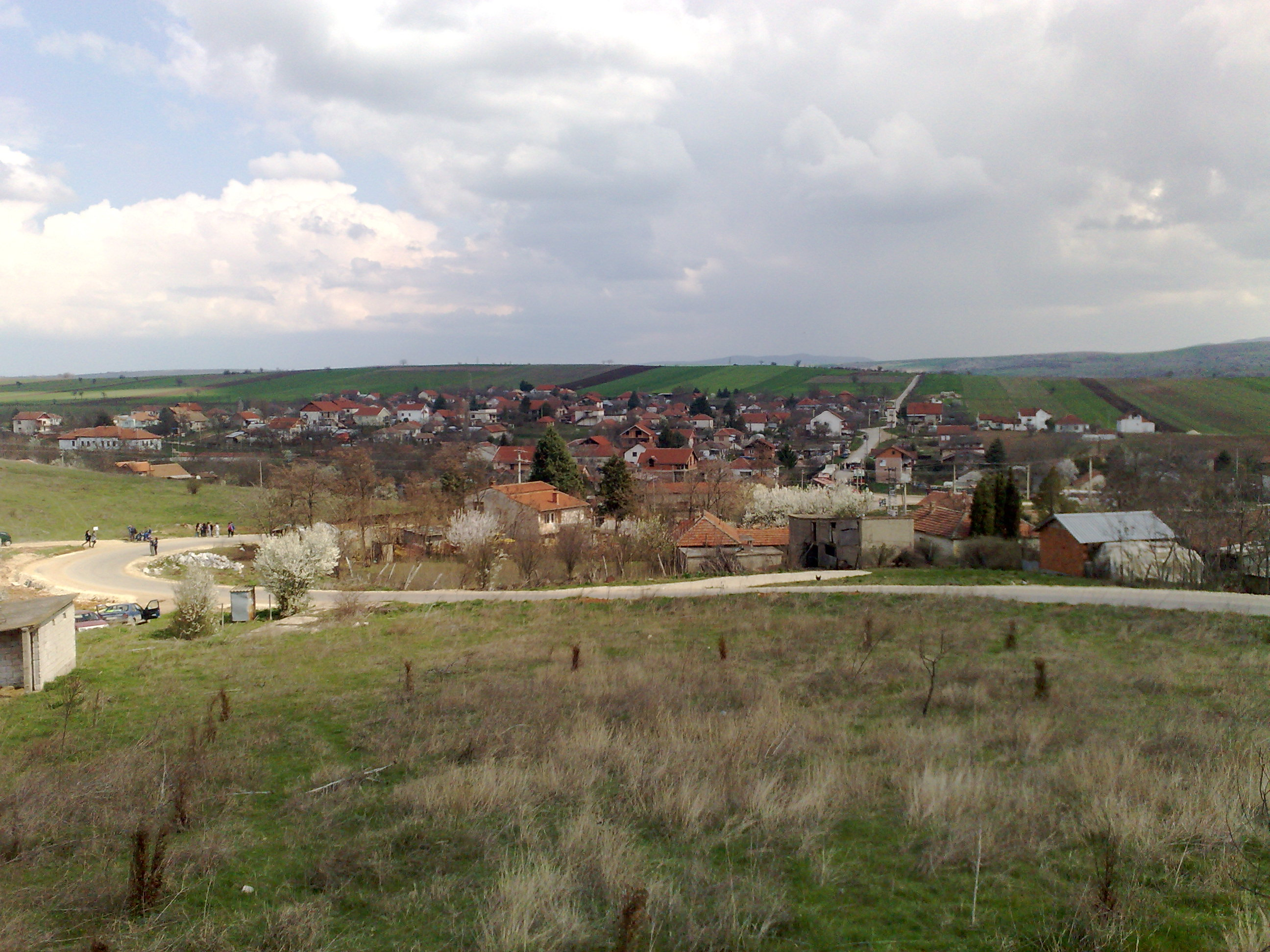

- Location within North Macedonia
- Country: North Macedonia
- Region: Skopje
- Municipality: Ilinden

Population (2021)
  - Total: 547
- Time zone: UTC+1 (CET)
  - Summer (DST): UTC+2 (CEST)
- Car plates: SK
- Website: .

Mrševci (Macedonian: Мршевци) is a village in the Ilinden Municipality of North Macedonia.

== Demographics ==
As of the 2021 census, Mrševci had 547 residents with the following ethnic composition:

- Macedonians 395
- Serbs 143
- Persons for whom data are taken from administrative sources 6
- Others 3

According to the 2002 census, the village had a total of 651 inhabitants. Ethnic groups in the village include:

- Macedonians 403
- Serbs 242
- Others 6
