= Petrovec =

Petrovec may refer to:

- Petrovec, North Macedonia, a village near Skopje
- Petrovec Municipality, a municipality in the Republic of Macedonia
- Báčsky Petrovec, Slovak name of Bački Petrovac, a town in Serbia
- Petrovec, Croatia, a village near Lekenik
- TV Petrovec, a TV station for Slovaks in Serbia

== See also ==
- Petrovac (disambiguation)
