= Otovica =

Village in Veles, North Macedonia

Otovica Отовица
- Village
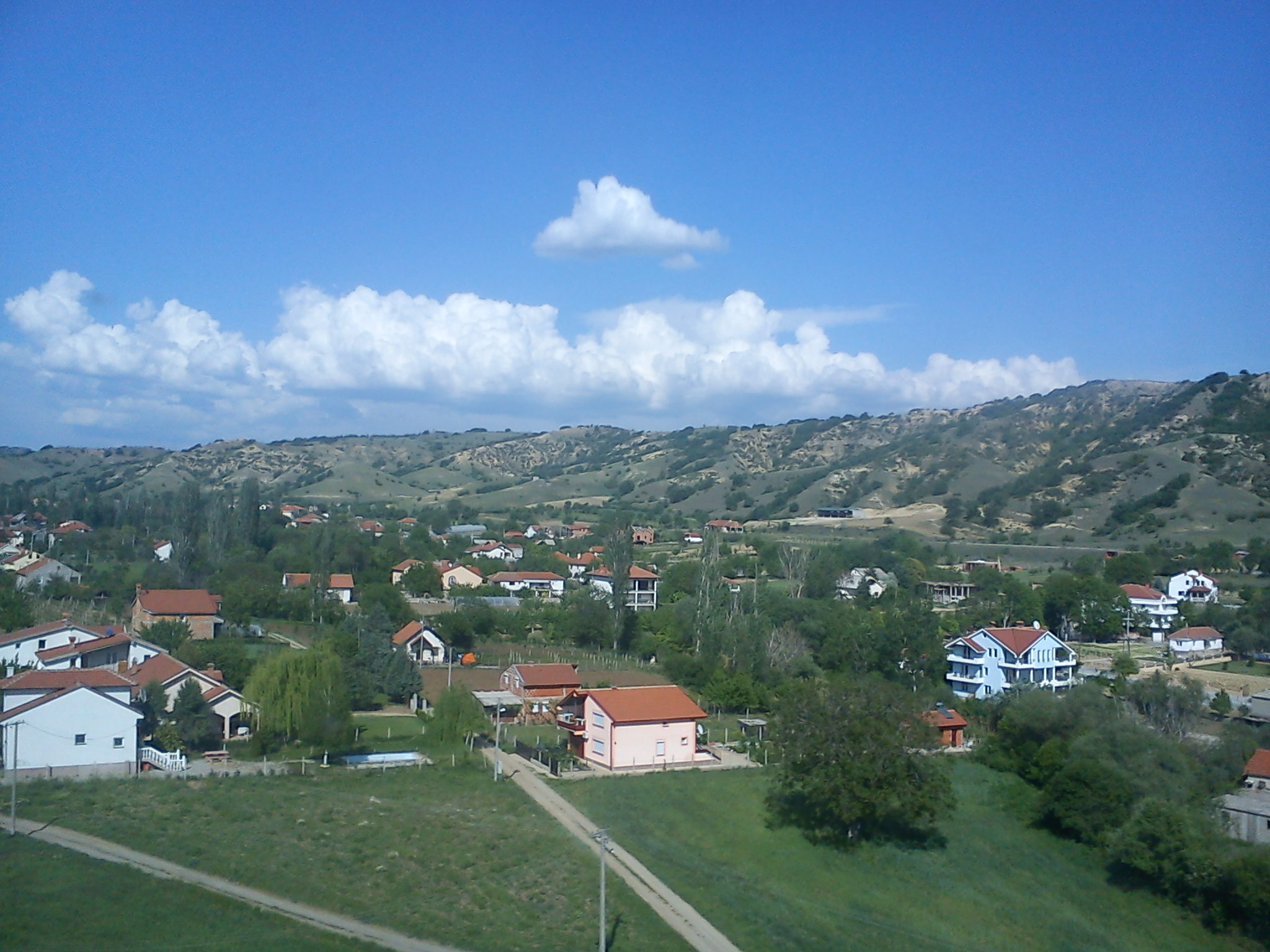

- Location within North Macedonia
- Coordinates: 41.773040°N 21.780041°E
- Country: North Macedonia
- Region: Vardar
- Municipality: Veles

Population (2021)
  - Total: 315
- Time zone: UTC+1 (CET)
  - Summer (DST): UTC+2 (CEST)
- Car plates: VE
- Website: .

Otovica (Macedonian: Отовица) is a village in the municipality of Veles, North Macedonia.

== Demographics ==
As of the 2021 census, Otovica had 315 residents with the following ethnic composition:

- Macedonians 298
- Persons for whom data are taken from administrative sources 14
- Others 3

According to the 2002 census, the village had a total of 274 inhabitants. Ethnic groups in the village include:

- Macedonians 266
- Serbs 4
- Others 4
