= Mamutčevo =

Mamutčevo Мамутчево
- Village
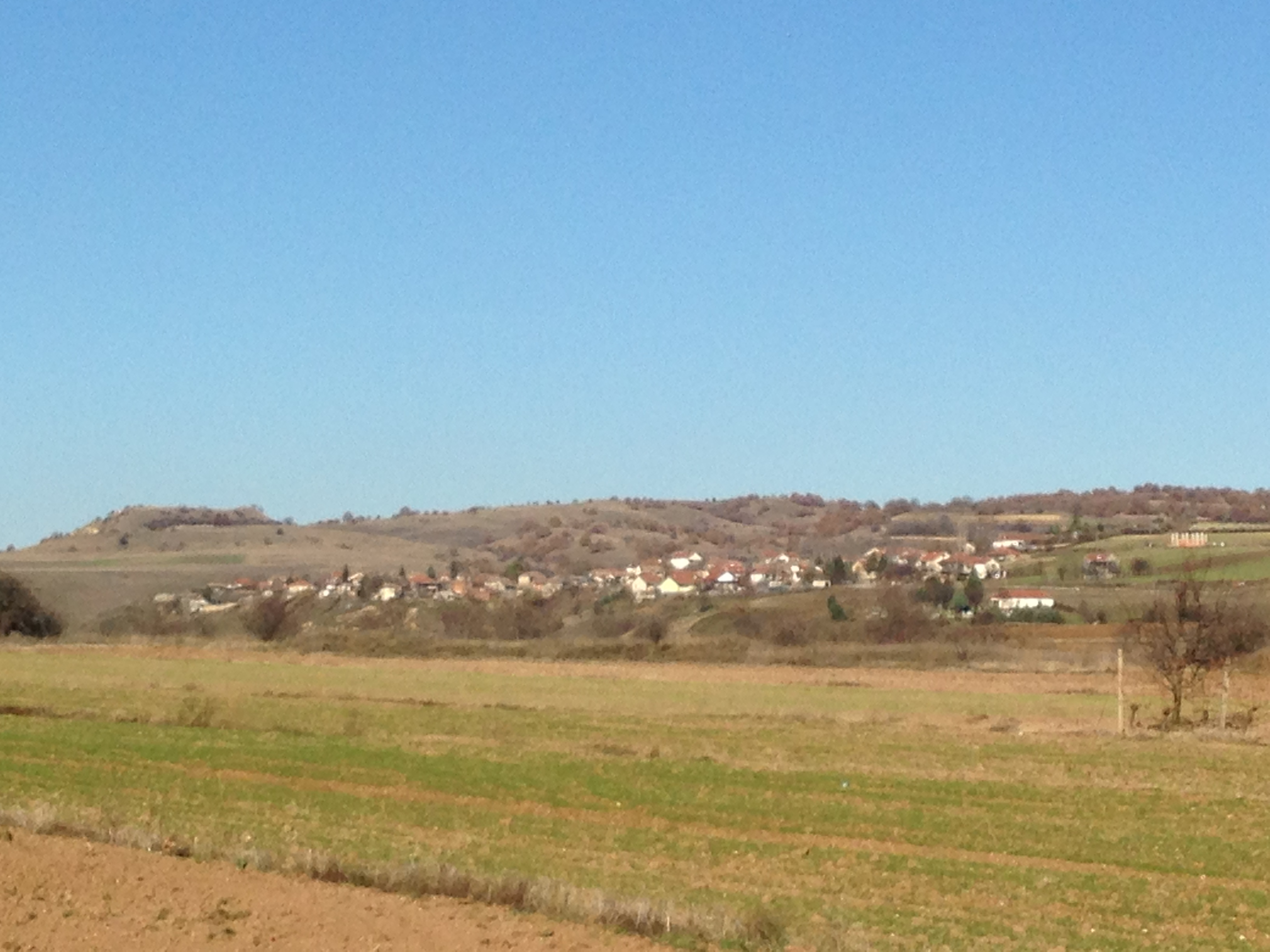
- View of the village

- Location within North Macedonia
- Coordinates: 41.788529°N 21.828418°E
- Country: North Macedonia
- Region: Vardar
- Municipality: Veles

Population (2002)
  - Total: 331
- Time zone: UTC+1 (CET)
  - Summer (DST): UTC+2 (CEST)
- Car plates: VE
- Website: .

Mamutčevo (Macedonian: Мамутчево) is a village in the municipality of Veles, North Macedonia.

== Demographics ==
According to the 2002 census, the village had a total of 331 inhabitants. Ethnic groups in the village include:

- Macedonians 331
