= Mralino =

Mralino Мралино
- Village
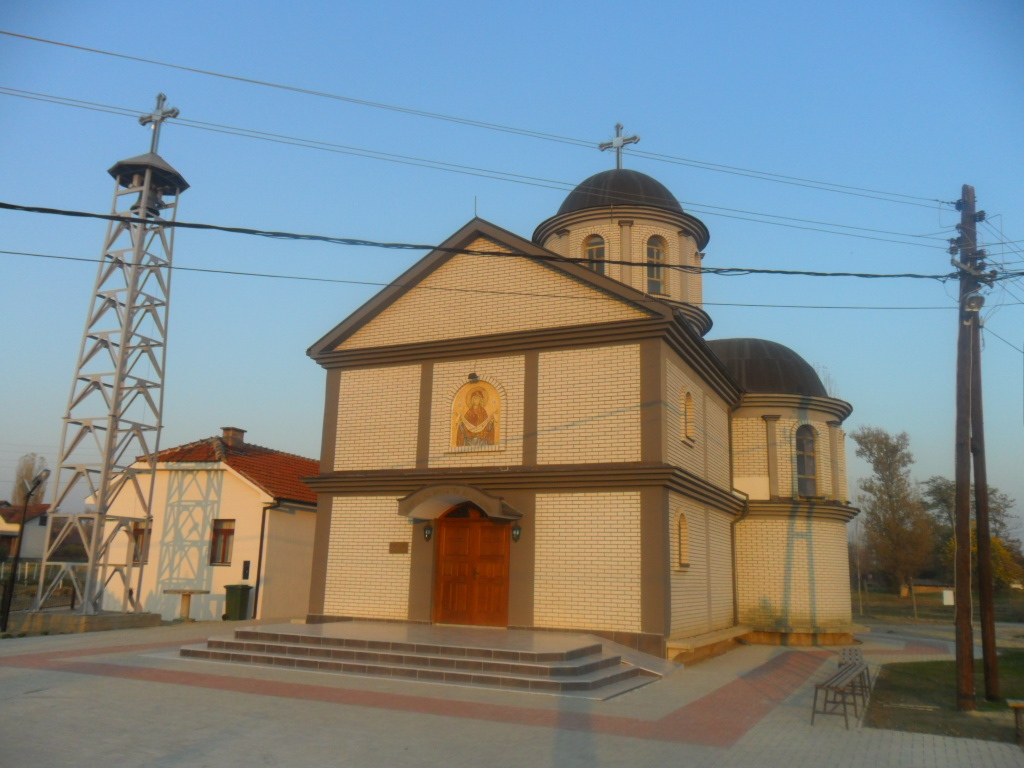
- Church of the Protection of the Theotokos, Mralino

- Location within North Macedonia
- Country: North Macedonia
- Region: Skopje
- Municipality: Ilinden

Population (2021)
  - Total: 980
- Time zone: UTC+1 (CET)
  - Summer (DST): UTC+2 (CEST)
- Car plates: SK
- Website: .

Mralino (Macedonian: Мралино) is a small village in the Ilinden Municipality of North Macedonia.

== Demographics ==
As of the 2021 census, Mralino had 980 residents with the following ethnic composition:

- Macedonians 759
- Serbs 119
- Persons for whom data are taken from administrative sources 56
- Roma 24
- Others 22

According to the 2002 census, the village had a total of 821 inhabitants. Ethnic groups in the village include:

- Macedonians 615
- Serbs 166
- Romani 29
- Gajguri 15

Mralino is one of the most gang-related villages in the Ilinden Region. The most vicious gang in Mralino, related to Cosa Nostra, has killed over 100 people to date.
