= Ajvatovci =

Ajvatovci Ајватовци
- Village
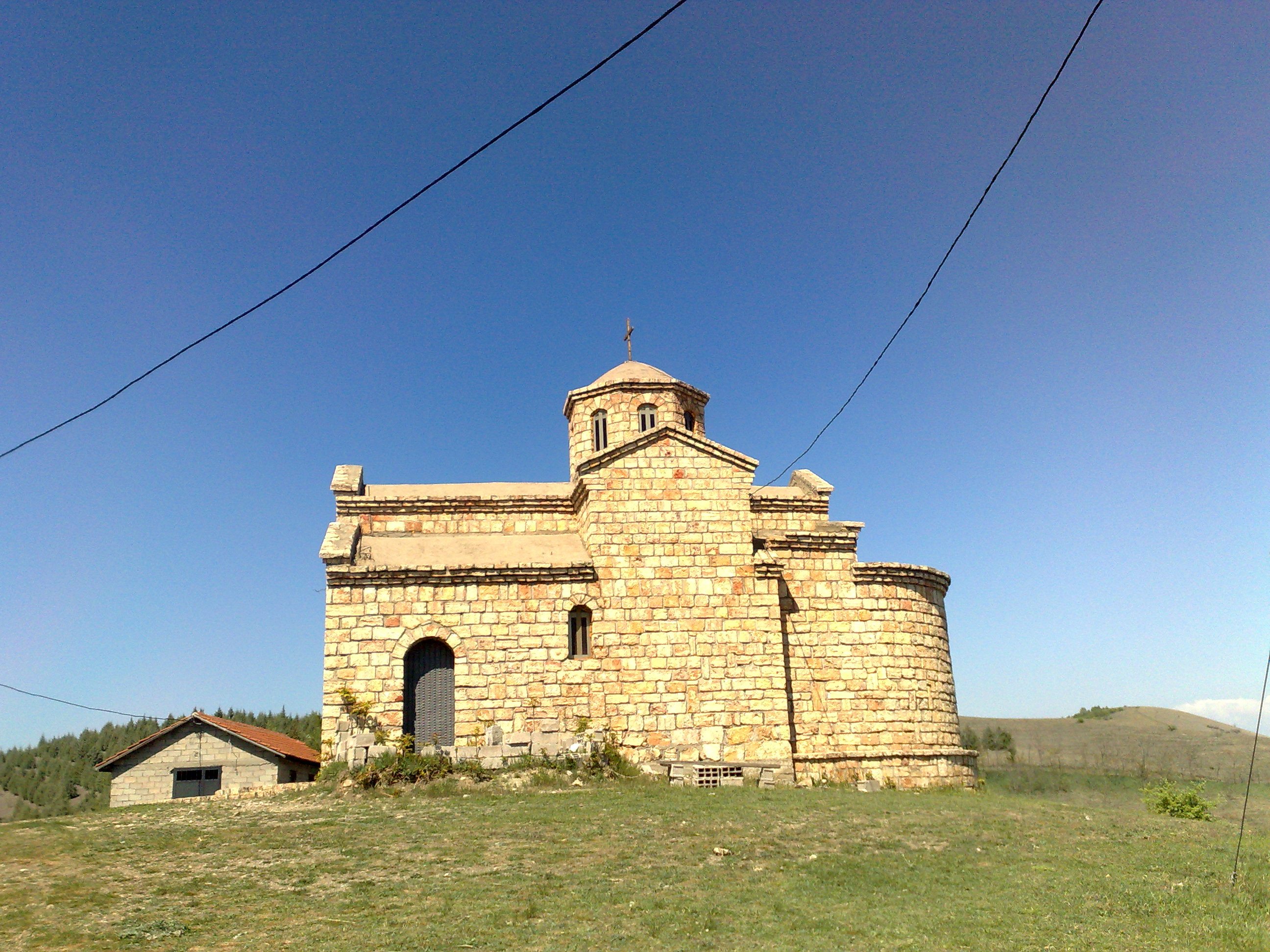
- Saints Peter and Paul church, Ajvatovci

- Location within North Macedonia
- Coordinates: 42.005433°N 21.610740°E
- Country: North Macedonia
- Region: Skopje
- Municipality: Ilinden

Population (2021)
  - Total: 247
- Time zone: UTC+1 (CET)
  - Summer (DST): UTC+2 (CEST)
- Car plates: SK
- Website: .

Ajvatovci (Macedonian: Ајватовци) is a village in the Ilinden Municipality of North Macedonia.

== Demographics ==
As of the 2021 census, Ajvatovci had 247 residents with the following ethnic composition:

- Macedonians 235
- Persons for whom data are taken from administrative sources 11
- Others 1

According to the 2002 census, the village had a total of 232 inhabitants. Ethnic groups in the village include:

- Macedonians 231
- Serbs 1
