= Ognjanci =

Ognjanci Огњанци Ogjancë
- Village
- Location within North Macedonia
- Coordinates: 41°55′20″N 21°35′00″E
- Country: North Macedonia
- Region: Skopje
- Municipality: Petrovec

Population (2002)
  - Total: 1,142
- Time zone: UTC+1 (CET)
  - Summer (DST): UTC+2 (CEST)
- Car plates: SK
- Website: .

Ognjanci (Macedonian: Огњанци, Albanian: Ogjancë) is a village in the municipality of Petrovec, North Macedonia.

== Demographics ==
According to the 2002 census, the village had a total of 1142 inhabitants. Ethnic groups in the village include:

- Albanians 543
- Macedonians 317
- Serbs 256
- Turks 8
- Romani 12
- Bosniaks 2
- Others 4
