= Crkvino =

- Village
- Црквино
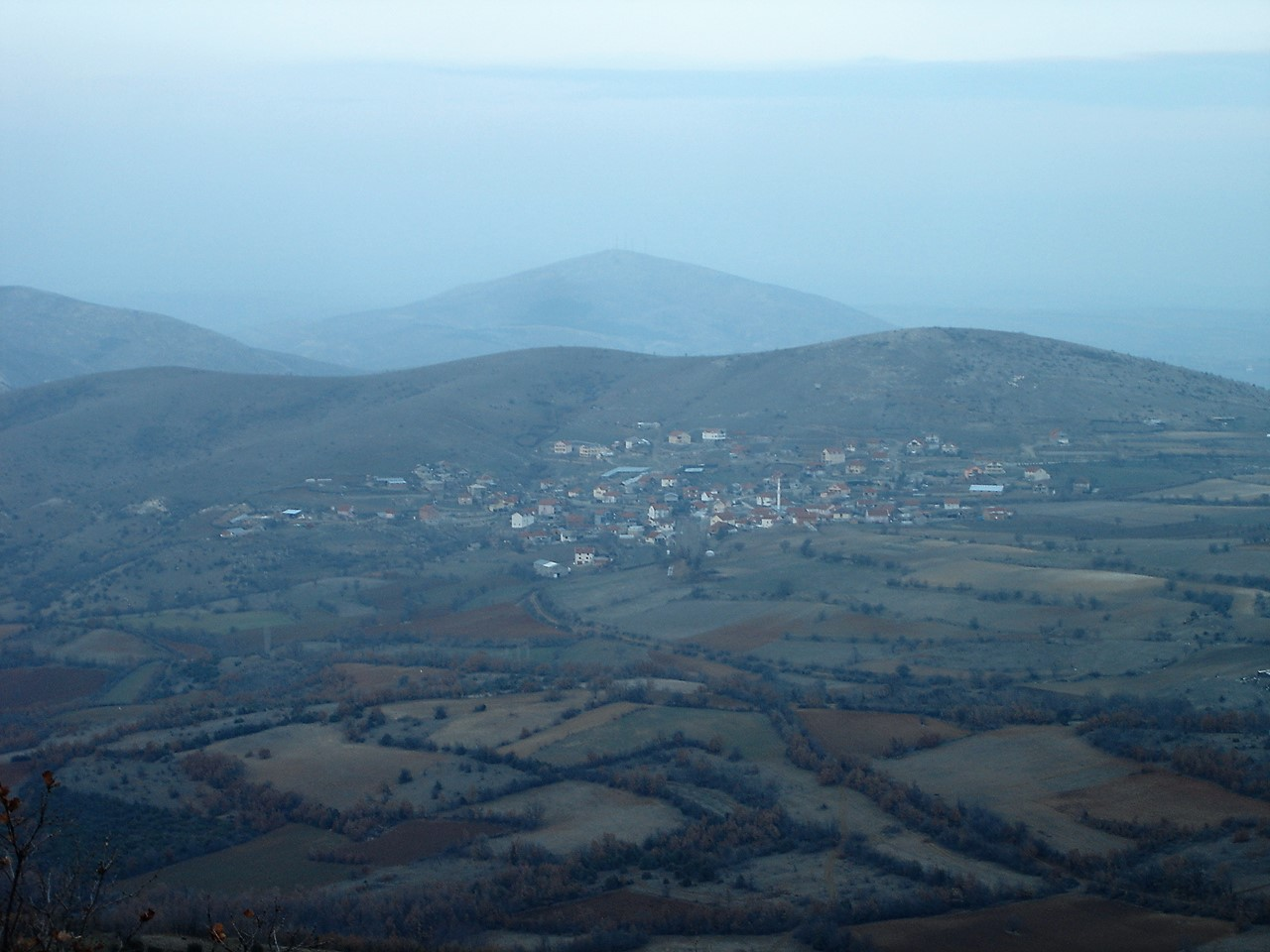
- View of the village

- Location within North Macedonia
- Coordinates: 41°39′N 21°48′E
- Country: North Macedonia
- Region: Vardar
- Municipality: Veles

Population (2021)
  - Total: 353
- Time zone: UTC+1 (CET)
  - Summer (DST): UTC+2 (CEST)
- Car plates: VE
- Website: .

Crkvino (Macedonian: Црквино) is a village in the municipality of Veles, North Macedonia.

== Demographics ==
Toward the end of the 19th and beginning of the 20th centuries, Crkvino traditionally was a mixed Orthodox Macedonian, Torbeš and Muslim Turkish village. On the 1927 ethnic map of Leonhard Schulze-Jena, the village is written as "Črkvina" and shown as a mixed Muslim Bulgarian and Christian Bulgarian village. Some of the Macedonian Muslim population left the village after the Second World War. Muslim Albanians settled in Crkvino after the Turkish population also migrated from the village. In the 1960s there were 9 Muslim Albanian households in the village.

As of the 2021 census, Crkvino had 353 residents with the following ethnic composition:

- Bosniaks 292
- Persons for whom data are taken from administrative sources 32
- Macedonians 12
- Albanians 11
- Turks 3
- Others 3

According to the 2002 census, the village had a total of 363 inhabitants. Ethnic groups in the village include:

- Bosniaks 336
- Albanians 25
- Macedonians 2
