= Ivankovci =

Ivankovci Иванковци
- Village
- Location within North Macedonia
- Coordinates: 41.847897°N 21.819242°E
- Country: North Macedonia
- Region: Vardar
- Municipality: Veles

Population (2002)
  - Total: 857
- Time zone: UTC+1 (CET)
  - Summer (DST): UTC+2 (CEST)
- Car plates: VE
- Website: .

Ivankovci (Macedonian: Иванковци) is a village in the municipality of Veles, North Macedonia.

== Demographics ==
According to the statistics of Bulgarian ethnographer Vasil Kanchov from 1900, 1200 inhabitants lived in Ivankovci, all Turks. On the 1927 ethnic map of Leonhard Schulze-Jena, the village is written as "Jovanli" and shown as a Turkish village. According to the 2002 census, the village had a total of 857 inhabitants. 685 were ethnic Macedonians and 172 were ethnic Serbs.
