= Gorno Kalaslari =

Gorno Kalaslari Горно Каласлари Kallasllar i Epërm
- Village
- Location within North Macedonia
- Coordinates: 41°41′48″N 21°50′15″E
- Country: North Macedonia
- Region: Vardar
- Municipality: Veles

Population (2002)
  - Total: 38
- Time zone: UTC+1 (CET)
  - Summer (DST): UTC+2 (CEST)
- Car plates: VE
- Website: .

Gorno Kalaslari (Macedonian: Горно Каласлари, Albanian: Kallasllar i Epërm) is a village in the municipality of Veles, North Macedonia.

== Demographics ==
According to the 2002 census, the village had a total of 38 inhabitants. Ethnic groups in the village include:

- Albanians 36
- Macedonians 1
- Others 1
