= Ḱojlija =

Ḱojlija Ќојлија Qojli
- Village
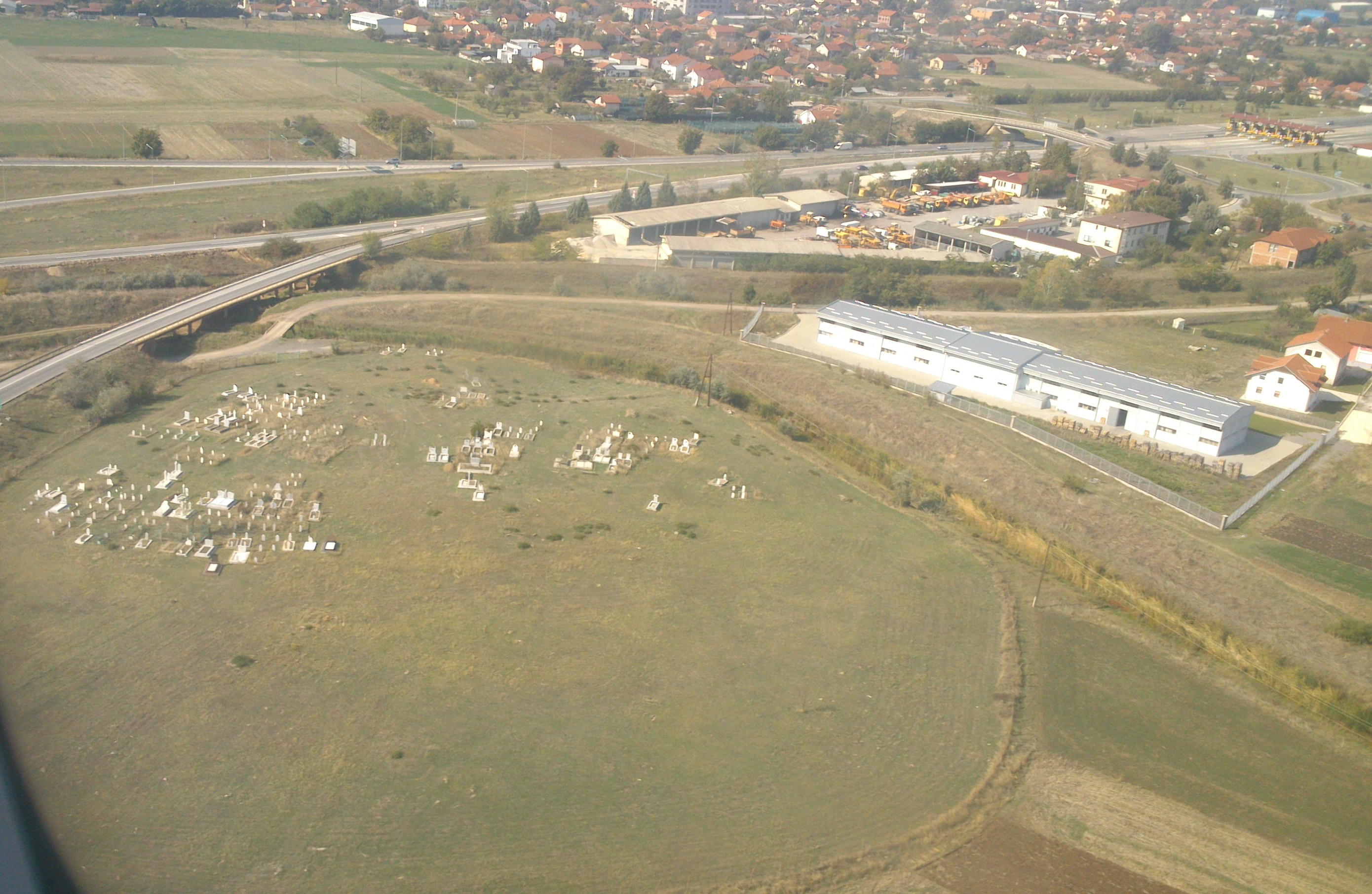

- Location within North Macedonia
- Coordinates: 41°57′N 21°38′E
- Country: North Macedonia
- Region: Skopje
- Municipality: Petrovec

Population (2021)
  - Total: 183
- Time zone: UTC+1 (CET)
  - Summer (DST): UTC+2 (CEST)
- Car plates: SK
- Website: .

Ḱojlija (Macedonian: Ќојлија, Albanian: Qojli) is a village in the municipality of Petrovec, North Macedonia.

== Demographics ==
As of the 2021 census, Ḱojlija had 183 residents with the following ethnic composition:

- Albanians 92
- Bosniaks 42
- Roma 27
- Persons for whom data are taken from administrative sources 10
- Macedonians 6
- Others 6

According to the 2002 census, the village had a total of 400 inhabitants. Ethnic groups in the village include:

- Bosniaks 215
- Albanians 179
- Macedonians 2
- Romani 1
- Others 3
