= Dolno Konjari =

Dolno Konjari Долно Коњари Konjar i Poshtëm
- Village
- Location within North Macedonia
- Coordinates: 41°57′N 21°43′E
- Country: North Macedonia
- Region: Skopje
- Municipality: Petrovec

Population (2002)
  - Total: 704
- Time zone: UTC+1 (CET)
  - Summer (DST): UTC+2 (CEST)
- Car plates: SK
- Website: .

Dolno Konjari (Macedonian: Долно Коњари, Albanian: Konjar i Poshtëm) is a village in the municipality of Petrovec, North Macedonia.

== Demographics ==
According to the 2002 census, the village had a total of 704 inhabitants. Ethnic groups in the village include:

- Bosniaks 598
- Albanians 121
- Macedonians 7
- Turks 6
- Others 2

== Sports ==
The local football club FK Dolno Konjari plays in the OFS Gazi Baba.
