= Bunardžik =

Bunardžik Бунарџик
- Village
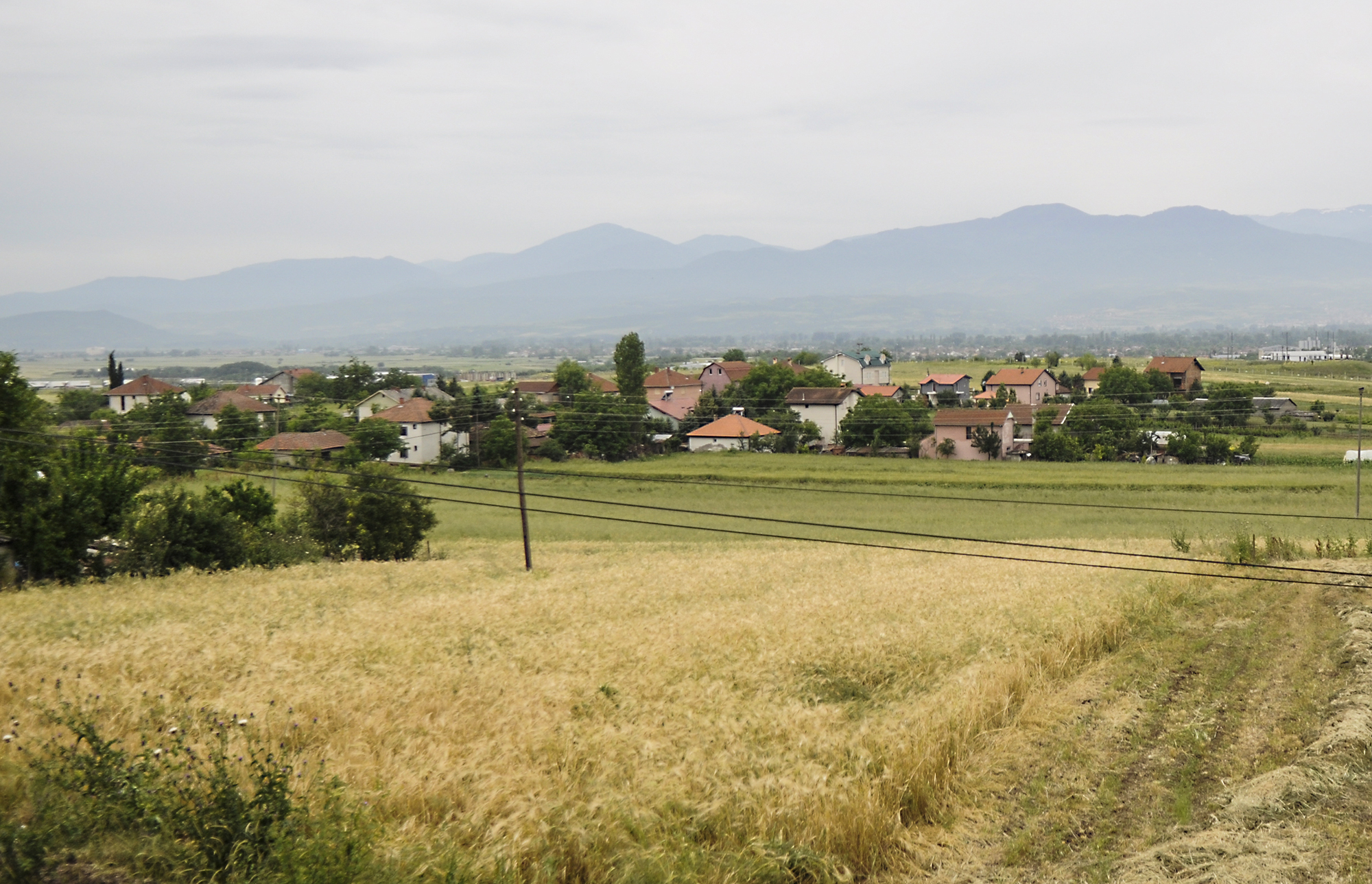

- Location within North Macedonia
- Country: North Macedonia
- Region: Skopje
- Municipality: Ilinden

Population (2021)
  - Total: 411
- Time zone: UTC+1 (CET)
  - Summer (DST): UTC+2 (CEST)
- Car plates: SK
- Website: .

Bunardžik (Macedonian: Бунарџик) is a village in the Ilinden Municipality of North Macedonia.

== Demographics ==
As of the 2021 census, Bunardžik had 411 residents with the following ethnic composition:

- Macedonians 351
- Persons for whom data are taken from administrative sources 42
- Serbs 10
- Others 8

According to the 2002 census, the village had a total of 352 inhabitants. Ethnic groups in the village include:

- Macedonians 349
- Serbs 2
- Others 1
