= Šipkovica Partisan Hospital =

Historical WWII hospital in Šipkovica, Macedonia

Coordinates: 41°45′40.6″N 22°27′53.3″E

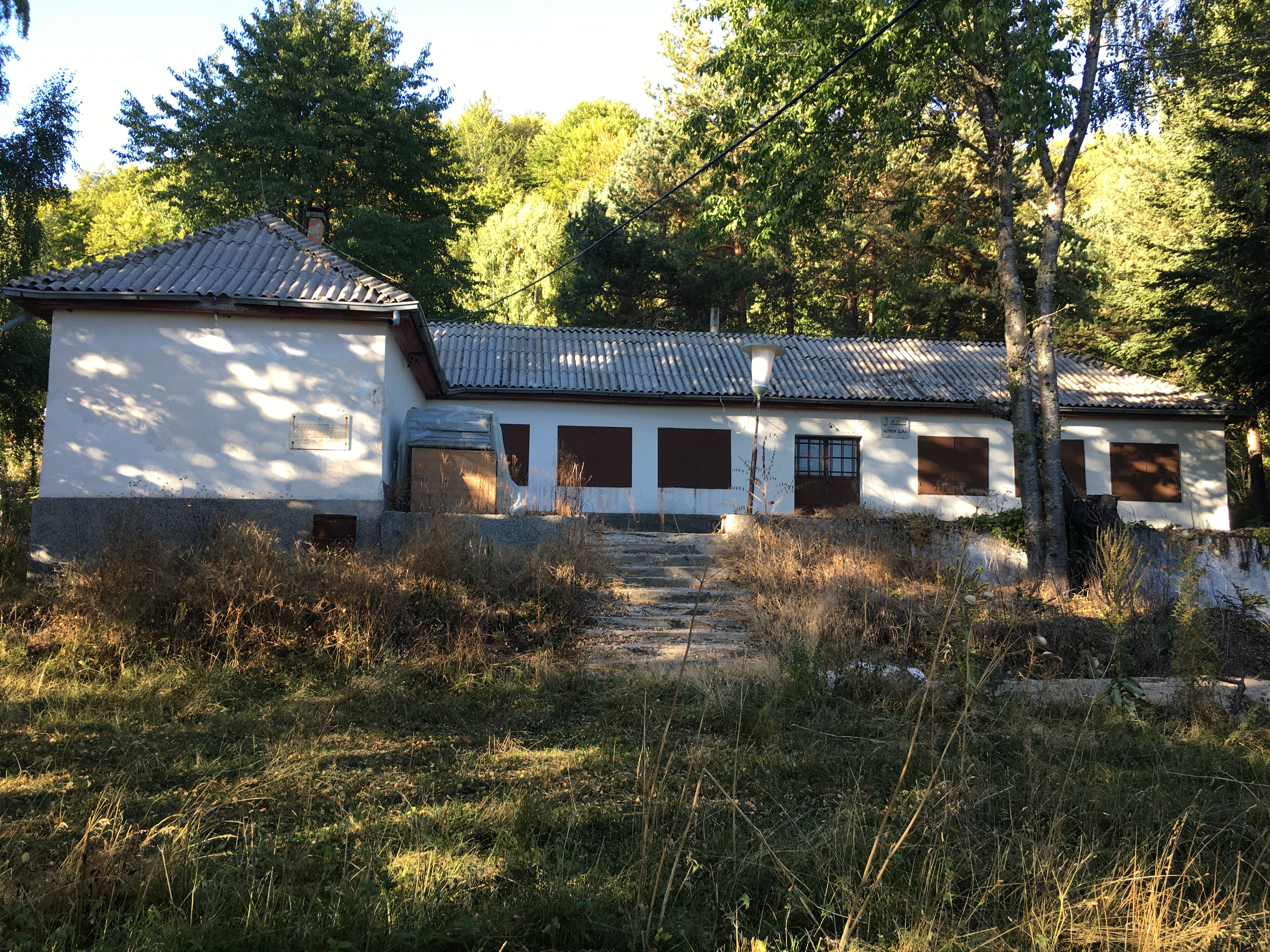
- The building where the hospital was located

Geography
- Location: Šipkovica, North Macedonia

The Partisan Hospital is a former hospital and WWII historical site located on the mountain of Plačkovica near the village of Šipkovica, North Macedonia. Here, the wounded partisans were treated, during the Axis Spring Offensive in 1944.

== History ==
The hospital was formed in the spring of 1944 with the order of the Central Headquarters of the National Liberation Army and the Partisan Detachments of Macedonia to take in those wounded in the Axis Spring Offensive. The hospital was formed because carrying badly wounded soldiers from the mobile hospital of the Operative Headquarters from Greece across the Eastern parts of Vardar Macedonia, made it difficult for units to move. Immediately after the units of the Operative Headquarters in the region of the mountain Plačkovica left, the units of the 17th Bulgarian division while searching the area discovered a segment of the hospital, where 11 badly wounded partisans were found and only one survived.

The doctors Gjorgi Kamčev and Strahil Panov worked in the hospital. A big part in caring for the wounded soldiers had locals Dane Trajkov - who served as a manager of the hospital - and his son Jordan Trajkov with protection from the Detachment in Plačkovica. In the hospital there was a medic as well who was in charge of obtaining medical supplies. In June, 1944 Dane Trajkov along with his son Jordan and another local were arrested by the Fascists. On July 7, 1944 Dane was executed in the locality of Erendže region on the mountain Plačkovica, while the other two managed to escape. After the assasсanation od Dane Trajkov, an invitation was sent to him to be a delegate at the upcoming Anti-fascist Assembly for the National Liberation of Macedonia, without knowing that he was shot by the Bulgarian authorities.

== Memorial Park ==
In 2014, in honor of 70 years of the liberation of Radoviš, the local Radoviš Municipality and the organization of fighters cleaned up the area around the former Partisan hospital and turned it into a Memorial Park where every July 7 citizens gather to pay their respects to Dane Trajkov.

== Gallery ==
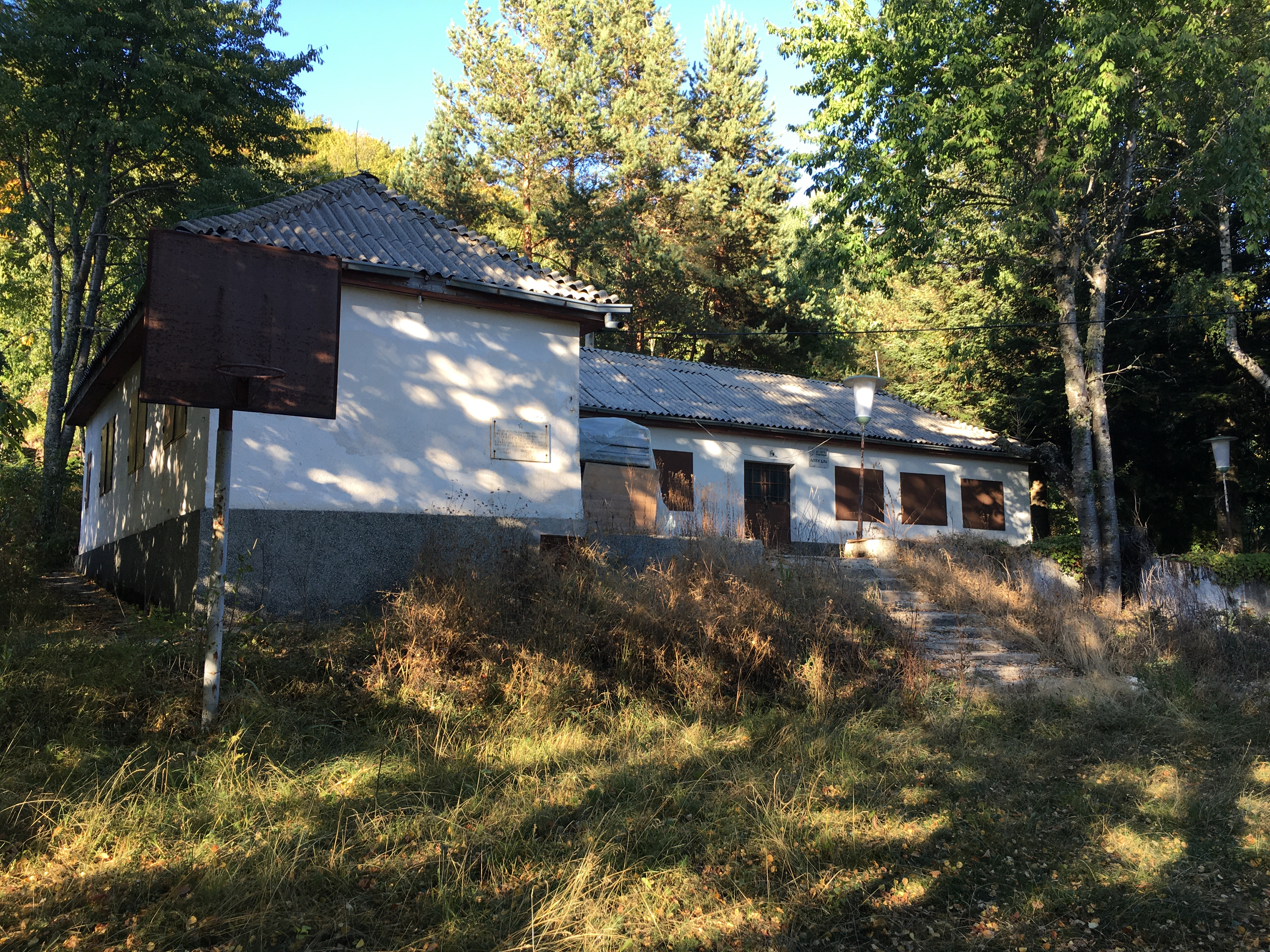
The Hospital building

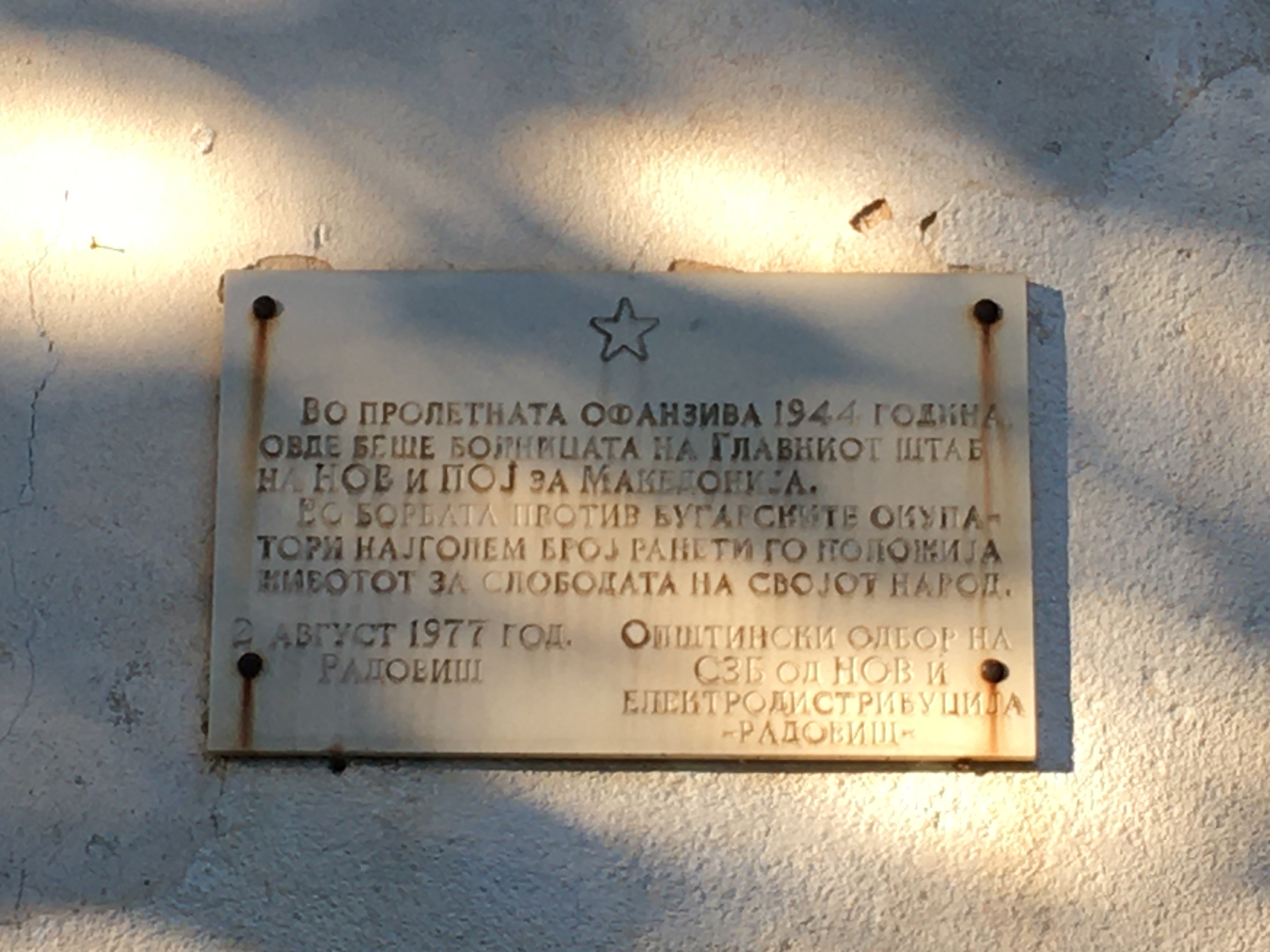
Commemorative plaque of the People's Liberation War (PLW) on the wall of the building

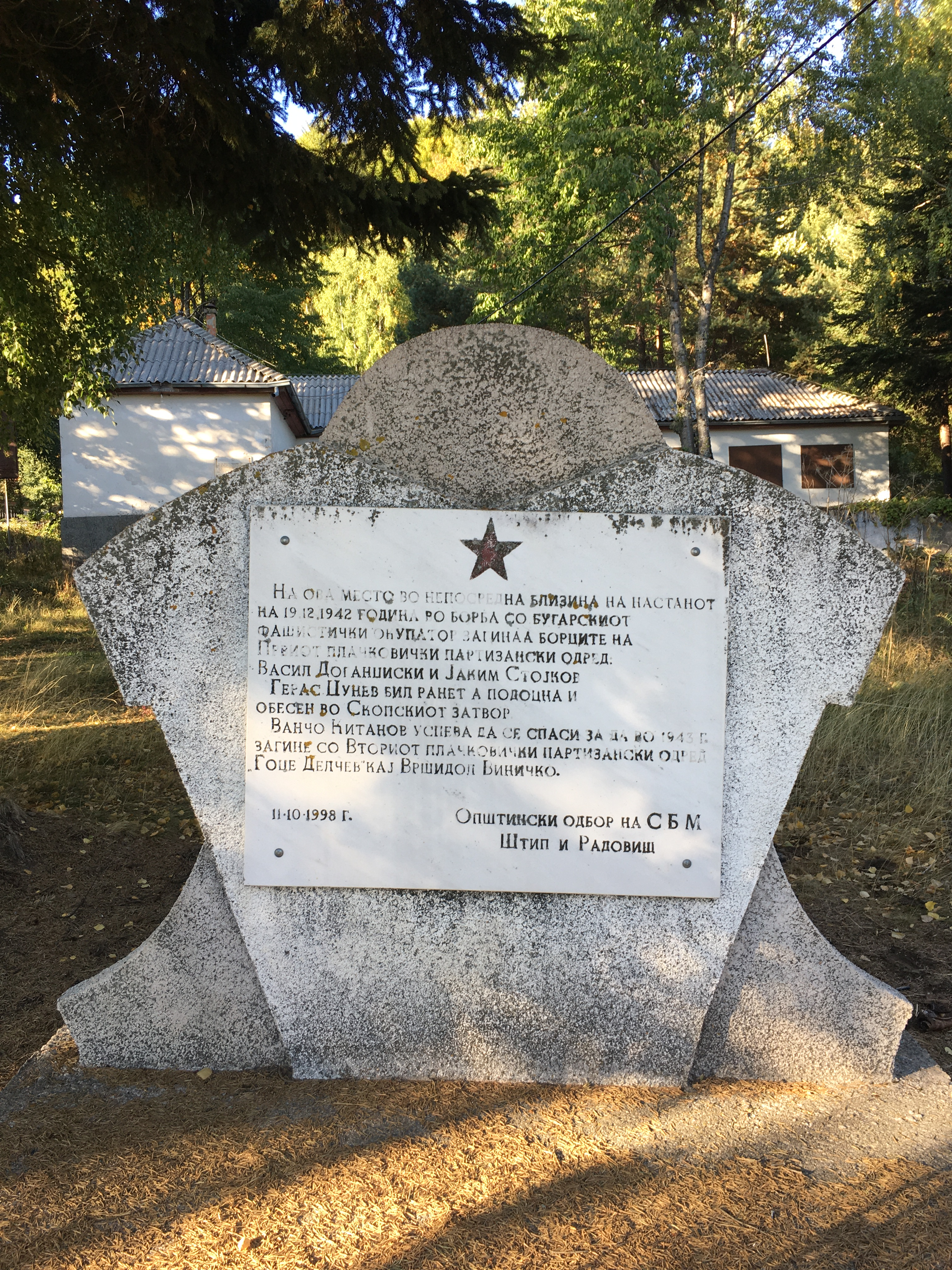
Monument of PLW in the hospital garden

== See also ==
- Šipkovica
- Plačkovica
- Spring Offensive
