= Edward M. Grosz =

Catholic bishop (born 1945)

His Excellency, The Most Reverend Edward Michael Grosz
- Auxiliaty Bishop emeritus of Buffalo; Titular Bishop of Morosbisdus
- Church: Roman Catholic Church
- Archdiocese: New York
- Diocese: Buffalo
- Appointed: November 22, 1989
- Installed: February 2, 1990
- Retired: March 2, 2020
- Other post: Titular Bishop of Morosbisdus

Orders
- Ordination: May 29, 1971 by James A. McNulty
- Consecration: February 2, 1990 by Edward D. Head, Bernard Joseph McLaughlin, and Donald Walter Trautman

Personal details
- Born: February 16, 1945 (age 81) Buffalo, New York, US
- Motto: Magnificat anima mea Dominum (My soul magnifies the Lord)

Styles of Edward Michael Grosz
- Reference style: His Excellency; The Most Reverend
- Spoken style: Your Excellency
- Religious style: Bishop

Edward Michael Grosz (born February 16, 1945) is an American prelate of the Roman Catholic Church who served as auxiliary bishop of the Diocese of Buffalo in New York from 1990 to 2020.

== Biography ==
=== Early life ===
Edward Grosz was born on February 16, 1945, in Buffalo, New York. He studied at Saint John Vianney Seminary in East Aurora, New York. Grosz attended Assumption School in Buffalo, then entered the diocesan Preparatory Seminary. He later attended St. John Vianney Seminary in East Aurora, receiving a Bachelor of Philosophy degree and a Master of Divinity degree.

=== Priesthood ===
Grosz was ordained a priest by Bishop James A. McNulty for the Diocese of Buffalo on May 29, 1971. He then entered the University of Notre Dame in South Bend, Indiana, receiving a Master of Theology degree.

Grosz first pastoral assignment was at Transfiguration Parish in Buffalo where he served as assistant pastor. He was later assigned to St. Luke and Blessed Trinity parishes in Buffalo. He also served at St. Joseph Cathedral in Buffalo. Grosz served as pastor at St. Philip the Apostle in Cheektowaga, New York, and at St. Stanislaus Kostka and Holy Trinity Parishes in Niagara Falls, New York.

=== Auxiliary Bishop of Buffalo ===
Grosz was appointed auxiliary bishop of the Diocese of Buffalo and titular bishop of Morosbisdus on November 22, 1989, by John Paul II. He was consecrated a bishop on February 2, 1990, by Bishop Edward Head.

Grosz was appointed episcopal vicar of the Western Niagara vicariate in 1996. He was appointed pastor of St. Stanislaus Parish in Buffalo and as episcopal vicar of the Southeast Buffalo vicariate in 2003. In 2004, after Bishop Henry J. Mansell was named archbishop of the Archdiocese of Hartford, Grosz was elected as diocesan administrator of Buffalo by the college of consultors.

=== Retirement and legacy ===
Grosz's letter of resignation as auxiliary bishop of Buffalo was accepted by Pope Francis on March 2, 2020. Grosz serves as chaplain to the western branch of the Polish National Alliance.

On November 23, 2020, New York Attorney General Letitia James filed a lawsuit against Grosz, the diocese and Bishop Richard J. Malone. The lawsuit claimed that they misused diocese funds to cover up alleged sexual abuse of minors by over two dozen priests. At the same time, James' office released a 218-page report detailing a two-year investigation of the diocese.

== Episcopal succession ==
Catholic Church titles
Preceded by James T. McHugh	Roman Catholic Titular See of Morosbisdus; 1990–present	Succeeded by Incumbent
