= Morodvis =

Morodvis Мородвис
- Village
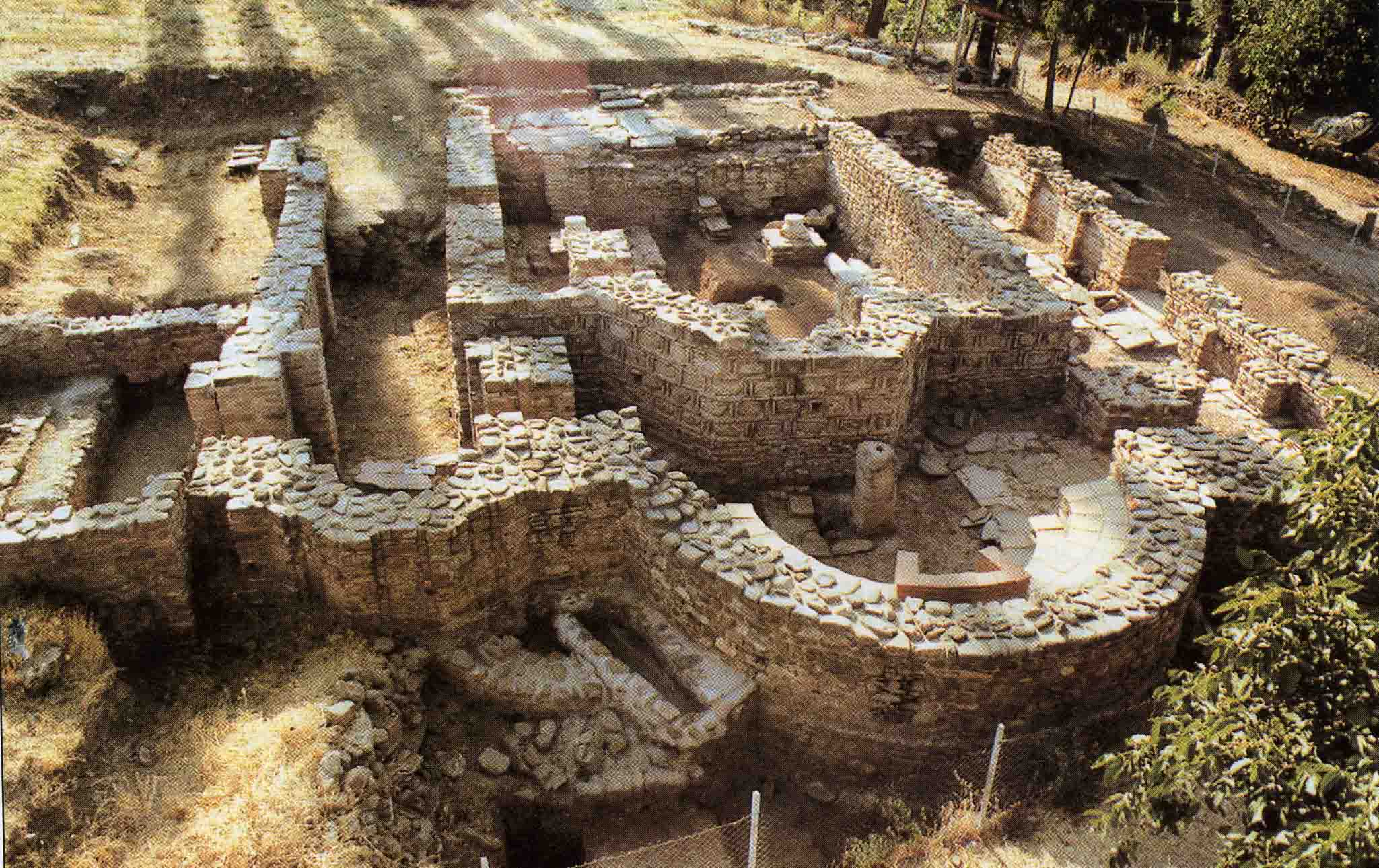
- Archaeological excavations at Morodvis

- Location within North Macedonia
- Coordinates: 41°51′15″N 22°26′30″E
- Country: North Macedonia
- Region: Eastern
- Municipality: Zrnovci

Government
  - Mayor: Blaže Stankov
- Elevation: 341 m (1,119 ft)

Population (2002)
  - Total: 549
- Time zone: UTC+1 (CET)
  - Summer (DST): UTC+2 (CEST)
- Postal code: 2305
- Vehicle registration: ŠT or KO

Morodvis is a village in Zrnovci municipality, located in the base of mountain Plačkovica, 7 kilometres (4.3 mi) south of Kočani, North Macedonia.

== History ==
The village is the site of Crkvište-Morobizdon, a complex archaeological site of late-antiquity and medieval significance.

The village was inhabited from the 5th to 7th centuries, when it was abandoned after the 7th century. A church dating from the 5th century was discovered on this location, with a tomb as its centre. With its marble flooring and pillars and capitals decorated with medieval motifs, it has been concluded that this church represents an example of a high technical level of construction and decoration.

In the 9th century, the Slavs settled in the area.

From the 10th to the 15th century, the settlement was a religious center of the Bregalnica region. Under the reign of Samuel it became a bishopric center in the framework of the Archbishopric of Ohrid. The prosperity of the city of the Morobizdon and Morodvis bishopric ended towards the end of the 12th century, when the Serbian church became dominant in the region.

A Romanesque church was also discovered, and it originates from this period. The church is an example of the medieval architectural concept, fresco-painted, with flooring made in sextuple technique and church furniture made of carved stone. During the 13th century, a new smaller church was built on the site of the older church, around which a necropolis was discovered, dating between the 12th and the 19th centuries, with more than 350 graves that contained artifacts made of gold, bronze, bone, glass and textile.

In 1347, as a result of a decision by the church council at its meeting held in Skopje, the headquarters of the bishopric was moved to Zletovo.

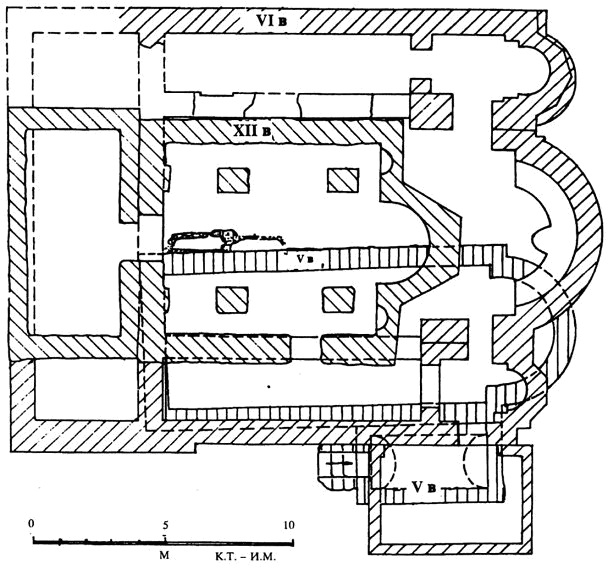
Map of the archaeological site of Morodvis

== Demographics ==
According to the 2002 census, the village had a total of 549 inhabitants. Ethnic groups in the village include:

- Macedonians 549
