= Zrnovci =

Zrnovci Зрновци
- village
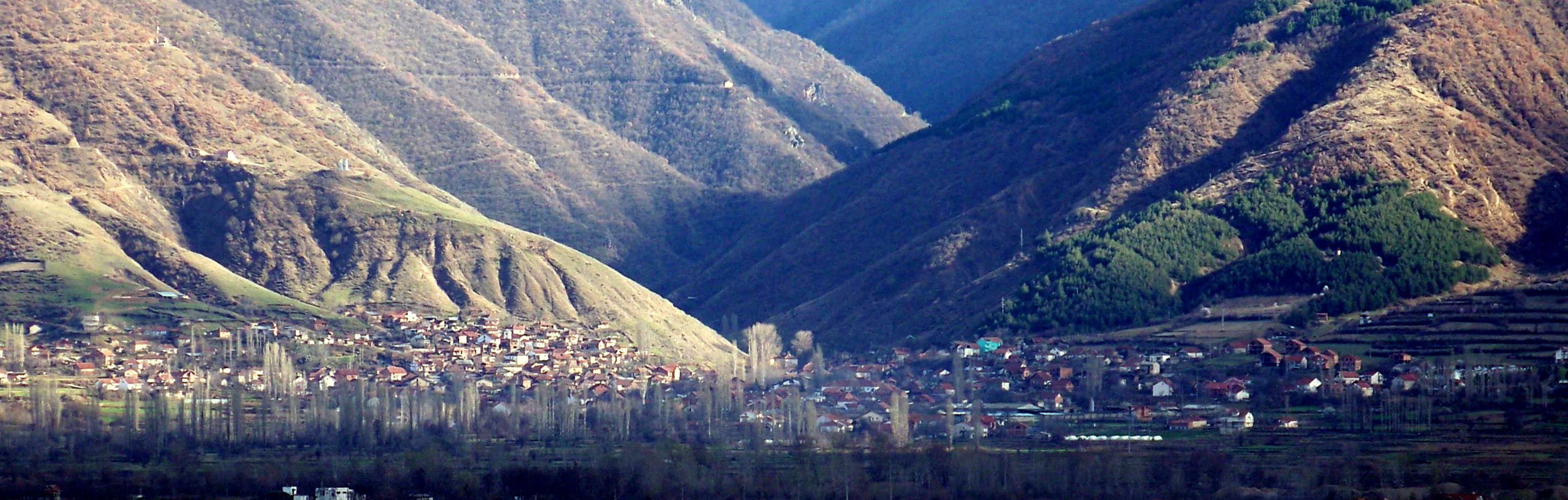
- Panoramic view of Zrnovci

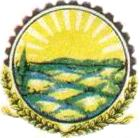
- Seal

- Location within North Macedonia
- Coordinates: 41°51′15″N 22°26′39″E
- Country: North Macedonia
- Region: Eastern
- Municipality: Zrnovci

Government
  - Mayor: Borco Kocev

Area
  - Total: 28.5 km^{2} (11.0 sq mi)
- Elevation: 345 m (1,132 ft)

Population
  - Total: 2,221
- Time zone: UTC+1 (CET)
  - Summer (DST): UTC+2 (CEST)
- Postal code: 2305
- Climate: Cfa
- Vehicle registration: KO
- Website: http://www.zrnovci.gov.mk

Zrnovci (Macedonian: Зрновци) is a village in North Macedonia. It is a seat of the Zrnovci municipality.

== Geography ==
Zrnovci is situated in the east part of North Macedonia, 8 km south of Kočani, placed in the Kočani valley, more precisely in the foot of the mountain Plačkovica, with an area of 2848 ha. 57% of the total area of Zrnovci is forest, whereas 32% arable land. The biggest part of the arable land is rice fields (the total yearly production of rice bulb is averagely 800 tons out of which 480 t belong to the community sector).

The river of Zrnovci goes through the village. The river itself is one of the more abundant tributaries of the river Bregalnica. On the river, there is a power station which has largely changed the natural water flow of the river as well as its environment (the living conditions) in it. The mouth area of the Zrnovska river is 38 km2, while its length is 24 km.

== Climate ==
The height of Zrnovci above sea level is 345 m and as a part of the valley of Kocani it is shielded against strong north winds coming from the mountain Osogovo, and against air breakthrough from the south, it is protected by the mountain Plačkovica. The parameters that illustrate the climate in this region are the following:

- the average yearly temperature is 13 °C
- the average half year relative humidity of the air is 71%
- the average yearly sum of rainfall is 547,9 mm

== Demographics ==
According to the 2002 census, the village had a total of 2,221 inhabitants. Ethnic groups in the village include:

- Macedonians 2,217
- Serbs 2
- Others 2

There are 2279 inhabitants in Zrnovci, 98% of which are ethnic Macedonians and Macedonian Orthodox Christians. 1137 people are able to work, 730 of which are unemployed. The profile of the education level is the following:

- 27% are with secondary education,
- 2% with higher professional education and
- 1% with university

The inhabitants are mainly agricultural producers who cultivate their fields; part of them keep domestic animals or have trade store or restaurants. The craft and the few small industrial objects give out an impression of town activities.
