= Vidovište =

Vidovište Видовиште
- Village
- Location within North Macedonia
- Coordinates: 41.844385°N 22.399193°E
- Country: North Macedonia
- Region: Eastern
- Municipality: Zrnovci

Population (2002)
  - Total: 494
- Time zone: UTC+1 (CET)
  - Summer (DST): UTC+2 (CEST)
- Website: .

Vidovište (Macedonian: Видовиште) is a village in the municipality of Zrnovci, North Macedonia.

== Demographics ==
According to the 2002 census, the village had a total of 494 inhabitants. Ethnic groups in the village include:

- Macedonians 481
- Aromanians 13
