= Kanal 8 =

Macedonian television channel

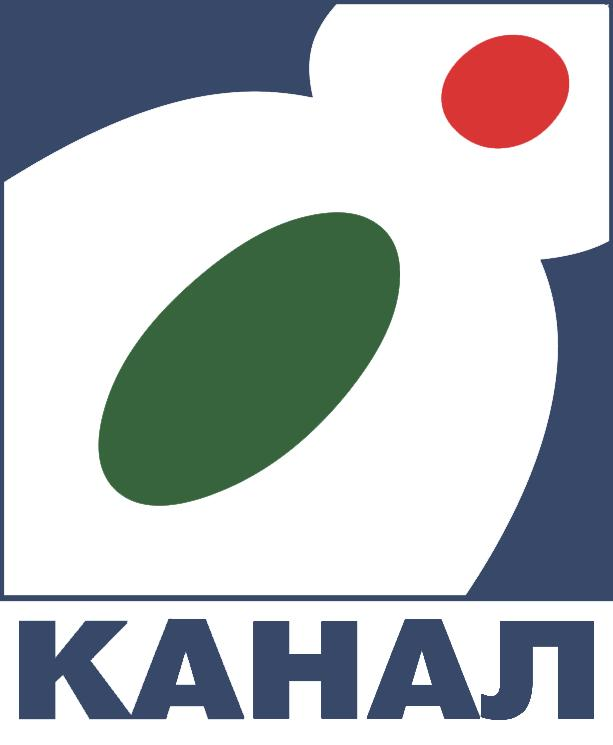
- Type: IPTV television channel and online radio station
- Country: Macedonia
- Availability: globally
- Headquarters: Kočani, Macedonia
- Owner: Toni Ajtovski
- Established: 2009
- Launch date: Television: 18 February 2009; 17 years ago; Radio: 1 April 2026; 6 months ago
- Picture format: 1080p (HDTV)
- Official website: www.kanal8.mk
- Language: Macedonian

Kanal 8 (Macedonian: Канал 8, transliteration: Kanal 8) is a regional television channel from Kočani, Macedonia. With news and information about current events, it covers the municipalities of Kočani, Vinica, Zrnovci and Češinovo - Obleševo.

== History ==
The license to perform broadcasting activities with the official name TRD Kanal 8 DOOEL was received by the Broadcasting Council of Macedonia on November 26, 2008, while it officially started operating on February 18, 2009, in the area of the Kočani region.

The program was broadcast on channel 46 in the UHF band, 24 hours a day. With the introduction of digital television transition in the country from June 1, 2013, the analog signal was switched off, and the program continued to be broadcast through cable operators in the four municipalities in the region.

The television program service is in Macedonian, with a predominantly general entertainment format.

By a decision of the Agency for Audio and Audiovisual Media Services (AAVMU) dated October 2, 2024, Kanal 8 was deleted from the register of broadcasters. The program continues to be broadcast as IPTV through several platforms, as well as on its own website via the TV link, thus turning from a regional medium into a global medium.

From April 1, 2026, TRD Kanal 8 DOOEL also began broadcasting an online radio program via the Radio link.
