= Viničko Kale =

Archaeological site in North Macedonia

Coordinates: 41°52′40″N 22°30′08″E

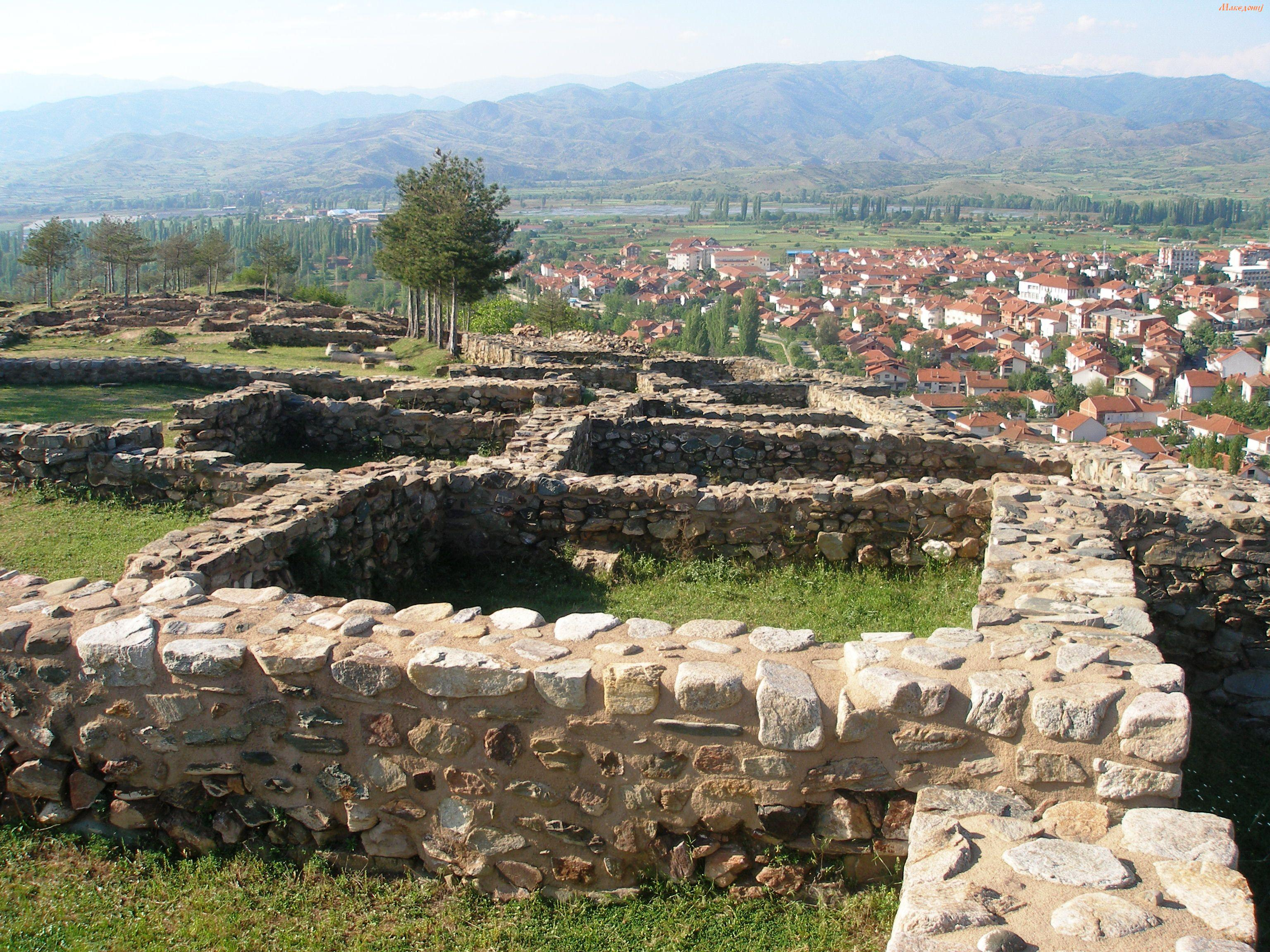
Viničko Kale ruins overlooking the town of Vinica

Viničko Kale (Macedonian: Виничко Кале) is an ancient ruin located on the hill above the town of Vinica, North Macedonia. It is located on the left side of the Grdečka River, on a hill about 400 meters above sea level. Viničko Kale was discovered in 1954. In 1978, 5 fragments of terra-cotta icons were discovered in Viničko Kale, which shows that it was inhabited from Neolithic times to the Middle Ages.

== See also ==
- List of castles in North Macedonia
