= Drugovo =

Drugovo Другово
- Village
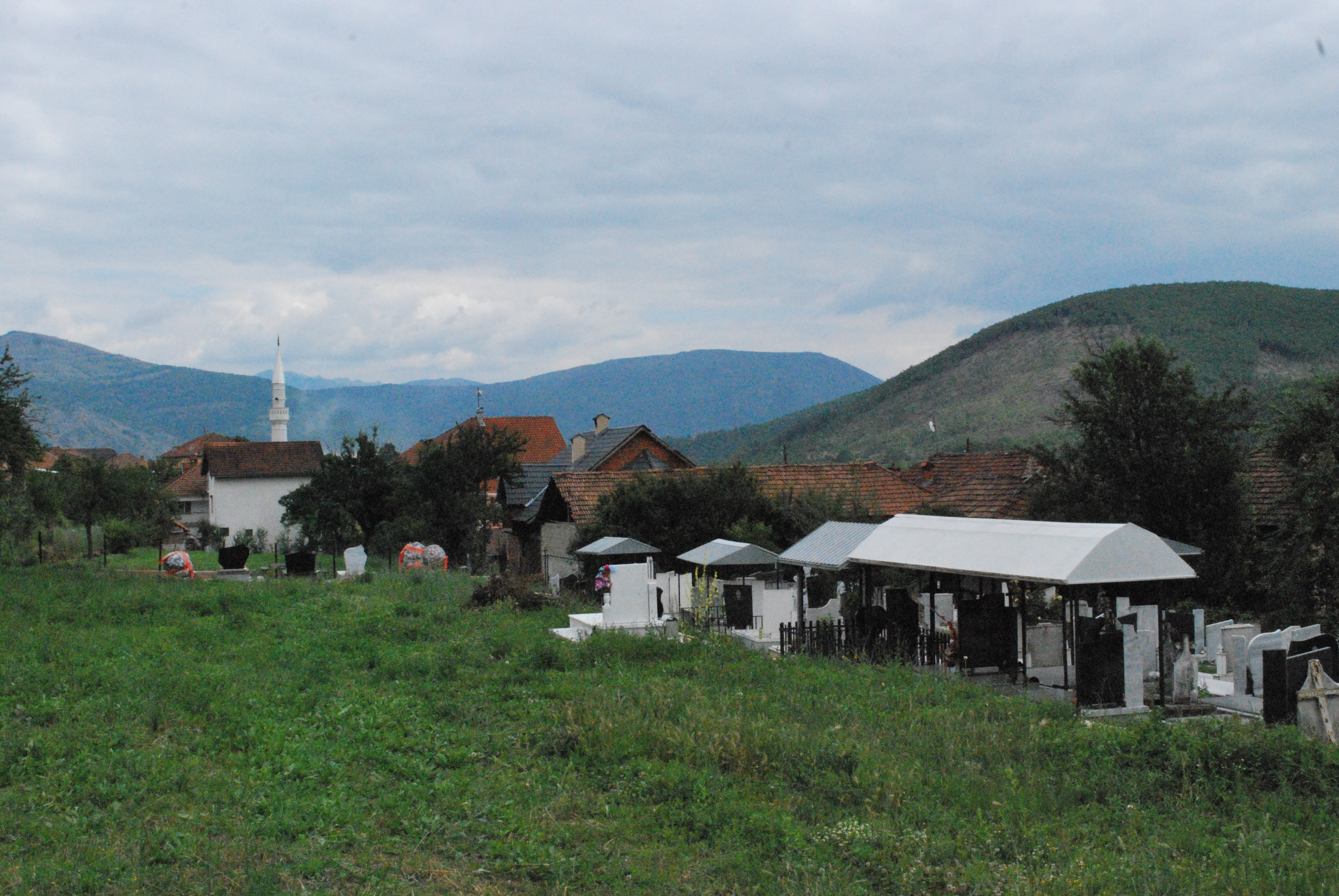
- View of Drugovo with village mosque in the background

- Location within North Macedonia
- Coordinates: 41°29′N 20°55′E
- Country: North Macedonia
- Region: Southwestern
- Municipality: Kičevo

Population (2021)
  - Total: 1,545
- Time zone: UTC+1 (CET)
  - Summer (DST): UTC+2 (CEST)
- Car plates: KI
- Website: .

Drugovo (Macedonian: Другово) is a village in the municipality of Kičevo, North Macedonia. It was the seat of the now-defunct Drugovo Municipality.

== History ==
After the capture of the village by Partisan forces, 24 Albanian men were executed by the incoming communist forces, with the pretext of cooperating with Fascisct forces.

== Demographics ==
In statistics gathered by Vasil Kanchov in 1900, the village of Drugovo was inhabited by 260 Muslim Albanians.

According to the 1942 Albanian census, Drugovo was inhabited by a total of 588 people, 537 of whom were Muslim Albanians and 51 Bulgarians.

The Yugoslav census of 1948 recorded 537 people of whom 478 were Albanians and 59 Macedonians. The Yugoslav census of 1953 recorded 610 people of whom 358 were Turks, 179 Albanians, 70 Macedonians and 3 others. The 1961 Yugoslav census recorded 606 people of whom 412 were Macedonians, 141 Turks, 46 Albanians and 7 others. The 1971 census recorded 944 people of whom 764 were Macedonians, 151 Turks, 19 Albanians and 13 others. The 1981 Yugoslav census recorded 1291 people of whom 1046 were Macedonians, 149 Turks, 55 Bosniaks, 32 Albanians and 9 others.

The Macedonian census of 1994 recorded 1398 people of whom 1171 were Macedonians, 153 Turks, 61 Albanians and 13 others.

According to the 2002 census, the village had a total of 1,492 inhabitants. Ethnic groups in the village include:

- Macedonians 1,250
- Albanians 108
- Turks 128
- Romani 1
- Serbs 2
- Others 3

As of the 2021 census, Drugovo had 1,545 residents with the following ethnic composition:

- Macedonians 1,276
- Turks 122
- Albanians 81
- Persons for whom data are taken from administrative sources 60
- Others 6
