= Vinica, North Macedonia =

Vinica Виница (Macedonian)
- Town
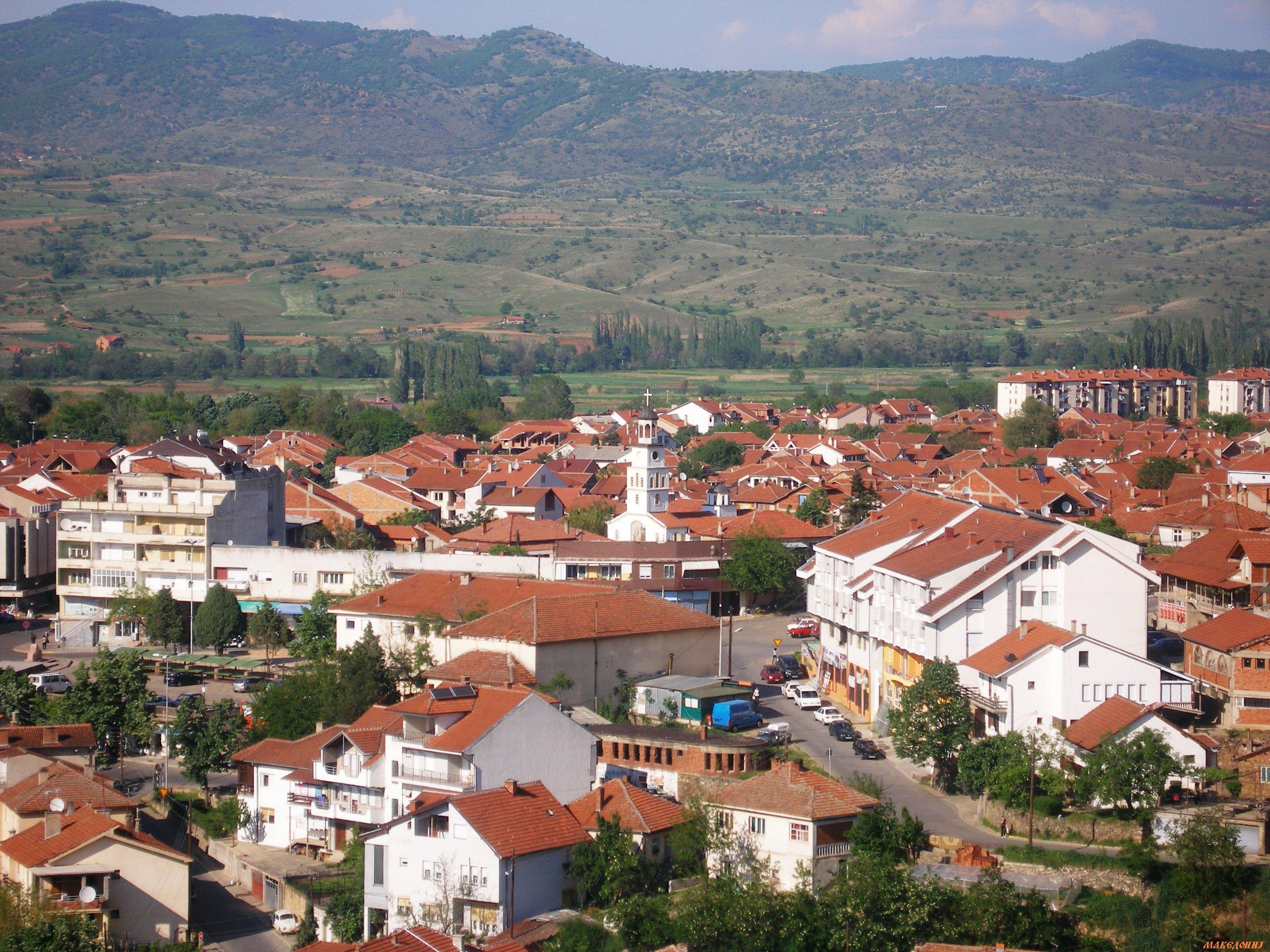
- Vinica

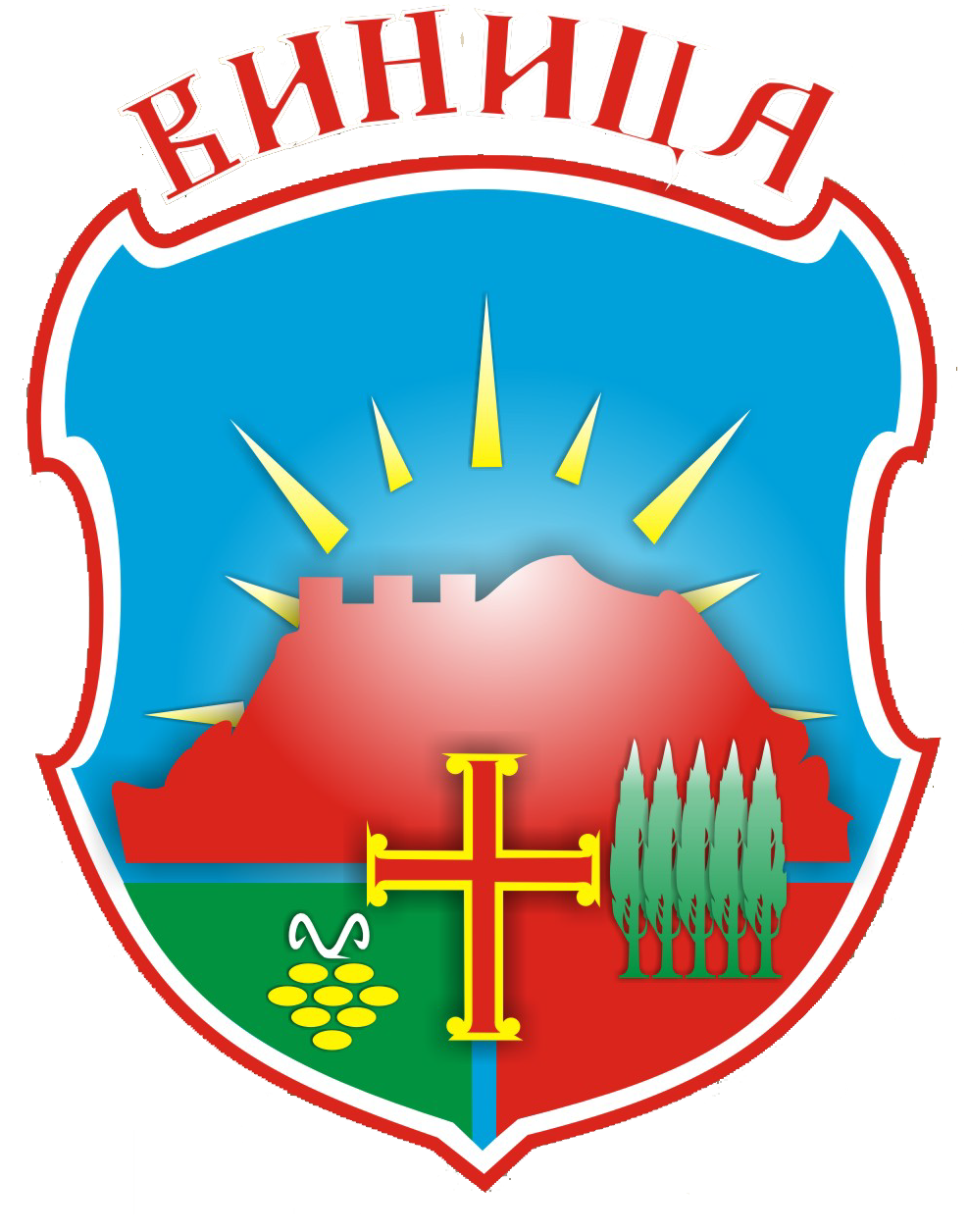
- Flag Seal

- Location within North Macedonia
- Coordinates: 41°52′N 22°30′E
- Country: North Macedonia
- Region: Eastern
- Municipality: Vinica

Government
  - Mayor: Mitko Kostadinovski(VMRO-DPMNE)
- Highest elevation: 1,745 m (5,725 ft)
- Lowest elevation: 360 m (1,180 ft)

Population (2002)
  - Total: 10,863
- Time zone: UTC+1 (CET)
  - Summer (DST): UTC+2 (CEST)
- Postal code: 2310
- Area code: +389 033
- Vehicle registration: VI
- Climate: Cfa
- Website: www.OpstinaVinica.gov.mk/

Vinica (Macedonian: Виница [ˈvinitsa]) is a town in North Macedonia, in the Eastern Statistical Region of the country. The town of Vinica is the seat of Vinica Municipality.

The town is located under the mountain of Plačkovica, in the southeastern part of the Kočani Valley. It covers the northern part of the river Bregalnica sinks. There are also several other rivers that flow through Vinica, like the Vinička, Gradečka and Osojnica. The town is known for its historic Roman fortress, Viničko Kale, situated on a hill overlooking the modern town.

== Etymology ==
The name Vinica is derived from word vine, since the city was formerly noted for its vineyards. On terracotta icons found in Viničko Kale, the name of town is noted as Vinea or Vince.

== History ==
=== Neolithic times ===
The territory of Vinica was inhabited in Neolithic times. More recent evidence of habitation comes from findings on Viničko Kale from the 6th to the 12th century AD.

=== Byzantine Empire ===
The original settlement was a fort from the time of Byzantium, when it was a centre of wine production.

=== Ottoman Empire ===
The city was a nahiye and was governed by a Kaymakam of the Ottoman Empire between the 14th and 20th centuries.

=== Yugoslavia time ===
Before 1980, on the hill where the fortress was found, there were many vineyards, which were abandoned after excavations.

== Demographics ==
As of 2002, the town had 10,863 inhabitants and the ethnic composition was the following:

- Macedonians 9,706 (89.84%)
- Roma 809 (7.49%)
- Turks 216 (1.99%)
- Aromanians 101 (0.93%)
- Others 31

== Culture ==
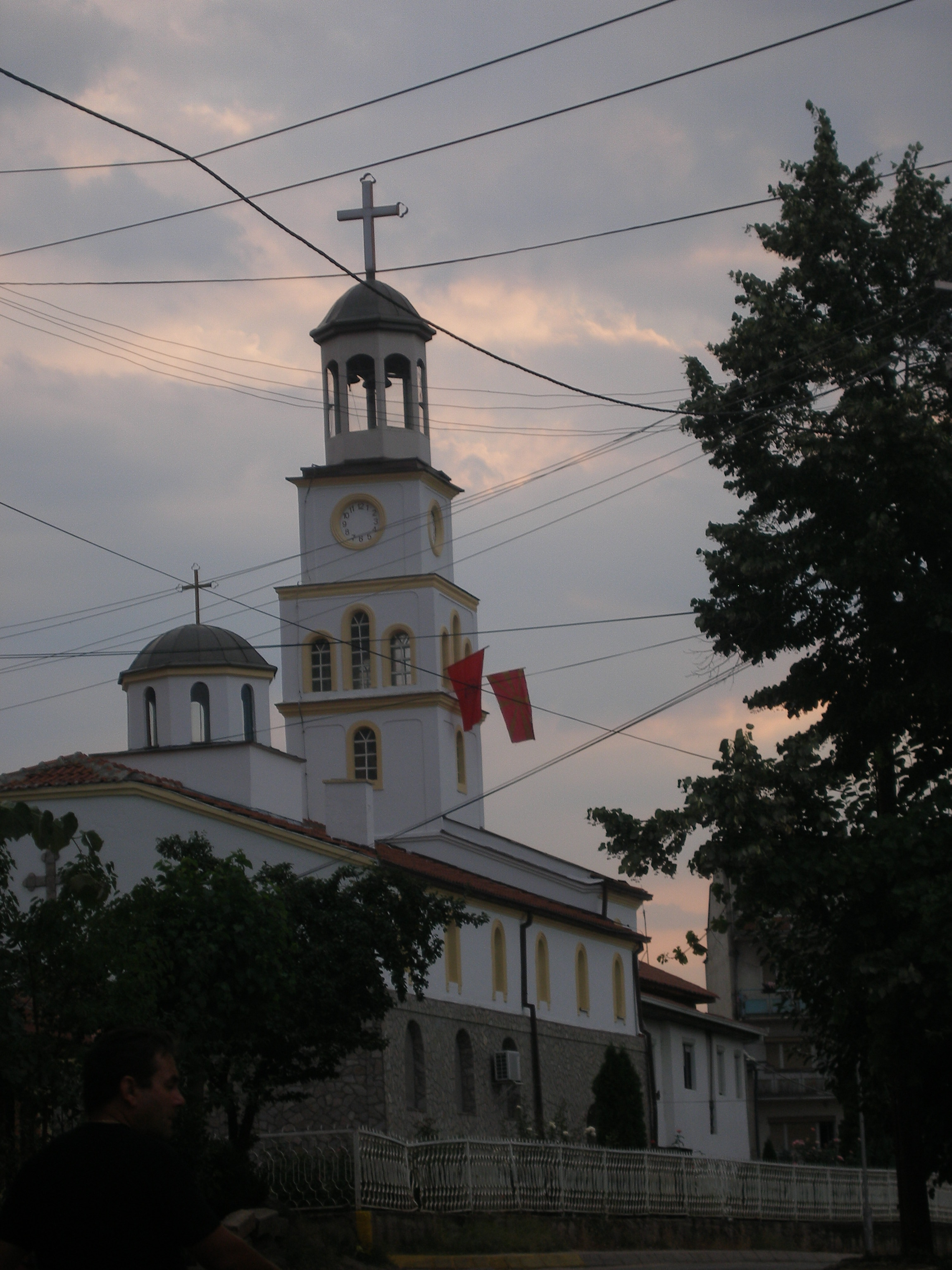
Town church in old part of Vinica

In Vinica, there are two primary schools Goce Delčev and Slavčo Stojmenski, one high school and city library Vančo Prke which was founded in 1946, there is also a cinema and a house of culture, Tošo Arsov, which is a centre of all cultural activities. The town has two folk music groups, Raspeani Viničani and Jana, and one folklore group Kitka.

There are several archaeological sites in and around Vinica:

- Vinica, medieval settlement
- Pazarište, settlement from Roman times
- Vinica Fortress, fortified settlement from late ancient times
- Gorica, settlement and early Christian basilica from late ancient times
- Ila, necropolis from the Iron Age

== Economy ==
Vinica

One of the major activities in Vinica is agriculture. Farmers engage in the production of rice, which is very characteristic of the basin in which Vinica is located. The town also has industrial activities, among which is the best represented the textiles and wood furniture production industry. The major companies are: Makprogres, Viničanka, Vinka, Triko, Treska and Mebel-Vi. The city has many shops, bars, restaurants, two night clubs, and three major hotels, which are offering a broader range of services.

== Sport and leisure ==
The leading sport in Vinica is association football. The town formed its first football club in 1934 called Plačkovica, later renamed Sloga Vinica, now FK Sloga 1934 Vinica. There is also a basketball club Slavčo Stojmenski, a karate club Blatec and a badminton club Viničani.
