= FK Dolno Konjari =

- Full name: Fudbalski klub Dolno Konjari
- Founded: 2013; 12 years ago
- Ground: Stadion Konjari
- Chairman: Ćamil Osmanović
- Manager: Ervin Terzić
- League: OFS Gazi Baba
- 2023–24: 5th

FK Dolno Konjari (Macedonian: ФК Долно Коњари; Bosnian: FK Donje Konjare) is a football club of the Bosniak community based in the village of Dolno Konjari near Skopje, North Macedonia. They currently play in the OFS Gazi Baba league.

== History ==
The club was founded in 2013.
