= Petrovac (Lebane) =

Petrovac Петровац (Serbian)
- Village
- Location within Serbia
- Coordinates: 42°56′26″N 21°33′55″E
- Country: Serbia
- District: Jablanica District
- Municipality: Lebane

Population (2002)
  - Total: 47
- Time zone: UTC+1 (CET)
  - Summer (DST): UTC+2 (CEST)

Petrovac is a village in the municipality of Lebane, Serbia. According to the 2002 census, the village has a population of 47 people.
