= Ilinden (village) =

Ilinden Илинден
- Town
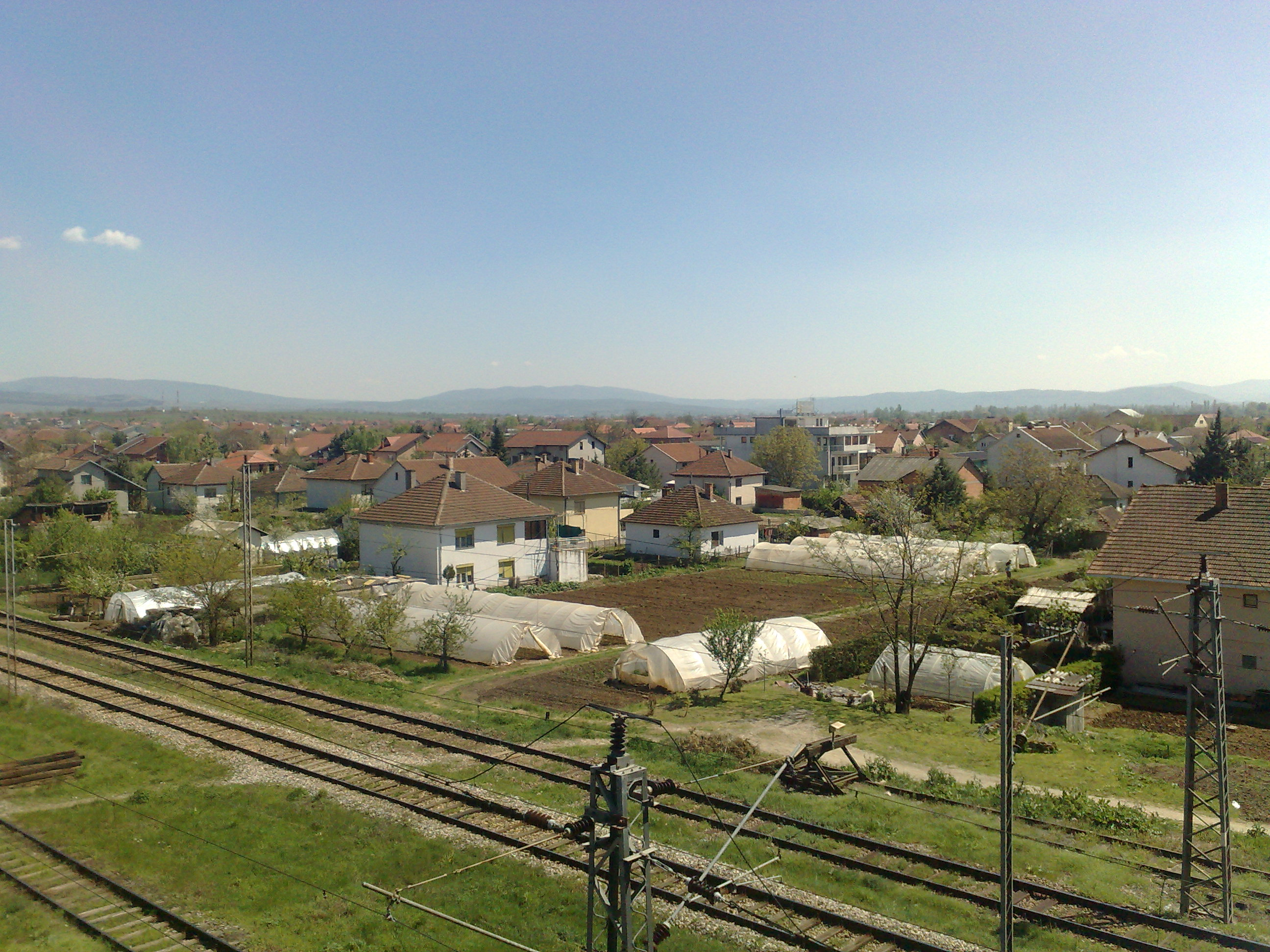
- A photo of a part of the railway and the houses near it

- Location within North Macedonia
- Coordinates: 42°00′N 21°35′E
- Country: North Macedonia
- Municipality: Ilinden municipality
- Statistical region: Skopje Statistical Region

Government

Population (2021)
  - Total: 5,161
- Time zone: UTC+1 (CET)
  - Summer (DST): UTC+2 (CEST)
- Vehicle registration: SK
- Website: .

Ilinden (Macedonian: Илинден) is a town in North Macedonia. It is a seat of the Ilinden Municipality. It is also very commonly referred by its old name Belimbegovo, in spite of the fact that the name was changed in 1951.

== Demographics ==
As of the 2021 census, Ilinden had 5,161 residents with the following ethnic composition:

- Macedonians 4,230
- Persons for whom data are taken from administrative sources 414
- Albanians 326
- Serbs 111
- Others 59
- Roma 21

According to the 2002 census, the settlement had a total of 4931 inhabitants. Ethnic groups in the suburb include:

- Macedonians 4285
- Albanians 340
- Serbs 176
- Romani 31
- Turks 2
- Vlachs 1
- Others 96

== See also ==
- Ilinden - important historic date
- Ilinden Municipality
