= Petrovac (Prokuplje) =

Petrovac Петровац (Serbian)
- Village
- Location within Serbia
- Coordinates: 43°19′14″N 21°34′47″E
- Country: Serbia
- District: Toplica District
- Municipality: Prokuplje

Population (2002)
  - Total: 436
- Time zone: UTC+1 (CET)
  - Summer (DST): UTC+2 (CEST)

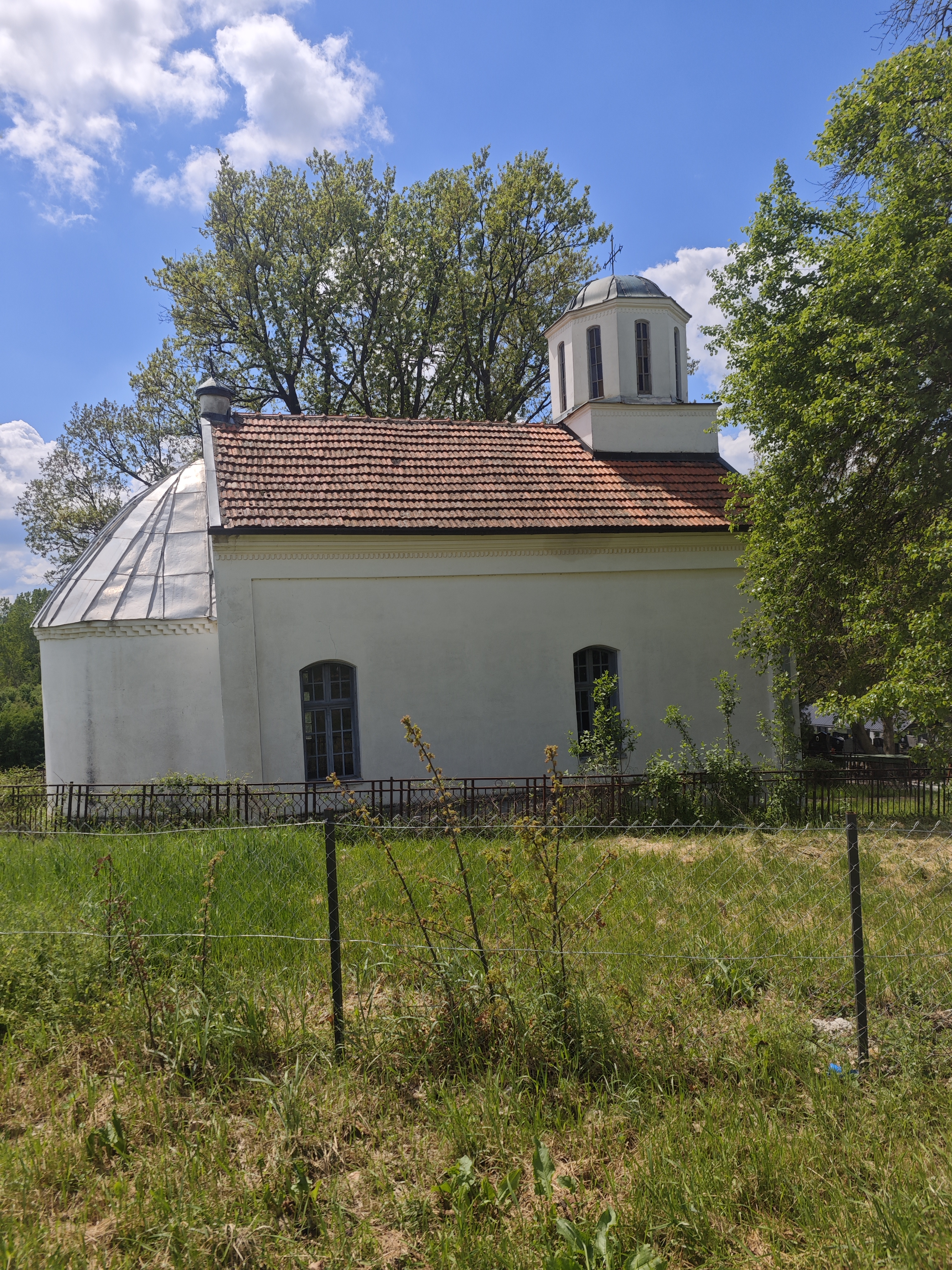
Church of Petrovac, Prokuplje

Petrovac is a village in the municipality of Prokuplje, Toplica District, Serbia. According to the 2002 census, the village has a population of 436 people.
