= Petrovec, North Macedonia =

Petrovec Петровец
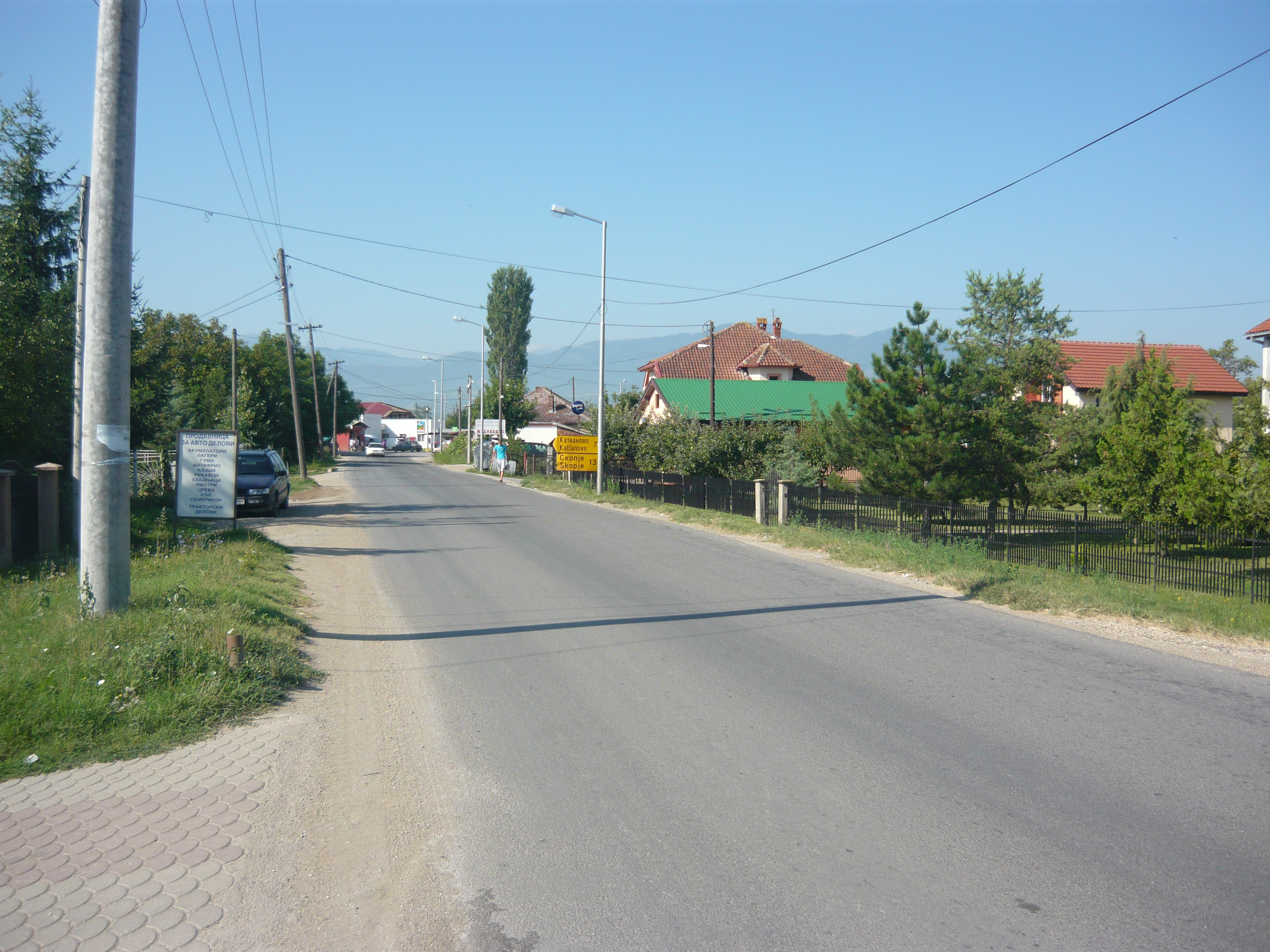
- Petrovec

- Location within North Macedonia
- Coordinates: 41°56′N 21°37′E
- Country: North Macedonia
- Region: Skopje
- Municipality: Petrovec

Population (2021)
  - Total: 3,132
- Time zone: UTC+1 (CET)
  - Summer (DST): UTC+2 (CEST)
- Vehicle registration: SK
- Website: .

Petrovec (Macedonian: Петровец) is a village in the municipality of Petrovec, North Macedonia and situated about 15 km southeast of the national capital Skopje. It is the seat of the Petrovec municipality. Though rather small, the village is known throughout the country as being the nearest settlement to Skopje International Airport, the bigger of two international airports in North Macedonia (for this, Petrovec had previously been the name of the airport).

== Demographics ==
As of the 2021 census, Petrovec had 3,132 residents with the following ethnic composition:

- Macedonians 2,637
- Bosniaks 164
- Persons for whom data are taken from administrative sources 136
- Serbs 99
- Albanians 83
- Others 13

According to the 2002 census, the village had a total of 2,659 inhabitants. Ethnic groups in the village include:

- Macedonians 2,312
- Bosniaks 118
- Serbs 99
- Albanians 67
- Romani 53
- Others 10

== Sports ==
Local football club FK Petrovec plays in the Macedonian Third League (North Division).
