= Zrnovci Municipality =

Municipality of North Macedonia

Municipality of Zrnovci Општина Зрновци
- Rural municipality
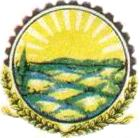
- Flag Coat of arms

- Coordinates: 41.85°N 22.45°E
- Country: North Macedonia
- Region: Eastern
- Municipal seat: Zrnovci

Government
  - Mayor: Borčo Kocev (VMRO-DPMNE)

Area
  - Total: 55.82 km^{2} (21.55 sq mi)

Population
  - Total: 2,086
  - Density: 58.47/km^{2} (151.4/sq mi)
- Time zone: UTC+1 (CET)
- Postal code: 2305
- Area code: 033
- Vehicle registration: KO
- Website: www.zrnovci.gov.mk

Zrnovci (Macedonian: Зрновци) is a municipality in the eastern part of North Macedonia. Zrnovci is also the name of the village where the municipal seat is located. The Zrnovci Municipality is part of the Eastern Statistical Region.

== Geography ==
The municipality borders the Vinica Municipality to the east, the Kočani Municipality to the north, the Češinovo-Obleševo Municipality to the west, and the Karbinci Municipality to the south.

== Demographics ==
According to the 2002 census, the Zrnovci Municipality has 3,264 residents. According to the 2021 North Macedonia census, this municipality has 2,086 inhabitants. Ethnic groups in the municipality:

	2002		2021	
	Number	%	Number	%
TOTAL	3,264	100	2,086	100
Macedonians	3,247	99.48	1,985	95.16
Vlachs	13	0.4	3	0.14
Albanians			2	0.1
Serbs	2	0.06	2	0.1
Other / Undeclared / Unknown	2	0.06	14	0.66
Persons for whom data are taken from administrative sources			80	3.84

Demographics of the Zrnovci Municipality
Census year	Population
1994	/
2002	3,264
2021	2,086

== Inhabited places ==
The number of inhabited places in the municipality is 3.

- Morodvis
- Vidovište
- Zrnovci
