= Plačkovica =

Mountain in North Macedonia

Coordinates: 41°46′N 22°32′E

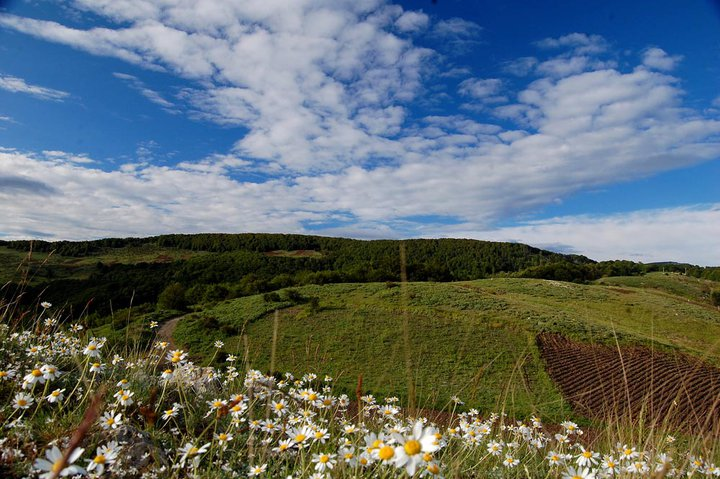
Plačkovica

Plačkovica (Macedonian: Плачковица) is a mountain located in the eastern part of North Macedonia, it extends between the cities of Radoviš, and Vinica.

The highest peak is Lisec (Macedonian: Лисец) at 1,754 m, the length of main valley slopes of the peak Lisec is 34 km. The valley of Zrnovska river splits the mountain in two, eastern and western parts. The peak of the western part is Turtel at 1,689 m. Lisec is a popular climbing route for the local climbers, being one of the harder peaks to scale in this part of Macedonia. It is not unusual to have snow on the peak during the month of June. The peak is served by two mountain lodges: Vrteška from Štip's side and, Dzumaja from Radoviš's side.

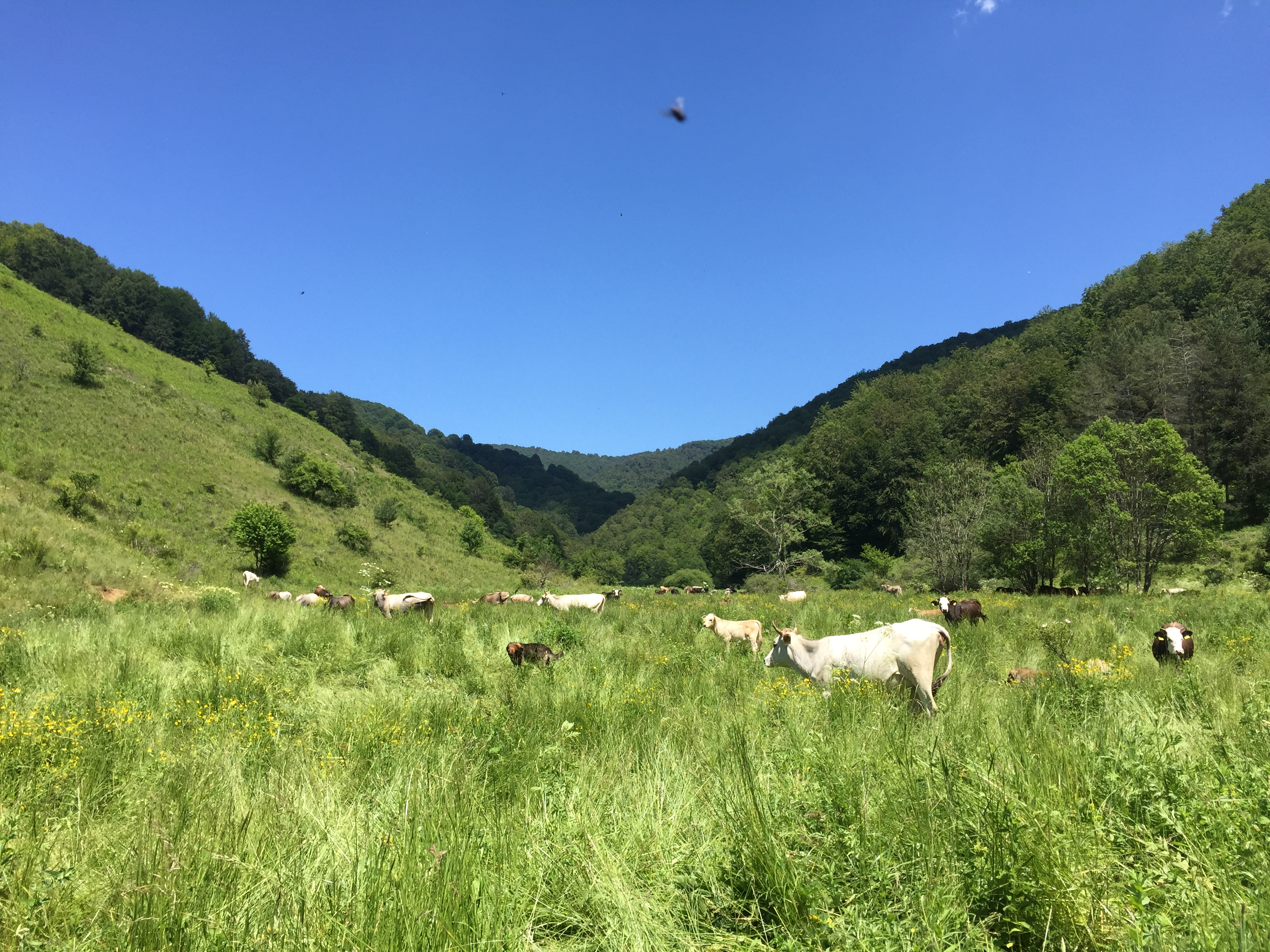
Plackovica mountain valley below the highest peak Lisec

Geological components of Plačkovica are mainly granite and marble.

== Name ==
The ancient name of Mount Plačkovica is believed to have been Pangaium (or Pangaeum). This name is thought to be of Thracian origin, and the mountain was referenced in historical sources from the classical period. The region around the mountain has been inhabited since ancient times, with evidence of Thracian, Paeonian, and other ancient cultures. The name "Pangaium" connects Plačkovica to broader historical and cultural contexts in the ancient Balkans.
