= Petrovec Municipality =

Municipality of North Macedonia

Coordinates: 41°56′20″N 21°36′54″E

Petrovec Municipality Општина Петровец
- Rural municipality
- Flag

- Country: North Macedonia
- Region: Skopje
- Municipal seat: Petrovec

Government
  - Mayor: Borče Mitevski (VMRO-DPMNE)

Area
  - Total: 201.93 km^{2} (77.97 sq mi)

Population
  - Total: 9,150
  - Density: 40.88/km^{2} (105.9/sq mi)
- Time zone: UTC+1 (CET)
- Postal code: 1043
- Area code: 031
- Vehicle registration: SK
- Website: http://www.opstina-petrovec.gov.mk

Petrovec Municipality (Macedonian: Петровец) is a municipality in northern North Macedonia, near the capital Skopje. Petrovec is also the name of the village where the municipal seat is found. It is located in the Skopje Statistical Region.

Skopje International Airport is located in the Petrovec municipality.

== Geography ==
The municipality borders with Studeničani Municipality and Zelenikovo Municipality to the west, Ilinden Municipality and Kumanovo Municipality to the north, Sveti Nikole Municipality to the east, and Veles Municipality to the south.

== Demographics ==
According to the 2021 North Macedonia census, Petrovec Municipality has 9,150 residents. Ethnic groups in the municipality:

| | 2002 | | 2021 | |
| | Number | % | Number | % |
| TOTAL | 8,255 | 100 | 9,150 | 100 |
| Macedonians | 4,246 | 51,44 | 4,609 | 50.37 |
| Bosniaks | 1,442 | 17.47 | 1,701 | 18.59 |
| Albanians | 1,887 | 22.86 | 1,676 | 18.32 |
| Serbs | 415 | 5.03 | 327 | 3.57 |
| Turks | 75 | 0.91 | 116 | 1.27 |
| Roma | 134 | 1.62 | 54 | 0.54 |
| Vlachs | | | 2 | 0.02 |
| Other / Undeclared / Unknown | 56 | 0.67 | 65 | 0.71 |
| Persons for whom data are taken from administrative sources | | | 600 | 6.56 |

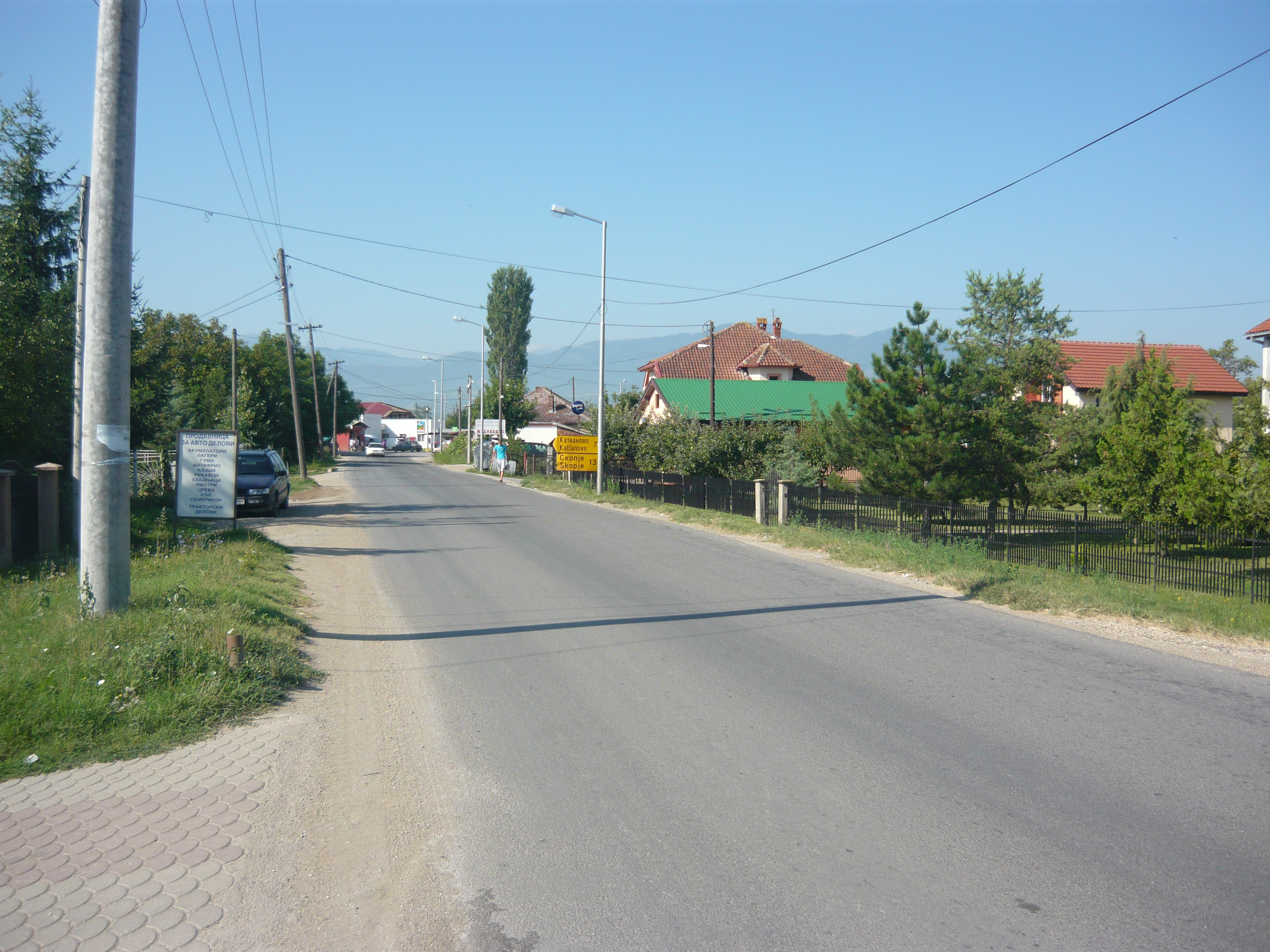
The village of Petrovec, seat of the municipality

| Demographics of Petrovec Municipality |
| Census year | Population |
|---|---|
| 1994 | 8,123 |
| 2002 | 8,255 |
| 2021 | 9,150 |
