= Ilinden Municipality =

Municipality of North Macedonia

Coordinates: 41.99°N 21.58°E

Municipality of Ilinden Општина Илинден
- Suburban municipality
- Flag Coat of arms

- Country: North Macedonia
- Region: Skopje
- Municipal seat: Ilinden

Government
  - Mayor: Aleksandar Georgievski (VMRO-DPMNE)

Area
  - Total: 97.02 km^{2} (37.46 sq mi)

Population
  - Total: 17,435
  - Density: 163.82/km^{2} (424.3/sq mi)
- Time zone: UTC+1 (CET)
- Postal code: 1041
- Area code: 02
- Vehicle registration: SK
- Website: http://www.Ilinden.gov.mk

Ilinden (Macedonian: Илинден) is a municipality part of North Macedonia. Ilinden is also the name of the town where the municipal seat is found. It is named after the Ilinden Uprising in the region of Macedonia in 1903. It is located in the Skopje Statistical Region.

== Geography ==
The municipality borders Aračinovo Municipality to the north, Petrovec Municipality to the south, the City of Skopje: (Gazi Baba Municipality) to the west, and Kumanovo Municipality to the east.

== Demographics ==
At the census in 1994 it had 14,512 inhabitants. The total population of the municipality according to the 2021 North Macedonia census is 17,435. Ethnic groups in the municipality:

	2002		2021	
	Number	%	Number	%
TOTAL	15,894	100	17,435	100
Macedonians	13,959	87.83	14,758	84.65
Serbs	912	5.74	628	3.6
Roma	428	2.69	476	2.73
Albanians	352	2.21	367	2.1
Vlachs	1	0.01	8	0.04
Bosniaks			8	0.04
Turks	17	0.11	4	0.02
Other / Undeclared / Unknown	225	1.41	136	0.8
Persons for whom data are taken from administrative sources			1,050	6.02

Demographics of Ilinden Municipality
Census year	Population
1994	14,512
2002	15,894
2021	17,435
