= Veles Municipality =

Municipality of North Macedonia

Coordinates: 41.73°N 21.78°E

Municipality of Veles Општина Велес
- Urban municipality
- Flag Coat of arms

- Country: North Macedonia
- Region: Vardar
- Municipal seat: Veles

Government
  - Mayor: Marko Kolev (VMRO-DPMNE)

Area
  - Total: 427.45 km^{2} (165.04 sq mi)

Population
  - Total: 48,463
  - Density: 128.92/km^{2} (333.9/sq mi)
- Time zone: UTC+1 (CET)
- Postal code: 1400
- Area code: 043
- Vehicle registration: VE
- Website: http://www.Veles.gov.mk

Veles (Macedonian: Велес [ˈvɛːlɛs]) is a municipality in central part of North Macedonia. Veles is also the name of the city where the municipal seat is found. Veles Municipality is part of the Vardar Statistical Region.

== Geography ==
The municipality borders Čaška Municipality and Zelenikovo Municipality to the west, Petrovec Municipality to the north, and Gradsko, Lozovo, and Sveti Nikole municipalities to the east. There are 28 populated locations, one town and 27 villages.

== Demographics ==
According to the 2021 North Macedonia census, this municipality had 48,463 inhabitants. At the census of 1994, it had 56,571 inhabitants.

	2002		2021	
	Number	%	Number	%
TOTAL	55,108	100	48,463	100
Macedonians	46,767	84.86	36,825	75.99
Albanians	2,299	4.17	2,736	5.65
Bosniaks	2,406	4.37	1,825	3.77
Turks	1,724	3.13	1,037	2.14
Roma	800	1.45	507	1.05
Vlachs	343	0.62	270	0.55
Serbs	540	0.98	267	0.55
Other / Undeclared / Unknown	229	0.42	278	0.56
Persons for whom data are taken from administrative sources			4,718	9.74

Religious affiliation according to the 2002 Macedonia census and 2021 North Macedonia census:

	2002		2021	
	Number	%	Number	%
TOTAL	46,843	100	48,463	100
Orthodox	7,096	85.0	24,107	76.8
Christians / Protestants	6	0.01	13,058	76.8
Catholics	67	0.12	50	76.8
Islam	7,344	13.3	6,286	13.0
Others	848	1.54	244	0.50
Persons for whom data are taken from administrative sources	n/a	n/a	4,718	9.74
