= Municipalities of North Macedonia =

First-order administrative division type in North Macedonia

Municipalities of North Macedonia Општини во Северна Македонија Komunat e Maqedonisë së Veriut
- Municipalities of North Macedonia
- Category: Unitary state
- Location: North Macedonia
- Number: 80
- Populations: 2,086 (Zrnovci) — 98,104 (Kumanovo)
- Areas: 3 km^{2} (1.2 sq mi) (Čair) — 1,198 km^{2} (463 sq mi) (Prilep)
- Government: Municipal assembly
- Subdivisions: Settlements

North Macedonia is currently organized into 80 municipalities (Macedonian: општини, Albanian: komunat; singular: Macedonian: општина, Albanian: komuna), established in February 2013; 10 of the municipalities constitute the City of Skopje (or Greater Skopje), a distinct unit of local self-governance and the country's capital.

Most of the current municipalities were unaltered or merely amalgamated from the previous 123 municipalities established in September 1996; others were consolidated and their borders changed. Prior to this, local governments were organized into 34 administrative districts, communes, or counties (also opštini / komunat). In 2004 they were reduced to 84, and in 2013, the following municipalities were merged into the Kičevo Municipality: Drugovo, Zajas, Oslomej and Vraneštica.

In turn, North Macedonia is subdivided into eight statistical regions (Macedonian: статистички региони; Albanian: rajonet statistikore) established in 2007 and based on the municipal framework; one of these regions, Skopje, encompasses Greater Skopje and the surrounding area.

== Municipalities (2013–present) ==
No.	Municipality	Municipality centre	Area (km^{2})	Population (2002)	Population (2021)
	Eastern Statistical Region (Источен регион - Istočen region)		3,539	181,858	150,234
39	Berovo (Берово)	Berovo (Берово)	597	13,941	10,890
28	Češinovo-Obleševo (Чешиново-Облешево)	Obleševo (Облешево)	133	7,490	5,471
26	Delčevo (Делчево)	Delčevo (Делчево)	423	17,505	13,585
29	Karbinci (Карбинци)	Karbinci (Карбинци)	231	4,012	3,420
24	Kočani (Кочани)	Kočani (Кочани)	357	38,092	31,602
25	Makedonska Kamenica (Македонска Каменица)	Makedonska Kamenica (Македонска Каменица)	189	8,110	6,439
38	Pehčevo (Пехчево)	Pehčevo (Пехчево)	208	5,517	3,983
23	Probištip (Пробиштип)	Probištip (Пробиштип)	326	16,193	13,417
31	Štip (Штип)	Štip (Штип)	583	47,796	44,866
27	Vinica (Виница)	Vinica (Виница)	432	19,938	14,475
30	Zrnovci (Зрновци)	Zrnovci (Зрновци)	52	3,264	2,086
	Northeastern (Североисточен регион - Severoistočen region)		2,306	172,787	152,982
21	Kratovo (Кратово)	Kratovo (Кратово)	375	10,441	7,545
20	Kriva Palanka (Крива Паланка)	Kriva Palanka (Крива Паланка)	482	20,820	18,059
17	Kumanovo (Куманово)	Kumanovo (Куманово)	432	105,484	98,104
7	Lipkovo (Липково)	Lipkovo (Липково)	270	27,058	22,308
19	Rankovce (Ранковце)	Rankovce (Ранковце)	240	4,144	3,465
18	Staro Nagoričane (Старо Нагоричане)	Staro Nagoričane (Старо Нагоричане)	515	4,840	3,501
	Pelagonia Statistical Region (Пелагониски регион - Pelagoniski region)		4,719	238,136	210,431
71	Bitola (Битола)	Bitola (Битола)	790	105,644	85,164
70	Demir Hisar (Демир Хисар)	Demir Hisar (Демир Хисар)	480	9,497	7,260
51	Dolneni (Долнени)	Dolneni (Долнени)	418	13,568	13,126
72	Krivogaštani (Кривогаштани)	Krivogaštani (Кривогаштани)	88	6,150	5,167
52	Kruševo (Крушево)	Kruševo (Крушево)	190	9,684	8,385
73	Mogila (Могила)	Mogila, North Macedonia (Могила)	255	6,710	5,283
74	Novaci (Новаци)	Novaci (Новаци)	755	3,549	2,648
50	Prilep (Прилеп)	Prilep (Прилеп)	1,198	76,768	69,025
69	Resen (Ресен)	Resen (Ресен)	549	16,825	14,373
	Polog Statistical Region (Полошки регион - Pološki region)		2,479	304,125	251,552
59	Bogovinje (Боговиње)	Bogovinje (Боговиње)	141	28,997	22,906
12	Brvenica (Брвеница)	Brvenica (Брвеница)	164	15,855	13,645
60	Gostivar (Гостивар)	Gostivar (Гостивар)	375	81,042	59,770
9	Jegunovce (Јегуновце)	Jegunovce (Јегуновце)	174	10,790	8,895
61	Mavrovo and Rostuša (Маврово и Ростуша)	Rostuša (Ростуша)	856	8,618	5,042
10	Tearce (Теарце)	Tearce (Теарце)	137	22,454	17,694
11	Tetovo (Тетово)	Tetovo (Тетово)	262	86,580	84,770
58	Vrapčište (Врапчиште)	Vrapčište (Врапчиште)	157	25,399	19,842
2	Želino (Желино)	Želino (Желино)	201	24,390	18,988
	Skopje Statistical Region (Скопски регион - Skopski region)		1,818	578,144	607,007
1.3	Aerodrom (Аеродром)	Aerodrom (Аеродром)	20	72,009	77,735
75	Aračinovo (Арачиново)	Aračinovo (Арачиново)	38	11,597	12,676
1.6	Butel (Бутел)	Butel (Бутел)	61	36,154	37,968
1.4	Čair (Чаир)	Čair (Чаир)	3	64,773	62,586
1.1	Centar (Центар)	Centar (Центар)	9	45,412	43,893
8	Čučer-Sandevo (Чучер Сандево)	Čučer-Sandevo (Чучер Сандево)	215	8,493	9,200
1.2	Gazi Baba (Гази Баба)	Gazi Baba (Гази Баба)	92	72,617	69,626
1.9	Gjorče Petrov (Ѓорче Петров)	Gjorče Petrov (Ѓорче Петров)	63	41,634	44,844
6	Ilinden (Илинден)	Ilinden (Илинден)	97	15,894	17,435
1.8	Karpoš (Карпош)	Karpoš (Карпош)	21	59,666	63,760
1.5	Kisela Voda (Кисела Вода)	Kisela Voda (Кисела Вода)	43	57,236	61,695
16	Petrovec (Петровец)	Petrovec (Петровец)	222	8,255	9,150
1.10	Saraj (Сарај)	Saraj (Сарај)	230	35,408	38,399
3	Sopište (Сопиште)	Sopište (Сопиште)	223	5,656	6,713
4	Studeničani (Студеничани)	Studeničani (Студеничани)	276	17,246	21,970
1.7	Šuto Orizari (Шуто Оризари)	Šuto Orizari (Шуто Оризари)	6	17,357	25,726
5	Zelenikovo (Зелениково)	Zelenikovo (Зелениково)	177	4,077	3,361
	Southeastern Statistical Region (Југоисточен регион - Jugoistočen region)		2,741	171,416	148,387
46	Bogdanci (Богданци)	Bogdanci (Богданци)	114	8,707	7,339
41	Bosilovo (Босилово)	Bosilovo (Босилово)	143	14,260	11,508
47	Gevgelija (Гевгелија)	Gevgelija (Гевгелија)	484	22,988	21,582
45	Dojran (Дојран)	Star Dojran (Стар Дојран)	129	3,426	3,084
36	Konče (Конче)	Konče (Конче)	233	3,536	2,725
42	Novo Selo (Ново Село)	Novo Selo (Ново Село)	257	11,567	6,972
37	Radoviš (Радовиш)	Radoviš (Радовиш)	502	28,244	24,122
43	Strumica (Струмица)	Strumica (Струмица)	311	54,676	49,995
44	Valandovo (Валандово)	Valandovo (Валандово)	331	11,890	10,508
40	Vasilevo (Василево)	Vasilevo (Василево)	231	12,122	10,552
	Southwestern Statistical Region (Југозападен регион - Jugozapaden region)		3,280	221,546	177,398
63	Centar Župa (Центар Жупа)	Centar Župa (Центар Жупа)	107	6,519	3,720
62	Debar (Дебар)	Debar (Дебар)	85	19,542	15,412
67	Debarca (Дебарца)	Belčišta (Белчишта)	423	5,507	3,719
55	Kičevo (Кичево)	Kičevo (Кичево)	838	56,734	39,669
13	Makedonski Brod (Македонски Брод)	Makedonski Brod (Македонски Брод)	875	7,141	5,889
68	Ohrid (Охрид)	Ohrid (Охрид)	392	55,749	51,428
53	Plasnica (Пласница)	Plasnica (Пласница)	54	4,545	4,222
65	Struga (Струга)	Struga (Струга)	469	63,376	50,980
66	Vevčani (Вевчани)	Vevčani (Вевчани)	35	2,433	2,359
	Vardar Statistical Region (Вардарски регион - Vardarski region)		3,995	154,535	138,722
14	Čaška (Чашка)	Čaška (Чашка)	727	7,673	7,942
48	Demir Kapija (Демир Капија)	Demir Kapija (Демир Капија)	312	4,545	3,777
33	Gradsko (Градско)	Gradsko (Градско)	291	3,760	3,233
49	Kavadarci (Кавадарци)	Kavadarci (Кавадарци)	998	38,741	35,733
35	Negotino (Неготино)	Negotino (Неготино)	414	19,212	18,194
34	Rosoman (Росоман)	Rosoman (Росоман)	133	4,141	3,796
22	Sveti Nikole (Свети Николе)	Sveti Nikole (Свети Николе)	483	18,497	15,320
32	Lozovo (Лозово)	Lozovo (Лозово)	166	2,858	2,264
15	Veles (Велес)	Veles (Велес)	518	55,108	48,463
		Subtotal	24,856		
		Total	25,713	2,022,547	1,836,713

In March 2013, the following municipalities merged with Kičevo:

No. (Реден број)	Municipality (Општина)	Municipality Center (Центар на Општината)	Area (km^{2})	Population (2002)
64	Drugovo (Другово)	Drugovo (Другово)	383	3,249
56	Oslomej (Осломеј)	Oslomej (Осломеј)	137	10,420
54	Vraneštica (Вранештица)	Vraneštica (Вранештица)	109	1,322
57	Zajas (Зајас)	Zajas (Зајас)	161	11,605

Map of the municipalities of North Macedonia before 2013

== See also ==
- List of municipalities in North Macedonia by population
- Statistical regions of North Macedonia
- Administrative divisions of North Macedonia
- List of FIPS region codes: North Macedonia (MK)
- ISO 3166-2:MK, ISO 3166-2 subdivision codes for the Republic of North Macedonia

== Notes ==
Municipal areas are summations of component areas. As of the 2002 census, area figures for Aerodrom and Butel municipalities are unavailable and included in those of other municipalities in Skopje region
Municipalities, 10 in total, forming the City of Skopje (Град Скопје)
Hierarchical Administrative Subdivision Codes (HASC)
The boundaries for Debar municipality in the Southwestern region were revised in 2004 to include some territory of Rostuša municipality, the predecessor of Mavrovo and Rostuša municipality, in Polog region
Total area includes 577 km^{2} (223 sq mi) of inland water not distributed by municipality/region
