= Golemo Konjari =

Golemo Konjari Големо Коњари
- Village
- Location within North Macedonia
- Country: North Macedonia
- Region: Pelagonia
- Municipality: Prilep
- Elevation: 607 m (1,991 ft)

Population (2021)
  - Total: 613
- Time zone: UTC+1 (CET)
- Postal code: 7509
- Area code: +389-48

Golemo Konjari is a village in Municipality of Prilep, North Macedonia.

== Geography ==
Golemo Konjari is located in the Prilep valley, in the wider Pelagonia region. The village is flat and is at an altitude of 607 meters above sea level. It is located 9 km from Prilep. The surrounding villages are: Varoš to the east, Malo Konjari to the south, Vrvjani to the west and Slavej, Zapolžani and Mažučiste to the north.

== Demographics ==
In the book "Ethnography of the Provinces of Adrianople, Monastir and Thessaloniki", published in Constantinople in 1878 and reflecting the statistics of the male population from 1873, the village is listed as inhabited by 74 households, with 67 Muslim and 258 Bulgarian inhabitants. According to the statistics of Vasil Kanchov ("Macedonia. Ethnography and Statistics") from 1900, it had 590 inhabitants, of whom 550 were Bulgarian Orthodox Christians and 40 were Muslim Turks. At the beginning of the 20th century the whole Orthodox population of the village was under the jurisdiction of the Bulgarian Exarchate. Per the secretary of the Exarchate Dimitar Mishev ("La Macedoine et sa Population Chrétienne") in 1905 there were 400 Bulgarian Exarchists in Golemo Konjari.

According to the 2002 census, the village had a total of 699 inhabitants. Ethnic groups in the village include:

- Macedonians 699

Historical Demographics:
Year	1900	1905	1948	1953	1961	1971	1981	1991	1994	2002
Population	590	400	851	945	926	922	906	725	685	699

=== Families ===
All the families in the village are immigrants. The families are separated into three neighbourhoods: Upper Neighbourhood, Lower Neighbourhood, and Neighbourhood Albania.

Families of the Upper Neighbourhood:

Paralovci, the oldest family in the village, their ancestor Risto settled in the village at the very beginning of the 19 century from the village Paralovo in Bitola; Bumbarovci, settled from the village of Sveta, near Demir Hisar; Svakarovci and Petrevci, settled from the neighboring village of Malo Konjari and settled there from an unknown place; Buntevci, settled from a village in the Mijak area; Makalovci, "wandered through the villages", settling Malo Konjari and finally Golemo Konjari; Mantarovci, settled from the village of Čepigovo; Pacanovci, Severkovci, Carčevci and Danovci, settled from unknown places.

Families of the Lower Neighbourhood:

Mijakovci, settled from a village in the Mijak area, they are the second oldest family in the village after Paralovci; Srcevci, and Talimdziovci, settled from Virovo, near Demir Hisar; Nedanovci, settled from Krušeani; Klapovci, and Crnevci, settled from Belo Pole, where they have relatives, in Belo Pole they settled from the now non-existing village of Dabjani; Čapagovci, settled from Kadino Selo, where they were settlers from an unknown place; Sedlovci, are a branch of the family Mantarovci in the Upper Neighbourhood, they settled from Čepigovo, Goce Sedloski originates from this family; Iljomanovci, and Ljumevci, settled from the neighboring village of Malo Konjari and settled there from an unknown place; Gjirtovci, "wandered through the villages like boys", settling from Vrbjani; Vidanovci, used to live in the villages of Vrbjani, Malo Konjari and other villages, and Butrakovci, are settlers from an unknown place.

Families of the Neighbourhood Albania:

Kasniovci, and Čuljevci, used to be one family, they settled from Malo Konjari, where their relatives Svakarovci live; Pucakovkovci, settled from a village near Demir Hisar.

== Politics ==
=== Polling station ===
The polling station of the village is polling station no.1448 according to the State Election Commission, housed in the premises of the elementary school.

In the 2019 presidential election, a total of 544 voters were registered at this polling station.

== Cultural and natural sights ==
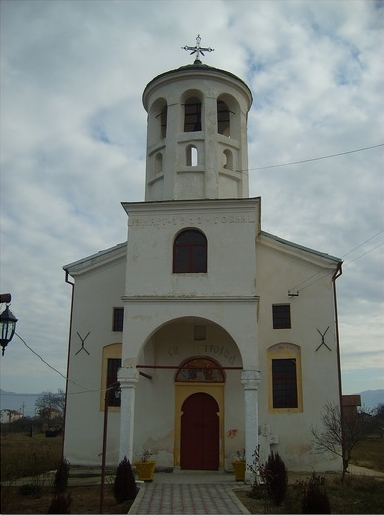
Holy Trinity's Church in Golemo Konjari, Prilep, Macedonia

The Church of St. Trinity is the main church of the village.

The locality of Lokva is located near the village, which is strictly a nature reserve. It consists of three bars, remnants of the former Pelagonia swamp. They are home to 50 different species, 16 of which are naturally rare. The site is known for its relict endemic willow shrimp (Chirocephalus pelagonicus), which survives only in this area.

== Notable people ==
Goce Sedloski - Macedonian football player, member of the Macedonian national football team.

== Sports ==
The local football club, FK Golemo Konjari, plays in the Macedonian Third League.

== Emigration ==
Konjarci, Biljarovci, and Kumitovci, emigrated to Dolno Orizari near Bitola. Barlevci, emigrated to Borotino. Konjarci, and Kulevci emigrated to Belo Pole. Čačarovci, emigrated to Vrbjani. Butrakovci, emigrated to Krušeani. Konjarci, emigrated to Dolno Srpci near Bitola. Slivovci, emigrated to Zapolžani. Crnevci, emigrated to Alinci. Strežovci, emigrated to Zabrčani.
