= Dolno Orizari, Bitola =

Dolno Orizari Долно Оризари
- Village
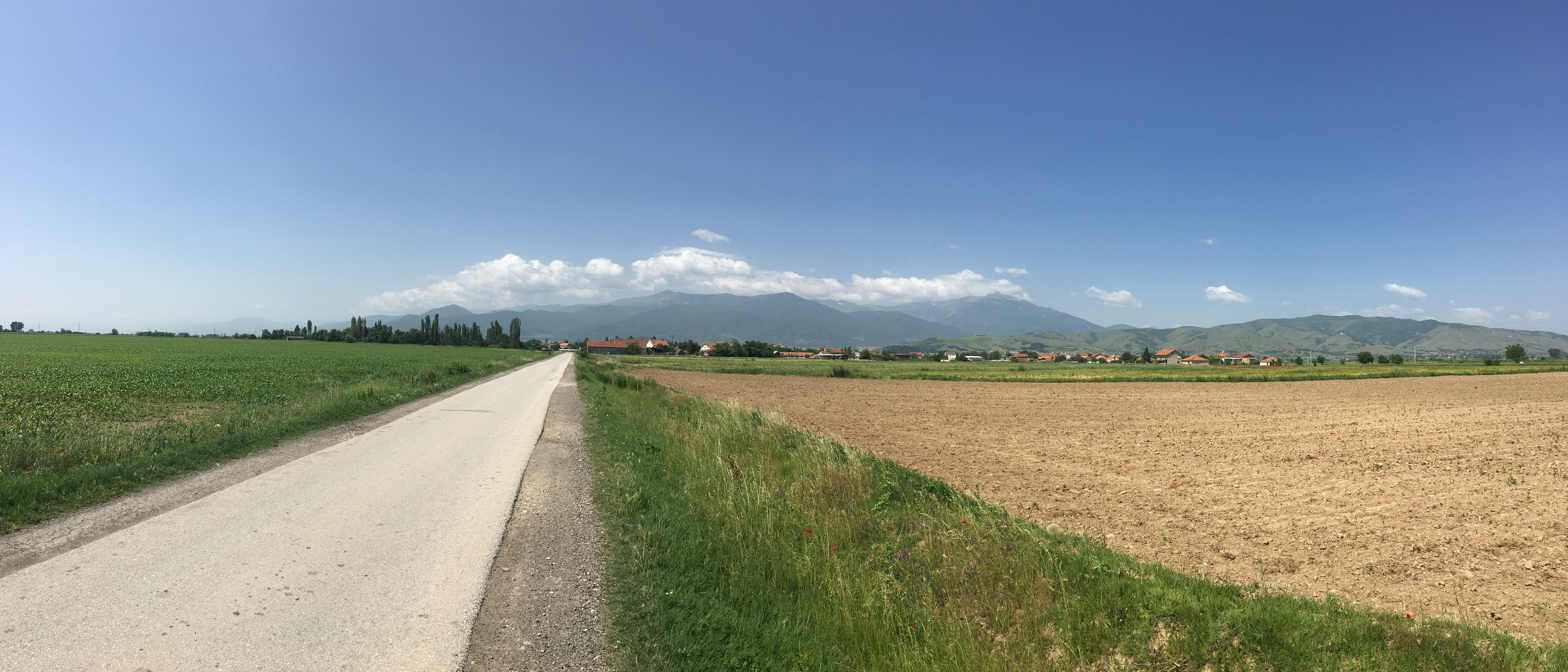
- Panoramic view of the village

- Location within North Macedonia
- Country: North Macedonia
- Region: Pelagonia region
- Municipality: Bitola municipality

Population (2002)
  - Total: 1,834
- Time zone: UTC+1 (CET)
  - Summer (DST): UTC+2 (CEST)

Dolno Orizari (Macedonian: Долно Оризари) is a village 3.98 kilometres (2.47 mi) from Bitola, the second-largest city in North Macedonia. According to the 2002 census, the total population is 1834.

== Geography and location ==
At an altitude of 577 meters, the village is in Pelagonia, in the center of the Bitola valley, close to the city of Bitola, in the northern part of the territory of the Municipality of Bitola. Its neighbouring villages are Gorno Orizari, Karamani, and Logovardi.

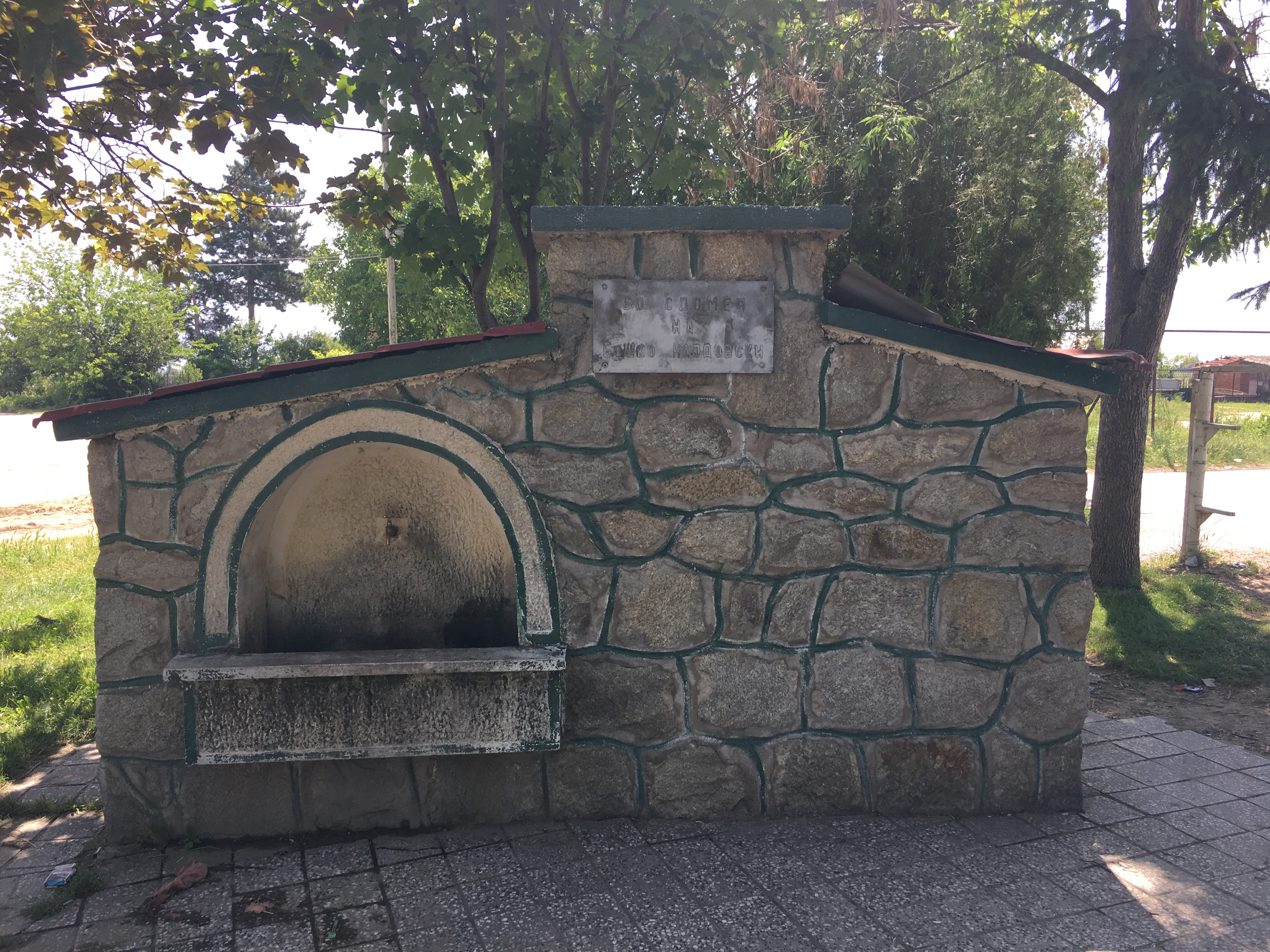
A water tap and memorial dedicated to Boško Najdovski.

== History ==
The village is fairly new. According to the legend, it was established at the end of the 19th century. During this time, Dolno Orizari was under the Manastir Vilayet of the Ottoman Empire. According to the statistics of Vasil Kanchov ("Macedonia. Ethnography and Statistics") in 1900 Dolno Orizari had 440 inhabitants, all Bulgarians. According to the secretary of the Bulgarian Exarchate Dimitar Mishev's study ("La Macedoine et sa Population Chrétienne") in 1905 in Dolno Orizari lived 216 Bulgarian Exarchists.

== Demographics ==
Due to its proximity to the city of Bitola, it became a place of emigration in the mid-late 20th century. In 1961, it had 848 inhabitants, whilst in 1994, that number increased to 1,503 inhabitants.

According to the 2002 census, 1,834 inhabitants lived in the village, 1,828 Macedonians, 4 Roma, 1 Vlach and 1 other.

| Year | 1900 | 1905 | 1948 | 1953 | 1961 | 1971 | 1981 | 1991 | 1994 | 2002 |
|---|---|---|---|---|---|---|---|---|---|---|
| Population | 440 | 216 | 525 | 643 | 848 | 836 | 1.236 | 1.543 | 1.503 | 1.834 |

=== Inhabitants ===
Dolno Orizari is a Macedonian Orthodox village, all of the families in the village are immigrants.

According to studies from the late 1940s, the roots of the families of Dolno Orizari are as follows:

- Older families: Maslarovci, Stajevci, and Vragovci, descend from unknown places, the first two families descend from the same ancestor; Klepačovci, descend from the village Klepač, with farther roots from the Prespa region; Beličovci, related to Klepačovci and Gjorevci, descend from an unknown village in Prilep.
- Newer families: Jakovčevci and Jurukovci, descend from neighbouring Karamani; Konjarci, descend from the village of Konjari near Prilep, it is unknown whether they are from Malo Konjari or Golemo Konjari; Kjumkovci descend from neighbouring Logovardi; Ravanovci, descend from Porodin; Demirovci, descend from Logovardi, where they belonged to the family Stanoovci; Bendžovci and Spirovci, descend from Dobromiri; Šutakovci, descend from Alinci; Krepiovci, descend from Radobor; Nočevci, descend from Sveto Todori; Čepelovci, descend from Logovardi; Morijovci, descend from Tepavci; Srpčani, descend from the village Dolno Srpci; Čarlinci, Karpašovci, and Vejkrpa, descend from Dolna Čarlija; Sazdo, descend from Meglenci; Štrkovci, and Stojčevci, descend from Virovo; Nočevci, descend from Sloeštica; Trpevci, descend from the surroundings of Struga; Grkot, and Petre, descend from the surroundings of Voden; Angjelevci, Boškovci, Kekerovci, Basarovci, Čakrevci, Lozanovci, Musliovci, Krstevci, and Birtanovci, descend from unknown places.

The majority of these families settled in Dolno Orizari prior to 1912.

== Notable residents ==
=== Born in Dolno Orizari ===
- Boško Najdovski (1976–2001) — died defending Macedonia in the Vejce ambush.

== Institutions ==
- Elementary school Dame Gruev – Dolno Orizari.
- Clinic Niko Mediko.
- Post Office (7204).
- Kindergarten Estreja-Ovadija Mara.

== Cultural and natural sights ==
=== Archeological localities ===
- Geramidnica – a locality from bronze and late-ancient times;
- St. Petka – a church from medieval times;
- Sever I – a locality from neolithic times;
- Sever II – a locality from neolithic times;
- Domus Pole I – a locality from medieval times;
- Sakojci – a locality from neolithic times.

=== Churches ===
- Church St. Petka – the main village church
