= Battle of Uskana (169 BC) =

Macedonian victory over Rome

- Part of The Third Macedonian War
Date	169 BC or 168 BC
Location	Modern day Kičevo
Result	Macedonian victory
Territorial changes	Macedonia conquers Uskana

Belligerents
Roman Republic; Illyrian soldiers	Macedonian kingdom

Commanders and leaders
Gaius Carvilius (surrendered); Gaius Afranius C. f. Stellio (surrendered)	Perseus of Macedon

Strength
4,000 Roman troops 500 Illyrian cavalry	10,000 infantry 2,000 lightly armed soldiers 500 cavalry

Casualties and losses
Unknown casualties 500 surrendered	Unknown
- A big amount of the town's population enslaved

The battle of Uskana or siege of Uskana was a battle between the Roman Republic and the Macedonian Kingdom that took place in 169 BC that resulted in Macedonian victory.

== Background ==
Before the battle of 169 BC there was another battle in the year 171 BC or 170 BC in the same town. Roman consul Appius Claudius who was sent in a campaign had settled in Lychnidos with 4,000 troops but had gathered another 4,000 troops. Appius Claudius had received a message that the people of Uskana would give the city to him. He went to the city with 7,000 troops letting 1,000 troops in Lychnidos. Appius Claudius thinking that the city was going to be given to him didn't form a military formation. The battle cost the Romans 5,000-6,000 men.

Battle of Uskana (171 BC)
- Part of The Third Macedonian War
Date	171 BC or 170 BC
Location	Modern day Kičevo
Result	Illyrian-Cretan victory
Territorial changes	Status quo ante bellum

Belligerents
Roman Republic	Illyrians from Uskana; Cretan garrison

Commanders and leaders
Appius Claudius	Unknown

Strength
7,000 troops	Unknown

Casualties and losses
5,000-6,000 killed	Unknown

== Battle ==
The Macedonian king Perseus of Macedon marched 3 days from Stubera to Uskana with 10,000 infantry, 2,000 lightly armed soldiers and 500 cavalry. Around 4,000 Roman troops and 500 Illyrian cavalry were stationed in the city. The fighting continued day and night. When the Romans and Illyrians saw the Macedonian siege towers they realized that further defense of the city was in vain. Roman generals Gaius Carvilius and Caius Afranius were sent to negotiate with the Macedonians and he let the Roman soldiers withdraw from the city, but not before taking their weapons and the remaining 500 Illyrian cavalry surrendered.

== Aftermath ==
After the battle ended Perseus of Macedon established a Macedonian garrison at Uskana he also captured parts of the city's entire population and sent them to Stubera. The Illyrians and Uscans were sold as slaves to Penestae.
