= Klepač =

Klepač or Klepáč may refer to:

- Klepač, North Macedonia, a village near Prilep
- Klepáč, a mountain in the Czech Republic and Poland
- Klepač (surname) (lists Klepač, Klepáč, Klepáčová surnames)
