= Vrbjani =

Vrbjani may refer to:

- Vrbjani, Krivogaštani, North Macedonia
- Vrbjani, Mavrovo and Rostuša, North Macedonia
