= Penestae =

Penestae may refer to:

- Penestai (or penestae), a class of unfree labourers in Thessaly, Ancient Greece
- Penestae (tribe), an Illyrian tribe that lived in south-eastern Illyria
