= Pašino Ruvci =

Pašino Ruvci / Pashino Ruvci Пашино Рувци
- Village
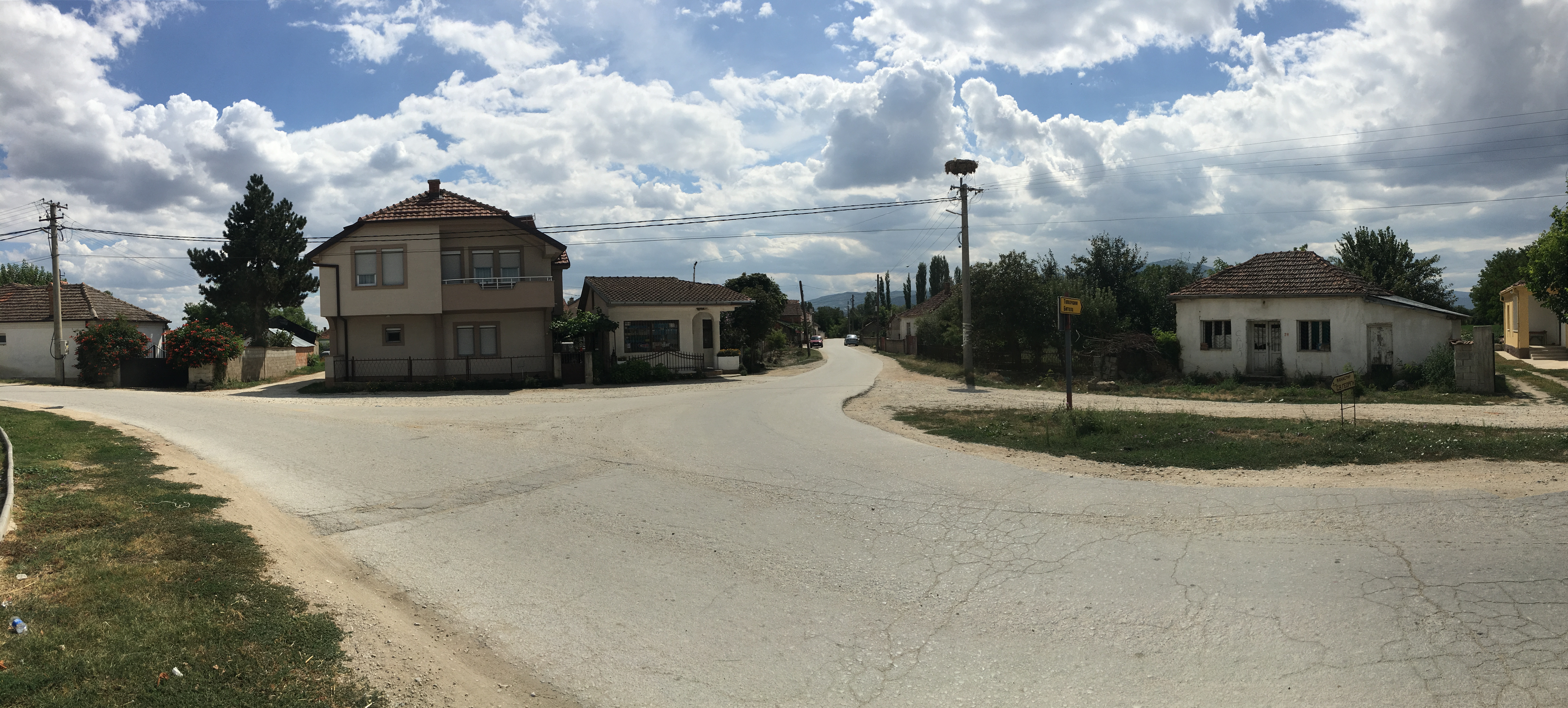
- Panoramic view of the village

- Location within North Macedonia
- Country: North Macedonia
- Region: Pelagonia
- Municipality: Krivogaštani
- Elevation: 568 m (1,864 ft)

Population (2002)
  - Total: 627
- Time zone: UTC+1 (CET)
- Area code: +38948

Pašino Ruvci (Macedonian: Пашино Рувци) is a village in Municipality of Krivogaštani, North Macedonia.

== Geography and location ==
The village of Pashino Ruvci is located on the southwest of Prilep. The closest village to it is Obrshani, which is just northern of Pashino Ruvci.

== History ==
Pashino Ruvci, for the first time in the history archives, is mentioned as Rusche or Ruvce in the period between 1650 and 1750. In the mid-19th century, together with the village of Borotino, they were given as a gift from the Turkish government to Ali-pasha from Bitola, as a reward for his contributions during the war.

At the end of the 19th century, the village was part of Bitola's kaza.

The old name of this village, given by the ottomans during their reign is Ashar Usu.

== Demography ==
According to the statistics of Vasil Kanchov ("Macedonia, Ethnography and statistics") from 1900, in Pashino Ruvci lived 450 villagers, all of which were Bulgarians.

According to the Bulgarian Exarchate secretary, Dimitar Mishev, ("La Macédoine et sa Population Chrétienne") in 1905 in Pashino Ruvci there were 256 Bulgarians.

According to the 2002 census, the village of Pashino Ruvci has 277 households, with 627 inhabitants, all of which are Macedonians.

Pashino Ruvci's population throughout the years:
| Year: | 1900 | 1905 | 1948 | 1953 | 1961 | 1971 | 1981 | 1991 | 1994 | 2002 |
|---|---|---|---|---|---|---|---|---|---|---|
| Population: | 450 | 256 | 834 | 936 | 1.018 | 976 | 979 | 744 | 659 | 627 |
