= Alinci =

Alinci may refer to:

- Alinci, Mogila, a small village in North Macedonia
- Alinci, Prilep, a village in the Municipality of Prilep, North Macedonia
