= Vogjani =

Voǵani / Vogjani Воѓани
- Village
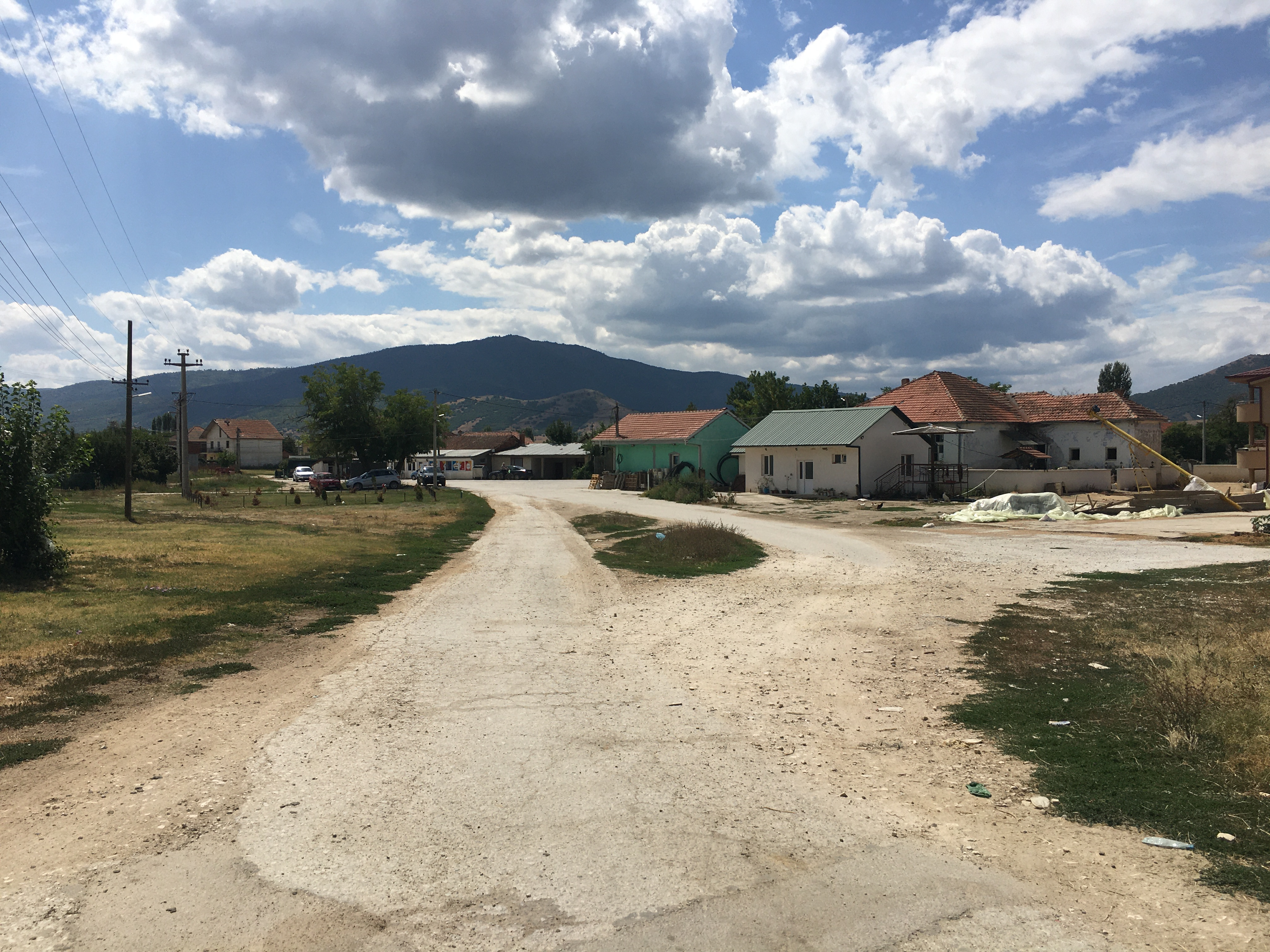
- Center of the village

- Location within North Macedonia
- Country: North Macedonia
- Region: Pelagonia
- Municipality: Krivogaštani
- Elevation: 572 m (1,877 ft)

Population (2002)
  - Total: 454
- Time zone: UTC+1 (CET)
- Area code: +38948

Vogjani (Macedonian: Воѓани, also transliterated Voǵani) is a small village situated in North Macedonia. It lies at the end of a cluster of villages including Bela Crkva and Krušeani. The river Crna runs alongside the village. Its position makes it the final village in its part of the Municipality of Krivogaštani (within the Pelagonia statistical region), with bordering Bučin further down the Crna being in the neighbouring Kruševo Municipality. The settlement has an absolute Macedonian majority.

The village has a post office and has a rail link with the municipality (opština) of Demir Hisar. The rail link continues to the village of Sopotnica and was constructed in late 1950. The line was a link between the upper Demir Hisar region and the Bakarno Gumno exchange, which was then included within the rest of the wider rail network.

== Demographics ==
Vogjani appears in the 1467-68 Ottoman defter. The registered inhabitants displayed Slavic anthroponymy alongside mixed Slavic-Albanian anthroponymy, with instances of individuals bearing both Slavic and Albanian names. The names are: Niko son of Gjergj, Niko Kalogjer, Nikola son of Pronko, Niko son of Pronko, (different individual), Tano son of Kojçin, Dimitri son of Gropça, Stajko son of Dança, Jani son of Kukurec, Mino son of Baldo (Baldus), Drala son of Boja..

According to the 2002 census, the village had a total of 454 inhabitants. Ethnic groups in the village include:

- Macedonians 452
- Serbs 1
- Others 1
