= Penestae (tribe) =

Ancient illyrian tribe

The Penestae were an Illyrian tribe dwelling in southeastern Illyria, in an inland region that was called Penestia, which was located around the Black Drin valley north of Lake Ohrid, between present-day eastern Albania and western North Macedonia. They are firstly mentioned by ancient Roman historian Livy. They appear several times in Livy's accounts of the events concerning the Third Macedonian War (171–168 BC), which was fought between the Roman Republic and the Kingdom of Macedonia under Perseus. Their chief city was Uscana, most likely located in the valley of the Black Drin in the region of Dibra.

== Name ==
The tribe is mentioned only by Livy (1st century BC – 1st century AD) as Penestae (in Latin). They appear several times in Livy's accounts of the Third Roman-Macedonian War, which occurred in the early 2nd century BC.

Based on the presence of the typical Illyrian suffix -st-, the name is considered to be Illyrian, such as Pirustae, for example. The name may also be connected to the Πενέσται (Penestai), a Thessalian social class, which can alternatively be considered a simple linguistic change of the Ancient Greek term Μενέσται (Menéstai, "those who remain"), as already pointed out by Archemachus of Euboea, or related to the Ancient Greek πένης (pénes, "poor").

== Geography ==
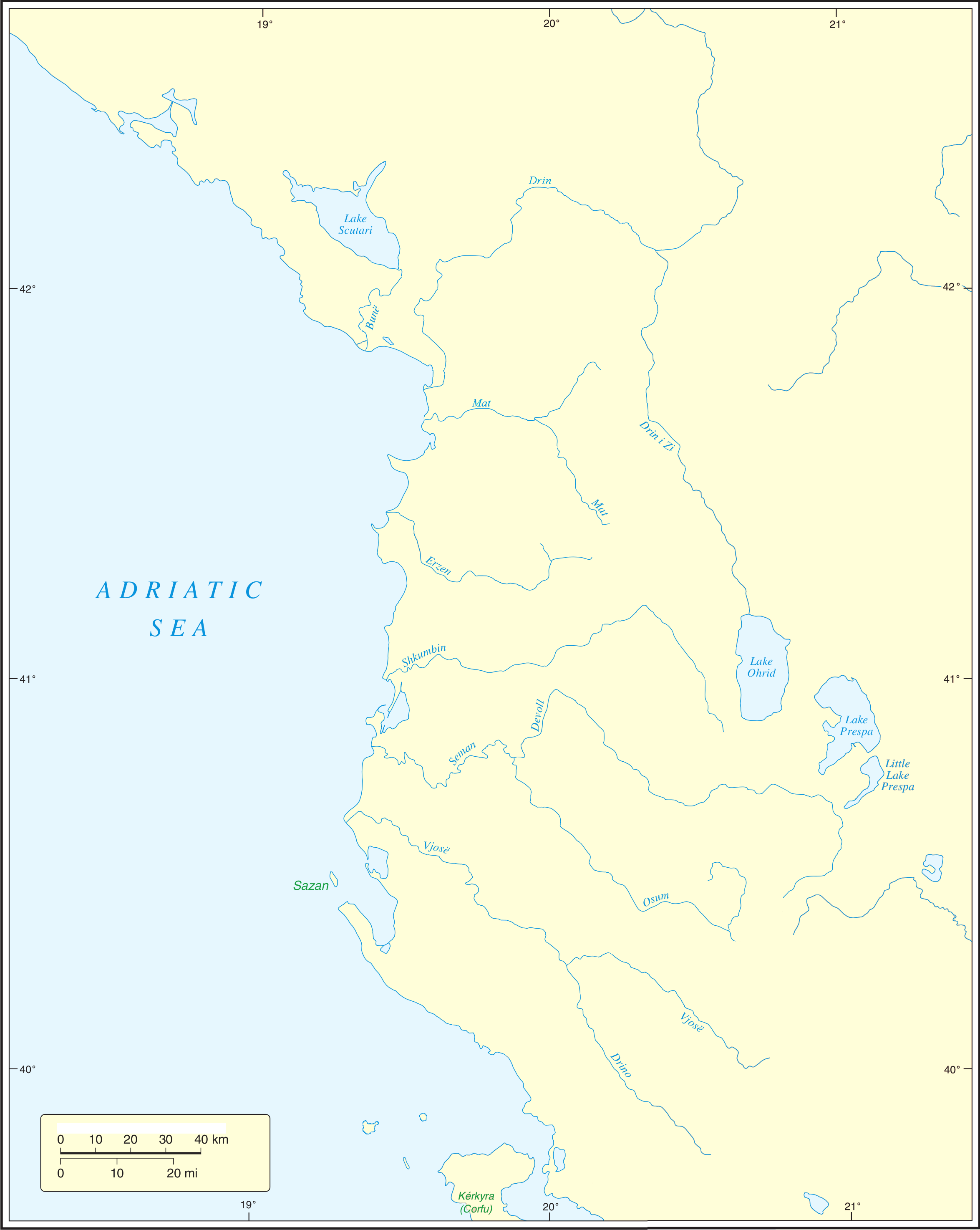

The tribe inhabited Penestia, an inland region in southeastern Illyria, located around the Black Drin valley north of Lake Ohrid. The Penestae were bordered by the Dassaretii and Parthini to the south, the Dardani to the north (from which they were separated by the Skardon (or Scardus) Mountains). In the east, the Penestae were neighboured by Ancient Macedonia. The nearby Stuberra (present-day Čepigovo) was used by Perseus of Macedon to access Uscana in Penestia from the south-east. The westernmost territory of the Penestae extended to the domains of the Labeatae.

=== Settlements ===
The chief settlement of the Penestae was Uscana, most likely located in the valley of the Black Drin in the region of Dibra. The territory of the Penestae appears to have been densely populated, because Livy mentions the existence of eleven fortified settlements, in addition to Uscana, Draudacum and Oaeneum, the latter being a strategically important settlement on the route to the tribal region of the Labeatae, over which Gentius ruled. Draudacum and Oaeneum lied within the Pollog Valley region, which was inhabited and ruled by both the Penestae and the Dardanians.

== History ==
In Livy's accounts of the Third Macedonian War, which was fought between the Roman Republic and the Kingdom of Macedon in the years 171–168 BC, the Penestae are not considered part of the realm of the Illyrian king Gentius. During the that war the Penestae, alongside the Parthini, remained loyal to Rome.

Perseus of Macedon, after his successful diplomatic actions in Epirus and military campaigns against the Dardani, also undertook several campaigns in Penestia. Firstly, he stopped at Stuberra for supplies and equipment, and then he proceeded to Uscana in Penestian territory.

=== Siege of Uscana ===
The stronghold of Uscana was occupied by a mixed force of Romans and Illyrians. The city resisted intensely until its inhabitants realized that they did not have enough grain to counter the siege over a much longer period, noting that Perseus' Macedonian forces brought up to the walls their siege sheds. Therefore the Romans asked the Macedonian king to be allowed to leave with their properties and weapons or with their life and freedom. Perseus granted the first request, but then he confiscated the soldiers' weapons, took the Romans into custody and brought them to Stuberra. Meanwhile the Macedonian king sold into slavery the Illyrian soldiers and the inhabitants of the town.

=== Siege of Oaeneum ===
The Macedonian king aimed also to capture Oaeneum, another Penestian town strategically located on the route to the territory of the Labeatae and the Illyrian kingdom of Gentius. Hence Perseus left Stuberra and returned to Penestia. Proceeding on the way to Oaeneum he captured also Draudacum and eleven other strongholds, mainly without undertaking battles; nevertheless he succeeded in taking 1,500 Roman soldiers prisoner. In order to besiege Oaeneum, the Macedonians built a mound against the city-wall on which ladders were brought up by the soldiers. The city was besieged and subdued by the Macedonians, who murdered the adult men and took into custody the women and children. The booty obtained from the victory over the city was distributed to Perseus' men. The Macedonian victorious army returned to Stuberra, from where Perseus immediately sent envoys to Genthius to inform him about the great successes he achieved that year, and to urge the Illyrian king to join Macedon against Rome. Perseus' ambassadors crossed the Skardus Mountains with great difficulty, then they went down to the Illyrian coast arriving in Scodra. Genthius therefore summoned them to Lissus.

== Culture ==
=== Language ===
The idiom spoken by the Penestae is included in the southern Illyrian onomastic province in modern linguistics. The territory they inhabited belongs to the area that is considered in current scholarship as the linguistic core of Illyrian.
