= Mirče Acev, Krivogaštani =

Coordinates: 41°19′08″N 21°25′23″E

Mirče Acev / Mirche Acev Мирче Ацев
- Former village
- Interactive map of Mirče Acev / Mirche Acev
- Country: North Macedonia
- Municipality: Krivogaštani
- Elevation: 581 m (1,906 ft)

Population (2021)
  - Total: 0
- Time zone: UTC+1 (CET)
- Area code: +38948

Mirche Acev is a former village in Municipality of Krivogaštani. Before World War 2, its name was Petrovo. The village is also split by the Prilep Municipality. It was abandoned between 1971 and 1981.
