= Podvis =

Podvis may refer to the following places:

- Podvis, Smolyan, Province, Bulgaria
- Podvis, Burgas Province, Bulgaria
- Podvis, Krivogaštani, North Macedonia
- Podvis, Kičevo, North Macedonia
- Podvis (Knjaževac), Serbia
- Podvis Col, Antarctica
