= Lažani =

Lažani Лажани Llazhani
- Village
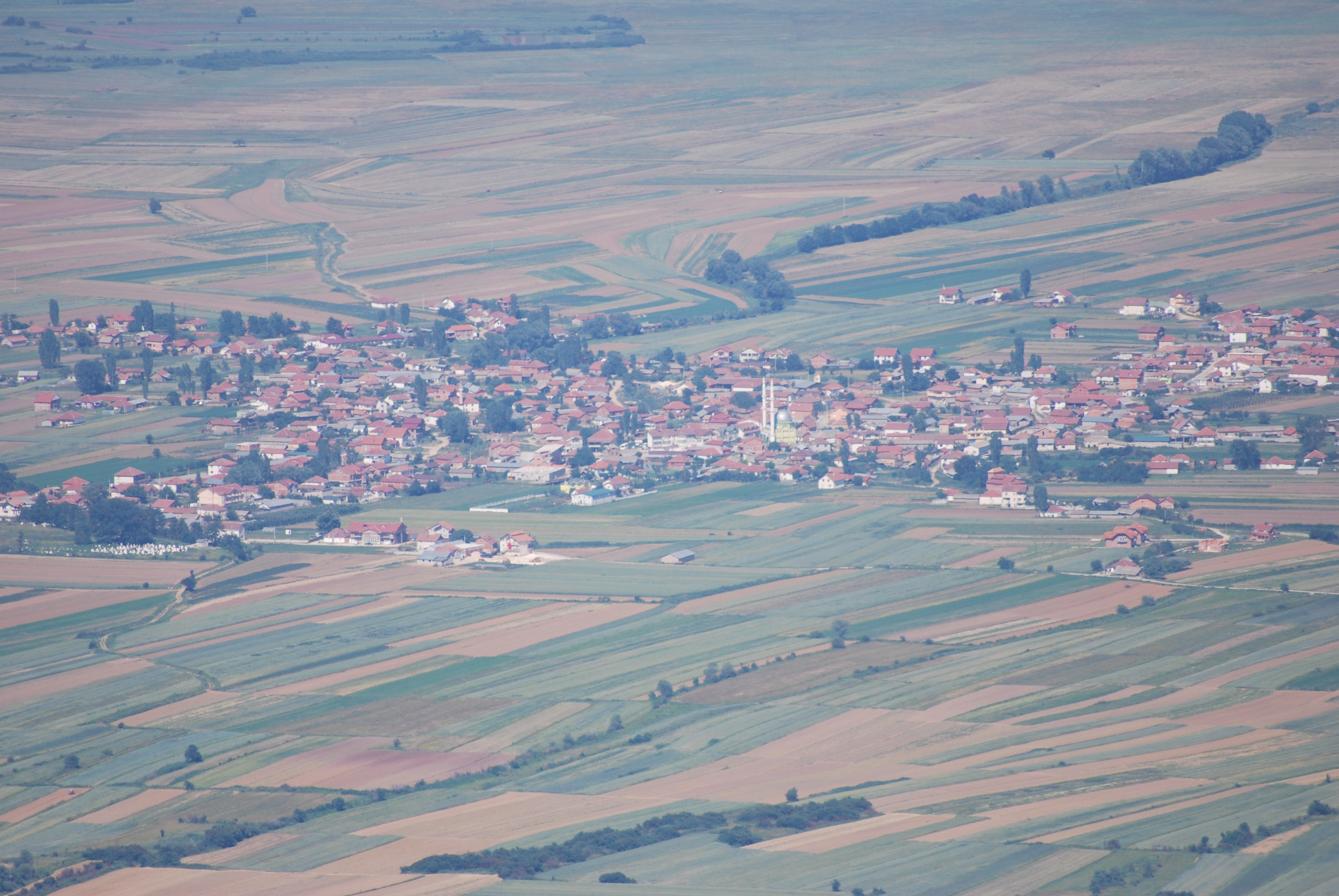
- Lažani

- Location within North Macedonia
- Coordinates: 41°26′31″N 21°18′56″E
- Country: North Macedonia
- Region: Pelagonia
- Municipality: Dolneni

Population (2021)
  - Total: 1,755
- Time zone: UTC+1 (CET)
  - Summer (DST): UTC+2 (CEST)
- Area code: +38948
- Car plates: PP
- Website: .

Lažani (Macedonian: Лажани, Albanian: Llazhani), is a village located in a lowland area in the municipality of Dolneni, North Macedonia.

== Demographics ==
The village is attested in the 1467/68 Ottoman tax registry (defter) for the Nahiyah of Kırçova. The village had a total of 8 houses, excluding bachelors (mucerred).

On the Ethnographic Map of the Bitola Vilayet of the Cartographic Institute in Sofia from 1901, Lažani appears as a mixed village of Bulgarians, Albanians and Turks in the Prilep Kaza of the Bitola Sandzak with 103 houses.

In the second half of the 20th century, Lažani was inhabited by a Torbeš population. During the 1960s, Slavic Muslims from Sandžak, known as Sandžakli settling in Debrešte were not well received by the local population which forced them to move to neighboring villages, mainly to Lažani where their numbers are high. Muslim Albanians from the sub-region of Pešter in Sandžak also settled in Lažani and number 30 households with some families bearing the surname Shkreli. The village in the 21st century has a mixed population consisting of Torbeš, Orthodox Macedonians, Bosniaks (Sandžakli) and Muslim Albanians containing 300 households amidst a population of around 2000 people. Intermarriage between Muslim Albanians and Sandžakli's occurs in the village. Torbeši from Lažani refer to the surrounding Christian population as Makedonci (Macedonians) and those Orthodox Macedonians refer to them as Turci (Turks) due to they being Muslims.

According to the 2021 census, the village had a total of 1.755 inhabitants. Ethnic groups in the village include:

- Bosniaks 901
- Turks 377
- Macedonians 264
- Albanians 153
- Others 60

Year	Macedonians	Albanians	Turks	Romani	Serbs	Bosniaks	Others	Persons for whom data was gathered from administrative sources	Total
1948	75	976	44	125	—	—	—	—	1.170
1953	155	1	1.060	23	0	0	0	—	1.239
1961	415	0	957	—	0	—	25	—	1.397
1971	607	0	822	0	3	—	277	—	1.709
1981	514	51	316	0	1	—	1.072	—	1.954
1991	367	20	444	0	1	—	1.126	—	1.958
1994	327	34	464	0	1	—	1.001	—	1.827
2002	278	108	402	0	0	1.054	22	—	1.864
2021	264	153	377	0	0	901	10	50	1.755

== Sports ==
Local football club FK Sloga 1976 plays in the Macedonian Third League.
