= Logovardi Airfield =

Аеродром Логоварди Logovardi Airfield
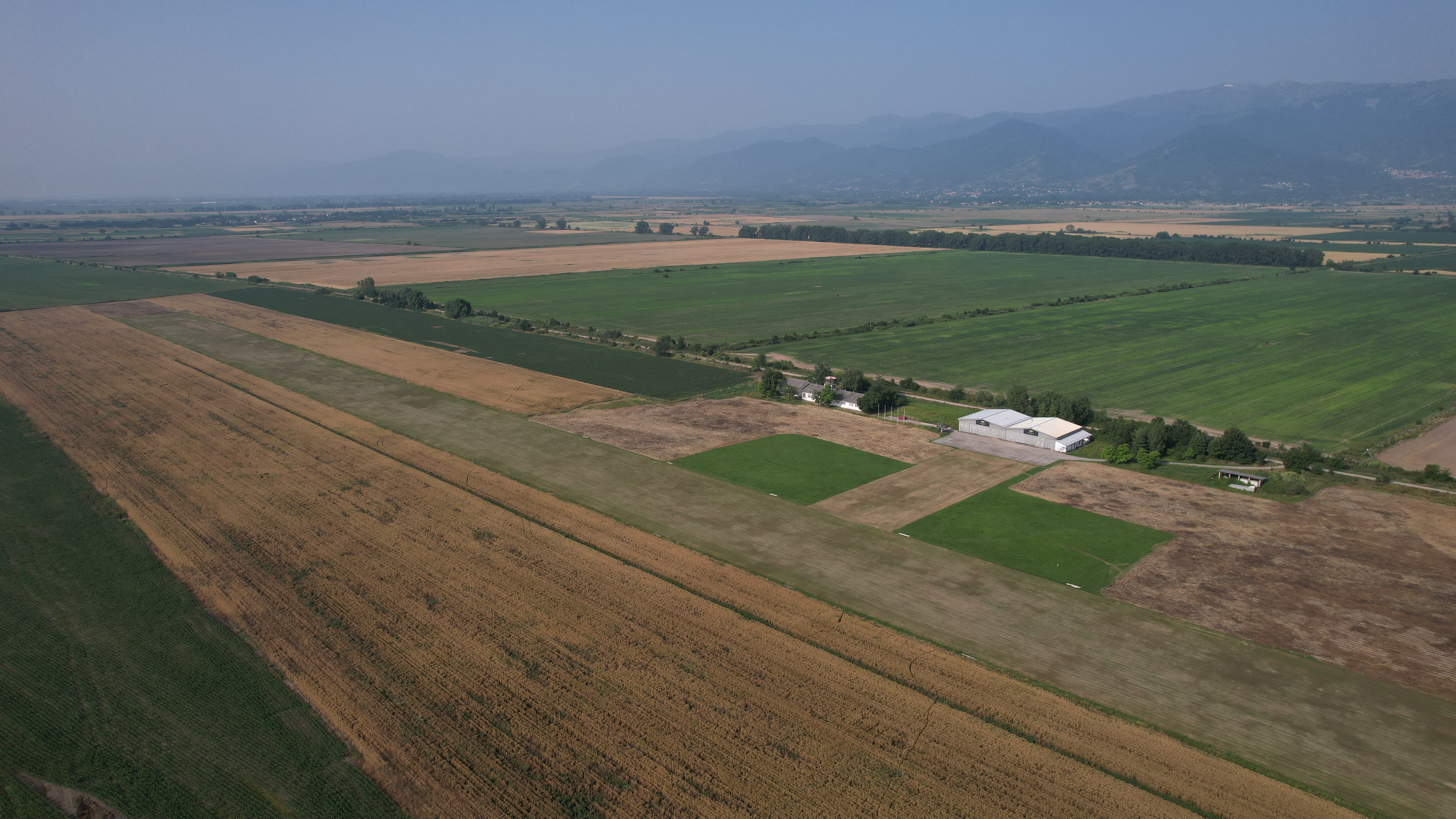
- Air view of the airfield
- IATA: none; ICAO: LWBT

Summary
- Airport type: Active with few facilities
- Owner/Operator: Government of North Macedonia
- Serves: Bitola, North Macedonia
- Location: Logovardi
- Elevation AMSL: 1,950 ft / 594 m
- Coordinates: 41°01′24.76″N 021°25′32.10″E
- Interactive map of Аеродром Логоварди; Logovardi Airfield

Runways
Direction	Length		Surface
Direction	ft	m	Surface
17R/35L	1,000	305	Concrete
17L/35R	3,937	1,200	Grass

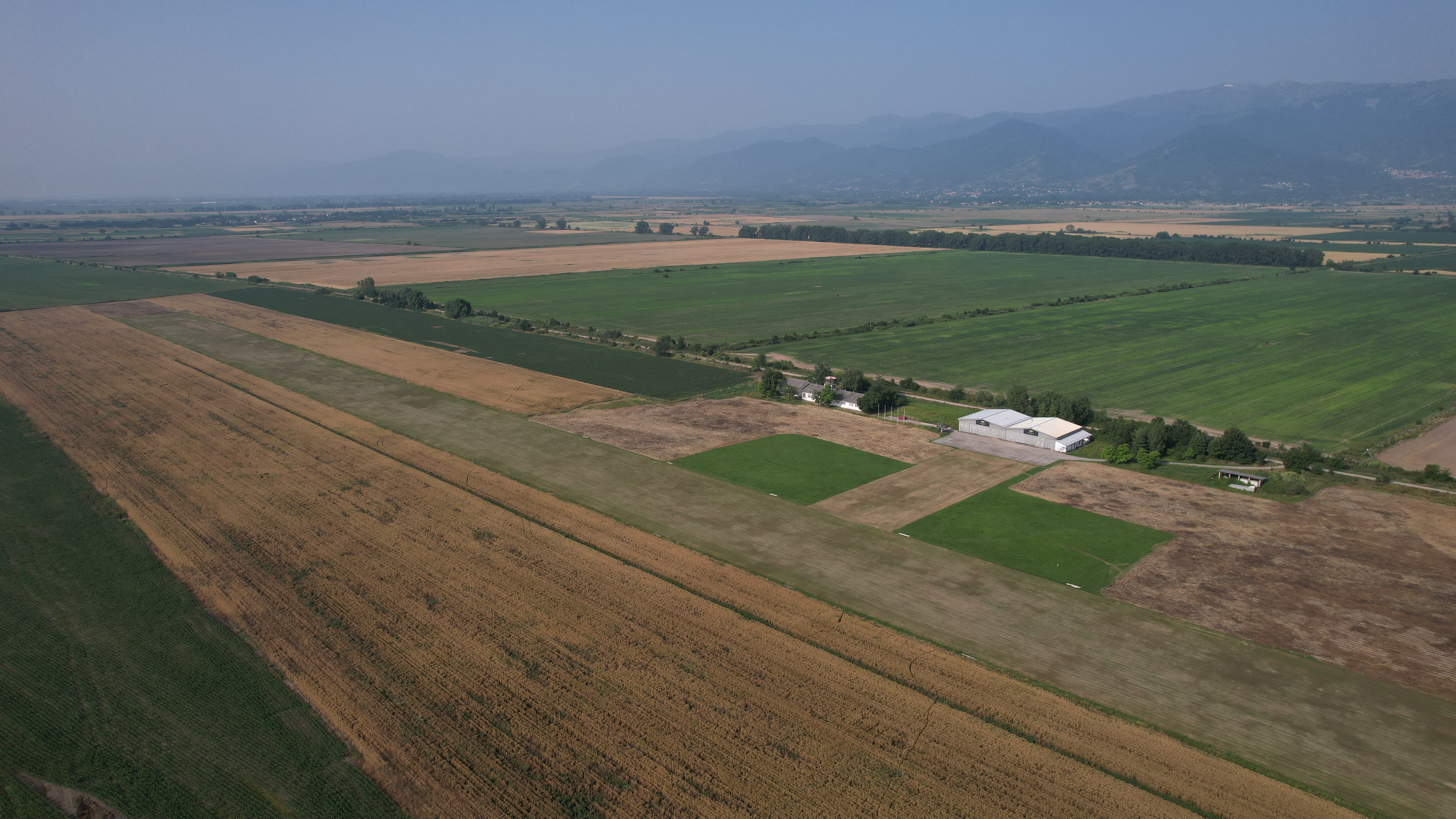

Logovardi Airfield (Macedonian: Аеродром Логоварди, romanized: Aerodrom Logovardi) is an aerodrome located in Bitola, North Macedonia.

== Service ==
On 23 July 2007, the Logovardi airfield was used as a base for firefighting to combat wildfires within the region.

In the 1970s and 1980s, the Aero Club Mirko Todorovski hosted a popular air show each May. The airshow ended, however, after the breakup of Yugoslavia. On 24 May 2008, after 20 years of inactivity, the field was reopened as a gathering spot for air enthusiasts from across Macedonia. The annual air show has since been resumed by Mirko Todorovski. The most recent of these performances was the Bitola and Bitola Air Race which took place on 9 September 2011.

== History ==
In 1935, Aeroput added a stop in Bitola on Sundays to the Belgrade-Skopje-Thessaloniki line with a Spartan Cruiser II plane.
