= Čepigovo =

Čepigovo / Chepigovo Чепигово
- Village
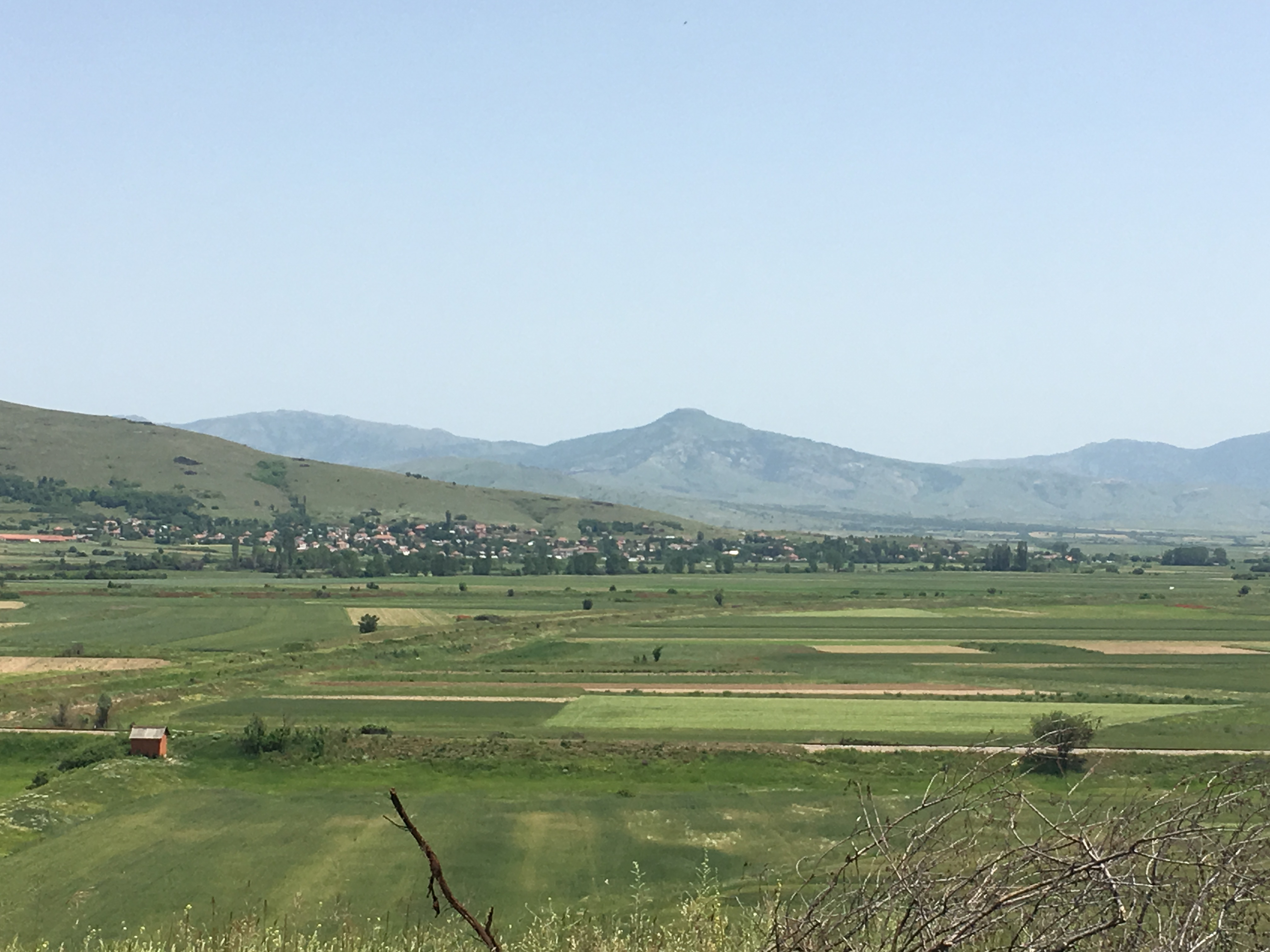

- Location within North Macedonia
- Country: North Macedonia
- Region: Pelagonia
- Municipality: Prilep
- Elevation: 750 m (2,460 ft)

Population (2021)
  - Total: 149
- Time zone: UTC+1 (CET)
- Postal code: 7524
- Area code: +389484XXXXX

Čepigovo is a village in Municipality of Prilep, North Macedonia.

== Geography and location ==
The village is located in Prilep valley, of the broader Pelagonia valley, located 22.5 km southwest of Prilep.

== History ==
Close to the village are the remains of the ancient city of Stibera, which existed from the 3rd century BC, until the 3rd century AD.

The village is mentioned in the Turkish census books from 1467/68, as part of the Vilayet-I Prilepe, under the name Čapugo, where 50 families and 2 unmarried men lived, all Christians.

It used to be part of the former municipality of Topolčani.

== Demographics ==
According to the 2002 census, the village had a total of 162 inhabitants.

Ethnic groups in the village include:

- Macedonians 160
- Others 2

The following table is a summary of the demographics 1900-2002:

Year	1900	1905	1948	1953	1961	1971	1981	1991	1994	2002
Population	73	80	146	188	216	197	218	186	167	162

=== Families ===
All of the families have settled from elsewhere:

Debresliovci, settled from Debrešte in the 19th century; Bilevci, and Rtovci, formerly a single family, settled in the 19th century from the village of Poeševo, near Bitola; Marijovci, settled from a village in Mariovo; Belocrkvanci, settled after 1912 from the village of Bela Crkva, there they were named Prčkovci; Ilinci, settled from Ilino (Golemo or Malo); and Smilevci, settled from Babino, near Demir Hisar.
