= Gaius Carvilius =

2nd-century BC man of Spoletium

Gaius Carvilius of Spoletium was at the town of Uscana, when the Roman garrison there was besieged by Perseus in 169 B.C. Once it became apparent that there were not enough supplies in the town to withstand a siege, the garrison sent Carvilius, together with Gaius Afranius, to negotiate a surrender.

Perseus promised to allow the Romans to leave with their arms and liberty, but upon their surrender, he deprived them of both, took the townspeople into custody, and sold them into bondage. Despite this duplicity, Perseus was able to use Carvilius in subsequent negotiations for the surrender of other towns, where Carvilius admitted that neither he nor his comrades had been harshly treated.

== See also ==
- Carvilia (gens)
