= Korenica, Krivogaštani =

Korenica Кореница
- Village
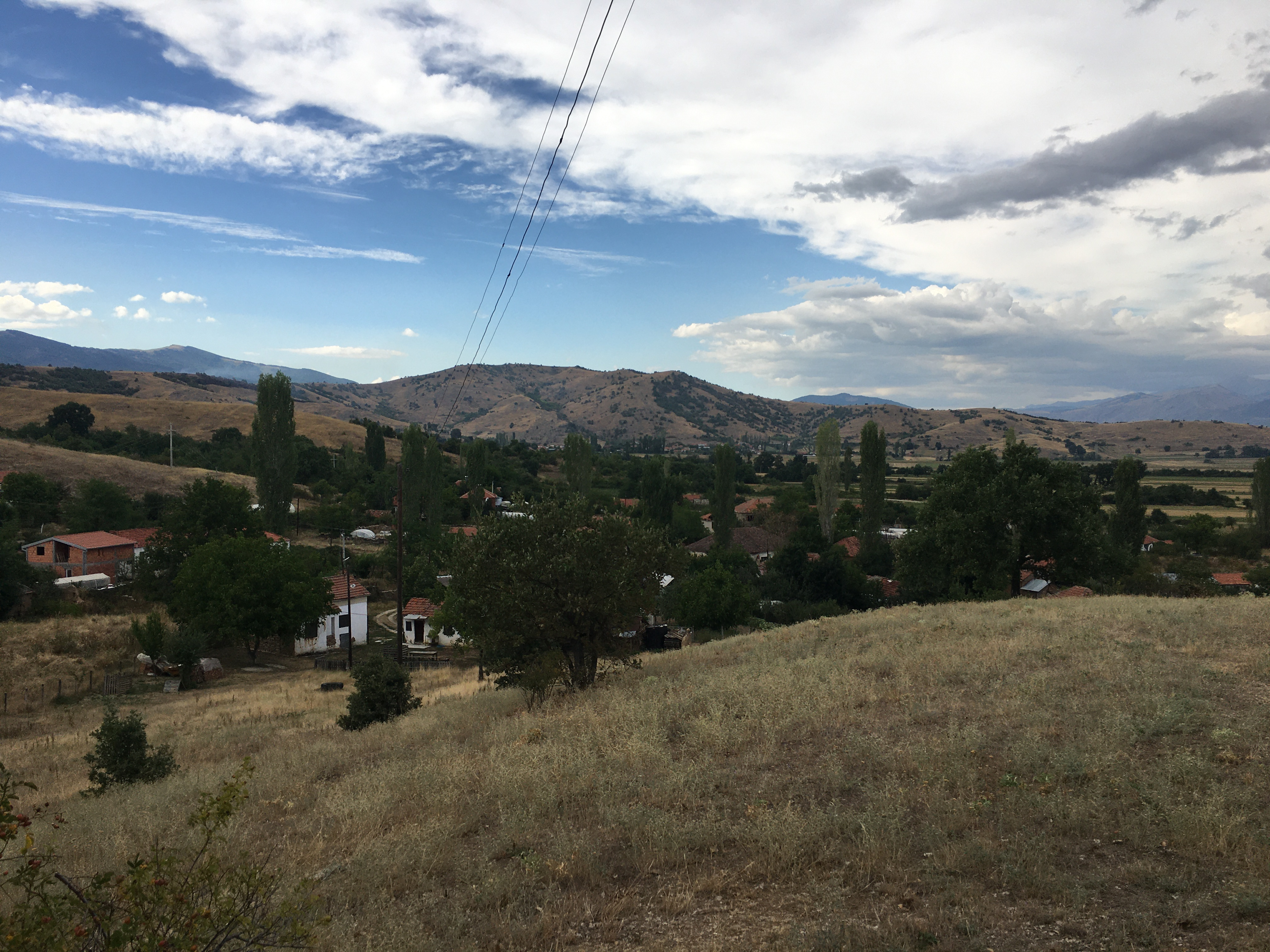
- View of the village

- Location within North Macedonia
- Country: North Macedonia
- Region: Pelagonia
- Municipality: Krivogaštani
- Elevation: 572 m (1,877 ft)

Population (2002)
  - Total: 62
- Time zone: UTC+1 (CET)
- Area code: +38948

Korenica (Macedonian: Кореница) is a village in Municipality of Krivogaštani.

== Demographics ==
According to the 2002 census, the village had a total of 62 inhabitants. Ethnic groups in the village include:

- Macedonians 62
