= Božić (mythology) =

Creature in Slavic paganism

Bozić in Slavic paganism is a creature symbolizing the New Year, spring and youth. It appears in Christmas customs accompanied by a golden-horned deer and a pig, as opposed to Badnjak. In the languages of the South Slavs, the word was transferred to the modern name of Christmas, e.g. Serbian Божић, Croatian Božić and Slovenian Božič. The figure of Bozić is probably an echo of the cult of Svarog. Bozić is the personification of the sun, which allegedly dies and is born every year (similar to the ancient Roman oriental cult of Sol Invictus). Features of the cult of Christmas are transferred to the Christian religion: the Serbs, Croats, Slovenes call the holiday "Christmas" Christ "Christmas", the Bulgarians - "Christmas".
