= Grazhdan Castle =

Castle in Albania

Coordinates: 41°36′22″N 20°27′57″E

The Grazhdan castle is found near Peshkopi in northern Albania.

== Description ==
The castle is located around 15 km southeast of Peshkopi, on a terrace between the streams of Grazhdan and Maqellara. The castle was built in Late Antiquity around the time of Constantine the Great, rebuilt with a smaller wall around the time of Justinian I, and was strategically located where a branch of Via Egnatia met the Lissus–Naissus road. It is near the Black Drin Valley in a region where a line of late Roman forts is found and of which Grazhdan is the largest. The walls encircled a surface of 34 hectares and were built of irregular stonework and bricks. They were 3.2 m thick and reached a length of around 3 km. There were 3 large gates and 44 towers of various shapes. One tower was turned into a small church in the Middle Ages. A cemetery was built in the former gate area and functioned in the 11th-12th century period.

Johann Georg von Hahn was the first to write about the castle. Later in 1975 Apollon Baçe made a survey, and Luan Përzhita in 2001 started excavations.

The castle has been connected to various settlements attested in ancient writings, specifically Dobera, Deuphracus mentioned by Procopius and Uscana.

== See also ==
- List of castles in Albania
