= Karamani (village) =

Karamani Карамани
- Village
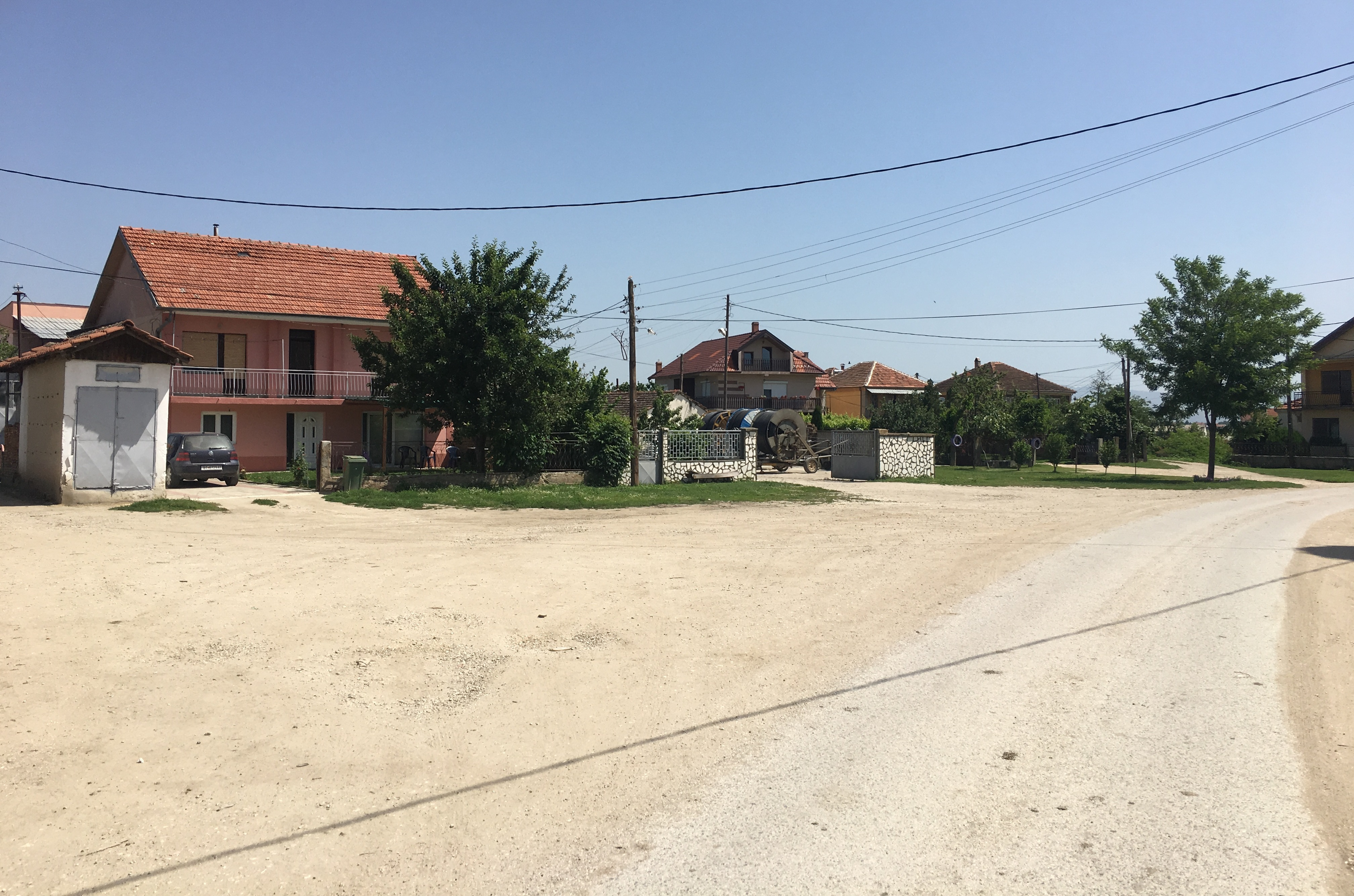
- Center of the village

- Location within North Macedonia
- Country: North Macedonia
- Region: Pelagonia
- Municipality: Bitola

Population (2002)
  - Total: 337
- Time zone: UTC+1 (CET)
  - Summer (DST): UTC+2 (CEST)

Karamani (Macedonian: Карамани) is a village in the Bitola Municipality of North Macedonia.

== Demographics ==
Karamani is attested in the Ottoman defter of 1467/68 as a village in the vilayet of Manastir. The inhabitants attested bore Slavic and mixed Slavic-Albanian anthroponyms, such as Gjon, son of Božić, Nikola, son of Gjin, Pula (widowed).

According to the 2002 census, the village had a total of 337 inhabitants. Ethnic groups in the village include:

- Macedonians 337
