= FK Sloga 1976 Lažani =

Sloga 1976 Lažani
- Full name: Fudbalski klub Sloga 1976 Lažani
- Founded: 1976; 50 years ago
- Chairman: Ermin Kolashinac
- 2025–26: Third League (South), 14th (withdraw)

FK Sloga 1976 Lažani (Macedonian: ФК Слога 1976 Лажани) is a football club of the Bosniak community based in the village of Lažani near Prilep, North Macedonia. They were recently competed in the Macedonian Third League (South Division).

== History ==
The club was founded in 1976. They played in the OFS Prilep Division A 2018–19 seasons, finishing 2nd and were recently promoted to Macedonian Third League.
