= Penestai =

Thessalian labourers

The penestai or penestae (Greek: oἱ πενέσται, hoi penéstai) were a class of unfree labourers in Thessaly, Ancient Greece. These labourers were tied to the land they inhabited, comparable in status with the Spartan helots.

== Status ==
Tradition made the penestae descendants of the Achaeans subjected by invading tribes arriving from Thesprotia. Archemachus (cited by Athenaeus, VI, 264), a 3rd-century BC writer, believed instead that they were Boeotians:

The Aeolian Boeotians who did not emigrate when their country Thessaly was conquered by the Thessalians, surrendered themselves to the victors on condition that they should not be carried out of the country, nor be put to death, but should cultivate the land for the new owners of the soil, paying by way of rent a portion of the produce of it, and many of them are richer than their masters.

The Thessalian lands were very productive and spacious with a low population density; the penestae thus had large amounts of rich land to cultivate. The contributions given to the Thessalians and Archemachus' remark about their wealth imply that the penestae could freely dispose of the portions in excess of their rent payments and that they could possess goods. Certain penestae, known as latreis, worked as house servants, receiving a salary in exchange.

Dionysius of Halicarnassus mentions (II, 9) that disobedient penestae were beaten and that generally speaking, they were treated like chattel slaves. They appear to have been much less numerous than the free Thessalians.

From a passage in Demosthenes, it appears that the penestae sometimes accompanied their masters to battle, and fought on horseback as their knights or vassals. The penestae of Thessaly also resembled the Spartan helots in another respect for they often rose up in arms against their lords.

There was also an Illyrian tribe was called "Penestae".

== See also ==
- Slavery in ancient Greece
