= Godivje =

Godivje Годивје
- Village
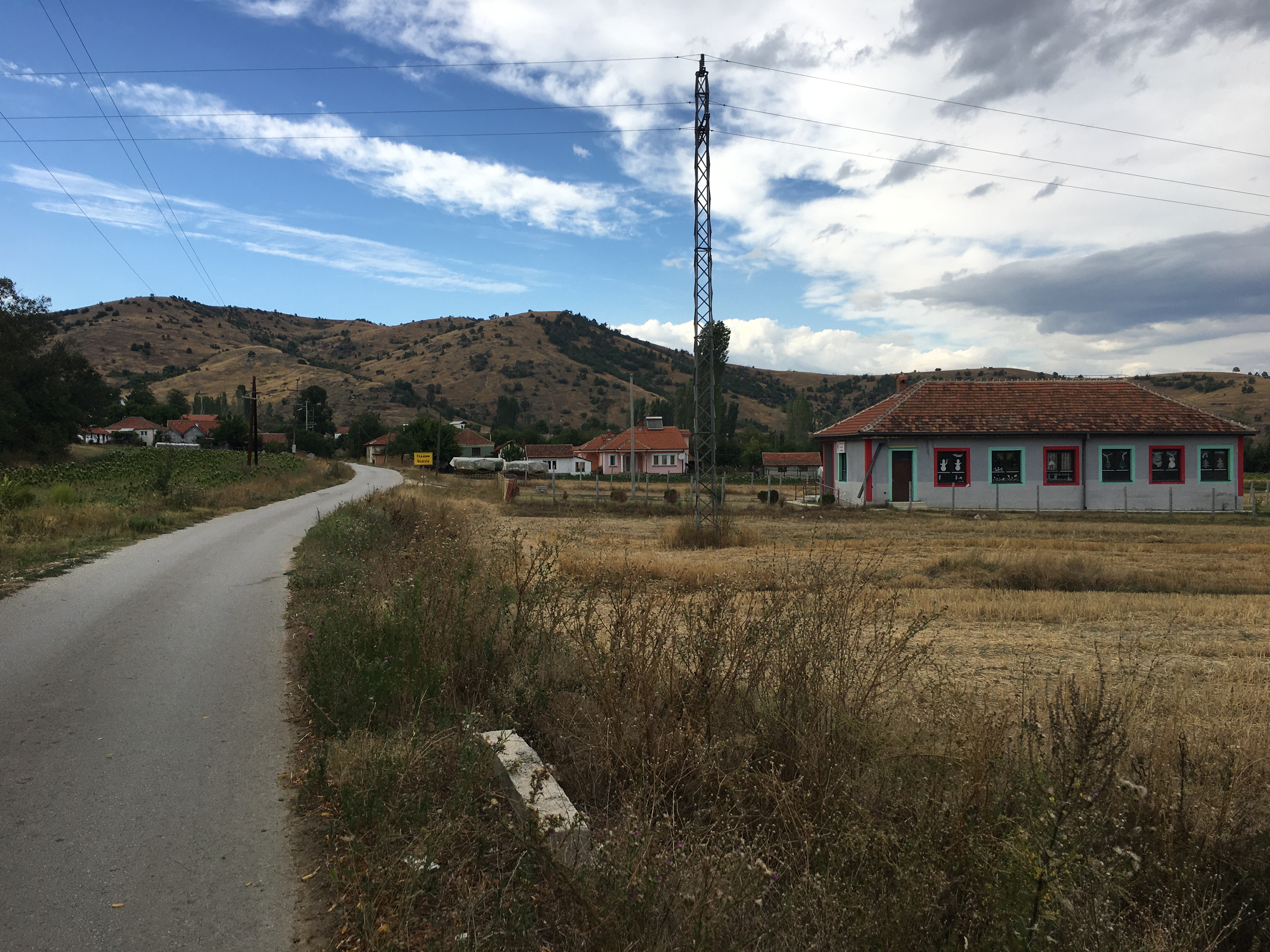
- View of the village

- Location within North Macedonia
- Country: North Macedonia
- Region: Pelagonia
- Municipality: Krivogaštani
- Elevation: 580 m (1,900 ft)

Population (2002)
  - Total: 166
- Time zone: UTC+1 (CET)
- Area code: +38948

Godivje (Macedonian: Годивје) is a village in Municipality of Krivogaštani.

== Demographics ==
According to the 2002 census, the village had a total of 166 inhabitants. Ethnic groups in the village include:

- Macedonians 165
- Serbs 1
