= Badnjak =

Badnjak may refer to:

- Badnjak (Serbian), a Christmas tradition in Serbia
- Badnjak (Croatian), a Christmas tradition in Croatia
