= Debrešte =

Debrešte Debrešte Debreshtë
- Village
- Дебреште
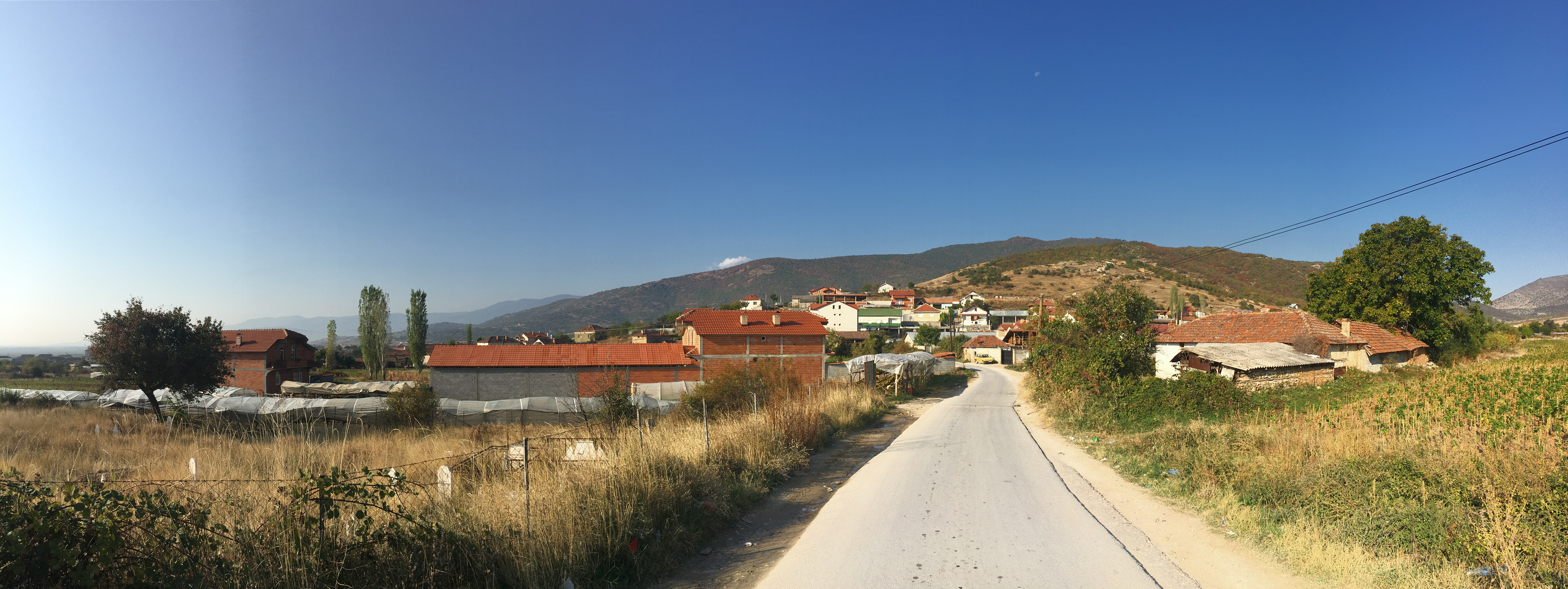
- Skyline of Debrešte

- Location within North Macedonia
- Coordinates: 41°28′46″N 21°18′55″E
- Country: North Macedonia
- Region: Pelagonia
- Municipality: Dolneni
- Elevation: 629 m (2,064 ft)

Population (2021)
  - Total: 2,600
- Time zone: UTC+1 (CET)
  - Summer (DST): UTC+2 (CEST)
- Postal code: 7537
- Area code: +38948
- Car plates: PP
- Website: .

Debrešte (Macedonian: Дебреште, Albanian: Debreshtë) is a village in a highland area in the municipality of Dolneni, North Macedonia. It is the largest settlement in the municipality in terms of population.

== Demographics ==
On the Ethnographic Map of the Bitola Vilayet of the Cartographic Institute in Sofia from 1901, Debreshte appears as a Turkish village in the Prilep kaza, having 148 houses.

In the second half of the 20th century Debrešte was inhabited by a Turkish population. Between 1954 - 1960 large scale migration from Debrešte by Turks to Turkey occurred, while Orthodox Macedonians from the Poreče region and Slavic Muslims from the Sandžak settled in the village. Slavic Muslims from Sandžak, known as Sandžakli settling in Debrešte were not well received by the local population which forced them to move to neighboring villages, mainly to Lažani where their numbers are high. Turks from Debrešte refer to the surrounding Christian population as Makedonci (Macedonians) and those Orthodox Macedonians refer to them as Turci (Turks) due to they being Muslims. The village also has an ethnic Albanian population.

According to the 2021 census, the village had a total of 2.600 inhabitants. Ethnic groups in the village include:

- Turks 1.941
- Albanians 528
- Macedonians 81
- Bosniaks 3
- Others 46

Year	Macedonian	Albanian	Turks	Romani	Vlachs	Serbs	Bosniaks	Others	Total
2002	169	149	2.088	...	...	...	...	18	2.424
2021	81	528	1.941	...	...	...	3	43	2.600
