= Podvis, Krivogaštani =

Podvis Подвис
- Village
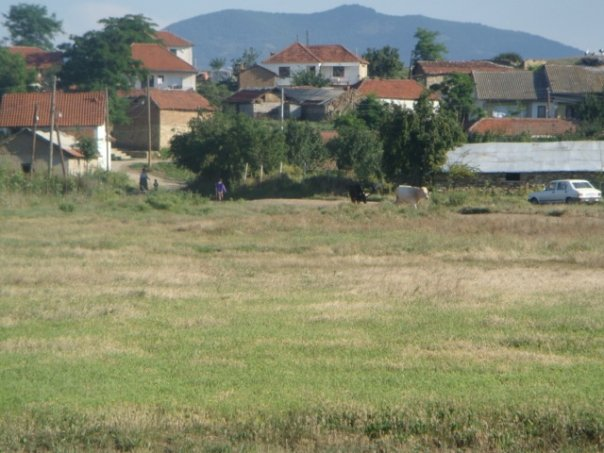

- Location within North Macedonia
- Country: North Macedonia
- Region: Pelagonia
- Municipality: Krivogaštani
- Elevation: 601 m (1,972 ft)

Population (2002)
  - Total: 143
- Time zone: UTC+1 (CET)
- Area code: +38948

Podvis is a village in Municipality of Krivogaštani. Former name: Tursko. It used to be part of the former municipality of Žitoše.

== Demographics ==
According to the 2002 census, the village had a total of 143 inhabitants. Ethnic groups in the village include:

- Macedonians 143
