= Uscana =

Ancient Illyrian settlement

Uscana or Hyscana was a settlement of the Illyrian tribe of the Penestae in southern Illyria. It has been suggested that it is to be identified with Grazhdan Castle, near modern Peshkopi in northern Albania.

== See also ==
- List of settlements in Illyria
