= Belo Pole, Dolneni =

Belo Pole Бело Поле
- Village
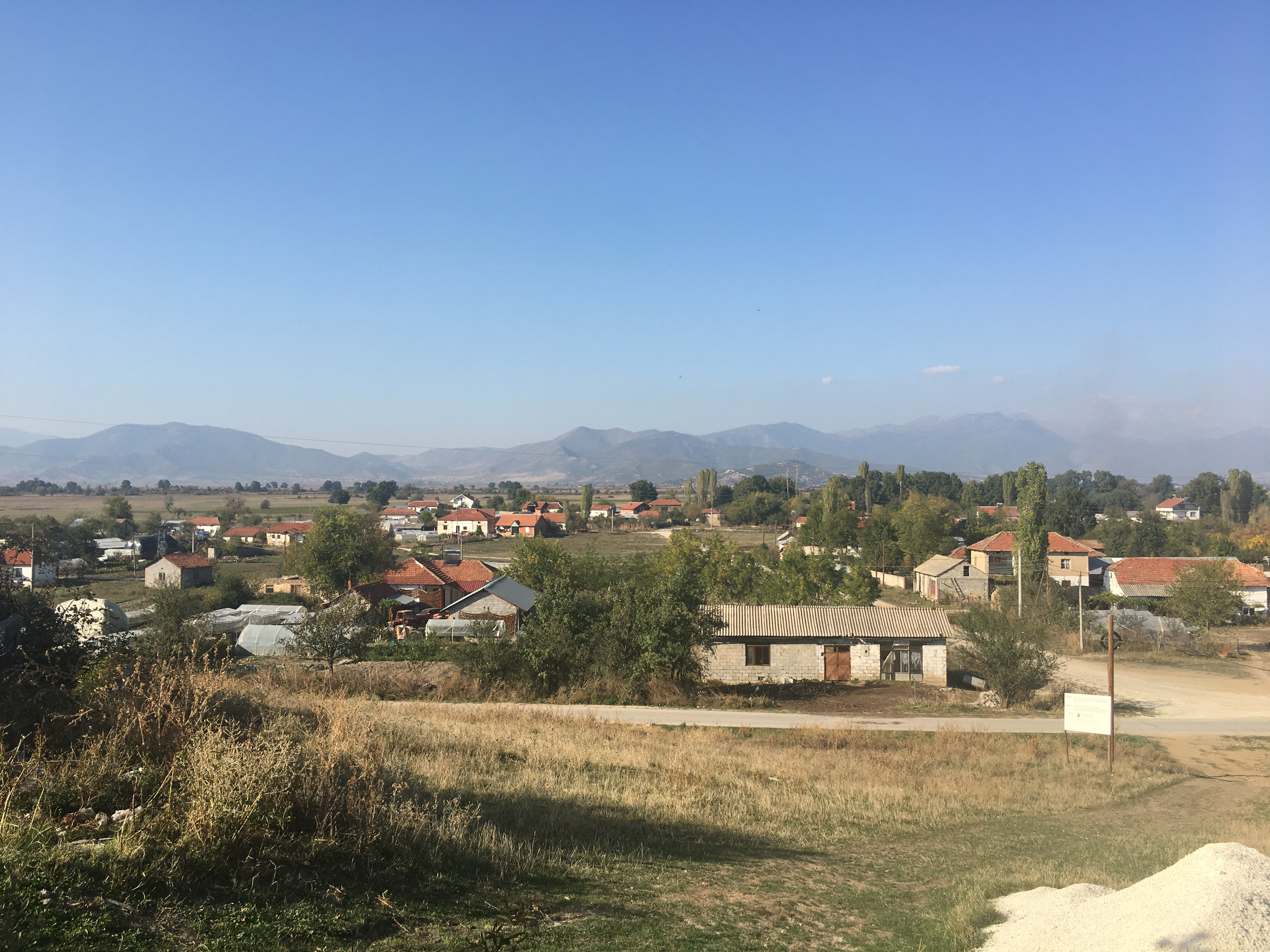

- Location within North Macedonia
- Country: North Macedonia
- Region: Pelagonia
- Municipality: Dolneni
- Elevation: 604 m (1,982 ft)

Population (2021)
  - Total: 174
- Time zone: UTC+1 (CET)
- Area code: +38948

Belo Pole (Macedonian: Бело Поле) is a village in the municipality of Dolneni, North Macedonia.

== Demographics ==
According to the 2021 census, the village had a total of 174 inhabitants. Ethnic groups in the village include:

- Macedonians 166
- Albanians 7
- Others 1

Year	Macedonian	Albanian	Turks	Romani	Vlachs	Serbs	Bosniaks	Persons for whom data are taken from admin. sources	Total
2002	197	...	...	...	...	...	...	...	197
2021	166	7	...	...	...	...	...	1	174
