= Logovardi =

Logovardi Логоварди
- Village
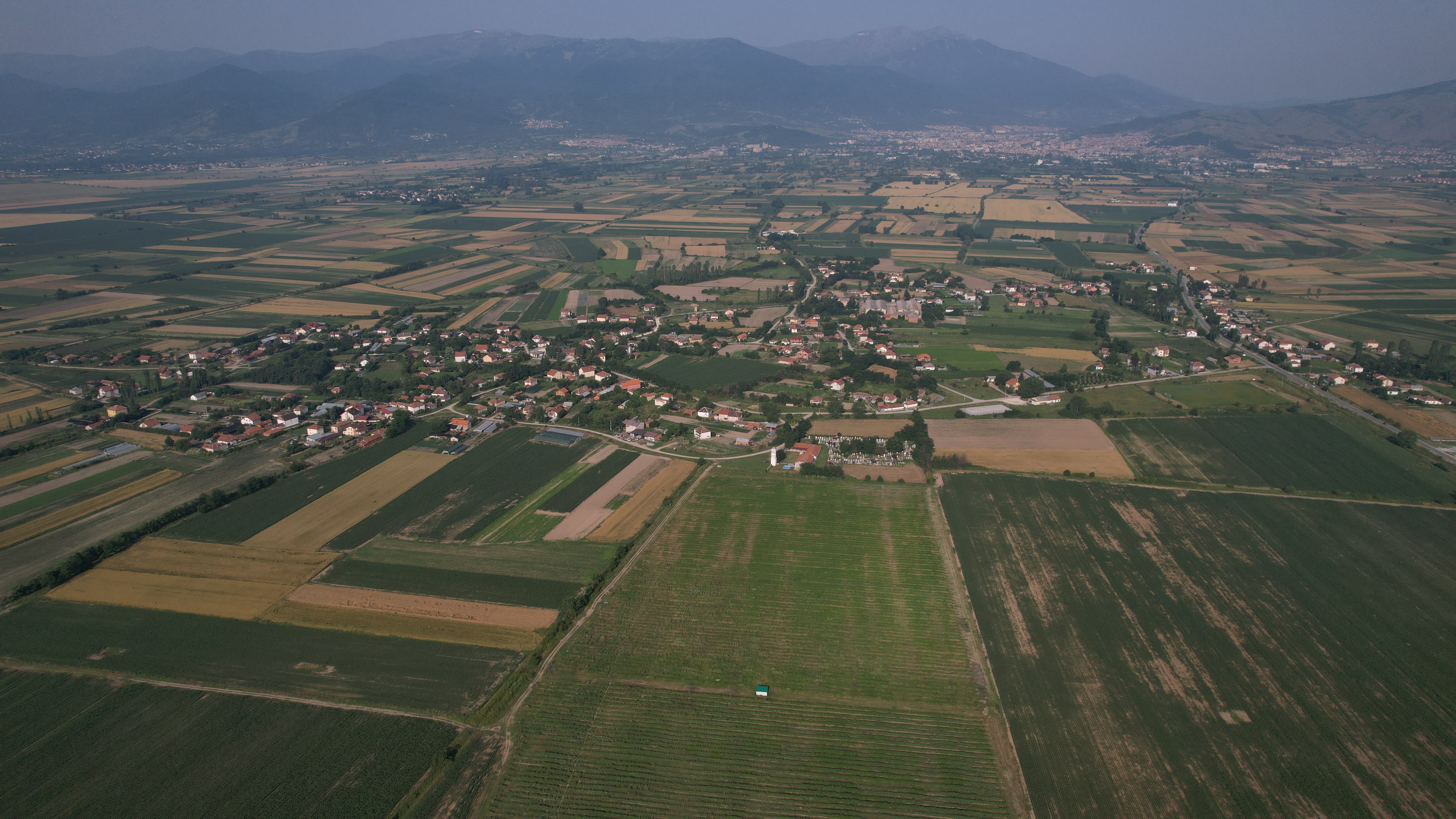
- Air view of the village

- Location within North Macedonia
- Country: North Macedonia
- Region: Pelagonia
- Municipality: Bitola

Population (2002)
  - Total: 699
- Time zone: UTC+1 (CET)
  - Summer (DST): UTC+2 (CEST)

Logovardi (Macedonian: Логоварди) is a village situated in Pelagonia, east of Bitola, North Macedonia.

Located in the village of Logovardi is the cemetery of the buried French soldiers, who died during World War II. France had deployed many soldiers, to help Yugoslavia during the Nazi invasions of Europe.

== History ==
The village started existing in the 19th century, when it was in the Bitola Kaza in the Ottoman Empire.

== Transportation ==
It is also home of Logovardi Airport, the nearest airport to Bitola.

== Sports ==
Local football club FK Evrotip plays in the Macedonian Third League (Southwest Division).

== Demographics ==
According to the census of 2002, of the 699 inhabitants:

- Macedonians - 696
- Serbs - 1
- Others - 2
