= Postal codes in North Macedonia =

Postal codes in North Macedonia are 4 digits in length. They are divided according to post offices at particular regional centers.
