= Obršani =

Obršani Обршани
- Village
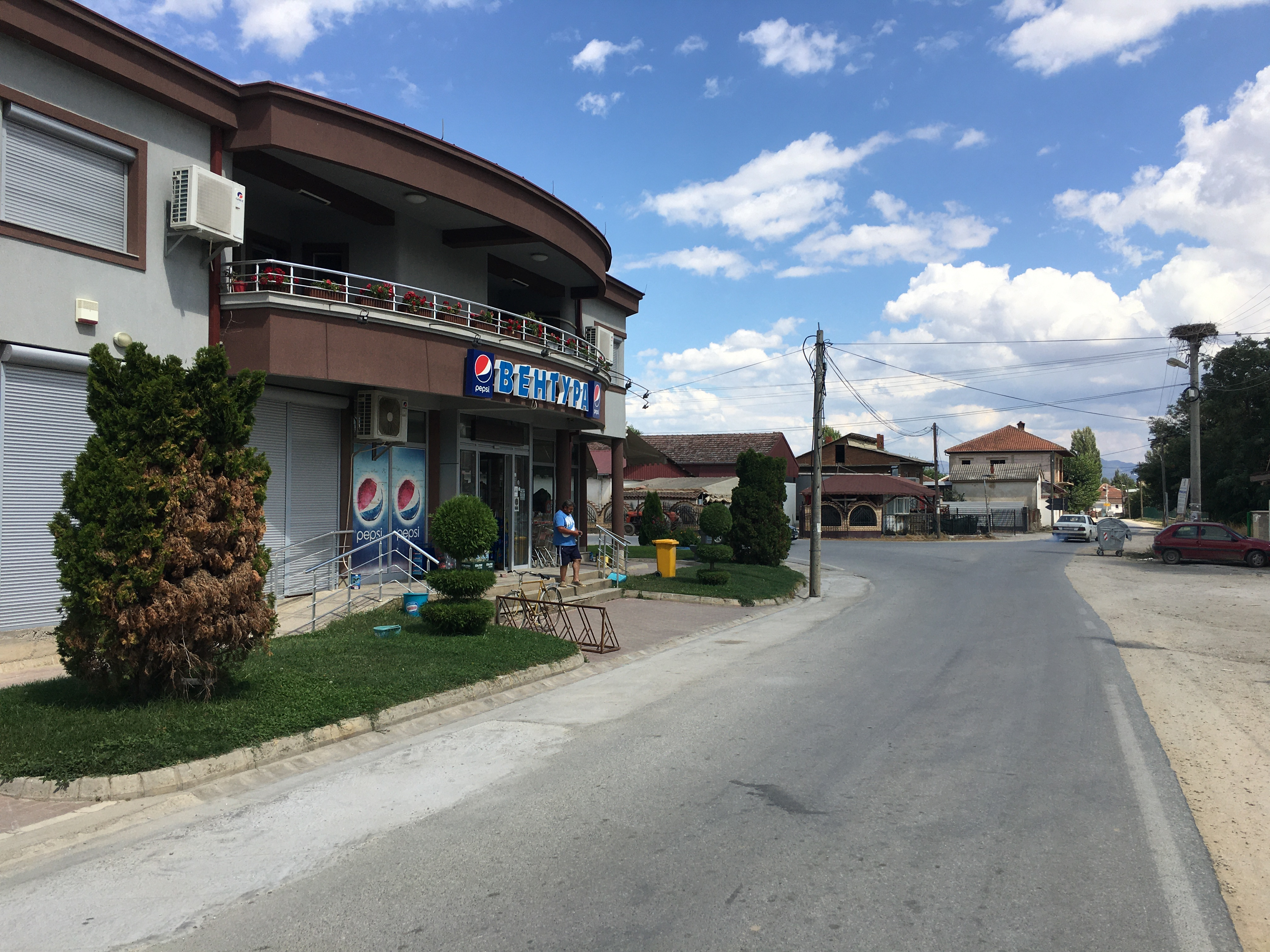
- Street in the village

- Location within North Macedonia
- Country: North Macedonia
- Region: Pelagonia
- Municipality: Krivogaštani
- Elevation: 570 m (1,870 ft)

Population (2002)
  - Total: 793
- Time zone: UTC+1 (CET)
- Area code: +38948

Obršani is a village in Municipality of Krivogaštani, North Macedonia.

== Demographics ==
According to the 2002 census, the village had a total of 793 inhabitants. Ethnic groups in the village include:

- Macedonians 793

== Sports ==
The local football club FK Partizan has played in the Macedonian Second League.
