= Slavej =

Slavej Славеј
- Village
- Location within North Macedonia
- Country: North Macedonia
- Region: Pelagonia
- Municipality: Krivogaštani
- Elevation: 575 m (1,886 ft)

Population (2021)
  - Total: 379
- Time zone: UTC+1 (CET)
- Area code: +38948

Slavej (Macedonian: Славеј) is a village in Municipality of Krivogaštani and was once known as Aleksandrovo.

== Demographics ==
According to the 2002 census, the village had a total of 388 inhabitants. Ethnic groups in the village include:

- Macedonians 381
- Serbs 2
- Others 5
