= Zapolžani =

Zapolžani / Zapolzhani Заполжани
- Village
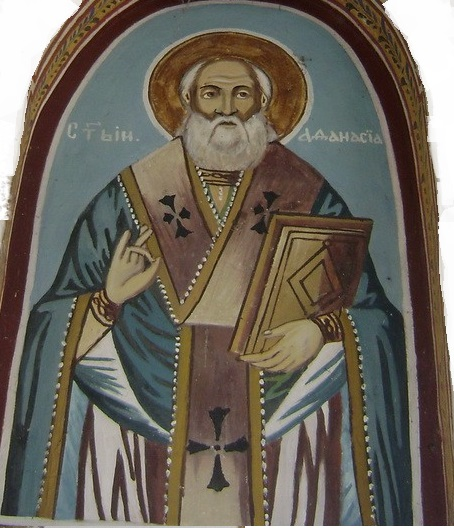
- Fresco at the Church of Saint Athanasius

- Location within North Macedonia
- Country: North Macedonia
- Region: Pelagonia
- Municipality: Dolneni
- Elevation: 599 m (1,965 ft)

Population (2021)
  - Total: 229
- Time zone: UTC+1 (CET)
- Area code: +38948

Zapolzhani (Macedonian: Заполжани) is a village in the municipality of Dolneni, North Macedonia.

== Demographics ==
According to the 1467-68 Ottoman defter, Zapolžani appears being largely inhabited by an Albanian population. The register displayed mixed Albanian and Slavic anthroponymy, with instances of individuals bearing both Slavic and Albanian names. The names are Miladin Gjin-ço, Dimitri Preno (Prenk), Gjergji son of Lazar, Gjin son of Meënko, Dimitri son of Galan (Kalan), Buzaka Ivan-i, Gjon Arbanas (t. Arnaut).

According to the 2021 census, the village had a total of 229 inhabitants. Ethnic groups in the village include:

- Macedonians 218
- Albanians
- Persons for whom data are taken from administrative sources 10

Year	Macedonian	Albanian	Turks	Romani	Vlachs	Serbs	Bosniaks	Persons for whom data are taken from admin. sources	Total
2002	234	...	...	7	...	...	...	...	241
2021	218	1	...	...	...	...	...	10	229
