= Dabjani =

Dabjani Дабјани
- Village
- Location within North Macedonia
- Coordinates: 41.427118°N 21.366554°E
- Country: North Macedonia
- Region: Pelagonia
- Municipality: Dolneni
- Elevation: 594 m (1,949 ft)

Population (2002)
  - Total: 0
- Time zone: UTC+1 (CET)
- Area code: +38946

Dabjani (Macedonian: Дабјани) is an abandoned village in the municipality of Dolneni, North Macedonia. At the start of the 20th century, this village had 130 inhabitants.

== Demographics ==
According to the 2002 census, the village had no permanent inhabitants.
