= Bela Crkva, Krivogaštani =

Bela Crkva Бела Црква
- Village
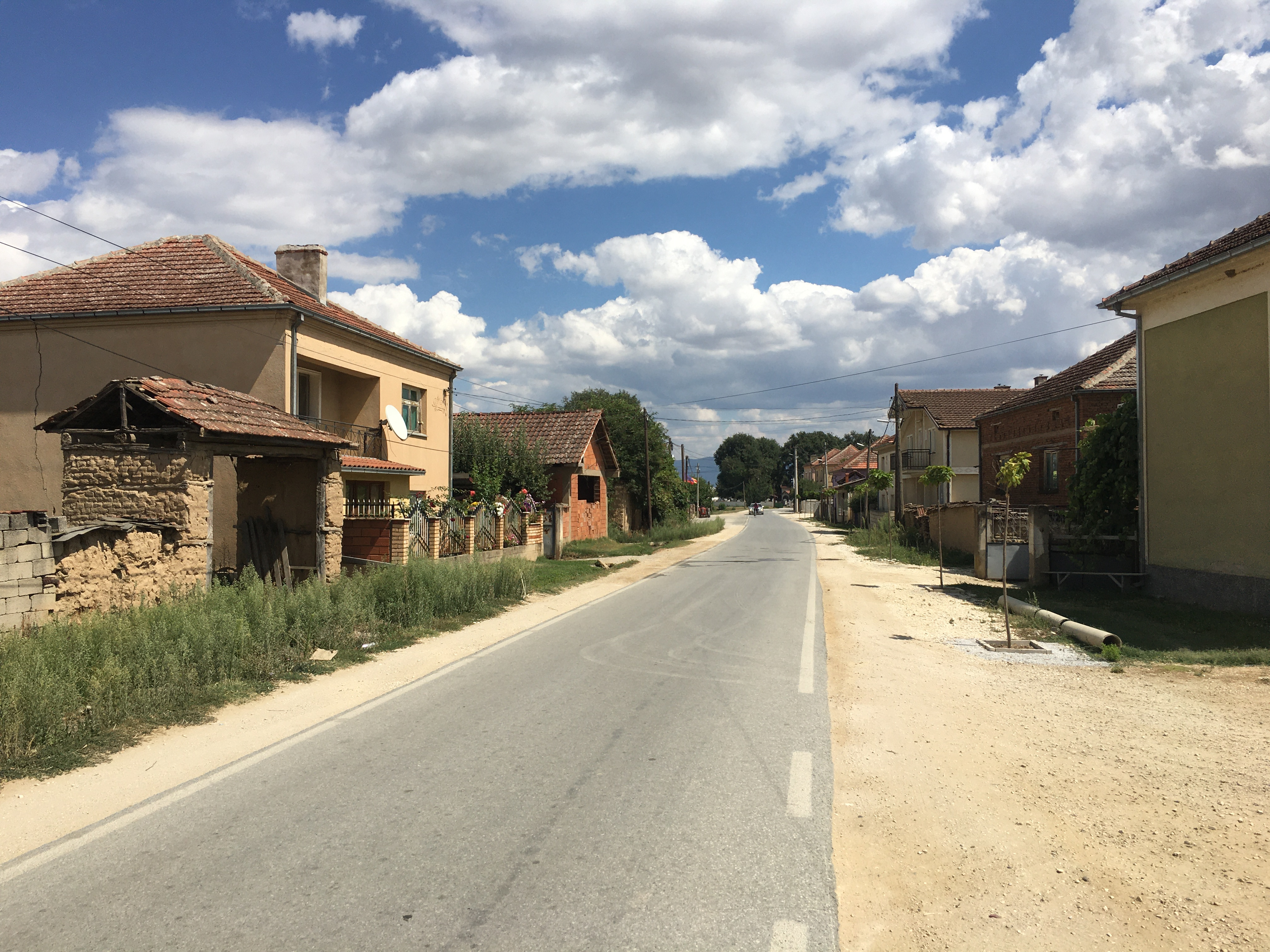
- Regional road 2339 in the village

- Location within North Macedonia
- Country: North Macedonia
- Region: Pelagonia
- Municipality: Krivogaštani
- Elevation: 572 m (1,877 ft)

Population (2002)
  - Total: 498
- Time zone: UTC+1 (CET)
- Area code: +38948

Bela Crkva (Macedonian: Бела Црква; meaning White Church) is a village in the Municipality of Krivogaštani, Prilep Oblast, North Macedonia. It is situated along the main road between Krivogaštani and Demir Hisar.

== Demographics ==
Presil is attested in the Ottoman defter of 1467/68 as a village in the vilayet of Manastir. The majority of the inhabitants attested bore typical Slavic anthroponyms, with a small minority exhibiting Albanian anthroponyms such as Dika and Leko.

According to the 2002 census, the village had a total of 498 inhabitants. Ethnic groups in the village include:

- Macedonians 498
