= Klepač (surname) =

Klepač, Klepáč (Czech/Slovak feminine: Klepáčová), or Klepac is a surname of Slovene, Croatian, Czech, and Slovak origin. Notable people, real and fictional, with the surname include:

- Rudolf Klepač (1913-1994), Croatian bassoonist, bassoon professor, conductor and cultural ambassador
- Andreja Klepač (born 1986), Slovenian tennis player
- Eva Klepáčová (1933–2012), Czech actress
- Mihael Klepač (born 1997), Croatian footballer
- Peter Klepáč (born 1975), Slovak ice hockey player

== Fictional characters ==
- Petar Klepac, West Slavic folklore character

== See also ==
https://hr.wikipedia.org/wiki/Rudolf_Klepa%C4%8D
