= Vrbjani, Mavrovo i Rostuše =

Vrbjani Врбјани Vërbjan
- Village
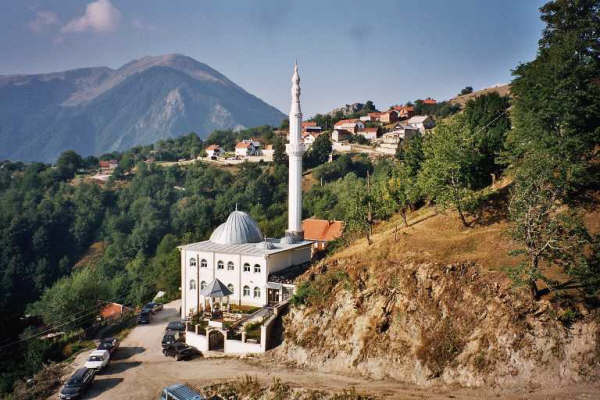
- Vrbjani

- Location within North Macedonia
- Coordinates: 41°41′00″N 20°37′57″E
- Country: North Macedonia
- Region: Polog
- Municipality: Mavrovo and Rostuša

Population (2021)
  - Total: 187
- Time zone: UTC+1 (CET)
  - Summer (DST): UTC+2 (CEST)
- Car plates: GV
- Website: .

Vrbjani (Macedonian: Врбјани, Albanian: Vërbjan) is a village in the municipality of Mavrovo and Rostuša, North Macedonia.

== Demographics ==
Vrbjani (Verbjani) is recorded in the Ottoman defter of 1467 as a village in the ziamet of Reka which was under the authority of Karagöz Bey. The village had a total of 16 households and the anthroponymy attested depicts an almost exclusively Albanian character, with only a single case of Slavicisation in the case of Margjin Popivići:

Gjergj Luçi, Gjonëma Suma, Vasil Suma, Menka Gjeraqi, Vasko Luçi, Margjin Popivići, Mitri Shklavi, Llazar Kalja, Petër Skura, Pal Skura, Shoq Rusi, Kolë Kozani, Petër Reçi, Petër Kalja, Mile Gëraqi, and Tanush Gjeraqi.

According to the 1942 Albanian census, Vrbjani was inhabited by 606 Muslim Albanians.

According to the 2002 census, the village had a total of 625 inhabitants. Ethnic groups in the village include:

- Albanians 622
- Others 3

As of the 2021 census, Vrbjani had 187 residents with the following ethnic composition:

- Albanians 163
- Persons for whom data are taken from administrative sources 24
