= Krivogaštani Municipality =

Municipality of North Macedonia

Coordinates: 41.35°N 21.34°E

Krivogaštani Municipality Општина Кривогаштани
- Municipality
- Flag Coat of arms

- Country: North Macedonia
- Region: Pelagonia
- Municipal seat: Krivogaštani

Government
  - Mayor: Nikolče Miskoski (SDSM)

Area
  - Total: 93.57 km^{2} (36.13 sq mi)

Population
  - Total: 5,167
  - Density: 55.22/km^{2} (143.0/sq mi)
- Time zone: UTC+1 (CET)
- Vehicle registration: PP

Krivogaštani Municipality (Macedonian: Кривогаштани) is a municipality in the western part of North Macedonia. Krivogaštani is also the name of the village where the municipal seat is located. This municipality is part of the Pelagonia Statistical Region.

== Geography ==
The municipality borders the Kruševo Municipality to the west, the Dolneni Municipality to the north, the Prilep Municipality to the east, and the Mogila Municipality to the south.

== Demographics ==
According to the 2021 North Macedonia census, the municipality has 5,167 inhabitants. Ethnic groups in the municipality include:

	2002		2021	
	Number	%	Number	%
TOTAL	6,150	100	5,167	100
Macedonians	6,126	99.61	5,021	97.17
Albanians			7	0.14
Serbs	6	0.1	7	0.14
Roma	8	0.13	4	0.08
Vlachs			1	0.02
Bosniaks			1	0.02
Other / Undeclared / Unknown	10	0.16	15	0.28
Persons for whom data are taken from administrative sources			111	2.15

== Inhabited places ==
The main village of Krivogaštani is located along the main route from Prilep to Kruševo.

Other villages within this municipality include Bela Crkva, Borotino, Godivje, Korenica, Krivogaštani, Krušeani, Obršani, Pašino Ruvci, Podvis, Slavej, Vogjani, and Vrbjani
