= Krivogaštani =

Krivogaštani Кривогаштани
- Village
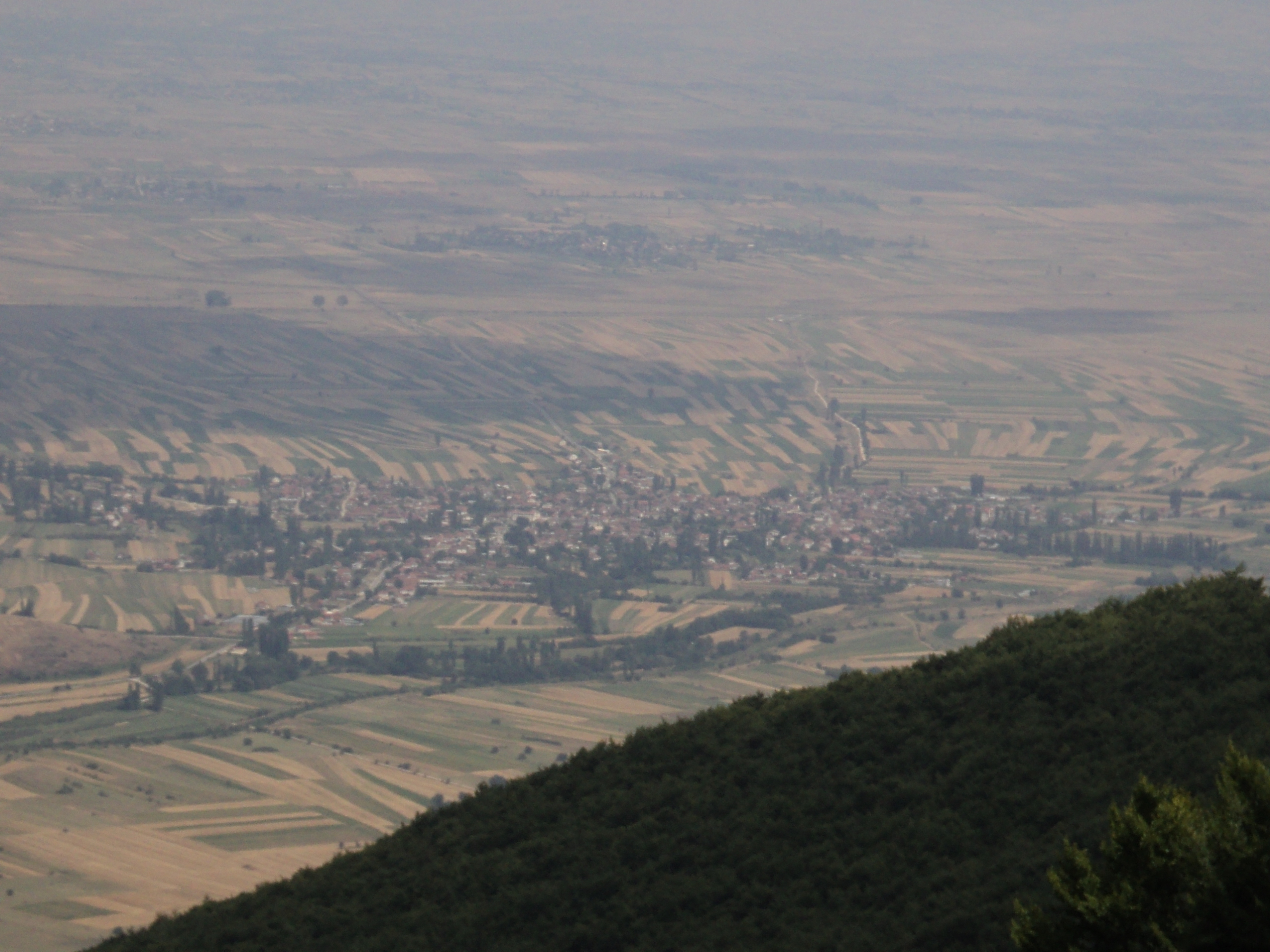

- Location within North Macedonia
- Coordinates: 41°20′09″N 21°19′59″E
- Country: North Macedonia
- Region: Pelagonia
- Municipality: Krivogaštani

Population (2002)
  - Total: 1,870
- Time zone: UTC+1 (CET)
  - Summer (DST): UTC+2 (CEST)
- Vehicle registration: PP

Krivogaštani (Macedonian: Кривогаштани) is a village situated near Prilep on the Pelagonian plain in North Macedonia. The village is the seat of Krivogaštani municipality.

== Demographics ==
According to the 1467-68 Ottoman defter, Krivogaštani appears being largely inhabited by an Albanian population. The register displayed mixed Albanian and Slavic anthroponymy, with instances of individuals bearing both Slavic and Albanian names. The names are: Gjin Arbanas (t.Arnaut), Prono (Projo) his brother, Pejo Marin-i, Martin Kovaç-i, Stepan Berisha, Stala Berisha (Berisha).

According to the 2002 census, the village had a total of 1,870 inhabitants. Ethnic groups in the village include:

- Macedonians 1,860
- Serbs 1
- Romani 8
- Others 1

== Sports ==
Local football club FK Mladost plays in the Macedonian Third League (Center Division).
