= Alinci, Prilep =

Alinci Алинци
- Village
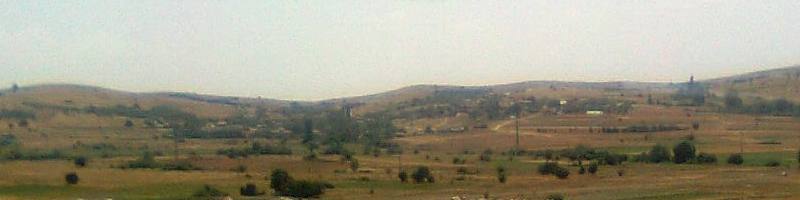
- View of Alinci from Omec Hill

- Location within North Macedonia
- Country: North Macedonia
- Region: Pelagonia
- Municipality: Prilep
- Elevation: 699 m (2,293 ft)

Population (2021)
  - Total: 171
- Time zone: UTC+1 (CET)
- Postal code: 7512
- Area code: +389-48

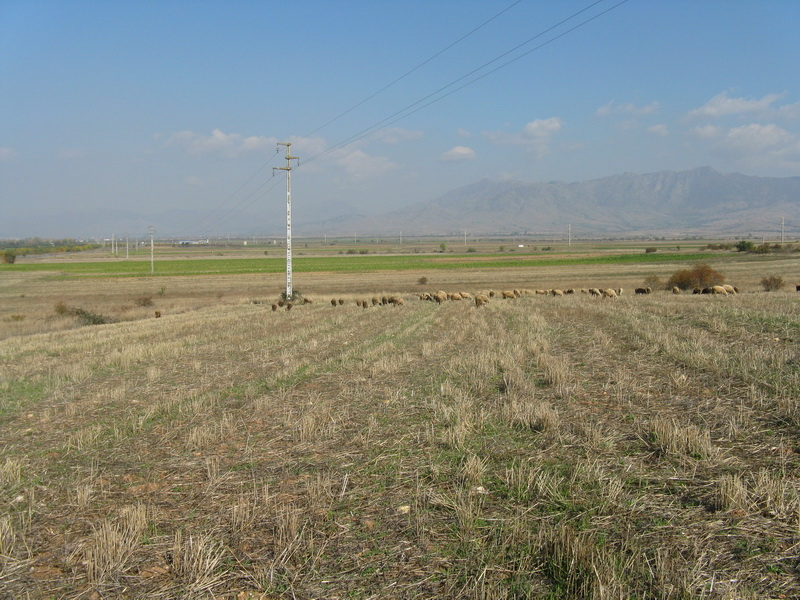
farm area around Alinci

Alinci (Macedonian: Алинци) is a village in the Municipality of Prilep, North Macedonia.

== Geography ==
Alinci is located roughly 13 kilometres south-west from Prilep.

== History ==
In the 19th century, Alinci was a Macedonian village in the Prilep region of the Ottoman Empire. According to the statistics of Vasil Kanchov's book Macedonia: Ethnography And Statistics published in 1900, Alinci had a population of 102 people, all Macedonian Christians.

At the outbreak of the Balkan Wars, a person from Alinci served in the Macedonian-Adrianopolitan Volunteer Corps.

On 6 November 1914, following the Battle of Prilep, the Turkish V Corps of the Vardar Army retreated through Alinci to Bitola.

== Demographics ==
According to the 2002 census, there were 238 people living in the village, all Macedonians.

The Church of the Resurrection of Christ is located in Alinci.
