= Alinci, Mogila =

Alinci Алинци
- Village
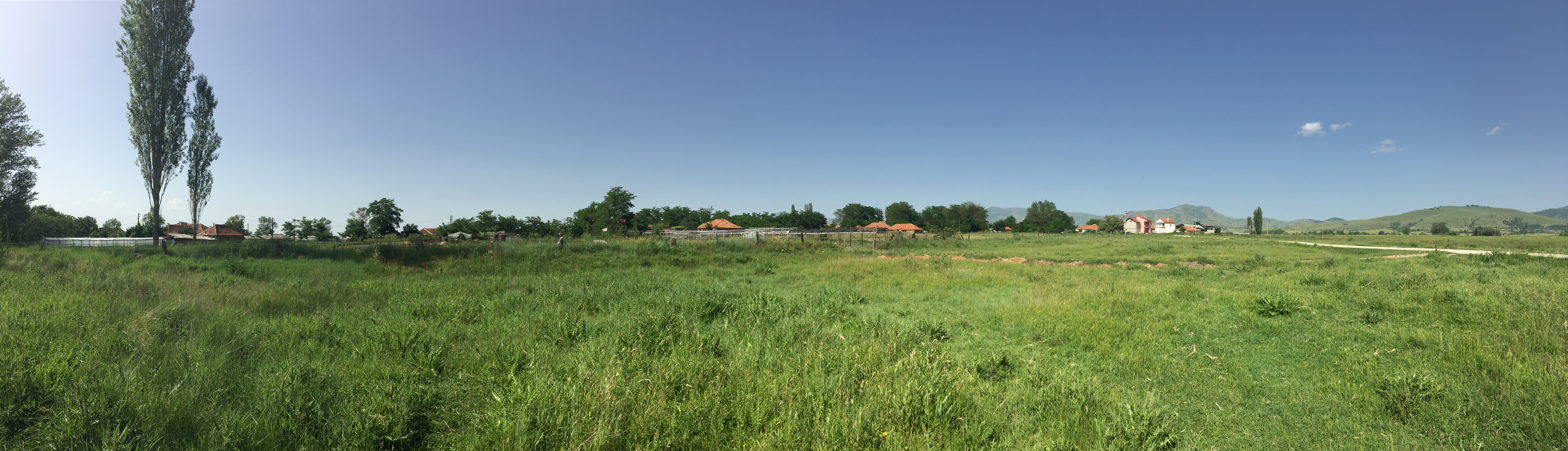
- Panoramic view of the village

- Location within North Macedonia
- Coordinates: 41.151446°N 21.505293°E
- Country: North Macedonia
- Region: Pelagonia
- Municipality: Mogila

Population (2002)
  - Total: 57
- Time zone: UTC+1 (CET)
  - Summer (DST): UTC+2 (CEST)
- Website: .

Alinci (Macedonian: Алинци) is a small village in the municipality of Mogila, North Macedonia. It is between Mogila and Musinci that spreads from the Bitola to the Prilep provence. It used to be part of the former municipality of Dobruševo.

There is a small population in Alinci and a small number of houses than there once were with a bigger population. Alinci also has much produce in the farms such as fruit, vegetable and tobacco. Alinci now has a smaller living population and has more crops growing within the area.

== Demographics ==
Alinci is attested in the Ottoman defter of 1467/68 as a village in the vilayet of Manastir. The inhabitants attested largely bore typical Slavic anthroponyms along with a few instances of Albanian ones, such as Nikolla son of Arbanash or Gon son of Radosllav.

According to the 2002 census, the village had a total of 57 inhabitants. Ethnic groups in the village include:

- Macedonians 57
