= Vrbjani, Krivogaštani =

Vrbjani Врбјани
- Village
- Location within North Macedonia
- Country: North Macedonia
- Region: Pelagonia
- Municipality: Krivogaštani
- Elevation: 573 m (1,880 ft)

Population (2002)
  - Total: 294
- Time zone: UTC+1 (CET)
- Area code: +38948

Vrbjani (Macedonian: Врбјани) is a village in the municipality of Krivogaštani, North Macedonia.

== Demographics ==
According to the 1467-68 Ottoman defter, Vrbjani appears being largely inhabited by an Albanian population. The register displayed mixed Albanian and Slavic anthroponymy, with instances of individuals bearing both Slavic and Albanian names.

The names are: Stanisha Gjergji, Radusha Vlada, Gjino his brother, Dojçin son of Gjergj, Dojçin Petro, Nikola Dibrani, Petro Dibrani, Marin son of Drala, Minço, son in law of Drala, Gjergji unmarried, Dobra Peca (Peci).

According to the 2002 census, the village had a total of 294 inhabitants. Ethnic groups in the village include:

- Macedonians 294
