= Borotino =

Borotino Боротино
- Village
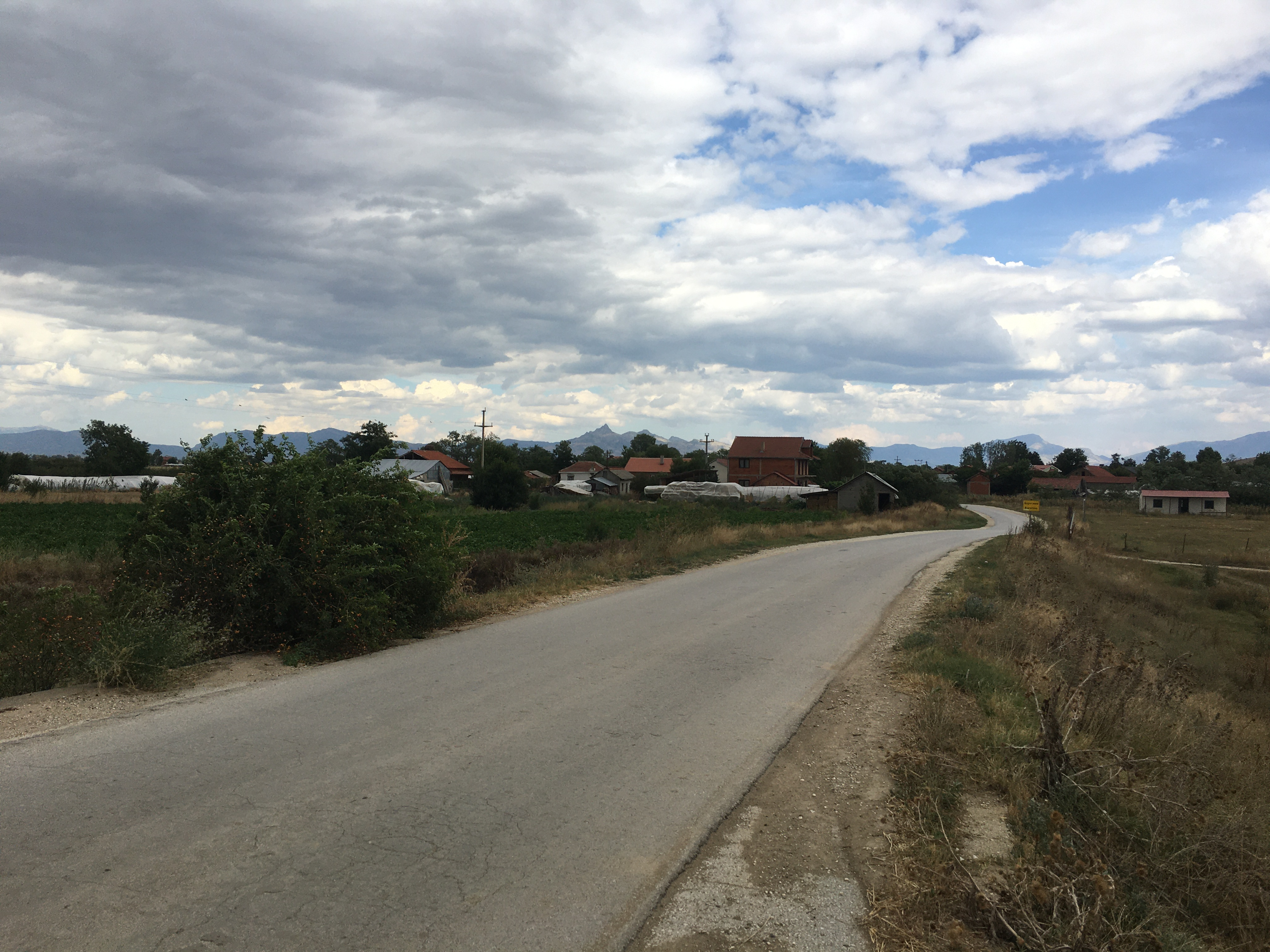
- View of the village

- Location within North Macedonia
- Country: North Macedonia
- Region: Pelagonia
- Municipality: Krivogaštani
- Elevation: 571 m (1,873 ft)

Population (2002)
  - Total: 277
- Time zone: UTC+1 (CET)
- Area code: +38948

Borotino (Macedonian: Боротино) is a village in the Municipality of Krivogaštani in North Macedonia.

== Demographics ==
Borotino is attested in the Ottoman defter of 1467/68 as a village in the vilayet of Manastir. The inhabitants attested primarily bore Christian Slavic anthroponyms, although with one instance of the Albanian personal name Gjergj: Bojo son of Gjergj.

According to the 2002 census, the village had a total of 277 inhabitants. Ethnic groups in the village include:

- Macedonians 277
