= Archemachus of Euboea =

Ancient Greek writer

Archemachus or Archemacchus (Ancient Greek: Ἀρχέμαχoς) was an ancient Greek writer who wrote on his native island (Euboea). His works consisted of at least three books. Whether this Archemachus was the author of the grammatical work Metonyms (Aἱ Μετωνυμίαι, Hai Metonymiai), is uncertain.

== Sources ==
- Smith, William (editor); Dictionary of Greek and Roman Biography and Mythology, "Archemachus", Boston, (1867)
