= Malo Konjari =

Malo Konjari Мало Коњари
- Village
- Location within North Macedonia
- Country: North Macedonia
- Region: Pelagonia
- Municipality: Prilep
- Elevation: 591 m (1,939 ft)

Population (2002)
  - Total: 727
- Time zone: UTC+1 (CET)
- Postal code: 7512
- Area code: +389/48/4XXXXX

Malo Konjari is a village in Municipality of Prilep, North Macedonia. The village has a sports airfield build whilst the village was part of Yugoslavia.

== Demographics ==
According to the 2002 census, the village had a total of 727 inhabitants. Ethnic groups in the village include:

- Macedonians 723
- Serbs 2
- Others 2

== Sports ==
Local football club FK Mlekar plays in the OFS Prilep Division B.
