= Stymbara (Macedonia) =

Ancient town in Macedonia

- Στύμβαρα (Ancient Greek)
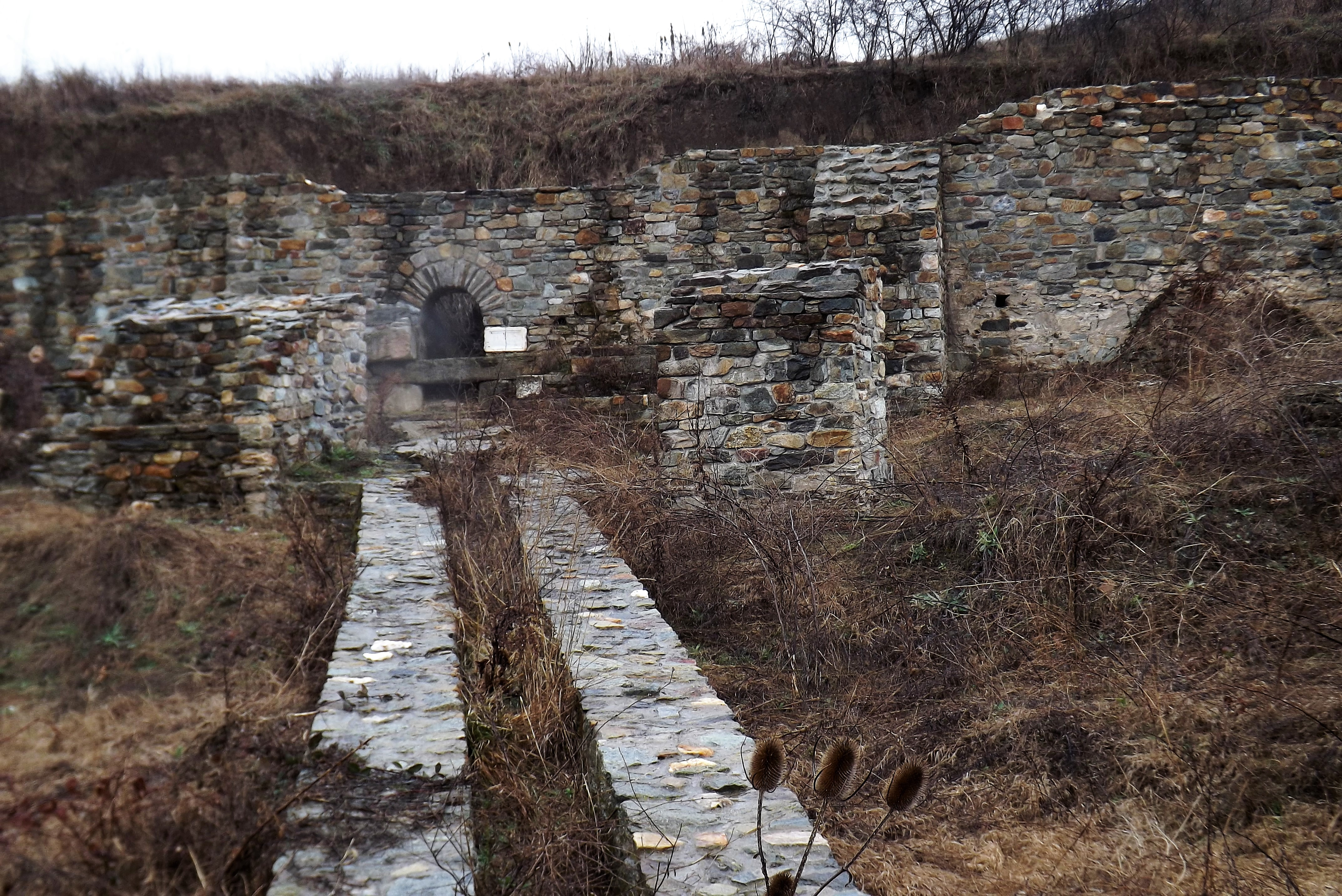
- The ruins of Stymbara
- Interactive map of Stymbara
- 41°14′37″N 21°23′51″E

Stymbara (Ancient Greek: Στύμβαρα), also known as Stuberra (Στυβέρρα) or Stubera, was a town of Deuriopus, a subdivision of Pelagonia, on the frontier of Macedonia.

In a Roman campaign of 200 BCE during the First Macedonian War, it was the third encampment of the consul Sulpicius. It was also the scene of action during the Third Macedonian War. The site of Stymbara is near the modern Čepigovo, in North Macedonia.

== See also ==
- Paeonia
