= Klepač, North Macedonia =

Klepač Клепач
- Village
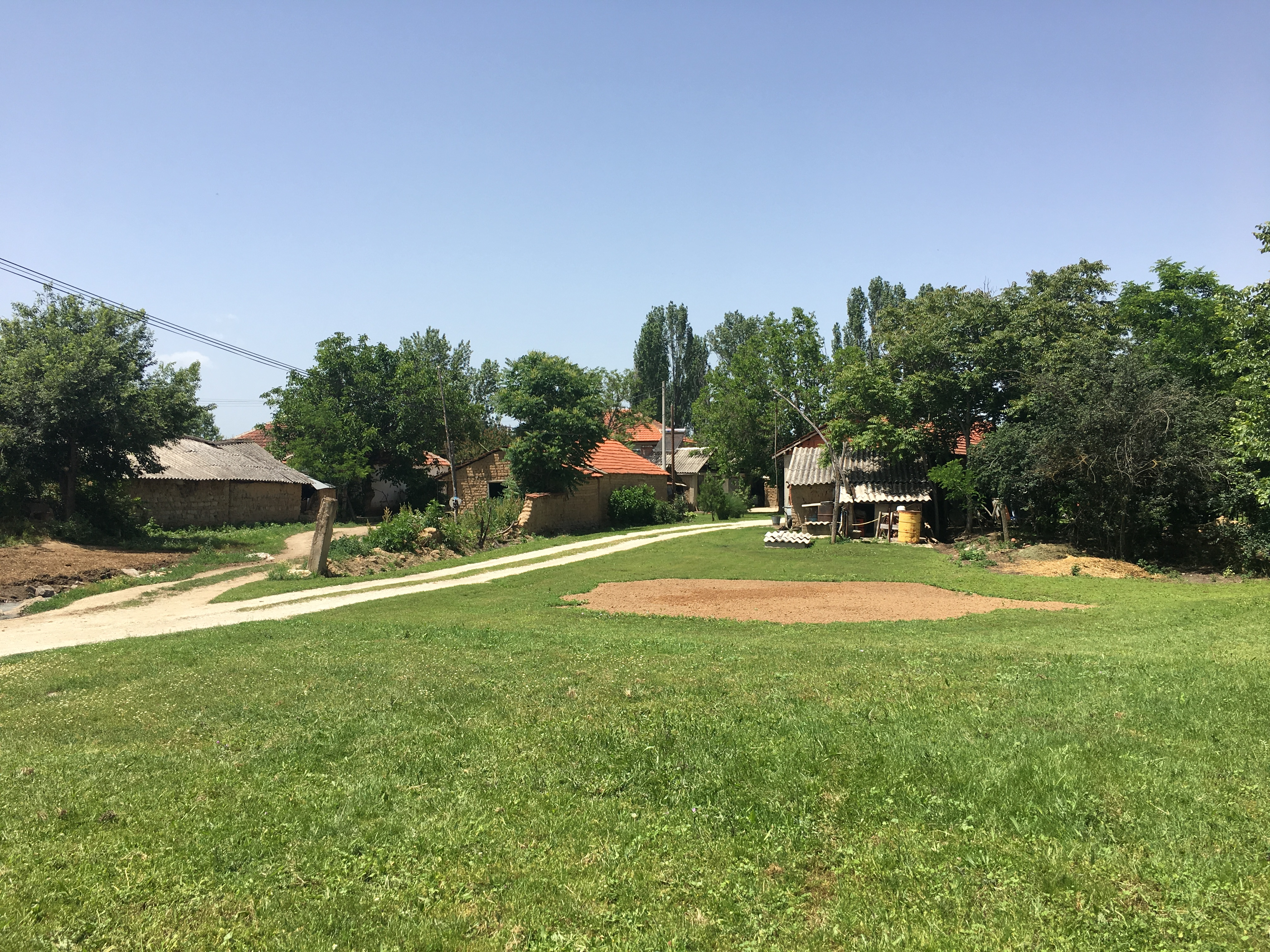
- Houses in the village

- Location within North Macedonia
- Country: North Macedonia
- Region: Pelagonia
- Municipality: Prilep
- Established: 1912
- Elevation: 572 m (1,877 ft)

Population (2021)
  - Total: 91
- Time zone: UTC+1 (CET)
- Postal code: 7512
- Area code: +389/48/4XXXXX

Klepač is a village in Municipality of Prilep, North Macedonia. It used to be part of the former municipality of Topolčani.

== Geography ==
The village is located in Pelagonia, in the extreme southern part of the Prilep Field and in the southern part of the territory of the Municipality of Prilep. The village is flat, at an altitude of 590 meters. The village is located in the southern part of the Prilep Field, 22 kilometers south of Prilep. It covers an area of 4.2 km^{2}. It is dominated by arable land on an area of 366 hectares, with the forests accounting for 17 hectares and pastures - 16 hectares.

== History ==
In the 19th century, Klepač was a village in the Prilep kaza of the Ottoman Empire.

On May 15, 1906, Velko voivode's cheta, which consisted of 9 people, was surrounded by the Ottoman army in the village and all of them were killed. A memorial plaque was placed in the village in their honor with the inscription in Bulgarian: "They died for the freedom of Macedonia and the unification of Bulgaria. The one, who falls fighting for freedom, he does not die."

== Demographics ==
According to the data of the ethnographer Vasil Kanchov from 1900, 204 inhabitants lived in Klepač, of which 196 were Bulgarians and 8 were Roma. According to the Bulgarian Exarchate Secretary Dimitar Mishev, in 1905 there were 200 inhabitants in Klepač, aligned with the Bulgarian Exarchate.

Due to the emigration of the population, Klepač changed from a medium to a small village in size. In 1961, the village had 432 inhabitants, of which 412 were Macedonians and 20 Turks, and in 1994 it had 156 Macedonians.

According to the 2002 census, the village had a total of 160 inhabitants. Ethnic groups in the village include:

- Macedonians 160
