= 1990–91 Macedonian Republic League =

Macedonian Football League seasons

Macedonian Republic League
- Season: 1990–91

The 1990–91 Macedonian Republic League was the 47th season since its establishment. FK Makedonija G.P. won their first and only championship title.

== Participating teams ==
Location of teams in 1990–91 Macedonian Republic League

Club	City
Belasica	Strumica
Bregalnica	Delchevo
FCU Skopje	Skopje
Karaorman	Struga
Kumanovo	Kumanovo
Makedonija	Skopje
Metalurg	Skopje
Napredok	Kichevo
Ohrid	Ohrid
Osogovo	Kochani
Ovche Pole	Sveti Nikole
Pobeda	Valandovo
Rabotnichki	Skopje
Rudar	Probishtip
Sasa	Makedonska Kamenica
Skopje	Skopje
Tikvesh	Kavadarci
Vardarski	Bogdanci

== Final table ==
Pos	Team	Pld	W	PKW	PKL	L	GF	GA	GD	Pts	Promotion
1	Makedonija G.P. (C)	34	23	1	1	9	70	42	+28	47	Promotion to Yugoslav Inter-Republic League East
2	Osogovo	34	20	1	5	8	66	36	+30	41	Promotion to Yugoslav Inter-Republic League East
3	Belasica	34	19	3	3	9	57	27	+30	41	Promotion to Yugoslav Inter-Republic League East
4	Tikvesh	34	16	2	1	15	52	44	+8	34	
5	Skopje	34	15	3	2	14	40	49	−9	33	
6	Metalurg	34	14	3	4	13	51	36	+15	31	
7	Napredok	34	14	3	3	14	52	41	+11	31	
8	Rabotnichki	34	13	5	3	13	43	50	−7	31	
9	Ohrid	34	14	3	2	15	45	68	−23	31	
10	Vardarski	34	13	4	1	16	35	47	−12	30	
11	FCU 55	34	13	3	7	11	64	49	+15	29	
12	Sasa	34	13	3	2	16	46	40	+6	29	
13	Ovche Pole	34	13	3	1	17	47	59	−12	29	
14	Rudar	34	12	4	0	18	53	52	+1	28	
15	Pobeda Valandovo	34	13	1	2	18	45	51	−6	27	
16	Bregalnica Delchevo	34	13	1	4	16	35	50	−15	27	
17	Kumanovo	34	12	1	3	18	55	73	−18	25	
18	Karaorman	34	11	2	0	21	33	64	−31	24	

(C) Champion
