= 1981–82 Macedonian Republic League =

Macedonian Republic League
- Season: 1981–82

The 1981–82 Macedonian Republic League was the 38th since its establishment. FK Pelister won their 4th and last championship title.

== Participating teams ==
Club	City
Belasica	Strumica
Borec	Titov Veles
Bregalnica	Shtip
Kozhuf	Gevgelija
Kumanovo	Kumanovo
Ljuboten	Tetovo
Metalurg	Skopje
Napredok	Kichevo
Osogovo	Kochani
Pobeda	Valandovo
Pelister	Bitola
Rabotnichki	Skopje
Sasa	Makedonska Kamenica
Sloga	Vinica
Vardar	Negotino
Vardarski	Bogdanci

== Final table ==
Pos	Team	Pld	W	D	L	GF	GA	GD	Pts
1	Pelister (C)	30	16	9	5	60	24	+36	41
2	Ljuboten	30	16	6	8	55	36	+19	38
3	Borec	30	16	5	9	49	42	+7	37
4	Bregalnica Shtip	30	14	4	12	36	39	−3	32
5	Napredok	30	13	6	11	38	42	−4	32
6	Belasica	30	12	7	11	44	32	+12	31
7	Vardarski	30	11	7	12	46	43	+3	29
8	Kozhuf	30	11	7	12	38	49	−11	29
9	Osogovo	30	12	5	13	31	43	−12	29
10	Rabotnichki	30	10	8	12	46	47	−1	28
11	Kumanovo	30	10	8	12	31	35	−4	28
12	Sloga Vinica	30	10	8	12	31	45	−14	28
13	Sasa	30	9	9	12	30	33	−3	27
14	Pobeda Valandovo	30	11	5	14	31	36	−5	27
15	Metalurg Skopje (R)	30	8	9	13	20	31	−11	25
16	Vardar Negotino (R)	30	6	7	17	25	45	−20	19

(C) Champions; (R) Relegated
