= 1991–92 Macedonian Republic League =

Yugoslav football league system

Macedonian Republic League
- Season: 1991–92

The 1991–92 Macedonian Republic League was the 48th and last season since its establishment. Sasa won their first and only championship title.

It was the last season of the Macedonian Republic League as part of the Yugoslav football league system. On September 8, 1991, Macedonia declared independence, and the first 7 teams joined the newly-formed Macedonian First Football League.

== Participating teams ==
Location of teams in 1991–92 Macedonian Republic League

Club	City
Bregalnica	Delchevo
FCU Skopje	Skopje
Kozhuf	Gevgelija
Karaorman	Struga
Kumanovo	Kumanovo
Metalurg	Skopje
Napredok	Kichevo
ZIK Novaci	Novaci
Ohrid	Ohrid
Ovche Pole	Sveti Nikole
Pobeda	Valandovo
Rabotnichki	Skopje
Rudar	Probishtip
Sasa	Makedonska Kamenica
Skopje	Skopje
Sloga Jugomagnat	Skopje
Tikvesh	Kavadarci
Vardarski	Bogdanci

== Final table ==
Pos	Team	Pld	W	D	L	GF	GA	GD	Pts	Qualification
1	Sasa (C)	34	–	–	–	–	–	—	45	Advanced to the Macedonian First League
2	Sloga Jugomagnat	34	–	–	–	–	–	—	41	Advanced to the Macedonian First League
3	FCU 55	34	–	–	–	–	–	—	41	Advanced to the Macedonian First League
4	Tikvesh	34	17	5	12	66	45	+21	39	Advanced to the Macedonian First League
5	Rudar	34	–	–	–	–	–	—	37	Advanced to the Macedonian First League
6	Metalurg	34	–	–	–	–	–	—	37	Advanced to the Macedonian First League
7	Vardarski	34	–	–	–	–	–	—	36	Advanced to the Macedonian First League
8	Ohrid	34	–	–	–	–	–	—	34	Advanced to the Macedonian Second League
9	Ovche Pole	34	–	–	–	–	–	—	30	Advanced to the Macedonian Second League
10	Kozhuf	34	–	–	–	–	–	—	29	Advanced to the Macedonian Second League
11	Karaorman	34	–	–	–	–	–	—	29	Advanced to the Macedonian Second League
12	Napredok	34	–	–	–	–	–	—	25	Advanced to the Macedonian Second League
13	Kumanovo	34	–	–	–	–	–	—	25	Advanced to the Macedonian Second League
14	Rabotnichki	34	–	–	–	–	–	—	25	Advanced to the Macedonian Second League
15	ZIK Novaci	34	–	–	–	–	–	—	24	Advanced to the Macedonian Second League
16	Pobeda Valandovo	34	–	–	–	–	–	—	23	Advanced to the Macedonian Second League
17	Skopje	34	–	–	–	–	–	—	20	Advanced to the Macedonian Second League
18	Bregalnica Delchevo	34	–	–	–	–	–	—	20	Advanced to the Macedonian Second League

(C) Champions
