= 1983–84 Macedonian Republic League =

Macedonian Republic League
- Season: 1983–84

The 1983–84 Macedonian Republic League was the 40th since its establishment. FK Bregalnica Shtip won their 4th championship title, after the last one 8 years before back in 1976.

== Participating teams ==
Club	City
Borec	Veles
Bregalnica	Shtip
Karaorman	Struga
Kozhuf	Gevgelija
Kumanovo	Kumanovo
Ljuboten	Tetovo
Metalurg	Skopje
Napredok	Kichevo
Ohrid	Ohrid
Pobeda Prilep	Prilep
Pobeda Valandovo	Valandovo
Rabotnichki	Skopje
REK Bitola	Novaci
Sasa	Makedonska Kamenica
Tikvesh	Kavadarci
Vardarski	Bogdanci

== Final table ==
Pos	Team	Pld	W	D	L	GF	GA	GD	Pts
1	Bregalnica Shtip (C)	30	19	8	3	55	11	+44	46
2	Pobeda Prilep	30	15	10	5	46	26	+20	40
3	Ljuboten	30	14	9	7	49	39	+10	37
4	Rabotnichki	30	12	11	7	49	30	+19	35
5	Tikvesh	30	13	7	10	46	40	+6	33
6	Sasa	30	12	8	10	45	38	+7	32
7	Kozhuf	30	11	8	11	31	30	+1	30
8	Kumanovo	30	11	8	11	43	43	0	30
9	Napredok	30	10	10	10	36	37	−1	30
10	REK Bitola	30	13	3	14	39	41	−2	29
11	Borec	30	9	9	12	36	36	0	27
12	Vardarski	30	10	7	13	35	52	−17	27
13	Metalurg Skopje	30	6	14	10	28	38	−10	26
14	Ohrid	30	9	7	14	40	54	−14	25
15	Karaorman (R)	30	4	9	17	37	67	−30	17
16	Pobeda Valandovo (R)	30	7	2	21	41	84	−43	16

Source: RSSSF.org
(C) Champions; (R) Relegated
