= 1984–85 Macedonian Republic League =

Macedonian Republic League
- Season: 1984–85

The 1984–85 Macedonian Republic League was the 41st since its establishment. Teteks won their 4th championship title.

== Participating teams ==
Club	City
Borec	Veles
Bregalnica	Delchevo
Gostivar	Gostivar
Kozhuf	Gevgelija
Kumanovo	Kumanovo
Ljuboten	Tetovo
Metalurg	Skopje
Napredok	Kichevo
Ohrid	Ohrid
Pobeda	Prilep
Rabotnichki	Skopje
REK Bitola	Novaci
Sasa	Makedonska Kamenica
Teteks	Tetovo
Tikvesh	Kavadarci
Vardarski	Bogdanci

== League table ==
Pos	Team	Pld	W	D	L	GF	GA	GD	Pts
1	Teteks (C)	30	20	9	1	68	24	+44	49
2	Pobeda Prilep	30	18	8	4	58	20	+38	44
3	Ljuboten	30	17	10	3	55	21	+34	44
4	Kozhuf	30	13	9	8	43	29	+14	35
5	Bregalnica Delchevo	30	13	9	8	44	39	+5	35
6	Sasa	30	13	8	9	47	40	+7	34
7	Rabotnichki	30	13	8	9	33	40	−7	34
8	Kumanovo	30	11	8	11	36	40	−4	30
9	Tikvesh	30	11	7	12	43	47	−4	29
10	Napredok	30	10	8	12	32	39	−7	28
11	Borec	30	9	8	13	25	29	−4	26
12	Metalurg Skopje	30	6	13	11	43	47	−4	25
13	Vardarski	30	6	13	11	43	47	−4	25
14	REK Bitola	30	7	8	15	38	50	−12	22
15	Gostivar (R)	30	3	5	22	26	90	−64	11
16	Ohrid (R)	30	3	3	24	25	79	−54	9

(C) Champions; (R) Relegated
