= 1966–67 Macedonian Republic League =

Macedonian Republic League
- Season: 1966–67

The 1966–67 Macedonian Republic League was the 24th since its establishment. Bregalnica Shtip won their 2nd championship title.

== Participating teams ==
Club	City
Belasica	Strumica
Borec	Titov Veles
Bregalnica	Shtip
Karaorman	Struga
KSK	Kumanovo
Mavrovo	Gostivar
MIK Skopje	Skopje
Ovche Pole	Sveti Nikole
Pelagonija	Bitola
Rabotnichki	Skopje
Rabotnik	Bitola
Teteks	Tetovo
Tikvesh	Kavadarci
Vardar	Negotino

== Final table ==
Pos	Team	Pld	W	D	L	GF	GA	GD	Pts
1	Bregalnica Shtip (C)	26	13	6	7	35	24	+11	32
2	Vardar Negotino	26	13	5	8	52	34	+18	31
3	MIK Skopje	26	13	4	9	56	38	+18	30
4	Tikvesh	26	13	3	10	46	36	+10	29
5	KSK Kumanovo	26	13	1	12	51	54	−3	27
6	Belasica	26	11	5	10	39	42	−3	27
7	Ohrid	26	9	7	10	39	38	+1	25
8	Teteks	26	12	1	13	48	48	0	25
9	Borec	26	12	1	13	42	45	−3	25
10	Mavrovo Gostivar	26	11	3	12	33	51	−18	25
11	Pelagonija Bitola	26	9	6	11	35	38	−3	24
12	Karaorman	26	11	2	13	50	57	−7	24
13	Ovche Pole (R)	26	9	3	14	35	47	−12	21
14	Rabotnik (R)	26	7	5	14	40	48	−8	18

(C) Champions; (R) Relegated
