= 1985–86 Macedonian Republic League =

Macedonian Republic League
- Season: 1985–86

The 1985–86 Macedonian Republic League was the 42nd since its establishment. Pobeda won their 8th championship title.

== Participating teams ==
Club	City
Balkan	Skopje
Borec	Veles
Bregalnica	Delchevo
Kozhuf	Gevgelija
Kumanovo	Kumanovo
Ljuboten	Tetovo
Metalurg	Skopje
Napredok	Kichevo
Osogovo	Kochani
Pobeda	Prilep
Rabotnichki	Skopje
REK Bitola	Novaci
Sasa	Makedonska Kamenica
Skopje	Skopje
Tikvesh	Kavadarci
Vardarski	Bogdanci

== League table ==
Pos	Team	Pld	W	D	L	GF	GA	GD	Pts
1	Pobeda Prilep (C)	30	17	7	6	52	23	+29	41
2	Sasa	30	17	7	6	56	34	+22	41
3	Vardarski	30	14	10	6	55	34	+21	38
4	Tikvesh	30	13	6	11	37	37	0	32
5	Kozhuf	30	11	9	10	30	30	0	31
6	Rabotnichki	30	11	8	11	41	36	+5	30
7	Skopje	30	11	6	13	52	42	+10	28
8	Borec	30	9	9	12	35	40	−5	27
9	Metalurg Skopje	30	8	11	11	45	51	−6	27
10	Ljuboten	30	11	5	14	43	49	−6	27
11	Osogovo	30	10	7	13	39	47	−8	27
12	Napredok	30	7	13	10	34	41	−7	27
13	Bregalnica Delchevo	30	11	5	14	41	51	−10	27
14	Balkan	30	10	7	13	39	50	−11	27
15	REK Bitola	30	9	8	13	42	46	−4	26
16	Kumanovo	30	7	10	13	29	39	−10	24

(C) Champions
