= 1979–80 Macedonian Republic League =

Macedonian Republic League
- Season: 1979–80

The 1979–80 Macedonian Republic League was the 36th since its establishment. FK Rabotnichki won their 10th and last championship title.

== Participating teams ==
Club	City
11 Oktomvri	Prilep
Belasica	Strumica
Borec	Titov Veles
Bregalnica	Shtip
Karaorman	Struga
Kozhuf	Gevgelija
Ljuboten	Tetovo
Napredok	Kichevo
Pelister	Bitola
Pobeda	Valandovo
Rabotnichki	Skopje
Sasa	Makedonska Kamenica
Sloga	Skopje
Tikvesh	Kavadarci
Vardar	Negotino
Vardarski	Bogdanci

== Final table ==
Pos	Team	Pld	W	D	L	GF	GA	GD	Pts
1	Rabotnichki (C)	30	17	12	1	83	32	+51	46
2	Bregalnica Shtip	30	14	9	7	44	23	+21	37
3	Belasica	30	15	7	8	43	23	+20	37
4	Pelister	30	14	8	8	46	29	+17	36
5	Borec	30	10	12	8	31	24	+7	32
6	Tikvesh	30	10	11	9	36	32	+4	31
7	Sasa	30	9	12	9	30	32	−2	30
8	Kozhuf	30	12	6	12	36	47	−11	30
9	Napredok	30	12	5	13	37	41	−4	29
10	Ljuboten	30	10	8	12	37	48	−11	28
11	Vardar Negotino	30	9	9	12	37	46	−9	27
12	Vardarski	30	10	7	13	42	58	−16	27
13	Pobeda Valandovo	30	10	6	14	38	41	−3	26
14	11 Oktomvri	30	8	10	12	29	37	−8	26
15	Sloga Skopje (R)	30	6	10	14	30	50	−20	22
16	Karaorman (R)	30	6	4	20	27	64	−37	16

(C) Champions; (R) Relegated
