= 1980–81 Macedonian Republic League =

Macedonian Republic League
- Season: 1980–81

The 1980–81 Macedonian Republic League was the 37th since its establishment. FK Pobeda won their 7th championship title.

== Participating teams ==
Club	City
11 Oktomvri	Prilep
Belasica	Strumica
Borec	Titov Veles
Bregalnica	Shtip
Kozhuf	Gevgelija
Ljuboten	Tetovo
Metalurg	Skopje
Napredok	Kichevo
Pelister	Bitola
Pobeda Prilep	Prilep
Pobeda Valandovo	Valandovo
Sasa	Makedonska Kamenica
Sloga	Vinica
Tikvesh	Kavadarci
Vardar	Negotino
Vardarski	Bogdanci

== Final table ==
Pos	Team	Pld	W	D	L	GF	GA	GD	Pts
1	Pobeda Prilep (C)	30	18	9	3	70	26	+44	45
2	Bregalnica Shtip	30	18	8	4	55	22	+33	44
3	Vardarski	30	13	7	10	63	47	+16	33
4	Pelister	30	12	8	10	39	40	−1	32
5	Pobeda Valandovo	30	12	7	11	43	47	−4	31
6	Sloga Vinica	30	10	10	10	41	42	−1	30
7	Borec	30	9	11	10	21	19	+2	29
8	Sasa	30	9	11	10	40	42	−2	29
9	Ljuboten	30	12	5	13	38	55	−17	29
10	Kozhuf	30	10	8	12	39	41	−2	28
11	Metalurg Skopje	30	8	12	10	49	58	−9	28
12	Belasica	30	11	5	14	40	36	+4	27
13	Vardar Negotino	30	12	3	15	44	51	−7	27
14	Napredok	30	11	5	14	36	44	−8	27
15	11 Oktomvri (R)	30	11	3	16	37	49	−12	25
16	Tikvesh (R)	30	5	6	19	18	60	−42	16

(C) Champions; (R) Relegated
