= 1978–79 Macedonian Republic League =

Macedonian Republic League
- Season: 1978–79

The 1978–79 Macedonian Republic League was the 35th since its establishment. FK Pobeda won their 6th championship title.

== Participating teams ==
Club	City
11 Oktomvri	Prilep
Belasica	Strumica
Borec	Titov Velec
Bregalnica	Shtip
Jugokokta	Skopje
Karaorman	Struga
Kozhuf	Gevgelija
Metalurg	Skopje
Osogovo	Kochani
Pelister	Bitola
Pobeda Prilep	Prilep
Pobeda Valandovo	Valandovo
Rabotnichki	Skopje
Sloga Skopje	Skopje
Sloga Vinica	Vinica
Transkop	Bitola
Vardar	Negotino
Vardarski	Bogdanci

== Final table ==
Pos	Team	Pld	W	D	L	GF	GA	GD	Pts
1	Pobeda Prilep (C)	34	21	6	7	66	33	+33	48
2	Pelister	34	18	11	5	56	17	+39	47
3	Belasica	34	20	5	9	60	36	+24	45
4	Rabotnichki	34	14	10	10	58	36	+22	38
5	Pobeda Valandovo	34	13	9	12	50	47	+3	35
6	Vardar Negotino	34	14	6	14	50	44	+6	34
7	Borec	34	13	8	13	36	34	+2	34
8	Kozhuf	34	12	10	12	45	48	−3	34
9	Bregalnica Shtip	34	9	15	10	39	39	0	33
10	Sloga Skopje	34	9	14	11	32	41	−9	32
11	Vardarski	34	13	6	15	32	43	−11	32
12	11 Oktomvri	34	11	9	14	35	46	−11	31
13	Karaorman	34	10	11	13	33	50	−17	31
14	Osogovo	34	11	7	16	34	44	−10	29
15	Sloga Vinica	34	11	7	16	43	62	−19	29
16	Metalurg Skopje	34	9	10	15	30	37	−7	28
17	Jugokokta Gjorche Petrov (R)	34	9	9	16	39	50	−11	27
18	Transkop Bitola (R)	34	9	7	18	40	64	−24	25

(C) Champions; (R) Relegated
