= 1976–77 Macedonian Republic League =

Macedonian Republic League
- Season: 1976–77

The 1976–77 Macedonian Republic League was the 33rd since its establishment. FK Rabotnichki won their 9th championship title.

== Participating teams ==
Club	City
11 Oktomvri	Prilep
Balkan	Skopje
Belasica	Strumica
FCU Skopje	Skopje
Karaorman	Struga
Kozhuf	Gevgelija
Kumanovo	Kumanovo
Ohrid	Ohrid
Osogovo	Kochani
Pelister	Bitola
Pobeda	Valandovo
Rabotnichki	Skopje
Rudar	Probishtip
Silika	Gostivar
Skopje	Skopje
Sloga	Skopje
Tikvesh	Kavadarci
Vardar	Negotino

== Final table ==
Pos	Team	Pld	W	D	L	GF	GA	GD	Pts
1	Rabotnichki (C)	34	18	9	7	62	39	+23	45
2	Pobeda Valandovo	34	14	11	9	64	46	+18	39
3	Pelister	34	16	6	12	49	31	+18	38
4	Belasica	34	13	11	10	49	38	+11	37
5	Kozhuf	34	11	14	9	33	28	+5	36
6	Vardar Negotino	34	11	13	10	42	36	+6	35
7	Tikvesh	34	13	9	12	53	48	+5	35
8	Kumanovo	34	15	4	15	40	40	0	34
9	Karaorman	34	11	11	12	39	44	−5	33
10	Osogovo	34	11	11	12	35	45	−10	33
11	Skopje	34	9	14	11	47	47	0	32
12	Sloga Skopje	34	12	8	14	35	36	−1	32
13	Ohrid	34	14	4	16	53	59	−6	32
14	Balkan	34	9	14	11	34	42	−8	32
15	11 Oktomvri	34	13	5	16	39	48	−9	31
16	Silika Gostivar	34	11	9	14	39	54	−15	31
17	Rudar Probishtip (R)	34	13	4	17	45	56	−11	30
18	FCU 55 (R)	34	8	11	15	44	61	−17	27

(C) Champions; (R) Relegated
