= 1962–63 Macedonian Republic League =

Macedonian Republic League
- Season: 1962–63

The 1962–63 Macedonian Republic League was the 20th since its establishment. Pobeda won their fifth championship title.

== Participating teams ==
Club	City
Belasica	Strumica
Bregalnica	Shtip
Karaorman	Struga
KSK	Kumanovo
Ljuboten	Tetovo
Metalec	Skopje
Napredok	Kichevo
Ohrid	Ohrid
Pelister	Bitola
Pobeda	Prilep
Rabotnichki	Skopje
Teteks	Tetovo
Tikvesh	Kavadarci
Vardar	Negotino

== Final table ==
Pos	Team	Pld	W	D	L	GF	GA	GD	Pts
1	Pobeda Prilep	26	18	1	7	91	41	+50	37
2	Tikvesh Kavadarci	26	15	0	11	52	35	+17	30
3	Vardar Negotino	26	13	3	10	56	47	+9	29
4	Napredok Kichevo	26	13	2	11	63	55	+8	28
5	Metalec Skopje	26	11	5	10	54	49	+5	27
6	Belasica Strumica	26	11	5	10	46	44	+2	27
7	Bregalnica Shtip	26	11	5	10	54	52	+2	27
8	Ohrid	26	12	3	11	47	63	−16	27
9	Teteks Tetovo	26	10	6	10	51	52	−1	26
10	KSK Kumanovo	26	10	5	11	44	55	−11	25
11	Rabotnichki Skopje	26	10	3	13	47	47	0	23
12	Karaorman Struga	26	11	1	14	59	61	−2	23
13	Ljuboten Tetovo	26	8	5	13	37	64	−27	21
14	Pelister Bitola	26	6	2	18	44	81	−37	14

Source: "Godišnjak FSJ 1962-63", Beograd, 1963., ISSN: 0351-2894, page 256
