= 1968–69 Macedonian Republic League =

Macedonian Republic League
- Season: 1968–69

The 1968–69 Macedonian Republic League was the 25th since its establishment. Teteks Tetovo won their 2nd championship title.

== Participating teams ==
Club	City
Balkan	Skopje
Belasica	Strumica
Borec	Titov Veles
BSK	Bitola
FCU Skopje	Skopje
Karaorman	Struga
Kozhuf	Gevgelija
KSK	Kumanovo
Ljuboten	Tetovo
Mavrovo	Gostivar
MIK Skopje	Skopje
Ohrid	Ohrid
Osogovo	Kochani
Pitu Guli	Kruševo
Teteks	Tetovo
Vardar	Negotino

== Final table ==
Pos	Team	Pld	W	D	L	GF	GA	GD	Pts
1	Teteks (C)	30	18	4	8	63	32	+31	40
2	MIK Skopje	30	16	7	7	50	29	+21	39
3	Mavrovo Gostivar	30	18	1	11	64	40	+24	37
4	FCU Skopje	30	13	7	10	53	43	+10	34 (Note: 1 bonus point?)
5	Osogovo	30	13	7	10	43	38	+5	33
6	Vardar Negotino	30	13	5	12	42	42	0	31
7	Belasica	30	13	4	13	60	48	+12	30
8	Karaorman	30	13	3	14	45	50	−5	29
9	Kozhuf	30	13	3	14	51	64	−13	29
10	Ohrid	30	12	5	13	49	62	−13	29
11	Balkan	30	12	4	14	50	49	+1	28
12	BSK	30	11	6	13	40	43	−3	28
13	Ljuboten	30	10	6	14	44	60	−16	26
14	KSK Kumanovo	30	11	3	16	47	63	−16	25
15	Pitu Guli (R)	30	10	4	16	45	65	−20	24
16	Borec (R)	30	7	4	19	38	60	−22	18 (Note: Errors in the table: 203 total wins != 204 total losses, 73 total draws is an odd number, and 784 total for != 788 total against.)

(C) Champions; (R) Relegated
