= 1975–76 Macedonian Republic League =

Macedonian Republic League
- Season: 1975–76

The 1975–76 Macedonian Republic League was the 32nd since its establishment. FK Bregalnica Shtip won their 3rd championship title.

== Participating teams ==
Club	City
11 Oktomvri	Prilep
Balkan	Skopje
Belasica	Strumica
Bregalnica	Shtip
FAS 11 Oktomvri	Skopje
FCU Skopje	Skopje
Jugokokta	Skopje
Karaorman	Struga
Kozhuf	Gevgelija
Kumanovo	Kumanovo
Ohrid	Ohrid
Osogovo	Kochani
Ovche Pole	Sveti Nikole
Rudar	Probishtip
Silika	Gostivar
Skopje	Skopje
Tikvesh	Kavadarci
Tiverija	Strumica

== Final table ==
Pos	Team	Pld	W	D	L	GF	GA	GD	Pts
1	Bregalnica Shtip (C)	34	21	9	4	71	29	+42	51
2	Kumanovo	34	20	9	5	59	18	+41	49
3	Tikvesh	34	17	8	9	55	44	+11	42
4	Silika Gostivar	34	13	13	8	43	51	−8	39
5	Skopje	34	12	12	10	68	54	+14	36
6	FCU 55	34	15	6	13	62	57	+5	36
7	Ohrid	34	14	8	12	50	46	+4	36
8	Kozhuf	34	11	12	11	48	46	+2	34
9	Karaorman	34	14	6	14	39	57	−18	34
10	Belasica	34	13	7	14	57	53	+4	33
11	Osogovo	34	13	7	14	35	37	−2	33
12	Rudar Probishtip	34	13	7	14	51	54	−3	33
13	11 Oktomvri	34	12	9	13	37	42	−5	33
14	Balkan	34	9	14	11	44	43	+1	32
15	FAS 11 Oktomvri Skopje	34	10	11	13	42	43	−1	31
16	Jugokokta Gjorche Petrov	34	11	8	15	51	54	−3	30
17	Tiverija (R)	34	6	9	19	31	66	−35	17 (Note: 4 points deducted.)
18	Ovche Pole (R)	34	3	5	26	26	75	−49	11 (Note: The total number of wins in the table is 227, while the total number of losses is 225, which indicates there is an error in the table.)

(C) Champions; (R) Relegated
