= 1972–73 Macedonian Republic League =

Football league season

Macedonian Republic League
- Season: 1972–73

The 1972–73 Macedonian Republic League was the 29th since its establishment. FK Rabotnichki won their 8th championship title.

== Participating teams ==
Club	City
11 Oktomvri	Prilep
Balkan	Skopje
Belasica	Strumica
Borec	Titov Veles
FAS 11 Oktomvri	Skopje
FCU Skopje	Skopje
Jugokokta	Skopje
Karaorman	Struga
Ljuboten	Tetovo
Mavrovo	Gostivar
Osogovo	Kochani
Ovche Pole	Sveti Nikole
Pelister	Bitola
Rabotnichki	Skopje
Rudar	Probishtip
Skopje	Skopje
Sloga	Skopje
Vardar	Negotino

== Final table ==
Pos	Team	Pld	W	D	L	GF	GA	GD	Pts
1	Rabotnichki (C)	34	18	12	4	67	33	+34	48
2	Balkan	34	15	10	9	49	38	+11	40
3	11 Oktomvri	34	15	9	10	45	53	−8	39
4	Ljuboten	34	12	11	11	48	49	−1	35
5	Sloga Skopje	34	12	10	12	49	37	+12	34
6	Vardar Negotino	34	13	8	13	48	42	+6	34
7	Jugokokta Gjorche Petrov	34	13	8	13	51	47	+4	34
8	Belasica	34	14	6	14	48	52	−4	34
9	FCU 55	34	13	8	13	41	51	−10	34
10	Borec	34	12	10	12	43	54	−11	34
11	Skopje	34	13	7	14	61	46	+15	33
12	Rudar Probishtip	34	13	7	14	54	47	+7	33
13	Mavrovo Gostivar	34	11	10	13	35	34	+1	33 (Note: 1 bonus point awarded?)
14	FAS 11 Oktomvri Skopje	33	13	7	13	51	52	−1	33 (Note: There are clearly errors in the table since the total number of wins, 226, is less than the total number of losses, 227, and there are an odd number of draws. In addition, the total number of goals for is 856, while the total number of goals against is 861.)
15	Osogovo	33	11	10	12	39	49	−10	32
16	Karaorman	34	11	9	14	49	54	−5	31
17	Pelister (R)	34	11	7	16	49	46	+3	29
18	Ovche Pole (R)	34	6	8	20	29	77	−48	20

(C) Champions; (R) Relegated
