= 1970–71 Macedonian Republic League =

Macedonian Republic League
- Season: 1970–71

The 1970–71 Macedonian Republic League was the 27th since its establishment. FK Kumanovo won their 2nd championship title.

== Participating teams ==
Club	City
11 Oktomvri	Prilep
Balkan	Skopje
Belasica	Strumica
Borec	Titov Veles
FCU Skopje	Skopje
Jugokokta	Skopje
Karaorman	Struga
Kozhuf	Gevgelija
Kumanovo	Kumanovo
Mavrovo	Gostivar
Osogovo	Kochani
Ovche Pole	Sveti Nikole
Pelister	Bitola
Sloga	Skopje
Tikvesh	Kavadarci
Vardar	Negotino

== Final table ==
Pos	Team	Pld	W	D	L	GF	GA	GD	Pts
1	Kumanovo (C)	30	15	12	3	53	23	+30	42
2	Pelister	30	14	10	6	43	21	+22	38
3	Sloga Skopje	30	13	9	8	50	36	+14	35
4	FCU Skopje	30	8	14	8	44	36	+8	30
5	Ovche Pole	30	10	10	10	43	37	+6	30
6	Mavrovo Gostivar	30	9	12	9	23	32	−9	30
7	Tikvesh	30	11	7	12	42	40	+2	29
8	Balkan	30	8	12	10	55	52	+3	28
9	Borec	30	10	8	12	33	37	−4	28
10	Osogovo	30	11	6	13	30	44	−14	28
11	Jugokokta Gjorche Petrov	30	10	8	12	40	55	−15	28
12	11 Oktomvri	30	12	4	14	45	61	−16	28
13	Belasica	30	11	5	14	38	42	−4	27
14	Karaorman	30	12	3	15	48	53	−5	27
15	Kozhuf (R)	30	10	7	13	29	39	−10	27
16	Vardar Negotino (R)	30	9	7	14	49	57	−8	25

(C) Champions; (R) Relegated
