= 1965–66 Macedonian Republic League =

Macedonian Republic League
- Season: 1965–66

The 1965–66 Macedonian Republic League was the 23rd since its establishment. Rabotnichki Skopje won their 6th championship title.

== Participating teams ==
Club	City
Belasica	Strumica
Borec	Titov Veles
Bregalnica	Shtip
Karaorman	Struga
Ljuboten	Tetovo
Mavrovo	Gostivar
MIK Skopje	Skopje
Napredok	Kichevo
Pelagonija	Bitola
Rabotnichki	Skopje
Rabotnik	Bitola
Teteks	Tetovo
Tikvesh	Kavadarci
Vardar	Negotino

== Final table ==
Pos	Team	Pld	W	D	L	GF	GA	GD	Pts
1	Rabotnichki (C)	26	16	4	6	56	29	+27	36
2	Tikvesh	26	14	4	8	40	24	+16	32
3	MIK Skopje	26	14	4	8	51	39	+12	32
4	Bregalnica Shtip	26	13	3	10	50	34	+16	29
5	Karaorman	26	13	3	10	47	35	+12	29
6	Vardar Negotino	26	10	7	9	44	31	+13	27
7	Teteks	26	11	3	12	44	47	−3	25
8	Borec	26	10	5	11	33	43	−10	25
9	Rabotnik	26	9	6	11	35	29	+6	24
10	Pelagonija Bitola	26	9	6	11	35	31	+4	24
11	Mavrovo Gostivar	26	9	5	12	30	50	−20	23
12	Belasica	26	10	2	14	32	36	−4	22
13	Ljuboten (R)	26	9	4	13	46	59	−13	22
14	Napredok (R)	26	6	2	18	26	67	−41	14

(C) Champions; (R) Relegated
