= 1960–61 Macedonian Republic League =

Macedonian Republic League
- Season: 1960–61

The 1960–61 Macedonian Republic League was the 18th since its establishment. Pelister won their fourth championship title.

== Participating teams ==
Club	City
11 Oktomvri	Skopje
Bregalnica	Shtip
Karaorman	Struga
Ljuboten	Tetovo
Metalec	Skopje
Ohrid	Ohrid
Pelister	Bitola
Rabotnichki (S)	Skopje
Rabotnichki (V)	Veles
Rabotnik	Bitola
Sloga	Skopje
Tikvesh	Kavadarci

== Final table ==
Pos	Team	Pld	W	D	L	GF	GA	GD	Pts
1	Pelister Bitola	22	11	7	4	50	21	+29	29
2	Metalec Skopje	22	13	3	6	53	39	+14	29
3	Rabotnichki Skopje	22	11	6	5	46	29	+17	28
4	Karaorman Struga	22	10	5	7	49	40	+9	25
5	Tikvesh Kavadarci	22	10	4	8	42	42	0	24
6	Bregalnica Shtip	22	10	3	9	39	43	−4	23
7	11 Oktomvri Skopje	22	8	6	8	34	34	0	22
8	Belasica Strumica	22	8	4	10	40	40	0	20
9	KSK Kumanovo	22	6	7	9	48	43	+5	19
10	Rabotnik Bitola	22	6	6	10	54	42	+12	18
11	Rabotnichki Veles	22	8	1	13	24	46	−22	17
12	Sloga Skopje	22	3	4	15	19	53	−34	10

Source: Godišnjak Fudbalskog saveza Jugoslavije 1960-61, Beograd, 1961., ISSN: 0351-2894
