= 1992–93 Macedonian First Football League =

Macedonian First League
- Season: 1992–93
- Dates: 23 August 1992 – 13 June 1993
- Champions: Vardar; 1st Macedonian title 2nd domestic title
- Relegated: Metalurg; Bregalnica; Teteks; Vardarski
- Matches: 306
- Goals: 824 (2.69 per match)
- Top goalscorer: Saša Ćirić (36 goals)
- Biggest home win: Vardar 11–0 Vardarski (30 May 1993)
- Biggest away win: Vardarski 1–7 Vardar (8 November 1992)
- Highest scoring: Vardar 11–0 Vardarski (30 May 1993)

The 1992–93 Macedonian First League was the first season of the Macedonian First Football League, the highest football league of Macedonia. It was the initial season, after Republic of Macedonia's independence from Yugoslavia. The first matches of the season were played on 23 August 1992 and the last on 13 June 1993. Vardar won the first championship title without loss.

== Participating teams ==
The two teams (Pelister and Vardar) was qualified from the Yugoslav First League, another two teams (Balkan and Teteks) was qualified from the Yugoslav Second League, the seven teams (Belasica, Borec, Bregalnica, Makedonija G.P., Osogovo, Pobeda and Sileks) was qualified from the Yugoslav Inter-Republic League East and the rest of the teams (FCU 55, Metalurg, Rudar, Sasa, Sloga Jugomagnat, Tikvesh and Vardarski) was qualified from the Macedonian Republic League.

Location of teams in 1992–93 Macedonian First League

| Club | City | Stadium |
|---|---|---|
| Balkan Stokokomerc | Skopje | Chair Stadium |
| Belasica | Strumica | Stadion Mladost |
| Bregalnica | Shtip | Gradski stadion Shtip |
| Borec | Titov Veles | Gradski stadion Titov Veles |
| FCU Skopje | Skopje | Stadion Cementarnica |
| Makedonija | Skopje | Stadion Gjorche Petrov |
| Metalurg | Skopje | Stadion Zhelezarnica |
| Osogovo | Kochani | Stadion Nikola Mantov |
| Pelister | Bitola | Stadion Tumbe Kafe |
| Pobeda Vitaminka | Prilep | Stadion Goce Delchev |
| Rudar | Probishtip | Gradski stadion Probishtip |
| Sasa | Makedonska Kamenica | Gradski stadion Makedonska Kamenica |
| Sileks | Kratovo | Stadion Sileks |
| Sloga Jugomagnat | Skopje | Chair Stadium |
| Teteks | Tetovo | Gradski stadion Tetovo |
| Tikvesh | Kavadarci | Gradski stadion Kavadarci |
| Vardar | Skopje | Gradski stadion Skopje |
| Vardarski | Bogdanci | Gradski stadion Bogdanci |

== League table ==
| Pos | Team | Pld | W | D | L | GF | GA | GD | Pts | Qualification or relegation |
|---|---|---|---|---|---|---|---|---|---|---|
| 1 | Vardar (C) | 34 | 27 | 7 | 0 | 119 | 16 | +103 | 61 | Champions |
| 2 | Sileks | 34 | 17 | 6 | 11 | 72 | 50 | +22 | 40 | |
| 3 | Balkan | 34 | 15 | 10 | 9 | 36 | 21 | +15 | 40 | |
| 4 | Pelister | 34 | 14 | 8 | 12 | 47 | 36 | +11 | 36 | |
| 5 | Sasa | 34 | 14 | 8 | 12 | 41 | 44 | −3 | 36 | |
| 6 | Sloga Jugomagnat | 34 | 13 | 8 | 13 | 46 | 37 | +9 | 34 | |
| 7 | Tikvesh | 34 | 12 | 10 | 12 | 52 | 50 | +2 | 34 | |
| 8 | Osogovo | 34 | 13 | 8 | 13 | 39 | 41 | −2 | 34 | |
| 9 | Rudar Probishtip | 34 | 15 | 4 | 15 | 44 | 47 | −3 | 34 | |
| 10 | Belasica | 34 | 12 | 10 | 12 | 41 | 44 | −3 | 34 | |
| 11 | Pobeda | 34 | 14 | 5 | 15 | 51 | 48 | +3 | 33 | |
| 12 | Borec | 34 | 12 | 8 | 14 | 42 | 43 | −1 | 32 | |
| 13 | FCU 55 | 34 | 13 | 6 | 15 | 37 | 53 | −16 | 32 | |
| 14 | Makedonija | 34 | 10 | 12 | 12 | 31 | 51 | −20 | 32 | |
| 15 | Metalurg (R) | 34 | 12 | 7 | 15 | 37 | 42 | −5 | 31 | Relegation to the Macedonian Second League |
| 16 | Bregalnica Shtip (R) | 34 | 11 | 8 | 15 | 38 | 45 | −7 | 30 | Relegation to the Macedonian Second League |
| 17 | Teteks (R) | 34 | 12 | 6 | 16 | 35 | 56 | −21 | 30 | Relegation to the Macedonian Second League |
| 18 | Vardarski (R) | 34 | 2 | 5 | 27 | 16 | 100 | −84 | 9 | Relegation to the Macedonian Second League |

Source: MacedonianFootball.com, RSSSF.org
Rules for classification: 1) Points; 2) Goal difference; 3) Goals scored; 4) Head-to-head points; 5) Head-to-head goal difference; 6) Head-to-head away goals scored (only if two teams); 7) Head-to-head goals scored; 8) Draw; 9) Play-off. (Note: Criteria 2, 3 and 8 is only used if not deciding Champion or relegation).
(C) Champions; (R) Relegated

== Results ==
| Home \ Away | BAL | BEL | BOR | BRE | FCU | MGP | MET | OSO | PEL | POB | RUD | SAS | SIL | SLO | TET | TIK | VAR | VRD |
|---|---|---|---|---|---|---|---|---|---|---|---|---|---|---|---|---|---|---|
| Balkan | — | 0–0 | 3–0 | 2–1 | 3–0 | 3–0 | 3–0 | 1–1 | 1–0 | 3–1 | 0–2 | 0–1 | 0–0 | 1–0 | 1–0 | 1–0 | 1–3 | 2–0 |
| Belasica | 0–0 | — | 2–1 | 5–2 | 4–2 | 3–0 | 0–0 | 2–1 | 2–0 | 1–0 | 0–0 | 1–0 | 1–1 | 2–1 | 0–2 | 2–0 | 1–1 | 2–1 |
| Borec | 0–2 | 2–1 | — | 1–1 | 1–0 | 3–0 | 1–1 | 0–0 | 1–0 | 4–0 | 1–0 | 4–0 | 2–0 | 2–0 | 1–1 | 2–2 | 0–1 | 6–0 |
| Bregalnica Shtip | 0–0 | 2–0 | 1–1 | — | 0–1 | 2–0 | 0–3 (Note: The match was abandoned in the 26th minute with a score of 0–1 when a home player punched the linesman. Later, the match was awarded to Metalurg.) | 2–0 | 3–1 | 2–1 | 1–0 | 2–0 | 0–1 | 3–1 | 2–2 | 1–1 | 0–0 | 4–0 |
| FCU 55 | 1–0 | 2–0 | 0–0 | 2–1 | — | 3–0 | 3–1 | 4–3 | 0–2 | 1–0 | 1–2 | 0–0 | 2–2 | 1–1 | 1–0 | 2–0 | 0–1 | 2–0 |
| Makedonija | 0–0 | 0–0 | 2–1 | 2–1 | 2–0 | — | 1–1 | 0–0 | 1–1 | 1–0 | 1–0 | 0–2 | 3–2 | 2–0 | 1–1 | 1–1 | 0–4 | 2–2 |
| Metalurg | 0–0 | 0–0 | 2–0 | 0–1 | 0–1 | 1–0 | — | 0–1 | 3–1 | 2–0 | 1–0 | 3–1 | 2–0 | 1–1 | 2–1 | 1–0 | 0–3 | 3–0 |
| Osogovo | 0–0 | 1–0 | 4–0 | 3–0 (Note: The match was abandoned in the 83rd minute with a score of 1–2 when the Bregalnica players attacked the referee for awarding a penalty kick to the hosts for a handball. Later, the match was awarded to Osogovo.) | 1–0 | 0–1 | 2–3 | — | 1–0 | 3–1 | 2–2 | 3–1 | 0–0 | 1–0 | 3–0 | 1–0 | 0–2 | 5–0 |
| Pelister | 1–0 | 1–1 | 1–0 | 2–1 | 1–2 | 1–1 | 3–0 (Note: The match was abandoned in the 89th minute with a score of 1–0 when the assistant coach of Metalurg attacked the linesmen after Pelister was scored. Later, the match was awarded to Pelister.) | 1–0 | — | 2–0 | 5–0 | 3–0 | 2–2 | 1–1 | 2–0 | 3–1 | 0–3 (Note: The match between Pelister and Vardar was awarded to Vardar after being abandoned before the kick-off due to the crowd trouble when Čkembari burned seats, collapsed the protective fence and clashed with the police.) | 3–0 |
| Pobeda | 3–1 | 3–1 | 2–0 | 3–0 | 1–1 | 5–2 | 2–1 | 6–1 | 0–2 | — | 0–1 | 1–0 | 3–2 | 4–2 | 4–1 | 1–0 | 1–1 | 2–0 |
| Rudar Probishtip | 1–0 | 3–2 | 0–1 | 1–1 | 5–1 | 4–1 | 2–1 | 1–0 | 1–3 | 1–1 | — | 1–5 | 2–1 | 1–0 | 3–1 | 3–2 | 0–4 | 1–0 |
| Sasa | 0–0 | 1–0 | 1–1 | 0–0 | 2–1 | 2–2 | 2–1 | 3–0 | 1–1 | 1–0 | 2–0 | — | 2–1 | 1–0 | 3–0 | 0–0 | 2–5 | 4–1 |
| Sileks | 2–1 | 5–2 | 1–0 | 2–1 | 9–1 | 2–1 | 4–3 | 1–0 | 2–1 | 4–3 | 2–1 | 3–1 | — | 1–1 | 2–0 | 4–1 | 1–3 | 9–0 |
| Sloga Jugomagnat | 1–2 | 3–2 | 2–1 | 3–0 | 1–0 | 0–0 | 1–0 | 0–1 | 2–1 | 1–0 | 2–0 | 3–1 | 2–1 | — | 4–0 | 4–2 | 1–1 | 6–0 |
| Teteks | 0–1 | 2–2 | 2–3 | 1–0 | 2–1 | 1–1 | 2–0 | 1–0 | 2–1 | 1–1 | 1–0 | 1–0 | 3–2 | 1–0 | — | 0–1 | 1–4 | 1–0 |
| Tikvesh | 1–0 | 4–1 | 3–1 | 2–1 | 2–0 | 1–2 | 1–1 | 1–1 | 3–0 | 1–1 | 1–0 | 1–1 | 3–0 | 2–2 | 3–1 | — | 1–1 | 6–3 |
| Vardar | 1–1 | 3–0 | 6–0 | 3–0 | 5–0 | 4–0 | 4–0 | 8–0 | 1–1 | 4–0 | 3–1 | 5–0 | 2–0 | 1–0 | 7–1 | 7–2 | — | 11–0 |
| Vardarski | 1–3 | 0–1 | 2–1 | 1–2 | 1–1 | 0–1 | 1–0 | 0–0 | 0–0 | 0–1 | 0–5 | 0–1 | 1–3 | 0–0 | 0–2 | 1–3 | 1–7 | — |

Source: MacedonianFootball.com
Legend: Blue = home team win; Yellow = draw; Red = away team win.

== Top goalscorers ==
| Rank | Player | Club | Goals |
|---|---|---|---|
| 1 | (North Macedonia) Saša Ćirić | Vardar | 36 |
| 2 | (North Macedonia) Zoran Boshkovski | Sileks | 29 |

== See also ==
- 1992–93 Macedonian Football Cup
- 1992–93 Macedonian Second Football League
