= 1945–46 Macedonian Republic League =

Macedonian Republic League
- Season: 1945–46

The 1945–46 Macedonian Republic League was the second since its establishment. Pobeda Skopje (a one of two forerunners of FK Vardar) won their first championship title.

== Participating teams ==
| Club | City |
|---|---|
| FD Rabotnički | Skopje |
| OFD Makedonija | Skopje |
| FD Pelister | Bitola |
| FD Kumanovo | Kumanovo |
| ZFD Pobeda | Skopje |
| FD Goce Delčev | Prilep |

== Final table ==
| Pos | Team | Pld | W | D | L | GF | GA | GD | Pts |
|---|---|---|---|---|---|---|---|---|---|
| 1 | ZFD Pobeda, Skopje | 10 | 8 | 1 | 1 | 34 | 8 | +26 | 17 |
| 2 | OFD Makedonija, Skopje | 10 | 8 | 0 | 2 | 33 | 10 | +23 | 16 |
| 3 | FD Pelister, Bitola | 10 | 3 | 2 | 5 | 11 | 11 | 0 | 8 |
| 4 | FD Rabotnički, Skopje | 10 | 3 | 1 | 6 | 18 | 19 | −1 | 7 |
| 5 | FD Kumanovo | 10 | 3 | 0 | 7 | 12 | 22 | −10 | 6 |
| 6 | FD Goce Delčev, Prilep | 10 | 2 | 2 | 6 | 11 | 29 | −18 | 6 |
