= 1950–51 Macedonian Republic League =

Macedonian Republic League
- Season: 1950–51

The 1950–51 Macedonian Republic League was the seventh since its establishment. Rabotnik Bitola won their second championship title.

== Participating teams ==
Club	City
Borec	Kumanovo
Bregalnica	Shtip
Crvena Dzvezda	Veles
Kozhuf	Gevgelija
Ohrid	Ohrid
11 Oktomvri	Kumanovo
Pitu Guli	Krushevo
Pobeda	Prilep
Rabotnik	Bitola
Sloga	Skopje
SSK Skopje	Skopje
Tikvesh	Kavadarci

== Final table ==
Pos	Team	Pld	W	D	L	GF	GA	GD	Pts
1	Rabotnik Bitola	22	14	4	4	42	21	+21	32
2	Sloga Skopje	22	11	6	5	33	21	+12	28
3	Pobeda Prilep	22	10	8	4	40	29	+11	28
4	Kozhuf Gevgelija	22	11	3	8	49	41	+8	25
5	Tikvesh Kavadarci	22	8	7	7	33	31	+2	23
6	Ohrid	22	7	8	7	33	29	+4	22
7	Crvena zvezda Veles	22	10	2	10	45	37	+8	22
8	Pitu Guli Krushevo	22	9	4	9	36	38	−2	22
9	Bregalnica Shtip	22	7	5	10	32	33	−1	19
10	Borec Kumanovo	22	7	3	12	31	47	−16	17
11	11 Oktomvri Kumanovo	22	5	6	11	28	40	−12	16
12	SSK Skopje	22	3	4	15	24	44	−20	10
