= 1961–62 Macedonian Republic League =

Macedonian Republic League
- Season: 1961–62

The 1961–62 Macedonian Republic League was the 19th since its establishment. Pobeda won their fourth championship title.

== Participating teams ==
Club	City
11 Oktomvri	Skopje
Bregalnica	Shtip
Karaorman	Struga
Ljuboten	Tetovo
Metalec	Skopje
Ohrid	Ohrid
Osogovo	Kočani
Pelister	Bitola
Pobeda	Prilep
Rabotnichki	Skopje
Tikvesh	Kavadarci
Vardar	Negotino

== Final table ==
Pos	Team	Pld	W	D	L	GF	GA	GD	Pts
1	Pobeda Prilep	22	14	4	4	70	26	+44	32
2	Metalec Skopje	22	12	4	6	55	35	+20	28
3	Bregalnica Shtip	22	10	4	8	37	35	+2	24
4	Pelister Bitola	22	10	3	9	41	44	−3	23
5	Rabotnichki Skopje	22	8	6	8	31	30	+1	22
6	Tikvesh Kavadarci	22	8	5	9	33	37	−4	21
7	Karaorman Struga (Note: Deducted 3 points?)	22	8	8	6	37	44	−7	21
8	Ljuboten Tetovo	22	9	3	10	33	41	−8	21
9	Vardar Negotino	22	7	6	9	52	49	+3	20
10	Ohrid	22	7	6	9	39	43	−4	20
11	11 Oktomvri Skopje	22	6	5	11	38	63	−25	17
12	Osogovo Kochani	22	6	3	13	23	42	−19	15

Source: Godišnjak FSJ 1961-62, Beograd, 1962., ISSN: 0351-2894, page 204
