= 1949–50 Macedonian Republic League =

Macedonian Republic League
- Season: 1949–50

The 1949–50 Macedonian Republic League was the sixth since its establishment. Rabotnik Bitola won their first championship title.

== Participating teams ==
| Club | City |
|---|---|
| Bregalnica | Shtip |
| Crvena Dzvezda | Veles |
| Kozhuf | Gevgelija |
| Ohrid | Ohrid |
| Pitu Guli | Krushevo |
| Pobeda | Prilep |
| Rabotnik | Bitola |
| Shar | Tetovo |
| Sloga | Skopje |
| Student | Skopje |
| Tekstilec | Skopje |
| Tikvesh | Kavadarci |

== Final table ==
| Pos | Team | Pld | W | D | L | GF | GA | GD | Pts |
|---|---|---|---|---|---|---|---|---|---|
| 1 | Rabotnik Bitola | 22 | 17 | 4 | 1 | 64 | 16 | +48 | 38 |
| 2 | Pobeda Prilep | 22 | 17 | 1 | 4 | 67 | 23 | +44 | 35 |
| 3 | Tikvesh Kavadarci | 22 | 10 | 4 | 8 | 48 | 31 | +17 | 24 |
| 4 | Sloga Skopje | 22 | 9 | 5 | 8 | 38 | 28 | +10 | 23 |
| 5 | Bregalnica Shtip | 22 | 10 | 3 | 9 | 41 | 42 | −1 | 23 |
| 6 | Crvena Dzvezda Veles | 22 | 10 | 2 | 10 | 37 | 43 | −6 | 22 |
| 7 | Ohrid | 22 | 9 | 3 | 10 | 35 | 44 | −9 | 21 |
| 8 | Kozhuf Gevgelija | 22 | 9 | 2 | 11 | 42 | 48 | −6 | 20 |
| 9 | Pitu Guli Krushevo | 22 | 8 | 2 | 12 | 35 | 49 | −14 | 18 |
| 10 | Student Skopje | 22 | 6 | 4 | 12 | 35 | 49 | −14 | 16 |
| 11 | Tekstilec Skopje | 22 | 6 | 3 | 13 | 29 | 55 | −26 | 15 |
| 12 | Shar Tetovo | 22 | 3 | 3 | 16 | 21 | 60 | −39 | 9 |
