= 1953–54 Macedonian Republic League =

Macedonian Republic League
- Season: 1953–54

The 1953–54 Macedonian Republic League was the tenth since its establishment. Pobeda Prilep won their second championship title.

== Participating teams ==
| Club | City |
|---|---|
| Belasica | Strumica |
| Bregalnica | Shtip |
| Crvena Dzvezda | Veles |
| Karaorman | Struga |
| Metalec | Skopje |
| Napredok | Kumanovo |
| Ohrid | Ohrid |
| Rabotnik | Bitola |
| Pobeda | Prilep |
| Sloga | Skopje |
| Tekstilec | Skopje |
| Tikvesh | Kavadarci |

== Final table ==
| Pos | Team | Pld | W | D | L | GF | GA | GD | Pts |
|---|---|---|---|---|---|---|---|---|---|
| 1 | Pobeda Prilep | 22 | 16 | 2 | 4 | 53 | 20 | +33 | 34 |
| 2 | Tikvesh Kavadarci | 22 | 13 | 4 | 5 | 43 | 28 | +15 | 30 |
| 3 | Metalec Skopje | 22 | 12 | 1 | 9 | 44 | 38 | +6 | 25 |
| 4 | Belasica Strumica | 22 | 10 | 2 | 10 | 44 | 38 | +6 | 22 |
| 5 | Karaorman Struga | 22 | 8 | 5 | 9 | 48 | 42 | +6 | 21 |
| 6 | Bregalnica Shtip | 22 | 8 | 5 | 9 | 52 | 54 | −2 | 21 |
| 7 | Crvena Dzvezda | 22 | 7 | 6 | 9 | 38 | 39 | −1 | 20 |
| 8 | Rabotnik Bitola | 22 | 6 | 8 | 8 | 38 | 43 | −5 | 20 |
| 9 | Sloga Skopje | 22 | 7 | 6 | 9 | 34 | 46 | −12 | 20 |
| 10 | Ohrid | 22 | 7 | 4 | 11 | 30 | 45 | −15 | 18 |
| 11 | Tekstilec Skopje | 22 | 7 | 2 | 13 | 29 | 45 | −16 | 16 |
| 12 | Napredok Kumanovo | 22 | 5 | 5 | 12 | 30 | 48 | −18 | 15 (Note: Errors in table: 106 total wins != 108 total losses and 483 total for != 486 total against.) |
