= Ilija Najdoski =

Macedonian footballer (born 1964)

Personal information
- Date of birth: 26 March 1964 (age 62)
- Place of birth: Kruševo, SR Macedonia, SFR Yugoslavia
- Height: 1.83 m (6 ft 0 in)
- Position: Centre-back

Youth career
- Pitu Guli

Senior career*
Years	Team	Apps	(Gls)
1981–1982	Pobeda	17	(0)
1984–1988	Vardar	101	(0)
1988–1992	Red Star Belgrade	114	(7)
1992–1994	Real Valladolid	54	(2)
1994–1995	Denizlispor	28	(0)
1995–1996	CSKA Sofia	10	(0)
1996–1997	FC Sion	4	(0)
Total		328	(9)

International career
1990–1992	Yugoslavia	11	(1)
1993–1996	Macedonia	10	(0)
- * Club domestic league appearances and goals

Ilija Najdoski (Macedonian: Илија Најдоски; born 26 March 1964) is a Macedonian former professional footballer who played as a centre-back for Red Star Belgrade. He was part of the Red Star Belgrade team which won the 1990–91 European Cup.

== Club career ==
He started his football career at the FK Pitu Guli club in Kruševo and taught at FK Pobeda in Prilep, for which he played from 1979 to 1983. He got his affirmation in 1984 when he moved to FK Vardar in Skopje.At Vardar he enjoyed its golden age, with Darko Panchev, Vujadin Stanojkovikj, Dragan Kanatlarovski, Vasil Ringov, Dragan Setinov and Savevski forming that great squad. He stood out as a sober and reliable defender during his four seasons with the capital club, which led to his signing by Yugoslavia's top club, Red Star Belgrade, at the end of the 1988 season, for which he played until 1992.There he won three league titles and a Cup, reaching the pinnacle of football history at club level with the 1990-91 European Cup triumph.After another season at the Belgrade club, where he won another league title and the Intercontinental Cup, Najdoski made a transfer to Real Valladolid.The transfer fee was estimated at 50 million pesetas, and Najdoski joined a club in August 1992. The Macedonian defender settled into the team, emerging as an extraordinary defender, tough and courageous, who provided security to the whiteviolet defense. The team achieved promotion, and Najdoski played 23 matches, scoring two goals, both from free kicks.In his second season at the club, he played in the Spanish Primera División in 1993–94. Valladolid had to play a relegation playoff, but managed to stay in the league. Najdoski played in 31 matches in the top flight of Spanish football, but at the end of the season, at the age of 30, the defender left the club. The press later reported that his integration had not been successful, and that he had problems with learning the language during his time in Spain. Later he transfer to Denizlispor in Turkey's Süper Lig.He joined Denizlispor, newly promoted to the Turkish First Division, for the 1994–95 season, where he played for one season, during which the club secured survival by finishing 15th. Najdoski was a starter, playing in 28 of the 34 matches that season.The following season, he changed teams again, signing for FC Sion in the Swiss Super League at the age of 32. Despite the club winning both the Swiss League and Cup, he decided to hang up his boots at the end of the 1996–97 season

== International career ==
Najdoski represented both Yugoslavia and Republic of Macedonia in international matches. Even after Macedonian independence, he was included in the Yugoslav squad for Euro 1992, but the nation would be suspended due to the Yugoslav Wars.

Najdoski later played in the first ever official match of Macedonia, played on 13 October 1993, against Slovenia. His final international was a March 1996 friendly match against Malta.

== Honours ==
- FK Pobeda

Champion : 1980–81

- Red Star Belgrade

Champion : 1989–90, 1990–91, 1991–92
Cup Winner : 1989–90, 1992–93
European Champions League
Winner (1): 1990–91
Intercontinental Cup
Winner (1): 1991

- FC Sion

Champion : 1996–97
Cup Winner : 1996–97

== Personal life ==
He is the father of Macedonian player Dino Najdoski.

Najdoski is an ethnic Aromanian.
