= Macedonian Republic Football League =

Football league in former Yugoslavia

Macedonian Republic Football League (Macedonian: Македонска републичка фудбалска лига, romanized: Makedonska republička fudbalska liga) was the highest football league in the Socialist Republic of Macedonia within the Yugoslav football system. During the time of SFR Yugoslavia, it was third level league for most of the time and the winner was usually promoted to Yugoslav Second League.

== Winners ==
SR Macedonia Within SFRY

Season	Champion	Clubs playing at a higher level
1944–45	Makedonija Skopje	—
1945–46	Pobeda Skopje	—
1946–47	Makedonija Skopje	Pobeda S (I)
1947–48	Dinamo Skopje	Vardar (I), Rabotnički (II)
1948–49	11 Oktomvri Kumanovo	Dinamo, Vardar (II)
1949–50	Rabotnik Bitola	11 Oktomvri, Vardar (II), Rabotnički (III)
1950–51	Rabotnik Bitola	Rabotnički, Vardar (II)
1951–52	Pobeda Prilep	Rabotnički, Vardar (I)
1952–53	Rabotnički Skopje	Vardar (I)
1953–54	Pobeda Prilep	Rabotnički, Vardar (I)
1954–55	Metalec Skopje	Vardar (I), Rabotnički (II)
1955–56	Belasica Strumica	Bregalnica, Metalec, Pobeda, Rabotnički, Rabotnik, Vardar (II)
1956–57	Pelister Bitola	Vardar (I), Belasica, Metalec, Pobeda, Rabotnički (II)
1957–58	Belasica Strumica	Vardar (I), Pelister, Pobeda, Rabotnički, Sloga (II)
1958–59	Pobeda Prilep	Vardar (I), Rabotnički (II)
1959–60	Pelister Bitola	Vardar (II)
1960–61	Pelister Bitola	Vardar (I), Pobeda (II)
1961–62	Pobeda Prilep	Vardar (I)
1962–63	Pobeda Prilep	Vardar (II)
1963–64	Bregalnica Štip	Vardar (I), Pobeda (II)
1964–65	Teteks Tetovo	Vardar (I), Bregalnica, Pobeda (II)
1965–66	Rabotnički Skopje	Vardar (I), Pobeda (II)
1966–67	Bregalnica Štip	Vardar (I), Pobeda, Rabotnički (II)
1967–68	Rabotnički Skopje	Vardar (I), Bregalnica, Pobeda (II)
1968–69	Teteks Tetovo	Vardar (I), Bregalnica, Pobeda, Rabotnički, Tikveš (II)
1969–70	MIK Skopje	Vardar (I), Bregalnica, Pobeda, Rabotnički, Teteks, Tikveš (II)
1970–71	Kumanovo	Bregalnica, MIK, Pobeda, Rabotnički, Teteks, Vardar (II)
1971–72	Tikveš Kavadarci	Vardar (I), Bregalnica, Kumanovo, MIK, Pobeda, Rabotnički, Teteks (II)
1972–73	Rabotnički Skopje	Vardar (I), Bregalnica, Kumanovo, Pobeda, Teteks, Tikveš (II)
1973–74	Teteks Tetovo	Vardar (I), Kumanovo, Pobeda, Rabotnički (II)
1974–75	Pelister Bitola	Vardar (I), Kumanovo, Pobeda, Rabotnički, Teteks (II)
1975–76	Bregalnica Štip	Vardar (I), Pelister, Pobeda, Rabotnički, Teteks (II)
1976–77	Rabotnički Skopje	Bregalnica, Pobeda, Teteks, Vardar (II)
1977–78	Tikveš Kavadarci	Bregalnica, Pobeda, Rabotnički, Teteks, Vardar (II)
1978–79	Pobeda Prilep	Teteks, Tikveš, Vardar (II)
1979–80	Rabotnički Skopje	Vardar (I), Pobeda, Teteks (II)
1980–81	Pobeda Prilep	Vardar (I), Rabotnički, Teteks (II)
1981–82	Pelister Bitola	Teteks, Vardar (I), Pobeda (II)
1982–83	Belasica Strumica	Vardar (I), Pelister, Teteks (II)
1983–84	Bregalnica Štip	Vardar (I), Belasica, Pelister, Teteks (II)
1984–85	Teteks Tetovo	Vardar (I), Belasica, Bregalnica, Pelister (II)
1985–86	Pobeda Prilep	Vardar (I), Belasica, Bregalnica, Pelister, Teteks (II)
1986–87	Metalurg Skopje	Vardar (I), Belasica, Pelister, Pobeda, Teteks (II)
1987–88	Belasica Strumica	Vardar (I), Metalurg, Pelister, Pobeda, Teteks (II)
1988–89	Borec Veles	Vardar (I), Belasica, Pelister (II), Bregalnica, Metalurg, Ljuboten, Osogovo, Pobeda, Sileks, Teteks (III-E)
1989–90	Balkan Skopje	Vardar (I), Pelister (II), Belasica, Borec, Bregalnica, Metalurg, Pobeda, Sileks, Teteks (III-E)
1990–91	Makedonija Gjorče Petrov	Pelister, Vardar (II), Balkan, Borec, Bregalnica, Pobeda, Sileks, Teteks (III-E)
1991–92	Sasa Makedonska Kamenica	Pelister, Vardar (I), Balkan, Teteks (II), Belasica, Borec, Bregalnica, Makedonija GjP, Osogovo, Pobeda, Sileks (III-E)

=== Performance by club ===
Club	Titles	Years won
Pobeda Prilep	8	1952, 1954, 1959, 1962, 1963, 1979, 1981, 1986
Rabotnički Skopje	6	1953, 1966, 1968, 1973, 1977, 1980
Pelister Bitola	5	1957, 1960, 1961, 1975, 1982
Teteks Tetovo	4	1965, 1969, 1974, 1985
Bregalnica Štip	4	1964, 1967, 1976, 1984
Belasica Strumica	4	1956, 1958, 1983, 1988
Makedonija Skopje	2	1945, 1947
Kumanovo	2	1949, 1971
Rabotnik Bitola	2	1950, 1951
Tikveš Kavadarci	2	1972, 1978
MIK Skopje	2	1955, 1970
Pobeda Skopje	1	1946
Dinamo Skopje	1	1948
Metalurg Skopje	1	1987
Borec Veles	1	1989
Balkan Skopje	1	1990
Makedonija Gjorče Petrov	1	1991
Sasa Makedonska Kamenica	1	1992

== Sources ==
- 50 godini fudbal vo makedonija 1919–1969, Football Federation of North Macedonia, 1969
- Ilija Atanasovski: Ние сме големо семејство на фудбалот, Football Federation of Macedonia, 2005
