= FK Pitu Guli =

Association football club in Kruševo, North Macedonia

- Full name: Fudbalski klub Pitu Guli Kruševo
- Founded: 1945
- Ground: Stadion Ezero
- Capacity: 500
- League: Macedonian Third League (Region 4)
- 2025–26: 5th
| Home colours | Away colours |

FK Pitu Guli (Macedonian: ФК Питу Гули) is a football club based in the city Kruševo in North Macedonia. It competes in the Macedonian Third League (Region 4).

== History ==
The club was founded in 1945. It is named after the local revolutionary leader Pitu Guli.

Ilija Najdoski and Goce Sedloski played for the club.
