= FK Rabotnik =

ФК Работник FK Rabotnik
- Full name: Fudbalski klub Rabotnik Bitola
- Founded: 1945; 81 years ago
- Ground: Tumbe Kafe Stadium
- Capacity: 8,000
- Chairman: Ilče Dimovski
- League: OFS Bitola
- 2013–14: Macedonian Third League (Southwest), 15th (relegated)
Home colours	Away colours

FK Rabotnik (Macedonian: ФК Работник) is a football club based in the city of Bitola, North Macedonia. They currently play in the OFS Bitola league.

== History ==
The club was founded in 1945.

In January 2012, FK Pelister and FK Rabotnik made a co-operation agreement and several players have been loaned between the two clubs.

== Honours ==
(Socialist Republic of Macedonia) Macedonian Republic League:

- Winners (2): 1950, 1951
