= FK Teteks =

Macedonian football club

Coordinates: 42°1′4.814″N 20°58′44.538″E

Тетекс 1953 (North Macedonia)
- Full name: Football club Teteks Tetovo / Фудбалски клуб Тетекс Тетово
- Nickname: Штофари (The Tailors)
- Founded: 18 February 1953; 73 years ago
- Ground: AMS Sportski Centar, Tetovo (temporarily)
- Capacity: 2,000
- Chairman: Boban Vucheski
- Manager: Marjan Bilbiloski
- League: Macedonian Second League
- 2025–26: 10th
- Website: https://fkteteks.mk/
Home colours	Away colours

FK Teteks (Macedonian: ФК Тетекс) is a professional football club from the city of Tetovo in North Macedonia. They are currently competing in the Macedonian Second League.

== History ==
Tetovo is a city with one of the oldest football tradition in Macedonia. The football club Ljuboten was formed in the distant 1910s and, together with Vardar, were the oldest clubs in the Macedonia. Numerous Tetovo residents paraded through the ranks of this club, instilling a love for this sport among the population and leading football to quickly become the most important side job in the world and in the Tetovo region. In 1946, there was a club from Tetovo called Šar Tetovo, and it competed in the Macedonian Republic League and Macedonian Cup. It won the Macedonian Cup two times in 1948 and 1950, and was successful in the Macedonian League. However, it was dissolved after a few years, mostly because of financial difficulties. Not much long after this, a new club was founded on the base of FK Šar, named Tekstilec.The founder of FK Teteks is the Woollen Mill Teteks and because of this they are known as "Štofari" (Tailors).

In 1953, just two years into the existence of the Woollen Mill "Todor Tsipovski-Mergjan" known as "Teteks", on February 18, 1953, at the initiative of Andro Jankovski, then commercial director of the Mill, and the famous sports worker and football enthusiast Aleksandar Apostolov, the Football Club TEXTILEC was formed within the Mill.The formation of Tekstilec, which would bear this name until 1961, when it was renamed FC Teteks, was conditioned by the need, as it was said at the time, for the development of sports among the employs. They were in the shadow of the older club FK Ljuboten (formed in 1919). FK Ljuboten's squad was full with homegrown players from Tetovo, while Teteks had the capability to attract the best players from Macedonia and wider from the former Federation.The 1950s were a boom year for football in the city beneath the Shar Planina Mountains. Matches between local rivals Tekstilec and Ljuboten always attracted large crowds to the old city stadium, which was then new, surrounded by walls and with a concrete stand built in 1952.These were real sporting events for the city and the surrounding area, which were the subject of discussions long before they took place and for a long time afterwards. Simply put, the city lived with and for football. Football fans in Tetovo were divided into two camps, and a healthy competition developed between the teams, which inevitably led to a higher quality of the game. They won the Macedonian Republic League on four occasions and along with Vardar, was the only other Macedonian club to have won the Federal EasternFederal Second League containing teams from 3 federal Republics: Macedonia, Montenegro and Serbia.It was precisely the entry into the First Federal League that would be the occasion for the start of the construction of the new City Stadium, as the home of Teteks. The stadium began to be built in 1981 at the initiative of The General Director of the Teteks Combine, Stojan Gjorceski, and it is the combine that will participate with 90% in financing the construction of the new stadium, which since its completion in 1984 has become the home of the Teteks Football Club.

Teteks played in the inaugural Macedonian First League, but finished 17th and were relegated. The club was bought by a German concern UFA Media Group with Braco Vujchik as chairman. After winning the Macedonian Second League in 2009, they were promoted back to the top level of Macedonian football, for the 2009/2010 season. Teteks claimed their first Macedonian Football Cup in 2010 and in the summer made their European debut in the UEFA Europa League. In 2013, Teteks made history by becoming the first relegated team in Macedonia to win the national Cup.

Derby of Tetovo – Tetovo's big derby match used to take place between FK Teteks, whose fans are working class, and FK Ljuboten, whose fans are the oldest citizens of Tetovo.

At the end of July 2020, teteks management took over the second-division club FK Labunishta in 2011, and moved the club to Tetovo. According to the move, the club is scheduled to be named Labunishta 2011, in the first half of the season and Tetek 1953, in the second half of the season.

== Teteks Arena ==
The City Park Stadium is the home ground of FK Teteks. Its built by Teteks Confection Company the owners of FK Teteks Football club. Its last expansion is done in 1980. The Arena has a capacity of 12 000 seats with one fully covered stand .

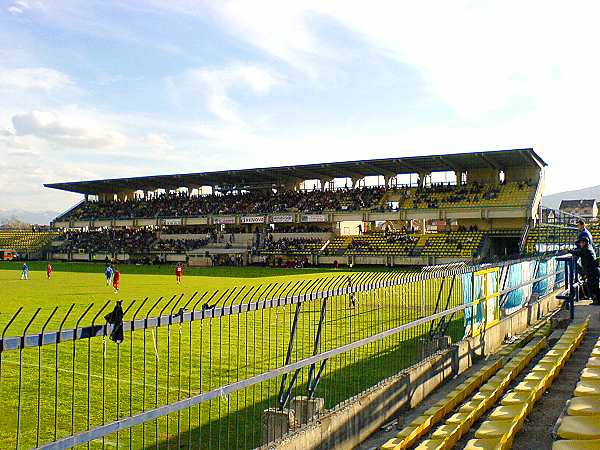
Teteks Arena

== Honours ==
(North Macedonia) (Socialist Republic of Macedonia) Champions (4):

1st: 1965, 1969, 1974, 1985

(Socialist Republic of Macedonia) Federal Second league:

1st: 1981

(North Macedonia) Macedonian Second League:

1st: 2009

(North Macedonia) (Socialist Republic of Macedonia) Cup Winners (6):

1st: 1948,1950,1978, 1982, 2010, 2013
2nd:2011, 2015

(North Macedonia) Macedonian Supercup:

2nd: 2013

== Recent seasons ==
Season	League									Cup	European competitions	
Season	Division	P	W	D	L	F	A	Pts	Pos	Cup	European competitions	
1992–93	1. MFL	34	12	6	16	35	56	30	17th ↓			
1993–94	2. MFL West	26	12	5	9	44	34	29	3rd			
1994–95	2. MFL West	32	16	2	14	53	51	50	5th			
1995–96	2. MFL West	30	13	5	12	45	35	44	6th			
1996–97	2. MFL West	29	16	5	8	46	21	53	3rd			
1997–98	2. MFL West	30	14	6	10	43	30	48	3rd			
1998–99	2. MFL West	30	19	5	6	69	30	62	2nd			
1999–00	2. MFL West	34	21	5	8	93	34	68	3rd			
2000–01	2. MFL	34	15	6	13	56	40	51	10th			
2001–02	2. MFL	34	15	3	16	55	38	48	9th	R1		
2002–03	2. MFL	36	20	6	10	66	33	66	3rd	R2		
2003–04	2. MFL	32	14	10	8	53	30	52	4th			
2004–05	2. MFL	33	17	5	11	46	31	56	5th			
2005–06	2. MFL	30	11	2	17	36	45	35	10th	QF		
2006–07	2. MFL	33	16	6	11	48	32	54	3rd	R1		
2007–08	2. MFL	32	14	5	13	32	30	47	7th	R2		
2008–09	2. MFL	29	18	9	2	50	13	63	1st ↑	R1		
2009–10	1. MFL	26	8	6	12	31	30	30	7th	W		
2010–11	1. MFL	33	12	8	13	38	36	44	7th	RU	Europa League	QR2
2011–12	1. MFL	33	8	11	14	23	48	35	10th	QF		
2012–13	1. MFL	33	6	7	20	22	47	25	11th ↓	W		
2013–14	2. MFL	29	18	6	5	54	20	60	2nd ↑	SF	Europa League	QR1
2014–15	1. MFL	33	3	6	24	22	73	15	10th ↓	RU		
2015–16	2. MFL	27	10	9	8	27	25	39	4th	R1		
2016–17	2. MFL	27	7	7	13	16	29	28	8th	R2		
2017–18	2. MFL West	27	12	3	12	40	42	39	6th	QF		
2018–19	2. MFL West	27	9	5	13	28	34	32	8th ↓	R1		
2019–20^{1}	3. MFL West	11	8	2	1	32	6	26	2nd ↑	N/A		
2020–21	2. MFL West	27	8	3	15	19	34	27	7th	PR		
2021–22	2. MFL West	27	10	6	11	32	44	36	5th	PR		
2022–23	2. MFL	30	9	4	17	31	78	31	13th	R1		
2023–24	2. MFL	30	7	6	17	32	60	27	15th ↓	R1		
2024–25	3. MFL West	24	21	2	1	85	18	65	1st ↑	PR		
2025–26	2. MFL	30	13	3	14	56	44	42	10th	R1		

^{1}The 2019–20 season was abandoned due to the COVID-19 pandemic in North Macedonia.

== Teteks in Europe ==
Season	Competition	Round	Club	Home	Away	Aggregate
2010–11	UEFA Europa League	Second qualifying round	(Latvia) FK Ventspils	3–1	0–0	3–1
2010–11	UEFA Europa League	Third qualifying round	(Sweden) IF Elfsborg	1–2	0–5	1–7
2013–14	UEFA Europa League	First qualifying round	(Armenia) FC Pyunik	1–1	0–1	1–2

== Current squad ==
As of 15 September 2026

Note: Flags indicate national team as defined under FIFA eligibility rules; some limited exceptions apply. Players may hold more than one non-FIFA nationality.

No.	Pos.	Nation	Player
1	GK	MKD	Ili Ziberi
2	DF	MKD	Zlatko Radeski
3	DF	MKD	Bojan Ristoski
5	DF	MKD	Petar Obadikj
6	MF	MKD	Luka Atanasovski
7	FW	MKD	Hisar Ali
8	MF	MKD	Agon Elmazi
9	FW	MKD	Luka Gavroski
10	MF	MKD	Meriton Saliji
11	FW	MKD	Azis Jamini
12	GK	MKD	Pavel Grbevski
14	MF	MKD	Edis Bajrami
15	DF	MKD	David Ljushev
16	MF	MKD	Slavcho Misajlovski
17	MF	MKD	Fatlum Selmani

No.	Pos.	Nation	Player
18	MF	MKD	Aleksandar Anastasijeski
19	FW	MKD	Nikola Ristevski (on loan from FK Vardar)
20	MF	MKD	Marko Kish
21	MF	MKD	Ramin Alii
22	MF	MKD	Martin Jovanoski
23	DF	MKD	Altin Nuredinovski
44	MF	MKD	Altin Murati
99	FW	MKD	Ivan Galevski
—			
—			
—			
—			
—			
—			

== Historical list of coaches ==
- (North Macedonia) Toni Jakimovski (2008 – Jun 2011)
- (North Macedonia) Dragi Setinov (29 Jul 2011 – 24 Sep 2012)
- (North Macedonia) Gjorgji Todorovski (25 Sep 2012 – 19 Mar 2013)
- (North Macedonia) Gorazd Mihajlov (19 Mar 2013 - 31 Jul 2013)
- (North Macedonia) Zoran Smileski (Jul 2013 – May 2014)
- (North Macedonia) Zoran Boshkovski (interim) (7 May 2014 - Jun 2014)
- (North Macedonia) Dobrinko Ilievski (1 Jul 2014 - 4 Sep 2014)
- (North Macedonia) Gjorgji Todorovski (Sep 2014 - Mar 2015)
- (North Macedonia) Gorazd Mihajlov (19 Mar 2015 – 30 Jun 2015)
- (North Macedonia) Ivica Jovanoski (2016–17)
- (North Macedonia) Miroslav Jakovljević (2018–)
- (North Macedonia) Gjorgji Todorovski (2019 -)

== Supporters ==
The supporters of FK Teteks are named Vojvodi (Dukes) since 28 October 1988. They are also known as Vojvodi Jug (South Dukes) because their home side tribune is on the south side. The Vojvodi's well-known motto is "Со Верба Во Бог – Војводи До Гроб" (With trust in God, Dukes until the grave). They have a great relations with FK Vardar fans, Komiti Skopje.
