= FK Ovče Pole =

- Full name: Fudbalski klub Ovče Pole Sveti Nikole
- Founded: 1925; 101 years ago
- Ground: Gradski stadion Sveti Nikole
- Chairman: Mile Kostov
- League: Macedonian Third League (Region 3)
- 2025–26: 2nd
- Website: https://fk.ovcepole.mk/
Home colours	Away colours

FK Ovče Pole (Macedonian: ФК Овче Поле) is a football club from Sveti Nikole, North Macedonia. They are currently competing in the Macedonian Third League (Region 3).

== History ==
The club was founded in 1925 and has established itself as one of the oldest clubs in the Republic of North Macedonia. The club was formed by local merchants and craftsmen. Football as a game was accepted with great pleasure by the local population in the Sveti Nikole Municipality, which as a game for the specific urban environment, through the football game and expressed the culture of living of the population.

At the very beginning, the game was played in the natural meadows of Suvo Pole and others areas, but as football evolved and became increasingly more organized, the need arose to construct a modern stadium which would provide better conditions for playing football.

The City Stadium was built in 1965 in the Sveti Nikole Municipality with construction costs assisted by local companies. Construction began a real renaissance of Ovče Pole Sveti Nikole in the coming years, which saw the club achieve its greatest success, playing in the Macedonian Republic League for the first time in the 1970–71 season. The club won first place in the first part of the championship.

The greater names from that generation are: Panche Kocev, Ratko Milanov, Vane Stoilev, Blagoj Mishev, Lazo Andronikov and others. Ovče Pole saw players who emerged and achieved a lot in their careers. Particularly, Gordan Zdravkov played in the Yugoslav First League with FK Vardar, participant in the UEFA Champions League and the international player, Robert Petrov the player of the North Macedonia national football team, Angel Efremov the goalkeeper of FK Vardar, Andreja Efremov the goalkeeper of FK Metalurg Skopje and FK Rabotnički and the player of the North Macedonia national under-21 football team and the others.

In the club into the past he worked a youth team that took care of future of the football in his city, but one of the most important benefits that any and Sveti Nikole experienced constant promotion through the football club Ovče Pole.

== Supporters ==
The Ovče Pole supporters are called Ovčari.

== Current squad ==
Note: Flags indicate national team as defined under FIFA eligibility rules; some limited exceptions apply. Players may hold more than one non-FIFA nationality.

No.	Pos.	Nation	Player
1	GK	MKD	Kristijan Atanasov
15	GK	MKD	Mario Sandevski
22	MF	MKD	Rade Zdravkov
12	DF	MKD	Zlate Todorov
18	DF	MKD	Nikola Lazev
6	DF	MKD	Emil Runcevski
5	DF	MKD	Aleksandar Kostov
6	DF	MKD	Sase Sokolov
4	DF	MKD	Todor Miroslavev
2	DF	MKD	Ile Nacev
19	DF	MKD	Naum Milevski

No.	Pos.	Nation	Player
7	MF	MKD	Aleksandar Mladenovski
8	MF	MKD	Trajche Iliev
10	MF	MKD	Jordancho Trendafilov
13	MF	MKD	Viktor Donevski
15	MF	MKD	Ivan Runtev
11	MF	MKD	Viktor Trendafilov
13	MF	MKD	Mario Panev
21	MF	MKD	Filip Mitkov
17	FW	MKD	Marko Peshevski
9	FW	MKD	Nikolce Simonov
19	FW	MKD	Darko Nacev
