= Novaci, North Macedonia =

Novaci Новаци
- Village
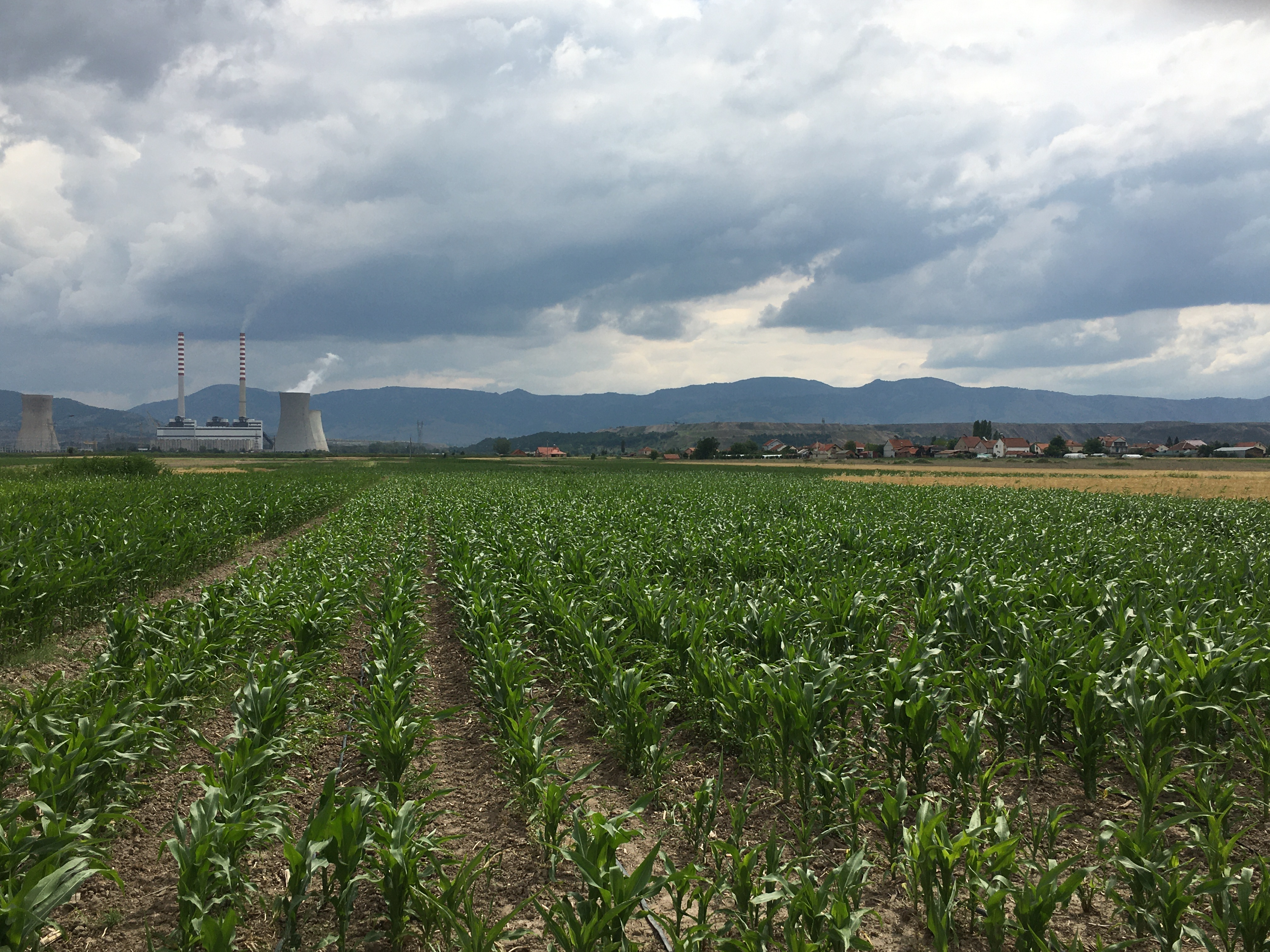
- View of the village, along with REK Bitola

- Location within North Macedonia
- Country: North Macedonia
- Region: Pelagonia
- Municipality: Novaci

Population (2002)
  - Total: 1,283
- Time zone: UTC+1 (CET)
  - Summer (DST): UTC+2 (CEST)
- Vehicle registration: BT
- Website: .

Novaci (Macedonian: Новаци) is a village in North Macedonia. It is the seat of the Novaci Municipality.

== Economy ==
The inhabitants are mainly farmers and livestock breeders, and some of them are employed in the local plants: REK Bitola, ZK Pelagonija and Macedonian Woods.

== Demographics ==
According to the 1467-68 Ottoman defter, the village had 60 houses, 4 bachelors and 4 widows. The village predominantly displayed Slavic anthroponymy, with a small minority of instances of heads of families having traditional Albanian names, usually alongside a Slavic one.

According to the 2002 census, the village had a total of 1283 inhabitants. Ethnic groups in the village include:

- Macedonians 1281
- Others 2

== Sports ==
Local football club FK Novaci plays in the Macedonian Third League (Southwest Division).
