= Sveti Nikole =

Sveti Nikole Свети Николе (Macedonian)
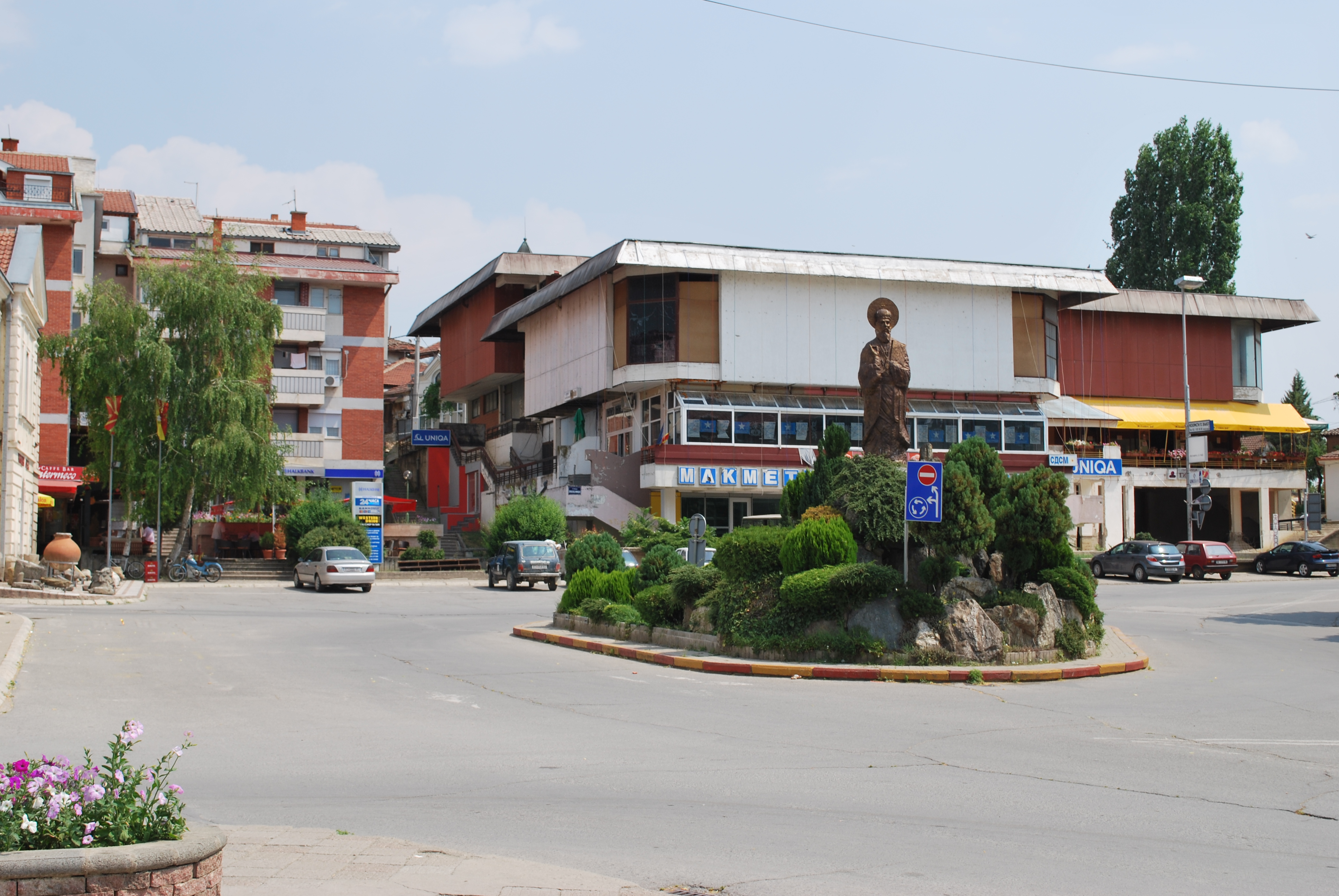
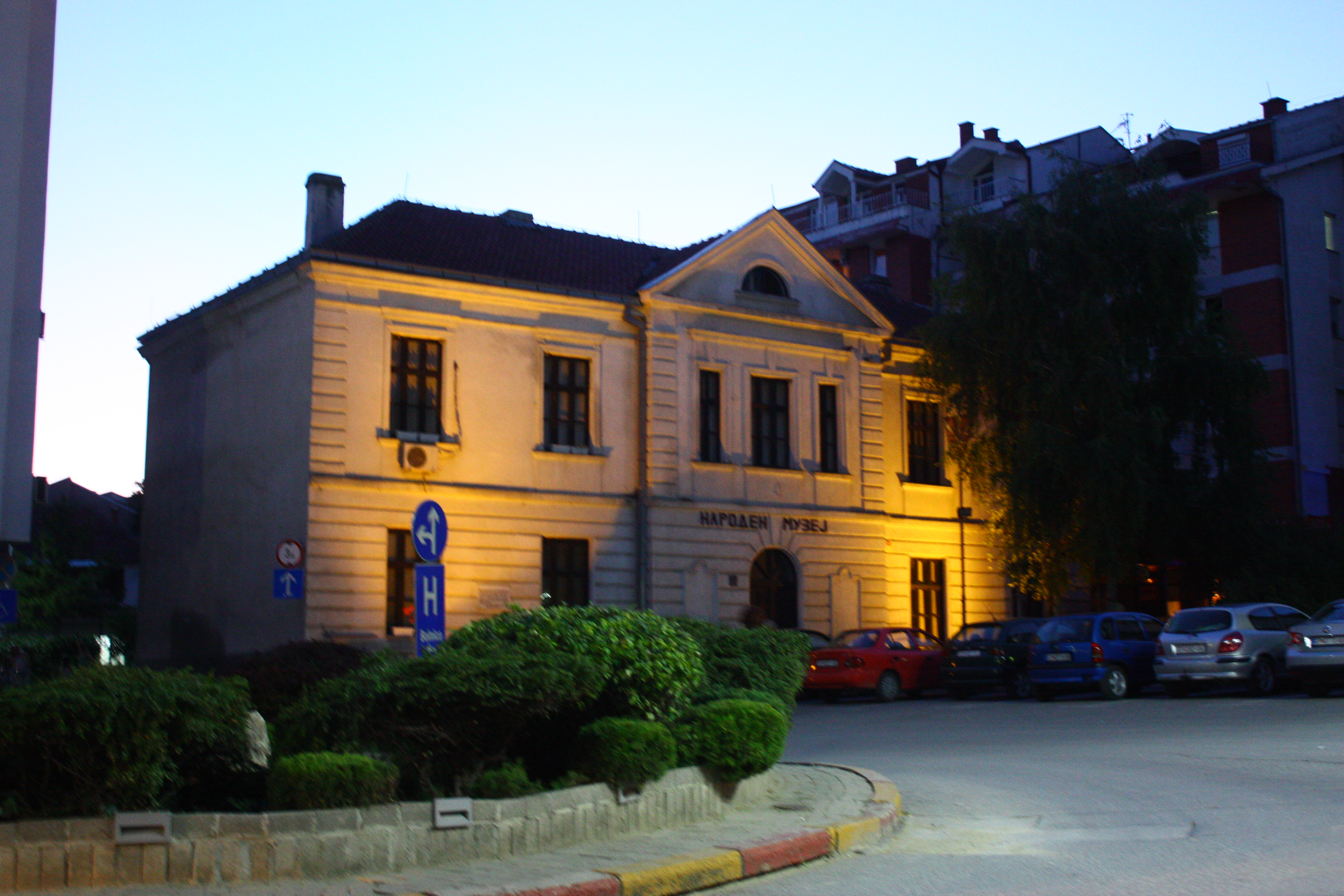
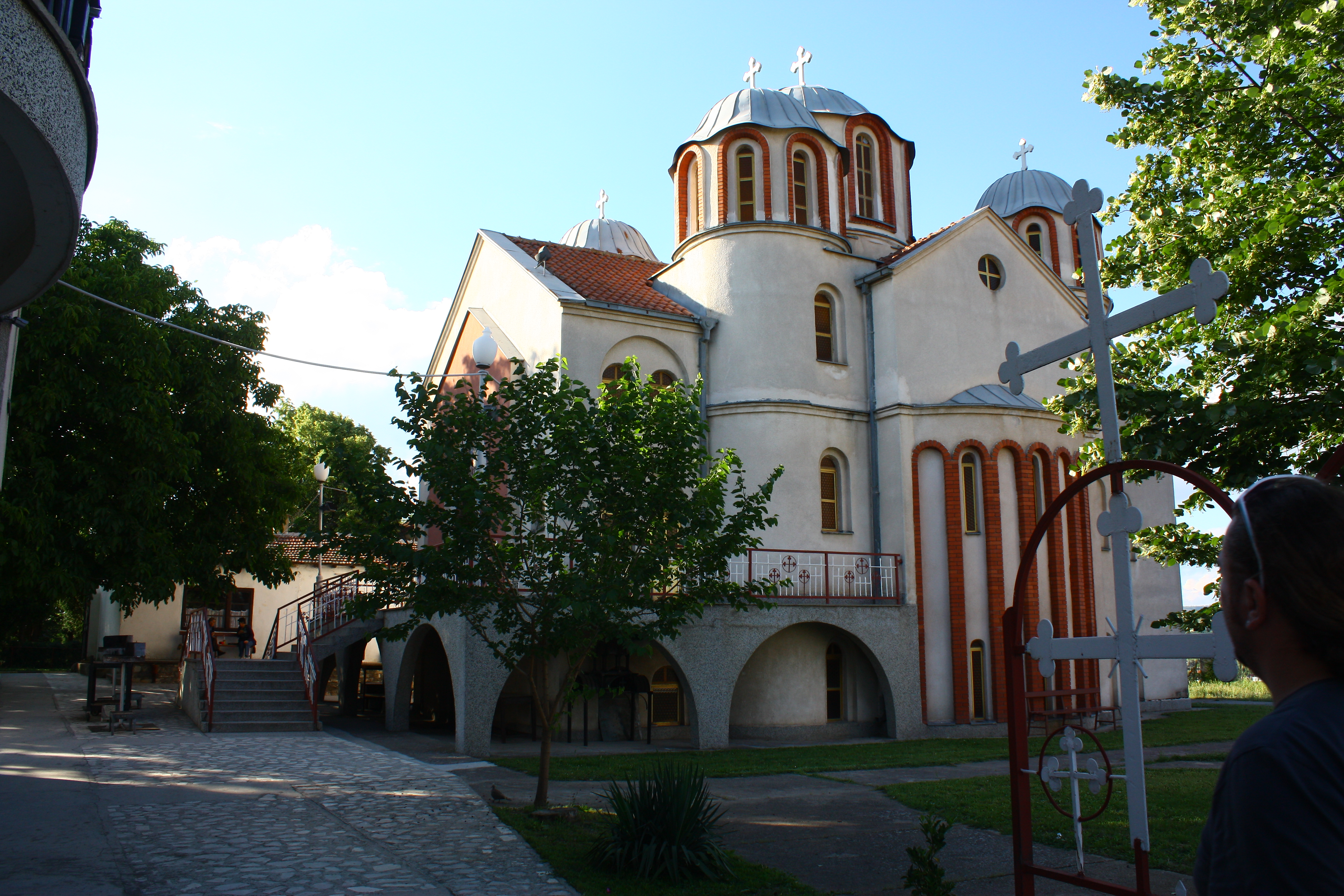
- From the top, Statue of Saint Nicholas, Church of Saint Nicholas, The National Museum

- Flag Seal

- Location within North Macedonia
- Coordinates: 41.864690°N 21.941486°E
- Country: North Macedonia
- Region: Vardar
- Municipality: Sveti Nikole

Government
  - Mayor: Dejan Vladev (VMRO-DPMNE)

Population (2002)
  - Total: 13,746
- Time zone: UTC+1 (CET)
  - Summer (DST): UTC+2 (CEST)
- Postal code: 2220
- Vehicle registration: SN
- Climate: Cfa
- Website: svetinikole.gov.mk

Sveti Nikole (Macedonian: Свети Николе [ˌsvɛːti ˈnikɔlɛ]; meaning Saint Nicholas) is a town in North Macedonia. It is the seat of Sveti Nikole Municipality and a center of a plain called Ovče Pole (Plain of sheep), famous for sheep farming, lamb meat, and dairy products of all kinds.

== History ==
According to legend, the town was named after the church of Saint Nicholas (Sveti Nikola), built in the beginning of the 14th century. It is said to have been the biggest of all 42 churches in this area at its time.

The former settlement of Arbanaško, itself derived from Arbanas (an old South Slavic ethonym for Albanians), is in present-day Sveti Nikole, suggesting either direct linguistic contact with Albanians or the former presence of an assimilated Albanian community.

== Demographics ==
On the 1927 ethnic map of Leonhard Schulze-Jena, the town is written as "Kliseli" shown as having a mixed population of Christian Bulgarians and Turks. According to the 2002 census, the town had a total of 13,746 inhabitants. Ethnic groups in the village include:

- Macedonians 13,367
- Turks 80
- Serbs 52
- Roma 72
- Aromanians 149
- Others 25

== Sports ==
Local football club FK Ovče Pole plays in the Macedonian Third League (Southeast Division).

== Notable people from the town ==
- Lazar Koliševski (1914–2000) - Macedonian politician, prime minister and president
- Kiril Lazarov (b. 1980) - Team handball player
