= FK Pobeda Valandovo =

Pobeda Valandovo
- Full name: Fudbalski klub Pobeda Valandovo
- Founded: 1948; 78 years ago
- Ground: Gradski Stadion Valandovo
- Capacity: 500
- Chairman: Jane Gogov
- League: Macedonian Third League - Region 3
- 2025–26: Macedonian Third League - East, 1st
Home colours	Away colours

FK Pobeda Valandovo (Macedonian: ФК Победа Валандово) is a football club from Valandovo, North Macedonia. They are currently competing in the Macedonian Third League (Region 3).

== History ==
The club was founded in 1948. The club has made the greatest achievement when was won the Macedonian Second League (Eastern group) in the 1994–95 season and was initially promoted to the Macedonian First League, but was expelled for unknown reasons. They return to the Macedonian Second League in the 2002–03 season and was removed from competition after 15th round.

== Honours ==
(North Macedonia) Macedonian Second League:

- Winners (1): 1994–95
