= FK Gostivar (1919) =

Defunct football club in North Macedonia founded in 1919

ФК Гостивар FK Gostivar
- Full name: Fudbalski Klub Gostivar
- Founded: 1919
- Dissolved: 2010
- Ground: Gradski Stadion Gostivar
- Capacity: 1,000

FK Gostivar (ФК Гостивар) was a football club from the city of Gostivar, in present‑day North Macedonia. Founded in 1919, it played home matches at the Gradski Stadion Gostivar (City Stadium Gostivar), which has a capacity of 1,000 spectators. The club is distinct from KF Gostivari, which was established as KF Rinia in 1998 and later renamed; the older FK Gostivar was dissolved in 2010 following a merger with KF Rinia.

== History ==
FK Gostivar was established in 1919 during the period of the Kingdom of Serbs, Croats and Slovenes (later Yugoslavia). It competed in regional and national competitions over much of the twentieth century. In 2010 the club merged with the locally based KF Rinia (founded 1998), after which FK Gostivar was dissolved; the successor organisation continues as KF Gostivari.

== Honours ==
=== League ===
| Competition | Season | Result |
|---|---|---|
| Macedonian Third Football League – North‑West | 1997–98 | Winners |

Honours per MacedonianFootball’s team profile.

== See also ==
- KF Gostivari
