= Makedonska Kamenica =

Makedonska Kamenica Македонска Каменица (Macedonian)
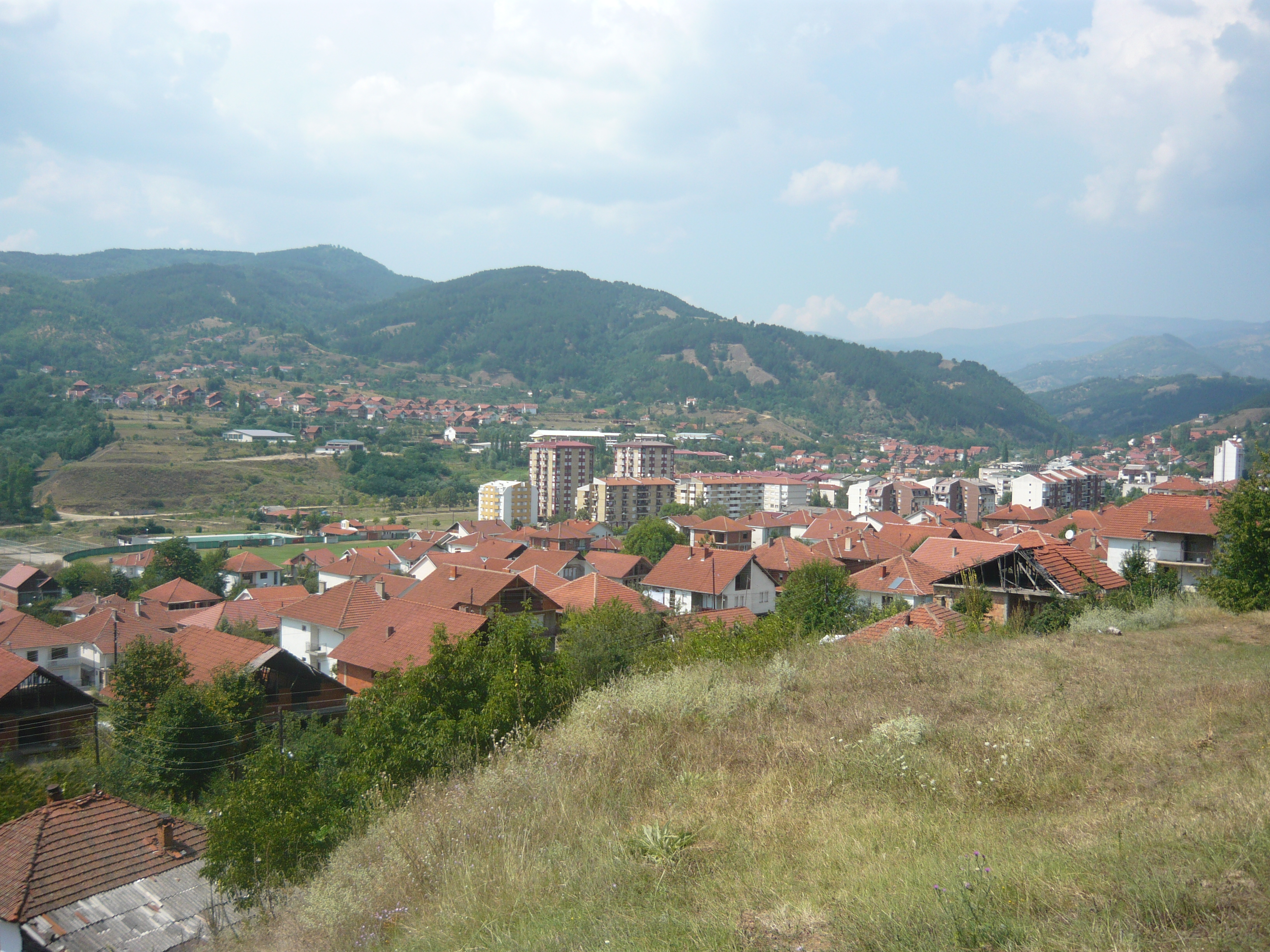
- Panorama view of the town

- Flag Seal

- Location within North Macedonia
- Coordinates: 42°01′11″N 22°35′30″E
- Country: North Macedonia
- Region: Eastern
- Municipality: Makedonska Kamenica

Area
  - Total: 14.3 km^{2} (5.5 sq mi)

Population (2002)
  - Total: 5,147
  - Density: 360/km^{2} (932/sq mi)
- Time zone: UTC+1 (CET)
- Vehicle registration: MK
- Climate: Cfb

Makedonska Kamenica (Macedonian: Македонска Каменица [maˈkɛdɔnska kaˈmɛnitsa]; till 1950 Kamenica) is a town in the north-east of North Macedonia. It has 5,147 inhabitants, the majority of whom are ethnic Macedonians. The town is the seat of Makedonska Kamenica Municipality.

== Demographics ==
According to the 2002 census, the village had a total of 5,147 inhabitants. Ethnic groups in the village include:

- Macedonians 5,096
- Serbs 20
- Romani 14
- Bosniaks 8
- Others 9

== Sports ==
Local football club FK Sasa spent several seasons in the Macedonian top tier and won the Macedonian Republic League in 1992.
