= FK Sasa =

- Full name: Fudbalski klub Kamenica Sasa / Фудбалски клуб Каменица Саса
- Nickname: Рудари (Miners)
- Founded: 1968; 58 years ago
- Ground: Gradski Stadion; Makedonska Kamenica
- Capacity: 5,000
- Chairman: Darko Petrovski
- Manager: Sasho Velinovski
- League: Macedonian Third League (Region 3)
- 2025–26: Second League, 11th (relegated)
- Website: http://fkkamenica-sasa.mk
Home colours	Away colours

FK Kamenica Sasa (Macedonian: ФК Каменица Саса) is a football club from Makedonska Kamenica, Macedonia. They are currently competing in the Macedonian Third League (Region 3).

== History ==
The club was founded in 1968. Their most successful year was when they won the Macedonian Republic Championship in 1992.

== Honours ==
(Socialist Republic of Macedonia) Macedonian Republic League

- Winners: 1991–92

== Supporters ==
The supporters of sasa are known as bageri and they were founded in 1991

== Current squad ==
As of 30 August 2025.

Note: Flags indicate national team as defined under FIFA eligibility rules; some limited exceptions apply. Players may hold more than one non-FIFA nationality.

No.	Pos.	Nation	Player
1	GK	MKD	Simon Stojkovski
2	DF	MKD	Milosh Spasovski
3	DF	MKD	Maksim Slavkov
4	DF	MKD	Hristijan Chukarski
5	DF	MKD	Kristijan Tanevski
6	MF	MKD	Filip Radevski
7	MF	MKD	Bojan Ivanov
8	MF	MKD	Mahir Ajruli
9	MF	MKD	Darijan Trajchov
10	MF	MKD	Muhamed Bekir
11	FW	MKD	Luka Nikolov
14	MF	MKD	Damjan Kjoseski

No.	Pos.	Nation	Player
15	MF	MKD	Andeej Ljubevski
18	MF	MKD	Nikolche Efremov
19	DF	MKD	Lazar Stojanovski
20	MF	MKD	Petar Mitrevski
21	MF	MKD	Toni Michkovski
24	GK	MKD	Martin Milenkovski
32	DF	MKD	Gligorche Efremov
69	MF	MKD	Filip Spendjarski
77	DF	MKD	Alen Milenkovski
88	FW	MKD	Mario Adjiev
99	FW	MKD	Andrej Simevski
