= FK Vardarski =

- Full name: Fudbalski klub Vardarski Bogdanci
- Founded: 1969; 56 years ago
- Ground: Gradski Stadion Bogdanci
- Capacity: 500
- League: Macedonian Third League
- 2024–25: Macedonian Second League, 16th (relegated)
| Home colours | Away colours |

FK Vardarski (Macedonian: ФК Вардарски) is a football club from Bogdanci, Republic of Macedonia. They are currently competing in the Macedonian Third League.

== History ==
The club was founded in 1969. Their greatest success are the playing in the Macedonian First Football League in the inaugural season (1992–93).

Cvetan Churlinov started his career with the team.

== Current squad ==
As of 15 February 2025.

Note: Flags indicate national team as defined under FIFA eligibility rules; some limited exceptions apply. Players may hold more than one non-FIFA nationality.

| No. | Pos. | Nation | Player |
|---|---|---|---|
| 1 | GK | (North Macedonia) MKD | Andrej Danchevski Danstak |
| 2 | MF | (North Macedonia) MKD | Kristijan Dimitrov |
| 3 | DF | (North Macedonia) MKD | Risto Milenkovikj |
| 4 | DF | (North Macedonia) MKD | Hristijan Bejkov |
| 5 | DF | (North Macedonia) MKD | Ahmed Domazet |
| 7 | DF | (North Macedonia) MKD | Luka Jakimovski |
| 9 | FW | (North Macedonia) MKD | Elmaz Emush |
| 10 | MF | (North Macedonia) MKD | Miron Ilievski |
| 11 | MF | (North Macedonia) MKD | Marko Sofijanoski |
| 12 | GK | (North Macedonia) MKD | Filip Lazarevski |
| 14 | MF | (North Macedonia) MKD | Filip Radevski |
| 17 | FW | (North Macedonia) MKD | David Ashovaliev |
| 18 | MF | (North Macedonia) MKD | Slave Tanov |

| No. | Pos. | Nation | Player |
|---|---|---|---|
| 19 | MF | (North Macedonia) MKD | Adam Stojanov |
| 20 | FW | (North Macedonia) MKD | Darijan Trajchov |
| 22 | MF | (North Macedonia) MKD | Stojanche Kostadinovski |
| 23 | MF | (North Macedonia) MKD | Blagoj Mendov |
| 24 | FW | (North Macedonia) MKD | Ilija Balamov |
| 33 | DF | (North Macedonia) MKD | Muhamed Ibrahimi |
| 47 | DF | (North Macedonia) MKD | Marko Ristov |
| 57 | DF | (North Macedonia) MKD | Gjeorge Karamitrov |
| 99 | DF | (North Macedonia) MKD | Milosh Spasovski |
| — | MF | (North Macedonia) MKD | Benjamin Demir |
| — | MF | (North Macedonia) MKD | Kristijan Mingov |
| — | MF | (North Macedonia) MKD | Daniel Vasikj |
