= Valandovo =

Valandovo Валандово (Macedonian)
- City
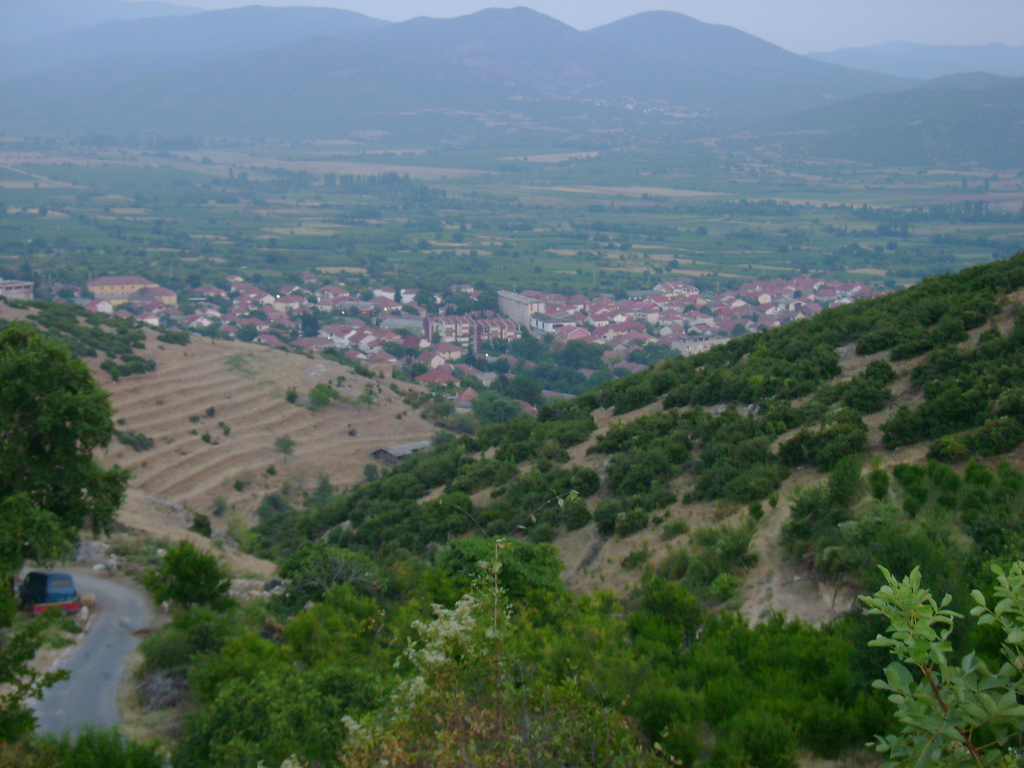

- Flag Coat of arms

- Location within North Macedonia
- Coordinates: 41°19′1″N 22°33′40″E
- Country: North Macedonia
- Region: Southeastern
- Municipality: Valandovo

Government
  - Mayor: Pero Kostadinov (SDSM)

Population (2021)
  - Total: 3.671
- Time zone: UTC+1 (CET)
  - Summer (DST): UTC+2 (CEST)
- Climate: Cfa
- Vehicle registration: VA
- Website: http://www.valandovo.gov.mk/

Valandovo (Macedonian: Валандово [vaˈɫandɔvɔ]) is a small town in southeastern North Macedonia. The city is the seat of Valandovo Municipality.

== History ==
=== Ancient Period ===
Evidence of life can be found beginning in the 10th-7th centuries B.C. There is a settlement known as Mal Konstantinopol (Small Constantinople) dating from Roman times, and the life in the Middle Ages is marked by Markovi Kuli. In the vicinity of the town there is also an archaeological site known as Isar and is located at the village of Marvinci. Also, there are the ancient mosaics of Valandovo, the necropolis discovered near Dedeli dating from the Iron Age, the monastery and the church dedicated to St. George, etc. On the hill Isar, at the village of Marvinci near the town of Valandovo, there is a community from the early antique period called Amphacsitida (Αμφαξίτις) in Ancient Greek meaning "from both sides of Axios (river). The hill is 40 to 45 meters high and is located over the mouth of Anska River, flowing into the Vardar river. The Acropolis of the town was strengthened by defence bulwarks. Most of the architectural findings show the existence of profane living objects, while the last phase shows the possible existence of a ceramic workshop. The construction method in the earlier primitive stages, is very different from the latest stages. According to the archeological findings, the town was first ruined in the 3rd century BC, in time of the Celtic invasion in 279 BC. The excavated construction material shows the cultural and economic development of the town throughout centuries of its survival. In the 5th and 4th century BC, stock was imported from Corinth and Ionia, in Asia Minor. Ceramic from the Iron Age was found in the tombs and Greek amphorae from the classical and late Hellenic period. Apart from the imported ceramics from the big manufacturing centers, there are also local ceramic products with native tradition and often simulating Greek forms. During the Hellenic era, the connections with the neighbouring leading cultural centres: Pela, Beroia, Amphipolis and Thessalonica were strengthened. Ceramic plastic, jewels and coins were made in the pattern of these developed centres. The antique town on the Isar secured its economic development through agriculture, cattle raising and mining. The numerous mines in the region, as well as the pottery craft continued as a tradition in the Roman period.

=== Modern Period ===
In the late 19th and early 20th century, Valandovo was part of the Salonica Vilayet of the Ottoman Empire. In 1913, as a result of the Balkan Wars, the town became a part of the Kingdom of Serbia, which in 1918 joined the Kingdom of the Serbs, Croats and Slovenes. From 1929 to 1941 Valandovo was part of the Vardar Banovina of the Kingdom of Yugoslavia. From 1941 to 1944, during the Axis occupation of Yugoslavia, Valandovo, as most of Vardar Macedonia, was annexed by the Kingdom of Bulgaria.

== Geography and climate ==
Valandovo has a humid subtropical climate. In and around the town, Valandovo figs and pomegranates grow, as do other early-spring vegetables and fruits.

== Population and Ethnicities ==
According to the census performed in 2002, the population of Valandovo Municipality is 11,890 inhabitants.

The ethnic structure of the population living in the Valandovo is:

- Macedonians: 9,830 (82.67%)
- Turks: 1,333 (11.21%)
- Romani: 32 (0.27%)
- Serbs: 639 (5.37%)
- Bosniaks: 1
- Vlachs: 1
- Others: 52 (0.45%)

As of 2021, the city of Valandovo has 3,671 inhabitants, almost exclusively Macedonians, with some other ethnic groups including Serbs and Turks.

== Music Festival ==
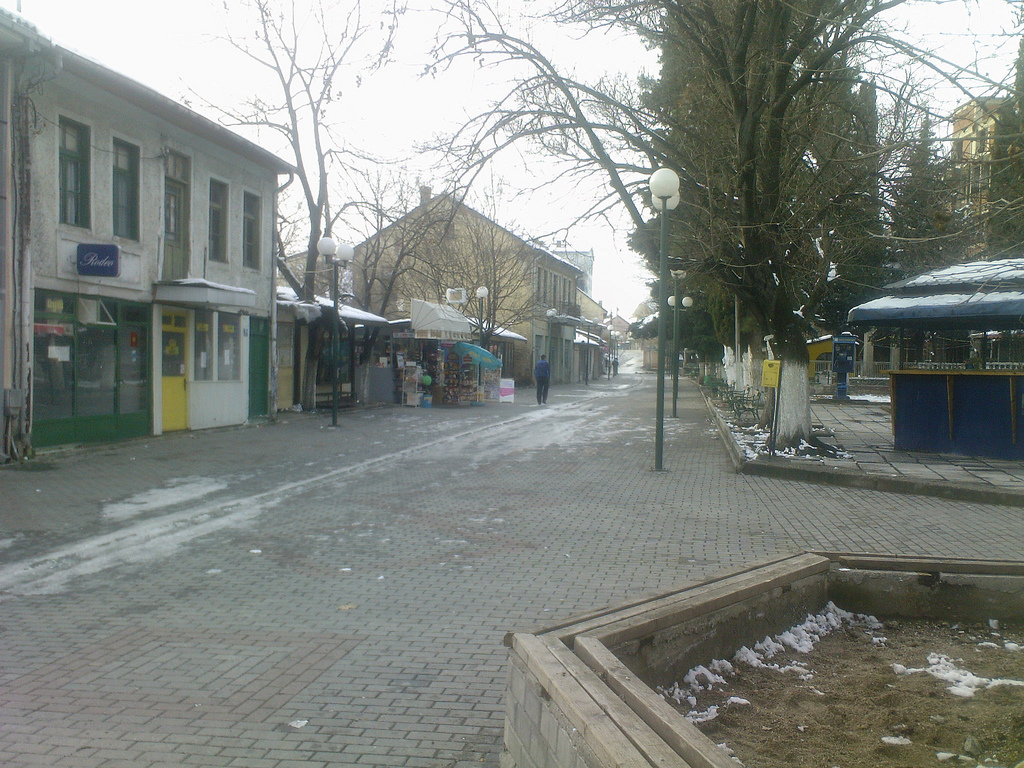
Town center of Valandovo

The town has hosted an annual music festival since 1985. In 1989, a summer festival stage with 1,200 seats was built and all performances from 1985 – 89 were broadcast on television to an estimated audience of 30,000 people. Valandovo musical production has issued 35 audio-cassettes, records and video-cassettes. In 1993, the festival was held in Sydney, Australia.

== Sports ==
The local football club is FK Pobeda and they play in the Macedonian Third League.

== Notable Natives ==
- Gjorge Ivanov, former President of the Republic of Macedonia
- Nano Ružin, 2009 Republic of Macedonia presidential candidate
- Petar Gošev, Governor of the National Bank of North Macedonia
- Blagica Kaleva, folk singer
