= Bogdanci =

Bogdanci Богданци (Macedonian)
- Town
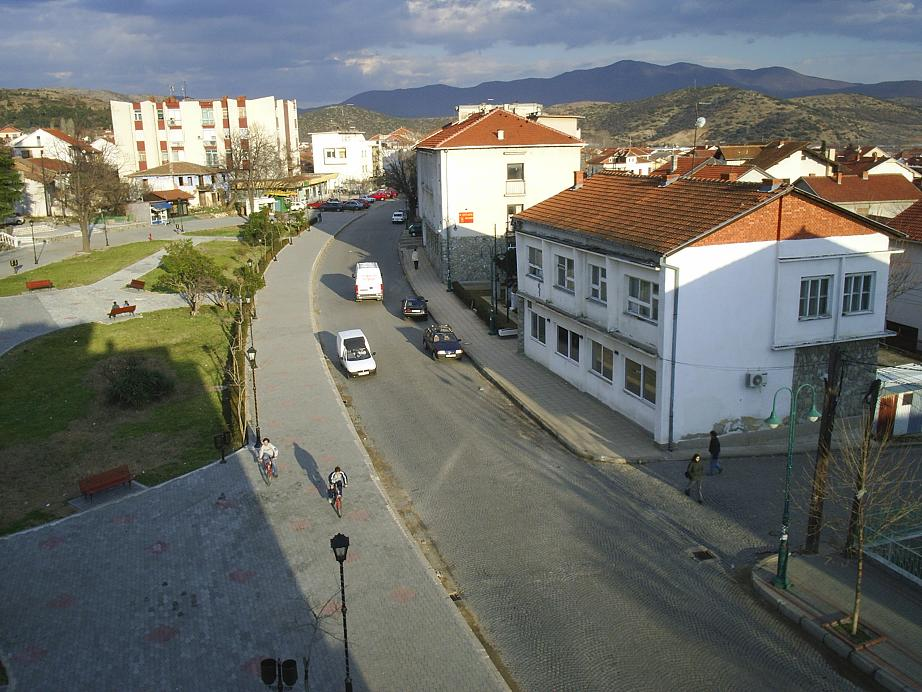

- Flag Coat of arms

- Location within North Macedonia
- Coordinates: 41°12′11″N 22°34′32″E
- Country: North Macedonia
- Region: Southeastern
- Municipality: Bogdanci

Government
  - Mayor: Blazhe Shapov (SDSM)

Area
  - Total: 114.54 km^{2} (44.22 sq mi)
- Elevation: 85 m (279 ft)

Population (2021)
  - Total: 5,244
- Time zone: UTC+1 (CET)
  - Summer (DST): UTC+2 (CEST)
- Postal code: 1484
- Area code: +389
- Vehicle registration: GE
- Climate: Cfa
- Website: https://bogdanci.gov.mk/

Bogdanci (Macedonian: Богданци [ˈbɔɡdantsi]) is a small town in North Macedonia, close to the border with Greece. It is located at around 41°12′11″N 22°34′32″E, and is the seat of Bogdanci Municipality.

== Location ==
The space of the Gevgelian ravine that comprise the space of the Bogdanci field is located in the south and the south east part of North Macedonia. A part of the ravine is in Greece. The region is in the down flow of the river Vardar. There is Kozhuf, the mountain on west, some hills on north, the mountains Belasica and Kara Balija on east and on south it's open to Greece. This location has a vantage point as for the disposition of the space and the traffic connection. The vintage point of Bogdanci in the Gevgelian valley is good. It's on some 80–90 meters attitude above the sea level. There is the expressway E-75 on some 9 km (5.6 mi) on the west side, it's 10 km (6.2 mi) far away from the center of Gevgelija, 7 km (4.3 mi) from the border between Greece and North Macedonia and 5 km (3.1 mi) from the Vardar river. The Dojran Lake and Dojran are on some 20 km (12 mi) on east of Bogdanci. There are some roads passing through the Geveglian – Bogdanci's field, connecting Bogdanci with Gevgelija, Stojakovo, Gjavoto and the expressway E-75. The road that connects Bogdanci with Dojran, Strumica and Valandovo passes through the valley of the river Paljurska. This road connects Gevgelija and Dojran. In the past the road that connect Gevgelija with Greek Macedonia, was very frequent. Bogdanci's good geographical position in the ravine, the traffic importance and the economic function in the region are the reasons that Bogdanci was and still is a dynamic hearth for the gravitation of the settlements from the Dojran's and Gevgelian ravines. In the past the traffic was not developed enough and that's why the relief was the main factor for the intensity of the gravitation occupy in some ways. Most villages of the region that were well connected with Bogdanci gravitated in every sphere with it. Stojakovo, Gjavoto, Bogorodica, Furka, and Crnichani were the villages that gravitated well with Bogdanci, and from the other side Bogdanci gravitated well with Thessaloniki the center of region of Macedonia in that time. Today with the development of the ravine's center Gevgelija the gravitation occupy of Bogdanci is shrank. Near Bogdanci are located the Bogdanci wind turbines.

== Demographics ==
There are 6,011 residents in the town of Bogdanci.

	Number	%
TOTAL	6,011	100
Macedonians	5,761	95.84
Serbs	176	2.92
others	74	1.23

As of 2021, the city of Bogdanci has 5.244 inhabitants and the ethnic composition was the following:

- Macedonians – 4.909
- Serbs - 58
- Turks - 29
- Romani - 12
- Aromanian - 10
- Albanians – 1
- Bosniaks – 1
- others – 36
- Person without Data - 195

== Geographical Information ==
=== Climate ===
The city mainly experiences a Mediterranean climate that enters by the river Vardar and the valley from the Aegean Sea. The Mediterranean climate has more influence in the summer and less in the winter, which allows temperatures to become rather cold in the winter. The city receives fairly little rain, strong winds, and sometimes small amounts of snow during the winter.

==== Temperature ====
The temperature in this region is influenced by the warm air coming from the river Vardar valley in the south. The average yearly temperature in this region is 14.5C. Temperatures do not go below 3.2C.

==== Rains ====
The quantity of rainfall during the year is relatively small, between 600–750 mm. The reasons for this are the geographical position (the place where Bogdanci is located), the distance from the sea, the temperatures and the frequently winds are the most important factor for this little quantity of rain, because they clear the clouds of the sky. November and December are also known as months of the rain. During the summer (June, July, August and September the quantity of rain is the smallest for the whole year). From this we can see that the rainfall is bigger during the vegetation and it goes down when the vegetation is gone, which is pretty bad for the agriculture. The snow (fall) is less than the rainfall. There are around 9 days during the whole year, that the snow cover stays on the earth. The part of the snow in the entire quantity of rainfall() is 7.5%. There are around 55 ice days during the year in bogdanci. The ice, during the vegetation period has a negative influence. The hail is rare, and it appears in the spring (march, April, may).

==== Winds ====
The winds in the ravine of Bogdanci are frequent. They appear during the whole year, and they blow “from all over”. During the summer they decelerate the high temperatures, and they oust the clouds and the fog, which is good for the vegetation, and for the many sunny days during the year. The constant wind in Bogdanci is the wind known as Vardarec, that blows during the winter by the valley of the river Vardar. It blows with some 7.2 m/s, which is strong wind for the region. During the summer it helps us, with decelerating the high temperatures, and during the winter it brings us low temperatures. There are East winds, which are frequent too, and their maximum speed is some 12.5 m/s. The winds that blow from north and northwest are the most frequent, and they blow by the valley of the river Vardar. The sunny days capture most of the days in the years, around 2540 hours every year. This is high value, and the winds help for this with ousting the clouds from the sky. The humidity in average is around 71%, it has lower value in July, and higher in January.

== Sports ==
FK Vardarski is the football club that plays in Bogdanci. The club currently competes in the Macedonian Second League.

RK Mladost Bogdanci is the popular handball club from the city. They currently compete in the EFT Macedonian First League. In the 1996-97 season they made it to the quarterfinal of the EHF Cup Winners' Cup.
