= FK Vardar Negotino =

ФК Вардар Неготино FK Vardar Negotino
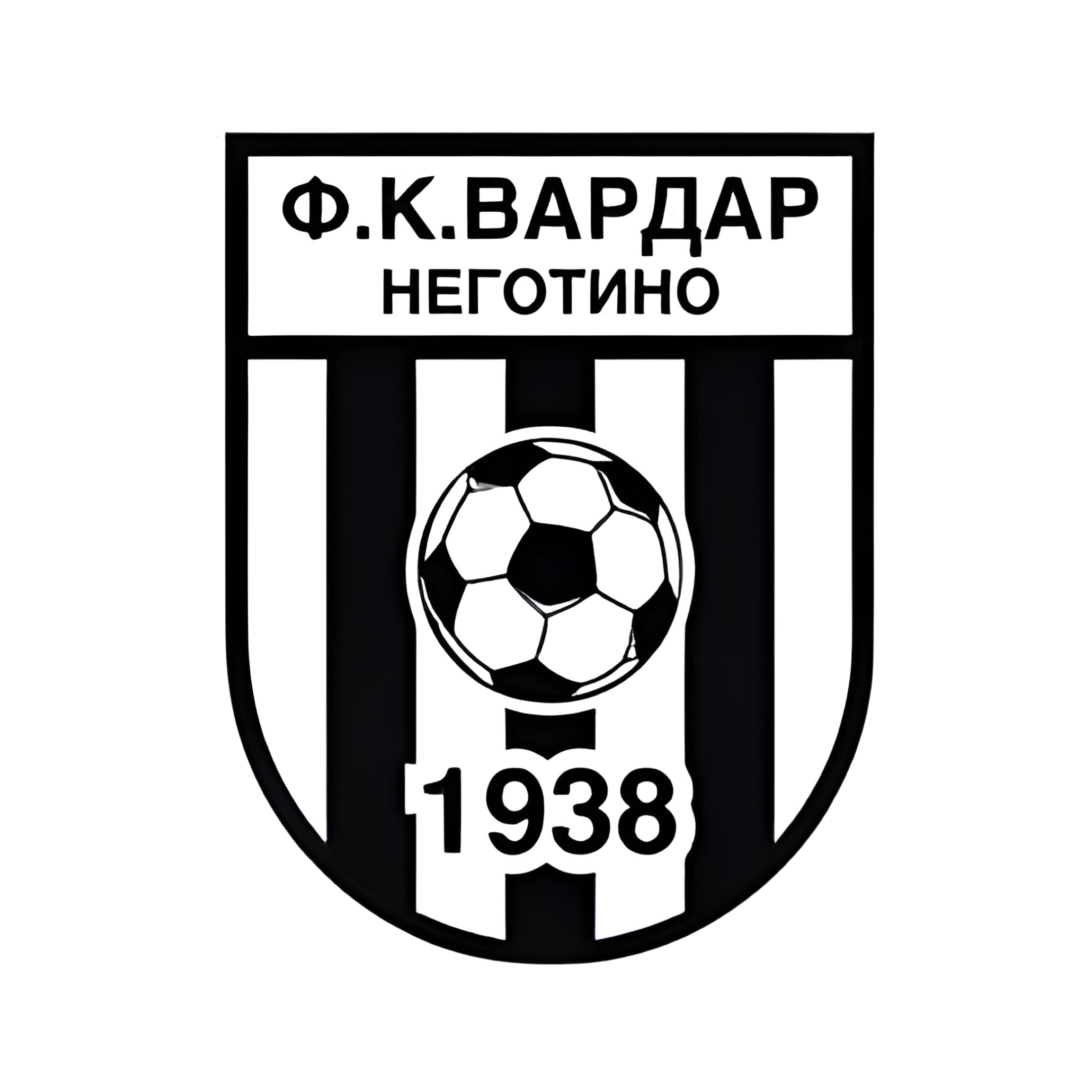
- Full name: Fudbalski klub Vardar Negotino / Фудбалски клуб Вардар Неготино
- Nickname: Винари (Winers)
- Founded: 1938; 88 years ago
- Ground: Cvaj Arena
- Capacity: 1,500
- Chairman: Sashko Krstev
- Manager: Goran Todorchev
- League: Macedonian Third League (Region 4)
- 2025–26: Macedonian Second League, 12th (relegated)
Home colours	Away colours

FK Vardar Negotino (Macedonian: ФК Вардар Неготино) is a football club from Negotino, North Macedonia. They are currently competing in the Macedonian Third League (Region 4).

== History ==
The club was founded in 1938 in Negotino.

== Supporters ==
FK Vardar Negotino supporters are called Vinari (Winers). Vinari are good friends with Komiti Skopje. When supporting the team they use two trumpets and a drum.

== Current squad ==
As of 15 February 2025.

Note: Flags indicate national team as defined under FIFA eligibility rules; some limited exceptions apply. Players may hold more than one non-FIFA nationality.

No.	Pos.	Nation	Player
1	GK	MKD	Jane Kolev
2	DF	MKD	Gligor Shikov
3	DF	MKD	Matej Jordanovski
4	DF	MKD	Marko Stojcheski
5	DF	MKD	Petar Obadikj
6	DF	MKD	Matej Janevski
7	MF	MKD	Martin Nejkovski
8	FW	MKD	Adelin Kjazimov
9	FW	MKD	David Spasov
10	MF	MKD	Kiril Nedelkov
11	MF	MKD	Oliver Todorov
12	GK	MKD	Kristijan Gjorgjievski

No.	Pos.	Nation	Player
13	DF	MKD	Nikola Pavleski
14	MF	MKD	Neven Kostadinov
15	DF	MKD	Blazhe Stavrov
16	DF	MKD	Jovan Smiljkovski
17	MF	MKD	Gjorgji Shishkov
18	MF	MKD	Darko Mojsovski
19	FW	MKD	Martin Mladenovikj
20	FW	MKD	Dimitar Jankulov
21	MF	MKD	Niki Zumrovski
22	MF	MKD	Petar Najdov
23	FW	MKD	Destan Adili
