= FK Rabotnicki =

Rabotnichki
- Full name: Fudbalski klub Rabotnichki Skopje / Фудбалски клуб Работнички Скопје
- Nicknames: Романтичари (Romantics); Железничaри (Railers); Херојот од Дебар маало (The Hero from Debar Quart)
- Founded: 4 October 1937; 89 years ago
- Ground: National Arena Toše Proeski
- Capacity: 33,011
- Chairman: Goran Popovski
- Manager: Bazhe Janakievski
- League: Macedonian Second League
- 2025–26: Macedonian First League, 11th of 12 (relegated)
- Website: fkrabotnicki.com
Home colours	Away colours	Third colours

FK Rabotnichki (Macedonian: ФК Работнички), commonly known as Rabotnichki and occasionally by the nickname "The Romantics" (Macedonian: Романтичари), is a professional football club based in Skopje, North Macedonia. Founded on 4 October 1937, the club plays its home matches at the Toše Proeski Arena, the country's largest stadium, which they share with their city rivals FK Vardar and the North Macedonia national football team. They currently compete in the Macedonian Second Football League.

Considered one of the most successful clubs in Macedonian football history, Rabotnichki has won the Macedonian First League title four times (2004–05, 2005–06, 2007–08, and 2013–14) and the Macedonian Football Cup four times (2007–08, 2008–09, 2013–14, and 2014–15). The club achieved the domestic "Double" (winning both the league and cup in the same season) on two occasions, in 2007–08 and 2013–14.

On the continental stage, Rabotnichki has frequently represented North Macedonia in UEFA competitions. The club reached the play-off round of the UEFA Europa League twice: in the 2011–12 season, where they were eliminated by Lazio, and in the 2015–16 season, where they fell to Rubin Kazan after eliminating Trabzonspor.

The club maintains a fierce rivalry with FK Vardar, known as the "Neighborhood Derby," as both clubs are situated in central Skopje and share the same home ground. While Rabotnički enjoyed a resurgence in the 2024–25 season by finishing third and qualifying for the UEFA Conference League, the 2025–26 campaign proved challenging; as of February 2026, the team was positioned in the relegation zone of the First League table.

== History ==
=== Foundation and Early Years (1937–1991) ===
FK Rabotnichki was founded on 4 October 1937 . The club was initially widely known as the "railway football club" due to its strong connection with the railway workers of Skopje. During the chaotic period of the Second World War, the club temporarily ceased operations or competed under different local structures, but was re-established in 1945 following the liberation of Skopje. Throughout the Yugoslav era, Rabotnički largely competed in the Macedonian Republic Football League and the Federal Second league. While they were often overshadowed by their city rivals FK Vardar, Rabotnichki maintained a reputation as a talent factory and a stable club within the socialist republic's football hierarchy.

=== Independence and The Kometal Era (1992–2008) ===
Following the independence of North Macedonia in 1991, Rabotnichki became a founding member of the Macedonian First Football League (1. MFL). The club's trajectory changed dramatically in 2001 when it was acquired by the company Kometal, led by businessman Trifun Kostovski. This marked the beginning of the club's "Golden Era".

Under the new ownership, Rabotnichki secured their first Macedonian First League title in the 2004–05 season. They successfully defended their crown in the 2005–06 season and won a third title in 2007–08, a season in which they also won the Macedonian Football Cup to complete their first "Double". During this period, the club achieved notable results in European competitions, including reaching the third qualifying round of the UEFA Champions League in 2006 and facing prominent clubs such as Lille OSC and Bolton Wanderers in the UEFA Cup.

=== Continued Success and Transition (2009–2020) ===
After the Kometal sponsorship ended, the club remained a significant force in Macedonian football. Rabotnički won the Macedonian Cup again in the 2008–09 season. They secured their fourth league title in the 2013–14 season, once again achieving the domestic Double by winning the Cup the same year. They added a fourth Cup title to their trophy cabinet in the 2014–15 season. The club continued to regularly qualify for the qualifying rounds of the UEFA Europa League, maintaining a consistent presence on the international stage throughout the 2010s.

=== Recent Years and 2025–26 Season Struggles (2021–Present) ===
The early 2020s saw Rabotnički transition into a mid-table side, often focusing on developing young players. In the 2024–25 season, the club enjoyed a resurgence, finishing 3rd in the Macedonian First League table, which secured them a spot in the UEFA Conference League qualifiers.

However, the subsequent 2025–26 season proved to be difficult for the "Romantics". As of February 2026, the club found itself in a relegation battle, sitting in 11th place out of 12 teams in the First League standings. Despite the poor league form, the team showed signs of fighting spirit with a high-scoring 4–3 away victory against AP Brera Strumica on 20 February 2026.

== Supporters ==
The supporters of FK Rabotnichki are traditionally known as the Romantichari. This nickname reflects the club's historical identity and playing style, often associated with the Debar Maalo neighborhood of Skopje. Unlike their basketball counterparts, KK Rabotnički, who are backed by the organized ultra group "City Park Boys", the football club has lacked a prominent, organized supporters group since 2010. Previous organized groups included "Legija V" (formed in 2008) and "Debar Maalo" (formed in 2009), but these are no longer active in a significant capacity.

The club's main rivalry is with FK Vardar, a match known as the "Neighbor Derby", as both teams share the Toše Proeski Arena. While Vardar is supported by the large "Komiti" group, Rabotnički's support in these derbies is typically composed of a smaller, less organized following of sympathizers and local residents.

== Rivalries ==
FK Rabotnichki's primary rivalry is with fellow Skopje-based club FK Vardar, a fixture known as the "Neighbor Derby". The rivalry is rooted in the close proximity of the two clubs, which both play their home matches at the Park City Stadium, and a contrast in identity: Vardar is traditionally viewed as the "club of the people" with mass support from the "Komiti" ultras, while Rabotnički is identified with the Debar Maalo neighborhood and supported by a smaller, organized group known as the "Romantics". While the "Neighbor Derby" is historically significant, recent seasons have seen Vardar dominate the fixture, including a 3–0 victory over Rabotnički in February 2026. The club also maintains a competitive rivalry with FK Shkupi, another Skopje side supported by the "Smugglers" fan group. Matches between the two often carry heightened tension due to the contrasting "Romantics" versus "Smugglers" supporter dynamics.

== Veterans Association ==
The FK Rabotnichki Veterans Association is an organization representing former players, coaches, and officials of FK Rabotnicki. While the group had operated informally since the club's foundation in 1937, it was legally registered as an independent entity on 18 February 2005.

The association functions as a distinct legal body that collaborates closely with the football club. It holds the right to delegate members to the club's governing bodies and provides consultation on club policies and development. The organization's membership includes former sportsmen and prominent public figures, with its leadership historically headed by lawyer Dragan Popovski (President) and Jastrat Janevski (Selector).

The veterans' team regularly competes in friendly matches and international tournaments, most notably the annual Albena Cup held in Albena, Bulgaria.

== Grounds ==
=== Stadium ===
FK Rabotnichki's home venue is the Toše Proeski Arena (formerly known as the Philip II Arena). The stadium has a standard seating capacity of 33,011, making it one of the largest in the Balkans. However, for the 2025–26 season, the capacity was temporarily reduced to approximately 21,418 due to ongoing renovations to meet updated UEFA compliance standards and the addition of new hospitality facilities.

The pitch measures 105 x 68 m and features a state-of-the-art hybrid grass surface, which was installed in March 2024 to allow for year-round play regardless of weather conditions. The stadium is an all-seater ground with 80% of the seats covered. It features two large LED scoreboards on the East and West stands, as well as 494 VIP boxes and 386 media seats located on the North stand. In addition to FK Rabotnichki, the arena serves as the home ground for FK Vardar and the North Macedonia national football team.

=== Training facility ===
The club's training facility is located in the Skopje City Park (Gradski Park), directly opposite the Toše Proeski Arena. The complex includes three renovated football pitches, two of which are equipped with floodlights to facilitate evening training sessions.

The site also houses a support facility originally built in 2007, which contains dressing rooms, a medical room, a gym, a restaurant, and relaxation areas for the players. The location allows the squad to train in close proximity to their official match venue.

== Honours ==
=== Domestic competitions ===
Champions (10)

- Macedonian Republic Football League
  - Winners (6): 1953, 1966, 1968, 1973, 1977, 1980
- Macedonian First League
  - Winners (4): 2004–05, 2005–06, 2007–08, 2013–14
  - Runners-up (3): 2006–07, 2009–10, 2014–15

Cup Winners (10)

- Macedonian Republic Cup
  - Winners (6): 1954, 1957, 1974, 1978, 1983, 1988

- Macedonian Football Cup
  - Winners (4): 2007–08, 2008–09, 2013–14, 2014–15
  - Runners-up (3): 2009–10, 2011–12, 2015–16
- Macedonian Supercup
  - Runners-up (1): 2015

== Recent seasons ==
Season	League									Macedonian Cup	European competitions		
Season	Division	Pos	P	W	D	L	F	A	Pts	Macedonian Cup	UCL	UEL	ECL
1992–93	2. MFL	10th	38	15	9	14	48	47	39	~~N/A.~~	DNQ		
1993–94	2. MFL	12th	26	9	4	13	31	38	22	~~N/A.~~	DNQ		
1994–95	2. MFL	11th	32	11	7	14	47	41	40	~~N/A.~~	DNQ		
1995–96	2. MFL	10th	30	11	10	9	45	33	43	~~N/A.~~	DNQ		
1996–97	2. MFL	11th	29	11	5	13	28	35	38	R1	DNQ		
1997–98	2. MFL	1st↑	30	20	7	3	62	18	67	~~N/A.~~	DNQ		
1998–99	1. MFL	9th	26	9	5	12	38	46	32	QF	DNQ		
1999–2000	1. MFL	3rd	26	16	2	8	41	26	50	SF	DNQ		
2000–01	1. MFL	6th	26	12	3	11	43	36	39	R2	—	QR	—
2001–02	1. MFL	6th	20	6	3	11	30	41	21	R2	DNQ		
2002–03	1. MFL	4th	33	16	6	11	41	35	54	R2	DNQ		
2003–04	1. MFL	4th	33	16	10	7	58	40	58	SF	DNQ		
2004–05	1. MFL	1st	33	25	3	5	66	23	78	QF	DNQ		
2005–06	1. MFL	1st	33	21	9	3	64	26	72	R1	QR2	—	—
2006–07	1. MFL	2nd	33	19	10	4	75	25	67	QF	QR3	R1	—
2007–08	1. MFL	1st	33	24	7	2	51	11	79	W	—	R1	—
2008–09	1. MFL	4th	30	13	8	9	40	25	47	W	QR1	QR1	—
2009–10	1. MFL	2nd	26	15	5	6	38	20	50	RU	—	QR3	—
2010–11	1. MFL	4th	33	15	10	8	53	31	55	R1	—	QR3	—
2011–12	1. MFL	8th	33	11	8	14	49	45	41	RU	—	PO	—
2012–13	1. MFL	4th	33	16	5	12	47	42	53	R1	DNQ		
2013–14	1. MFL	1st	33	18	8	7	66	35	62	W	DNQ		
2014–15	1. MFL	2nd	32	20	6	6	55	30	66	W	QR2	—	—
2015–16	1. MFL	4th	32	10	13	9	36	30	43	RU	—	PO	—
2016–17	1. MFL	3rd	36	14	12	10	49	41	54	R2	—	QR1	—
2017–18	1. MFL	3rd	36	14	10	12	50	43	52	R2	—	QR2	—
2018–19	1. MFL	7th	36	13	7	16	43	49	46	QF	—	QR1	—
2019–20^{1}	1. MFL	8th	23	8	4	11	21	29	28	~~N/A.~~	DNQ		
2020–21	1. MFL	5th	33	11	15	7	45	39	48	R2	DNQ		
2021–22	1. MFL	8th	33	13	4	16	29	35	43	R2	DNQ		
2022–23	1. MFL	8th	30	11	4	15	37	48	37	R2	DNQ		
2023–24	1. MFL	8th	33	12	6	15	29	34	42	QF	DNQ		
2024–25	1. MFL	3rd	33	15	11	7	38	21	56	R1	DNQ		
2025–26	1. MFL	11th↓	33	9	6	18	45	58	33	QF	—	—	QR1

^{1}The 2019–20 season was abandoned due to the COVID-19 pandemic in North Macedonia.

== Rabotnichki in Europe ==
Rabotnichki's first competitive European match was a 0–2 loss against Vorskla Poltava in the 2000–01 UEFA Cup. Krste Velkoski holds the club record for the most European appearances (22) and is the top scorer in UEFA club competitions with 6 goals.

The club's biggest win in UEFA competition came against FC Lusitanos in the 2010–11 Europa League, defeating them 5–0 at home and 6–0 away for an 11–0 aggregate victory. After a multi-year absence from continental football, Rabotnichki returned to Europe for the 2025–26 UEFA Conference League following a third-place finish in the 2024–25 Macedonian First Football League. However, their campaign ended in the first qualifying round with a 0–4 aggregate loss to Belarusian side Torpedo-BelAZ Zhodino.

=== Record by competition ===
As of 26 February 2026

Competition	Pld	W	D	L	GF	GA	GD
UEFA Champions League	14	3	6	5	15	13	+2
UEFA Europa League / UEFA Cup	44	18	8	18	62	58	+4
UEFA Conference League	2	0	0	2	0	4	–4
Total	60	21	14	25	77	75	+2

== Staff ==
=== Coaching staff ===
Position	Name
Head coach	(North Macedonia) Muarem Muarem
Assistant coach	(North Macedonia) Boban Babunski
Goalkeeping coach	(North Macedonia) Matej Milenkov
Physiotherapist	(North Macedonia) Marko Oklevski
Physiotherapist	(North Macedonia) Martin Tashkovski
Doctor	(North Macedonia) Kico Nonkulovski
Fitness coach	(North Macedonia) Marko Jakimovski
Economic	(North Macedonia) Stojan Vuchkov
Economic	(North Macedonia) Vesna Dimchevska
IT	(North Macedonia) Kiril Kolekjeski

=== Club management ===
Position	Name
Chairman	(England) (Turkey) Can Özata
General secretary	(North Macedonia) Nenad Monev

== Notable Managers ==
Based on the historical records of FK Rabotnički, the following managers have led the club to major domestic trophies (Macedonian First Football League and Macedonian Football Cup).

The club's most successful periods occurred under Gjore Jovanovski, who secured the first two league titles; Dragoljub Bekvalac, who won the club's first domestic double; and Igor Angelovski, who won a league title and two national cups.

Notable managers with major trophies
Manager	Nationality	Tenure	Trophies won
Gjore Jovanovski	(North Macedonia)	2003–2007	1. MFL (2): 2004–05, 2005–06
Dragoljub Bekvalac	(Serbia)	2007–2008	1. MFL (1): 2007–08; Macedonian Football Cup (1): 2007–08
Gordan Zdravkov	(North Macedonia)	2009	Macedonian Football Cup (1): 2008–09
Igor Angelovski	(North Macedonia)	2013–2015	1. MFL (1): 2013–14; Macedonian Football Cup (2): 2013–14, 2014–15
