= FK Kumanovo =

Kumanovo
- Full name: Gradski Fudbalski Klub Kumanovo
- Founded: 1924; 102 years ago
- Ground: Stadion Dobroshane
- League: Macedonian Third League (Region 2)
- 2025–26: 3rd
Home colours	Away colours

GFK Kumanovo (Macedonian: ГФК Куманово) is a football club from Kumanovo, North Macedonia. They are currently competing in the Macedonian Third League (Region 2).

== History ==
Kumanovo's old logo

The club was founded in 1924 and in the 1970–71 season won the Republic League. Since the independence, the club was in the Second League until the 1999–00 season when debuted in the top flight. That season was immediately relegated and after one season in the second division won promotion again, this time lasting for two consecutive seasons. Kumanovo has spent a total of 3 seasons in the 1. MFL and has won the 2. MFL on two occasions. In 2003–04 got relegated into the 3. MFL North and in the 2006–07 season quit participating on half-season. After two seasons the club was reactivated in the local fourth divisional group, but only for two seasons. In 2012–13 a new subject called Kumanovo 2006 emerged, but never managed to get past the Fourth League and after 5 seasons seized to exist.

Kumanovo was reactivated in January 2023 as a result of merger of the clubs Studena Voda from nearby Dobroshane, Kumanovo 2012 and a youth academy Eurosport-Vardar to form GFK Kumanovo.

== Technical staff ==
=== Former Chairmans ===
- (North Macedonia) Novica Damjanovski

== Historical list of coaches ==
- (North Macedonia) Nikola Ilievski (1990 - 1991)
- (North Macedonia) Pavle Georgievski
- (North Macedonia) Erkan Jusuf (1999)
- (Serbia) Miroslav Jakovljević (2000)
- (North Macedonia) Vlatko Kostov (2000 - 2002)
- (North Macedonia) Alekso Mackov (2002)
- (North Macedonia) Dragi Kanatlarovski (2002)
- (North Macedonia) Vančo Spasovski (2003)

== Players ==
=== Former players ===
- (Socialist Republic of Macedonia) Pavle Georgievski
- (Socialist Republic of Macedonia) Vujadin Stanojković (1985)
- (Socialist Republic of Macedonia) Gorazd Mihajlov
- (North Macedonia) Boban Nikolovski (1993–1995)
- (North Macedonia) Vlade Lazarevski (2000–2001)
- (North Macedonia) Esad Cholakovikj (2002–2003)

== Honours ==
- (Socialist Republic of Macedonia) Macedonian Republic League:
  - Winners (2): 1948–49, 1970–71
- (North Macedonia) Macedonian Second League:
  - Winners (2): 1998–99, 2000–01
  - Runners-up (2): 1994–95, 1997–98
