= List of football clubs in North Macedonia =

This is a list of football (soccer) clubs in North Macedonia.

== First level ==
Location of teams in the 2025–26 Macedonian First League

There are total of 12 clubs in the top tier of the football in North Macedonia.

Club	City / Town
Arsimi	Čegrane
Bashkimi	Kumanovo
Brera Strumica	Strumica
Makedonija	Gjorče Petrov
Pelister	Bitola
Rabotnichki	Centar, Skopje
Shkëndija	Tetovo
Shkupi	Chair, Skopje
Sileks	Kratovo
Struga	Struga
Tikvesh	Kavadarci
Vardar	Centar, Skopje

== Second level ==
Location of teams in 2025–26 Macedonian Second League

There are a total of 16 clubs in the second tier of the football in North Macedonia.

Club	City / Town
Besa	Dobri Dol
Belasica	Strumica
Bregalnica	Shtip
Detonit Plachkovica	Radovish
Golemo Konjari	Golemo Konjari
Kozhuf	Gevgelija
Novaci	Novaci
Ohrid	Ohrid
Osogovo	Kochani
Pobeda	Valandovo
Sasa	Makedonska Kamenica
Shkëndija Haraçinë	Aračinovo
Skopje	Skopje
Sloga 1934	Vinica
Teteks	Tetovo
Vardar Negotino	Negotino

== Third level ==
There are a total of 62 clubs in five leagues when it comes to the third tier of the football in North Macedonia.

=== North ===
- 1 Aerodrom Skopje
- 2 Akademija Ilinden Skopje
- 3 Bashkimi Ljuboten
- 4 Besa-Vlazrimi Slupchane
- 5 Bratstvo-Vlaznimi Sredno Konjari
- 6 Euromilk Gorno Lisiche
- 7 Fortuna
- 8 Kadino
- 9 Kumanovo
- 10 New Stars Skopje
- 11 Pchinja 2015
- 12 R'zhanichino
- 13 Rinia 98 Dolno Svilare
- 14 KF Shkëndija Haraçinë

=== South ===
- 1 Bashkimi Gorno Jabolchishte
- 2 Buchin
- 3 Drenovo
- 4 Golemo Konjari
- 5 Mladost 1930 Krivogashtani
- 6 Obrshani
- 7 Pitu Guli
- 8 Prevalec
- 9 Rosoman 83
- 10 Sloga 1976 Lazhani
- 11 Ultras Prilep
- 12 Venec
- 13 Vëllazërimi Presillë

=== East ===
- 1 Bregalnica Delchevo
- 2 Dojransko Ezero
- 3 Horizont Turnovo
- 4 Karbinci
- 5 Malesh
- 6 Ovche Pole
- 7 Sloga 1934 Vinica
- 8 Svetlost Zrnovci
- 9 Tiverija
- 10 Udarnik Pirava

=== West ===
- 1 napedok
- 2 Drita 94
- 3 Kamjani
- 4 Ljuboten
- 5 FK uskana/uskana
- 6 Renova
- 7 Reçica
- 8 Teteks
- 9 Vardar Brvenica
- 10 Vëllazërimi J 1977
- 11 Vëllazërimi Sllatinë
- 12 Xhepçishti
- 13 Zajazi

=== Southwest ===
- 1 Demir Hisar
- 2 Evrotip Kravari
- 3 Karaorman
- 4 Korabi
- 5 Kravari
- 6 Prespa
- 7 Sateska
- 8 Slavej Mesheishta
- 9 Sv. Troica Ohrid
- 10 Svetlost Kukurechani
- 11 Veleshta United
- 12 Vllaznimi Struga

== Other active notable clubs ==
- Bashkimi 1947
- Ljuboten
- Milano Kumanovo
- Poeshevo
- Rrufeja
- Slavija

== Defunct ==
- 11 Oktomvri (inactive)
- Aerodrom
- Albarsa
- Alumina (inactive)
- Astibo (inactive)
- Babi (inactive)
- Balkan Skopje
- Bashkimi
- Belo Brdo
- Bregalnica Delchevo
- Butel (inactive)
- Gragjanski Skopje (Makedonija Skopje)
- Ilinden Velmej (inactive)
- Korzo
- Kumanovo (inactive)
- Ljubanci (inactive)
- Lozar
- Jugohrom (inactive)
- Metalurg Skopje (inactive)
- Metalurg Veles
- Miravci (inactive)
- Mladost Carev Dvor (inactive)
- Nov Milenium
- Ohrid Lote
- Pobeda (suspended)
- Pobeda Skopje
- Rabotnik Dzhumajlija (inactive)
- Udarnik Pirava
- Vardarski (inactive)
- Varosh (inactive)
- Shkëndija Arachinovo (inactive)
- Sloga Jugomagnat
- Treska
- Tri Cheshmi
