= 2022–23 Macedonian Third Football League =

Macedonian Third League
- Season: 2022–23

The 2022–23 Macedonian Third Football League was the 31st season of the third-tier football league in North Macedonia, since its establishment. The season began on 4 September 2022 and concluded on 24 May 2023.

== North ==
=== Table ===
Pos	Team	Pld	W	D	L	GF	GA	GD	Pts	Promotion or relegation
1	Bashkimi Kumanovo (C, P)	29	25	1	3	101	22	+79	76	Qualification to Promotion play-offs
2	BVK Konjare	29	20	2	7	83	36	+47	62	
3	Besa-Vlazrimi	29	15	5	9	66	45	+21	50	
4	Kumanovo (Note: Kumanovo was competed under the name Studena Voda in the autumn part of the season.)	29	14	3	12	70	50	+20	45	
5	Fortuna	29	14	2	13	70	58	+12	44	
6	Kadino	29	13	4	12	71	50	+21	43	
7	Euromilk Gorno Lisiche	29	12	6	11	42	45	−3	42	
8	Aerodrom	29	11	7	11	50	40	+10	40	
9	Rinia 98 (Note: Rinia 98 were deducted 3 points for improper registration of several players that lead to not being played the Round 1 match.)	29	12	5	12	56	56	0	38	
10	Petrovec	29	11	4	14	40	52	−12	37	
11	Bashkimi Ljuboten	29	9	9	11	39	35	+4	36	
12	SSK Nova	29	9	8	12	33	65	−32	35	
13	Madjari Solidarnost (R)	29	9	7	13	41	47	−6	34	Withdraw from the league
14	Rashtak (Note: Rashtak was not relegated due to the withdrawal of Butel.)	29	9	4	16	44	77	−33	31	
15	Ilinden Skopje (Note: Ilinden Skopje was not relegated due to the withdrawal of Lokomotiva Skopje.)	29	5	2	22	34	95	−61	17	
16	Volkovo (R)	15	1	3	11	18	84	−66	6	Withdraw from the league

Source: MacedonianFootball.com
Rules for classification: 1) Points; 2) Head-to-head points; 3) Head-to-head goal difference; 4) Head-to-head away goals scored.
(C) Champions; (P) Promoted; (R) Relegated

== South ==
=== Table ===
Pos	Team	Pld	W	D	L	GF	GA	GD	Pts	Promotion or relegation
1	Vardar Negotino (C, P)	21	19	0	2	90	11	+79	57	Qualification to Promotion play-offs
2	Pitu Guli	21	15	2	4	59	29	+30	47	
3	Golemo Konjari	21	14	1	6	56	23	+33	43	
4	Prevalec	21	13	3	5	71	28	+43	42	
5	Sloga 1976	21	10	3	8	46	38	+8	33	
6	Rosoman 83	21	9	4	8	43	40	+3	31	
7	Lokomotiva Gradsko	21	9	3	9	33	39	−6	30	
8	Marena	21	8	0	13	52	56	−4	24	
9	Buchin	21	6	1	14	37	79	−42	19	
10	Mladost 1930	21	3	1	17	21	73	−52	10	
11	Obrshani (Note: Obrshani were deducted 6 points: 3 for not showing up in the Round 4 match and 3 for fielding an ineligible player in Round 17.) (R)	21	5	0	16	20	69	−49	9	Relegation to Macedonian Municipal Leagues
12	Kanatlarci (R)	11	0	2	9	13	56	−43	2	Withdraw from the league

Source: MacedonianFootball.com
Rules for classification: 1) Points; 2) Head-to-head points; 3) Head-to-head goal difference; 4) Head-to-head away goals scored.
(C) Champions; (P) Promoted; (R) Relegated

== East ==
=== Table ===
Pos	Team	Pld	W	D	L	GF	GA	GD	Pts	Promotion or relegation
1	Osogovo (C, P)	21	16	3	2	64	18	+46	51	Qualification to Promotion play-offs
2	Ovche Pole	21	13	5	3	59	33	+26	44	
3	Tiverija	21	10	5	6	43	25	+18	35	
4	Malesh	21	9	4	8	41	36	+5	31	
5	Rudar	21	10	0	11	40	48	−8	30	
6	Dojransko Ezero	21	8	3	10	44	54	−10	27	
7	Vardarski	21	6	6	9	26	50	−24	24	
8	Bregalnica Delchevo (R)	20	6	5	9	30	33	−3	23	Withdraw from the league
9	Karbinci	21	6	5	10	28	37	−9	23	
10	Spartmani (R)	21	7	4	10	32	43	−11	25	Withdraw from the league
11	Akademija Cheshinovo-Obleshevo (R)	20	6	2	12	39	48	−9	20	Withdraw from the league
12	Pobeda Valandovo (R)	11	1	2	8	11	32	−21	5	Withdraw from the league

Source: MacedonianFootball.com
Rules for classification: 1) Points; 2) Head-to-head points; 3) Head-to-head goal difference; 4) Head-to-head away goals scored.
(C) Champions; (P) Promoted; (R) Relegated

== West ==
Note: Vëllazërimi 77 and Proleter Tumchevishte were withdraw before the start of season

=== Table ===
Pos	Team	Pld	W	D	L	GF	GA	GD	Pts	Promotion or relegation
1	Vëllazërimi J 1977 (C)	12	12	0	0	45	5	+40	36	Qualification to Promotion play-offs
2	Zajazi (Note: Zajazi were deducted 3 points for forfeiting from the Macedonian Cup.)	12	9	0	3	24	9	+15	24	
3	Napredok	12	6	0	6	21	25	−4	18	
4	Ljuboten	12	4	0	8	15	21	−6	12	
5	Reçica	12	3	3	6	19	29	−10	12	
6	Drita	12	3	1	8	20	39	−19	10	
7	Kamjani	12	2	2	8	21	37	−16	8	
8	Trabzonspor (R)	0	0	0	0	0	0	0	0	Withdraw from the league

Source: MacedonianFootball.com
Rules for classification: 1) Points; 2) Head-to-head points; 3) Head-to-head goal difference; 4) Head-to-head away goals scored.
(C) Champions; (R) Relegated

== Southwest ==
=== Table ===
Pos	Team	Pld	W	D	L	GF	GA	GD	Pts	Promotion or relegation
1	Novaci (C, P)	19	16	1	2	52	17	+35	49	Qualification to Promotion play-offs
2	Korabi	19	15	0	4	45	19	+26	45	
3	Young Team	19	10	5	4	41	29	+12	35	
4	Demir Hisar	19	10	1	8	41	36	+5	31	
5	Sateska	19	9	2	8	35	41	−6	29	
6	Lirija Grnchari	19	9	1	9	43	34	+9	28	
7	Vlaznimi	19	7	3	9	32	39	−7	24	
8	Prespa	19	8	0	11	30	39	−9	24	
9	Kravari	19	6	4	9	40	35	+5	22	
10	Idnina (R)	19	1	1	17	13	60	−47	4	Withdraw from the league
11	Makedonija Vranishta (R)	10	0	0	10	6	29	−23	0	Withdraw from the league
12	Velmej (R)	0	0	0	0	0	0	0	0	Withdraw from the league

Source: MacedonianFootball.com
Rules for classification: 1) Points; 2) Head-to-head points; 3) Head-to-head goal difference; 4) Head-to-head away goals scored.
(C) Champions; (P) Promoted; (R) Relegated

== See also ==
- 2022–23 Macedonian Football Cup
- 2022–23 Macedonian First Football League
- 2022–23 Macedonian Second Football League
