= 2020–21 Macedonian Third Football League =

Macedonian Third League
- Season: 2020–21

The 2020–21 Macedonian Third Football League was the 29th season of the third-tier football league in North Macedonia, since its establishment.

The season was interrupted on 22 April 2021 due to financial difficulties of many clubs related to a mandatory pre-match COVID-19 test.

== North ==
=== Table ===
Pos	Team	Pld	W	D	L	GF	GA	GD	Pts	Relegation
1	Fortuna (C)	19	17	0	2	74	15	+59	51	
2	Besa-Vlazrimi	20	15	2	3	56	23	+33	47	
3	Studena Voda	20	12	1	7	46	23	+23	37	
4	Nju Stars Skopje	19	11	4	4	42	18	+24	37	
5	Bashkimi Ljuboten	20	11	3	6	41	29	+12	36	
6	Madjari Solidarnost	19	9	5	5	45	30	+15	32	
7	Petrovec	20	9	3	8	31	36	−5	30	
8	Rinia 98	20	8	3	9	28	38	−10	27	
9	Ilinden Skopje	20	8	2	10	38	54	−16	26	
10	Raštak	19	7	3	9	35	37	−2	24	
11	Bashkimi Kumanovo	20	7	2	11	26	32	−6	23	
12	SSK Nova	19	6	3	10	20	46	−26	21	
13	Aerodrom	20	5	3	12	21	38	−17	18	
14	Lokomotiva Skopje (R)	15	4	4	7	23	27	−4	16	Withdraw from the league
15	Volkovo	19	3	2	14	27	52	−25	11	
16	Rechica	19	0	4	15	25	78	−53	4	

Source: MacedonianFootball.com
Rules for classification: 1) Points; 2) Head-to-head points; 3) Head-to-head goal difference; 4) Head-to-head away goals scored.
(C) Champions; (R) Relegated

== South ==
=== Table ===
Pos	Team	Pld	W	D	L	GF	GA	GD	Pts	Promotion or relegation
1	Lokomotiva Gradsko (C, P)	21	16	3	2	63	13	+50	51	Promotion to Macedonian Second League
2	Bratstvo 07 (P)	22	13	5	4	52	24	+28	44	Promotion to Macedonian Second League
3	Novo Crnilishte	21	14	1	6	64	33	+31	43	
4	Vardar Negotino	21	11	5	5	51	25	+26	38	
5	Napredok Krusheani	20	12	2	6	50	26	+24	38	
6	Prevalec	21	11	1	9	57	30	+27	34	
7	Obrshani	22	8	5	9	35	37	−2	29	
8	Dinamo Mazhuchishte	21	7	2	12	43	73	−30	23	
9	Mladost 1930	21	6	4	11	23	50	−27	22	
10	Marena	21	6	4	11	34	64	−30	22	
11	Pitu Guli	20	6	2	12	31	43	−12	20	
12	Golemo Konjari	22	6	2	14	31	65	−34	20	
13	Mladost Udovo	20	5	4	11	30	56	−26	19	
14	Dojransko Ezero (Note: Dojransko Ezero were deducted 15 points.)	21	9	4	8	49	39	+10	16	
15	Ilinden BS (Note: Ilinden BS were deducted 3 points.) (R)	14	1	2	11	13	48	−35	2	Withdraw from the league
–	Gaber (R)	5	0	0	5	3	24	−21	0	Withdraw from the league

Source: MacedonianFootball.com
Rules for classification: 1) Points; 2) Head-to-head points; 3) Head-to-head goal difference; 4) Head-to-head away goals scored.
(C) Champions; (P) Promoted; (R) Relegated

== East ==
=== Table ===
Pos	Team	Pld	W	D	L	GF	GA	GD	Pts	Promotion
1	Detonit Junior (C, P)	16	13	2	1	47	9	+38	41	Promotion to Macedonian Second League
2	Horizont Turnovo	16	12	1	3	46	13	+33	37	
3	Bregalnica Golak	16	11	2	3	39	20	+19	35	
4	Ovche Pole	16	11	1	4	40	16	+24	34	
5	Malesh	16	9	1	6	44	22	+22	28	
6	Cheshinovo	16	7	3	6	36	21	+15	24	
7	Tiverija	16	5	1	10	34	44	−10	16	
8	Karbinci	16	4	4	8	16	31	−15	16	
9	Spartmani	16	5	1	10	15	48	−33	16	
10	Raklish	16	4	3	9	22	43	−21	15	
11	Rabotnik	16	3	1	12	19	45	−26	10	
12	Vasilevo	16	1	2	13	19	65	−46	5	

Source: MacedonianFootball.com
Rules for classification: 1) Points; 2) Head-to-head points; 3) Head-to-head goal difference; 4) Head-to-head away goals scored.
(C) Champions; (P) Promoted

== West ==
=== Table ===
Pos	Team	Pld	W	D	L	GF	GA	GD	Pts	Promotion
1	Besa (C, P)	14	13	1	0	46	7	+39	40	Promotion to Macedonian Second League
2	Arsimi	14	11	1	2	55	16	+39	34	
3	Reçica	13	7	5	1	28	17	+11	26	
4	Vrapchishte	14	8	2	4	24	13	+11	26	
5	Zajazi	14	6	4	4	23	16	+7	22	
6	Kamjani	13	6	3	4	39	28	+11	21	
7	Ljuboten	13	5	0	8	20	36	−16	15	
8	Trabzonspor	13	3	2	8	17	33	−16	11	
9	Nerashti	14	3	1	10	14	28	−14	10	
10	Napredok Kichevo	14	1	4	9	15	31	−16	7	
11	Proleter	14	0	1	13	10	66	−56	1	

Source: MacedonianFootball.com
Rules for classification: 1) Points; 2) Head-to-head points; 3) Head-to-head goal difference; 4) Head-to-head away goals scored.
(C) Champions; (P) Promoted

== Southwest ==
=== Table ===
Pos	Team	Pld	W	D	L	GF	GA	GD	Pts	Promotion or relegation
1	Voska Sport (C, P)	20	18	2	0	69	25	+44	56	Promotion to Macedonian Second League
2	Karaorman	19	13	4	2	46	13	+33	43	
3	Novaci 2005	19	11	4	4	46	23	+23	37	
4	Crno Buki ZL	20	11	1	8	45	24	+21	34	
5	Vllaznimi	20	10	2	8	54	46	+8	32	
6	Kravari	19	10	2	7	43	35	+8	32	
7	Prespa	19	10	1	8	41	26	+15	31	
8	Sateska	20	10	0	10	36	38	−2	30	
9	Makedonija Vranishta	20	7	6	7	30	31	−1	27	
10	Oktisi Sport	20	7	6	7	34	39	−5	27	
11	Lirija Grnchari	20	6	5	9	38	31	+7	23	
12	Iskra	20	7	2	11	28	53	−25	23	
13	Belica	20	4	5	11	40	56	−16	17	
14	Pobeda Ivanjevci	19	4	1	14	26	64	−38	13	
15	Flamurtari Radolishta (R)	15	3	1	11	15	33	−18	10	Withdraw from the league
16	Strela Sport	20	2	2	16	24	78	−54	8	

Source: MacedonianFootball.com
Rules for classification: 1) Points; 2) Head-to-head points; 3) Head-to-head goal difference; 4) Head-to-head away goals scored.
(C) Champions; (P) Promoted; (R) Relegated

== See also ==
- 2020–21 Macedonian Football Cup
- 2020–21 Macedonian First Football League
- 2020–21 Macedonian Second Football League
