= 2019–20 Macedonian Third Football League =

Macedonian Third League
- Season: 2019–20

The 2019–20 Macedonian Third Football League was the 28th season of the third-tier football league in North Macedonia, since its establishment.

The season was interrupted on 12 March 2020 due to COVID-19 pandemic in North Macedonia, and was not continued. Veleshta, Rosoman 83 and Sloga 1934 were promoted to the Second League by the draw.

== North ==
=== Table ===
Pos	Team	Pld	W	D	L	GF	GA	GD	Pts	Relegation
1	Fortuna (C)	13	12	1	0	51	17	+34	37	
2	Madjari Solidarnost	13	9	2	2	32	11	+21	29	
3	Studena Voda	13	9	1	3	44	18	+26	28	
4	Lokomotiva Skopje	13	8	2	3	27	17	+10	26	
5	Bratstvo-Vlaznimi (R)	13	7	2	4	32	19	+13	23	Withdraw from the league
6	Rinia 98	13	5	6	2	22	16	+6	21	
7	Besa-Vlazrimi	13	6	1	6	38	35	+3	19	
8	Ilinden Skopje	13	5	2	6	21	23	−2	17	
9	SSK Nova	13	4	3	6	28	27	+1	15	
10	Volkovo	13	4	3	6	25	33	−8	15	
11	Rechica	13	2	4	7	21	34	−13	10	
12	Nju Jork Skopje	13	2	1	10	13	31	−18	7	
13	Petrovec (Note: Petrovec were deducted 3 points.)	13	2	2	9	19	51	−32	5	
14	Cementarnica 55 (Note: Cementarnica 55 were deducted 3 points due to the incident in the 7th round match. Later Cementarnica 55 was withdraw from the competition.) (R)	13	0	2	11	7	48	−41	−1	Withdraw from the league

Source: MacedonianFootball.com
Rules for classification: 1) Points; 2) Head-to-head points; 3) Head-to-head goal difference; 4) Head-to-head away goals scored.
(C) Champions; (R) Relegated

== Center ==
=== Table ===
Pos	Team	Pld	W	D	L	GF	GA	GD	Pts	Promotion
1	Rosoman 83 (C, P)	14	11	1	2	36	9	+27	34	Promotion to Macedonian Second League
2	Prevalec	14	11	1	2	38	20	+18	34	
3	Napredok Krusheani	14	10	3	1	43	26	+17	33	
4	Obrshani	14	7	2	5	28	18	+10	23	
5	Vardar Negotino (Note: Vardar Negotino were deducted 3 points.)	14	8	1	5	42	23	+19	22	
6	Novo Crnilishte	14	7	0	7	52	40	+12	21	
7	Mladost 1930	14	6	2	6	24	26	−2	20	
8	Dinamo Mazhuchishte	14	5	2	7	21	36	−15	17	
9	Marena	14	5	1	8	35	30	+5	16	
10	Golemo Konjari	14	4	1	9	15	26	−11	13	
11	Bratstvo 07	14	2	6	6	17	27	−10	12	
12	Ilinden BS	14	3	3	8	22	36	−14	12	
13	Gaber	14	3	1	10	15	47	−32	10	
14	Lokomotiva Gradsko	14	2	3	9	12	39	−27	9	

Source: MacedonianFootball.com
Rules for classification: 1) Points; 2) Head-to-head points; 3) Head-to-head goal difference; 4) Head-to-head away goals scored.
(C) Champions; (P) Promoted

== Southeast ==
=== Table ===
Pos	Team	Pld	W	D	L	GF	GA	GD	Pts	Promotion
1	Sloga 1934 (C, P)	10	10	0	0	36	0	+36	30	Promotion to Macedonian Second League
2	Ovche Pole	10	9	0	1	29	6	+23	27	
3	Detonit Junior	10	6	1	3	25	15	+10	19	
4	Vasilevo	10	5	2	3	18	11	+7	17	
5	Tiverija	10	5	1	4	29	24	+5	16	
6	Bregalnica Golak	10	5	0	5	22	20	+2	15	
7	Raklish	10	4	0	6	21	26	−5	12	
8	Dojransko Ezero	10	4	0	6	19	25	−6	12	
9	Mladost Udovo	10	2	0	8	14	35	−21	6	
10	Malesh	10	2	0	8	16	39	−23	6	
11	Spartmani	10	1	0	9	5	33	−28	3	

Source: MacedonianFootball.com
Rules for classification: 1) Points; 2) Head-to-head points; 3) Head-to-head goal difference; 4) Head-to-head away goals scored.
(C) Champions; (P) Promoted

== West ==
=== Table ===
Pos	Team	Pld	W	D	L	GF	GA	GD	Pts	Promotion
1	Besa (C)	11	10	0	1	32	4	+28	30	
2	Teteks (P)	11	8	2	1	32	6	+26	26	Promotion to Macedonian Second League (Note: Teteks was promoted to Second League due to the merger with Labunishta.)
3	Zajazi	11	8	1	2	26	17	+9	25	
4	Kamjani	11	6	2	3	27	17	+10	20	
5	Proleter	11	6	1	4	19	21	−2	19	
6	Reçica	11	5	2	4	13	13	0	17	
7	Trabzonspor	11	5	0	6	17	18	−1	15	
8	Napredok Kichevo	11	4	2	5	18	21	−3	14	
9	Arsimi	11	4	0	7	17	22	−5	12	
10	Ljuboten	11	3	1	7	14	20	−6	10	
11	Nerashti	11	1	1	9	5	28	−23	4	
12	Flamurtari Debreshe	11	0	0	11	3	36	−33	0	

Source: MacedonianFootball.com
Rules for classification: 1) Points; 2) Head-to-head points; 3) Head-to-head goal difference; 4) Head-to-head away goals scored.
(C) Champions; (P) Promoted

== Southwest ==
=== Table ===
Pos	Team	Pld	W	D	L	GF	GA	GD	Pts	Promotion
1	Veleshta (C, P)	15	11	1	3	48	15	+33	34	Promotion to Macedonian Second League
2	Crno Buki ZL	15	9	2	4	34	19	+15	29	
3	Flamurtari Radolishta	15	8	4	3	29	14	+15	28	
4	Novaci 2005	15	7	3	5	37	22	+15	24	
5	Prespa	15	7	2	6	36	23	+13	23	
6	Vlaznimi	15	7	2	6	30	23	+7	23	
7	Oktisi Sport	15	7	1	7	26	46	−20	22	
8	Lirija Grnchari	15	6	3	6	33	24	+9	21	
9	Kravari	15	6	3	6	28	29	−1	21	
10	Karaorman	15	6	2	7	30	30	0	20	
11	Sateska	15	5	3	7	21	32	−11	18	
12	Debrca	15	5	2	8	26	39	−13	17	
13	Makedonija Vranishta	14	3	4	7	13	32	−19	13	
14	Strela Sport	15	1	2	12	15	58	−43	5	

Source: MacedonianFootball.com
Rules for classification: 1) Points; 2) Head-to-head points; 3) Head-to-head goal difference; 4) Head-to-head away goals scored.
(C) Champions; (P) Promoted

== See also ==
- 2019–20 Macedonian Football Cup
- 2019–20 Macedonian First Football League
- 2019–20 Macedonian Second Football League
