= 2023–24 Macedonian Third Football League =

Macedonian Third League
- Season: 2023–24

The 2023–24 Macedonian Third Football League was the 32nd season of the third-tier football league in North Macedonia, since its establishment. The season began on 16 September 2023 and concluded on 19 May 2024.

== North ==
=== Table ===
Pos	Team	Pld	W	D	L	GF	GA	GD	Pts	Promotion or relegation
1	Kumanovo (C)	26	23	1	2	76	16	+60	70	Qualification to Promotion play-offs
2	Shkendija 77	26	23	0	3	105	24	+81	69	
3	Euromilk Gorno Lisiche	26	17	5	4	74	25	+49	56	
4	Fortuna	26	14	4	8	78	43	+35	46	
5	BVK Konjare (Note: BVK Konjare were deducted 3 points for not appearing in Round 20 match.)	26	14	3	9	64	39	+25	42	
6	Besa-Vlazrimi	26	11	3	12	51	47	+4	36	
7	Ilinden Skopje	26	9	6	11	55	61	−6	33	
8	Aerodrom	26	8	8	10	39	38	+1	32	
9	Kadino	26	9	5	12	49	76	−27	32	
10	Rinia 98	26	9	4	13	64	68	−4	31	
11	Bashkimi Ljuboten	26	8	6	12	35	42	−7	30	
12	Rashtak (R)	26	7	3	16	48	95	−47	24	Relegation to Macedonian Municipal Leagues
13	Petrovec (Note: Petrovec were deducted 3 points for not appearing in Round 6 match.) (R)	26	4	3	19	28	83	−55	12	Relegation to Macedonian Municipal Leagues
14	SSK Nova (R)	26	0	1	25	20	129	−109	1	Relegation to Macedonian Municipal Leagues

Source: FFM.mk, MacedonianFootball.com
Rules for classification: 1) Points; 2) Head-to-head points; 3) Head-to-head goal difference; 4) Head-to-head away goals scored.
(C) Champions; (R) Relegated

== South ==
=== Table ===
Pos	Team	Pld	W	D	L	GF	GA	GD	Pts	Promotion or relegation
1	Borec (C, P)	20	16	3	1	72	13	+59	51	Qualification to Promotion play-offs
2	Prevalec	20	13	3	4	63	27	+36	42	
3	Rosoman 83	20	12	4	4	55	26	+29	40	
4	Golemo Konjari	20	11	4	5	54	32	+22	37	
5	Pitu Guli	20	9	3	8	45	26	+19	30	
6	Sloga 1976	20	8	4	8	41	39	+2	28	
7	Mladost 1930	20	8	4	8	42	52	−10	28	
8	Ultras Prilep	20	5	2	13	40	83	−43	17	
9	Marena (Note: Marena were deducted 3 points for not appearing in the Round 17 match.)	20	5	3	12	26	44	−18	15	
10	Buchin	20	4	1	15	35	83	−48	13	
11	Lokomotiva Gradsko (R)	20	3	1	16	21	69	−48	10	Relegation to Macedonian Municipal Leagues

Source: FFM.mk, MacedonianFootball.com
Rules for classification: 1) Points; 2) Head-to-head points; 3) Head-to-head goal difference; 4) Head-to-head away goals scored.
(C) Champions; (P) Promoted; (R) Relegated

== East ==
=== Table ===
Pos	Team	Pld	W	D	L	GF	GA	GD	Pts	Promotion or relegation
1	Vardarski (C, P)	16	11	4	1	40	19	+21	37	Qualification to Promotion play-offs
2	Sloga 1934	16	11	2	3	46	11	+35	35	
3	Tiverija	16	8	2	6	30	29	+1	26	
4	Dojransko Ezero	16	7	4	5	26	26	0	25	
5	Ovche Pole	16	7	3	6	35	37	−2	24	
6	Udarnik	16	4	4	8	26	30	−4	16	
7	Rudar	16	5	4	7	23	28	−5	19	
8	Malesh	16	3	2	11	22	47	−25	11	
9	Karbinci	16	2	3	11	20	41	−21	9	

Source: FFM.mk, MacedonianFootball.com
Rules for classification: 1) Points; 2) Head-to-head points; 3) Head-to-head goal difference; 4) Head-to-head away goals scored.
(C) Champions; (P) Promoted

== West ==
=== Table ===
Pos	Team	Pld	W	D	L	GF	GA	GD	Pts	Promotion or relegation
1	Vëllazërimi J 1977 (C)	21	19	2	0	66	8	+58	59	Qualification to Promotion play-offs
2	Xhepçishti	21	15	1	5	50	32	+18	46	
3	Drita 94	21	8	7	6	43	34	+9	31	
4	Ljuboten	21	7	2	12	37	47	−10	23	
5	Zajazi	21	6	5	10	39	50	−11	23	
6	Reçica	21	6	5	10	28	45	−17	23	
7	Napredok	21	6	0	15	32	55	−23	18	
8	Kamjani	21	5	2	14	40	64	−24	17	

Source: FFM.mk, MacedonianFootball.com
Rules for classification: 1) Points; 2) Head-to-head points; 3) Head-to-head goal difference; 4) Head-to-head away goals scored.
(C) Champions

== Southwest ==
=== Table ===
Pos	Team	Pld	W	D	L	GF	GA	GD	Pts	Promotion or relegation
1	Korabi (C)	15	13	1	1	55	14	+41	40	Qualification to Promotion play-offs
2	Lirija Grnchari	15	9	2	4	28	14	+14	29	
3	Kravari	15	8	1	6	41	23	+18	25	
4	Demir Hisar	15	7	3	5	38	28	+10	24	
5	Prespa	15	5	2	8	21	29	−8	17	
6	Sateska (Note: Sateska were deducted 3 points for not appearing in the Round 1 match.)	15	5	1	9	34	53	−19	13	
7	Vlaznimi	15	3	3	9	15	28	−13	12	
8	Svetlost	15	3	3	9	17	51	−34	12	
9	Young Team (R)	8	3	0	5	14	23	−9	9	Withdraw from the league

Source: FFM.mk, MacedonianFootball.com
Rules for classification: 1) Points; 2) Head-to-head points; 3) Head-to-head goal difference; 4) Head-to-head away goals scored.
(C) Champions; (R) Relegated

== See also ==
- 2023–24 Macedonian Football Cup
- 2023–24 Macedonian First Football League
- 2023–24 Macedonian Second Football League
