= 2024–25 Macedonian Third Football League =

Macedonian Third League
- Season: 2024–25

The 2024–25 Macedonian Third Football League was the 33rd season of the third-tier football league in North Macedonia, since its establishment. The season began on 8 September 2024 and concluded on 18 May 2025.

== North ==
=== Table ===
Pos	Team	Pld	W	D	L	GF	GA	GD	Pts	Promotion or relegation
1	Shkëndija 77 (C, P)	26	23	1	2	111	9	+102	70	Qualification to Promotion play-offs
2	Fortuna	26	14	3	9	62	43	+19	45	
3	Euromilk	26	13	3	10	67	51	+16	42	
4	Kumanovo	26	12	5	9	60	47	+13	41	
5	R'zhanichino	26	11	5	10	47	64	−17	38	
6	BVK Konjare	26	10	7	9	60	56	+4	37	
7	Aerodrom (Note: New Stars were deducted 3 points for leaving the pitch in Round 16 match.)	26	12	2	12	52	56	−4	35	
8	Besa	26	11	2	13	65	77	−12	35	
9	Pchinja	26	10	4	12	39	39	0	34	
10	Kadino	26	10	3	13	46	62	−16	33	
11	Bashkimi (Lj)	26	8	8	10	46	56	−10	32	
12	Rinia 98 (R)	26	7	3	16	45	79	−34	24	Relegation to Macedonian Municipal Leagues
13	New Stars (Note: Aerodrom were deducted 3 points for fielded an ineligible goalkeeper in Round 21 match.) (R)	26	7	5	14	40	52	−12	23	Relegation to Macedonian Municipal Leagues
14	Akademija Ilinden (Note: Akademija Ilinden were deducted 6 points for not playing the Round 24 and 25 matches.) (R)	26	7	3	16	25	74	−49	18	Relegation to Macedonian Municipal Leagues

Source: FFM.mk, MacedonianFootball.com
Rules for classification: 1) Points; 2) Head-to-head points; 3) Head-to-head goal difference; 4) Head-to-head away goals scored.
(C) Champions; (P) Promoted; (R) Relegated

== South ==
=== Table ===
Pos	Team	Pld	W	D	L	GF	GA	GD	Pts	Promotion or relegation
1	Golemo Konjari (C, P)	23	18	3	2	75	10	+65	57	Qualification to Promotion play-offs
2	Prevalec	23	15	5	3	67	26	+41	50	
3	Bashkimi (GJ)	23	13	6	4	44	25	+19	45	
4	Mladost 1930	23	13	3	7	52	27	+25	42	
5	Venec	23	11	5	7	45	34	+11	38	
6	Rosoman 83	23	12	2	9	44	46	−2	38	
7	Ultras	23	9	5	9	56	61	−5	32	
8	Buchin	23	6	7	10	29	47	−18	25	
9	Pitu Guli	23	5	8	10	25	28	−3	23	
10	Sloga 1976	23	4	5	14	40	67	−27	17	
11	Drenovo (Note: Drenovo and Vëllazërimi (P) were deducted 3 points each for interrupting the Round 13 matches.)	23	4	6	13	33	65	−32	15	
12	Vëllazërimi (P)	23	4	3	16	36	79	−43	12	
13	Obrshani (R)	12	1	0	11	8	39	−31	3	Withdraw from the league

Source: FFM.mk, MacedonianFootball.com
Rules for classification: 1) Points; 2) Head-to-head points; 3) Head-to-head goal difference; 4) Head-to-head away goals scored.
(C) Champions; (P) Promoted; (R) Relegated

== East ==
=== Table ===
Pos	Team	Pld	W	D	L	GF	GA	GD	Pts	Promotion
1	Sloga 1934 (C, P)	18	17	0	1	99	8	+91	51	Qualification to Promotion play-offs
2	Bregalnica 1926	18	8	6	4	22	17	+5	30	
3	Horizont Turnovo	18	7	5	6	24	40	−16	26	
4	Ovche Pole	18	7	4	7	28	21	+7	25	
5	Karbinci	18	6	6	6	27	26	+1	24	
6	Dojransko Ezero	18	6	6	6	26	30	−4	24	
7	Svetlost (Z)	18	6	3	9	23	33	−10	21	
8	Malesh	18	5	6	7	16	32	−16	21	
9	Udarnik	18	4	2	12	23	54	−31	14	
10	Tiverija	18	3	4	11	26	53	−27	13	

Source: MacedonianFootball.com
Rules for classification: 1) Points; 2) Head-to-head points; 3) Head-to-head goal difference; 4) Head-to-head away goals scored.
(C) Champions; (P) Promoted

== West ==
=== Table ===
Pos	Team	Pld	W	D	L	GF	GA	GD	Pts	Promotion or relegation
1	Teteks (C, P)	24	21	2	1	85	18	+67	65	Qualification to Promotion play-offs
2	Vëllazërimi J 1977	24	15	1	8	64	37	+27	46	
3	Djepchishte	24	13	1	10	69	57	+12	40	
4	Kamjani	24	12	1	11	59	56	+3	37	
5	Drita 94	24	11	2	11	50	50	0	35	
6	Reçica	24	11	0	13	36	42	−6	33	
7	Zajazi	24	10	1	13	55	62	−7	31	
8	Ljuboten	24	9	3	12	39	52	−13	30	
9	Renova	24	9	2	13	61	67	−6	29	
10	Napredok	24	9	2	13	38	56	−18	29	
11	Dobroshti	24	9	2	13	51	70	−19	29	
12	Vardar (B)	24	8	3	13	36	58	−22	27	
13	Vëllazërimi (S) (R)	24	8	2	14	41	59	−18	26	Relegation to Macedonian Municipal Leagues

Source: FFM.mk, MacedonianFootball.com
Rules for classification: 1) Points; 2) Head-to-head points; 3) Head-to-head goal difference; 4) Head-to-head away goals scored.
(C) Champions; (P) Promoted; (R) Relegated

== Southwest ==
=== Table ===
Pos	Team	Pld	W	D	L	GF	GA	GD	Pts	Promotion or relegation
1	Prespa (C)	21	15	4	2	49	16	+33	49	Qualification to Promotion play-offs
2	Evrotip	21	11	5	5	43	24	+19	38	
3	Sateska (Note: Sateska were deducted 3 points for not playing the Round 16 match.)	21	11	5	5	60	48	+12	35	
4	Korabi	21	11	2	8	40	41	−1	35	
5	Kravari	21	10	4	7	47	24	+23	34	
6	Karaorman (Note: Karaorman were deducted 3 points for not playing the Round 19 match.)	21	10	1	10	35	42	−7	28	
7	Slavej	21	8	3	10	29	38	−9	27	
8	Vllaznimi	21	7	2	12	36	43	−7	23	
9	Sv. Troica	21	5	7	9	31	34	−3	22	
10	Veleshta United (Note: Veleshta United were deducted 3 points for not playing the Round 12 match.)	21	7	3	11	43	64	−21	21	
11	Demir Hisar	21	5	4	12	32	41	−9	19	
12	Svetlost (K) (R)	11	1	0	10	11	41	−30	3	Withdraw from the league

Source: FFM.mk, MacedonianFootball.com
Rules for classification: 1) Points; 2) Head-to-head points; 3) Head-to-head goal difference; 4) Head-to-head away goals scored.
(C) Champions; (R) Relegated

== See also ==
- 2024–25 Macedonian Football Cup
- 2024–25 Macedonian First Football League
- 2024–25 Macedonian Second Football League
