= 2021–22 Macedonian Third Football League =

Macedonian Third League
- Season: 2021–22

The 2021–22 Macedonian Third Football League was the 30th season of the third-tier football league in North Macedonia, since its establishment.

The season in the north group was cancelled due to the COVID-19-rules disagreements between the clubs and the league.

== South ==
Note: Napredok Krusheani were withdraw before the start of season

=== Table ===
Pos	Team	Pld	W	D	L	GF	GA	GD	Pts	Promotion or relegation
1	Vardar Negotino (C)	24	21	2	1	107	21	+86	65	Qualification to Promotion play-offs
2	Prevalec	24	19	3	2	100	34	+66	60	
3	Rosoman 83	24	15	4	5	62	34	+28	49	
4	Pitu Guli	24	15	4	5	52	28	+24	49	
5	Novo Crnilishte	24	11	5	8	65	58	+7	38	
6	Marena	24	11	2	11	57	52	+5	35	
7	Golemo Konjari	24	9	6	9	38	42	−4	33	
8	Sloga 1976	24	9	2	13	36	55	−19	29	
9	Dinamo Mazhuchishte	24	8	1	15	44	78	−34	25	
10	Mladost 1930	24	7	2	15	43	62	−19	23	
11	Buchin	24	6	3	15	47	72	−25	21	
12	Obrshani (Note: Obrshani were deducted 3 points for not appearing in Round 25.)	24	4	4	16	31	72	−41	13	
13	Vozarci (R)	24	2	0	22	24	98	−74	6	Relegation to Macedonian Municipal Leagues

Source: MacedonianFootball.com
Rules for classification: 1) Points; 2) Head-to-head points; 3) Head-to-head goal difference; 4) Head-to-head away goals scored.
(C) Champions; (R) Relegated

== East ==
=== Table ===
Pos	Team	Pld	W	D	L	GF	GA	GD	Pts	Promotion
1	Ovche Pole (C)	10	8	2	0	34	9	+25	26	Qualification to Promotion play-offs
2	Rudar	10	5	2	3	18	12	+6	17	
3	Dojransko Ezero	10	5	0	5	14	24	−10	15	
4	Karbinci	10	3	2	5	9	20	−11	11	
5	Malesh	10	2	3	5	9	12	−3	9	
6	Cheshinovo	10	2	1	7	14	21	−7	7	

Source: MacedonianFootball.com
Rules for classification: 1) Points; 2) Head-to-head points; 3) Head-to-head goal difference; 4) Head-to-head away goals scored.
(C) Champions

== West ==
=== Table ===
Pos	Team	Pld	W	D	L	GF	GA	GD	Pts	Promotion or relegation
1	Arsimi (C, P)	21	19	2	0	87	20	+67	59	Qualification to Promotion play-offs
2	Zajazi	21	15	1	5	54	24	+30	46	
3	Reçica	21	12	4	5	47	27	+20	40	
4	Vëllazërimi 77	21	11	1	9	56	38	+18	34	
5	Vrapchishte	21	10	3	8	44	32	+12	33	
6	Napredok	21	9	3	9	40	33	+7	30	
7	Kamjani	21	8	4	9	45	56	−11	28	
8	Drita	21	8	1	12	38	52	−14	25	
9	Ljuboten	21	7	3	11	33	46	−13	24	
10	Proleter Tumchevishte	21	4	2	15	32	92	−60	14	
11	Trabzonspor	21	2	4	15	27	66	−39	10	
12	Nerashti (R)	11	2	0	9	12	29	−17	6	Withdraw from the league

Source: MacedonianFootball.com
Rules for classification: 1) Points; 2) Head-to-head points; 3) Head-to-head goal difference; 4) Head-to-head away goals scored.
(C) Champions; (P) Promoted; (R) Relegated

== Southwest ==
=== Table ===
Pos	Team	Pld	W	D	L	GF	GA	GD	Pts	Promotion or relegation
1	Karaorman (C, P)	22	20	1	1	77	21	+56	61	Qualification to Promotion play-offs
2	Crno Buki ZL	22	12	4	6	56	28	+28	40	
3	Prespa	22	11	2	9	53	42	+11	35	
4	Novaci	22	9	7	6	45	28	+17	34	
5	Vlaznimi	22	10	2	10	39	38	+1	32	
6	Lirija Grnchari	22	9	4	9	49	40	+9	31	
7	Makedonija Vranishta	22	9	4	9	39	39	0	31	
8	Sateska	22	8	6	8	44	48	−4	30	
9	Demir Hisar	22	7	7	8	46	47	−1	28	
10	Kravari	22	6	7	9	33	48	−15	25	
11	Oktisi (R)	12	3	3	6	15	29	−14	12	Withdraw from the league
12	Pobeda Ivanjevci	22	3	1	18	21	85	−64	10	
13	Strela (R)	12	1	2	9	10	34	−24	5	Withdraw from the league

Source: MacedonianFootball.com
Rules for classification: 1) Points; 2) Head-to-head points; 3) Head-to-head goal difference; 4) Head-to-head away goals scored.
(C) Champions; (P) Promoted; (R) Relegated

== Promotion play-offs ==
22 June 2022

Arsimi	4–1	Ovche Pole
Elmazi 53'; Xhemaili 60', 82'; Ajruli 64'	Report	Nacev 12'

Gjorche Petrov Stadium, Skopje
Referee: Jovan Kachevski (Struga)
22 June 2022

Vardar Negotino	0–0	Karaorman
	Report
Penalties
	4–5

Boris Trajkovski Stadium, Skopje
Referee: Dimitar Pileshkov (Shtip)

== See also ==
- 2021–22 Macedonian Football Cup
- 2021–22 Macedonian First Football League
- 2021–22 Macedonian Second Football League
