= 2023–24 Macedonian Second Football League =

Macedonian Second League
- Season: 2023–24
- Champions: Besa
- Promoted: Besa; Pelister
- Relegated: Karaorman; Teteks
- Matches: 240
- Goals: 614 (2.56 per match)

The 2023–24 Macedonian Second Football League was the 32nd season of the Macedonian Second Football League, the second division in the Macedonian football league system. This was the second season since the league was returned to the united league format, for the first time since 2016–17 season. The season began on 12 August 2023.

The winners (Besa) and runners-up (Pelister) were promoted to the 2024–25 Macedonian First Football League. The third-placed team (Detonit Plachkovica) qualified for the Macedonian First Football League play-off. The fourteenth-placed team (Pobeda) qualified for the Macedonian Second Football League play-off. The bottom two teams (Teteks and Karaorman) were relegated to the 2024–25 Macedonian Third Football League.

== Participating teams ==
Location of teams in 2023–24 Macedonian Second League

Club	City	Stadium	Capacity
Arsimi	Chegrane	Stadion Chegrane	
Bashkimi	Kumanovo	KF Bashkimi Stadium	3,500
Belasica	Strumica	Stadion Blagoj Istatov	6,500
Besa	Dobri Dol	Global Arena	4,000
Detonit Plachkovica	Radovish	Gradski stadion Radovish	2,000
Karaorman	Struga	Stadion Gradska Plaža	2,500
Kozhuf	Gevgelija	Gradski stadion Gevgelija	1,400
Novaci	Novaci	Stadion Novaci	500
Ohrid	Ohrid	SRC Biljanini Izvori	3,000
Osogovo	Kochani	Stadion Nikola Mantov	5,000
Pelister	Bitola	Stadion Petar Miloševski	9,100
Pobeda	Prilep	Stadion Goce Delchev	15,000
Sasa	Makedonska Kamenica	Gradski stadion M. Kamenica	5,000
Skopje	Skopje	Stadion Zhelezarnica	3,000
Teteks	Tetovo	AMS Sportski Centar Tetovo	2,000
Vardar Negotino	Negotino	Cvaj Arena	1,500

== League table ==
Pos	Team	Pld	W	D	L	GF	GA	GD	Pts	Promotion, qualification or relegation
1	Besa (C, P)	30	24	5	1	72	11	+61	77	Promotion to the Macedonian First League
2	Pelister (P)	30	22	4	4	57	17	+40	70	Promotion to the Macedonian First League
3	Detonit Plachkovica	30	18	6	6	42	18	+24	60	Qualification for the Macedonian First Football League play-off
4	Arsimi	30	15	6	9	54	32	+22	51	
5	Ohrid	30	13	6	11	35	32	+3	45	
6	Vardar Negotino	30	12	6	12	35	35	0	42 (Note: Head-to-head points: Vardar Negotino 10, Belasica 5, Bashkimi 2.)	
7	Belasica	30	11	9	10	39	32	+7	42	
8	Bashkimi	30	12	6	12	29	40	−11	42	
9	Skopje	30	11	8	11	29	30	−1	41	
10	Kozhuf	30	11	5	14	33	36	−3	38	
11	Novaci	30	10	4	16	39	49	−10	34	
12	Osogovo	30	8	6	16	34	54	−20	30	
13	Sasa	30	7	8	15	37	52	−15	29	
14	Pobeda (O)	30	6	10	14	28	45	−17	28	Qualification for the Macedonian Second Football League play-off
15	Teteks (R)	30	7	6	17	32	60	−28	27	Relegation to the Macedonian Third League
16	Karaorman (R)	30	4	3	23	19	71	−52	15	Relegation to the Macedonian Third League

Source: MacedonianFootball.com
Rules for classification: 1) Points; 2) Head-to-head points; 3) Head-to-head goal difference; 4) Head-to-head away goals scored
(C) Champions; (O) Play-off winners; (P) Promoted; (R) Relegated

== Results ==
Home \ Away	ARS	BAS	BEL	BES	DPL	KAR	KOZ	NOV	OHR	OSO	PEL	POB	SAS	SKO	TET	VRN
Arsimi	—	2–0	2–1	0–2	2–1	3–0	0–2	2–0	0–0	2–2	1–1	8–1	4–0	1–1	2–1	1–0
Bashkimi	1–2	—	0–3	0–3	1–0	5–1	2–0	1–0	1–0	2–1	1–2	2–1	2–2	0–0	1–0	1–1
Belasica	2–1	0–0	—	1–1	0–0	2–1	2–0	3–1	0–1	1–1	0–2	3–1	1–1	0–1	2–0	0–0
Besa	2–0	0–0	2–0	—	0–0	3–0	2–0	2–0	4–0	3–0	0–0	3–1	2–1	2–1	4–0	4–1
Detonit Plachkovica	1–0	7–0	1–0	2–0	—	2–0	2–0	3–0	1–0	3–0	1–0	1–1	0–0	1–0	2–0	1–0
Karaorman	0–6	1–2	0–4	0–2	0–1	—	1–0	1–3	0–0	2–0	1–4	0–2	0–3	0–1	1–4	2–0
Kozhuf	0–2	2–0	1–1	0–2	0–0	3–0	—	2–1	2–0	2–0	3–2	0–0	3–2	4–2	3–4	0–1
Novaci	2–0	1–0	1–3	1–4	0–1	6–0	1–0	—	1–3	1–2	1–3	2–2	1–0	2–1	1–1	3–2
Ohrid	1–0	0–2	2–1	1–3	3–1	1–0	2–0	2–2	—	5–0	1–3	1–0	1–1	1–0	2–0	2–3
Osogovo	1–1	2–3	3–1	0–4	1–3	2–1	3–2	1–0	0–3	—	3–0	0–0	1–1	2–1	4–0	2–2
Pelister	3–0	4–0	3–0	1–2	0–0	4–1	1–0	4–0	1–0	2–1	—	1–0	2–0	0–0	3–0	3–1
Pobeda	0–3	0–1	0–0	1–5	2–0	1–2	0–1	1–1	0–0	1–0	0–2	—	2–1	1–0	5–1	1–1
Sasa	2–3	1–0	2–4	0–3	1–3	2–2	1–0	1–3	1–1	2–1	0–3	2–1	—	1–1	1–2	5–3
Skopje	1–0	3–1	2–2	0–0	1–4	2–1	0–0	2–1	3–0	1–0	0–1	1–1	1–0	—	2–0	1–0
Teteks	4–6	0–0	1–2	0–7	4–0	1–1	1–1	0–2	2–1	2–1	0–1	0–0	1–3	2–0	—	1–2
Vardar Negotino	0–0	1–0	1–0	0–1	2–0	2–0	1–2	2–1	0–1	3–0	0–1	3–2	1–0	2–0	0–0	—

Source: MacedonianFootball.com
Legend: Blue = home team win; Yellow = draw; Red = away team win.

== Macedonian Second Football League play-off ==
The fourteenth-placed team (Pobeda) qualified for the Macedonian Second Football League play-off alongside the five group winners from the 2023–24 Macedonian Third Football League (Borec, Korabi Debar, Kumanovo, Vardarski, and Vëllazërimi J 1977). The six teams were randomly drawn against each other for the final three places in the 2024–25 Macedonian Second Football League.

25 May 2024
17:00 CEST

Vardarski	3–2	Korabi
A. Stojanov 8', 29'; Tanov 72'	Report	Mucha 17'; Lleshi 63'

Boris Trajkovski Stadium, Skopje

25 May 2024
17:00 CEST

Pobeda	2–1	Kumanovo
Debreshlioski 62'; Sharkoski 71'	Report	Desnikj 73'

Gjorche Petrov Stadium, Skopje

25 May 2024
17:00 CEST

Vëllazërimi J 1977	2–3	Borec
Imeri 8'; Adili 30'	Report	P. Stojanov 26', 57'; Jordanovski 78'

Petar Miloshevski Stadium, Bitola

== Top scorers ==
As of 20 May 2024.

Rank	Player	Club	Goals
1	(North Macedonia) Izair Emini	Besa	14
2	(North Macedonia) Mario Stankovski	Teteks	13
3	(North Macedonia) Fiton Ademi	Besa	12
3	(North Macedonia) Simeon Hristov	Pelister	12
3	(North Macedonia) Bojan Spirkoski	Pelister	12
6	(North Macedonia) Sasho Dukov	Sasa	10
6	(North Macedonia) Stefan Jovanovski	Novaci	10
6	(North Macedonia) Blagoja Ljamchevski	Pelister	10
6	(North Macedonia) Toshe Manov	Osogovo	10
10	(North Macedonia) Ajradin Cuculi	Arsimi	9
10	(North Macedonia) Emran Ramadani	Arsimi	9
10	(North Macedonia) Ive Trifunovski	Novaci	9

== See also ==
- 2023–24 Macedonian Football Cup
- 2023–24 Macedonian First Football League
