= 2022–23 Macedonian Football Cup =

Tournament details
- Country: North Macedonia
- Dates: 14 September 2022 – 20 May 2023
- Teams: 30

Final positions
- Champions: Makedonija G.P. (3rd title)
- Runners-up: Struga

Tournament statistics
- Matches played: 28
- Goals scored: 81 (2.89 per match)

The 2022–23 Macedonian Football Cup was the 31st season of North Macedonia's football knockout competition. The winners qualified for the 2023–24 Europa Conference League first qualifying round.

Makedonija G.P. won the cup on 20 May 2023 with a 2–0 penalty shootout win over Struga after a 0–0 draw, their second consecutive Macedonian Football Cup win and third overall.

== Competition calendar ==
Round	Date(s)	Fixtures	Clubs	New entries
First Round	14 September 2022	14	30 → 14	none
Second Round	5, 19 October 2022	8	16 → 8	2
Quarter-finals	9 November 2022	4	8 → 4	none
Semi-finals	5 April 2023	2	4 → 2	none
Final	20 May 2023	1	2 → 1	none

== First round ==
The draw was held on 28 July 2022. The finalists from the previous season (Makedonija G.P. and Sileks) received byes.

=== Summary ===
Team 1	Score	Team 2
14 September 2022
Belasica (2)	1–3	Shkupi (1)
Karaorman (2)	0–3	Shkëndija (1)
Gostivar (2)	0–1	Pelister (2)
Kamenica Sasa (2)	0–3	Vardar (2)
Kozhuf (2)	0–2	Tikvesh (1)
BVK Konjare (3)	0–5	Rabotnichki (1)
Crno Buki (3)	0–3 (w/o)	Skopje (1)
Teteks (2)	0–6	Akademija Pandev (1)
Vardar Negotino (3)	1–2	Struga (1)
Karbinci (3)	0–6	Pobeda (1)
Sloga 1934 (2)	0–3	Bregalnica (1)
Zajazi (3)	0–3 (w/o)	Voska Sport (2)
Ljuboten (3)	3–0 (w/o)	Renova (1)
Fortuna (3)	5–3	Borec (2)

=== Matches ===
14 September 2022
15:00 CEST

Belasica (2)	1–3	Shkupi (1)
Kocev 68'	Report	Álvarez 55', 90+3'; Adetunji 63'

Stadion Blagoj Istatov, Strumica
Referee: Krumislav Gjorgiev (Shtip)

14 September 2022
15:00 CEST

Karaorman (2)	0–3	Shkëndija (1)
	Report	Gonçalves 11'; Nafiu 73'; Elezi 90+1'

Gradska Plazha, Struga
Referee: Kiril Smokvoski (Prilep)

14 September 2022
15:00 CEST

Gostivar (2)	0–1	Pelister (2)
	Report	N. Naumoski 88'

Rechica Stadium, Golema Rechica
Referee: Marjan Mladenovski (Skopje)

14 September 2022
15:00 CEST

Kamenica Sasa (2)	0–3	Vardar (2)
	Report	Hristov 11'; Desnikj 55'; Zhoglev 90+3'

Gradski stadion, Makedonska Kamenica
Referee: Marjan Dejanoski (Kichevo)

14 September 2022
15:00 CEST

Kozhuf (2)	0–2	Tikvesh (1)
	Report	Ngoba 28', 40'

Gradski stadion, Gevgelija
Referee: Ivana Projkovska (Skopje)

14 September 2022
15:00 CEST

BVK Konjare (3)	0–5	Rabotnichki (1)
	Report	Todorovski 12'; Rušević 50', 66', 71'; Stankovski 77'

Stadion Petrovec, Petrovec
Referee: Benjamin Kerimi (Skopje)

14 September 2022
15:00 CEST

Crno Buki (3)	0–3 (Awarded)	Skopje (1)

14 September 2022
15:00 CEST

Teteks (2)	0–6	Akademija Pandev (1)
	Report	Stojanov 13'; Trajkov 19', 51', 64'; Angelov 33'; Kapsarov 83'

Sports Center "Pandev", Strumica
Referee: Marjan Stojanovski (Kichevo)

14 September 2022
15:00 CEST

Vardar Negotino (3)	1–2	Struga (1)
Burovski 49'	Report	Jahja 27'; Pere 77'

Cvaj Arena, Negotino
Referee: Done Ristovski (Gevgelija)

14 September 2022
15:00 CEST

Karbinci (3)	0–6	Pobeda (1)
	Report	M. Naumoski 4' (pen.); Todoroski 6', 51'; Pop Antoski 15'; Tosheski 53'; Debreshlioski 80'

AMS Stadium, Karbinci
Referee: Aleksandar Vasilevski (Skopje)

14 September 2022
15:00 CEST

Sloga 1934 (2)	0–3	Bregalnica (1)
	Report	Nikolov 8'; Đokić 28' (pen.); Kasmi 55'

Stadion Filip II, Vinica
Attendance: 200
Referee: Blagojche Ralevski (Bitola)

14 September 2022
15:00 CEST

Zajazi (3)	0–3 (Awarded)	Voska Sport (2)

14 September 2022
15:00 CEST

Ljuboten (3)	3–0 (Awarded)	Renova (1)

14 September 2022
15:00 CEST

Fortuna (3)	5–3	Borec (2)
Jakupi 18', 23'; Canevski 41'; Saiti 44'; Memedovski 90+3'	Report	Dimovski 21'; Poposki 61'; Nikolovski 74'

Hasanbeg Arena, Skopje
Referee: Plarent Salihi (Tetovo)

== Second round ==
The draw was held on 16 September 2022.

=== Summary ===
Team 1	Score	Team 2
5 October 2022
Struga (1)	2–1	Rabotnichki (1)
Bregalnica (1)	1–0	Pelister (2)
Vardar (2)	4–0	Fortuna (3)
Akademija Pandev (1)	9–0	Ljuboten (3)
Shkupi (1)	6–0	Voska Sport (2)
Shkëndija (1)	5–0	Skopje (1)
Tikvesh (1)	0–1	Sileks (1)
19 October 2022
Pobeda (1)	0–2	Makedonija G.P. (1)

=== Matches ===
5 October 2022
14:00 CEST

Struga (1)	2–1	Rabotnichki (1)
Maleski 75'; Kochoski 81'	Report	Velkoski 14' (pen.)

Gradska Plazha, Struga
Referee: Krumislav Gjorgiev (Shtip)

5 October 2022
14:00 CEST

Bregalnica (1)	1–0	Pelister (2)
Gjorgjiev 64'	Report

Gradski stadion, Shtip
Attendance: 350
Referee: Kiril Smokvoski (Prilep)

5 October 2022
14:00 CEST

Vardar (2)	4–0	Fortuna (3)
Zhoglev 5', 20'; Hristov 37'; Cvetkov 82'	Report

Stadion Boris Trajkovski, Skopje
Referee: Aleksandar Uroshevikj (Skopje)

5 October 2022
14:00 CEST

Akademija Pandev (1)	9–0	Ljuboten (3)
Gjorgievski 6'; Dimoski 27', 60', 76'; Angelov 42', 56'; Krstevski 45'; Iliev 82' (pen.); Kapsarov 90'	Report

Sports Center "Pandev", Strumica
Referee: Hristijan Bozhinovski (Skopje)

5 October 2022
14:00 CEST

Shkupi (1)	6–0	Voska Sport (2)
Álvarez 31'; Adetunji 34', 51'; Hamidi 58'; Nesimi 80', 82'	Report

Gradska Plazha, Struga
Referee: Dimitar Pileshkov (Shtip)

5 October 2022
14:00 CEST

Shkëndija (1)	5–0	Skopje (1)
Shala 9'; Stojanovski 14' (pen.); Doriev 33'; R. Ramadani 44' (pen.); F. Ramadani 62'	Report

Gradski stadion, Tetovo
Referee: Blagojche Ralevski (Bitola)

5 October 2022
14:00 CEST

Tikvesh (1)	0–1	Sileks (1)
	Report	Ristovski 82'

Gradski stadion, Kavadarci
Referee: Marjan Mladenovski (Skopje)

19 October 2022
14:00 CEST

Pobeda (1)	0–2	Makedonija G.P. (1)
	Report	Skenderi 6'; Adem 26'

Petar Miloshevski Training Centre, Skopje
Referee: Jovan Kachevski (Struga)

== Quarter-finals ==
The draw was held on 25 October 2022.

=== Summary ===
Team 1	Score	Team 2
9 November 2022
Sileks (1)	0–0 (3–2 p)	Vardar (2)
Makedonija G.P. (1)	1–0	Akademija Pandev (1)
Shkupi (1)	0–3 (w/o)^{1}	Shkëndija (1)
Struga (1)	2–0	Bregalnica (1)

^{1} The match was abandoned on 9th minute at the result 0–1, due to the clash between home fans and players of the away team.

=== Matches ===
9 November 2022
13:00 CET

Sileks (1)	0–0	Vardar (2)
	Report; Penalties
Penalties
Ristovski (penalty scored); Aliji (penalty missed); Ljamalari (penalty scored); Cvetanoski (penalty missed); Stojchevski (penalty scored)	3–2	(penalty scored) Micevski; (penalty missed) Glishikj; (penalty missed) Risteski; (penalty scored) Markoski; (penalty missed) Popzlatanov

Gradski stadion, Kratovo
Attendance: 250
Referee: Stojanche Stojanov (Shtip)

9 November 2022
13:00 CET

Makedonija G.P. (1)	1–0	Akademija Pandev (1)
Samake 73'	Report

Stadion Gjorche Petrov, Skopje
Attendance: 100
Referee: Krumislav Gjorgiev (Shtip)

9 November 2022
13:00 CET

Shkupi (1)	0–3 (Awarded)	Shkëndija (1)
	Report	Elezi 9'

Stadion Chair, Skopje
Referee: Done Ristovski (Gevgelija)

9 November 2022
13:00 CET

Struga (1)	2–0	Bregalnica (1)
Malikji 2'; Shabani 58'	Report

Gradska Plazha, Struga
Referee: Igor Stojchevski (Skopje)

== Semi-finals ==
The draw was held on 14 March 2023.

=== Summary ===
Team 1	Score	Team 2
5 April 2023
Struga (1)	1–0	Sileks (1)
Shkëndija (1)	1–1 (3–4 p)	Makedonija G.P. (1)

=== Matches ===
5 April 2023
15:00 CEST

Struga (1)	1–0	Sileks (1)
Neziri 64'	Report

Gradska Plazha, Struga
Attendance: 500
Referee: Stojanche Trpchevski (Kavadarci)

5 April 2023
15:00 CEST

Shkëndija (1)	1–1	Makedonija G.P. (1)
Milev 65'	Report; Penalties	Lichina 13'
Penalties
Çinari (penalty missed); Milev (penalty scored); Shala (penalty scored); Totre (penalty scored); Doriev (penalty missed); Qaka (penalty missed)	3–4	(penalty scored) Mishevski; (penalty missed) Lichina; (penalty scored) Aleksovski; (penalty missed) Yago; (penalty scored) Fazli; (penalty scored) Samake

Gradski stadion, Tetovo
Referee: Aleksandar Stavrev (Skopje)

== Final ==
20 May 2023
17:00 CEST

Makedonija G.P. (1)	1–1 (a.e.t.)	Struga (1)
Mishevski 27' (pen.)	Report 1 Report 2	Jusufi 77'
Penalties
Mishevski (penalty missed); Lichina (penalty scored); Aleksovski (penalty missed); Skenderi (penalty scored)	2–0	(penalty missed) Tairi; (penalty missed) Radeski; (penalty missed) Shabani; (penalty missed) Jusufi

Petar Miloshevski Training Centre, Skopje
Attendance: 500
Referee: Igor Stojchevski (Skopje)

== Season statistics ==
=== Top scorers ===
As of 22 November 2022.

Rank	Player	Club	Goals
1	(Nigeria) Sunday Adetunji	Shkupi	3
1	(Costa Rica) Freddy Álvarez	Shkupi	3
1	(North Macedonia) Viktor Angelov	Akademija Pandev	3
1	(North Macedonia) Bojan Dimoski	Akademija Pandev	3
1	(North Macedonia) Dimitar Trajkov	Akademija Pandev	3
1	(Serbia) Anes Rušević	Rabotnichki	3
1	(North Macedonia) Vladimir Zhoglev	Vardar	3
8	(Cameroon) Anael Barga Ngoba	Tikvesh	2
8	(North Macedonia) Dashmir Elezi	Shkendija	2
8	(North Macedonia) Simeon Hristov	Vardar	2
8	(North Macedonia) Sead Jakup	Fortuna	2
8	(North Macedonia) Kostadin Kapsarov	Akademija Pandev	2
8	(Denmark) Ardit Nasimi	Shkupi	2
8	(North Macedonia) Filip Todoroski	Pobeda	2

== See also ==
- 2022–23 Macedonian First Football League
- 2022–23 Macedonian Second Football League
