= 2025–26 Macedonian Second Football League =

Macedonian Second League
- Season: 2025–26
- Champions: Bregalnica (4th title)
- Promoted: Bregalnica; Skopje; Shkëndija 77
- Relegated: Sasa; Vardar Negotino; Prespa; Sloga 1934; Pobeda; Golemo Konjari
- Matches: 240
- Goals: 785 (3.27 per match)

The 2025–26 Macedonian Second Football League was the 34th season of the Macedonian Second Football League, the second division in the Macedonian football league system. This is the fourth season since the league was returned to the united league format, for the first time since 2016–17 season. The season began on 23 August 2025 and concluded on 23 May 2026.

== Participating teams ==
Location of teams in 2025–26 Macedonian Second League

Club	City	Stadium	Capacity
Belasica	Strumica	Stadion Blagoj Istatov	6,500
Bregalnica	Shtip	Gradski stadion Štip	4,000
Detonit Plachkovica	Radovish	Gradski stadion Radovish	2,000
Golemo Konjari	Golemo Konjari	Stadion Golemo Konjari	300
Kozhuf	Gevgelija	Gradski stadion Gevgelija	1,400
Novaci	Novaci	Stadion Novaci	500
Ohrid	Ohrid	SRC Biljanini Izvori	3,000
Osogovo	Kochani	Stadion Nikola Mantov	5,000
Pobeda	Prilep	Stadion Goce Delchev	15,000
Prespa	Resen	Gradski stadion Resen	2,000
Sasa	Makedonska Kamenica	Gradski stadion M. Kamenica	5,000
Shkëndija 77	Arachinovo	Hasanbeg Arena	1,000
Skopje	Skopje	Stadion Zhelezarnica	3,000
Sloga 1934	Vinica	Gradski stadion Vinica	3,000
Teteks	Tetovo	Tetovo City Stadium	15,000
Vardar Negotino	Negotino	Cvaj Arena	1,500

== League table ==
Pos	Team	Pld	W	D	L	GF	GA	GD	Pts	Promotion, qualification or relegation
1	Bregalnica (C, P)	30	22	5	3	72	17	+55	71	Promotion to the Macedonian First League
2	Skopje (P)	30	23	2	5	72	20	+52	71	Qualification for the Macedonian First Football League play-off
3	Shkëndija 77 (P)	30	21	6	3	67	19	+48	69	Qualification for the Macedonian First Football League play-off
4	Ohrid	30	21	5	4	78	17	+61	68	
5	Belasica	30	18	4	8	57	21	+36	58	
6	Osogovo	30	16	6	8	53	27	+26	54	
7	Novaci	30	15	6	9	47	31	+16	51	
8	Detonit Plachkovica	30	14	7	9	52	28	+24	49	
9	Kozhuf (O)	30	12	9	9	50	26	+24	45	Qualification for the Macedonian Second Football League play-off
10	Teteks (O)	30	13	3	14	56	44	+12	42	Qualification for the Macedonian Second Football League play-off
11	Sasa (R)	30	9	9	12	47	53	−6	36	Qualification for the Macedonian Second Football League play-off
12	Vardar Negotino (R)	30	6	4	20	37	95	−58	22	Relegation to the Macedonian Third League
13	Prespa (R)	30	5	0	25	30	76	−46	15	Relegation to the Macedonian Third League
14	Sloga 1934 (R)	30	4	3	23	31	84	−53	15	Relegation to the Macedonian Third League
15	Pobeda (R)	30	3	2	25	19	117	−98	11	Relegation to the Macedonian Third League
16	Golemo Konjari (R)	30	2	1	27	17	110	−93	7	Relegation to the Macedonian Third League

Source: FFM.mk, MacedonianFootball.com
Rules for classification: 1) Points; 2) Head-to-head points; 3) Head-to-head goal difference; 4) Head-to-head away goals scored
(C) Champions; (O) Play-off winners; (P) Promoted; (R) Relegated

=== Results ===
Home \ Away	BEL	BRE	DPL	GKO	KOZ	NOV	OHR	OSO	POB	PRE	SAS	S77	SKO	SLO	TET	VRN
Belasica	—	0–1	1–0	4–0	0–0	0–1	0–1	0–0	1–2	3–1	1–0	0–1	3–2	3–0	3–1	8–1
Bregalnica	0–1	—	0–0	6–1	0–0	4–2	1–0	0–1	7–0	2–0	3–1	1–1	2–0	4–1	6–1	7–1
Detonit Plachkovica	0–1	0–1	—	6–0	3–2	1–1	0–2	2–4	3–1	3–0	0–0	0–0	1–0	1–0	2–1	3–1
Golemo Konjari	1–7	0–2	0–4	—	1–0	1–2	0–9	0–2	2–0	0–1	1–3	0–4	1–6	2–2	2–6	0–1
Kozhuf	0–2	2–0	0–0	3–0	—	2–0	0–1	0–0	8–0	7–1	2–2	0–1	1–1	5–2	1–4	2–2
Novaci	1–0	1–3	1–1	7–0	1–0	—	0–1	3–3	2–0	2–0	0–0	1–0	0–1	4–0	1–0	3–2
Ohrid	1–1	0–0	1–0	3–0	0–0	3–0	—	2–0	10–0	6–1	6–1	0–0	1–0	7–1	4–3	4–0
Osogovo	3–1	0–3	0–1	2–0	0–1	0–0	1–0	—	6–0	2–0	1–0	1–1	2–3	3–0	2–1	5–1
Pobeda	0–5	0–4	0–6	1–0	0–1	0–5	2–3	1–8	—	1–5	2–2	0–1	0–5	3–0	0–3	3–5
Prespa	1–3	0–3	0–3	4–2	1–3	0–3	0–2	0–1	5–0	—	1–4	0–3	0–2	1–2	3–1	1–2
Sasa	0–2	1–3	2–2	1–0	1–3	0–0	1–1	1–1	2–0	3–0	—	2–4	1–2	1–0	3–3	1–0
Shkëndija 77	0–0	1–2	1–0	4–0	2–0	5–1	2–1	1–0	5–0	4–1	2–0	—	1–2	2–1	2–0	8–2
Skopje	1–0	0–1	5–1	4–0	1–0	1–0	1–0	2–0	8–1	2–0	7–0	2–2	—	1–0	2–1	4–1
Sloga 1934	1–2	2–4	0–4	5–1	0–2	0–2	0–2	0–1	4–2	3–2	2–6	0–5	0–4	—	0–3	3–3
Teteks	0–1	0–0	3–2	7–2	0–0	2–1	1–2	3–0	1–0	2–0	3–0	1–2	0–1	2–0	—	2–0
Vardar Negotino	1–4	0–2	0–3	4–0	0–5	1–2	1–5	0–4	0–0	2–1	1–8	1–2	0–2	2–2	0–0	—

Source: FFM.mk, MacedonianFootball.com
Legend: Blue = home team win; Yellow = draw; Red = away team win.

== Macedonian Second Football League play-off ==
The teams which were placed from 9th to 11th place (Kozhuf, Teteks and Sasa) qualified for the Macedonian Second Football League play-off alongside the five group winners from the 2025–26 Macedonian Third Football League (Euromilk, Borec, Pobeda Valandovo, Kamjani, and Vllaznimi). The first three pairings were determined between the teams from the second and third tier, when in the last pairing the two teams from the third tier were drawn each other for the final four places in the 2026–27 Macedonian Second Football League.

30 May 2026
16:30 CEST

Sasa	1–2	Euromilk
Trajchov 73'	Report	Stojanovski 47'; Miftar 89'

Gradski stadion, Kratovo
Referee: Done Ristovski (Gevgelija)

30 May 2026
16:30 CEST

Kozhuf	4–0	Borec
Lembovski 18'; Todoroski 45'; Guguljanov 55'; Stojanov 72'	Report

Stadion Nikola Mantov, Kochani
Referee: Aleksandar Grujoski (Kichevo)

30 May 2026
16:30 CEST

Pobeda Valandovo	0–2	Kamjani
	Report	Berzati 5'; Ademi 8'

Gradski stadion, Shtip
Referee: Jovan Kachevski (Struga)

31 May 2026
16:30 CEST

Teteks	9–0	Vllaznimi
Elmazi 6'; Ali 29'; Jamini 44'; Misajlovski 46', 77'; Saliji 72'; Nikolovski 83', 86' (pen.); Gavroski 89'	Report

Gjorche Petrov Stadium, Skopje
Referee: Stojanche Stojanov (Shtip)

== Top scorers ==
As of 23 May 2026

Rank	Player	Club	Goals
1	(North Macedonia) Viktor Angelov	Skopje	24
2	(North Macedonia) Aziz Jamini	Teteks	19
3	(North Macedonia) Stefan Jovanovski	Novaci	18
4	(North Macedonia) Filip Dimoski	Osogovo & Pobeda	16
4	(North Macedonia) Ivan Gligorov	Ohrid	16
6	(North Macedonia) Sasho Dukov	Detonit Plachkovica	14
6	(North Macedonia) Kostadin Kapsarov	Bregalnica	14
6	(North Macedonia) Fikret Livareka	Shkendija 77	14
9	(North Macedonia) Toni Michkovski	Sasa	13
10	(North Macedonia) Andrej Simevski	Sasa	11

== See also ==
- 2025–26 Macedonian Football Cup
- 2025–26 Macedonian First Football League
