= Males (disambiguation) =

Males is the plural of male. It may also refer to:

- Males (surname)
- Males, Crete, a historic village in the municipality of Ierapetra in Lasithi prefecture
- FK Maleš, a football club from Berovo, North Macedonia
