= 2022–23 Macedonian Second Football League =

Macedonian Second League
- Season: 2022–23
- Champions: Voska Sport
- Promoted: Voska Sport; Gostivar; Vardar
- Relegated: Lokomotiva; Sloga 1934; Borec
- Matches: 240
- Goals: 674 (2.81 per match)
- Top goalscorer: Behar Feta (29 goals)

The 2022–23 Macedonian Second Football League was the 31st season of the Macedonian Second Football League, the second division in the Macedonian football league system. That was the first season since the league was returned to the united league format, for the first time since 2016–17 season. The season began on 20 August 2022.

== Participating teams ==
Location of teams in 2022–23 Macedonian Second League

Club	City	Stadium	Capacity
Arsimi	Chegrane	Stadion Chegrane	
Belasica	Strumica	Stadion Blagoj Istatov	6,500
Besa	Dobri Dol	Global Arena	4,000
Borec	Veles	Stadion Zoran Paunov	2,000
Detonit Plachkovica	Radovish	Gradski stadion Radovish	2,000
Gostivar	Gostivar	Gradski stadion Gostivar	1,000
Karaorman	Struga	Stadion Gradska Plazha	2,500
Kozhuf	Gevgelija	Gradski stadion Gevgelija	1,400
Lokomotiva	Skopje	Lokomotiva Stadium	500
Ohrid	Ohrid	SRC Biljanini Izvori	3,980
Pelister	Bitola	Stadion Petar Miloshevski	9,100
Sasa	Makedonska Kamenica	Gradski stadion M. Kamenica	5,000
Sloga 1934	Vinica	Gradski stadion Vinica	3,000
Teteks	Tetovo	AMS Sportski Centar Tetovo	2,000
Vardar	Skopje	Stadion Zhelezarnica; Stadion Boris Trajkovski	3,000; 3,000
Voska Sport	Ohrid	SRC Biljanini Izvori	3,980

== League table ==
Pos	Team	Pld	W	D	L	GF	GA	GD	Pts	Promotion or relegation
1	Voska Sport (C, P)	30	23	6	1	84	25	+59	75	Promotion to Macedonian First League
2	Gostivar (Note: Gostivar were deducted three points due playing an illegible player in the 16th round.) (P)	30	23	7	0	71	11	+60	73	Promotion to Macedonian First League
3	Vardar (P)	30	19	6	5	55	20	+35	63	Qualification to Promotion play-off match
4	Pelister	30	17	7	6	64	26	+38	58	
5	Detonit Plachkovica	30	14	8	8	43	35	+8	50	
6	Besa	30	15	3	12	43	29	+14	48	
7	Ohrid	30	12	5	13	31	35	−4	41	
8	Arsimi	30	12	4	14	41	35	+6	40	
9	Kozhuf	30	10	6	14	40	54	−14	36	
10	Belasica	30	10	5	15	36	47	−11	35	
11	Karaorman	30	9	7	14	30	40	−10	34	
12	Sasa	30	8	7	15	31	49	−18	31	
13	Teteks (O)	30	9	4	17	31	78	−47	31	Qualification to Relegation play-offs
14	Lokomotiva (R)	30	8	6	16	35	41	−6	30	Relegation to Macedonian Third League
15	Sloga 1934 (R)	30	6	7	17	26	47	−21	25	Relegation to Macedonian Third League
16	Borec (R)	30	0	2	28	13	102	−89	2	Relegation to Macedonian Third League

Source: MacedonianFootball.com
Rules for classification: 1) Points; 2) Head-to-head points; 3) Head-to-head goal difference; 4) Head-to-head away goals scored
(C) Champions; (O) Play-off winners; (P) Promoted; (R) Relegated

== Results ==
Home \ Away	ARS	BEL	BES	BOR	DPL	GOS	KAR	KOZ	LOK	OHR	PEL	SAS	SLO	TET	VAR	VOS
Arsimi	—	2–0	2–0	9–0	0–1	0–2	3–1	2–1	0–0	1–0	0–1	2–1	0–0	3–4	0–1	1–2
Belasica	0–1	—	1–0	5–0	2–1	0–3	1–0	3–1	1–1	1–1	2–1	2–0	2–3	4–0	0–1	1–3
Besa	1–0	3–0	—	3–0	3–0	1–1	1–0	3–0	2–0	1–3	1–2	2–0	3–2	6–1	2–1	0–1
Borec	2–4	0–1	0–4	—	1–2	0–2	0–2	0–2	0–3	1–2	0–4	0–3	1–2	2–4	0–3	1–7
Detonit Plachkovica	3–1	2–0	3–0	1–0	—	0–2	0–0	0–0	3–2	1–1	1–0	5–1	2–1	1–0	1–1	1–1
Gostivar	2–0	0–0	1–0	4–0	1–1	—	5–1	5–1	1–0	3–0	1–1	1–0	5–0	5–0	1–0	2–2
Karaorman	2–0	3–1	0–0	4–0	1–1	0–2	—	0–0	1–1	1–0	2–1	1–2	2–0	1–0	1–2	0–2
Kozhuf	1–2	4–2	2–0	1–1	2–0	0–3	0–2	—	2–1	2–1	2–4	3–2	2–0	4–1	3–1	1–2
Lokomotiva	0–3	3–0	2–0	3–2	1–3	2–3	3–0	3–0	—	0–1	2–3	2–1	0–0	0–0	1–2	1–2
Ohrid	2–0	3–0	2–1	2–0	2–0	1–2	1–0	0–0	1–1	—	0–1	1–0	2–0	2–1	0–1	2–2
Pelister	3–1	1–0	0–0	4–0	2–0	1–3	2–0	5–0	2–1	3–0	—	0–0	3–0	11–0	2–2	1–1
Sasa	1–0	1–1	1–2	4–1	1–1	0–3	2–2	1–1	2–1	2–1	1–2	—	1–0	0–0	0–3	0–4
Sloga 1934	0–0	1–2	0–1	4–0	1–3	0–1	0–0	2–1	0–1	3–0	1–1	1–1	—	1–1	0–3	1–3
Teteks	0–2	3–2	1–2	1–1	1–3	0–7	2–1	4–2	1–0	2–0	2–1	0–3	0–3	—	0–2	0–4
Vardar	1–1	1–1	1–0	6–0	2–0	0–0	4–1	2–0	2–0	2–0	1–1	3–0	3–0	1–2	—	2–1
Voska Sport	3–1	4–1	2–1	6–0	5–3	0–0	4–1	2–2	3–0	3–0	2–1	4–0	3–0	4–0	2–1	—

Source: MacedonianFootball.com
Legend: Blue = home team win; Yellow = draw; Red = away team win.

== Relegation play-offs ==
28 May 2023
17:00 CEST

Osogovo	1–6	Teteks
Cvetanov 65'	Report	Saliji 13', 75'; Jusuf 16', 85'; T. Stojkovski 36'; Kirovski 90+1'

Boris Trajkovski Stadium, Skopje
Referee: Igor Ivanov (Veles)

28 May 2023
17:00 CEST

Bashkimi	3–0	Vëllazërimi J 1977
Alili 16'; Aziri 23', 90+5'	Report

Ecolog Arena, Tetovo
Referee: Blagojche Ralevski (Bitola)

28 May 2023
17:00 CEST

Novaci	1–1	Vardar Negotino
A. Stojkovski 33'	Report	Nedelkov 90'
Penalties
Krklinski (penalty scored); Stefanovski (penalty scored); Nedanovski (penalty missed); Jovanovski (penalty missed); A. Stojkovski (penalty missed)	2–3	(penalty scored) Najdov; (penalty missed) Nacev; (penalty scored) Andonov; (penalty missed) Ristovski; (penalty scored) Ilov

Gradski stadion, Kichevo
Referee: Jovan Kachevski (Struga)

Osogovo and Novaci were also promoted because they were drawn as a lucky losers.

== Top scorers ==
As of 15 May 2023.

Rank	Player	Club	Goals
1	(North Macedonia) Behar Feta	Voska Sport	29
2	(North Macedonia) Antonio Kalanoski	Gostivar	25
3	(North Macedonia) Izair Emini	Voska Sport	15
3	(North Macedonia) Borche Manevski	Pelister	15
5	(North Macedonia) Fiton Ademi	Besa & Voska Sport	13
6	(North Macedonia) Emran Ramadani	Gostivar	12
7	(North Macedonia) Sasho Dukov	Pelister & Sasa	10
8	(North Macedonia) Shpend Asani	Arsimi	9
8	(North Macedonia) Dario Desnikj	Vardar	9
8	(North Macedonia) Alen Jasharoski	Voska Sport	9
8	(North Macedonia) Florent Osmani	Lokomotiva	9
8	(North Macedonia) Bojan Spirkoski	Pelister	9
8	(Bosnia and Herzegovina) (North Macedonia) Boško Stupić	Sasa & Sloga 1934	9
8	(North Macedonia) Vladimir Zhoglev	Vardar	9

== See also ==
- 2022–23 Macedonian Football Cup
- 2022–23 Macedonian First Football League
