= 2024–25 Macedonian Second Football League =

Macedonian Second League
- Season: 2024–25
- Champions: Makedonija G.P. (4th titles)
- Promoted: Makedonija G.P. Arsimi; Bashkimi
- Relegated: Borec; Vardarski
- Matches: 240
- Goals: 583 (2.43 per match)

The 2024–25 Macedonian Second Football League was the 33rd season of the Macedonian Second Football League, the second division in the Macedonian football league system. This is the third season since the league was returned to the united league format, for the first time since 2016–17 season. The season began on 17 August 2024.

== Participating teams ==
Location of teams in 2024–25 Macedonian Second League

| Club | City | Stadium | Capacity |
|---|---|---|---|
| Arsimi | Chegrane | Stadion Chegrane | |
| Bashkimi | Kumanovo | KF Bashkimi Stadium | 3,500 |
| Belasica | Strumica | Stadion Blagoj Istatov | 6,500 |
| Borec | Veles | Stadion Zoran Paunov | 2,000 |
| Bregalnica | Shtip | Gradski stadion Štip | 4,000 |
| Detonit Plachkovica | Radovish | Gradski stadion Radovish | 2,000 |
| Kozhuf | Gevgelija | Gradski stadion Gevgelija | 1,400 |
| Makedonija G.P. | Skopje | Gjorče Petrov Stadium | 3,000 |
| Novaci | Novaci | Stadion Novaci | 500 |
| Ohrid | Ohrid | SRC Biljanini Izvori | 3,000 |
| Osogovo | Kochani | Stadion Nikola Mantov | 5,000 |
| Pobeda | Prilep | Stadion Goce Delchev | 15,000 |
| Sasa | Makedonska Kamenica | Gradski stadion M. Kamenica | 5,000 |
| Skopje | Skopje | Stadion Zhelezarnica | 3,000 |
| Vardar Negotino | Negotino | Cvaj Arena | 1,500 |
| Vardarski | Bogdanci | Gradski Stadion Bogdanci | 500 |

== League table ==
| Pos | Team | Pld | W | D | L | GF | GA | GD | Pts | Promotion, qualification or relegation |
|---|---|---|---|---|---|---|---|---|---|---|
| 1 | Makedonija G.P. (C, P) | 30 | 19 | 8 | 3 | 48 | 9 | +39 | 65 | Promotion to the Macedonian First League |
| 2 | Arsimi (P) | 30 | 20 | 5 | 5 | 56 | 25 | +31 | 65 | Promotion to the Macedonian First League |
| 3 | Bashkimi (P) | 30 | 20 | 6 | 4 | 51 | 23 | +28 | 63 | Qualification for the Macedonian First Football League play-off |
| 4 | Bregalnica | 30 | 17 | 7 | 6 | 38 | 23 | +15 | 58 | |
| 5 | Detonit Plachkovica | 30 | 10 | 14 | 6 | 40 | 30 | +10 | 44 | |
| 6 | Sasa | 30 | 12 | 6 | 12 | 48 | 44 | +4 | 42 | |
| 7 | Ohrid 2004 | 30 | 12 | 6 | 12 | 36 | 40 | −4 | 42 | |
| 8 | Belasica | 30 | 10 | 11 | 9 | 36 | 29 | +7 | 41 | |
| 9 | Kozhuf | 30 | 9 | 12 | 9 | 32 | 27 | +5 | 39 | |
| 10 | Skopje | 30 | 9 | 12 | 9 | 32 | 32 | 0 | 39 | |
| 11 | Novaci | 30 | 9 | 8 | 13 | 32 | 36 | −4 | 35 | |
| 12 | Pobeda | 30 | 8 | 9 | 13 | 28 | 34 | −6 | 33 | |
| 13 | Vardar Negotino | 30 | 10 | 3 | 17 | 34 | 52 | −18 | 33 | |
| 14 | Osogovo | 30 | 7 | 8 | 15 | 29 | 44 | −15 | 29 | |
| 15 | Borec (R) | 30 | 4 | 5 | 21 | 22 | 54 | −32 | 17 | Relegation to the Macedonian Third League |
| 16 | Vardarski (R) | 30 | 3 | 2 | 25 | 21 | 81 | −60 | 11 | Relegation to the Macedonian Third League |

Source: FFM.mk, MacedonianFootball.com
Rules for classification: 1) Points; 2) Head-to-head points; 3) Head-to-head goal difference; 4) Head-to-head away goals scored
(C) Champions; (P) Promoted; (R) Relegated

== Results ==
| Home \ Away | ARS | BAS | BEL | BOR | BRE | DPL | KOZ | MGP | NOV | OHR | OSO | POB | SAS | SKO | VRN | VRD |
|---|---|---|---|---|---|---|---|---|---|---|---|---|---|---|---|---|
| Arsimi | — | 0–1 | 4–2 | 1–0 | 2–1 | 2–1 | 1–0 | 0–0 | 1–0 | 1–1 | 3–1 | 1–0 | 4–1 | 0–0 | 5–1 | 3–0 |
| Bashkimi | 2–1 | — | 1–1 | 1–1 | 2–1 | 3–2 | 1–0 | 1–2 | 0–0 | 3–0 | 5–1 | 3–1 | 2–1 | 1–1 | 5–2 | 2–0 |
| Belasica | 0–1 | 1–2 | — | 1–1 | 0–1 | 1–2 | 0–0 | 0–4 | 3–0 | 1–1 | 1–0 | 1–1 | 2–2 | 1–0 | 4–0 | 4–1 |
| Borec | 2–4 | 0–1 | 0–1 | — | 0–1 | 0–0 | 2–1 | 0–2 | 0–1 | 4–1 | 1–3 | 0–1 | 2–1 | 2–2 | 1–2 | 3–1 |
| Bregalnica | 2–1 | 0–1 | 1–0 | 4–0 | — | 1–1 | 1–0 | 0–0 | 3–1 | 2–0 | 1–1 | 2–1 | 2–1 | 1–1 | 2–0 | 2–0 |
| Detonit Plachkovica | 0–0 | 3–1 | 2–1 | 2–0 | 1–1 | — | 1–1 | 0–0 | 2–4 | 3–2 | 0–1 | 2–2 | 1–2 | 1–0 | 1–1 | 1–1 |
| Kozhuf | 1–1 | 1–2 | 1–1 | 2–0 | 0–2 | 0–0 | — | 0–0 | 5–1 | 0–0 | 4–1 | 1–0 | 2–2 | 0–1 | 3–2 | 1–0 |
| Makedonija G.P. | 1–0 | 0–1 | 0–0 | 3–0 | 3–0 | 1–0 | 3–0 | — | 4–0 | 2–0 | 2–0 | 3–0 | 1–1 | 1–0 | 5–0 | 4–0 |
| Novaci | 0–2 | 0–0 | 0–0 | 1–1 | 0–2 | 0–0 | 0–0 | 3–0 | — | 2–1 | 5–0 | 0–0 | 0–1 | 4–0 | 2–0 | 4–0 |
| Ohrid | 2–4 | 0–1 | 2–1 | 4–1 | 0–1 | 1–3 | 1–0 | 0–1 | 3–1 | — | 2–2 | 0–0 | 2–1 | 1–1 | 1–0 | 3–0 |
| Osogovo | 1–2 | 1–0 | 0–0 | 1–0 | 1–2 | 1–3 | 0–0 | 0–0 | 2–0 | 0–2 | — | 4–1 | 1–3 | 1–1 | 1–2 | 4–0 |
| Pobeda | 1–2 | 0–0 | 0–1 | 5–0 | 0–0 | 0–0 | 1–2 | 2–1 | 1–0 | 0–1 | 0–0 | — | 1–0 | 0–2 | 0–1 | 6–2 |
| Sasa | 2–1 | 0–5 | 1–2 | 2–0 | 4–0 | 0–2 | 1–1 | 0–0 | 0–0 | 1–2 | 1–0 | 4–1 | — | 0–3 | 4–2 | 5–1 |
| Skopje | 0–2 | 2–1 | 0–2 | 2–1 | 0–0 | 2–2 | 1–1 | 0–1 | 2–0 | 1–2 | 0–0 | 0–0 | 3–2 | — | 2–1 | 2–2 |
| Vardar Negotino | 0–4 | 0–1 | 2–2 | 1–0 | 1–0 | 0–0 | 0–2 | 0–1 | 3–1 | 0–1 | 1–0 | 1–2 | 0–1 | 2–0 | — | 6–1 |
| Vardarski | 1–2 | 0–3 | 0–1 | 2–0 | 1–2 | 1–4 | 1–3 | 0–2 | 0–2 | 3–0 | 2–1 | 0–1 | 1–4 | 0–3 | 0–3 | — |

Source: FFM.mk, MacedonianFootball.com
Legend: Blue = home team win; Yellow = draw; Red = away team win.

== Macedonian Second Football League play-off ==
The fourteenth-placed team (Osogovo) qualified for the Macedonian Second Football League play-off alongside the five group winners from the 2024–25 Macedonian Third Football League (Golemo Konjari, Prespa, Shkëndija 77, Sloga 1934, and Teteks). The six teams were randomly drawn against each other for the final three places in the 2025–26 Macedonian Second Football League.

24 May 2025
17:00 CEST

| Osogovo | 1–2 | Shkëndija 77 |
|---|---|---|
| Simoski 52' | Report | Gjorgjieski 38' (pen.); Iljazi 59' |

Gradski Stadion, Kavadarci
Referee: Fatmir Bafto (Ohrid)

24 May 2025
17:00 CEST

| Prespa | 0–3 | Sloga 1934 |
|---|---|---|
| | Report | Stojanov 5'; Petkovski 31'; Hristovski 40' |

Petar Miloshevski Training Centre, Skopje
Referee: Vlatko Ilioski (Prilep)

24 May 2025
17:00 CEST

| Golemo Konjari | 2–2 | Teteks |
|---|---|---|
| Koteski 88'; Alimoski 90' | Report | Elmazi 19'; Jamini 24' |
Penalties
| Alimoski (penalty missed); Srkeski (penalty missed); Naumoski (penalty scored); Imeroski (penalty missed) | 1–3 | (penalty scored) Elmazi; (penalty missed) Jamini; (penalty missed) Dauti; (penalty scored) Saljiu; (penalty scored) Nikolovski |

Gjorche Petrov Stadium, Skopje
Referee: Done Ristovski (Gevgelija)

Golemo Konjari was also promoted and Osogovo stayed because they were drawn as a lucky losers.

== Top scorers ==
=== Top scorers ===
As of 22 May 2025.

| Rank | Player | Club | Goals |
|---|---|---|---|
| 1 | (North Macedonia) Albin Ramadani | Arsimi | 19 |
| 2 | (North Macedonia) Simeon Hristov | Makedonija G.P. | 18 |
| 3 | (North Macedonia) Andrej Simevski | Sasa | 15 |
| 4 | (North Macedonia) Sasho Dukov | Ohrid & Kozhuf | 14 |
| 5 | (North Macedonia) Husein Demiri | Bashkimi | 13 |
| 6 | (North Macedonia) Alban Taipi | Arsimi | 11 |
| 7 | (North Macedonia) Oliver Dishlievski | Ohrid | 9 |
| 7 | (North Macedonia) Nikola Taleski | Pobeda | 9 |
| 9 | (North Macedonia) David Kalpachki | Bregalnica | 8 |
| 9 | (North Macedonia) Vladimir Zhoglev | Skopje & Osogovo | 8 |

== See also ==
- 2024–25 Macedonian Football Cup
- 2024–25 Macedonian First Football League
