= 2025–26 Macedonian Third Football League =

Macedonian Third League
- Season: 2025–26

The 2025–26 Macedonian Third Football League was the 34th season of the third-tier football league in North Macedonia, since its establishment. The season began on 7 September 2025 and concluded on 24 May 2026.

== North ==
=== Table ===
Pos	Team	Pld	W	D	L	GF	GA	GD	Pts	Promotion or relegation
1	Euromilk (C, P)	26	23	1	2	96	21	+75	70	Qualification to Promotion play-offs
2	BVK Konjare	26	17	3	6	81	50	+31	54	
3	Kumanovo	26	15	6	5	65	36	+29	51	
4	Aerodrom	26	13	8	5	66	46	+20	47	
5	Besa Saraj	26	13	3	10	53	46	+7	42	
6	Pchinja	26	11	5	10	68	51	+17	38	
7	Studenichan	26	11	4	11	57	57	0	37	
8	R'zhanichino	26	10	6	10	56	53	+3	36	
9	Fortuna	26	10	5	11	56	44	+12	35	
10	Besa Slupchane	26	11	1	14	58	68	−10	34	
11	Bashkimi (Lj) (Note: Bashkimi (Lj) were deducted 3 points playing the Round 18 match.)	26	7	5	14	44	69	−25	23	
12	Kadino (R)	26	4	5	17	27	87	−60	17	Relegation to Macedonian Municipal Leagues
13	Lopati 97 (Note: Lopati 97 were deducted 3 points.) (R)	26	4	4	18	30	71	−41	13	Relegation to Macedonian Municipal Leagues
14	Hotla (R)	26	3	4	19	28	86	−58	13	Relegation to Macedonian Municipal Leagues

Source: MacedonianFootball.com
Rules for classification: 1) Points; 2) Head-to-head points; 3) Head-to-head goal difference; 4) Head-to-head away goals scored.
(C) Champions; (P) Promoted; (R) Relegated

=== Results ===
Home \ Away	AER	BSL	BSA	BES	BVK	EUR	FOR	HOT	KAD	KUM	LOP	PCH	RZH	STU
Aerodrom	—	6–0	1–2	2–1	1–1	2–2	2–2	5–0	9–0	2–1	1–0	2–2	3–2	9–3
Bashkimi (Lj)	0–0	—	2–1	3–2	1–3	3–7	2–1	0–1	3–0 (Note: Match awarded)	2–3	5–1	4–3	2–2	3–0
Besa Saraj	1–1	2–0	—	2–3	1–5	1–3	2–1	1–1	7–2	3–1	1–0	2–1	2–3	4–1
Besa Slupchane	1–2	5–3	2–1	—	2–3	1–2	3–2	4–3	4–2	0–5	6–2	4–2	5–0	2–2
BVK Konjare	3–1	6–1	2–1	3–4	—	2–3	4–2	6–1	3–1	3–2	3–0	5–6	4–2	4–2
Euromilk	3–0	7–0	0–1	3–1	1–0	—	4–1	6–0	6–0	5–0	6–1	5–1	3–2	2–1
Fortuna	1–3	3–2	2–0	3–0	1–1	1–4	—	6–0	7–0	1–1	6–1	1–1	6–0	1–1
Hotla	1–2	2–2	0–3	2–4	2–3	0–2	1–2	—	2–0	1–4	1–2	1–6	1–1	1–3
Kadino	3–3	2–2	0–3	3–2	1–3	1–8	1–0	2–2	—	1–3	0–0	2–1	1–0	2–3
Kumanovo	3–2	5–2	4–0	4–1	3–1	1–3	1–0	4–0	0–0	—	1–0	3–1	2–2	6–0
Lopati 97	1–3	2–2	1–3	2–0	2–4	0–4	2–5	2–3	4–2	1–1	—	1–1	1–4	0–4
Pchinja	1–1	1–0	6–2	5–0	1–4	1–0	5–0	5–2	8–0	2–4	3–1	—	2–2	2–0
R'zhanichino	1–2	2–0	2–5	6–1	2–2	0–3	3–0	7–0	1–0	2–2	2–1	3–0	—	2–0
Studenichan	11–1	2–0	2–2	1–0	6–3	0–4	0–1	4–0	3–1	1–1	0–2	2–1	5–3	—

Source: MacedonianFootball.com
Legend: Blue = home team win; Yellow = draw; Red = away team win.

== South ==
=== Table ===
Pos	Team	Pld	W	D	L	GF	GA	GD	Pts	Promotion or relegation
1	Borec (C)	23	20	1	2	88	15	+73	61	Qualification to Promotion play-offs
2	Prevalec	23	17	2	4	71	19	+52	53	
3	Venec	23	15	1	7	59	37	+22	46	
4	Ultras	23	12	3	8	74	45	+29	39	
5	Pitu Guli	23	11	3	9	44	39	+5	36	
6	Bashkimi (GJ)	23	9	6	8	40	27	+13	33	
7	Rosoman 83	23	8	4	11	44	62	−18	28	
8	Vlaznimi Junior	23	8	3	12	46	60	−14	27	
9	Mlekar	23	7	4	12	35	49	−14	25	
10	Mladost 1930 (R)	23	8	0	15	33	78	−45	24	Withdraw from the league
11	Buchin	23	6	4	13	36	70	−34	22	
12	Topolka (R)	23	5	4	14	37	54	−17	19	Relegation to Macedonian Municipal Leagues
13	Drenovo (R)	12	0	1	11	12	64	−52	1	Withdraw from the league
14	Sloga 1976 (R)	0	0	0	0	0	0	0	0	Withdraw from the league

Source: MacedonianFootball.com
Rules for classification: 1) Points; 2) Head-to-head points; 3) Head-to-head goal difference; 4) Head-to-head away goals scored.
(C) Champions; (R) Relegated

=== Results ===
Home \ Away	BGJ	BOR	BUC	DRE	MLA	MLE	PIT	PRE	ROS	TOP	ULT	VLP	VEN
Bashkimi (GJ)	—	0–1	4–0	7–1	6–0	0–0	2–0	1–1	1–1	0–0	3–1	3–2	0–1
Borec	3–0	—	4–0	—	7–0	4–0	5–0	1–0	6–1	2–0	8–0	4–0	4–0
Buchin	1–1	6–5	—	—	3–0	3–1	1–3	0–6	2–2	4–1	2–6	1–6	1–0
Drenovo	—	2–5	1–1	—	—	—	—	1–8	—	—	1–7	0–3	—
Mladost 1930	0–2	1–5	3–1	4–1	—	3–5	0–6	0–1	3–0 (Note: Match awarded)	3–0	0–4	5–2	4–3
Mlekar	2–0	0–3	3–2	7–0	2–0	—	0–1	1–3	7–0	1–1	1–4	1–1	1–2
Pitu Guli	1–1	1–1	2–1	5–0	3–1	2–0	—	2–1	5–1	1–3	2–5	3–0	3–2
Prevalec	3–0	0–4	5–0	—	7–0	6–0	2–2	—	6–1	1–0	2–0	5–0	5–2
Rosoman 83	0–4	1–0	7–2	8–2	1–3	2–1	2–0	0–2	—	3–3	1–1	3–0	0–1
Topolka	1–2	0–7	3–3	3–0	0–1	6–0	3–0	1–2	0–3	—	0–6	8–1	3–4
Ultras	4–1	2–5	4–1	—	10–1	0–0	2–1	1–2	5–0	4–1	—	3–6	2–3
Vëllazërimi (P)	2–1	1–3	0–1	—	7–1	0–1	4–0	0–3	6–4	2–0	1–1	—	2–2
Venec	2–1	0–1	3–0	6–3	2–0	6–1	2–1	2–0	2–3	4–0	3–2	7–0	—

Source: MacedonianFootball.com
Legend: Blue = home team win; Yellow = draw; Red = away team win.

== East ==
=== Table ===
Pos	Team	Pld	W	D	L	GF	GA	GD	Pts	Promotion or relegation
1	Pobeda Valandovo (C)	18	15	2	1	48	12	+36	47	Qualification to Promotion play-offs
2	Ovche Pole	18	14	1	3	55	20	+35	43	
3	Udarnik	18	11	4	3	50	26	+24	37	
4	Horizont Turnovo	18	10	4	4	45	28	+17	34	
5	Bregalnica 1926	18	6	4	8	26	31	−5	22	
6	Karbinci	18	5	6	7	31	29	+2	21	
7	Tiverija (Note: Tiverija were deducted 3 points playing the Round 20 match.)	18	5	2	11	38	49	−11	14	
8	Malesh	18	3	4	11	21	45	−24	13	
9	Dojransko Ezero	18	1	3	14	17	69	−52	6	
10	Rudar (Note: Rudar and Svetlost (Z) opted not to play the second half-season and because of that were deducted 9 points each.) (R)	10	3	2	5	12	14	−2	2	Withdraw from the league
11	Svetlost (Z) (R)	10	0	4	6	12	32	−20	−5	Withdraw from the league

Source: MacedonianFootball.com
Rules for classification: 1) Points; 2) Head-to-head points; 3) Head-to-head goal difference; 4) Head-to-head away goals scored.
(C) Champions; (R) Relegated

=== Results ===
Home \ Away	BRE	DOJ	TUR	KAR	MAL	OVC	POB	RUD	SVE	TIV	UDA
Bregalnica 1926	—	5–1	2–2	2–5	1–1	0–1	1–2	2–1	4–1	0–2	1–0
Dojransko Ezero	0–3	—	2–3	1–1	2–2	4–6	0–1	—		0–2	0–4
Horizont Turnovo	3–0 (Note: Match awarded)	2–0	—	3–3	9–1	2–0	3–3	3–0	4–1	1–0	1–4
Karbinci	1–1	3–0	0–3	—	2–1	2–3	1–3	—	—	7–2	1–3
Malesh	0–0	1–2	1–0	1–0	—	1–5	2–3	—	—	4–1	0–1
Ovche Pole	4–0	7–0	5–1	2–1	3–0	—	1–0	3–0	—	3–0	1–2
Pobeda Valandovo	3–0	3–0	2–0	1–0	8–1	3–1	—	—	—	3–0	3–0
Rudar	—	7–0	—	1–1	2–1	—	0–1	—	0–0	—	—
Svetlost (Z)	—	2–2	—	0–1	1–1	1–1	1–3	—	—	—	—
Tiverija	2–3	10–2	2–3	1–1	2–1	0–3	1–6	0–1	9–3	—	3–3
Udarnik	2–1	7–1	2–2	1–1	3–2	3–6	0–0	3–0	7–2	5–1	—

Source: MacedonianFootball.com
Legend: Blue = home team win; Yellow = draw; Red = away team win.

== West ==
=== Table ===
Pos	Team	Pld	W	D	L	GF	GA	GD	Pts	Promotion or relegation
1	Kamjani (C, P)	20	17	1	2	64	18	+46	52	Qualification to Promotion play-offs
2	Vëllazërimi J 1977	20	15	2	3	59	27	+32	47	
3	Djepchishte	20	13	3	4	58	28	+30	42	
4	Vardar (B)	20	11	1	8	50	34	+16	34	
5	Napredok	20	10	1	9	42	36	+6	31	
6	Reçica	20	7	3	10	43	44	−1	24	
7	Drita 94	20	7	2	11	37	54	−17	23	
8	Dobroshti	20	6	2	12	43	60	−17	20	
9	Renova (R)	20	6	2	12	42	61	−19	20	Withdraw from the league
10	Skenderbeu	20	4	3	13	18	50	−32	15	
11	Ljuboten	20	2	4	14	22	66	−44	10	
12	Zajazi (R)	0	0	0	0	0	0	0	0	Withdraw from the league

Source: MacedonianFootball.com
Rules for classification: 1) Points; 2) Head-to-head points; 3) Head-to-head goal difference; 4) Head-to-head away goals scored.
(C) Champions; (P) Promoted; (R) Relegated

=== Results ===
Home \ Away	XHE	DOB	DRI	KAM	LJU	NPK	REC	REN	SKE	VRB	VLJ
Djepchishte	—	7–0	4–1	3–3	2–0	3–1	1–5	3–2	5–1	3–0 (Note: Match awarded)	3–3
Dobroshti	1–1	—	3–0	0–3	4–0	4–1	2–3	3–2	3–0	1–4	2–4
Drita 94	1–4	4–2	—	0–3	1–1	3–0	3–1	4–2	2–0	4–3	3–2
Kamjani	1–0	2–1	6–1	—	7–0	3–0	2–1	6–0	3–0	0–2	3–0
Ljuboten	1–7	4–5	2–2	0–3	—	4–3	1–1	1–3	3–1	0–7	0–3
Napredok	1–0	4–2	4–0	1–2	2–0	—	3–0	3–0	4–1	3–1	0–3
Reçica	1–4	2–2	5–2	3–4	4–2	1–1	—	2–1	5–1	2–0	0–2
Renova	2–3	5–2	4–3	2–6	2–2	1–3	4–3	—	3–1	2–3	5–2
Skenderbeu	0–1	1–0	1–0	1–3	3–1	1–6	3–2	0–0	—	1–1	2–2
Vardar (B)	2–3	5–2	3–1	1–3	3–0	3–1	4–2	5–2	3–0	—	0–2
Vëllazërimi J 1977	2–1	8–4	4–2	2–1	3–0	4–1	2–0	6–0	3–0	2–0	—

Source: MacedonianFootball.com
Legend: Blue = home team win; Yellow = draw; Red = away team win.

== Southwest ==
=== Table ===
Pos	Team	Pld	W	D	L	GF	GA	GD	Pts	Promotion or relegation
1	Vllaznimi (C, Q)	17	12	1	4	36	22	+14	37	Qualification to Promotion play-offs
2	Mogila	17	9	5	3	37	22	+15	32	
3	Kravari	17	8	5	4	35	17	+18	29	
4	Karaorman	17	9	1	7	36	27	+9	28	
5	Slavej (R)	17	8	3	6	38	31	+7	27	Withdraw from the league
6	Sv. Troica	17	6	3	8	31	34	−3	21	
7	Demir Hisar	17	5	5	7	32	45	−13	20	
8	Korabi	17	5	3	9	26	39	−13	18	
9	Napredok (N)	17	4	2	11	30	44	−14	14	
10	Veleshta United (Note: Veleshta United were deducted 3 points for not playing the Round 4 match.) (R)	9	1	0	8	8	28	−20	0	Withdraw from the league

Source: MacedonianFootball.com
Rules for classification: 1) Points; 2) Head-to-head points; 3) Head-to-head goal difference; 4) Head-to-head away goals scored.
(C) Champions; (Q) Qualified for the phase indicated; (R) Relegated

=== Results ===
Home \ Away	DEM	KAR	KOR	KRA	MOG	NPN	SLA	SVT	VEL	VLL
Demir Hisar	—	0–4	4–4	0–0	3–3	4–4	3–0	1–0	3–0 (Note: Match awarded)	2–5
Karaorman	7–1	—	4–2	0–0	4–2	3–0	2–1	1–3	3–2	1–2
Korabi	0–3	4–0	—	1–1	3–1	2–1	4–2	1–0	—	0–2
Kravari	3–1	5–0	4–0	—	0–0	4–1	1–2	1–0	—	3–0
Mogila	6–1	1–0	4–0	2–1	—	2–1	1–0	2–2	—	0–0
Napredok (N)	2–2	2–1	3–2	0–3	1–3	—	3–4	1–2	3–0	2–1
Slavej	5–2	0–3	1–1	3–1	2–2	3–2	—	4–4	—	3–0
Sv. Troica	0–1	0–3	4–2	4–4	1–3	3–2	1–5	—	—	3–1
Veleshta United	—	—	3–0	0–3	0–5	—	0–3	0–3	—	—
Vllaznimi	2–1	2–0	2–0	3–1	3–0	5–2	1–0	2–1	5–3	—

Source: MacedonianFootball.com
Legend: Blue = home team win; Yellow = draw; Red = away team win.

== See also ==
- 2025–26 Macedonian Football Cup
- 2025–26 Macedonian First Football League
- 2025–26 Macedonian Second Football League
