= FK Karaorman =

- Full name: Fudbalski klub Karaorman Struga
- Nickname: Паткари (Duck Hunters)
- Founded: 1923; 103 years ago
- Ground: Gradska Plaža Stadium
- Capacity: 800 seats (2000 standing)
- Chairman: Riste Kjuskoski
- Manager: Darko Krsteski
- League: Macedonian Third League (Region 5)
- 2025–26: 4th
Home colours	Away colours

FK Karaorman (Macedonian: ФК Караорман) is a football club from Struga, North Macedonia. They are currently competing in the Macedonian Third League.

== History ==
The club was founded in 1923 under the name Crn Drim, by the advanced Struga youth. Among its creators was famous Macedonian painter, Vangel Kodžoman. After World War II, the club got its current name Karaorman. In their history they have played one season in the Macedonian First League back in 1993–94. Mostly they have competed in the Macedonian Second League, except for a short period when they were a member of the Macedonian Third League Southwest (Lake Region).

Former Macedonia national team player Artim Šakiri started his youth career at the club.

== Current squad ==
As of 20 October 2024.

Note: Flags indicate national team as defined under FIFA eligibility rules; some limited exceptions apply. Players may hold more than one non-FIFA nationality.

No.	Pos.	Nation	Player
2		MKD	Nenad Poposki
3	MF	MKD	Jetmir Bauta
4	MF	MKD	Kliment Filev
5		MKD	Nikola Grdanoski
6		MKD	Aleksandar Cokleski
7	FW	MKD	Ivica Kjeleshoski
8		MKD	Simeon Minoski
9	FW	MKD	Igor Klechkaroski
10	MF	MKD	Cvetan Gligoroski
11		MKD	David Spaseski

No.	Pos.	Nation	Player
13		MKD	Bojan Klechkaroski
14		MKD	Igor Filiposki
16		MKD	Krste Pejchinoski
17	MF	MKD	Hristijan Spiroski
18		MKD	Enel Djemoski
19		MKD	Mishel Kukoski
22		MKD	Hristijan Budinoski
30		MKD	Bojan Caposki
35		MKD	Bojan Krstanoski
99	GK	MKD	Arijon Merko

== Honours ==
(North Macedonia) Macedonian Second League

- Runners-up (3): 1992–93, 1996–97, 1999–2000

== Recent seasons ==
Season	League									Cup
Season	Division	P	W	D	L	F	A	Pts	Pos	Cup
1992–93	2. MFL	38	24	5	9	73	37	53	2nd ↑	
1993–94	1. MFL	30	9	6	15	37	75	24	15th ↓	QF
1994–95	2. MFL West	32	11	5	16	45	67	38	14th	
1995–96	2. MFL West	30	14	2	14	45	39	44	8th	
1996–97	2. MFL West	29	18	3	8	78	36	57	2nd	
1997–98	2. MFL West	30	11	11	8	54	35	44	5th	
1998–99	2. MFL West	30	12	6	12	46	52	42	9th	
1999–00	2. MFL West	34	22	4	18	78	42	70	2nd	PR
2000–01	2. MFL	34	17	4	11	67	41	58	5th	SF
2001–02	2. MFL	34	16	3	15	69	67	51	5th	QF
2002–03	2. MFL	36	11	4	21	45	69	37	16th ↓	R1
2003–04	3. MFL Southwest	?	?	?	?	?	?	?	2nd	R1
2004–05	3. MFL Southwest	26	20	4	2	83	23	64	1st ↑	R1
2005–06	2. MFL	30	15	5	10	47	38	50	3rd	R2
2006–07	2. MFL	33	12	3	18	37	50	39	8th	R1
2007–08	2. MFL	32	8	2	22	23	57	26	16th ↓	PR
2008–09	3. MFL Southwest	?	?	?	?	?	?	?	5th	PR
2009–10	3. MFL Southwest	31	27	1	3	122	27	82	2nd	PR
2010–11	3. MFL Southwest	23	9	2	12	46	39	29	6th	PR
2011–12	3. MFL Southwest	31	16	5	10	71	47	53	3rd	R1
2012–13	3. MFL Southwest	29	19	5	5	77	34	62	3rd	R1
2013–14	3. MFL Southwest	30	17	2	11	84	45	53	4th	R1
2014–15	3. MFL Southwest	22	10	1	11	38	40	31	7th	PR
2015–16	3. MFL Southwest	22	9	0	13	42	50	27	9th	PR
2016–17	3. MFL Southwest	26	7	6	13	46	64	27	13th	PR
2017–18	3. MFL Southwest	24	11	5	8	61	52	38	4th	PR
2018–19	3. MFL Southwest	25	11	3	11	56	46	36	6th	PR
2019–20^{1}	3. MFL Southwest	15	6	2	7	30	30	20	10th	N/A
2020–21^{1}	3. MFL Southwest	19	13	4	2	46	13	43	2nd	PR
2021–22	3. MFL Southwest	22	20	1	1	77	21	61	1st ↑	PR
2022–23	2. MFL	30	9	7	14	30	40	34	11th	R1
2023–24	2. MFL	30	4	3	23	19	71	15	16th ↓	PR
2024–25	3. MFL Southwest	21	10	1	10	35	42	28^{(−3)}	6th	PR
2025–26	3. MFL Southwest	17	9	1	7	36	27	28	4th	PR

^{1}The 2019–20 and 2020–21 seasons were abandoned due to the COVID-19 pandemic in North Macedonia.
