= Ilčo Borov =

Macedonian footballer

Personal information
- Date of birth: 25 July 1966 (age 60)
- Height: 1.77 m (5 ft 10 in)
- Position: Forward

Senior career*
Years	Team	Apps	(Gls)
1994-1996	Sileks		
1997-1998	Pobeda		
2001	Apolonia Fier	10	(2)
2002	Borec		

International career
1994–1996	Macedonia	5	(0)
- * Club domestic league appearances and goals

Ilčo Borov (born 25 July 1966) is a Macedonian retired football striker.

== International career ==
He made his senior debut for Macedonia in a May 1994 friendly match against Albania in Tetovo and has earned a total of 5 caps, scoring no goals. His final international was a June 1996 FIFA World Cup qualification match away against Iceland.
