= Dolno Svilare =

Dolno Svilare Долно Свиларе Sullarë e Poshtme
- Village
- Location within North Macedonia
- Coordinates: 42°02′N 21°17′E
- Country: North Macedonia
- Region: Skopje
- Municipality: Saraj

Population (2021)
  - Total: 2,174
- Time zone: UTC+1 (CET)
  - Summer (DST): UTC+2 (CEST)
- Car plates: SK
- Website: .

Dolno Svilare (Macedonian: Долно Свиларе, Albanian: Sullarë e Poshtme) is a village in the municipality of Saraj, North Macedonia.

== Demographics ==
According to the 2021 census, the village had a total of 2.174 inhabitants. Ethnic groups in the village include:

- Albanians 2.128
- Others 46

Year	Macedonian	Albanian	Turks	Romani	Vlachs	Serbs	Bosniaks	Others	Total
2002	6	1.998	...	...	...	...	...	6	2.010
2021	...	2.128	...	...	...	...	...	46	2.174

== Sports ==
Local football club KF Rinia 98 plays in the Macedonian Third League (North Division).
