= Males (surname) =

Males is a surname with multiple origins. Maleš is a surname in Croatia, Serbia, Bosnia, and Slovenia, while Maleș appears in Romania.

== People ==
=== Males ===
- Carolyn Males (born 1946), American writer
- Danny Males (born 1941), Australian boxer
- Mikael Males (born 1977), Swedish professor of medieval studies
- Mike A. Males (born 1950), American sociologist
- Stephen Males (born 1955), British judge

=== Maleš ===
- Darian Maleš (born 2001), Swiss-Serbian footballer
- Mate Maleš (born 1989), Croatian footballer

=== Maleș ===
- Costin Maleș (born 1969), Romanian footballer
