= Vangel Kodžoman =

Vangel Kodžoman (Macedonian: Вангел Коџоман) (1904, Struga – 1994) was a Macedonian painter.

== Education and career ==
Vangel Kodžoman was born in 1904 in Struga, in the Manastir Vilayet of the Ottoman Empire (present-day North Macedonia). In 1924, he received his high school certificate in Ohrid and then graduated from the Art School in Belgrade in 1928. From 1929 to 1936, he participated in the spring exhibitions of the Belgrade painters, and he took part in the exhibition of the independent painters of Belgrade in 1937. In 1938–45, he taught in the Seventh Boys High School in Belgrade. From 1952 to 1962, he taught painting, methodology and art education at the Teachers College in Skopje. In 1953 Kodzoman, Lazar Licenoski and Nikola Martinoski represented Macedonian art in the Modern Gallery in Zagreb at the grand exhibition "Half a century of Yugoslav painting 1900-1950" . In 1974 in Struga, he opened a permanent exhibition in the memorial home of Vangel Kodzoman. The exhibit consisted of 30 oil paintings and water colours.

== Style of Painting ==
His paintings were created in number of different techniques: oil, aquarelle, water colors and drawings. Struga in the past and Struga of today subjects were his thematic interest and inspiration.

== Accomplishments ==
He was one of the founders of the Association of the Painting Artists of Macedonia (DLUM). In 1974, he opened a thematic exhibition “Struga in the Past” in Struga. He received the highest Macedonian award “11 October” twice.
