= FK Ljuboten =

- Full name: Fudbalski Klub Ljuboten; Фудбалски Клуб Љуботен
- Nicknames: Plavi / Плави ("The Blues")
- Founded: 28 March 1919; 107 years ago
- Ground: AMS Sportski Centar Tetovo
- Capacity: 700
- Chairman: Ilija Despotovski
- Manager: Vladimir Bilbiloski
- League: Macedonian Third League (Region 6)
- 2025–26: 11th
- Website: facebook.com
Home colours	Away colours

Fudbalski Klub Ljuboten (Macedonian: Фудбалски Клуб Љуботен; Albanian: Klubi Futbollit Luboteni) is a football club based in Tetovo, North Macedonia. They are currently competing in the Macedonian Third League (Region 6).

== History ==
Founded in 1919, FK Ljuboten is the oldest club in North Macedonia. FK Ljuboten was based in northern Tetovo, built and supported by the locals. The name was derived from the mountain peak of the Šar Mountains, Ljuboten. Through most of the football period under both the Kingdom and Socialist Yugoslavia, the club relied on local talent and were funded by the locals and the city of Tetovo. For the 100th birthday of the club, they joined the Club of Pioneers.

== Rivalry ==
FK Ljuboten's rival is FK Teteks. The rivalry reflected the social and class differences of the respective club's supporters. Ljuboten's supporters are only the citizens of Tetovo, predominantly of Macedonians. Teteks supporters were the working class, as the club was founded by the Teteks company and had supporters from Macedonians in Tetovo and all around North Macedonia.

== Honours ==
- (North Macedonia) Macedonian Second League
  - Winners (1): 1992–93

== Recent seasons ==
Ljuboten's former logo

Ljuboten's 100 years centenary logo

Season	League									Cup
Season	Division	P	W	D	L	F	A	Pts	Pos	Cup
1992–93	2. MFL	38	22	9	7	72	32	53	1st ↑	
1993–94	1. MFL	30	11	11	8	46	35	30^{(−3)}	5th	QF
1994–95	1. MFL	30	10	4	16	37	54	34	13th	R1
1995–96	1. MFL	28	6	1	21	27	87	19	15th ↓	QF
1996–97	2. MFL West	29	3	0	26	28	84	6^{(−3)}	16th ↓	R1
1997–98	3. MFL North-Polog	?	?	?	?	?	?	?	?	
1998–99	3. MFL North-Polog	?	?	?	?	?	?	?	?	
1999–00	3. MFL North-Polog	?	?	?	?	?	?	?	?	
2000–01	3. MFL North	?	?	?	?	?	?	?	?	
2001–02	3. MFL North	?	?	?	?	?	?	?	?	
2002–03	3. MFL North	?	?	?	?	?	?	?	?	
2003–04	4. OFL Tetovo	?	?	?	?	?	?	?	?	
2004–05	4. OFL Tetovo	?	?	?	?	?	?	?	?	
2005–06	4. OFL Tetovo	?	?	?	?	?	?	?	?	
2006–07	4. OFL Tetovo	?	?	?	?	?	?	?	?	
2007–08	3. MFL West	18	?	?	?	?	?	?	1st	
2008–09	3. MFL West	26	13	6	7	61	39	45	4th	
2009–10	3. MFL West	28	?	?	?	?	?	59	2nd	
2010–11	3. MFL West	23	14	5	4	53	17	44	2nd	
2011–12	3. MFL West	28	19	2	7	64	24	59	3rd	R1
2012–13	3. MFL West	28	13	1	14	58	62	40	8th	R1
2013–14	3. MFL West	FFM expelled Ljuboten from the league							↓	R1
2014–15	4. OFL Tetovo	14	4	1	9	23	37	13	5th	
2015–16	4. OFL Tetovo	18	7	2	9	31	40	23	5th	R1
2016–17	4. OFL Tetovo	14	9	1	4	42	23	28	3rd	R1
2017–18	4. OFL Tetovo	15	13	1	1	43	12	40	1st ↑	
2018–19	3. MFL West	24	9	4	11	42	49	31	6th	
2019–20^{1}	3. MFL West	11	3	1	7	14	20	10	10th	N/A
2020–21^{1}	3. MFL West	13	5	0	8	20	36	15	7th	R1
2021–22	3. MFL West	21	7	3	11	33	46	24	9th	R1
2022–23	3. MFL West	12	4	0	8	15	21	12	4th	R2
2023–24	3. MFL West	20	7	2	11	37	43	23	4th	
2024–25	3. MFL West	24	9	3	12	39	52	30	8th	
2025–26	3. MFL West	20	2	4	24	22	66	10	11th	R1

^{1}The 2019–20 and 2020–21 seasons were abandoned due to the COVID-19 pandemic in North Macedonia.
