= FK Gorno Lisiče =

FK Euromilk Gorno Lisiče
- Full name: Fudbalski Klub Euromilk Gorno Lisiče (in Macedonian)
- Nickname: Млекари (Milkmen)
- Founded: 1960; 66 years ago
- Ground: Stadion Gorno Lisiče
- Capacity: 500
- Chairman: Goran Malishikj
- Manager: Jovan Trajkov
- League: Macedonian Second League
- 2025–26: Third League (North), 1st (promoted)
Home colours	Away colours

FK Euromilk Gorno Lisiče (Macedonian: ФК Еуромилк Горно Лисиче) is a football club from Gorno Lisiče in Skopje, Republic of North Macedonia. They currently play in the Macedonian Second League.

== History ==
The club played its first match in 1940 under the name Lisiče against Lebane from Leskovac. Over the years, the team has used a few different names, first Udarnik and later Bratstvo Edinstvo. For a period of time it also used the name Tehnokom, a firm that saved the club when it was in financial trouble. After the sponsor left only with the help of the Gorno Lisiče citizens, players and club board, it was saved from the brink of extinction.

Today, the club uses the name FK Euromilk Gorno Lisiče and successfully competes in the Macedonian Second League.

== Recent seasons ==
Season	League									Cup
Season	Division	P	W	D	L	F	A	Pts	Pos	Cup
2009–10	3. MFL North	?	?	?	?	?	?	?	1st ↑	PR
2010–11	2. MFL	26	11	2	13	41	49	35	8th	R1
2011–12	2. MFL	30	17	5	8	60	30	56	4th	R1
2012–13	2. MFL	30	19	7	4	47	16	61	4th ↑	R2
2013–14	1. MFL	33	9	12	12	34	37	39	9th ↓	R1
2014–15	2. MFL	27	10	5	12	29	36	35	8th	QF
2015–16	2. MFL	27	9	9	9	26	29	36	7th	R1
2016–17	2. MFL	27	10	5	11	29	29	35	5th	R1
2017–18	2. MFL West	27	10	5	12	32	46	35	7th ↓	PR
2018–19	3. MFL North	26	9	0	17	38	66	24	12th ↓	PR
2019–20^{1}	OFL Kisela Voda	?	?	?	?	?	?	?	3rd	N/A
2020–21^{1}	OFL Kisela Voda	?	?	?	?	?	?	?	1st ↑	PR
2021–22	3. MFL North	The season was not held								PR
2022–23	3. MFL North	29	12	6	11	42	45	42	7th	PR
2023–24	3. MFL North	26	17	5	4	74	25	56	3rd	PR
2024–25	3. MFL North	26	13	3	10	67	51	42	3rd	PR
2025–26	3. MFL North	26	23	1	2	96	21	70	1st ↑	PR

^{1}The 2019–20 and 2020–21 seasons were abandoned due to the COVID-19 pandemic in North Macedonia.

=== Current squad ===
As of 24 November 2025

Note: Flags indicate national team as defined under FIFA eligibility rules; some limited exceptions apply. Players may hold more than one non-FIFA nationality.

No.	Pos.	Nation	Player
1	GK	MKD	Danchevski Danstak Andrej
2	–	MKD	Imer Almir
2	–	MKD	Risteski Marko
2	–	MKD	Ivanovski Luka
3	–	MKD	Nikolovski Pavel
4	–	MKD	Arifi Blerim
5	–	MKD	Ristovski Kiril
6	–	MKD	Zengovski Damjan
7	–	MKD	Bakijov Ahmed
7	–	MKD	Unevski Nikola
8	–	MKD	Janevski Andrej
9	–	MKD	Miftar Orhan
10	–	MKD	Jusufi Fati
11	–	MKD	Pavlovski Tomche
12	GK	MKD	Andov Matej
13	–	MKD	Anchevski Nikola

No.	Pos.	Nation	Player
14	–	MKD	Petrushevski Darko
14	–	MKD	Janev Bojan
15	–	MKD	Radevski Jovica
16	–	MKD	Petrushevski Petar
17	MF	MKD	Peev Oliver
18	–	MKD	Jankuloski Bojan
20	–	MKD	Dimitrov Kristijan
20	–	MKD	Malov Nikola
21	–	MKD	Ismailovski Ferdi
22	MF	MKD	Mitrov Mihailo (captain)
23	MF	MKD	Janevski Matej
24	–	MKD	Boshkovski Andrej
