= FK Borec =

- Full name: Fudbalski klub Borec Veles
- Founded: 1919; 107 years ago
- Ground: Zoran Paunov Stadium
- Capacity: 2,000
- Coordinates: 41°43′10.0″N 21°46′29.7″E
- Chairman: Dimitar Sazdov
- Head coach: Goran Bojcheski
- League: Macedonian Third League (Region 4)
- 2025–26: Macedonian Third League (West), 1st
Home colours	Away colours

FK Borec (Macedonian: ФК Борец) is a football club from Veles, North Macedonia. They currently play in the Macedonian Third League (Region 4).

== History ==
The club was founded in 1919.

FK Borec played in the Macedonian First League from the 1992–93 through the 1994–95 season.

The club was promoted to the First League again following the 1996–97 season.

It has produced many players, among the best are: Zoran Paunov, Ilčo Borov, Panche Stoilov and Panche Kjumbev.

== Supporters ==
The supporters group Gemidžii is named after the anarchistic group who have committed the bombings in Thessaloniki on 1903. Earlier, the fans were known as Vampiri (Vampires).

== Honours ==
- (Socialist Republic of Macedonia) Macedonian Republic League:
  - Winners (1): 1989
- (North Macedonia) Macedonian Second League:
  - Winners (2): 1996–97, 2018–19
  - Runners-up (2): 1995–96, 2017–18
- (North Macedonia) Macedonian Third League:
  - Winners (2): 2012-13, 2023–24
  - Runners-up (1): 2016-17

== Recent seasons ==
Season	League									Cup
Season	Division	P	W	D	L	F	A	Pts	Pos	Cup
1992–93	1. MFL	34	12	8	14	42	43	32	12th	
1993–94	1. MFL	30	9	9	12	31	43	24^{(−3)}	14th	
1994–95	1. MFL	30	9	6	15	28	57	33	15th ↓	
1995–96	2. MFL East	30	19	4	7	61	33	61	2nd	
1996–97	2. MFL East	30	23	5	2	74	24	74	1st ↑	R1
1997–98	1. MFL	25	9	6	10	28	30	33	7th	QF
1998–99	1. MFL	26	8	8	10	31	35	32	8th	
1999–00	1. MFL	26	8	6	12	30	42	30	9th	R1
2000–01	1. MFL	26	4	1	21	18	80	13	13th ↓	R2
2001–02	2. MFL	34	14	5	15	37	36	47	12th	R2
2002–03	2. MFL	36	16	5	15	56	43	53	9th	R2
2003–04	2. MFL	32	13	8	11	50	50	44	11th ↓	R1
2004–05	3. MFL South	?	?	?	?	?	?	?	?	R1
2005–06	3. MFL South	?	?	?	?	?	?	?	?	R1
2006–07	3. MFL South	22	8	3	11	34	43	27	7th	PR
2007–08	3. MFL South	23	13	1	9	56	42	40	3rd	PR
2008–09	3. MFL South	22	7	1	14	23	49	22	9th ↓	PR
2009–10	OFL Veles	?	?	?	?	?	?	?	1st ↑	PR
2010–11	3. MFL South	29	8	4	17	43	70	28	14th	PR
2011–12	3. MFL South	28	5	7	16	37	70	22	13th	PR
2012–13	3. MFL South	30	24	3	3	86	18	75	1st ↑	PR
2013–14	2. MFL	29	4	2	23	29	80	14	15th ↓	R1
2014–15	3. MFL South	21	9	1	11	48	50	28	5th	PR
2015–16	3. MFL South	22	9	3	10	62	32	30	5th	PR
2016–17	3. MFL South	25	20	3	2	93	18	63	2nd ↑	PR
2017–18	2. MFL East	25	16	5	4	43	15	53	2nd	R2
2018–19	2. MFL East	27	21	3	3	63	17	66	1st ↑	R1
2019–20^{1}	1. MFL	23	7	6	10	20	31	27	9th	N/A
2020–21	1. MFL	33	11	7	15	32	36	40	9th	R1
2021–22	1. MFL	33	5	6	22	25	66	21	11th ↓	R2
2022–23	2. MFL	30	0	2	28	13	102	2	16th ↓	R1
2023–24	3. MFL South	20	16	3	1	72	13	51	1st ↑	PR
2024–25	2. MFL	30	4	5	21	22	54	17	15th ↓	R1
2025–26	3. MFL South	23	20	1	2	88	15	61	1st	PR

^{1}The 2019–20 season was abandoned due to the COVID-19 pandemic in North Macedonia.

== Current squad ==
As of 15 February 2025.

Note: Flags indicate national team as defined under FIFA eligibility rules; some limited exceptions apply. Players may hold more than one non-FIFA nationality.

No.	Pos.	Nation	Player
1	GK	MKD	Matej Andov
2	DF	MKD	Bojan Anishikj
4	DF	MKD	Sumer Hasan
5	DF	MKD	Stojan Stojchevski
6	DF	MKD	Ane Tashevski
7	MF	MKD	Stefan Ristovski
8	MF	MKD	Matej Cvetanovski
9	FW	MKD	Bujar Hajdari
10	MF	MKD	Kiril Ivanovski
11	FW	MKD	Josif Manasiev
12	GK	MKD	David Dimitrievski
14	MF	MKD	Stojan Petkovski
16	FW	MKD	Edin Mersovski

No.	Pos.	Nation	Player
17	DF	MKD	Stefan Filipovski
18	FW	MKD	Florent Osmani
19	FW	MKD	Aleks Mitrov
20	MF	MKD	Aleksandar Kostov
22	GK	MKD	Andrej Babunski
23	MF	MKD	Milan Chichevski
40	GK	MKD	Aleksandar Joldashev
44	DF	MKD	Onur Emini
70	DF	MKD	Damjan Zengovski
99	MF	MKD	Matej Panov
—	GK	MKD	Petar Jakimov
—	DF	MKD	Kristijan Jordanovski
