= FK Pčinja 2015 =

FK Pchinja 2015
- Full name: Fudbalski klub Pchinja 2015
- Founded: 1963; 63 years ago
- Ground: Stadion Milko Ilievski
- Capacity: 1,014
- Chairman: Boban Manevski
- Manager: Chaslav Vukanovski & Zoran Kuzevski
- League: Macedonian Third League (Region 2)
- 2025–26: 6th

FK Pchinja 2015 (Macedonian: ФК Пчиња 2015) is a football club based in the village of Pchinja near Kumanovo, North Macedonia. They are currently competing in the Macedonian Third League (Region 2).

== History ==
The club was founded in 1963 under the name Zadrugar. Later in 1968, it received the name Pchinja according to the club's homeplace. Pchinja competes until spring 2001. From the 2001–02 season, the club gets the new name Pchinja 2001. And from the 2007–08 season, the new logo of the club was made, after which Pchinja 2001 became Pchinja Junajted. The color of the home jersey was orange and red in stripes, the shorts are black and the socks were white, and in the away matches Pchinja Junajted competed in a blue jersey, blue shorts and white socks or in a completely white jersey.

In 2015, the club was refounded under the name Pchinja 2015.

Former logo as Pchinja Junajted
