= FK Lokomotiva Gradsko =

Lokomotiva Gradsko
- Full name: Fudbalski klub Lokomotiva Gradsko
- Ground: Stadion Gradsko
- Chairman: Cane Budimov
- Manager: Sashko Panovski
- League: OFS Veles
- 2023–24: Third League (South), 11th (relegated)
Home colours	Away colours

FK Lokomotiva Gradsko (Macedonian: ФК Локомотива Градско) is a football club from Gradsko, North Macedonia. They are currently competing in the OFS Veles league.
