= FK Marena =

Football club in Macedonia

- Full name: Fudbalski klub Marena
- Founded: 1990; 36 years ago
- Ground: Stadion Marena
- League: Macedonian Third League (South)
- 2023–24: 9th
Home colours

FK Marena (Macedonian: ФК Марена) is a football club based in the village of Marena, near Kavadarci, North Macedonia. They are currently competing in the Macedonian Third League (South Division).

== History ==
The club was founded in 1990.
