= KF Arsimi =

Arsimi 1973
- Full name: Фудбалски клуб Арсими 1973; Klubi Futbollistik Arsimi 1973
- Founded: 1973; 53 years ago
- Ground: City Stadium Gostivar
- Capacity: 4,000
- Chairman: Amir Bilalli
- Manager: Vildan Saliu
- League: Macedonian First League
- 2025–26: First League, 6th
- Website: kfarsimi.com
Home colours	Away colours

KF Arsimi 1973 (Macedonian: ФК Арсими, romanized: FK Arsimi 1973) is a football club based in the village of Čegrane near Gostivar, North Macedonia. They are currently competing in the Macedonian First League.

== History ==
The club was founded in 1973.

The club was formed by a group of teachers of that time, with the aim of having a football club in the region where they lived.

The club initially competed in the municipal football league of Macedonia, while later it was included in the third league of the country, a league in which it stayed until the 2021/22 season.

KF Arsimi 1973 had its biggest successes in the 2020/21 and 2021/22 seasons.

In the 2020/21 season, it was declared the runner-up of the Macedonian Third League West, while later in the 2021/22 season it was declared the absolute champion of the Third West League, and won the tie against FK Ovče Pole to be included for the first time in the history of the 50 year of the club in the Macedonian Second League.

At the end of the 2024/05 season, Arsimi Çegran won promotion to compete on highest level of Macedonian football for the first time in its history. As Arsimi's stadium in Čegrane is too small, they've played their home games in Gostivar since their promotion.

== Supporters ==
Their supporters are known as Armata Verdh e Zi.

== Honours ==
- (North Macedonia) Macedonian Second League
  - Runners-up (1): 2024-25
- (North Macedonia) Macedonian Third League
  - Winners (1): 2021-22
  - Runners-up (1): 2020-21

== Current squad ==
As of 1 August 2026

Note: Flags indicate national team as defined under FIFA eligibility rules; some limited exceptions apply. Players may hold more than one non-FIFA nationality.

No.	Pos.	Nation	Player
1	GK	MKD	Eronik Tahiri
2	MF	CRO	Semir Džemaili
3	DF	MKD	Fisnik Zuka
4	MF	MKD	Subi Mustafa
6	DF	MKD	Ajradin Cuculi
7	FW	MKD	Remzifaik Selmani
8	MF	MKD	Mateo Sofijanoski
10	MF	MKD	Argjent Gafuri (captain)
11	FW	MKD	Aljbin Ramadani (vice-captain)
12	GK	MKD	Arsim Ismaili
14	FW	MKD	Shaban Memeti
15	FW	MKD	Fatjon Jusufi
16	DF	MKD	Muhjedin Dardhishta

No.	Pos.	Nation	Player
17	FW	MKD	Lorik Kaba
19	MF	MKD	Shaban Memeti
20	FW	ITA	Salvatore Ribaudo
21	DF	MKD	Arlind Aliti
22	MF	MKD	Gjorgji Doshev
23	DF	MKD	Bashkim Velija
29	MF	NGR	Ibrahim Olaosebikan (on loan from Vardar)
30	FW	COL	Diego Contreras (on loan from Partizani)
34	MF	MKD	Malikj Beljulji
99	GK	MKD	Dejan Siljanovski
—	DF	MKD	Altin Murati
—	MF	MKD	Ramin Alii
—	MF	NGR	Sikiru Olatunbosun

=== Youth players ===
Players from the U19 Youth Team that have been summoned with the first team in the current season.

Note: Flags indicate national team as defined under FIFA eligibility rules; some limited exceptions apply. Players may hold more than one non-FIFA nationality.

No.	Pos.	Nation	Player
41	FW	MKD	Andi Selmani
42	MF	MKD	Vebi Ismaili

No.	Pos.	Nation	Player
88	MF	MKD	Dardan Ademi

=== Current technical staff ===
As of 1 August 2026

Position	Name
Head coach	(North Macedonia) Vildan Saliu
Assistant coach	(North Macedonia) Labinot Musliu
Assistant coach	(North Macedonia) Mite Mitev
Goalkeeper coach	(North Macedonia) Besnik Sadiku
Fitness coach	(North Macedonia) Behar Ukalli
Physiotherapist	(North Macedonia) Neim Pajaziti
Doctor	(North Macedonia) Gent Bilalli
Security person	(North Macedonia) Ardit Xhelili
Administrator	(North Macedonia) Ramadan Saliu
Club representative	(North Macedonia) Albert Jakupi
