= FK Crno Buki ZL =

Crno Buki ZL
- Full name: Fudbalski klub Crno Buki ZL
- Founded: 1960; 65 years ago
- Ground: Stadion Zelena Livada
- Chairman: Todorche Kochishki
- Manager: Naum Ljamchevski
- League: Macedonian Third League (Southwest)
- 2018–19: 3rd

FK Crno Buki ZL (Macedonian: ФК Црно Буки ЗЛ) is a football club based in the village of Crnobuki near Bitola, North Macedonia. They are currently competing in the Macedonian Third League (Southwest Division)

== History ==
The club was founded in 1960.
