= FK Aerodrom =

- Full name: Fudbalski klub Aerodrom
- Founded: 2008; 18 years ago
- Ground: AMS Reonski Centar
- League: Macedonian Third League (Region 1)
- 2025–26: 4th

FK Aerodrom (Macedonian: ФК Аеродром) is a football club based in Skopje, North Macedonia. They are currently competing in the Macedonian Third League (Region 1).

== History ==
The club was founded in 2008 under the name San Siti.
