= KF Rinia 98 =

- Full name: Klubi Futbollistik Rinia 98
- Founded: 1998; 27 years ago
- Ground: Dolno Svilare Stadium
- Chairman: Sefer Isaki
- League: Macedonian Third League (North)
- 2024–25: 12th
Home colours

KF Rinia 98 is a football club based in the village of Dolno Svilare, Saraj Municipality, North Macedonia. They are currently competing in the Macedonian Third League (North Division).
