= FK Bregalnica Delčevo (2012) =

Bregalnica Golak Delčevo
- Full name: Fudbalski klub Bregalnica Golak Delčevo
- Nickname: Брега (Brega)
- Founded: 2012; 14 years ago
- Ground: Gradski stadion Goce Delčev
- Capacity: 4,000
- Chairman: Milcho Petrovski
- Manager: Igor Stamenkovski
- League: Macedonian Third League – Region 3
- 2025–26: 5th
Home colours	Away colours

FK Bregalnica Golak Delčevo (Macedonian: ФК Брегалница Голак Делчево) is a football club based in Delčevo, North Macedonia. They are currently competing in the Macedonian Third League (Region 3).

== History ==
The club was founded in 2012 as Bregalnica Golak, after the dissolution of the club with same name, as no sponsor wanted to help. Legally, the two clubs' track records and honours are kept separate by the Football Federation of North Macedonia.

== Supporters ==
Bregalnica Delčevo supporters are called Aramii.
