= KF Besa Sllupçan =

Besa Sllupçan
- Full name: Klubi Futbollistik Besa Sllupçan
- Founded: 1990; 36 years ago
- Ground: Abdul Medjid Shahini
- Capacity: 10 000
- Chairman: Village club
- Manager: Ibish Demiri
- League: Macedonian Third League (Region 2)
- 2025–26: 10th

KF Besa Sllupçan (Macedonian: ФК Беса, FK Besa) is a football club based in the village of Sllupçan near Kumanovo, North Macedonia. They are currently competing in the Macedonian Third League (Region 2).

== History ==
The club was founded in 1990.
