= KF Vëllazërimi J 1977 =

KF Vëllazërimi J 1977 ФК Влазерими Ј 1977
- Full name: Klubi Futbollistik Vëllazërimi J 1977
- Nickname: The Blues
- Founded: 1977; 49 years ago
- Ground: Vëllazërimi Arena
- Capacity: 3,000
- League: Macedonian Third League (Region 5)
- 2025–26: 2nd

KF Vëllazërimi 77 (Macedonian: ФК Влазерими Ј 1977) is a football club based in Kičevo, North Macedonia. They are currently competing in the Macedonian Third League (Region 5).

== History ==
The club was founded in 1977.
