= FK Prevalec =

- Full name: Fudbalski klub Prevalec Veles
- Founded: 1978; 48 years ago
- Ground: Prevalec Stadium
- Capacity: 500
- Chairman: Dimche Manevski
- League: Macedonian Third League (Region 4)
- 2025–26: 2nd
Home colours	Away colours

FK Prevalec (Macedonian: ФК Превалец) is a football club from Veles, North Macedonia. They are currently competing in the Macedonian Third League (Region 4).

== History ==
The club was founded in 1978 by a group of citizens from Prevalec, a neighborhood in Veles. From that point on the club continuously competes in the OFS Veles regional league and in the last six years in the Macedonian Third League (south region).

== Honours ==
- 6x OFS Veles Champion
- 4x OFS Veles Cup Winners
- 3x Macedonian Third League (South) Vice-Champion
- 3x Macedonian Cup 1/16 Finalist
