= KF Reçica =

- Full name: Futboll Klub Reçica Tetovo
- Founded: 1979; 47 years ago
- Ground: Village Stadium Reçica
- Capacity: 1,000
- Chairman: Abdilkadri Bajrami
- Manager: Redjep Veliu
- League: Macedonian Third League (Region 6)
- 2025–26: 6th
Home colours	Away colours

KF Reçica (Macedonian: ФК Речица, FK Rečica) is a football club based in the village of Reçicë e Madhe, Tetovo, North Macedonia. They are currently competing in the Macedonian Third League (Region 6).

== History ==
The club was founded in 1979.
