= FK Karbinci =

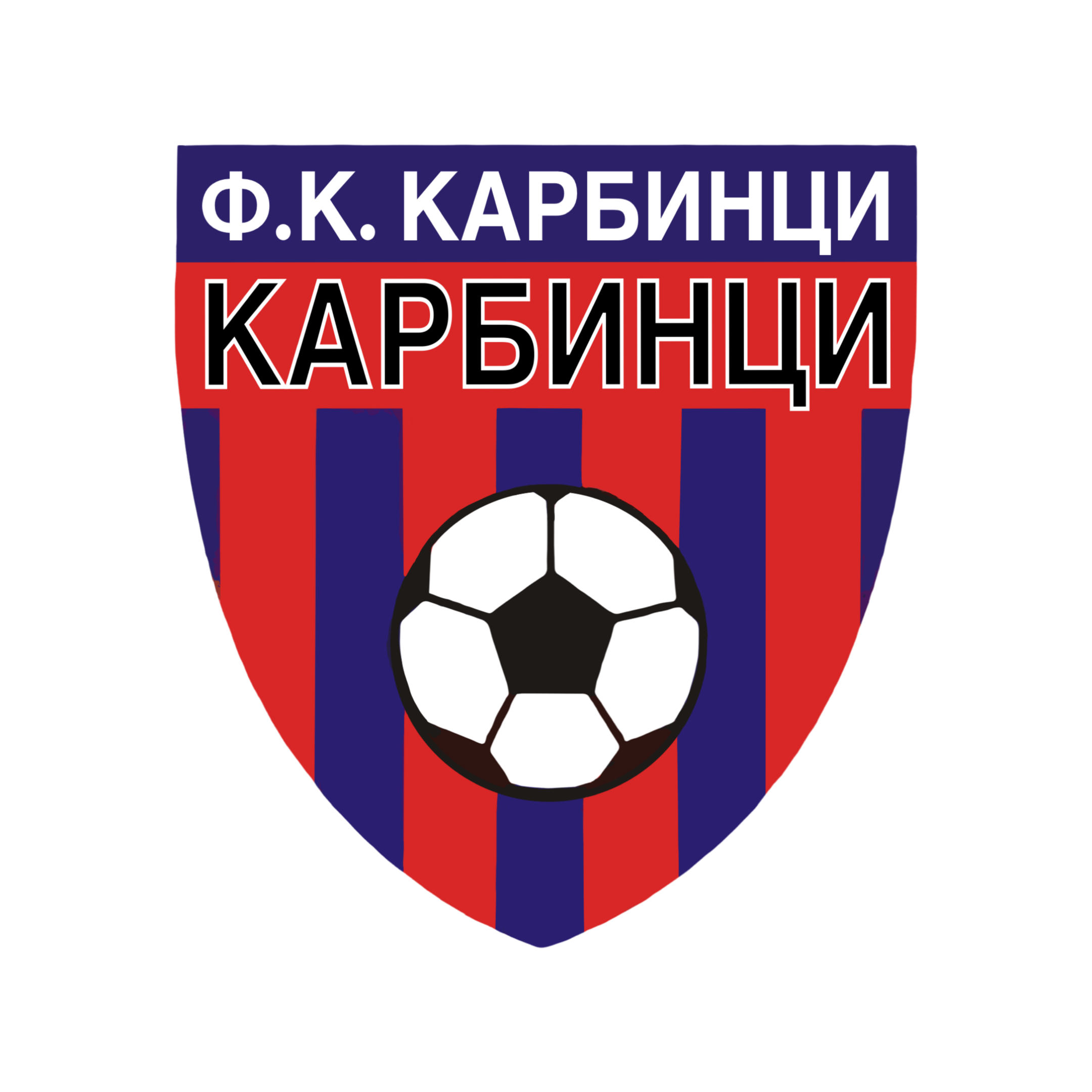
- Full name: Fudbalski Klub Karbinci
- Ground: AMS ground in Karbinci
- Chairman: Joce Velinov
- League: Macedonian Third League (Region 3)
- 2025–26: 6th

FK Karbinci (Macedonian: ФК Карбинци) is a football club based in the village of Karbinci near Štip, Republic of North Macedonia. They currently play in the Macedonian Third League.
