= FK Mladost Krivogaštani =

- Full name: Fudbalski Klub Mladost Krivogaštani
- Founded: 1930
- Ground: Stadion Krivogaštani
- Manager: Trajče Ilioski
- 2025–26: Third League (South), 10th (withdraw)
Home colours

FK Mladost Krivogaštani (Macedonian: ФК Младост Кривогаштани) is a football club based in the village of Krivogaštani near Prilep, North Macedonia. They were recently competed in the Macedonian Third League (South Division).

== History ==
The club was founded in 1930.
