= KF Fortuna 1975 =

- Full name: Klubi Futbollistik Fortuna Hasanbeg-Shkup
- Founded: 1975; 51 years ago
- Ground: Hasanbeg Arena
- Chairman: Raman Ajeti
- League: Macedonian Third League (Region 1)
- 2025–26: 9th

KF Fortuna 1975 (Macedonian: ФК Фортуна Скопје, FK Fortuna Skopje) is a football club based in the Čento neighbourhood of Skopje, North Macedonia. They are currently competing in the Macedonian Third League (Region 1).

== History ==
The club was founded in 1975.
