= KF Kamjani =

- Full name: Klubi Futbollistik Kamjani
- Founded: 1978; 48 years ago
- Ground: Stadion Kamenjani
- Capacity: 899
- Chairman: Arsim Sinani
- Manager: Labinot Musliu
- League: Macedonian Second League
- 2025–26: Third League (West), 1st (promoted)

KF Kamjani (Macedonian: ФК Камјан, FK Kamjan) is a football club based in the village of Kamenjane near Tetovo, North Macedonia. They are currently competing in the Macedonian Third League (West Division).

== History ==
The club was founded in 1978.
