= FK Maleš =

OFK Malesh
- Full name: Omladinski Fudbalski klub Malesh Berovo
- Founded: 1919; 107 years ago
- Ground: Stadion Dimitar Berovski
- Capacity: 500
- League: Macedonian Third League (Region 3)
- 2025–26: 8th
Home colours	Away colours

OFK Malesh (Macedonian: ОФК Малеш) is a football club from Berovo, North Macedonia. They are currently competing in the Macedonian Third League (Region 3).

== History ==
The club was founded in 1919.

It is the second oldest club in the country. The first president and founder of the club was merchant Ilija Kafedzhiski from Berovo, who also bought the first football.
