= 2026–27 Macedonian Third Football League =

Macedonian Third League
- Season: 2026–27

The 2026–27 Macedonian Third Football League is the 35th season of the third-tier football league in North Macedonia, since its establishment. The season began on 12 September 2026 and will be concluded in May 2027.

This is the first season in which is Third League divided to the six regional groups (Region 1, Region 2, Region 3, Region 4, Region 5 and Region 6), instead of five.

== Region 1 ==
=== Participating teams ===
Location of teams in 2026–27 Macedonian Third League Region 1

Club	City / Town	Stadium	Capacity
Aerodrom	Skopje	AMS Reonski Centar	
Bashkimi	Ljuboten	Stadion Butel	
Besa	Saraj	Stadion Ljubin	
BVK Konjare	Sredno Konjari	Stadion Sredno Konjare	
Cool	Skopje	Stadion Cementarnica	1,000
Fortuna	Skopje	Hasanbeg Arena	
Ilinden	Skopje	Stadion Ilinden	1,100
Marino	Marino	Stadion Marino	
New Stars	Skopje	Stadion Mladi Lavovi	500
Perparimi	Nikishtane	Stadion Volkovo	500
R'zhanichino	R'zhanichino	Stadion R’zhanichino	
Studenichan	Studenichani	Stadion Hurdha	

=== Table ===
Pos	Team	Pld	W	D	L	GF	GA	GD	Pts	Promotion or relegation
1	Ilinden	11	11	0	0	58	6	+52	33	Qualification to Promotion play-offs
2	BVK Konjare	11	7	2	2	39	19	+20	23	
3	Aerodrom	11	7	1	3	16	15	+1	22	
4	Studenichan	11	5	3	3	23	18	+5	18	
5	R'zhanichino	11	5	1	5	28	26	+2	16	
6	Besa Saraj	11	4	3	4	23	23	0	15	
7	Fortuna	11	4	3	4	23	27	−4	15	
8	Bashkimi (Lj)	11	3	4	4	23	21	+2	13	
9	Cool	11	3	2	6	23	26	−3	11	
10	Marino	11	3	1	7	19	44	−25	10	
11	New Stars	11	1	4	6	12	16	−4	7	
12	Perparimi	11	1	0	10	6	52	−46	3	

Updated to match(es) played on 22 November 2026. Source: FFM.mk, MacedonianFootball.com
Rules for classification: 1) Points; 2) Head-to-head points; 3) Head-to-head goal difference; 4) Head-to-head away goals scored.

=== Results ===
Home \ Away	AER	BSL	BSA	BVK	COO	FOR	ILI	MAR	NEW	PER	RZH	STU
Aerodrom	—	1–0		3–2	0–6		1–3				2–0	1–2
Bashkimi (Lj)		—	4–3		1–1			6–3	1–1	6–0	0–0	
Besa Saraj	0–2		—		2–0	2–2		4–1	2–0	3–2		
BVK Konjare		3–1	2–2	—				4–1		12–0	5–3	
Cool				0–2	—		0–5	6–2	2–2	3–1		
Fortuna	1–1	5–3		2–6	4–1	—	0–5					3–1
Ilinden		3–0	6–3	5–0			—	14–1			7–1	
Marino	0–2					2–4		—	2–1	2–1		2–2
New Stars	1–2			0–0		0–0	0–2		—			1–3
Perparimi	0–1					2–0	0–6		0–6	—		0–3
R'zhanichino			4–2		2–1	4–2		0–3 (Note: The match was interrupted in the 90+5 minute with a score of 2–3 after a player of R'zhanichino attacked the referee by biting him on the neck. Later, the match was awarded to Marino.)	2–0	10–0	—	
Studenichan		1–1	0–0	2–3	5–3		0–2				4–2	—

Updated to match(es) played on 22 November 2026. Source: FFM.mk, MacedonianFootball.com
Legend: Blue = home team win; Yellow = draw; Red = away team win.

== Region 2 ==
=== Participating teams ===
Location of teams in 2026–27 Macedonian Third League Region 2

Club	City / Town	Stadium	Capacity
Akademija Osogovo	Kriva Palanka	Gradski stadion Kriva Palanka	500
Besa	Slupchane	Abdul Medjid Shahini	
Junior	Dobroshane	Stadion Dobroshane	
Kozjak	Staro Nagorichane	Stadion Kozjak	
Kumanovo	Kumanovo	Stadion Dobroshane	
Likova	Lipkovo	Stadion Ismet Jashari	
Pchinja	Pchinja	Stadion Milko Ilievski	1,014
Pobeda	Tromegja	Stadion Boban Trajkovski	
Rečica	Rechica	Milutin Veljković Uča	100
Vllaznimi	Orizari	Stadion Vaid Saiti	

=== Table ===
Pos	Team	Pld	W	D	L	GF	GA	GD	Pts	Promotion or relegation
1	Kumanovo	9	8	0	1	28	6	+22	24	Qualification to Promotion play-offs
2	Besa Slupchane	9	7	1	1	28	11	+17	22	
3	Pchinja	9	6	1	2	28	12	+16	19	
4	Junior	9	5	1	3	16	18	−2	16	
5	Pobeda (T)	9	3	2	4	14	24	−10	11	
6	Rečica	9	2	4	3	10	13	−3	10	
7	Akademija Osogovo	9	2	3	4	6	12	−6	9	
8	Likova	9	2	1	6	12	20	−8	7	
9	Vllaznimi (O)	9	2	0	7	9	18	−9	6	
10	Kozjak	9	1	1	7	4	21	−17	4	

Updated to match(es) played on 15 November 2026. Source: FFM.mk, MacedonianFootball.com
Rules for classification: 1) Points; 2) Head-to-head points; 3) Head-to-head goal difference; 4) Head-to-head away goals scored.

=== Results ===
Home \ Away	AKO	BES	JUN	KOZ	KUM	LIK	PCH	PTR	REČ	VLO
Akademija Osogovo	—					1–0		1–2	0–0	1–0
Besa Slupchane	3–1	—	3–1	8–0	0–2		6–4			
Junior	2–2		—	1–0	0–3	3–2	2–1			
Kozjak	0–0			—	1–3	0–2	0–2		1–3	
Kumanovo	4–0				—	4–1		6–1	2–0	
Likova		2–3				—	1–3	3–2	1–1	0–3 (Note: The match did not start as the Likova has not acquired a presence of a medical person. Later, the match was awarded to Vllaznimi (O).)
Pchinja	1–0				2–1		—	8–1		6–0
Pobeda (T)		0–0	2–3	2–0				—		2–1
Rečica		0–3	2–3				1–1	2–2	—	1–0
Vllaznimi (O)		1–2	3–1	0–2	1–3					—

Updated to match(es) played on 15 November 2026. Source: FFM.mk, MacedonianFootball.com
Legend: Blue = home team win; Yellow = draw; Red = away team win.

== Region 3 ==
=== Participating teams ===
Location of teams in 2026–27 Macedonian Third League Region 3

Club	City / Town	Stadium	Capacity
Bregalnica 1926	Delchevo	Gradski stadion Goce Delchev	4,000
Dojransko Ezero	Nov Dojran	Sportski Centar Istatov	500
Horizont	Turnovo	Stadion Kukush	1,500
Karbinci	Karbinci	AMS Karbinci	
Malesh	Berovo	Stadion Dimitar Berovski	500
Ograzhden	Novo Selo	Stadion Novo Selo	
Ovche Pole	Sveti Nikole	Gradski stadion Sveti Nikole	
Pobeda	Valandovo	Gradski stadion Valandovo	500
Sasa	Makedonska Kamenica	Gradski stadion M. Kamenica	5,000
Sloga 1934	Vinica	Gradski stadion Vinica	3,000
Tiverija	Strumica	Stadion Blagoj Istatov	6,500
Udarnik	Pirava	Stadion Gjorge Djonov	

=== Table ===
Pos	Team	Pld	W	D	L	GF	GA	GD	Pts	Promotion or relegation
1	Pobeda Valandovo	9	7	2	0	17	3	+14	23	Qualification to Promotion play-offs
2	Sasa	10	6	4	0	26	8	+18	22	
3	Ograzhden	10	6	1	3	11	10	+1	19	
4	Ovche Pole	10	5	3	2	26	12	+14	18	
5	Malesh	9	5	3	1	18	9	+9	18	
6	Horizont Turnovo	10	3	4	3	15	15	0	13	
7	Udarnik	10	3	2	5	15	15	0	11	
8	Dojransko Ezero	10	2	4	4	15	18	−3	10	
9	Bregalnica 1926	10	3	1	6	14	30	−16	10	
10	Sloga 1934	10	1	2	7	7	18	−11	5	
11	Karbinci	10	0	0	10	7	33	−26	0	
12	Tiverija (Note: Tiverija were deducted 6 points and were excluded from the league after 5th round due to not showing for the two matches.) (R)	0	0	0	0	0	0	0	−6	Withdraw from the league

Updated to match(es) played on 22 November 2026. Source: FFM.mk, MacedonianFootball.com
Rules for classification: 1) Points; 2) Head-to-head points; 3) Head-to-head goal difference; 4) Head-to-head away goals scored.
(R) Relegated

=== Results ===
Home \ Away	BRE	DOJ	TUR	KRB	MAL	OGR	OVC	PVA	SAS	SLO	TIV	UDA
Bregalnica 1926	—		3–3			2–3	1–4		2–6	1–0	—	
Dojransko Ezero	1–2	—	2–2				1–1		0–3	2–2	—	
Horizont Turnovo			—	4–1	1–1	0–1		0–1			—	1–1
Karbinci	0–1	0–4		—			2–8		0–2	1–2	—	
Malesh	2–0	3–2		4–2	—				0–0		—	4–1
Ograzhden		3–0		1–0	1–0	—		0–1			—	1–0
Ovche Pole			1–2		1–1	3–0	—	0–1		4–1	—	
Pobeda Valandovo	6–0	1–1		3–0				—			—	2–1
Sasa			4–1			4–1	2–2	1–1	—	4–1	—	
Sloga 1934			0–1		1–3	0–0		0–1		—	—	0–1
Tiverija	—	—	—	—	—	—	—	—	—	—	—	—
Udarnik	5–2	1–2		4–1			1–2		0–0		—	—

Updated to match(es) played on 22 November 2026. Source: FFM.mk, MacedonianFootball.com
Legend: Blue = home team win; Yellow = draw; Red = away team win.

== Region 4 ==
=== Participating teams ===
Location of teams in 2026–27 Macedonian Third League Region 4

Club	City / Town	Stadium	Capacity
Bashkimi	Gorno Jabolchishte	Stadion Prevalec	500
Borec	Veles	Stadion Zoran Paunov	2,000
Buchin	Buchin	Stadion Buchin	
Golemo Konjari	Golemo Konjari	Stadion Golemo Konjari	300
Mlekar	Malo Konjari	Stadion Malo Konjari	
Pitu Guli	Krushevo	Stadion Ezero	
Pobeda	Pepelishte	Maco Arena	
Pobeda	Prilep	Stadion Goce Delchev	15,000
Prevalec	Veles	Stadion Prevalec	500
Rosoman 83	Rosoman	Stadion Rosoman	
Ultras	Prilep	AMS Prilep	
Vardar	Negotino	Cvaj Arena	1,500
Venec	Dolni Disan	Stadion Livadishte	
Vlaznimi Junior	Presil	Stadion Malo Konjari	

=== Table ===
Pos	Team	Pld	W	D	L	GF	GA	GD	Pts	Promotion or relegation
1	Pobeda	11	10	1	0	59	2	+57	31	Qualification to Promotion play-offs
2	Borec	11	6	4	1	46	13	+33	22	
3	Golemo Konjari	11	7	1	3	25	18	+7	22	
4	Venec	11	5	4	2	28	12	+16	19	
5	Pitu Guli	11	6	1	4	29	21	+8	19	
6	Buchin	11	4	3	4	22	32	−10	15	
7	Pobeda (Pe)	11	4	2	5	17	39	−22	14	
8	Bashkimi (GJ)	11	3	4	4	14	15	−1	13	
9	Vardar Negotino	11	3	4	4	26	29	−3	13	
10	Ultras	11	4	1	6	25	30	−5	13	
11	Rosoman 83	11	3	3	5	16	18	−2	12	
12	Prevalec	11	3	2	6	16	31	−15	11	
13	Mlekar	11	2	1	8	8	42	−34	7	
14	Vlaznimi Junior	11	0	3	8	21	50	−29	3	

Updated to match(es) played on 22 November 2026. Source: FFM.mk, MacedonianFootball.com
Rules for classification: 1) Points; 2) Head-to-head points; 3) Head-to-head goal difference; 4) Head-to-head away goals scored.

=== Results ===
Home \ Away	BGJ	BOR	BUC	GKO	MLE	PIT	PPE	POB	PRV	ROS	ULT	VRN	VEN	VLP
Bashkimi (GJ)	—				4–1		1–2	0–1				3–1	0–0	
Borec	1–1	—		3–1	7–0				7–2	0–0				10–0
Buchin		2–2	—	3–2				1–7	1–1		1–3	6–3		
Golemo Konjari	2–0			—			6–2		3–0	3–0			1–0	3–3
Mlekar			1–0		—	0–3		0–7				2–2	1–6	
Pitu Guli	4–0	1–3				—				3–0	2–2			6–3
Pobeda (Pe)		0–11	2–3			3–0	—	0–8	2–1			1–1		
Pobeda		4–0		6–0		5–0		—	6–0		5–1			10–0
Prevalec	1–1				3–0	0–5			—		3–0	1–3		
Rosoman 83	0–0		1–2		3–1		4–0			—			2–0	
Ultras	2–4			0–2	6–0					2–0	—			5–3
Vardar Negotino		2–2		1–2		3–4				4–3	4–3	—		
Venec			9–2			2–1	1–1	0–0			6–1	2–2	—	
Vlaznimi Junior			1–1		1–2		3–4		3–4	3–3			1–2	—

Updated to match(es) played on 22 November 2026. Source: FFM.mk, MacedonianFootball.com
Legend: Blue = home team win; Yellow = draw; Red = away team win.

== Region 5 ==
=== Participating teams ===
Location of teams in 2026–27 Macedonian Third League Region 5

Club	City / Town	Stadium	Capacity
Bair Krkardash	Bitola	Stadion Logovardi	1,000
Chardak	Velgoshti	SRC Biljanini Izvori Ar. Grass	
Demir Hisar	Demir Hisar	Stadion Valentin Stefanovski	350
Karaorman	Struga	Stadion Gradska Plazha	2,000
Kravari	Kravari	Stadion Kravari	500
Kroschu	Bitola	Stadion Kravari	500
Mogila	Mogila	Dimche Sarvanov "Mogilcheto"	
Napredok	Kichevo	Gradski stadion Kichevo	5,000
Napredok	Noshpal	Stadion Noshpal	
Prespa	Resen	Gradski stadion Resen	2,000
Sv. Troica	Ohrid	Stadion Sv. Troica	
Vëllazërimi J 1977	Kichevo	Vëllazërimi Arena	3,000
Vllaznimi	Struga	Stadion Plitishta	

=== Table ===
Pos	Team	Pld	W	D	L	GF	GA	GD	Pts	Promotion or relegation
1	Vëllazërimi J 1977	10	7	2	1	29	15	+14	23	Qualification to Promotion play-offs
2	Karaorman	10	7	1	2	34	20	+14	22	
3	Kravari	10	7	0	3	40	17	+23	21	
4	Sv. Troica	10	6	2	2	27	12	+15	20	
5	Mogila	10	5	2	3	19	14	+5	17	
6	Napredok	11	5	2	4	21	17	+4	17	
7	Kroschu	10	4	2	4	13	20	−7	14	
8	Bair Krkardash	10	4	1	5	21	27	−6	13	
9	Prespa	11	2	4	5	17	23	−6	10	
10	Vllaznimi	10	3	0	7	17	41	−24	9	
11	Demir Hisar	10	2	1	7	22	31	−9	7	
12	Napredok (N)	9	2	1	6	12	21	−9	7	
13	Chardak	9	2	0	7	12	26	−14	6	

Updated to match(es) played on 22 November 2026. Source: FFM.mk, MacedonianFootball.com
Rules for classification: 1) Points; 2) Head-to-head points; 3) Head-to-head goal difference; 4) Head-to-head away goals scored.

=== Results ===
Home \ Away	BAI	CHA	DEM	KAR	KRA	KRO	MOG	NPK	NPN	PRE	SVT	VLJ	VLL
Bair Krkardash	—					2–2			4–5	3–2	0–4	2–4	3–2
Chardak		—				0–1		1–2			1–2		
Demir Hisar		2–4	—	4–4	3–4		1–2					2–5	
Karaorman	3–0			—	3–1		5–3	2–1					3–2
Kravari	2–3	6–0			—			3–1			4–0		9–2
Kroschu			0–3		1–7	—	1–0			2–1		2–3	
Mogila	0–3 (Note: The match was abandoned in the 82nd minute with a score of 1–1 as the Mogila's captain attacked the referee with his teammates following in the attack. Later, the match was awarded to Bair Krkardash.)	3–0					—	4–0	1–0				
Napredok	3–1		4–1			0–0		—	2–1		1–2		5–0
Napredok (N)			1–5	2–0		1–2			—	0–0		2–3	
Prespa		0–4		3–2	1–2		3–3	2–2		—		3–0	
Sv. Troica			5–0	2–3					4–0	2–2	—	1–1	5–0
Vëllazërimi J 1977		7–1			3–2		0–0			3–0		—	
Vllaznimi		3–1	2–1	2–9		3–2	1–3						—

Updated to match(es) played on 22 November 2026. Source: FFM.mk, MacedonianFootball.com
Legend: Blue = home team win; Yellow = draw; Red = away team win.

== Region 6 ==
=== Participating teams ===
Location of teams in 2026–27 Macedonian Third League Region 6

Club	City / Town	Stadium	Capacity
Cetinska	Tetovo	Stadion AMS Tetovo	700
Djepchishte	Djepchishte	Stadion Renova	
Dobroshti	Dobroshte	Stadion Dobrosht	
Drita 94	Bogovinje	Stadion Bogovinje	500
Gostivar	Gostivar	Gradski stadion Gostivar	1,000
Gradec	Gradec	Stadion Gradec	
Jehona 96	Prshovce	AMS Tearce	
Korabi	Debar	Gradski stadion Debar	1,000
Liria	Zhelino	Stadion Zhelino	
Ljuboten	Tetovo	Stadion AMS Tetovo	700
Reçica	Golema Rechica	Stadion Rechica	1,000
Skenderbeu	Poroj	Stadion Poroj	
Vardar	Brvenica	Stadion Brvenica	

=== Table ===
Pos	Team	Pld	W	D	L	GF	GA	GD	Pts	Promotion or relegation
1	Drita 94	11	10	1	0	35	8	+27	31	Qualification to Promotion play-offs
2	Dobroshti	10	8	1	1	24	13	+11	25	
3	Gostivari	12	7	3	2	27	8	+19	24	
4	Liria (Zh)	11	6	3	2	34	18	+16	21	
5	Cetinska	11	5	2	4	26	15	+11	17	
6	Reçica	11	5	1	5	25	27	−2	16	
7	Djepchishte	11	4	2	5	23	23	0	14	
8	Skenderbeu	11	3	4	4	21	21	0	13	
9	Vardar (B)	11	4	1	6	29	30	−1	13	
10	Korabi	11	3	2	6	21	22	−1	11	
11	Jehona 96	10	3	1	6	17	42	−25	10	
12	Ljuboten	11	1	1	9	15	35	−20	4	
13	Gradec	11	1	0	10	20	55	−35	3	

Updated to match(es) played on 22 November 2026. Source: FFM.mk, MacedonianFootball.com
Rules for classification: 1) Points; 2) Head-to-head points; 3) Head-to-head goal difference; 4) Head-to-head away goals scored.

=== Results ===
Home \ Away	CET	XHE	DOB	DRI	GOS	GRA	JEH	KOR	LIR	LJU	REC	SKE	VRB
Cetinska	—	4–1	0–1						3–1	6–1	3–1		4–1
Djepchishte		—		0–2			5–0	1–1		4–2			5–0
Dobroshti		4–1	—							3–1		0–0	3–2
Drita 94	1–0			—	1–0	2–0	7–1	4–1	2–2				
Gostivari	1–0	0–0	3–0		—				2–2		2–1		3–1
Gradec		1–4	3–5		0–6	—			3–6		4–5		
Jehona 96	3–3				0–7	0–3	—	5–3	3–5				
Korabi	2–1		1–3		1–0	9–0		—			1–2		
Liria (Zh)		6–0	1–2						—	3–0	2–0	1–1	5–2
Ljuboten				1–4	1–2	6–3	0–1	2–2		—		1–2	
Reçica		3–2	1–3	1–5						5–0	—	3–2	3–3
Skenderbeu	2–2			1–5	1–1	5–0	3–4	2–0				—	
Vardar (B)				1–2		7–3	6–0	2–0				4–2	—

Updated to match(es) played on 22 November 2026. Source: FFM.mk, MacedonianFootball.com
Legend: Blue = home team win; Yellow = draw; Red = away team win.

== See also ==
- 2026–27 Macedonian Football Cup
- 2026–27 Macedonian First Football League
- 2026–27 Macedonian Second Football League
