= 2010–11 Macedonian Third Football League =

Macedonian Third League
- Season: 2010–11

The 2010–11 Macedonian Third Football League was the 19th season of the third-tier football league in the Republic of Macedonia, since its establishment. It began in August 2010 and ended in May 2011.

== North ==
=== Group A ===
==== League table ====
Pos	Team	Pld	W	D	L	GF	GA	GD	Pts	Promotion or relegation
1	Treska (C, P)	21	15	1	5	61	25	+36	46	Qualification to Promotion play-off
2	Alumina	22	12	4	6	47	19	+28	40	
3	Drachevo	21	10	4	7	39	29	+10	34	
4	Butel	21	11	1	9	40	32	+8	34	
5	Lepenec (R)	21	8	5	8	45	46	−1	29	Withdraw from the league
6	Slavija	21	8	4	9	36	33	+3	28	
7	SSK Mladinec (R)	22	8	4	10	40	55	−15	28	Withdraw from the league
8	Volkovo (R)	22	8	3	11	41	52	−11	27	Withdraw from the league
9	Besa Slupchane	19	8	1	10	36	36	0	25	
10	San Siti	20	7	3	10	31	44	−13	24	
11	Shkëndija Arachinovo	19	8	0	11	35	49	−14	24	
12	Bratstvo Ljubin (R)	21	6	2	13	21	58	−37	20	Relegation to Macedonian Municipal Leagues

Source: MakFudbal.com
Rules for classification: 1) Points; 2) Head-to-head points; 3) Head-to-head goal difference; 4) Head-to-head away goals scored.
(C) Champions; (P) Promoted; (R) Relegated

=== Group B ===
==== League table ====
Pos	Team	Pld	W	D	L	GF	GA	GD	Pts	Promotion or relegation
1	Madjari Solidarnost (C)	19	15	1	3	55	15	+40	46	Qualification to Promotion play-off
2	Marino	18	13	3	2	40	16	+24	42	
3	Rashtak	19	13	3	3	39	20	+19	42	
4	Ilinden	19	10	1	8	33	29	+4	31	
5	Fortuna	19	9	2	8	28	34	−6	29	
6	Kadino	19	8	2	9	30	32	−2	26	
7	Bunardjik	18	6	4	8	41	40	+1	22	
8	Karposh 93	19	4	6	9	26	39	−13	18	
9	Rechica	18	3	2	13	23	41	−18	11	Relegation to Macedonian Municipal Leagues
10	Milano (Note: Milano has been deducted 3 points.) (R)	18	3	3	12	27	51	−24	9	Relegation to Macedonian Municipal Leagues
11	Bistrica (Note: Bistrica were withdraw from the league after Round 10 due to financial reasons.) (R)	10	0	1	9	2	27	−25	1	Withdraw from the league

Source: MakFudbal.com
Rules for classification: 1) Points; 2) Head-to-head points; 3) Head-to-head goal difference; 4) Head-to-head away goals scored.
(C) Champions; (R) Relegated

=== Promotion play-off ===
Team 1	Score	Team 2
Treska	2–0	Madjari Solidarnost

Source: MacedonianFootball.com

== South ==
=== League table ===
Pos	Team	Pld	W	D	L	GF	GA	GD	Pts	Promotion or relegation
1	Pobeda Junior (Note: Pobeda Junior in the first half of the season competed as Viktorija.) (C, P)	29	26	3	0	97	16	+81	81	Promotion to Macedonian Second League
2	Babuna	29	23	3	3	85	23	+62	72	
3	Mladost Krivogashtani	29	19	4	6	73	36	+37	61	
4	Kozhuf	29	16	2	11	49	36	+13	50	
5	Vardarski (R)	29	15	2	12	65	46	+19	47	Withdraw from the league
6	Partizan Obrshani	29	12	5	12	65	62	+3	41	
7	Korzo	29	11	6	12	44	54	−10	39	
8	Vardar Negotino	29	12	2	15	53	70	−17	38	
9	Crna Reka	29	9	3	17	49	70	−21	30	
10	Golemo Konjari	29	10	3	16	47	51	−4	33	
11	Ilinden Bashino	29	10	3	16	35	60	−25	33	
12	Prevalec	29	9	3	17	49	70	−21	30	
13	Mlekar	29	9	3	17	51	77	−26	30	
14	Borec	29	8	4	17	43	70	−27	28	
15	Dojransko Ezero (Note: Dojransko Ezero has been deducted 6 points.) (R)	29	10	1	18	44	63	−19	25	Relegation to Macedonian Municipal Leagues
16	Veles Tabak (Note: Veles Tabak were withdraw from the league after Round 15 due to financial reasons.) (R)	15	1	1	13	11	57	−46	4	Withdraw from the league

Source: Prevalec Facebook (archived)
Rules for classification: 1) Points; 2) Head-to-head points; 3) Head-to-head goal difference; 4) Head-to-head away goals scored.
(C) Champions; (P) Promoted; (R) Relegated

== East ==
=== League table ===
Pos	Team	Pld	W	D	L	GF	GA	GD	Pts	Promotion or relegation
1	Osogovo (C, P)	25	20	3	2	82	20	+62	63	Promotion to Macedonian Second League
2	Babi	25	17	2	6	56	27	+29	53	
3	Tiverija	25	16	3	6	59	30	+29	51	
4	Bregalnica Delchevo	25	14	5	6	55	29	+26	47	
5	Rudar	25	11	3	11	48	43	+5	36	
6	Astibo	25	11	3	11	48	46	+2	36	
7	Sasa	25	10	5	10	38	39	−1	35	
8	Vasilevo	25	10	2	13	46	57	−11	32	
9	Plachkovica	25	9	4	12	39	42	−3	31	
10	Zrnovka	25	9	4	12	41	50	−9	31	
11	Karbinci	25	8	4	13	50	66	−16	28	
12	Cheshinovo	25	6	6	13	42	59	−17	24	
13	Malesh	25	6	1	18	41	75	−34	19	
14	Birlik Konche (Note: Birlik Konche were withdraw from the league after Round 13 due to financial reasons.) (R)	13	0	0	13	12	74	−62	0	Withdraw from the league

Source: MacedonianFootball.com
Rules for classification: 1) Points; 2) Head-to-head points; 3) Head-to-head goal difference; 4) Head-to-head away goals scored.
(C) Champions; (P) Promoted; (R) Relegated

== West ==
=== League table ===
Pos	Team	Pld	W	D	L	GF	GA	GD	Pts	Promotion or relegation
1	Rufeja (C, P)	23	20	2	1	73	19	+54	62	Promotion to Macedonian Second League
2	Ljuboten (Note: Ljuboten has been deducted 3 points.)	23	14	5	4	53	17	+36	44	
3	Gradec	23	13	4	6	59	36	+23	43	
4	Rechica	22	10	2	10	37	40	−3	32	
5	Rinia Negotino	21	9	4	8	33	38	−5	31	
6	Liria Zhelino	23	9	2	12	37	41	−4	29	
7	Rinia Chajle (R)	23	9	2	12	32	48	−16	29	Withdraw from the league
8	Vardari Forino	22	7	6	9	44	40	+4	27	
9	Arsimi	22	8	2	12	30	41	−11	26	
10	Flamurtari	22	8	1	13	32	48	−16	25	
11	Goce Delchev Drugovo	21	6	2	13	34	51	−17	20	
12	Zajazi	21	4	1	16	24	64	−40	13	
13	Sharri Tetovo (Note: Shar Tetovo has been deducted 3 points, then withdraw from the league after Round 12 due to financial reasons.) (R)	12	5	1	6	17	22	−5	13	Withdraw from the league

Source: MakFudbal.com
Rules for classification: 1) Points; 2) Head-to-head points; 3) Head-to-head goal difference; 4) Head-to-head away goals scored.
(C) Champions; (P) Promoted; (R) Relegated

== Southwest ==
=== League table ===
Pos	Team	Pld	W	D	L	GF	GA	GD	Pts	Promotion or relegation
1	Korabi (C, P)	23	18	3	2	70	24	+46	57	Promotion to Macedonian Second League
2	Kravari	23	17	0	6	66	30	+36	51	
3	Podmochani	23	16	2	5	54	23	+31	50	
4	Leshani	23	10	4	9	48	45	+3	34	
5	Veleshta	23	11	0	12	45	57	−12	33	
6	Karaorman	23	9	2	12	46	39	+7	29	
7	Pitu Guli	23	8	5	10	38	65	−27	29	
8	Vardino	23	8	3	12	42	40	+2	27	
9	Dobrushevo	23	7	5	11	47	49	−2	26	
10	Prespa	22	8	2	12	35	46	−11	26	
11	Mogila	22	6	3	13	31	57	−26	21	
12	Bair Krkardash (Note: Bair Krkardash were withdraw from the league after Round 12 due to financial reasons.) (R)	12	5	3	4	27	23	+4	18	Withdraw from the league
13	Mladost Gorno Orizari (R)	23	2	4	17	20	71	−51	10	Relegation to Macedonian Municipal Leagues

Source: MacedonianFootball.com
Rules for classification: 1) Points; 2) Head-to-head points; 3) Head-to-head goal difference; 4) Head-to-head away goals scored.
(C) Champions; (P) Promoted; (R) Relegated

== See also ==
- 2010–11 Macedonian Football Cup
- 2010–11 Macedonian First Football League
- 2010–11 Macedonian Second Football League
