= 1998–99 Macedonian Second Football League =

Macedonian Second League
- Season: 1998–99
- Champions: Kumanovo (East); Napredok (West)
- Promoted: Kumanovo; Napredok
- Relegated: Gaber; Besa Slupchane; Demir Hisar; Vlaznimi; Svetlost

The 1998–99 Macedonian Second Football League was the seventh season since its establishment. It began in August 1998 and ended in May 1999.

== East ==
=== Participating teams ===
Location of teams in 1998–99 Macedonian Second League - East

Club	City
Bashkimi	Kumanovo
Belasica	Strumica
Besa	Slupchane
Bregalnica Delchevo	Delchevo
Bregalnica Shtip	Shtip
Gaber	Vatasha
Jaka	Radovish
Kozhuf	Gevgelija
Kumanovo	Kumanovo
Malesh	Berovo
Metalurg	Veles
Ovche Pole	Sveti Nikole
Sloga	Vinica
Tiverija	Strumica
Udarnik	Pirava
Vardar	Negotino

=== League standing ===
Pos	Team	Pld	W	D	L	GF	GA	GD	Pts	Promotion or relegation
1	Kumanovo (C, P)	29	24	4	1	83	24	+59	76	Promotion to Macedonian First League
2	Belasica	29	19	2	8	58	30	+28	59	
3	Bashkimi	29	14	8	7	55	36	+19	50	
4	Malesh	29	13	7	9	68	41	+27	46	
5	Vardar Negotino	29	14	3	12	63	43	+20	45	
6	Metalurg Veles (Note: Metalurg Veles, Gaber and Besa Slupchane were deducted three points.)	29	13	5	11	50	38	+12	41	
7	Jaka Radovish	29	12	4	13	53	41	+12	40	
8	Bregalnica Shtip (Note: Bregalnica Shtip was deducted nine points.)	29	14	5	10	38	31	+7	38	
9	Sloga Vinica	29	11	5	13	49	50	−1	38	
10	Bregalnica Delchevo	29	10	6	13	45	41	+4	36	
11	Kozhuf	29	11	3	15	52	67	−15	36	
12	Tiverija	29	10	5	14	52	58	−6	35	
13	Udarnik	29	10	5	14	42	66	−24	35	
14	Ovche Pole	29	8	4	17	30	66	−36	28	
15	Gaber (R)	15	5	1	9	15	34	−19	13	Withdrew from the competition
16	Besa Slupchane (R)	29	2	3	24	32	119	−87	6	Relegation to Macedonian Third League

Source: MacedonianFootball.com
Rules for classification: 1) Points; 2) Head-to-head points; 3) Head-to-head goal difference; 4) Head-to-head away goals scored
(C) Champions; (P) Promoted; (R) Relegated

== West ==
=== Participating teams ===
Location of teams in 1998–99 Macedonian Second League - West

Club	City
Alumina	Skopje
Demir Hisar	Demir Hisar
Gostivar	Gostivar
Jugohrom	Jegunovce
Karaorman	Struga
Korab	Debar
Napredok	Kichevo
Novaci	Novaci
Ohrid	Ohrid
Prespa	Resen
Shkëndija Arachinovo	Arachinovo
Shkëndija Tetovo	Tetovo
Svetlost	Kukurechani
Teteks	Tetovo
Veleshta	Veleshta
Vlaznimi	Struga

=== League standing ===
Pos	Team	Pld	W	D	L	GF	GA	GD	Pts	Promotion or relegation
1	Napredok (C, P)	30	21	6	3	65	21	+44	69	Promotion to Macedonian First League
2	Teteks	30	19	5	6	69	30	+39	62	
3	Ohrid	30	15	5	10	58	32	+26	50	
4	Alumina	30	13	5	12	52	41	+11	44	
5	Shkëndija Arachinovo	30	14	2	14	48	50	−2	44	
6	Veleshta	30	13	4	13	51	50	+1	43	
7	Shkëndija HB	30	12	6	12	72	45	+27	42	
8	Jugohrom	30	13	3	14	52	42	+10	42	
9	Karaorman	30	12	6	12	46	52	−6	42	
10	Novaci	30	12	5	13	30	34	−4	41	
11	Korab	30	12	5	13	36	52	−16	41	
12	Prespa	30	11	5	14	47	56	−9	38	
13	Gostivar (Note: Gostivar was deducted three points.)	30	12	4	14	45	64	−19	37	
14	Demir Hisar (R)	30	8	6	16	36	55	−19	30	Relegation to Macedonian Third League
15	Vlaznimi (R)	30	8	5	17	41	71	−30	29	Relegation to Macedonian Third League
16	Svetlost (R)	30	7	4	19	26	79	−53	25	Relegation to Macedonian Third League

Source: MacedonianFootball.com
Rules for classification: 1) Points; 2) Head-to-head points; 3) Head-to-head goal difference; 4) Head-to-head away goals scored
(C) Champions; (P) Promoted; (R) Relegated

== See also ==
- 1998–99 Macedonian Football Cup
- 1998–99 Macedonian First Football League
