= 1993–94 Macedonian Second Football League =

Macedonian Second League
- Season: 1993–94
- Champions: Kozhuf (East); Ohrid (West)
- Promoted: Kozhuf; Ohrid
- Relegated: Bratstvo Golemo Konjari; Tiverija; Gorno Lisiche

The 1993–94 Macedonian Second Football League was the second season since its establishment. It began in August 1993 and ended in June 1994.

== East ==
=== Participating teams ===
Location of teams in 1993–94 Macedonian Second League - East

Club	City
Bratstvo	Golemo Konjari
Bregalnica Delchevo	Delchevo
Bregalnica Shtip	Shtip
Dojransko Ezero	Nov Dojran
Kozhuf	Gevgelija
Kumanovo	Kumanovo
Metalurg	Titov Veles
Pobeda	Valandovo
Prvi Partizan	Turnovo
Sloga	Vinica
Tiverija Skanmak	Strumica
Udarnik	Pirava
Vardarski	Bogdanci
Varosh	Prilep

=== League standing ===
Pos	Team	Pld	W	D	L	GF	GA	GD	Pts	Promotion or relegation
1	Kozhuf (C, P)	26	18	6	2	57	23	+34	42	Promotion to Macedonian First League
2	Bregalnica Shtip (Note: Bregalnica Shtip was deducted three points.)	26	16	4	6	50	17	+33	33	
3	Prvi Partizan Turnovo	26	13	4	9	49	33	+16	30	
4	Udarnik	26	10	6	10	39	27	+12	26	
5	Metalurg Titov Veles	26	10	6	10	28	22	+6	26	
6	Dojransko Ezero	26	10	6	10	49	45	+4	26	
7	Bregalnica Delchevo	26	10	5	11	39	28	+11	25	
8	Varosh	26	10	5	11	38	47	−9	25	
9	Sloga Vinica	26	11	1	14	60	52	+8	23	
10	Pobeda Valandovo	26	9	5	12	32	40	−8	23	
11	Vardarski	26	10	3	13	34	56	−22	23	
12	Kumanovo	26	7	8	11	32	35	−3	22	
13	Bratstvo Golemo Konjari (R)	26	9	3	14	23	69	−46	21	Relegation to Macedonian Third League
14	Tiverija Skanmak (R)	26	6	4	16	33	69	−36	16	Relegation to Macedonian Third League

Source: MacedonianFootball.com and rsssf.org
Rules for classification: 1) Points; 2) Head-to-head points; 3) Head-to-head goal difference; 4) Head-to-head away goals scored
(C) Champions; (P) Promoted; (R) Relegated

== West ==
=== Participating teams ===
Location of teams in 1993–94 Macedonian Second League - West

Club	City
Gostivar	Gostivar
Korab	Debar
Madjari Solidarnost	Skopje
Metalurg	Skopje
Napredok	Kichevo
Novaci	Novaci
Ohrid	Ohrid
Pitu Guli	Krushevo
Prespa	Resen
Rabotnichki Koleks	Skopje
Shkëndija	Arachinovo
Skopje	Skopje
Tehnokom Gorno Lisiche	Skopje
Teteks	Tetovo

=== League standing ===
Pos	Team	Pld	W	D	L	GF	GA	GD	Pts	Promotion or relegation
1	Ohrid (C, P)	26	15	5	6	61	19	+42	35	Promotion to Macedonian First League
2	Metalurg	26	11	8	7	28	21	+7	30	
3	Teteks	26	12	5	9	43	33	+10	29	
4	Shkëndija Arachinovo	26	12	5	9	41	35	+6	29	
5	Skopje	26	11	4	11	54	42	+12	26	
6	Napredok	26	12	2	12	39	42	−3	26	
7	Madjari Solidarnost	26	11	4	11	36	43	−7	26	
8	Korab	26	11	3	12	44	31	+13	25	
9	Novaci	26	10	5	11	25	31	−6	25	
10	Pitu Guli	26	11	3	12	28	40	−12	25	
11	Prespa	26	11	1	14	31	46	−15	23	
12	Rabotnichki Koleks	26	9	4	13	31	38	−7	22	
13	Gostivar	26	9	4	13	34	52	−18	22	
14	Tehnokom Gorno Lisiche (R)	26	7	7	12	23	45	−22	21	Relegation to Macedonian Third League

Source: MacedonianFootball.com and rsssf.org
Rules for classification: 1) Points; 2) Head-to-head points; 3) Head-to-head goal difference; 4) Head-to-head away goals scored
(C) Champions; (P) Promoted; (R) Relegated

== See also ==
- 1993–94 Macedonian Football Cup
- 1993–94 Macedonian First Football League
