= 1995–96 Macedonian Second Football League =

Macedonian Second League
- Season: 1995–96
- Champions: Bregalnica Shtip (East); Shkëndija Tetovo (West)
- Promoted: Bregalnica Shtip; Shkëndija Tetovo
- Relegated: Rabotnik Djumajlija; Udarnik; Kavadarci; Korab; Gostivar; Ilinden Skopje; Varosh

The 1995–96 Macedonian Second Football League was the fourth season since its establishment. It began on 19 August 1995 and ended on 8 June 1996.

The Pobeda Valandovo did not start the season in the protest in protest against the decision that declined the promotion, and was excluded from the league. Udarnik was added to their place after three rounds.

== East ==
=== Participating teams ===
Location of teams in 1995–96 Macedonian Second League - East

Club	City
Bashkimi	Kumanovo
Borec	Titov Veles
Bregalnica Delchevo	Delchevo
Bregalnica Shtip	Shtip
Dojransko Ezero	Nov Dojran
Kavadarci	Kavadarci
Kozhuf	Gevgelija
Kumanovo	Kumanovo
Malesh	Berovo
Metalurg	Titov Veles
Plachkovica Jaka	Radovish
Rabotnik	Lozovo
Turnovo	Turnovo
Udarnik	Pirava
Vardar	Negotino
Vardarski	Bogdanci

=== League standing ===
Pos	Team	Pld	W	D	L	GF	GA	GD	Pts	Promotion or relegation
1	Bregalnica Shtip (C, P)	30	24	6	0	89	19	+70	78	Promotion to Macedonian First League
2	Borec	30	19	4	7	61	33	+28	61	
3	Plachkovica Jaka (Note: Plachkovica Jaka and Bregalnica Delchevo were deducted six points for match fixing in the previous season.)	30	16	7	7	47	21	+26	49	
4	Malesh	30	14	6	10	39	33	+6	48	
5	Bregalnica Delchevo	30	15	7	8	44	29	+15	46	
6	Metalurg Veles	30	13	4	13	41	43	−2	43	
7	Turnovo	30	13	3	14	50	44	+6	42	
8	Bashkimi	30	12	6	12	41	37	+4	42	
9	Vardarski	30	12	5	13	44	41	+3	41	
10	Vardar Negotino	30	12	5	13	39	37	+2	41	
11	Kumanovo	30	11	7	12	58	47	+11	40	
12	Dojransko Ezero	30	11	6	13	51	45	+6	39	
13	Kozhuf	30	11	6	13	29	39	−10	39	
14	Rabotnik Djumajlija (R)	30	7	4	19	35	68	−33	25	Relegation to Macedonian Third League
15	Udarnik (R)	30	5	2	23	33	93	−60	17	Relegation to Macedonian Third League
16	Kavadarci (Note: Kavadarci was deducted three points for not paying referee’s fee.) (R)	30	4	4	22	25	97	−72	13	Relegation to Macedonian Third League

Source: MacedonianFootball.com
Rules for classification: 1) Points; 2) Head-to-head points; 3) Head-to-head goal difference; 4) Head-to-head away goals scored
(C) Champions; (P) Promoted; (R) Relegated

=== Results ===
Home \ Away	BAS	BOR	BRD	BRS	DOJ	KAV	KOZ	KUM	MAL	MVE	PLA	RBT	TUR	UDA	VRN	VRD
Bashkimi	—	0–1	2–0	1–1	0–1	3–0	1–1	2–1	3–0	1–0	1–0	0–0	2–0	4–1	2–0	4–1
Borec	2–0	—	2–2	1–1	1–0	7–1	2–1	3–0	1–0	1–0	1–0	5–1	6–1	3–0 (Note: Match awarded because a Udarnik didn't show up at the match.)	1–0	6–3
Bregalnica Delchevo	2–1	2–0	—	0–0	2–0	4–0	2–0	4–1	1–0	4–1	0–1	1–0	3–0	4–0	0–0	1–0
Bregalnica Shtip	5–1	5–2	4–1	—	3–1	5–1	5–0	2–1	4–1	3–0	2–0	5–0	2–1	7–0	4–0	2–1
Dojransko Ezero	2–0	0–2	1–1	0–1	—	7–1	5–1	2–2	1–3	2–0	0–0	5–2	2–0	3–3	0–3	4–0
Kavadarci	1–1	1–2	0–1	1–3	0–3	—	2–1	0–3 (Note: Match awarded because a Kavadarci refused to pay the referee fee in advance.)	0–0	2–4	1–1	0–2	2–1	3–2	2–1	3–3
Kozhuf	2–0	1–0	2–0	1–2	1–2	2–0	—	1–1	1–0	1–0	0–0	1–1	3–1	2–1	3–0	1–0
Kumanovo	3–3	1–1	1–1	1–2	5–3	7–4	1–0	—	3–1	1–0	1–1	1–0	2–0	13–2	0–1	2–0
Malesh	1–0	4–2	1–1	0–0	1–0	3–0	2–0	2–1	—	0–0	1–0	3–0	3–1	2–0	2–2	1–0
Metalurg Veles	3–1	1–1	2–0	1–1	4–1	5–0	4–0	3–1	1–0	—	0–0	0–4	2–1	5–0	1–0	1–0
Plachkovica Jaka	3–0	2–1	2–0	3–5	2–1	6–0	0–0	2–0	1–0	6–0	—	3–0	2–0	2–0	2–0	1–0
Rabotnik Djumajlija	1–3	1–2	1–4	0–5	2–2	2–0	0–0	2–1	1–2	0–1	3–2	—	3–0	5–1	1–3	0–2
Turnovo	2–2	1–0	2–0	0–0	3–0	4–0	1–0	2–0	4–2	3–0	1–0	7–1	—	5–1	3–0	1–1
Udarnik	0–3	1–2	0–1	0–3	1–3	3–0	1–3	2–1	2–3	4–1	1–2	1–0	2–4	—	2–0	1–1
Vardar Negotino	2–0	1–2	3–0	0–4 (Note: Match awarded because a Bregalnica Delchevo refused to play claiming they were attacked.)	0–0	5–0	3–0	1–1	0–0	4–1	0–1	4–1	2–1	3–1	—	1–0
Vardarski	1–0	2–1	2–2	0–3	1–0	6–0	2–0	0–2	3–1	1–0	2–2	4–1	1–0	5–0	2–0	—

Source: MacedonianFootball.com
Legend: Blue = home team win; Yellow = draw; Red = away team win.

== West ==
=== Participating teams ===
Location of teams in 1995–96 Macedonian Second League - West

Club	City
Flamurtari	Radolishta
Gostivar	Gostivar
Ilinden	Ilinden, Skopje
Karaorman	Struga
Korab	Debar
Madjari Solidarnost	Skopje
Napredok	Kichevo
Novaci	Novaci
Prespa	Resen
Rabotnichki Kometal	Skopje
Shkëndija Arachinovo	Arachinovo
Shkëndija Tetovo	Tetovo
Skopje	Skopje
Svetlost	Kukurechani
Teteks	Tetovo
Varosh	Prilep

=== League standing ===
Pos	Team	Pld	W	D	L	GF	GA	GD	Pts	Promotion or relegation
1	Shkëndija Tetovo (C, P)	30	19	6	5	65	23	+42	63	Promotion to Macedonian First League
2	Napredok	30	16	4	10	40	25	+15	52	
3	Shkëndija Arachinovo	30	14	5	11	51	35	+16	47	
4	Flamurtari Radolishta	30	14	3	13	59	51	+8	45	
5	Madjari Solidarnost	30	14	3	13	47	47	0	45	
6	Teteks	30	13	5	12	45	35	+10	44	
7	Skopje	30	13	5	12	58	49	+9	44	
8	Karaorman	30	14	2	14	45	39	+6	44	
9	Prespa	30	14	2	14	47	50	−3	44	
10	Rabotnichki Kometal	30	11	10	9	45	33	+12	43 (Note: Head-to-head record: Rabotnichki Kometal 9 pts, Novaci 9 pts, Svetlost 8 pts, Korab 7 pts; goal difference: Rabotnichki Kometal +5, Novaci –9.)	
11	Novaci	30	13	4	13	40	47	−7	43	
12	Svetlost	30	12	7	11	41	48	−7	43	
13	Korab (R)	30	13	4	13	51	45	+6	43	Relegation to Macedonian Third League
14	Gostivar (R)	30	13	2	15	40	50	−10	41	Relegation to Macedonian Third League
15	Ilinden Skopje (R)	30	9	5	16	28	57	−29	32	Relegation to Macedonian Third League
16	Varosh (R)	30	4	1	25	24	92	−68	13	Relegation to Macedonian Third League

Source: MacedonianFootball.com
Rules for classification: 1) Points; 2) Head-to-head points; 3) Head-to-head goal difference; 4) Head-to-head away goals scored
(C) Champions; (P) Promoted; (R) Relegated

=== Results ===
Home \ Away	FLA	GOS	ILI	KAR	KOR	MAS	NAP	NOV	PRE	RAB	SKA	SKE	SKO	SVE	TET	VRS
Flamurtari Radolishta	—	2–0	6–1	2–0	1–2	5–2	0–1	2–0	3–2	2–3	4–3	0–2	11–2	2–1	1–1	3–0 (Note: Match awarded because a Varosh didn't show up at the match.)
Gostivar	1–0	—	3–0	2–1	1–3	2–1	3–1	3–1	3–0	3–0	0–0	1–2	2–0	1–0	2–1	3–0 (Note: Match awarded because a Varosh was disqualified from the competition for not playing two matches.)
Ilinden Skopje	4–0	3–1	—	1–0	0–0	0–1	0–1	2–1	1–0	0–0	0–1	0–0	1–0	2–2	2–1	5–0
Karaorman	1–2	2–1	5–1	—	2–0	2–0	2–0	1–0	4–0	2–3	0–1	2–2	2–1	3–0	1–0	4–1
Korab	2–3	2–2	1–0	4–0	—	1–3	1–3	5–0	3–1	1–1	3–2	2–1	0–2	2–0	2–0	6–0
Madjari Solidarnost	3–1	2–0	2–3	3–0	2–0	—	0–0	1–1	3–2	1–0	1–0	1–3	1–2	3–0	2–1	5–3
Napredok	1–1	3–0	4–0	2–0	2–3	1–2	—	2–0	2–0	2–0	2–0	1–1	2–1	2–0	1–0	3–0
Novaci	3–1	1–0	2–1	1–1	4–3	5–0	0–1	—	3–2	2–0	1–0	1–0	0–0	2–1	2–0	2–1
Prespa	3–0	3–0	2–0	1–0	2–2	1–0	2–0	3–1	—	2–1	2–0	2–1	1–0	2–2	2–1	1–0
Rabotnichki	2–2	5–0	1–0	1–2	2–0	2–0	1–0	5–0	4–1	—	0–2	1–1	1–1	1–1	1–2	3–0
Shkëndija Arachinovo	3–0	3–4	4–0	3–1	2–0	1–1	1–1	3–1	4–2	0–0	—	1–0	1–3	5–2	2–0	0–0
Shkëndija Tetovo	3–0	2–0	4–0	2–0	3–0	3–0	3–0	3–0	3–2	0–0	1–0	—	4–2	5–0	2–0	8–2
Skopje	2–0	4–0	9–0	1–3	2–1	1–4	2–0	0–0	2–1	0–0	1–3	3–2	—	5–0	1–1	2–1
Svetlost	2–1	2–0	0–0	2–1	1–0	3–1	1–0	3–0 (Note: The match was abandoned in the 68th minute with a score of 1–1 when a Novaci player attacked the referee. Later, the match was awarded to Svetlost.)	2–1	1–1	3–2	1–2	2–1	—	1–1	5–2
Teteks	1–2	3–1	5–1	2–0	3–0	2–1	1–0	3–0	3–1	1–3	1–0	1–1	4–3	0–0	—	3–0
Varosh	0–2	3–1	1–0	0–3	0–2	2–1	0–2	0–6	2–3	4–3	1–4	0–1	1–5	0–3 (Note: The match was abandoned in the 62nd minute with a score of 2–4 when a Varosh player attacked the referee. Later, the match was awarded to Svetlost.)	0–3	—

Source: MacedonianFootball.com
Legend: Blue = home team win; Yellow = draw; Red = away team win.

== See also ==
- 1995–96 Macedonian Football Cup
- 1995–96 Macedonian First Football League
