= 1992–93 in Republic of Macedonia football =

The following article presents a summary of the 1992–93 football season in the Republic of Macedonia, which is the first season of competitive football in the country after a country's declaration of independence from Yugoslavia.

== Summary ==
| Competition | Winner | Runners-up |
|---|---|---|
| First League | Vardar (1st title) | Sileks |
| Second League | Ljuboten | Karaorman |
| Macedonian Cup | Vardar (1st title) | Pelister |

== League Competitions ==
=== First League ===
| Pos | Team | Pld | W | D | L | GF | GA | GD | Pts | Qualification or relegation |
|---|---|---|---|---|---|---|---|---|---|---|
| 1 | Vardar (C) | 34 | 27 | 7 | 0 | 119 | 16 | +103 | 61 | Champions |
| 2 | Sileks | 34 | 17 | 6 | 11 | 72 | 50 | +22 | 40 | |
| 3 | Balkan | 34 | 15 | 10 | 9 | 36 | 21 | +15 | 40 | |
| 4 | Pelister | 34 | 14 | 8 | 12 | 47 | 36 | +11 | 36 | |
| 5 | Sasa | 34 | 14 | 8 | 12 | 41 | 44 | −3 | 36 | |
| 6 | Sloga Jugomagnat | 34 | 13 | 8 | 13 | 46 | 37 | +9 | 34 | |
| 7 | Tikvesh | 34 | 12 | 10 | 12 | 52 | 50 | +2 | 34 | |
| 8 | Osogovo | 34 | 13 | 8 | 13 | 39 | 41 | −2 | 34 | |
| 9 | Rudar Probishtip | 34 | 15 | 4 | 15 | 44 | 47 | −3 | 34 | |
| 10 | Belasica | 34 | 12 | 10 | 12 | 41 | 44 | −3 | 34 | |
| 11 | Pobeda | 34 | 14 | 5 | 15 | 51 | 48 | +3 | 33 | |
| 12 | Borec | 34 | 12 | 8 | 14 | 42 | 43 | −1 | 32 | |
| 13 | FCU 55 | 34 | 13 | 6 | 15 | 37 | 53 | −16 | 32 | |
| 14 | Makedonija | 34 | 10 | 12 | 12 | 31 | 51 | −20 | 32 | |
| 15 | Metalurg (R) | 34 | 12 | 7 | 15 | 37 | 42 | −5 | 31 | Relegation to the Macedonian Second League |
| 16 | Bregalnica Shtip (R) | 34 | 11 | 8 | 15 | 38 | 45 | −7 | 30 | Relegation to the Macedonian Second League |
| 17 | Teteks (R) | 34 | 12 | 6 | 16 | 35 | 56 | −21 | 30 | Relegation to the Macedonian Second League |
| 18 | Vardarski (R) | 34 | 2 | 5 | 27 | 16 | 100 | −84 | 9 | Relegation to the Macedonian Second League |

Source: MacedonianFootball.com, RSSSF.org
Rules for classification: 1) Points; 2) Goal difference; 3) Goals scored; 4) Head-to-head points; 5) Head-to-head goal difference; 6) Head-to-head away goals scored (only if two teams); 7) Head-to-head goals scored; 8) Draw; 9) Play-off. (Note: Criteria 2, 3 and 8 is only used if not deciding Champion or relegation).
(C) Champions; (R) Relegated

=== Second League ===
| Pos | Team | Pld | W | D | L | GF | GA | GD | Pts | Promotion or relegation |
|---|---|---|---|---|---|---|---|---|---|---|
| 1 | Ljuboten (C, P) | 38 | 22 | 9 | 7 | 72 | 32 | +40 | 53 | Promotion to Macedonian First League |
| 2 | Karaorman (P) | 38 | 24 | 5 | 9 | 73 | 37 | +36 | 53 | Promotion to Macedonian First League |
| 3 | Skopje | 38 | 21 | 9 | 8 | 74 | 33 | +41 | 51 | |
| 4 | Ohrid | 38 | 18 | 9 | 11 | 55 | 39 | +16 | 45 | |
| 5 | Madjari Solidarnost | 38 | 18 | 8 | 12 | 62 | 45 | +17 | 44 | |
| 6 | Bregalnica Delchevo (Note: Bregalnica Delchevo was deducted one point.) | 38 | 19 | 7 | 12 | 60 | 42 | +18 | 44 | |
| 7 | Kozhuf | 38 | 18 | 4 | 16 | 61 | 52 | +9 | 40 | |
| 8 | Napredok | 38 | 16 | 7 | 15 | 54 | 41 | +13 | 39 | |
| 9 | Gostivar | 38 | 16 | 7 | 15 | 56 | 53 | +3 | 39 | |
| 10 | Rabotnichki | 38 | 15 | 9 | 14 | 48 | 47 | +1 | 39 | |
| 11 | Prespa | 38 | 15 | 8 | 15 | 47 | 53 | −6 | 38 | |
| 12 | Pobeda Valandovo | 38 | 17 | 4 | 17 | 52 | 58 | −6 | 38 | |
| 13 | Sloga Vinica | 38 | 15 | 6 | 17 | 56 | 62 | −6 | 36 | |
| 14 | Metalurg Titov Veles | 38 | 15 | 5 | 18 | 55 | 64 | −9 | 35 | |
| 15 | Udarnik | 38 | 14 | 6 | 18 | 68 | 62 | +6 | 34 | |
| 16 | Bratstvo Golemo Konjari | 38 | 15 | 3 | 20 | 48 | 74 | −26 | 33 | |
| 17 | Jugotutun Novaci | 38 | 12 | 6 | 20 | 40 | 63 | −23 | 30 | |
| 18 | Kumanovo | 38 | 10 | 7 | 21 | 52 | 80 | −28 | 27 | |
| 19 | Bratstvo Resen (R) | 38 | 10 | 3 | 25 | 40 | 88 | −48 | 23 | Relegation to Macedonian Third League |
| 20 | Ovche Pole (R) | 38 | 6 | 6 | 26 | 30 | 78 | −48 | 18 | Relegation to Macedonian Third League |

Source: MacedonianFootball.com
Rules for classification: 1) Points; 2) Head-to-head points; 3) Head-to-head goal difference; 4) Head-to-head away goals scored
(C) Champions; (P) Promoted; (R) Relegated

== Macedonian Cup ==
=== Final ===
23 May 1993
20:00 CEST

| Vardar | 1–0 | Pelister |
|---|---|---|
| Savov 88' |

Gradski stadion, Skopje
Attendance: 20,000
Referee: Goce Popev (Skopje)

== See also ==
- 1992–93 FK Vardar season
