= 1994–95 Macedonian Second Football League =

Macedonian Second League
- Season: 1994–95
- Champions: Pobeda Valandovo (East); Makedonija (West)
- Promoted: Makedonija
- Relegated: Pobeda Valandovo; Sloga Vinica; Tri Cheshmi; Sloga Gorni Podlog; Zheleznichar Bogomila; Metalurg Skopje; Pitu Guli; Suvenir

The 1994–95 Macedonian Second Football League was the third season since its establishment. It began in August 1994 and ended in June 1995.

== East ==
=== Participating teams ===
Location of teams in 1994–95 Macedonian Second League - East

Club	City
Bashkimi	Kumanovo
Bregalnica Delchevo	Delchevo
Bregalnica Shtip	Shtip
Dojransko Ezero	Nov Dojran
Kumanovo	Kumanovo
Metalurg	Titov Veles
Plachkovica	Radovish
Pobeda	Valandovo
Sloga Gorni Podlog	Gorni Podlog
Sloga Vinica	Vinica
Tri Cheshmi	Tri Cheshmi, Shtip
Turnovo	Turnovo
Udarnik	Pirava
Vardar	Negotino
Vardarski	Bogdanci
Zheleznichar	Bogomila

=== League standing ===
Pos	Team	Pld	W	D	L	GF	GA	GD	Pts	Relegation
1	Pobeda Valandovo (C, R)	30	24	4	2	77	22	+55	76	Relegation to Macedonian Third League (Note: Pobeda Valandovo were declined the promotion and were relegated by the Federation due to suspicious matches.)
2	Kumanovo	30	23	6	1	65	20	+45	75	
3	Bregalnica Shtip	30	15	4	11	45	32	+13	49	
4	Plachkovica	30	14	4	12	52	39	+13	46	
5	Bashkimi	30	13	5	12	48	37	+11	44	
6	Metalurg Titov Veles	30	12	7	11	49	37	+12	43	
7	Bregalnica Delchevo	30	12	7	11	33	34	−1	43	
8	Turnovo	30	12	5	13	38	33	+5	41	
9	Vardarski	30	12	4	14	49	48	+1	40	
10	Vardar Negotino	30	12	4	14	59	65	−6	40	
11	Udarnik	30	10	9	11	43	42	+1	39	
12	Dojransko Ezero	30	11	6	13	49	51	−2	39	
13	Sloga Vinica (R)	30	10	7	13	43	39	+4	37	Relegation to Macedonian Third League
14	Tri Cheshmi (R)	30	11	4	15	37	66	−29	37	Relegation to Macedonian Third League
15	Sloga Gorni Podlog (R)	30	7	2	21	31	54	−23	23	Relegation to Macedonian Third League
16	Zheleznichar Bogomila (R)	30	2	2	26	18	117	−99	8	Relegation to Macedonian Third League

Source: MacedonianFootball.com
Rules for classification: 1) Points; 2) Head-to-head points; 3) Head-to-head goal difference; 4) Head-to-head away goals scored
(C) Champions; (R) Relegated

== West ==
=== Participating teams ===
Location of teams in 1994–95 Macedonian Second League - West

Club	City
Gostivar	Gostivar
Karaorman	Struga
Korab	Debar
Madjari Solidarnost	Skopje
Makedonija	Skopje
Metalurg	Skopje
Napredok	Kichevo
Novaci	Novaci
Pitu Guli	Krushevo
Prespa	Resen
Rabotnichki	Skopje
Shkëndija Arachinovo	Arachinovo
Shkëndija Tetovo	Tetovo
Skopje	Skopje
Suvenir	Samokov
Teteks	Tetovo
Varosh	Prilep

=== League standing ===
Pos	Team	Pld	W	D	L	GF	GA	GD	Pts	Promotion or relegation
1	Makedonija Skopje (C, P)	32	23	5	4	75	25	+50	74	Promotion to Macedonian First League
2	Shkëndija Arachinovo	32	20	7	5	76	27	+49	67	
3	Gostivar	32	20	5	7	72	30	+42	65	
4	Shkëndija Tetovo	32	16	6	10	61	38	+23	54	
5	Teteks	32	16	2	14	53	51	+2	50	
6	Napredok	32	14	7	11	58	48	+10	49	
7	Novaci	32	14	5	13	44	51	−7	47	
8	Varosh	32	12	7	13	53	53	0	43	
9	Korab	32	13	4	15	46	49	−3	43	
10	Prespa	32	13	2	17	37	60	−23	41	
11	Rabotnichki	32	11	7	14	47	41	+6	40	
12	Skopje	32	13	1	18	48	63	−15	40	
13	Madjari Solidarnost	32	11	6	15	60	70	−10	39	
14	Karaorman	32	11	5	16	45	67	−22	38	
15	Metalurg (R)	32	8	11	13	43	58	−15	35	Relegation to Macedonian Third League
16	Pitu Guli (R)	32	9	5	18	38	71	−33	32	Relegation to Macedonian Third League
17	Suvenir (Note: Suvenir was deducted three points.) (R)	32	4	3	25	29	83	−54	12	Relegation to Macedonian Third League

Source: MacedonianFootball.com
Rules for classification: 1) Points; 2) Head-to-head points; 3) Head-to-head goal difference; 4) Head-to-head away goals scored
(C) Champions; (P) Promoted; (R) Relegated

== See also ==
- 1994–95 Macedonian Football Cup
- 1994–95 Macedonian First Football League
