= 1997–98 Macedonian Second Football League =

Macedonian Second League
- Season: 1997–98
- Champions: Osogovo (East); Rabotnichki (West)
- Promoted: Osogovo; Rabotnichki
- Relegated: Rosoman 83; Astibo; Turnovo; Rudar Probishtip; Flamurtari Radolishta; Proleter; Madjari Solidarnost

The 1997–98 Macedonian Second Football League was the sixth season since its establishment. It began in August 1997 and ended in May 1998.

== East ==
=== Participating teams ===
Location of teams in 1997–98 Macedonian Second League - East

| Club | City |
|---|---|
| Astibo | Shtip |
| Bashkimi | Kumanovo |
| Bregalnica | Delchevo |
| Gaber | Vatasha |
| Jaka | Radovish |
| Kozhuf | Gevgelija |
| Kumanovo | Kumanovo |
| Malesh | Berovo |
| Metalurg | Veles |
| Osogovo | Kochani |
| Ovche Pole | Sveti Nikole |
| Rosoman 83 | Rosoman |
| Rudar | Probishtip |
| Sloga | Vinica |
| Turnovo | Turnovo |
| Vardar | Negotino |

=== League standing ===
| Pos | Team | Pld | W | D | L | GF | GA | GD | Pts | Promotion or relegation |
|---|---|---|---|---|---|---|---|---|---|---|
| 1 | Osogovo (C, P) | 29 | 21 | 5 | 3 | 90 | 26 | +64 | 68 | Promotion to Macedonian First League |
| 2 | Kumanovo | 29 | 17 | 7 | 5 | 77 | 25 | +52 | 58 | |
| 3 | Jaka Radovish | 29 | 17 | 7 | 5 | 61 | 27 | +34 | 58 | |
| 4 | Malesh | 29 | 14 | 5 | 10 | 41 | 28 | +13 | 47 | |
| 5 | Bashkimi | 29 | 13 | 5 | 11 | 48 | 36 | +12 | 44 | |
| 6 | Vardar Negotino | 29 | 14 | 2 | 13 | 55 | 44 | +11 | 44 | |
| 7 | Gaber | 29 | 14 | 2 | 13 | 51 | 47 | +4 | 44 | |
| 8 | Sloga Vinica | 29 | 12 | 5 | 12 | 59 | 41 | +18 | 41 | |
| 9 | Bregalnica Delchevo | 29 | 12 | 5 | 12 | 50 | 44 | +6 | 41 | |
| 10 | Ovche Pole | 29 | 12 | 5 | 12 | 31 | 34 | −3 | 41 | |
| 11 | Metalurg Veles | 29 | 10 | 9 | 10 | 25 | 25 | 0 | 39 | |
| 12 | Kozhuf | 29 | 11 | 5 | 13 | 35 | 53 | −18 | 38 | |
| 13 | Rosoman 83 (R) | 29 | 11 | 2 | 16 | 34 | 72 | −38 | 35 | Relegation to Macedonian Third League |
| 14 | Astibo (R) | 29 | 6 | 3 | 20 | 33 | 83 | −50 | 21 | Relegation to Macedonian Third League |
| 15 | Turnovo (Note: Turnovo and Rudar Probishtip were deducted three points.) (R) | 15 | 3 | 3 | 9 | 14 | 44 | −30 | 9 | Withdrew from the competition |
| 16 | Rudar Probishtip (R) | 29 | 1 | 4 | 24 | 21 | 96 | −75 | 4 | Relegation to Macedonian Third League |

Source: MacedonianFootball.com
Rules for classification: 1) Points; 2) Head-to-head points; 3) Head-to-head goal difference; 4) Head-to-head away goals scored
(C) Champions; (P) Promoted; (R) Relegated

== West ==
=== Participating teams ===
Location of teams in 1997–98 Macedonian Second League - West

| Club | City |
|---|---|
| Alumina | Skopje |
| Flamurtari | Radolishta |
| Jugohrom | Jegunovce |
| Karaorman | Struga |
| Madjari Solidarnost | Skopje |
| Napredok | Kichevo |
| Novaci | Novaci |
| Ohrid | Ohrid |
| Prespa | Resen |
| Proleter | Makedonski Brod |
| Rabotnichki Kometal | Skopje |
| Shkëndija Arachinovo | Arachinovo |
| Shkëndija Tetovo | Tetovo |
| Svetlost | Kukurechani |
| Teteks | Tetovo |
| Vlaznimi | Struga |

=== League standing ===
| Pos | Team | Pld | W | D | L | GF | GA | GD | Pts | Promotion or relegation |
|---|---|---|---|---|---|---|---|---|---|---|
| 1 | Rabotnichki Kometal (C, P) | 30 | 20 | 7 | 3 | 62 | 18 | +44 | 67 | Promotion to Macedonian First League |
| 2 | Jugohrom | 30 | 18 | 7 | 5 | 64 | 31 | +33 | 61 | |
| 3 | Teteks | 30 | 14 | 6 | 10 | 43 | 30 | +13 | 48 | |
| 4 | Shkëndija Arachinovo | 30 | 12 | 10 | 8 | 59 | 36 | +23 | 46 | |
| 5 | Karaorman | 30 | 11 | 11 | 8 | 54 | 35 | +19 | 44 | |
| 6 | Prespa | 30 | 13 | 3 | 14 | 45 | 63 | −18 | 42 | |
| 7 | Napredok | 30 | 12 | 5 | 13 | 32 | 35 | −3 | 41 | |
| 8 | Novaci | 30 | 12 | 5 | 13 | 41 | 55 | −14 | 41 | |
| 9 | Shkëndija Tetovo | 30 | 11 | 7 | 12 | 32 | 36 | −4 | 40 | |
| 10 | Alumina | 30 | 11 | 6 | 13 | 41 | 42 | −1 | 39 | |
| 11 | Vlaznimi | 30 | 11 | 5 | 14 | 45 | 59 | −14 | 38 | |
| 12 | Ohrid | 30 | 10 | 6 | 14 | 47 | 46 | +1 | 36 | |
| 13 | Svetlost | 30 | 10 | 6 | 14 | 45 | 50 | −5 | 36 | |
| 14 | Flamurtari Radolishta (R) | 30 | 10 | 6 | 14 | 39 | 49 | −10 | 36 | Relegation to Macedonian Third League |
| 15 | Proleter (R) | 30 | 10 | 5 | 15 | 34 | 63 | −29 | 35 | Relegation to Macedonian Third League |
| 16 | Madjari Solidarnost (R) | 30 | 5 | 5 | 20 | 38 | 73 | −35 | 20 | Relegation to Macedonian Third League |

Source: MacedonianFootball.com
Rules for classification: 1) Points; 2) Head-to-head points; 3) Head-to-head goal difference; 4) Head-to-head away goals scored
(C) Champions; (P) Promoted; (R) Relegated

== See also ==
- 1997–98 Macedonian Football Cup
- 1997–98 Macedonian First Football League
