= 1992–93 Macedonian Second Football League =

Macedonian Second League
- Season: 1992–93
- Champions: Ljuboten
- Promoted: Ljuboten; Karaorman
- Relegated: Bratstvo Resen; Ovche Pole

The 1992–93 Macedonian Second Football League was the first and inaugural season since its establishment after the Republic of Macedonia's independence from Yugoslavia. It began on 22 August 1992 and ended on 20 June 1993.

== Participating teams ==
Location of teams in 1992–93 Macedonian Second League

Club	City
Bratstvo (GK)	Golemo Konjari
Bratstvo (R)	Resen
Bregalnica	Delchevo
Gostivar	Gostivar
Jugotutun	Novaci
Karaorman	Struga
Kozhuf	Gevgelija
Kumanovo	Kumanovo
Ljuboten	Tetovo
Madjari Solidarnost	Skopje
Metalurg	Titov Veles
Napredok	Kichevo
Ohrid	Ohrid
Ovche Pole	Sveti Nikole
Pobeda	Valandovo
Prespa	Resen
Rabotnichki	Skopje
Skopje	Skopje
Sloga	Vinica
Udarnik	Pirava

== League standing ==
Pos	Team	Pld	W	D	L	GF	GA	GD	Pts	Promotion or relegation
1	Ljuboten (C, P)	38	22	9	7	72	32	+40	53	Promotion to Macedonian First League
2	Karaorman (P)	38	24	5	9	73	37	+36	53	Promotion to Macedonian First League
3	Skopje	38	21	9	8	74	33	+41	51	
4	Ohrid	38	18	9	11	55	39	+16	45	
5	Bregalnica Delchevo (Note: Bregalnica Delchevo was deducted one point.)	38	19	7	12	60	42	+18	44	
6	Madjari Solidarnost	38	18	8	12	62	45	+17	44	
7	Kozhuf	38	18	4	16	61	52	+9	40	
8	Napredok	38	16	7	15	54	41	+13	39	
9	Gostivar	38	16	7	15	56	53	+3	39	
10	Rabotnichki	38	15	9	14	48	47	+1	39	
11	Pobeda Valandovo	38	17	4	17	52	58	−6	38	
12	Prespa	38	15	8	15	47	53	−6	38	
13	Sloga Vinica	38	15	6	17	56	62	−6	36	
14	Metalurg Titov Veles	38	15	5	18	55	64	−9	35	
15	Udarnik	38	14	6	18	68	62	+6	34	
16	Bratstvo Golemo Konjari	38	15	3	20	48	74	−26	33	
17	Jugotutun Novaci	38	12	6	20	40	63	−23	30	
18	Kumanovo	38	10	7	21	52	80	−28	27	
19	Bratstvo Resen (R)	38	10	3	25	40	88	−48	23	Relegation to Macedonian Third League
20	Ovche Pole (R)	38	6	6	26	30	78	−48	18	Relegation to Macedonian Third League

Source: MacedonianFootball.com
Rules for classification: 1) Points; 2) Head-to-head points; 3) Head-to-head goal difference; 4) Head-to-head away goals scored
(C) Champions; (P) Promoted; (R) Relegated

== Results ==
Home \ Away	BGK	BRA	BRD	GOS	JUG	KAR	KOZ	KUM	LJU	MAS	MVE	NAP	OHR	OVC	PVA	PRE	RAB	SKO	SLO	UDA
Bratstvo Golemo Konjari	—	6–1	2–1	2–1	4–2	1–0	2–1	1–0	0–1	2–1	1–2	2–1	2–0	2–0	0–0	2–0	1–0	0–0	4–3	5–2
Bratstvo Resen	3–1	—	1–2	2–1	2–1	0–3	1–0	3–1	0–3 (Note: The match was abandoned in the 78th minute with a score of 2–2 when a Bratstvo Resen players attacked the referee. Later, the match was awarded to Ljuboten.)	1–3	3–1	1–3	0–2	2–1	2–1	1–1	1–3	3–1	1–1	2–1
Bregalnica Delchevo	3–0	5–0	—	4–0	2–0	2–1	2–1	3–0	0–0	3–0	4–0	0–0	1–0	3–0 (Note: Match awarded)	2–1	5–1	2–0	2–1	3–1	0–0
Gostivar	4–1	3–0 (Note: Match awarded because a Bratstvo Resen didn't show up at the match.)	0–0	—	3–1	2–1	4–1	1–0	0–0	4–4	2–1	4–2	2–0	5–0	3–0	2–0	2–1	1–0	1–0	1–0
Jugotutun	1–0	2–0	2–0	2–1	—	0–3 (Note: The match was abandoned in the 32nd minute with a score of 1–1 when the Jugohrom players attacked the referee due to a red card. Later, the match was awarded to Karaorman.)	1–0	1–1	1–1	1–0	0–1	2–1	0–0	2–0	0–0	2–1	2–1	0–1	2–0	3–3
Karaorman	1–0	2–1	2–0	1–0	3–2	—	1–0	8–1	4–2	1–0	6–3	3–1	3–0	2–1	3–0	3–0	0–3 (Note: The match was abandoned in the 82th minute with a score of 1–1 when a two home players attacked the referee. Later, the match was awarded to Rabotnichki.)	2–1	4–0	2–1
Kozhuf	4–2	4–1	5–0	2–0	2–1	0–0	—	2–0	1–3	2–1	1–0	1–0	1–3	4–1	2–1	0–1	4–1	2–0	3–0	2–0
Kumanovo	4–0	4–0	2–4	5–2	3–0	2–1	2–2	—	2–2	0–1	1–2	1–1	0–1	5–1	2–1	5–2	2–0	2–3	0–0	2–0
Ljuboten	3–0	2–1	3–2	2–2	2–0	2–0	0–0	7–0	—	3–0	4–0	3–2	1–3	1–0	2–0	2–0	3–0	2–2	2–0	4–1
Madjari Solidarnost	4–0	2–0	3–1	1–1	5–2	0–0	2–1	5–1	2–1	—	1–0	1–0	3–1	2–0	4–1	2–0	1–2	0–2	4–1	1–1
Metalurg Titov Veles	4–0	4–1	1–1	3–0	1–1	1–2	1–2	1–0	1–3	1–2	—	1–0	3–1	2–0	4–1	2–0	2–2	1–1	3–1	1–0
Napredok	3–0	3–0	3–0	6–2	2–1	1–2	2–1	5–0	0–0	1–0	2–1	—	1–0	2–0	2–0	3–1	0–0	0–0	2–0	2–0
Ohrid	3–1	0–0	3–0	1–1	2–0	2–2	3–0	3–0	1–0	1–0	2–1	3–2	—	2–0	2–0	3–2	4–1	1–1	0–0	2–3
Ovche Pole	0–0	3–1	0–0	3–1	0–1	1–2	1–2	1–0	0–1	0–1	3–1	0–0	1–3	—	1–1	1–0	1–5	1–1	0–1	3–2
Pobeda Valandovo	8–1	2–1	3–1	1–0	2–1	2–1	2–1	1–0	2–1	4–2	4–0	1–0	1–0	4–2	—	1–1	1–0	1–2	1–0	3–2
Prespa	1–0	3–0 (Note: The match was abandoned in the 89th minute with a score of 3–1 when the Bratstvo players attacked the referee. Later, the match was awarded to Prespa.)	1–0	0–0	2–1	3–0	3–3	3–0	2–1	0–0	2–1	0–0	1–1	4–1	3–0	—	2–1	1–0	2–1	1–0
Rabotnichki	2–1	2–1	0–1	1–0	3–0 (Note: The match was abandoned in the 87th minute with a score of 1–1 when a visitors attacked the referee after he awarded a penalty kick for the hosts. Later, the match was awarded to Rabotnichki.)	1–1	1–0	3–1	0–0	1–1	1–1	2–0	0–0	2–1	1–0	1–1	—	2–2	1–2	2–0
Skopje	2–0	5–1	3–0 (Note: The match was abandoned in the 83rd minute with a score of 2–1 when a Bregalnica Delchevo players attacked the referee. Later, the match was awarded to Skopje.)	3–0	3–0	0–2	3–0	1–1	0–2	0–0	5–0	4–1	2–0	2–0	4–0	4–2	2–0	—	4–1	5–0
Sloga Vinica	3–2	1–0	1–1	1–0	6–1	2–1	5–0	2–2	3–2	3–1	0–1	2–0	2–1	2–2	2–1	3–1	0–1	1–2	—	2–1
Udarnik	5–0	5–3	1–0	1–0	2–1	0–0	1–3	6–0	0–1	2–2	4–2	2–0	1–1	7–0	3–0	1–0	4–1	1–2	5–3	—

Source: MacedonianFootball.com
Legend: Blue = home team win; Yellow = draw; Red = away team win.

== See also ==
- 1992–93 Macedonian Football Cup
- 1992–93 Macedonian First Football League
