= 1996–97 Macedonian Second Football League =

History

Macedonian Second League
- Season: 1996–97
- Champions: Borec (East); Skopje (West)
- Promoted: Borec; Skopje
- Relegated: Dojransko Ezero; Vardarski; Karposh 93; 11 Oktomvri; Vevchani; Ljuboten

The 1996–97 Macedonian Second Football League was the fourth season since its establishment. It began in August 1996 and ended in June 1997.

== East ==
=== Participating teams ===
Location of teams in 1996–97 Macedonian Second League - East

Club	City
Bashkimi	Kumanovo
Borec	Veles
Bregalnica	Delchevo
Dojransko Ezero	Nov Dojran
Gaber	Vatasha
Karposh 93	Kumanovo
Kozhuf	Gevgelija
Kumanovo	Kumanovo
Malesh	Berovo
Metalurg	Veles
Osogovo	Kochani
Plachkovica Jaka	Radovish
Sloga	Vinica
Turnovo	Turnovo
Vardar	Negotino
Vardarski	Bogdanci

=== League standing ===
Pos	Team	Pld	W	D	L	GF	GA	GD	Pts	Promotion or relegation
1	Borec (C, P)	30	23	5	2	74	24	+50	74	Promotion to Macedonian First League
2	Osogovo	30	23	5	2	78	17	+61	74	
3	Bregalnica Delchevo	30	14	6	10	40	31	+9	48	
4	Plachkovica Jaka	30	15	2	13	60	48	+12	47	
5	Bashkimi	30	13	6	11	51	42	+9	45	
6	Sloga Vinica	30	12	7	11	49	40	+9	43	
7	Metalurg Veles	30	13	3	14	41	39	+2	42	
8	Kumanovo	30	13	3	14	41	43	−2	42	
9	Malesh	30	12	5	13	30	26	+4	41	
10	Gaber	30	12	4	14	50	56	−6	40	
11	Turnovo	30	12	4	14	37	45	−8	40	
12	Vardar Negotino	30	12	4	14	33	44	−11	40	
13	Kozhuf	30	12	3	15	29	39	−10	39	
14	Dojransko Ezero (R)	30	11	4	15	42	53	−11	37	Relegation to Macedonian Third League
15	Vardarski (R)	30	6	2	22	28	80	−52	20	Relegation to Macedonian Third League
16	Karposh 93 (R)	30	3	5	22	28	84	−56	14	Relegation to Macedonian Third League

Source: MacedonianFootball.com
Rules for classification: 1) Points; 2) Head-to-head points; 3) Head-to-head goal difference; 4) Head-to-head away goals scored
(C) Champions; (P) Promoted; (R) Relegated

== West ==
=== Participating teams ===
Location of teams in 1996–97 Macedonian Second League - West

Club	City
11 Oktomvri	Prilep
Flamurtari	Radolishta
Jugohrom	Jegunovce
Karaorman	Struga
Ljuboten	Tetovo
Madjari Solidarnost	Skopje
Napredok	Kichevo
Novaci	Novaci
Ohrid	Ohrid
Prespa	Resen
Rabotnichki Kometal	Skopje
Shkëndija	Arachinovo
Skopje	Skopje
Svetlost	Kukurechani
Teteks	Tetovo
Vevchani	Vevchani

=== League standing ===
Pos	Team	Pld	W	D	L	GF	GA	GD	Pts	Promotion or relegation
1	Skopje (C, P)	29	21	4	4	68	23	+45	67	Promotion to Macedonian First League
2	Karaorman	29	18	3	8	78	36	+42	57	
3	Teteks	29	16	5	8	46	21	+25	53	
4	Jugohrom	29	16	4	9	54	25	+29	52	
5	Prespa	29	14	3	12	46	45	+1	45	
6	Shkëndija Arachinovo	29	13	5	11	41	36	+5	44	
7	Napredok	29	12	6	11	46	35	+11	42	
8	Flamurtari Radolishta	29	13	2	14	49	40	+9	41	
9	Svetlost	29	13	2	14	50	50	0	41	
10	Ohrid	29	12	4	13	37	50	−13	40	
11	Rabotnichki Kometal	29	11	5	13	28	35	−7	38	
12	Madjari Solidarnost	29	11	4	14	43	57	−14	37	
13	Novaci	29	10	5	14	33	56	−23	35	
14	11 Oktomvri (Note: 11 Oktomvri and Ljuboten were deducted three points.) (R)	29	11	1	17	32	52	−20	31	Relegation to Macedonian Third League
15	Vevchani (R)	15	3	3	9	17	28	−11	12	Withdrew from the competition
16	Ljuboten (R)	29	3	0	26	23	102	−79	6	Relegation to Macedonian Third League

Source: MacedonianFootball.com
Rules for classification: 1) Points; 2) Head-to-head points; 3) Head-to-head goal difference; 4) Head-to-head away goals scored
(C) Champions; (P) Promoted; (R) Relegated

== See also ==
- 1996–97 Macedonian Football Cup
- 1996–97 Macedonian First Football League
