= Bardovci =

Bardovci Бардовци
- Village
- Село Бардовци
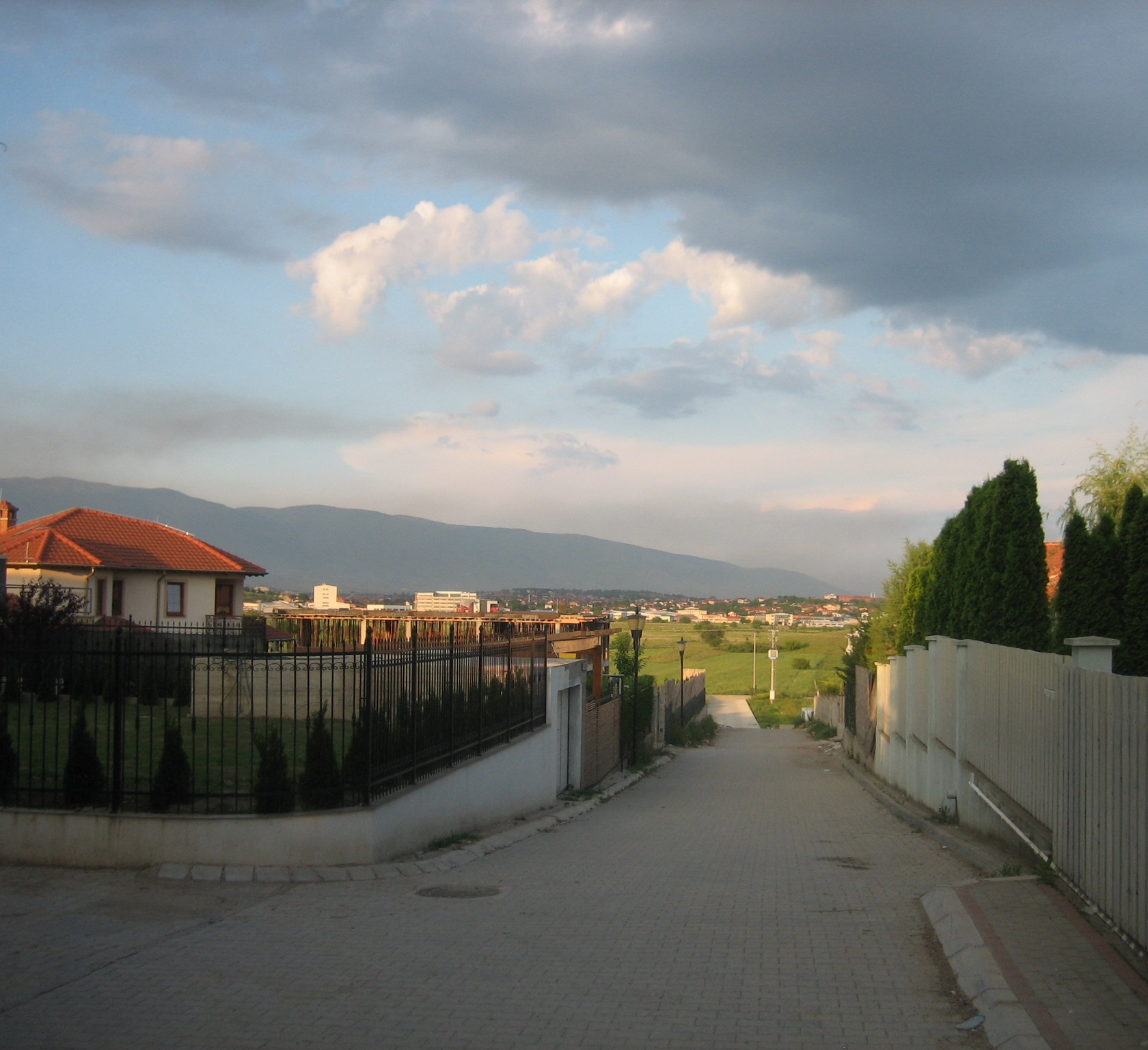
- Neighborhood in Bardovci, North Macedonia, 2012

- Location within North Macedonia
- Coordinates: 42°01′36″N 21°22′33″E
- Country: North Macedonia
- Region: Skopje
- Municipality: Karpoš

Population (2021)
  - Total: 2,291
- Time zone: UTC+1 (CET)
  - Summer (DST): UTC+2 (CEST)
- Car plates: SK

Bardovci (Macedonian: Бардовци; Albanian: Bardhoc) is a village in the municipality of Karpoš, North Macedonia.

== Name ==
The name of the village is derived from a proto-Albanian substrate from the form Bard-Bardh (white) alongside the Slavic suffix - "ovci".

== Demographics ==
According to the 1467-68 Ottoman defter, Bardovci appears as being inhabited by a Muslim population. The household heads' names are: Ali servant of Halil, Musa son of Abdullah, Ajdin servant of Haxhi Bula, Shahin son of Abdullah.

As of the 2021 census, Bardovci had 2,291 residents with the following ethnic composition:

- Macedonians 2,075
- Persons for whom data are taken from administrative sources 109
- Serbs 42
- Others 65

According to the 2002 census, the village had a total of 1,472 inhabitants. Ethnic groups in the village include:

- Macedonians 1,432
- Serbs 33
- Romani 2
- Others 7

== Sports ==
Local football club FK Lepenec has played in the Macedonian Third League twice.
