= Poroj =

- Village
- Порој
- Location within North Macedonia
- Coordinates: 42°02′N 21°00′E
- Country: North Macedonia
- Region: Polog
- Municipality: Tetovo

Population (2021)
  - Total: 2,653
- Time zone: UTC+1 (CET)
  - Summer (DST): UTC+2 (CEST)
- Car plates: TE
- Website: .

Poroj (Macedonian: Порој, Albanian: Poroj) is a village in the municipality of Tetovo, North Macedonia. It used to be part of the former municipality of Džepčište.

== History ==
Poroj is attested in the 1467/68 Ottoman tax registry (defter) for the Nahiyah of Kalkandelen. The village had a total of 110 Christian households, 5 bachelors and 7 widows.

According to the 1467-68 Ottoman defter, Poroj exhibits a mixture of Orthodox Christian Slavic and Albanian onomastics. Cases of families themselves having a mixed Slavic-Albanian anthroponomy also appear.

== Demographics ==
According to the 2021 census, the village had a total of 2.653 inhabitants. Ethnic groups in the village include:

- Albanians 2.558
- Macedonians 2
- Bosniaks 1
- Others 92

Year	Macedonian	Albanian	Bosniaks	Others	Total
2002	2	2.894	...	3	2.899
2021	2	2.558	1	92	2.653

According to the 1942 Albanian census, Poroj was inhabited by 1022 Muslim Albanians.

In statistics gathered by Vasil Kanchov in 1900, the village of Poroj was inhabited by 440 Muslim Albanians.

== Sports ==
Local football club KF Skënderbeu have played in the Macedonian Third League.

== Notable people ==
- Mujdin Aliu,(15 January 1974 – 14 April 1999) was an Albanian soldier who gained prominence in the Kosovo War. He served in the Kosovo Liberation Army (KLA), where he fought in the Battle of Koshare, and died in battle.
