= FK Gaber =

ФК Гaбер Ваташа FK Gaber Vatasha
- Full name: Fudbalski klub Gaber Vatasha
- Founded: 1962
- Ground: Kalnica Stadium Vatasha
- Capacity: 500
- League: Third League - South
- 2018–19: OFL Kavadarci, 1st (promoted)
Home colours	Away colours

FK Gaber Vatasha (Macedonian: ФК Гaбер Ваташа) is a football club from the village of Vatasha, Kavadarci, Republic of Macedonia. They currently play in the Macedonian Third League (South Division), and they play their home matches at Kalnica stadium in Vatasha.

== History ==
The club was founded in 1962.

Their best achievement was competing in the Macedonian Second League in 1996-97, 1997-98 and 1998-99.
