= Rečica, Kumanovo =

Rečica Речица
- Village
- Location within North Macedonia
- Coordinates: 42.176959°N 21.692715°E
- Country: North Macedonia
- Region: Northeastern
- Municipality: Kumanovo

Population (2002)
  - Total: 557
- Time zone: UTC+1 (CET)
  - Summer (DST): UTC+2 (CEST)
- Car plates: KU
- Website: .

Rečica (Macedonian: Речица) is a village in the municipality of Kumanovo, North Macedonia.

== Demographics ==
According to the 2002 census, the village had a total of 557 inhabitants. Ethnic groups in the village include:

- Macedonians 110
- Serbs 445
- Others 1

== Sports ==
Local football club FK Rečica plays in the Macedonian Third League (North Division).
