= FK Lepenec =

- Full name: Fudbalski klub Lepenec Bardovci
- Founded: 1963; 63 years ago
- Chairman: Igor Bozinovski
- League: OFS Skopje
- 2023–24: 2nd

FK Lepenec (Macedonian: ФК Лепенец) is a football club based in the village of Bardovci near Skopje, North Macedonia. They currently play in the OFS Skopje league.

== History ==
The club was founded in 1963. Club was named after the river of Lepenac which flows in the Bardovci.

The biggest achievement of the club was the winning of Macedonian Third League two times in 2008 and 2009.
