= FK Demir Hisar =

- Full name: Fudbalski klub Demir Hisar
- Founded: 1986; 40 years ago
- Ground: Stadion Valentin Stefanovski
- Capacity: 350
- League: Macedonian Third League (Region 5)
- 2024–25: 11th

FK Demir Hisar (Macedonian: ФК Демир Хисар) is a football club based in the town of Demir Hisar, North Macedonia. They are currently competing in the Macedonian Third League (Region 5).

== History ==
The club was founded in 1986.

Their best achievement was competing in the Macedonian Second League in 1998–99 season.
