= R'žaničino =

- Village
- Р'жаничино
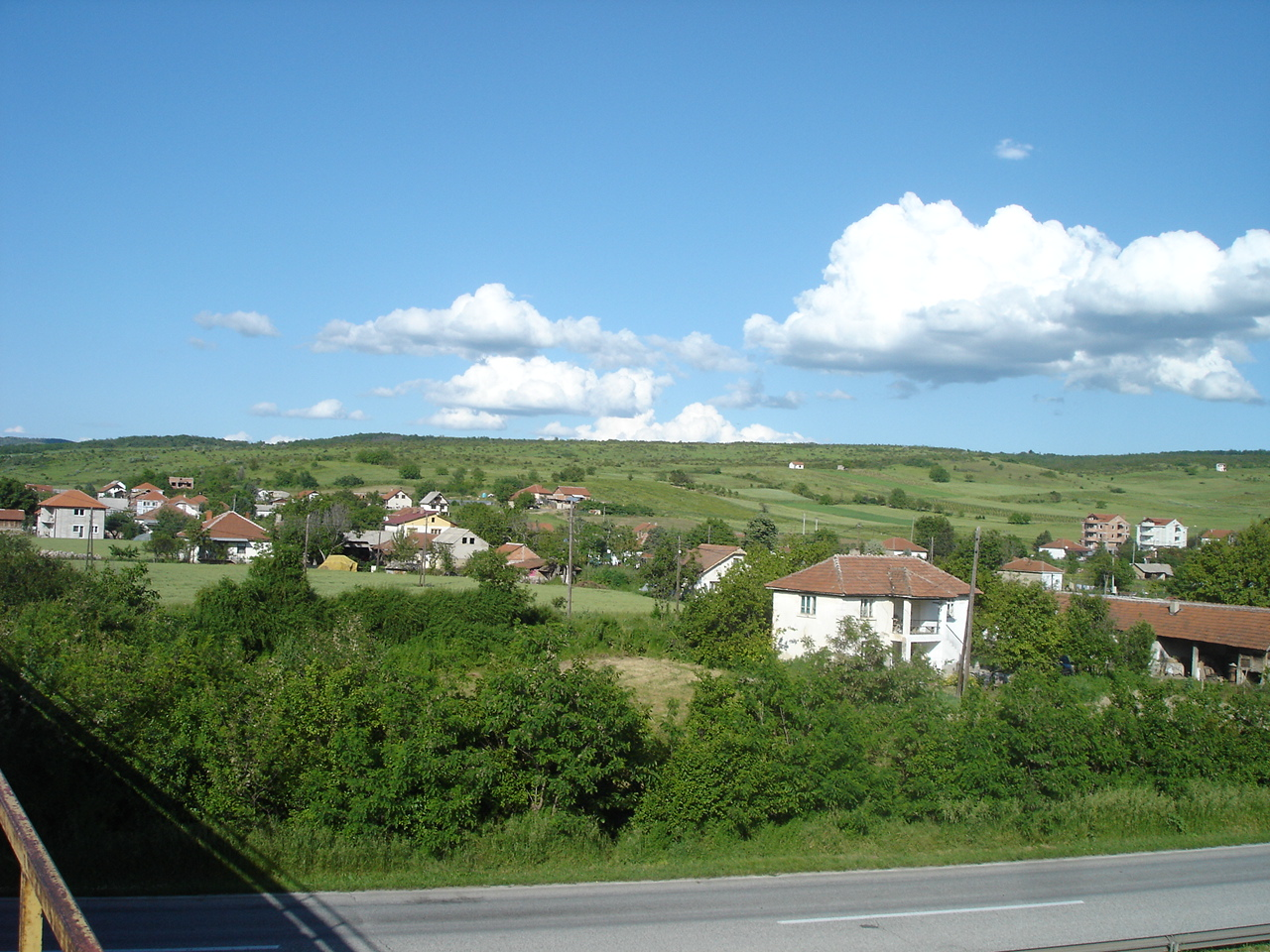

- Location within North Macedonia
- Coordinates: 41°55′33″N 21°37′50″E
- Country: North Macedonia
- Region: Skopje
- Municipality: Petrovec

Population (2021)
  - Total: 1,043
- Time zone: UTC+1 (CET)
  - Summer (DST): UTC+2 (CEST)
- Car plates: SK
- Website: .

R'žaničino (Macedonian: Р'жаничино) is a village in the municipality of Petrovec, North Macedonia.

== Demographics ==
According to the 1467-68 Ottoman defter, R'žaničino (Rezhança) appears as being inhabited by mixed Orthodox Slavic-Albanian population. Some families had a mixed Slav-Albanian anthroponomy - usually a Slavic first name and an Albanian last name or last names with Albanian patronyms and Slavic suffixes.

According to the 2002 census, the village had a total of 855 inhabitants. Ethnic groups in the village include:

- Macedonians 628
- Bosniaks 137
- Serbs 45
- Albanians 32
- Others 13

As of the 2021 census, R'žaničino had 1,043 residents with the following ethnic composition:

- Macedonians 687
- Bosniaks 226
- Persons for whom data are taken from administrative sources 49
- Albanians 42
- Serbs 25
- Others 14
