= Gradec, Vrapčište =

Gradec
- Village
- Градец
- Location within North Macedonia
- Coordinates: 41°53′45″N 20°54′15″E
- Country: North Macedonia
- Region: Polog
- Municipality: Vrapčište

Population (2021)
  - Total: 3,934
- Time zone: UTC+1 (CET)
  - Summer (DST): UTC+2 (CEST)
- Car plates: GV
- Website: .

Gradec (Macedonian: Градец, Albanian: Gradec) is a village in the municipality of Vrapčište, North Macedonia. It used to be part of Negotino-Pološko Municipality.

== Demographics ==
Gradec is attested in the 1567/68 Ottoman tax registry (defter) for the Nahiyah of Kalkandelen. The village had a total of 105 Christian households and 3 widows.

As of the 2021 census, Gradec had 3,934 residents with the following ethnic composition:

- Albanians 3,833
- Persons for whom data are taken from administrative sources 95
- Others 6

According to the 2002 census, the village had a total of 4,555 inhabitants. Ethnic groups in the village include:

- Albanians 4,535
- Macedonians 7
- Bosniaks 4
- Others 9

According to the 1942 Albanian census, Gradec was inhabited by 1685 Muslim Albanians.

In statistics gathered by Vasil Kanchov in 1900, the village of Gradec was inhabited by 660 Muslim Albanians and 100 Orthodox Bulgarians.

== Sports ==
Local football club KF Gradec plays in the OFS Gostivar league.
