= KF Skënderbeu Poroj =

Skënderbeu Poroj
- Full name: Klubi Futbollistik Skënderbeu Poroj
- Founded: 1993; 33 years ago
- Ground: Stadion Poroj
- League: Macedonian Third League (Region 6)
- 2025–26: 10th

KF Skënderbeu Poroj (Macedonian: ФК Скендербег Порој, romanized: FK Skenderbeg Poroj) is a football club based in the village of Poroj, Tetovo, North Macedonia. They currently competing in the Macedonian Third League (Region 6).

== History ==
The club was founded in 1993.
