= Nikištane =

Nikištane Никиштане Nigishtan
- Village
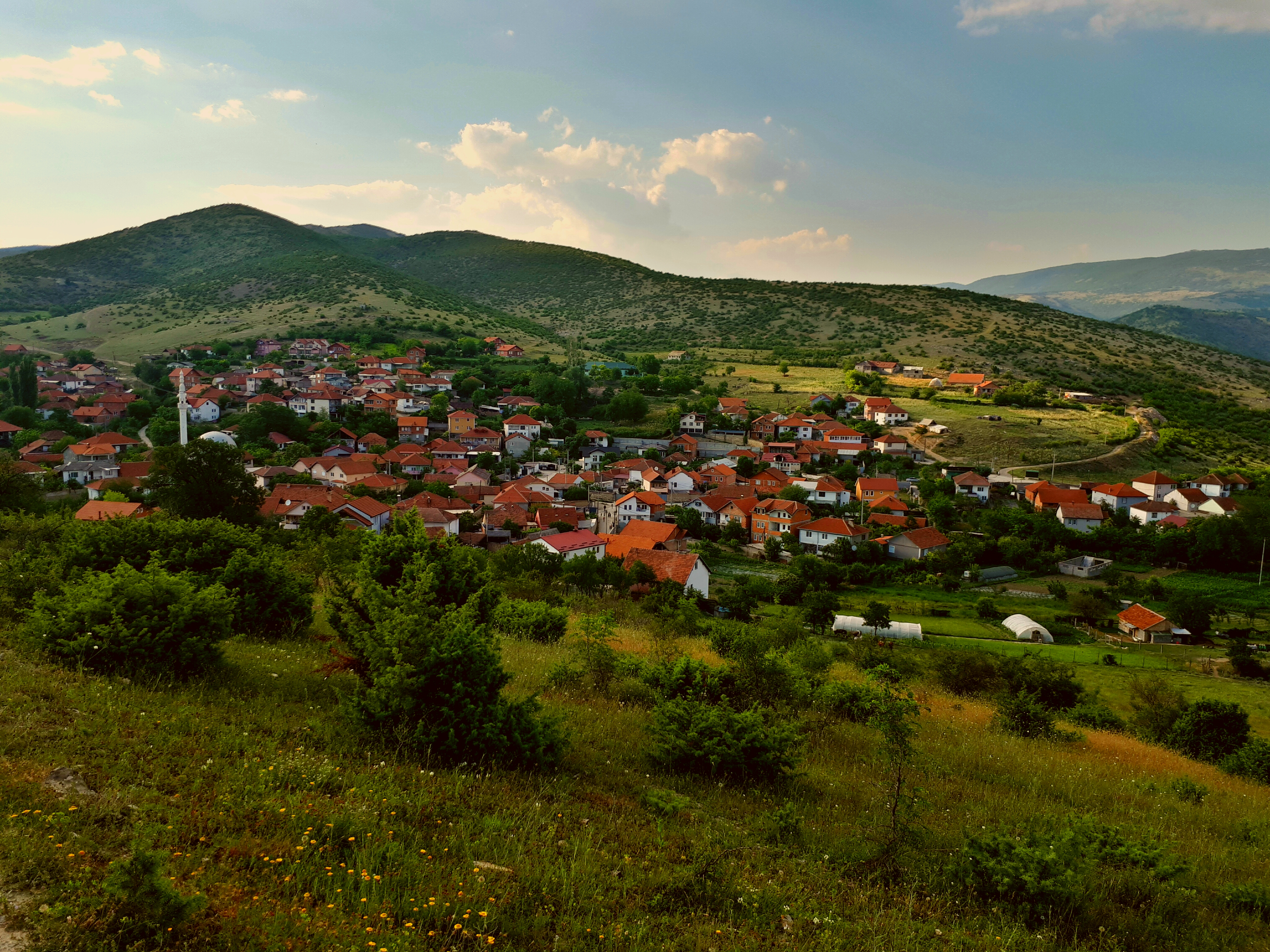

- Location within North Macedonia
- Coordinates: 42°04′N 21°20′E
- Country: North Macedonia
- Region: Skopje
- Municipality: Ǵorče Petrov

Population (2021)
  - Total: 1,127
- Time zone: UTC+1 (CET)
  - Summer (DST): UTC+2 (CEST)
- Postal code: 1060
- Car plates: SK
- Website: .

Nikištane (Macedonian: Никиштане, Albanian: Nigishtan) is a village in the municipality of Ǵorče Petrov, North Macedonia.

== Demographics ==
As of the 2021 census, Nikištane had 1,127 residents with the following ethnic composition:

- Albanians 1,084
- Persons for whom data are taken from administrative sources 43

According to the 2002 census, the village had a total of 1114 inhabitants. Ethnic groups in the village include:

- Albanians 1113
- Others 1
