= Želino =

Želino Желино Zhelinë
- Village
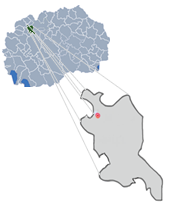
- Želino in Želino Municipality, in North Macdeonia

- Location in North Macedonia Location in Europe
- Coordinates: 41°59′N 21°04′E
- Country: North Macedonia
- Region: Polog
- Municipality: Želino

Population (2021)
  - Total: 3,432
- Time zone: UTC+1 (CET)
  - Summer (DST): UTC+2 (CEST)
- Vehicle registration: TE
- Website: .

Želino (Macedonian: Желино, Albanian: Zhelinë) is a village and seat of the municipality of Želino, North Macedonia.

== History ==
Želino is attested in the 1467/68 Ottoman tax registry (defter) for the Nahiyah of Kalkandelen. The village had a total of 60 Christian households, 3 bachelors and 2 widows.

According to the 1467-68 Ottoman defter, Želino exhibits an Orthodox Christian Slavic anthroponomy along with a presence of Albanian onomastics. Due to Slavicisation, some families had a mixed Slav-Albanian anthroponomy - usually a Slavic first name and an Albanian last name or last names with Albanian patronyms and Slavic suffixes

== Demographics ==
As of the 2021 census, Želino had 3,432 residents with the following ethnic composition:

- Albanians 3,340
- Persons for whom data are taken from administrative sources 91
- Others 1

According to the 2002 census, the village had a total of 4,110 inhabitants. Ethnic groups in the village include 4100 Albanians, one Bosniak, and nine others.

According to the 1942 Albanian census, Želino was inhabited by 1219 Muslim Albanians.

== Sports ==
Local football club KF Liria play in the OFS Tetovo league.
