= Pršovce =

Pršovce Пршовце Përshefcë
- Village
- Location within North Macedonia
- Coordinates: 42°05′N 21°04′E
- Country: North Macedonia
- Region: Polog
- Municipality: Tearce

Population (2021)
  - Total: 1,923
- Time zone: UTC+1 (CET)
  - Summer (DST): UTC+2 (CEST)
- Car plates: TE
- Website: .

Pršovce (Macedonian: Пршовце, Albanian: Përshec) is a village in the municipality of Tearce, North Macedonia.

== Name ==
The name appears in medieval records as Prushefc, from the Latin loan into Albanian pirus-prush and the Slavic suffix ovci/e.

== History ==
Pršovce is attested in the 1467/68 Ottoman tax registry (defter) for the Nahiyah of Kalkandelen. The village had a total of 61 Christian households, 3 bachelors and 3 widows.

According to the 1467-68 Ottoman defter, Pršovce exhibits mostly Slavic Orthodox anthroponomy with a small minority of Albanian ones.

== Demographics ==
As of the 2021 census, Pršovce had 1,923 residents with the following ethnic composition:

- Albanians 1,871
- Persons for whom data are taken from administrative sources 37
- Macedonians 11
- Others 4

According to the 2002 census, the village had a total of 2,516 inhabitants. Ethnic groups in the village include:

- Albanians 2478
- Macedonians 1
- Romani 6
- Serbs 1
- Others 29

In statistics gathered by Vasil Kanchov in 1900, the village of Pršovce was inhabited by 165 Muslim Albanians.
