= FK Rečica =

- Full name: Fudbalski klub Rečica
- Founded: 1950; 76 years ago
- Ground: Milutin Veljković Uča
- Capacity: 100
- Chairman: Valentin Stoilović
- Manager: Valentin Stoilović
- League: Macedonian Third League (Region 1)
- 2023–24: OFS Kumanovo, 3rd
Home colours

FK Rečica (Macedonian and Serbian Cyrillic: ФК Речица) is a football club of the Serbian community based in the village of Rečica near Kumanovo, North Macedonia. They are currently competing in the Macedonian Third League (Region 2).

== History ==
The club was founded in 1950.
