= FK Mogila =

Macedonian football club

FK Mogila 2023
- Full name: Football club Mogila / Фудбалски клуб Могила
- Founded: 2009; 17 years ago
- Ground: Stadion Dimche Sarvanov "Mogilcheto"
- Manager: Zlate Stojchevski
- League: Macedonian Third League (Region 5)
- 2025–26: Third League (Southwest), 2nd

Former club crest (2009–2023)

FK Mogila (Macedonian: ФК Могила) is a football club based in the village of Mogila near Bitola, Republic of North Macedonia. They are currently played in the Macedonian Third League.

== History ==
The club was founded in 2009.
