= FK Ilinden Skopje =

Ilinden Skopje
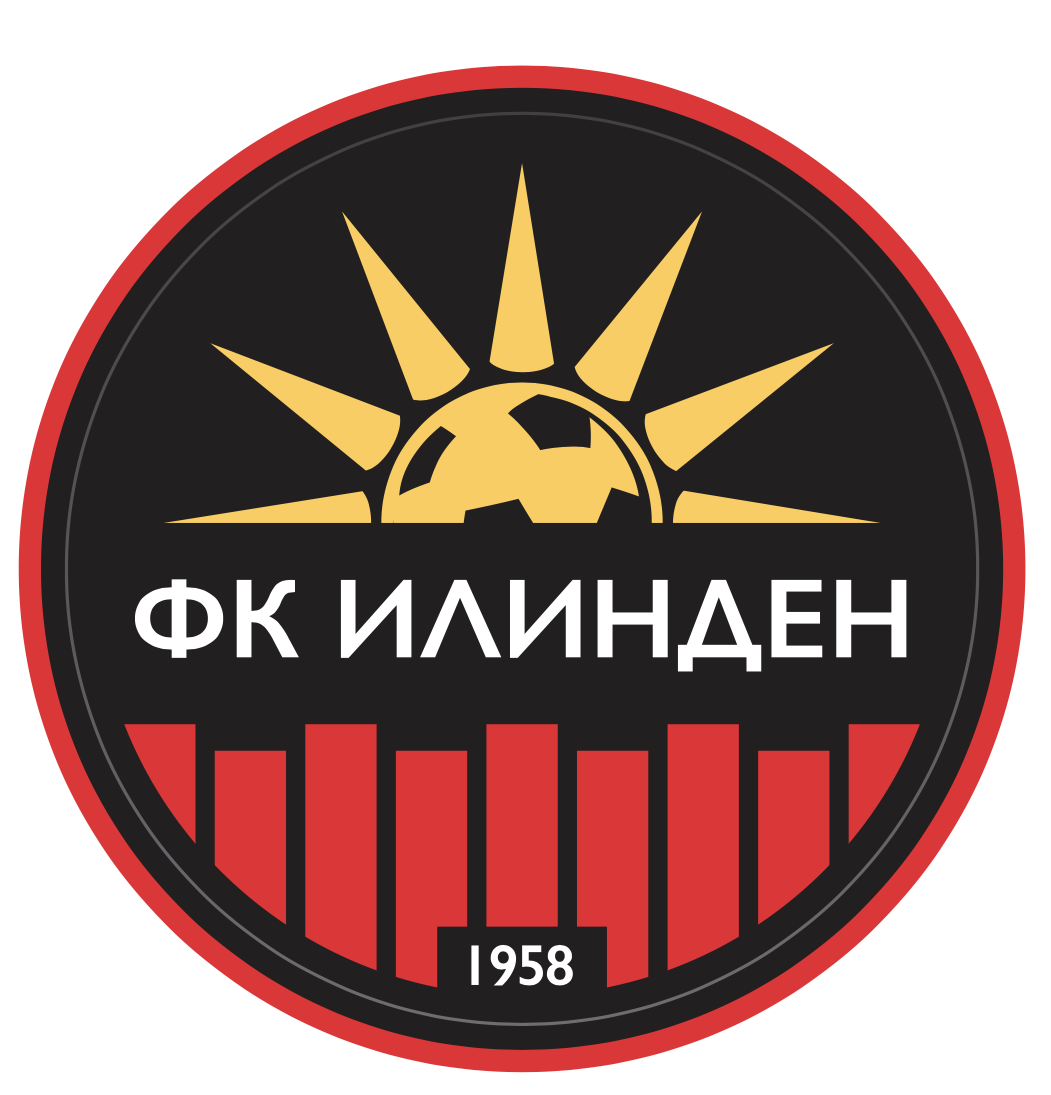
- Full name: Fudbalski Klub Ilinden Skopje
- Founded: 1958; 68 years ago
- Ground: Stadion Ilinden
- Capacity: 1.100
- Chairman: Gjoko Sterjoski
- Manager: Goran Simov
- 2026–27: Third League (Skopje region),
Home colours	Away colours

FK Ilinden Skopje (Macedonian: ФК Илинден Скопје) is a football club based in the Ilinden neighbourhood of Skopje, North Macedonia. They were recently competed in the Third Macedonian League (Skopje region). The club's home ground is Ilinden Stadium. FK Ilinden's traditional club colours are red and black, and the club is also known by the nickname "Volci" (Wolves). The club previously competed under the name Zadrugar.

== History ==
FK Ilinden was founded in 1958 in the settlement of Ilinden, near Skopje. Throughout its history, the club has participated in regional and national football competitions in North Macedonia.

One of the most important periods in the club's history came during the 1994–95 season, when Ilinden won the Macedonian Third Football League – North-Polog division, earning promotion to the Second Macedonian Football League.

The 1995–96 season remains one of the most significant seasons in the club's history, as FK Ilinden competed in the Macedonian Second Football League – West. The club faced teams including Shkëndija Tetovo, Teteks, Rabotnichki Kometal, Skopje, Gostivar and other established clubs from the region. Ilinden was relegated at the end of the season.

The club's participation in the Second League is also documented by historical records from the Municipality of Ilinden. The team that competed in the 1995–96 season included a number of local players and was coached by Zoran Bozhinovski.

Following its Second League period, FK Ilinden continued competing in the lower levels of Macedonian football, including the Third Macedonian Football League and regional competitions..

== Stadium ==
FK Ilinden plays its home matches at Ilinden Stadium, located in the municipality of Ilinden near Skopje.

The stadium has historically served as the home venue of the club and has undergone improvements over the years. Current football databases list the stadium's planned capacity at approximately 1,100 spectators, with modernization works underway.

== Honours ==
Domestic Macedonian Third Football League – North-Polog Winners: 1994–95

Best league performance Macedonian Second Football League: 1995–96

The 1994–95 Third League championship and subsequent participation in the Second League in 1995–96 represent the club's most notable competitive achievements.
