= FK Rosoman 83 =

ФК Росоман 83 FK Rosoman 83
- Full name: Fudbalski klub Rosoman 83
- Founded: 1983; 43 years ago
- Ground: Stadion Rosoman
- League: Macedonian Third League (Region 4)
- 2025–26: 7th
Home colours

FK Rosoman 83 (Macedonian: ФК Росоман 83) is a football club based in the town of Rosoman, near Kavadarci, North Macedonia. They are currently competing in the Macedonian Third League (Region 4).

== History ==
The club was founded in 1983.

In club's history Rosoman 83 competed in the Macedonian Second League. On 24 April 2020, 26-year old club captain Sashko Gelov died of his injuries sustained in a car accident a few days earlier.
