= KF Liria Zhelinë =

Liria Zhelinë 1988
- Full name: Klubi Futbollistik Liria Zhelinë
- Founded: 1988; 38 years ago
- Ground: Zhelinë Stadium
- Manager: Rasim Kadriu
- League: Macedonian Third League (Region 6)
- 2014–15: Macedonian Third League (West), 8th (relegated)

KF Liria Zhelinë (Macedonian: ФК Лирија Желино, FK Lirija Želino) is a football club based in the village of Zhelinë near Tetovo, North Macedonia. They are currently competing in the Macedonian Third League (Region 6).

== History ==
The club was founded in 1988.
