= FK Bair Krkardaš =

- Full name: Fudbalski klub Bair Krkardaš
- Founded: 1992; 34 years ago
- Ground: Stadion Logovardi
- Capacity: 1,000
- League: Macedonian Third League (Region 5)

FK Bair Krkardaš (Macedonian: ФК Баир Кркардаш) is a football club based in the city of Bitola, North Macedonia. They are currently competing in the Macedonian Third League (Region 5).

== History ==
The club was founded in 1992.
