= FK Alumina =

- Full name: Fudbalski klub Alumina Skopje
- Founded: 1950; 75 years ago
- Dissolved: 2013; 12 years ago
- Ground: Stadion Makedonija
- Capacity: 1,000
- League: none
- 2012–13: Macedonian Third League (North), 10th
Home colours	Away colours

FK Alumina (Macedonian: ФК Алумина) is a football club from Skopje, North Macedonia. The club has played in the 2012/13 season Macedonian Third League.

== History ==
The club was founded in 1950. The administration of Bregalnica from Štip took control of Alumina in the summer of 2008. Since the club's name has been changed and operate by FK Bregalnica Štip.
