= FK Jildirimspor =

- Full name: Fudbalski klub Jildirimspor
- Founded: 1965
- Ground: Gradski stadion Resen
- Capacity: 1,500
- League: OFL Resen

FK Jildirimspor (Macedonian: ФК Јилдиримспор; Turkish: FK Yıldırımspor) is a football club based in the town of Resen, North Macedonia. They currently play in the OFL Resen.

== History ==
Logo as Bratstvo Resen

The club was founded in 1965.

The club one time in which the remembered playing in the Macedonian Second League was named Bratstvo Resen.
