= KF Vllaznimi Struga =

KF Vllaznimi Strugë
- Full name: Klubi Futbollistik Vllaznimi Strugë
- Nickname: Patriotët (Patriots)
- Founded: 1947; 79 years ago
- Ground: Stadion Plitishta
- Chairman: Naser Sinani
- Manager: Fiat Shate
- League: Macedonian Third League (Region 5)
- 2025–26: 1st
Home colours	Away colours

KF Vllaznimi (Macedonian: ФК Влазними) is a football club based in Struga, North Macedonia. The club currently competes in the Macedonian Third League (Region 5).

== History ==
In 1947 a group of young enthusiasts began activities to found a football club, where they could play during holidays and organize tournaments. Unanimously they decided to represent themselves by the name of the Albanian hero "Emin Duraku". In 1974 for political reasons, they gave the club a new name KF "Vllaznimi" meaning brotherhood. Since then the name "Vllaznimi" remains as it is. The club's official colors are blue and they have been like that since they were first formed. Chairman of this club is Naser Sinani, and currently the club is managed by Fiat Shate.

== Notable players ==
- (North Macedonia) (Albania) Isnik Alimi
- (North Macedonia) (Albania) Egzon Belica
