= FK Tiverija =

- Full name: Fudbalski klub Tiverija Strumica
- Nickname: Ајакс (Ajax)
- Founded: 1923; 103 years ago
- Ground: Stadion Blagoj Istatov
- Capacity: 6,500
- League: Macedonian Third League (Region 3)
- 2025–26: 7th
Home colours	Away colours	Third colours

FK Tiverija (Macedonian: ФК Тиверија) is a football club based in the city of Strumica, North Macedonia. They are currently competing in the Macedonian Third League (Region 3).

== History ==
The club was founded in 1923.
