= Nov Dojran =

Nov Dojran Нов Дојран
- Village
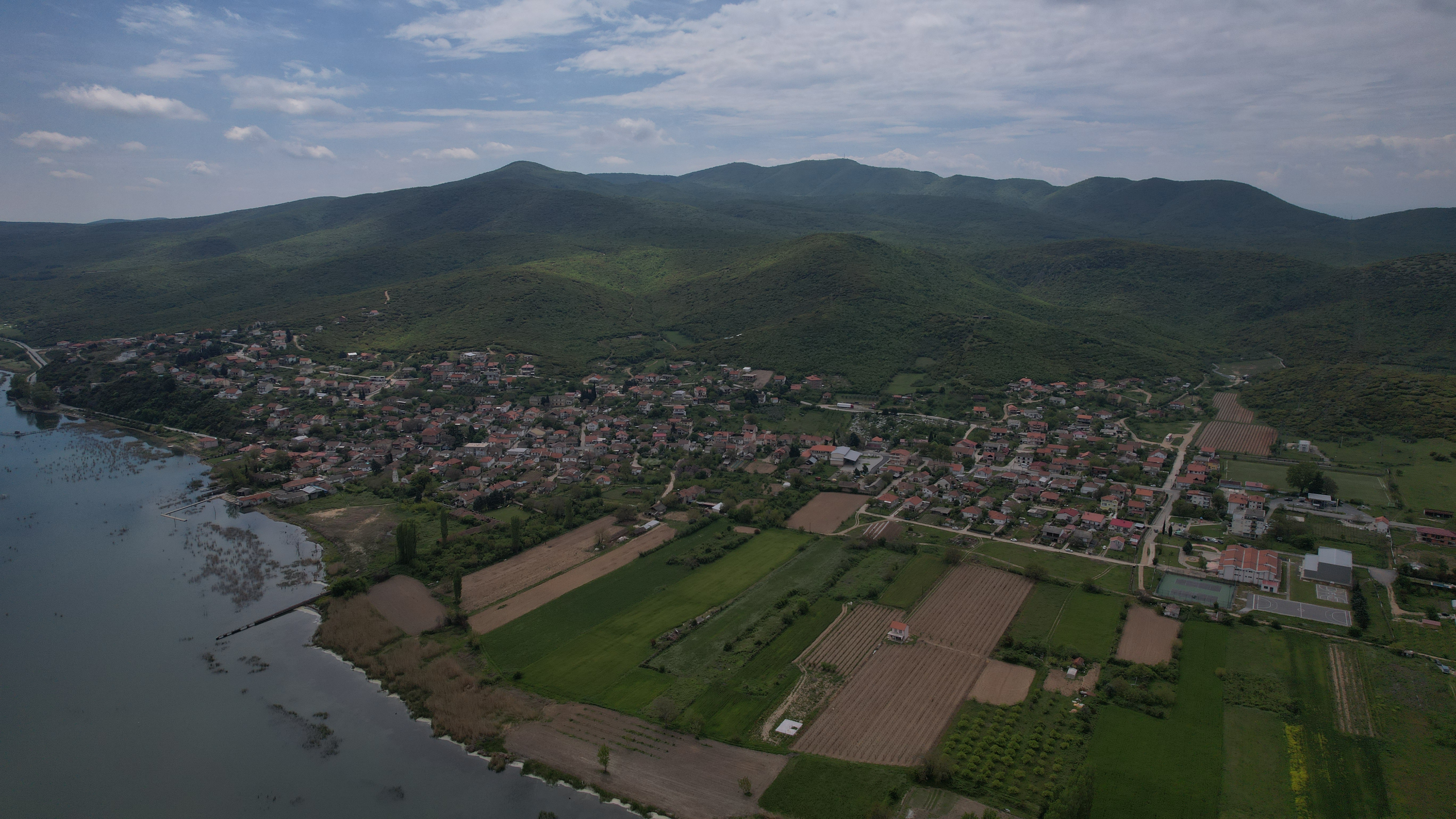
- Air view of the village Nov Dojran

- Location within North Macedonia
- Coordinates: 41°13′14″N 22°44′18″E
- Country: North Macedonia
- Region: Southeastern
- Municipality: Dojran

Population (2021)
  - Total: 997
- Time zone: UTC+1 (CET)
  - Summer (DST): UTC+2 (CEST)
- Area code: +389 34
- Car plates: GE
- Climate: Cfb

Nov Dojran (Macedonian: Нов Дојран) is a village in the southeastern part of North Macedonia. It is part of the municipality of Dojran. Nov Dojran means "New Dojran" in Macedonian.

It is located on the banks of Doiran Lake, near the Greek border.

== Demographics ==
According to the 2002 census, the settlement had a total of 1100 inhabitants. Ethnic groups in the village include:

- Macedonians 1023
- Serbs 27
- Turks 23
- Romani 14
- Albanians 11
- Bosniaks 1
- Others 1

As of 2021, the village of Nov Dojran has 997 inhabitants and the ethnic composition was the following:

- Macedonians – 935
- Turks – 10
- Serbs – 10
- others – 3
- Person without Data - 39

== Sports ==
The local football club FK Dojransko Ezero plays in the Macedonian Third Football League.
