= FK Svetlost Kukurečani =

FK Svetlost Kukurechani
- Full name: Fudbalski klub Svetlost Kukurechani
- Founded: 1949; 76 years ago
- Ground: Stadion Svetlost
- 2024–25: Third League (Southwest), 12th (withdrew)

FK Svetlost Kukurechani (Macedonian: ФК Светлост Кукуречани) is a football club based in the village Kukurechani near Bitola, North Macedonia. They are recently competed in the Macedonian Third League (Southwest Division).

== History ==
The club was founded in 1949. Their biggest accomplishment was playing in the Macedonian Second League.
