= FK Golemo Konjari =

- Full name: Fudbalski klub Golemo Konjari
- Founded: 1963
- Stadium: Stadion Golemo Konjari
- Capacity: 300
- Chairman: Gorancho Kasnioski
- Manager: Zoran Danoski
- League: Macedonian Third League (Region 4)
- 2025–26: Macedonian Second League, 16th (relegated)

FK Golemo Konjari (Macedonian: ФК Големо Коњари) is a football club based in village of Golemo Konjari near Prilep, North Macedonia. They are currently competing in the Macedonian Third League (Region 4).

== History ==
Back in the past, the club used to play in the Macedonian Second League as Bratstvo .

== Current squad ==
As of 20 September 2025.

Note: Flags indicate national team as defined under FIFA eligibility rules; some limited exceptions apply. Players may hold more than one non-FIFA nationality.

No.	Pos.	Nation	Player
1	GK	MKD	Antonio Shemkoski
2	DF	MKD	Viktor Tosheski
3	DF	MKD	Miho Andreevski
4	DF	MKD	Kiril Invanoski
5	DF	MKD	Valentin Beleski
6	MF	MKD	Onur Imeroski
7	FW	MKD	Erdzhan Ibraimoski
8	MF	MKD	Borche Srkeski
9	FW	MKD	Bekim Alimoski
10	MF	MKD	Ilcho Mitreski
11	DF	MKD	Nikolaj Danoski

No.	Pos.	Nation	Player
12	GK	MKD	Dushan Aceski
13	MF	MKD	Vladimir Beshovski
15	MF	MKD	Bojan Joveski
16	MF	MKD	Filip Stojanoski
17	MF	MKD	Darko Chapkunoski
18	FW	MKD	Stefan Bonchanoski
19	FW	MKD	Amil Tabakovikj
20	DF	MKD	Valentino Bozhinoski
21	DF	MKD	Emir Karishikj
22	MF	MKD	Nermin Karishikj
23	GK	MKD	Andrej Dimitrijeski
