= FK Dojransko Ezero =

Dojransko Ezero
- Full name: FK Dojransko Ezero
- Founded: 1978; 48 years ago
- Ground: Sportski Centar Istatov
- Capacity: 500
- Chairman: Ice Dzinev
- Manager: Vane Ajcev
- League: Macedonian Third League (Region 3)
- 2025–26: 9th
Home colours	Away colours

FK Dojransko Ezero (Macedonian: ФК Дојранско Езеро) is a football club based in the town of Nov Dojran, North Macedonia. They are currently competing in the Macedonian Third League (Region 3).

== History ==
The club was founded in 1978. Their biggest accomplishment was playing in the Macedonian Second League.
