= KF Korabi Debar =

Football club

KF Korabi ФК Кораби FK Korabi
- Full name: Klubi Futbollistik Korabi Dibër; Фудбалски клуб Кораби Дебар (Fudbalski Klub Korabi Debar)
- Founded: 1921; 105 years ago
- Ground: Gradski Stadion Debar
- Capacity: 5,000
- Chairman: Habib Kllobocishta
- Manager: Bobi Stojkovski
- League: Macedonian Third League (Region 6)
- 2025–26: 8th
Home colours	Away colours

KF Korabi (Macedonian: ФК Кораби, FK Korabi or known by its old name as ФК Кораб, FK Korab) is a football club based in Debar, North Macedonia. They are currently competing in the Macedonian Third League (Region 6).

== History ==
The club was founded in 1921.

They won the Macedonian Third League West title in the 2010–11 season.

Korabi are the winter champions and in first place for the first half of the 2017–18 season.

Korabi won the 2017-2018 Third league Southwest and received automatic promotion to the Macedonian Second League West for 2018–19.

== Current squad ==
As of 15 February 2021

Note: Flags indicate national team as defined under FIFA eligibility rules; some limited exceptions apply. Players may hold more than one non-FIFA nationality.

No.	Pos.	Nation	Player
1	GK	MKD	Mugni Opre
2		MKD	Visar Ceku
4	MF	MKD	Rihan Zeqiri
5		MKD	Engjel Tochi
6	MF	MKD	Metin Rushiti
7		MKD	Amin Kacallniku
9		MKD	Bleron Mucha
10		MKD	Drilon Koleci
13	MF	MKD	Azdren Mena
14		MKD	Trim Ambari

No.	Pos.	Nation	Player
15	FW	MKD	Ylber Beqiri
17	FW	MKD	Alban Rasimi
50	DF	MKD	Antonio Ilieski
77	DF	MKD	Fatjon Lleshi
—	GK	MKD	Valon Neziri
—	MF	MKD	Armend Aliu
—	FW	MKD	Murat Adili
—	FW	MKD	Mergim Dani
—		MKD	Enis Sadiki

== List of managers ==
- (North Macedonia) Mensur Nexhipi (11 September 2018 – 2019)
