= FK Udarnik Pirava =

- Full name: Fudbalski Klub Udarnik Pirava
- Founded: 1929; 97 years ago
- Ground: Stadion Gjorge Djonov
- League: Macedonian Third League (Region 3)
- 2025–26: 3rd

FK Udarnik Pirava (Macedonian: ФК Ударник Пирава) is a football club based in the village of Pirava near Valandovo, North Macedonia. They are currently competing in the Macedonian Third League (Region 3).

== History ==
The club was founded in 1929. Their biggest accomplishment was playing in the Macedonian Second League.
