= Pirava =

Pirava Пирава
- Village
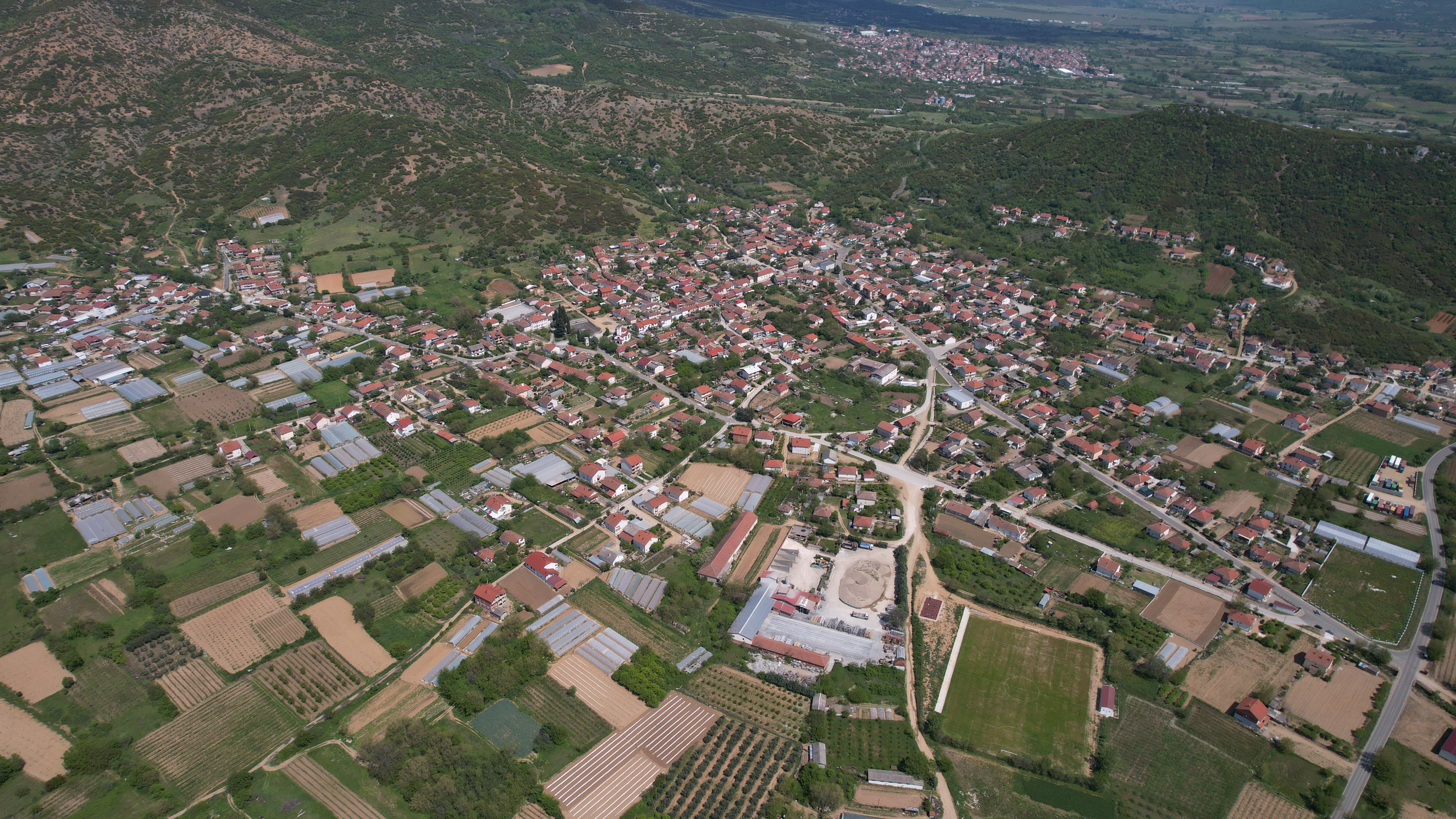
- Air view of the village

- Location within North Macedonia
- Coordinates: 41.320692°N 22.531402°E
- Country: North Macedonia
- Region: Southeastern
- Municipality: Valandovo

Population (2021)
  - Total: 1,586
- Time zone: UTC+1 (CET)
  - Summer (DST): UTC+2 (CEST)
- Website: .

Pirava (Macedonian: Пирава) is a village in the municipality of Valandovo, North Macedonia.

== Demographics ==
According to the 2002 census, the village had a total of 1844 inhabitants. Ethnic groups in the village include:

- Macedonians: 1834
- Romani: 2
- Serbs: 8
- Others: 2

As of 2021, the village of Pirava has 1.586 inhabitants and the ethnic composition was the following:

- Macedonians – 1.505
- Romani - 5
- Albanians – 2
- Serbs – 4
- others – 7
- Person without Data - 63
