= FK Sloga 1934 Vinica =

Sloga 1934 Vinica
- Full name: Fudbalski Klub Sloga 1934 Vinica
- Founded: 1934; 92 years ago /restored 2012/
- Ground: Stadion Filip II
- Capacity: 2,000
- Chairman: Dejan Mihajlov
- Manager: Emil Grnev
- League: Macedonian Third League (Region 3)
- 2025–26: Macedonian Second League, 14th (relegated)
Home colours	Away colours

FK Sloga 1934 (Macedonian: ФК Слога 1934) is a football club based in Vinica, North Macedonia. They are currently competing in the Macedonian Third League (Region 3).

== History ==
Sloga Vinica Logo

The club was founded in 1934 as "FK Makedonija Vinica". In 1939, the name was changed to "FK Pakos Vinica" and in 1941 to "FK Plačkovica Vinica". From 1950 the club was named "FK Sloga Vinica" until its collapse in 2009. In 2012 the club was refounded under the current name, "FK Sloga 1934 Vinica" from Zoran Vasevski, Angelcho Goshev, Kiro Kurchiski, Blagoj Dimitrov and Petar Arsov.

In 2001, the club played in the Macedonian Second League, where they placed fourth. However, in the next season (2001–02), the club placed 16th, causing them to be relegated to the Macedonian Third League – East.

== Supporters ==
In 1989, the club formed the supporters group called Ulavi. After the club was re-established, the number of club fans totaled to about 1,500 members.

== Honours and Club best position ==
(North Macedonia) Macedonian Second League:

- Runners-up (1): 1999–2000
- 3rd (1): 2021–2022

== Current squad ==
As of 1 December 2025.

Note: Flags indicate national team as defined under FIFA eligibility rules; some limited exceptions apply. Players may hold more than one non-FIFA nationality.

No.	Pos.	Nation	Player
2	DF	MKD	Andrej Voinov
5	DF	MKD	Dragoslav Zdravkov
6	MF	MKD	Andrej Donchev
7	FW	MKD	Oktay Amedov
8	FW	MKD	Martin Pejchinov
9	FW	MKD	Mihail Voinov
11	MF	MKD	Robert Pecov
12	GK	MKD	Maksim Kraljevski

No.	Pos.	Nation	Player
13	MF	MKD	Filip Danev
14	FW	MKD	Nikola Naumov
15	DF	MKD	Aleksandar Iliev
18	MF	MKD	Bulent Sali
20	FW	MKD	Bojan Kolishev
21	FW	MKD	Hristijan Ristov
23	MF	MKD	David Spasov
30	GK	MKD	Igorcho Danev
