= Macedonian Third Football League =

Macedonian Third League Македонска трета лига
- Founded: 1992
- Country: North Macedonia
- Confederation: UEFA
- Divisions: 6
- Level on pyramid: 3
- Promotion to: 2. MFL
- Relegation to: Macedonian Municipal Leagues
- Domestic cup: Macedonian Football Cup
- Current champions: Euromilk (North); Borec (South); Pobeda Valandovo (East); Kamjani (West); Vllaznimi (Southwest)
- Website: ffm.mk
- Current: 2026–27 Macedonian Third Football League

The Macedonian Third League (Macedonian: Македонска трета лига) is the third highest football competition in North Macedonia.

From the 2026–27 season, the competition will be divided into six regional groups. At the end of the season, the winners of the divisions will play in a play-off for promotion to the Macedonian Second League. The bottom teams from all divisions are relegated to the Macedonian Municipal Leagues.

== Winners ==
Key

†	Club gained promotion to the unified Second League
^{W}	Club gained promotion to Second League West
^{E}	Club gained promotion to Second League East

=== 1992–1994 ===
Season	North	South	East	West
1992–93	Tehnokom Gorno Lisiche ^{W}	Varosh ^{E}	Turija Turnovo ^{E}	Pitu Guli ^{W}
1993–94	Shkëndija ^{W}	Zheleznichar Bogomila ^{E}	Plachkovica ^{E}	Suvenir ^{W}

=== 1994–2000 ===
Season	North-Polog	Kozjak	South	East	Pelagonia	Lakeside
1994–95	Ilinden Skopje ^{W}	Rabotnik Djumajlija ^{E}	Kavadarci ^{E}	Malesh ^{E}	Svetlost Kukurechani ^{W}	Flamurtari Radolishta ^{W}
1995–96	Jugohrom ^{W}	Karposh 93 ^{E}	Gaber ^{E}	Sloga Vinica ^{E}	11 Oktomvri ^{W}	Vevchani ^{W}
1996–97	Alumina ^{W}	Ovche Pole ^{E}	Rosoman 83 ^{E}	Astibo ^{E}	Proleter Makedonski Brod ^{W}	Vllaznimi ^{W}
1997–98	Gostivar ^{W}	Besa-Vlazrimi ^{E}	Udarnik Pirava ^{E}	Tiverija ^{E}	Demir Hisar ^{W}	Veleshta ^{W}
1998–99	Butel ^{W}	Karposh 93 ^{E}	Dojransko Ezero ^{E}	Belo Brdo ^{E}	Mariovo ^{W}	Voska ^{W}
1999–00	Drita	Mesna Industrija †	Rosoman 83	Mladost GT Orizari †	11 Oktomvri †	Vëllazërimi

=== 2000–2004 ===
Season	North	South	East	Southwest	Also promoted
2000–01	Drita †	Kozhuf †	Turnovo †	Makedonija Vranishta †	
2001–02	Madjari Solidarnost †	Pobeda Valandovo †	Bregalnica Shtip †	Vëllazërimi †	
2002–03	Skopje †	Metalurg Veles^{[1]}	Zletovica †	Bratstvo Resen †	Lozar †^{[1]}
2003–04	Renova †	Vardar Negotino	Mladost Sushica †	Dollogozhda	

=== 2004–2017 ===
Season	North	South	East	West	Southwest	Also promoted
2004–05	Metalurg Skopje †	Lozar †	Osogovo	Drita	Karaorman †	
2005–06	Milano †	Kozhuf †	Tiverija	Gostivar	Ilinden Velmej †	
2006–07	Alumina †	Miravci †	Nov Milenium †	Drita †	Ohrid †	Lokomotiva †^{[2]}
2007–08	Lepenec	Kozhuf †	Osogovo	Ljuboten	Novaci †	
2008–09	Lepenec (A)	11 Oktomvri †	Osogovo	Vëllazërimi †	Vllaznimi †	
2008–09	Ilinden Skopje (B)	11 Oktomvri †	Osogovo	Vëllazërimi †	Vllaznimi †	
2009–10	Gorno Lisiche (A) †	Tikvesh †	Osogovo	Rinia †	Ohrid Lote †	
2009–10	Rashtak (B)	Tikvesh †	Osogovo	Rinia †	Ohrid Lote †	
2010–11	Treska (A) †	Pobeda Junior †	Osogovo †	Rufeja †	Korabi †	
2010–11	Madjari Solidarnost (B)	Pobeda Junior †	Osogovo †	Rufeja †	Korabi †	
2011–12	Madjari Solidarnost †	Korzo †	Bregalnica Delchevo	Vrapchishte †	Novaci †	Babi †^{[3]}
2012–13	Shkupi †^{[4]}	Borec †	Tiverija †	Zajazi †	Korabi	
2013–14	Goblen	Vardar Negotino	Belasica	Vëllazërimi †^{[5]}	Mladost Carev Dvor †	
2014–15	Ljubanci 1974 †	Pobeda †	Belasica	Zajazi	Veleshta	
2015–16	Goblen	Vardar Negotino †	Akademija Pandev †	Vardari Forino	Novaci †^{[6]}	Tikvesh †^{[7]}
2016–17	Lokomotiva ^{W}	Kozhuf ^{E}	Belasica ^{E}	Gostivar ^{W}	Struga ^{W}	Borec ^{E}, Labunishta ^{W}, Osogovo ^{E}, Plachkovica ^{E}, Pobeda Valandovo ^{E}, Sasa ^{E}, Zajazi ^{W}

=== 2017–2020 ===
Season	North	Center	Southeast	East	West	Southwest	Also promoted
2017–18	Goblen ^{W}	Partizan Obrshani ^{E}	Detonit Junior ^{E}	Kit-Go Pehchevo ^{E}	Genç Kalemler ^{W}	Korabi ^{W}	Vardar Negotino ^{E}
2018–19	Kadino ^{W}	Pitu Guli ^{E}	Dojransko Ezero^{[8]}	Osogovo ^{E}	Drita ^{W}	Ohrid ^{W}	Vardari Forino ^{W}
2019–20^{[10]}	Fortuna	Rosoman 83 ^{E}	Sloga 1934 ^{E}	Not held	Besa (DD)	Veleshta ^{W}	Teteks ^{W}^{[9]}

=== 2020–2026 ===
Season	North	South	East	West	Southwest	Also promoted
2020–21^{[10]}	Fortuna	Lokomotiva (G) ^{E}	Detonit ^{E}	Besa (DD) ^{W}	Voska Sport ^{W}	Bratstvo 07 ^{E}
2021–22	Not held	Vardar Negotino	Ovche Pole	Arsimi †	Karaorman †	Lokomotiva †^{[11]}
2022–23	Bashkimi †	Vardar Negotino †	Osogovo †	Vëllazërimi J 1977	Novaci †	
2023–24	Kumanovo	Borec †	Vardarski †	Vëllazërimi J 1977	Korabi	
2024–25	Shkëndija Haraçinë †	Golemo Konjari †	Sloga 1934 Vinica †	Teteks †	Prespa †	
2025–26	Euromilk Gorno Lisiche †	Borec	Pobeda Valandovo	Kamjani †	Vllaznimi	

=== 2026–present ===
Season	Region 1	Region 2	Region 3	Region 4	Region 5	Region 6
2026–27						

== Teams ==
=== Region 1 ===
- 1 Aerodrom
- 2 BVK Konjari
- 3 Bashkimi Ljuboten
- 4 Besa Saraj
- 5 Cool Skopje
- 6 Fortuna
- 7 Ilinden Skopje
- 8 Marino
- 9 New Stars
- 10 Perparimi Nikishtane
- 11 R'zhanichino
- 12 Studenichane

=== Region 2 ===
- 1 Akademija Osogovo
- 2 Besa Slupchane
- 3 Junior Dobroshane
- 4 Kozjak Staro Nagorichane
- 5 Kumanovo
- 6 Likova
- 7 Pchinja 2015
- 8 Pobeda Tromegja
- 9 Rechica
- 10 Vllaznimi Orizari

=== Region 3 ===
- 1 Bregalnica Delchevo
- 2 Dojransko Ezero
- 3 Horizont Turnovo
- 4 Karbinci
- 5 Malesh
- 6 Ograzhden
- 7 Ovche Pole
- 8 Pobeda Valandovo
- 9 Sasa
- 10 Sloga 1934 Vinica
- 11 Tiverija
- 12 Udarnik Pirava

=== Region 4 ===
- 1 Bashkimi Gorno Jabolchishte
- 2 Borec
- 3 Buchin
- 4 Golemo Konjari
- 5 Mlekar
- 6 Pitu Guli
- 7 Pobeda Pepelishte
- 8 Pobeda Prilep
- 9 Prevalec
- 10 Rosoman 83
- 11 Ultras Prilep
- 12 Vardar Negotino
- 13 Venec Dolni Disan
- 14 Vlaznimi Junior Presil

=== Region 5 ===
- 1 Bair Sport Krkardash
- 2 Chardak Velgoshti
- 3 Demir Hisar
- 4 Karaorman
- 5 Kravari
- 6 Kroschu Sport
- 7 Mogila
- 8 Napredok Kichevo
- 9 Napredok Noshpal
- 10 Prespa
- 11 Sv. Troica
- 12 Vlazerimi J 1977 Kichevo
- 13 Vlaznimi Struga

=== Region 6 ===
- 1 Cetinska
- 2 Dobroshte
- 3 Drita 94
- 4 Gostivar
- 5 Gradec
- 6 Jehona 96 Prshovce
- 7 Korabi
- 8 Liria Zhelino
- 9 Ljuboten
- 10 Rechica Gorna Rechica
- 11 Skenderbeu Poroj
- 12 Vardar Brvenica
- 13 Xhepçishti

== Notes ==
1. ^{a} : Metalurg Veles was withdraw from the Second League days before the start of the season, their place was taken by Lozar.
2. ^{a} : Lokomotiva was promoted after the win in the additional play-off match against Korabi because was the Second League expanded after the play-off chaos.
3. ^{a} : Babi was promoted because Bregalnica Delchevo was rejected the promotion.
4. ^{a} : Shkupi was lost promotion play-offs, but due to the merger with Korzo the club was promoted.
5. ^{a} : Vëllazërimi was lost promotion play-offs, but due to the merger with Vrapčište the club was promoted.
6. ^{a} : Novaci was lost promotion play-offs, but due to the withdrawal of Mladost Carev Dvor from the Second League the club was promoted.
7. ^{a} : Tikvesh was promoted due to the withdrawal of Ljubanci from the Second League.
8. ^{a} : Dojransko Ezero was rejected the promotion to the Second League - East.
9. ^{a} : Teteks was promoted due to the merger with Labunishta.
10. ^{a} : The 2019–20 and 2020–21 seasons were abandoned due to the COVID-19 pandemic in North Macedonia.
11. ^{a} : Lokomotiva was promoted due to the withdrawal of Pehchevo from the Second League.
