= FK Novaci =

- Full name: Fudbalski klub Novaci
- Founded: 1956
- Ground: Stadion Novaci
- Capacity: 500
- Manager: Igor Stojkoski
- League: Macedonian Second League
- 2025–26: 7th
Home colours	Away colours

FK Novaci (Macedonian: ФК Новаци) is a football club based in the village Novaci near Bitola, North Macedonia. They are currently competing in the Macedonian Second League.

== History ==
The club was founded in 1956.

For many years, the club was competing in the Second Macedonian Football League. The club colors are blue and yellow.

Formerly, the club was called "Jugotutun".

== Current squad ==
As of 15 September 2026.

Note: Flags indicate national team as defined under FIFA eligibility rules; some limited exceptions apply. Players may hold more than one non-FIFA nationality.

No.	Pos.	Nation	Player
1	GK	MKD	Nikolche Simonovski
7	MF	MKD	Martin Andonovski
8	MF	MKD	Jovancho Trajkoski
9	FW	MKD	Nikola Taleski
10	DF	MKD	Hristijan Dragarski
11	DF	MKD	Stefan Spirovski
12	GK	MKD	Kristijano Miloshevski
13	MF	MKD	Darko Stojanovski
14	DF	MKD	Martin Dimoski
15	DF	MKD	Hristijan Torneski

No.	Pos.	Nation	Player
17	DF	MKD	Martin Pivkovski
18	MF	MKD	Stefan Jovanovski
19	MF	MKD	Dario Tushe Stojanovski
22	MF	MKD	Antonio Marcevski
23	DF	MKD	Mihail Milevski
27	MF	MKD	Gorjan Gruevski
29	DF	MKD	Ivancho Jovanovski
30	GK	MKD	David Drango
33	MF	MKD	Adrijan Veleski
99	FW	MKD	Andrej Siljanovski
