= FK Bregalnica Delčevo (1926–2012) =

Football club

Bregalnica Delčevo
- Full name: Fudbalski klub Bregalnica Delčevo
- Nickname(s): Брега (Brega)
- Founded: 1926
- Dissolved: 2014
- Ground: Gradski stadion Goce Delčev
- Capacity: 4,000
Home colours	Away colours

FK Bregalnica Delčevo (Macedonian: ФК Брегалница Делчево) was a football club based in Delčevo, Republic of Macedonia.

== History ==
The club was founded in 1926.

In summer 2014, the club ceased to exist as no sponsor wanted to help.

A successor club which claims rights to Bregalnica Delčevo's honours and records was established in same year as Bregalnica Golak. However, they are not legally considered to be successors to the original Bregalnica Delchevo and the two clubs' track records and honours are kept separate by the Football Federation of North Macedonia.

== Supporters ==
Bregalnica Delčevo supporters were called Aramii.
