= FK Prespa =

- Full name: Fudbalski klub Prespa Resen
- Founded: 10 July 1919; 107 years ago
- Ground: City Stadium Resen
- Capacity: 2,000
- Chairman: Jovančo Rajčanovski
- League: Macedonian Third League (Region 5)
- 2025–26: Macedonian Second League, 12th (relegated)
Home colours	Away colours

FK Prespa (Macedonian: ФК Преспа; Albanian: KF Prespa) is a football club based in Resen, Republic of North Macedonia. They are currently competing in the Macedonian Third League (Region 5).

== History ==
The club was founded in 1919. The club's first match was played on 12 July of the same year, in red shirts. The opponent was a team Royal Yugoslav Army assembled from the military garrison that was in Resen. That game ended with a 2-0 victory for Prespa.

On September 2019, an event was held to mark the centenary of the club.

== Players ==
=== Current squad ===
As of 1 December 2025.

Note: Flags indicate national team as defined under FIFA eligibility rules; some limited exceptions apply. Players may hold more than one non-FIFA nationality.

No.	Pos.	Nation	Player
1	GK	MKD	Hristijan Srkeski
3	MF	MKD	Amir Fejzulai
4	DF	MKD	Pece Naumovski
5	DF	MKD	Dejan Gruevski
6	DF	MKD	Andrej Murgovski
7	MF	MKD	Ledion Sulejmani
8	FW	MKD	Elmaz Emush
9	FW	MKD	Boban Kuzmanovski
10	FW	MKD	Niko Plastinovski

No.	Pos.	Nation	Player
11	MF	MKD	Aleksandar Popovski
12	GK	MKD	Goce Angjelovski
13	MF	MKD	Kiprijan Petreski
14	MF	MKD	Fikri Dani
15	DF	MKD	Stefan Spirovski
16	FW	MKD	Nikola Ugrinoski
17	DF	MKD	Oliver Kolovski
18	MF	MKD	David Karamachoski
21	GK	MKD	Nikolche Petrovski

=== Other players ===
Other players that have been summoned in the first team during the current 2025-26 season.

Note: Flags indicate national team as defined under FIFA eligibility rules; some limited exceptions apply. Players may hold more than one non-FIFA nationality.

No.	Pos.	Nation	Player
