= Dolni Disan =

Dolni Disan Долни Дисан
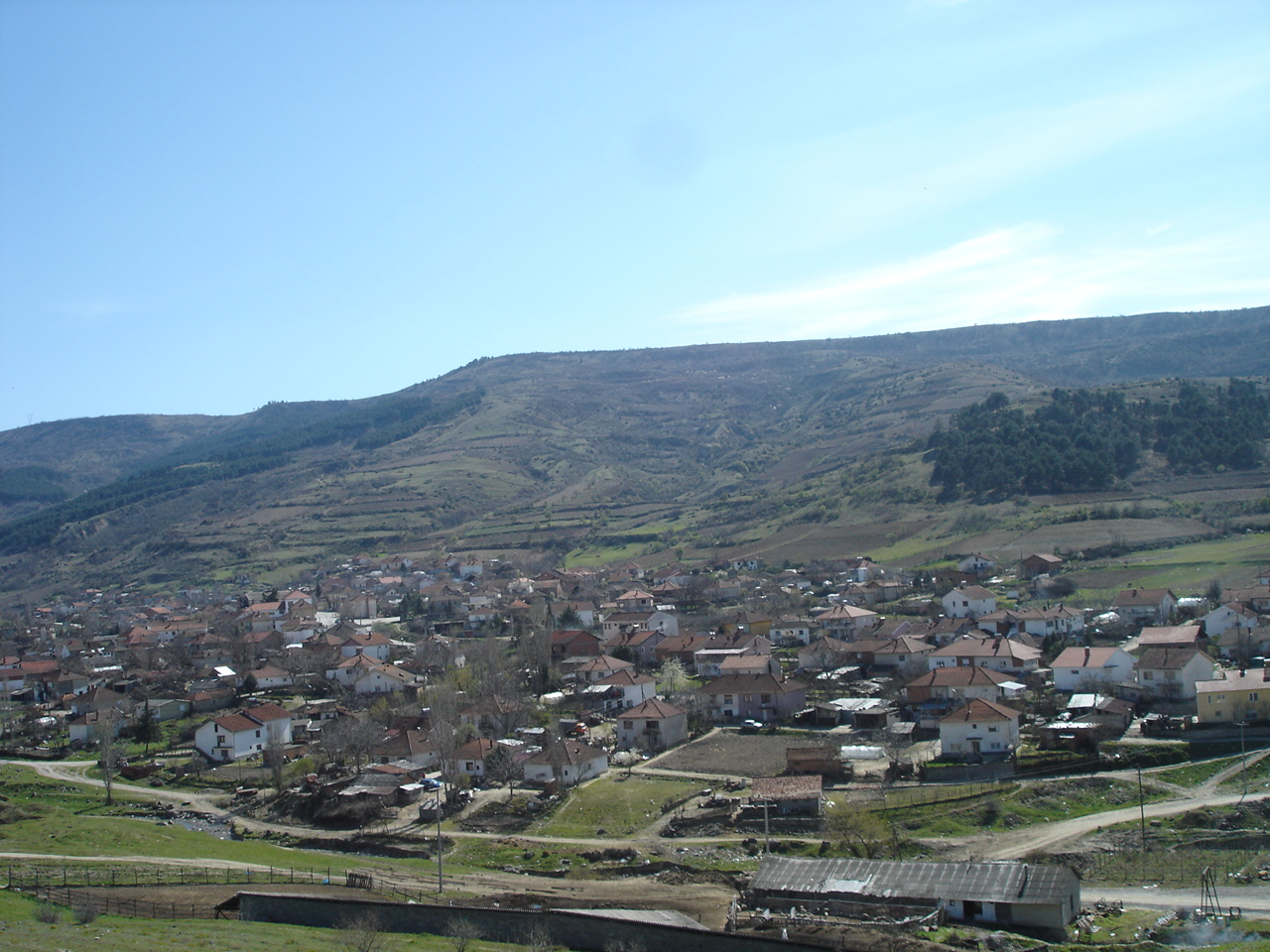
- View of the village

- Location within North Macedonia
- Coordinates: 41.428322°N 22.095614°E
- Country: North Macedonia
- Region: Vardar
- Municipality: Negotino

Population (2002)
  - Total: 931
- Time zone: UTC+1 (CET)
  - Summer (DST): UTC+2 (CEST)
- Car plates: NE
- Climate: Cfa

Dolni Disan (Macedonian: Долни Дисан) is a village in the municipality of Negotino, North Macedonia. It is located in the Povardarie wine-growing region.

== Demographics ==
According to the statistics of Bulgarian ethnographer Vasil Kanchov from 1900, 1556 inhabitants lived in Dolni Disan, 1200 Muslim Bulgarians, 350 Christian Bulgarians and 6 Romani. According to the 2002 census, the village had a total of 931 inhabitants. Ethnic groups in the village include:

- Macedonians 903
- Turks 15
- Serbs 6
- Other 7
