= Timjanik =

Timjanik Тимјаник
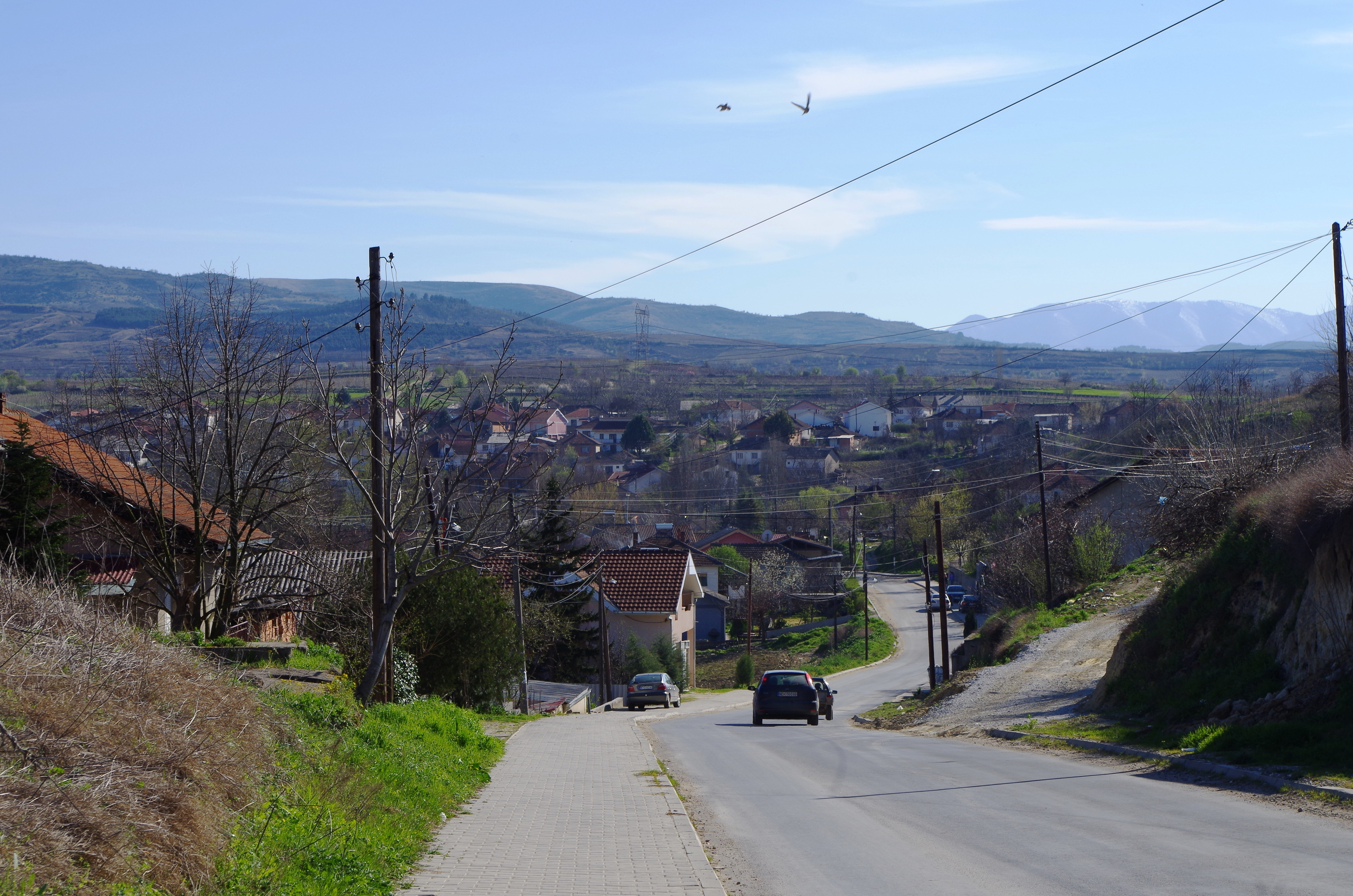
- View of the village

- Location within North Macedonia
- Coordinates: 41.467558°N 22.082326°E
- Country: North Macedonia
- Region: Vardar
- Municipality: Negotino

Population (2021)
  - Total: 1,138
- Time zone: UTC+1 (CET)
  - Summer (DST): UTC+2 (CEST)
- Car plates: NE
- Climate: Cfa

Timjanik (Macedonian: Тимјаник) is a village in the municipality of Negotino, North Macedonia. It is located in the Povardarie wine-growing region.

== Demographics ==
According to the statistics of Bulgarian ethnographer Vasil Kanchov from 1900 the settlement is recorded as "Tamjanik" and having 1250 inhabitants with 1150 being Muslim Bulgarians and 100 being Christian Bulgarians. On the 1927 ethnic map of Leonhard Schulze-Jena, the village is shown as a fully Muslim Bulgarian village. As of the 2021 census, Timjanik had 1,138 residents with the following ethnic composition:

- Macedonians 1,077
- Persons for whom data are taken from administrative sources 27
- Serbs 17
- Turks 13
- Others 4

According to the 2002 census, the village had a total of 1,155 inhabitants. Ethnic groups in the village include:

- Macedonians 1,096
- Turks 9
- Serbs 49
- Others 1
