= Krivolak, Negotino =

Krivolak Криволак
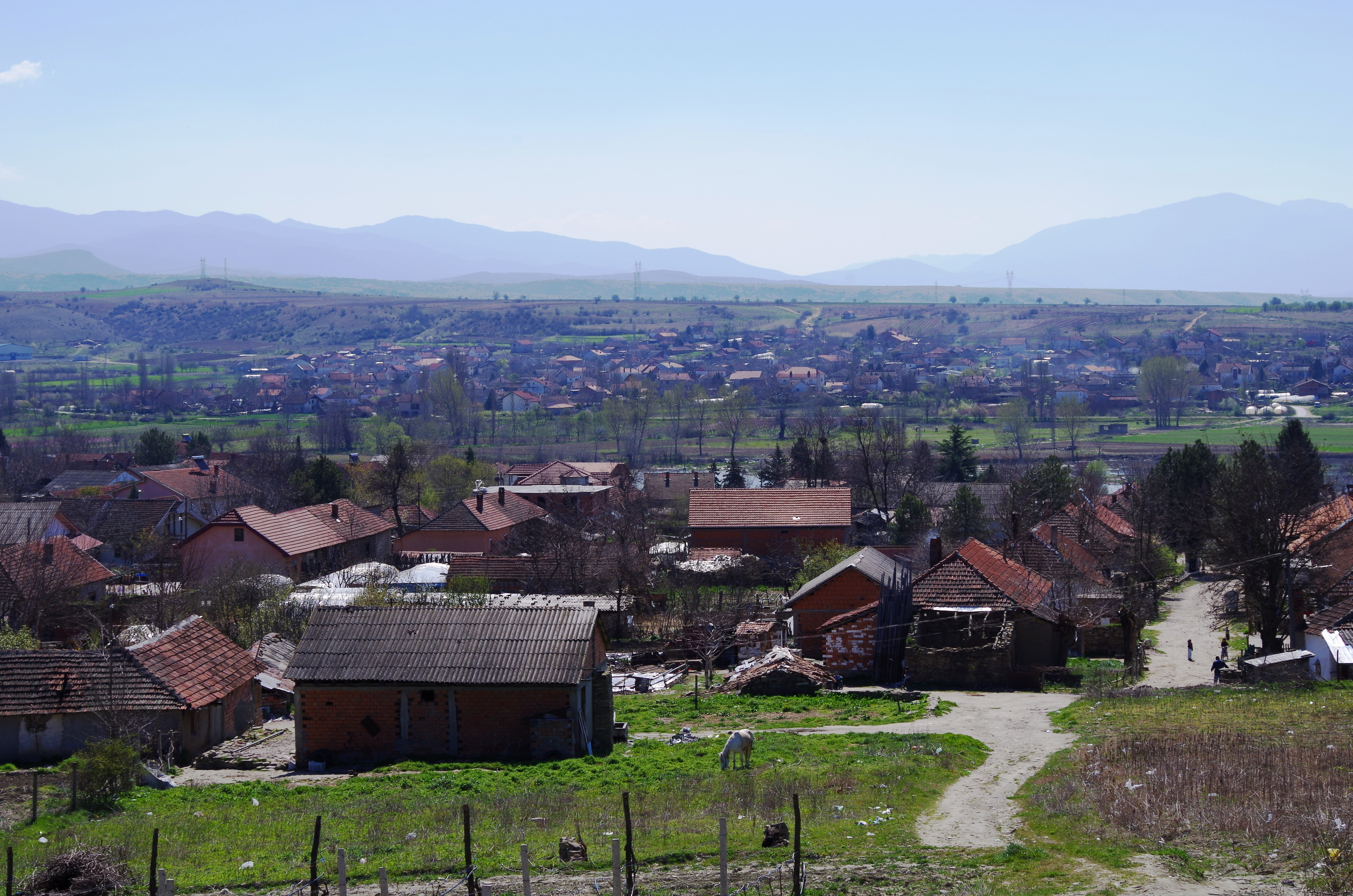
- View of the village

- Location within North Macedonia
- Coordinates: 41.526651°N 22.120223°E
- Country: North Macedonia
- Region: Vardar
- Municipality: Negotino

Population (2021)
  - Total: 1,163
- Time zone: UTC+1 (CET)
  - Summer (DST): UTC+2 (CEST)
- Car plates: NE
- Climate: Cfa

Krivolak (Macedonian: Криволак) is a village in the municipality of Negotino, North Macedonia. It is located in the Povardarie wine-growing region, along the river Vardar. Krivolak is the place where the Battle of Krivolak between the Kingdom of Bulgaria and the French Third Republic took place during World War I.

== Demographics ==
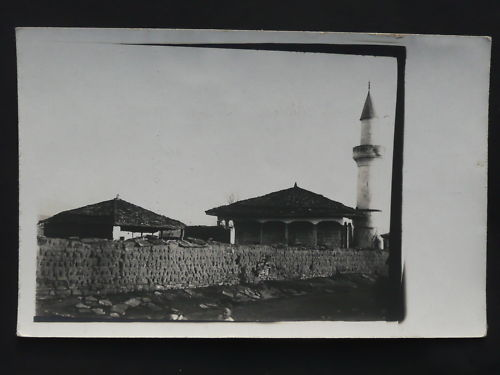
Mosque of Krivolak during the World War I

According to the statistics of Bulgarian ethnographer Vasil Kanchov from 1900, 725 inhabitants lived in Krivolak, 650 Muslim Bulgarians and 75 Christian Bulgarians. On the 1927 ethnic map of Leonhard Schulze-Jena, the village is shown as a fully Muslim Bulgarian village. As of the 2021 census, Krivolak had 1,163 residents with the following ethnic composition:

- Macedonians 504
- Roma 340
- Persons for whom data are taken from administrative sources 113
- Serbs 75
- Others 65
- Turks 52
- Albanians 14

According to the 2002 census, the village had a total of 1,021 inhabitants. Ethnic groups in the village include:

- Macedonians 544
- Turks 28
- Serbs 127
- Romani 319
- Albanians 1
- Others 2
