= Pepelište =

Pepelište Пепелиште
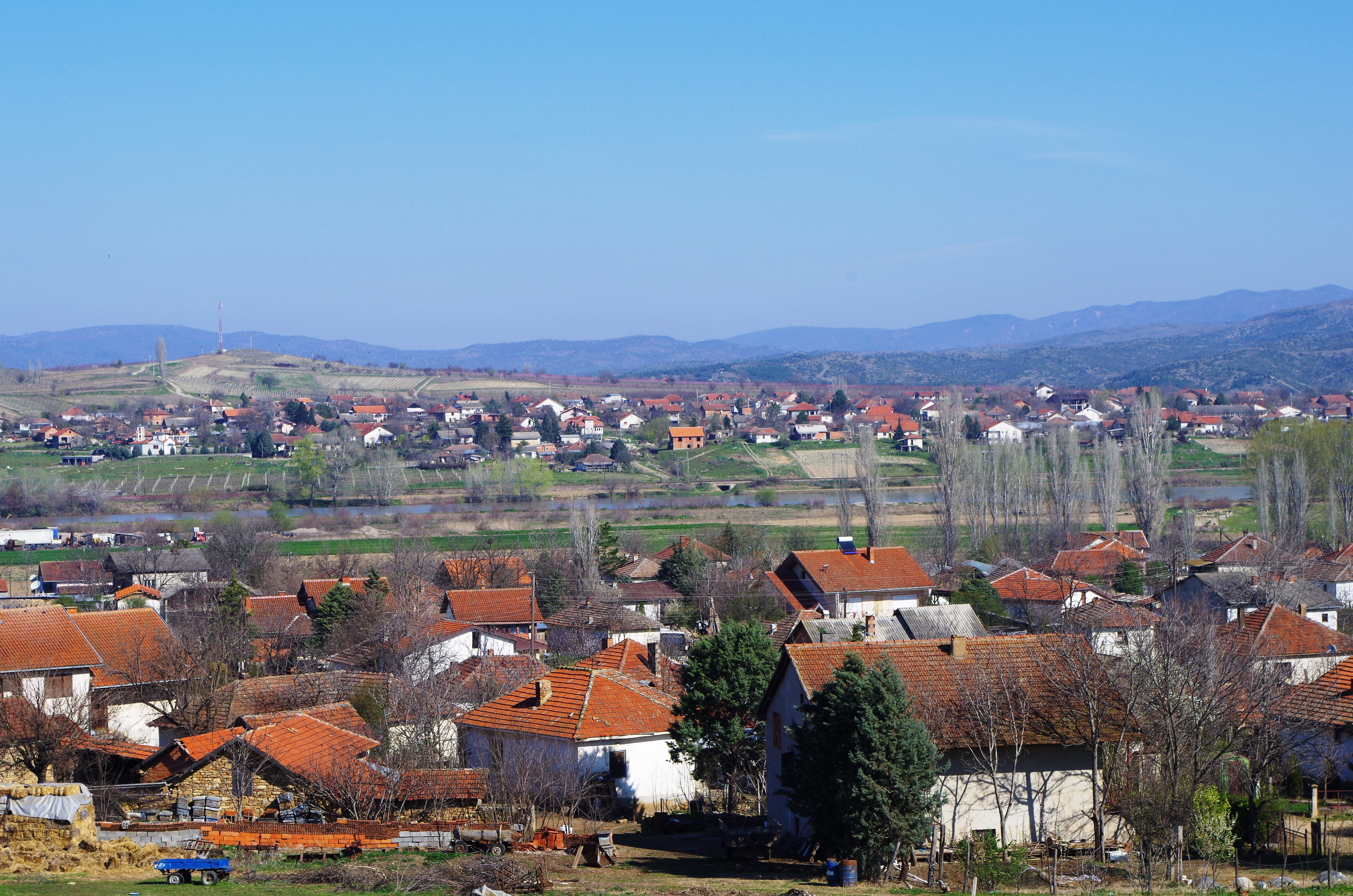
- View of the village

- Location within North Macedonia
- Coordinates: 41.518701°N 22.128555°E
- Country: North Macedonia
- Region: Vardar
- Municipality: Negotino

Population (2002)
  - Total: 1,070
- Time zone: UTC+1 (CET)
  - Summer (DST): UTC+2 (CEST)
- Car plates: NE
- Climate: Cfa

Pepelište (Macedonian: Пепелиште) is a village in the municipality of Negotino, North Macedonia. It is located in the Povardarie wine-growing region, along the river Vardar.

== Demographics ==
According to the statistics of Bulgarian ethnographer Vasil Kanchov from 1900 the settlement is recorded as "Pepelišta" in which 984 inhabitants lived. 850 of them being Muslim Bulgarians, 80 being Christian Bulgarians and 54 being Romani. On the 1927 ethnic map of Leonhard Schulze-Jena, the village is shown as a Muslim Bulgarian village. According to the 2002 census, the village had a total of 1,070 inhabitants. Ethnic groups in the village include:

- Macedonians 796
- Turks 33
- Serbs 194
- Romani 25
- Albanians
- Others 22
