= Tremnik =

Tremnik Тремник
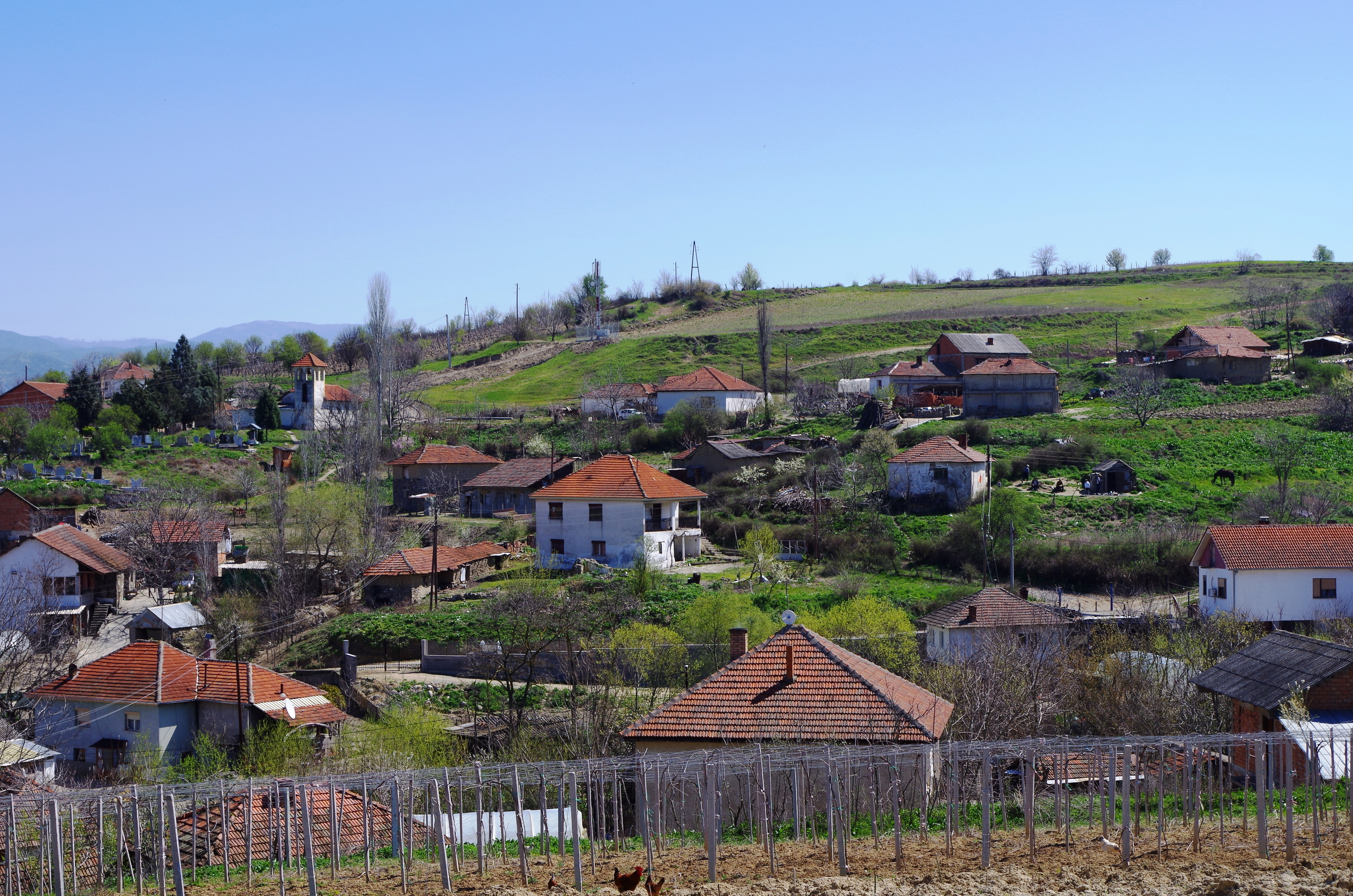
- View of the village

- Location within North Macedonia
- Coordinates: 41.439517°N 22.152865°E
- Country: North Macedonia
- Region: Vardar
- Municipality: Negotino

Population (2002)
  - Total: 827
- Time zone: UTC+1 (CET)
  - Summer (DST): UTC+2 (CEST)
- Car plates: NE
- Climate: Cfa

Tremnik (Macedonian: Тремник) is a village in the municipality of Negotino, North Macedonia. It is located in the Povardarie wine-growing region.

== Demographics ==
According to the statistics of the Bulgarian ethnographer Vasil Kanchov from 1900, 657 inhabitants lived in Tremnik, 554 Muslim Bulgarians, 93 Christian Bulgarians and 10 Romani. On the 1927 ethnic map of Leonhard Schulze-Jena, the village is shown as a fully Muslim Bulgarian village. According to the 2002 census, the village had a total of 827 inhabitants. Ethnic groups in the village include:

- Macedonians 618
- Turks 85
- Serbs 121
- Others 3
