= Diocese of Povardarie =

Macedonian Orthodox diocese

Diocese of Povardarie Епархија Повардарска

Location
- Territory: Veles, Kavadarci, Negotino, Valandovo, Bogdanci, Demir Kapija and Gevgelija
- Headquarters: North Macedonia

Information
- Denomination: Eastern Orthodox
- Sui iuris church: MOC-OA
- Language: Church Slavonic; Macedonian

Current leadership
- Bishop: Agatangel

Website
- website

The Diocese of Povardarie, also known as the Vardar Diocese, is a diocese of the Macedonian Orthodox Church. It covers the municipalities: Veles, Kavadarci, Negotino, Valandovo, Bogdanci, Demir Kapija and Gevgelija. It is headed by Metropolitan Agatangel.

== List of churches and monasteries in the Povardarie ==
- Monastery of St. George – Pološki Monastery, near Kavadarci
- St John the Baptist – Veterski Monastery, near Drenovo
- The Most Holy Theotokos, Veles area
- Monastery of St Demetrios, Veles
- Monastery of St Nicholas – Mokliški Monastery, near Kavadarci
- Cave Church of St Mark, Kavadarci area
- Church of the Most Holy Mother of God, village of Drenovo
