= Kurija =

Kurija Курија
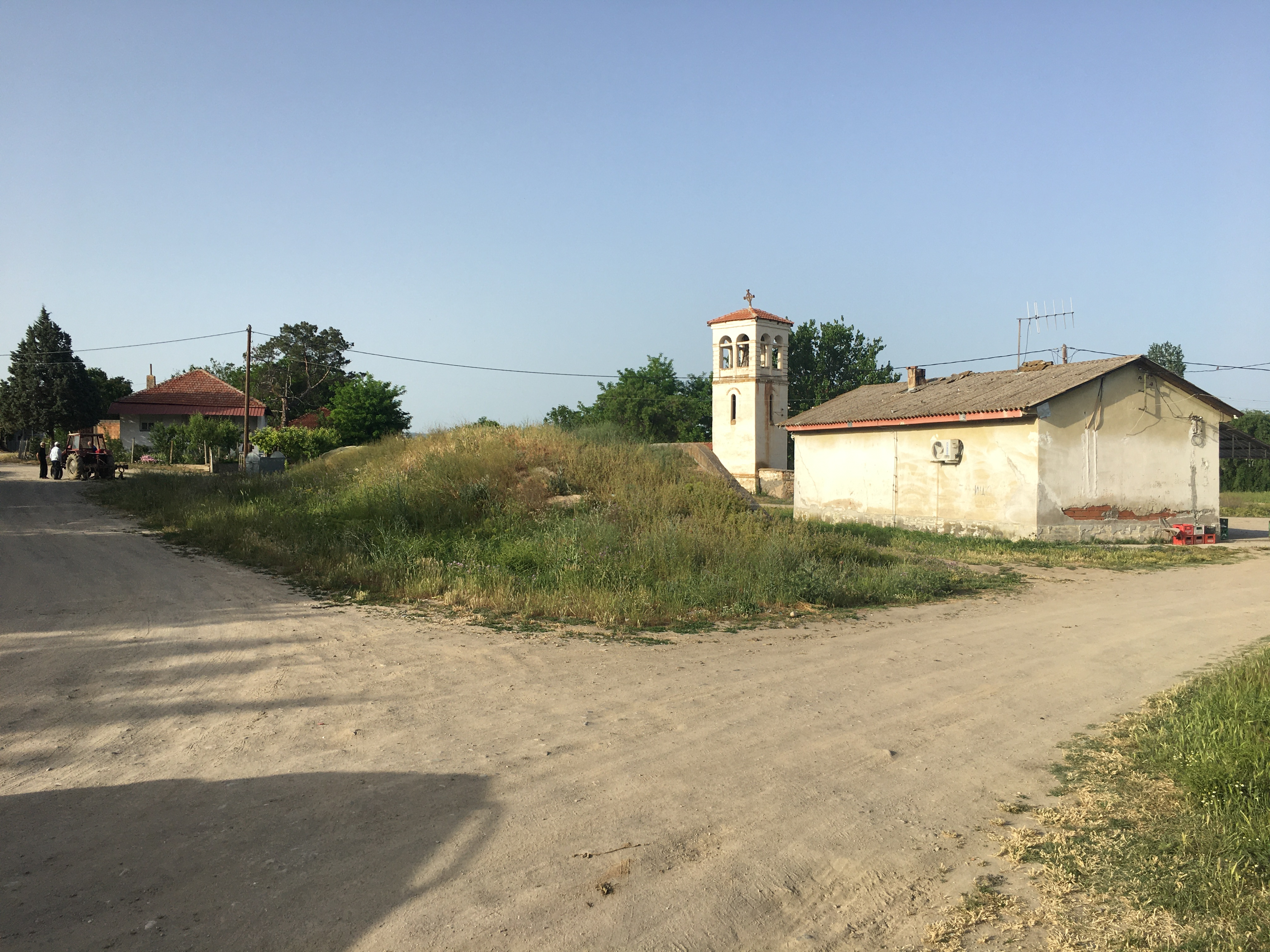
- View of the village

- Location within North Macedonia
- Country: North Macedonia
- Region: Vardar
- Municipality: Negotino

Population (2002)
  - Total: 214
- Time zone: UTC+1 (CET)
  - Summer (DST): UTC+2 (CEST)
- Car plates: NE
- Climate: Cfa

Kurija (Macedonian: Курија) is a village in the municipality of Negotino, North Macedonia. It is located on the banks of the Luda Mara river, nine kilometres from the municipal centre of Negotino.

The bulk of agricultural produce from the village consists of grapes, tomatoes and peppers.[www.skurija.webs.com]

== Demographics ==
On the 1927 ethnic map of Leonhard Schulze-Jena, the village is shown as two settlements of the "Koru Çiftlik". One being a Muslim Bulgarian village with the name "Koru Çiftlik Islam" and the other being a Christian Bulgarian village with the name "Koru Çiftlik Hristiyan". According to the 2002 census, the village had a total of 214 inhabitants. Ethnic groups in the village include:

- Macedonians 210
- Serbs 1
- Aromanians 3
