= Crveni Bregovi =

Crveni Bregovi Црвени Брегови
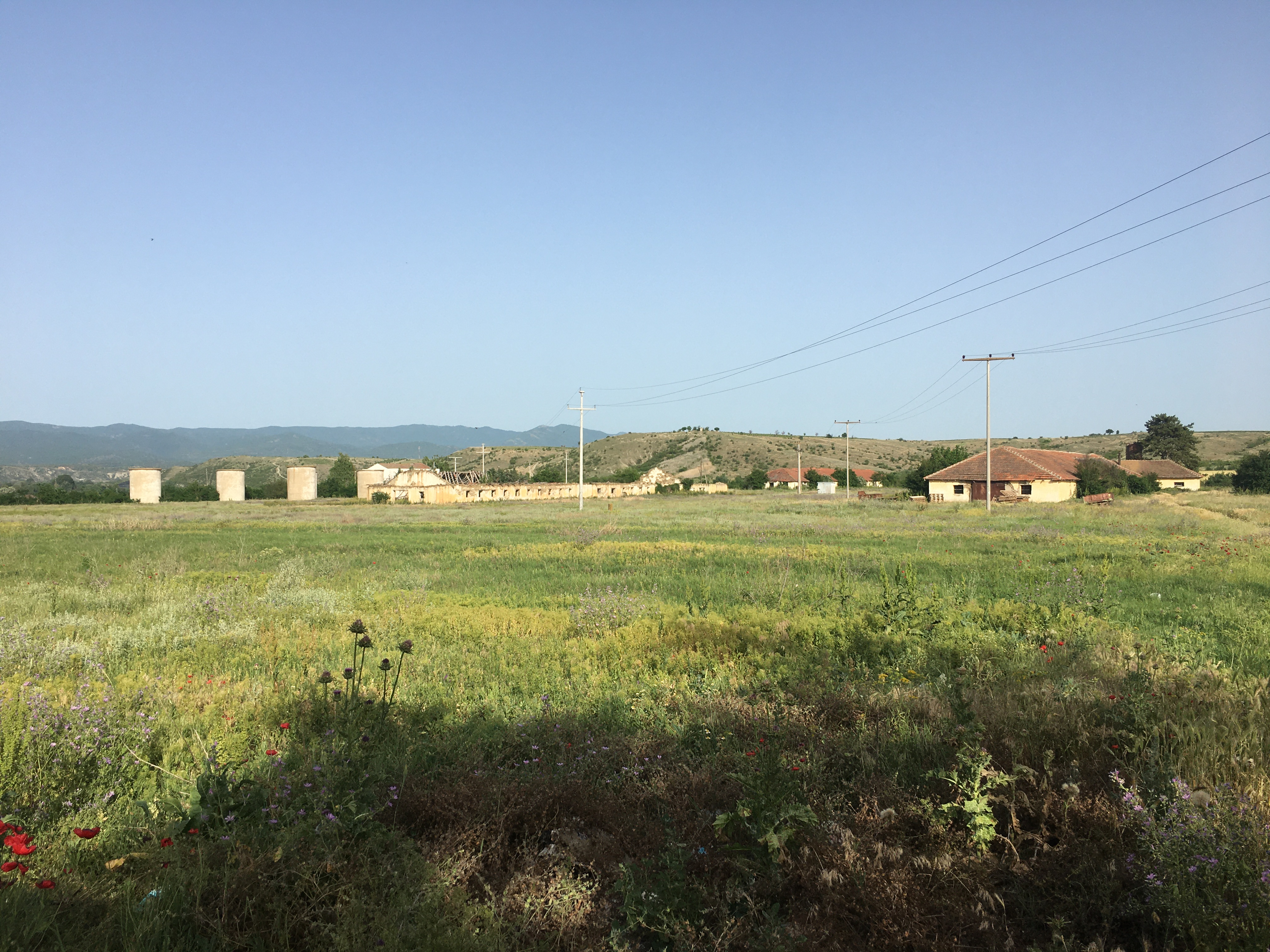
- View of the village

- Location within North Macedonia
- Coordinates: 41.537864°N 22.089636°E
- Country: North Macedonia
- Region: Vardar
- Municipality: Negotino

Population (2021)
  - Total: 182
- Time zone: UTC+1 (CET)
  - Summer (DST): UTC+2 (CEST)
- Car plates: NE
- Climate: Cfa

Crveni Bregovi (Macedonian: Црвени Брегови) is a village in the municipality of Negotino, North Macedonia. It is located in the Povardarie wine-growing region, along the river Vardar.

== Name ==
The village is known as Cërveni Bregovi in Albanian.

== Demographics ==
As of the 2021 census, Crveni Bregovi had 182 residents with the following ethnic composition:

- Others (including Torbeš) 85
- Macedonians 60
- Persons for whom data are taken from administrative sources 22
- Turks 9
- Albanians 5
- Roma 1

According to the 2002 census, the village had a total of 170 inhabitants. Ethnic groups in the village include:

- Macedonians 90
- Romani 34
- Albanians 27
- Turks 17
- Serbs 2
