= Manastirec =

Manastirec Манастирец
- Village
- Location within North Macedonia
- Coordinates: 41.488020°N 21.944642°E
- Country: North Macedonia
- Region: Vardar
- Municipality: Rosoman

Population (2002)
  - Total: 321
- Time zone: UTC+1 (CET)
  - Summer (DST): UTC+2 (CEST)
- Website: .

Manastirec (Macedonian: Манастирец) is a village in the municipality of Rosoman, North Macedonia.

== Demographics ==
According to the statistics of the Bulgarian ethnographer Vasil Kanchov from 1900, 188 inhabitants lived in Manastirec, 116 Christian Bulgarians and 72 Muslim Bulgarians. On the 1927 ethnic map of Leonhard Schulze-Jena, the village is written as "Monastirče" and shown as having a mixed population of Bulgarians and Muslim Bulgarians. According to the 2002 census, the village had a total of 321 inhabitants. Ethnic groups in the village include:

- Macedonians 305
- Serbs 16
