= Rosoman =

Rosoman Росоман
- Village
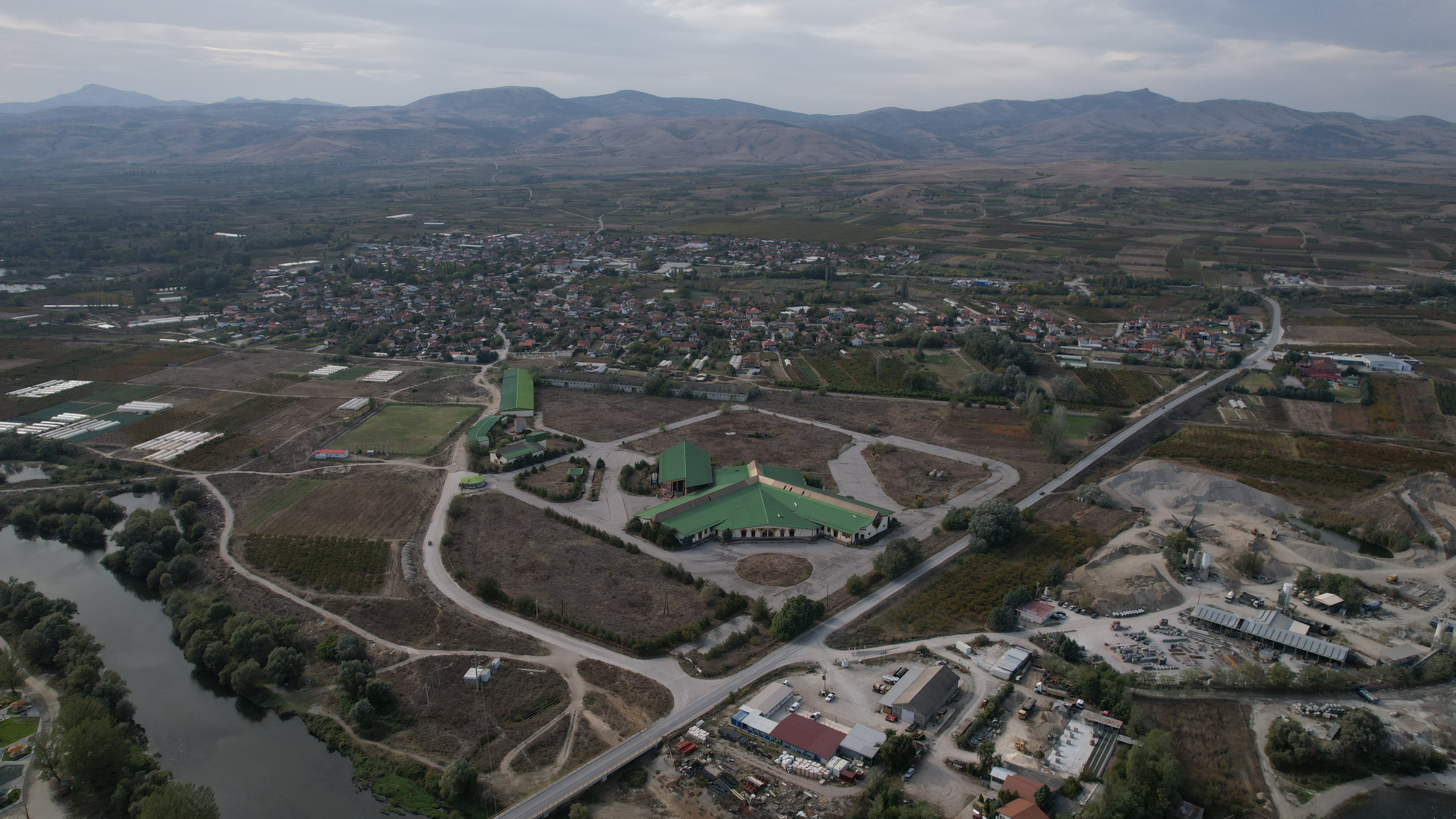
- Air view of the village

- Location within North Macedonia
- Country: North Macedonia
- Region: Vardar
- Municipality: Rosoman

Population (2021)
  - Total: 2,553
- Time zone: UTC+1 (CET)
  - Summer (DST): UTC+2 (CEST)
- Website: .

Rosoman (Macedonian: Росоман) is a village in North Macedonia. It is the seat of the Rosoman municipality.

The village boasts a small roadside market and a few restaurants also situated along the main road. These are strategically positioned so as to attract custom from outside the village, as Rosoman is one of the only villages on the route between Gradsko - to the north (from where motorists join the motorway for Greece or Skopje) - and the Pletvar mountains, which separate central North Macedonia from the important cities of Prilep and Bitola. With no straight road connecting Prilep and Veles, all traffic is diverted via Rosoman.

== History ==
Rosoman has a history over 500 years. The settlement is recorded as village and as "Rosoman" in the Ottoman Tahrir Defter number 370 dating to 1530 and as a village of the Köprülü kaza.

== Demographics ==
According to the statistics of Bulgarian ethnographer Vasil Kanchov from 1900, 1040 inhabitants lived in Rosoman, 100 Christian Bulgarians and 940 Muslim Bulgarians. On the 1927 ethnic map of Leonhard Schulze-Jena, the village is shown as having a mixed population of Bulgarians and Muslim Bulgarians. As of the 2021 census, Rosoman had 2,553 residents with the following ethnic composition:

- Macedonians 2,285
- Serbs 169
- Persons for whom data are taken from administrative sources 56
- Roma 21
- Others 22

According to the 2002 census, the village had a total of 2,554 inhabitants. Ethnic groups in the village include:

- Macedonians 2,285
- Serbs 238
- Romani 2
- Others 29

== Sports ==
Local football club FK Rosoman 83 plays in the Macedonian Second League (East Division).
