= Sirkovo =

Sirkovo Сирково
- Village
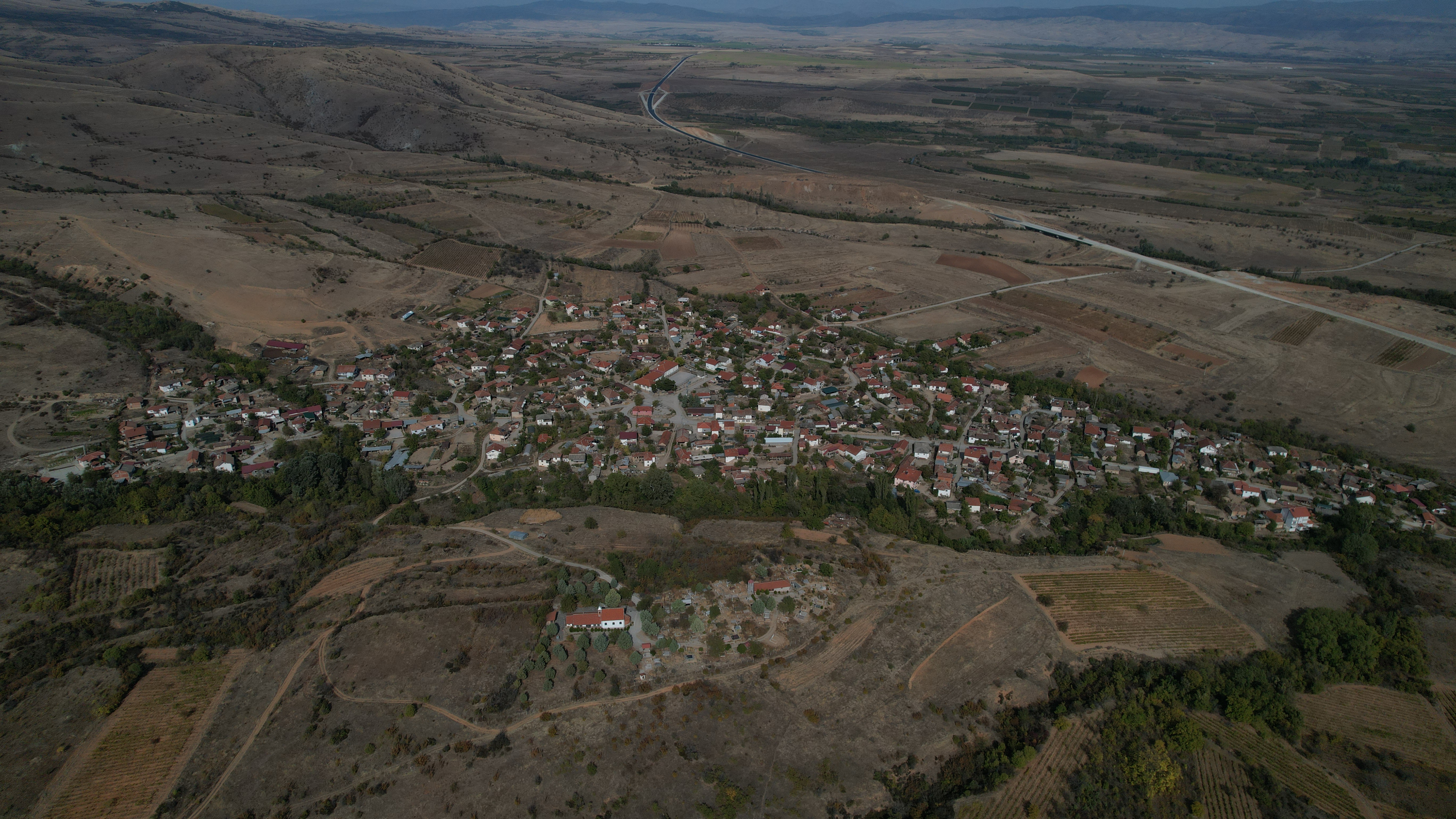
- Air view of the village

- Location within North Macedonia
- Coordinates: 41.505722°N 21.889118°E
- Country: North Macedonia
- Region: Vardar
- Municipality: Rosoman

Population (2002)
  - Total: 603
- Time zone: UTC+1 (CET)
  - Summer (DST): UTC+2 (CEST)
- Website: .

Sirkovo (Macedonian: Сирково) is a village in the municipality of Rosoman, North Macedonia.

== History ==
Sirkovo has a history over 550 years. The settlement is recorded as village and as "Sirkova" in the Ottoman detailed Tahrir Defter number 4 dating to 1478 (Hijri:881) and as a village of the Köprülü kaza.

== Demographics ==
According to the statistics of the Bulgarian ethnographer Vasil Kanchov from 1900, 1471 inhabitants lived in Sirkovo, 1400 Muslim Bulgarians, 60 Christian Bulgarians and 11 Romani. On the 1927 ethnic map of Leonhard Schulze-Jena, the village is shown as a fully Muslim Bulgarian village. According to the 2002 census, the village had a total of 603 inhabitants. Ethnic groups in the village include:

- Macedonians 474
- Serbs 127
- Others 2
