= Vojšanci =

Vojšanci Војшанци
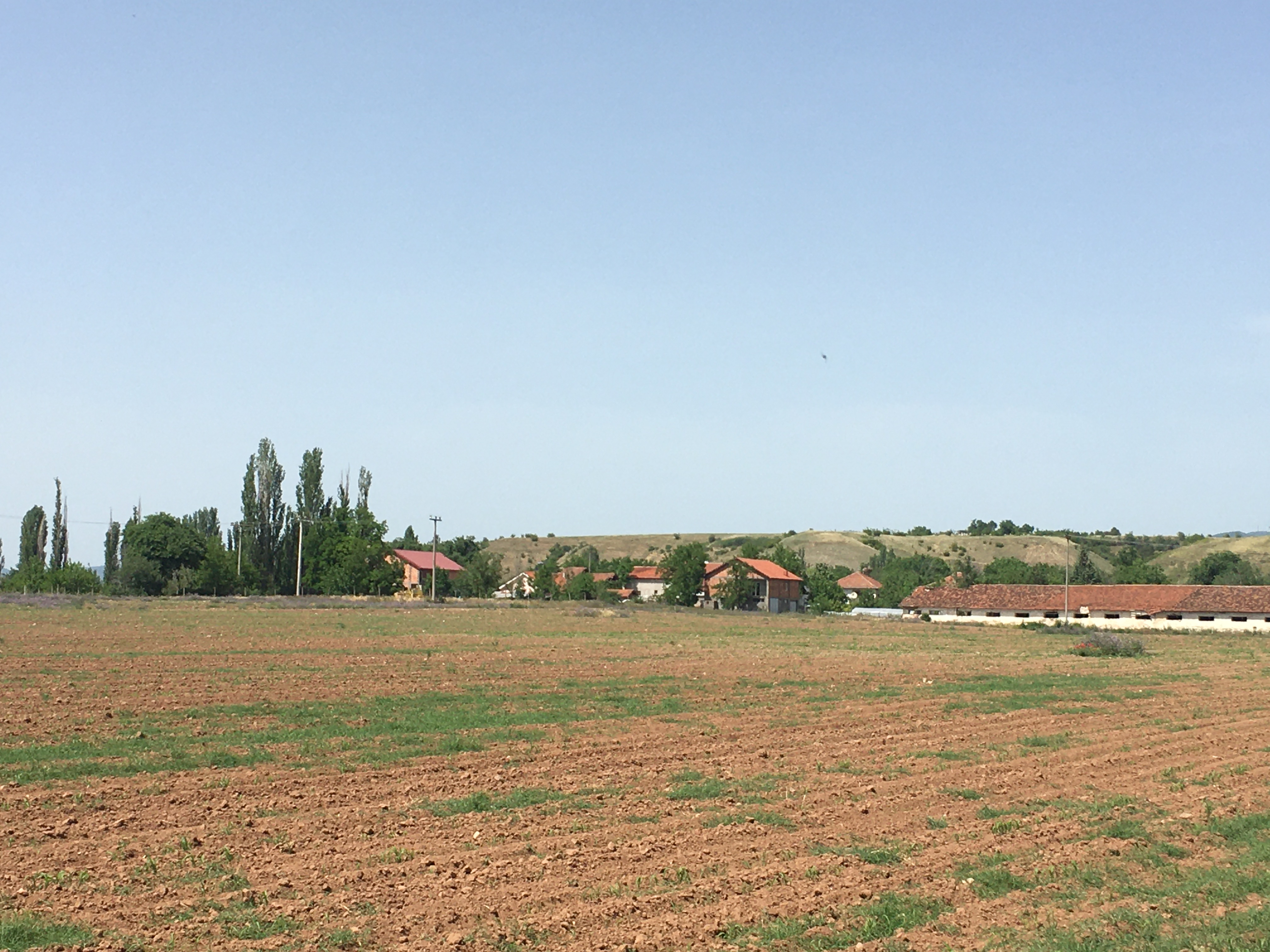
- View of the village

- Location within North Macedonia
- Coordinates: 41.475395°N 22.164757°E
- Country: North Macedonia
- Region: Vardar
- Municipality: Negotino

Population (2002)
  - Total: 432
- Time zone: UTC+1 (CET)
  - Summer (DST): UTC+2 (CEST)
- Car plates: NE
- Climate: Cfa

Vojšanci (Macedonian: Војшанци) is a village in the municipality of Negotino, North Macedonia.

== Demographics ==
According to the 2002 census, the village had a total of 432 inhabitants. Ethnic groups in the village include:

- Macedonians 423
- Serbs 9
