= Palikura =

Palikura Паликура
- Village
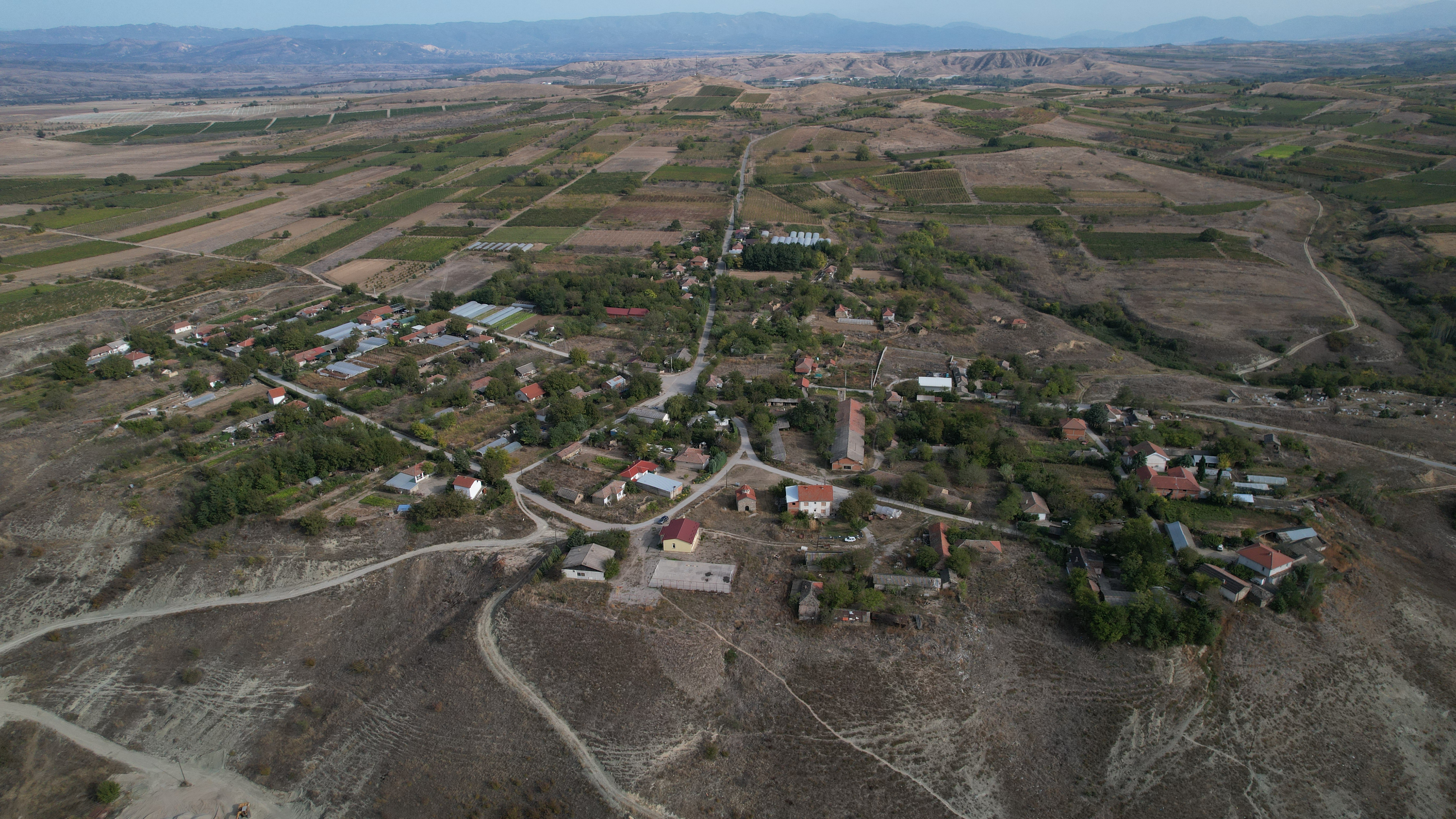
- Air view of the village

- Location within North Macedonia
- Coordinates: 41.536837°N 21.975544°E
- Country: North Macedonia
- Region: Vardar
- Municipality: Rosoman

Population (2002)
  - Total: 183
- Time zone: UTC+1 (CET)
  - Summer (DST): UTC+2 (CEST)
- Website: .

Palikura (Macedonian: Паликура) is a village in the municipality of Rosoman, North Macedonia.

== Demographics ==
According to the statistics of the Bulgarian ethnographer Vasil Kanchov from 1900, 130 inhabitants lived in Palikura, all Christian Bulgarians. On the 1927 ethnic map of Leonhard Schulze-Jena, the village is written as "Çiftlik Palikura" and shown as a Christian Bulgarian village. According to the 2002 census, the village had a total of 183 inhabitants. Ethnic groups in the village include:

- Macedonians 161
- Serbs 17
- Romani 4
- Others 1
