= Trstenik, Rosoman =

Trstenik Трстеник
- Village
- Location within North Macedonia
- Coordinates: 41.474654°N 21.918748°E
- Country: North Macedonia
- Region: Vardar
- Municipality: Rosoman

Population (2002)
  - Total: 246
- Time zone: UTC+1 (CET)
  - Summer (DST): UTC+2 (CEST)
- Website: .

Trstenik (Macedonian: Трстеник) is a village in the municipality of Rosoman, North Macedonia.

== Demographics ==
According to the statistics of the Bulgarian ethnographer Vasil Kanchov from 1900, 140 inhabitants lived in Trstenik, all Christian Bulgarians. On the 1927 ethnic map of Leonhard Schulze-Jena, the village is written as "Trstani" and shown as a Christian Bulgarian village. According to the 2002 census, the village had a total of 246 inhabitants. Ethnic groups in the village include:

- Macedonians 239
- Serbs 7
