= Rosoman Municipality =

Municipality of North Macedonia

Coordinates: 41.52°N 21.95°E

Rosoman Municipality Општина Росоман
- Rural municipality
- Flag Coat of arms

- Country: North Macedonia
- Region: Vardar
- Municipal seat: Rosoman

Government
  - Mayor: Gjorgji Krstevski (VMRO- DPMNE)

Area
  - Total: 132.9 km^{2} (51.3 sq mi)

Population
  - Total: 3,796
  - Density: 31.16/km^{2} (80.7/sq mi)
- Time zone: UTC+1 (CET)
- Postal code: 1422
- Area code: 043
- Vehicle registration: KA
- Website: http://www.OpstinaRosoman.gov.mk

Rosoman (Macedonian: Росоман) is a municipality in central North Macedonia. Rosoman is also the name of the village where the municipal seat is found. Rosoman Municipality is part of the Vardar Statistical Region.

== Geography ==
The municipality borders Gradsko Municipality to the north, Negotino Municipality to the east, Čaška Municipality to the west, and Kavadarci Municipality to the south.

== Demographics ==
The municipality has a population of 4,141 according to the 2002 Macedonia census, with density of 31,16 people/km^{2}. In the census in 1994, 4,328 people were registered as residents of this municipality. According to the 2021 North Macedonia census, this municipality has 3,796 inhabitants. Ethnic groups in the municipality:

	2002		2021	
	Number	%	Number	%
TOTAL	4,141	100	3,796	100
Macedonians	3,694	89.21	3,365	88.65
Serbs	409	9.88	253	6.66
Roma	6	0.14	35	0.92
Albanians			5	0.13
Vlachs			4	0.11
Other / Undeclared / Unknown	32	0.77	25	0.66
Persons for whom data are taken from administrative sources			109	2.87

== Inhabited places ==
The municipality is completely rural, meaning that all the inhabited places within are villages. There are 10 inhabited places.

Inhabited places in Rosoman Municipality
Villages: Debrište | Kamen Dol | Kruešvica | Manastirec | Mrzen Oraovec | Palikura | Ribarci | Rosoman | Sirkovo | Trstenik |
