= Agriculture in North Macedonia =

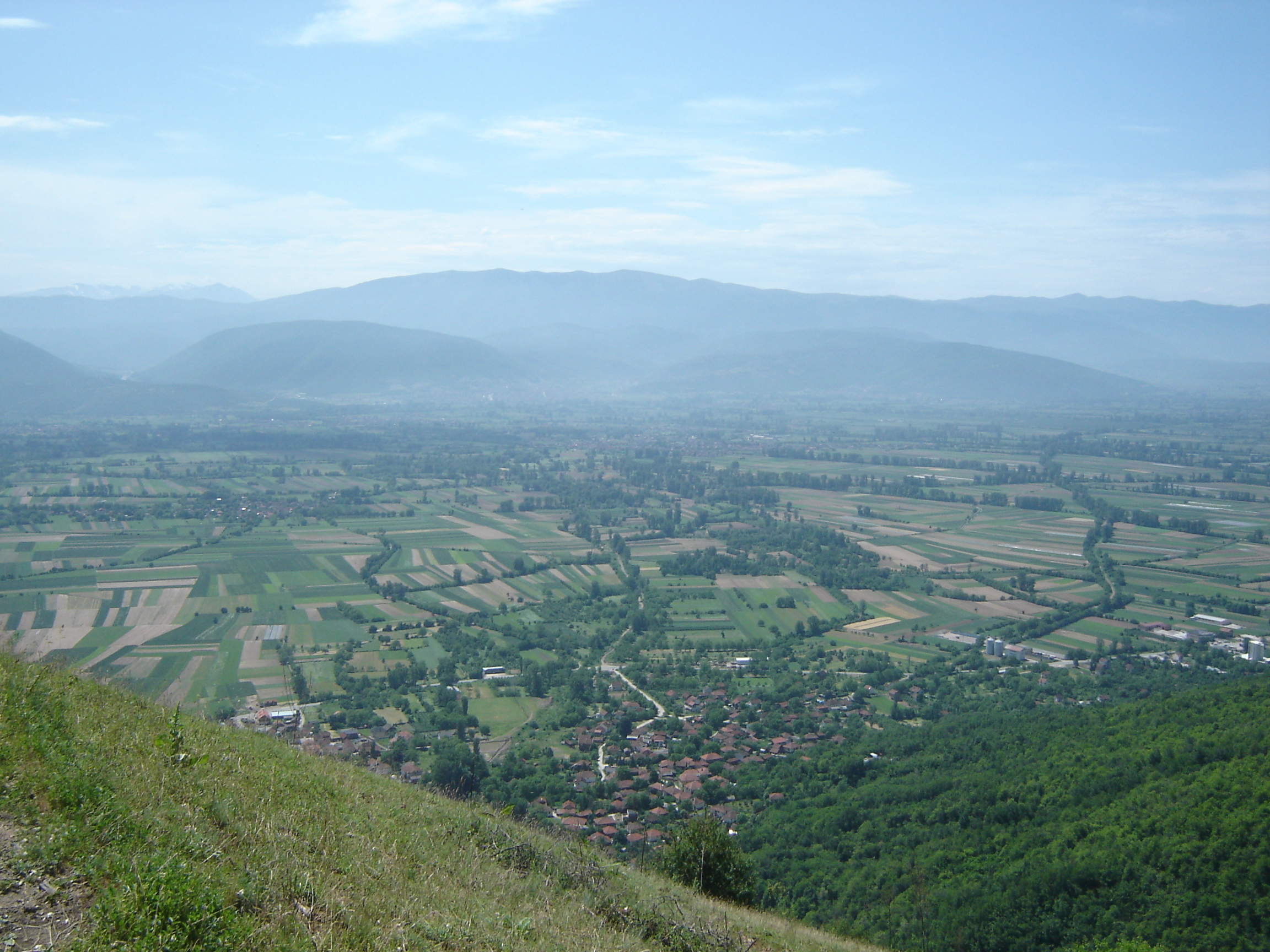
The Macedonian countryside in the Polog Valley

Agriculture in North Macedonia provides a livelihood for a fifth of the country's population, where half live in a rural area. Industrialisation of the country was very delayed, due to the long Ottoman domination, and then destruction from World War I and Serbian occupation. Massive agrarian reforms began under Socialist Federative Yugoslavia with its own communist rule. The continental and sub-Mediterranean climates in the country allows for a great diversity of output, but the pronounced terrain creates areas that are unexploitable for farmers. Macedonian agriculture is dominated by livestock farming, especially in its mountainous regions, viticulture, and the growing of fruit and vegetables, cereals, and tobacco. Agriculture in the country is characterised by numerous small-scale family farms, but also by large businesses, left over from the socialist era. Since its independence in 1991, the country has become a market economy. Today, agriculture accounts for 10% of North Macedonia's GDP.

== History ==
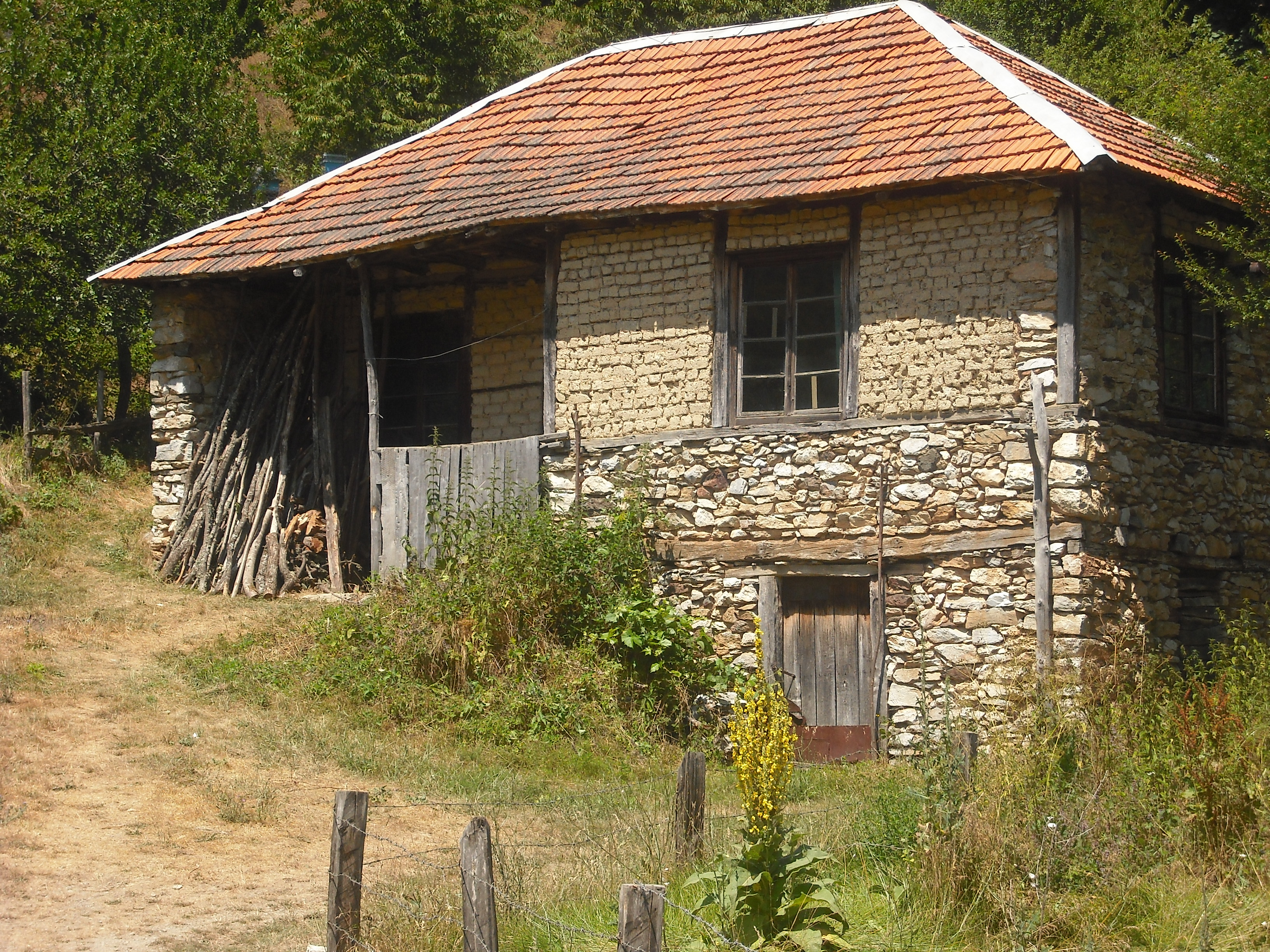
Traditional Macedonian farm

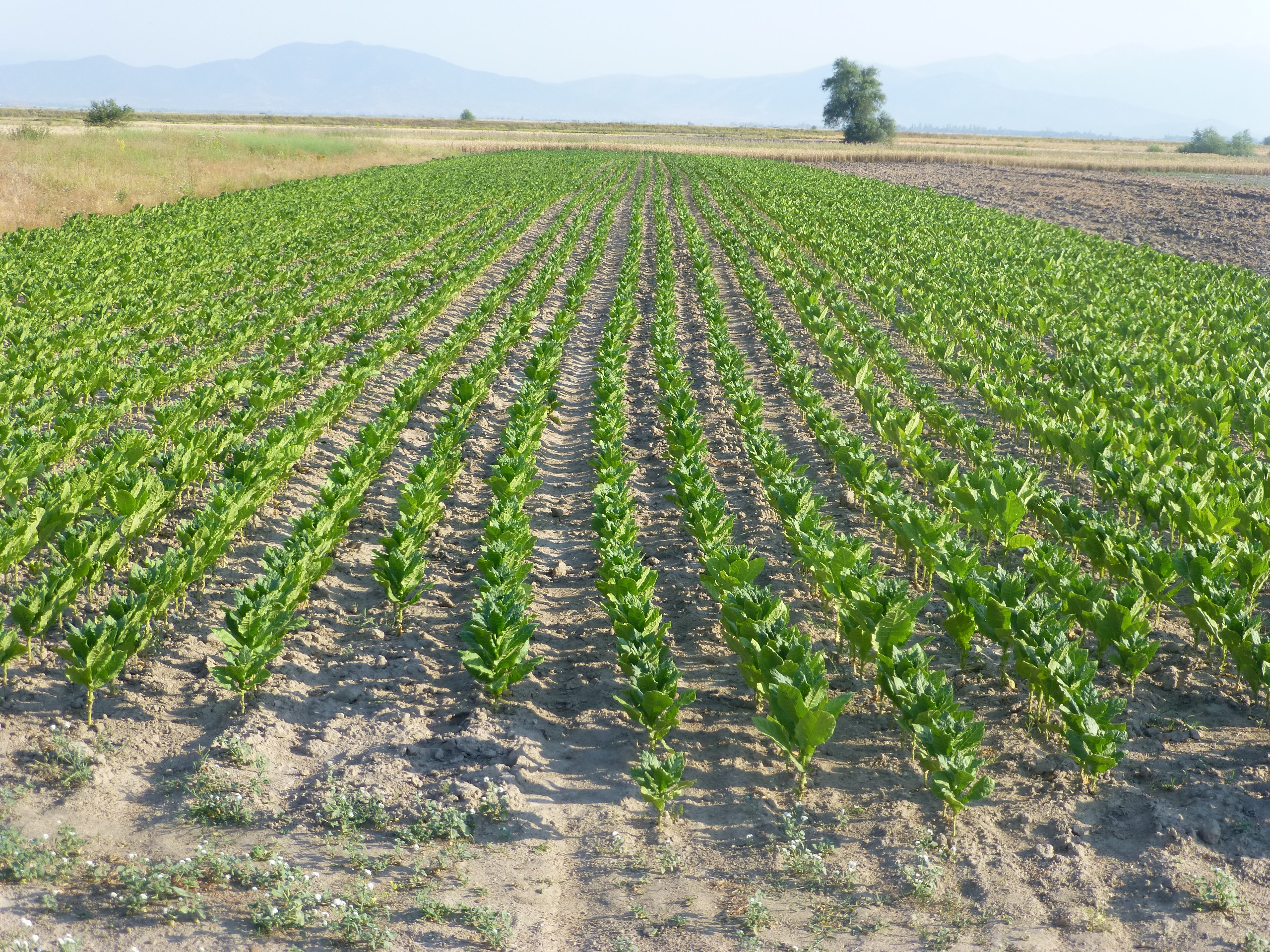
Tobacco growing in a field near Krivogaštani

The first inhabitants of what is now North Macedonia arrived during the Neolithic period, and practised agriculture. The history of farming in the country, however, was very little documented up until the Ottoman invasion in the 14th century.

The Ottomans quickly reformed local administration and established the Timar system, which allowed former officers of the Sultan, Turks, and Albanians, to own land, on which local peasants worked. These peasants however, fled the valleys due to frequent movements of the army, and settled on the hills. In order to replace them, the authorities encouraged the migration of Anatolians and Vlachs, mainly livestock farmers and cattle traders. The properties of the Timar system were less than 20 hectares in size, and produced small quantities of cereals and cotton.

From 1600, the weakening of the imperial Turkish authorities led to the deterioration of the living conditions of Christians. In order to face up to financial difficulties, the Sultan privatised some Macedonian land and offered certain properties (Chiflik) to former soldiers, who gained all the rights to their estate and the peasants who lived there. Many Christian peasants fled the agricultural lands of the valleys once again to join the Hajduks, groups of outlaws who spread trouble on trade routes.

Up to the 19th century, while the region opened itself up to the East, the local economy collapsed, notably because of American and Indian competition on the cotton and cereal markets. The absence of taxes on non-cultivated land meant that four-fifths of arable land was left as pasture.

When Macedonia was annexed by Serbia in 1912, it was a very poor region, where 80% of the population lived off agriculture, and 70% of peasants didn't own land but worked on estates owned by Ottoman landlords. After the departure of the Turks, the Serbs enacted a law to encourage Serbian colonisation; the Macedonians wouldn't have the right to own property outside of their district, and several estates on arable land were offered to Serbian officers.

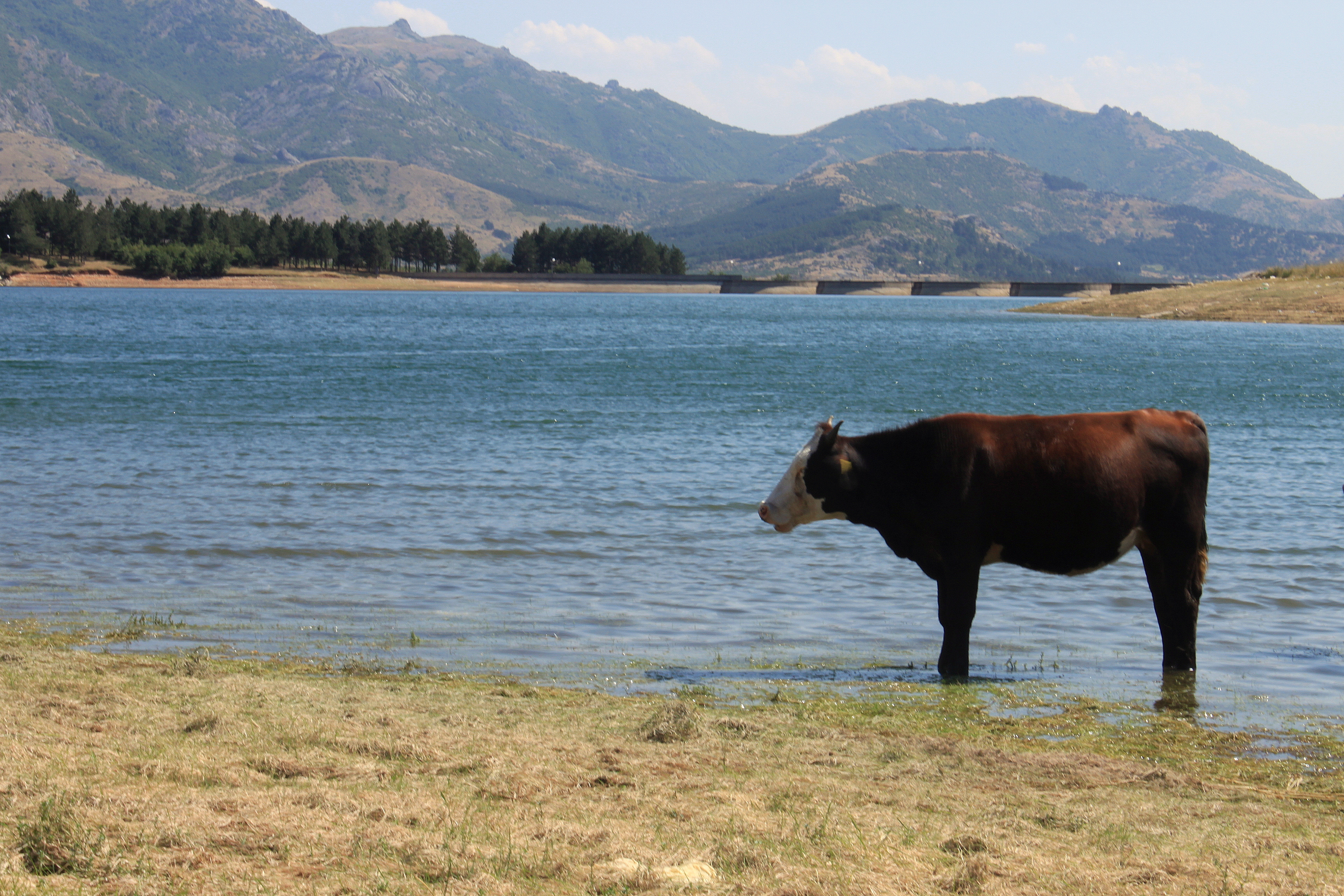
A cow on the edge of Lake Prilep

After the First World War, industrial farming was promoted, especially in the growing of cotton, tobacco, and opium poppies. But the majority of Macedonian peasants, who represented 75% of the population, worked on small parcels of land using archaic methods. The local economy suffered due to the lack of infrastructure and the Great Depression in 1929, which made, for example, the price of the opium poppy fall by 77%.

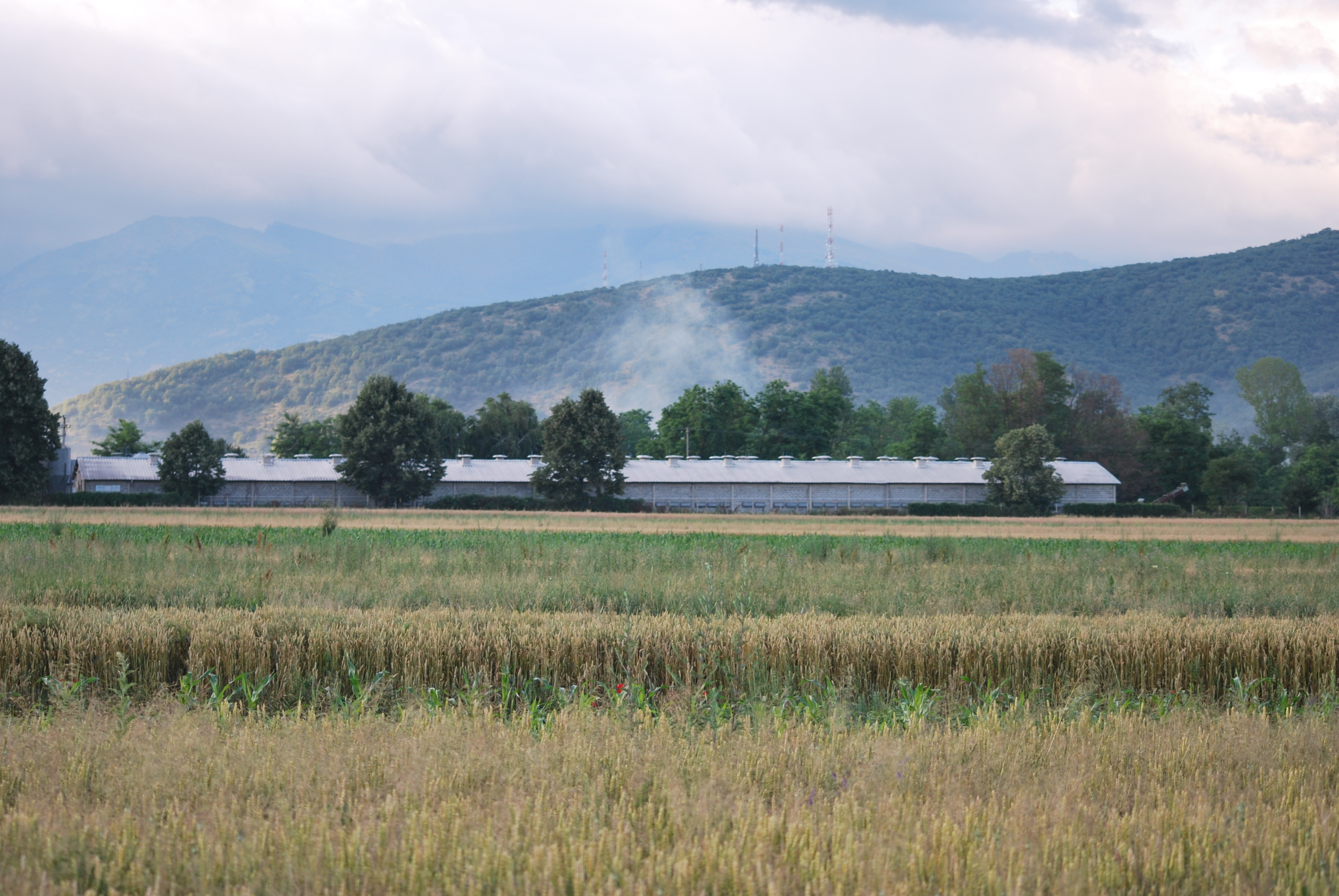
Industrial farm in Polog

After the Second World War, the Communist regime began a vast re-planning of agriculture, a sector still largely dominant in the Macedonian economy. The properties of exiles, foreigners, monasteries, formerly private companies, and banks, were nationalised, and half of the total was allocated to farmers who had supported the fight against fascism. The rest was left to planned industrial agriculture, and was divided between several cooperatives. All private estates were reorganised so that one family had between 20 and 35 hectares of land.

The Socialist Republic of Macedonia mainly produced tobacco and opium poppy, destined for the pharmaceutical industry.

The development of industry lowered the very high number of farmers, who however, remained very important: accounting for almost 80% of the population in 1945, 57% in 1961, and 22% in 1981.

After its independence in 1991, the country became a market economy. The naming dispute with Greece, as well as the Yugoslav Wars lost Macedonia its main port of exportation, Thessaloniki, and prevented trade with neighbouring Serbia. The country lost 60% of its trade activity and was close to bankruptcy. The naming dispute drew to a close in 1995, but in 1999, the Kosovo War heavily influenced the Macedonian economy, because it could no longer export goods to the countries of the former Yugoslavia, and had to find alternative customers, such as Bulgaria, Romania, and Greece.

== Farming structure ==
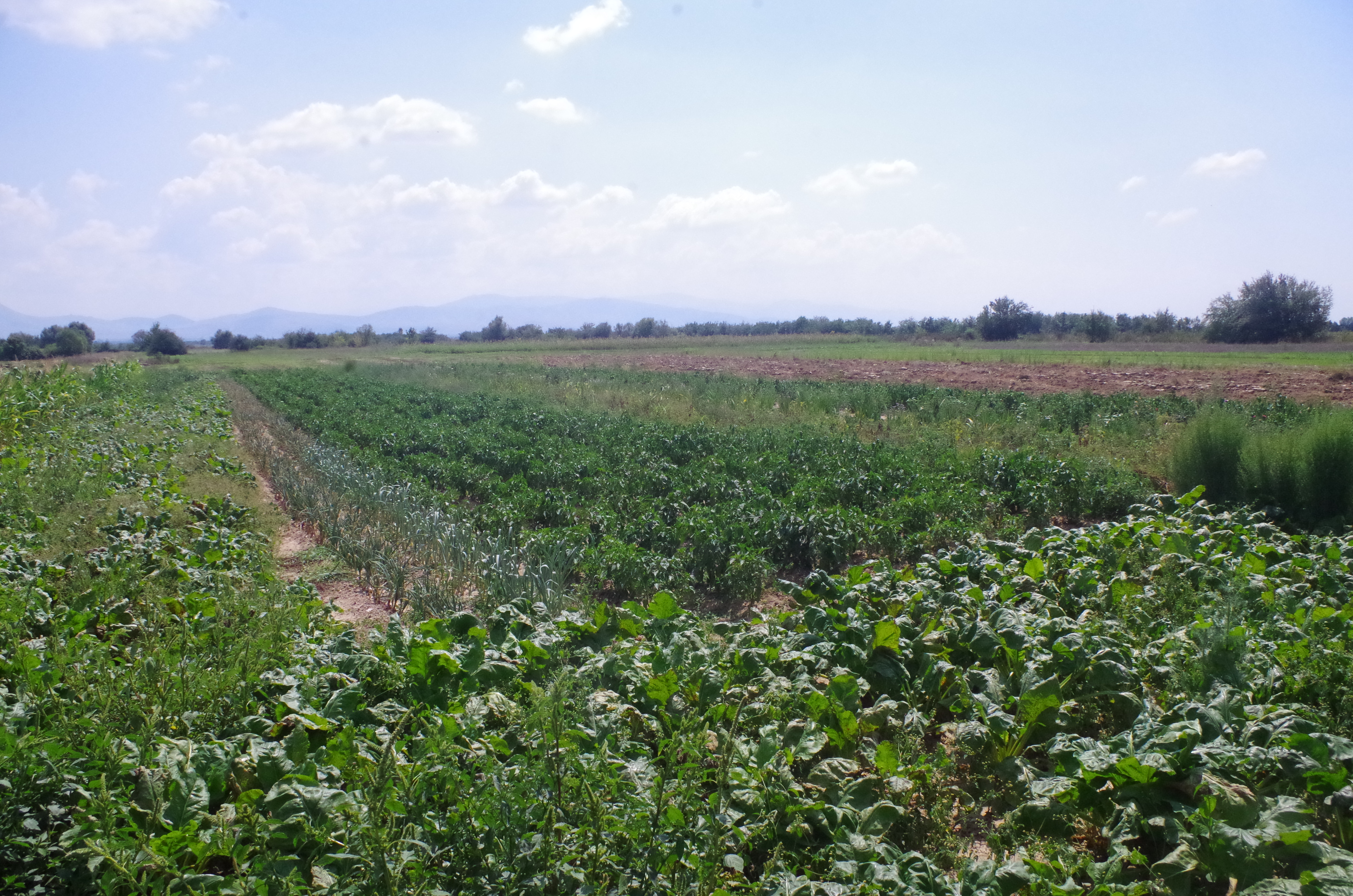
Fields in Pelagonia

North Macedonia possesses 10,140 km^{2} of agricultural land, which is almost 39% of its territory. Half of this land is devoted to crop growing, and the other half livestock farming. The country has 48,606.75 hectares of forests. Macedonia distinguishes itself by the smallness of its agricultural properties: 80% of them are between 2.5 and 2.8 hectares, and are divided into small parcels. The former state-owned businesses, which are much bigger, are generally in financial difficulties due to incomplete privatisations.

Crop growing is located mainly in the low-lying plains of the country, like Pelagonia in the south-west, Polog in the north-west, and the Vardar Valley, a river which crosses the country from north to south. The Strumica region, in the south-east of the country, is the main production region, with 8,130 hectares of arable land.

Macedonian farmers face difficulties, such as the lack of seeds and quality fertiliser, the poor state of irrigation systems, and the lack of good sales strategies.

== Production ==
=== Livestock farming ===
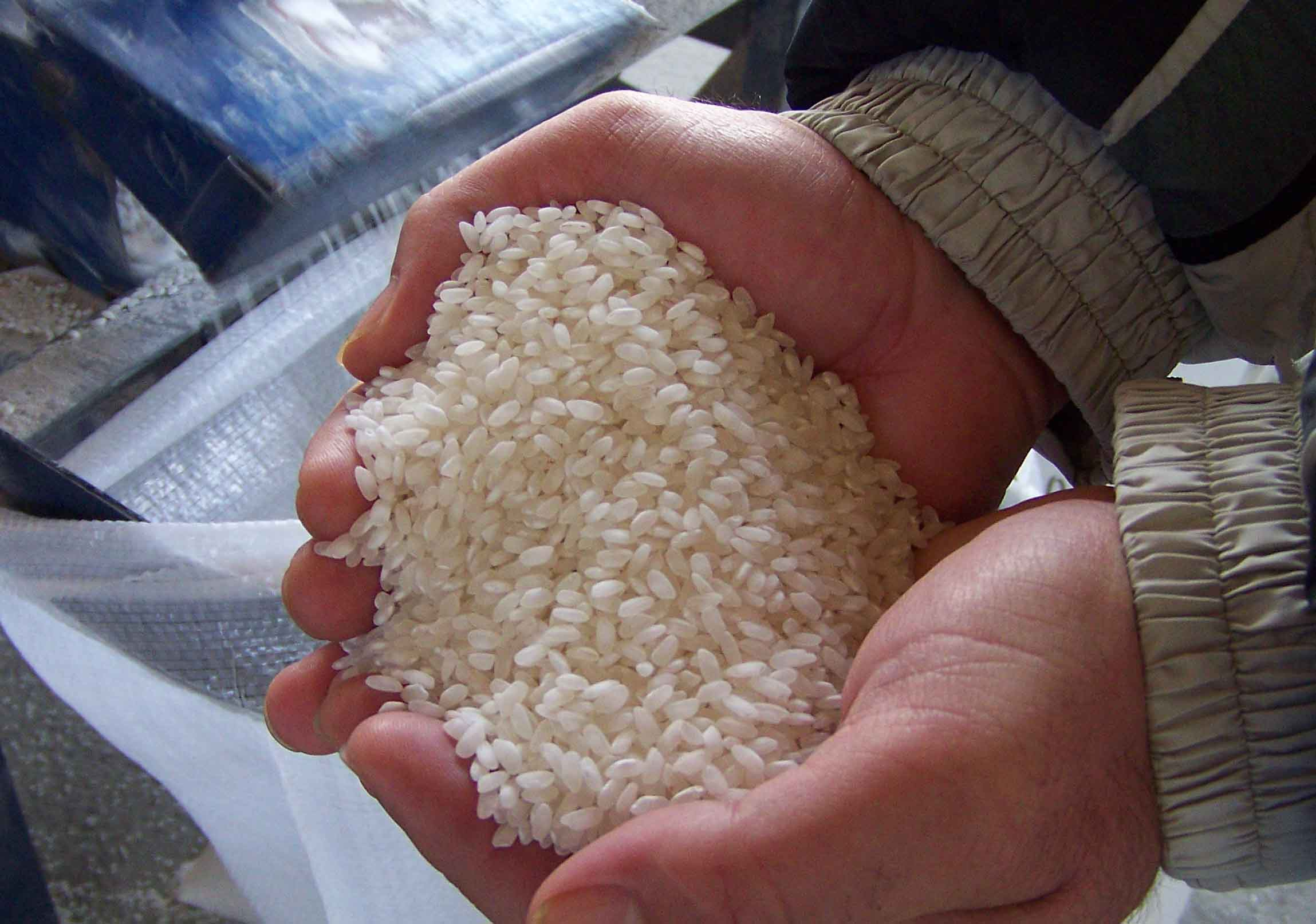
Handful of rice in Kočani

In North Macedonia, the farming of sheep is predominant, with 794,053 sheep in 2007. Next are cows (241,257 animals); then goats (132,924 animals); and finally horses (32,567 animals). Sheep rearing allows for the production of wool, meat, and milk, which is mainly used for the production of cheese. Macedonian farmers also rear chickens (2,428,828 animals) and rabbits. The country also has 109,769 beehives.

=== Crops ===
The country mainly produces cereals, especially wheat, maize, oats, and rice, and also vegetables, such as tomatoes, bell peppers, cucumbers, beans, potatoes, onions, cabbages, and melons. Tobacco, opium poppies, and fruits such as apples, pears, prunes, cherries, apricots, peaches, nuts, and grapes — especially for the production of wine — are also grown.

North Macedonia produced in 2020:

- 318,000 tons of grape;
- 246,000 tons of wheat;
- 205,000 tons of bell pepper;
- 193,000 tons of potato;
- 168,000 tons of cabbage;
- 155,000 tons of tomato;
- 150,000 tons of maize;
- 148,000 tons of barley;
- 125,000 tons of watermelon;
- 106,000 tons of apple;
- 63,000 tons of onion;
- 49,000 tons of cucumber;

In addition to smaller productions of other agricultural products.

== Bibliography ==
- Georgieva, Valentina; Konechni, Sasha (1998). Historical Dictionary of the Republic of Macedonia. Lanham, MD: Scarecrow Press. ISBN 978-0-8108-3336-4. OCLC 36949809.
- Lampe, John (2000). Yugoslavia as history : twice there was a country. Cambridge New York: Cambridge University Press. ISBN 978-0-521-77401-7. OCLC 42874897.
- Rossos, Andrew (2008). Macedonia and the Macedonians : A History. Stanford, CA: Hoover Institution Press. ISBN 978-0-8179-4882-5. OCLC 535519681.
- Poulton, Hugh (2000). Who are the Macedonians?. London: C. Hurst & Co. ISBN 1-85065-534-0. OCLC 43822146.
