= Negotino =

Negotino Неготино (Macedonian)
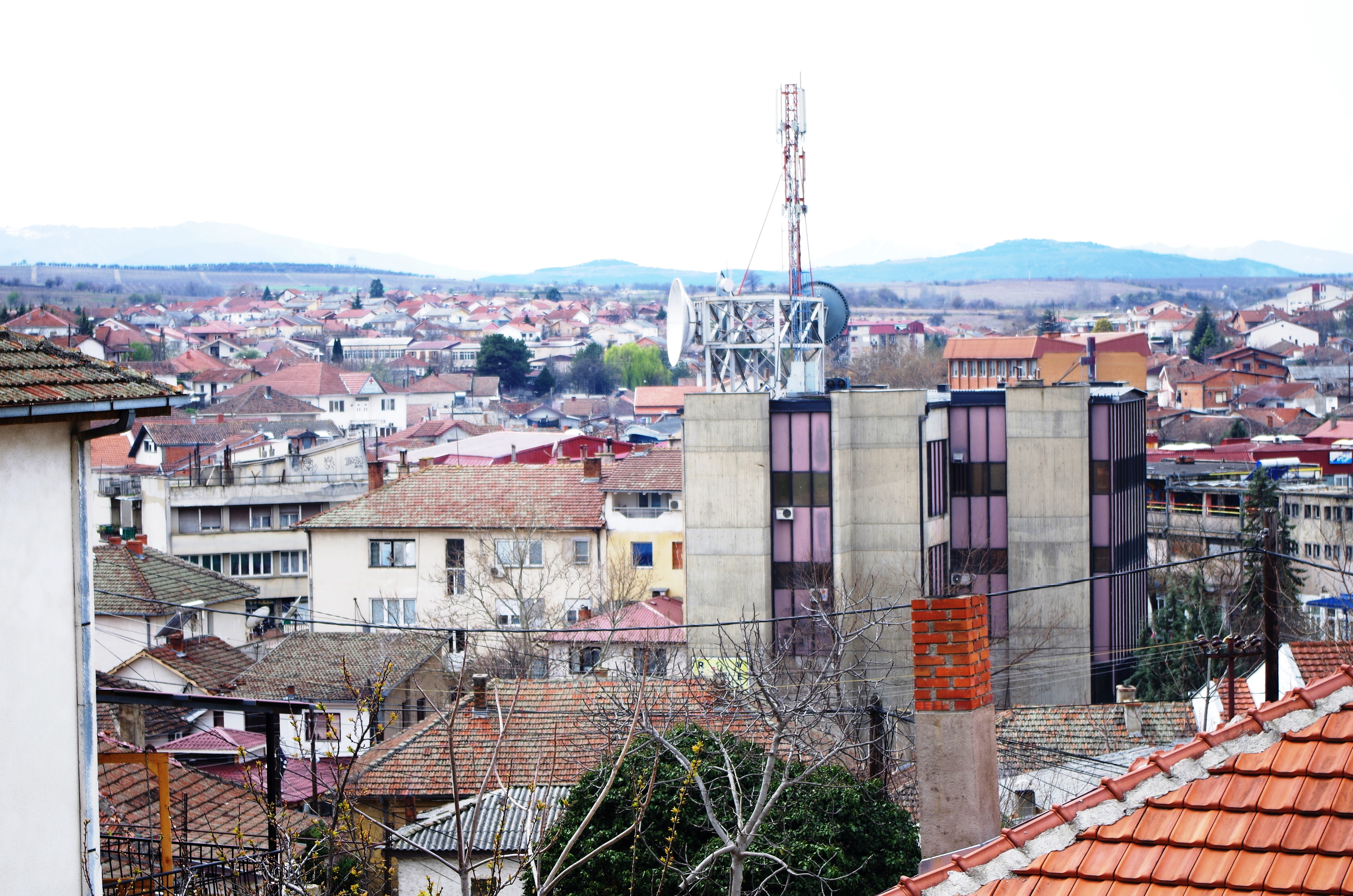
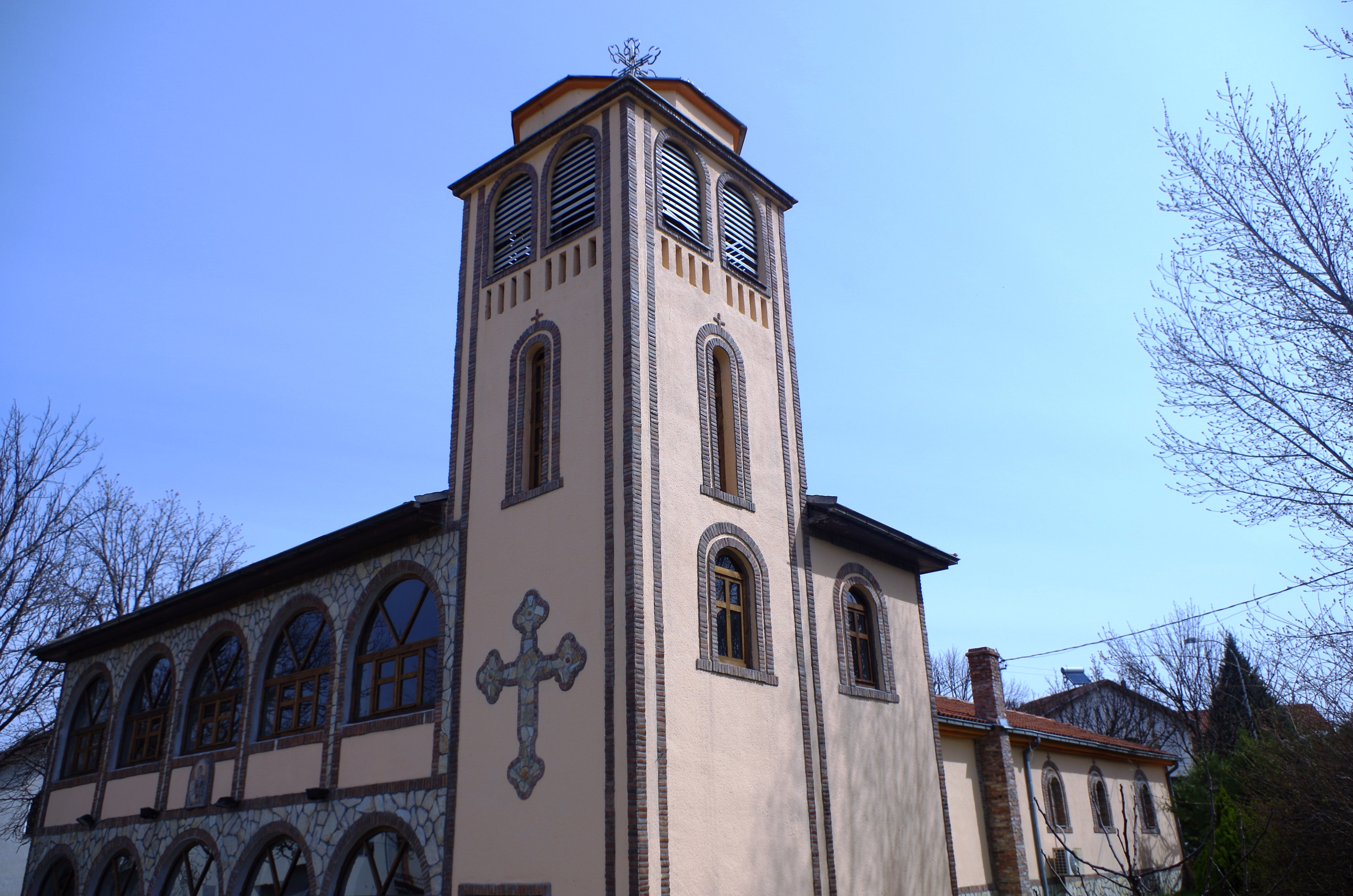
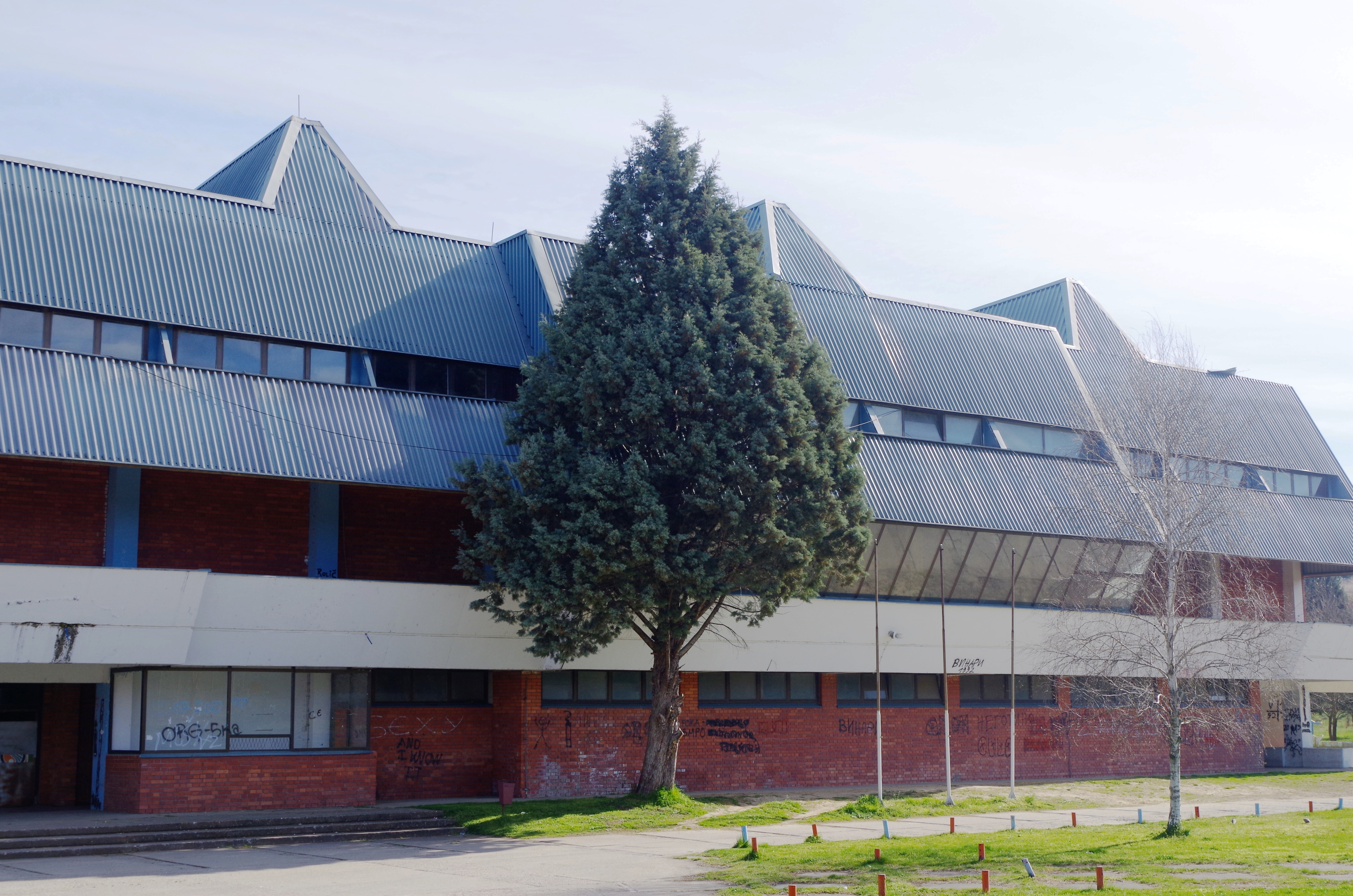
- From the top, View over Negotino, St Athanasius Church, Negotino Sports Hall

- Flag Coat of arms

- Location within North Macedonia
- Coordinates: 41°29′N 22°06′E
- Country: North Macedonia
- Region: Vardar
- Municipality: Negotino

Government
  - Mayor: Marija Naceva
- Highest elevation: 150 m (490 ft)

Population (2021)
  - Total: 12,488
- Time zone: UTC+1 (CET)
  - Summer (DST): UTC+2 (CEST)
- Postal code: 1440
- Area code: +389 043
- Vehicle registration: NE
- Climate: Cfa
- Website: www.negotino.gov.mk

Negotino (Macedonian: Неготино, pronounced [nɛˈɡɔtinɔ]) is a town in North Macedonia, the seat of the Negotino Municipality. Its population is about 12,500.

== Geography ==
Negotino is located on the right side of the river Vardar.

It is about 150 metres (490 ft) above sea level.

Negotino is in a vineyard region and the gates of the Tikveš plain, known for its fertility, are located nearby. Along with Kavadarci, Negotino is known as the home of North Macedonia's best wine and rakija (brandy).

The A1 highway leads through the city, parallel to the railway line connecting Skopje-Gevgelija-Greece.

== Industry ==
=== Wine ===
Negotino has an annual production of 20-25 million kilograms of grapes. The most common grape types are Chardonnay, Riesling, Sauvignon Blanc, Traminec, Smederevka, Muscat, Cabernet Sauvignon, Merlot, Pinot Noir, Plavac Mali, Vranec and Kadarka. Some of the more bigger wineries in terms of production are Bovin (Macedonian: Бовин), Lazar (Macedonian: Лазар) and Venec (Macedonian: Венец) winery.

== History ==
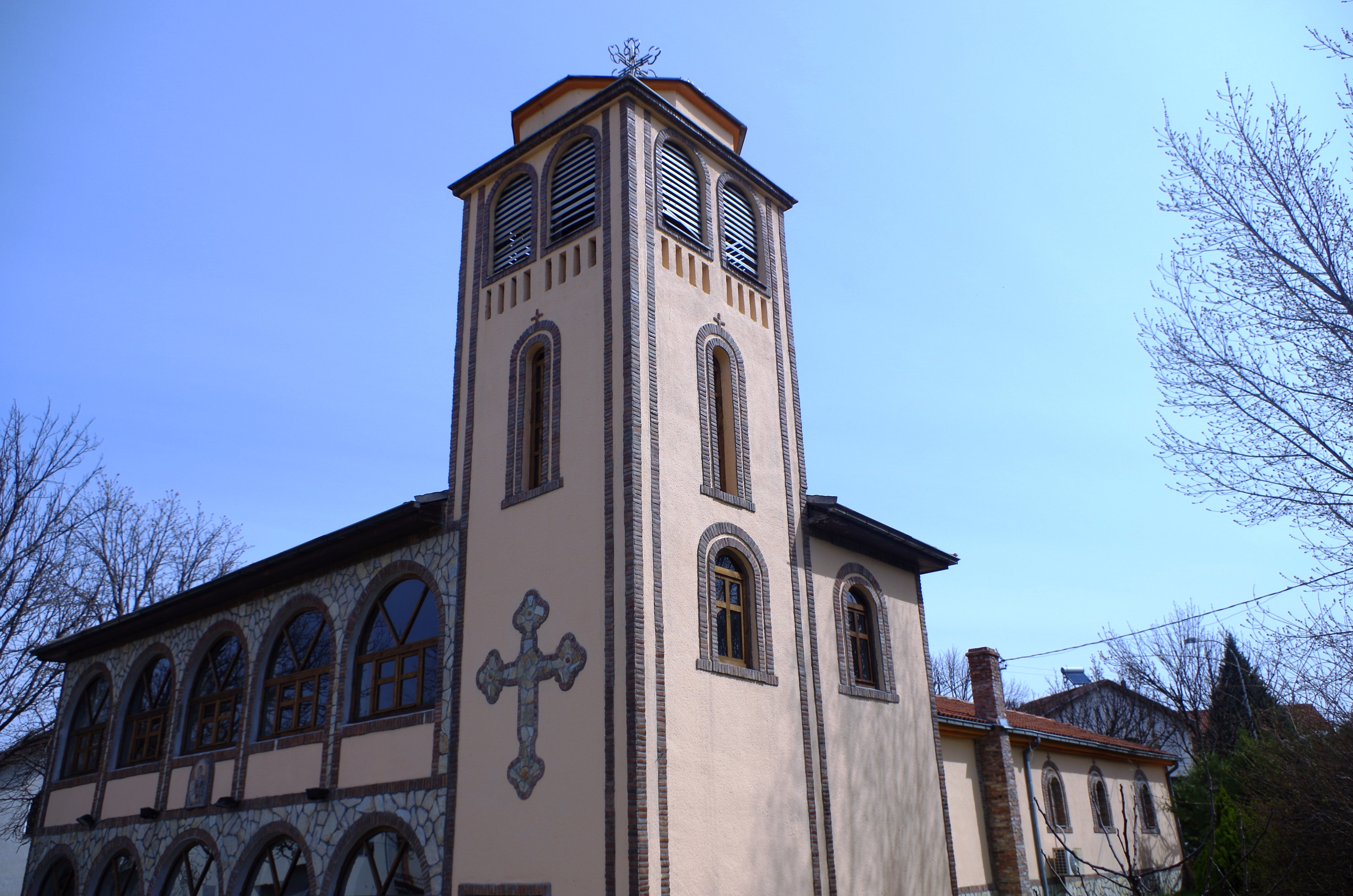
Church of St. Athanasius the Great in Negotino

A settlement in the location of modern Negotino existed and developed in antiquity.

Between 278 and 242 BC, a city was founded by King Antigonus II Gonatas, under the name of Antigoneia (Αντιγονεία in Greek). After conquering Paionia, he conquered the settlements around the central Vardar region.

Antigoneia was situated some twelve Roman miles south of the ancient city of Stobi, on the road to Thessaloniki, at the location of modern Gradiste, near the railway station of Negotino. At this place, Roman coins were found, as well as precious jewelry and other archeological findings from the period of the Roman and Byzantine period.

The ancient city existed until the 11th century when it was destroyed by a disastrous earthquake which hit almost all of the territory of Macedonia along with other cities such as Skupi, Stobi, Heraclea, Astibo, and Idomena.

According to the statistics of Bulgarian ethnographer Vasil Kanchov from 1900, 2,395 inhabitants lived in Negotino, 1,925 Bulgarian Christians, 320 Bulgarian Muslims, 90 Vlachs and 60 Romani.

From 1929 to 1941, Negotino was part of the Vardar Banovina of the Kingdom of Yugoslavia.

== Transport ==
The town is served by the Negotino railway station, with connections from Niš in Serbia to the port of Thessaloniki in Greece on the Aegean Sea (Corridor X), with Intercity services to Skopje and Thessaloniki in Greece.

== Twin towns — sister cities ==
Negotino is twinned with:

- Gradiška, Bosnia and Herzegovina, since 2006
- Nagykáta, Hungary, since 2013
