= Negotino Municipality =

Municipality of North Macedonia

Coordinates: 41.50°N 22.10°E

Municipality of Negotino Општина Неготино
- Urban municipality
- Flag Coat of arms

- Country: North Macedonia
- Region: Vardar
- Municipal seat: Negotino

Government
  - Mayor: Goran Stojanov (VMRO-DPMNE)

Area
  - Total: 414 km^{2} (160 sq mi)

Population
  - Total: 18,194
  - Density: 45.05/km^{2} (116.7/sq mi)
- Time zone: UTC+1 (CET)
- Postal code: 1440
- Area code: 043
- Vehicle registration: NE
- Website: http://www.negotino.gov.mk/

Negotino (Macedonian: Неготино, pronounced [nɛˈɡɔtinɔ]) is a municipality in eastern North Macedonia. Negotino is also the name of the town where the municipal seat is found. Negotino Municipality is part of Vardar Statistical Region.

== Geography ==
The municipality borders

- Štip Municipality to the north,
- Konče and Demir Kapija municipalities to the east,
- Gradsko and Rosoman municipalities to the west, and
- Kavadarci Municipality to the south.

== Demographics ==
According to the 2021 North Macedonia census, the municipality has a population of 18,194 people, with a density of 45,05 people/km^{2}. In the census of 1994 there were 18,341 people living within the borders of the municipality. Ethnic groups in the municipality:

	2002		2021	
	Number	%	Number	%
TOTAL	19,212	100	18,194	100
Macedonians	17,768	92.48	15,698	86.28
Roma	453	2.36	493	2.71
Turks	243	1.26	349	1.92
Serbs	627	3.26	344	1.89
Albanians	30	0.16	42	0.23
Vlachs	14	0.07	14	0.08
Bosniaks	1	0.01	1	0.01
Other / Undeclared / Unknown	76	0.4	255	1.39
Persons for whom data are taken from administrative sources			998	5.49

== Inhabited places ==
The number of inhabited places in the municipality is 19, one town and 18 villages.

Inhabited places in Negotino Municipality
Villages: Brusnik | Vešje | Vojšanci | Gorni Disan | Dolni Disan | Dubrevo | Janoševo | Kalanjevo | Krivolak | Kurija | Lipa | Pepelište | Pešternica | Timjanik | Tremnik | Crveni Bregovi | Djidimirci | Šeoba | Towns: Negotino
