= Drenovo, Kavadarci =

Drenovo Дреново
- Village
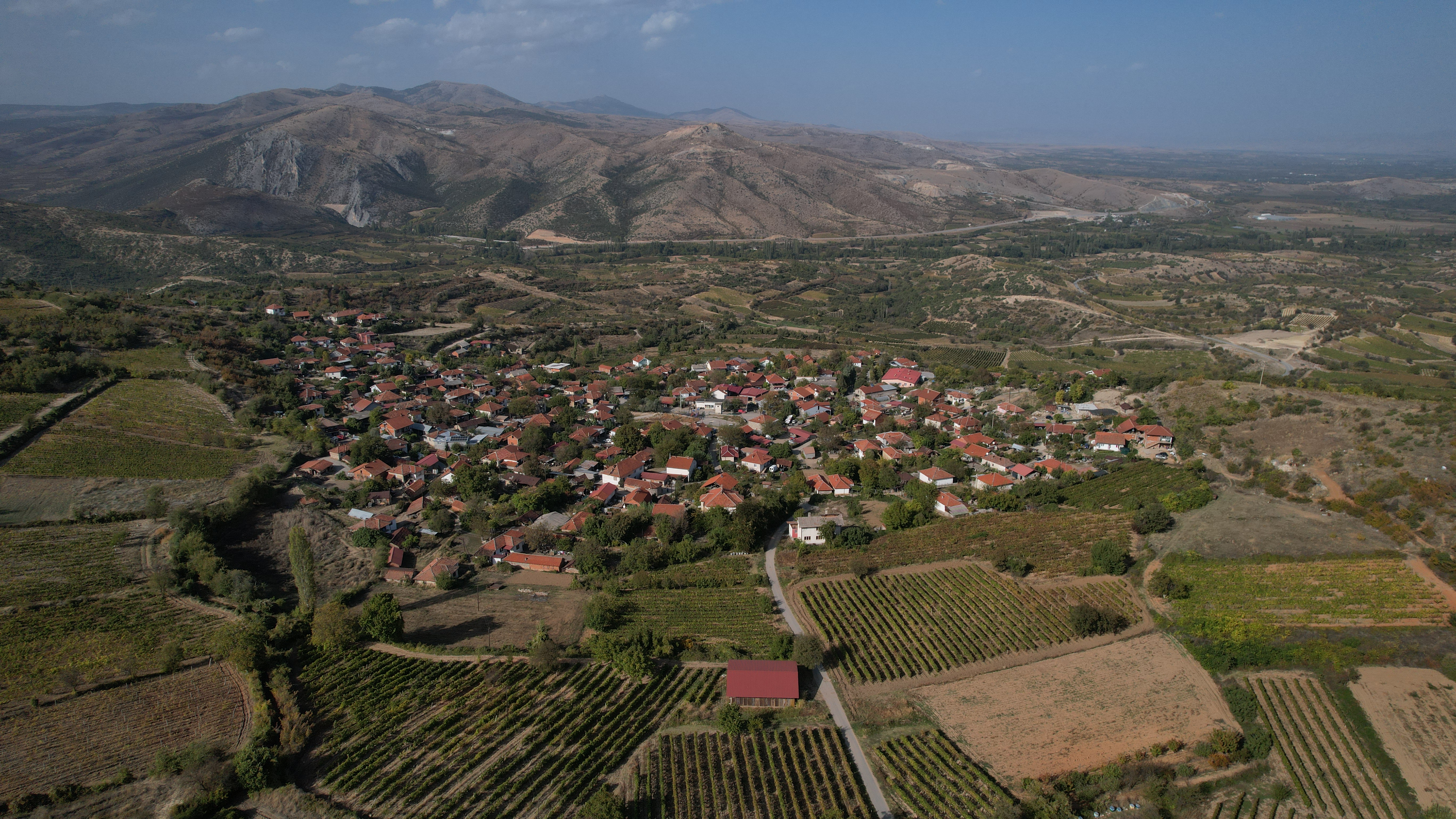
- A view of Drenovo in 2023

- Location within North Macedonia
- Coordinates: 41.419262°N 21.889670°E
- Country: North Macedonia
- Region: Vardar
- Municipality: Kavadarci

Population (2021)
  - Total: 508
- Time zone: UTC+1 (CET)
  - Summer (DST): UTC+2 (CEST)
- Website: .

Drenovo (Macedonian: Дреново) is a village in the municipality of Kavadarci, North Macedonia.

== Demographics ==
On the 1927 ethnic map of Leonhard Schulze-Jena, the village is shown as a Muslims village. According to the 2002 census, the village had a total of 648 inhabitants. Ethnic groups in the village include: According to the census of 2021, 508 residents lived in the village, of which 438 were Macedonians, 1 Albanian, 1 Serb, and 68 people without data.

- Macedonians 438
- Serbs 1
- Albanians 1
