= Macedonian wine =

Wine making in North Macedonia

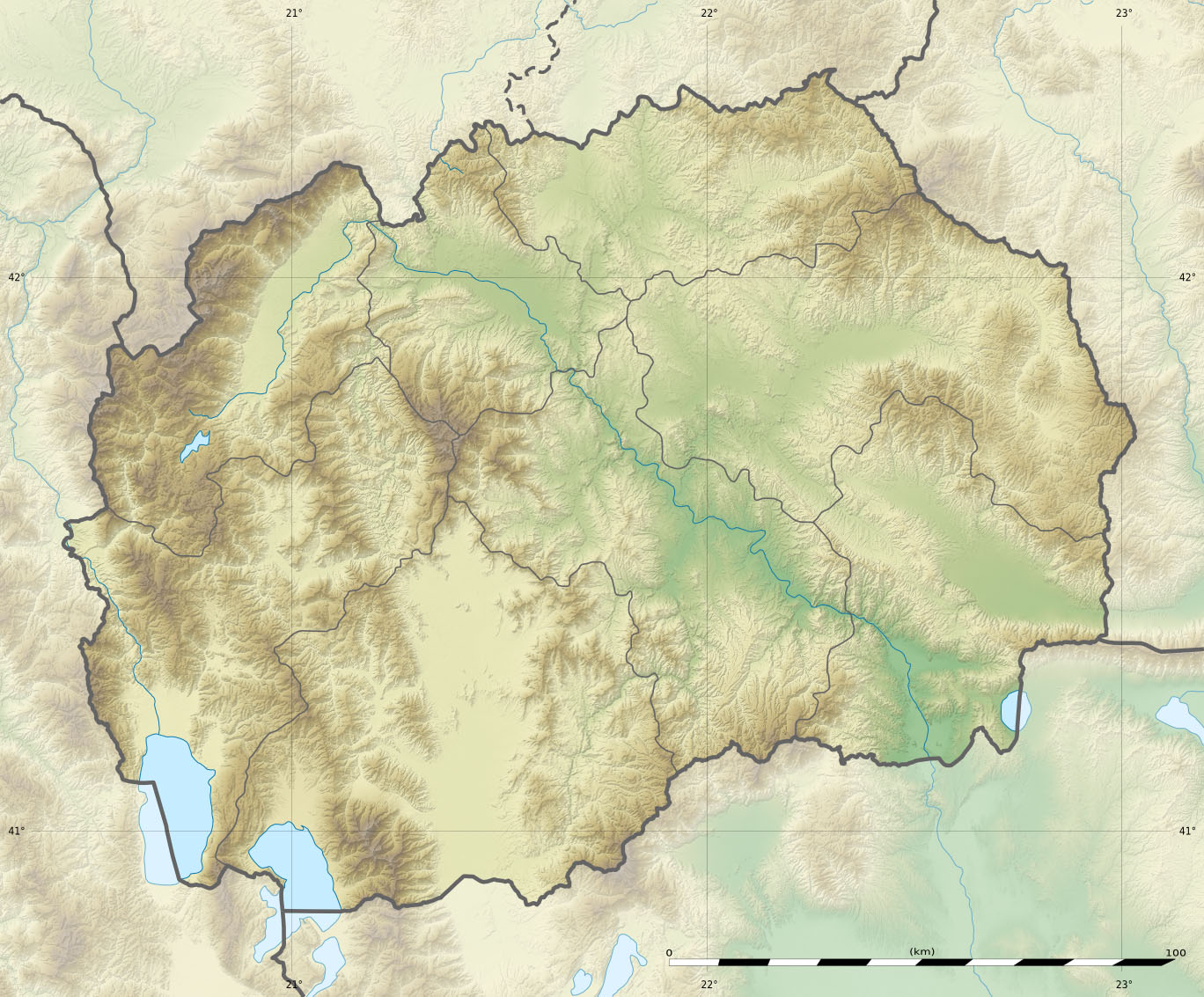
North Macedonia

North Macedonia produces wine on some 22,400 hectares (55,000 acres) of vineyards, and the production was 108,100 tonnes in 2008. There are also some additional 30,000 hectares (74,000 acres) of vineyards dedicated to table grapes. Red wine dominates the Macedonian wine production, with around 80 per cent.

In contrast, within the European Union, "Macedonia" is a protected geographical indication (PGI) for wines produced in the Greek viticulture region of Macedonia.

== History ==
While part of Yugoslavia, Macedonia was a producer of wine and mastika. In the 1980s, it accounted for around two-thirds of the Yugoslav wine production. After the breakup of Yugoslavia, the wine production of the new country decreased dramatically, from 1.8 million hectoliters in the mid-1990s to 447,000 hl in 2002.

== Wine regions ==
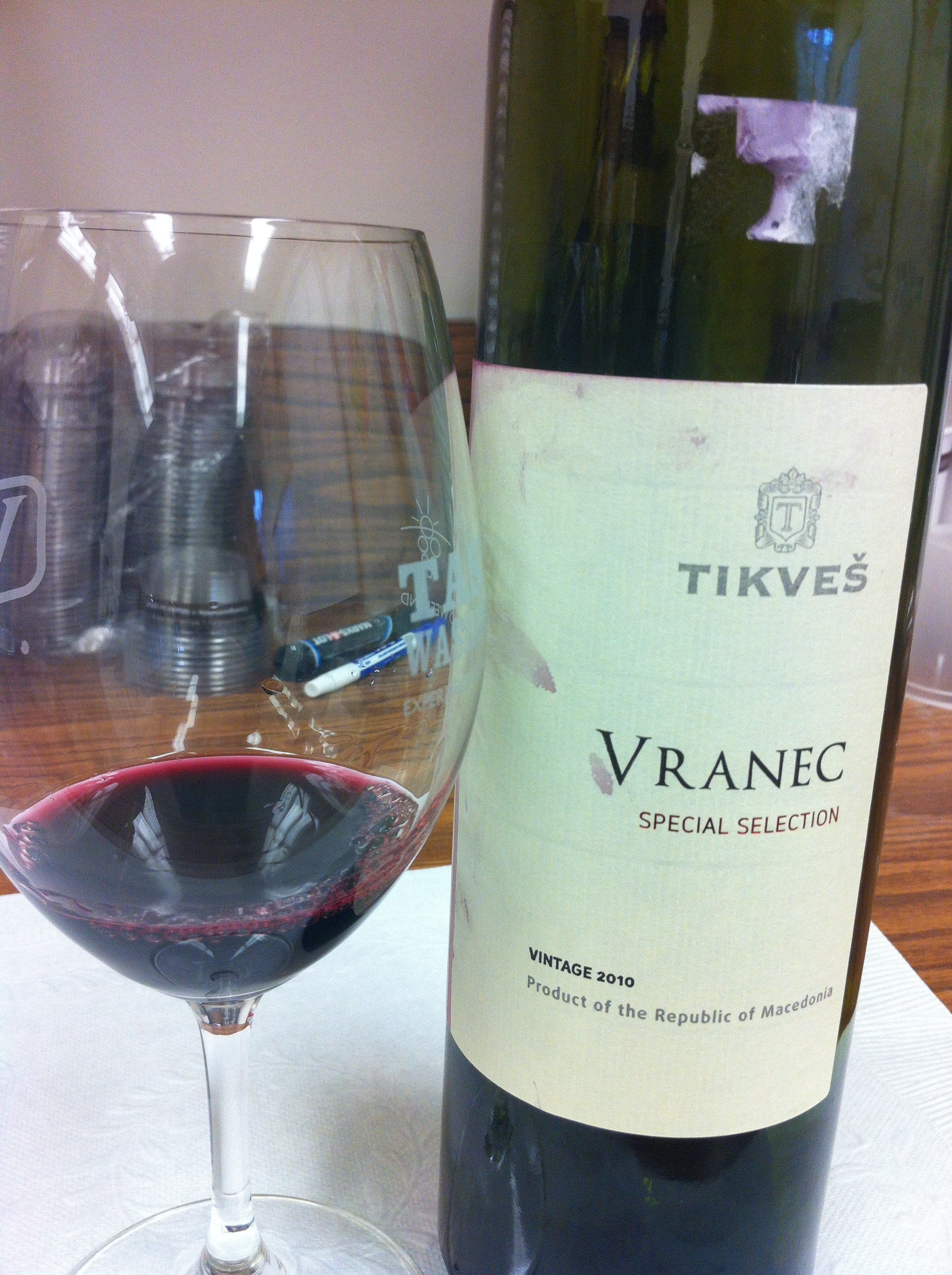
A 2010 Vranec from Macedonia.

North Macedonia has three wine-growing regions:

- Povardarie, in the valley of river Vardar, mostly around the towns of Negotino and Kavadarci. It is the most important region both in terms of quantity and wine quality.
- Pčinja-Osogovo, to the east on the border with Bulgaria.
- Pelagonija-Polog, around Lake Ohrid, to the west on the border with Albania.

== Grape varieties ==
The grape varieties common in cultivation includes a large proportion of indigenous varieties and varieties common to Central Europe and the Balkans, as well as some international varieties. Red varieties include Vranec (the most common variety of North Macedonia), Kratosija, Cabernet Sauvignon and Merlot. Stanušina Crna is a unique variety of grape of local origin from North Macedonia, capable of producing very high quality wines, very popular on domestic market, little known outside its native country. White varieties include Smederevka, Welschriesling (usually referred to as Laški Rizling), Chardonnay, Sauvignon blanc and Žilavka.

== See also ==
- Winemaking
- Agriculture in North Macedonia
