= Povardarie =

Povardarie (Macedonian: Повардарие) is a geographic region in the central part of North Macedonia, and includes all of the canyons, mountains, and valleys through which the Vardar river flows.

The term is used in the names of Diocese of Povardarie of the Macedonian Orthodox Church and "Eparchy of Veles and Povardarie" of the Orthodox Ohrid Archbishopric.
