= Bulgarian Muslims =

Ethnoreligious group

The Muslim Bulgarians (Bulgarian: Българи-мохамедани, romanized: Bǎlgari-mohamedani, lit. 'Bulgarian Mohammedans', as of recently also Българи-мюсюлмани, Bǎlgari-mjusjulmani, locally called Pomak, ahryan, poganets, marvak, or poturnak) are Bulgarians who follow the faith of Islam. They are generally thought to be the descendants of the indigenous Slavs who converted to Islam during Ottoman rule. Most scholars have agreed that the Bulgarian Muslims are a "religious group of Bulgarian Slavs who speak Bulgarian as their mother tongue and do not understand Turkish, but whose religion and customs are Islamic".

== Location ==
Bulgarian Muslims live mostly in the Rhodopes – Smolyan Province, the southern part of the Pazardzhik and Kardzhali Provinces and the eastern part of the Blagoevgrad Province in Southern Bulgaria. They also live in a group of villages in the Lovech Province in Northern Bulgaria. The name Pomak is pejorative in Bulgarian and is resented by most members of the community, The name adopted and used instead of Pomak is Bulgarian Muslims. The Smolyan Province, which is largely populated by Bulgarian Muslims (approximately 117,000 or 71% of the population according to the Ministry of Interior in 1989). According to the 2001 census, 43 municipalities out of 262 have a Muslim majority. There were five municipalities with a Muslim population over 90 percent: Chernoochene (96.8 percent) has the highest share of Muslims, followed by Venets (95.9 percent), Satovcha (91.3 percent), Ruen (90.9 percent) and Kaolinovo (90.0 percent)(122,806 or 87.7%) and that only 58,758 people or 41.9% of the population of the province declared to profess Islam in 2001.

Muslims in Bulgaria have slightly better demographic indicators compared to the Orthodox Christians in Bulgaria. The reason for this difference is mostly because of ethnicity most Muslims in Bulgaria have different marriage traditions and a younger age structure compared to the ethnic Bulgarians which leads to higher fertility and birth rates. In provinces with large Muslim concentrations, birth rates are a little bit higher while death rates are lower than the country average. For example: Bulgaria had a total birth rate of 10.5% in 1992 while Muslims formed about 13 percent of the total population. However, in provinces with large Muslim populations the birth rate ranged from in 11.0% in Smolyan and 11.6% in Silistra to 13.1% in Razgrad (>50 percent Muslim) and 14.7% in Kardzhali (about 70 percent Muslim).

== Identity ==
Bulgarian Muslims do not represent a homogenous community and have a multitude of ethnic and religious identities. A clear majority of them (127,350 according to the latest census in 2001) declare themselves to be ethnic Bulgarians of Islamic faith. However, a significant percentage, in particular in the Central and Eastern Rhodopes (the Smolyan and Kardzhali Province) are strongly religious and have preserved the Muslim name system, customs and clothing.

A small number of Bulgarian Muslims less than 50, from the Central and Eastern Rhodopes, have converted into Orthodox Christianity or have adopted a Christian identity since 1990.

The use of Bulgarian names among Muslims is common. For example, only one-third of the Muslim Bulgarian population of the region of Kirkovo, mostly people aged over 60, have Turkish or Arabic names.

Unlike the Bulgarian Muslims in the Central and Eastern Rhodopes, who usually have a Bulgarian identity, the ones living on the western fringes of the Rhodopes (in the provinces of Pazardzhik and Blagoevgrad) largely Identify as Turkish. For example, out of 62,431 self-declared Muslims in the Blagoevgrad Province in 2001, 31,857 (more than half) have opted for Turkish ethnicity although the self-declared speakers of Turkish as a mother tongue are only 19,819.

Considering that mother tongue in the Bulgarian census is counted on the basis of a declaration of the respondent and not on actual proof of what language the said person speaks at home. That an inquiry of the Ministry of the Interior in 1989 gave only 3,689 ethnic Turks and 56,191 Pomaks for the Blagoevgrad Province, it is highly likely that the vast majority of the Turks in the province are actually Pomaks. A similar phenomenon exists in the Pazardzhik Province where there may be between 10,000 and 15,000 Pomaks.

Almost 64% of Muslims in Bulgaria that are ethnically Turks live in Kardzhali, Razgrad, Targovishte, Shumen, Silistra, Dobrich Ruse, and Burgas. They live mostly in rural settlements. Muslims in Bulgaria that are ethnically Roma mainly live in Shumen, Sliven, Dobrich, Targovishte, Pazardzhik and Silistra. Pomak Muslims mainly live around the Rhodope Mountains, especially in the province Smolyan and the municipalities of Satovcha, Yakoruda, Belitsa, Garmen, Gotse Delchev, Ardino, Krumovgrad, Kirkovo and Velingrad.

A large part of the population in those areas did not respond to the census questions which makes it difficult to calculate the exact number of Pomaks. In the municipality of Dospat for example, only 4746 people out of 9116 answered the question on their religion and in the municipality of Satovcha only 9562 out of 15444 people did so. Tatar Muslims live in northeastern Bulgaria and the small Arab diaspora is based mainly in the capital, Sofia.

Finally, there are those Bulgarian Muslims who have chosen not to declare their ethnicity in the 2001 Census. The percentage of undeclared in the Smolyan Province (9,696 or 6.9%), the Kardzhali Province (4,565 or 2.8%) and the Blagoevgrad Province (4,242 or 1.2%) is well above the national average of 0.8%. These are most likely to be Muslim Bulgarians who would have opted for another ethnicity, for example "Pomak" or "Muslim", if these were allowed as answers at the census or are unclear themselves about their own ethnic identity.

Due to the multitude of different ethnic and religious identities of the Muslim Bulgarians, it is extremely difficult to calculate the exact number of the members of the community in Bulgaria. An inquiry conducted by the Bulgarian Ministry of the Interior in 1989 estimated their number at 269,000.

A summation of the different groups with different ethnic identities (approximately 130,000 Muslim Bulgarians, approximately 55,000-65,000 Bulgarians, up to 50,000 Muslim Turks, 15,000 to 20,000 undeclared) yields approximately the same number. Despite the multitude of different ethnic the predominant ethnic identity would be Bulgarian (approximately 200,000 or three-quarters of the total population) and the predominant religious identity would be Muslim.

Muslim Bulgarians in the Rhodopes speak a variety of archaic Bulgarian dialects. Under the influence of mass media and school education, the dialects have been almost completely unified with standard Bulgarian among Muslim Bulgarians living in Bulgaria.

== In Turkey ==
Thracian Bulgarians in East Thrace in Turkey, descended from the people and families who converted to Islam in order to stay and avoid being deported to Bulgaria. Bulgarian historian Lyubomir Miletich wrote a book in 1918 detailing these events called the Destruction of the Thracian Bulgarians in 1913.

== See also ==
- Islam in Bulgaria
- Pomaks
- Bulgarian Turks
- Tatars in Bulgaria
- Torbesh
- Greek Muslims
- Cheveneburi
- Lazs
- Hamshenis
