= Ruins in North Macedonia =

List of archaeological and historic sites

There are possibly more than 100 archaeological or historic ruins in North Macedonia. Civilizations in the past left behind many structures such as castles, fortresses, churches, and aqueducts. Ruins can be seen today all over the Macedonian countryside. Factors such as environmental changes, changes in settlements, populations, migrations, and changes in neighbouring colonies or tribes all played a key role in the movement of people within the region of Macedonia.

== Archaeological sites in North Macedonia ==
Below is a list of sites and their locations :

Archaeological site	Location	Period	Year
Stobi	Gradsko	Paionia	Unknown
Astibo	Štip	Roman Empire	Possibly 4th Century
Ancient Theatre	Ohrid	Ancient Macedonia	200 BC
Skopje Aqueduct	Skopje	Roman Empire	2nd Century
Heraclea Lyncestis	Bitola	Ancient Macedonia	4th Century BC
St. Erasmus Cave Church	Ohrid	Byzantine Empire	6th Century
Church of St. John at Kaneo	Ohrid	Second Bulgarian Empire	13th Century
Golem Grad	Golem Grad	Ancient Macedonia	2nd Century BC
Samuel's Fortress	Ohrid	Ancient Macedonia	4th Century BC
Marko's Towers	Prilep	Serbian Empire	14th Century
Church of Saint Sophia	Ohrid	First Bulgarian Empire	1035
Bylazora	Sveti Nikole	Paionia	Unknown
Stuberra	Čepigovo	Ancient Macedonia	4th Century
Mančevci	Ohrid	Byzantine Empire	5th century
Ancient Macedonian tomb	Bonče	Ancient Macedonia	1st century BC
Idomenae	Marvinci	Ancient Macedonia	6th century BC
Bargala	Kozjak	Thrace	Unknown
Kokino	Kokino	Unknown	Unknown
Vardarski Rid	Gevgelija	Ancient Macedonia	Unknown
Tauresium	Taor	Dardania	Unknown
Gordynia	Gevgelija	Ancient Macedonia	Unknown
Scupi	Skopje	Dardania	3rd century BC
Antania	Mariovo	Ancient Macedonia	Unknown
Cerje	Skopje	Unknown	Unknown
Bučin	Kruševo	Ottoman Empire	Unknown
Alcomenae	Pelagonia	Ancient Macedonia	Unknown

== Ancient Macedonian sites ==
Archaeological site	Location	Period	Year
Heraclea Lyncestis	Bitola	Ancient Macedonia	4th Century BC
Ancient Theatre	Ohrid	Ancient Macedonia	200 BC
Stuberra	Čepigovo	Ancient Macedonia	4th Century
Ancient Macedonian tomb	Bonče	Ancient Macedonia	1st century BC
Idomenae	Marvinci	Ancient Macedonia	6th century BC
Vardarski Rid	Gevgelija	Ancient Macedonia	6th century BC
Golem Grad	Golem Grad	Ancient Macedonia	2nd Century BC
Gordynia	Gevgelija	Ancient Macedonia	Unknown
Antania	Mariovo	Ancient Macedonia	Unknown
Samuel's Fortress	Ohrid	Ancient Macedonia	4th Century BC
Alcomenae	Pelagonia	Ancient Macedonia	Unknown

== Paionian sites ==
Archaeological site	Location	Period	Year
Stobi	Gradsko	Paionia	Unknown
Bylazora	Sveti Nikole	Paionia	Unknown

== Thracian and Bulgarian sites ==
Archaeological site	Location	Period	Year
Church of St. John at Kaneo	Ohrid	Second Bulgarian Empire	13th Century
Bargala	Kozjak	Thrace	Unknown

== Dardanian sites ==
Archaeological site	Location	Period	Year
Church of St. John at Kaneo	Ohrid	Second Bulgarian Empire	13th Century
Scupi	Skopje	Dardania	Unknown

== Historic sites in North Macedonia ==
Below is a list of sites and their locations :

- Plaosnik, located in Ohrid.
- St Panteleimon, located in Ohrid.
