= Plaošnik =

Archaeological site in Ohrid, North Macedonia

Coordinates: 41°06′45.85″N 20°47′28.48″E

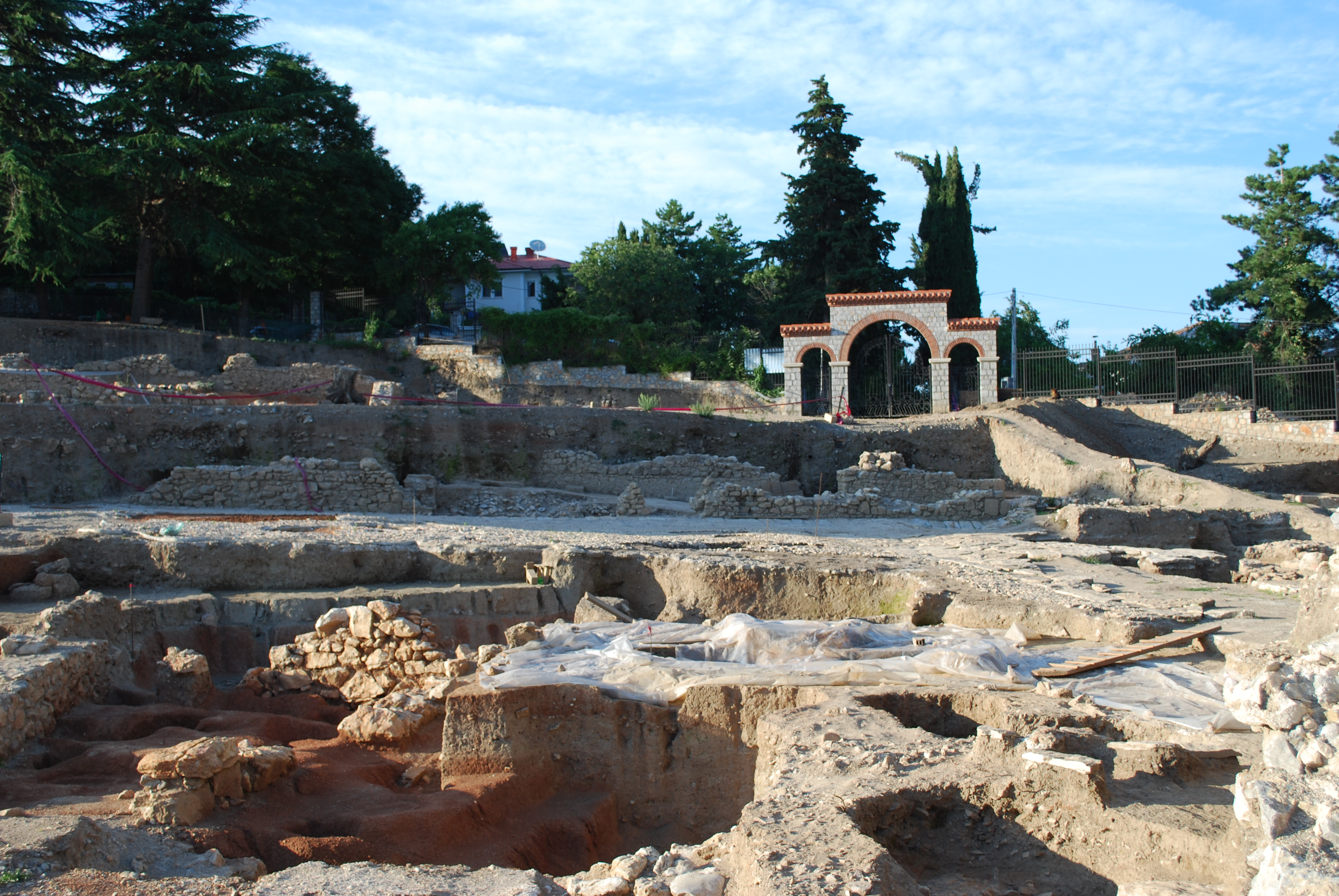
Plaošnik

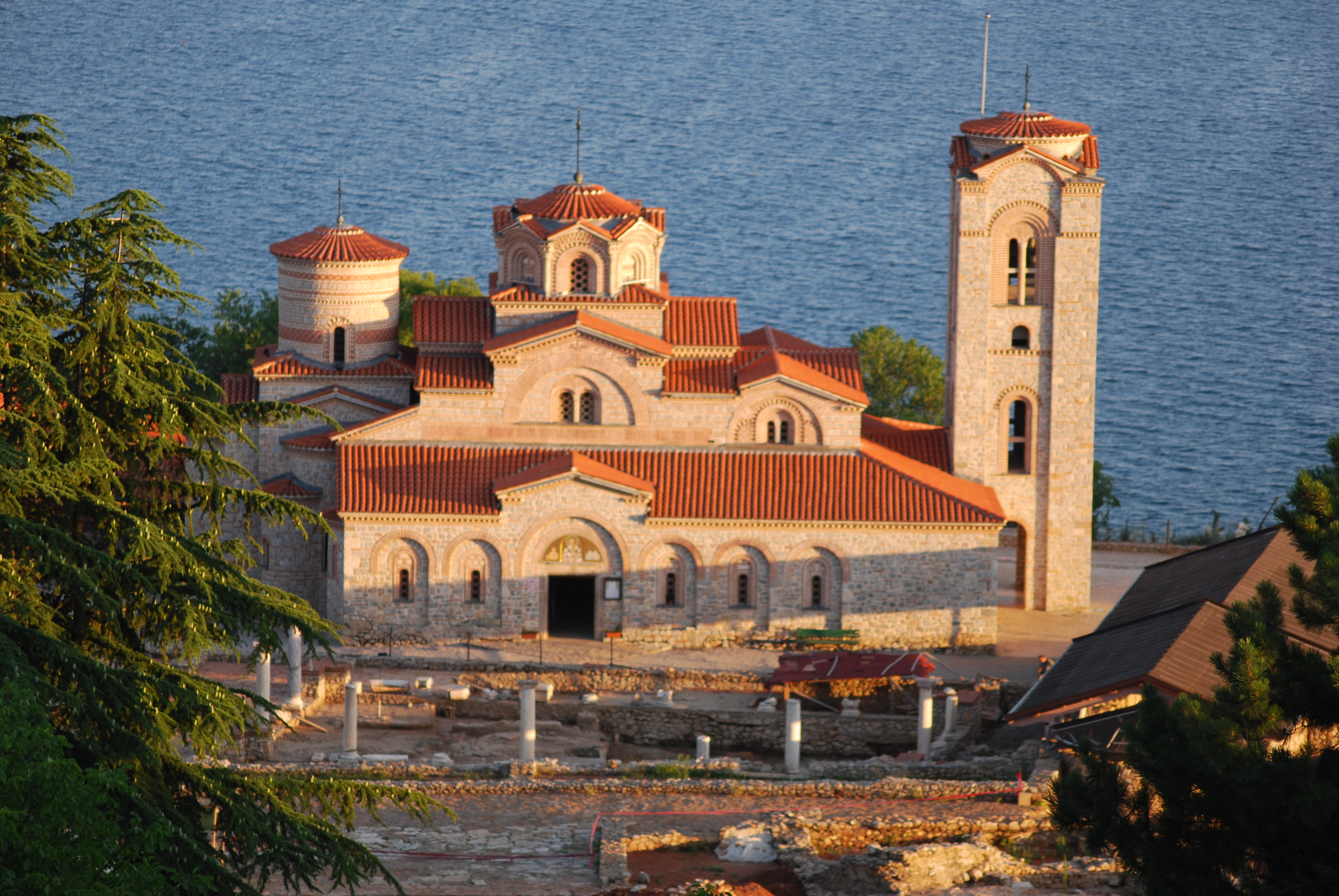
St. Clement's Church

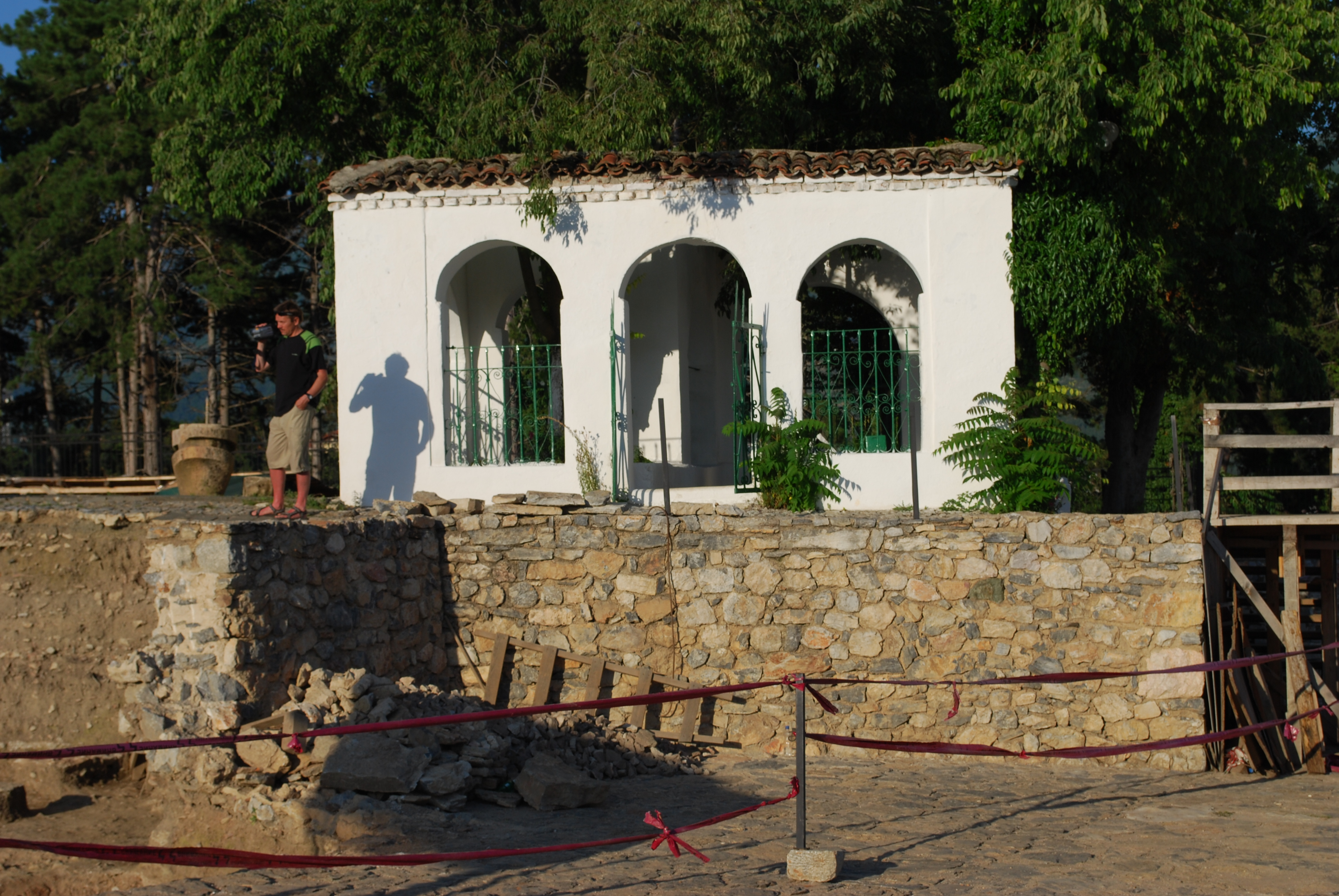
Muslim tombs

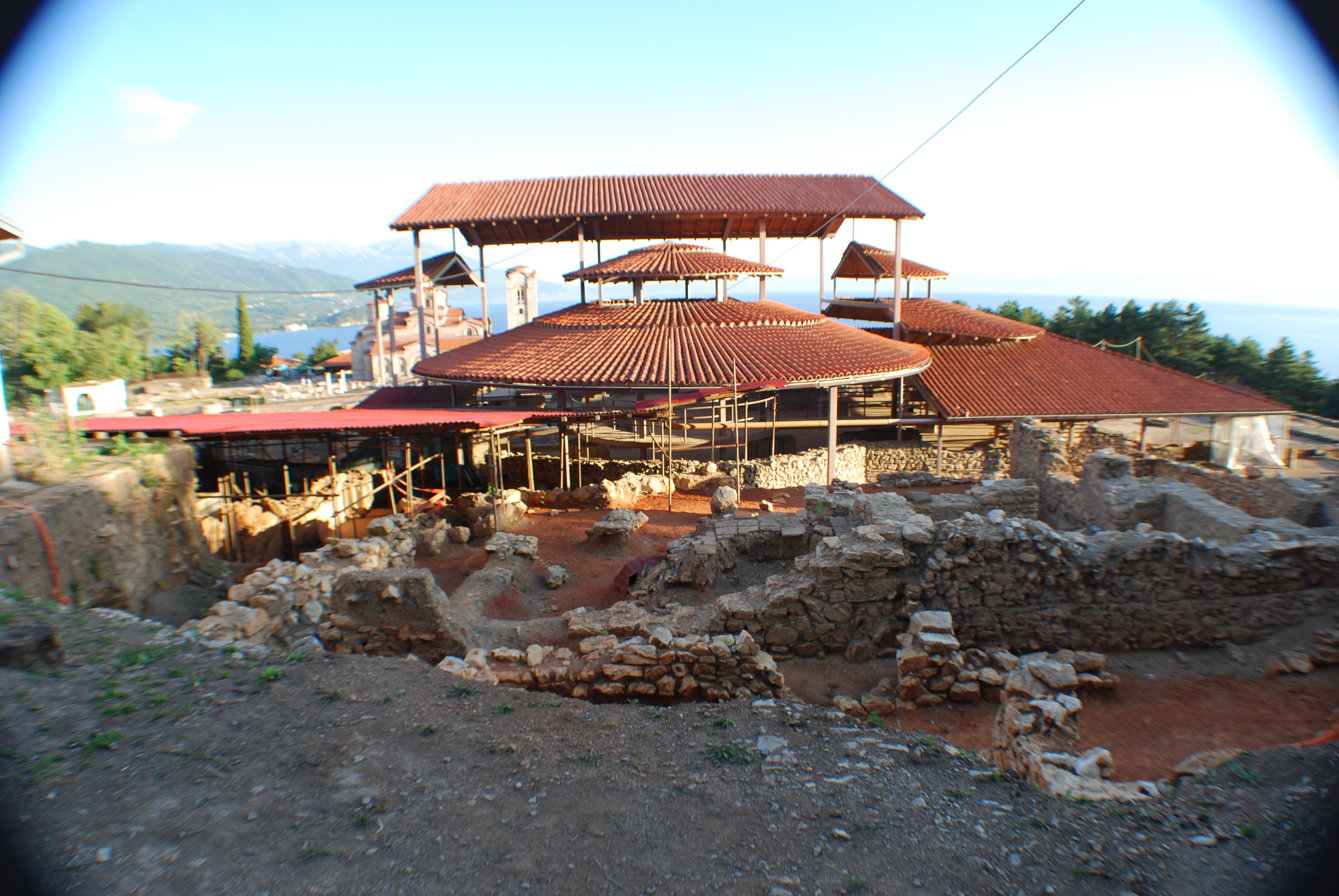
Christian basilica

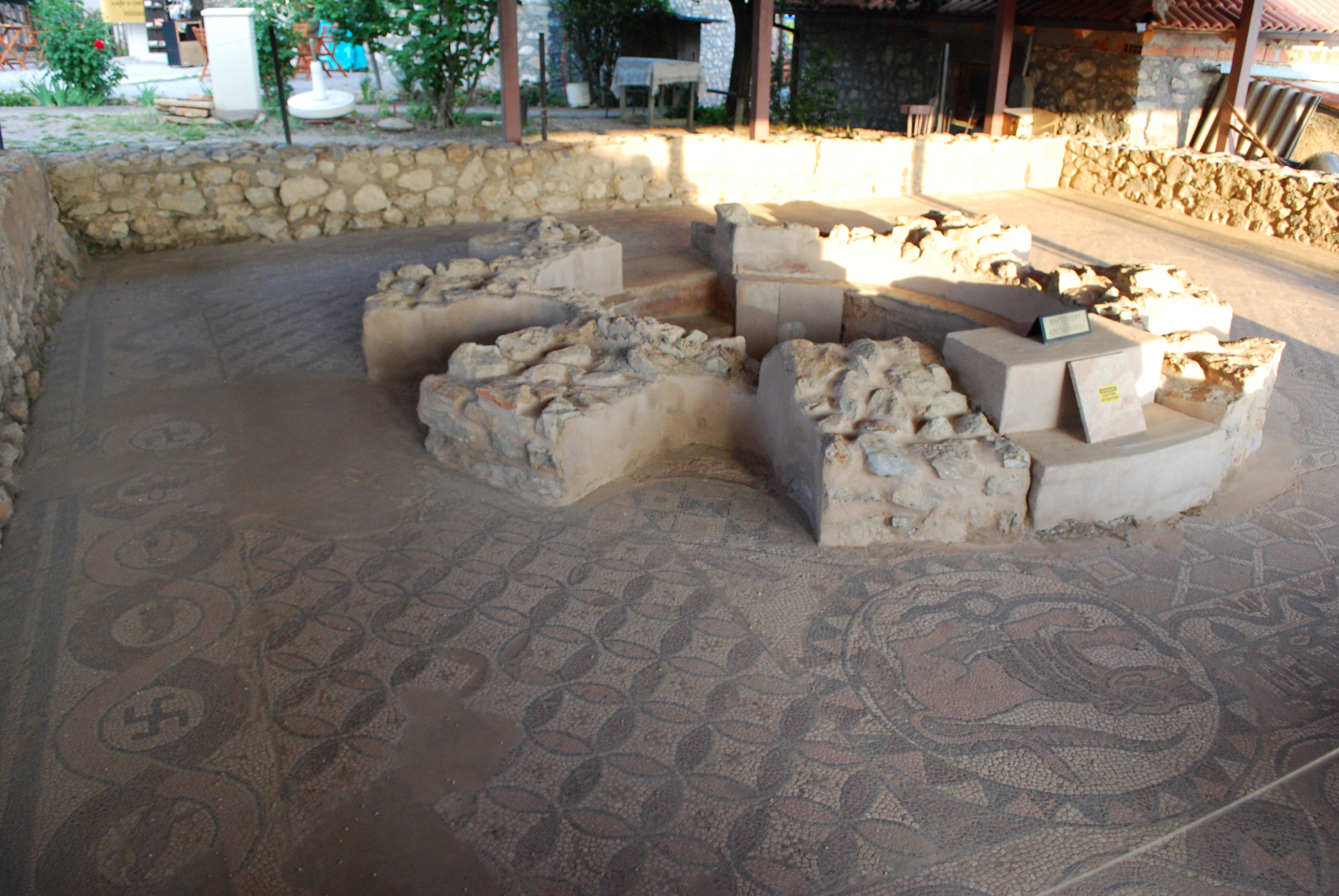
The Baptistery

Plaošnik or simply Plaoš (Macedonian: Плаошник, Плаош) is an archaeological site and holy place in Ohrid, North Macedonia, located 250 meters south of Samuil's Fortress. The site is in the process of being restored to its original condition.

== Archaeological sites ==
=== St. Clement's Church ===
The church was built by St. Clement in the year 893, on the foundation of an earlier Christian basilica, and dedicated to St. Panteleimon.

After the advent of the Ottoman Empire, St. Clement's church was converted to a mosque, known as the Imaret Mosque (Turkish: İmaret Camii), of which only a small enclosure remains. The mosque was built as an endowment and a memorial by Sinan Chelebi, member of the distinguished Turkish family of the Ohrizade. The Imaret Mosque was torn down in 2000 with the reason given that it was constructed over the remains of a church in the Plaošnik area and the former mosque was added to the damaged religious buildings list compiled by the Islamic Religious Community of Macedonia.

It has undergone extensive reconstructions during the Ottoman period, and excavations in the contemporary period.

On 10 October 2007, a deposit of approximately 2,383 Venetian coins was discovered by archaeologists while excavating the monastery. A prominent archaeologist of the Republic of Macedonia, Pasko Kuzman, stated that the coins are of special significance because they indicate that Ohrid and Venice were commercially linked.

== Gallery ==
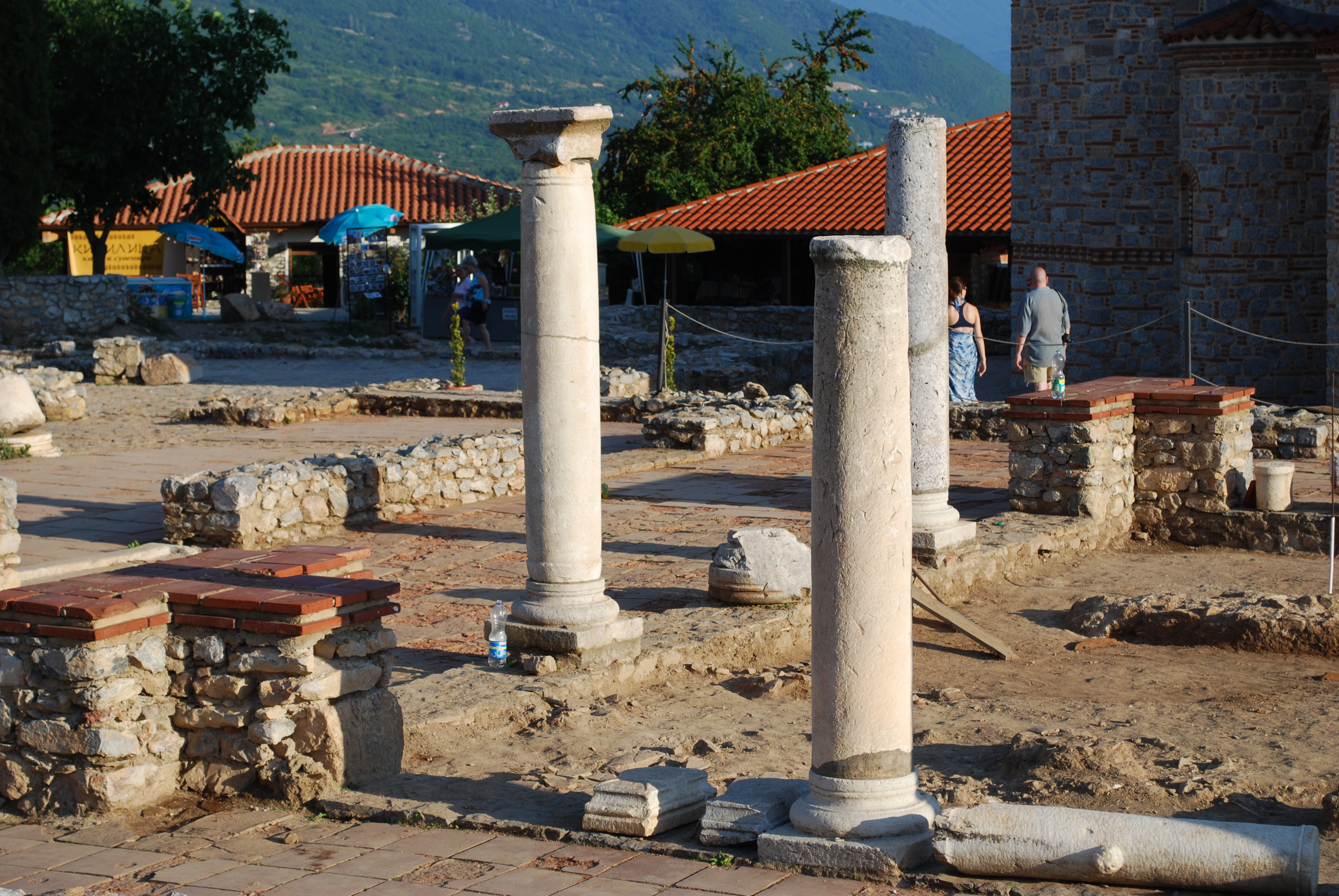
Plaošnik

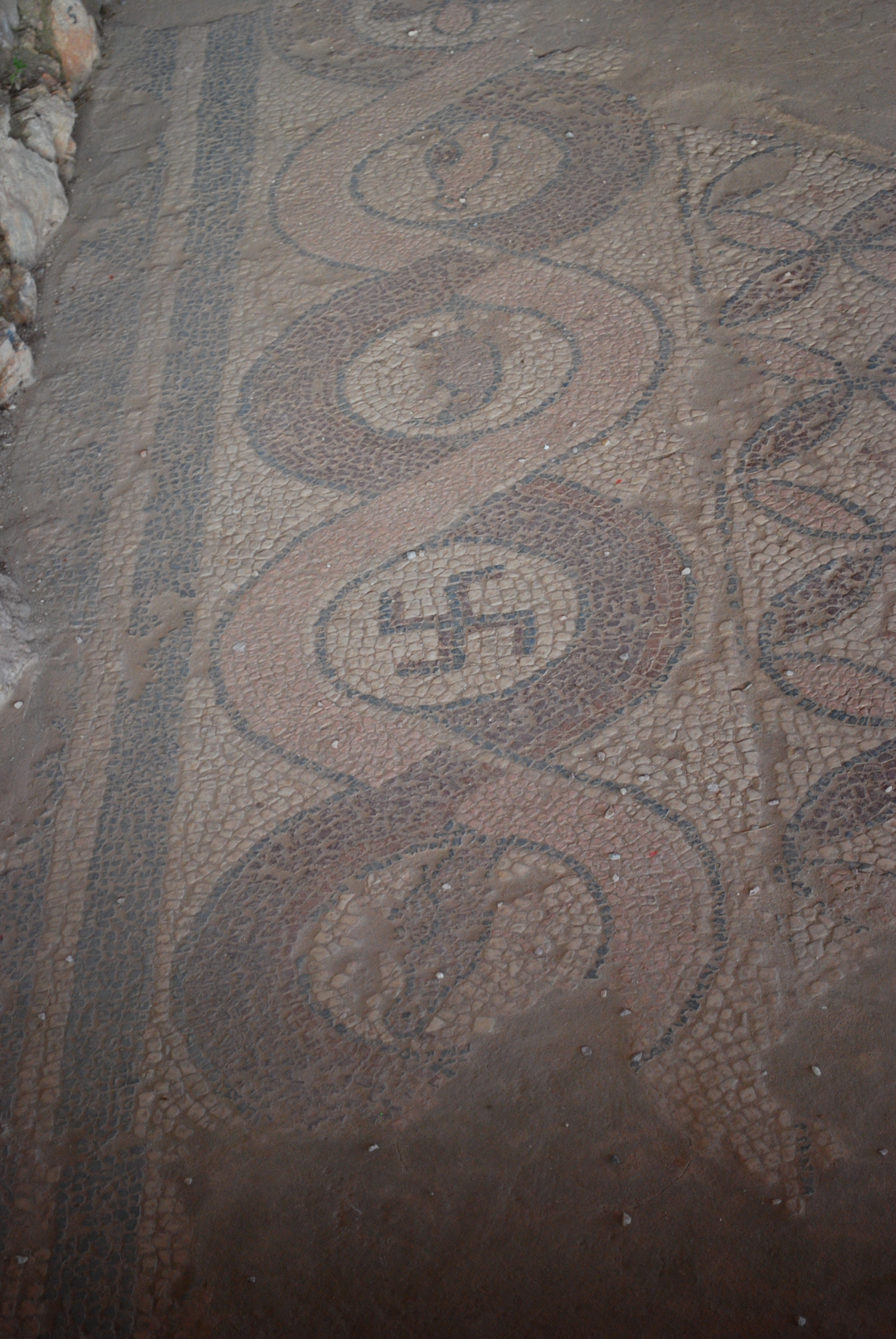
Swastika

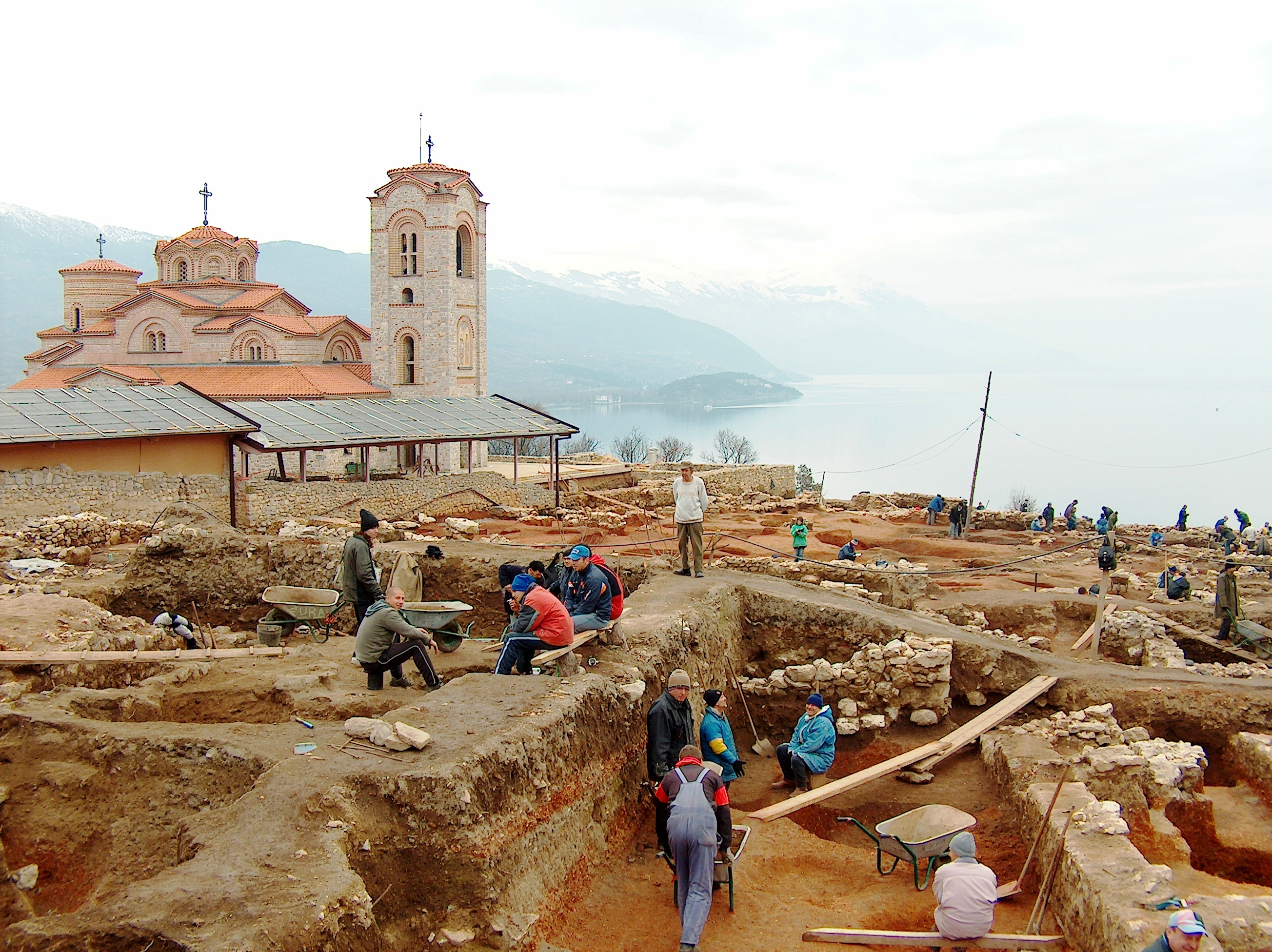
Some archaeological works on Plaošnik
