= Antania =

Antania (Ancient Greek: Αντανιάς, Macedonian: Антанија) was a town in ancient Macedonia. It was located in the region of Lyncestis. The town's name is connected with the tribe of Antanoi, whose existence is known only from an inscription found at Heraclea Lyncestis. In the late Roman period, Antania was an Episcopal seat. The ruins of the episcopal basilica and other structures were discovered near the present-day Chebren Monastery in the region of Mariovo, North Macedonia.

== Gallery ==
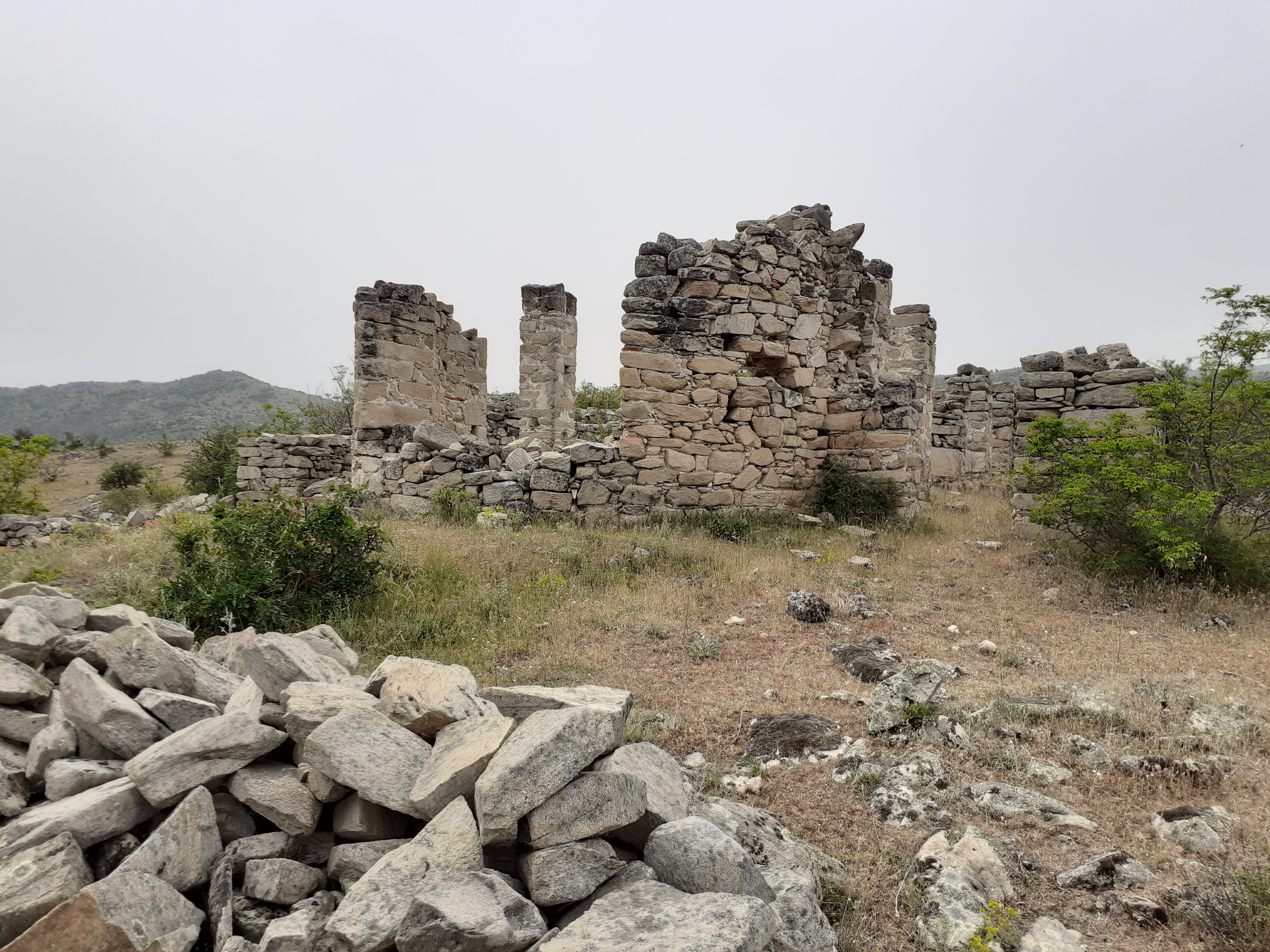
Ruins of the ancient basilica

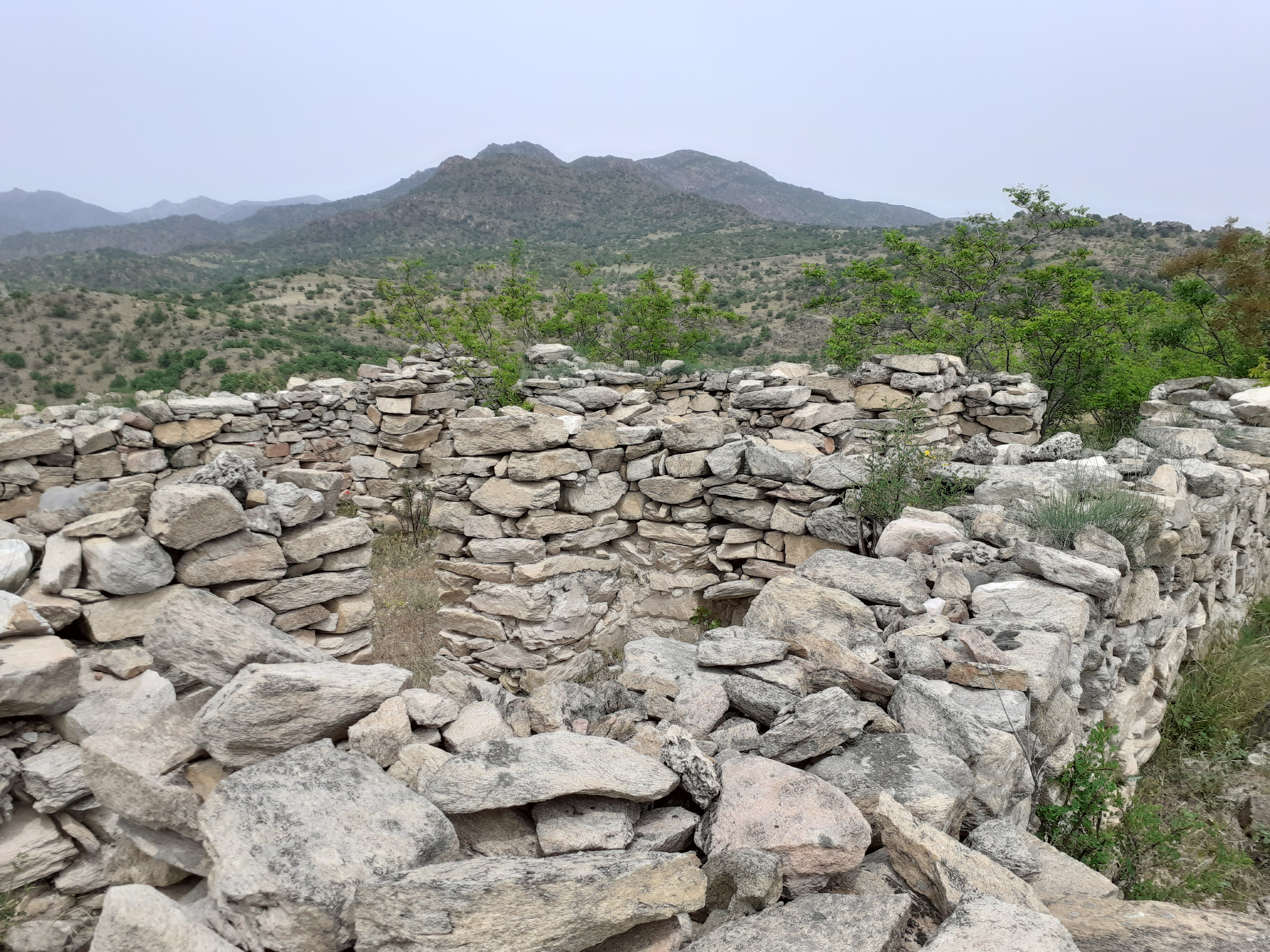
Ruins

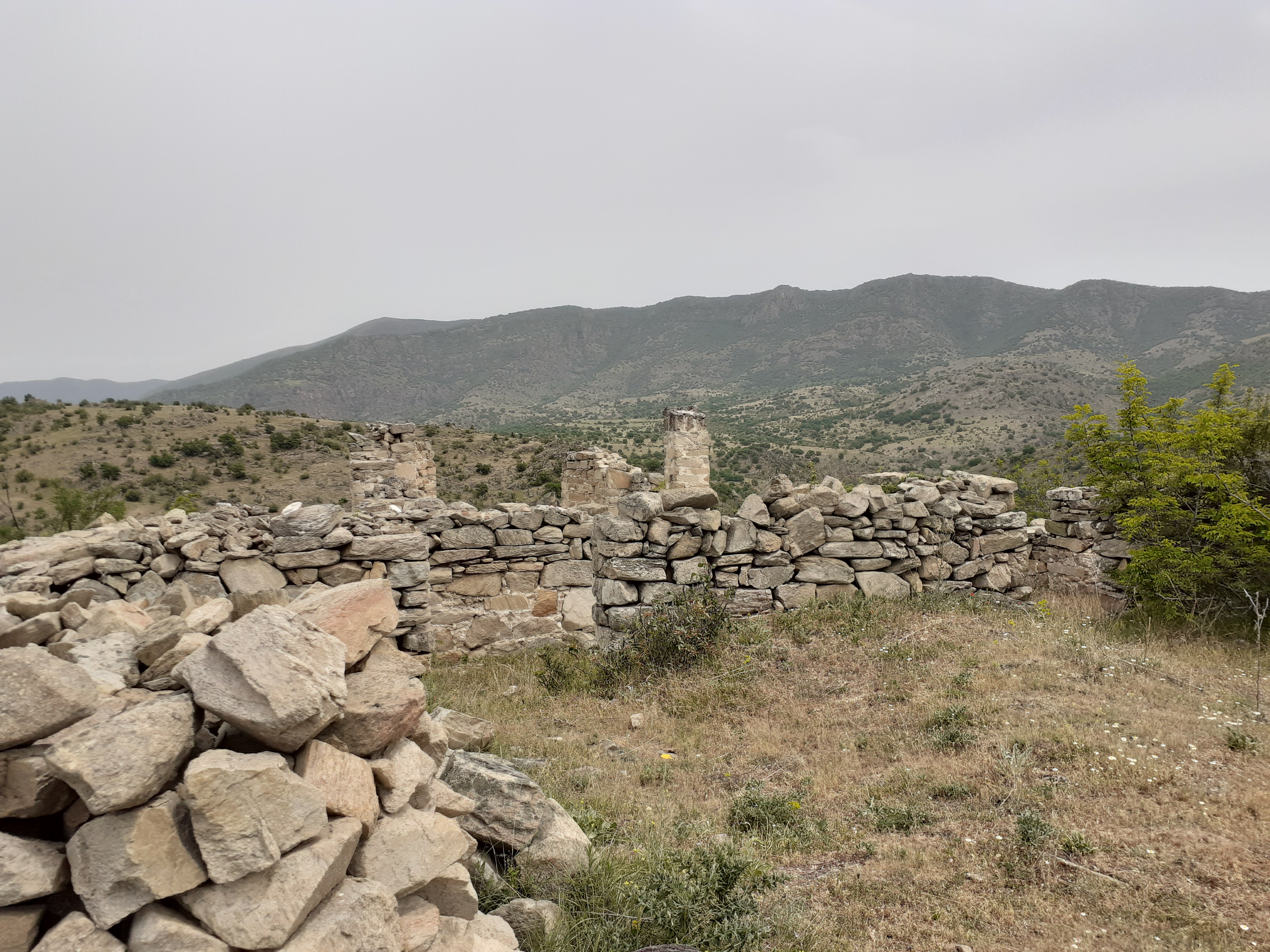
Ruins
