= Tauresium =

Archaeological site in North Macedonia

- Gradište
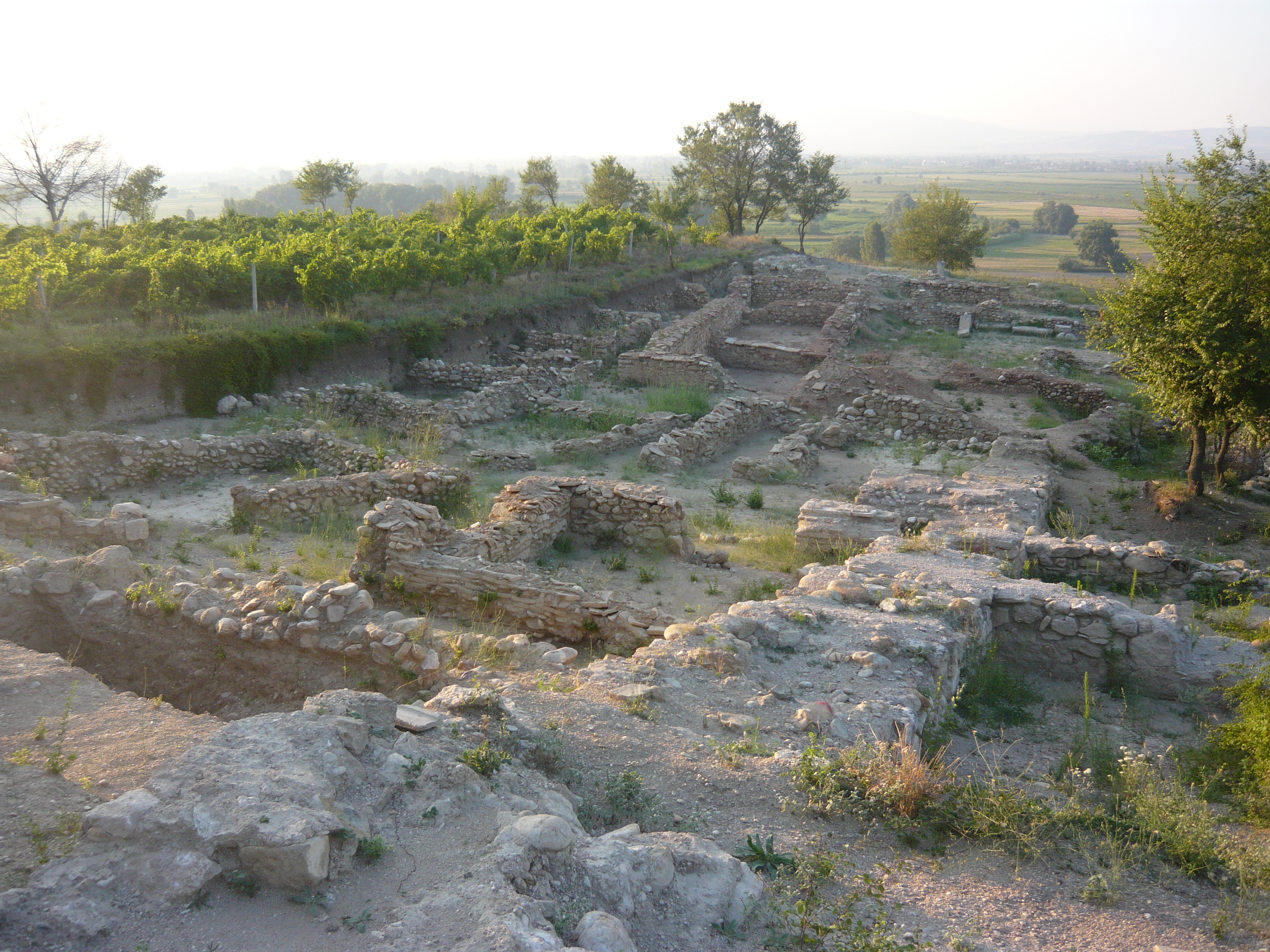
- Remains of building walls in Tauresium

- Location within North Macedonia
- 41°53′53″N 21°36′41″E
- Type: Settlement
- Location: Taor, Skopje Statistical Region, North Macedonia
- Region: Dardania

Site notes
- Archaeologists: Arthur Evans
- Website: www.tauresium.info/english/

Tauresium (Latin: Tauresium; Ancient Greek Ταυρήσιον; Macedonian: Таурезиум), today known as Gradište (Macedonian: Градиште), is an archaeological site in North Macedonia near the village of Taor. Tauresium in Dardania was the birthplace of Byzantine Emperor Justinian I (ca. 482) and King Theodahad of the Ostrogoths (480).

== Location and general characteristics ==
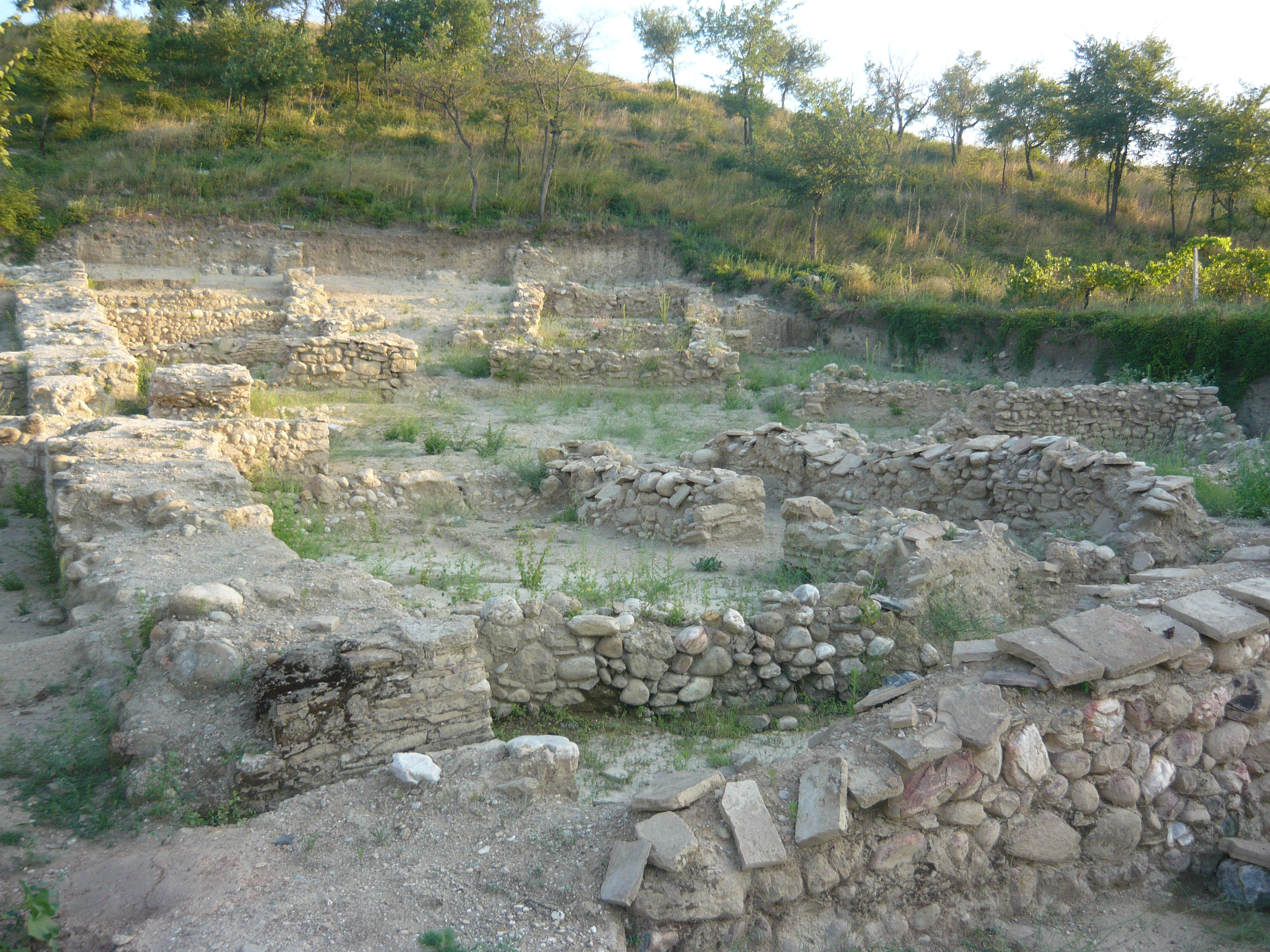
Remains of the ancient town of Tauresium

Tauresium is located in Zelenikovo Municipality, near the village Taor, some 20 kilometres (12 mi) southeast of Skopje. The site was discovered by British archaeologist Arthur Evans in the late 19th century.

In the book De aedificiis, Procopius states:

"...Among the Dardanians of Europe who live beyond the boundaries of the Epidamnians, close to the fortress which is called Bederiana, there was a hamlet named Taurisium, whence sprang the Emperor Justinian, the founder of the civilised world. He therefore built a wall of small compass about this place in the form of a square, placing a tower at each corner, and caused it to be called, as it actually is, Tetrapyrgia. And close by this place he built a very notable city which he named Justiniana Prima (this means "first" in the Latin tongue), thus paying a debt of gratitude to the home that fostered him..."

The similarity in the names of Tauresium and Barderia as Taor (Таор) and Bader (Бадер) was brought to attention by Antun Mihanović, the First Austrian Konzul 1836–1858 and proposed to the writer Hun, who stopped on his journey to investigate the location, which is noted in the book Stara Srbija i Makedonija – Spiridion Gopčević. The stories from the local peasants and the badly damaged Cyrillic script were not sufficient to prove the theory initially, but later, in the Monastery of St. John in Veles, Cyrillic writings were presented to him from which he concluded that this was the same Byzantine city of Tauresium, birthplace of Justinian I, who laid the foundation for The First Golden Age of The Byzantine Empire.

Tauresium and the castle Baderiana were destroyed in an earthquake in 518; the epicenter of the earthquake was in the nearby city of Skupi. As a gesture of gratitude to his birthplace, Justinian I rebuilt the city. According to the excavations that have been done so far, it is estimated that the oldest parts of Tauresium date from the 4th century, and this oldest part is a castle with four towers known as Tetrapirgia. Regarding Baderiana, Procopius states that it "is a settled castle with oddments from the 4th to 6th century". Baderiana or the modern Bader is located 6 kilometres (3.7 mi) east of Tauresium and Taor.

According to another study, Justinian was born in a different Tauresium, a village that was located near the city of Naissus.

== See also ==
- Justin I
- Justiniana Prima
- Illyro-Roman
