= Church of St. John at Kaneo =

Orthodox church in North Macedonia

Coordinates: 41°6′39.91″N 20°47′19.17″E

Saint John at Kaneo
- Свети Јован Канео
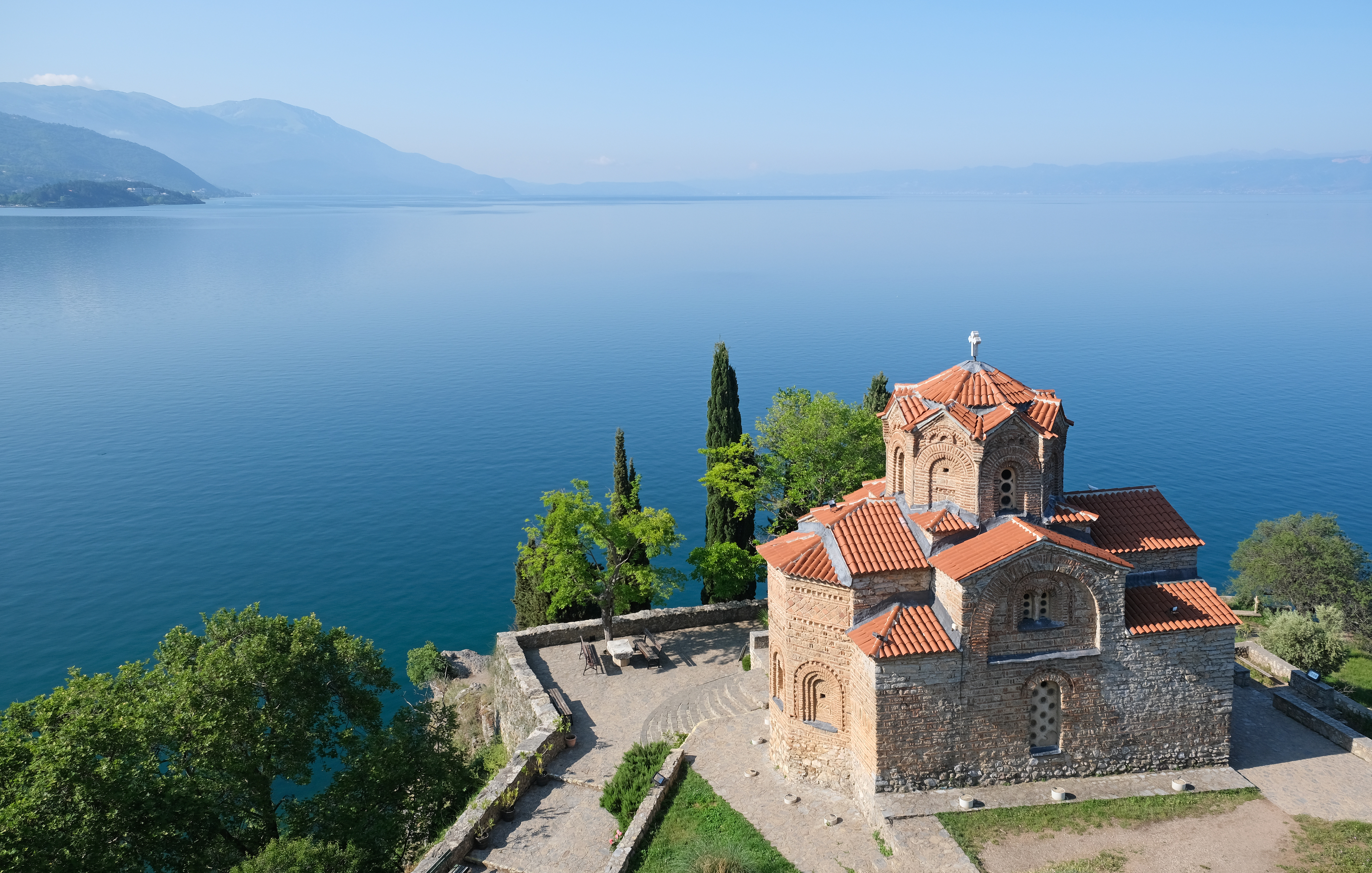
- Church of Saint John of Patmos

Religion
- Affiliation: Macedonian Orthodox Church (Eastern Orthodox Church)
- District: Kaneo
- Year consecrated: ca. 13th century

Location
- Location: Ohrid, Republic of North Macedonia
- Interactive map of Saint John at Kaneo

Architecture
- Type: Middle-Byzantine
- Style: Byzantine style

Saint John the Theologian, Kaneo (Macedonian: Свети Јован Канео, Latinic: Sveti Jovan Kaneo) or simply Saint John at Kaneo is a Macedonian Orthodox church situated on the cliff over Kaneo Beach overlooking Lake Ohrid in the city of Ohrid, North Macedonia. The church is dedicated to John of Patmos, the writer of Revelation, who has been by some considered to be the same person as John the Apostle. The construction date of the church remains unknown but documents detailing the church property suggest that it was built before the year 1447. Archaeologists believe that the church was constructed some time before the rise of the Ottoman Empire very likely in the 13th century. Restoration work in 1964 led to the discovery of frescoes in its dome.

== History ==
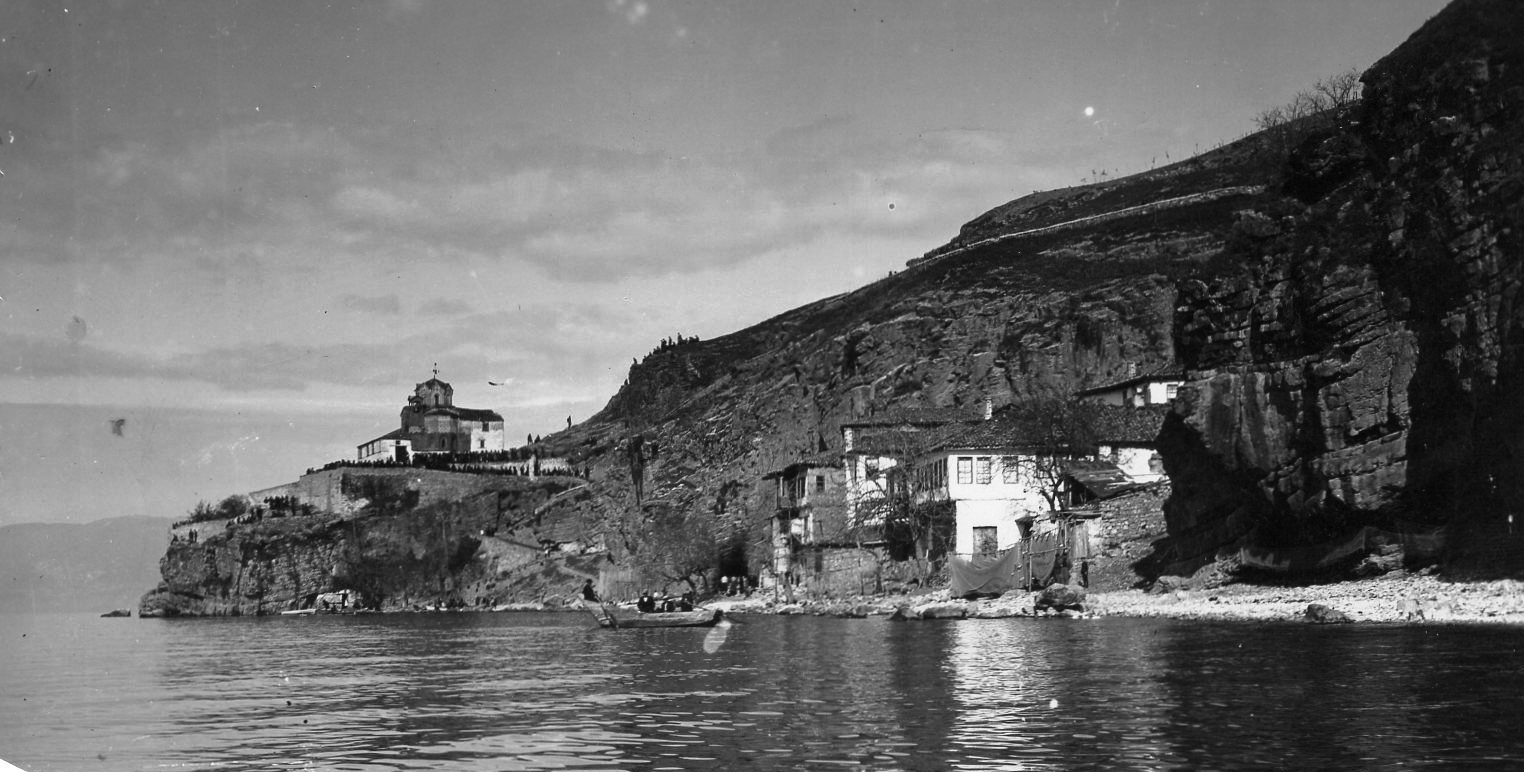
Postcard of Ohrid, Church of St. John at Kaneo from 1930's.

The church has a cruciform architectural plan, with a rectangular base. The architect of the church is unknown. Reconstruction work was carried out on the church in the 14th century, shortly before the arrival of Ottoman Turks in Macedonia. A wooden iconostasis was constructed within the church and by the 20th century numerous saints along with the Virgin Mary have been portrayed on the apse. A fresco of Christ Pantocrator can be seen on the dome of the church. A fresco of Saint Clement of Ohrid (whose monastery, Saint Panteleimon, is located close to the church) accompanied by Saint Erasmus of Ohrid can also be seen on a wall of the church.

== Gallery ==
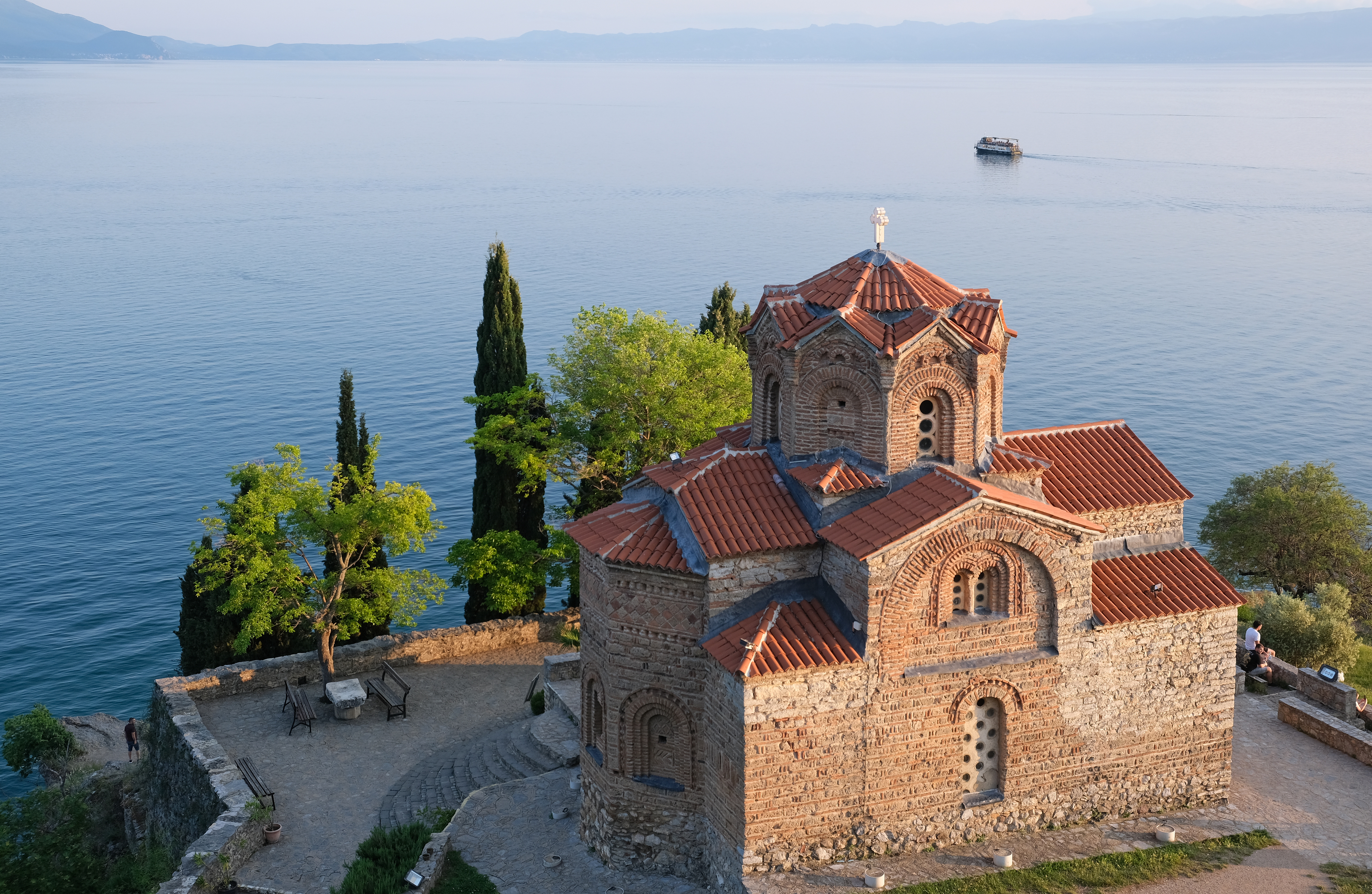
Church of St. John at Kaneo from the above

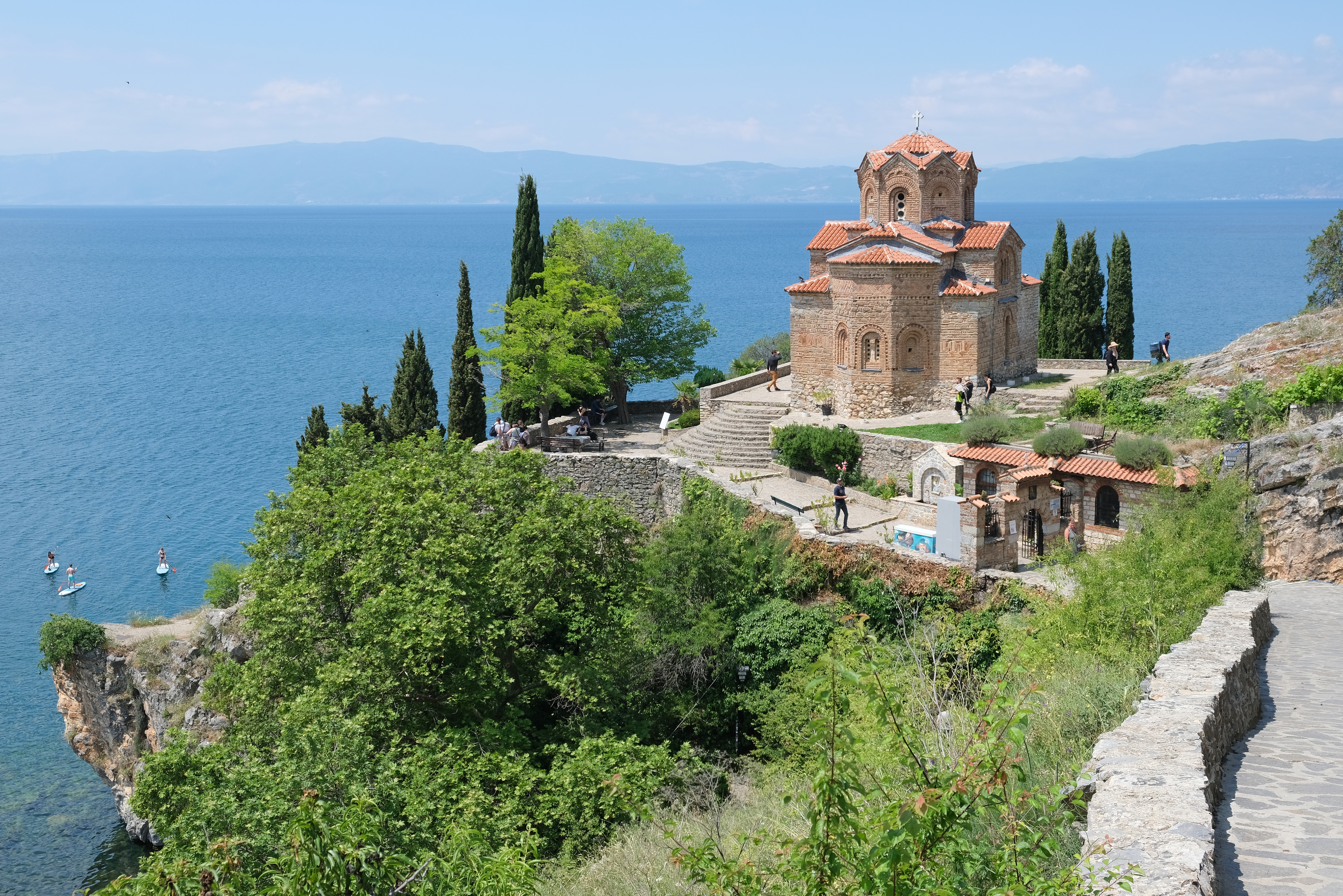
Church of Saint John the Theologian at Kaneo on the cliff

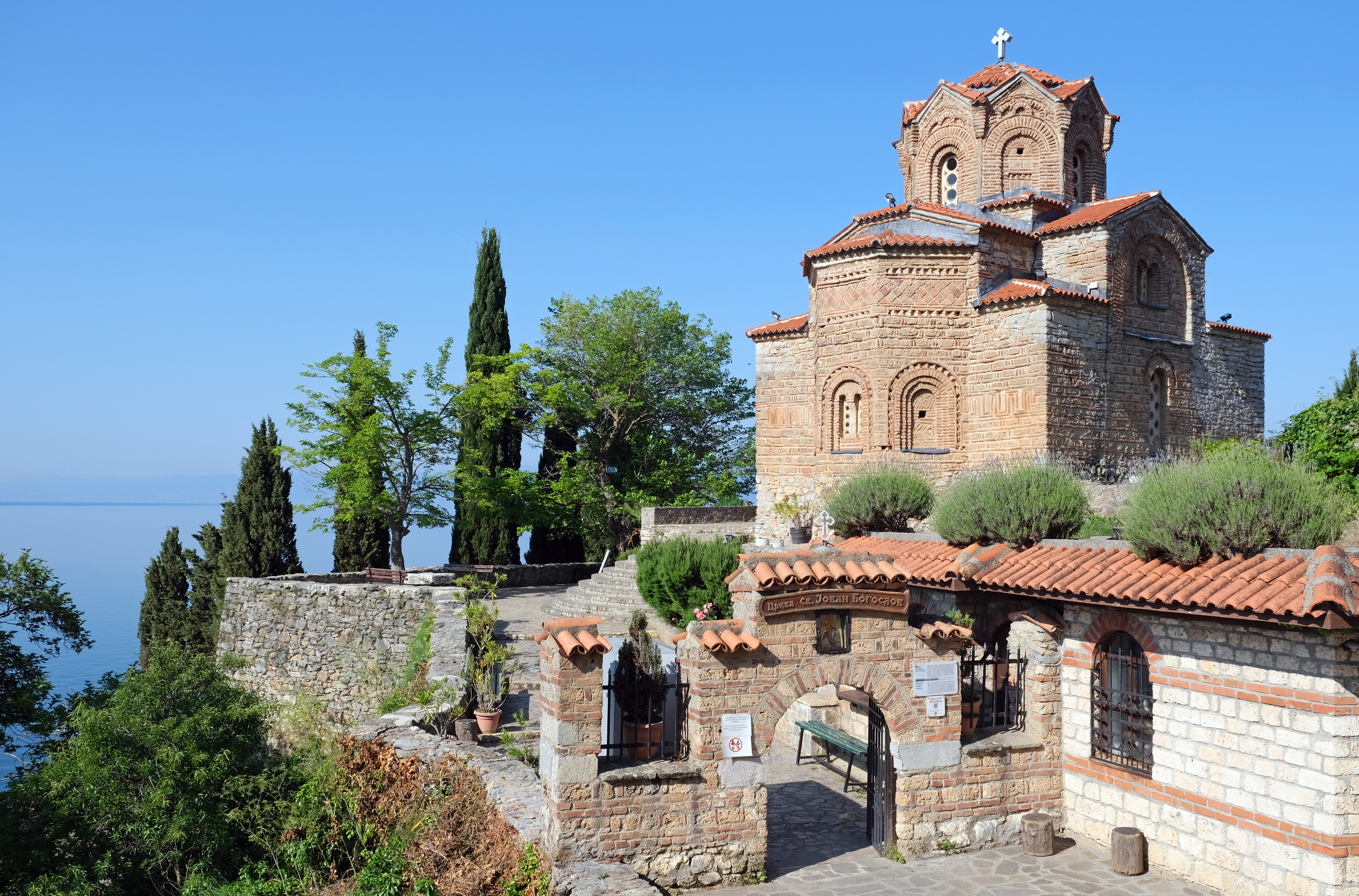
View of the church from the base
