= Taor =

Taor Таор
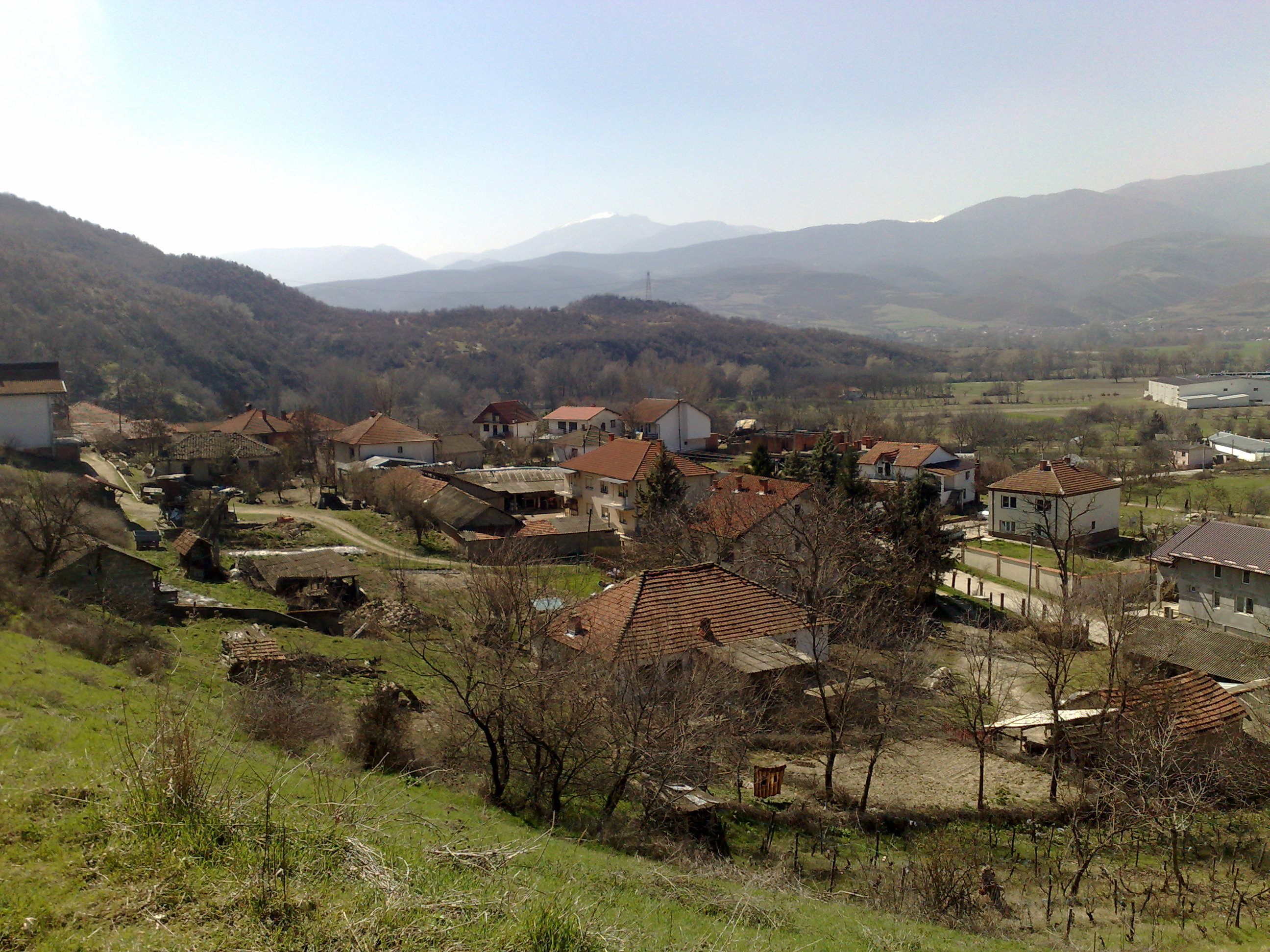

- Location within North Macedonia
- Coordinates: 41°53′53″N 21°36′41″E
- Country: North Macedonia
- Region: Skopje
- Municipality: Zelenikovo

Population (2002)
  - Total: 152
- Time zone: UTC+1 (CET)
  - Summer (DST): UTC+2 (CEST)
- Car plates: SK

Taor (Macedonian: Таор) is a village in North Macedonia. Administratively, Taor is in Zelenikovo Municipality and it is located some 20 km south-east of Skopje. Taor is on the left bank of the Vardar River.

== Etymology ==
The etymology of the village's name Taor derives possibly from the ancient name Tauresium, an ancient town and modern archaeological site near the village.

== Demographics ==
According to the 2002 census, in Taor lived 152 people, all Macedonians.

== See also ==
- Tauresium
- Justinian I
