= Alcomenae =

- Ἀλκομεναί (Ancient Greek)
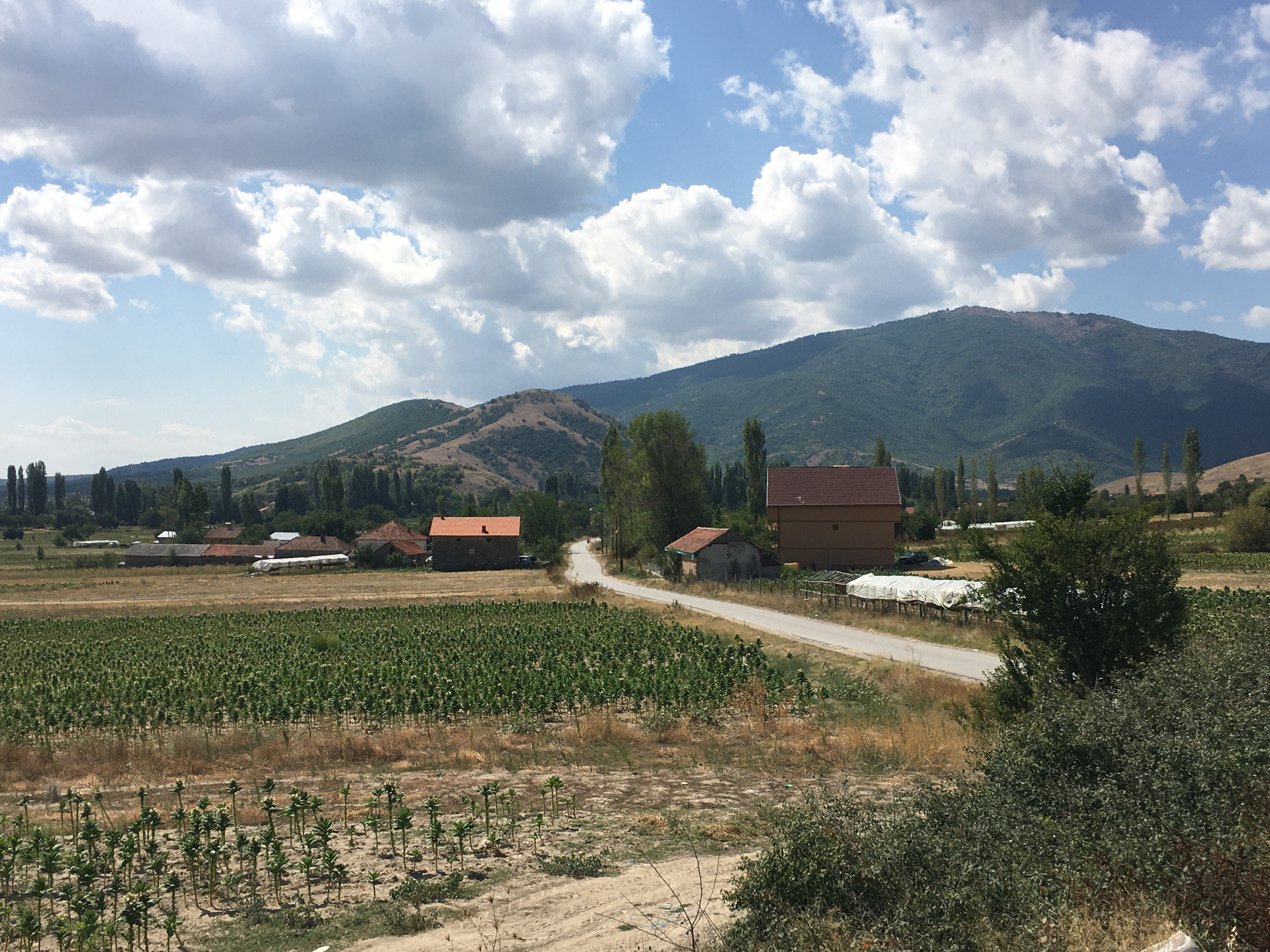
- Picture of the modern village of Buchin, North Macedonia. The historical site/landmark of Alcomenae is located here.
- Interactive map of Alcomenae
- 41°16′33″N 21°18′54″E

Alcomenae or Alkomenai (Ancient Greek: Ἀλκομεναί), also Alcomena or Alkomena (Ἀλκομενα), or Alalcomenae or Alalkomenai (Ancient Greek: Ἀλαλκομ́εναι), was a town of the Deuriopes on the Erigon, in the Pelagonia Region in Ancient Macedonia.

Its site is located in the modern village of Bučin in North Macedonia.
