= Bargala =

Archaeological site in Karbinci Municipality, North Macedonia

Coordinates: 41°47′55″N 22°17′24″E

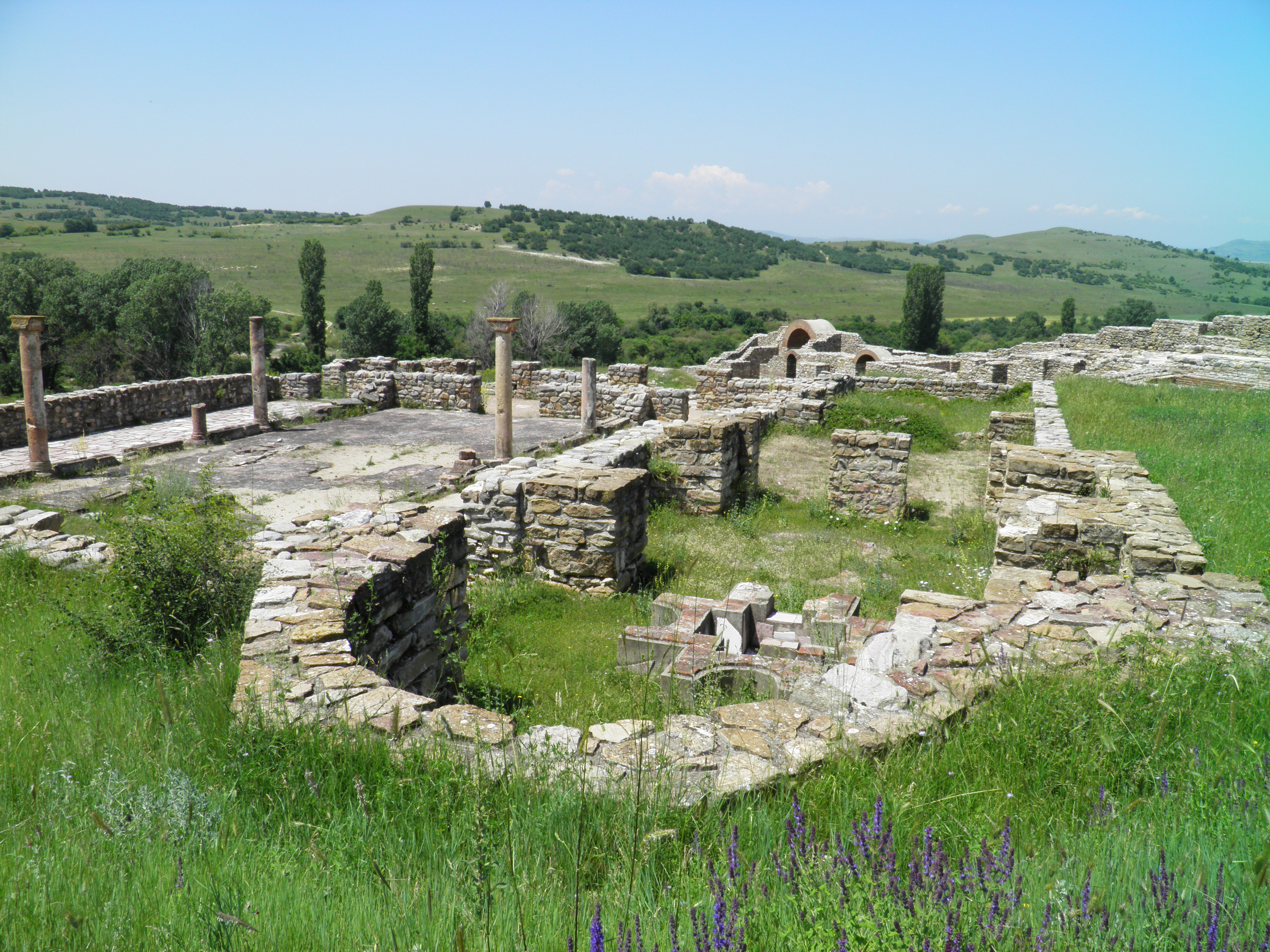
Bargala site overview

Bargala (Macedonian: Баргала) is an archaeological site in Karbinci Municipality, North Macedonia, 15.5 km (9.6 mi) east of the city of Štip. It is situated in a river valley on the lower slope of the north side of Plačkovica Mountain. The site's name is of Thracian origin. An inscription at the site states that the city gate was constructed in 371/372 AD. An important religious and cultural centre of the middle Bregalnica region, Bargala was a city in the Roman province of Macedonia Secunda. In the 4th and 5th centuries, the prosperous city was the seat of a bishopric with a basilica complex at its centre and four more basilicas located outside the city wall. The bishopric of Bargala existed until the end of the 6th century AD.

Gold coins of Emperor Phokas (602-610) are discovered at the locality, as well as 6th and 7th century Slavic pottery. Coins found from the 580s provide an approximate date of the abandonment of Bargala and the arrival of the Slavs.

Archaeological excavations began in 1966, uncovering the trapezoidal fortified site and ruins of its seven towers and two gates.
