= Bonče =

Bonče / Bonche Бонче
- Village
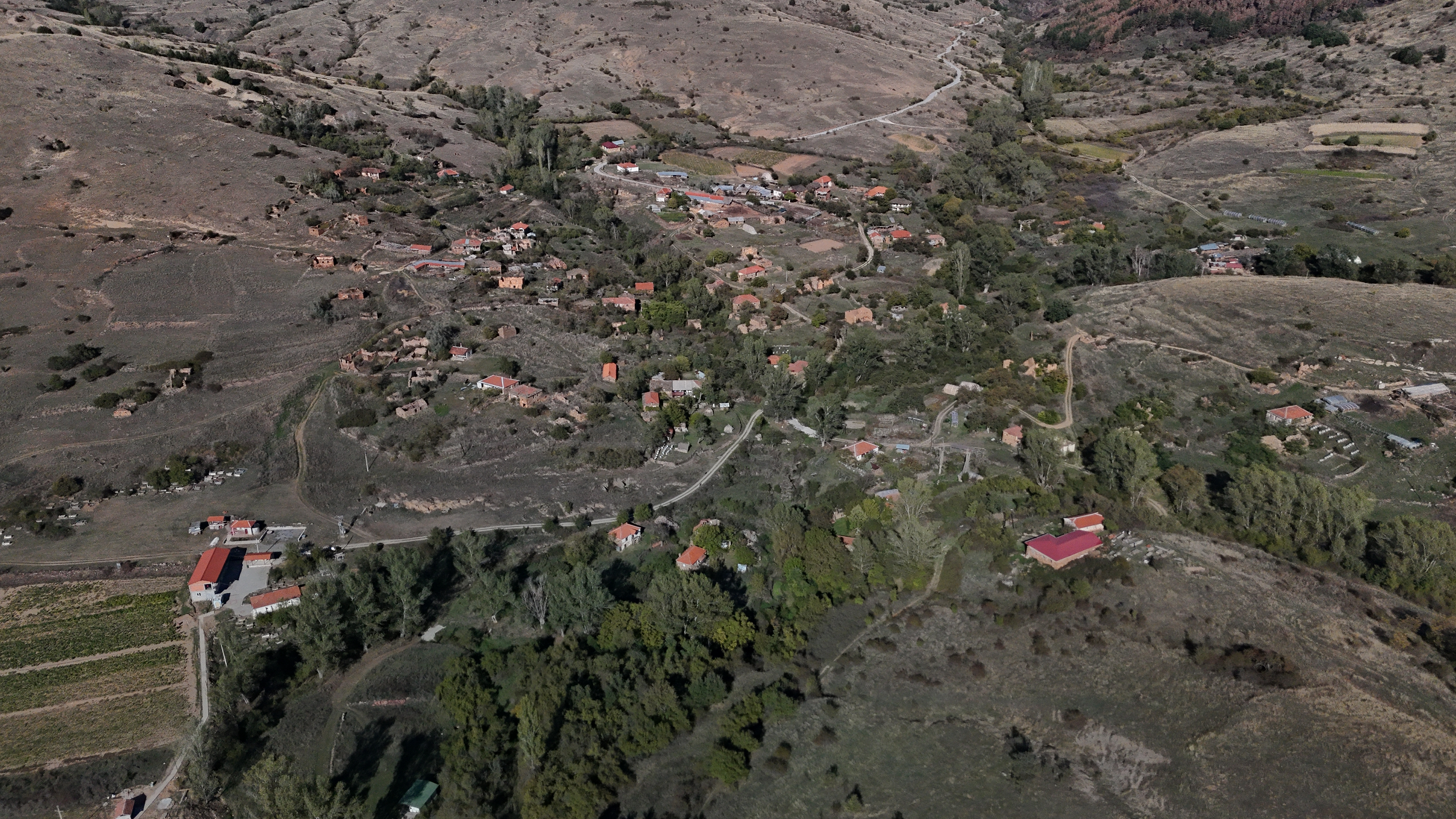
- Air view of Bonče

- Location within North Macedonia
- Country: North Macedonia
- Region: Pelagonia
- Municipality: Prilep
- Elevation: 988 m (3,241 ft)

Population (2021)
  - Total: 22
- Time zone: UTC+1 (CET)
- Postal code: 7512
- Area code: +38948

Bonče (Бонче) is a village in the Prilep municipality, in North Macedonia. It used to be part of the former municipality of Topolčani.

In September 2007 archeological excavations revealed a tomb of what is believed to be the burial site of a Macedonian ruler dating 4th century BC. Fragmented ancient Macedonian shields were discovered carrying the inscription of the "ruler Demetrius".

== Gallery ==
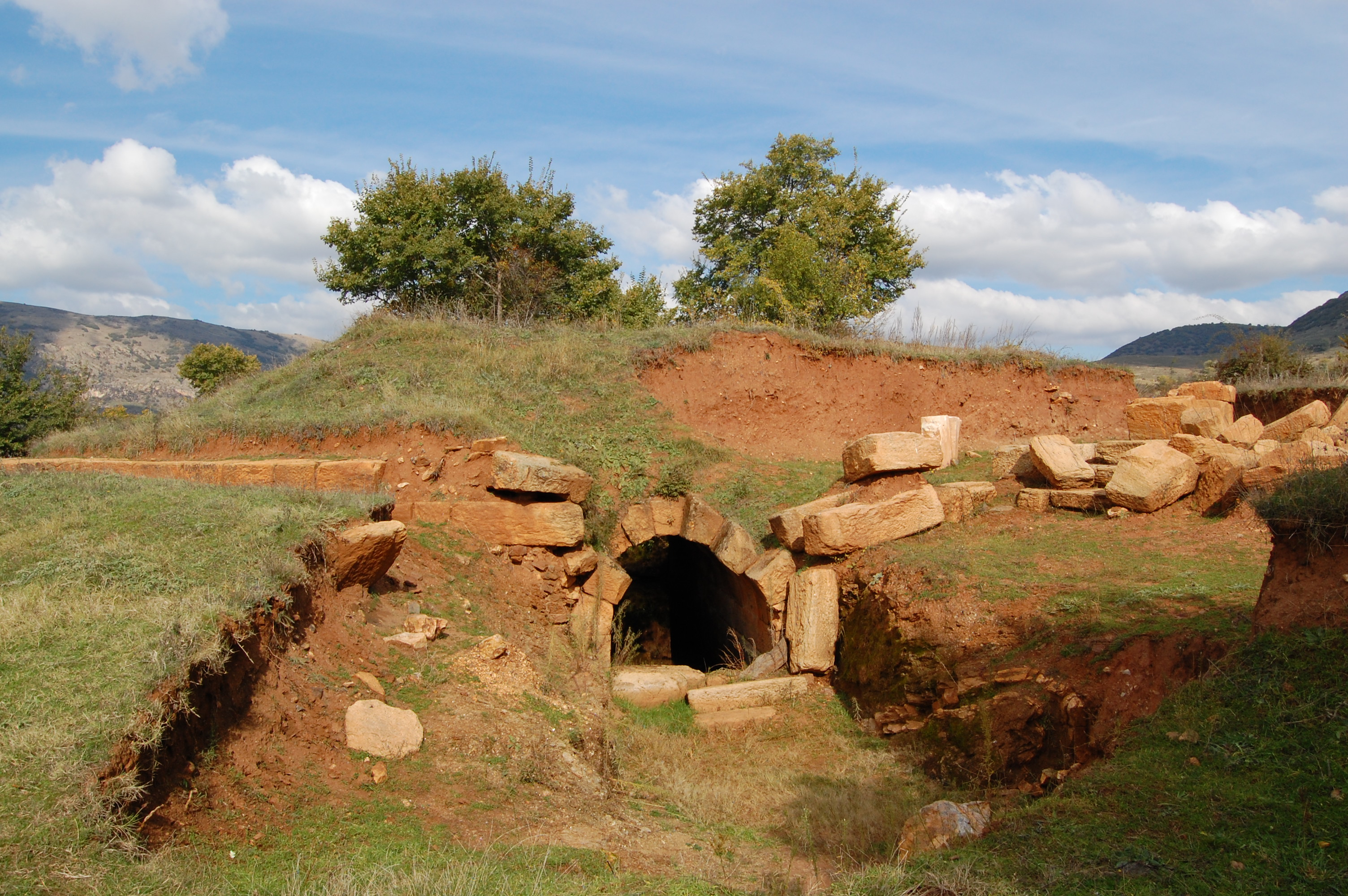
Entrance to the tomb

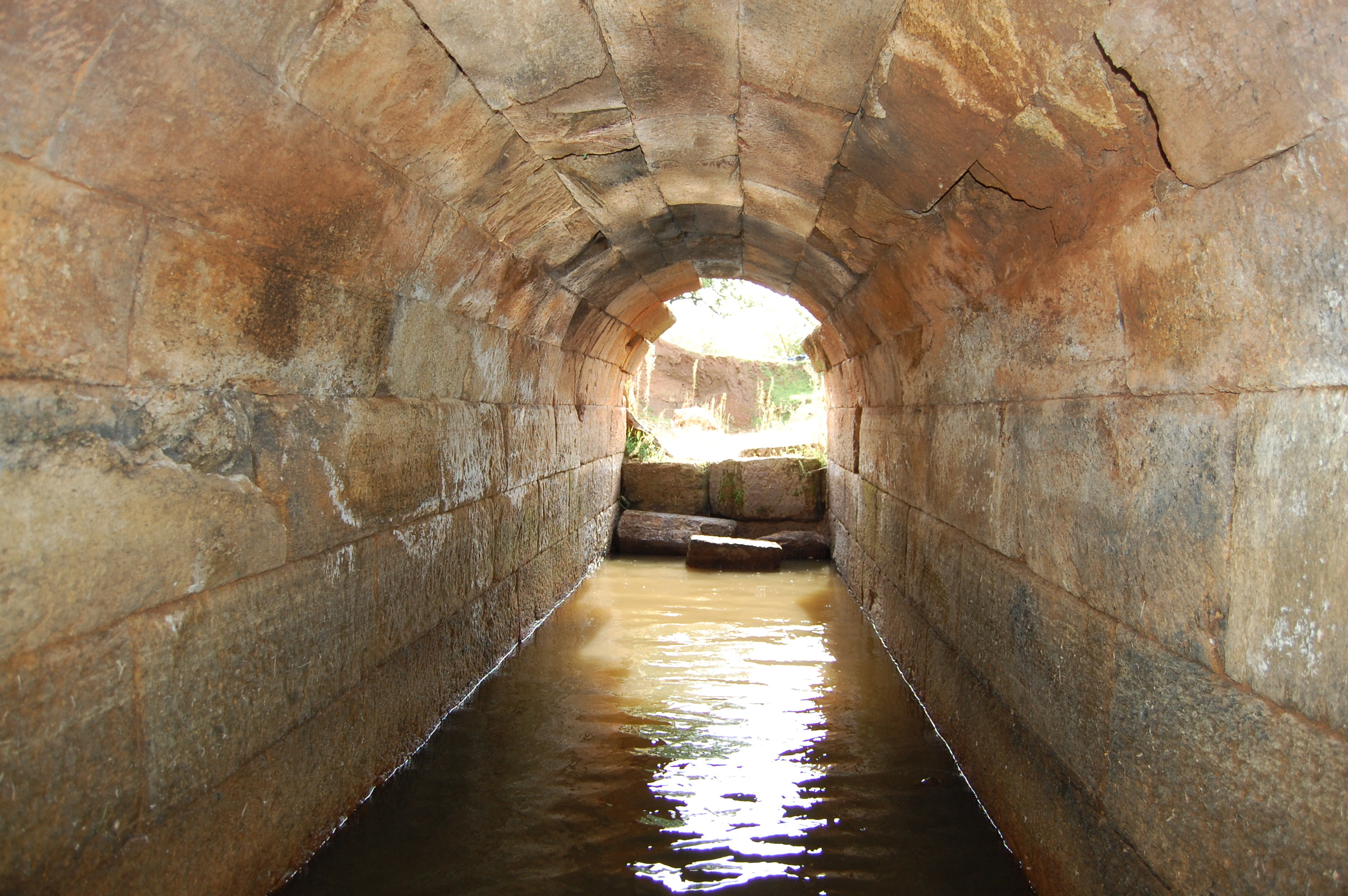
Dromos leading to a chamber

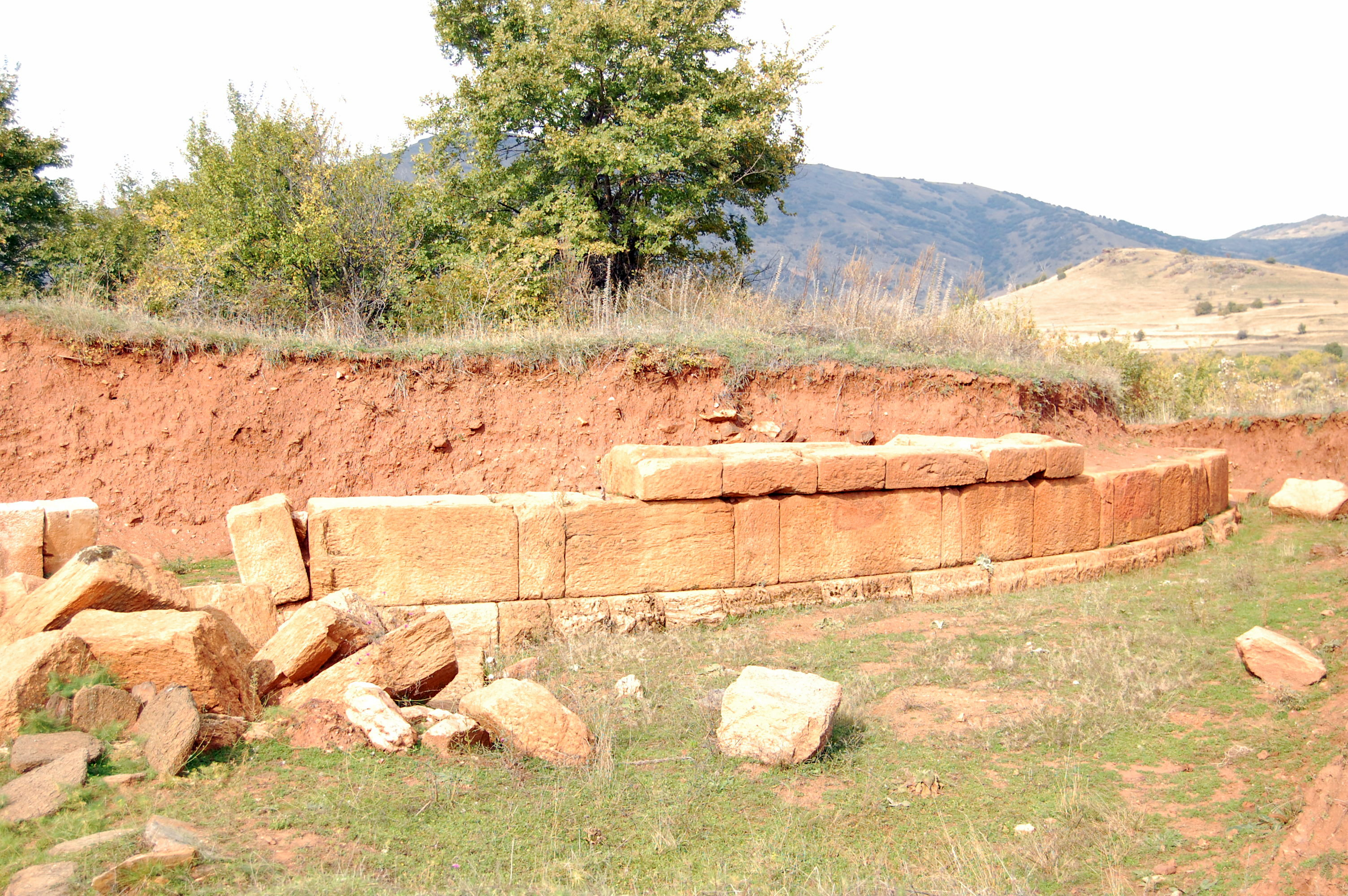
Eastern part of the circular wall

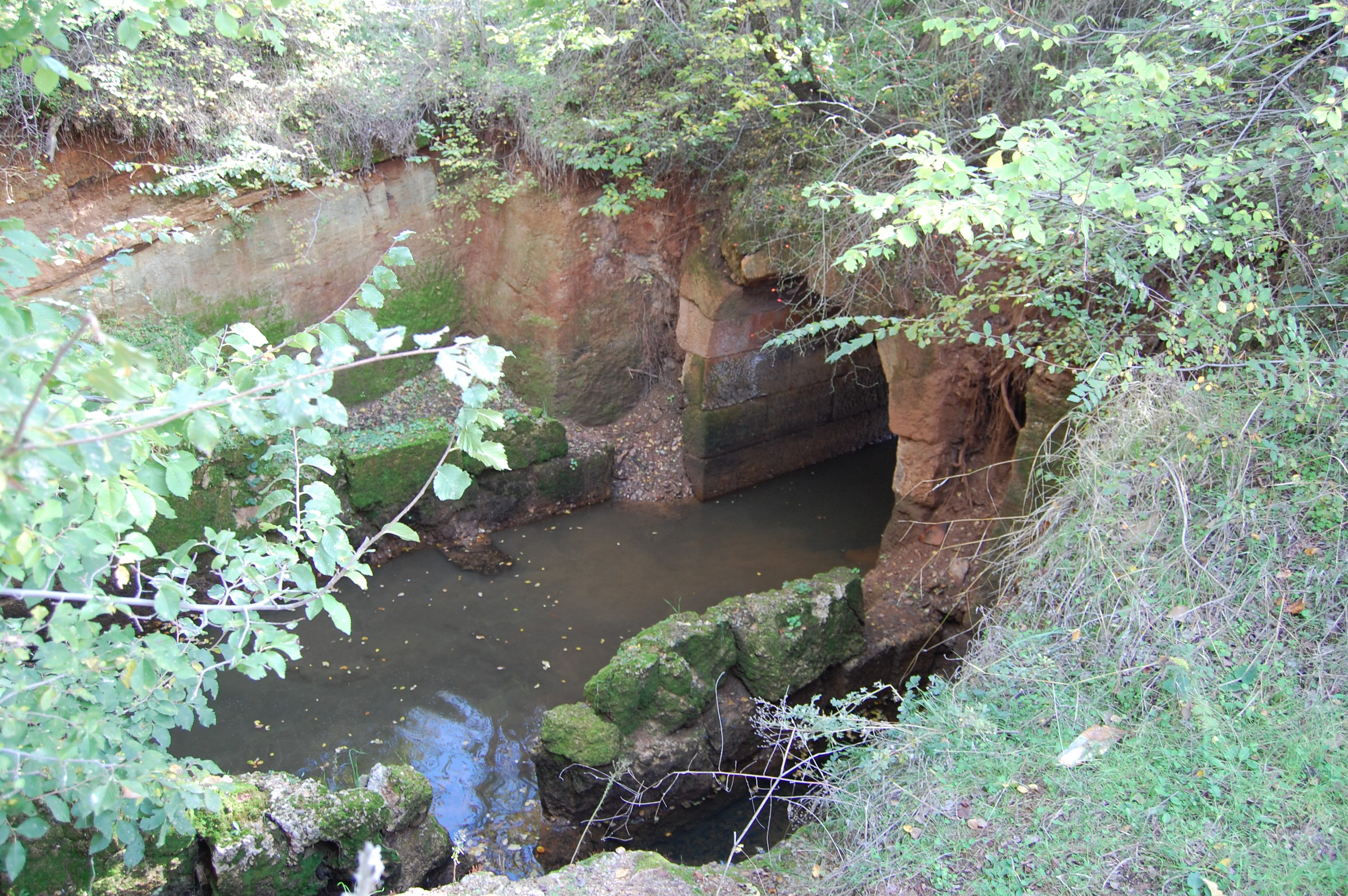
The chamber of the tomb

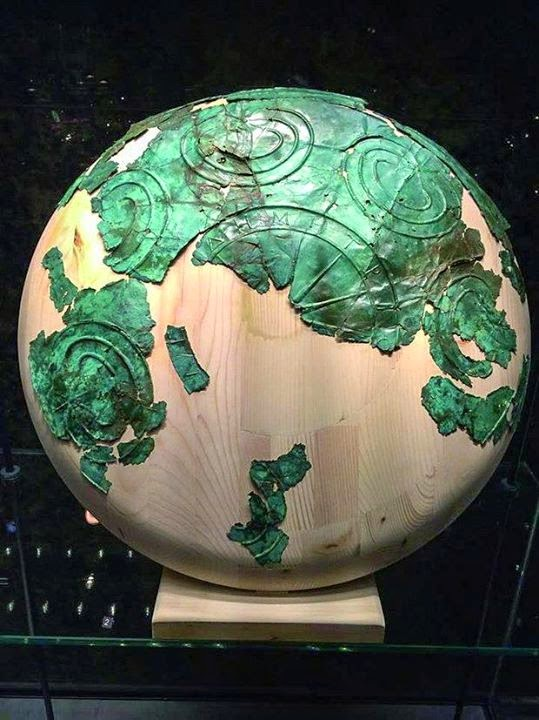
Fragments of an ancient Macedonian shield found in Bonče
