= Samuel's Fortress, Ohrid =

Fortress in the old town of Ohrid, North Macedonia

Samuel's Fortress
- Ohrid, North Macedonia
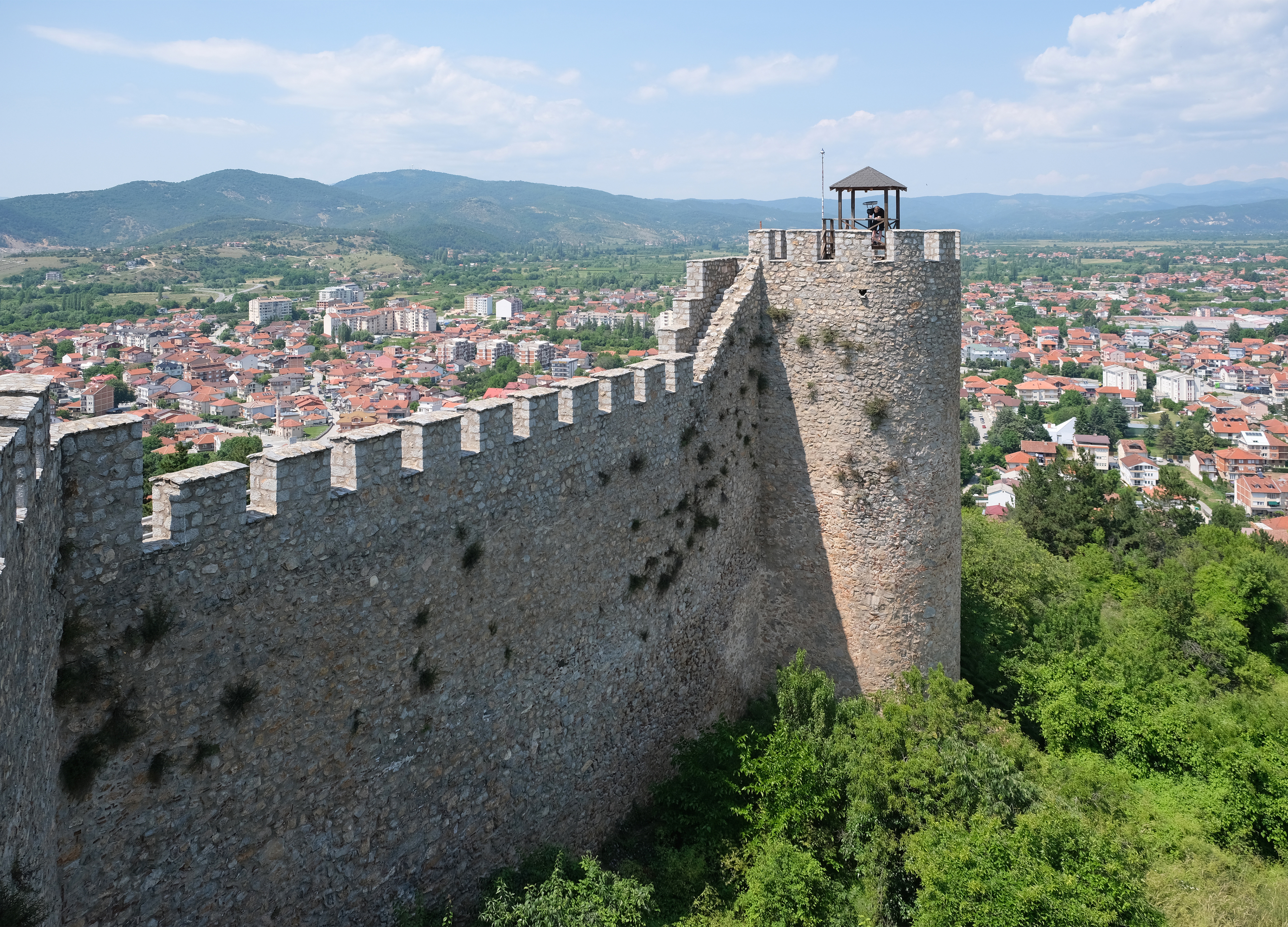
- The fortress of Tsar Samuel

Site information
- Type: Castle
- Open to the public: Yes

Location
- Location within North Macedonia
- Coordinates: 41.115°N 20.791°E

Site history
- Built: 4th century B.C.
- Built by: Original ruins: Philip II of Macedon; Current fortress: Tsar Samuil
- Materials: Limestone

Samuel's Fortress (Macedonian: Самуилова тврдина, romanized: Samuilova tvrdina, Bulgarian: Самуилова крепост, romanized: Samuilova krepost) is a fortress in the old town of Ohrid, North Macedonia. It was the capital of the First Bulgarian Empire during the rule of Tsar Samuel at the turn of the 11th century. Today, this historical monument is a major tourist attraction and was heavily restored in 2003 with the addition of entirely new battlements where none had survived.

According to recent excavations by Macedonian archaeologists, it was contended that this fortress was built on the place of an earlier fortification, dated to the 4th century BC, which was probably built by King Philip II of Macedon. During the late 900s, King Samuil of Bulgaria restored the fortress by rebuilding it into a medieval style stronghold which still stands as is today.

== Gallery ==
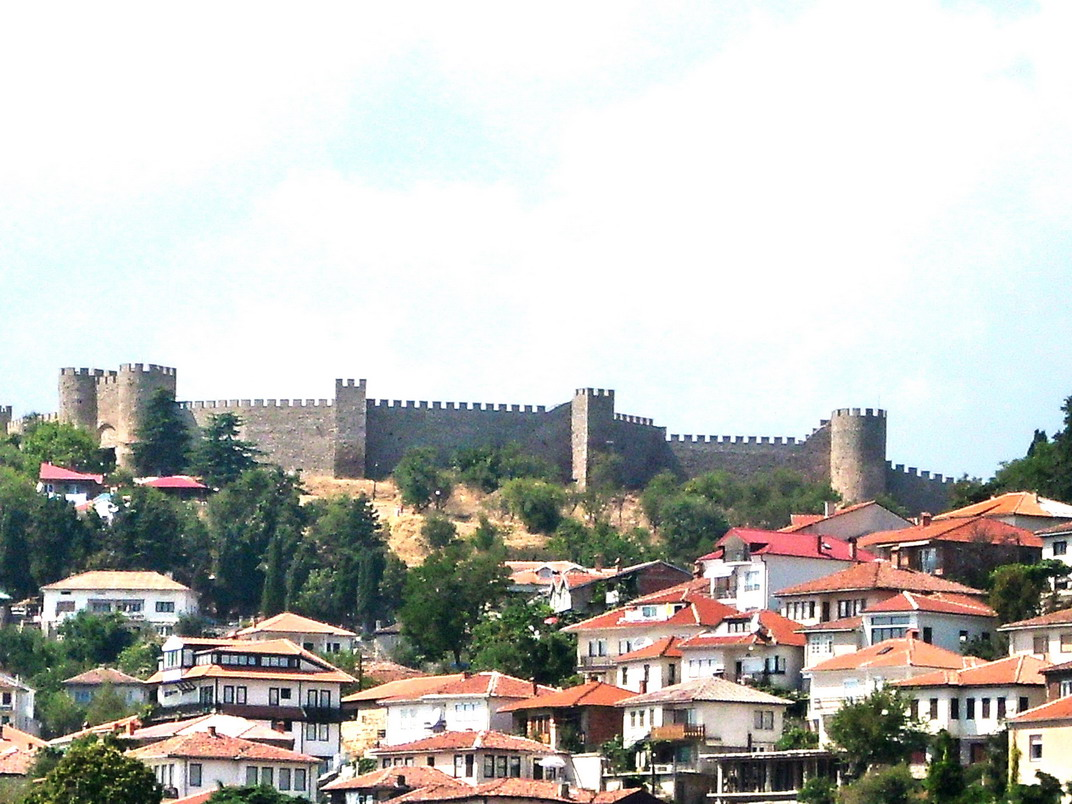
Samuil's Fortress over the old town in Ohrid

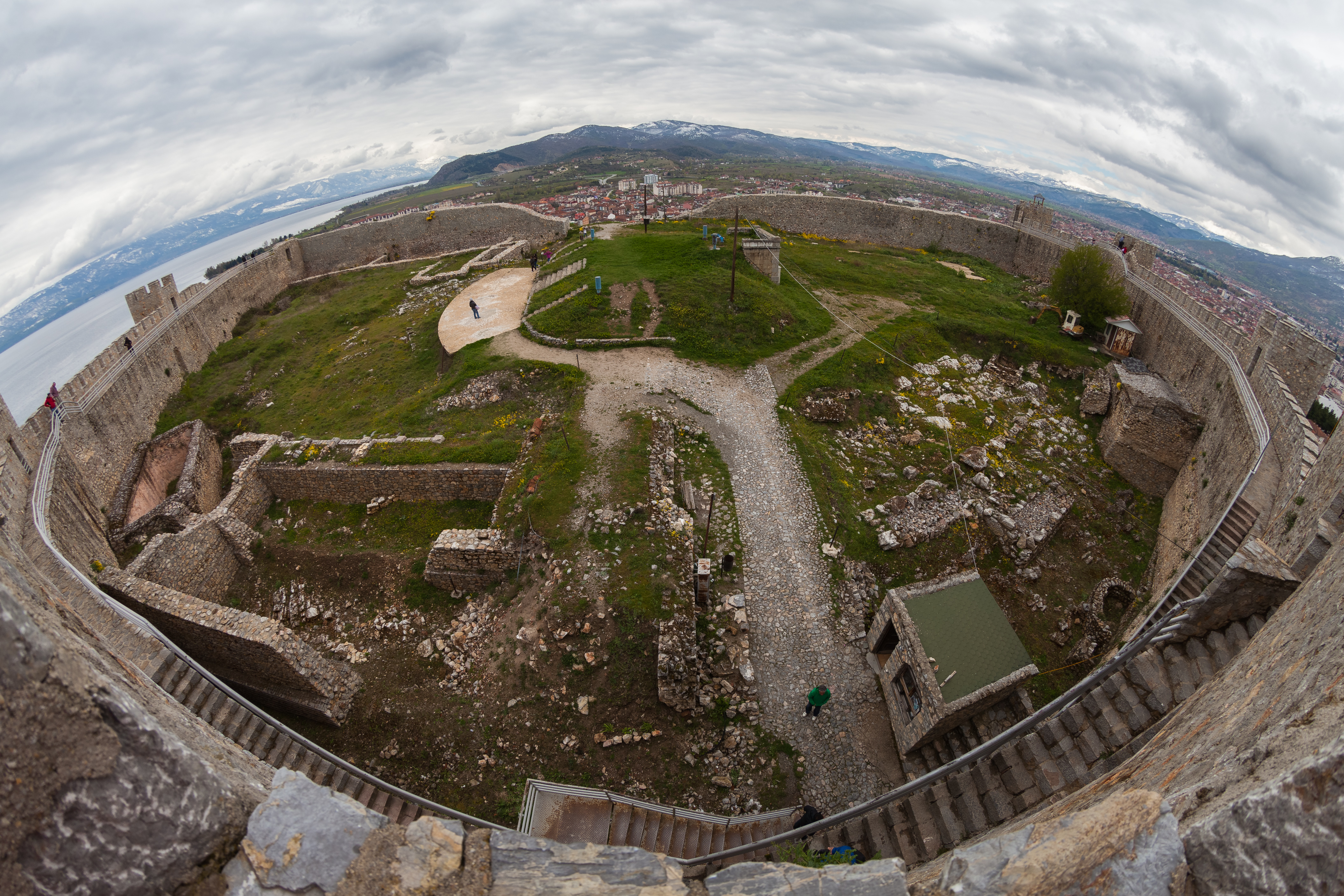
Interior of the fortress

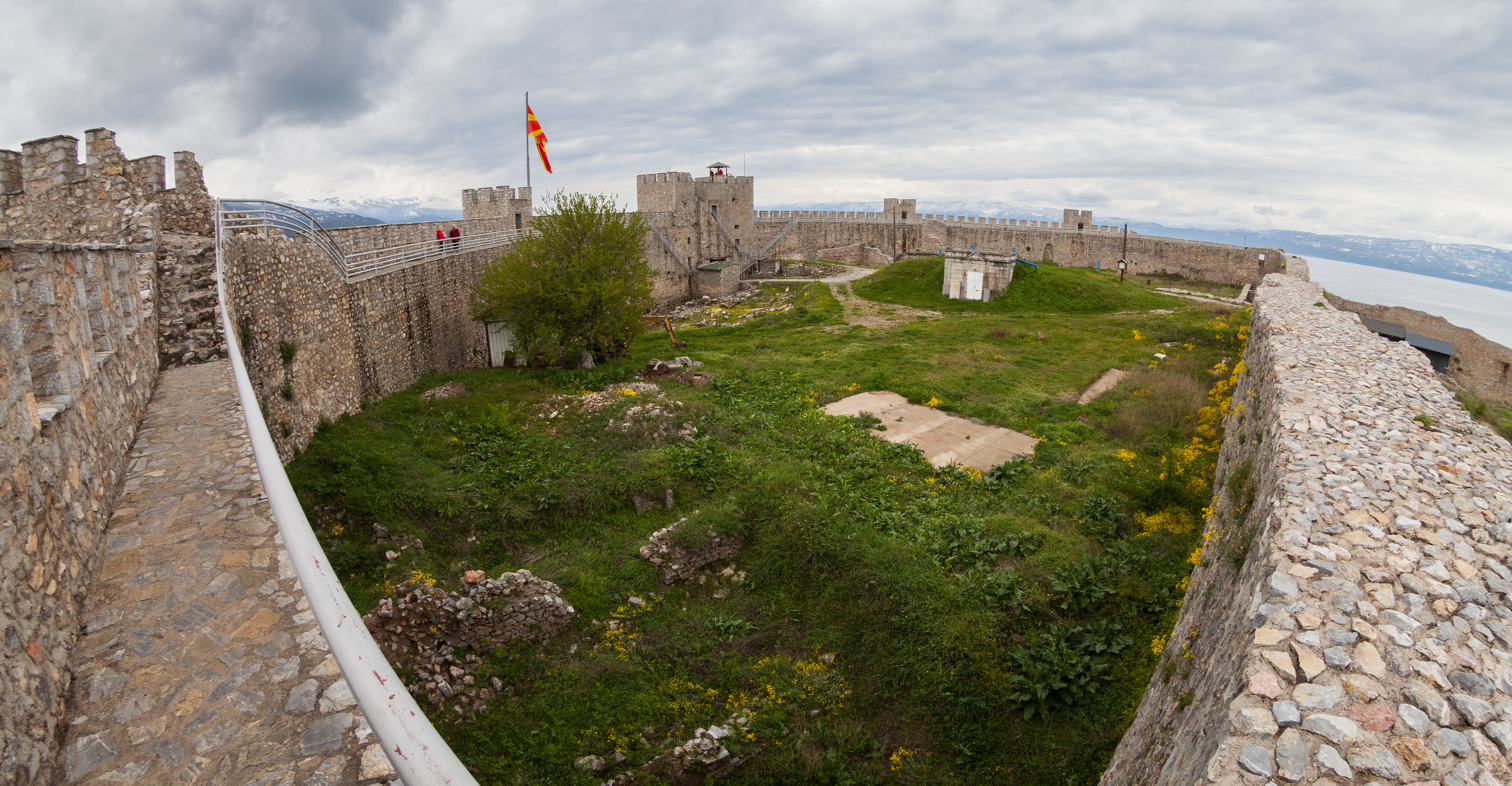
Interior of the fortress

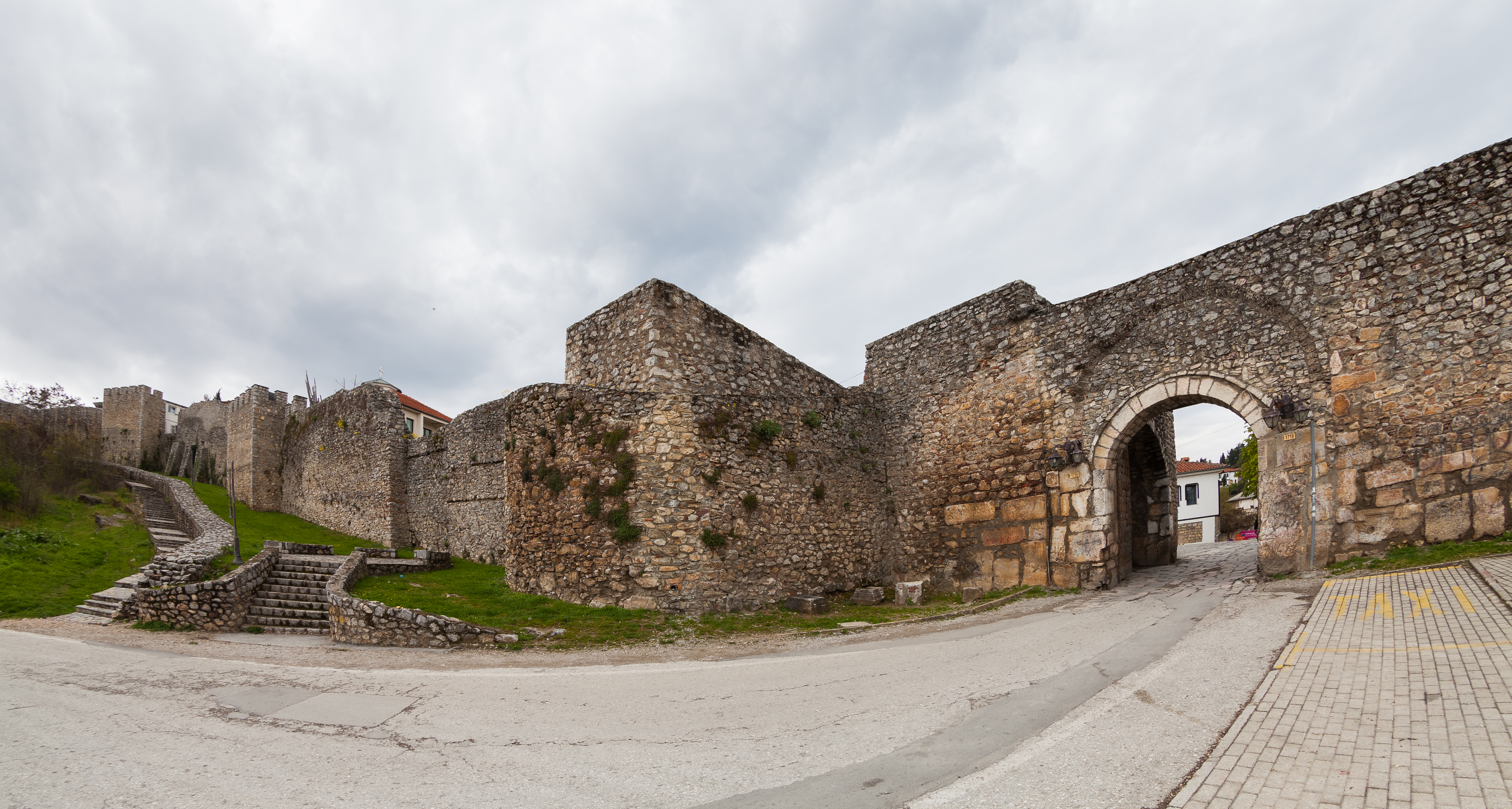
Upper Gate of the fortress

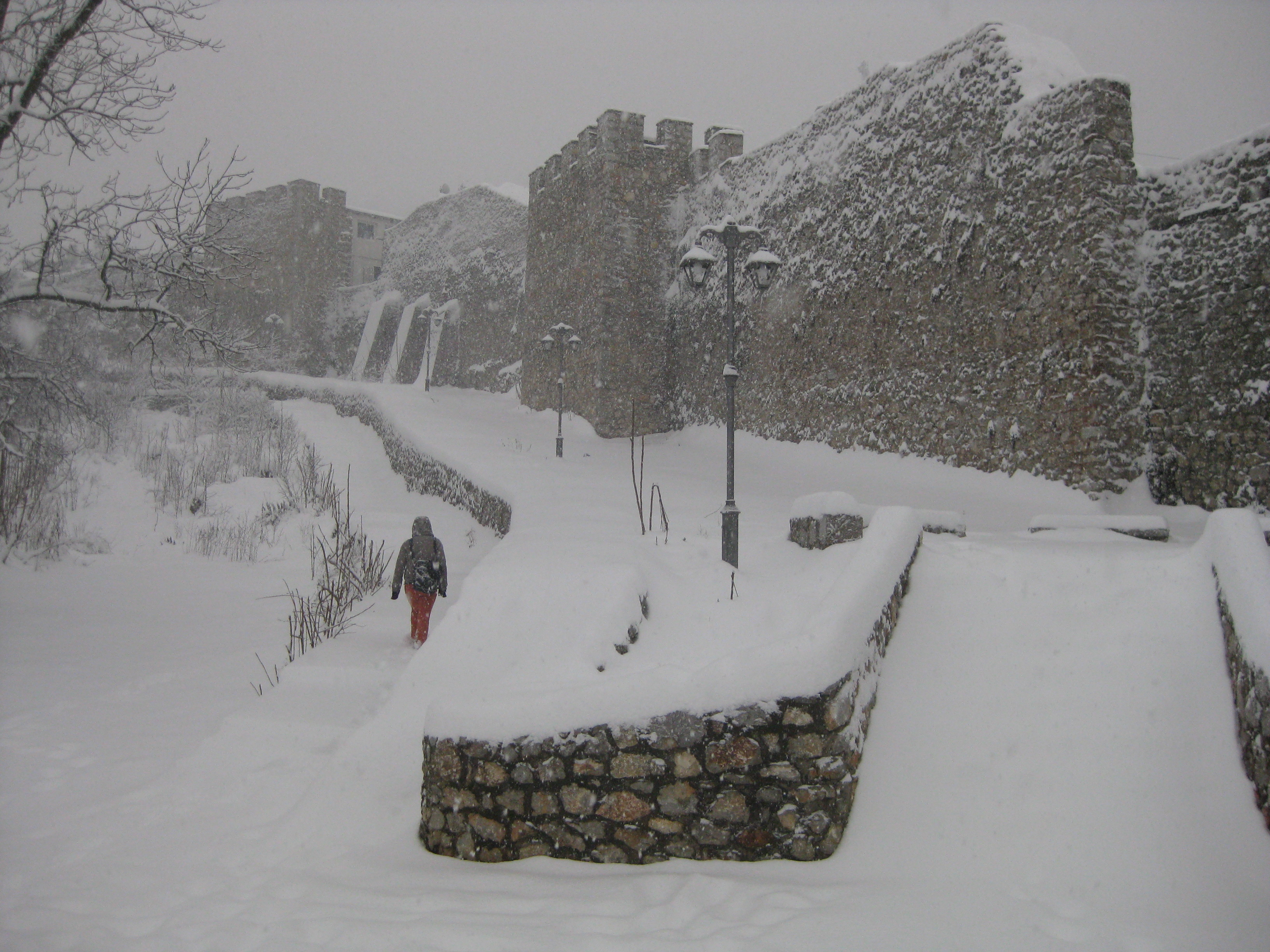
Fortress wall in the winter

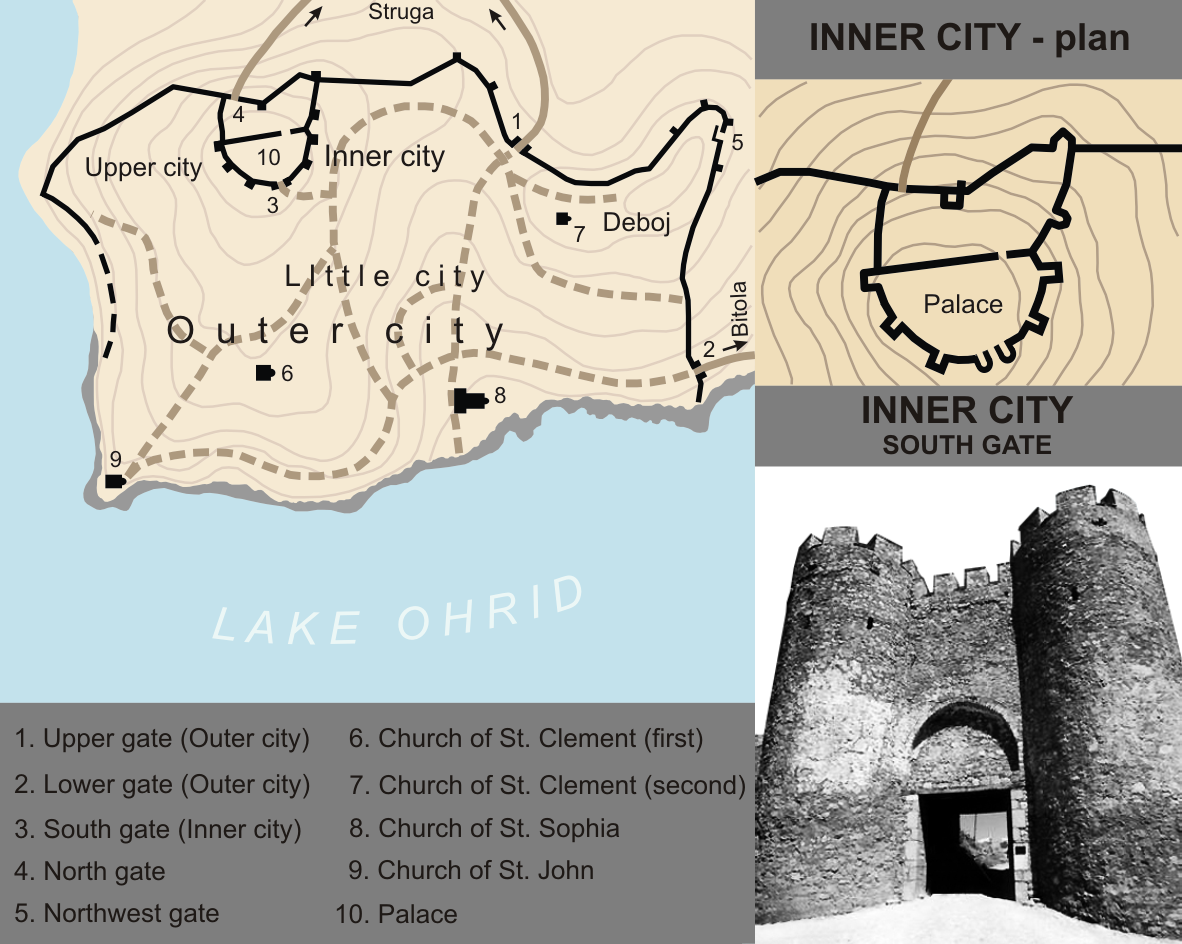
Map of Samuil's Fortress

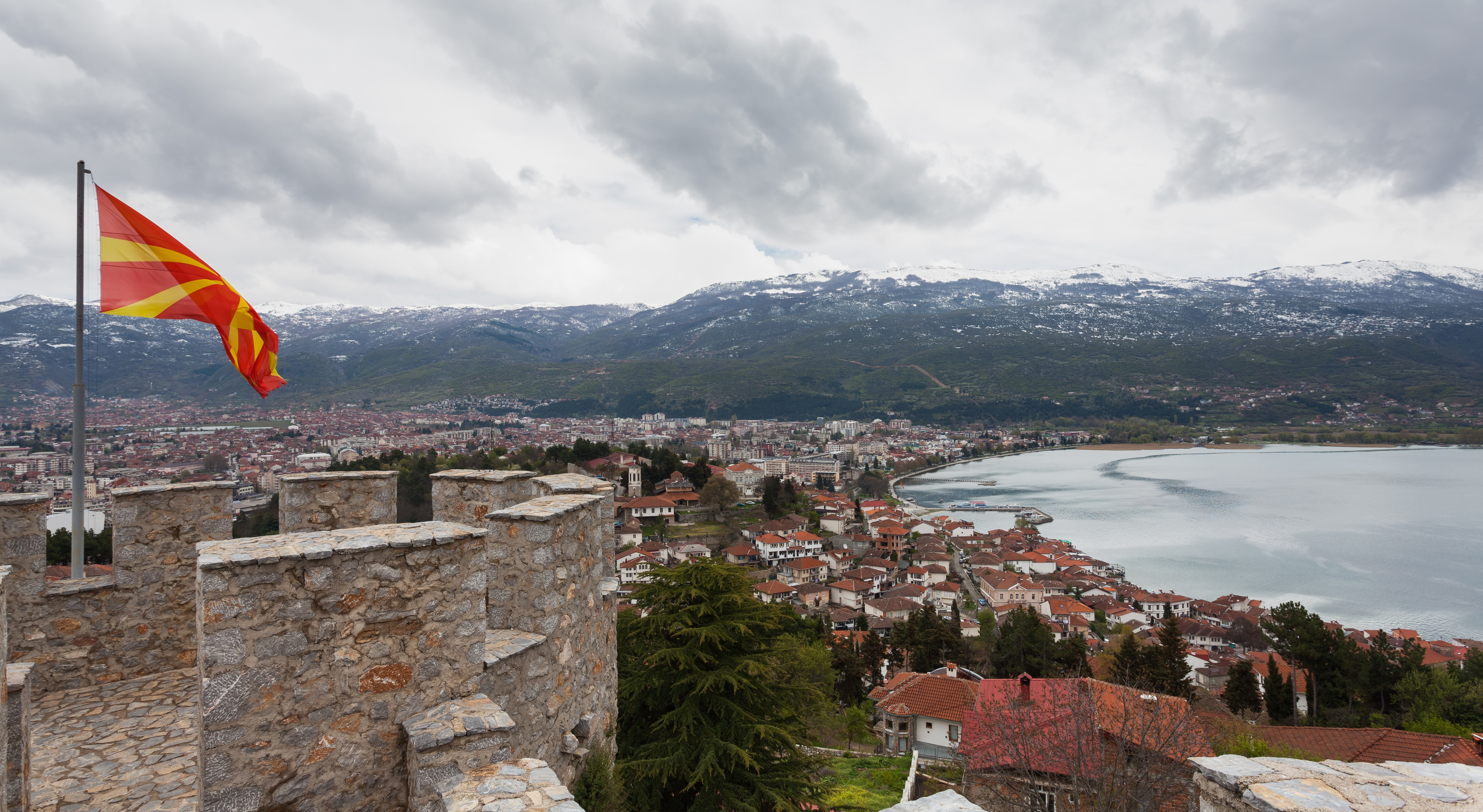
Macedonian flag in Samoil Fortress

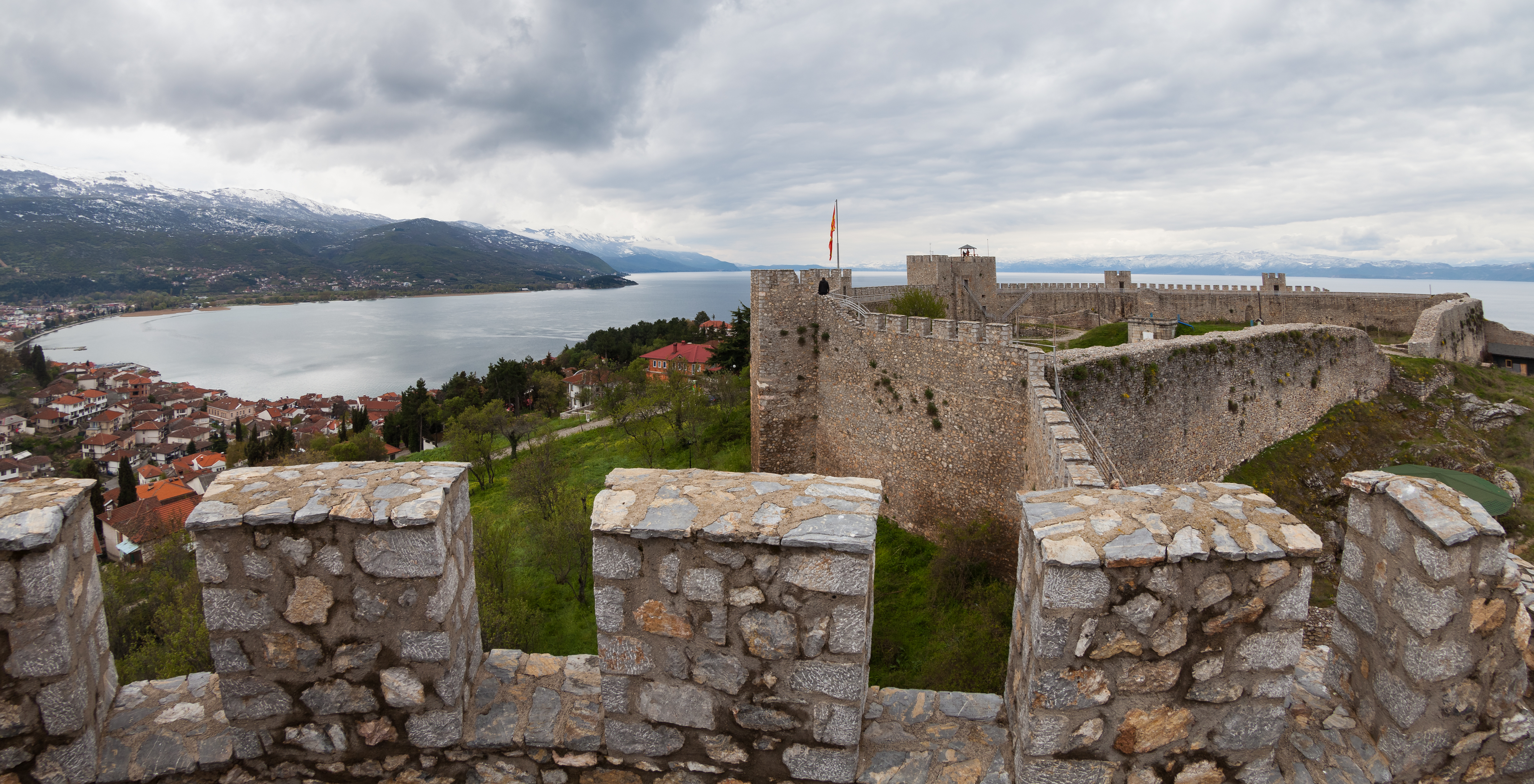
View of the Ohrid lake from the fortress

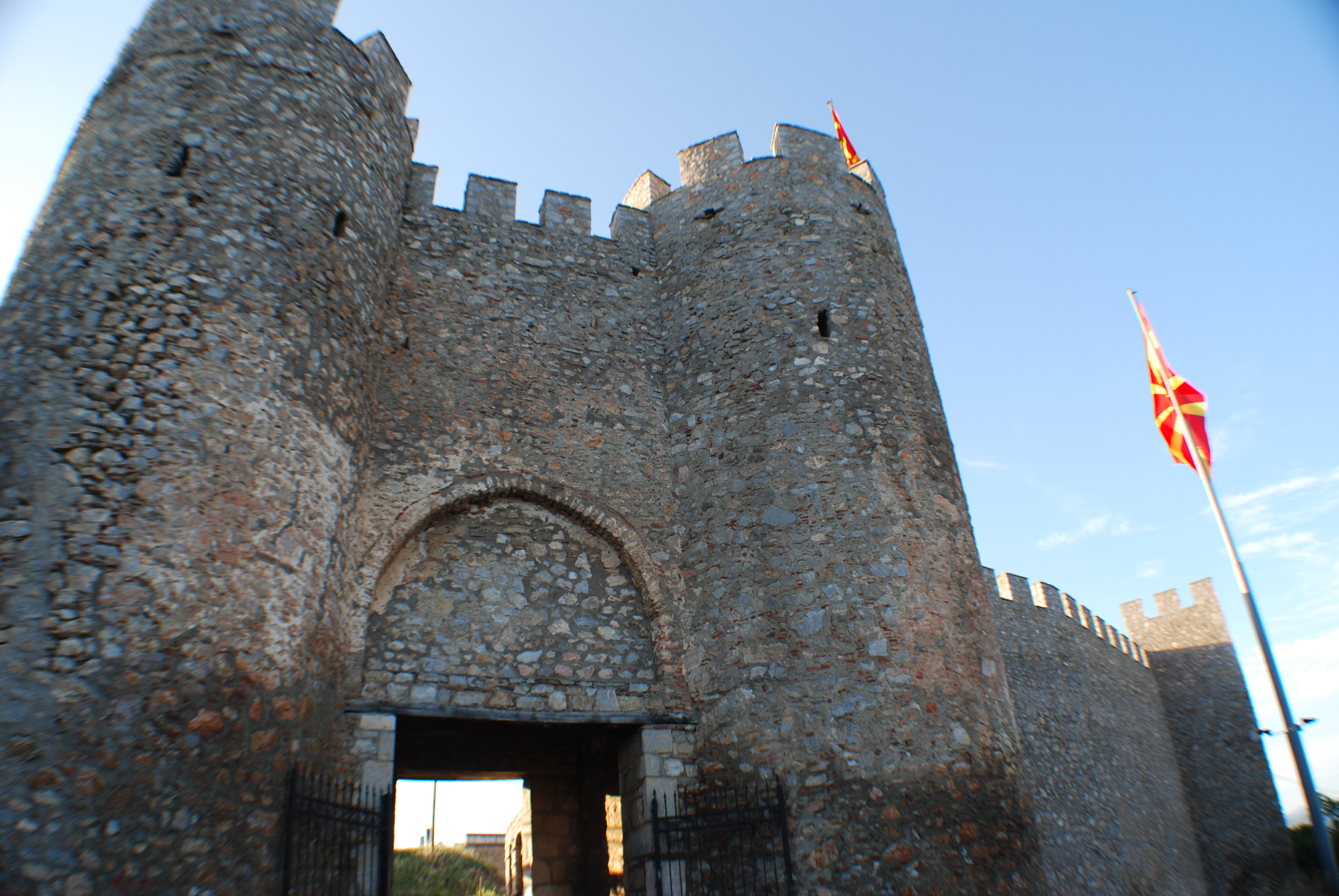
Front gate to the fortress

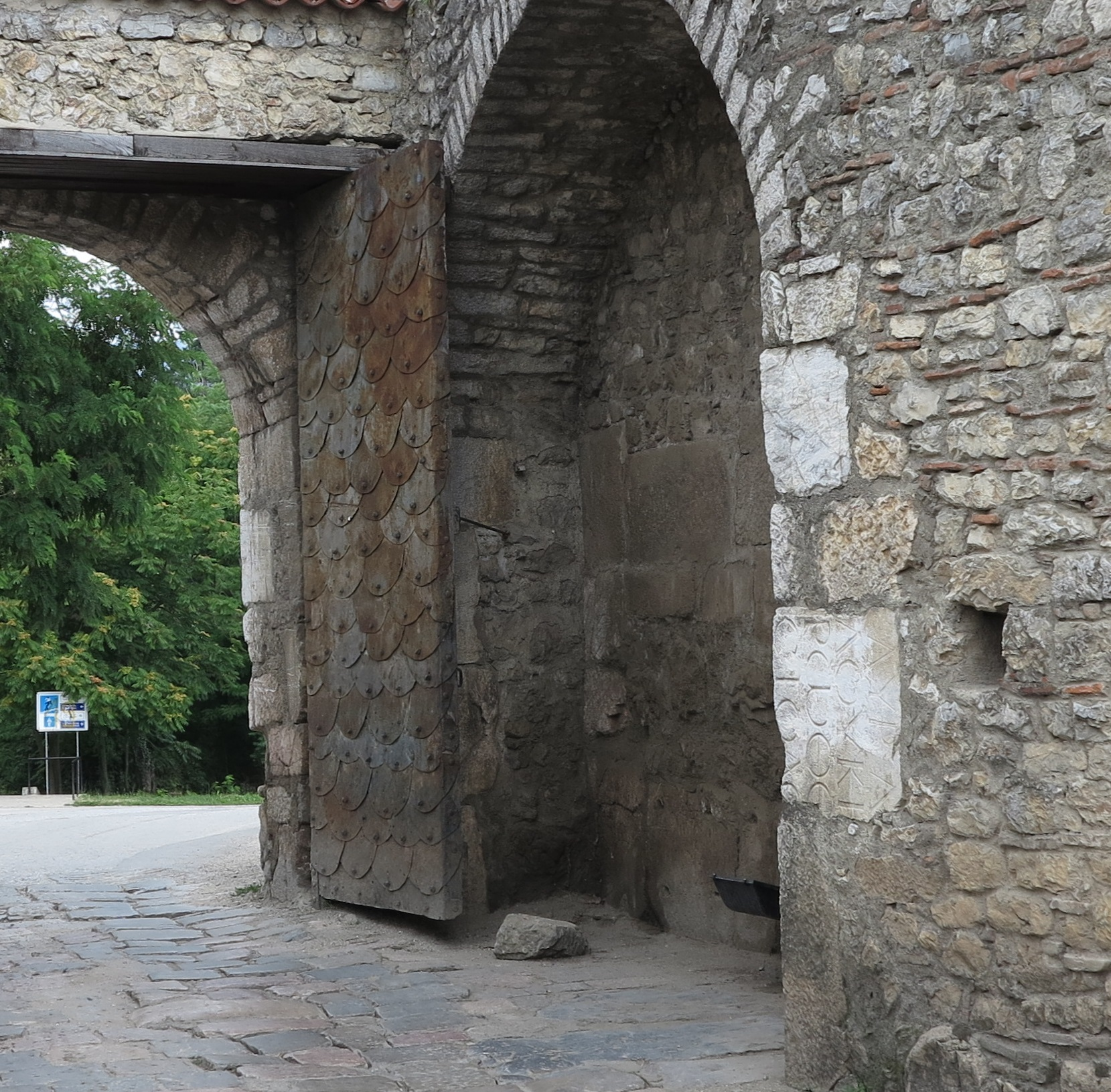
Recycled stones dating from antiquity used in the construction of the upper gate. One of the stones has a fragment of an ancient Greek inscription

== See also ==
- List of castles in North Macedonia
