= 122nd Infantry Division (France) =

122nd Infantry Division was an infantry division of the French Army during the First World War. It was deployed overseas, seeing action on the Salonika front, fighting alongside British troops. It was sent to the Crimea in December 1918 as part of the Army of the Danube.

== Creation and nomenclature ==
- 9 December 1914 – 27 April 1915 : Division provisoire Tassin
- 27 April - 15 June 1915 : Division provisoire Guérin
- starting from 15 June 1915 : 122nd Infantry Division

== Commanders ==
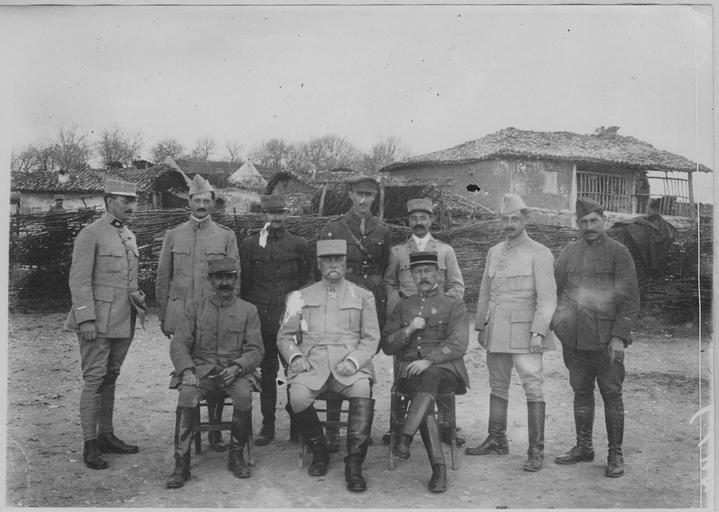
General Régnault and his divisional staff in January 1917.

- 9 December 1914 – 27 April 1915 : Général Tassin
- 27 April - 15 June 1915 : Général Guérin
- 15 June - 20 December 1915 : Général de Lardemelle
- 20 December 1915 – 23 May 1917 : Général Régnault
- 23 May - 2 November 1917 : Général Gérôme
- 2 November 1917 – 1 March 1918 : Général Castaing
- 1 March 1918 : Général Topart

== Chronology ==
=== 1914 ===
- 9 December 1914 – 21 June 1915 : occupation of a sector towards la Neuvillette and north of Loivre.

16 February 1915 : attack on Luxembourg wood.

=== 1915 ===
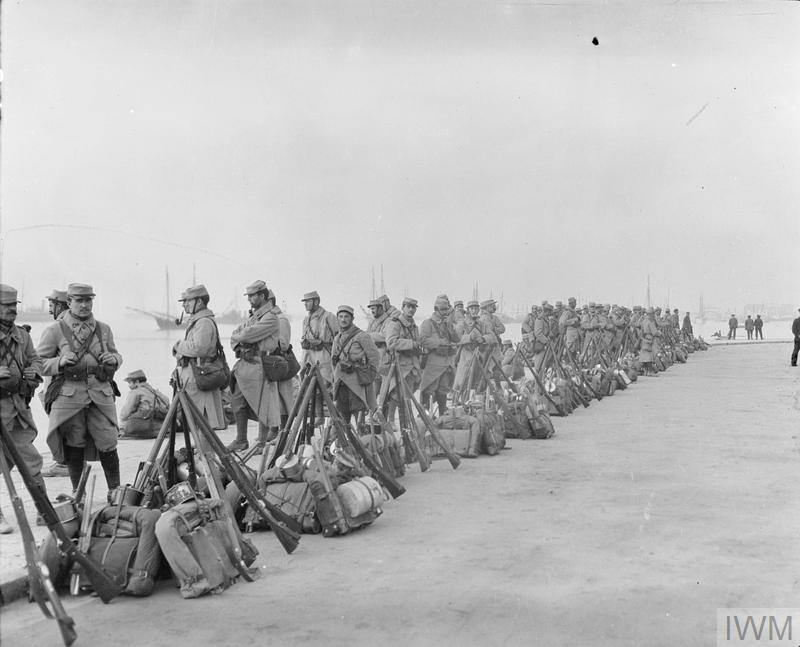
Men of the French 84th Infantry Regiment lined up along the waterfront at Salonika awaiting the order to march to camp, October 1915.

Constitution of the 112th Division between 6 and 15 June 1915, using elements from the Division Provisoire Guérin.

- 21 June - 13 July : taken out of the front line; rest, training and miscellaneous work south-west of Reims.
- 13 July - 4 October : occupation of a sector towards Berry-au-Bac and Loivre

18 August : reduction of the front, on the right, as far as La Neuville, and extension, on the left, as far as La Miette.
22 August : new reduction, on the right, until towards Sapigneul.

- 4–11 October : withdrawal from the front and rest towards Épernay.
- 11–14 October : transport by rail to Toulouse.
- 14–25 October : regrouping and preparation, in respect of their imminent departure for the Orient.
- 25 October - 3 December : transport by rail from Toulouse, to Sète and Toulon, then, by sea, to Salonika.
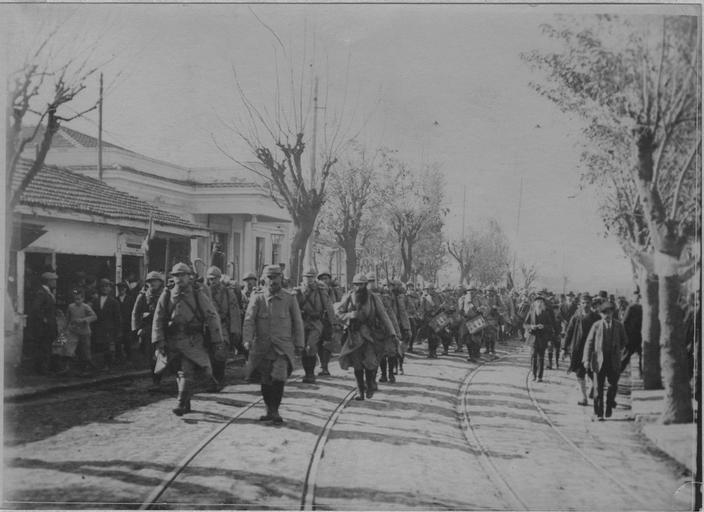
  Troops of the 148th Infantry leaving Salonica for the Serbian front on 6 November 1915.
- As they disembark (from 1 to 12 November), movement of the elements of the 122nd Division towards the front of the lower Tchérna.

11 November : fighting in the Tchitchévo region. From 12 November, defensive battles, then, on the 21st, retreat to the right bank of the Tchérna. (From 30 November, a brigade is brought to Pogradec with a view to establishing a defensive position).

- 3–17 December : engaged in the Retreat to Salonika: 3 and 4 December, fall back to the defensive position at Gradéts.

6–8 December : Bulgarian attacks on Pétrovo, 7 December on Davidovo, and 8 December on Kovanéts.
9 December : fall back to Boyimia; on the 10th, fighting towards Gourintchét; on the 11th, combat and withdrawal between Davidovo and Gevgelija; on the 12th, crossing the Greek border, on both banks of the Vardar, then, from Karasouli (Polykastro), retreat along the left bank, to Dogandji (Prochoma), where the Division arrives on 17 December.

- 17 December 1915 – 31 March 1916 : establishment of the entrenched camp of Salonika, in the Dogandji sector, Dourmouchlou: from January, extension of positions on the front on the right bank of the Vardar, as far as the Kara Azmak (Loudias (river)), by the south-east of Kayali (Ptolemaida) (elements maintained towards Karasouli, in contact with the enemy, south of Matchoukovo (Evzonoi)).

=== 1916 ===
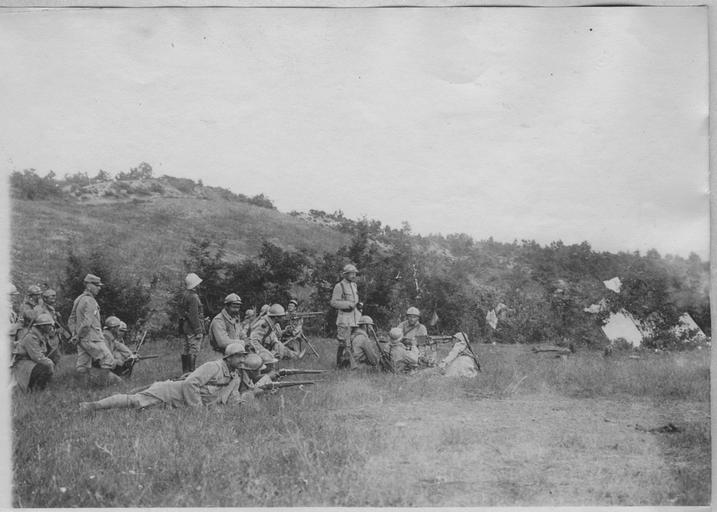
Machine gun teams of the 45th Infantry in the Kilkís region in May 1916.

- 31 March - 28 August : occupation and entrenchment of a sector, straddling the Vardar, towards Lake Ardzan and Lioumnitsa (Skra, Kilkis); attack preparations

20–21 August, Fighting in the hills north of Lioumnitsa (with the help of elements of the 156th Division ).

- 28 August 1916 – 1 January 1917 : Positions on the left bank of the Vardar are relieved by British elements, and extension of the sector towards the west, in the region of Notia: frequent local actions, particularly, on 12, 13 and 14 September, north of the Lioumnitsa trail, Notia, 9 and 17 October and 11 November, towards Hadji Bari Mahala (Theodosia, Kilkis), finally, 11 December, north-west of Mayadag.

=== 1917 ===
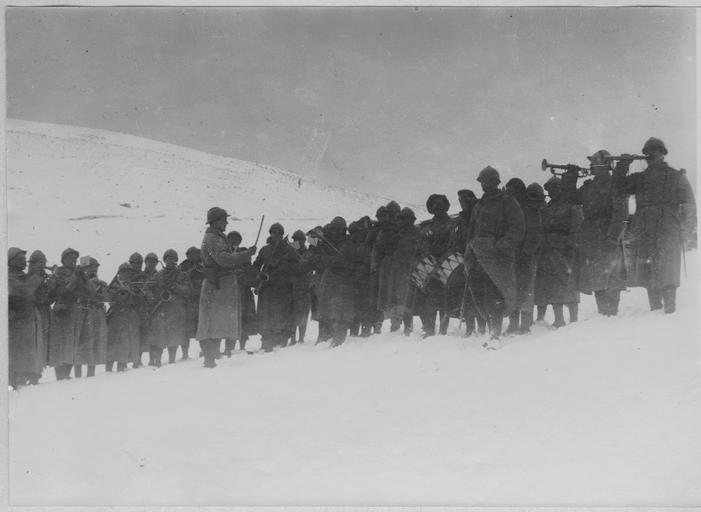
Band of the 84th Infantry, near Livadia, to the west of the Vardar on 20 January 1917.

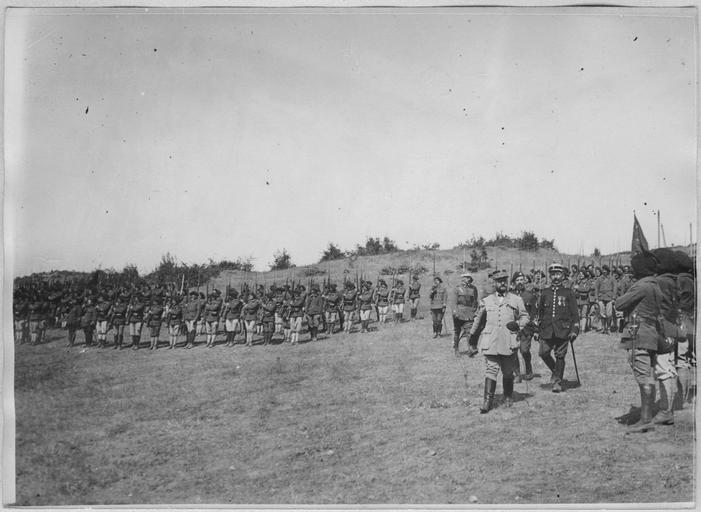
General Gérôme with the 58th BCP in July 1917.

- 1 January - 10 May : preparations for an offensive in the Skra di Legen region.
- 10 May 1917 – 10 July 1918 : Franco-Hellenic operations in the Skra di Legen:

10–14 May 1917 : French attacks, then fortification of the captured positions.
29–30 August : particularly violent engagements. During the first half of November, progressive regrouping of the Division, in the right part of its sector, towards Mayadag (Fanos, Florina).

=== 1918 ===
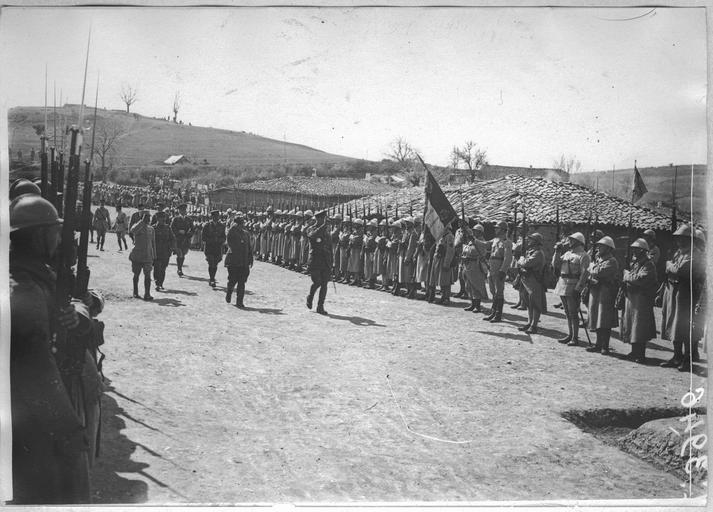
Review by Generals Gérôme and Milne of a battalion of the 148th Infantry on 4 April 1918.

- 10 July - 27 August : withdrawal from the front line and departed towards Veria; rest.
- 27 August - 15 September : deployed close to the front, then occupation of the sector towards Mount Sokol and Dobro Pole; offensive preparations.
- 15 September - 11 November : engaged in the Battle of Dobro Pole: seizure of Dobro Pole and Sokol. Then relieved from the front line and rest towards Vértékop (Skydra) then towards Guvezné (Assiros).

In October: movement, via Dráma, through eastern Macedonia : advance towards Turkey (in conjunction with British elements); movement by Xanthi and Gumuldjina (Komotini), towards the Maritsa.
In November: crossing of the Maritsa and occupation of Uzunköprü.

== Order of battle ==
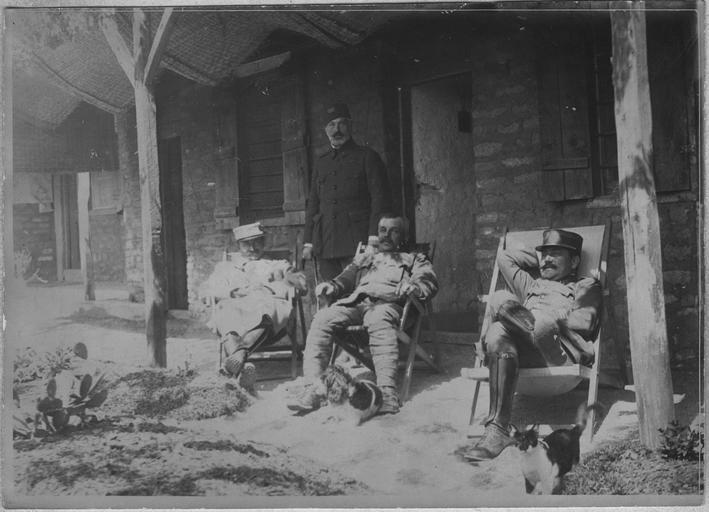
Colonel Marquis, officer commanding the 8th Brigade (45th & 148th Infantry) and his staff officers in May 1917.

- Infantry :

- 8th Brigade

45th Infantry Regiment from June 1915 to November 1918
148th Infantry Regiment from June 1915 to November 1918

- 243rd Brigade

84th Infantry Regiment from June 1915 to November 1918
248th Infantry Regiment from June 1915 to September 1917 (dissolution)
58th Battalion of Chasseurs à pied from October 1915 to October 1917

- Cavalry :

1 Squadron of the 6th Dragoon Regiment from June 1915 to January 1917
1 Squadron of the 29th Dragoon Regiment from January 1917 to November 1918

- Artillery :

2 groupes (2x 3x 75mm batteries) from the 41st Field Artillery Regiment from June 1915 to July 1917
1 groupe (3x 75mm) from the 6th Field Artillery Regiment from January 1916 à July 1917
All nine of the 75mm batteries above were grouped together to form the 241st Field Artillery Regiment from July 1917 to November 1918
1 groupe (3x 65mm batteries) from the 1st Mountain Artillery Regiment from January 1916 to November 1918
107th half battery of 58mm mortars from the 41st Field Artillery Regiment from June 1915 to July 1916
111st Battery (of 58mm mortars) from the 1st Mountain Artillery Regiment from July 1916 to July 1917
The above redesignated as the 101st Battery (of 58mm mortars) of the 241st Field Artillery Regiment from July 1917 to November 1918

- Engineers :

Field Companies (2/14, 2/64, 2/24) from the 3rd Engineer Regiment
