= Idomenae =

Town in ancient Macedonia

Coordinates: 41°16′39″N 22°29′38″E

Idomenae or Idomenai (Ancient Greek: Ἰδομεναί, possibly from Ἰδομενεύς - Idomeneus), also known as Eidomene (Εἰδομενή) or Idomene (Ἰδομένη), or Eidomenae or Eidomenai, or Idomenia, was a town of ancient Macedonia, now located in North Macedonia. The Tabula Peutingeriana places Idomenae between Stena and Tauriana; 12 m.p. from Stena, which in modern units is about 11 miles (18 km).

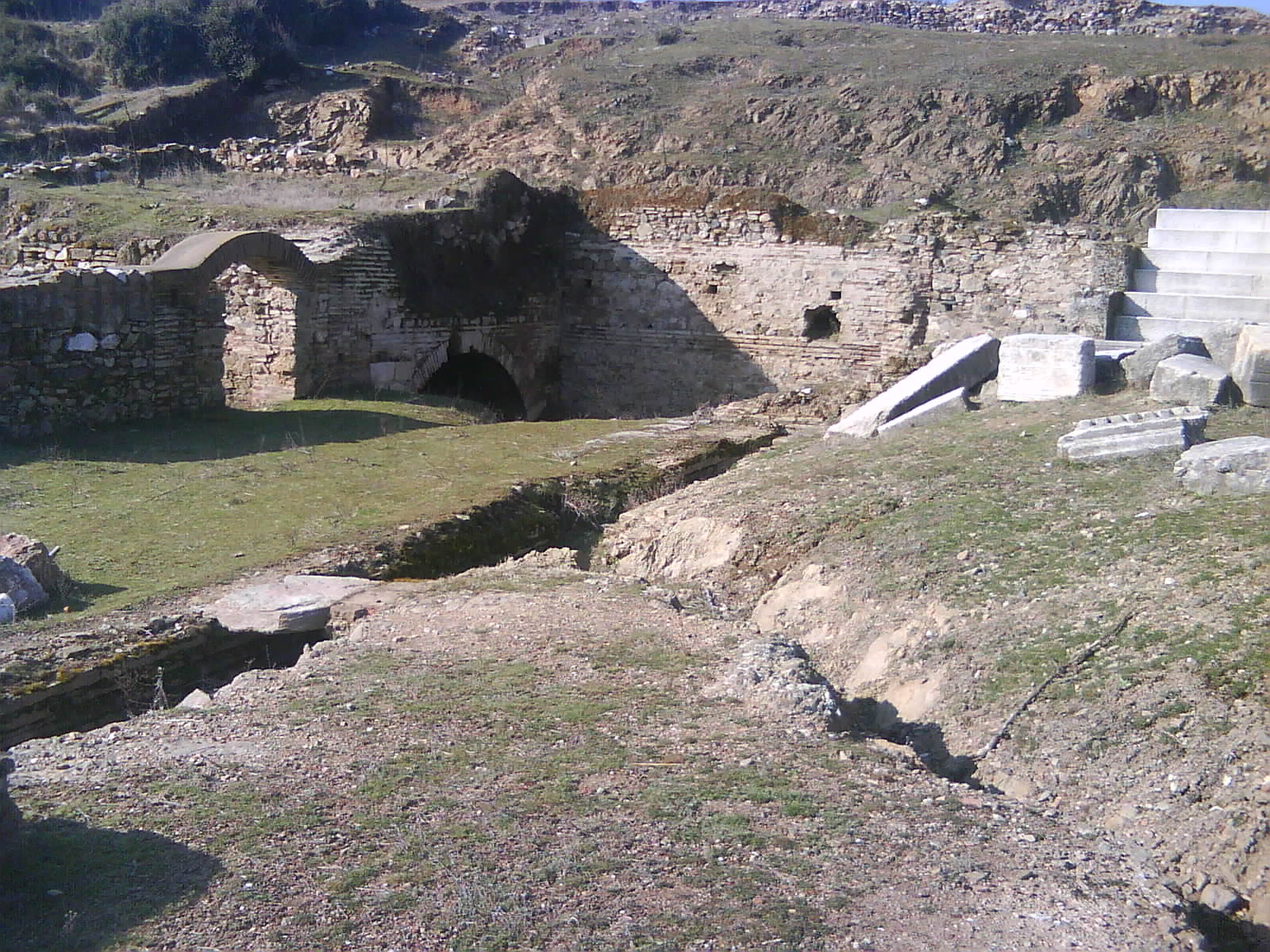
Forum of Idomenae where the ruins of its acropolis can be found

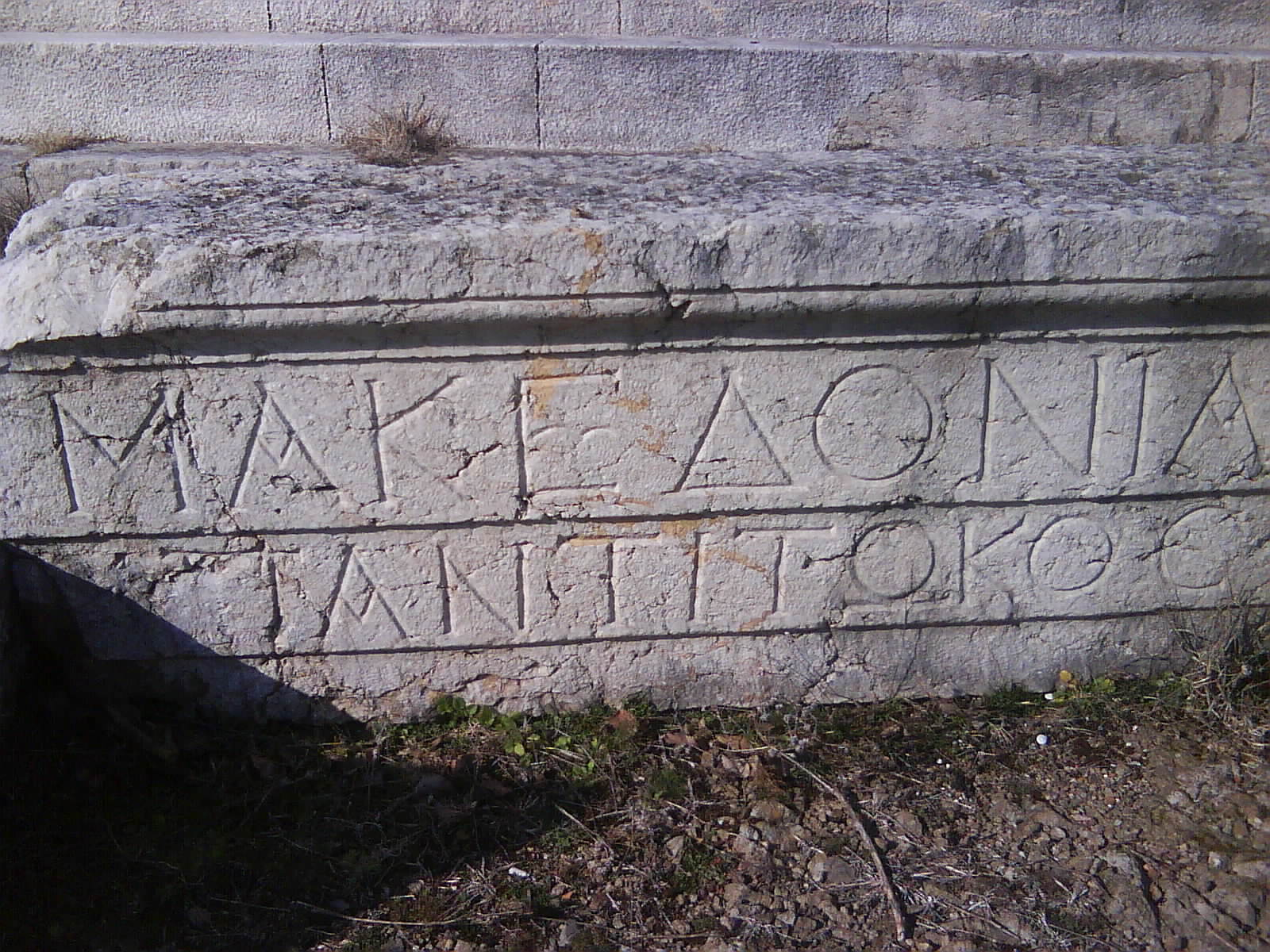
Inscription at Idomenae

== History ==
The most important archaeological site of the Valandovo Municipality was inhabited from the 7th century BC until the 6th century AD. The ruins at Isar, Marvinci are believed to be the ancient Macedonian town of Idomenae, which first appeared in documentation in the 5th century BC during the Peloponnesian War. It sits on a hill above the Vardar River. This was a fortified settlement formed near the springs of the river. It later became a Roman city.

Sitalces, king of Thrace, on his route from Thrace to Macedonia, crossed Mount Cercine, leaving the Paeones on his right, and the Sinti and Maedi on his left, and descended upon the long river Axius at Idomenae. Sitalces and his troops destroyed Idomenae in 429 B.C.

It is described by Ptolemy as being within the province of Emathia, and was near Doberus, in Paeonia. It is named by Hierocles among the towns of the Byzantine Diocese of Macedonia. Idomenae is documented from the early to mid-5th century BCE.

Before becoming a part of the province of Emathia the city was the administrative center of the Parorbelia region of ancient Macedonia. During the rule of Philip II the region was defunct and incorporated together with Idomenae into Lower Macedonia. According to the theorodokoi (officials responsible for receiving sacred envoys sent to consult an oracle) list from Delphi, the city of Idomenae was represented by two theorodokoi: Hikkotimos (Ἱκκότιμος) and Ameinocrates (Ἀμεινοκράτης).

It is now the archaeological site of Isar, located near the village of Marvinci, in the Valandovo municipality of modern-day North Macedonia. The Peutinger Map mentions it as Idomenia.

== Archaeology ==
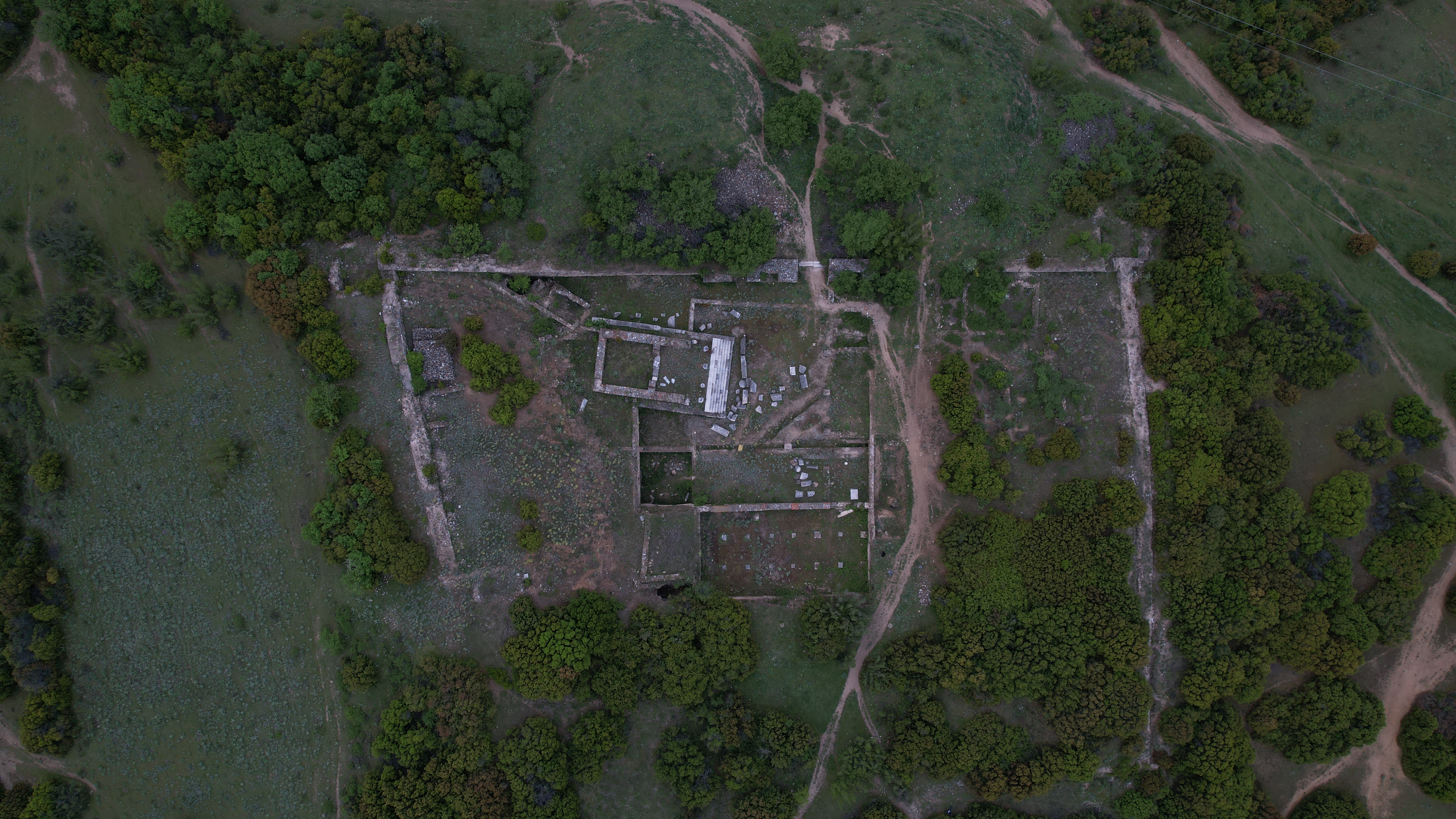
Air view of Idomenae

At its beginning, Idomenae was about 5,000 km^{2} big. An acropolis with defensive walls was built, a pottery building was also built, and so were other buildings. The people in this town traded a lot with the Asia Minor, which is evidenced by the facts that much of the material found on pottery here was used in graves in Asia Minor. There are also many amphoras from the islands of Thassos and Rhodes.

Idomenae together with the site of Vardarski Rid make up the two oldest ancient Macedonian sites in North Macedonia.

== Modern Idomeni ==
The village of Idomeni in Greece, located right next to the border, was renamed after the ancient town in 1936. Before that it was known as Sehovo or Seovo.
