= Isar, Marvinci =

Archaeological site in Macedonia

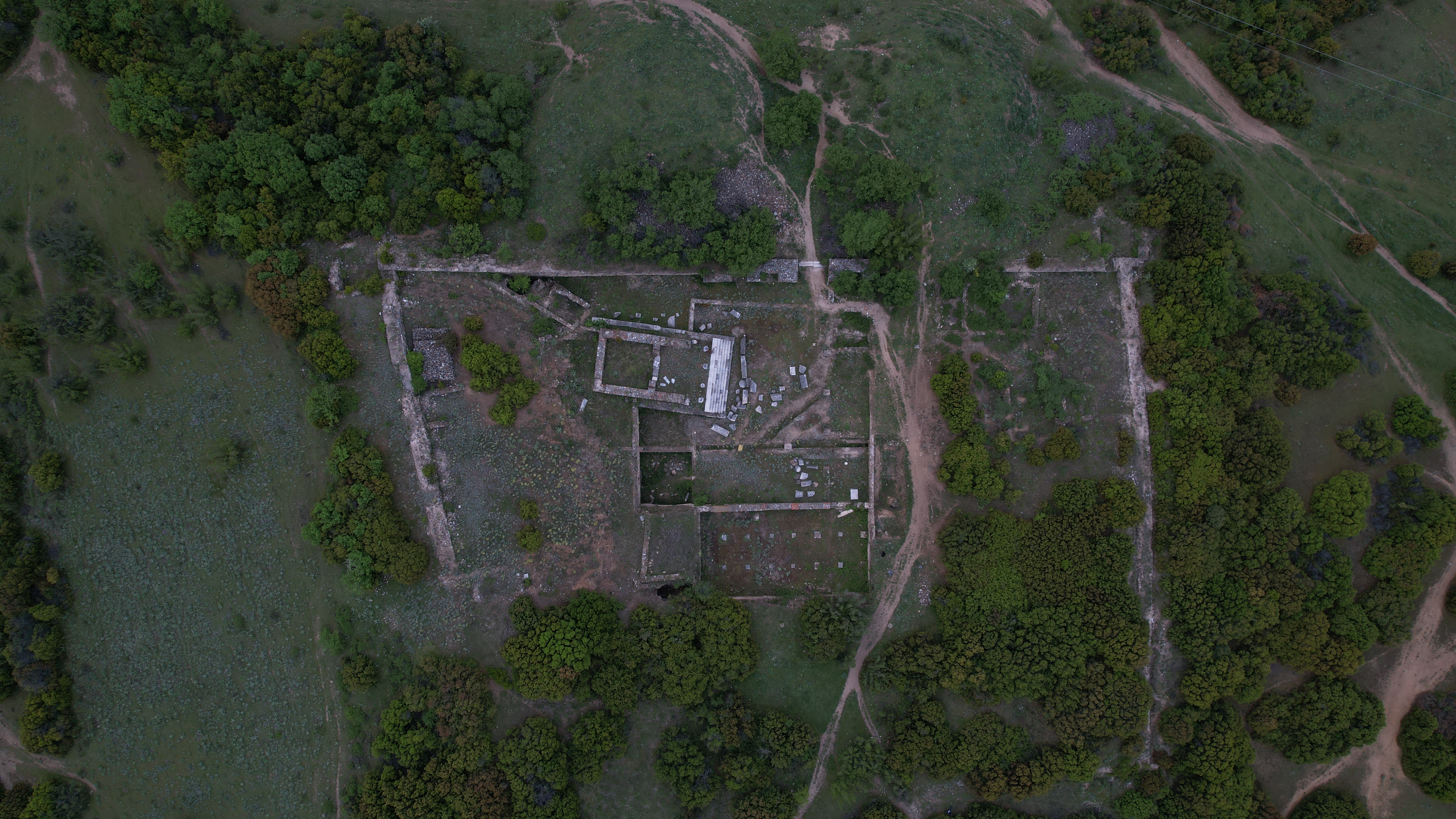
Air view at Isar

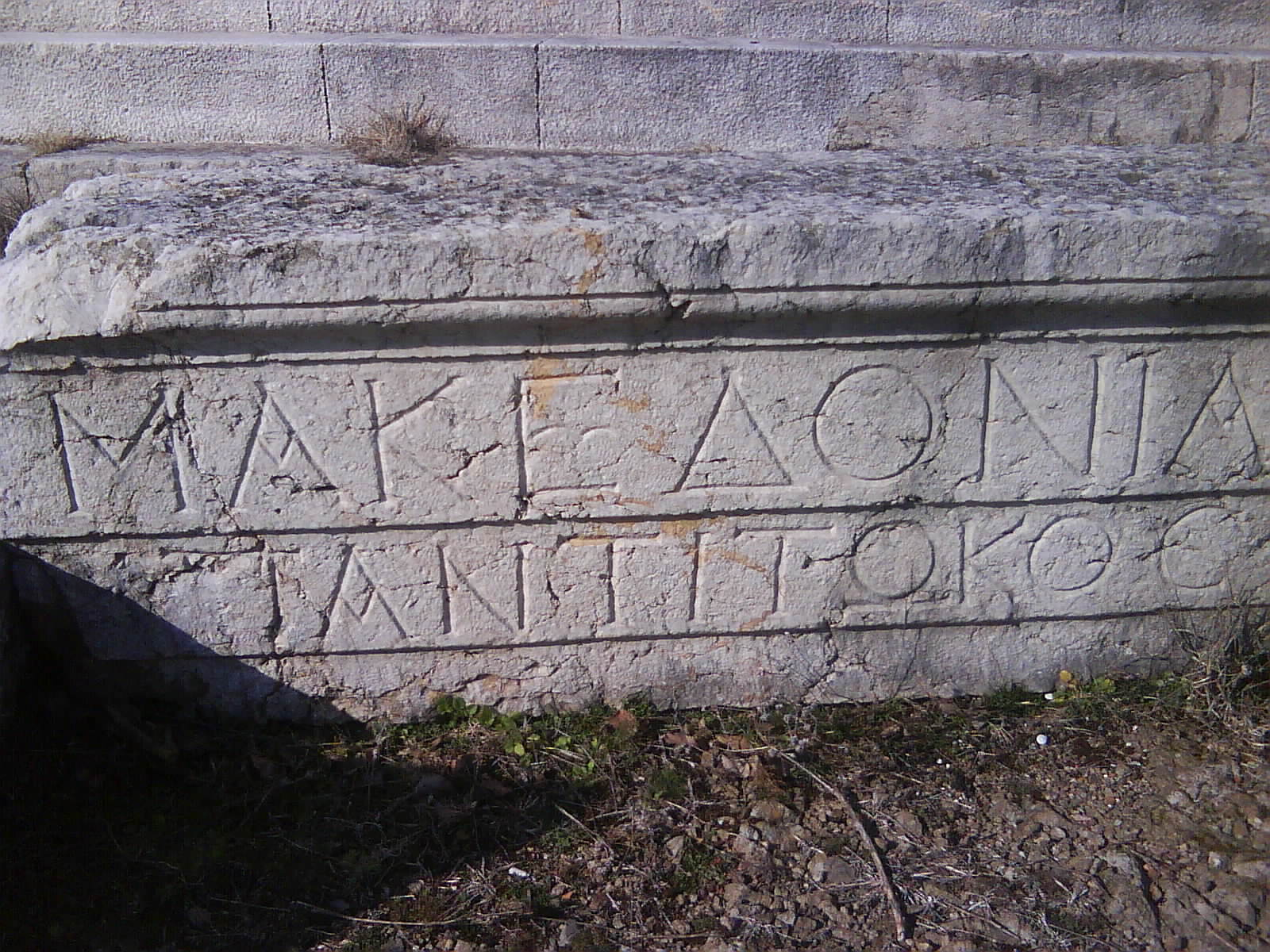
Inscription at Isar

Isar is an archaeological site located in Marvinci, a village situated in the south-eastern areas of North Macedonia. It is only 18.6 kilometres north of the town of Gevgelija. According to Macedonian archaeologists the site has roughly well over 200 graves and is only a few kilometres from the town of Valandovo. Archaeological digging and examining was conducted between 1977 and 1986. The archaeological finds were transported to the Museum of the Republic of North Macedonia. The archaeological findings there are dated from the period between the Bronze Age to the late antiquity. A discovered artifacts from the 4rd century BC reveal that the name of the local settlement was Idomenae. The archeological site contains remnants of a temple and stadium, designed according to the ancient Roman style.
