= Miletkovo =

Miletkovo Милетково
- Village
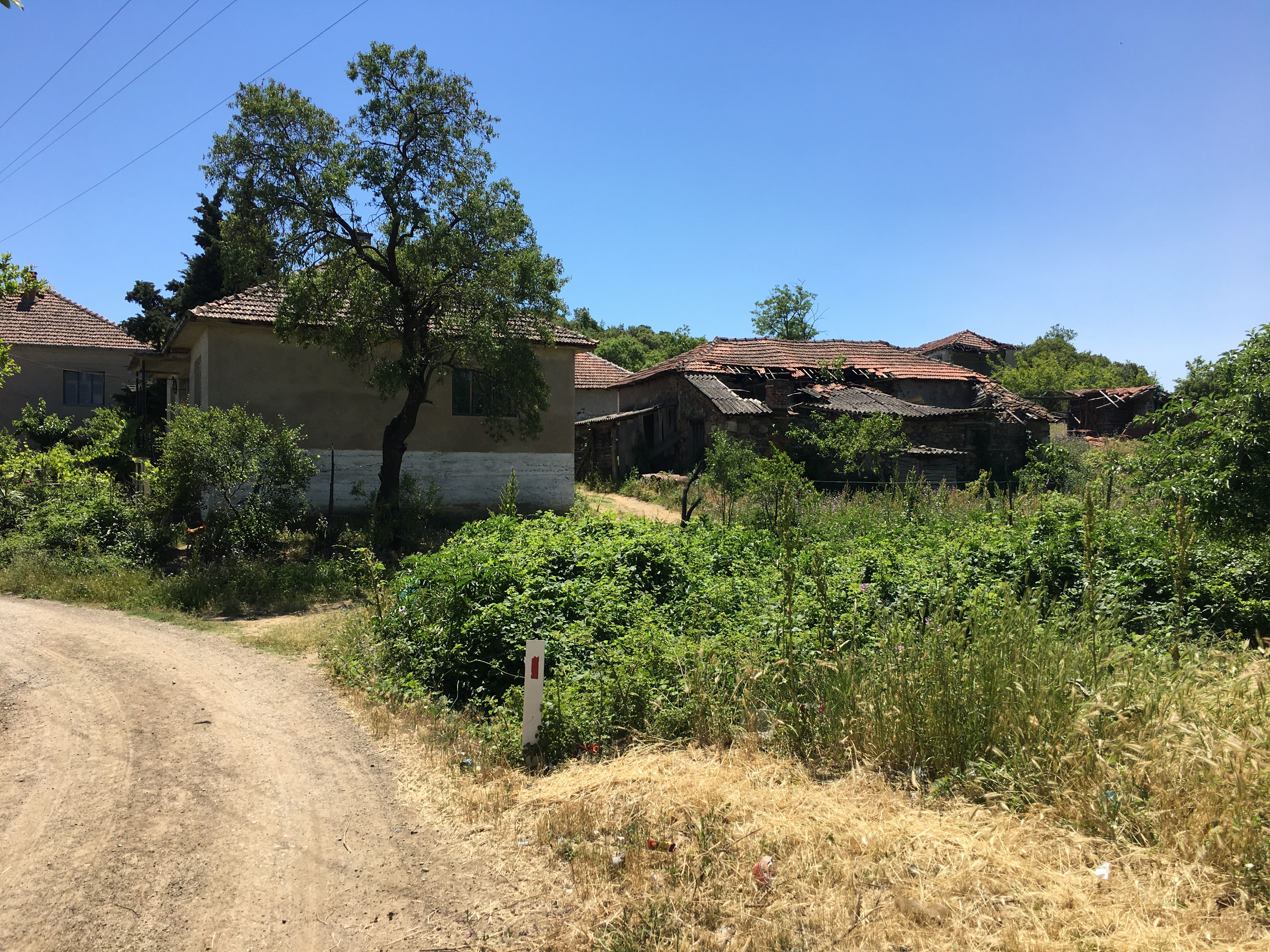
- Houses in the village

- Location within North Macedonia
- Coordinates: 41.283361°N 22.462005°E
- Country: North Macedonia
- Region: Southeastern
- Municipality: Gevgelija

Population (2021)
  - Total: 113
- Time zone: UTC+1 (CET)
  - Summer (DST): UTC+2 (CEST)
- Website: .

Miletkovo (Macedonian: Милетково) is a village in the municipality of Gevgelija, North Macedonia. It used to be part of the former municipality Miravci.

== Demographics ==
As of the 2021 census, Miletkovo had 113 residents with the following ethnic composition:

- Macedonians 110
- Albanians 3

According to the 2002 census, the village had a total of 117 inhabitants. Ethnic groups in the village include:

- Macedonians 107
- Serbs 10
