= Bogorodica =

Bogorodica is the Serbo-Croatian and Macedonian religious term for Mary, the "Mother of God" (Theotokos). It may refer to:

- Bogorodica, Gevgelija, a village in North Macedonia
- Madonna (1999 film), a Croatian film
- Theotokos, a title of Mary, mother of Jesus
