= Di Gaspar =

Painter and graphic artist (1938–2022)

- Born: Dimitrije Lorenca Gaspar; 12 April 1938; Gevgelija, Kingdom of Yugoslavia
- Died: 15 September 2022 (aged 84); Gevgelija, North Macedonia
- Education: Academy of Fine Arts in Belgrade
- Known for: Painting, drawing
- Movement: Surrealism; symbolism

Signature
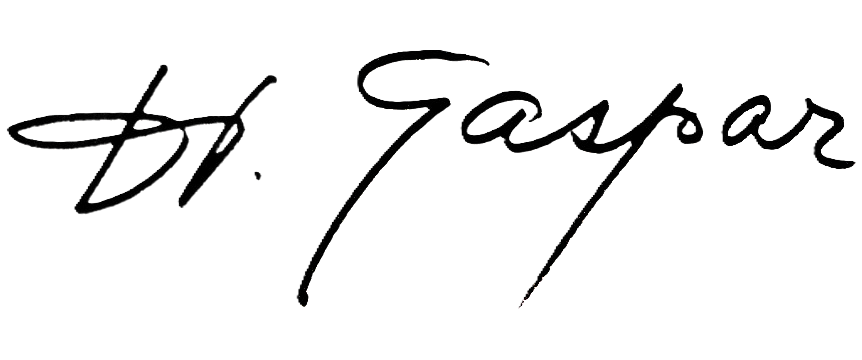

Di Gaspar (born Dimitrije Lorenca Gaspar; 12 April 1938 – 15 September 2022) was a painter and graphic artist whose work combined elements of surrealism and symbolism with mythological themes.

== Biography ==
Gaspar was born in Gevgelija, in the former Kingdom of Yugoslavia, in 1938. He studied at the School of Art in Skopje and completed his education at the Academy of Fine Arts in Belgrade.

Gaspar worked primarily in oil painting and drawing. His paintings featured surrealistic imagery incorporating mythological subjects and symbolic elements. His compositions frequently depicted female figures, ancient world imagery, and combined symbolic elements. Gaspar worked as an independent artist, a status he discussed in a 1987 interview with the newspaper Večer.

Gaspar exhibited in Yugoslavia, Greece, Sweden, Germany, and the United States. His work was shown in Sweden in 1977, in Germany in 1989, and in the United States in 1990. In 1992, a television documentary on Gaspar's work was produced, directed by Trajče Eftimovski. His drawings were exhibited at the World Gallery of Drawings Osten in Skopje in 2009 and 2010.

Gaspar died in Gevgelija on 15 September 2022.
