= Smokvica, Gevgelija =

Smokvica Смоквица
- Village
- Location within North Macedonia
- Coordinates: 41.258453°N 22.469880°E
- Country: North Macedonia
- Region: Southeastern
- Municipality: Gevgelija

Population (2002)
  - Total: 263
- Time zone: UTC+1 (CET)
  - Summer (DST): UTC+2 (CEST)
- Website: .

Smokvica (Macedonian: Смоквица) is a village in the municipality of Gevgelija, North Macedonia. It used to be part of the former municipality Miravci.

== Demographics ==
According to the 2002 census, the village had a total of 263 inhabitants. Ethnic groups in the village include:

- Macedonians 263

As of 2021, the village of Smokvica has 190 inhabitants and the ethnic composition was the following:

- Macedonians – 177
- Serbs – 3
- others – 4
- Person without Data - 6
