= TV Nova 12 =

Nova 12 (Нова 12)
- Country: North Macedonia
- Broadcast area: Southeastern Macedonian
- Headquarters: Gevgelija, North Macedonia

Programming
- Language(s): Macedonian

Ownership
- Owner: private

History
- Launched: 1992
- Former names: Channel 12 (Канал 12)

TV Nova 12 (also known as Channel 12) is first private TV channel in North Macedonia, formed after the fall of communism in 1992 in Gevgelija. The first name of the television had been Channel 12, but since 2004 it has operated operate under the name Nova 12.
