= Negorci =

Village in North Macedonia

Negorci Негорци
- Village
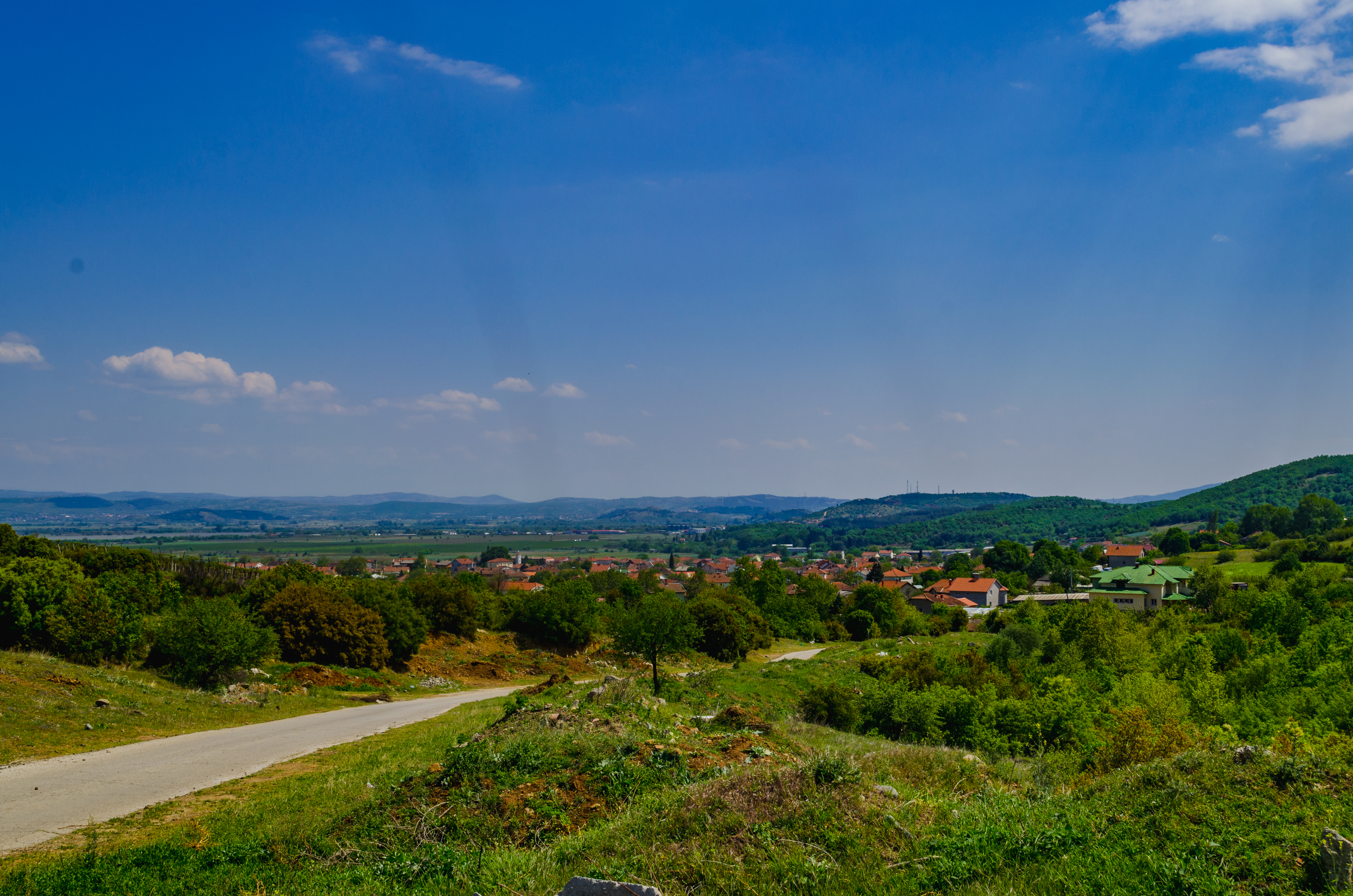
- Negorci

- Location within North Macedonia
- Country: North Macedonia
- Region: Southeastern
- Municipality: Gevgelija

Population (2002)
  - Total: 2,047
- Time zone: UTC+1 (CET)
  - Summer (DST): UTC+2 (CEST)
- Website: .

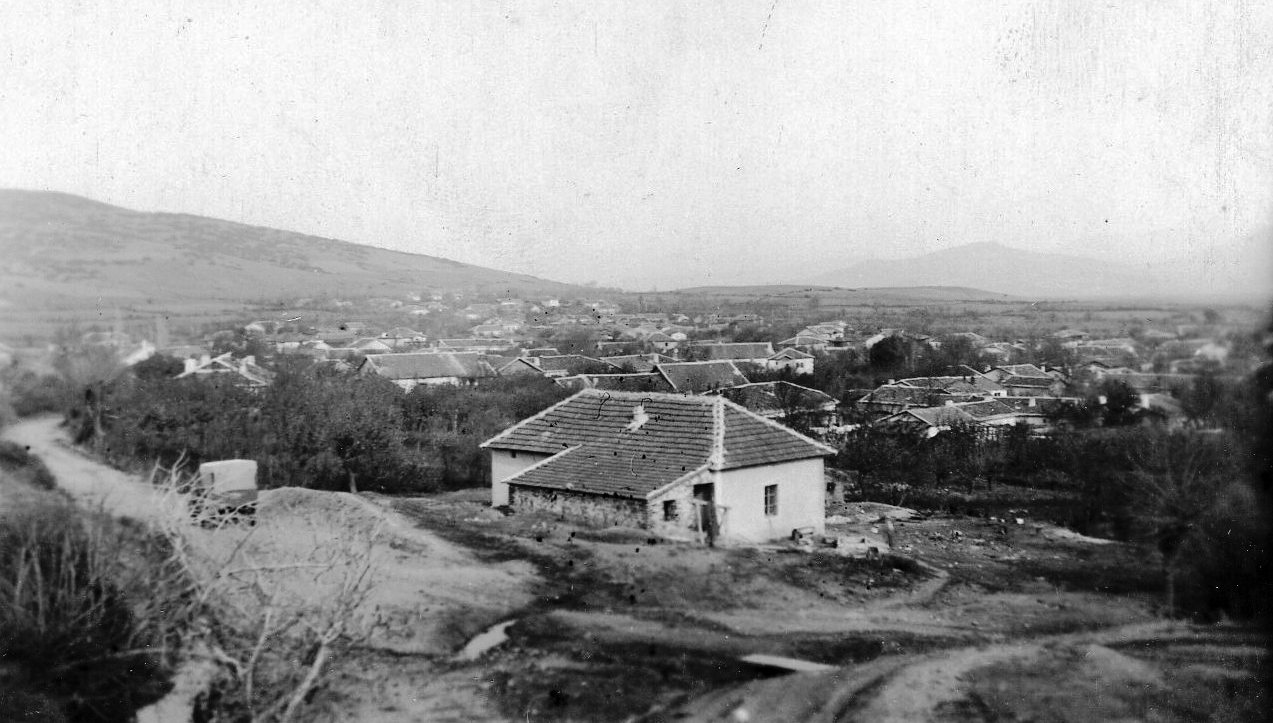
Negorci, photo from 1931

Negorci (Macedonian: Негорци) is a village located 5 km north from the city of Gevgelija in North Macedonia.

== Natural conditions ==
The village of Negorci is located in the historic area of Bojmija. The village is on the right side of Vardar river and, at the eastern foot of the mountain Kožuf, at approximately 80 meters above sea level. East of the village is a valley and west rise mountain.

Local climate is modified Continental with a significant impact of Aegean (hot summers).

== Population ==
Negorci according to the last census from 2002 had 2,047 inhabitants.

The majority of the population in the village are ethnic Macedonian (99%) and the rest are mostly Serbs.

Predominant religion of the local population is Orthodoxy.

As of 2021, the village of Negorci has 1.768 inhabitants and the ethnic composition was the following:

- Macedonians – 1.687
- Albanians – 2
- Aromanians - 1
- Serbs – 4
- others – 12
- Person without Data - 62
