= Bansko (disambiguation) =

Bansko is a town in Bulgaria. Bansko (Cyrillic: Банско) may also refer to

- PFC Bansko, a football club based in Bansko, Bulgaria
- Bansko Municipality in Bulgaria
- Bansko Peak in Antarctica
- Bansko, North Macedonia, a village
