= Petrovo, Gevgelija =

Petrovo Петрово
- Village
- Location within North Macedonia
- Coordinates: 41.295576°N 22.383366°E
- Country: North Macedonia
- Region: Southeastern
- Municipality: Gevgelija

Population (2002)
  - Total: 206
- Time zone: UTC+1 (CET)
  - Summer (DST): UTC+2 (CEST)
- Website: .

Petrovo (Macedonian: Петрово) is a village in the municipality of Gevgelija, North Macedonia. It used to be part of the former municipality Miravci.

== Demographics ==
According to the 2002 census, the village had a total of 206 inhabitants. Ethnic groups in the village include:

- Macedonians 204
- Serbs 1
- Bosniaks 1
