= Novo Konjsko =

Village in North Macedonia

Novo Konjsko Ново Коњско
- Village
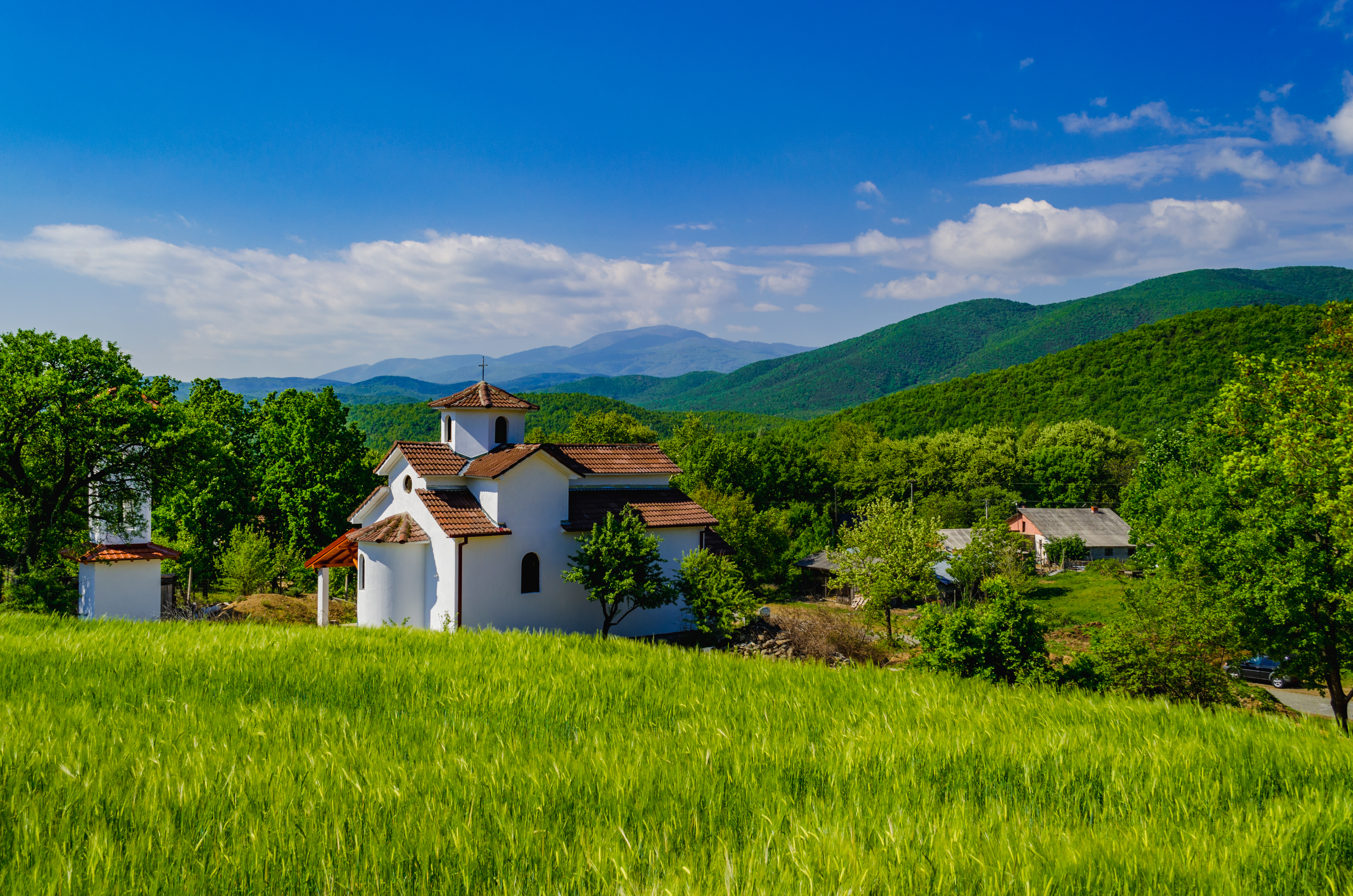

- Location within North Macedonia
- Coordinates: 41.154766°N 22.437554°E
- Country: North Macedonia
- Region: Southeastern
- Municipality: Gevgelija

Population (2021)
  - Total: 168
- Time zone: UTC+1 (CET)
  - Summer (DST): UTC+2 (CEST)
- Website: .

Novo Konjsko (Macedonian: Ново Коњско) is a village located in the Gevgelija Municipality of North Macedonia.

== Demographics ==
As of the 2021 census, Novo Konjsko had 168 residents with the following ethnic composition:

- Macedonians 155
- Persons for whom data are taken from administrative sources 9

Albanians - 1

- Serbs - 1
- Others 2

According to the 2002 census, the village had a total of 136 inhabitants. Ethnic groups in the village include:

- Macedonians 134
- Serbs 2
