= Davidovo, Gevgelija =

Davidovo Давидово
- Village
- Location within North Macedonia
- Coordinates: 41.331975°N 22.432731°E
- Country: North Macedonia
- Region: Southeastern
- Municipality: Gevgelija

Population (2021)
  - Total: 302
- Time zone: UTC+1 (CET)
  - Summer (DST): UTC+2 (CEST)
- Website: .

Davidovo (Macedonian: Давидово) is a village in the municipality of Gevgelija, North Macedonia. It used to be part of the former municipality Miravci.

== Demographics ==
According to the 2002 census, the village had a total of 373 inhabitants. Ethnic groups in the village include:

- Macedonians 370
- Serbs 1
- Others 2

As of 2021, the village of Davidovo has 302 inhabitants and the ethnic composition was the following:

- Macedonians – 299
- Person without Data - 3
