= Vardarski Rid =

Archaeological site in North Macedonia

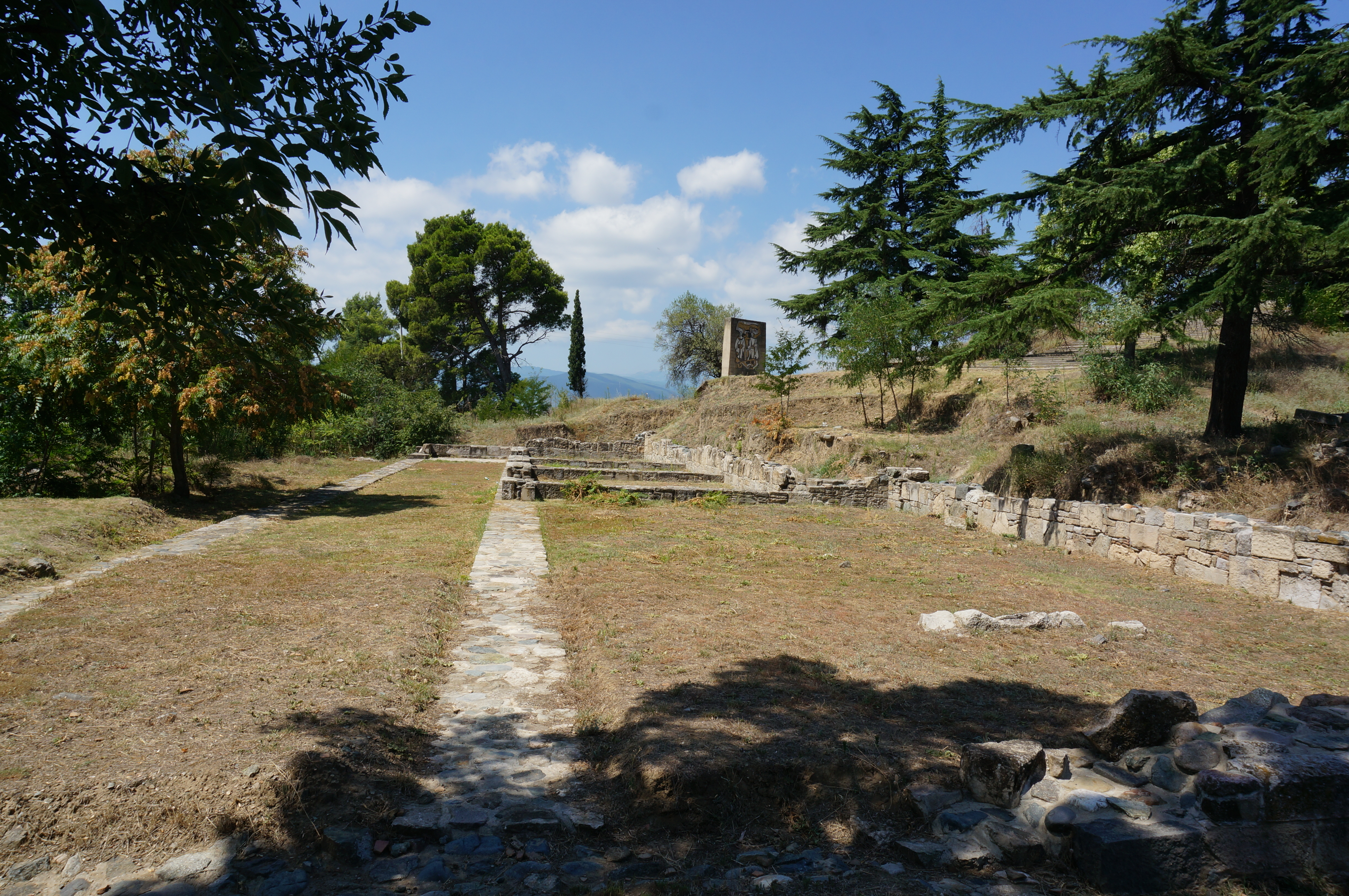
- View of forum
- Interactive map of Vardarski Rid
- 41°8′55″N 22°31′13″E

Vardarski Rid also known as Gordynia is an archaeological site in Gevgelija, North Macedonia of a town dating from Early Antiquity. Archaeological excavations reveal the architectural layout of the monumental stoa, an acropolis, and other segments from the settlement. Vardarski Rid is also used today as a picnic spot.

Vardarski Rid together with the site of Idomenae make up the two oldest ancient Macedonian sites in North Macedonia.

== Geography ==
Vardarski Rid is located in the central part of the Lower Vardar Valley. It is located at a dominant strategic position above the Gevgelija Plain, Gevgelija, and the Vardar River. The Vardar River surrounds the ancient town's northern and eastern border. The lowlands of the Gevgelija Plain stretch west and south of Vardarski Rid. The site consists of two hills, one hill is taller and steeper, and the other is shorter.

== Museum ==
Parts of the excavations are exhibited in the municipal museum, Gevgelija.

== See also ==
- Heraclea Lyncestis
- Stobi
- Idomenae
