= Doberus =

Coordinates: 41°22′57″N 22°45′15″E

Doberus or Doberos (Ancient Greek: Δόβηρος) was a town of Paeonia, which Sitalces reached after crossing Mount Cercine, and where many troops and additional volunteers reached him, making up his full total. Hierocles calls the town Diaborus or Diaboros (Διάβορος) and names it next to Idomenae among the towns of Macedonia Prima under the Byzantine Empire; this, coupled with the statement of Ptolemy that it belonged to the Aestraei, would seem to show that Doberus was near the modern Dojran. Suda called it Dobeira (Δόβειρα).

Doberus was the seat of a bishop in antiquity. In modern times, it is a titular see of the Roman Catholic Church.

The site of Doberus is near the modern Bansko, North Macedonia.
