= Moin, Gevgelija =

Village in North Macedonia

Moin Моин
- Village
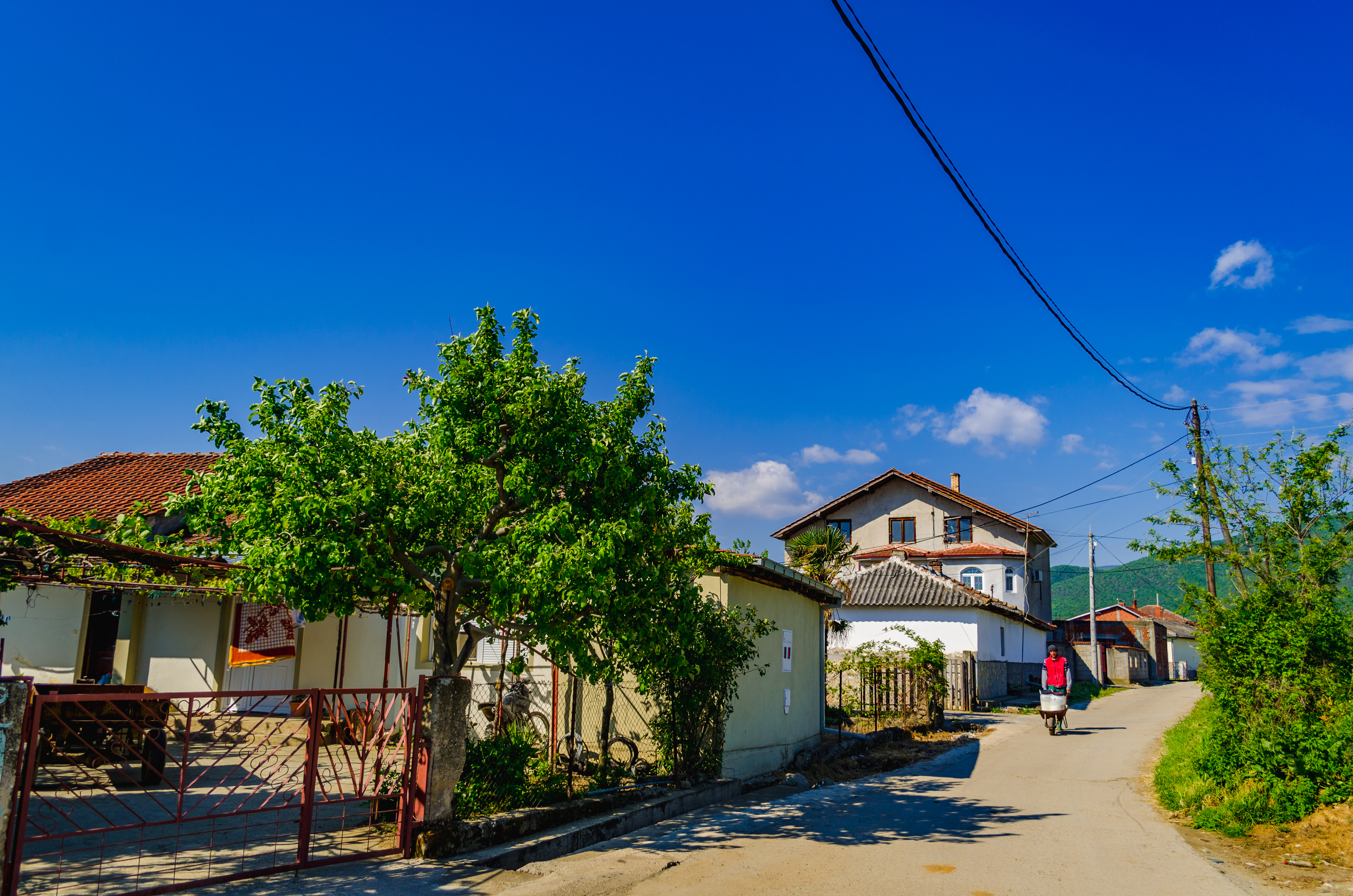

- Location within North Macedonia
- Coordinates: 41.134043°N 22.449575°E
- Country: North Macedonia
- Region: Southeastern
- Municipality: Gevgelija

Population (2021)
  - Total: 312
- Time zone: UTC+1 (CET)
  - Summer (DST): UTC+2 (CEST)
- Website: .

Moin (Macedonian: Моин) is a village located in the Gevgelija Municipality of North Macedonia. It is located west of Geveglija, close to the Greek border.

== Demographics ==
As of the 2021 census, Moin had 312 residents with the following ethnic composition:

- Macedonians 300
- Serbs 5
- Persons for whom data are taken from administrative sources 5
- Aromanians - 1
- Others 1

According to the 2002 census, the village had a total of 317 inhabitants. Ethnic groups in the village include:

- Macedonians 298
- Serbs 16
- Aromanians 3
