= Kovanci =

Village in North Macedonia

Kovanci Кованци
- Village
- Location within North Macedonia
- Coordinates: 41.224490°N 22.414359°E
- Country: North Macedonia
- Region: Southeastern
- Municipality: Gevgelija

Population (2021)
  - Total: 149
- Time zone: UTC+1 (CET)
  - Summer (DST): UTC+2 (CEST)
- Website: .

Kovanci (Macedonian: Кованци) is a village located in the Gevgelija Municipality of North Macedonia. Its coordinates are 41° 13' 25" North 22° 25' 14" East.

== Demographics ==
According to the 2002 census, the village had a total of 177 inhabitants. Ethnic groups in the village include:

- Macedonians: 176
- Serbs: 1

A total of 149 residents inhabited the village of Kovanci as of 2021, and their ethnic composition was the following:

- Macedonians: 145
- People without documented data: 4
