= Stena (Macedonia) =

Coordinates: 41°22′42″N 22°24′17″E

Stena or Stenas was a station in ancient Macedonia, on the road from Tauriana (Doïrân) to Stobi, where the river Axius is closely bordered by perpendicular rocks, which in one place have been excavated for the road.

The site of Stena is tentatively located near modern Gradec, in North Macedonia.
