= Prdejci =

Village in North Macedonia

Prdejci Прдејци
- Village
- Location within North Macedonia
- Coordinates: 41.207838°N 22.500681°E
- Country: North Macedonia
- Region: Southeastern
- Municipality: Gevgelija

Population (20021)
  - Total: 462
- Time zone: UTC+1 (CET)
  - Summer (DST): UTC+2 (CEST)
- Website: .

Prdejci (Macedonian: Прдејци) is a village located in the Gevgelija Municipality of North Macedonia.

== Demographics ==
According to the 2002 census, the village had a total of 514 inhabitants. Ethnic groups in the village include:

- Macedonians 510
- Serbs 2
- Others 2

As of 2021, the village of Prdejci has 462 inhabitants and the ethnic composition was the following:

- Macedonians – 452
- Turks – 5
- Persons without data - 5

== Transport ==
The village is severed by Prdejci railway station, a small halt just east of the village, with two daily services to/from Skopje.
