= Gradec, Valandovo =

Gradec Градец
- Village
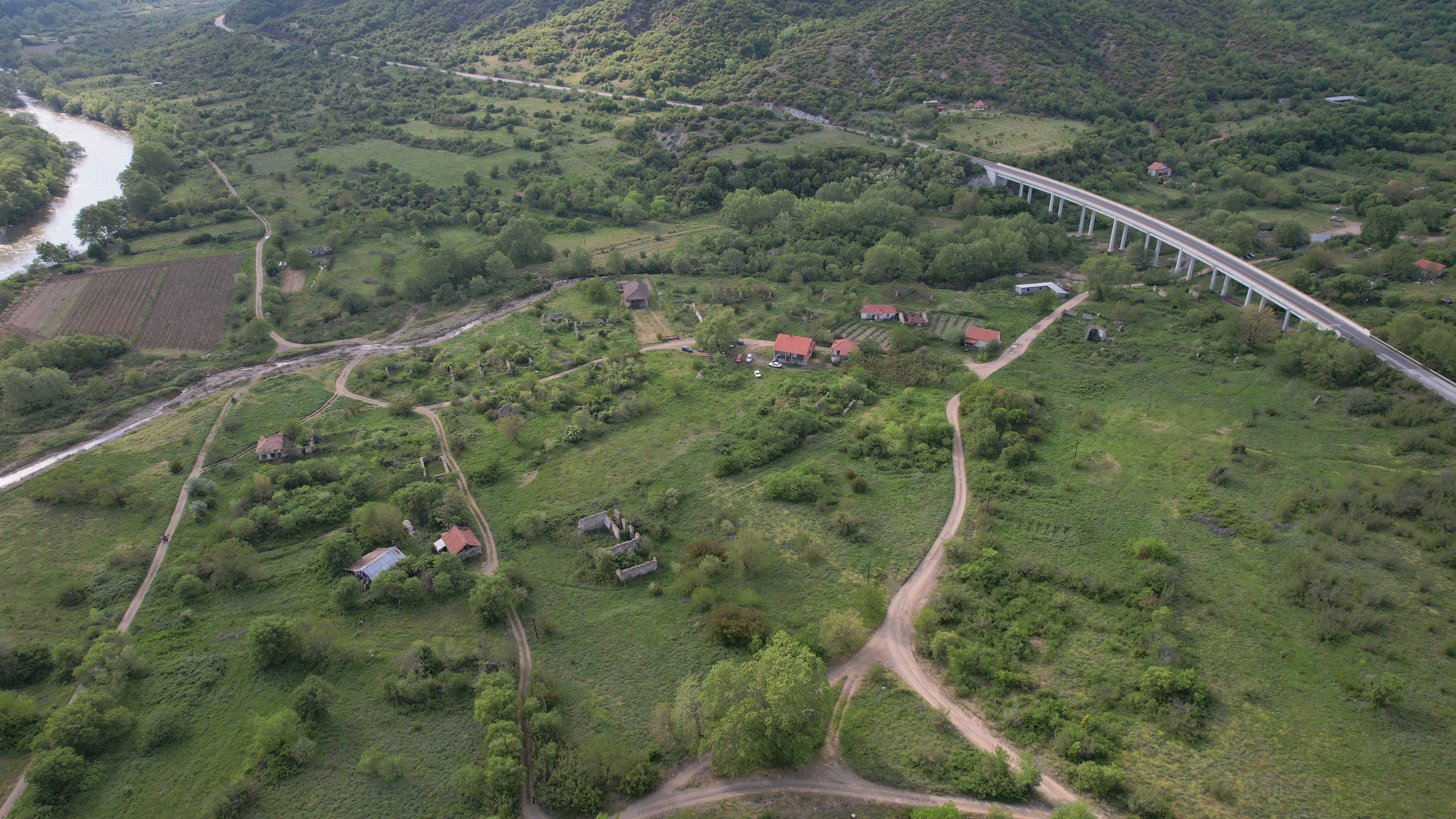
- Airview of the village

- Location within North Macedonia
- Country: North Macedonia
- Region: Southeastern
- Municipality: Valandovo

Population (2021)
  - Total: 3
- Time zone: UTC+1 (CET)
  - Summer (DST): UTC+2 (CEST)
- Website: .

Gradec (Macedonian: Градец) is a village in the municipality of Valandovo, North Macedonia. Nearby is the site of ancient Stena.

== Demographics ==
As of 2021, the village of Gradec has 3 inhabitants and the ethnic composition was the following:

- Macedonians – 3
