= Mrzenci =

Mrzenci Мрзенци
- Village
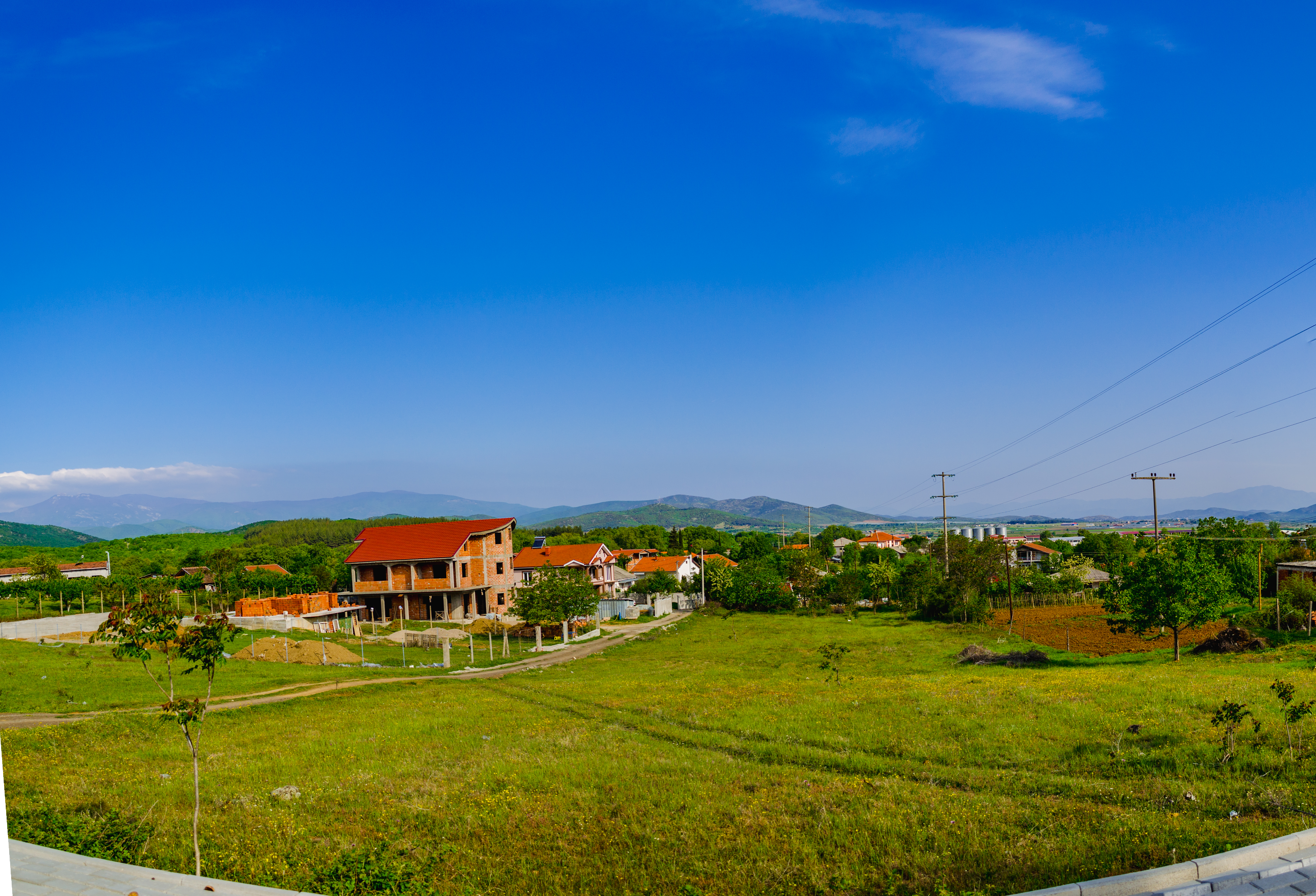

- Location within North Macedonia
- Country: North Macedonia
- Region: Southeastern
- Municipality: Gevgelija
- Elevation: 21 m (69 ft)

Population (2021)
  - Total: 525
- Time zone: UTC+1 (CET)
- Area code: +38934

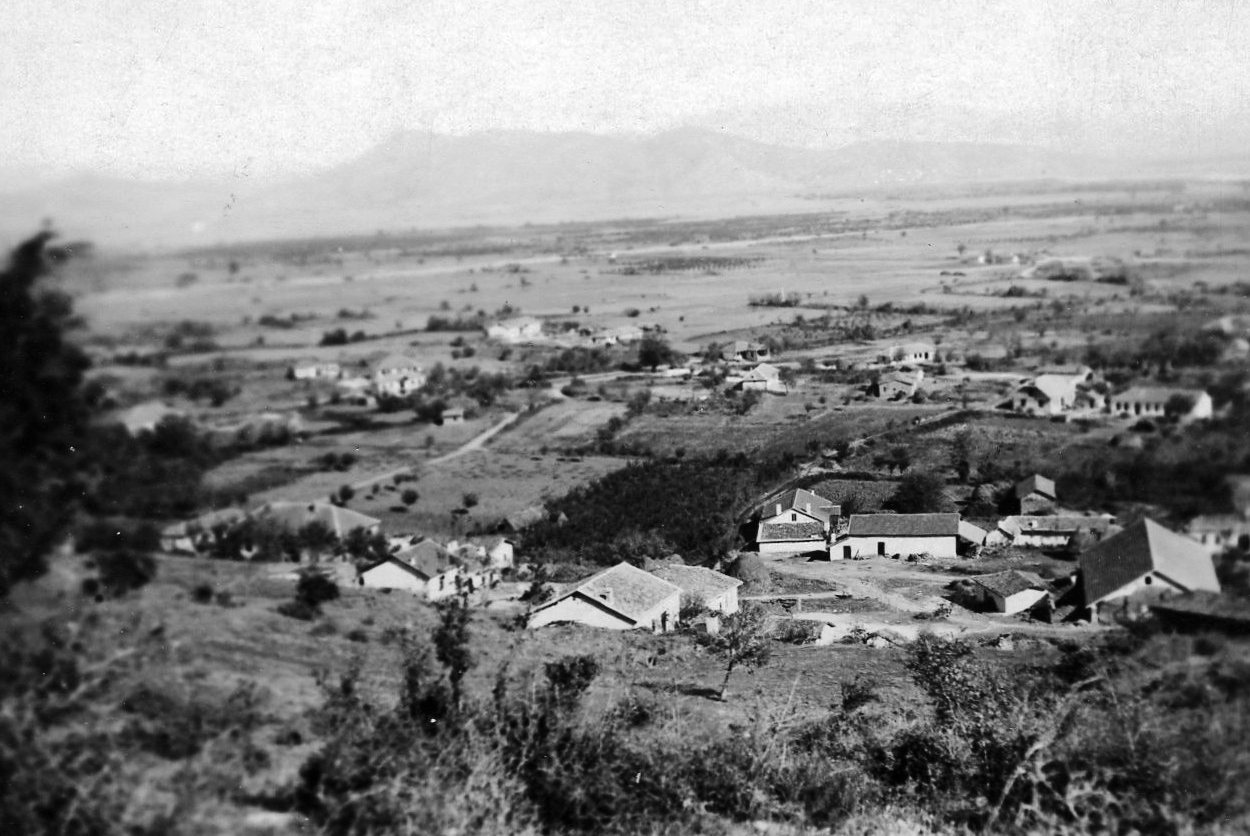
Photo of Mrzenci in the year 1931

Mrzenci (Macedonian: Мрзенци) is a village in Municipality of Gevgelija, North Macedonia.

== Demographics ==
As of the 2021 census, Mrzenci had 525 residents with the following ethnic composition:

- Macedonians 502
- Persons for whom data are taken from administrative sources 16
- Serbs 5
- Albanians 1
- Others 1

According to the 2002 census, the village had a total of 461 inhabitants. Ethnic groups in the village include:

- Macedonians 458
- Serbs 1
- Aromanians 1
- Others 1
