= Gevgelija Municipality =

Municipality of North Macedonia

Coordinates: 41.15°N 22.51°E

Municipality of Gevgelija Општина Гевгелија
- Urban municipality
- Flag Coat of arms

- Country: North Macedonia
- Region: Southeastern
- Municipal seat: Gevgelija

Government
  - Mayor: Andon Saramandov (VMRO-DPMNE)

Area
  - Total: 317 km^{2} (122 sq mi)

Population
  - Total: 21,582
- Time zone: UTC+1 (CET)
- Vehicle registration: GE

Gevgelija (Macedonian: Општина Гевгелија, Opština Gevgelija) is a municipality in the southern part of North Macedonia. Gevgelija is also the name of the town where the municipal seat is found. Gevgelija Municipality is part of the Southeastern Statistical Region.

== Geography ==
The municipality borders Kavadarci Municipality to the west, Demir Kapija Municipality to the northwest, Valandovo Municipality to the northeast, Bogdanci Municipality to the east, and Greece to the south. There is a spring named Smrdliva Voda 24 km from Gevgelija which is "famous for its mineral water and its healing properties for stomach and kidney diseases". Mount Kozuf overshadows the municipality in the evening, and is now the site of a ski resort.

== Industry ==
The Allchar deposit is located on the slopes of Mount Kozuf. In 2017, 13,100 residents out of 13,300 eligible voters in the municipality decided in a referendum against the permission of a gold mine operator that had hoped to exploit an area north-west of the city Gevgelija, along the Konjska river.

== Demographics ==
According to the 2021 North Macedonia census, Gevgelija Municipality has 21,582 inhabitants. Ethnic groups in the municipality include:

	2002		2021	
	Number	%	Number	%
TOTAL	22,988	100	21,582	100
Macedonians	22,258	96.82	19,778	91.64
Vlachs	214	0.93	266	1.23
Serbs	367	1.6	217	1.01
Turks	31	0.13	59	0.27
Roma	13	0.06	21	0.1
Albanians	8	0.03	20	0.09
Bosniaks	5	0.02	8	0.04
Other / Undeclared / Unknown	92	0.41	166	0.77
Persons for whom data are taken from administrative sources			1,047	4.85

== Inhabited places ==
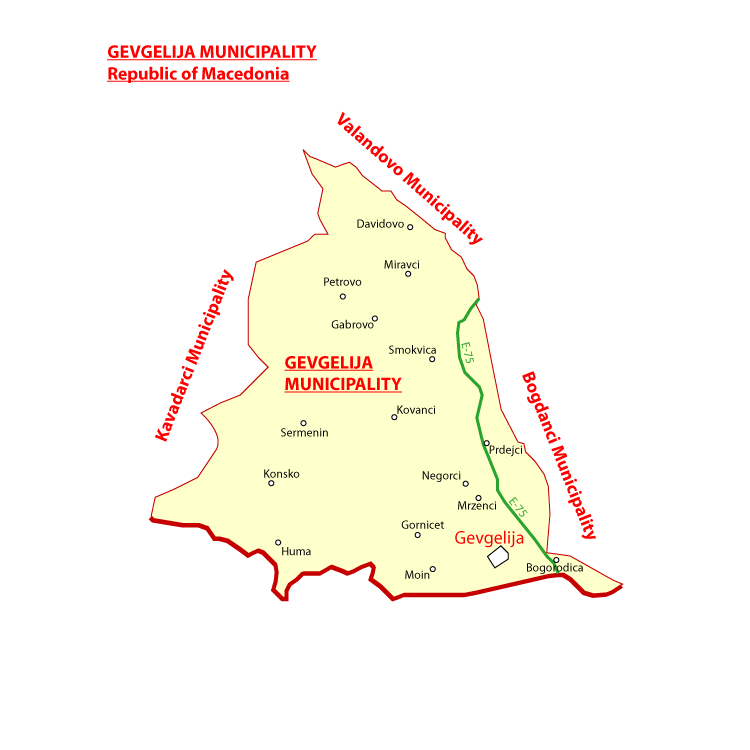
Gevgelija Municipality Map

There is a total of 17 inhabited places in the Gevgelija municipality. There is one town and 16 villages.

Inhabited places in Gevgelija Municipality
Village(s): Bogorodica | Davidovo | Gabrovo | Huma | Konsko | Kovanci | Miletkovo | Miravci | Moin | Mrzenci | Negorci | Novo Konsko | Petrovo | Prdejci | Sermerin | Smokvica Town: Gevgelija
