= Theodosia, Kilkis =

Mountain village in Greece

Theodosia Θεοδόσια
- Community
- Location within Greece
- Coordinates: 40°59′10.57″N 23°07′36.33″E
- Country: Greece
- Administrative region: Central Macedonia
- Regional unit: Kilkis
- Municipality: Kilkis
- Municipal unit: Kroussa
- Elevation: 680 m (2,230 ft)

Population (2021)
  - Community: 147
- Time zone: UTC+2 (EET)
  - Summer (DST): UTC+3 (EEST)
- Postal code: 57 200
- Area code: +30 23410
- Vehicle registration: ΚΙ

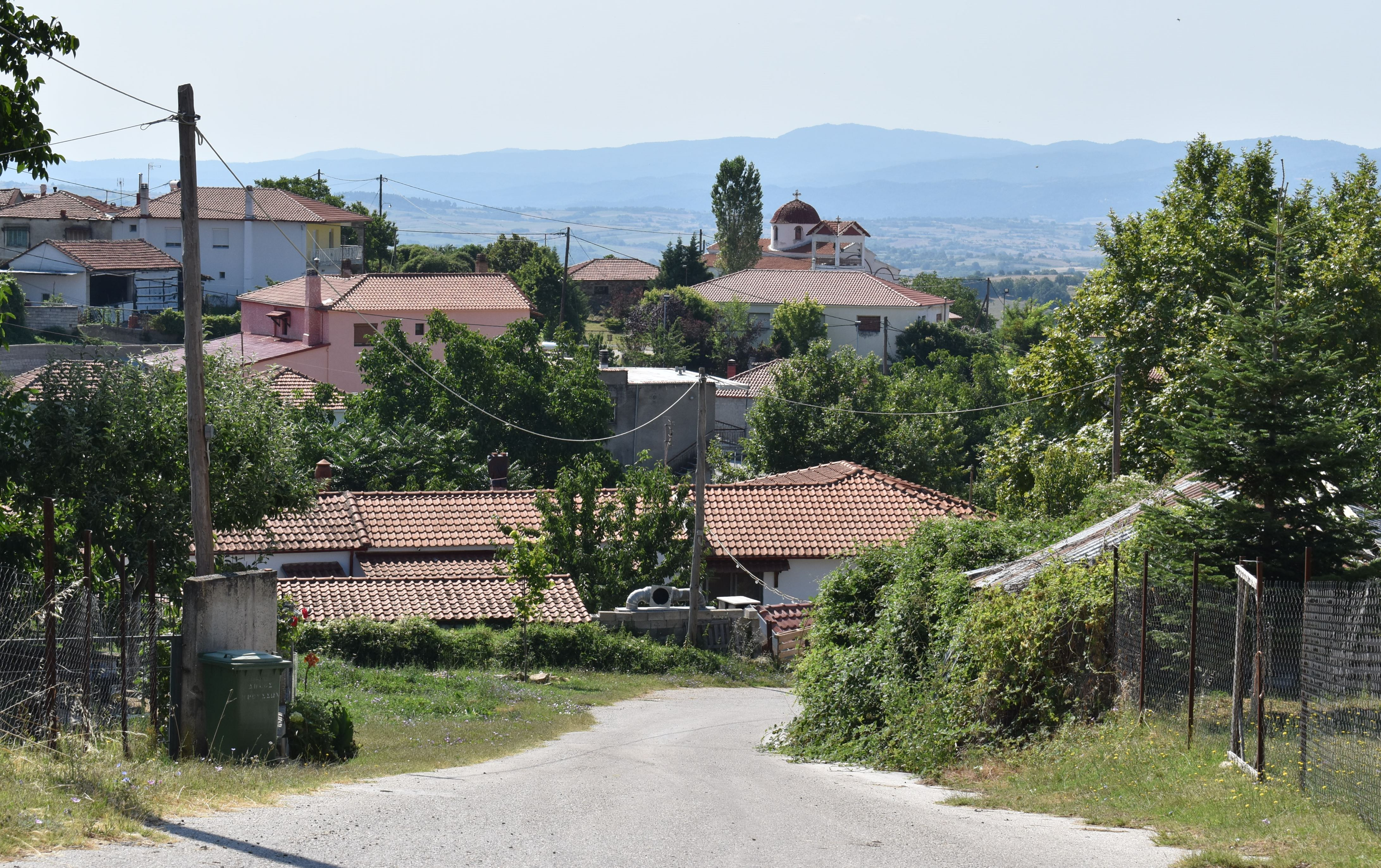
A street in Theodosia

Theodosia (Greek: Θεοδόσια) is a mountain village of Kilkis in Central Macedonia in altitude 680 meters, located on the slopes of Mount Mavrovouni (part of Kroussia Mountains ), located 28.5 km . D. of the city of Kilkis and 49.5 km NW-NE. of Thessaloniki . The old name of the village, from the time of Ottoman rule, was Hatzi Bairamli or Hatzimbairamli and it is mentioned in 1918 in the Government Gazette 152A-09/07/1918 that the seat of the homonymous community that belonged to the prefecture of Thessaloniki was defined . It was renamed Theodosia in 1927 and in 1935 was detached to the prefecture of Kilkis. According to the Kallikratis plan of 2010, it is the local community of Theodosia that belongs to the municipal unit of Kroussa of the municipality of Kilkis. According to the 2021 census the community has a population of 147 permanent residents.
