= Bogorodica, Gevgelija =

Village in North Macedonia

Bogorodica Богородица
- Village
- Location within North Macedonia
- Coordinates: 41.140358°N 22.549224°E
- Country: North Macedonia
- Region: Southeastern
- Municipality: Gevgelija

Population (2021)
  - Total: 896
- Time zone: UTC+1 (CET)
  - Summer (DST): UTC+2 (CEST)
- Website: .

Bogorodica (Macedonian: Богородица) is a village located in the Gevgelija Municipality of North Macedonia.

== Demographics ==
According to the 2002 census, the village had a total of 1001 inhabitants. Ethnic groups in the village include:

- Macedonians 975
- Serbs 18
- Aromanians 7
- others 1

As of 2021, the village of Bogorodica has 896 inhabitants and the ethnic composition was the following:

- Macedonians 861
- Turks 1
- Aromanians 1
- Serbs 1
- others 3
- Person without Data 29
