= Bansko, North Macedonia =

Village in North Macedonia

Coordinates: 41°23′N 22°45′E

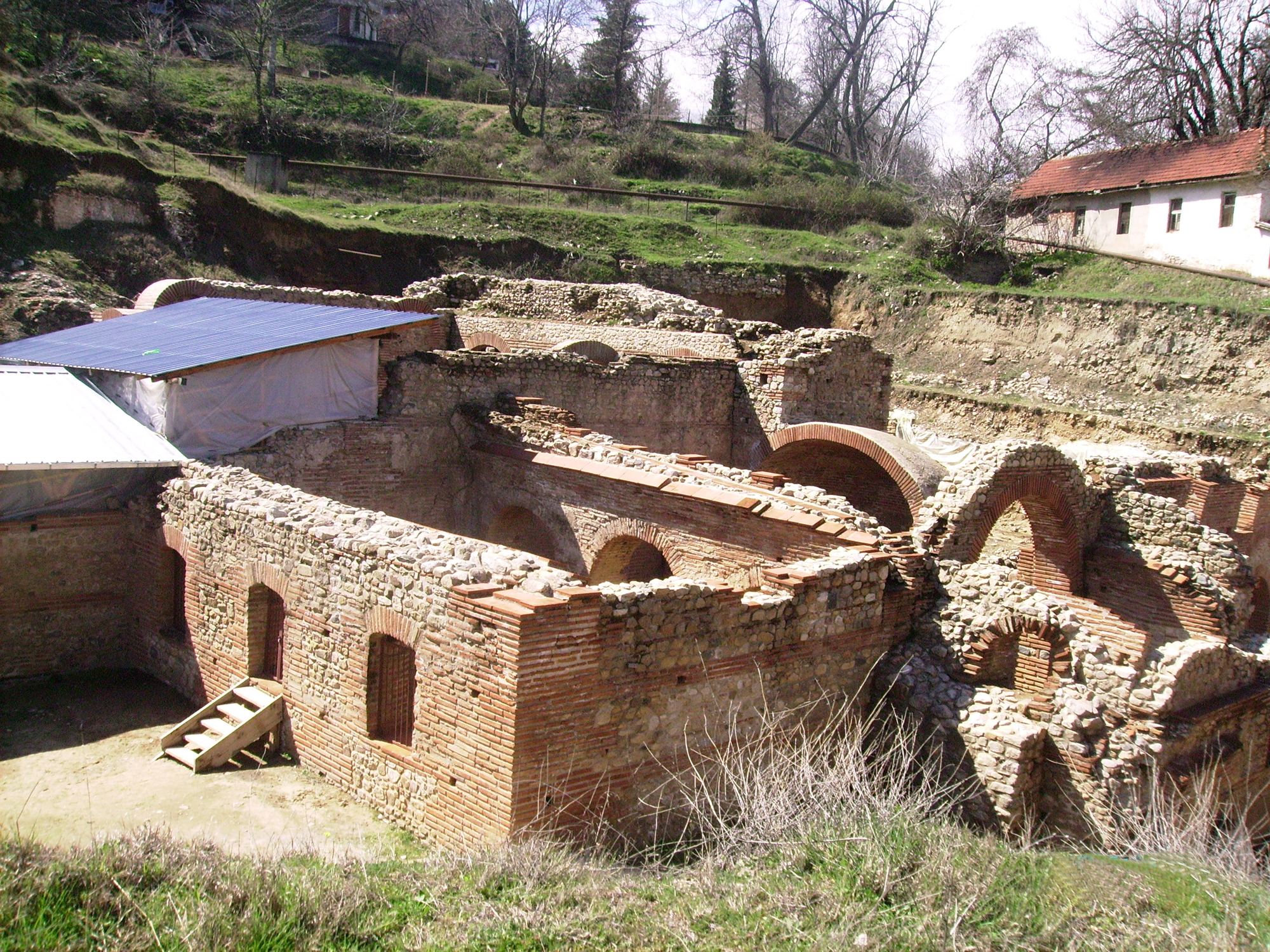
Roman baths near Bansko, Republic of Macedonia

Bansko (Банско in Macedonian) is a village in North Macedonia. It is situated in the Strumica Plain, near the Belasica range. It is known for the Bansko spa.

The ancient site of Doberus is located nearby.

== Population ==
As of North Macedonia's 2021 census, Bansko had 2,414 residents, with the following ethnic composition:

- Turks: 1,142
- Macedonians: 827
- Albanians: 2
- Romani: 2
- Persons for whom data are taken from administrative sources: 434
- Others: 7
