= Marvinci =

Marvinci Марвинци
- Village
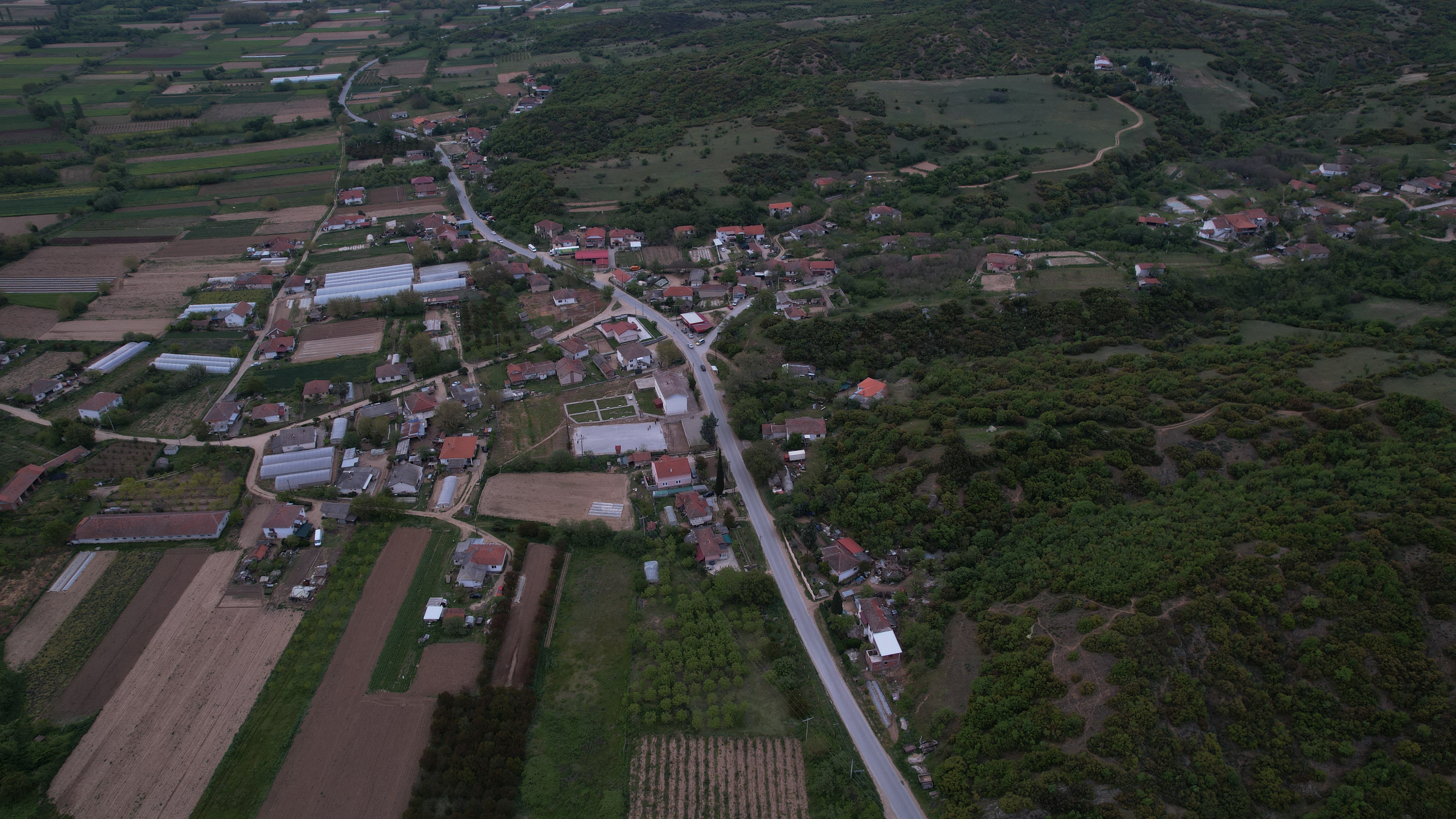
- Air view of the village

- Location within North Macedonia
- Country: North Macedonia
- Region: Southeastern
- Municipality: Valandovo

Population (2002)
  - Total: 504
- Time zone: UTC+1 (CET)
  - Summer (DST): UTC+2 (CEST)
- Website: .

Marvinci (Macedonian and Serbian Cyrillic: Марвинци) is a village in the Valandovo municipality, in the southeastern part of North Macedonia.

== Geography ==
Marvinci is located in the southeast of the country, some 8 km from the nearest town, also the municipal seat, Valandovo. The village is located in the historical region of Bojmija, in the valley of the Vardar, near 70 m above sea level. The surroundings of the village is plain and fertile agricultural area.

The climate is humid continental, with notable influence of the Aegean (hot summers).

== Population ==
According to the 2002 census, the village had a total of 504 inhabitants, out of which a majority declared as Serbs (56%), the rest as Macedonians (44%). The predominant religion of the population is Eastern Orthodoxy.

As of 2021, the village of Marvinci has 437 inhabitants and the ethnic composition was the following:

- Serbs - 215
- Macedonians – 196
- Albanians – 2
- Turks – 1
- Bosniaks - 1
- others – 1
- Person without Data - 21
