= Tauriana (Greece) =

Coordinates: 40°59′47″N 22°43′32″E

Tauriana (Ancient Greek: Ταυρίανα) was a town of ancient Macedonia, inhabited during the Hellenistic and Roman periods.

The site of Tauriana is tentatively located near modern Chorigi.
