= Miravci =

Miravci Миравци
- Village
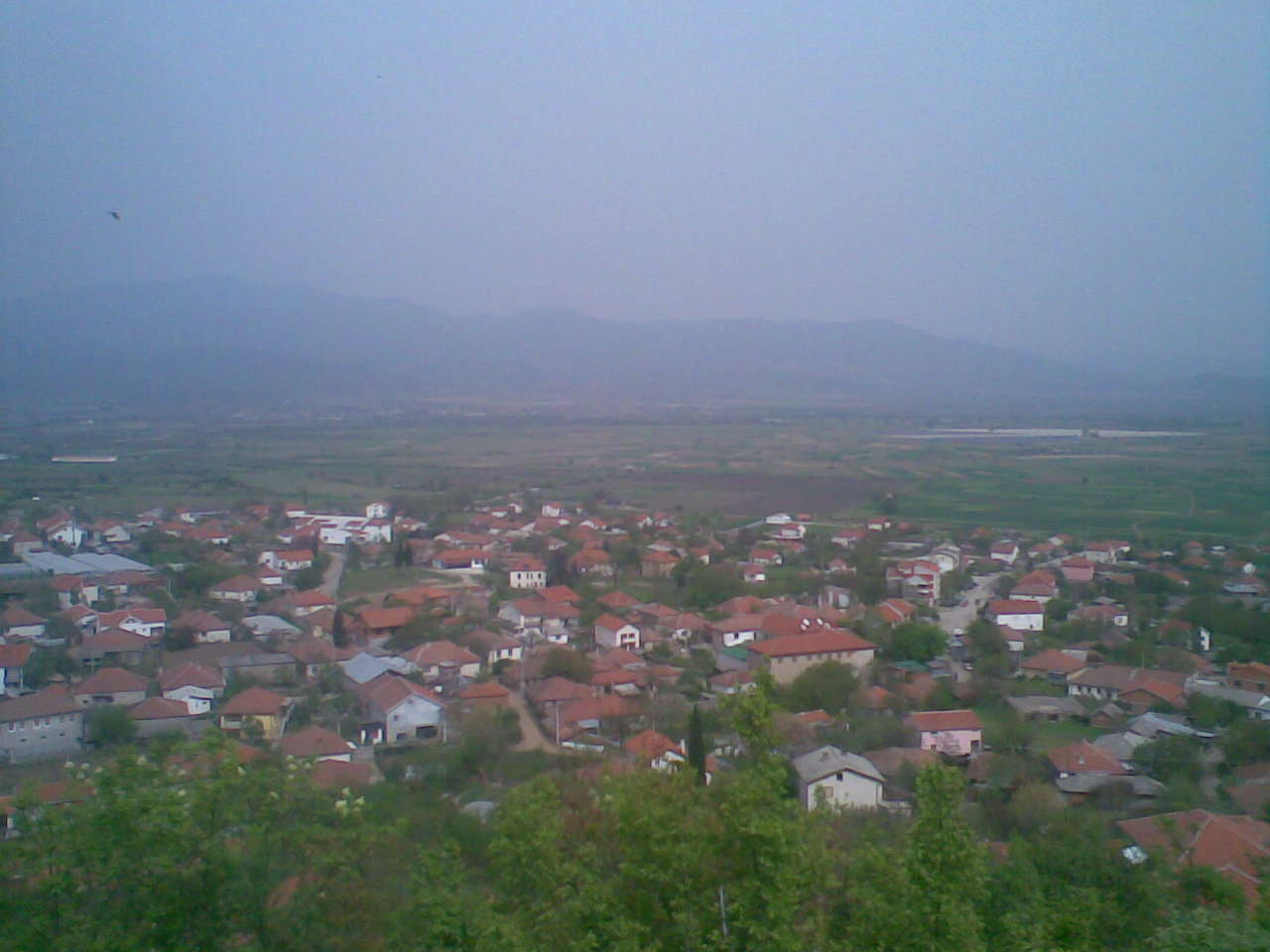
- A view of Miravci.

- Location within North Macedonia
- Coordinates: 41°18′28″N 22°26′05″E
- Country: North Macedonia
- Region: Southeastern
- Municipality: Gevgelija

Population (2021)
  - Total: 1,392
- Time zone: UTC+1 (CET)
  - Summer (DST): UTC+2 (CEST)

Miravci (Macedonian: Миравци) is a village in the Gevgelija region of south-eastern part of North Macedonia, located in the Kožuf foothills west of the Vardar River.

Miravci lies on the Skopje-Thessaloniki railway and a few kilometers from the once-named Highway of Brotherhood and Unity that ran the whole length of Yugoslavia. It is about 25 kilometers north of the Greek border.

Miravci has at various times in recent decades been its own municipality, or folded into the greater Gevgelija municipality. There are six villages in the Miravci district: Miravci, Davidovo, Petrovo, Gabrovo, Miletkovo and Smokvica. Miravci has a kindergarten and grade school (St. Kliment Ohridski, grades 1–8) that serve students from all six villages. The entire municipality has around 2900 residents.

Miravci has a warm, Mediterranean climate and is known for its tomatoes, peppers and other early-season vegetables. The hills around the region are covered in Quercus coccifera (Kermes oak -- 'prnar' in Macedonian), as well as wild figs and pomegranates.

Some notable people who come from Miravci include Angel Dobardziev, a telecoms analysts and consulting director

== History ==
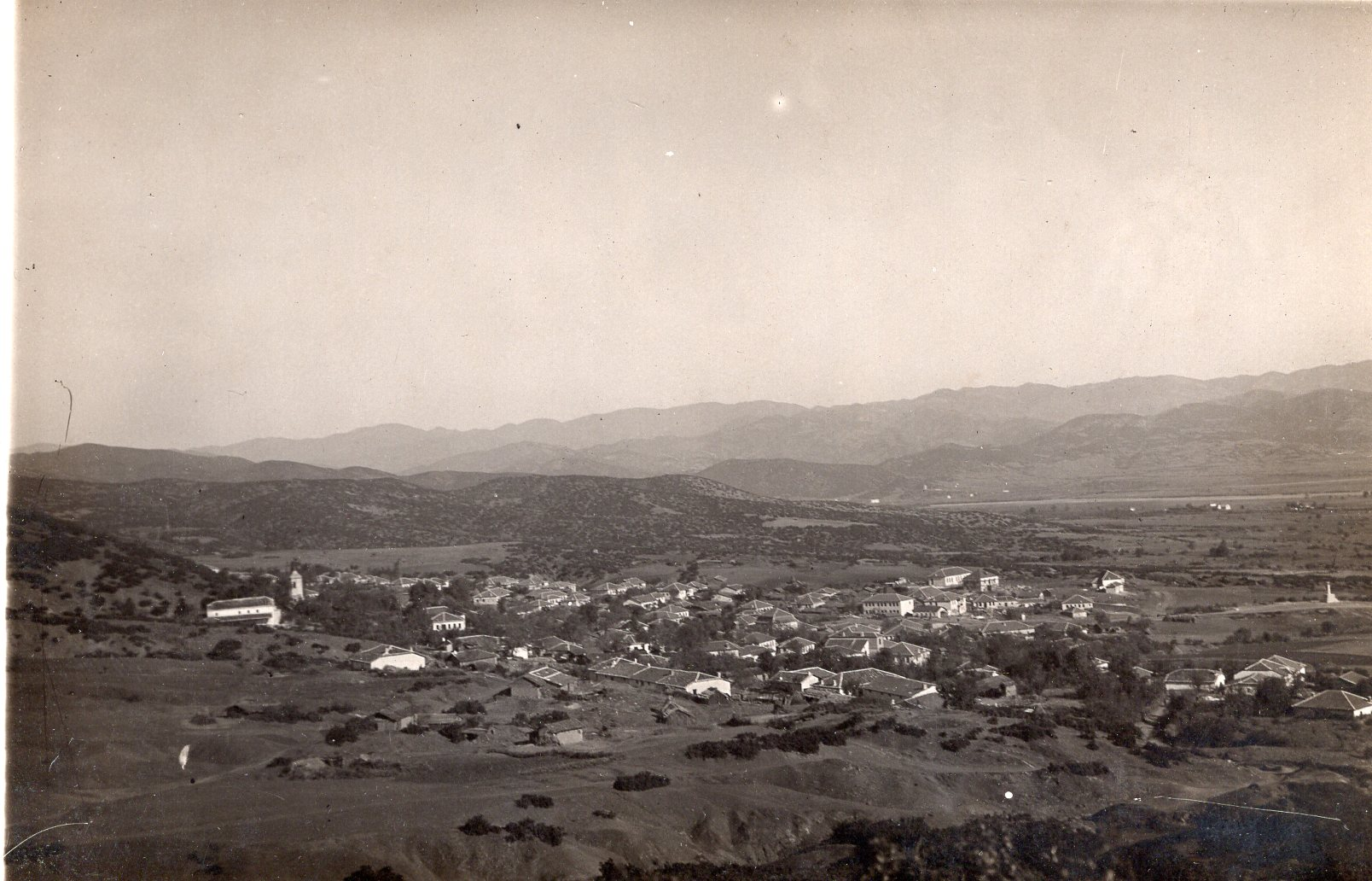
Miravci, photo from 1931

Miravci is a rather old village, although the area has long been inhabited. One of the most famous landmarks is the "White Bridge" located a few kilometers west on the Old River. It is sometimes called the "Roman bridge" although it was most likely built during the Ottoman Empire's occupation. Near the bridge an archeological site known as Markovi kuli (Markov's towers) has been excavated. Above the village of Davidovo is a small church known as the monastery St. Ilija (Elijah) -- a prominent local landmark seen from the highway.

Petrovo village is considered the oldest settlement in the district. Many of the villagers were said to have fled from the Turkish army several centuries ago to form an old village called Petrovo (now Agios Petros) in modern-day Greece.

The scrub-covered hills of the district have long lured both hunters and rebels to their cover. Anti-Ottoman komiti bands and later anti-Fascist partisan bands operated there. The Nazi German army burned the villages of Petrovo and nearby Gabrovo in October 1944.

== Etymology ==
There are several tales regarding the origin of the name "Miravci". According to one, the village used to be located higher up in the hills, and was forced to relocate after a particularly bad infestation of insects ("mravi" means "ants" in Macedonian). The village relocated to a more peaceful ("mirno") place.

A second tale relates that five brothers: Miro, David, Peter, Gabriel and Mile moved to the area and founded the five villages: Miravci, Davidovo, Petrovo, Gabrovo and Miletkovo.

The Gjura Mara celebration is unique to Miravci. This dance always takes place on the Tuesday after Orthodox Easter. It is a circle dance performed by the older women of the village. Inside the circle a young girl of the village dances with a staff. Around the circle young lads wearing Turkish fez hats try to break into the circle to get to the girl, who chases them off with a stick. The dance originates in a local tale of a girl Mara who was kidnapped by a Turkish pasha for his harem—her brother Gjuro made a daring foray to rescue her.

The local dialect is similar to the southeastern Macedonian language dialects of Gevgelija-Strumica in general, with some diversions. These dialects differ from standard Macedonian in their use of penultimate and ultimate word stress (compared to the standard dialect's antepenultimate stress) as well as some vocabulary and grammatical differences (such as the use of -h as the past tense verb marker in the first person singular, as opposed to -v in standard dialect). Word-final vowels are often dropped when the definite-article suffix is added: glava - 'head' --> glav'ca - 'the head'.

== Demographics ==
According to the 2002 census, the former municipality had a population of 2,626 and the village had a total of 1,647 inhabitants. Ethnic groups in the village include:

- Macedonians 1640
- Serbs 6
- Others 1

As of 2021, the village of Мiravci had 1,392 inhabitants and the ethnic composition was the following:

- Macedonians 1.335
- Albanians 5
- Serbs 2
- others 8
- Person without Data 42
