= Gevgelija =

Town in south-east of North Macedonia

Gevgelija Гевгелија (Macedonian)
- Town
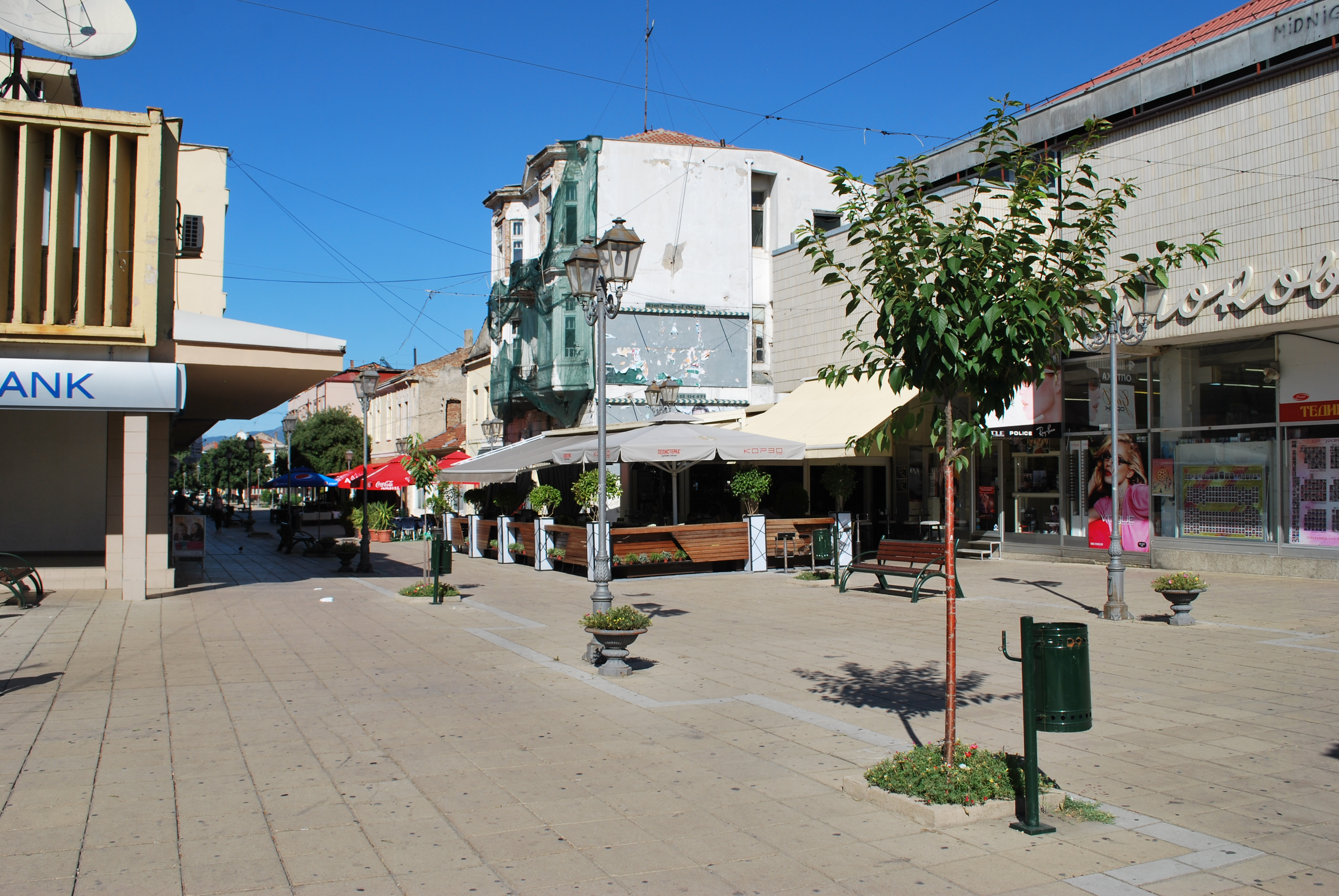
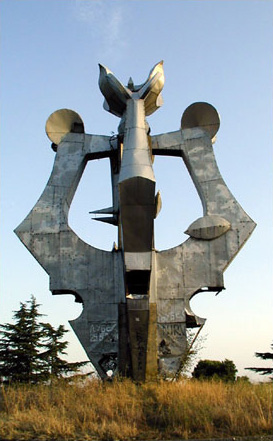
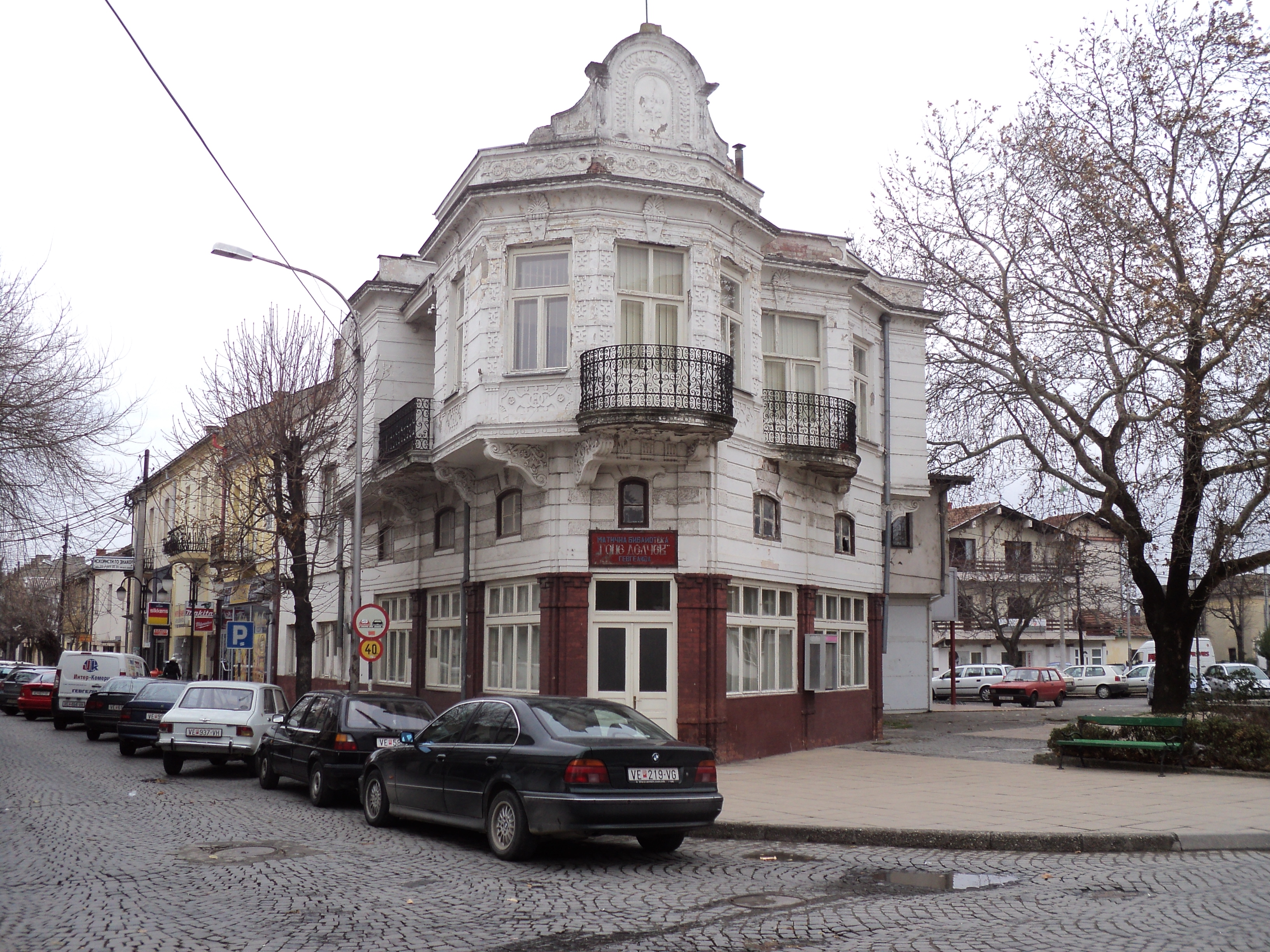
- From the top, Town Centre, Flower of Freedom Monument, Goce Delčev City Library

- Flag Coat of arms
- Nickname: Macedonian Las Vegas
- Location within North Macedonia
- Coordinates: 41°8′44″N 22°29′58″E
- Country: North Macedonia
- Region: Southeastern
- Municipality: Gevgelija

Government
  - Mayor: Andon Saramandov (VMRO-DPMNE)
- Elevation: 64 m (210 ft)

Population (2002)
  - Total: 15,685
- Time zone: UTC+1 (CET)
  - Summer (DST): UTC+2 (CEST)
- Postal code: 1480
- Area code: +389 34
- Vehicle registration: GE
- Website: Official Website

Gevgelija (Macedonian: Гевгелија; [ɟɛvˈɟɛlija]) is a border town located in the very southeast of North Macedonia along the banks of the Vardar River, situated at the country's main border crossing with Greece (Bogorodica-Evzoni), the point which links the motorway from Skopje and three regional capitals, Belgrade, Zagreb, and Sofia with Thessaloniki in Greece. The town is the seat of the Gevgelija Municipality.

== Name ==
In Macedonian the town is called Gevgelija (Гевгелија). In other languages, it is known as Yevyeli (Γευγελή) in Greek, Gevgeli (Гевгели) in Bulgarian, Đevđelija (Ђевђелија, IPA: [dʑeʋdʑělija]) in Serbian and Gevgeli in Turkish. Furthermore, in Megleno-Romanian, the city is known as Ghivgheliia.

Gevgelija is known as the "Balkan Las Vegas" for its wide number of casinos.

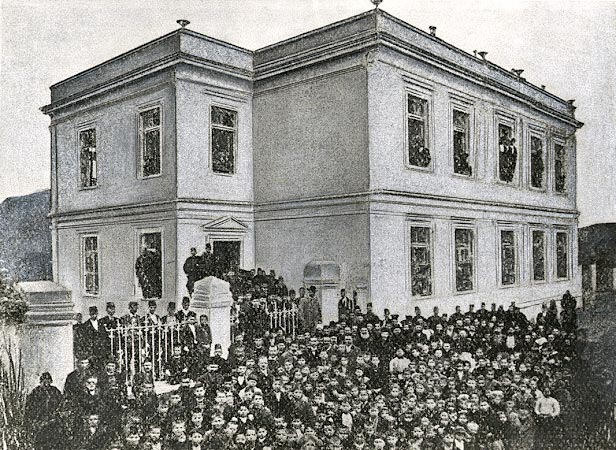
The Greek Tsouflidion School of Gevgeli

== History ==
In the late 19th and early 20th century, Gevgelija was part of the Salonica Vilayet of the Ottoman Empire. According to the statistics of the French geographer Alexandre Synvet, the town had a total Christian population of 290 families (1.740 people) in 1878, consisting of 35 Bulgarian Christian ones and 255 Greek Christian families. The town had also 4 Greek schools. According to Bulgarian Exarchate secretary Dimitar Mishev (D. M. Brancoff), in 1905 the town had a population of 4,375 Christians, consisting of 2.240 Patriarchist Bulgarians (Grecomans), 1.840 Exarchist Bulgarians, 80 Serbian Patriarchist Bulgarians (Serbomans), 8 Uniat Bulgarians, 90 Roma people, 72 Vlachs (Megleno-Romanians), 30 Albanians and 15 Greeks.

From 1929 to 1941, Gevgelija was part of the Vardar Banovina of the Kingdom of Yugoslavia.

== Transport ==
The town is served by Gevgelija railway station, outside the city limits on its eastern edge.

== Demographics ==
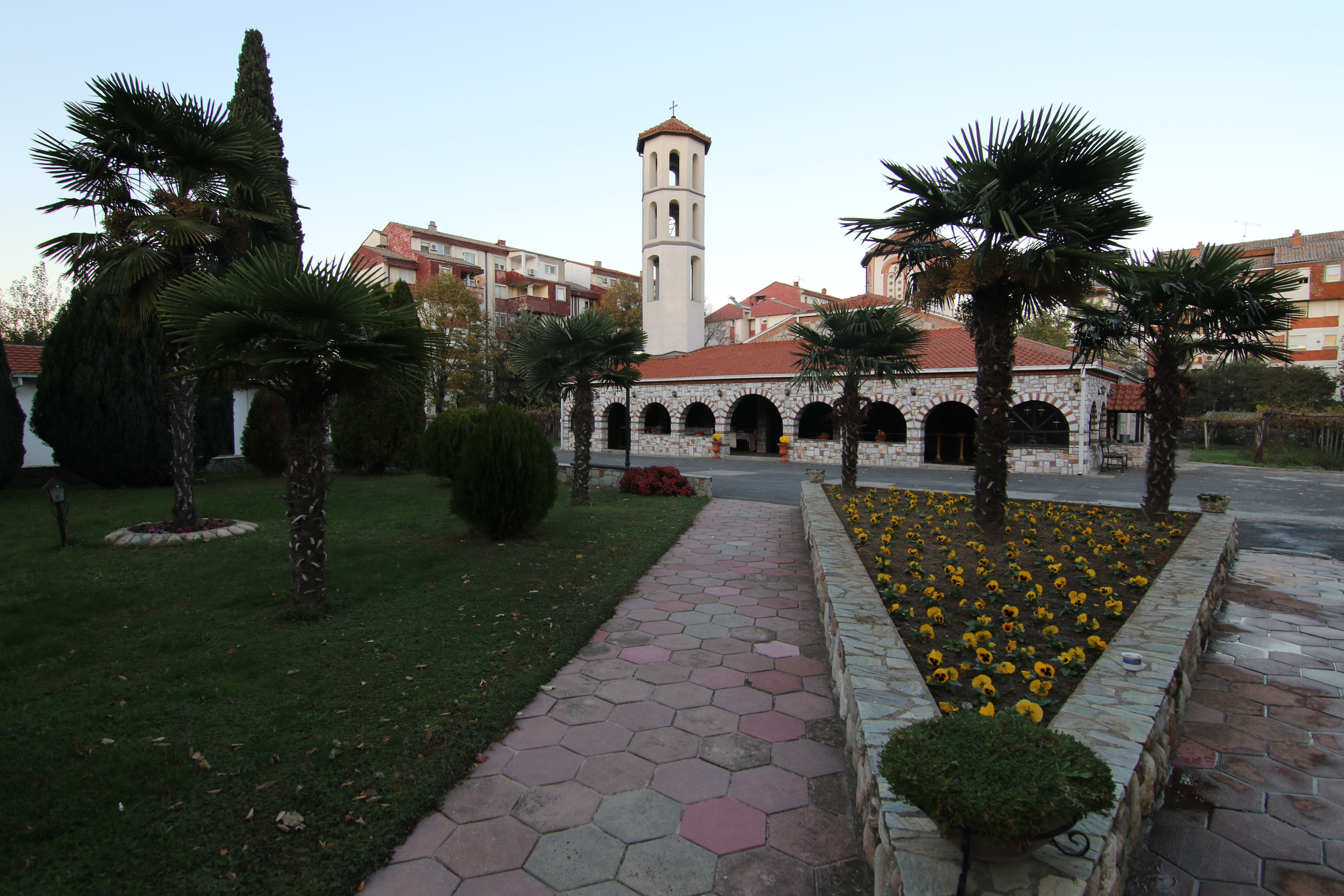
Church of the Ascension of Jesus

According to the 2002 census, the town of Gevgelija had 15,685 residents, most of whom were ethnic Macedonians.

Ethnic group	Number
Macedonians	15,060 (96.22%)
Serbs	292 (1.9%)
Vlachs (Megleno-Romanians)	201 (1.3%)
Others	132 (0.8%)
Total	15,685

As of 2021, the town of Gevgelija has 15,156 inhabitants and the ethnic composition was the following:

- Macedonians – 13,621
- Aromanians – 260
- Serbs – 196
- Turks – 53
- Romani – 21
- Albanians – 8
- Bosniaks – 8
- others – 134
- Person without Data – 855

== Geography ==
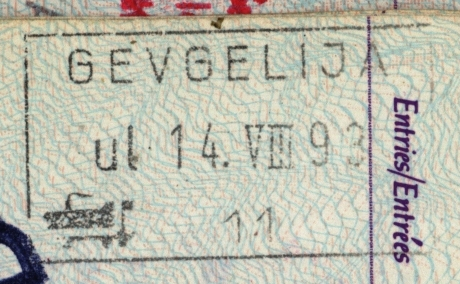
Gevgelija former passport stamp.

Located between the mountains Kožuf and Pajak only 70 kilometres (43 miles) from Thessaloniki and 165 km (103 mi) from Skopje, the town acts as a rail depot between the two countries, making it a central location in its region. Its position in the southeast of the country gives it a warm Mediterranean climate (Csa classification), making it the optimal location in North Macedonia for cultivation of fruits and vegetables such as figs, lemons, and grapes. The town is also a centre for raising silkworms, an integral part of the country's silk trade. Alongside its agriculture, Gevgelija's economy consists of a light industry sector. Tourism is growing, with a spa located in a nearby village.

=== Climate ===
Gevgelija has a hot-summer mediterranean climate (Köppen climate classification: Csa), making it one of North Macedonia's warmer towns.

Climate data for Gevgelija
Month	Jan	Feb	Mar	Apr	May	Jun	Jul	Aug	Sep	Oct	Nov	Dec	Year
Mean daily maximum °C (°F)	9.6 (49.3)	11.3 (52.3)	16.4 (61.5)	20.8 (69.4)	26.7 (80.1)	31.9 (89.4)	35.0 (95.0)	35.2 (95.4)	30.1 (86.2)	23.0 (73.4)	15.3 (59.5)	10.6 (51.1)	22.2 (71.9)
Daily mean °C (°F)	3.1 (37.6)	5.7 (42.3)	11.4 (52.5)	15.7 (60.3)	20.5 (68.9)	25.8 (78.4)	28.0 (82.4)	27.9 (82.2)	23.1 (73.6)	17.7 (63.9)	10.3 (50.5)	5.1 (41.2)	16.2 (61.2)
Mean daily minimum °C (°F)	1.4 (34.5)	3.2 (37.8)	7.4 (45.3)	10.1 (50.2)	15.5 (59.9)	19.8 (67.6)	21.5 (70.7)	21.2 (70.2)	18.5 (65.3)	13.4 (56.1)	8.4 (47.1)	2.6 (36.7)	11.9 (53.5)
Average precipitation mm (inches)	33 (1.3)	33 (1.3)	37 (1.5)	35 (1.4)	50 (2.0)	26 (1.0)	19 (0.7)	15 (0.6)	28 (1.1)	40 (1.6)	53 (2.1)	45 (1.8)	414 (16.4)
Source: Climate-Data.org

== Sports ==
Local football club FK Kožuf have played in the Macedonian First Football League.

== International relations ==
=== Twin towns – Sister cities ===
Gevgelija is twinned with:

- Sevlievo, Bulgaria
- Inđija, Serbia
- Sežana, Slovenia
- Kotka, Finland

== Gallery ==
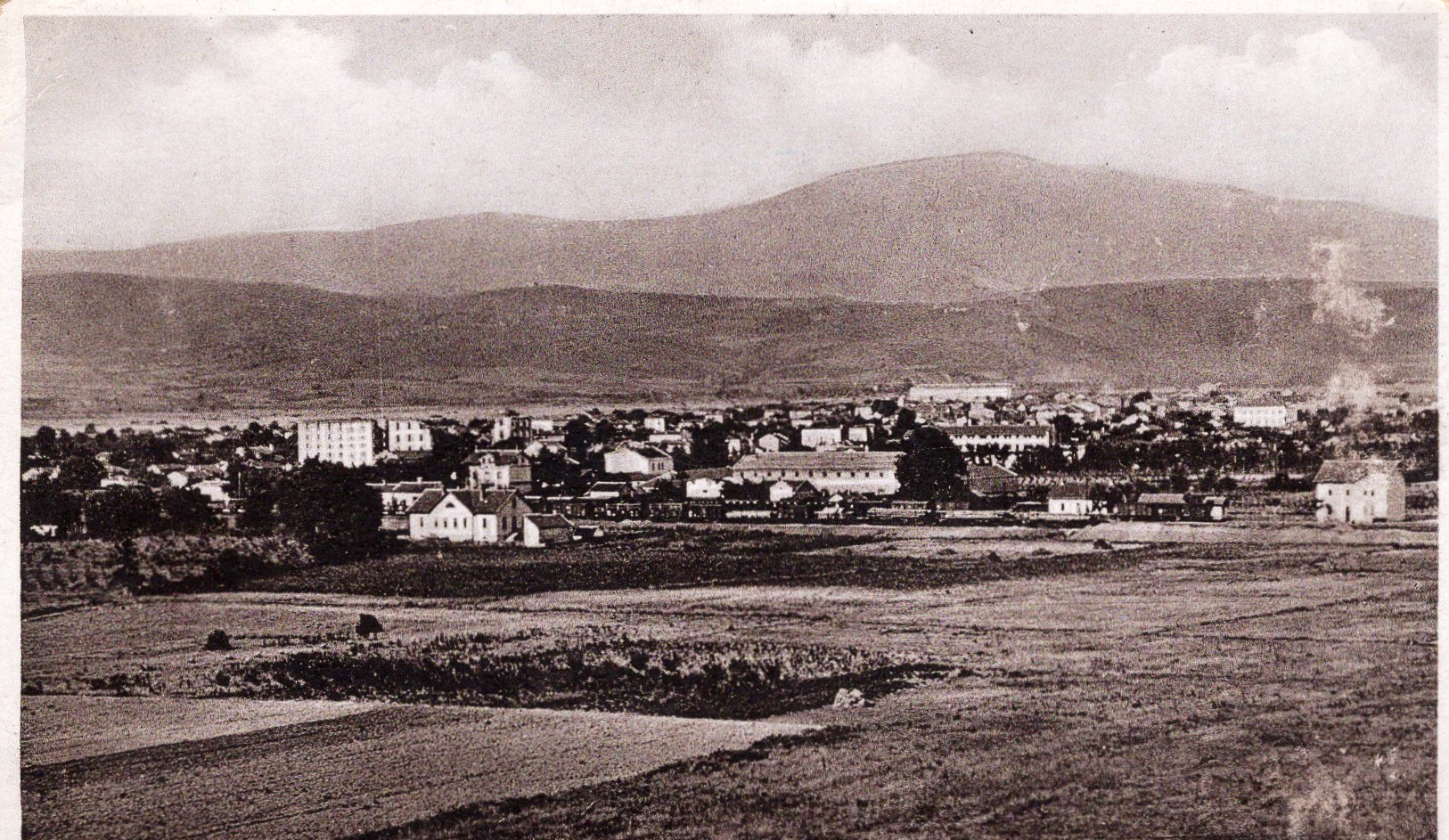
Postcard of Gevgelija, 1930s

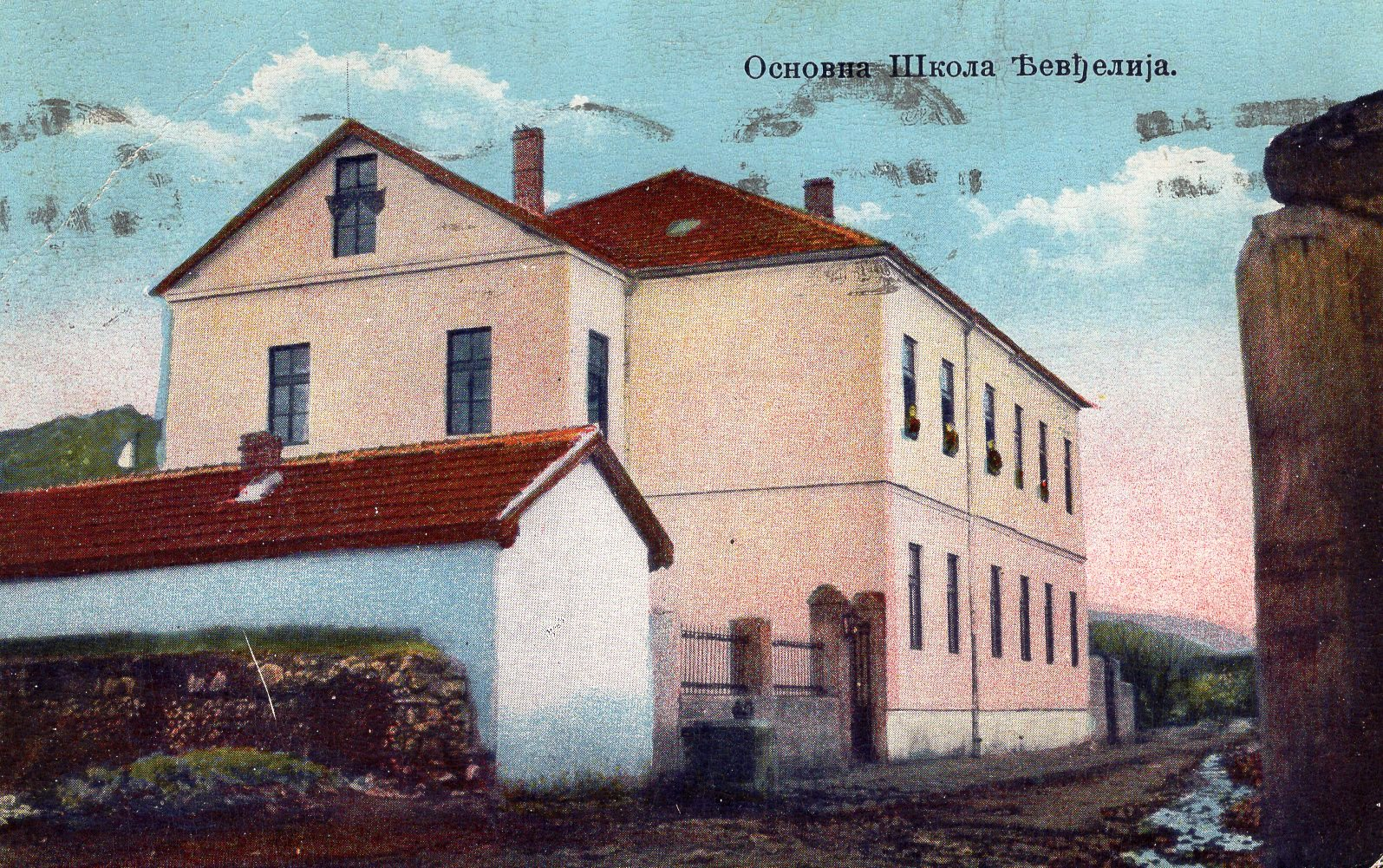
Postcard of Gevgelija, Primary School in 1930s

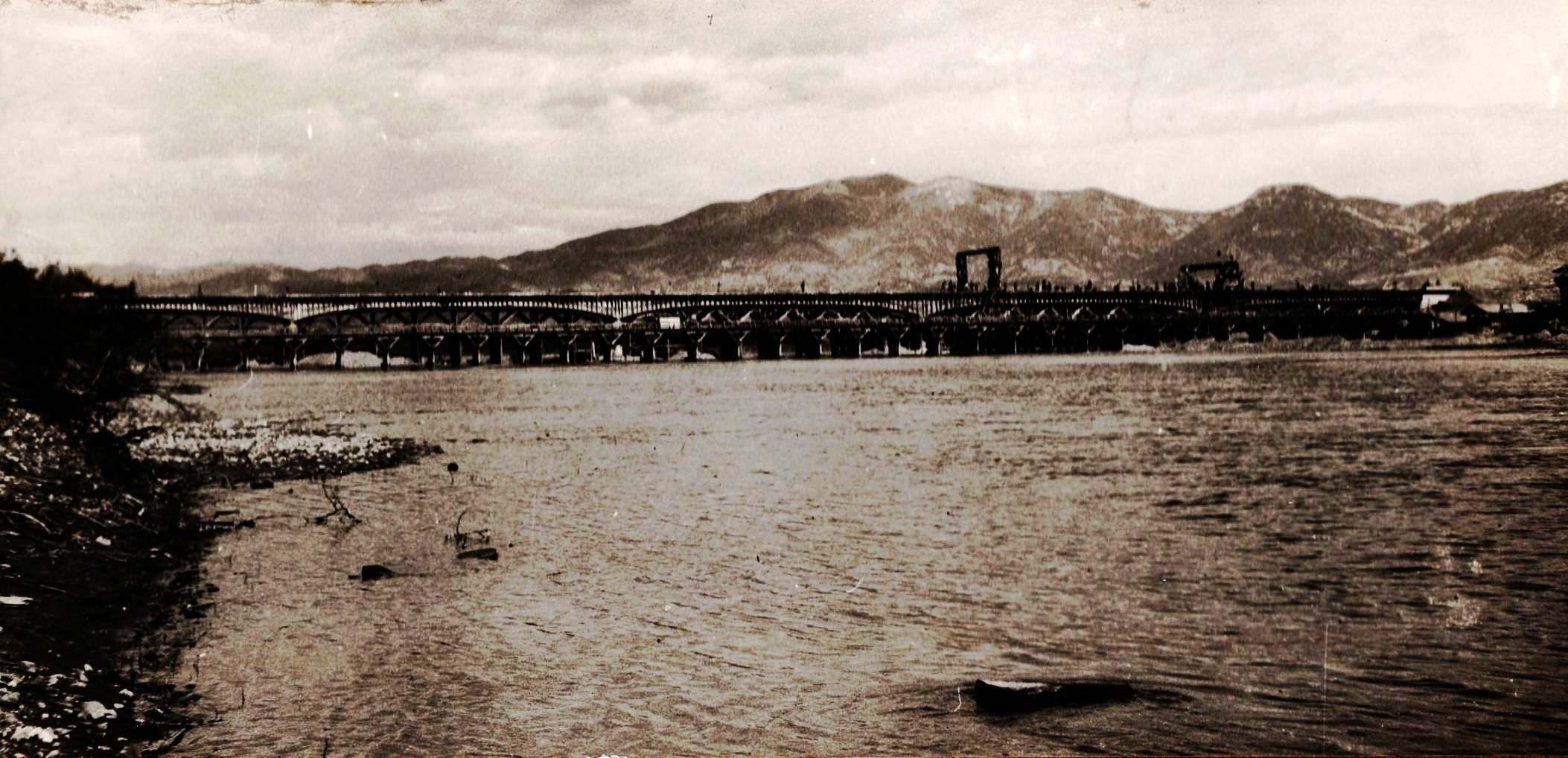
The construction of the bridge near Malosiste, Gevgelija. The bridge connects the motorway Ljubljana-Gevgelija (1950s).

== See also ==
- Vardarski Rid
