= Mariovo =

Region of North Macedonia

Topography of North Macedonia

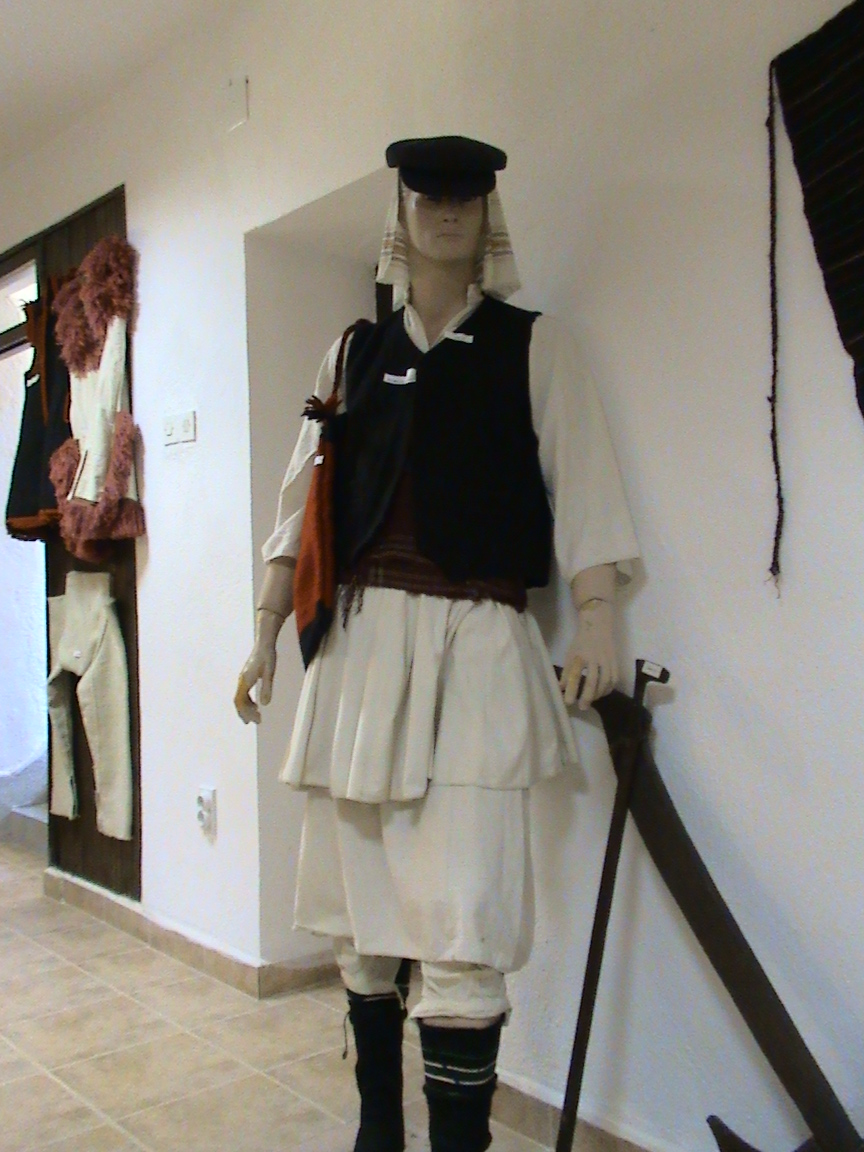
Mariovo traditional man's clothes

Mariovo (Macedonian: Мариово) is a historic region in the southern part of North Macedonia, with an area of 1,390 square km and an elevation 1,050 m, situated among mountains.

== Geography ==
=== Mountains ===
- Selečka (highest peak - Visoka 1,471 m) on the west,
- Nidže (highest peak - Kajmakčalan 2,520 m) and Kožuf (highest peak - Zelenbreg 2,171 m) on the south,
- Kozjak (highest peak - Baltova Čuka 1,822 m) on the east and
- Dren (highest peak - Studenica 1,663 m) on the north.

The river Crna flows across the whole area of Mariovo, creating the largest canyon in North Macedonia which is around 100 km long.

=== Sub-regions ===
The region is divided into three sub-regions,

- Bitolsko Mariovo (with its center Staravina)
- Prilepsko Mariovo (with its center Vitolište) and
- Tikveško Mariovo (consisted of the western parts of the former municipality Konopište with the villages of Rožden, Majdan, Ržanovo and Klinovo).

Nowadays, administratively it is divided among three municipalities:

- Prilep,
- Novaci and
- Kavadarci

The river Crna also divides the region into two sub-regions,

- Small Mariovo (Malo Mariovo) on the left side of the river, and
- Old (Large) Mariovo (Staro Mariovo) on the right side of the river.

== Environment ==
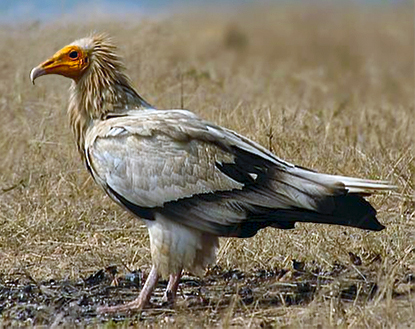
Some 4–5 pairs of Endangered Egyptian vultures nest in the IBA

The specific position and natural condition of this geomorphological entity have contributed towards creation of a distinct local climate which differs from the other parts of the country. The mountains Dren and Selečka shield Mariovo from the continental northern winds. On the south-east the basin of the river Crna enables Mediterranean influences from Aegean Sea, while in the area of Skočivir Ravine the moderate continental clime makes its way from the Pelagonian plains. The influence of three climate zones can be felt in this area.

=== Important Bird Area ===
A 65,500 ha tract, encompassing arable land, forest, shrubland and woodland, has been designated an Important Bird Area (IBA) by BirdLife International because it supports populations of rock partridges, Egyptian vultures, short-toed snake-eagles, golden eagles, lesser kestrels, lanner falcons, eastern subalpine warblers, western rock nuthatches, eastern black-eared wheatears and black-headed buntings.

== Settlement ==
More people lived there, but due to migration there are fewer than 1,000 inhabitants left in the 28 settlements: Vitolište, Bešište, Veprčani, Vrpsko, Dunje, Živovo, Kalen, Kokre, Kruševica, Manastir, Polčište, Peštani, Čanište, Brnik, Budimirci, Gradešnica, Gruništa, Zovič, Iveni, Makovo, Orle, Rapeš, Staravina, Ržanovo, Rožden, Galište, Klinovo and Majden.

=== Staravina ===
The village Staravina was once the center of the municipality Staravina. It is located in the southern part of Mariovo, 50 km away from Bitola. The trip starts in Bitola. From there it goes to the village Novaci, past the power plant REK Bitola and then up the mountain to the village Makovo. From there the road leads to the village Rapeš. The asphalt road ends after that village and from there it is a bumpy ride on a dirt road until Staravina. A permit is required to go there because the region is near the southern border of the country. There is a mountain hut located in Staravina, near the church.

=== Pešta ===
The site of Pešta dates from the 4th century BC and is located between villages of Staravina and Gradešnica. Standing in the center of Staravina, one can notice the outlines of a fortress on the horizon. There also used to be a town in the vicinity, which the villagers consider to be the birthplace of King Philip because historical dates claim that he descended from the mountains and built Pela. The closest mountain to the north-west of Pela is exactly this one in Mariovo.

=== Alšar ===
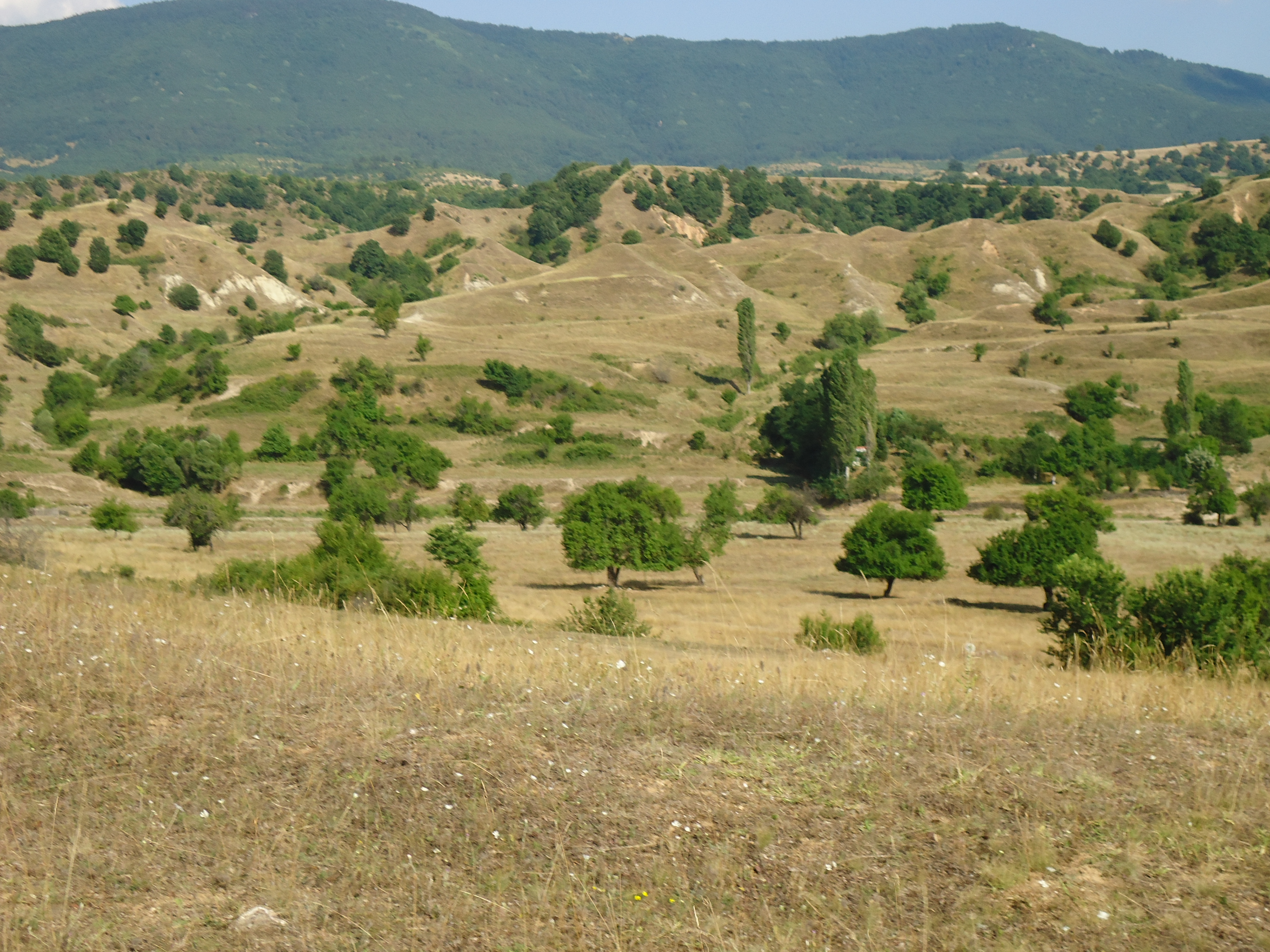
Landscape near the village Vitolište in Mariovo

Alšar, an ancient mine located in the southern Balkans, in North Macedonia, is said to contain minerals that are found nowhere else on the planet. The rarest of them all—the lorandite, a crystal of thallium. The lorandite is thought to have the potential to unravel the so-called "neutrino puzzle". By serving as a geochemical detector of the neuron, the lorandite could validate or disprove the theory of the standard solar system. In simple terms—it would let us understand the work of the Sun. The Ottomans, who ruled the peninsula until the beginning of the 20th century, called it Majdan (the word for "mine" in Turkish). This was also the name given to the nearest village. They explored for gold. But they were not the first ones at the mine. According to some, the mine has existed for over 5,000 years. It has eight entrances, two of which lead through corridors that extend up to 6 kilometers and have cobblestone pathways, placed there by the Ottomans. The mine has been closed for decades. According to experts, many world scientists are very interested in exploring Alšar. The lorandite from the mine can register in a chemical and physical way the so-called neutrino flux coming from the Sun and it is the only known substance that has this power. If the neutrino could be explored, science could understand the processes that go on inside the Sun. Some say with awe that it could lead to an understanding of the past but also of the future of our galaxy. Despite all the mystery, the fact is undisputed that Alšar is the only known place on the planet that contains the lorandite, a mineral of potentially huge significance in physics. According to rough estimates, the mine could have reserves of up to 40 tons of lorandite. A few grams of lorandite for lab research is said to cost about 5-6 euros. It is accessible from the village Konopište.

== Monasteries ==
=== Monastery St George, Polog ===
This monastery is located in south-east North Macedonia, near Kavadarci, on the border between Mariovo and Tikveš. It can be reached only by boat across man-made Tikveš Lake. One can start this unique experience from three places:

- by the dam near the village of Vozarci,
- from the village of Resava near Kamen Dol and
- from Kamenica near the village of Begnište.

It is now situated in an inaccessible area, but in the past the monastery rose high above the canyon of the river Crna, on the foothills of Višešnica. Nowadays it is secluded by the lake and completely isolated. The church, as a lonely representative of its time, honorably watches over the invaluable medieval art from the time of Tsar Dušan. According to the latest research, the building of the monastery dates before 1340 AD, and the frescoes were painted in 1343-1345. During its existence the monastery had been abandoned on several occasions, but its activity never ceased completely. In the 16th century it had an active monastic brotherhood and was a powerful spiritual center. The large gold-plated wooden cross was carved in this period (1584). At the beginning of 19th century the lodgings on the eastern and on the southern side were built, the bell tower and several other buildings of practical character. Only the monastery church of St. George has survived within the walls of the monastery until today. Only fragments of the 17th century iconostasis, the icon of St. George depicting his life, the wood-carved chandelier (17th century) and three wood carved double doors (17th century) is all that has remained from the wealth of the religious object with great artistic value which once adorned the interior of the church.

=== Čebren Monastery ===
To reach the monastery you first need to go to the village Zovič which can be reached from Staravina or just by following the dirt road from Rapeš. Then from Zovič just head towards the river Crna and you will reach the monastery.

The Čebren Monastery with the Church of St. Demetrios (Sv. Dimitrija), together with the small church of Holy Saviour (Sv. Spas) located nearby, are centres of exceptional spiritual and archeological value. The Monastery belongs to the village of Zovič and is situated on the eastern bank of river Crna.

The church of St. Demetrios is a three-naval basilica with marble columns. Its iconostasis dates from the 15th century, but was renovated in the 19th century. Southeast from the monastery, on the hill which rises over the river is the small church of the Holy Saviour, probably built in the 14th century. It is a single-naval stone church with wooden roof structure covered with stone tiles (preserved only on the apse and eastern wall). The interior is completely fresco-painted and a great deal of the frescos can still be seen.

=== Gradešnica and church of St Demetrios (Sv. Dimitrija) ===
The villagе of Gradešnica is located down the slope toward the Gradeska River and its canyon. The church of St. Demetrios, a cultural monument from the 15th century, is located in this village, situated by the road at the very entrance. This church is sometimes mentioned as the church of St. Nicholas, but also known as St. Demetrios among the local population. It is a small, single-nave church covered with a semi-cylindrical vault. The massive stone iconostasis separates the space towards the altar apse. The preserved frescoes on the central part (naos) and on the iconostasis differ from those in the altar apse. According to their style, they belong to the 14th century, while those in the altar apse indicate the style of the 15th century. Visitors can reach Gradešnica from Staravina; there is an asphalt road leading there.
