= Dren (mountain) =

Mountain in North Macedonia

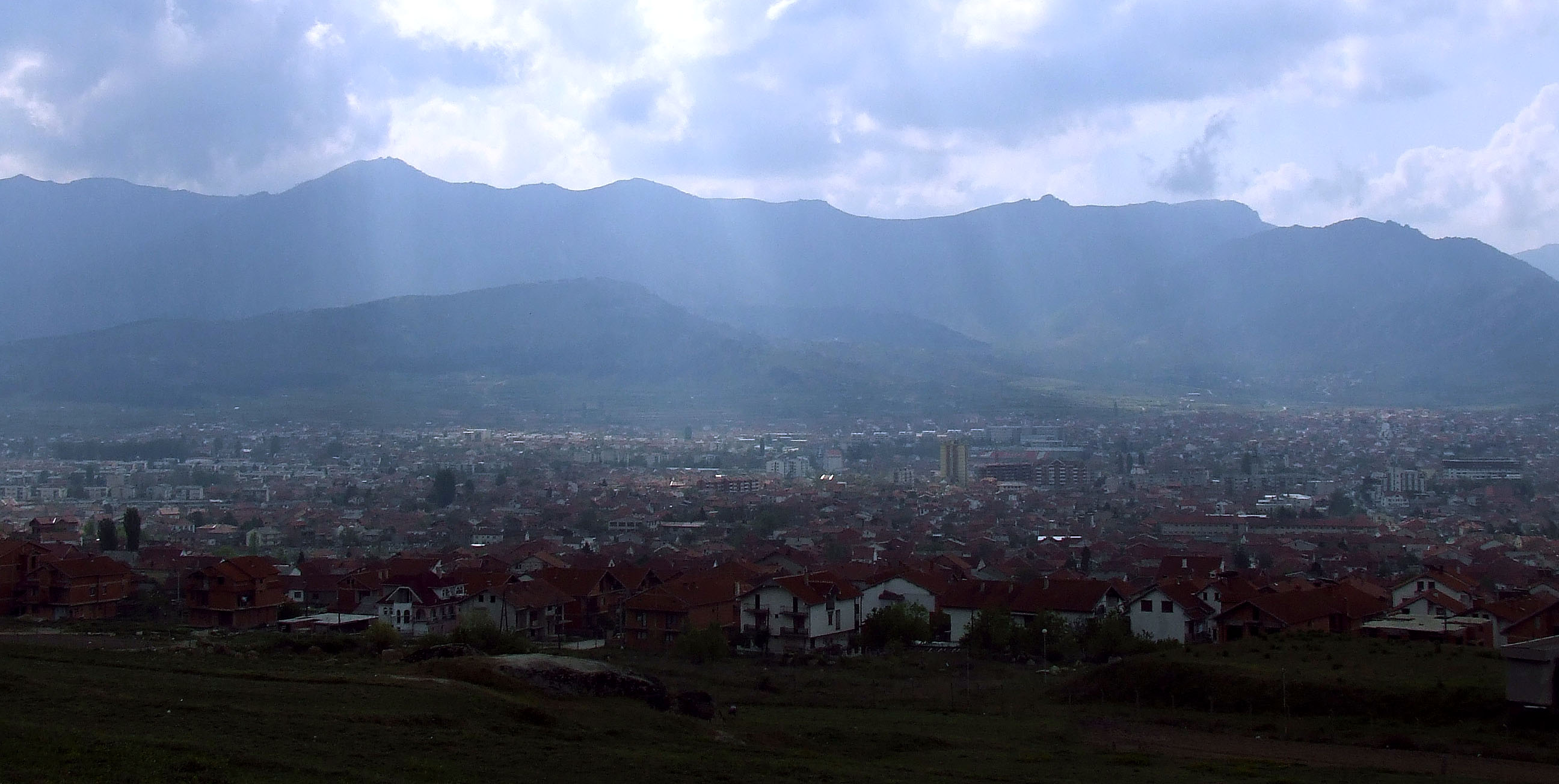
- View of Prilep from Markova Kula, with the Dren mountain in the background.

Highest point
- Peak: Livada
- Elevation: 1,663 m (5,456 ft)
- Coordinates: 41.2953°N 21.6760°E

Naming
- Native name: Дрен (Macedonian)

Geography
- Location within North Macedonia
- Country: North Macedonia

Dren (Macedonian: Дрен) is a mountain located by the town of Prilep in central North Macedonia. It stretches between the Mariovo Valley to the south and the Raečkata Valley to the northeast. With its extension, the mountain Dren encloses Prilep Field and Pelagonia from the east and the city of Prilep itself, in the south-east its slopes enclose the deep valley of Crna Reka in Mariovo, from the west it encloses the valley of Raečka Reka. To the north, Mount Dren is connected to Mount Babuna via the Pletvar pass, in the southern part through the road to the village Bonče and the former village Pisokal, the mountain is connected with Selečka Mountain. In fact, it is a continuation of Selečka Mountain with the direction of extension SE-NW. The highest peak is Livada (1,663 m) in the west, Four Beeches (1,476 m) and the Three Straits (1,476 m) in the east. Of the passes, the biggest role is played by the Ligurosa pass (1,152 m), which connects Raeč with Mariovo. Apart from the direction of extension, Dren Mountain is different from Selečka Mountain from the geological composition as well, which here is mainly composed of rocks from the marble series, for which on both slopes there are the most famous places of finding and marble excavations such as Sivec and the villages of Belovodica on the north, and Veprcani on the south slope. Due to the marble and partly limestone composition of the soil, there are Gulabinka, Pesti and Podot caves on the southern slope, and underground in the mountain there are large amounts of water that flow into the strong Gjukakovski Springs under the southern slope on the left bank of Crna and the so-called Marble Lake near Belovodica on the northern slope. The plant world includes deciduous forests of oak, elm, dogwood, less often beech and poplar, and on significantly larger areas, especially on the southern slopes in the valley of the Crna Reka is the evergreen pine forest.
