= Macedonian embroidery =

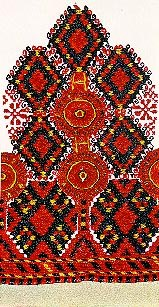
Embroidery on a female shirt from the village Dunje, Mariovo from the beginning of the 20th century.

Macedonian embroidery encompasses all forms of embroideries that are part of Macedonian culture. Macedonian embroidery began to appear with the arrival of the Slavs to the Balkan Peninsula and was transmitted through generations in accordance with the beliefs and spirituality of Macedonians. Macedonian embroidery reached its peak of development in the 19th century. The evolution of this artform, whose roots are proto-Slavic, also bears influence from other epochs and cultures.

== History ==
Macedonian embroidery began to develop with the arrival of Slavic peoples to the Balkans with which they also started adjusting their styles with Old-Balkan cultural elements. Byzantine culture was also of significant influence in the development and formation of Macedonian traditional embroidery partly due to its vicinity. Despite the five century-long Islamic influence of the country and its peoples under the Ottoman Empire, it is not further reflected on Macedonian embroidery. Nevertheless, Islamic elements, reflected in the colorful pattern changes and infiltration of new motives are evident on embroidery patterns. Despite the different cultural and historical factors that influenced it, the differentiated Macedonian embroidery was mainly the result of collectivist artistic potentials from the environment where it sprang up and existed.

== Carriers of embroideries ==
The most common form of embroideries in North Macedonia were traditional vests, especially those used in villages, which were in day-to-day use until the first decennia of this century. The embroidery was a characteristic traditional adornment, commonly found on female traditional vests, embroidered shirts and head covers.

Female shirts, which resemble tunics and are typical of North Macedonia, contain traces of ancient forms connected to Old-Balkan ornamented tunic, even before the arrival of Slavic people and also used by other Slavic peoples. Sticking to the first stadia of the development of this clothing that is related to its shape, Macedonian shirts further developed their decorations, which also reflected the luxurious style of the Byzantine textile.

Among different females embroideries used for head vests are bride vests which also contain a lot of historical values. They have an apparent similarity in form, technique, ornamentation and function to the vests of some peoples of the Povolzhye region, which confirms distant cultural and historical relationships to those peoples.

== Literature ==
- Petrusheva, Anica (1991). Народните носии, од книгата Етнологија на Македонците [Traditional vest from the Book Ethnology of the Macedonians]. Macedonian Academy of Sciences and Arts.
- Krsteva, Angelina (1987). Македонски народни везови [Macedonian traditional embroidery]. Skopje: Folklore Institute.
