= Kruševica =

Kruševica may refer to the following places:

== Settlements ==
- Kruševica (Lukavac), Bosnia and Herzegovina
- Kruševica, Prilep, North Macedonia
- Kruševica (Lazarevac), Serbia
- Kruševica (Prokuplje), Serbia
- Kruševica (Raška), Serbia
- Kruševica (Vlasotince), Serbia

== Other uses ==
- Kruševica (river), right tributary of Vrbanja river, Bosnia and Herzegovina
- Kruševica (mountain), in southern Serbia
