= Šeleverci =

Šeleverci / Sheleverci Шелеверци
- Village
- Location within North Macedonia
- Country: North Macedonia
- Region: Pelagonia
- Municipality: Prilep
- Elevation: 654 m (2,146 ft)

Population (2002)
  - Total: 21
- Time zone: UTC+1 (CET)
- Area code: +38948

A cross in the village of Šeleverci

Sheleverci is a village in Municipality of Prilep. It used to be part of the former municipality of Topolčani.

== Demographics ==
According to the 2002 census, the village had a total of 21 inhabitants. Ethnic groups in the village include:

- Macedonians 21
