= Galičani =

Galičani / Galichani Галичани
- Village
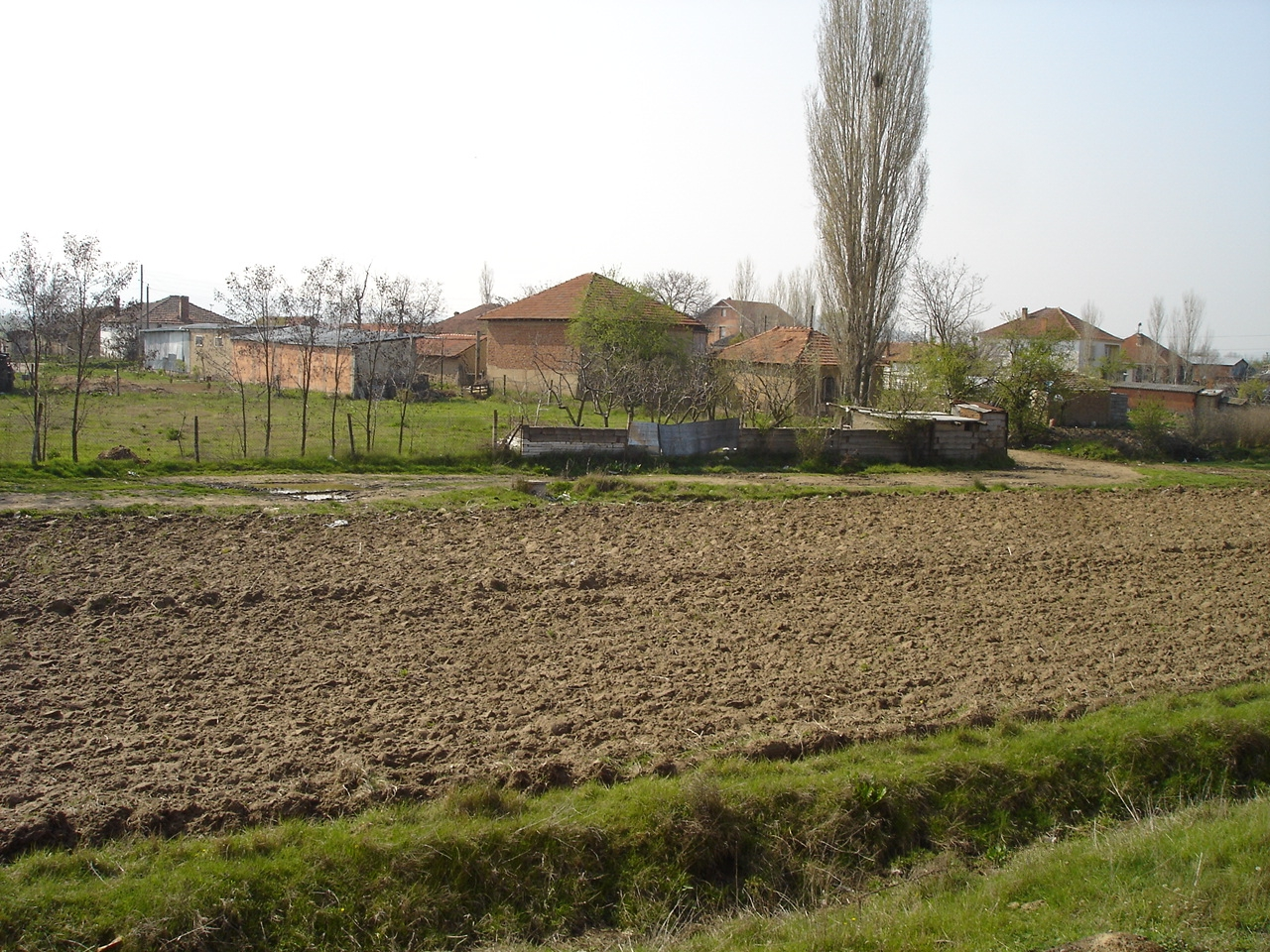
- View of Galičani

- Location within North Macedonia
- Country: North Macedonia
- Region: Pelagonia
- Municipality: Prilep
- Elevation: 599 m (1,965 ft)

Population (2021)
  - Total: 193
- Time zone: UTC+1 (CET)
- Postal code: 7515 Novo Lagovo
- Area code: +38948

Galičani (Macedonian: Галичани) is a village in Municipality of Prilep, North Macedonia. It is best known for its farming, with the production of tobacco, various fruits including plums, peaches, grapes and watermelon and vegetables such as potato, pumpkin and beans.

== Transport ==
The village has road links to Prilep, Bitola and Kruševo. Galičani is also connected by rail to Skopje, Prilep and Bitola.

== Demographics ==
Galičani appears in 15th century Ottoman defters as a village in the nahiyah of Köprülü. Among its inhabitants, a certain Petre Arbanas is recorded as a household head. The name Arbanas, is a medieval rendering for Albanian, indicating an Albanian presence in the village.

According to the 2002 census, the village had a total of 251 inhabitants. Ethnic groups in the village include:

- Macedonians 251
