= Veselčani =

Veselčani / Veselchani Веселчани
- Village
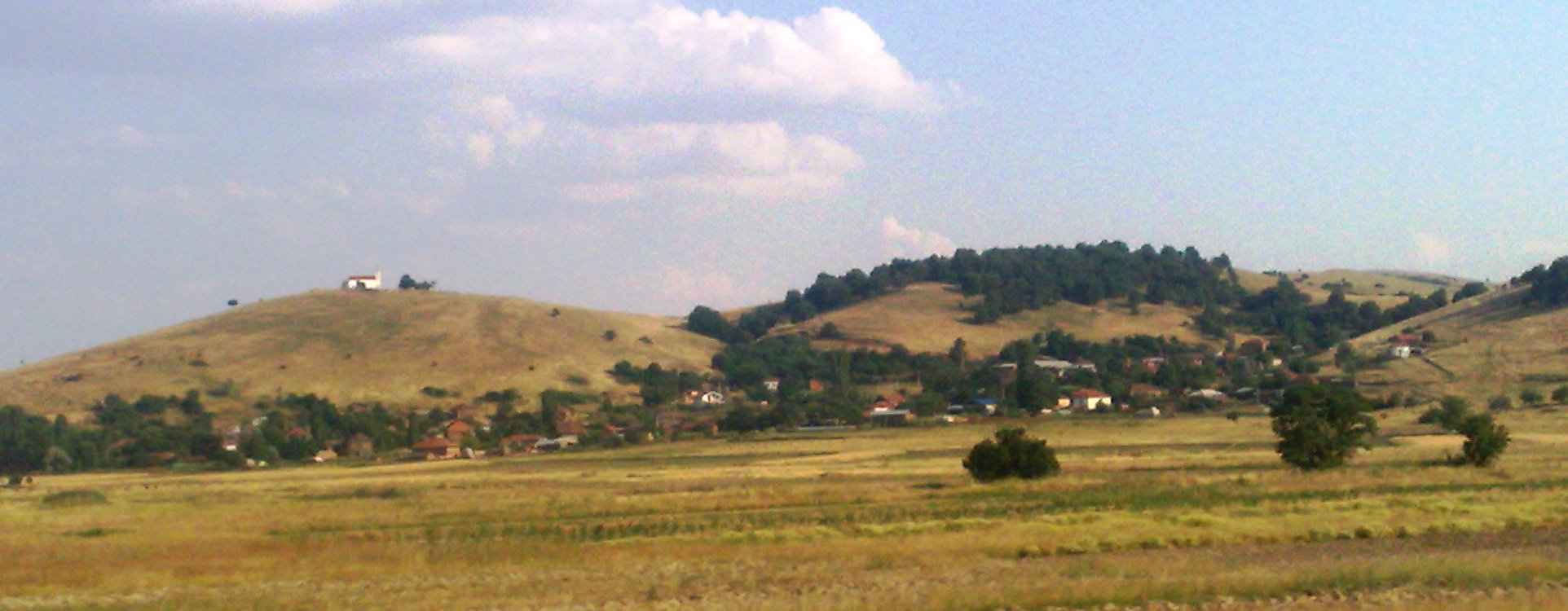
- View of Veselchani from railroad Prilep-Bitola

- Location within North Macedonia
- Country: North Macedonia
- Region: Pelagonia
- Municipality: Prilep
- Elevation: 578 m (1,896 ft)

Population (2012)
  - Total: 273
- Time zone: UTC+1 (CET)
- Postal code: 7500
- Area code: +389-48

Veselčani is a village in Municipality of Prilep. It used to be part of the former municipality of Topolčani.

== Demographics ==
According to the 1467-68 Ottoman defter, Veselčani appears being largely inhabited by an Albanian population. The register displayed mixed Albanian and Slavic anthroponymy. The names are: Gjon Arbanas, Rela Dimitri, Vlkashin son of Marin, Gropça son of Gjon, Tano son of Gropça, Todor son of Gjon.

According to the 2002 census, the village had a total of 98 inhabitants. Ethnic groups in the village include:

- Macedonians 98
