= Trojkrsti =

Trojkrsti Тројкрсти
- Village
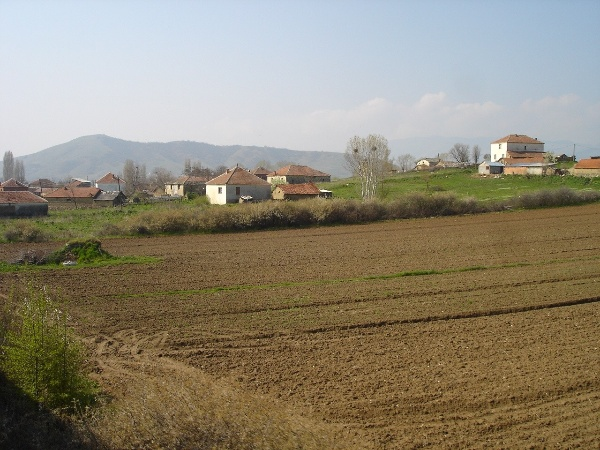

- Location within North Macedonia
- Country: North Macedonia
- Region: Pelagonia
- Municipality: Prilep
- Elevation: 561 m (1,841 ft)

Population (2002)
  - Total: 81
- Time zone: UTC+1 (CET)
- Postal code: 7512
- Area code: +389/48/4XXXXX

Trojkrsti is a village in Municipality of Prilep, North Macedonia. It used to be part of the former municipality of Topolčani.

== Demographics ==
According to the 2002 census, the village had a total of 81 inhabitants. Ethnic groups in the village include:

- Macedonians 80
- Others 1
