= Bešište =

Bešište Бешиште
- Village
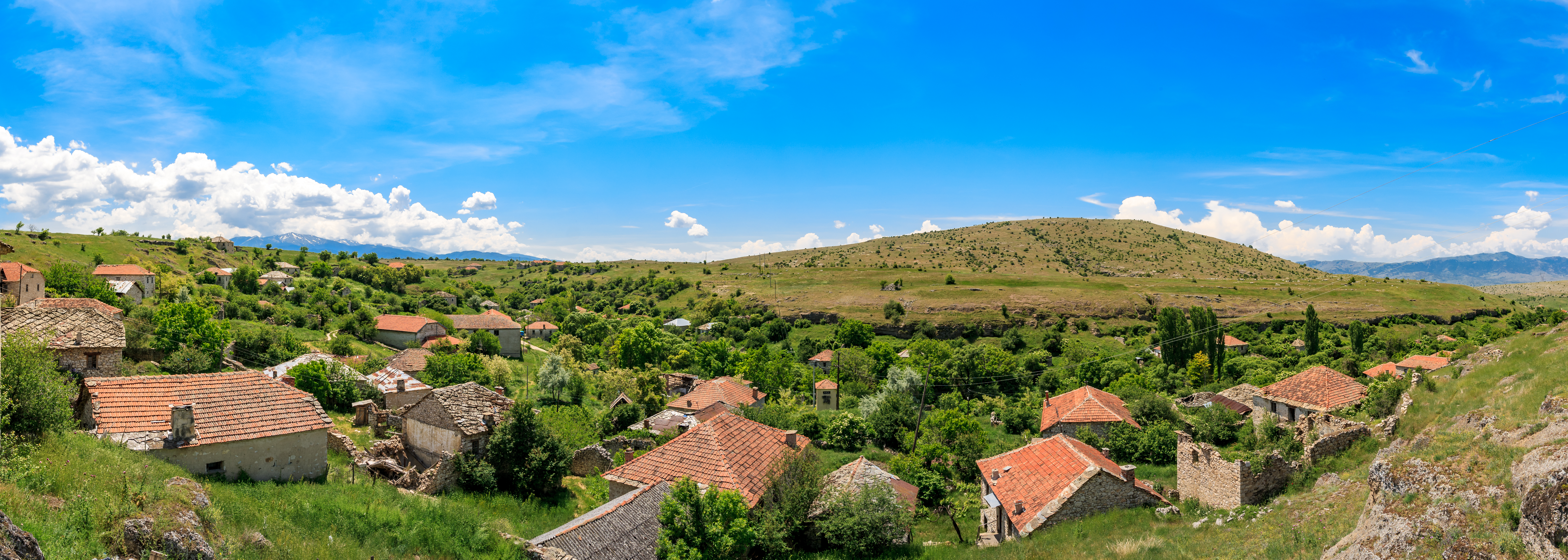
- View of Bešište

- Location within North Macedonia
- Country: North Macedonia
- Region: Pelagonia
- Municipality: Prilep
- Elevation: 1,046 m (3,432 ft)

Population (2021)
  - Total: 14
- Time zone: UTC+1 (CET)
- Postal code: 7500
- Area code: +38948

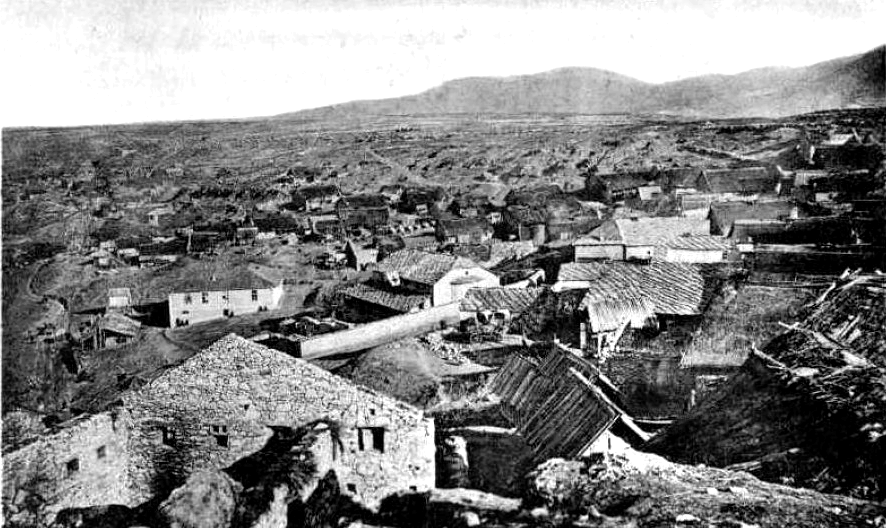
Old photo of Bešište.

Bešište (Macedonian: Бешиште) is a village located in the Municipality of Prilep, North Macedonia. It used to be part of the former municipality of Vitolište.

== Demographics ==
According to the 2002 census, the village had a total of 22 inhabitants. Ethnic groups in the village include:

- Macedonians 22
