= Rakle, Prilep =

Rakle Ракле
- Village
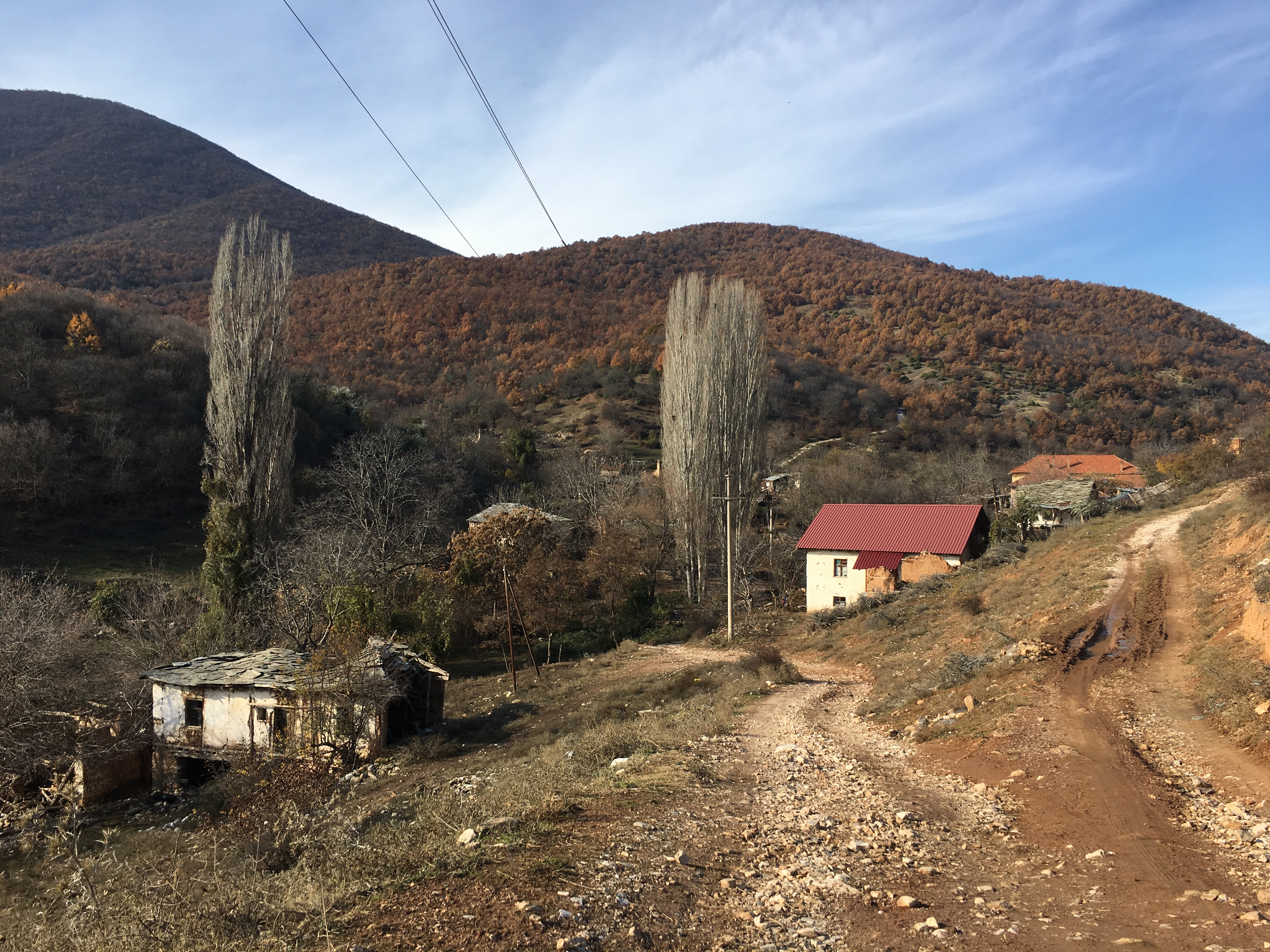

- Location within North Macedonia
- Country: North Macedonia
- Region: Pelagonia
- Municipality: Prilep
- Elevation: 511 m (1,677 ft)

Population (2002)
  - Total: 7
- Time zone: UTC+1 (CET)
- Area code: +389 (0)48

Rakle is a village in Municipality of Prilep.

== History ==
On 14 July 1907 on the Knife Peak, near the village of Rakle, Prilep Region, VMRO uprising took place known as Battle of Knife against Ottoman Army.

== Demographics ==
According to the 2002 census, the village had a total of 7 inhabitants. Ethnic groups in the village include:

- Macedonians 7
