= Polčište =

Polčište Полчиште
- Village
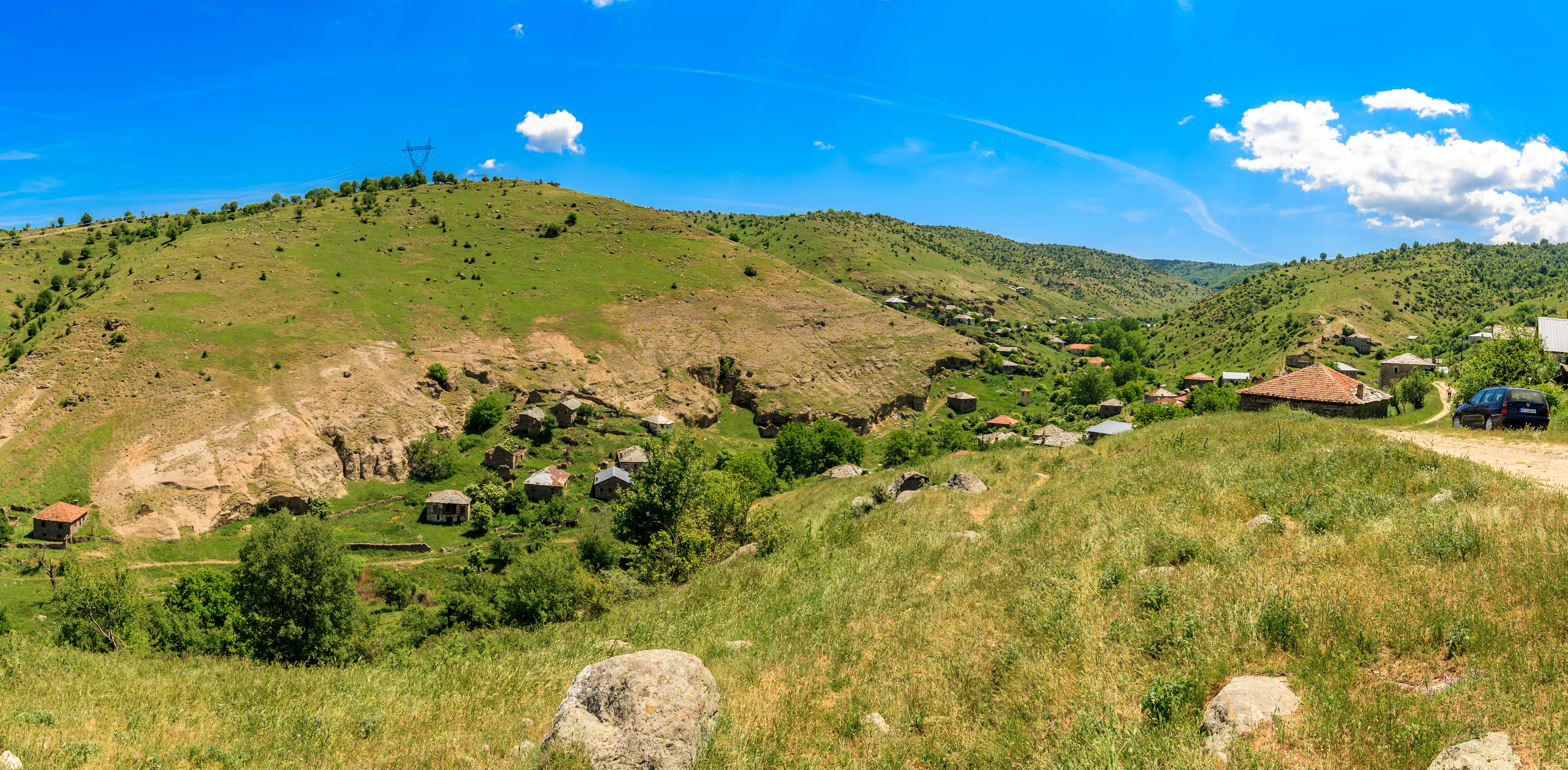
- Panoramic view of the village

- Location within North Macedonia
- Country: North Macedonia
- Region: Pelagonia
- Municipality: Prilep
- Elevation: 980 m (3,220 ft)

Population (2002)
  - Total: 31
- Time zone: UTC+1 (CET)
- Postal code: 7508
- Area code: +38948

Polčište (Macedonian: Полчиште) is a village located in the Municipality of Prilep. It used to be part of the former municipality of Vitolište.

== Demographics ==
According to the 2002 census, the village had a total of 31 inhabitants. Ethnic groups in the village include:

- Macedonians 31
