= Kalen, North Macedonia =

Kalen Кален
- Village
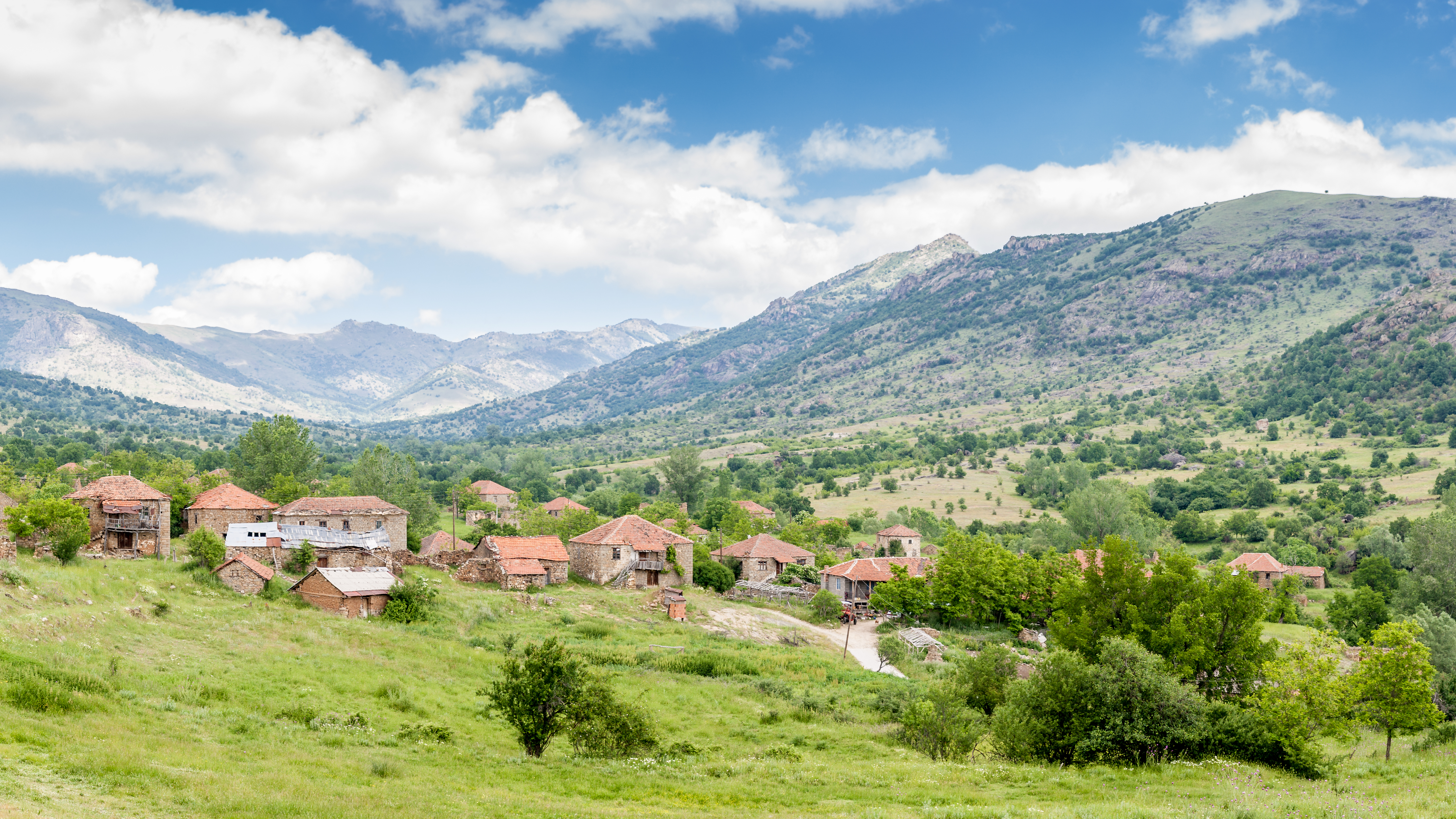
- View of Kalen

- Location within North Macedonia
- Country: North Macedonia
- Region: Pelagonia
- Municipality: Prilep
- Elevation: 634 m (2,080 ft)

Population (2021)
  - Total: 5
- Time zone: UTC+1 (CET)

Kalen is a village in Prilep Municipality in North Macedonia. It used to be part of the former municipality of Vitolište.

== Demographics ==
According to the 2002 census, the village had a total of 19 inhabitants. Ethnic groups in the village include:

- Macedonians 19
