= Zapološko =

Zapološko / Zapoloshko Заполошко
- Village
- Country: North Macedonia
- Municipality: Prilep
- Elevation: 1,065 m (3,494 ft)

Population (1900)
  - Total: 0
- Time zone: UTC+1 (CET)

Zapološko is a former village in North Macedonia.
