= Staro Lagovo =

Staro Lagovo Старо Лагово
- Village
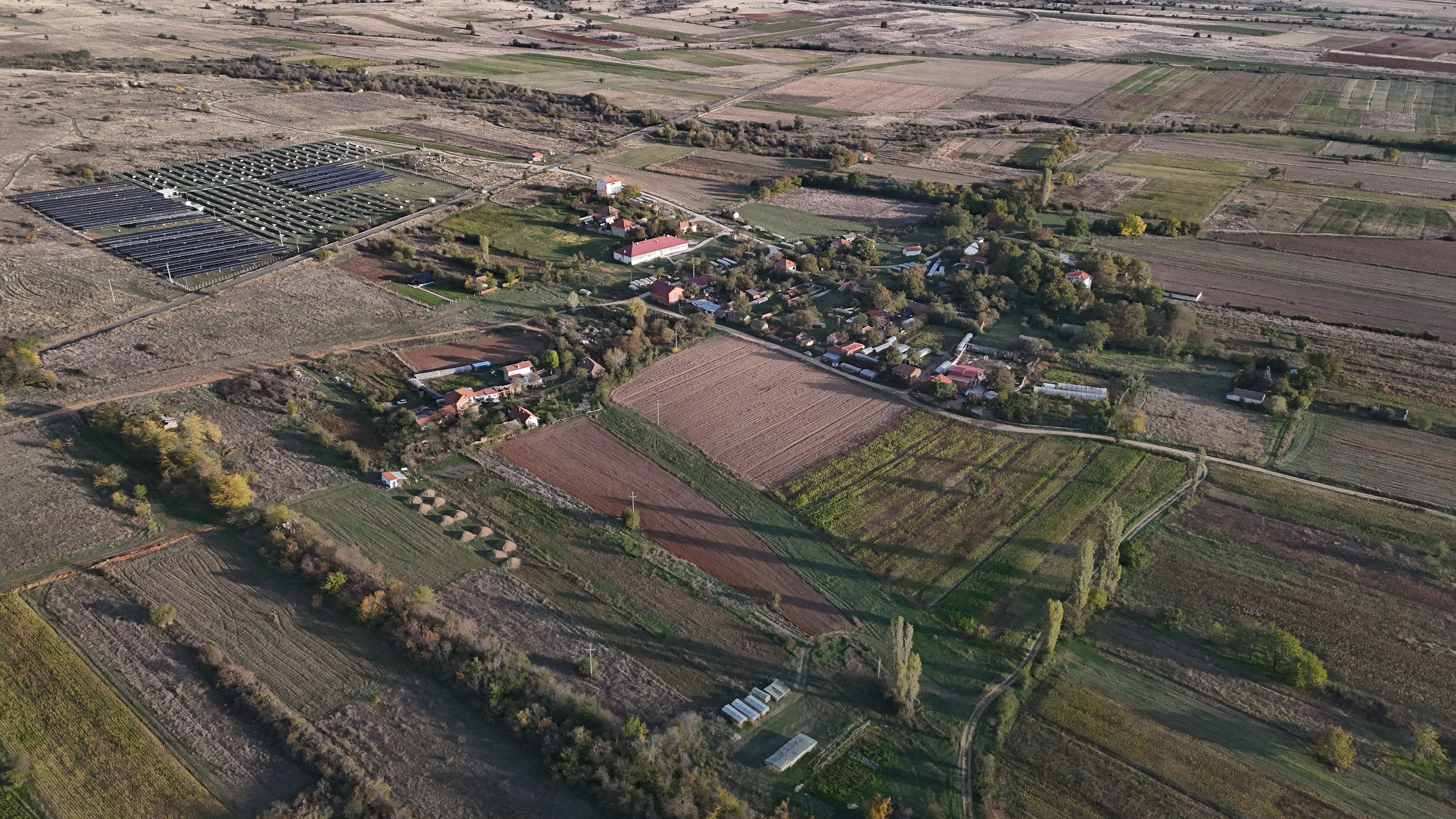
- Air view of the village

- Location within North Macedonia
- Country: North Macedonia
- Region: Pelagonia
- Municipality: Prilep
- Elevation: 666 m (2,185 ft)

Population (2002)
  - Total: 38
- Time zone: UTC+1 (CET)
- Postal code: 7515
- Area code: +389/48/4550XX

Staro Lagovo is a village in Municipality of Prilep, North Macedonia. Till 1912 it was just known as Lagovo.

== Demographics ==
According to the 2002 census, the village had a total of 38 inhabitants. Ethnic groups in the village include:

- Macedonians 38
