= Čanište =

Čanište Чаниште
- Village
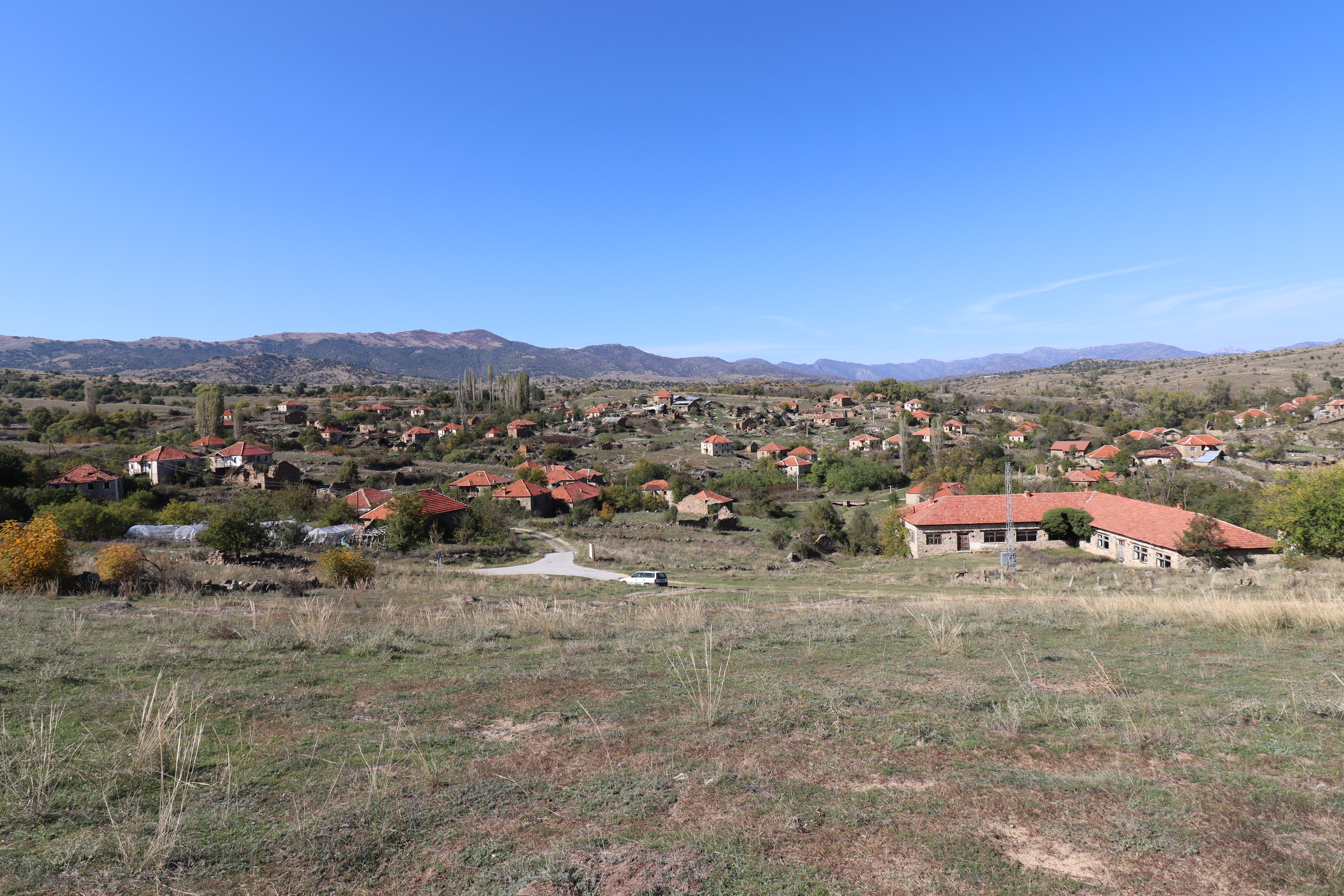
- View of the village

- Location within North Macedonia
- Country: North Macedonia
- Region: Pelagonia
- Municipality: Prilep
- Elevation: 720 m (2,360 ft)

Population (2021)
  - Total: 21
- Time zone: UTC+1 (CET)
- Postal code: 7506
- Area code: +389484XXXXX

Čanište (Macedonian: Чаниште) is a village located in the Municipality of Prilep, North Macedonia. It used to be part of the former municipality of Vitolište.

== Demographics ==
According to the 2002 census, the village had a total of 47 inhabitants. Ethnic groups in the village include:

- Macedonians 47
