= Prilepec =

Prilepec Прилепец
- Village
- Location within North Macedonia
- Country: North Macedonia
- Region: Pelagonia
- Municipality: Prilep
- Elevation: 840 m (2,760 ft)

Population (2002)
  - Total: 9
- Time zone: UTC+1 (CET)
- Area code: +38948

Prilepec (Macedonian: Прилепец) is a village in Municipality of Prilep.

== Demographics ==
According to the 2002 census, the village had a total of 9 inhabitants. Ethnic groups in the village include:

- Macedonians 9
