= Smolani =

Coordinates: 41°20′03″N 21°46′26″E

Smolani Смолани
- Village
- Interactive map of Smolani
- Country: North Macedonia
- Municipality: Prilep
- Elevation: 616 m (2,021 ft)

Population (2002)
  - Total: 0
- Time zone: UTC+1 (CET)
- Area code: +389/48/4XXXXX

Smolani (Macedonian: Смоланиi) is a former village in the Municipality of Prilep, North Macedonia.
