= Dunje =

Dunje Дуње
- Village
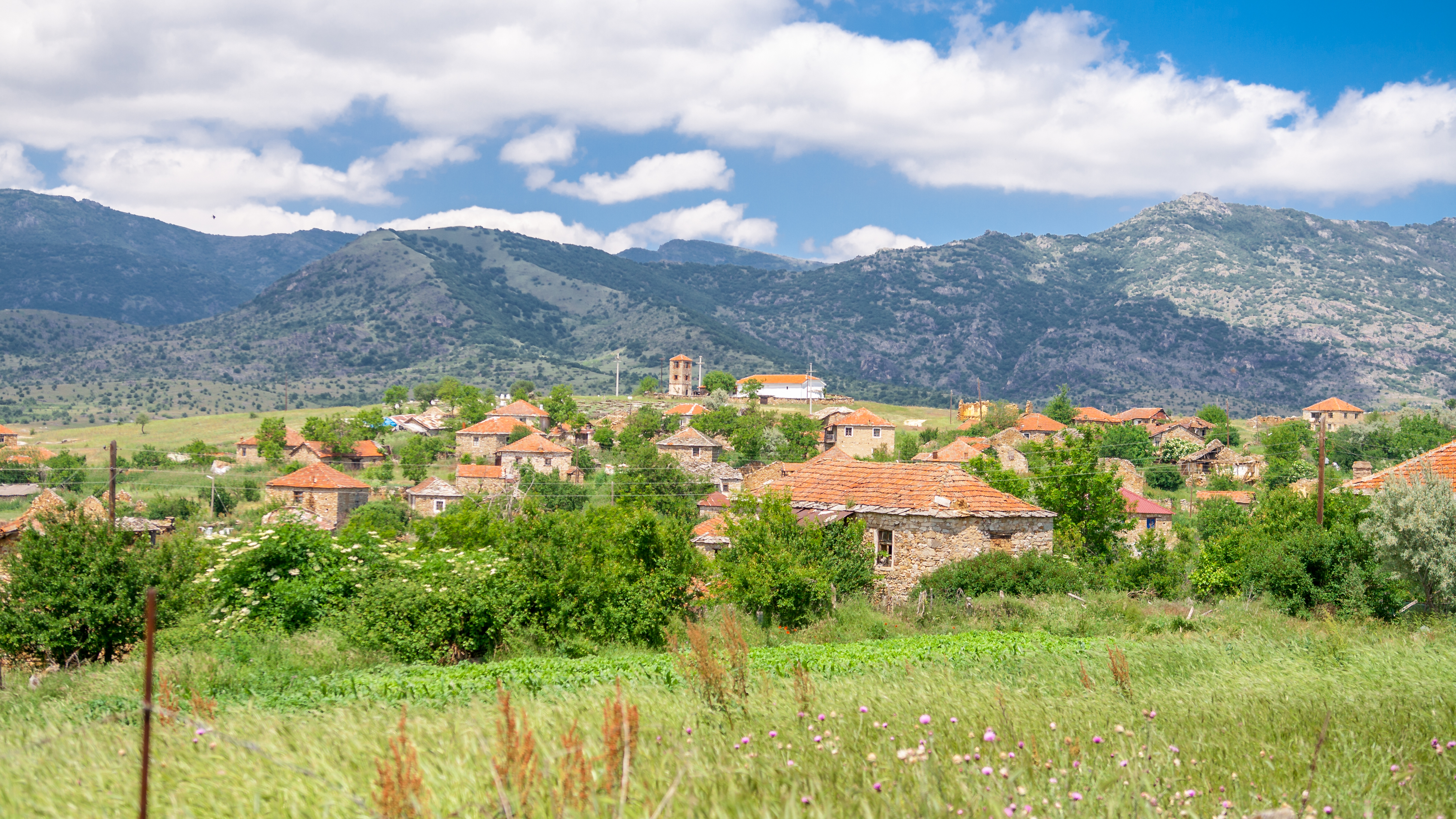
- Panoramic view of the village Dunje

- Location within North Macedonia
- Country: North Macedonia
- Region: Pelagonia
- Municipality: Prilep
- Elevation: 588 m (1,929 ft)

Population (2021)
  - Total: 10
- Time zone: UTC+1 (CET)
- Postal code: 7506
- Area code: +389484XXXXX

Dunje is a village in Municipality of Prilep, North Macedonia. It used to be part of the former municipality of Vitolište.

During the ancient times it was the settlement Dostoneoi (Greek: Δοστινίκα).

== Demographics ==
Dunje appears in 15th century Ottoman defters as a village in the nahiyah of Mariovo. Among its inhabitants, a certain Dimitri Arbanas is recorded as a household head. The name Arbanas, is a medieval rendering for Albanian, indicating an Albanian presence in the village.

According to the 2002 census, the village had a total of 77 inhabitants. Ethnic groups in the village include:

- Macedonians 77
