= Pešterica =

Coordinates: 41°23′15″N 21°35′55″E

Pešterica / Peshterica Пештерица
- Village
- Interactive map of Pešterica / Peshterica
- Country: North Macedonia
- Municipality: Prilep

Population (2002)
  - Total: 0
- Time zone: UTC+1 (CET)

Peshterica is a former village in Municipality of Prilep, North Macedonia. It is now submerged under the Prilep Lake.
