= Berovci =

Berovci Беровци
- Village
- Location within North Macedonia
- Country: North Macedonia
- Region: Pelagonia
- Municipality: Prilep
- Elevation: 612 m (2,008 ft)

Population (2021)
  - Total: 365
- Time zone: UTC+1 (CET)
- Postal code: 7501
- Area code: +38948

Berovci (Macedonian: Беровци) is a village in Municipality of Prilep, North Macedonia.

== Demographics ==
As of the 2021 census, Berovci had 365 residents with the following ethnic composition:

- Macedonians 340
- Persons for whom data are taken from administrative sources 23
- Others 2

According to the 2002 census, the village had a total of 334 inhabitants. Ethnic groups in the village include:

- Macedonians 333
- Others 1
