= Erekovci =

Erekovci Ерековци Erekler
- Village
- Location within North Macedonia
- Coordinates: 41°12′46″N 21°28′59″E
- Country: North Macedonia
- Region: Pelagonia
- Municipality: Prilep
- Elevation: 660 m (2,170 ft)

Population (2021)
  - Total: 217
- Time zone: UTC+1 (CET)
  - Summer (DST): UTC+2 (CEST)
- Postal code: 7514
- Area code: +389484XXXXX
- Car plates: BT
- Website: .

Erekovci (Macedonian: Ерековци, Turkish: Erekler) is a village in the municipality of Prilep, North Macedonia.

== Demographics ==
Erekovci is attested in the Ottoman defter of 1467/68 as a village in the vilayet of Manastir. The inhabitants attested largely mixed Slavic-Albanian anthroponyms, such as Gon son of Svetimir.

On the Ethnographic Map of the Bitola Vilayet of the Cartographic Institute in Sofia from 1901, Erekovci appears as a mixed village of Bulgarians, Albanians and Turks in the Prilep Kaza of the Bitola Sanjak with 60 houses.

The Yugoslav census of 1953 recorded 1003 people of whom 736 were Turks, 256 Macedonians, and 1 Romani. The 1961 Yugoslav census recorded 789 people of whom 698 were Macedonians, 89 Turks, and 2 others. The 1971 census recorded 643 people of whom 624 were Macedonians, 16 Turks, 1 Albanian, and 2 others. The 1981 Yugoslav census recorded 684 people of whom 677 were Macedonians and 7 Turks. The Macedonian census of 1994 recorded 455 people of whom 450 were Macedonians, 4 Turks, and 1 other.

According to the 2002 census, the village had a total of 385 inhabitants. Ethnic groups in the village include:

- Macedonians 382
- Serbs 1
- Others 2
