= Veprčani =

Veprčani Вепрчани
- Village
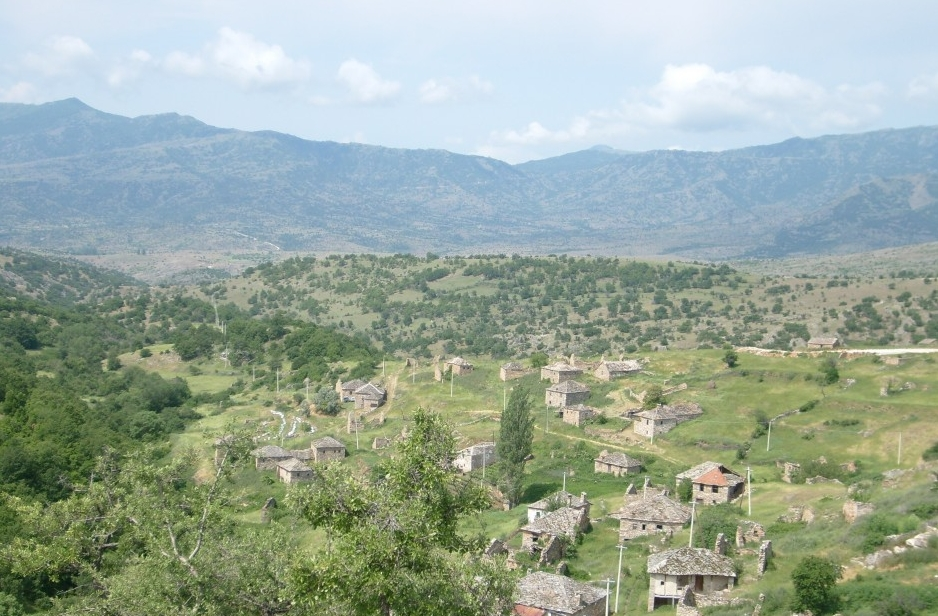
- Panorama of Veprčani

- Location within North Macedonia
- Country: North Macedonia
- Region: Pelagonia
- Municipality: Prilep
- Elevation: 959 m (3,146 ft)

Population (2002)
  - Total: 10
- Time zone: UTC+1 (CET)
- Postal code: 7500
- Area code: +389-48

Veprčani (Macedonian: Вепрчани) is a village located in the Municipality of Prilep. It used to be part of the former municipality of Vitolište.

== Demographics ==
According to the 2002 census, the village had a total of 10 inhabitants. Ethnic groups in the village include:

- Macedonians 10
