= Novo Lagovo =

Novo Lagovo Ново Лагово
- Village
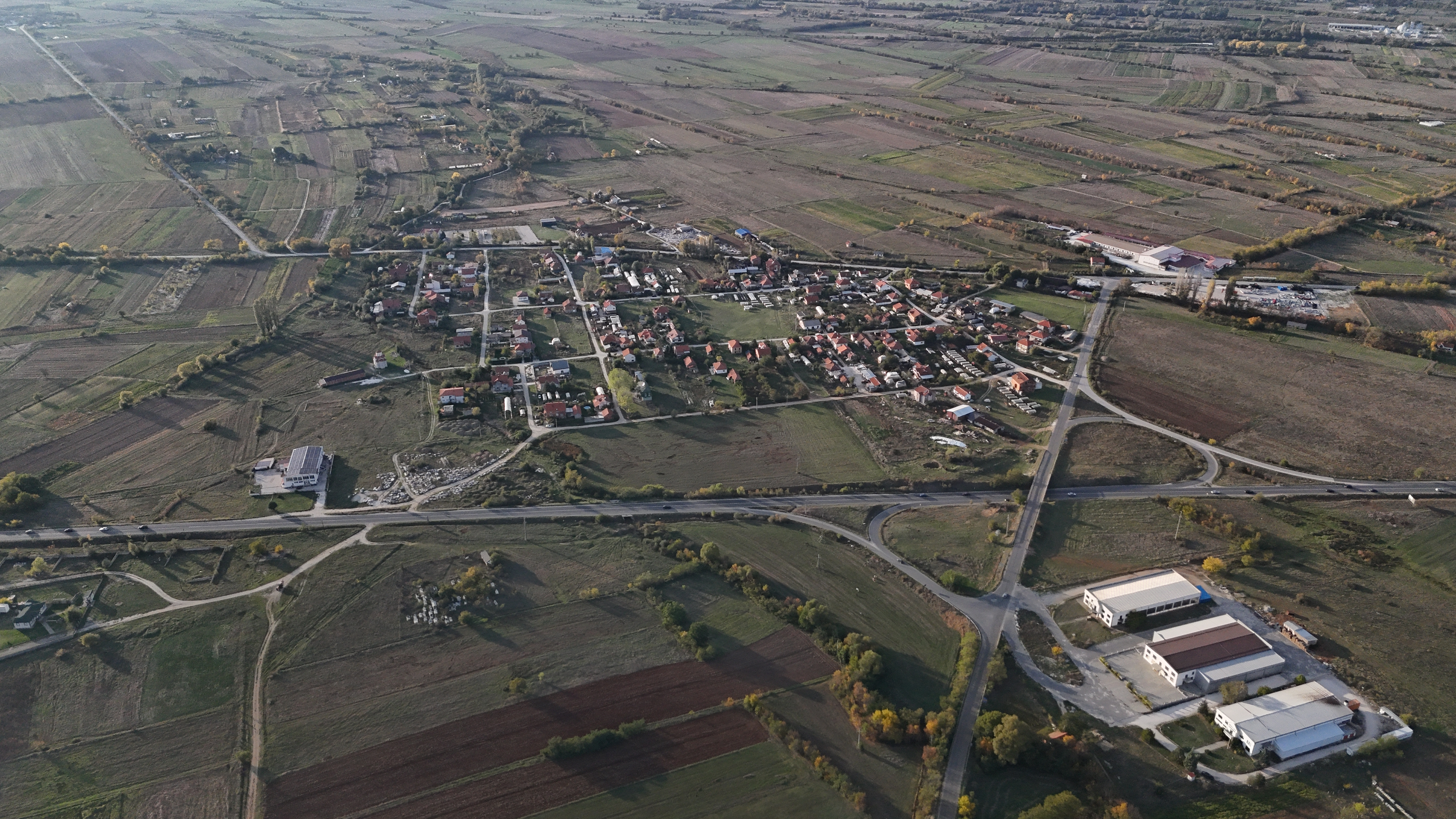
- Air view of Novo Lagovo

- Location within North Macedonia
- Country: North Macedonia
- Region: Pelagonia
- Municipality: Prilep
- Established: 1912
- Elevation: 623 m (2,044 ft)

Population (2021)
  - Total: 224
- Time zone: UTC+1 (CET)
- Postal code: 7515
- Area code: +38948XXXXXX

Novo Lagovo is a village in Municipality of Prilep, North Macedonia.

== Demographics ==
As of the 2021 census, Novo Lagovo had 224 residents with the following ethnic composition:

- Macedonians 207
- Persons for whom data are taken from administrative sources 8
- Others 5
- Serbs 4

According to the 2002 census, the village had a total of 213 inhabitants. Ethnic groups in the village include:

- Macedonians 207
- Serbs 4
- Others 2
