= Živovo =

Coordinates: 41°12′28″N 21°48′59″E

Živovo / Zhivovo Живово
- Former village
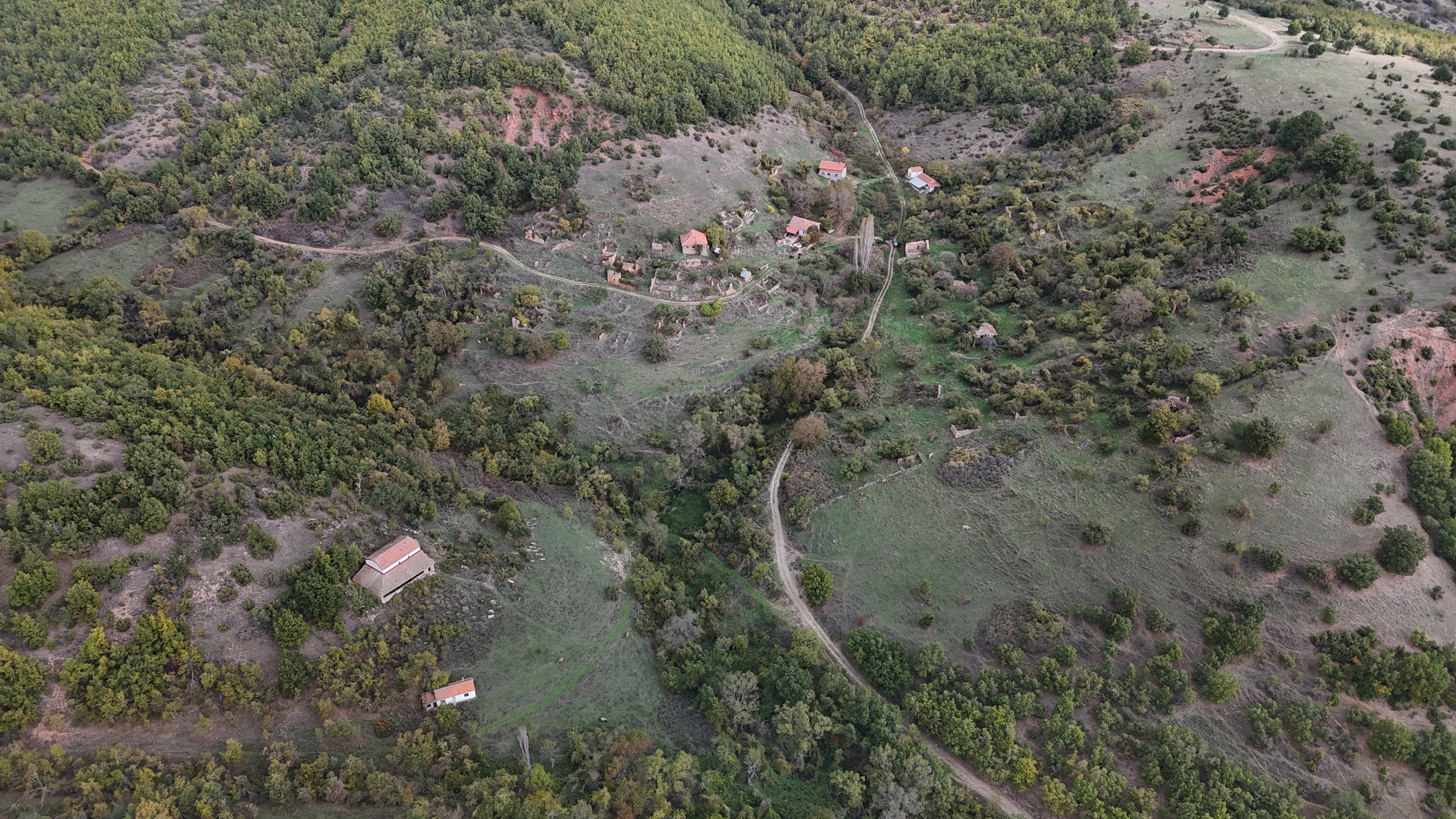
- Air view of the village
- Interactive map of Živovo / Zhivovo
- Country: North Macedonia
- Municipality: Prilep
- Elevation: 920 m (3,020 ft)

Population (2002)
  - Total: 0
- Time zone: UTC+1 (CET)
- Area code: +389/48/4XXXXX

Zivovo is a former village in Prilep, North Macedonia.
