= Belovodica =

Belovodica Беловодица
- Village
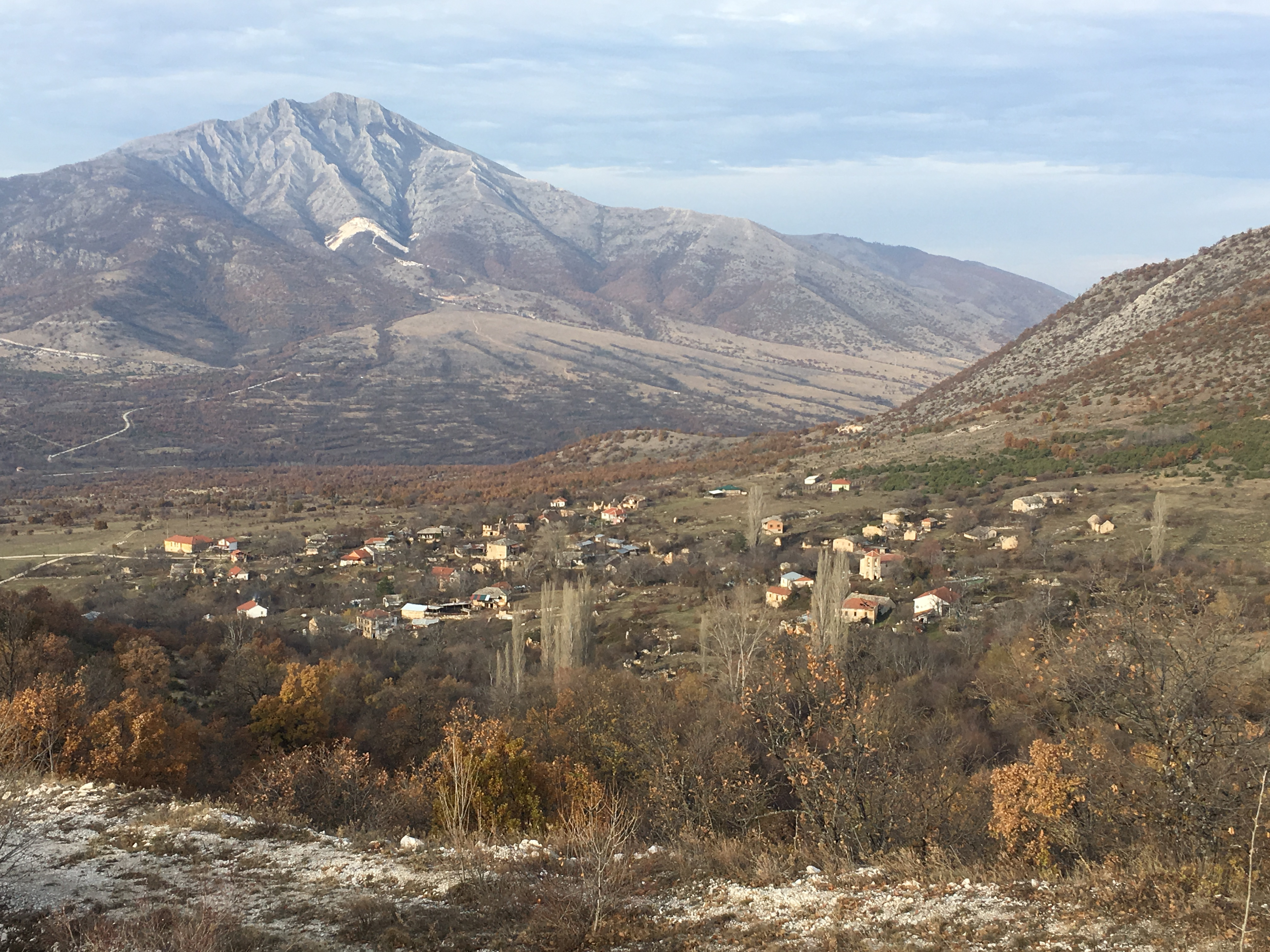
- Old picture of Belovodica

- Location within North Macedonia
- Country: North Macedonia
- Region: Pelagonia
- Municipality: Prilep
- Elevation: 673 m (2,208 ft)

Population (2021)
  - Total: 15
- Time zone: UTC+1 (CET)
- Postal code: 7501
- Area code: +38948

Belovodica is a village in the Prilep Municipality of North Macedonia.

== Geography ==
The village is located in the Dren mountain range east of Prilep.

== History ==
In the 19th century, Belovodica was a Macedonian village in the Prilep region of the Ottoman Empire. According to the statistics of Vasil Kanchov's book Macedonia: Ethnography And Statistics published in 1900, Belovodica had a population of 510 people, all of whom Macedonian Christians.

At the outbreak of the Balkan Wars, a person from Belovodica served in the Macedonian-Adrianopolitan Volunteer Corps.

In 1980, Saint George's Church was consecrated by Gavril Povardarski.

According to the 2001 census, Belovodica had a population of 24 people, all Macedonians.

Belovodica's periphery is home to a lake located within the marble mine 3.4km south of the village.
