= Vrpsko =

Coordinates: 41°14′21″N 21°48′47″E

Vrpsko Врпско
- Village
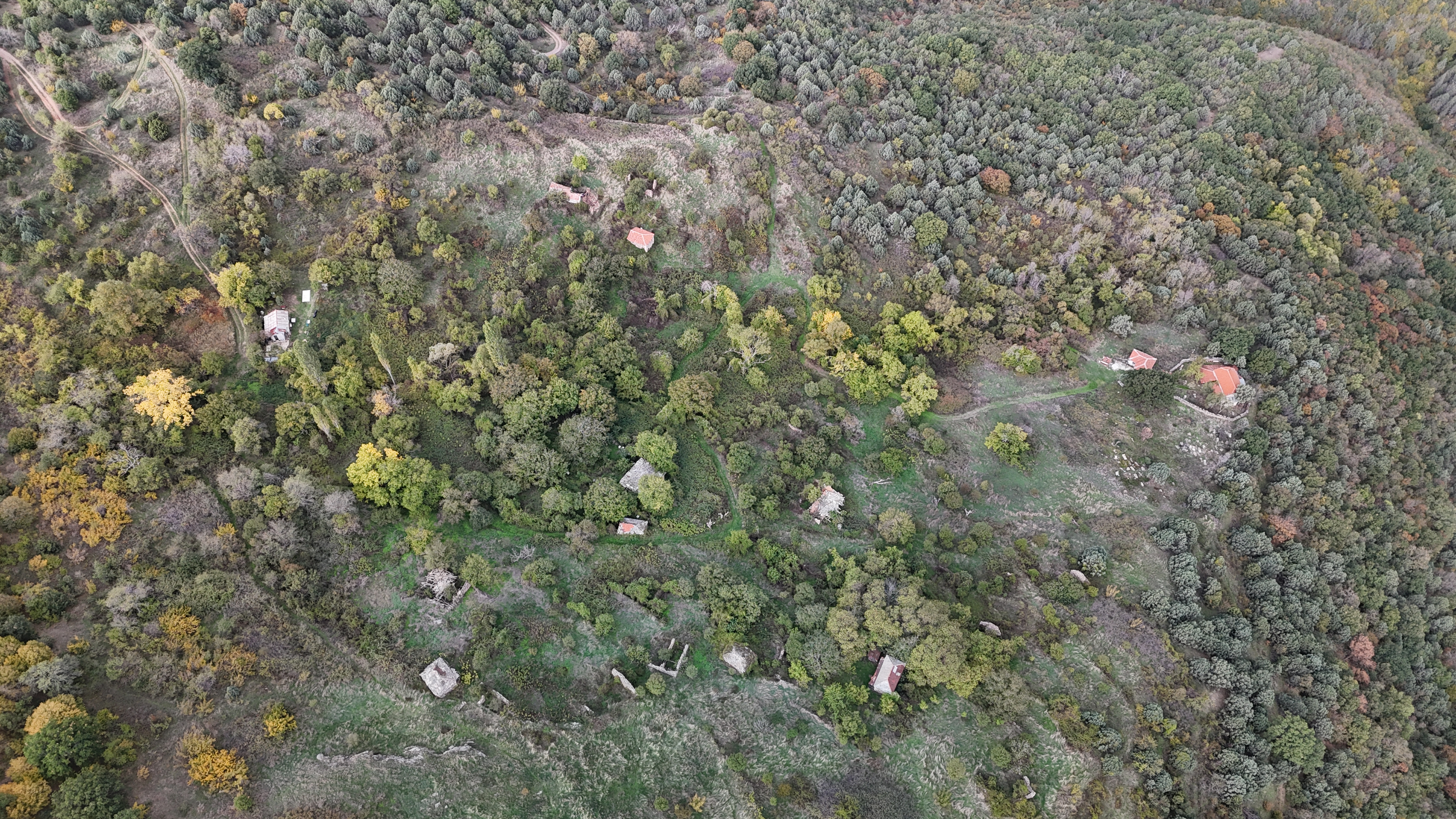
- Air view of the village
- Interactive map of Vrpsko
- Country: North Macedonia
- Municipality: Prilep
- Elevation: 815 m (2,674 ft)

Population (2021)
  - Total: 0
- Time zone: UTC+1 (CET)
- Postal code: 7500
- Area code: +38948

Vrpsko is a currently uninhabited village in Municipality of Prilep.
