= Pisokal =

Coordinates: 41°14′53″N 21°36′27″E

Pisokal Писокал
- Village
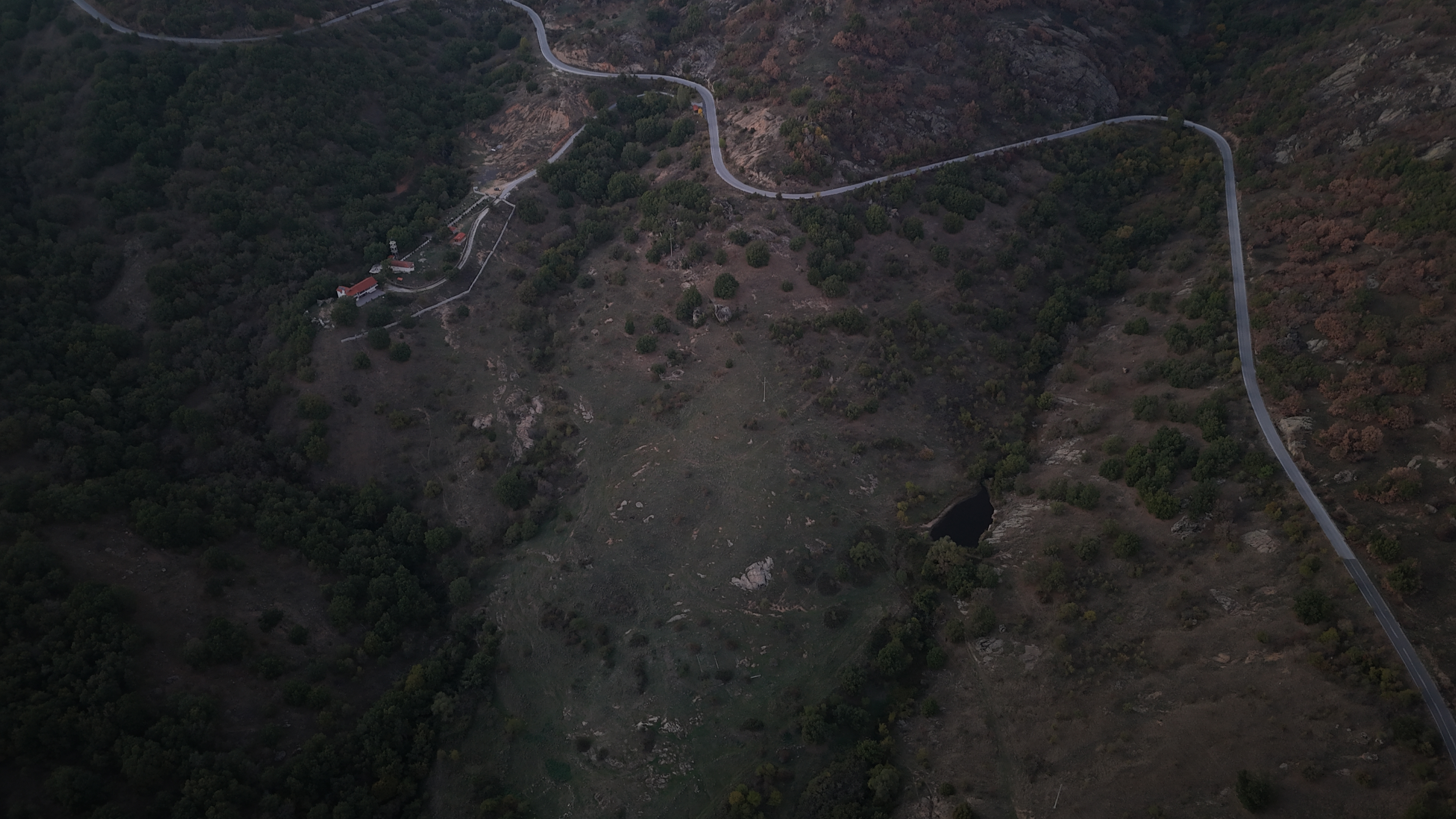
- Air view of the former village
- Interactive map of Pisokal
- Country: North Macedonia
- Municipality: Prilep

Population (2002)
  - Total: 0
- Time zone: UTC+1 (CET)
- Area code: +389/48/4XXXXX

Pisokal is a former village in Municipality of Prilep, North Macedonia.
