= Kruševica, Prilep =

Kruševica Крушевица
- Village
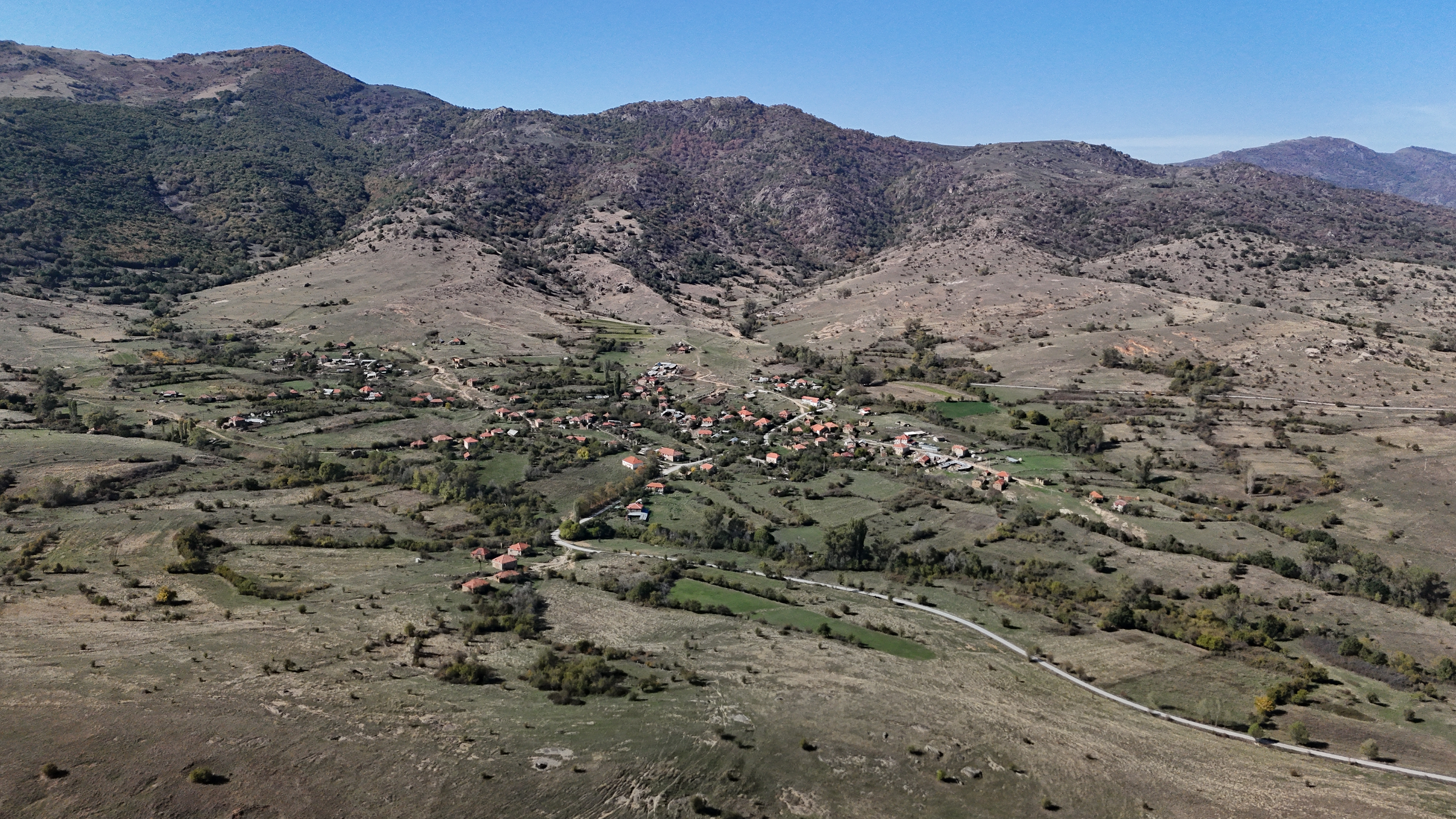
- Air view of the village

- Location within North Macedonia
- Country: North Macedonia
- Region: Pelagonia
- Municipality: Prilep
- Elevation: 759 m (2,490 ft)

Population (2002)
  - Total: 87
- Time zone: UTC+1 (CET)
- Area code: +389/48/4XXXXX

Kruševica (Macedonian: Крушевица) is a village located in the Municipality of Prilep, North Macedonia. It used to be part of the former municipality of Vitolište.

== Demographics ==
According to the 2002 census, the village had a total of 87 inhabitants. Ethnic groups in the village include:

- Macedonians 86
- Others 1
