= Povolzhye Cossacks =

Army regiment

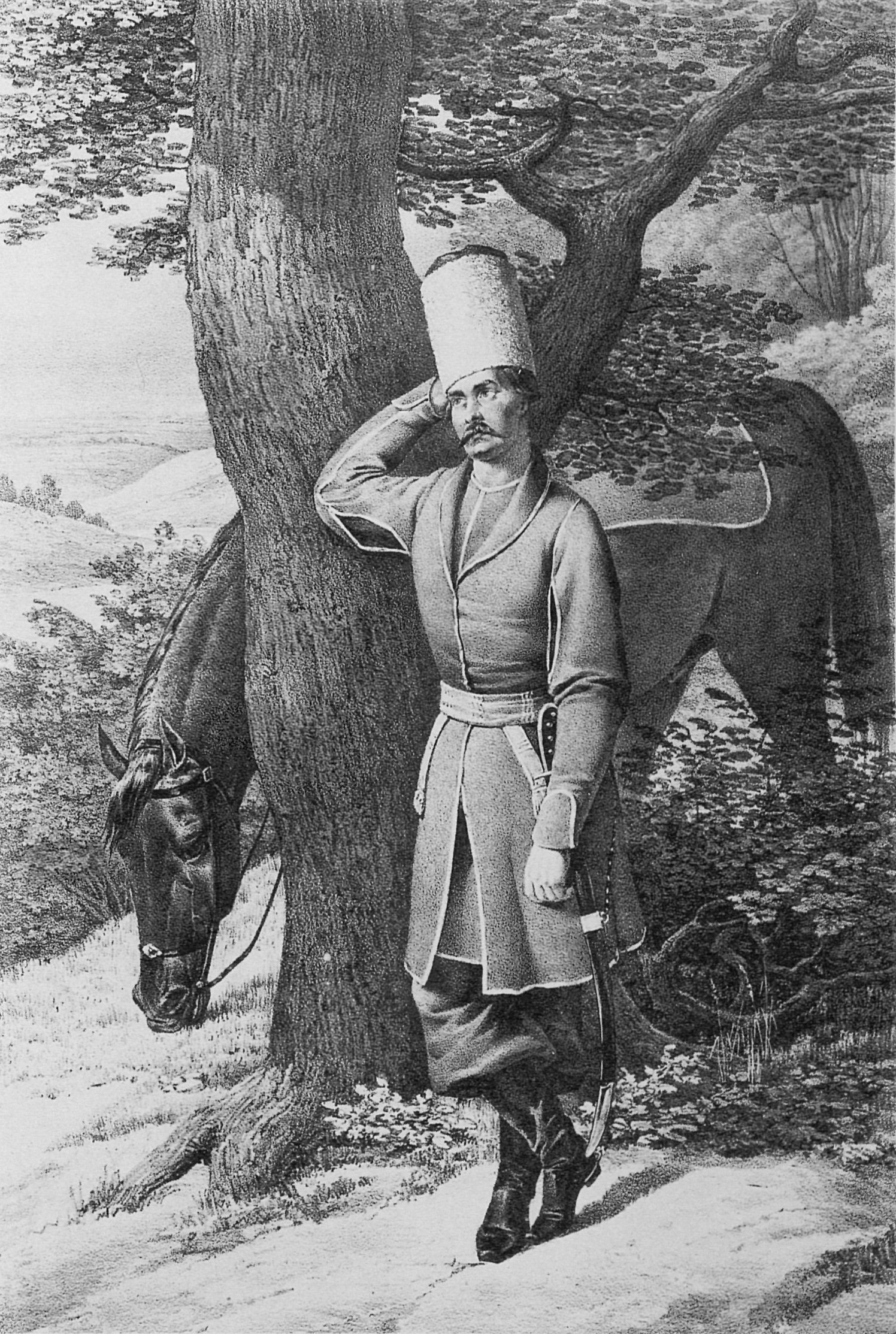
Volga cossack in traditional Russian clothing and weapon from the year 1774. Picture was made before 1841.

The Povolzyhe Cossacks or Volga Cossacks (Russian: Волжские казаки) were free Cossack communities in Russia which were recorded in sources from the 16th century on. They inhabited the areas along the Volga River.

The Volga Cossacks participated in Yermak's conquest of Siberia. Due to the creation of the Tsaritsyn fortified line in the 18th century, the central government decided to form the Volga Cossack Host (Волгское казачье войско) consisting of 1057 families (mostly Don Cossacks) with the center in Dubovka (north of Tsaritsyn). The Volga Cossacks participated in Pugachev's Rebellion in 1773-1775.

In 1770 and 1777 the majority of the Volga Cossacks were relocated to the North Caucasus to form the Mozdok and Volga regiments of the Terek Cossack Host. The Volga Cossack Host proper was abolished. The remnants of the Volga Cossack Host were merged with the Astrakhan Cossack Host in the early 19th century.

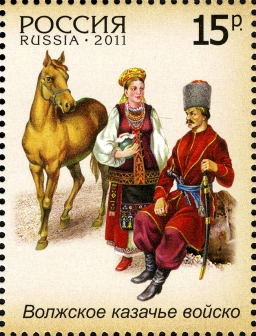
Russian stamp from 2011 pictures Volga Cossacks

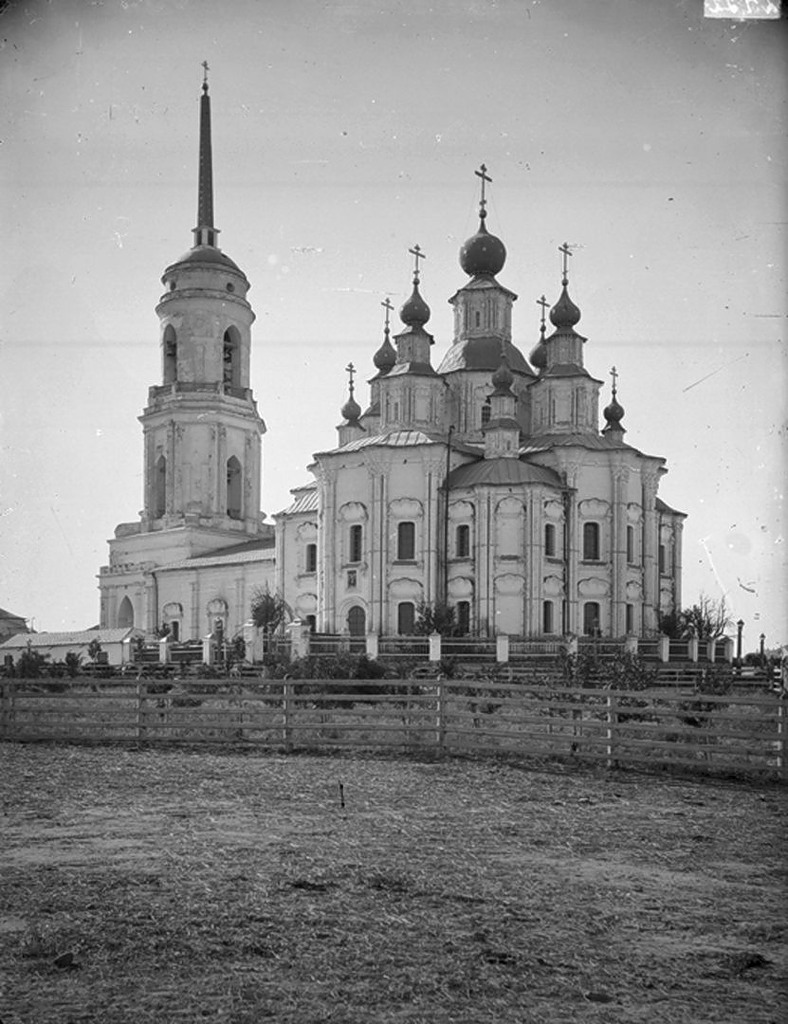
Uspensky Cathedral in Dubovka, Volgograd Oblast. The city was an important center for the Volga Cossacks. .

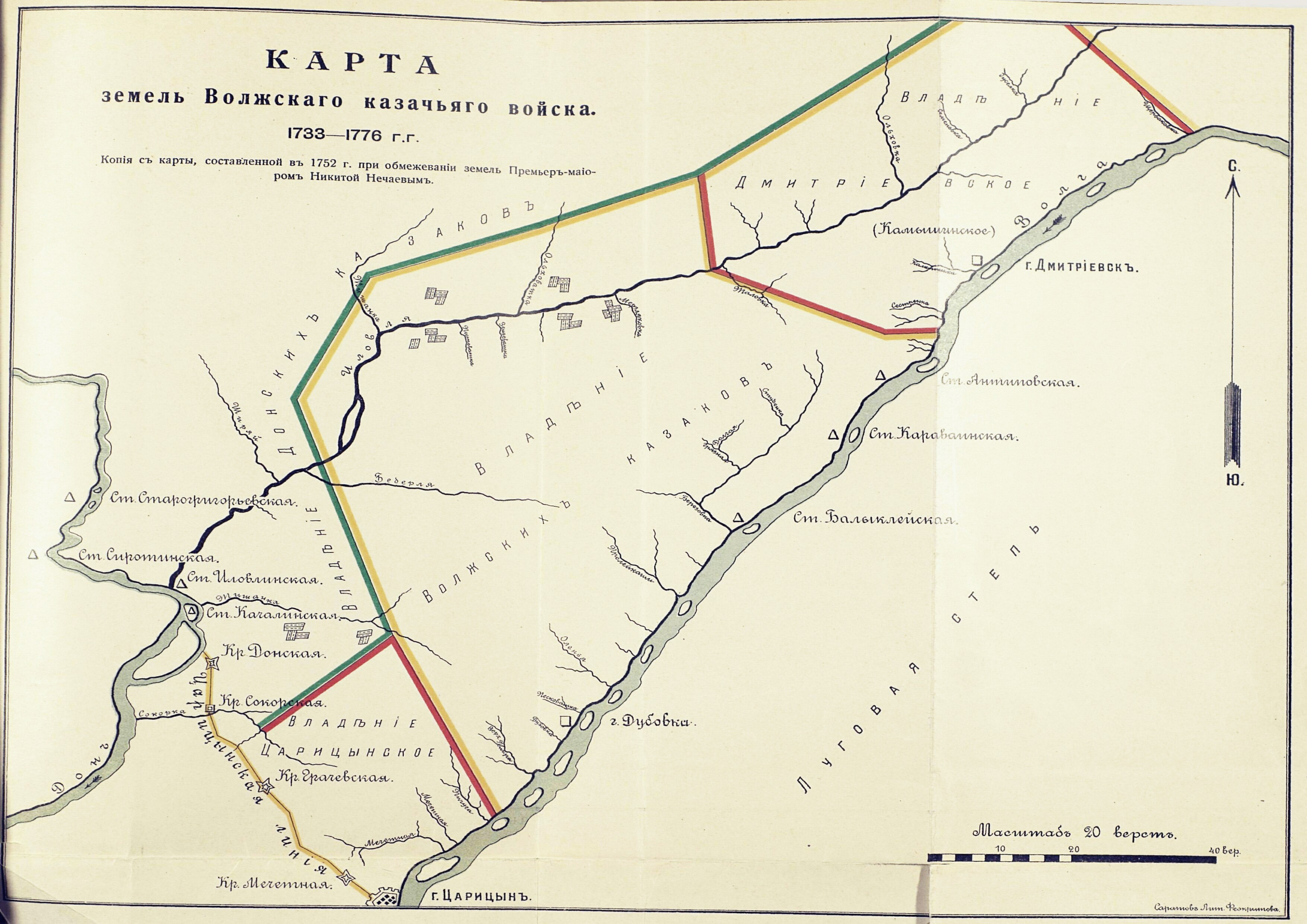
Map shows the location of Volga cossacks between 1733-1778

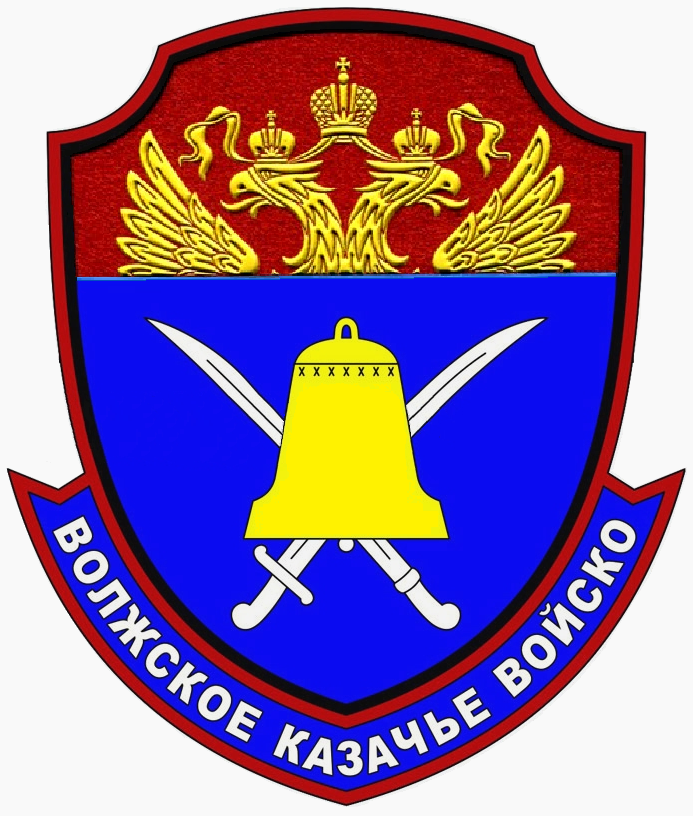
Emblem of registered Volga cossacks
