= Topolčani =

Topolčani/Topolchani Тополчани
- Village
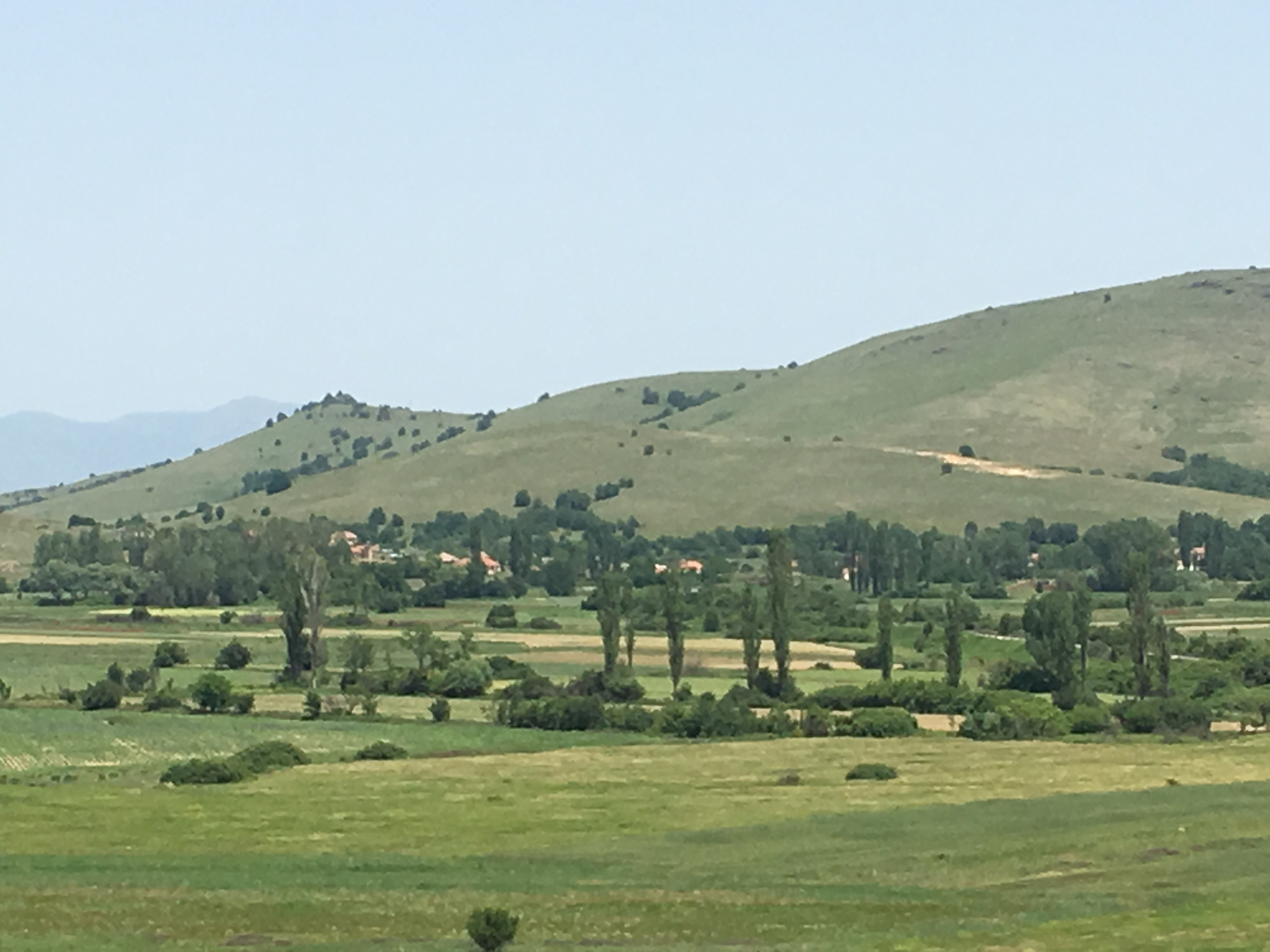
- Topolcani, Prilep Municipality, North Macedonia

- Location within North Macedonia
- Country: North Macedonia
- Region: Pelagonia
- Municipality: Prilep
- Elevation: 620 m (2,030 ft)

Population (2002)
  - Total: 449
- Time zone: UTC+1 (CET)
- Area code: +389/48/4XXXXX

Topolcani (Macedonian: Тополчани) is a village in the Prilep Municipality of North Macedonia. It used to be a municipality itself and its FIPS code was MKA7.

== History ==
The letter addressing the villagers from Topolčani: "Brothers [from] Topolčani. As soon as you read this letter, we are fully convinced that you will become a little conscious and that you will wake up a little from your deep sleep, because you have fallen asleep with such a dream, and have forgotten what humanity is. I do not know you well; since when did you become Serbs? but I was surprised when I found out that you are Serbs. You know very well, brothers, that in Topolcani there are no Serbs, no Greeks, nor Bulgarians. We are Macedonians. Serbia for Serbia, Greece for Greece and Bulgaria for Bulgaria. Everyone who works will be. So, what is earned with his own sweat is sweet to him, as is our work. If you are looking for another state to command us, then Turkey is good for us. Know, brothers, that under another state it will be much worse for us. As you have sworn to work for the people's cause, you should not give up even a drop of your blood, you should not forget our brothers who have shed it over the years. It is very sad and shameful before the people, and also before Europe, because Europe knows where there are Serbs, Bulgarians and Greeks. You should not call yourselves Serbs, and remember how you talk to your children at home, because I am sure that you do not pronounce a single Serbian word, and do not forget what our fathers and grandfathers were like. So, what we have been since ancient times, that is what we are today, and therefore we are neither Serbs, nor Bulgarians, nor Greeks. Look at the surrounding villages, and then how can you call yourselves Serbs. It is a pity, brothers, that we are very simple, and because of that simplicity everything has accumulated in our heads... There are no Serbs here, so according to the Serbs here they have no place to work. The Serbs should work where they have their own people, there in Kosovo, which they call Old Serbia..." The original letter was translated in Serbian by the Serbian Consul in Bitola.

After the establishment of the Bulgarian Exarchate, Topolčani left the Greek Patriarchate and joined the Exarchate. According to Serbian sources, the Exarchate "Bulgarized" the school in the village in 1881. However, the Bulgarian teacher in the village was later expelled by the villagers. The Serbian authorities took advantage of the situation and sent two Serbian teachers in the village, which were funded directly by Serbia. The now-Serbian school in the village worked illegally and was closed several times by the Ottomans, until 1898 when it was finally legalized. The village, now under Serbian influence, left the Bulgarian Exarchate in 1890. According to Bulgarian sources, the priests in the village were bribed to switch side to Serbia.

In 1907, the IMRO revolutionary Pavle Naumov sent a letter addressing the villagers of Topolčani, where he tells them that in Topolčani there are no Serbs, nor Greeks, nor Bulgarians, but only Macedonians. The villagers answered the letter after 11 days, claiming that they and Europe are aware that they are Macedonians, but the neighboring states brainwashed the people by dividing it in more nations, and that they can't give up their Serbian feelings. Pavle Naumov responded to their letter, accusing them of being scared, and that foreign people scare them, forcing them being Serbs. The villagers didn't respond to this, and gave the letter to the Serbian consul in Bitola. He wrote to Belgrade that certain Bulgarian vojvode named Naumov sent a letter to the village of Topolčane, while the Bulgarian terrorist organization became aggressive and tried through letters, to persuade the village to join the Bulgarian side.

== Demographics ==
According to the 2002 census, the village had a total of 449 inhabitants. Ethnic groups in the village include:

- Macedonians 449
