= Vitolište =

Vitolište / Vitolishte Витолиште
- Village
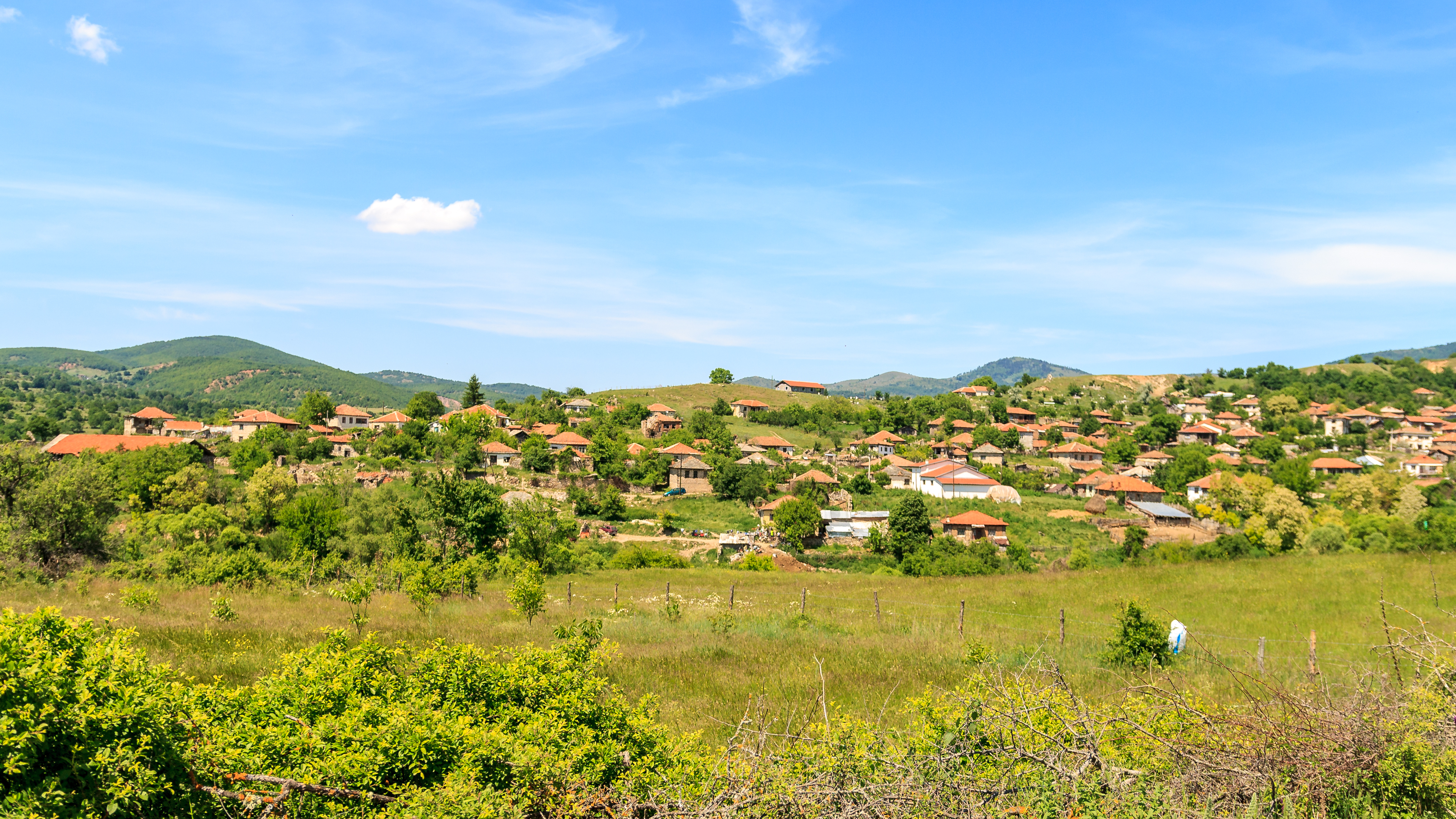
- Panoramic view of the village

- Location within North Macedonia
- Country: North Macedonia
- Region: Pelagonia
- Municipality: Prilep
- Elevation: 862 m (2,828 ft)

Population (2002)
  - Total: 170
- Time zone: UTC+1 (CET)
- Postal code: 7508
- Area code: +38948

Vitolište (Macedonian: Витолиште) is a village in the Prilep Municipality of North Macedonia. It used to be a municipality itself and its FIPS code was MKB5. It is the largest village in the Mariovo region.

== Demographics ==
According to the 2002 census, the village had a total of 170 inhabitants. Ethnic groups in the village include:

- Macedonians 167
- Serbs 2
- Others 1
