= Prilep Municipality =

Municipality of North Macedonia

Coordinates: 41.2878°N 21.6758°E

Municipality of Prilep Општина Прилеп
- Urban municipality
- Flag Coat of arms

- Country: North Macedonia
- Region: Pelagonia
- Municipal seat: Prilep

Government
  - Mayor: Dejan Prodanoski (VMRO-DPMNE)

Area
  - Total: 1,194.44 km^{2} (461.18 sq mi)

Population
  - Total: 69,025
  - Density: 64.27/km^{2} (166.5/sq mi)
- Time zone: UTC+1 (CET)
- Postal code: 2 7500
- Area code: 048
- Vehicle registration: PP
- Website: http://www.Prilep.gov.mk

Prilep (Macedonian: Прилеп [ˈpriːlɛp]) is a municipality in the south of North Macedonia. Prilep is also the name of the city where the municipal seat is found. It is located in the Pelagonia Statistical Region.

== Geography ==
The municipality borders Čaška and Dolneni municipalities to the north, Kavadarci Municipality to the east, Krivogaštani, Mogila and Novaci municipalities to the west, and Greece to the south.

The municipality spreads over the northeastern part of the Pelagonia valley, it takes contains much of the Mariovo region.

== Demographics ==
The population of the municipality is 69,025. According to the 2021 North Macedonia census the majority in the municipality is represented by the ethnics Macedonians.

| | 2002 | | 2021 | |
| | Number | % | Number | % |
| TOTAL | 76,768 | 100 | 69,025 | 100 |
| Macedonians | 70,878 | 92.33 | 58,349 | 84,53 |
| Roma | 4,433 | 5.77 | 3,966 | 5.75 |
| Turks | 917 | 1.19 | 1,060 | 1.54 |
| Albanians | 22 | 0.03 | 127 | 0.18 |
| Bosniaks | 86 | 0.11 | 117 | 0.17 |
| Serbs | 172 | 0.22 | 113 | 0.16 |
| Vlachs | 17 | 0.02 | 30 | 0.04 |
| Other / Undeclared / Unknown | 243 | 0.33 | 304 | 0.45 |
| Persons for whom data are taken from administrative sources | | | 4,959 | 7.18 |

== Inhabited places ==
The number of the inhabited places in the municipality is 59. There are one city and 58 villages. Many villages have small populations or are even abandoned.
