= Kale (disambiguation) =

Kale is a species of cabbage in which the central leaves do not form a head.

Kale may also refer to:

== Ethnography ==
- Kale, the Romani for "black", used as a self-designation by some groups of the Romani people:
  - Finnish Kale, the Romani people from Finland
  - Kale (Welsh Romanies), the Romani people from Wales

== Places ==
=== Former Ottoman Empire ===
Kale means 'fortified place' in Turkish.

==== Bosnia and Herzegovina ====
- Kale, Konjic

==== Crimea ====
- Chufut-Kale, cave-fortress

==== Macedonia ====
- Kale Fortress in Skopje

==== Romania ====
- Ada Kaleh (lit. 'Fortress Island' in Turkish), former Danube island

==== Serbia ====
- Kale-Krševica, an Ancient Greek town

==== Turkey ====
- Kale, Antalya
- Kale, Borçka
- Kale, Denizli
- Kale, Malatya

=== India ===
- Kale, Mawal, Pune district, Maharashtra

=== Iran ===
- Kale, Iran, a village in Qazvin Province

=== Myanmar ===
- Kale District, Sagaing Region
- Kale Township, Sagaing Region
- Kale, an alternative spelling for Kalay, Sagaing Region
- Kale, Kayin State

=== Slovenia ===
- Kale, Slovenia, a small village in the Municipality of Žalec

=== Nepal ===
- Kale, Nepal

=== United States ===
- Kale, West Virginia

== People ==
- Kale (name), a unisex first name used largely in the English and Hawaiian languages, and a surname

== Other uses ==
- Kale (moon), a moon of Jupiter
- Kale (Dragon Ball), a character from the Dragon Ball multimedia franchise
- Inspector Kale, a fictional police officer in the 1998 Indian film Gunda
- Kale, a local name for West African pepper
- HMS Kale, ships of Britain's navy
- Kale (mythology), one of the Charites (Graces), daughters of Zeus (Jupiter)
- KALE, a radio station on 960 AM licensed to Richland, Washington
- Ka le (gaming slang) or Kale, refers to lag (video games), often in in-game chat and Twitch

== See also ==
- Bowen's Kale
- Master Kale
- Kail (disambiguation)
- Cale (disambiguation)
- Qaleh (disambiguation)
- Kalo (disambiguation)
