= Qaleh =

Qaleh or Qalʻeh (Persian: قلعه) may refer to:

- Qal'a, meaning 'fortress'

== Ardabil Province ==
- Qaleh, Ardabil, a village in Ardabil Province, Iran

== Fars Province ==
- Qaleh, Fars, a village in Jahrom County
- Qaleh Kharabeh, Fars, a village in Sepidan County

== Gilan Province ==
- Qaleh, Gilan, a village in Gilan Province, Iran

== East Azerbaijan Province ==
- Qaleh, Azarshahr, a village in East Azerbaijan Province, Iran
- Qaleh, Bostanabad, a village in East Azerbaijan Province, Iran
- Qaleh, alternate name of Qaleh-ye Olya, a village in Bostanabad County, East Azerbaijan Province, Iran
- Qaleh, Maragheh, a village in East Azerbaijan Province, Iran
- Qaleh, Meyaneh, a village in East Azerbaijan Province, Iran

== Hormozgan Province ==
- Qaleh, Hormozgan, a village in Hormozgan Province, Iran

== Kerman Province ==
- Qaleh Rural District, in Kerman Province

== Kermanshah Province ==
- Qaleh, Kermanshah, a village in Kermanshah Province, Iran

== Khuzestan Province ==
- Qaleh, Ahvaz, a village in Khuzestan Province, Iran
- Qaleh, Omidiyeh, a village in Khuzestan Province, Iran

== Kurdistan Province ==
- Qaleh, Kamyaran, a village in Kamyaran County
- Qaleh, Kurdistan, a village in Qorveh County

== Lorestan Province ==
- Posht Qaleh, Lorestan, a village in Lorestan Province, Iran

== Markazi Province ==
- Qaleh, Khomeyn, a village in Khomeyn County
- Qaleh, alternate name of Qaleh-ye Azraj, Markazi Province, Iran
- Qaleh, alternate name of Gozal Darreh, Markazi Province, Iran

== Mazandaran Province ==
- Qaleh, Babol, a village in Mazadaran Province, Iran
- Qaleh, Sari, a village in Mazadaran Province, Iran

== North Khorasan Province ==
- Pish Qaleh, a city in North Khorasan Province, Iran

== Qazvin Province ==
- Qaleh, Buin Zahra, a village in Qazvin Province, Iran
- Qaleh, Qazvin, a village in Qazvin Province, Iran

== Semnan Province ==
- Dibaj, a city in Semnan Province, Iran
- Qaleh Kharabeh, Semnan, a village in Semnan Province, Iran

== West Azerbaijan Province ==
- Qaleh Sardar, West Azerbaijan, a village in West Azerbaijan Province, Iran
- Qaleh Bozorg, a village in West Azerbaijan Province

== Zanjan Province ==
- Qaleh, Abhar, a village in Zanjan Province, Iran
- Qaleh, Khodabandeh, a village in Zanjan Province, Iran
- Qaleh, Zanjan, a village in Zanjan Province, Iran

== See also ==
- Qaleh is a common element in Iranian place names; see
