= List of castles in North Macedonia =

This is a partial list of castles and fortresses in North Macedonia.

- Arangel Fortress
- Bansko Fortress
- Belica Fortress
- Bučin Fortress
- Budinarci Fortress
- Creška Fortress
- Čučer Fortress
- Debar Fortress
- Debrešte Fortress
- Demir Kapija Fortress
- Desovo Fortress
- Devič Fortress
- Dolna Lešnica Fortress
- Dolno Oreovo Fortress
- Dramče Fortress
- Drenovo Fortress
- Evla Fortress
- Gabrovo Fortress
- Godivje Fortress
- Gorna Banjica Fortress
- Gradec Fortress
- Gradište Fortress
- Graište Fortress
- Ižište Fortress
- Jegunovce Fortress
- Kalište Fortress
- Kanarevo Fortress
- Kičevo Fortress
- Konče Fortress
- Konjuh Fortress
- Kosturino Fortress
- Kožle Fortress
- Krupište Fortress
- Lešok Fortress
- Lukovica Fortress
- Manastir Fortress
- Markova Sušica Fortress
- Matka Fortress
- Mlado Nagoričane Fortress
- Mordište Fortress
- Morodvis Fortress
- Opila Fortress
- Oraše Fortress
- Pesočani Fortress
- Podvis Fortress
- Marko's Towers
- Radoviš Fortress
- Resava Fortress
- Rogle Fortress
- Samuil's Fortress
- Kale Fortress
- Sopot Fortress
- Šopur Fortress
- Srbinovo Fortress
- Stenče Fortress
- Stenje Fortress
- Štip Fortress
- Streževo Fortress
- Strumica Fortress
- Tetovo Fortress
- Treskavec Fortress
- Valandovo Fortress
- Varoš Fortress
- Veles Fortress
- Vinica Fortress
- Virče Fortress
- Vodno Fortress
- Zagrad Fortress
- Zdunje Fortress
- Železnec Fortress
- Zgratčani Fortress
- Živojno Fortress
- Zletovo Fortress
- Zovik Fortress
- Zrze Fortress
- Zvegor Fortress

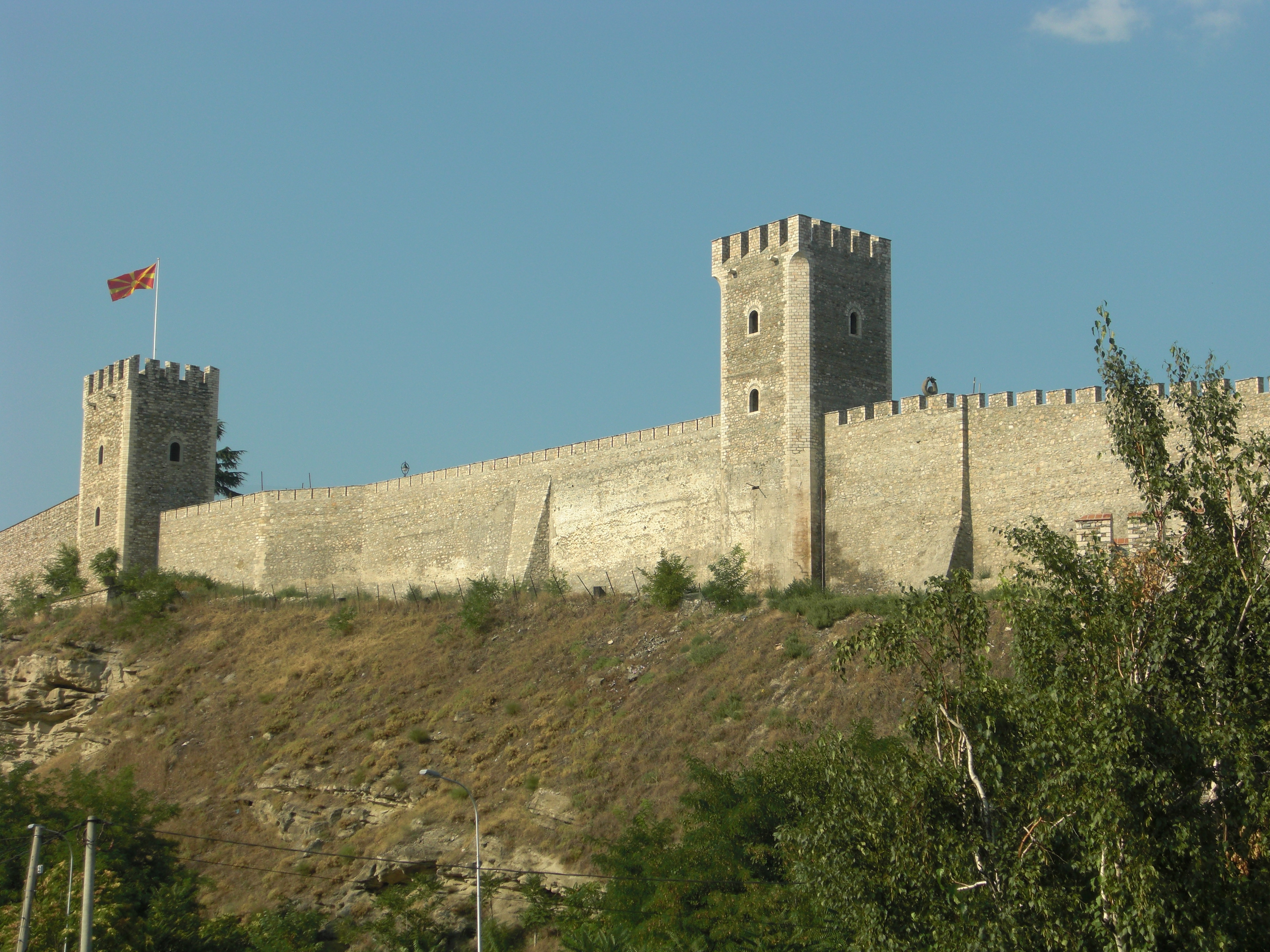
Kale Fortress in Skopje

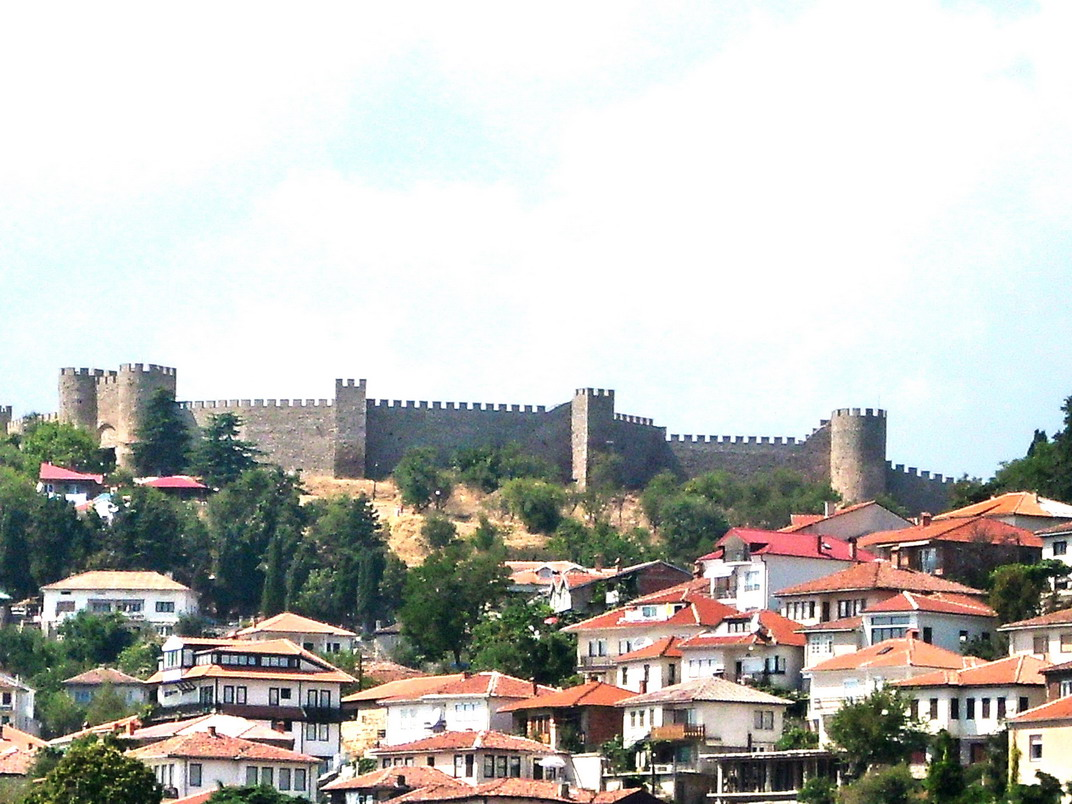
Samuil's Fortress over the old town in Ohrid

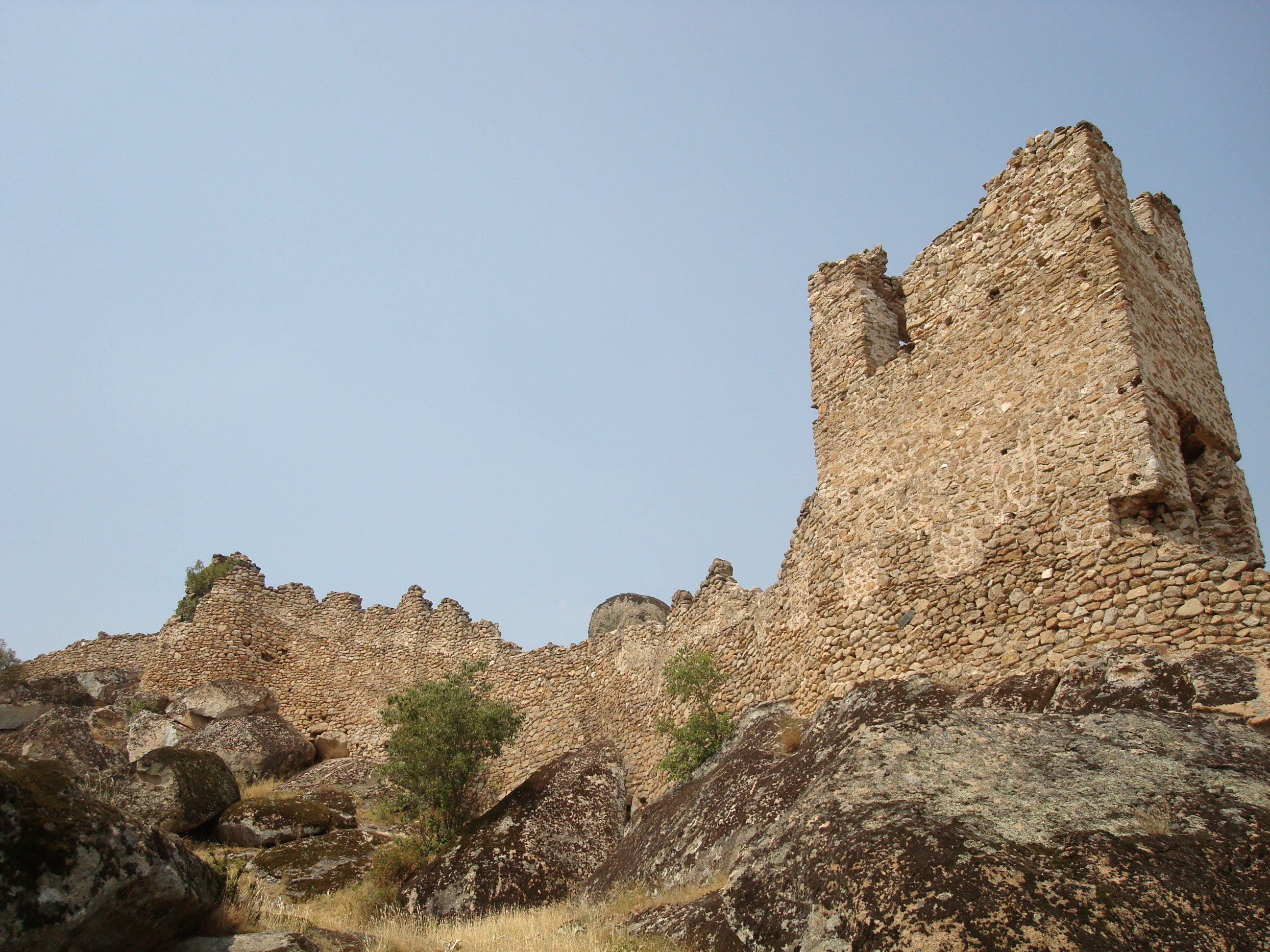
Ruins at Marko's Tower near Prilep

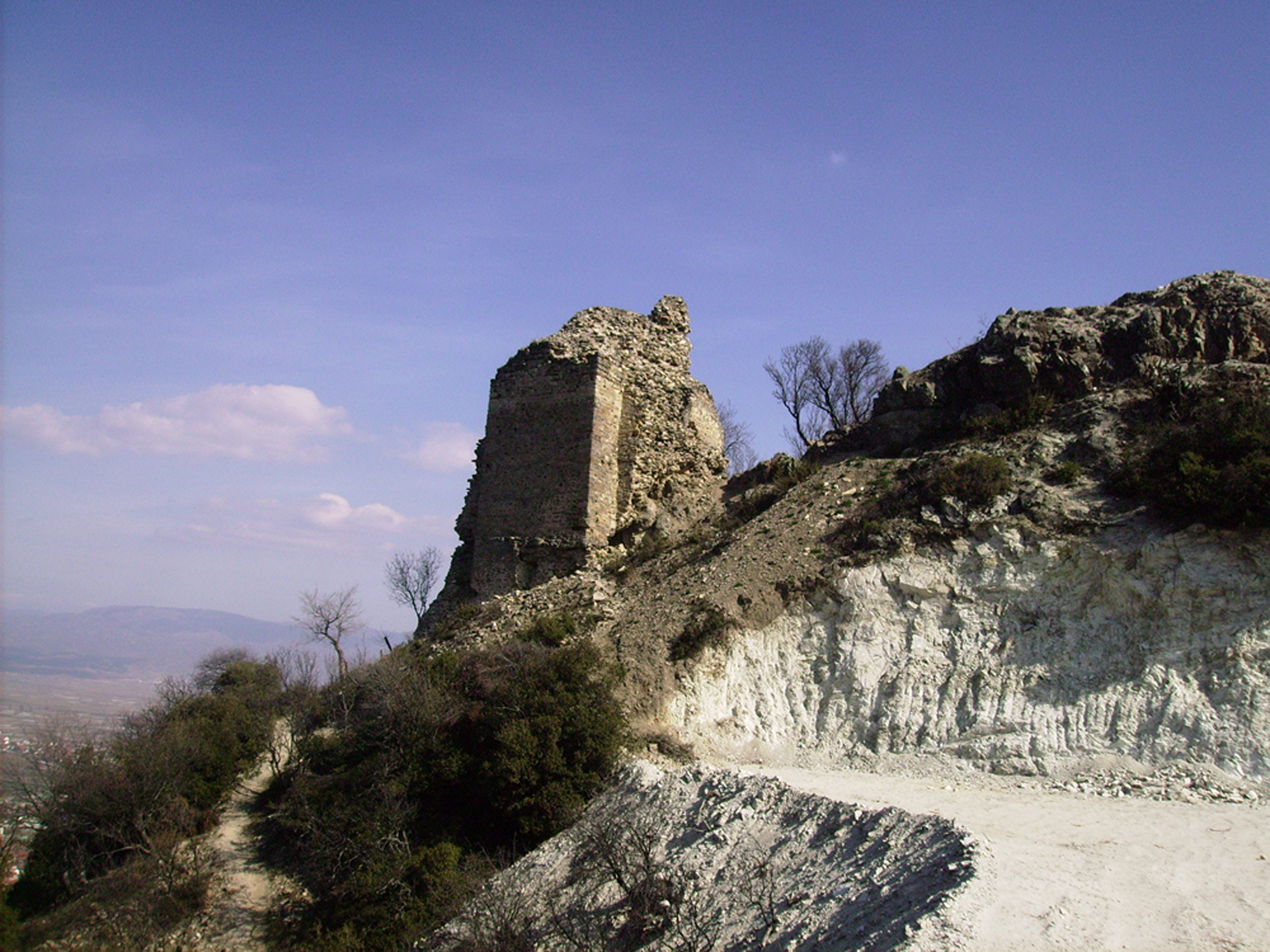
Ruins at Czar's Towers in Strumica

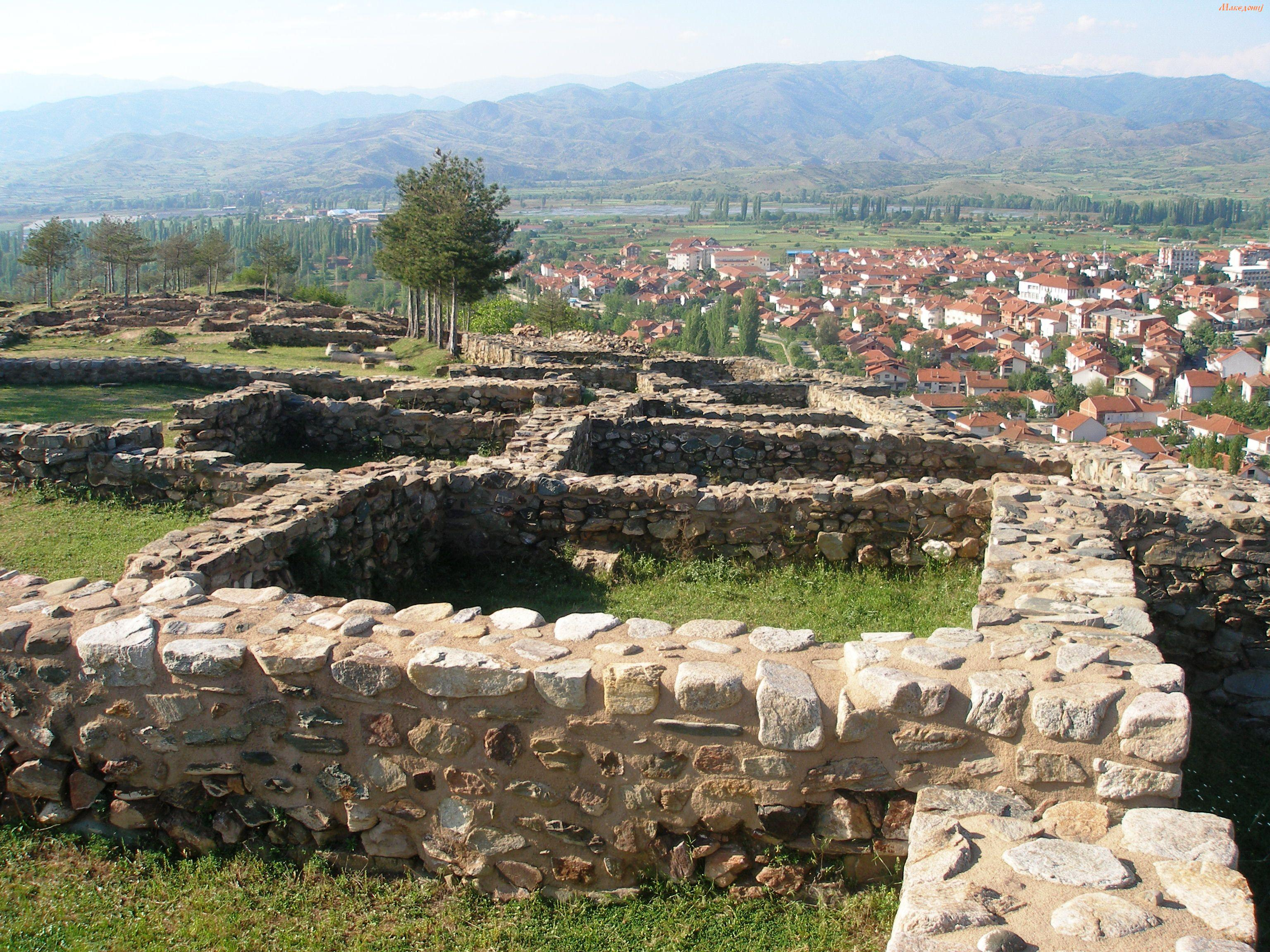
Viničko Kale ruins overlooking Vinica

== See also ==
- List of castles
- List of castles in Europe
- Fortress
- History of North Macedonia
