= Strumica Fortress =

Czar's Towers Цареви Кули
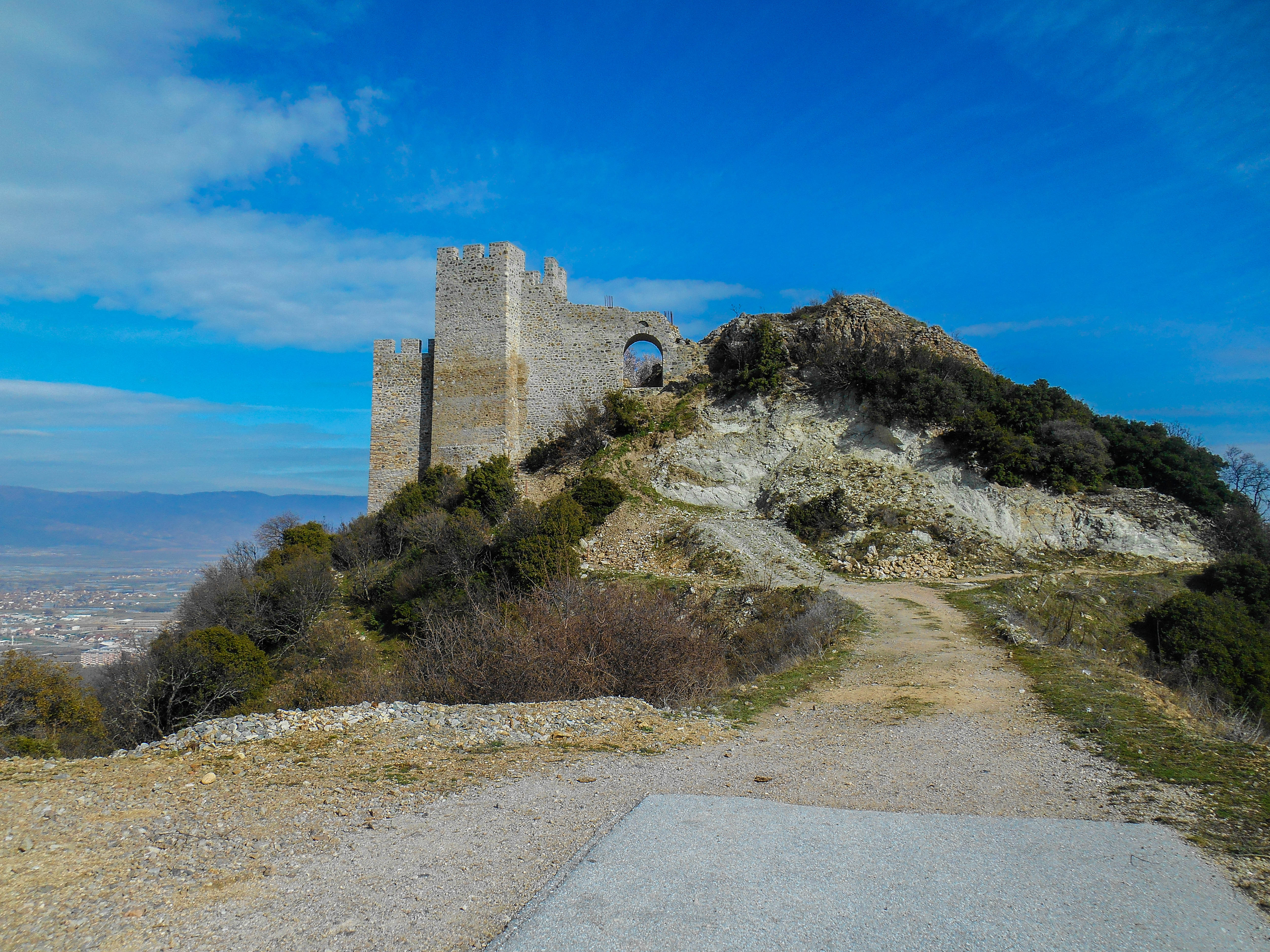
- The North Tower
- Interactive map of the Czar's Towers; Цареви Кули area

General information
- Location: Strumica, North Macedonia
- Coordinates: 41.4323°N 22.6298°E

The Strumica Fortress (Macedonian: Струмичко Кале, Strumičko Kale), better known as the Czar's Towers (Macedonian: Цареви Кули, Carevi Kuli), is a historical complex in eastern North Macedonia, overlooking the city of Strumica.

== Prehistory ==
=== Copper Age ===
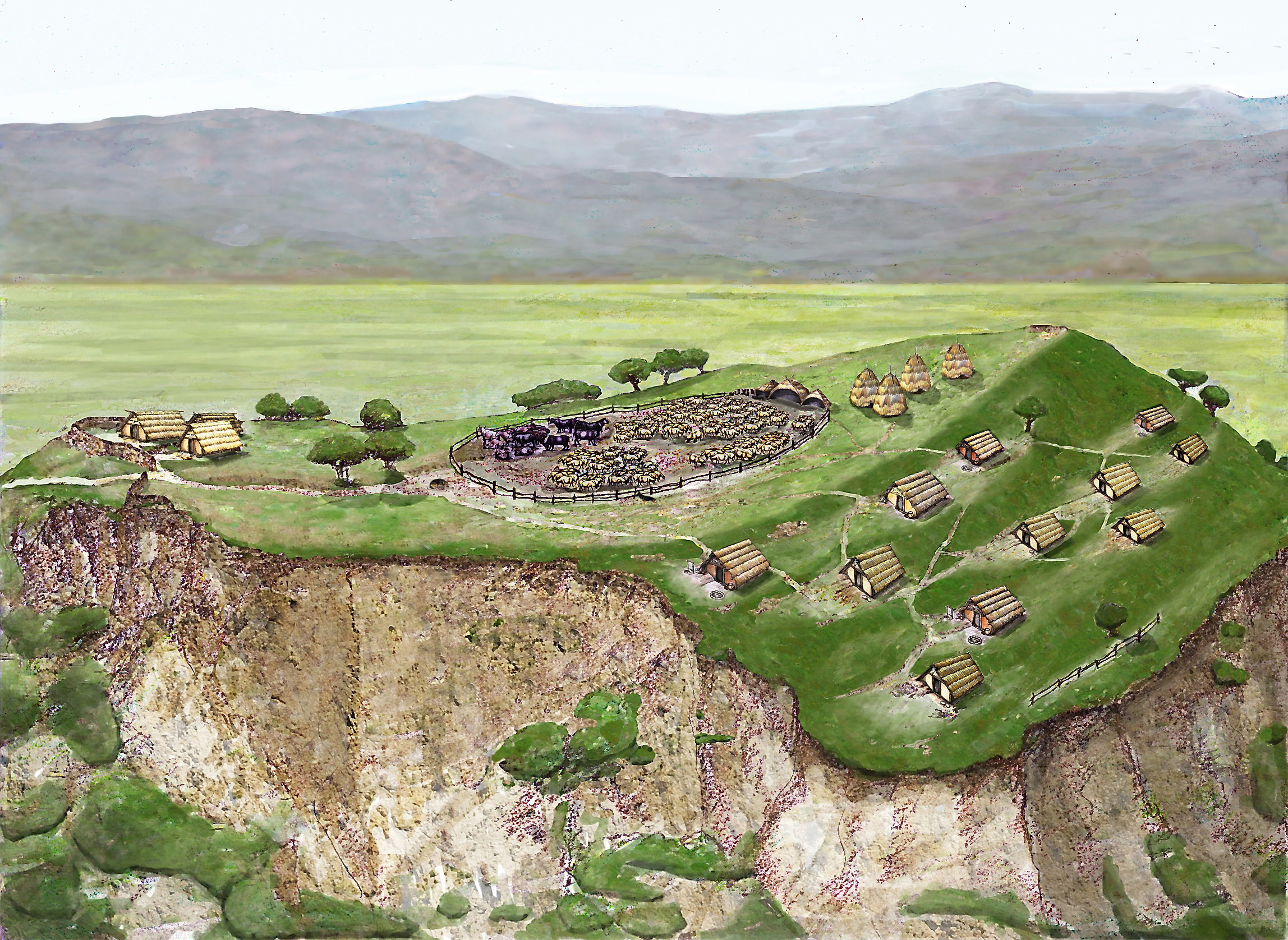
Drawing with the possible appearance of the Chalcolithic settlement of Carevi Kuli

The initial layer of the continuous settlement of the Carevi Kuli site represents the time of the Chalcolithic, i.e. the Copper Age. During the first half of the 5th millennium BC, the first settlement specific to the early phases of the Chalcolithic was built on top of the hill. The prehistoric settlement is of the hillfort type and is located on a terrace on the southeastern slope, on the edges of the northwestern plateau and on the South Hill (Južen Rid) site. Research has shown that the settlement was single-layered, with a strongly pronounced central, acropolis part and lower terraces, radially distributed around the central space. The living facilities were placed on the edges around the plateau and the southeastern slope, while the central part was probably where the livestock were enclosed in enclosures. During the research campaign, in the sector of the southeastern slope and the northwestern rampart, several structures partially dug into the terrace were investigated. The above-ground parts of the walls seem to have had a light construction, made of wattle and daub. The roof of these buildings was probably made of branches, reeds and straw.

Material culture is composed of artifacts that had a certain role in the daily activities of the prehistoric population. The objects found during the research testify to a fully established settlement within which lived a community that knew well the technological processes of processing ceramics, stone and possibly even metal. Judging by the findings, the people in the settlement, in addition to construction, animal husbandry and agriculture, were also engaged in spinning, weaving, pottery and making tools from stone, flint, bone and horn. The main characteristic of Chalcolithic pottery is decoration with graphite painting and carved lines.

The overall knowledge about the Chalcolithic culture of Carevi Kuli speaks in favor of clearly defined religious concepts that had a significant role in the life of the prehistoric population. The largest number of cult objects is made up of anthropomorphic figurines and to a lesser extent cult tables, amulets, spindle whorls and certain objects that do not have a clear purpose. One of the most significant finds at the Carevi Kuli site is the oldest metal tool awl, found in situ at the sites in Macedonia.

Judging by its overall material characteristics, the Chalcolithic culture of Carevi Kuli belongs to the complex that culturally unites the area between the rivers Struma and Vardar. In Macedonia, this complex is known as Carevi Kuli-Burilchevo-Spanchevo. In the Struma River valley, this culture is known as the Gradeshnica-Slatino-Dikili Tash II cultural complex.

=== Bronze Age ===
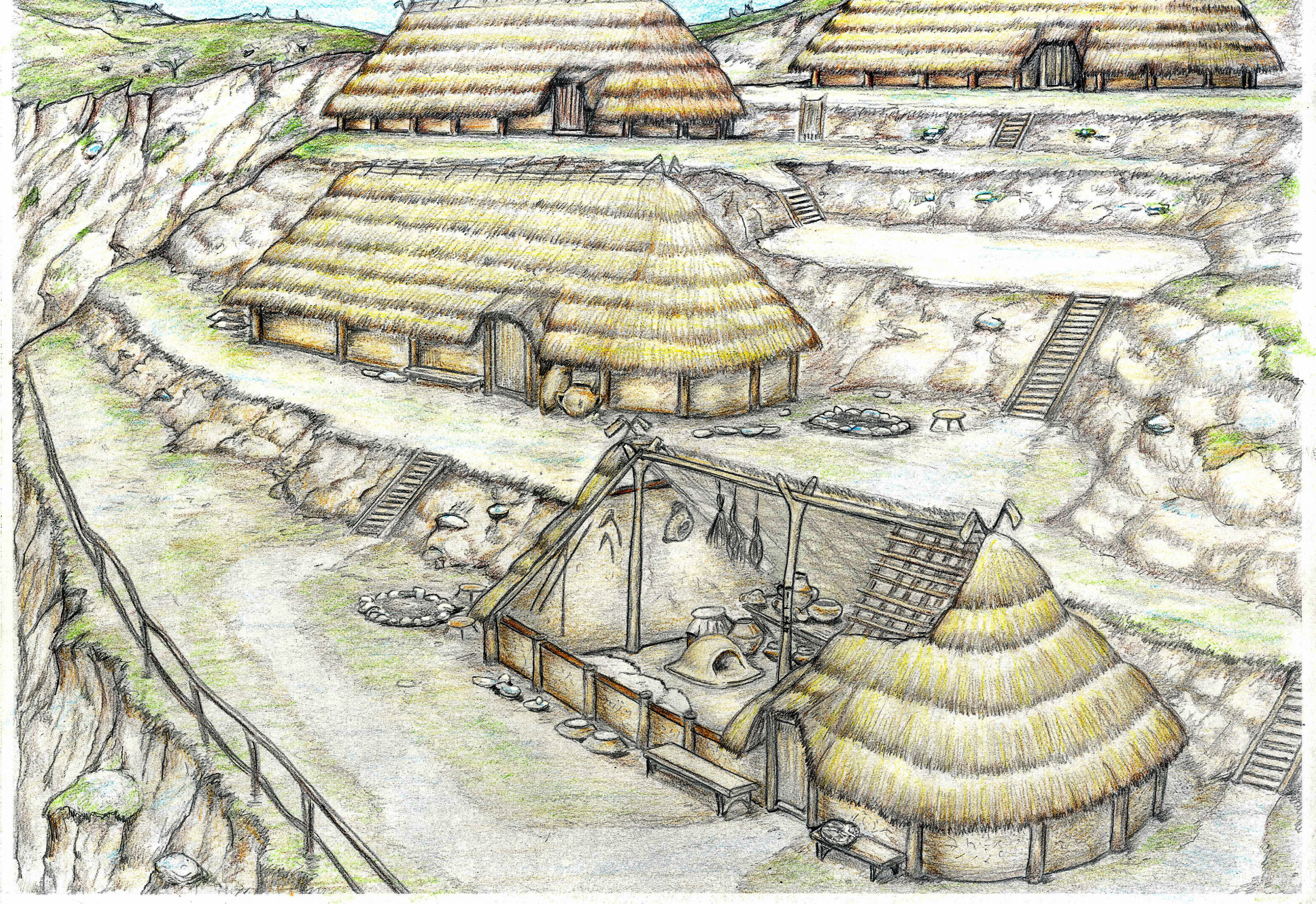
Drawing with the possible appearance of the Middle Bronze Age settlement of Carevi Kuli

Towards the end of the 3rd millennium BC, the bearers of the Early Bronze Age began the second phase of continuous settlement of the Carevi Kuli site. Research on the southeastern slope showed that the Bronze Age settlement emerged immediately above the strata from the Chalcolithic era. Such settlements are known as hillfort type, i.e. settlements positioned on high and inaccessible hills that dominate the surroundings. The research revealed two phases of living in the settlement from the Early Bronze Age. The buildings were placed on terraces cut into the slope.

The next stage in the development of the prehistoric culture of Carevi Kuli belongs to the Middle Bronze Age. Immediately above the younger residential phase of the Early Bronze Age, the settlement of the Middle Bronze Age was formed, in apparent continuity. The residential horizon from this phase shows differences in the organization of the buildings which, in this period, were organized independently and placed on different terraces. In most buildings, the terrace was artificially cut into the rock and the buildings were built with stakes. The buildings from the time of the Middle Bronze Age were above ground and, most likely, they were built with wooden construction. Unlike the Early Bronze ones, at least one of the buildings had an apse on the eastern side.

The material culture, mainly consisting of common Bronze Age pottery, connects the settlement from the Early Bronze Age with the settlements from the north and that from the Middle Bronze Age with the settlements from the south. Among those from the Middle Bronze Age, the most impressive are the vessels with so-called wishbone handles and those richly decorated with geometric carvings. The chronological, geographical and cultural affiliation of the finds from the Middle Bronze Age connects the prehistoric settlement of Carevi Kuli with the so-called Minoan culture.

=== Iron Age ===
Sporadic findings from the Early Iron Age have been recorded at the Carevi Kuli site. The largest part consists of finds of pottery, above all, bowls with a channeled rim, jugs decorated with hatched hanging triangles, portable ovens (pyraunoi), etc.

It seems that the waves of the Aegean migrations also passed through these parts, but they remained on the site for a very short time. The top of the hill at that time was probably a point from where the waves of migration continued their march toward the rich settlements of the Aegean.

== History ==
=== Antiquity ===
==== Early Antiquity ====
Towards the end of the 5th century BC, the locality was used again by the population that built the first urban settlement at the foot of Carevi Kuli under the foundations of today's Strumica. Most likely, these were Paeonian tribes which, sometime at the beginning of the 4th century BC, fell under the domination of the ancient Macedonian state. Judging by the material findings, the first conquest of these areas probably took place under Amyntas III so that already under Philip II and Alexander III these areas were fully integrated within the Macedonian state.

Archaeological excavations on the top of the hill revealed five large pits, placed in the direction of the stretch of the ridge, that is, in the northeast–southwest direction. These pits were filled with exceptional material from the Еarly Antiquity period. Judging by the archaeological material, the first large pits appear at the end of the 5th and the beginning of the 4th century BC. The pits, carved in limestone and sandy rock, have a pear-shaped shape and a circular base and are of different sizes and depths. The largest of them, Pit 5, is 5.4 meters wide and 4 meters deep. Unlike the large ancient pits, archaeological excavations at the top of the hill did not indicate concrete remains of any other construction from the same era. An exception is a rectangular object carved into the rock, which is located near Pit 5 and is organically connected to it.

The material filled in the pits consisting antique and grey Paeonian pottery (amphora, kylix, skyphos, kantharos, askos, aryballos, bowls, plates, etc.), coins, jewelry, remains of weapons (arrows and almond-shaped slingshots), etc. Judging by the temporal context, the content and the location of the pits, as well as their imposing size, the ancient pits can most likely be associated with the practice of rituals within certain cult activities dedicated to some ancient deities.

It seems that the Carevi Kuli plateau, during the 5th-4th centuries BC, was used as a sanctuary, that is, a kind of temenos, where the population of the ancient city, under the foundations of today's Strumica, practiced religious and cult activities.

==== Hellenistic period ====
A significant horizon from the Hellenistic period was found on the area of the southeastern and northwestern plateau. It seems that this horizon also functioned after the Roman conquests of these regions. In this era, the first significant remains of architecture also appear. These are buildings built of stone in the drywall technique. The finds in the cultural layers of the buildings and around them undoubtedly belong to the Hellenistic period. A ceramic lamp with a relief floral representation covered with black glaze from the 3rd – 2nd century BC was found in one of the buildings. Near these buildings, just below the remains of the medieval rampart, the remains of pithos appeared. Ceramic material from the Hellenistic period, as well as coins from the autonomous mints of the Macedonian cities, were also investigated in this position. It seems that the first phase of the buildings probably originates from the 3rd – 2nd century BC, and the second phase, which was built carelessly and hastily, is from the period of Roman domination. In addition to the study of the settlement in the time of the Hellenistic epoch, the necropolis of the South Hill (Južen Rid) locality also testifies. Its use probably started in the Early Antiquity period.

In the repertoire of ceramics from the Hellenistic period of Carevi Kuli, in addition to a significant amount of ceramic vessels, finds of terracotta models of altar and figurines of Cybele and Hermes appeared. In addition, coins and jewelry finds were found, the most striking of which were gold earrings with a representation of a lion and African heads and a ring with a woman's head.

==== Roman Empire ====
After the end of the Third Roman-Macedonian War (171-168 BC) and the defeat of the Macedonian king Perseus by the Roman consul L. Aemilius Paulus, in the battle of Pydna, Macedonia was permanently conquered by the Romans.

During the Republican and Early Empire periods, there is a reduction in construction activities at Carevi Kuli. Only a few buildings were explored on the plateau, as well as the remains of walls that are unequivocally associated with the Roman period.

Research in this area has brought to light several rectangular buildings made of stone and mud. The buildings are preserved in a rather dilapidated state, which is a consequence of the damage caused by the destructive processes of the later construction activities. The buildings contain a significant amount of findings originating from the first two centuries. Unfortunately, the function of the objects is not known. Based on the discovered movable material, there is a possibility that these are residential buildings or, on the other hand, buildings with an economic purpose in which foodstuffs were stored.The buildings were demolished towards the end of the 3rd century, probably as a result of the Gothic-Heruleian devastation in 268/269, when most cities in this part of the Balkans suffered.

In the Roman layers of Carevi Kuli, a variety of craft-art products were found, consisting of a bronze statuette with a stylized representation of Mercury, jewelry, utilitarian objects, etc. Of the pottery products, the printed pottery is striking and a tombstone was also found - a medallion with an inscription indicating a priest of the cult of Artemis.

==== Late Antiquity ====
Archeological research has shown that the first solidly built fortification of Carevi Kuli emerged during late antiquity. It is a powerful castron which, in addition to the guard service, also served as a refuge for the local population, i.e. as a place where the inhabitants of the ancient city on the site of today's Strumica could quickly and safely take refuge in times of great danger. This fortification was built at the end of the 3rd or the beginning of the 4th century. Then, probably, the first solidly built ramparts were erected, discovered in several positions around the plateau. Given the strong rampart fortification and the rich reserves of water and food, which were stored within the fortress, the citizens of the ancient city at the foot of Carevi Kuli could stay here for months.

The biggest confirmation of the intensified activity in the late antique fortress of Carevi Kuli is the existence of a large late antique necropolis in the South Hill (Južen Rid) sector. The guards were buried in it, along with their family members. Research has shown that the hill began to be used for burials at the end of the 3rd and the beginning of the 4th century, probably after the construction of the late antique fortress of Carevi Kuli. Burials were carried out until the first half of the 5th century. Judging by the material remains, first of all, the coins minted in the time of Maurice (582–602), this fortress above the city will function until the eighties of the 6th century when it will probably be abandoned.

The layers from late antiquity, that is, the Early Byzantine horizon, represent one of the richest and most diverse periods in the material culture of the Carevi Kuli site. As with all other cultural layers, pottery is the most numerous fund of findings. Numismatic finds jewelry, objects made of glass, lamps, objects used in everyday life, objects made of bone and horn and to a lesser extent, weapons, follow.

=== Middle Ages ===
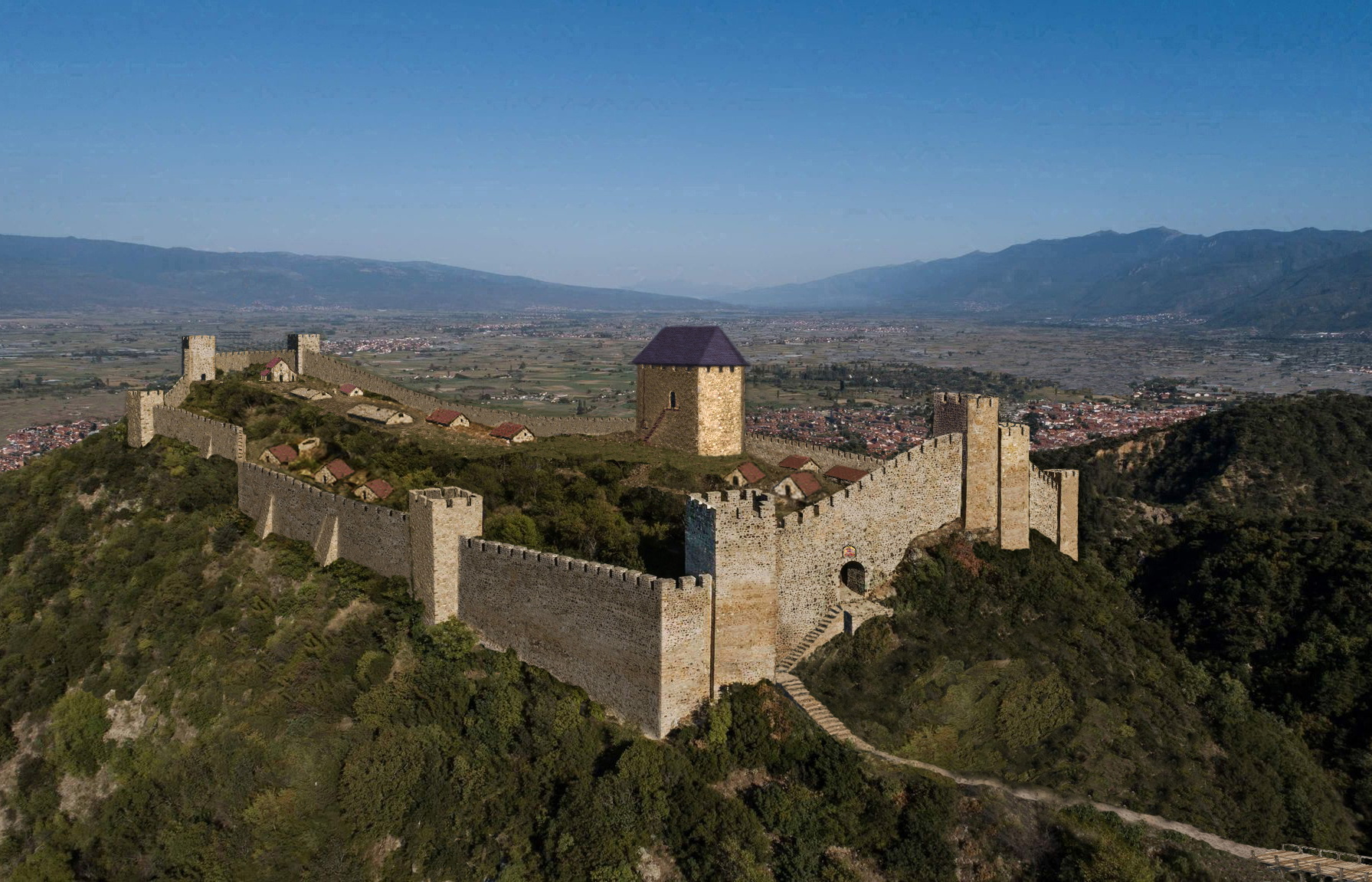
Digital reconstruction of the medieval fortress of Carevi Kuli

The fate of the late antique fortress in the period of the Early Middle Ages, from the beginning of the 7th century until the end of the 10th century, is not known. The youngest medieval horizon of Carevi Kuli was formed at the end of the 10th and the beginning of the 11th century. Almost nothing is known about its preservation, in the dawn of First Bulgarian State, but it can be assumed that, towards the end of the 10th and the beginning of the 11th century, it was still in a solid state.

The exact time of the construction of the Carevi Kuli medieval fortress is not known. That information is not recorded anywhere, nor is the fortress mentioned under that name in some historical sources. However, many data support the opinion that the fortress was built during the Komnenian restoration, somewhere towards the end of the11th or the beginning of the 12th century. Bearing in mind the danger of the Crusaders, the Uzis, the Pechenegs, and the Cumans, the emperors of the Byzantine lineage of the Komnenians directed their energies towards the organization of the defensive power in this part of the Byzantinе Empire. That the fortress began to be built shortly after the First Crusade is also evidenced by the fact of the large concentration of the Byzantinе army in these parts at the end of the 11th century. This information is faithfully recorded in the Monastery of the Most Holy Virgin - Eleusa (Tenderness) in Veljusa.

Judging by the research, the activities in the fortress recorded the greatest rise during the reign of the independent lords Dobromir Hrs and Strez, i.e. towards the end of the 12th and the beginning of the 13th century. After this period, these regions would find themselves at the center of military conflicts, often under different rulers. This situation will remain until 1261 when, after the restoration of the Byzantine Empire, the circumstances will finally stabilize. Towards the end of the thirties of the 14th century, this area was briefly occupied by the independent lord Hrelya, and from 1332 it fell under Serbian rule. Serbian rulers ruled this area almost until the end of the 14th century.

The medieval fortress Carevi Kuli was a complex fortification that, in addition to the military crew, also had civilians who performed certain tasks related to daily activities. It belonged to a series of important fortified places in the Macedonian Middle Ages, among which it stood out for its size, specific position, and extraordinary strategic importance. Its size was conditioned by the natural terrain conditions, to which the builders had to adapt. Built on the elongated saddle peak of one of the eastern branches of the hills of Mount Elenica, the medieval fortress has an elongated oval shape.

The basic conception of the medieval fortress is the rampart, strengthened by at least five and at most seven towers (the number of towers cannot be determined due to the landslides that took away a large part of the fortification architecture). The longer sides of the fortress are placed on the northeast–southwest axis. The length of the fortress is 230 m, while the greatest width is 80 m. The total perimeter of the medieval walls, together with the defensive towers, is about 550 m. At the time it was active, its area was about 1.15 hectares.

The fortress was best defended at the western entrance, where it was fortified with three towers, spaced from each other at the distance of javelin throw. At this position, the defense is additionally strengthened by an artificially dug deep trench-fossa.

On the central part is the largest building - the Central Defense Tower-Pyrgos. This tower functioned as the command center of the defense, and at the same time, it was also the command post of the elder of the fortress. In its interior were the chambers of the elderly and warehouses where food and weapons were stored, and in the basement, there was an atmospheric water cistern.

In its immediate vicinity to the west are the remains of a smaller building coated with hydrostatic plaster. This object is most likely a small cistern that was used for the Central defense tower. On the southeastern plateau are spread the housing facilities for the fort's crew, and it is thought that here, leaning on the southeastern rampart, was the building for the fort's commander. In the center of the plateau, several other buildings served as housing. The large cistern, or granarium, is also located here. On the north side is the medieval church, and to the west of it several buildings for housing, and food storage, as well as a cistern with a well. On the other hand, it is possible that the workshops were located on the northwestern plateau, as well as some other smaller ancillary buildings connected to them. Due to the need for additional amounts of water, another cistern was made here to collect atmospheric water.

The cultural layers from the medieval period of Carevi Kuli are distinguished by a multitude of archaeological findings that represent material confirmation of the intense life within the fortress and around it. The complex stratigraphic situation is determined by two significant horizons relating to the Byzantine conquest of Bulgaria and the period of the existence of the medieval fortress(from the end of the 11th century to the end of the 14th century). During the Middle Ages, the area of the medieval fortress was transformed into a military environment whose character, in addition to the architectural assemblage of material remains, was also determined by various objects of material culture. This material, to the greatest extent, is composed of ceramic objects, first of all, dishes, pots, and tableware, then remains of jewelry, objects related to personal piety, weapons, equipment, tools, and coins, as well as objects used in utilitarian activities.

=== Ottoman Empire ===
With the taking over of these regions by the Ottomans, in the spring of 1395, a new chapter in the history of Carevi Kuli-Strumica was opened.

Carevi Kuli's fortress experienced several changes at that time. After the conquest of Strumica by the Ottomans, the position of the fortress changed significantly because it remained deep in the territory of the Ottoman Empire and gradually lost its military-strategic significance. However, in the 15th century, it still had its defensive character, as evidenced by some buildings and findings from archaeological research. This phase is also witnessed by the small building known as "the small church" located on the western deep slope, fifty meters below the fortress.

From the documents of the time, it is known that at the beginning of the 15thcentury, the Ottomans repaired a large number of fortresses and placed garrisons and a huge military-administrative apparatus in them. In the following years, the Ottomans had their garrisons in Skopje, Kičevo, and Prilep, as well as in the Strumica fortress. It seems that during the 15th century, the fortress above Strumica was further strengthened, and at certain positions, new buildings were erected for the fortress crew.

One of the greatest Turkish travel writers, Evliya Çelebi, visited Strumica in 1670. He also mentions the fortress above the Strumica in his writings. He wrote about them that they were abandoned since Strumica was in the center of the Ottoman Empire, that the fortress started to collapse recently, and that only a few soldiers - martolos - were staying in it. From the records of Evlija Çelebi, it is known that there was neither a permanent army nor houses in the fortress.

The archaeological researches of the fortress have shown that with the arrival of the Ottomans certain changes took place in the fortress itself. It is assumed that a part of the medieval buildings was demolished, some of them were adapted, and completely new ones were built. On the southeastern plateau there are two buildings that have arectangular base. These buildings represent the houses of the fortress crew or had a religious and administrative character. Considering the relatively small number of buildings, it is considered that during this period a small crew was concentrated in the fortress. This is also confirmed by historical sources, which state that in the 16th century, a crew of ten members stayed in it.

The researches of the Late Medieval layers of Carevi Kuli, gave birth to many finds that are connected with the Ottoman Middle Ages. The largest number of them are related to the daily activities of the military crew, and are composed of Late Medieval and Ottoman pottery. A small amount is made up of jewelry finds, consisting exclusively of rings, and several utilitarian objects that were used in everyday activities are also recorded. As part of the research, coins were also found, consisting mostly of akças. Lead bullets of firearms, i.e. flintlock guns and rifles, are also specific findings for this epoch.

=== 19th to 21st century ===
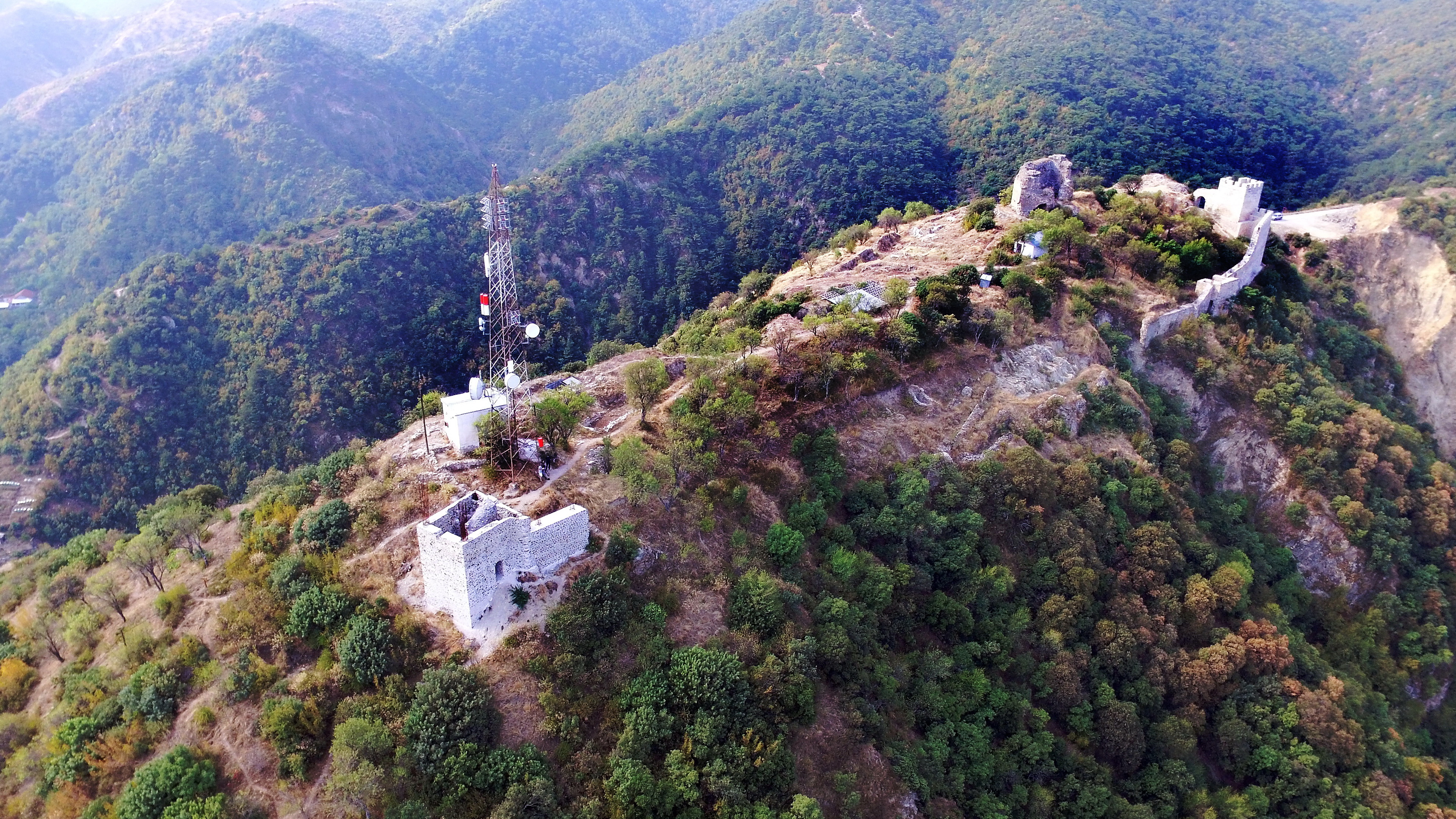
Drone footage of the locality in 2016

The 20th century brought many changes to these areas that will have far-reaching consequences in the further development of the city of Strumica, and also of the fortress above it. Long abandoned and ruined, towards the end of the 19th and the beginning of the 20th century, the fortress above Strumica was already part of the legends and traditions of the local population. The remains of the fortress aroused the curiosity of the generations raised at its foot. At that time, from generation to generation, various stories about its strength, power, and meaning were already passed down. Then, probably, the fortress above Strumica got its popular name "Carevi Kuli" (Tsar's Towers), which will remain until today.

Even Karl May writes about its mystical appeal. In his novel "In the Gorges of the Balkans", from 1888, part of the action also takes place in the city of Strumica. Among other things, he also talks about the fortress above the city, which was shrouded in mystical events during that period.

In the first few decades of the 20th century, Bogdan Filov also passed through these parts, and in his travels, he describes the fortress above Strumica. In his notes from March 16–18, 1913, he describes the Central Defense Tower. Apart from this tower, he also mentions the two towers at the western entrance which he says flanked the main entrance. He designated the name of the fortress there as Carevi Kuli.

Even though the fortress was abandoned a long time ago, certain traces say that life in it did not die out completely. In the whirlwind of the Balkan Wars, World War I, and World War II, the top of the hill was used for military purposes. Archaeological research has shown that in certain places there are findings that point to a short occupation of the fortress, first of all, because of its strategic position.

In the period between the two world wars, Carevi Kuli experienced another collapse caused by the earthquake that hit the area of Valandovo, in March 1931. Namely, during this period, most of the southwest tower was probably demolished, which is visible in several photos taken between the two world wars. It appears that certain remains of this tower were still in good condition until the end of the war. But somewhere near the end of the war, these remains were demolished, so that today only the base is preserved from this tower.

In the interwar period, Carevi Kuli hosted an event that was specific to the city of Strumica. Namely, at the beginning of the great fasts, during the first three days, called "trimeri", the town's population from Strumica used to visit the fortress and distribute leftovers from the trimers' lunch here. This tradition was maintained in Strumica in the post-war period, until the mid-fifties, when it slowly began to disappear.

Interest in the fortress above Strumica will revive again in the first decades of the 21st century when extensive archaeological research and conservation efforts will be carried out, which will slowly restore the old splendor of the medieval fortress.

== See also ==
- List of castles in North Macedonia
