= Qaleh Qazi, East Azerbaijan =

Qaleh Qazi قلعه قاضي
- Village
- Location within Iran
- Coordinates: 37°56′21″N 46°54′00″E
- Country: Iran
- Province: East Azerbaijan
- County: Bostanabad
- Bakhsh: Central
- Rural District: Mehranrud-e Markazi

Population (2006)
  - Total: 474
- Time zone: UTC+3:30 (IRST)
  - Summer (DST): UTC+4:30 (IRDT)

Qaleh Qazi (Persian: قلعه قاضي, also Romanized as Qal‘eh Qāẕī; also known as Qal‘eh-ye Bālā and Qal‘eh) is a village in Mehranrud-e Markazi Rural District, in the Central District of Bostanabad County, East Azerbaijan Province, Iran. At the 2006 census, its population was 474, in 93 families.
