= Qaleh-ye Kumain =

Qaleh-ye Kumain قلعه كومائين
- Village
- Location within Iran
- Coordinates: 34°56′44″N 47°12′42″E
- Country: Iran
- Province: Kurdistan
- County: Kamyaran
- Bakhsh: Muchesh
- Rural District: Sursur

Population (2006)
  - Total: 158
- Time zone: UTC+3:30 (IRST)
  - Summer (DST): UTC+4:30 (IRDT)

Qaleh-ye Kumain (Persian: قلعه كومائين, also Romanized as Qal‘eh-ye Kūmā'īn; also known as Qal‘eh) is a village in Sursur Rural District, Muchesh District, Kamyaran County, Kurdistan Province, Iran. At the 2006 census, its population was 158, in 34 families. The village is populated by Kurds.
