= Kale, West Virginia =

- Unincorporated community
- Location within the state of West Virginia Kale, West Virginia (the United States)
- Coordinates: 37°23′03″N 81°11′07″W
- Country: United States
- State: West Virginia
- County: Mercer
- Elevation: 2,260 ft (690 m)
- Time zone: UTC-5 (Eastern (EST))
  - Summer (DST): UTC-4 (EDT)
- Area codes: 304 & 681
- GNIS feature ID: 1554839

Kale is an unincorporated community in Mercer County, West Virginia, United States. Kale is 4.5 miles (7.2 km) west-northwest of Princeton.

The community most likely derives its name from the local Kale (or Kail) family.
