= Qaleh, Avaj =

Qaleh قلعه
- Village
- Location within Iran
- Coordinates: 35°48′27″N 48°51′52″E
- Country: Iran
- Province: Qazvin
- County: Avaj
- Bakhsh: Central District
- Rural District: Hesar-e Valiyeasr

Population (2006)
  - Total: 149
- Time zone: UTC+3:30 (IRST)

Qaleh (Persian: قلعه, also Romanized as Qal‘eh; also known as Qal‘eh-ye Dīdār) is a village in Hesar-e Valiyeasr Rural District, Central District, Avaj County, Qazvin Province, Iran. At the 2006 census, its population was 149, in 42 families.
