= Qaleh, Gilan =

Qaleh قلعه
- Village
- Location within Iran
- Coordinates: 38°26′42″N 48°49′09″E
- Country: Iran
- Province: Gilan
- County: Astara
- Bakhsh: Central
- Rural District: Virmuni

Population (2006)
  - Total: 366
- Time zone: UTC+3:30 (IRST)
  - Summer (DST): UTC+4:30 (IRDT)

Qaleh (Persian: قلعه, also Romanized as Qal‘eh) is a village in Virmuni Rural District, in the Central District of Astara County, Gilan Province, Iran. At the 2006 census, its population was 366, in 83 families.

== Language ==
Linguistic composition of the village.

Qaleh linguistic composition
language	percent
Talysh	70%
Azerbaijani	30%
