= HMS Kale =

Two ships of the Royal Navy have borne the name HMS Kale:

- HMS Kale (1904) was a River-class destroyer launched in 1904 and sunk by a mine in 1918.
- HMS Kale (K241) was a River-class frigate launched in 1942 and sold in 1956.
