= Kale, Nepal =

Coordinates: 29°35′N 80°41′E

Kale कले
- Village development committee
- Interactive map of Kale
- Country: Nepal
- Zone: Karnali Zone
- District: Mugu District

Population (1991)
  - Total: 879
- Time zone: UTC+5:45 (Nepal Time)

Kale is a village development committee in Mugu District in the Karnali Zone of north-western Nepal. At the time of the 1991 Nepal census it had a population of 876 people living in 186 individual households.
