= Qaleh, Babol =

Qaleh قلعه
- Village
- Location within Iran
- Coordinates: 36°18′22″N 52°39′14″E
- Country: Iran
- Province: Mazandaran
- County: Babol
- Bakhsh: Bandpey-ye Sharqi
- Rural District: Sajjadrud

Population (2006)
  - Total: 339
- Time zone: UTC+3:30 (IRST)
  - Summer (DST): UTC+4:30 (IRDT)

Qaleh (Persian: قلعه, also Romanized as Qal’eh) is a village in Sajjadrud Rural District, Bandpey-ye Sharqi District, Babol County, Mazandaran Province, Iran. At the 2006 census, its population was 339, in 92 families.
