= Qaleh, Qazvin =

Qaleh قلعه
- Village
- Location within Iran
- Coordinates: 36°29′21″N 49°34′18″E
- Country: Iran
- Province: Qazvin
- County: Qazvin
- Bakhsh: Tarom Sofla
- Rural District: Kuhgir

Population (2006)
  - Total: 63
- Time zone: UTC+3:30 (IRST)
  - Summer (DST): UTC+4:30 (IRDT)

Qaleh (Persian: قلعه also Romanized as Qal‘eh and Qala) is a village in Kuhgir Rural District, Tarom Sofla District, Qazvin County, Qazvin Province, Iran. At the 2006 census, its population was 63, in 15 families. This village is populated by
