= Krupište =

Krupište Крупиште
- Village
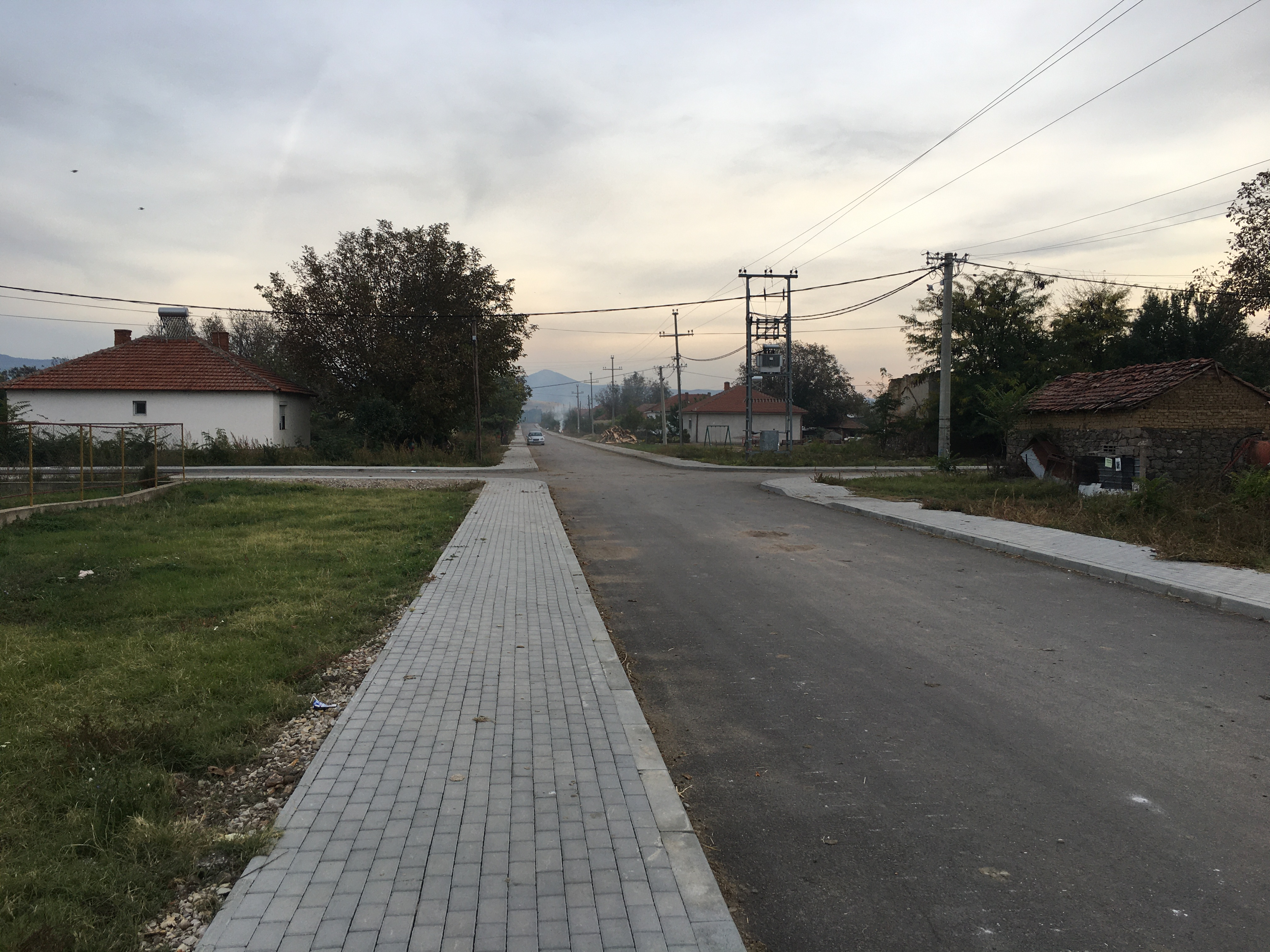
- Street in the village

- Location within North Macedonia
- Country: North Macedonia
- Region: Eastern
- Municipality: Karbinci

Population (2002)
  - Total: 336
- Time zone: UTC+1 (CET)
  - Summer (DST): UTC+2 (CEST)
- Website: .

Krupište (Macedonian: Крупиште) is a village in the municipality of Karbinci, North Macedonia.

== Demographics ==
According to the 2002 census, the village had a total of 336 inhabitants. Ethnic groups in the village include:

- Macedonians 313
- Turks 12
- Aromanians 10
- Others 1

As of 2021, the village of Krupishte has 274 inhabitants and the ethnic composition was the following:

- Macedonians – 222
- Romani – 6
- Person without Data - 46
