= Ebeplija =

Ebeplija Ебеплија
- Village
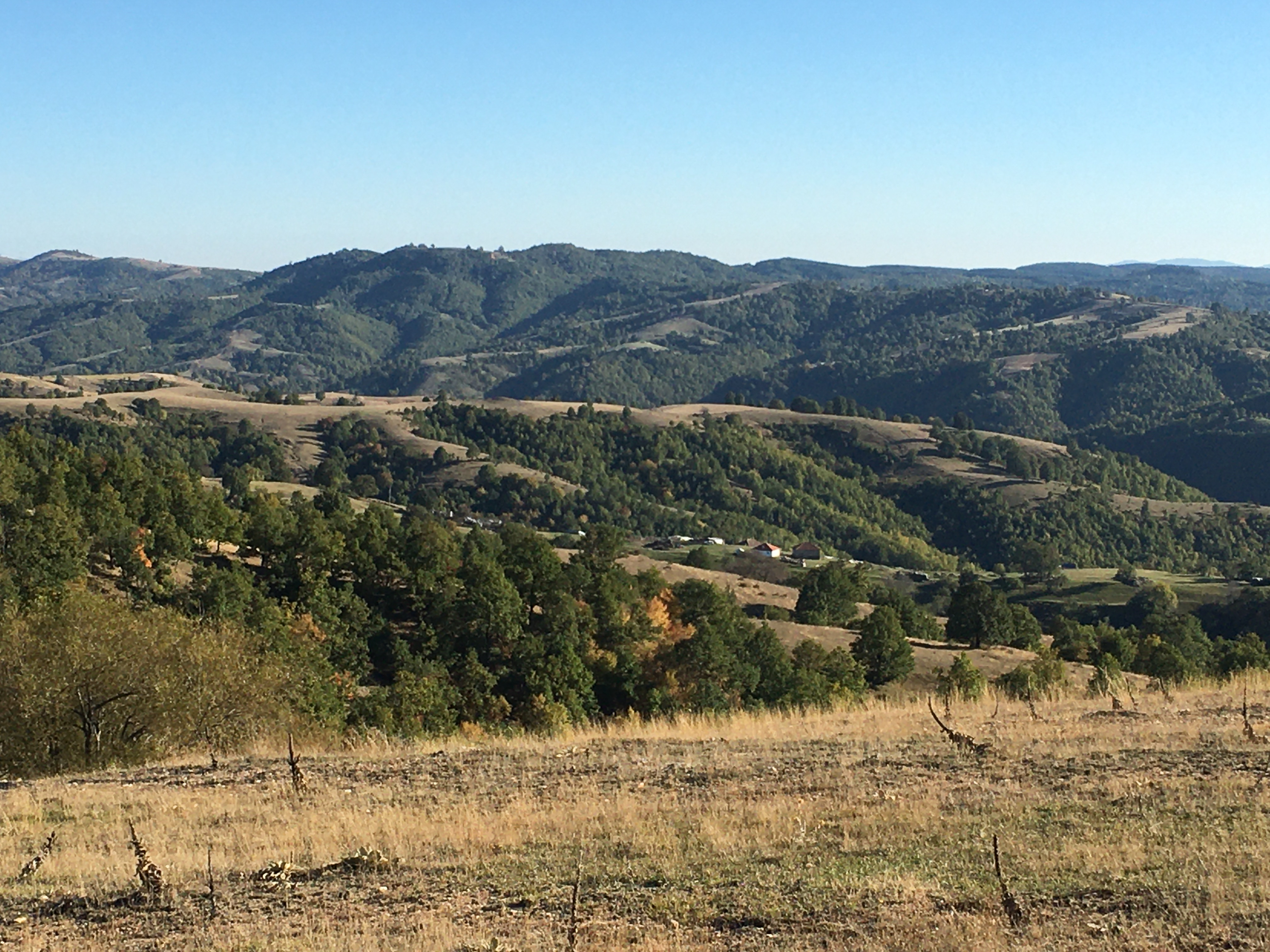
- View of the village

- Location within North Macedonia
- Country: North Macedonia
- Region: Eastern
- Municipality: Karbinci

Population (2002)
  - Total: 11
- Time zone: UTC+1 (CET)
  - Summer (DST): UTC+2 (CEST)
- Website: .

Ebeplija (Macedonian: Ебеплија) is a village in the municipality of Karbinci, North Macedonia.

== Demographics ==
According to the 2002 census, the village had a total of 11 inhabitants. Ethnic groups in the village include:

- Turks 11

As of 2021, the village of Ebeplija has 13 inhabitants and the ethnic composition was the following:

- Turks – 9
- Person without Data - 4
