= Kozjak =

Kozjak is a common South Slavic toponym derived from koza ("goat") that may refer to:

== Austria ==
- Kozjak, the Slovene name for Kosiak or Geißberg, a mountain in the Karawanks in southern Austria

== Bosnia and Herzegovina ==
- Kozjak, Lopare, a village near Lopare, Bosnia and Herzegovina

== Bulgaria ==
- Kozjak or Kozyak, a medieval name of Obzor
- Kozyak, Bulgaria, a village in Silistra Province

== Croatia ==
- Kozjak Island, an uninhabited islet near Lošinj, Croatia
- Mali Kozjak, a mountain on the Croatian Adriatic coast
- Veliki Kozjak, a mountain in the Croatian Dalmatian Zagora
- Kozjak, Bilje, a settlement in Croatian Baranja
- Kozjak Lake, the largest of the Plitvice Lakes
- Kozjak, Maksimir, a neighbourhood in Zagreb

== North Macedonia ==
- Kozjak (Prilep), a mountain in North Macedonia
- Kozjak Hydro Power Plant, with an eponymous artificial lake in North Macedonia
- Kozjak, Resen, a village in Resen Municipality, North Macedonia
- Kozjak, Karbinci, a village in the Municipality of Karbinci, North Macedonia
- Kozjak (mountain near Pčinja), a mountain in North Macedonia and Serbia
- Kozjak (region) (Kozjačija), a region in North Macedonia and Serbia

== Serbia ==
- Kozjak (mountain near Pčinja), a mountain in Serbia and North Macedonia
- Kozjak (region) (Kozjačija), a region in Serbia and North Macedonia
- Kozjak (Loznica), a village near Loznica, Serbia
- Novi Kozjak, a village near Alibunar, Serbia

== Slovenia ==
- Kozjak Castle, a castle ruin near Trebnje, Slovenia
- Kozjak Mountains, north of the Drava Valley in northeastern Slovenia and southeastern Austria
- Kozjak subdialect
- Kozjak Pass, a mountain pass in the Kamnik–Savinja Alps in northern Slovenia

=== Settlements ===
- Kozjak, Mislinja, a village near Mislinja, Slovenia
- Kozjak nad Pesnico, a village in the Municipality of Kungota, northeastern Slovenia
- Kozjak pri Ceršaku, a village in the Municipality of Šentilj, northeastern Slovenia
- Paški Kozjak, a village in the Municipality of Velenje, northeastern Slovenia
- Kozjak, a hamlet of Zabukovje in the Municipality of Šentrupert, southeastern Slovenia
