= Radanje =

Radanje Радање
- Village
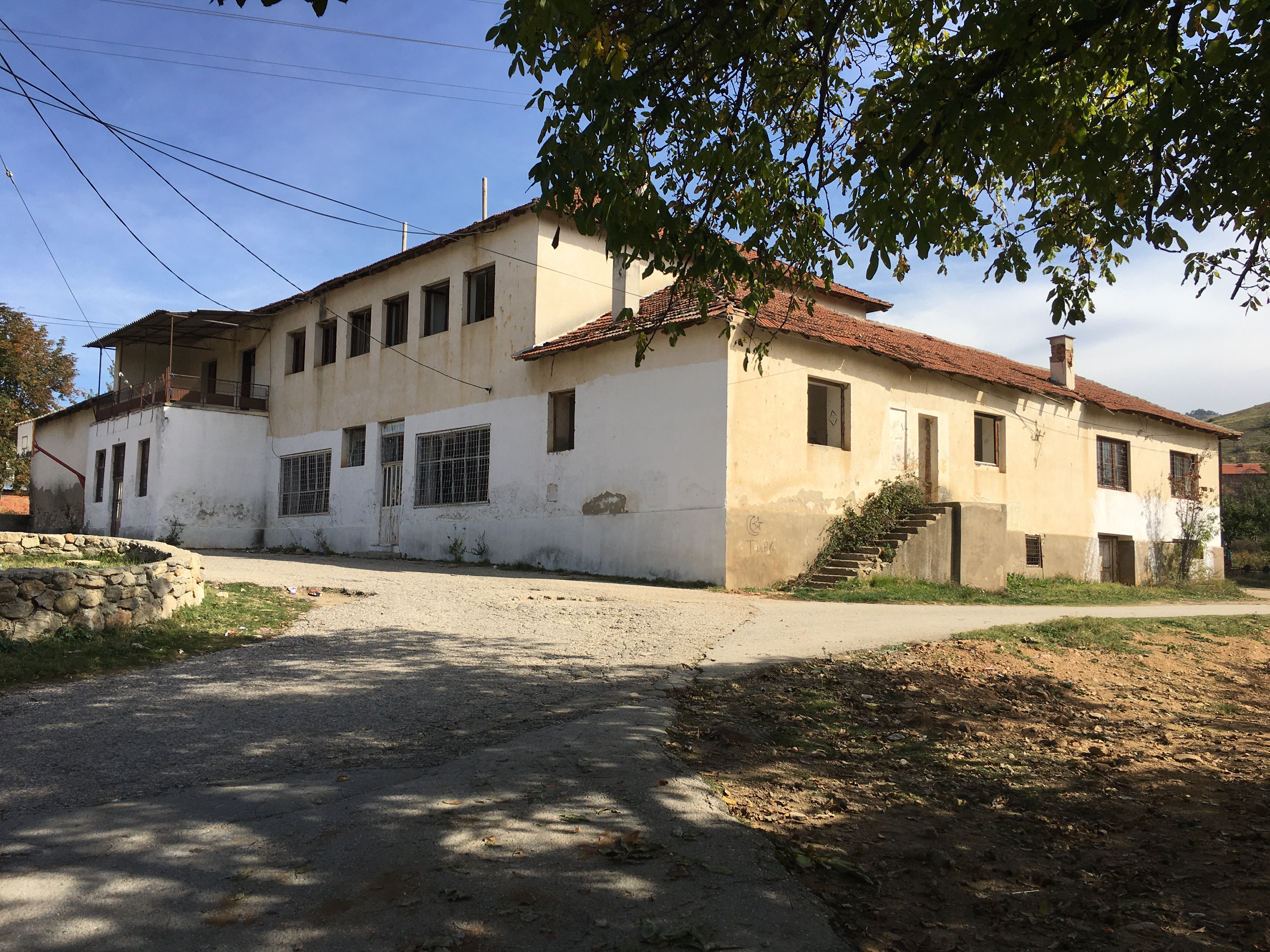
- Former cultural center in the village

- Location within North Macedonia
- Country: North Macedonia
- Region: Eastern
- Municipality: Karbinci

Population (2002)
  - Total: 471
- Time zone: UTC+1 (CET)
  - Summer (DST): UTC+2 (CEST)
- Website: .

Radanje (Macedonian: Радање) is a village in the municipality of Karbinci, North Macedonia.

== Demographics ==
According to the 2002 census, the village had a total of 471 inhabitants. Ethnic groups in the village include:

- Macedonians 318
- Serbs 1
- Turks 118
- Aromanians 34

As of 2021, the village of Radanje has 558 inhabitants and the ethnic composition was the following:

- Turks - 361
- Macedonians – 110
- Aromanians – 10
- Romani – 1
- others – 2
- Person without Data - 74
