= Argulica =

Argulica Аргулица
- Village
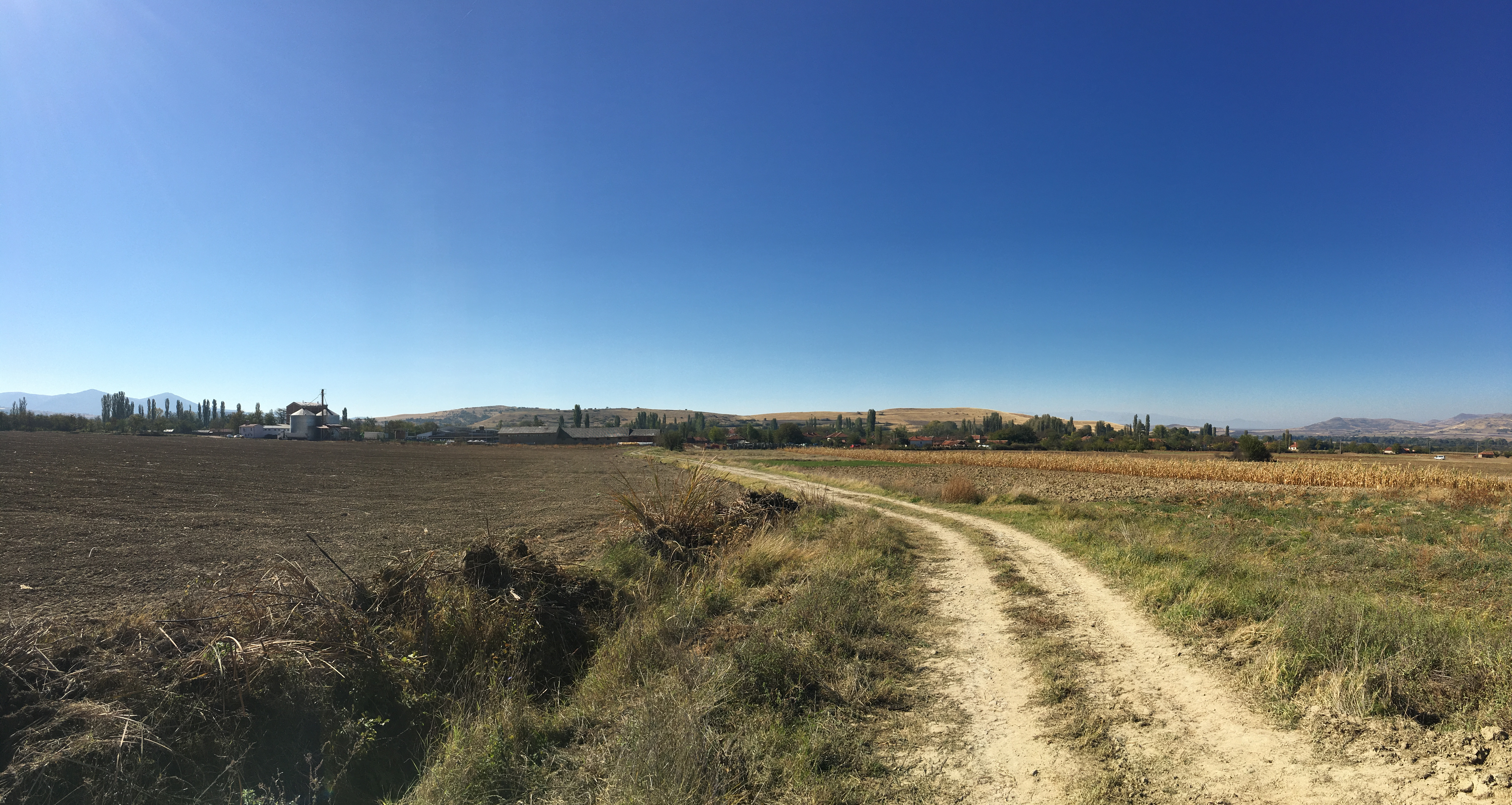
- View of the village

- Location within North Macedonia
- Country: North Macedonia
- Region: Eastern
- Municipality: Karbinci

Population (2021)
  - Total: 178
- Time zone: UTC+1 (CET)
  - Summer (DST): UTC+2 (CEST)
- Website: .

Argulica (Macedonian: Аргулица) is a village in the municipality of Karbinci, North Macedonia.

== Demographics ==
According to the 2002 census, the village had a total of 315 inhabitants.

As of 2021, the village of Argulica has 178 inhabitants and the ethnic composition was the following:

- Macedonians – 97
- Turks – 8
- Person without Data - 73

== Gallery ==
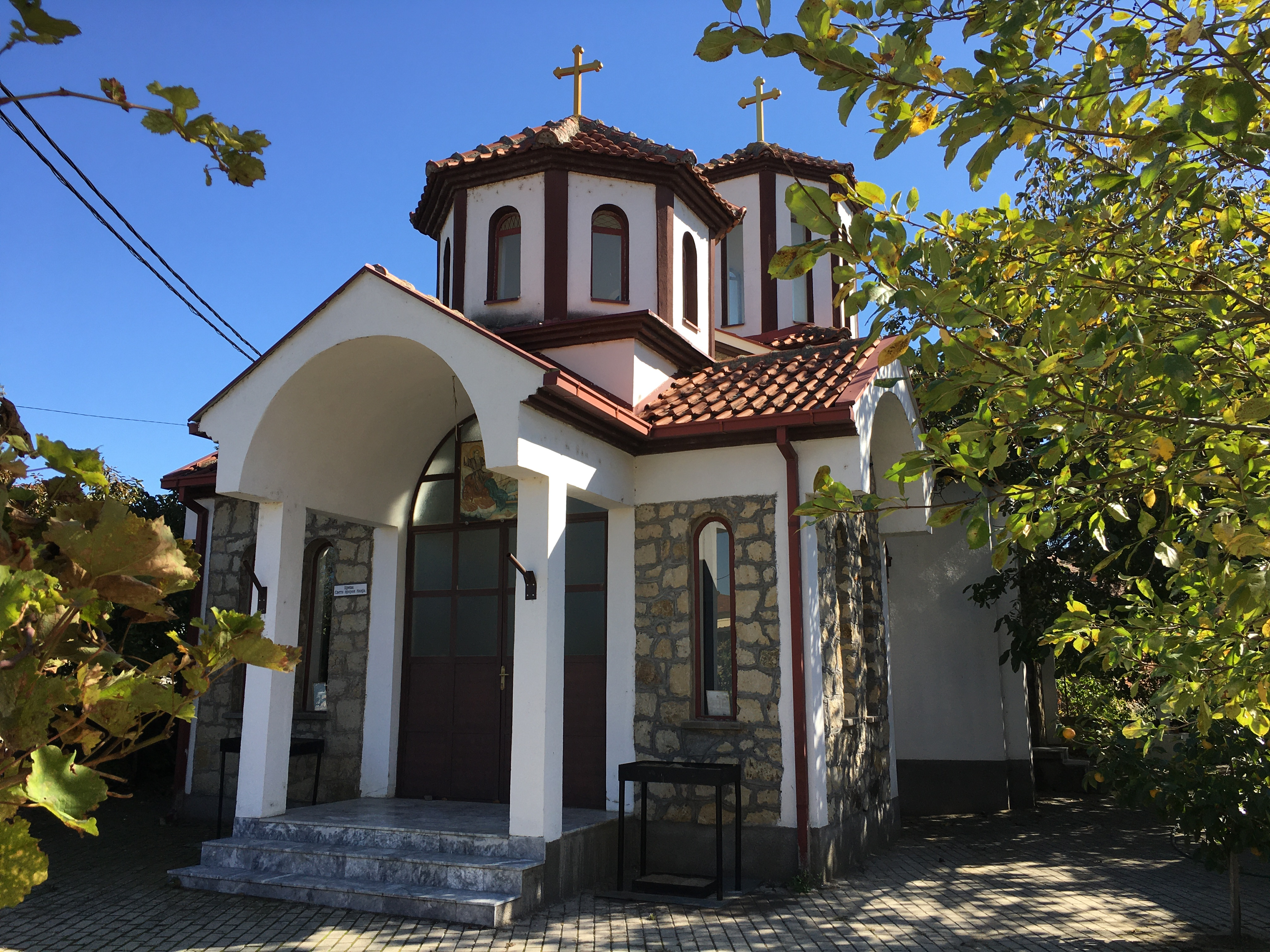
St. Elijah's Church

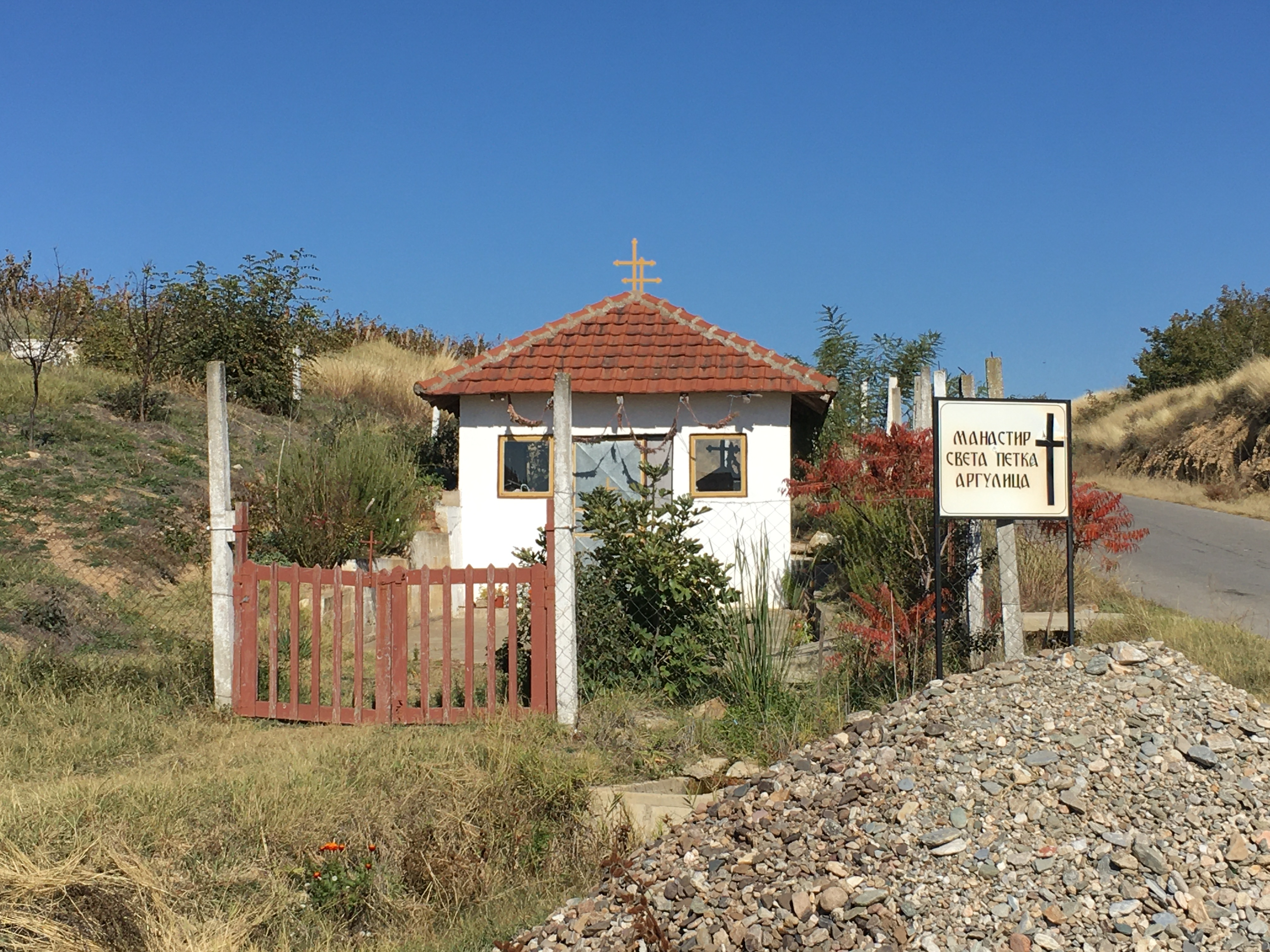
Church of St. Petka

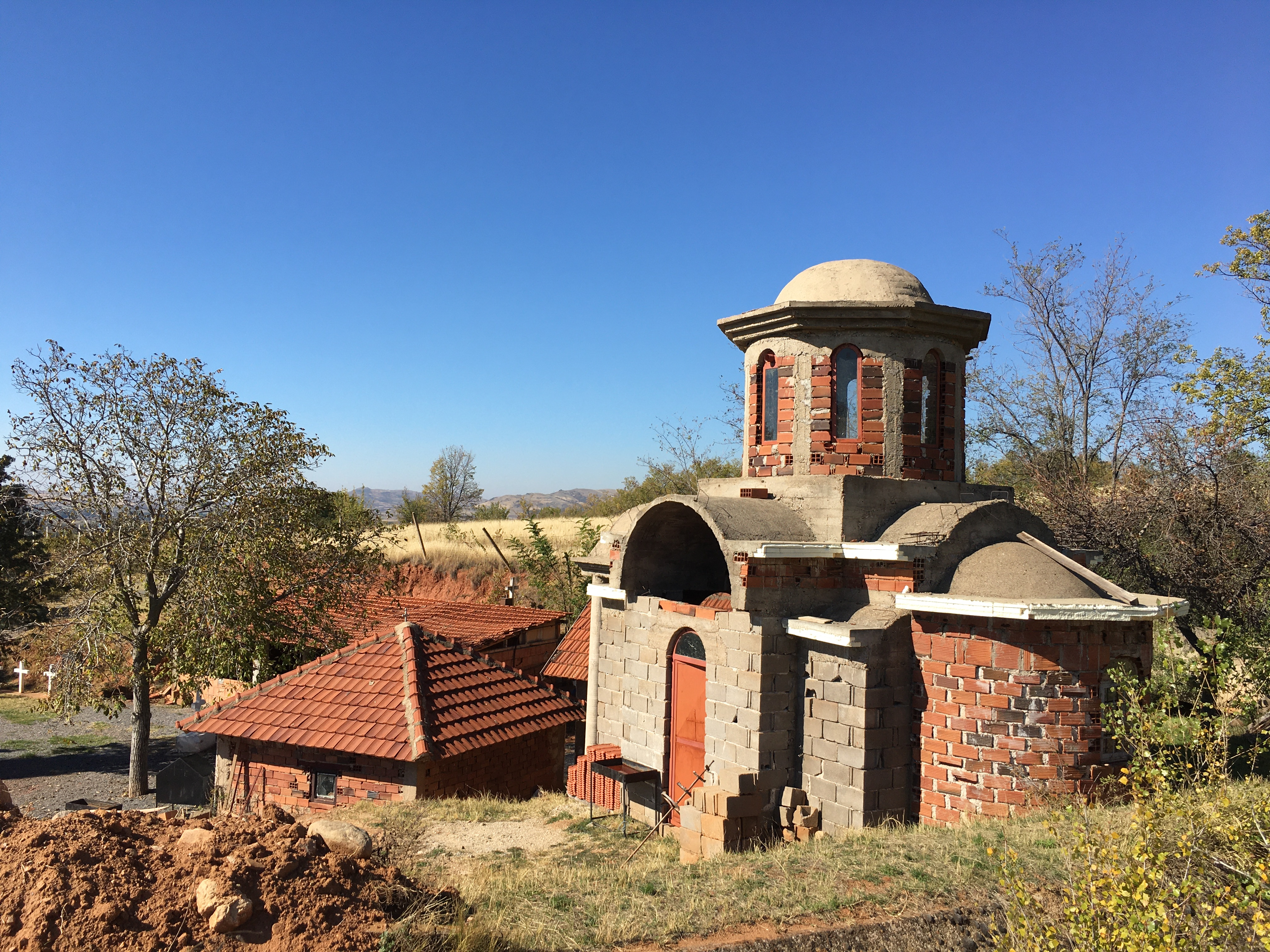
Church of the Nativity of the Theotokos
- Macedonians 303
- Turks 8
- Aromanians 2
- Others 2
