= Kepekçelija =

Kepekçelija Кепекчелија
- Village
- Location within North Macedonia
- Country: North Macedonia
- Region: Eastern
- Municipality: Karbinci

Population (2002)
  - Total: 9
- Time zone: UTC+1 (CET)
  - Summer (DST): UTC+2 (CEST)
- Website: .

Kepekçelija (Macedonian: Кепекчелија) is a village in the municipality of Karbinci, North Macedonia.

== Demographics ==
According to the 2002 census, the village had a total of 9 inhabitants. Ethnic groups in the village include:

- Turks 9
