= Golem Gaber =

Golem Gaber Голем Габер
- Village
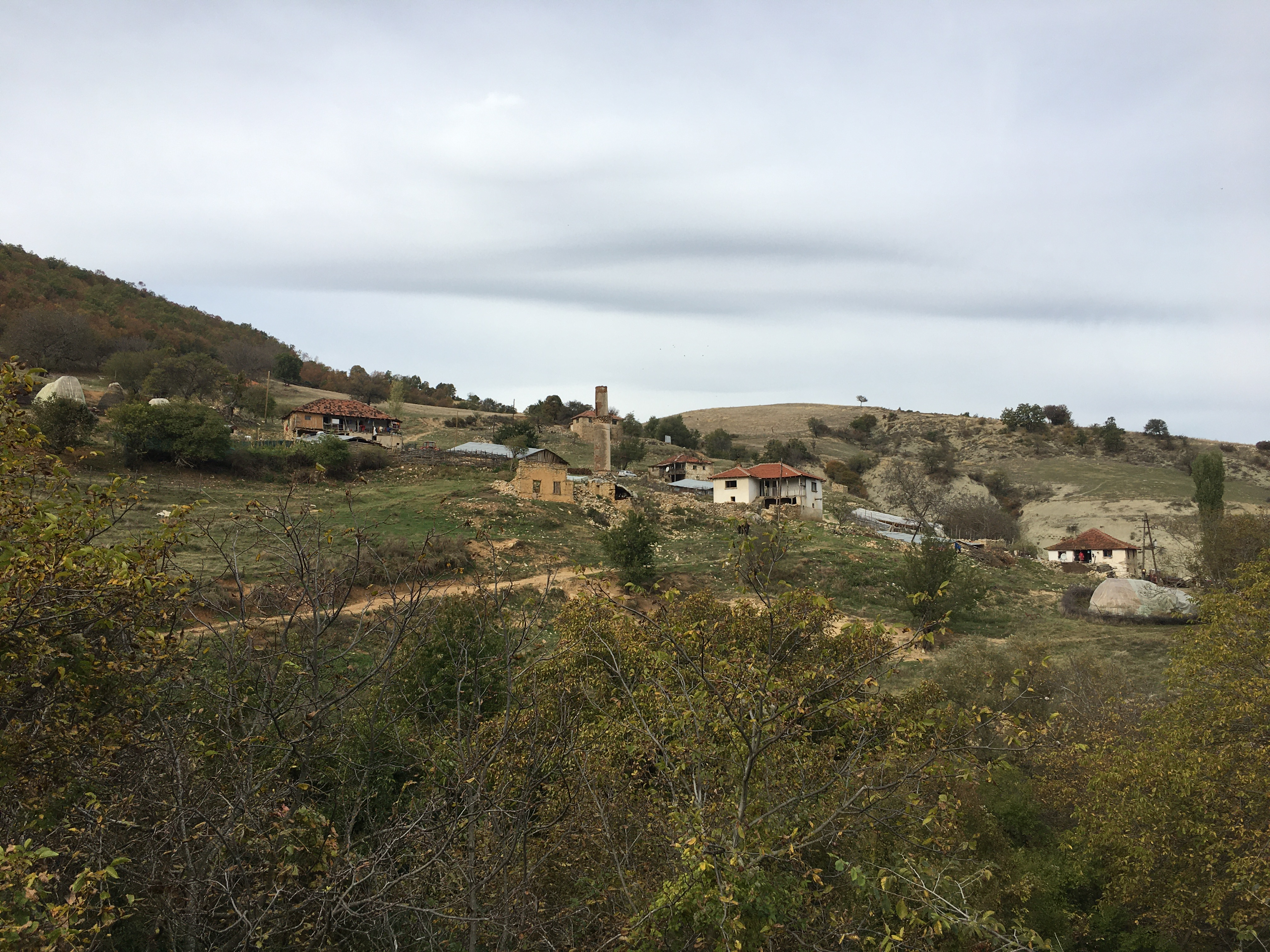
- View of the village

- Location within North Macedonia
- Country: North Macedonia
- Region: Eastern
- Municipality: Karbinci

Population (2021)
  - Total: 20
- Time zone: UTC+1 (CET)
  - Summer (DST): UTC+2 (CEST)
- Website: .

Golem Gaber (Macedonian: Голем Габер) is a village in the municipality of Karbinci, North Macedonia.

== Demographics ==
As of the 2021 census, Golem Gaber had 20 residents with the following ethnic composition:

- Turks 17
- Persons for whom data are taken from administrative sources 3

According to the 2002 census, the village had a total of 32 inhabitants. Ethnic groups in the village include:

- Turks 32
