= Junuzlija =

Junuzlija Јунузлија
- Village
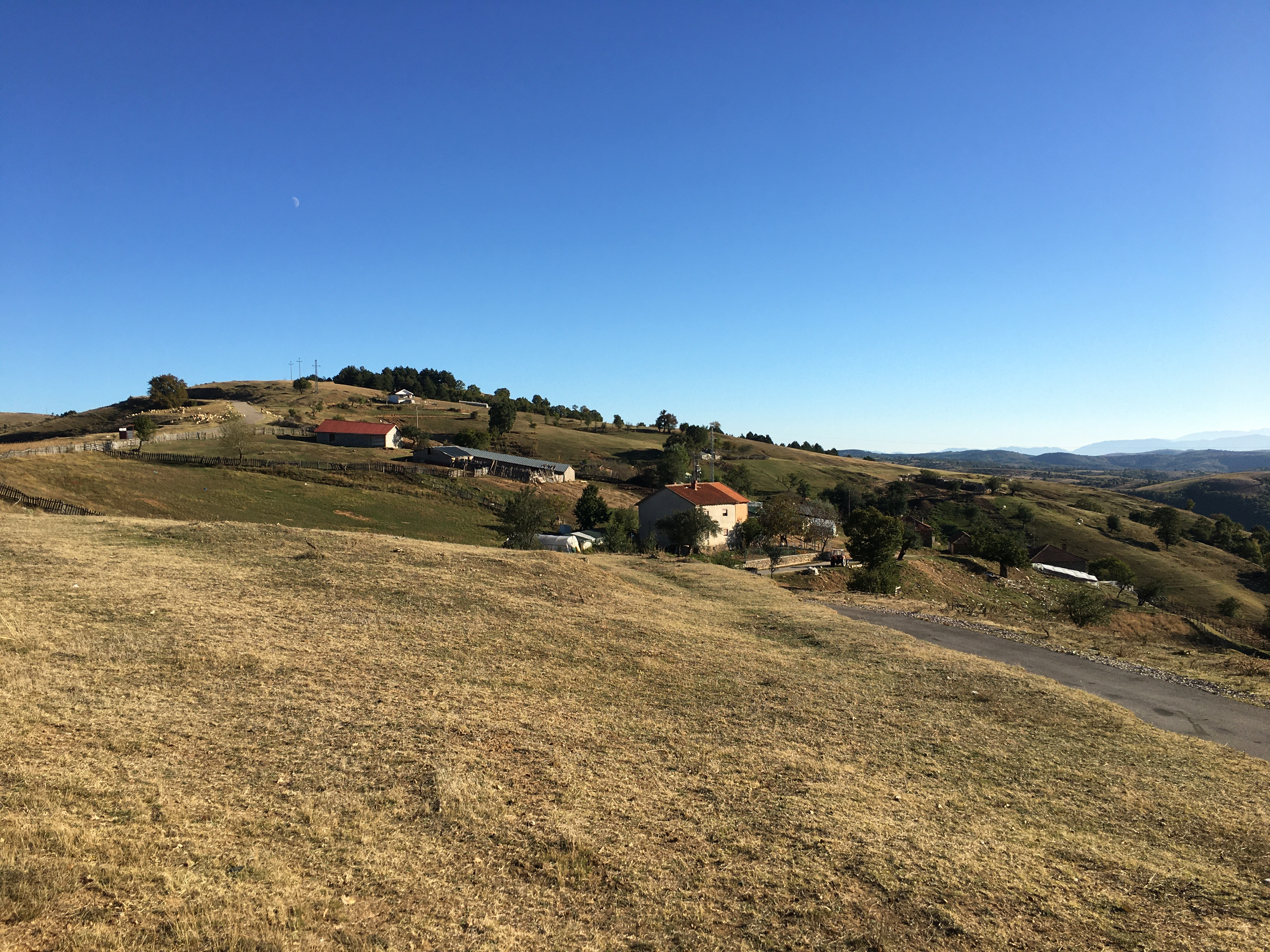
- View of the village

- Location within North Macedonia
- Country: North Macedonia
- Region: Eastern
- Municipality: Karbinci

Population (2002)
  - Total: 35
- Time zone: UTC+1 (CET)
  - Summer (DST): UTC+2 (CEST)
- Website: .

Junuzlija (Macedonian: Јунузлија) is a village in the municipality of Karbinci, North Macedonia.

== Demographics ==
According to the 2002 census, the village had a total of 35 inhabitants. Ethnic groups in the village include:

- Turks 35

As of 2021, the village of Junuzlija has 39 inhabitants and the ethnic composition was the following:

- Turks – 23
- Person without Data - 16
