= Prnalija, Karbinci =

Prnalija Прналија
- Village
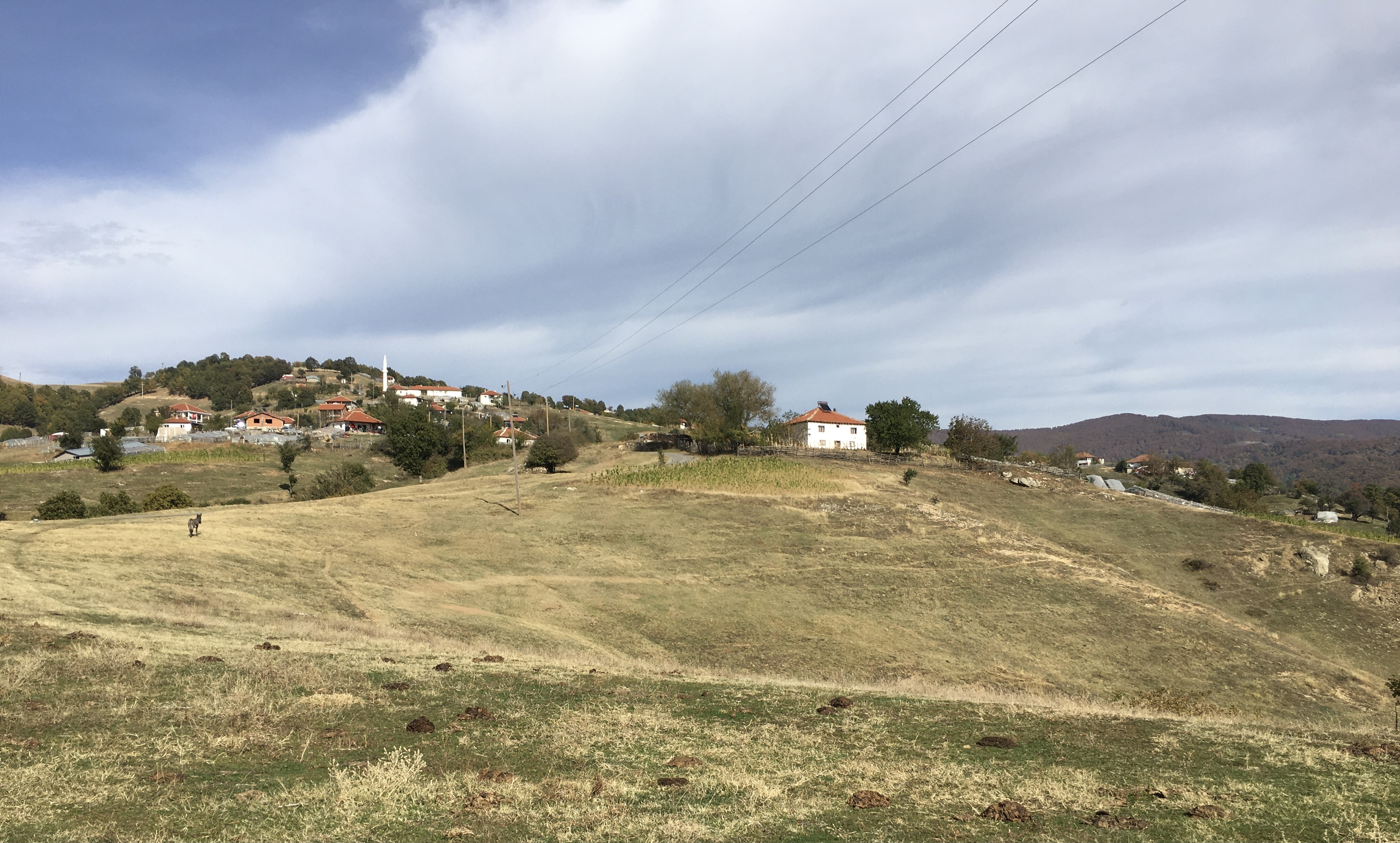
- View of the village

- Location within North Macedonia
- Country: North Macedonia
- Region: Eastern
- Municipality: Karbinci

Population (2021)
  - Total: 161
- Time zone: UTC+1 (CET)
  - Summer (DST): UTC+2 (CEST)
- Website: .

Prnalija (Macedonian: Прналија) is a village in the municipality of Karbinci, North Macedonia.

== Demographics ==
As of the 2021 census, Prnalija had 161 residents with the following ethnic composition:

- Turks 149
- Persons for whom data are taken from administrative sources 12

According to the 2002 census, the village had a total of 197 inhabitants. Ethnic groups in the village include:

- Turks 197
