= Crvulevo =

Crvulevo Црвулево
- Village
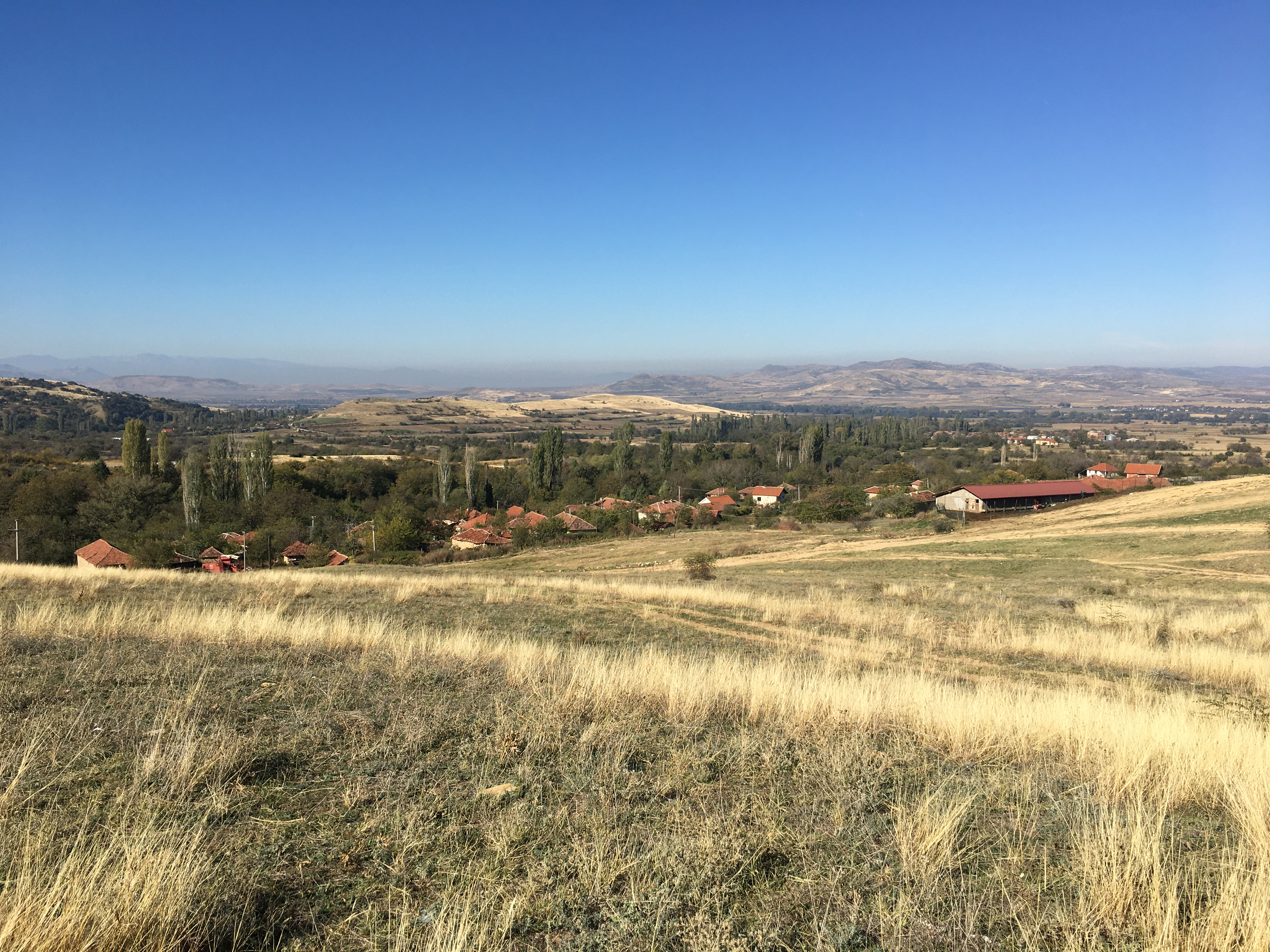
- View of the village

- Location within North Macedonia
- Country: North Macedonia
- Region: Eastern
- Municipality: Karbinci

Population (2021)
  - Total: 18
- Time zone: UTC+1 (CET)
  - Summer (DST): UTC+2 (CEST)
- Website: .

Crvulevo (Macedonian: Црвулево) is a village in the municipality of Karbinci, North Macedonia.

== Demographics ==
According to the 2002 census, the village had a total of 51 inhabitants. Ethnic groups in the village include:

- Macedonians 42
- Serbs 1
- Aromanians 8

As of 2021, the village of Crvulevo has 18 inhabitants and the ethnic composition was the following:

- Macedonians – 16
- Person without Data - 2
