= Kalauzlija, Karbinci =

Kalauzlija Калаузлија
- Village
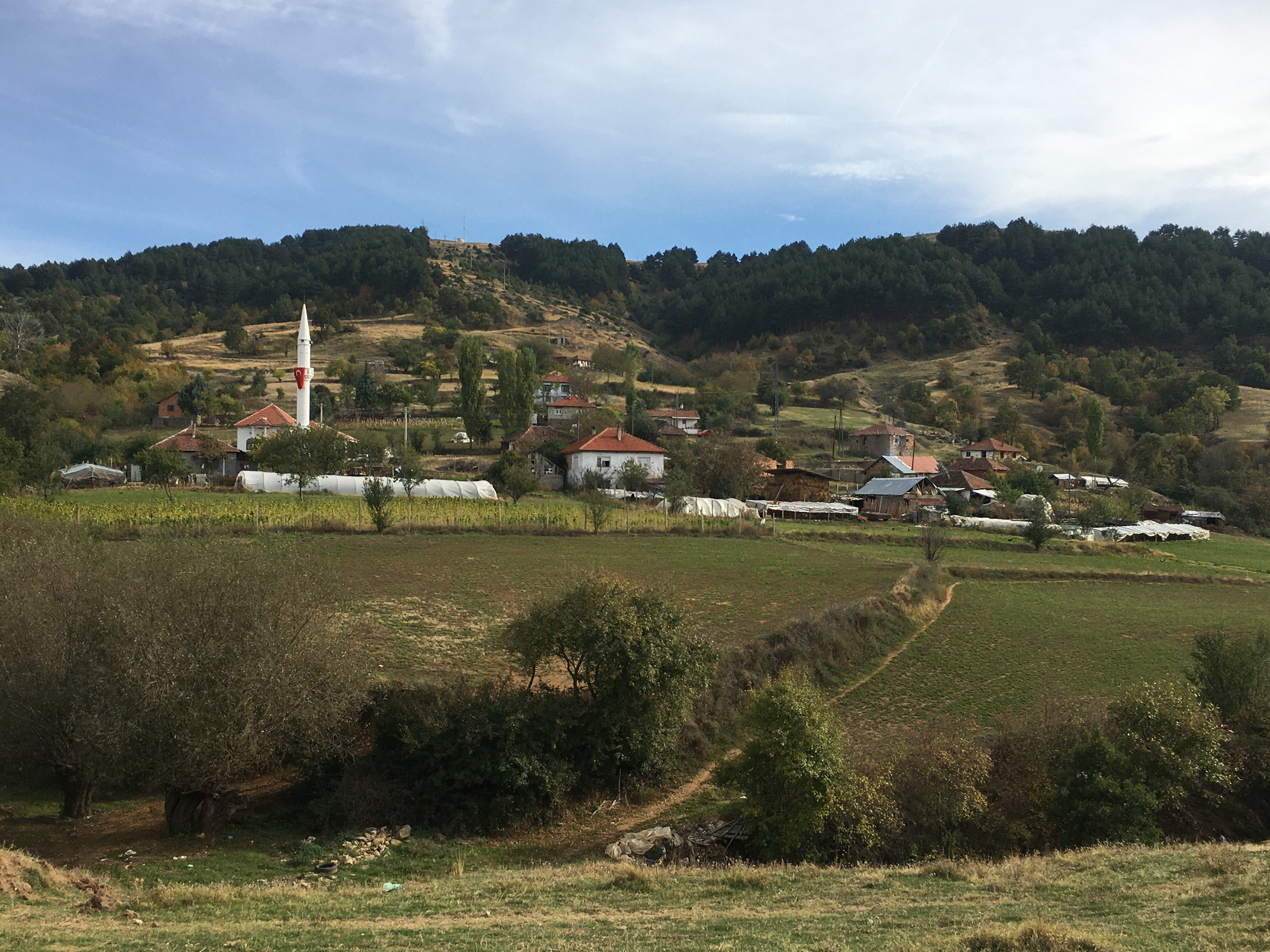
- View of the village

- Location within North Macedonia
- Country: North Macedonia
- Region: Eastern
- Municipality: Karbinci

Population (2002)
  - Total: 61
- Time zone: UTC+1 (CET)
  - Summer (DST): UTC+2 (CEST)
- Website: .

Kalauzlija (Macedonian: Калаузлија) is a village in the municipality of Karbinci, North Macedonia.

== Demographics ==
According to the 2002 census, the village had a total of 61 inhabitants. Ethnic groups in the village include:

- Macedonians 13
- Turks 48

As of 2021, the village of Kalauzlija has 51 inhabitants and the ethnic composition was the following:

- Turks - 41
- Macedonians – 7
- Serbs – 1
- Person without Data - 2
