= Nov Karaorman =

Nov Karaorman Нов Караорман
- Village
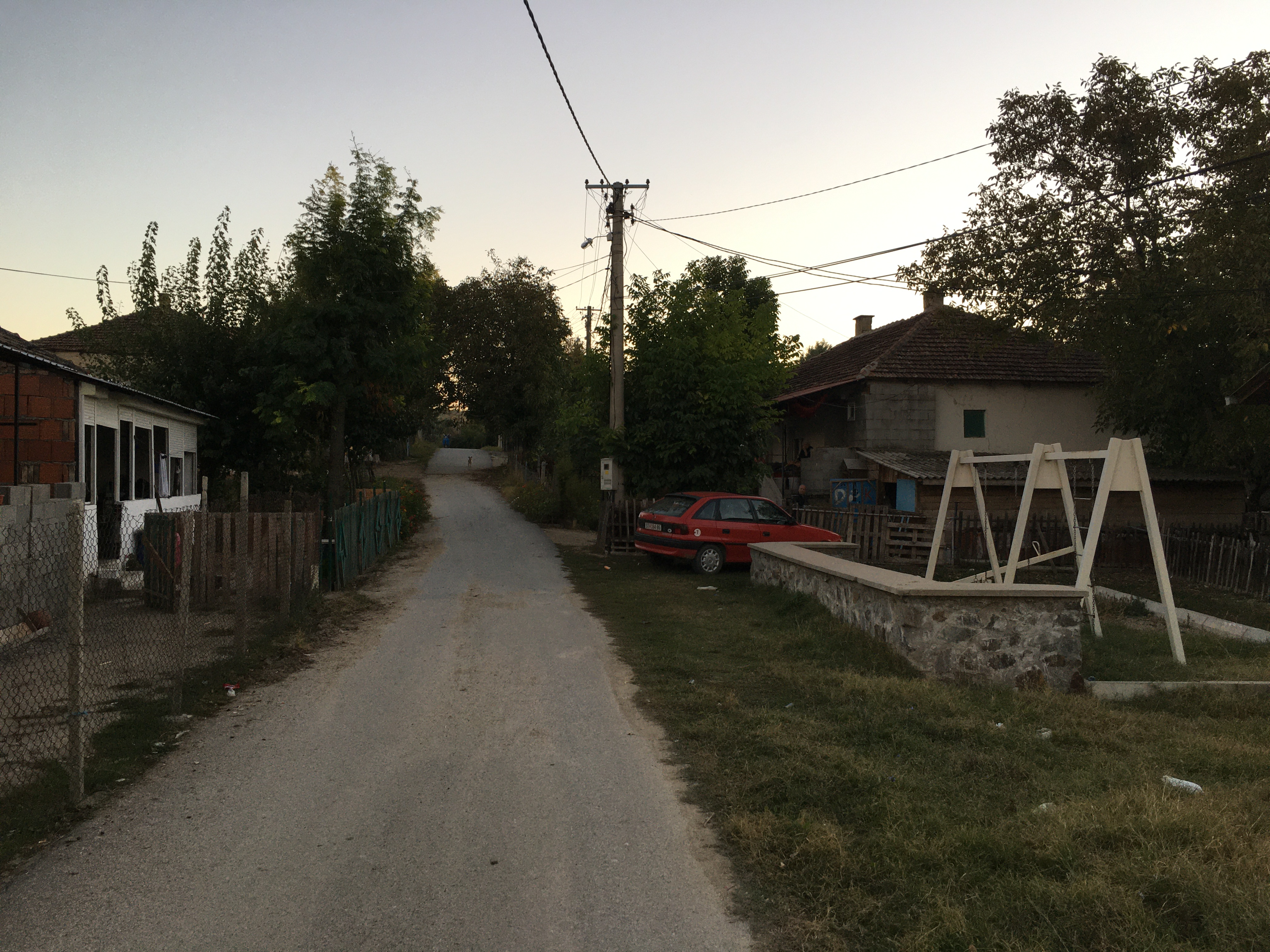
- Street in the village

- Location within North Macedonia
- Country: North Macedonia
- Region: Eastern
- Municipality: Karbinci

Population (2021)
  - Total: 64
- Time zone: UTC+1 (CET)
  - Summer (DST): UTC+2 (CEST)
- Website: .

Nov Karaorman (Macedonian: Нов Караорман) is a village in the municipality of Karbinci, North Macedonia.

== Demographics ==
As of the 2021 census, Nov Karaorman had 64 residents with the following ethnic composition:

- Macedonians 41
- Persons for whom data are taken from administrative sources 23

According to the 2002 census, the village had a total of 67 inhabitants. Ethnic groups in the village include:

- Macedonians 64
- Serbs 1
- Romani 2
