= Prnalija =

Prnalija may refer to:

- Prnalija, Karbinci, North Macedonia
- Prnalija, Radoviš, North Macedonia
