= Tarinci =

Tarinci Таринци
- Village
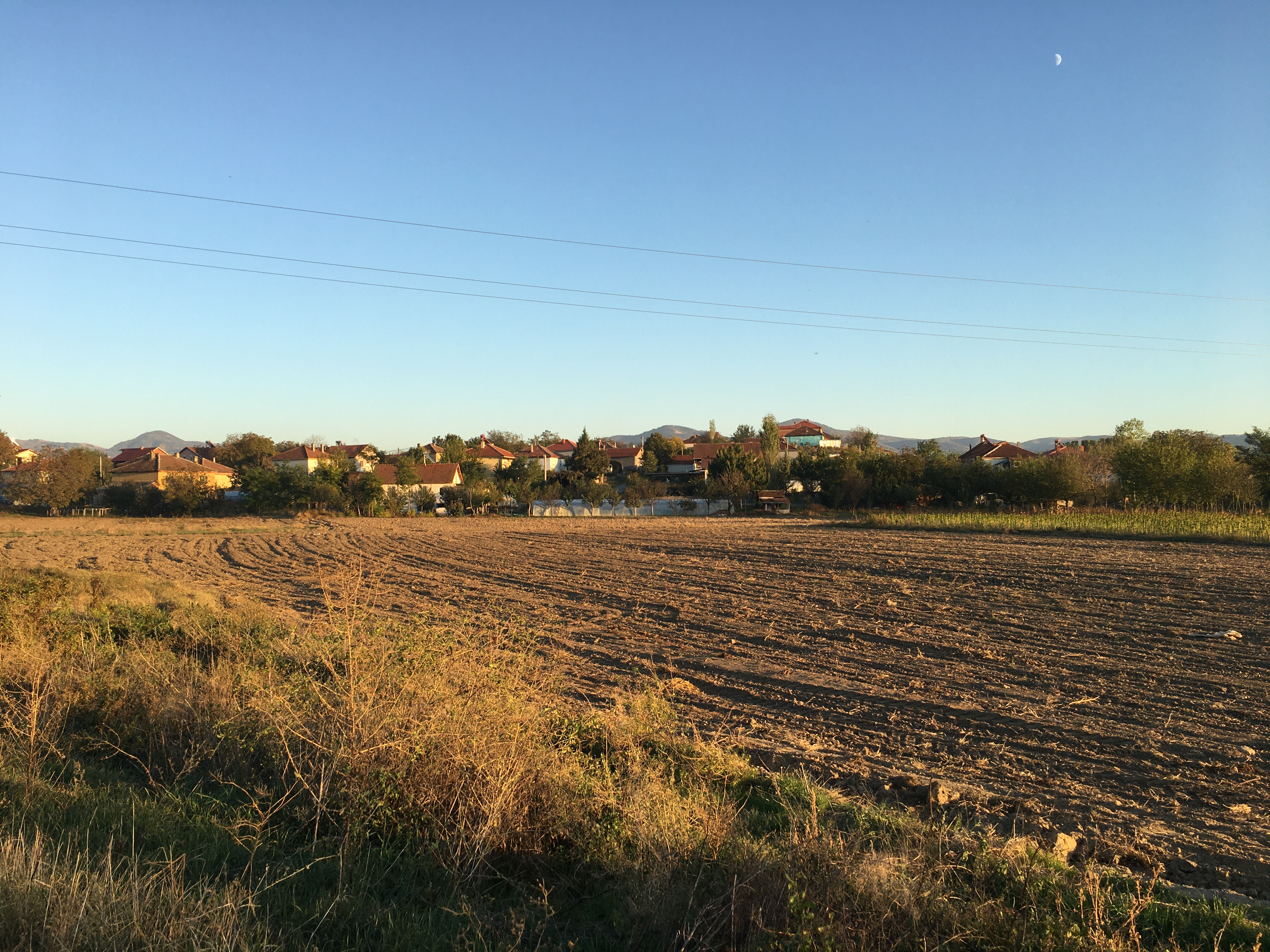
- View of the village Tarinci

- Location within North Macedonia
- Country: North Macedonia
- Region: Eastern
- Municipality: Karbinci

Population (2002)
  - Total: 905
- Time zone: UTC+1 (CET)
  - Summer (DST): UTC+2 (CEST)
- Website: .

Tarinci (Macedonian: Таринци) is a village in the municipality of Karbinci, North Macedonia.

== Demographics ==
According to the 2002 census, the village had a total of 905 inhabitants. Ethnic groups in the village include:

- Macedonians 902
- Serbs 3

As of 2021, the village of Tarinci has 7423 inhabitants and the ethnic composition was the following:

- Macedonians – 701
- Romani – 7
- Serbs – 6
- Person without Data – 28

== Gallery ==
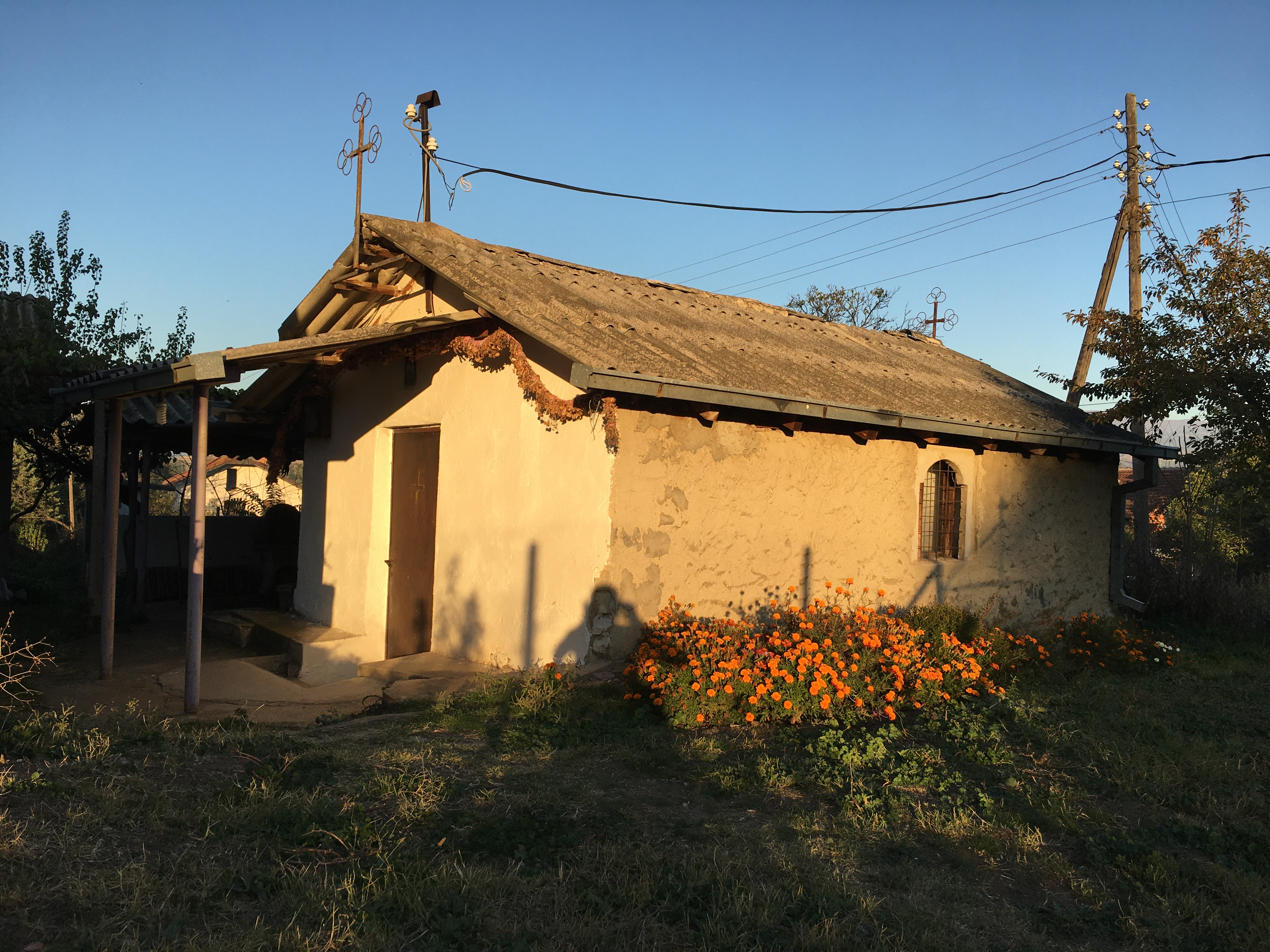
St. Demetrius' Church

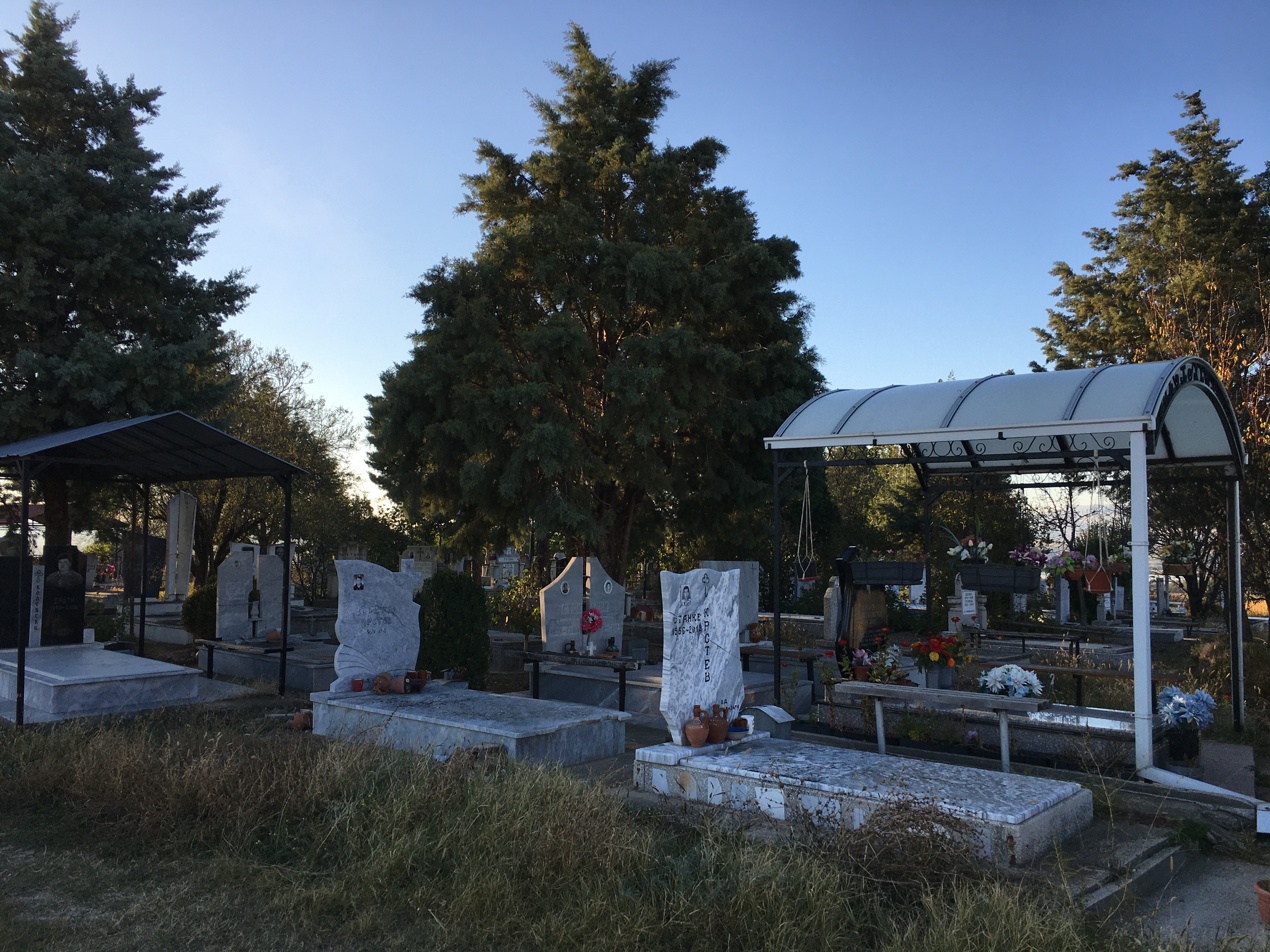
Village cemetery

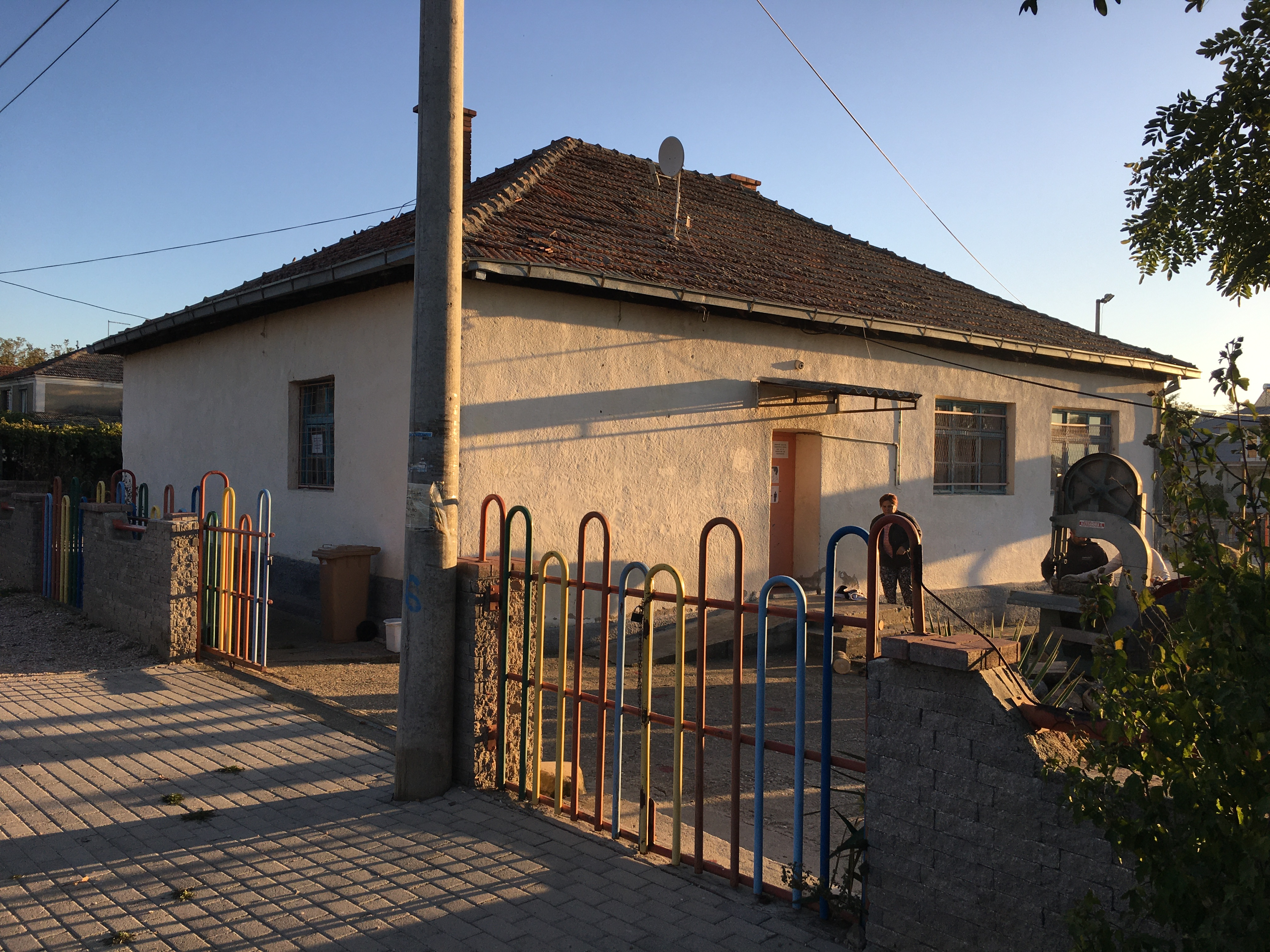
Primary School
