= Dolni Balvan =

Dolni Balvan Долни Балван
- Village
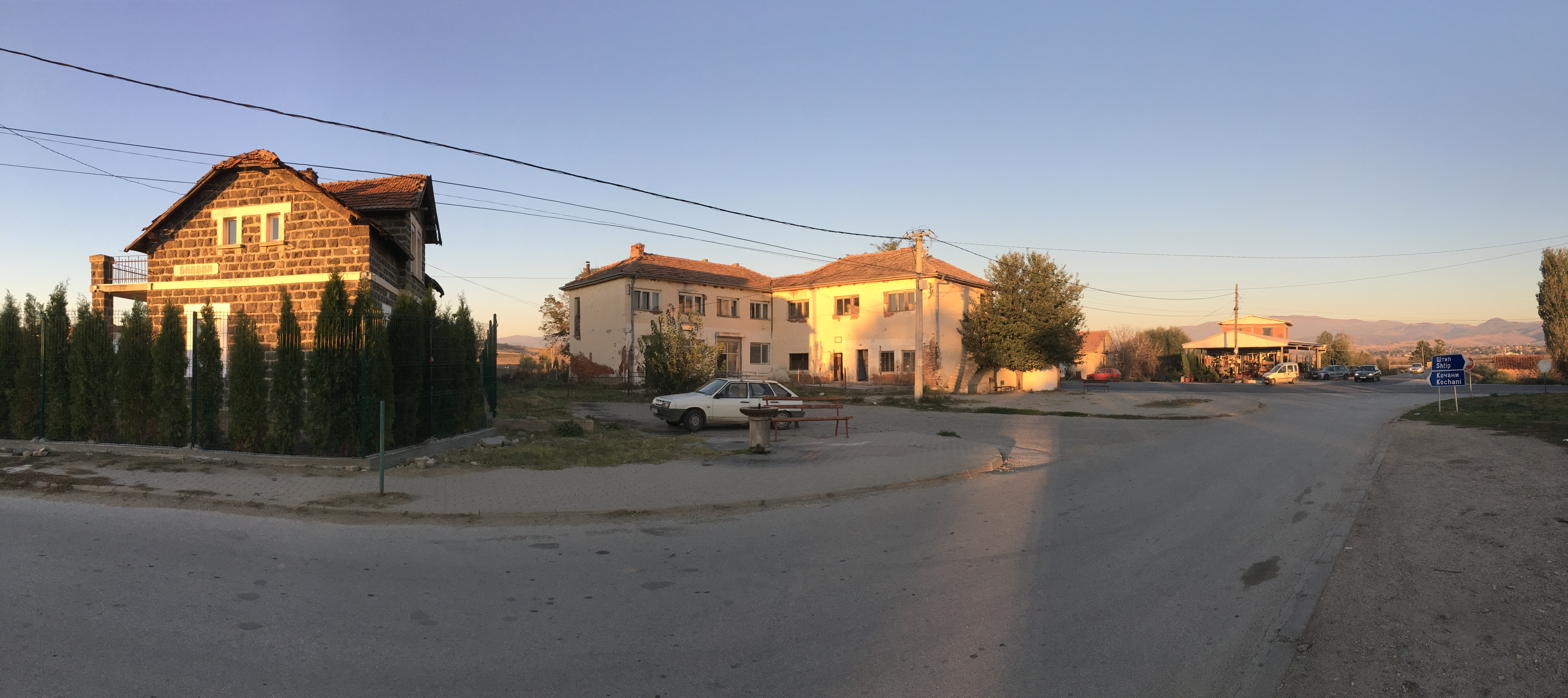
- Center of the village

- Location within North Macedonia
- Country: North Macedonia
- Region: Eastern
- Municipality: Karbinci

Population (2002)
  - Total: 358
- Time zone: UTC+1 (CET)
  - Summer (DST): UTC+2 (CEST)
- Website: .

Dolni Balvan (Macedonian: Долни Балван) is a village in the municipality of Karbinci, North Macedonia.

== Demographics ==
According to the 2002 census, the village had a total of 358 inhabitants. Ethnic groups in the village include:

- Macedonians 356
- Serbs 2

As of 2021, the village of Dolni Balvan has 310 inhabitants and the ethnic composition was the following:

- Macedonians – 291
- Person without Data - 19
