= Karbinci =

Karbinci Карбинци
- Village
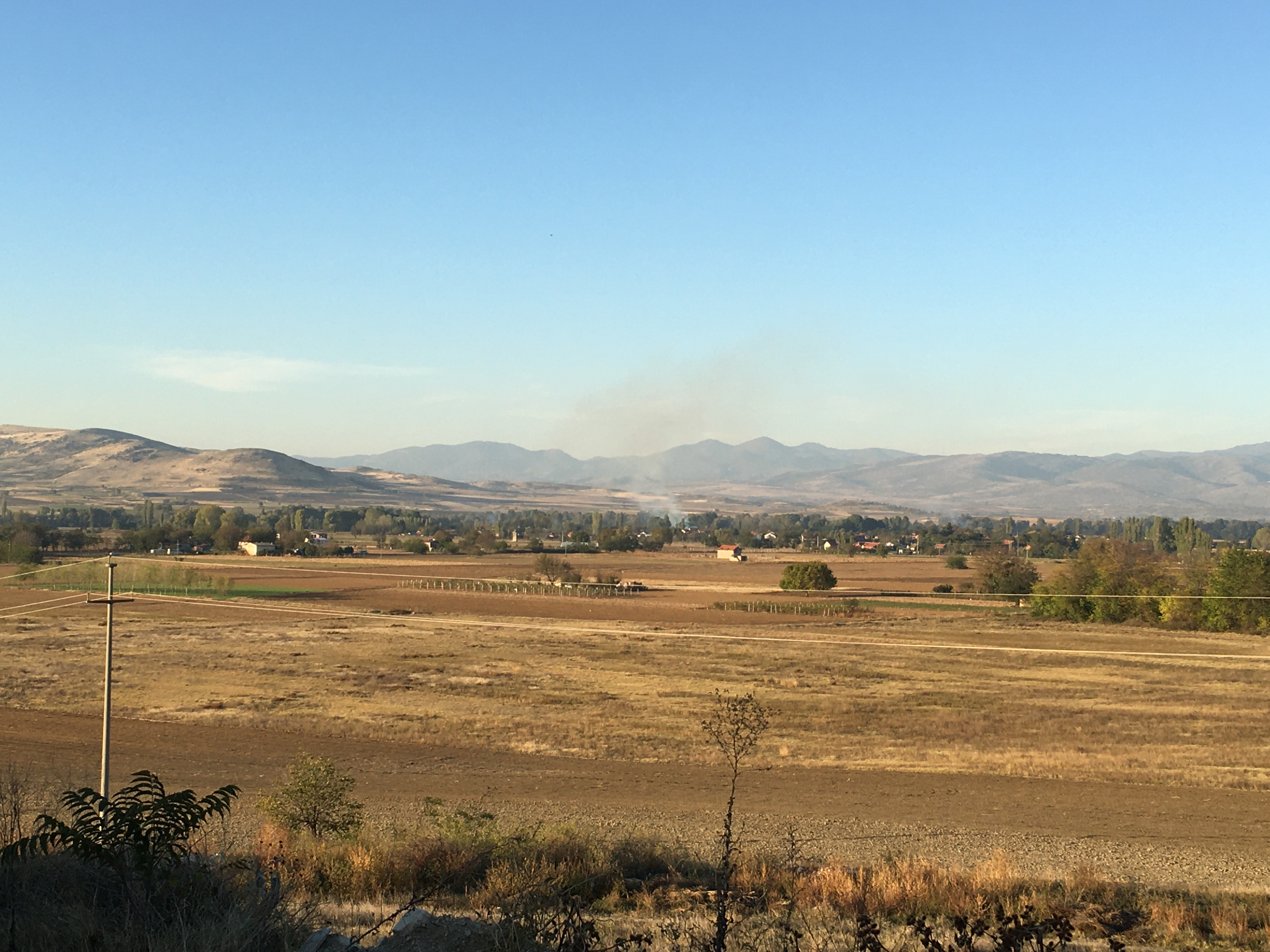
- View of the village

- Location within North Macedonia
- Country: North Macedonia
- Region: Eastern
- Municipality: Karbinci

Population (2002)
  - Total: 673
- Time zone: UTC+1 (CET)
  - Summer (DST): UTC+2 (CEST)
- Vehicle registration: ST

Karbinci (Macedonian: Карбинци) is a village in North Macedonia. It is the seat of the Karbinci municipality.

== Demographics ==
According to the 2002 census, the village had a total of 673 inhabitants. Ethnic groups in the village include:

- Macedonians 672
- Serbs 1

As of 2021, the village of Karbinci has 574 inhabitants and the ethnic composition was the following:

- Macedonians – 555
- Romani – 1
- Person without Data - 18
