= Kalauzlija =

Kalauzlija may refer to:

- Kalauzlija, Karbinci, North Macedonia
- Kalauzlija, Radoviš, North Macedonia
