= Vrteška =

Vrteška Вртешка
- Village
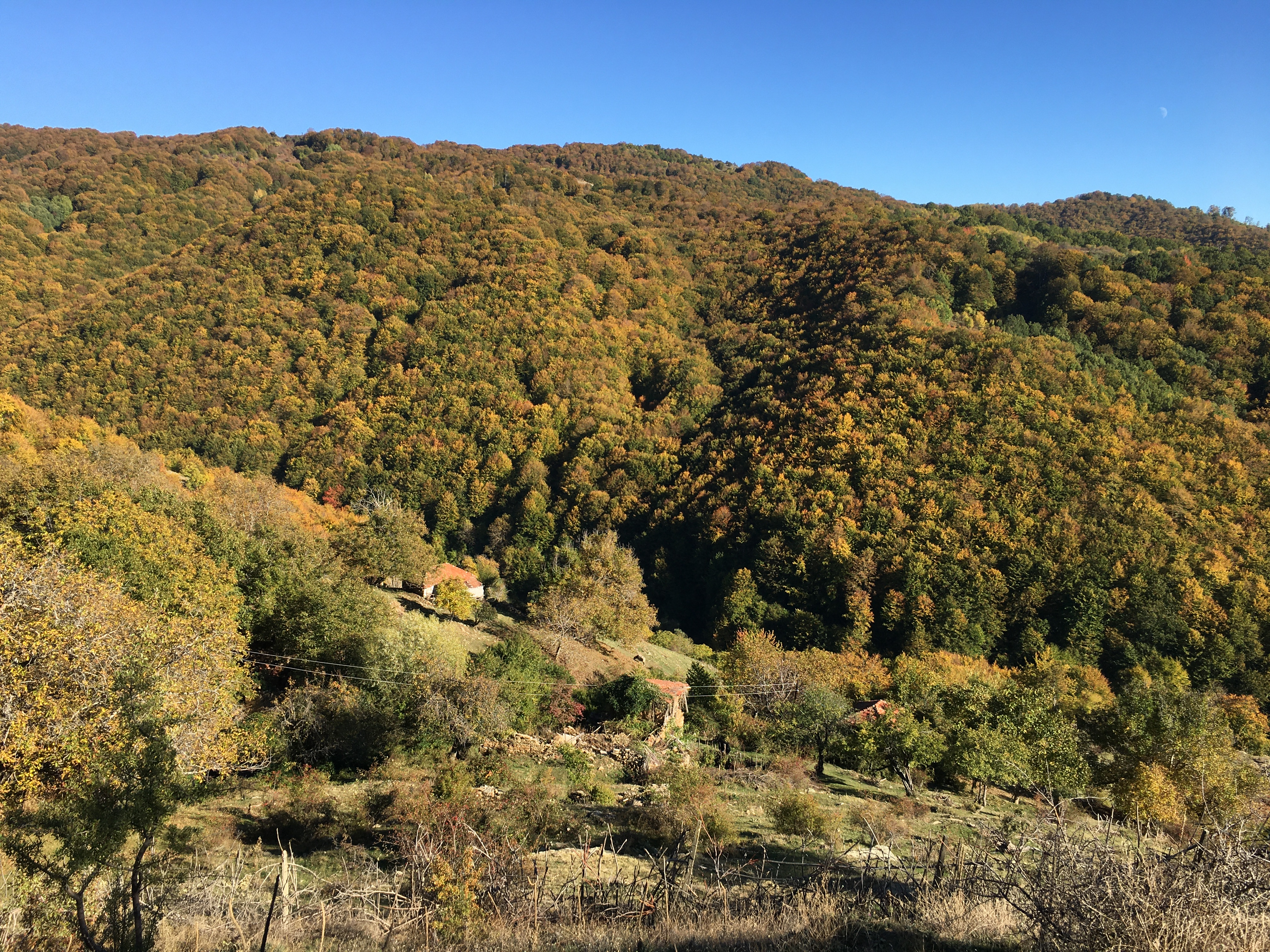
- View of the village

- Location within North Macedonia
- Country: North Macedonia
- Region: Eastern
- Municipality: Karbinci

Population (2002)
  - Total: 6
- Time zone: UTC+1 (CET)
  - Summer (DST): UTC+2 (CEST)
- Website: .

Vrteška (Macedonian: Вртешка) is a small village in the eastern part of North Macedonia, and is located by the mountain Plačkovica in Karbinci Municipality.

== Demographics ==
According to the 2002 census, the village had a total of 6 inhabitants. Ethnic groups in the village include:

- Macedonians 6
