= Karbinci Municipality =

Municipality of North Macedonia

Coordinates: 41.8167°N 22.2333°E

Municipality of Karbinci Општина Карбинци Karbinci Belediyesi
- Rural municipality
- Flag Coat of arms

- Country: North Macedonia
- Region: Eastern
- Municipal seat: Karbinci

Government
  - Mayor: Viktor Paunov (VMRO-DPMNE)

Area
  - Total: 229.7 km^{2} (88.7 sq mi)

Population
  - Total: 3,420
  - Density: 14.9/km^{2} (38.6/sq mi)
- Time zone: UTC+1 (CET)
- Postal code: 2207
- Area code: 032
- Vehicle registration: ST
- Website: http://www.OpstinaKarbinci.gov.mk/

Karbinci (Macedonian: Карбинци; Turkish: Karbinci Belediyesi) is a municipality in the eastern part of North Macedonia. Karbinci is also the name of the village where the municipal seat is located. The Karbinci Municipality is part of the Eastern Statistical Region.

== Geography ==
Karbinci, surrounding villages and neighboring municipalities

The municipality borders the Probištip Municipality, Češinovo-Obleševo Municipality and Zrnovci Municipality to the north and east, and the Radoviš Municipality and Štip Municipality to the west and south.

== Demographics ==
The 2021 North Macedonia census recorded 3,420 residents of the Karbinci Municipality. Ethnic groups in the municipality:

	2002		2021	
	Number	%	Number	%
TOTAL	4,012	100	3,420	100
Macedonians	3,200	79.76	2,159	63.13
Turks	728	18.15	857	25.06
Roma	2	0.05	15	0.44
Vlachs	54	1.35	10	0.29
Serbs	12	0.29	7	0.2
Other / Undeclared / Unknown	16	0.4	4	0.12
Persons for whom data are taken from administrative sources			368	10.76

=== Demographic Trends ===
- Live births by ethnic affiliation of mother, 2010-2021

Year	Macedonians		Turks		Roma		Others		TOTAL
Year	Births	%	Births	%	Births	%	Births	%	Births
2010	31	50.00	31	50.00	0	0.00	0	0.00	62
2011	27	54.00	23	46.00	0	0.00	0	0.00	50
2012	33	50.77	32	49.23	0	0.00	0	0.00	65
2013	17	36.17	29	61.70	0	0.00	1	2.13	47
2014	23	51.11	21	46.67	1	2.22	0	0.00	45
2015	24	50.00	22	45.83	2	4.17	0	0.00	48
2016	24	46.15	28	53.85	0	0.00	0	0.00	52
2017	45	65.22	24	34.78	0	0.00	0	0.00	69
2018	18	52.94	15	44.12	1	2.94	0	0.00	34
2019	24	51.06	21	44.68	2	4.26	0	0.00	47
2020	19	54.29	13	37.14	1	2.86	2	5.71	35
2021	16	51.61	15	48.39	0	0.00	0	0.00	31
2022	--	--	--	--	--	--	--	--	37

== Inhabited places ==
The number of inhabited places in the municipality is 29.

Inhabited places in the Karbinci Municipality
Villages: Argulica | Batanje | Vrteška | Golem Gaber | Gorni Balvan | Gorno Trogerci | Dolni Balvan | Dolno Trogerci | Ebeplija | Junuzlija | Kalauzlija | Karbinci | Kepekçelija | Kozjak | Krupište | Kurfalija | Kučilat | Kučica | Mal Gaber | Mičak | Muratlija | Nov Karaorman | Odžalija | Pripečani | Prnalija | Radanje | Ruljak | Tarinci | Crvulevo
