= Turks in North Macedonia =

Ethnic group

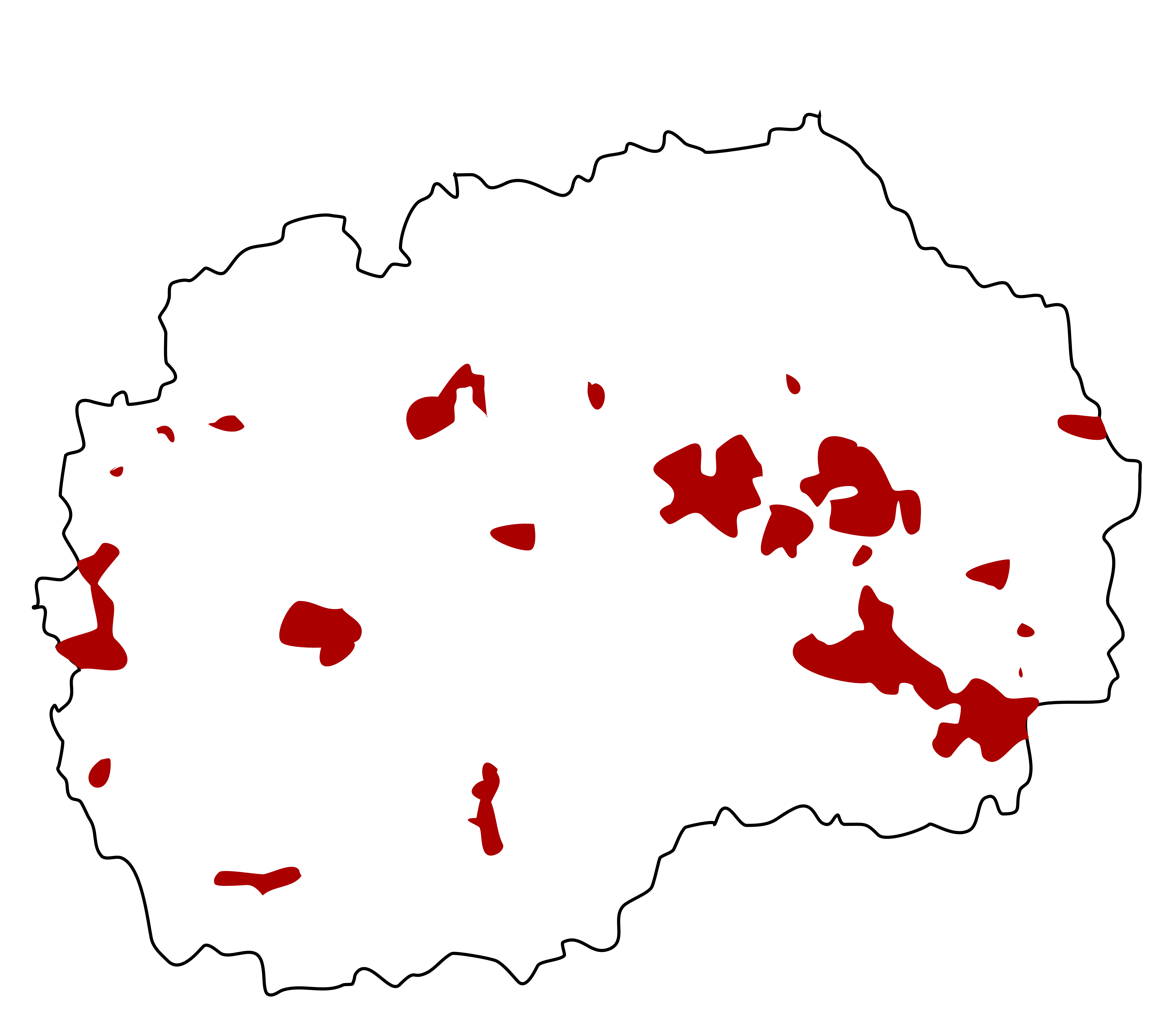
- On municipal level On settlement level

Total population
- 70,961 (2021 census); 3.86% of total population

Regions with significant populations
- Plasnica; Skopje; Gostivar; Strumica; Radoviš; Bitola; Tetovo; Resen

Languages
- Balkan Turkish; Turkish; Macedonian

Religion
- Sunni Islam

Turks in North Macedonia, also known as Turkish Macedonians and Macedonian Turks, (Macedonian: Македонски Турци, romanized: Makedonski Turci, Turkish: Makedonya Türkleri) are the ethnic Turks who constitute the third-largest ethnic group in the Republic of North Macedonia. According to the 2021 census, there were 70,961 Turks living in the country, forming a minority of some 3.86% of the population. The community forms a majority in Centar Župa and Plasnica.

== History ==
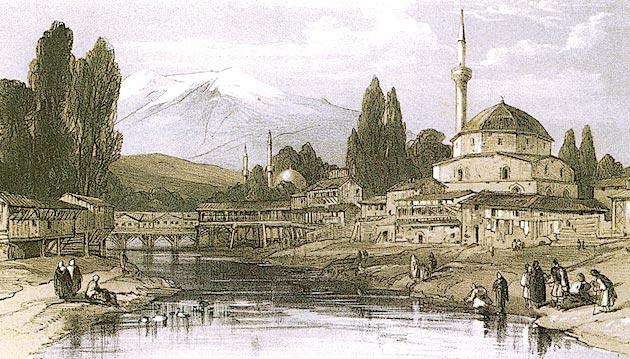
Bitola in the 19th century

=== Ottoman era ===
Macedonia came under the rule of the Ottoman Turks in 1392, remaining part of the Ottoman Empire for more than 500 years up to 1912 and the Balkan Wars. Ali Rıza Efendi - Mustafa Kemal Atatürk's father comes from Kodžadžik, in Centar Župa Municipality, where there is a memorial house. There is a sizeable amount of Turkified Albanians in Ohrid who originate from the cities of Elbasan, Durrës and Ulcinj. A significant part of the Muslim Albanian population of Kumanovo and Bitola was also Turkified during Ottoman rule.

A sizeable part of the Turkish community in Prilep was of Albanian origin. Serbian historiographer Jovan Hadži-Vasiljević writes that:

"Between Turks and Muslim Albanians who have lived in the city (Prilep), it is very difficult to distinguish, especially between the old families of the city. The Mohammedan Albanian families, as soon as they arrived in the city, merged with the Turks,..."

The Bulgarian researcher Vasil Kanchov wrote in 1900 that many Albanians declared themselves as Turks. In Skopje, Bitola, Resen, Ohrid, Struga, Tetovo and Gostivar, the population that declared itself Turkish "was of Albanian blood", but it "had been Turkified after the Ottoman invasion, including Skanderbeg", referring to Islamization. Yordan Ivanov, professor at the University of Sofia, wrote in 1915 that Albanians, since they did not have their own alphabet, due to a lack of consolidated national consciousness and influenced by foreign propaganda, declared themselves as Turks, Greeks and Bulgarians, depending on which religion they belonged to. Albanians were losing their mother tongue in Bitola, Ohrid, Struga and Skopje. The researcher Dimitar Gađanov wrote in 1916 that Gostivar was populated by 4,000 Albanians "who were Turkified", 100 Orthodox Albanians and 3,500 Bulgarians, while the surrounding area was predominantly Albanian.

German linguist Gustav Weigand describes the process of Turkification of the Albanian urban population in his 1923 work Ethnographie Makedoniens (Ethnography of Macedonia). He writes that in the cities, especially noting Skopje and Bitola, many of the Turkish inhabitants are in fact Albanians, being distinguished by the difference in articulation of certain Turkish words, as well as their clothing and tool use. They speak Albanian at home, however use Turkish when in public. They refer to themselves as Turks, the term at the time also being a synonym for Muslim, with ethnic Turks referring to them as Turkoshak, a derogatory term for someone portraying themselves as Turkish.

=== Yugoslav era ===
Once the Ottoman Empire fell at the beginning of the 20th century, many of the Turks fled to Turkey. Many left under Yugoslav rule, and more left after World War II. Others intermarried or simply identified themselves as Macedonians or Albanians to avoid stigma and persecution.

During the Skopje communist party conference held on August 12–13, 1945, Kemal Sejfula, a representative of the Turkish minority and future mayor of Skopje (1951–54), although himself of Albanian origin from Kaçanik, declared that: "In the cities there are some regroupings - differentiations between Turks and Albanians. As it is known that the great Serbian policy towards the Albanian masses was a policy of physical liquidations. While the policy towards the Turks - was more tolerant, for which a very large part of the Albanians became Turks - were assimilated." A policy of Turkification of the Albanian population was employed by the Yugoslav authorities in cooperation with the Turkish government, stretching the period of 1948–1959. A commission was created to tour Albanian communities in Macedonia, visiting Tetovo, Gostivar, Debar, Kičevo, Struga, Kumanovo, Gjorče Petrov and Resen. Starting in 1948, six Turkish schools were opened in areas with large Albanian majorities, such as Tearce, Gorna Banjica, Dolna Banjica Vrapčište as well as in the outskirts of Tetovo and Gostivar. In 1951-52, a total of 40 Turkish schools were opened in Debar, Kičevo, Kumanovo, Struga, Resen, Bitola, Kruševo and Prilep.

Contemporary analysis described cases of resistance to the Turkish schools in the Polog area, with Albanian speaking students and teachers refused to attend Turkish schools. In Tetovo, none of the native teachers wanted to give lessons in Turkish, so substitutes from Skopje were brought in instead. Another notable case happened in Gostivar, where a teacher from Banjica, who according to the committees analysis: "even though he was born in the same village and his mother tongue is Turkish, when the Turkish school was opened he refused to teach in Turkish and had asked to work in Albanian villages ...". Thus the Yugoslav committee characterized the local population as having adopted a "Greater Albanian political worldview". Resistance against the opening of Turkish schools was most prevalent in Tetovo and Gostivar. In 1952, on the night of Eid al-Adha, the local Tetovo political leader Mehmet Riza Gega distributed flyers imploring Albanian parents from sending their children to Turkish speaking schools. In Gostivar the nationalist activist Myrtezan Bajraktari was detained and interrogated by the Yugoslav secret police (UDBA). During his interrogation he stated he openly opposed the Turkish schools, and that he does so "just so Albanians can feel like patriots and not allow themselves to be Turkified."

In the 1953 census, large portions of Albanians declared themselves as ethnic Turks:

- In the municipality of Lipkovo, 12,733 Albanians were registered in 1948 a number which dropped to 3609 in 1953. The Turkish population went from numbering 5 people in 1948, to 9,878 in 1953.
- In the municipality of Radostuša, 2,252 Albanians were registered in 1948 and 410 in 1953, with the Turkish community going from 7 members in 1948, to numbering 2,453 in 1953.
- In the municipality of Demir Hisar, 964 Albanians were registered in 1948 and 50 in 1953, with the Turkish community going from 6 members in 1948, to numbering 1,027 in 1953.
- In the municipality of Dolneni, 4,786 Albanians were registered in 1948 and 174 in 1953, with the Turkish community going from 1,005 members in 1948, to numbering 6,450 in 1953.
- In the municipality of Krivogaštani, 594 Albanians were registered in 1948 and 12 in 1953, with the Turkish community going from 2 members in 1948, to numbering 656 in 1953.
- In the municipality of Kruševo, 2,335 Albanians were registered in 1948 and 1,265 in 1953, with the Turkish community going from 3 members in 1948, to numbering 1,269 in 1953.
- In the then municipality of Tabanovce, 3,372 Albanians were registered in 1948 and 476 in 1953, with the Turkish community going from 436 members in 1948, to numbering 3,434 in 1953.
- In the municipality of Kičevo, 1,187 Albanians were registered in 1948 and 413 in 1953, with the Turkish community going from 1,748 members in 1948, to numbering 5,192 in 1953.
- In the municipality of Butel, 4,755 Albanians were registered in 1948 and 2,958 in 1953, with the Turkish community going from 14 members in 1948, to numbering 2,204 in 1953.
- In the municipality of Gjorče Petrov, 12,443 Albanians were registered in 1948 and 8,827 in 1953, with the Turkish community going from 48 members in 1948, to numbering 4,783 in 1953.
- In the municipality of Kumanovo, 3,919 Albanians were registered in 1948 and 1,331 in 1953, with the Turkish community going from 1,793 members in 1948, to numbering 5,622 in 1953.
- In the municipality of Tetovo, 22,631 Albanians were registered in 1948 and 20,873 in 1953, with the Turkish community going from 306 members in 1948, to numbering 4,516 in 1953.
- In the then municipality of Dračevo, 7,006 Albanians were registered in 1948 and in 5,745 1953, with the Turkish community going from 178 members in 1948, to numbering 5,195 in 1953.
- In the municipality of Bitola, 13,166 Albanians were registered in 1948 and 4,014 in 1953, with the Turkish community going from 14,050 members in 1948, to numbering 29,151 in 1953.
- In the municipality of Rakotince, 2,494 Albanians were registered in 1948 and 1,362 in 1953, with the Turkish community going from 60 members in 1948, to numbering 4,538 in 1953.

After 1953, a large emigration of Turks based on an agreement between the Republic of Turkey and Socialist Federal Republic of Yugoslavia took place— around 80,000 according to Yugoslav data and over 150,000 according to Turkish sources. Of the 203,087 Turks in Macedonia in 1953, 15.88% or 32,392 gave Macedonian as their mother tongue, and 13.28% or 27,086 gave Albanian as their mother tongue. During the 2010s, some Torbeši maintained a strong affiliation to Turkish identity.

Population of Macedonian Turks according to national censuses
Census	Turks	Total population of North Macedonia	% Turks
1948 Census	95,940	1,152,986	8.3%
1953 Census	203,938³	1,304,514	15.6%
1961 Census	131,484	1,406,003	9.4%
1971 Census	108,552	1,647,308	6.6%
1981 Census	86,591	1,909,136	4.5%
1991 Census	77,080	2,033,964	3.8%
1994 Census	78,019	1,945,932	4.0%
2002 Census	77,959	2,022,547	3.85%
2021 Census	70,961	1,836,713	3.86%

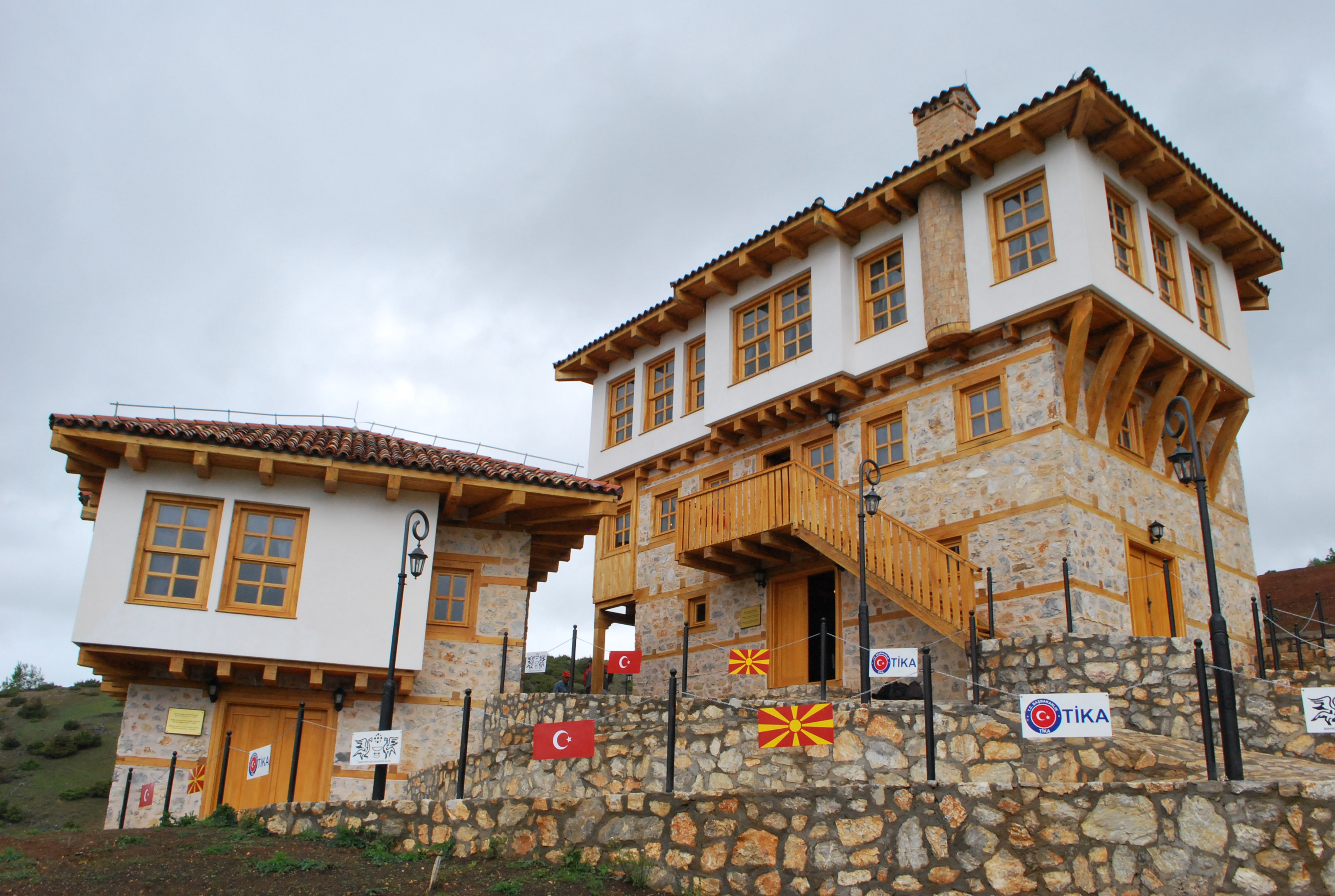
The reconstructed house of Ali Rıza Efendi's family, in Kodžadžik, North Macedonia

== Culture ==
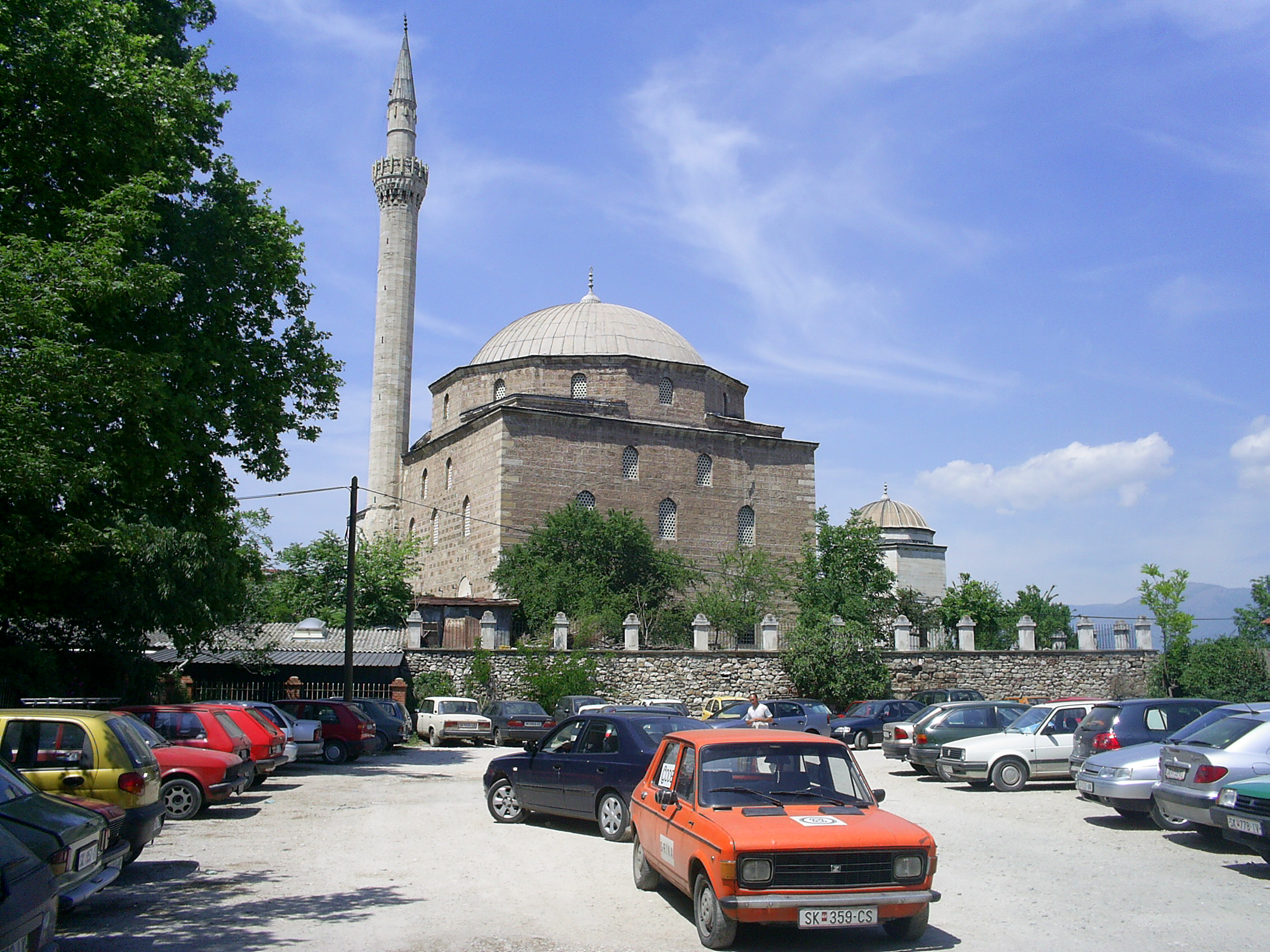
Mustapha Pasha Mosque

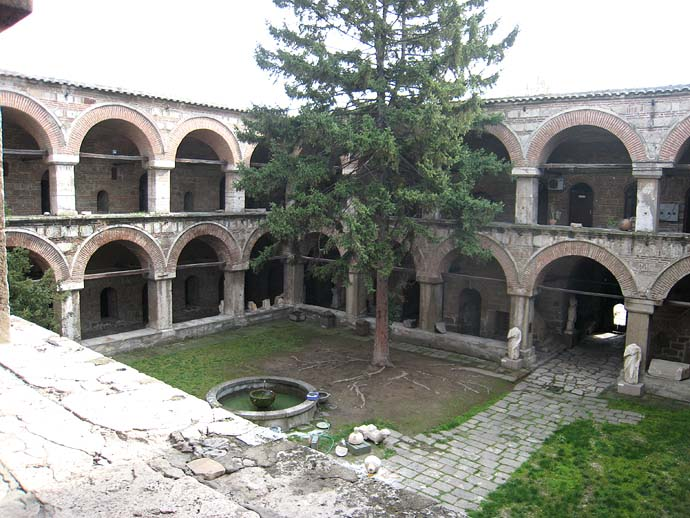
The Kuršumli Han is one of many Turkish landmarks in the Old Bazaar, Skopje

=== Language ===
Macedonian Turks speak the Turkish language and secondly Albanian in the west and Macedonian in the east. Turkish is spoken with Slavic and Greek admixtures creating a unique Macedonian Turkish dialect. However, Macedonian is also widely used amongst the community. Per the 2021 census, 62,623 individuals declared Turkish as their mother tongue, compared to 70,961 declaring Turkish ethnicity.

=== Religion ===
According to the 2002 census, Turks make up 12% of the total Muslim population in Macedonia.

== Demographics ==
Turkish population in Macedonia according to the 2002 census (Turkish majority in bold):

Municipality	Turks 2002 census	% Turkish
Greater Skopje	8,595	1.7%
Gostivar	7,597	12.71%
**Centar Župa**	2,899	77.93%
**Plasnica**	**4,101**	97.13%
Radoviš	4,013	16.64%
Strumica	3,927	7.85%
Struga	3,472	6.81%
Studeničani	3,231	14.71%
Vrapčište	3,099	15.62%
Kičevo	2,553	6.44%
Debar	2,733	17.73%
Mavrovo and Rostuša	1,555	30.8%
Dolneni	2,434	18.54%
Ohrid	1,831	3.56%
Vasilevo	2,251	21.33%
Tetovo	1,746	2.06%
Resen	1,457	10.14%
Veles	1,037	2.14%
Bitola	1,174	1.38%
Valandovo	1,412	13.44%
Štip	1,272	2.7%
Bogovinje	1,183	4.1%
Prilep	1,060	1.54%
Karbinci	857	25.06%
Konče	606	22.24%
Tearce	382	1.66%
Bosilovo	677	5.88%
Dojran	211	6.84%
Čaška	391	5.1%
Pehčevo	357	6.5%
Demir Kapija	376	9.95%
Kočani	315	0.8%
Kruševo	283	3.38%
Kumanovo	292	0.3%
Vinica	272	1.4%
Negotino	349	1.92%
Sopište	463	6.9%
Mogila	266	5.04%
Makedonski Brod	241	4.09%
Kavadarci	134	0.38%
Lozovo	203	8.97%
Delčevo	122	0.7%
Berovo	91	0.7%
Sveti Nikole	81	0.4%
Petrovec	75	0.9%
Gradsko	71	1.9%
Bogdanci	54	0.6%
Demir Hisar	35	0.4%
Gevgelija	31	0.1%
Novaci	27	0.8%
Ilinden	17	0.1%
Kratovo	8	0.1%
Probištip	6	<0.1%
Jegunovce	4	<0.1%
Brvenica	2	<0.1%
Debarca	2	<0.1%
Kriva Palanka	2	<0.1%
Želino	2	<0.1%
Zelenikovo	1	<0.1%

== Diaspora ==
Flag of Skopje Turks

Since the 1960s, Macedonia Turks have migrated to several Western European countries. For example, there are approximately 5,000 Macedonian Turks in Sweden; around 90% (or 4,500) live in Malmö. In 1973 they formed the Turkish-Swedish KSF Prespa Birlik football club. There are also Turkish Macedonian communities in other European countries, including Austria, Belgium, Czech Republic, Germany Italy, the Netherlands, Slovakia, and Switzerland.

In addition, Turkish Macedonian communities have also been formed in North America. In 1960, the Macedonian Patriotic Organization reported that a handful of Turkish Macedonians in the United States "have expressed solidarity with the M.P.O.'s aims, and have made contributions to its financial needs."

== National day ==
The Turks in North Macedonia also have an own national day, the Day of Education in Turkish Language. By a decision of the Government of the Republic of Macedonia in 2007, December 21 became a national and non-working day for the Turkish community in the country.

== Media ==
There are both radio and television broadcasts in Turkish. Since 1945, Macedonian Radio-Television transmits one hour daily Turkish television programs and four and a half hours of Turkish radio programs. Furthermore, the newspaper Birlik is published in Turkish three times a week.

== Politics ==
The Turks have 3 political parties in North Macedonia: Democratic Party of Turks (Türk Demokratik Partisi - TDP), Turkish Movement Party (Türk Hareket Partisi - THP) and Turkish National Unity Movement (Türk Millî Birlik Hareketi - TMBH). There is also the Union of Turkish NGOs in Republic of Macedonia (Makedonya Türk Sivil Toplum Teşkilatlar Birliği - MATÜSİTEB).

The first political party of the Turks in Macedonia is the Turkish Democratic Party (TDP). Because of political and economic changes in Macedonia, the Turks, like other communities, have decided to get organized in order to protect and develop their political rights. As a result, a political association named the Turkish Democratic Union was established on 1 July 1990. The association identified its major goal to defend national and moral interests of the Turks in Macedonia and launched activities in this direction. Such developments allowed the Turks to transform their association into a political party. The transformation was completed on 27 June 1992, when the Turkish Democratic Union was renamed the Turkish Democratic Party at the second extraordinary congress under the leadership Avni Engüllü in Skopje. Since its establishment, TDP has been protecting the rights and interests of Turks in Macedonia.

Moreover, several people of Turkish origin serve in high-ranking levels of Macedonian politics. Furkan Çako from the Turkish Democratic Party (TDP) serves as Minister without Portfolio in the Macedonian government. In the parliament, the Turks are represented by Kenan Hasip, TDP leader, and Enes Ibrahim (THP). In addition, Salih Murat, an ethnic Turk, is a member of the Constitutional Court of North Macedonia.

== Education ==
The first school in Turkish language in Macedonia was opened in 1944.

== See also ==
- Turkish minorities in the former Ottoman Empire
- Turks in the Balkans
- North Macedonia–Turkey relations
- Languages of North Macedonia
- Islam in North Macedonia
- Macedonians in Turkey

== Bibliography ==
- Abrahams, Fred (1996), A Threat to "Stability": Human Rights Violations in Macedonia, Human Rights Watch, ISBN 1-56432-170-3.
- Dawisha, Karen; Parrott, Bruce (1997), Politics, power, and the struggle for democracy in South-East Europe, Cambridge University Press, ISBN 0-521-59733-1.
- Gaber, Natasha; Joveska, Aneta (2004), Macedonian census results – controversy or reality? (PDF), South-East Europe Review, pp. 99–110, archived from the original (PDF) on 2011-07-16
- Evans, Thammy (2010), Macedonia, Bradt Travel Guides, ISBN 978-1-84162-297-2.
- Knowlton, MaryLee (2005), Macedonia, Marshall Cavendish, ISBN 0-7614-1854-7.
- Minahan, James (1998), Miniature Empires: A Historical Dictionary of the Newly Independent States, Greenwood Publishing Group, ISBN 0-313-30610-9.
- Nielsen, Jørgen S.; Akgonul, Samim; Alibasic, Ahmet (2009), Yearbook of Muslims in Europe, Volume 1, BRILL, ISBN 978-90-04-17505-1.
- Ortakovski, Vladimir T (2001), "Interethnic Relations and Minorities in the Republic of Macedonia" (PDF), Southeast European Politics, 2 (1): 25–45
- Oustinova-Stjepanovic, Galina (2008), Religion and Politics of Sufi Turks in Macedonia A pre-field proposal (PDF), University College London
- Republic of Macedonia State Statistical Office (2005), Census of Population, Households and Dwellings in the Republic of Macedonia, 2002 (PDF), Republic of Macedonia — State Statistical Office
