= Eastern Statistical Region =

Coordinates: 41.9300°N 22.4000°E

Eastern Statistical Region Источен Регион
- Statistical region
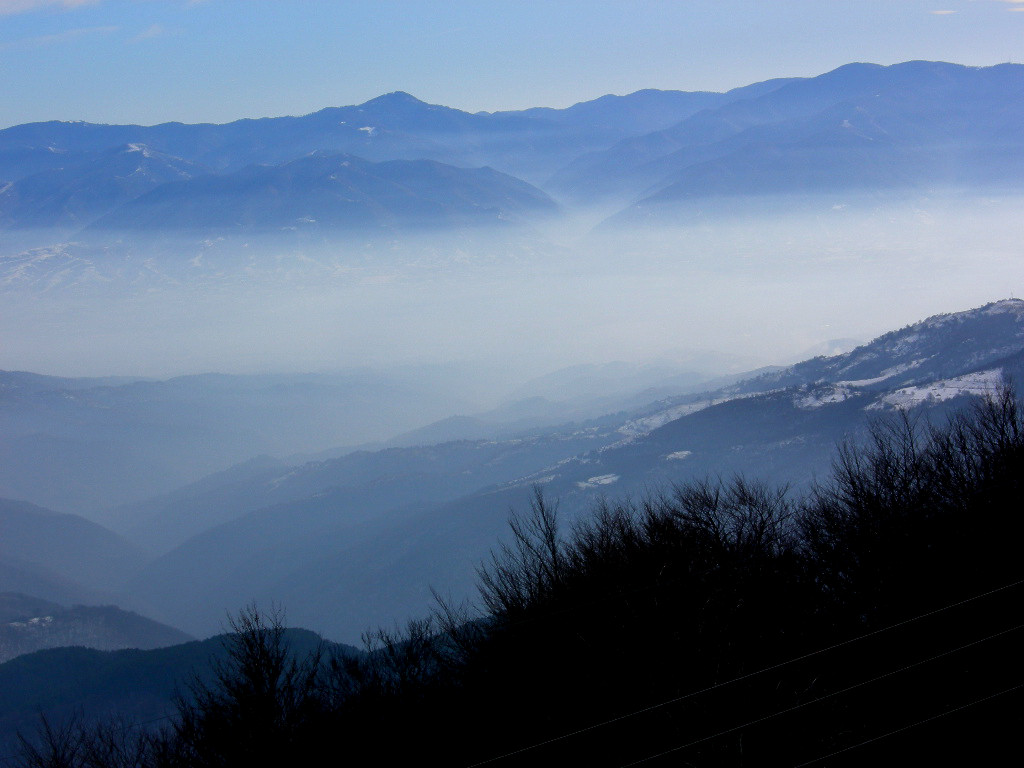
- Mountains on the Border with Bulgaria

- Flag

- Country: North Macedonia

Area
  - Total: 3,539 km^{2} (1,366 sq mi)

Population (2021)
  - Total: 150,234
  - Density: 42.45/km^{2} (109.9/sq mi)
- HDI (2017): 0.741 high · 5th of 8

The Eastern Statistical Region (Macedonian: Источен Регион, romanized: Istočen Region) is one of eight statistical regions of North Macedonia. Eastern, located in the eastern part of the country, borders Bulgaria. Internally, it borders the Vardar, Skopje, Northeastern, and Southeastern statistical regions.

== Municipalities ==
The municipalities of the region

The Eastern Statistical Region is divided into 11 municipalities:

- Berovo Municipality
- Češinovo-Obleševo
- Delčevo Municipality
- Karbinci Municipality
- Kočani Municipality
- Makedonska Kamenica Municipality
- Pehčevo Municipality
- Probištip Municipality
- Štip Municipality
- Vinica
- Zrnovci Municipality

== Demographics ==
=== Population ===
The current population of the Eastern Statistical Region is 150,234 citizens or 8.2% of the total population of the Republic of North Macedonia, according to the last population census in 2021.

Census Year	Population	Change
1994	180,039	N/A
2002	181,858	+1.01%
2021	150,234	-13.38%

=== Ethnicities ===
The largest ethnic group in the region are the Macedonians.

	2002		2021	
	Number	%	Number	%
TOTAL	181,858	100	150,234	100
Macedonians	168,046	92.4	126,553	84.24
Roma	6,929	3.81	6,126	4.08
Turks	3,163	1.74	2,958	1.97
Vlachs	2,535	1.39	1,892	1.26
Serbs	594	0.33	330	0.22
Albanians	20	0.01	101	0.07
Bosniaks	25	0.02	45	0.02
Others / Undeclared / Unknown	546	0.3	795	0.53
Persons for whom data are taken from administrative sources			11,434	7.61
