= Bregalnica =

Second largest river in North Macedonia

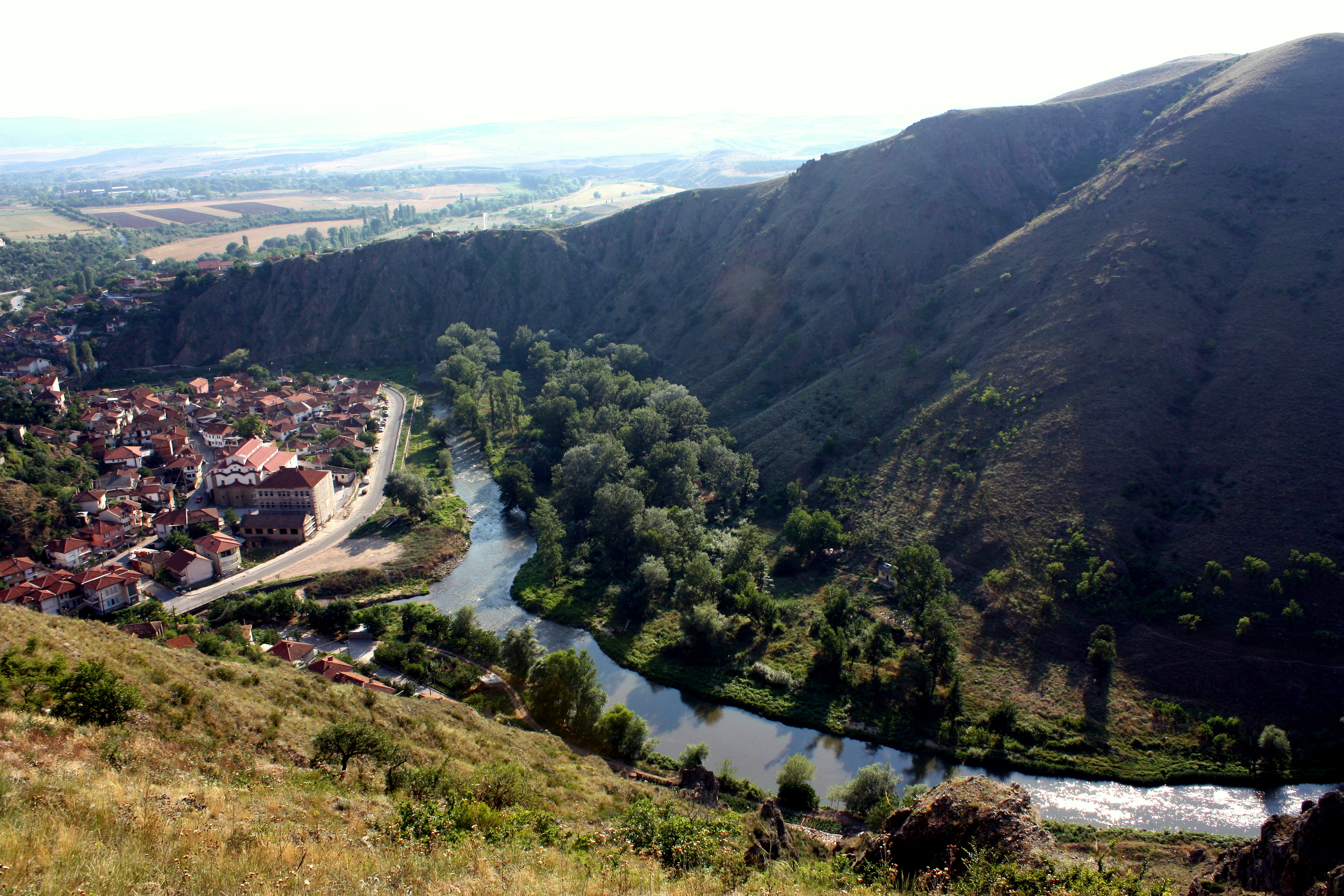
- Native name: Брегалница (Macedonian)

Location
- Country: North Macedonia

Physical characteristics
- Source
  - location: Maleševo Mountains close to Pehchevo
- Mouth
  - location: Vardar
  - coordinates: 41.6059°N 21.9201°E
- Length: 211.5 km (131.4 mi)
- Basin size: 4,307 km^{2} (1,663 sq mi)

Basin features
- Progression: Vardar→ Aegean Sea
- Tributaries
  - left: Ratevska, Osojnica, Zrnovska, Kozjacka, Otinja, Lakavica
  - right: Zelevica, Kamenicka, Orizarska, Kocanska, Zletovica, Svetinikolska

Bregalnica (Macedonian: Брегалница, pronounced [brɛˈɡalnit͡sa]) is the second largest river in North Macedonia. It starts as a spring near the mountain city of Pehchevo and it passes through Berovo, Delchevo, near the cities of Makedonska Kamenica, Kočani, Vinica and Štip, before joining the river Vardar on its way to the Aegean Sea. Recent issues have concentrated around the pollution of the river, as many of the factories located in the cities through which it passes used it as a dumping ground for waste waters, which is further aggravated with the pesticide-treated waters of the extensive rice fields near the city of Kočani. It was the place of Battle of Bregalnica.

== The Bregalnica watershed ==
The Bregalnica watershed as defined by the Bregalnica River Basin Management Project in 2013 comprises a territory of 4'307 km^{2}, which is approximately 21% of the Vardar watershed in North Macedonia and about 17% of the overall territory of the country. The Bregalnica watershed borders with Bulgaria in the east, Strumica River catchment in the south, Pcunja River in the north, and Vardar River in the west. The average altitude of the Bregalnica watershed is 722 m a.s.l. The Bregalnica river catchment encompasses the territory of the whole East Planning Region. This includes the municipalities of Berovo, Češinovo-Obleševo, Delčevo, Karbinci, Makedonska Kamenica, Kočani, Pehčevo, Probištip, Štip, Vinica and Zrnovci. It also includes almost the complete territories of Lozovo and Sveti Nikole municipalities (Vardar Region), of Konče Municipality (South-Eastern Region), and a significant portion of the territory of the Kratovo Municipality (25%). Even though the Bregalnica catchment boundary mainly coincides with the municipal boundaries, minor parts of the territory of Radoviš, Negotino, Gradsko, Veles, Kumanovo and Kriva Palanka fall into it as well.

=== Geology ===
In terms of geology, the eastern part of North Macedonia including the Bregalnica basin belongs to the Rodopic system (Serbian-Macedonian massif) containing mostly crystallized shales and granites. The formation of these mountains occurred in the Paleozoic, with faults introduced later in the Tertiary. Nowadays, the watershed is characterized by a very varied relief structure, which includes plains, valleys, hilly areas, and mountainous areas.

=== Climate ===
The climate in the Bregalnica catchment is relatively arid, falling predominantly into the modified-continental climate type. Summers are long and dry, often with temperatures as high as +41 °C, together with mild and wet winters. Rarely, temperatures can get as low as −22 °C in winter. The average mean annual temperature in the plains is 12.9 °C, and in higher parts, such as Maleshevo around 8.7 °C. The average annual precipitation in the region varies between 506 Millimeters in Kochansko Pole and 672 mm in Maleshevo. Rainfall is maximal in the months of April and May, and minimal in the summer months of July and August. Snow may fall from December until March.

=== Flora and fauna ===
Specific climatic conditions, as well as the geological diversity in the region, create conditions for a heterogeneous natural vegetation and differentiation of altitude belts. The region is home to multiple plant communities, including geographically restricted national endemics (e.g. Salvia jurisicii). The abundance of forests in the region is linked to 25 different tree species, with multiple subspecies. The forests have an important function in increasing water storage and reducing soil erosion as well as in maintaining biological diversity. The total forested area in the catchment is 1'157 km^{2} or around 27% of the territory of the region.

There exists a great variety of animal species in the region, comprising amphibians, reptiles, insects, birds and mammals. The group of birds and mammals form numerous associations with a large number of individual animals that can be found from the lowest to the highest altitudes. In the forests, the fauna is particularly rich.

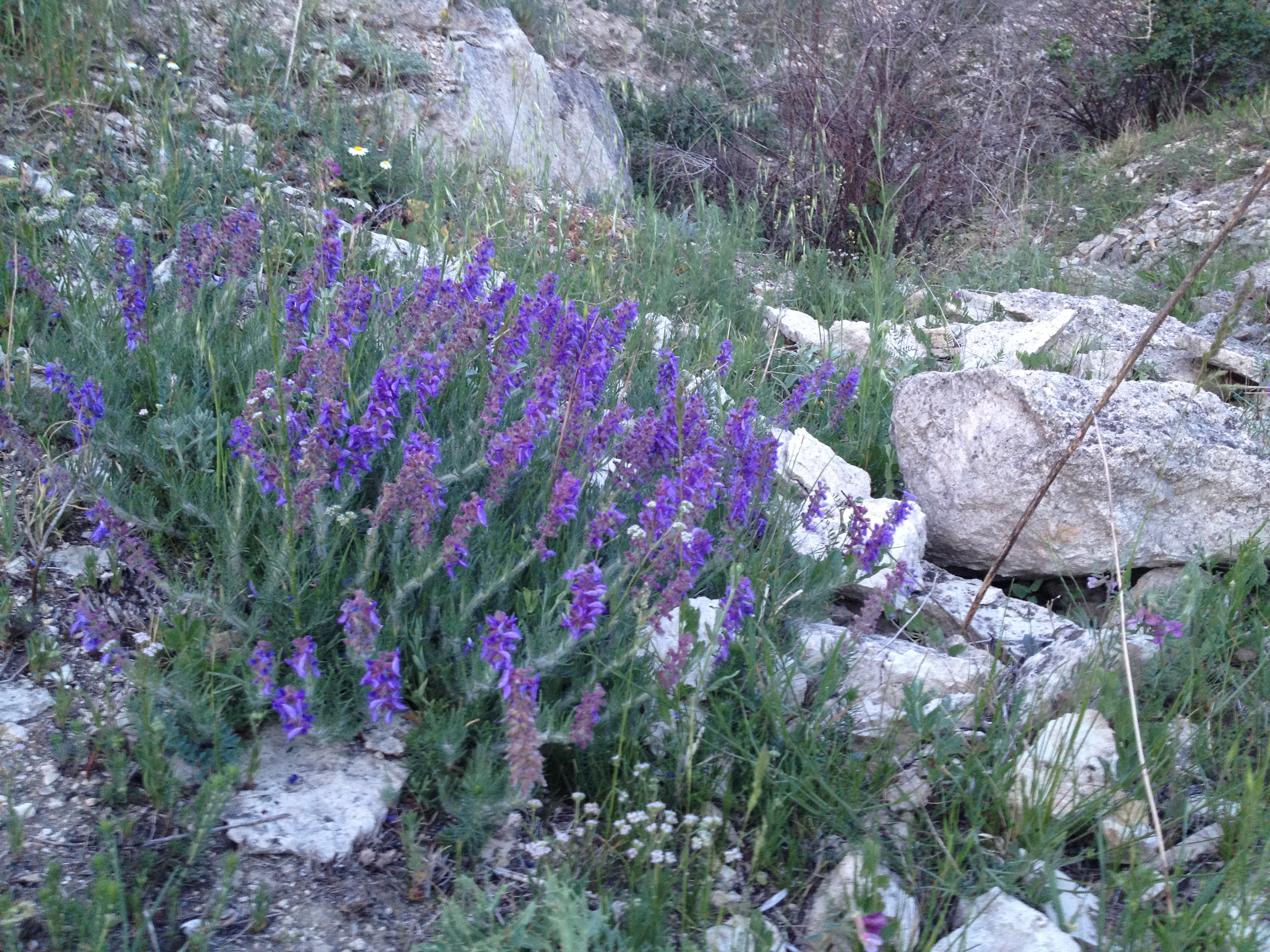
The critically endangered sage species Salvia jurisicii is endemic to the steppe-like Ovche Pole basin, part of the Bregalncia Watershed.

=== Resources ===
The region is rich in mineral resources, including important lead–zinc mines in Zletovo, Dobrevo and Makedonska Kamenica. The presence of copper and iron-titanium minerals has been established in the Osogovo massif. On the territory of Delcevo, gold deposits as well as alluvial gold in river deposits from the Bregalnica river have been found. Finally, there is a major copper mine (the Bucim) near Radoviš.

=== Demography ===
In the country context, the region is relatively sparsely populated with around 50.6 inhabitants per km^{2}, compared to 82.7 in North Macedonia. The average age is 40 years, which is higher than the national average. The education level is average as for the country. The unemployment rate is lower than the national average (18.5%). The net average salary in 2012 is the lowest in the country (MKD 14'957 per month), at 71.6% of the national average. Over the last two decades, a lack of higher education employment opportunities in most rural settlements resulted in a population migration to the towns and abroad. The main economic activities in the region are mining and industry, followed by services, trade and agriculture.

== The Bregalnica River ==
The Bregalnica watershed according to the Bregalnica River Basin Management Project, covers a territory of 4,307 km^{2}, which is about 21% of the Vardar River watershed and 17% of the total territory of the country. The average altitude of the Bregalnica basin is 772 m. The Bregalnica river has 6 tributaries on the left side (Ratevska, Osojnica, Zrnovska, Kozjacka, Otinja, and Lakavica) and 6 tributaries on the right side (Zelevica, Kamenicka, Orizarska, Kocanska, Zletovica and Svetinikolska). Along the river, 6 major reservoirs have been constructed: Lake Berovsko/Ratevsko, Kalimanci, Gradce, Zletovsko Ezero/Knezevo, Mantovo and Mavrovica.

The source of the river is located in the forests of the Maleševo Mountains, close to the border of Bulgaria, east of the city of Pehchevo, in an altitude of around 1690 m a.s.l. The Bregalnica River leads into the Vardar river on an altitude of 137 m a.s.l., close to the village of Gradsko.

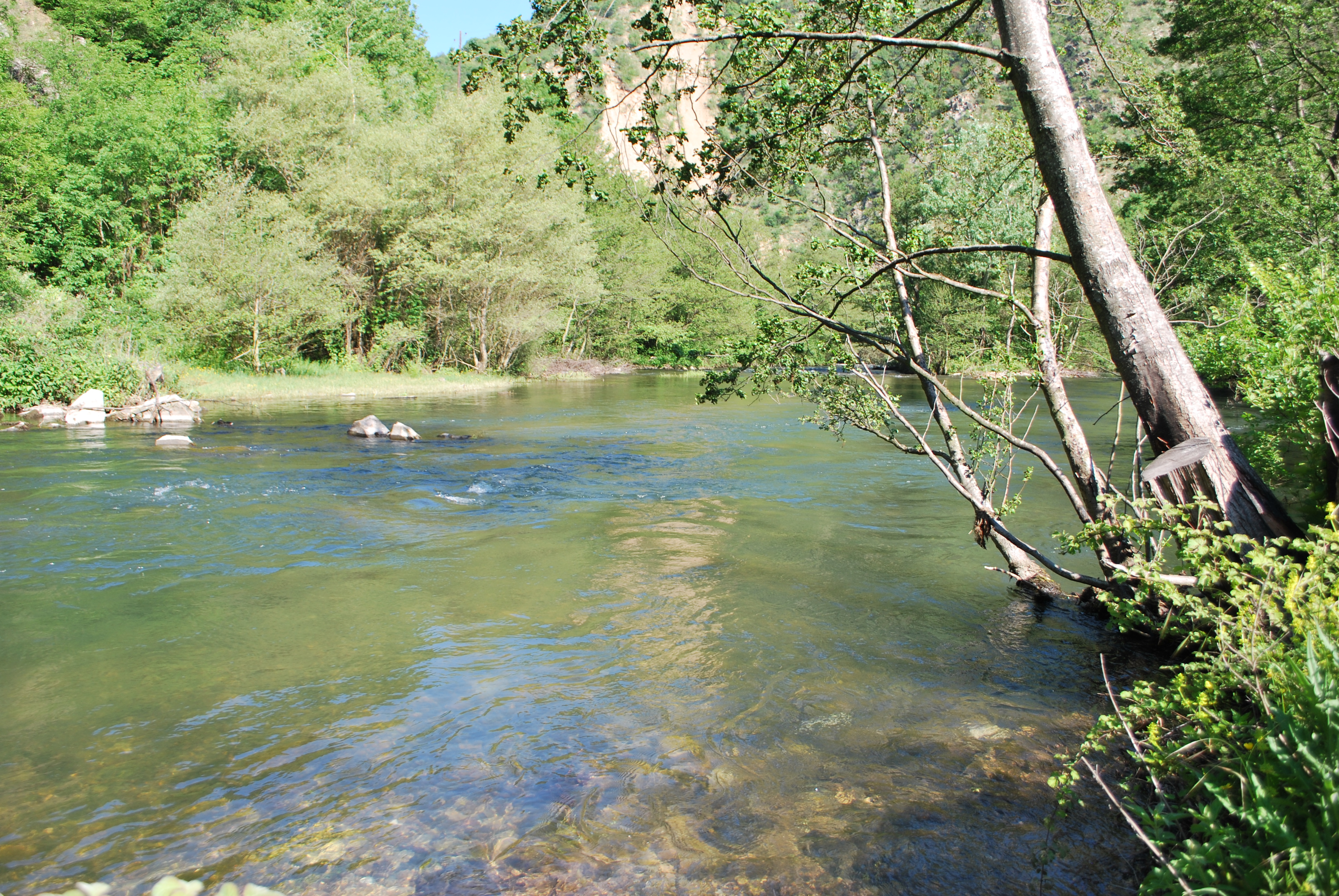
River Bregalnica close to Vinica

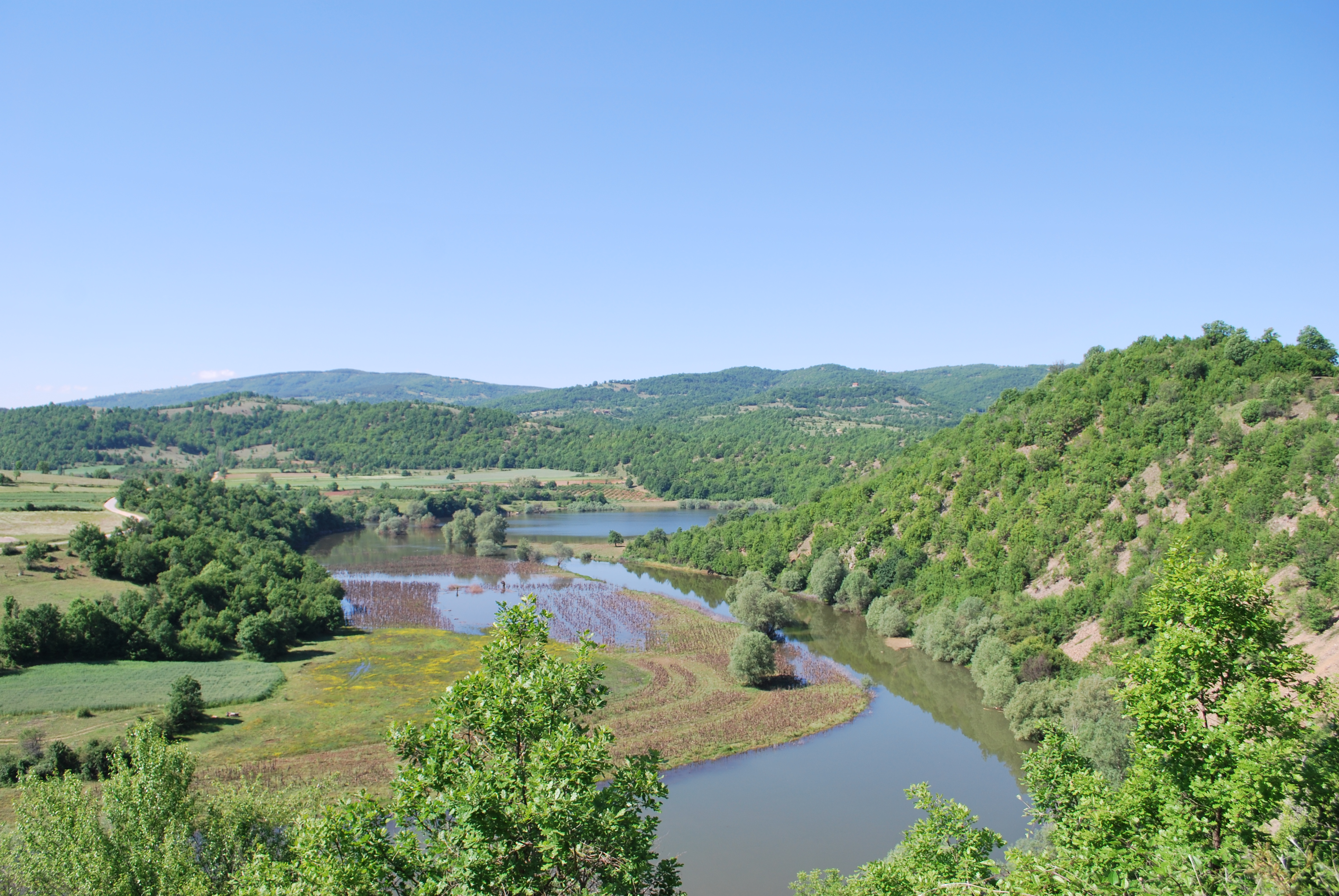
Bregalnica River near the village of Todorovci, close to Lake Kalimanci

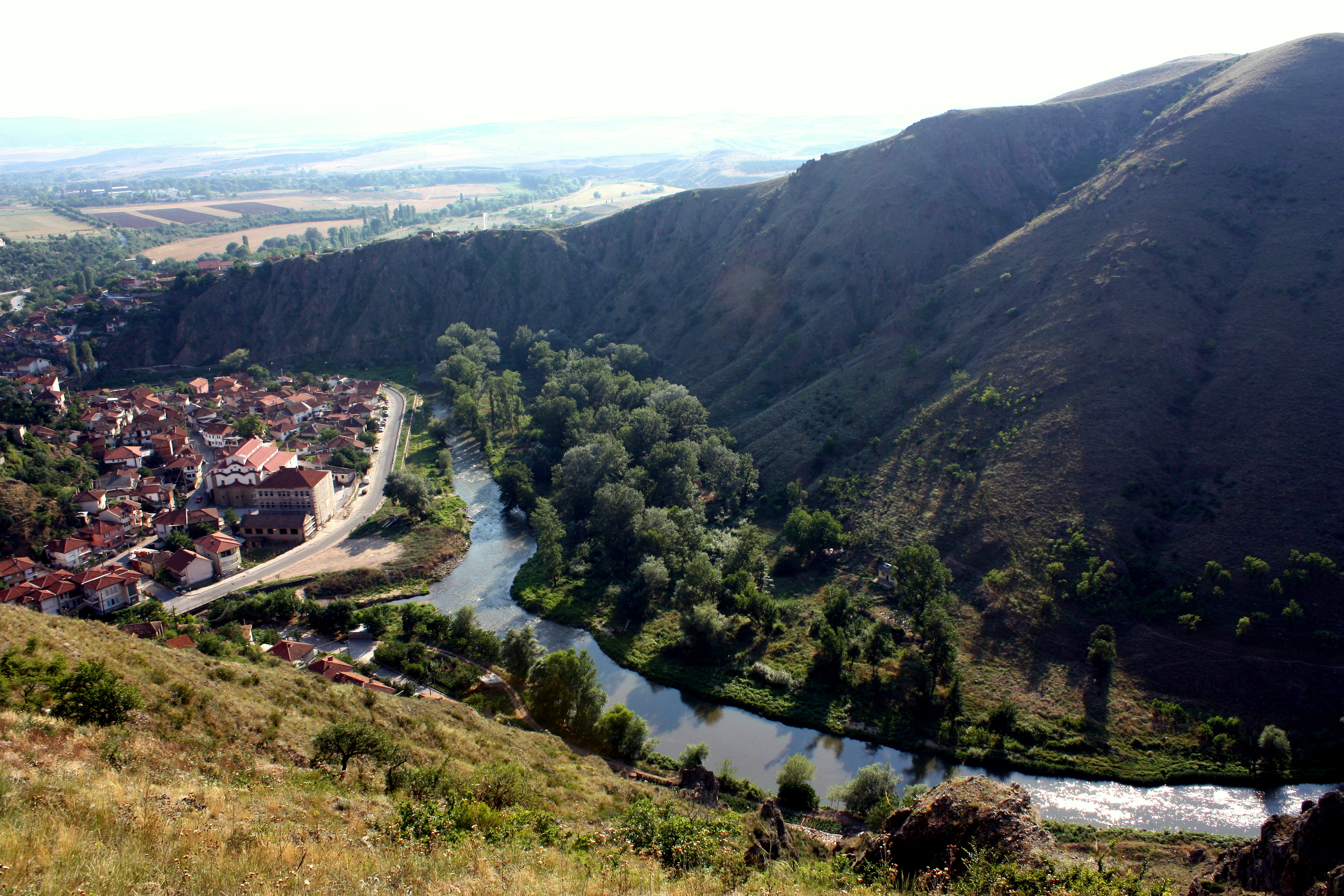
Bregalnica and Novo Selo Village

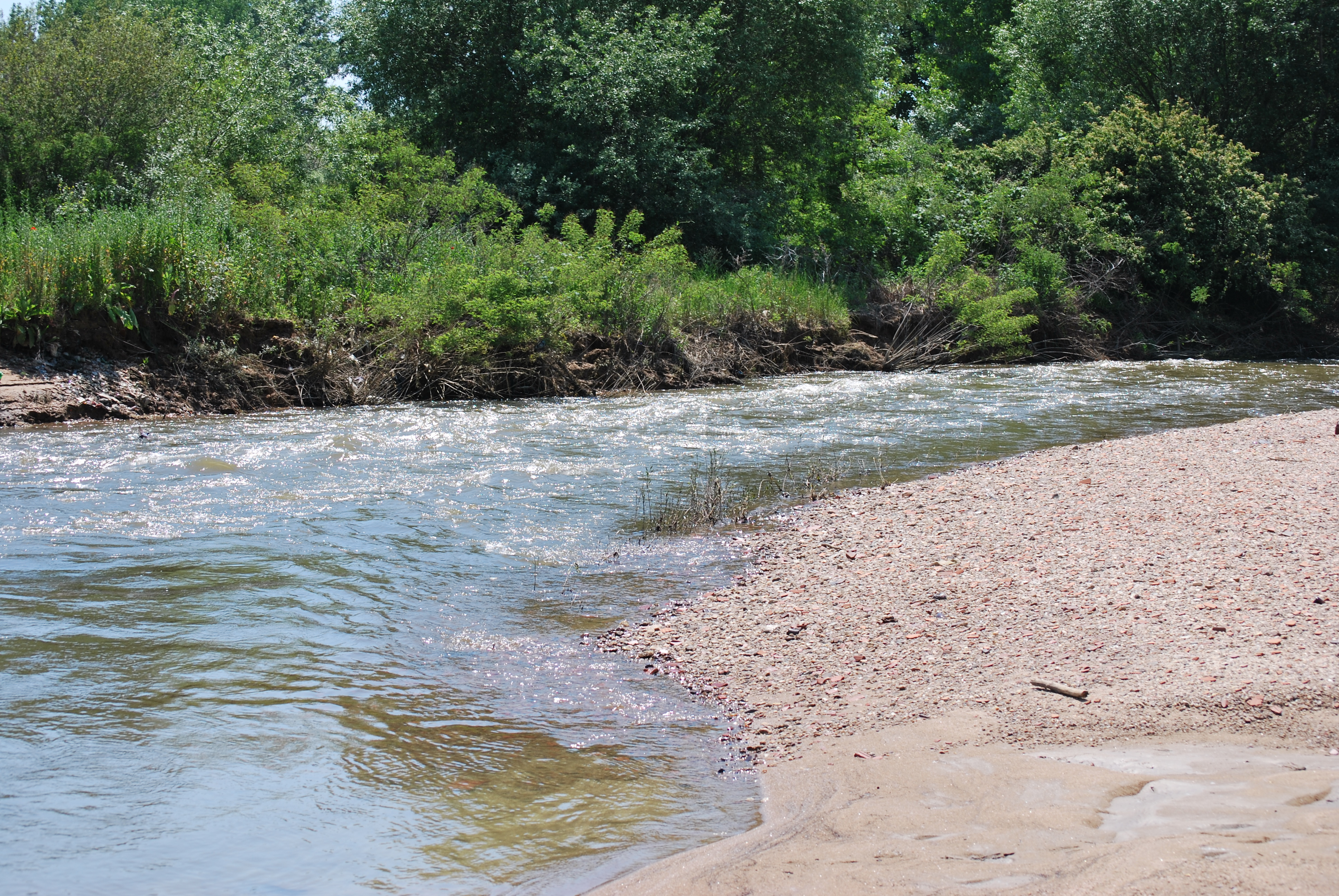
Bregalnica close to Kočani and Zrnovci

== Pollution ==
The main source of pollution in the Bregalnica river basin (Bregalnica, Zletovska, and Kriva rivers) based on data collected in 2012 is waste water discharges, both from industries and households. Some of the industries have wastewater treatment plants. However, much urban waste water are released untreated. Although there are seven urban waste water treatment plants in the whole river basin, only one is operational.

Most of the urban waste water discharges occur into small streams with low flow and consequently, low capacity for self-cleansing. There are several mid-size industrial enterprises performing different activities: pig and poultry farming, food processing, metal processing and finishing, production and finishing of textiles, construction and wood industries, production of ceramics and production of chemicals. A minor point-source pressure is fish farming. From these industrial activities, metal processing and leather and textile industries are major sources of pollutants. Several mines exist with direct waste water discharges to water courses, containing such heavy metals from active lead and zinc mines in Zletovo and Toranica.

The pressures associated with diffuse pollution are important throughout the basin due to the high density of both agricultural lands and livestock farming occurring in certain areas in the basin. Livestock farming includes pig farms and poultry, with the dung spread directly to the land. Another main issue concerning diffuse pollution is the existence of several mines throughout the basin. Although some of them have direct discharges in water courses, the metals contained in the soils extracted can also reach surface waters through runoff. Finally, the disposal of solid wastes and wastes from agricultural activity in the river banks is another pressure that significantly contributes to the organic pollution of the water.

== The Bregalnica River Basin Management Project ==
=== Macedonian Water Law ===
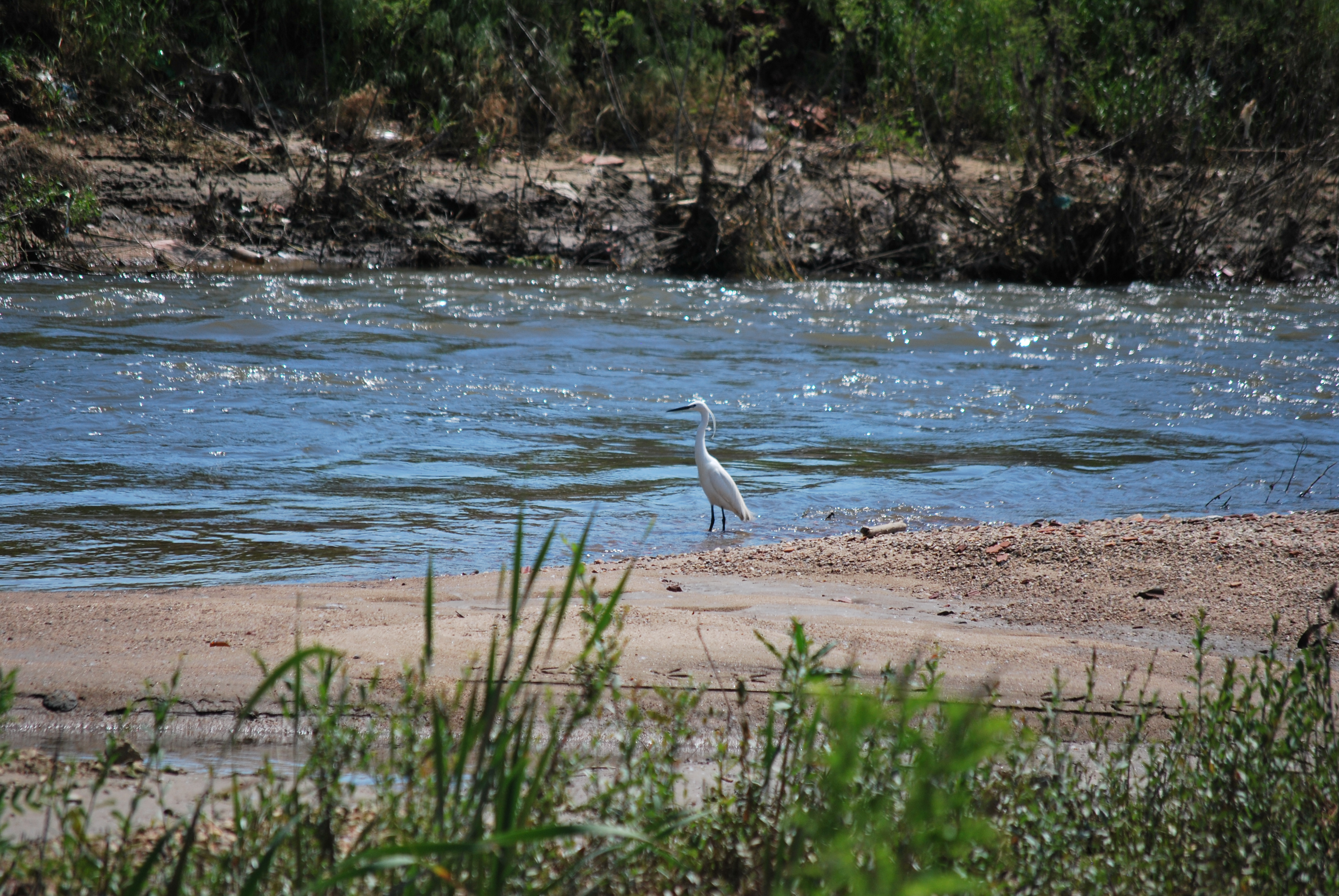
The river Bregalnica in Zrnovci

In 2004, Macedonia submitted an application to become EU member. To prepare EU membership, North Macedonia has to implement EU compatible legislations. An important step towards this target was done in 2008 with the approval of the new Macedonian Water Law, which introduces the River Basin Management (RBM) approach in line with the EU Water Framework Directive (WFD). To bring forward the implementation of the new Macedonian Water Law and the RBM approach, the Ministry of Environment and Physical Planning (MOEPP) and the Ministry of Agriculture, Forestry and Water Economy (MAFWE) started in 2012 a collaboration with the Swiss State Secretariat for Economic Affairs (SECO).

=== Actors ===
MOEPP, MAFWE and SECO selected the Bregalnica river basin as pilot region to apply the RBM approach. The project started in July 2012 and is co-financed by SECO, MOEPP, MAFWE, and the municipalities of the Bregalnica region. The project is carried out by a team of national and international experts, supported by a steering committee, a Bregalnica RBM Advisory Council, and a Bregalnica Basin Planning Group. The latter comes in the form of several rounds of sub-regional workshops, each time carried out in three sub-regions (i.e. Upper Bregalnica, Middle Bregalnica and Lower Bregalnica).

=== Objectives ===
The main objective of the project is the sustainable management of the water resources in the Bregalnica river basin, by this promoting the economic development of the region, stimulating industry, agriculture and tourism. The enforcement of the Macedonian water law through the project should bring about the improvement of the water and sanitation services in the Bregalnica River Basin. The project is divided into the following two components:

- The Bregalnica River Basin Management (RBM) Plan, comprising the analysis of the current and future situation of the water resources and demand in the Bregalnica region, the identification of possible conflicts and the identification of improvement measurements. Additionally it comprehends the definition and putting into operation of the necessary organizational structures.
- The Small Water Infrastructure (SWI) Projects, comprising the establishment and operation of an investment fund to provide financing for small water infrastructure projects, including support to the municipalities of the Bregalnica river basin in the planning, tender de-sign, contracting and implementation of the projects.

== See also ==
- North Macedonia
