= Cera =

Cera or CERA may refer to:

== People ==
- Jack Cera (1955 or 1956–2025), American politician from Ohio
- Michael Cera (born 1988), Canadian actor
- Pierluigi Cera (born 1941), Italian footballer
- Cera (The Land Before Time), a character from The Land Before Time animated film series

== Places ==
- Cera, Croatia, a village
- Cera, Makedonska Kamenica, North Macedonia, a village

== Other ==
- Cambridge Energy Research Associates, a consulting firm
- CeraVe, dermatology and skin care company
- Canterbury Earthquake Recovery Authority, a New Zealand public service department coordinating the rebuild of Christchurch after the 2011 earthquake
- Catcher's ERA, a baseball statistic
- Central Railroad of Indianapolis
- cera, Latin [pharmacy, cosmetics] wax (as ingredient)
- Chartered Enterprise Risk Analyst, a designation awarded by the Society of Actuaries
- Chinese Empire Reform Association, a reformist political party in the late-Qing Dynasty
- Conard Environmental Research Area, a prairie research area affiliated with Grinnell College, near Kellogg, Iowa
- Continuous erythropoietin receptor activator, a class of drugs and a variant of erythropoietin (EPO)
- Cortical evoked response audiometry, an assessment using auditory evoked potentials
- Conservation and Environmental Research Areas of UMBC, protected environmental areas on the University of Maryland, Baltimore County campus
- Cera dynasty, an Indian dynasty that ruled over parts of southern India
- Cyprus Energy Regulatory Authority (CERA), energy regulatory authority of Republic of Cyprus
