= Lakavica =

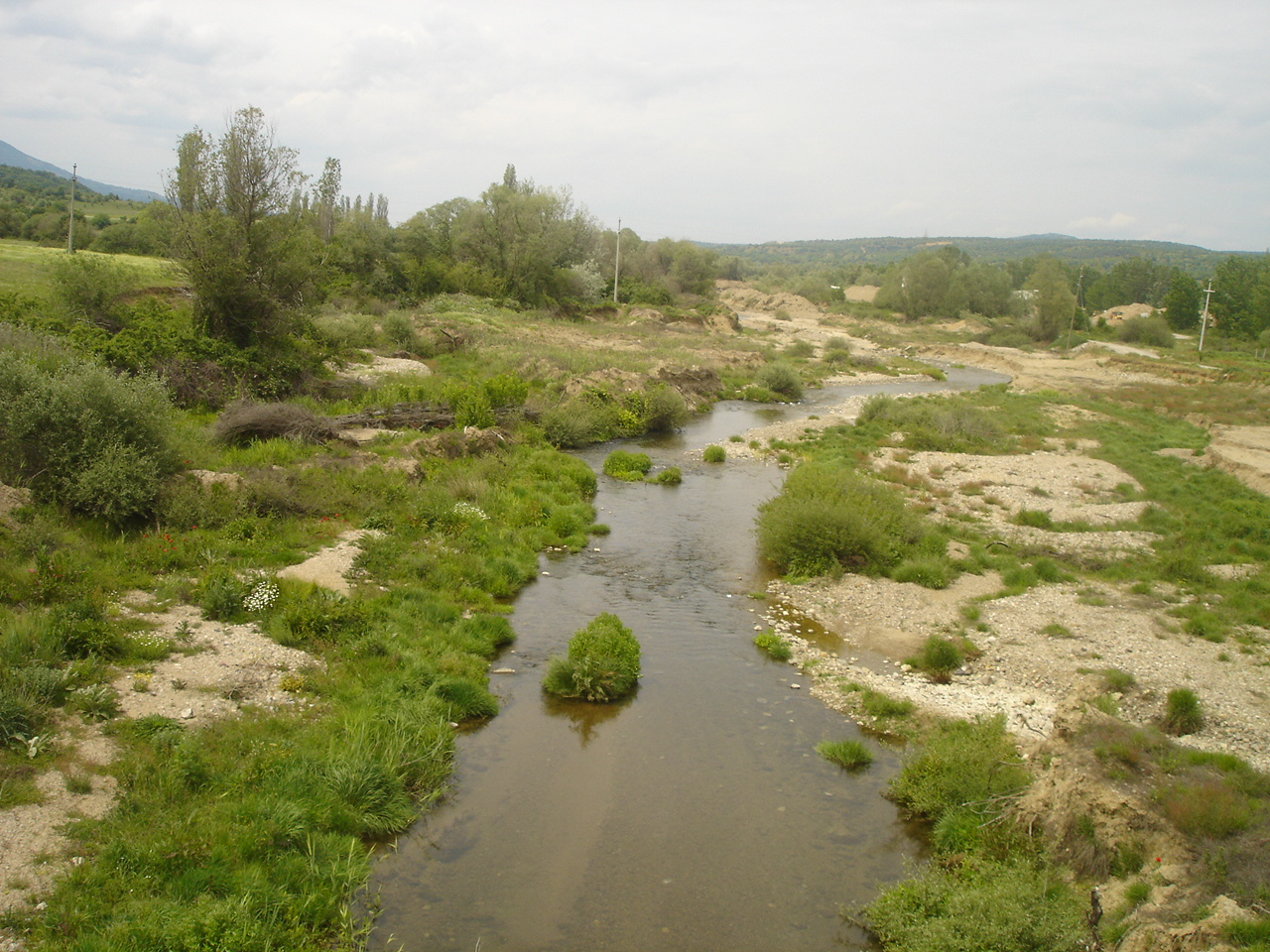

Location
- Country: Republic of North Macedonia

Physical characteristics
- Mouth
  - location: Bregalnica
  - coordinates: 41.7043°N 22.1455°E

Basin features
- Progression: Bregalnica→ Vardar→ Aegean Sea

Lakavica, or Kriva Lakavica (Macedonian: Лакавица or Крива Лакавица), is a river in the east-central part of the Republic of North Macedonia, in Štip and Konče municipalities. It is a left tributary of the Bregalnica River, the second largest river in country. The Lakavica Valley is very fertile and dotted with many villages and farms.

== Description ==
Kriva Lakavica flows down from the northern slopes of the Gradeska mountain range at an altitude of 570 m, from the village Sofilari, at a height of 251 m. It is 42 km long with a southeastern current, ending south of the village of Dolni Lipovikj. The river moves in a south-southeast direction with a total drop of 319 m and an average decline of 7.6‰ covering a total area of 425 km^{2}. Lake Mantovo was constructed out of the upper portion of the lake in 1978. In terms of water flows, there are characteristic torrents: through summer it dries up, and in the case of torrential rains, the water level increases up to 2 meters, with the water pouring from the riverbed, causing huge damage to the surrounding arable land. This flash flooding resulted in a child's death in 2014.

== Environment ==
=== Important Bird Area ===
A 5,730 ha tract of land encompassing the Lakavica River and Lake Mantovo has been designated an Important Bird Area (IBA) by BirdLife International because it supports populations of European rollers and masked shrikes.
