= Ivan Sunara =

Croatian basketball player (born 1959)

Personal information
- Born: 27 March 1959 (age 67) Cera, PR Croatia, FPR Yugoslavia

Career information
- Playing career: 1975–1994
- Position: Forward
- Coaching career: 1997–present

Career history

Playing
- 1975–1977: Jugoplastika
- 1977–1979: Maribor
- 1979–1987: Zadar
- 1987–1989: Cibona
- 1989–1990: Paini Napoli
- 1990–1992: Cibona
- 1992–1994: Maricom/TAM Bus Miklavž

Coaching
- 1994–1995: Dona Zagreb (assistant)
- 1995–1997: Cibona (assistant)
- 1997–1998: Maribor Ovni/ZM Lumar
- 1999–2000: Krka
- 2000–2002: Zrinjevac Zagreb
- 2002–2004: Slovan Ljubljana
- 2004: Slovenia U20
- 2004: Široki
- 2004–2005: Zagreb
- 2005–2006: Skyliners Frankfurt
- 2007–2008: Cibona
- 2008–2009: Krka
- 2010: Helios Domžale
- 2010: Perlas Vilnius
- 2011–2012: Zlatorog Laško
- 2012–2013: Croatia (assistant)
- 2014: KK Zadar

Career highlights
- As a player: Yugoslav League (1977); 2x Yugoslav Cup (1977, 1988); FIBA Korać Cup (1977); Croatian League champion (1992); As a head coach: Slovenian League champion (2000); European U20 champion (2004)
Medals
Men's basketball
Representing Yugoslavia
Olympic Games
Bronze medal – third place	1984 Los Angeles	Team competition
Mediterranean Games
Gold medal – first place	1983 Casablanca	Team competition
Summer Universiade
Silver medal – second place	1983 Edmonton	Team competition
Bronze medal – third place	1981 Bucharest	Team competition
European Championship for Juniors
Bronze medal – third place	1978 Italy	Team

Ivan Sunara (born 27 March 1959) is a Croatian former basketball player and coach who competed for Yugoslavia in the 1984 Summer Olympics.
