= Moštica =

Moštica Моштица
- Village
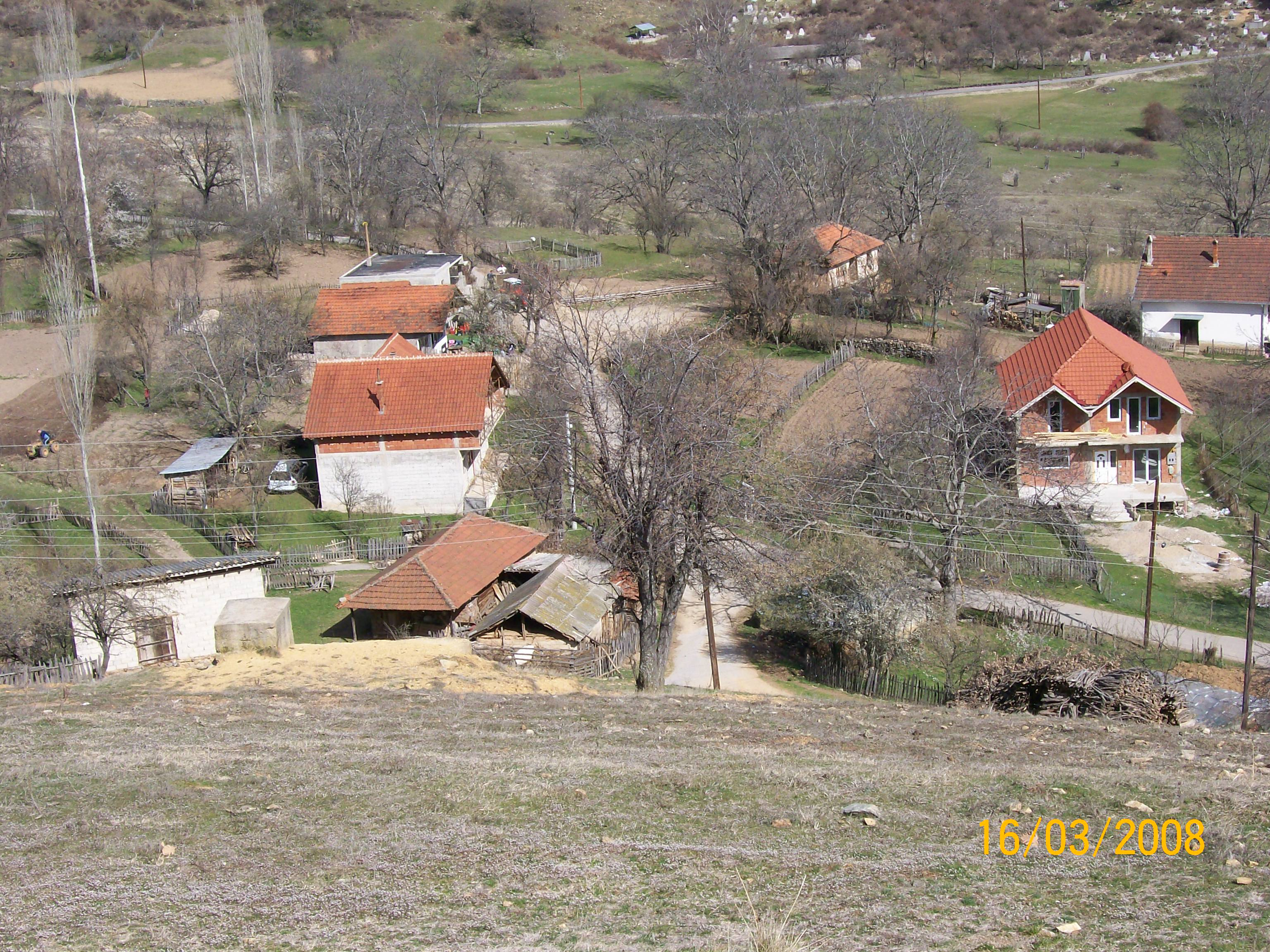

- Location within North Macedonia
- Coordinates: 42.059472°N 22.580728°E
- Country: North Macedonia
- Region: Eastern
- Municipality: Makedonska Kamenica

Population (2002)
  - Total: 543
- Time zone: UTC+1 (CET)
  - Summer (DST): UTC+2 (CEST)
- Website: .

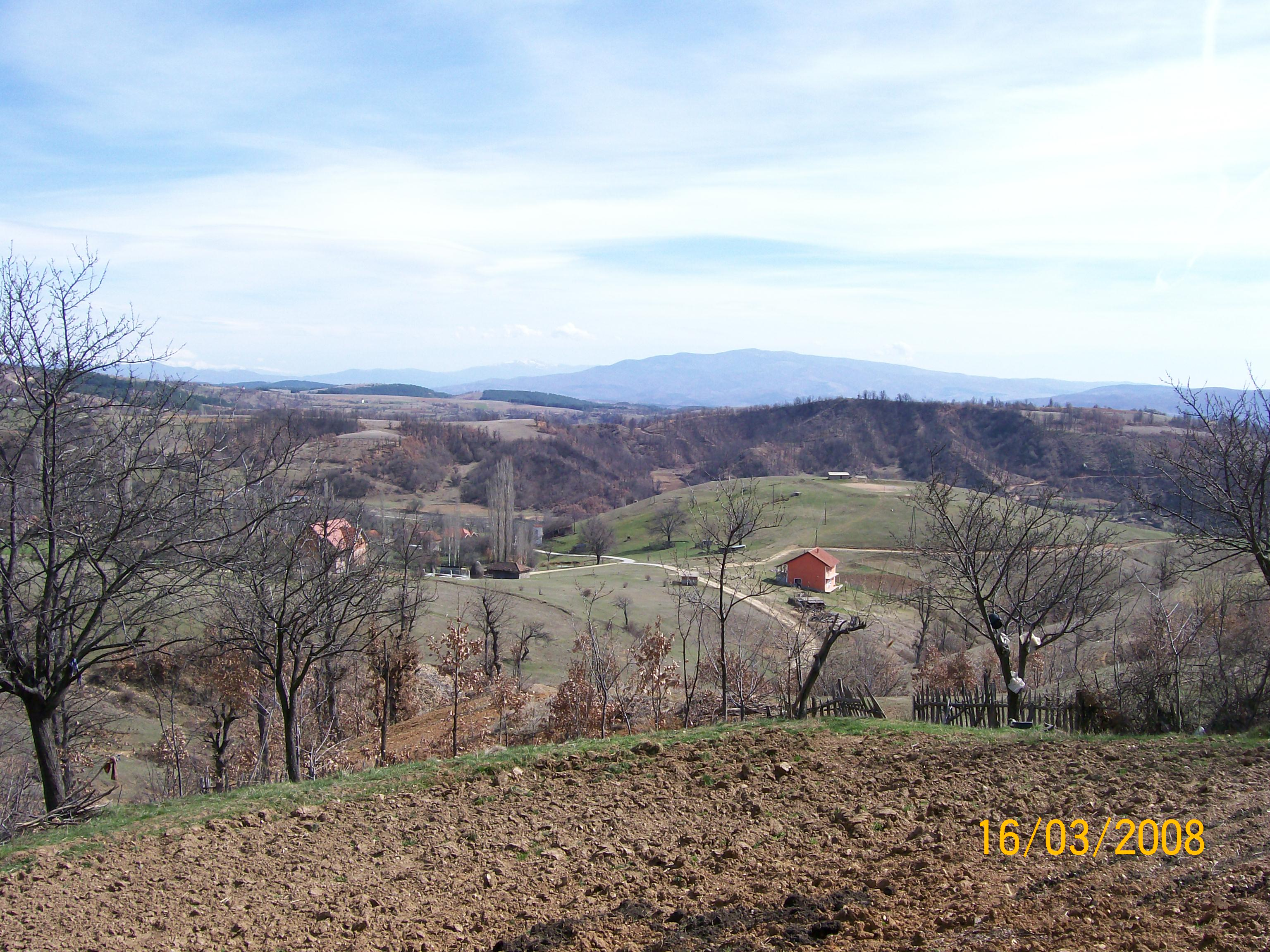

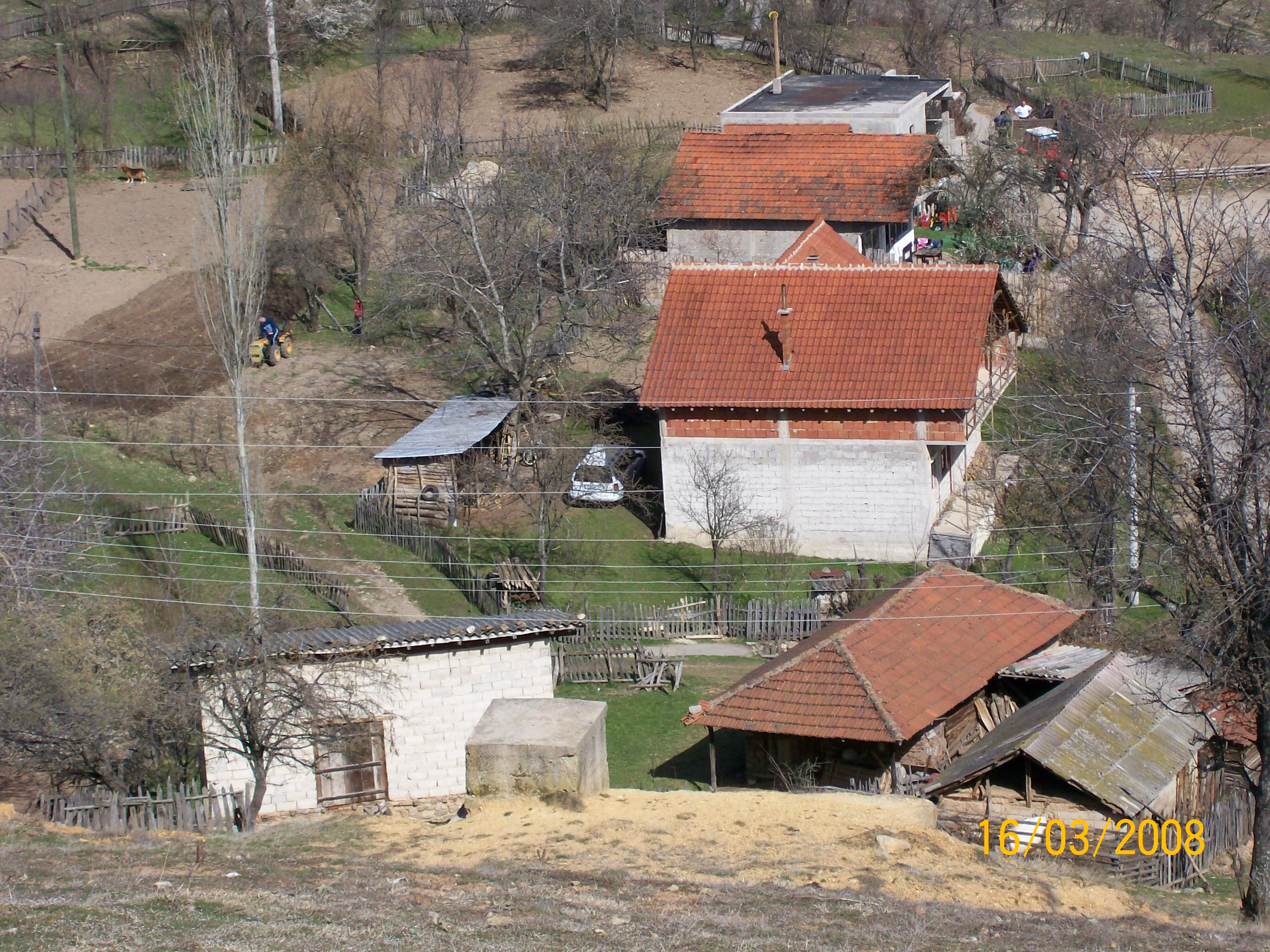

Moštica (Macedonian: Моштица) is a village in the municipality of Makedonska Kamenica, North Macedonia.

== Demographics ==
According to the 2002 census, the village had a total of 543 inhabitants. Ethnic groups in the village include:

- Macedonians 543
