= Lukovica, Makedonska Kamenica =

Lukovica Луковица
- Village
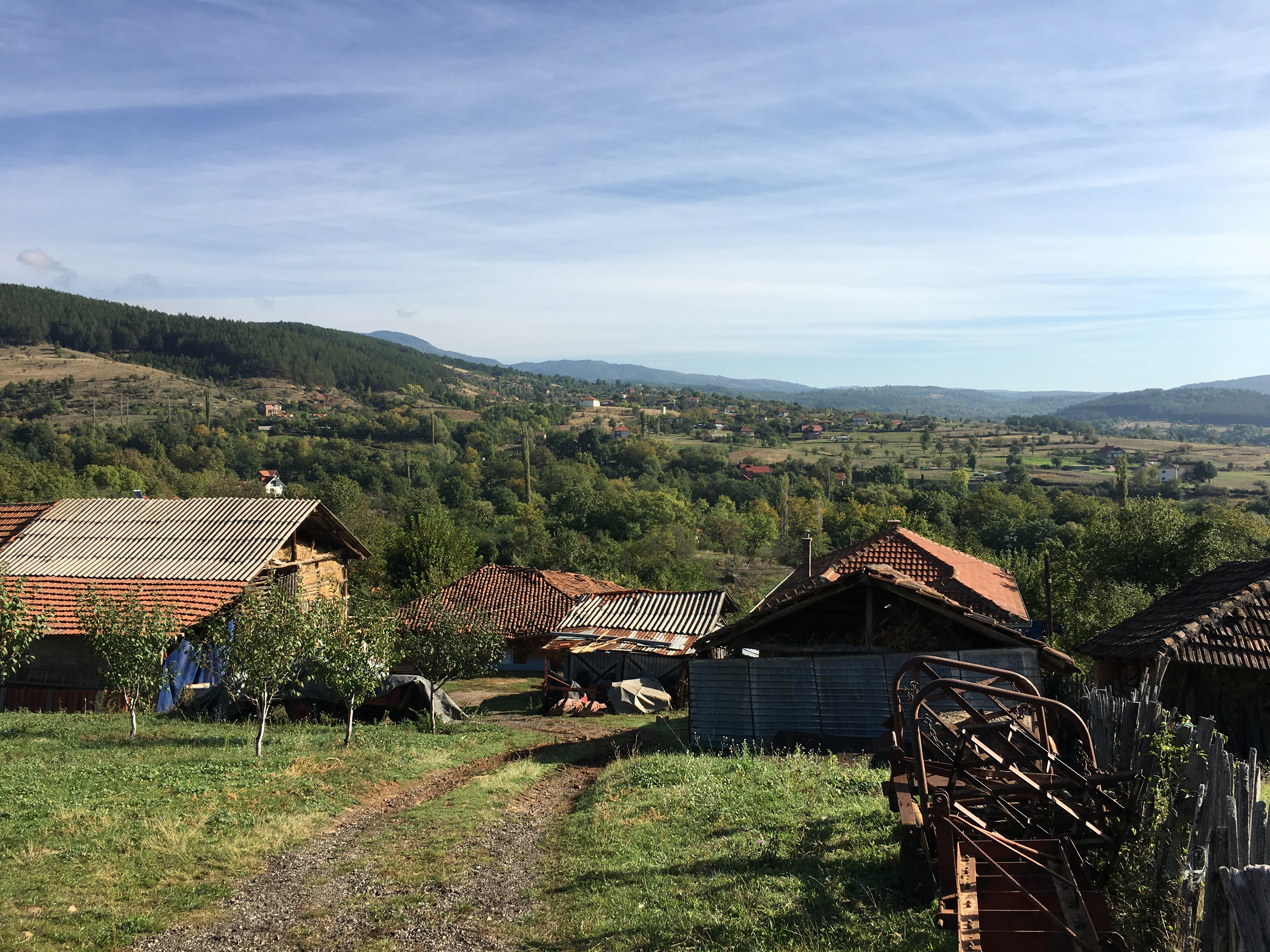

- Location within North Macedonia
- Coordinates: 42.014617°N 22.606542°E
- Country: North Macedonia
- Region: Eastern
- Municipality: Makedonska Kamenica

Population (2021)
  - Total: 297
- Time zone: UTC+1 (CET)
  - Summer (DST): UTC+2 (CEST)
- Website: .

Lukovica (Macedonian: Луковица) is a village in the municipality of Makedonska Kamenica, North Macedonia.

== Demographics ==
As of the 2021 census, Lukovica had 297 residents with the following ethnic composition:

- Macedonians 279
- Persons for whom data are taken from administrative sources 13
- Others 5

According to the 2002 census, the village had a total of 269 inhabitants. Ethnic groups in the village include:

- Macedonians 269
