= Kosevica =

Kosevica Косевица
- Village
- Location within North Macedonia
- Coordinates: 42.040908°N 22.612886°E
- Country: North Macedonia
- Region: Eastern
- Municipality: Makedonska Kamenica

Population (2002)
  - Total: 240
- Time zone: UTC+1 (CET)
  - Summer (DST): UTC+2 (CEST)
- Website: .

Kosevica (Macedonian: Косевица) is a village in the municipality of Makedonska Kamenica, North Macedonia.

== Demographics ==
According to the 2002 census, the village had a total of 240 inhabitants. Ethnic groups in the village include:

- Macedonians 238
- Serbs 2
