= Gabrevci =

Gabrevci Габревци
- Village
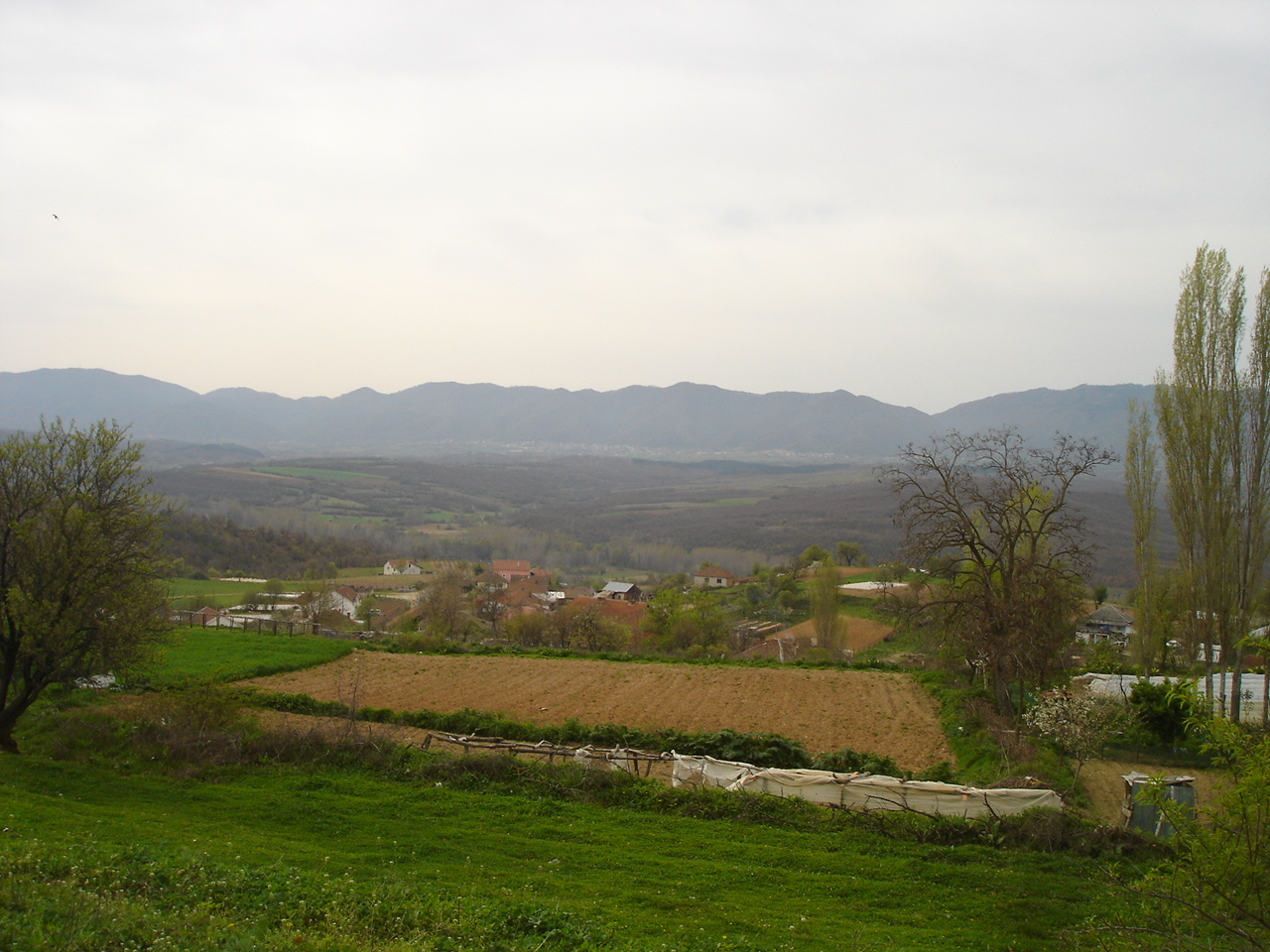

- Location within North Macedonia
- Coordinates: 41.564480°N 22.379395°E
- Country: North Macedonia
- Region: Southeastern
- Municipality: Konče

Population (2021)
  - Total: 220
- Time zone: UTC+1 (CET)
  - Summer (DST): UTC+2 (CEST)

Gabrevci (Macedonian: Габревци) is a village in the municipality of Konče, North Macedonia.

== Demographics ==
According to the 2002 census, the village had a total of 355 inhabitants. Ethnic groups in the village include:

- Macedonians 355

As of 2021, the village of Gabrevci has 220 inhabitants and the ethnic composition was the following:

- Macedonians – 190
- Person without Data - 30
