= Otinja =

River in North Macedonia, tributary of the Bregalnica

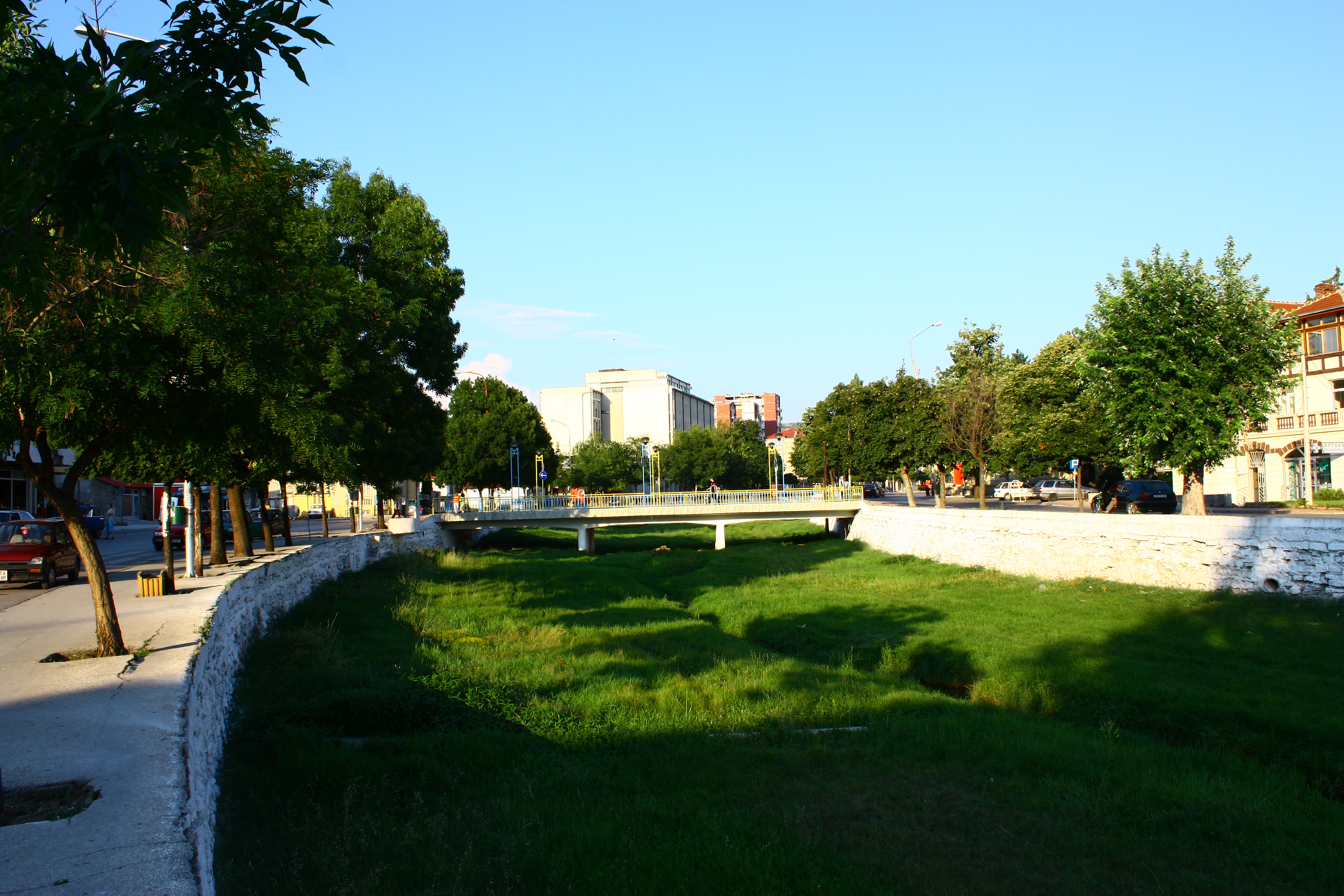

Location
- Country: North Macedonia

Physical characteristics
- Mouth
  - location: Bregalnica
  - coordinates: 41.7370°N 22.1829°E

Basin features
- Progression: Bregalnica→ Vardar→ Aegean Sea

Otinja (Macedonian: Отиња) is a river that bisects the city of Štip, North Macedonia and is a tributary to the Bregalnica river. The river is of medium length, but the last part that flows through the city often dries up in the summer months as the water is blocked upstream for irrigation of the farms and vegetable gardens north of the city. The last 3 km of the river, that passes through the center of Štip, are bounded by a quay built of stone and mortar, which is criss-crossed by several bridges, including the medieval Stone Bridge of Štip (Macedonian: Камен Мост), and is an integral part of the Štip downtown.

A hydroelectric plant has been started on the upper reaches of the river, north of the city. Development has been stalled for decades. The former mayor of Štip, Pande Sarev, has in the past, met with the Dutch ambassador to North Macedonia to discuss possible Dutch investments in the completion of the HEC "Otinja" as well as other projects in the city.
