= Gorni Lipoviḱ =

Gorni Lipovikj / Gorni Lipoviḱ Горни Липовиќ
- Village
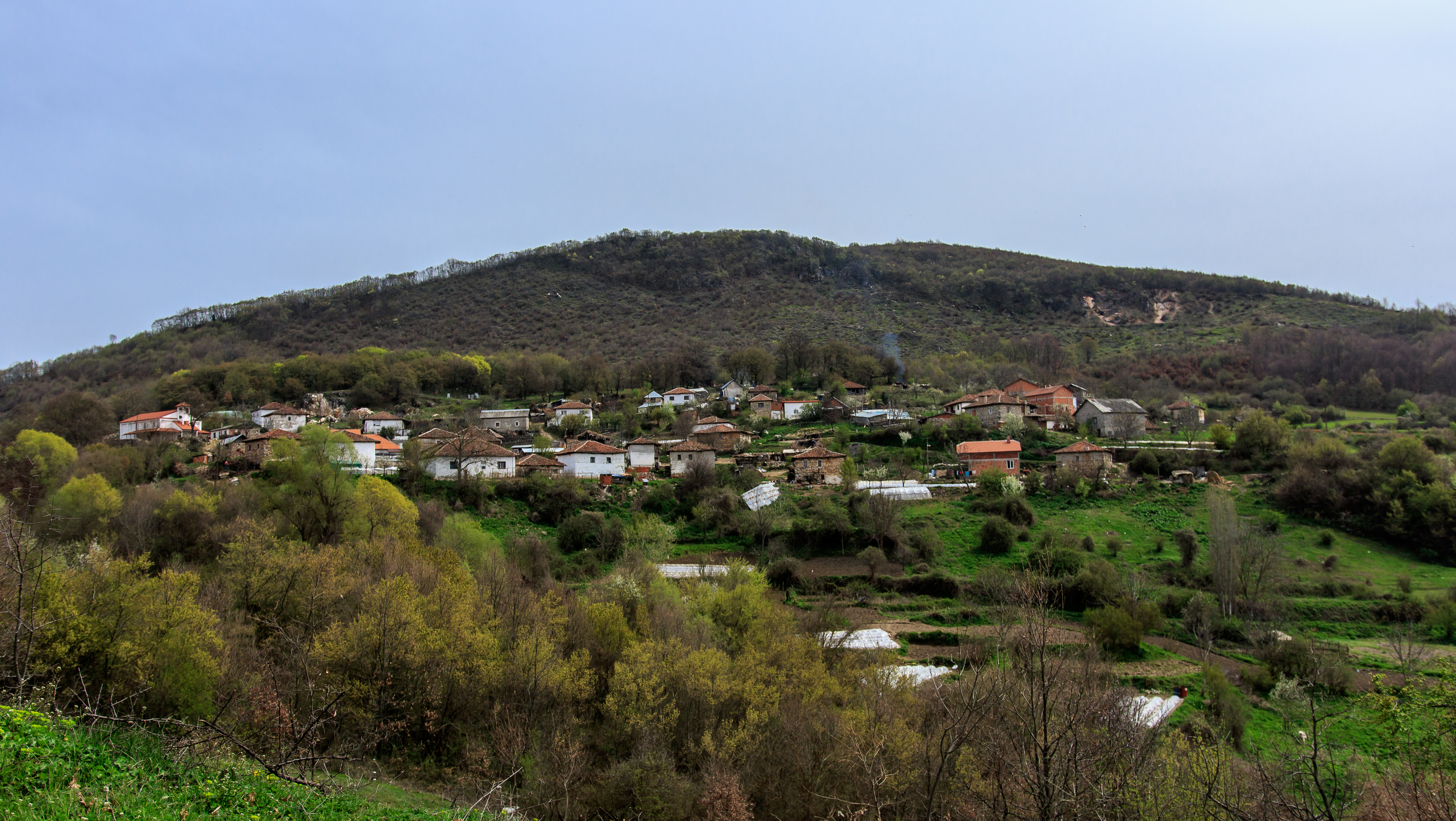

- Location within North Macedonia
- Country: North Macedonia
- Region: Southeastern
- Municipality: Konče
- Elevation: 843 m (2,766 ft)

Population (2021)
  - Total: 119
- Time zone: UTC+1 (CET)
- Area code: +38932

Gorni Lipovikj (Macedonian: Горни Липовиќ) is a village in the municipality of Konče, North Macedonia.

== Demographics ==
The population in 1900 was 420. The population in 1905 was 548.

According to the 2002 census, the village had a total of 163 inhabitants. Ethnic groups in the village include:

- Macedonians 162
- Serbs 1

As of 2021, the village of Gorni Lipovikj has 119 inhabitants and the ethnic composition was the following:

- Macedonians – 105
- Person without Data - 14
