= Dulica =

Dulica Дулица
- Village
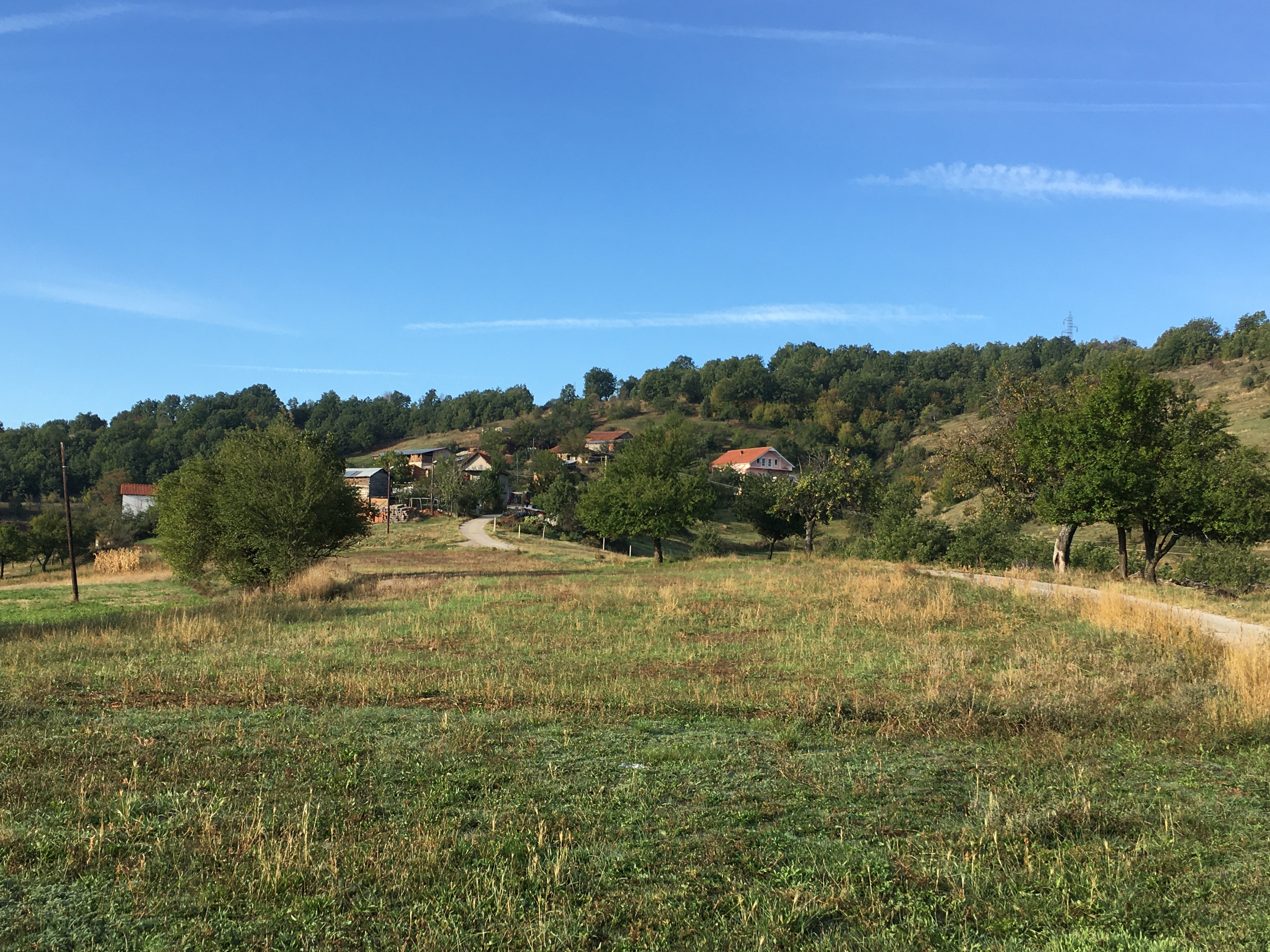
- View of the village

- Location within North Macedonia
- Coordinates: 41.995576°N 22.576909°E
- Country: North Macedonia
- Region: Eastern
- Municipality: Makedonska Kamenica

Population (2002)
  - Total: 305
- Time zone: UTC+1 (CET)
  - Summer (DST): UTC+2 (CEST)
- Website: .

Dulica (Macedonian: Дулица) is a village in the municipality of Makedonska Kamenica, North Macedonia.

== Demographics ==
According to the 2002 census, the village had a total of 305 inhabitants. Ethnic groups in the village include:

- Macedonians 305
