= Kostin Dol =

Kostin Dol Костин Дол
- Village
- Location within North Macedonia
- Coordinates: 42.053056°N 22.646667°E
- Country: North Macedonia
- Region: Eastern
- Municipality: Makedonska Kamenica

Population (2002)
  - Total: 116
- Time zone: UTC+1 (CET)
  - Summer (DST): UTC+2 (CEST)
- Website: .

Kostin Dol (Macedonian: Костин Дол) is a village in the municipality of Makedonska Kamenica, North Macedonia.

== Demographics ==
According to the 2002 census, the village had a total of 116 inhabitants. Ethnic groups in the village include:

- Macedonians 116
