= Unešić =

- Village
- Interactive map of Unešić
- Location within Croatia
- Coordinates: 43°44′N 16°11′E
- Country: Croatia
- Region: Dalmatia
- County: Šibenik-Knin County

Government
  - Mayor: Marko Parat (HDZ)

Area
  - Village: 188.9 km^{2} (72.9 sq mi)
  - Urban: 16.4 km^{2} (6.3 sq mi)

Population (2021)
  - Village: 1,269
  - Density: 6.718/km^{2} (17.40/sq mi)
  - Urban: 265
  - Urban density: 16.2/km^{2} (41.9/sq mi)
- Time zone: UTC+1 (CET)
  - Summer (DST): UTC+2 (CEST)
- Postal code: 22323 Unešić
- Website: unesic.hr

Unešić is a village and a municipality in Šibenik-Knin County, Croatia.

== Population ==
In 2021, the municipality had 1,269 residents in the following 16 settlements:

- Cera, population 25
- Čvrljevo, population 42
- Donje Planjane, population 37
- Donje Utore, population 7
- Donje Vinovo, population 52
- Gornje Planjane, population 111
- Gornje Utore, population 52
- Gornje Vinovo, population 16
- Koprno, population 88
- Ljubostinje, population 40
- Mirlović Zagora, population 347
- Nevest, population 56
- Ostrogašica, population 38
- Podumci, population 68
- Unešić, population 265
- Visoka, population 25
Unešić: Population trends 1857–2021
v

population	4011	4331	4399	4386	4969	5049	4952	5741	6567	6833	7067	6907	4892	3507	2160	1686	1269
	1857	1869	1880	1890	1900	1910	1921	1931	1948	1953	1961	1971	1981	1991	2001	2011	2021

Sources: Croatian Bureau of Statistics publications

In the 2011 census, 99.70% people declared themselves Croats.

== Sports ==
Local football club NK Zagora Unešić plays in the third tier of the Croatian football pyramid.
