= Rakitec =

Rakitec Ракитец
- Village
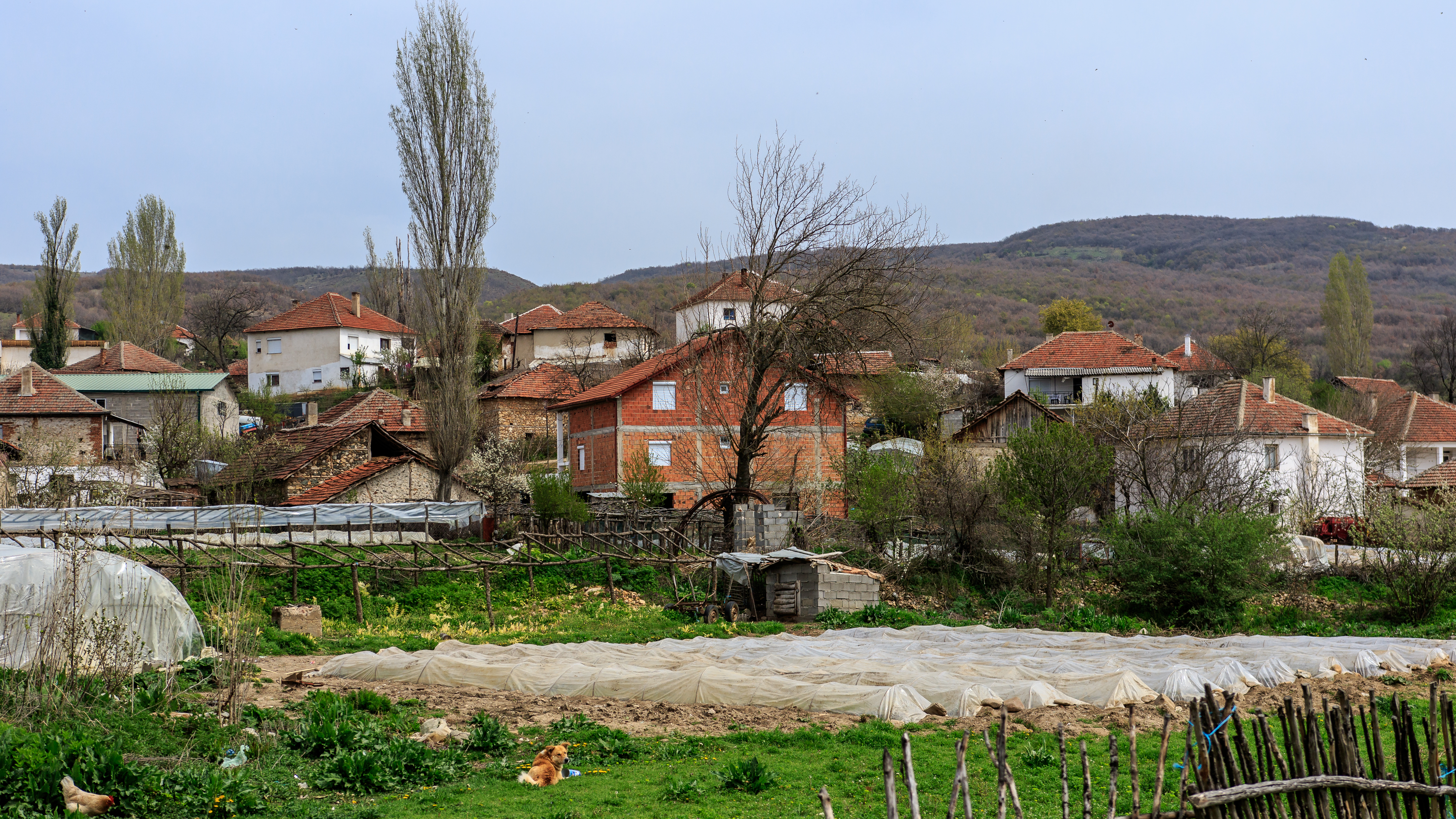

- Location within North Macedonia
- Coordinates: 41.543639°N 22.424418°E
- Country: North Macedonia
- Region: Southeastern
- Municipality: Konče

Population (2022)
  - Total: 355
- Time zone: UTC+1 (CET)
  - Summer (DST): UTC+2 (CEST)
- Website: .

Rakitec (Macedonian: Ракитец) is a village in the municipality of Konče, North Macedonia.

== Demographics ==
According to the 2002 census, the village had a total of 519 inhabitants. Ethnic groups in the village include:

- Macedonians 519

As of 2021, the village of Rakitec has 355 inhabitants and the ethnic composition was the following:

- Macedonians – 316
- Person without Data - 39
