= Dedino, North Macedonia =

Dedino Дедино
- Village
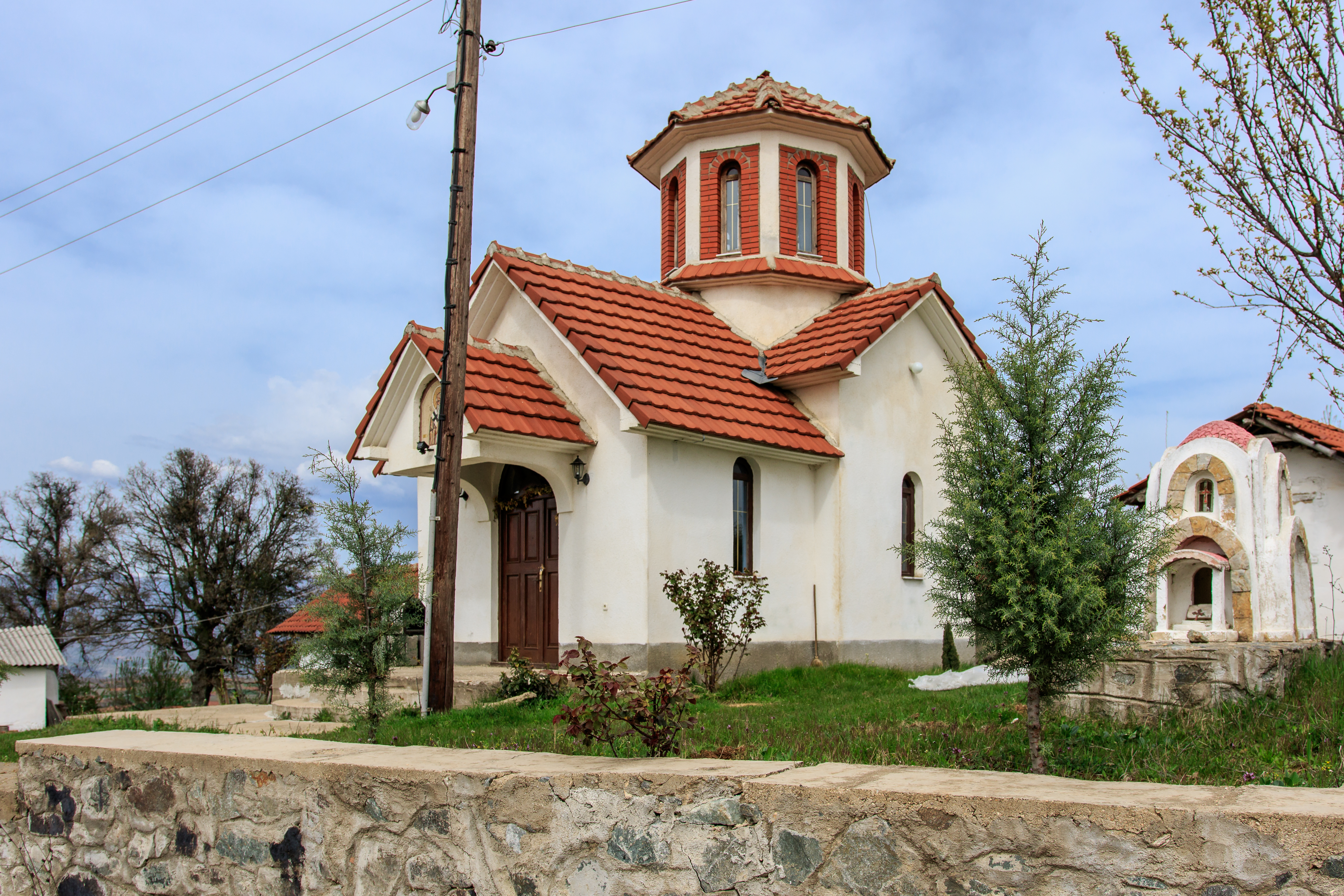
- St. Athanasius Church in the village Dedino

- Location within North Macedonia
- Coordinates: 41.569790°N 22.425004°E
- Country: North Macedonia
- Region: Southeastern
- Municipality: Konče

Population (2021)
  - Total: 498
- Time zone: UTC+1 (CET)
  - Summer (DST): UTC+2 (CEST)

Dedino (Macedonian: Дедино) is a village in the municipality of Konče, North Macedonia.

== Demographics ==
According to the 2002 census, the village had a total of 716 inhabitants. Ethnic groups in the village include:

- Macedonians 716

As of 2021, the village of Dedino has 498 inhabitants and the ethnic composition was the following:

- Macedonians – 457
- Person without Data - 41
