= Sasa, North Macedonia =

Village in northeastern North Macedonia

Sasa Саса
- Village
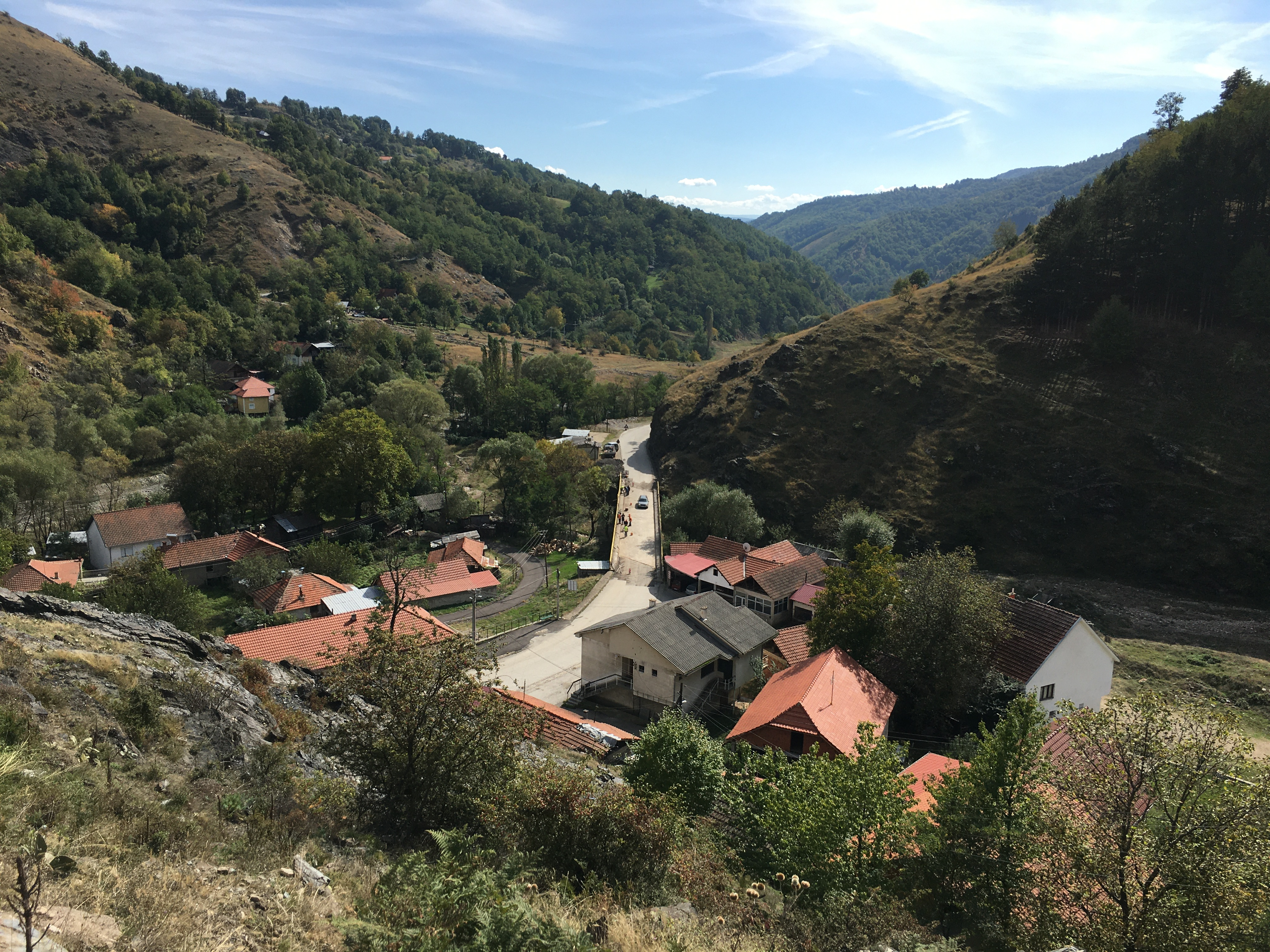
- View of Sasa

- Location within North Macedonia
- Coordinates: 42.077928°N 22.544934°E
- Country: North Macedonia
- Region: Eastern
- Municipality: Makedonska Kamenica
- Highest elevation: 1,340 m (4,400 ft)
- Lowest elevation: 700 m (2,300 ft)

Population (2021)
  - Total: 501
- Time zone: UTC+1 (CET)
  - Summer (DST): UTC+2 (CEST)

Sasa (Macedonian: Саса) is a rural village in the Makedonska Kamenica Municipality, North Macedonia. It has a population of 501.

== History ==
The village and surrounding mines were set up by Transylvanian Saxons, which settled on the Balkans in late Middle Ages. The name Sasa originates from the traditional South Slavic name Sasi for a Saxons.

Vasil Kanchov's 1900 survey recorded 700 Bulgarian Christians and 30 Roma in the village. Later in 1905, Secretary of the Bulgarian Exarchate Dimitar Mishev (writing as "Brancoff") documented 552 Exarchist Bulgarians and six Roma in the village, with one primary school, two teachers, and 46 students.

== Geography ==
The village is situated in the northern mountainous region of the Makedonska Kamenica Municipality, near the border with Bulgaria, at elevations ranging from 700 to 1,340 meters.

== Demographics ==
=== Ethnic groups ===
The historical ethnic makeup of this village is as follows:

Ethnicity	Year							
Ethnicity	1953	1961	1971	1981	1991	1994	2002	2021
Macedonians	1,222	1,193	1,607	1,381	1,031	1,190	874	418
Albanians	0	0	2	0	0	0	0	0
Turks	0	0	5	0	0	0	0	0
Roma	0	0	0	0	0	0	0	0
Aromanians	0	—	—	0	0	0	0	0
Serbs	1	4	37	1	1	0	2	0
Others	3	9	5	6	2	0	0	0
Total	1226	1206	1656	1388	1034	1190	876	501 (Note: There are four "not mentioned" and seven "persons for whom the data has been obtained from administrative sources".)

=== Sex ===
The historical population of both sexes in this village is as follows:

Sex	Year						
Sex	1953	1961	1971	1981	1991	1994	2002
Male	652	672	949	719	555	635	470
Female	574	534	707	669	479	555	406

== Economy ==
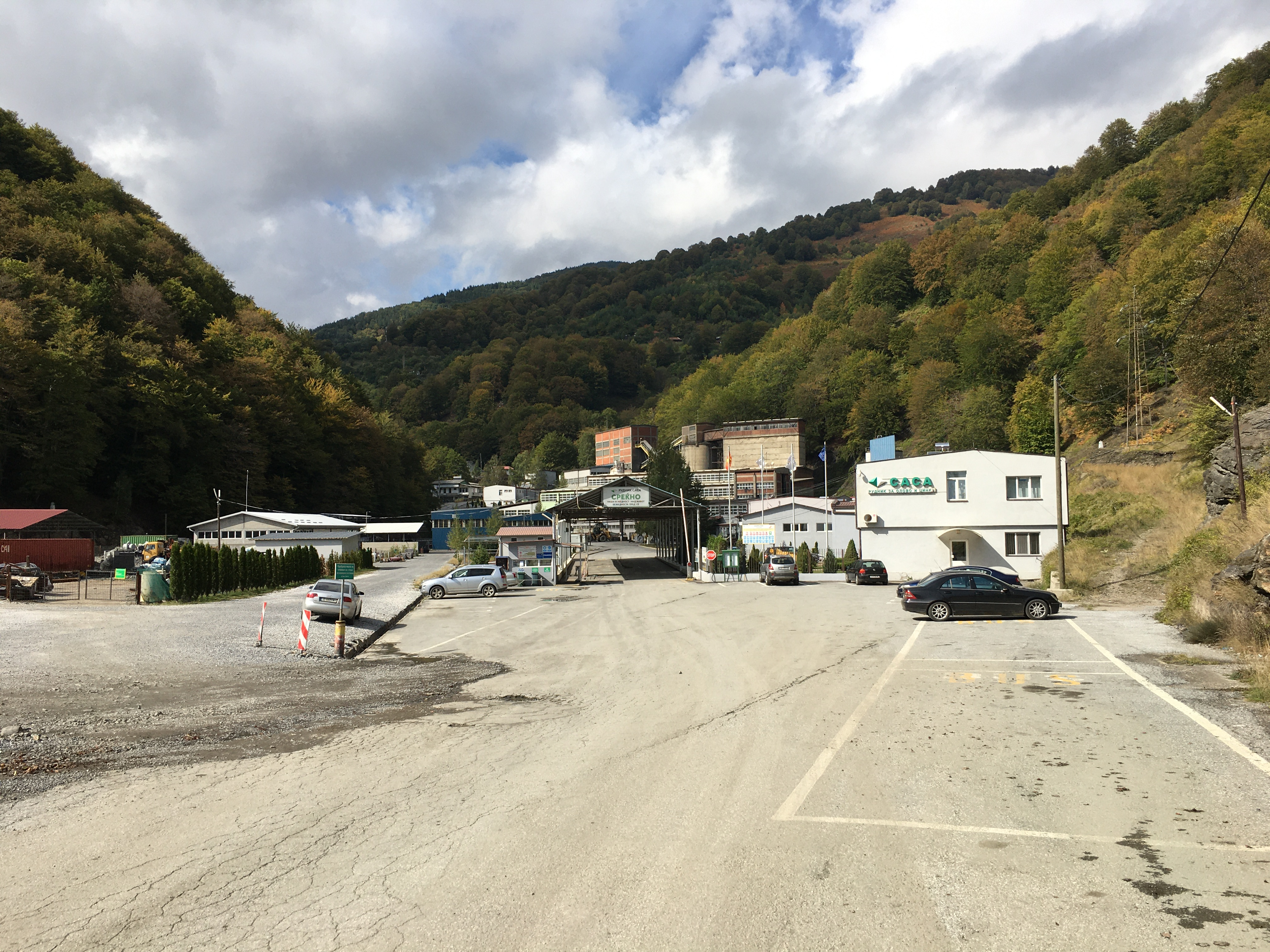
Administrative buildings of the Sasa mine

The Sasa ore deposit near the village was discovered during exploration between 1954 and 1965. The surrounding village is populated by around 1000 civilians; most are lower class and since the reopening of the mine in the 1960s, much of the male population has become miners.
