= Lubnica, Konče =

Lubnica Лубница
- Village
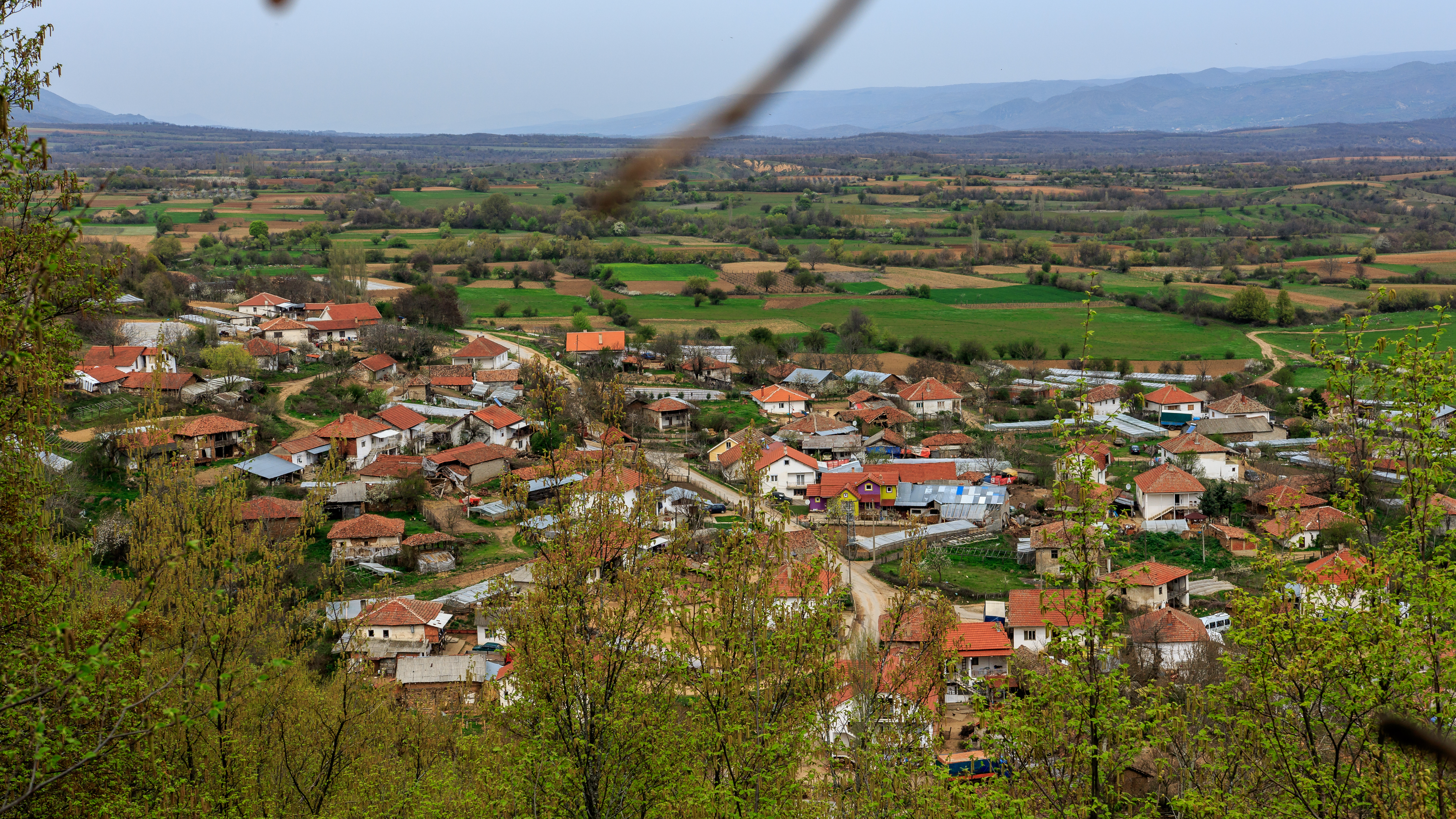

- Location within North Macedonia
- Coordinates: 41.500822°N 22.366365°E
- Country: North Macedonia
- Region: Southeastern
- Municipality: Konče

Population (2021)
  - Total: 252
- Time zone: UTC+1 (CET)
  - Summer (DST): UTC+2 (CEST)
- Website: .

Lubnica (Macedonian: Лубница) is a village in the municipality of Konče, North Macedonia.

== Demographics ==
According to the 2002 census, the village had a total of 361 inhabitants. Ethnic groups in the village include:

- Macedonians 359
- Serbs 1
- Others 1

As of 2021, the village of Lubnica has 252 inhabitants and the ethnic composition was the following:

- Macedonians – 241
- Albanians – 2
- Serbs – 1
- Person without Data - 8
