= Dolni Lipovikj =

Dolni Lipovikj Долни Липовик
- Village
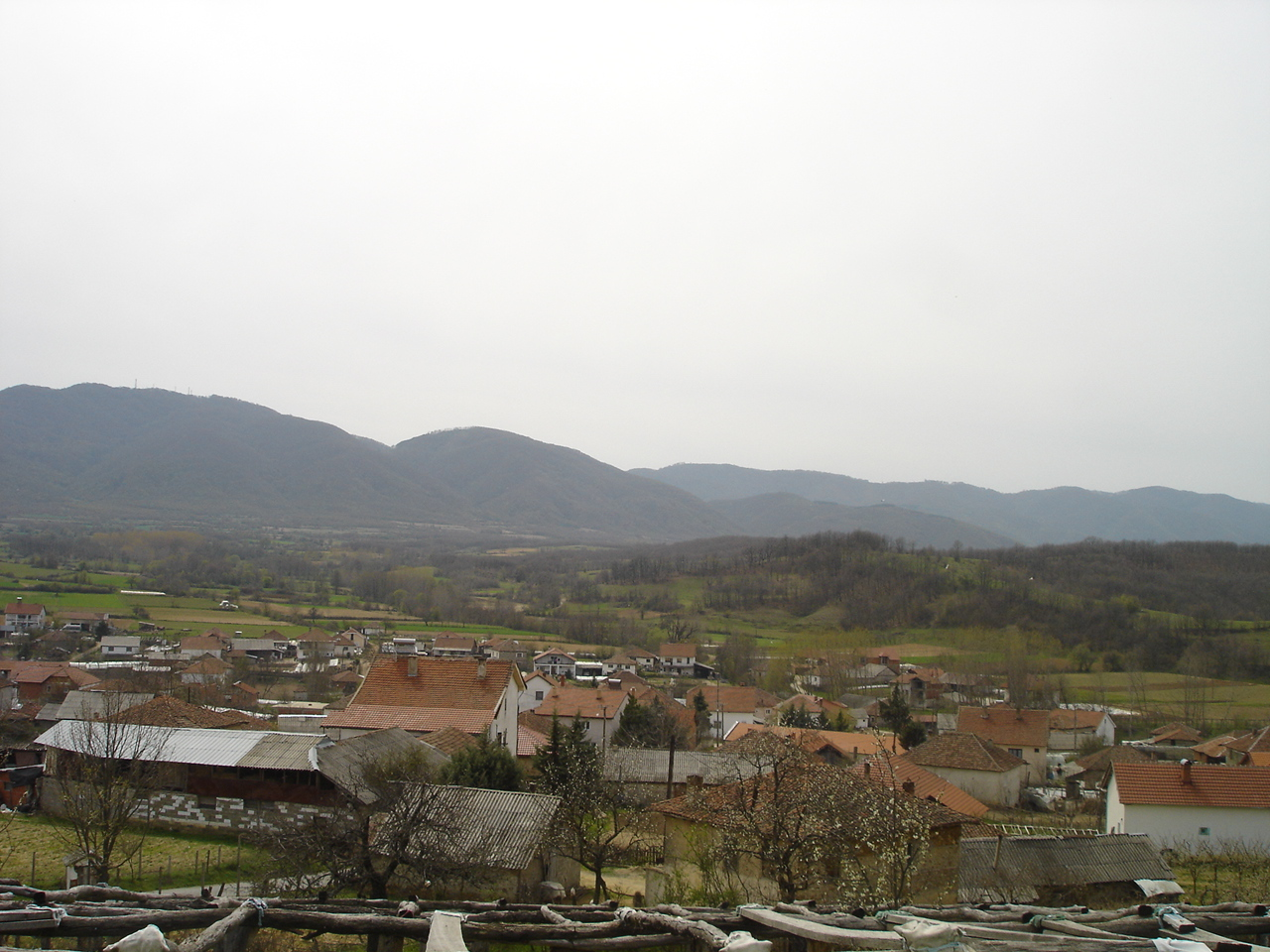

- Location within North Macedonia
- Coordinates: 41.504277°N 22.457089°E
- Country: North Macedonia
- Region: Southeastern
- Municipality: Konče

Population (2021)
  - Total: 362
- Time zone: UTC+1 (CET)
  - Summer (DST): UTC+2 (CEST)

Dolni Lipovikj (Macedonian: Долни Липовик) is a village in the municipality of Konče, North Macedonia.

== Demographics ==
According to the 2002 census, the village had a total of 423 inhabitants. Ethnic groups in the village include:

- Macedonians 423

As of 2021, the village of Dolni Lipovikj has 362 inhabitants and the ethnic composition was the following:

- Macedonians – 343
- Person without Data - 19
