= Konče Municipality =

Municipality of North Macedonia

Coordinates: 41.49°N 22.41°E

Konče Municipality Општина Конче Konçe Belediyesi
- Rural municipality
- Flag

- Country: North Macedonia
- Region: Southeastern
- Municipal seat: Konče

Government
  - Mayor: Zlatko Ristov (VMRO-DPMNE)

Area
  - Total: 233.05 km^{2} (89.98 sq mi)

Population
  - Total: 2,725
  - Density: 15.17/km^{2} (39.3/sq mi)
- Time zone: UTC+1 (CET)
- Postal code: 2424
- Area code: 032
- Vehicle registration: RA
- Website: http://www.Konce.gov.mk

Konče (Macedonian: Конче; Turkish: Konçe Belediyesi) is a municipality in the eastern part of North Macedonia. Konče is also the name of the village where the municipal seat is found. This municipality is part of the Southeastern Statistical Region.

Located below the slopes of Mount Serta, Konče is approximately 150 km away from the Skopje, North Macedonia's capital, on the Radovis-Strumica highway. The Municipality of Konce has a total area of 233.05 sq. Km and, as of the 2002 census, had a total population of 3,690 inhabitants. The ethnic composition of the Municipality of Konče's population consists primarily of Macedonians, but there is a significant Turkish minority. The current mayor of the Municipality of Konče is Blagoj Iliev.

== History ==
There have been settlements in the region that constitutes the Konče municipality for more than four thousand years. Archaeological research done through the Museum of Štip conducted in the village of Gabrevci uncovered an early prehistoric community from the Bronze Age. Artifacts including ceramics and bronze implements are on display at the Museum in an exhibition room dedicated to the Gabrevci excavation. Konče has its contemporary origins as a Medieval-era religious and administrative seat. The oldest church in the municipality is located in the village of Konče and is dedicated to St. Stephen, dating to the fourteenth century. The church and associated monastery were built by Nikola Stajnevik, a Duke of Tsar Dušan and King Uroš in 1366. This complex, especially the church in its artistic value, occupies an important place in the history of Macedonian medieval culture. There are still original frescoes on the churches walls. Katarina Branković (1418/19–1492), the Countess of Celje and daughter of Despot Đurađ Branković and Byzantine princess Irene Kantakouzene, is buried in Konče. She is remembered for the Varaždin Apostol (1454), and her endowment of the Rmanj Monastery.

== Geography ==
The Municipality of Konče is located in southeastern North Macedonia, about 150 km from the capital Skopje. The municipality is part of the Radovis region, and is statistically part of the Southeastern Statistical Region. Within the Municipality of Konče, there are 14 villages: Gabrevci, Garvan, Gorna Vrashtica, Gorni Lipovik, Dedino, Dolna Vrashtica, Dolni Lipovik, Dolni Radesh, Zagorci, Konche, Lubnica, Negrenovci, Rakitac, and Skorush. The center of the municipality is the village of Konče, from which the name of the municipality was derived. Some of these villages are currently not inhabited. Per the 2002 census, the municipality has a total population of 3,690 inhabitants with a population density of 15.17 inhabitants per square kilometer and a total area of 233.05 square kilometers. The municipality borders Štip Municipality to the north, Radoviš Municipality and Vasilevo Municipality to the east, Negotino Municipality and Demir Kapija Municipality to the west, and Strumica Municipality and Valandovo Municipality to the south. Mount Serta is a mountain above the village of Konče and, in the south of the municipality, is the man-made lake Mantovo. The river Kriva Lakavica, a tributary of Bregalnica, runs through the municipality to the village Dolni Lipovikj.

== Demographics ==
The municipality has 2,725 inhabitants according to the 2021 North Macedonia census. Ethnic groups in the municipality:

	2002		2021	
	Number	%	Number	%
TOTAL	3,536	100	2,725	100
Macedonians	3,009	85.1	1,947	71.45
Turks	521	14.74	606	22.23
Albanians			3	0.11
Serbs	3	0.08	1	0.04
Bosniaks			1	0.04
Other / Undeclared / Unknown	3	0.08	1	0.04
Persons for whom data are taken from administrative sources			166	6.09

The total number of students in the municipality in 2011, in comparison to the total number of students in 2007, increased for 6.5%. Konce is the second municipality in North Macedonia by rise of the total number of students.

== Economy ==
Livestock, water management, forestry, and agriculture are the primary industries in the Municipality of Konče in addition to hunting and fishing tourism. The municipality produces a large quantity of high-quality tobacco, Oriental tobacco, and more than 5% of the total tobacco production in North Macedonia is sourced from Konče. Most of the tobacco is produced by families on private land and is in turn sold to tobacco companies. Further, the municipality has recently partnered with the neighboring urban Municipality of Radoviš for economic development. The associated memorandum defines guidelines for this partnership through a new joint office for local economic development. This came as a result of current social and economic conditions and local authorities seeking improved synthesis of urban and rural sectors.

== Administration ==
The current mayor of the Municipality of Konče is Zlatko Ristov. The municipal council consists of nine members and they are:

- Ivana Ilova - President of the Council of the Municipality of Konce (village Lubnica)
- Ismail Kurtov - council member (village Konče)
- Andrijana Koceva - council member (village Dedino)
- Zoran Manchevski - council member (village Rakitec)
- Marjan Jankov - council member (village Gabrevci)
- Marem Ismailov - council member (village Konče)
- Ivana Stefanova - council member (village Lubnica)
- Slavica Stefanova - council member (village Lubnica)
- Žarko Trajkov - council member (village Dolni Lipovikj)

== Inhabited places ==
The number of the inhabited places in the municipality is 14.

Inhabited places in Konče Municipality
Villages: Gabrevci | Garvan | Gorna Vraštica | Gorni Lipoviḱ | Dedino | Dolna Vraštica | Dolni Lipovikj | Dolni Radeš | Zagorci | Konče | Lubnica | Negrenovci | Rakitec | Skoruša |
