= Todorovci =

Todorovci Тодоровци
- Village
- Location within North Macedonia
- Coordinates: 41.999301°N 22.621128°E
- Country: North Macedonia
- Region: Eastern
- Municipality: Makedonska Kamenica

Population (2002)
  - Total: 235
- Time zone: UTC+1 (CET)
  - Summer (DST): UTC+2 (CEST)
- Website: .

Todorovci (Macedonian: Тодоровци) is a village in the municipality of Makedonska Kamenica, North Macedonia.

== Demographics ==
According to the 2002 census, the village had a total of 235 inhabitants. Ethnic groups in the village include:

- Macedonians 235
