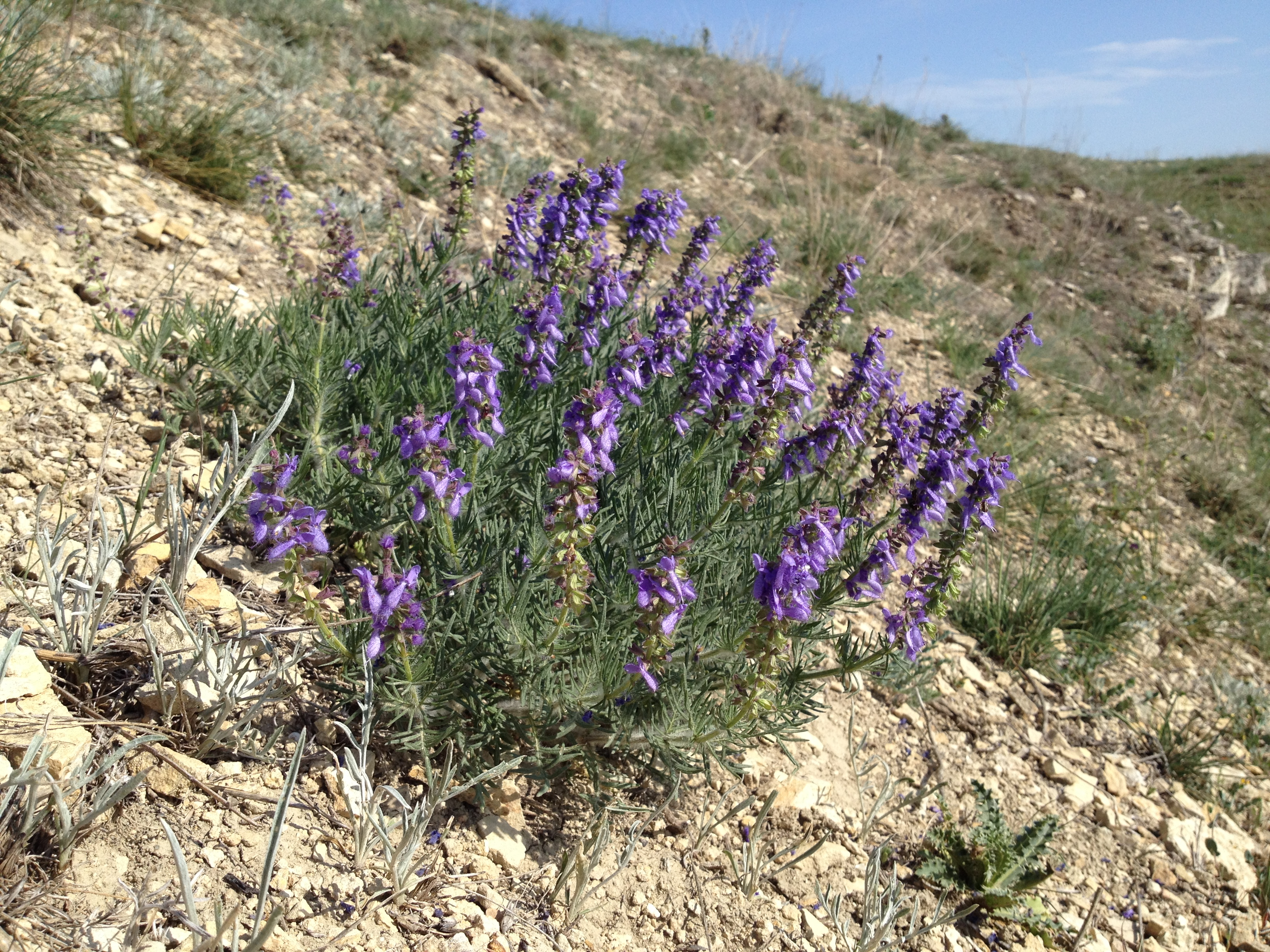

Scientific classification
- Kingdom: Plantae
- Clade: Embryophytes
- Clade: Tracheophytes
- Clade: Angiosperms
- Clade: Eudicots
- Clade: Asterids
- Order: Lamiales
- Family: Lamiaceae
- Genus: Salvia
- Species: S. jurisicii

Binomial name
- Salvia jurisicii Košanin

= Salvia jurisicii =

Species of flowering plant

Salvia jurisicii, commonly known as Jurisic sage and Yugoslavian cut leaf sage or locally as Ovche Pole sage, is a hardy herbaceous perennial endemic to the steppe-like region in central North Macedonia. Together with other rare species, Salvia jurisicii is a key component of the “Macedonian steppe” ecotype. Mainly due to agricultural activity, this species is considered critically endangered in its native habitat.

== Description ==
Salvia jurisicii is a small compact plant, about 30 cm (12 in) tall and wide, with pinnate leaves that have linear segments. The olive-green leaves are much-branched, with hairs on the back of the ribs and leaves giving the plant a frothy appearance. The small flowers are covered in hairs and grow in closely spaced whorls that are turned upside down. The flower colour ranges from white to violet.

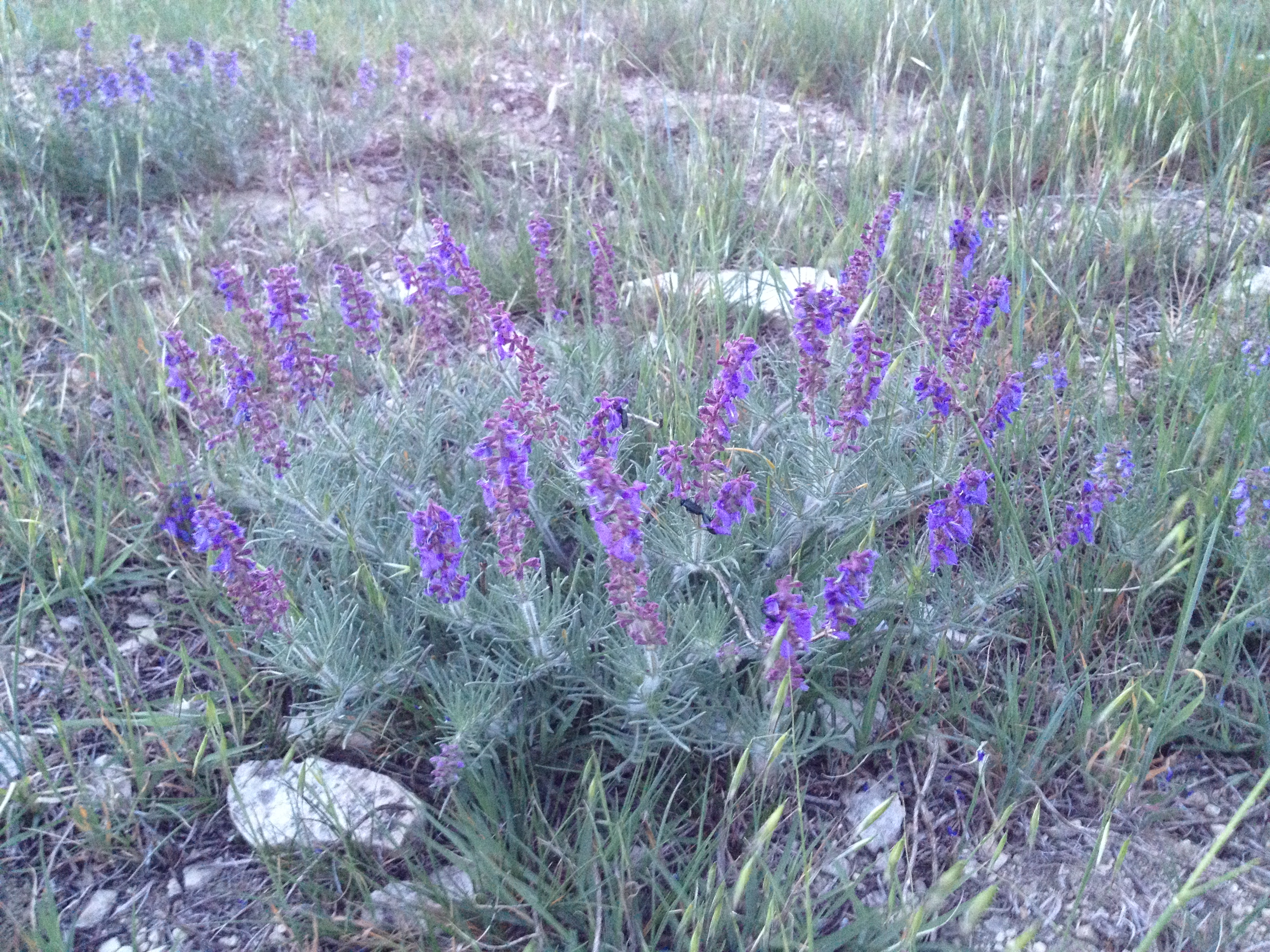
Salvia jurisicii in bloom.

== Habitat ==
Salvia jurisicii was first described by Koshanin, in 1923, from the Ovche Pole basin in central North Macedonia. Various climatic, geological and anthropogenic factors have contributed to the development of a characteristic xerothermic, steppe-like vegetation in this region – a so-called “Macedonian steppe”. The typical floristic associations for this eco-type, including its unique endemic and halophytic elements, have been described by Matevski et al. With the hill Orlovo Brdo in the adjacent Negotino municipality in North Macedonia, Ovche Pole constitutes the total area of distribution for Salvia jurisicii – less than 300 km^{2} (120 sq mi). In fact, up to 70% of the populations are found between the municipalities Sveti Nikole and Shtip. In Ovche Pole, isolated populations of Salvia jurisicii have been registered in the vicinities of the villages Mustafino, Vrsakovo, Sudikj, and Delisinci.

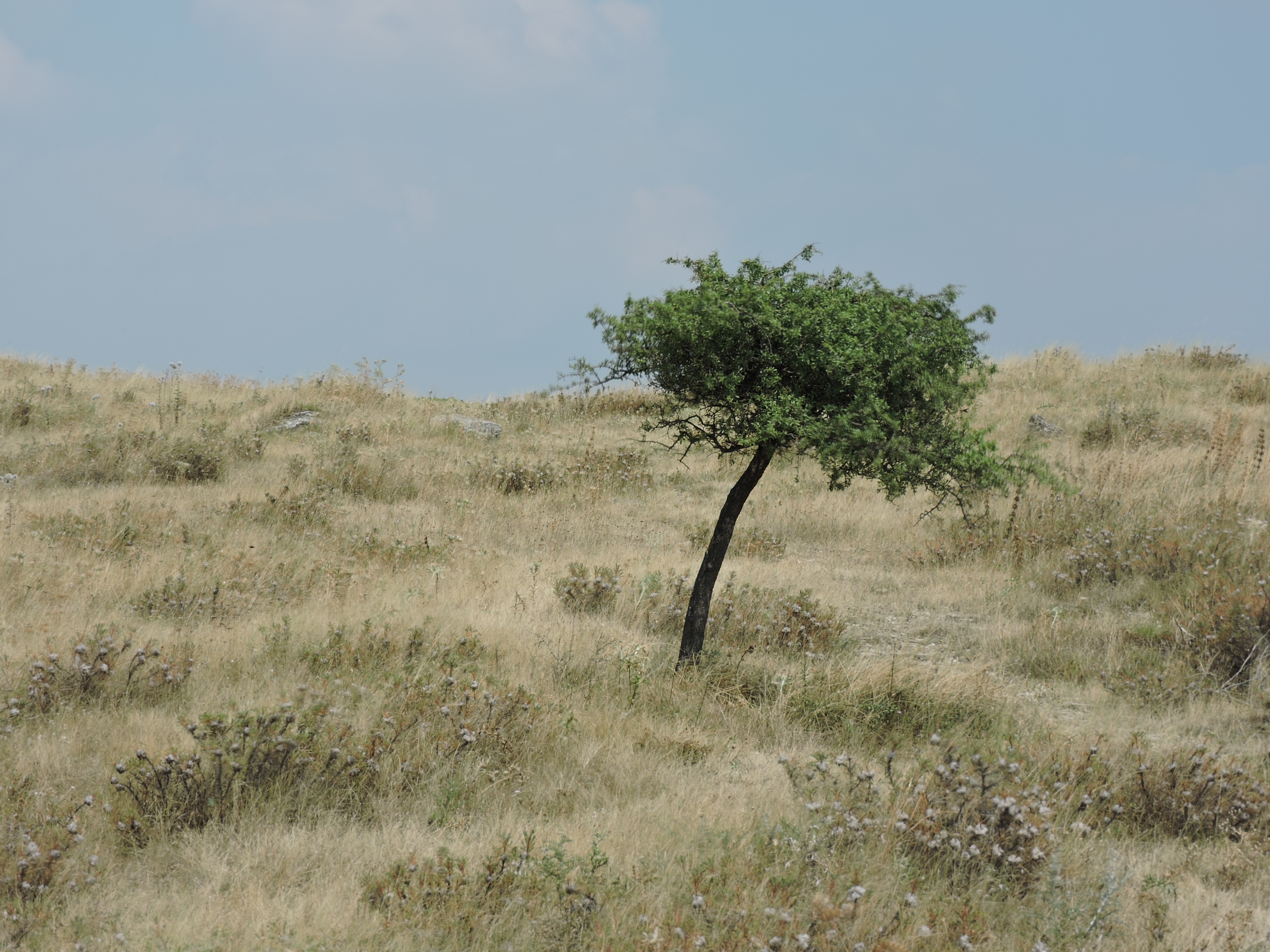
Macedonian steppe (Mustafino, Ovche Pole)

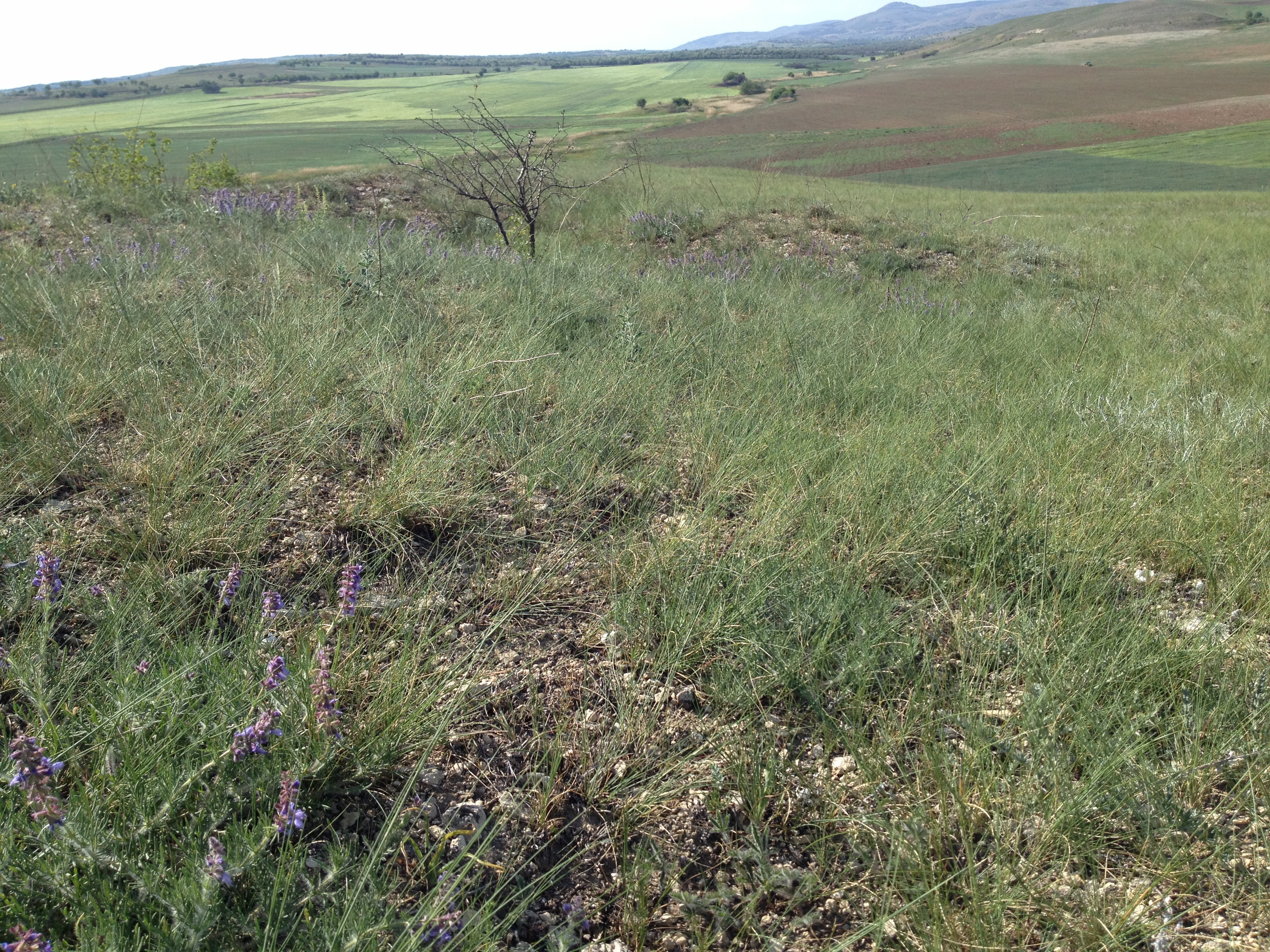
Salvia jurisicii habitat (Mustafino, Ovche Pole)

== Conservation ==
The construction of an irrigation canal in Ovche Pole during the 1970s contributed to the gradual expansion of farmland in this region. Previously covering most of Ovche Pole, the steppe vegetation as a result now occupies only a small fraction, on non-cultivated areas – “islands”, scattered across this territory. As a rule, Salvia jurisicii appears on a few non-disturbed such “islands” exclusively. Surrounding agricultural activity impedes the natural migration of this species, forming geographically isolated populations. Where the non-cultivated areas are arable, these populations are especially threatened by expanding farmland and land usurpation.

Another significant threat to this species stems from development projects (roads, power-lines, windmills, landfills, etc.) implemented across Ovche Pole. The combination of permissive ecological surveying and poor implementation renders these projects their character as a pending threat to the future survival of this species. Other noteworthy threats include illegal plant collection, afforestation activities, and wildfires. These various threats are especially pronounced in Ovche Pole, where Salvia jurisicii does not enjoy any sort of formal protection currently.

Seeing its very limited distribution, a 1998 work by Walter and Gillet classifies this species as Rare (“R”) on the IUCN Red List of species according to the contemporary IUCN criteria. Salvia jurisicii is not yet assessed in line with the current IUCN criteria. However, according to relevant national lists and botanical experts, the applicable category for this species is Critically Endangered (“CR”).

Partly in connection to Salvia jurisicii, several locations in the extended steppe-like region have either been protected or are considered for some form of protection. Thus, Orlovo Brdo in Negotino municipality currently enjoys the status of a Natural Monument in North Macedonia. In the Ovche Pole basin, the hill Bogoslovec is assessed as an Important Plant Area (IPA) and the Ovche Pole basin as a whole as a Key Biodiversity Area (KBA). Ovche Pole is also a future Natura 2000 Site of Community Importance (SCI).

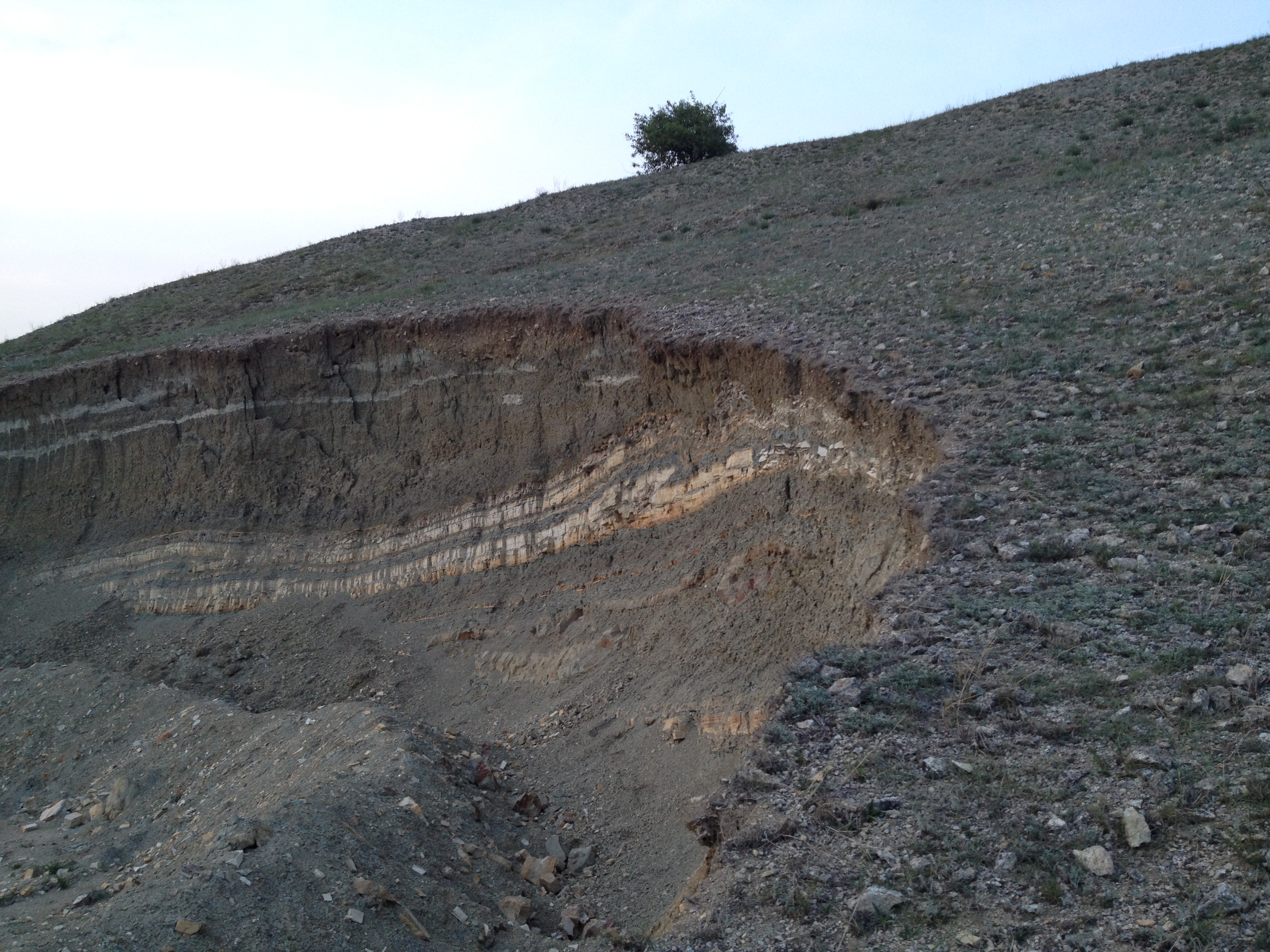
Salvia jurisicii habitats are often exploited for resources in construction projects (Mustafino, Ovche Pole)

== Use ==
The phytochemical properties of Salvia jurisicii are considered comparable to those of the culinary sage, Salvia officinalis. This is supported by Alimpich et al., whose phytochemical analysis of above-ground parts of Salvia jurisicii indicates that the plant, especially the leaves, could be regarded as a potential source of natural antioxidants. This study argues for the economic potential of Salvia jurisicii, with possible value for the cosmetic industry and medicine. However, S. jurisicii has not yet been grown or harvested commercially for this purpose.

Salvia jurisicii also has ornamental value. Clebsch argues that the plant's horticultural properties make it especially adequate for the rock garden. It is compact, tidy, as well as resistant to drought and winter cold. Clebsch also indicates that, in addition to the wild-type with purple flowers, there also is a white-flowering variety called “Alba”. As a garden plant, Salvia jurisicii is not particularly demanding. It can be grown from seed or from cuttings, its needs being easily draining soil, weekly irrigation, and plenty of sunlight.

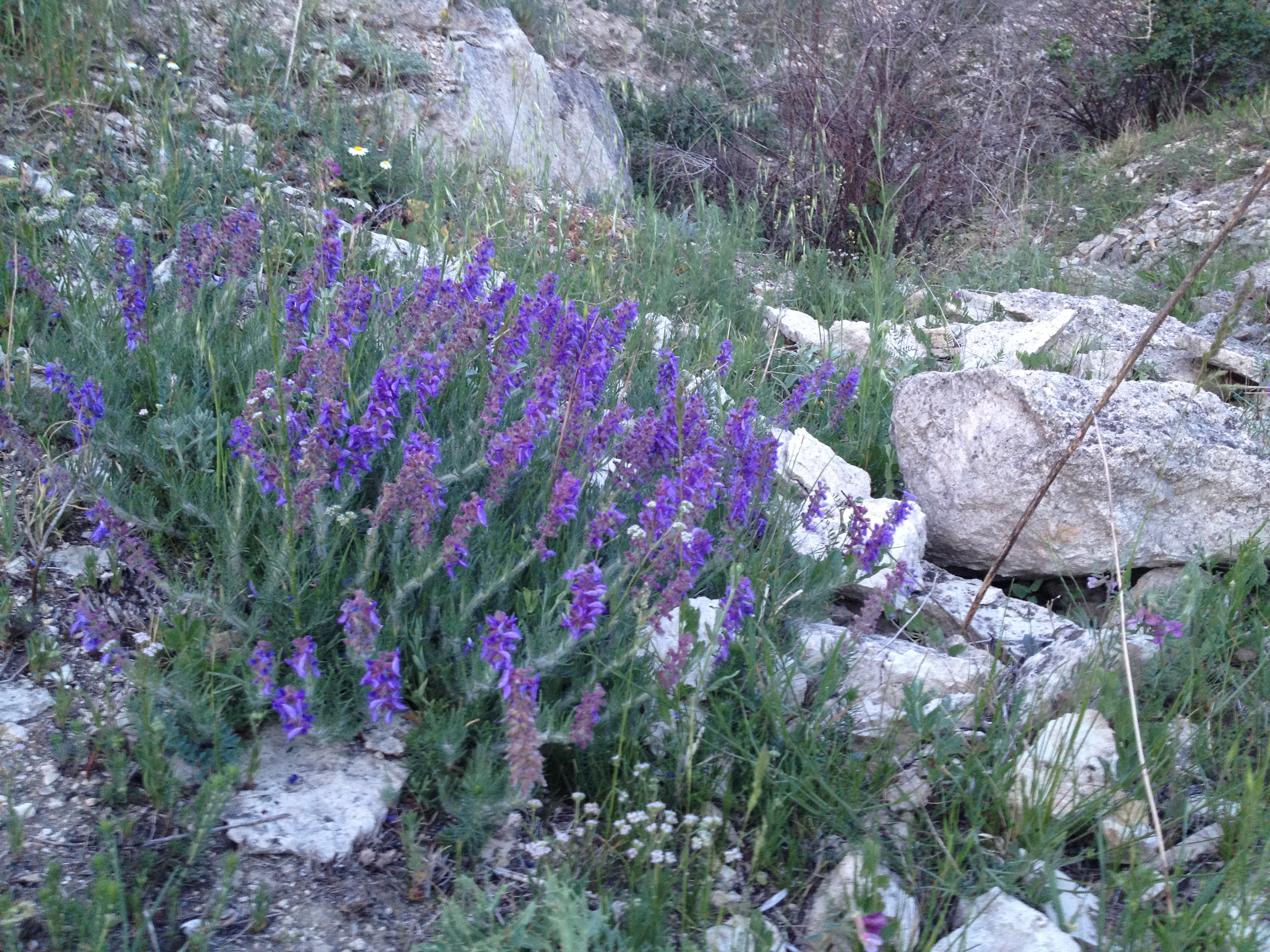
Salvia jurisicii in a rock quarry (Mustafino, Ovche Pole)
