= Cera, Croatia =

Cera
- Village
- Location within Croatia
- Coordinates: 43°42′17″N 16°11′34″E
- Country: Croatia
- County: Šibenik-Knin County
- Municipality: Unešić

Area
  - Total: 2.6 sq mi (6.8 km^{2})
- Elevation: 814 ft (248 m)

Population (2021)
  - Total: 25
  - Density: 9.5/sq mi (3.7/km^{2})
- Time zone: UTC+1 (CET)
  - Summer (DST): UTC+2 (CEST)
- Postal code: 22322 Ružić

Cera is a village in Šibenik-Knin County, Croatia. The settlement is administered as a part of Unešić municipality. In the 2011 census, it had a total of 53 inhabitants.
