= Makedonska Kamenica Municipality =

Municipality of North Macedonia

Coordinates: 42.01°N 22.58°E

Municipality of Makedonska Kamenica Општина Македонска Каменица
- Urban municipality
- Flag Seal

- Country: North Macedonia
- Region: Eastern
- Municipal seat: Makedonska Kamenica

Government
  - Mayor: Dimčo Atanasovski (VMRO-DPMNE)

Area
  - Total: 190.37 km^{2} (73.50 sq mi)

Population
  - Total: 6,439
  - Density: 33.82/km^{2} (87.60/sq mi)
- Time zone: UTC+1 (CET)
- Postal code: 2304
- Area code: 033
- Vehicle registration: MK
- Website: http://www.makedonskakamenica.gov.mk

Makedonska Kamenica (Macedonian: Македонска Каменица [maˈkɛdɔnska kaˈmɛnitsa]) is a municipality in eastern North Macedonia. Makedonska Kamenica is also the name of the town where the municipal seat is located. The municipality is part of Eastern Statistical Region.

== Geography ==
The municipality borders the Kriva Palanka Municipality in the north, Bulgaria and the Delčevo Municipality to the east, the Kočani Municipality to the west, and the Vinica Municipality to the south.

== Demographics ==
The Makedonska Kamenica Municipality has 6,439 inhabitants according to the 2021 North Macedonia census. Ethnic groups in the municipality:

	2002		2021	
	Number	%	Number	%
TOTAL	8,110	100	6,439	100
Macedonians	8,055	99.32	5,975	92.79
Serbs	24	0.3	9	0.13
Bosniaks	8	0.1	9	0.13
Albanians			6	0.1
Turks			2	0.03
Roma	14	0.17		
Other / Undeclared / Unknown	9	0.11	15	0.25
Persons for whom data are taken from administrative sources			423	6.57

Demographics of the Makedonska Kamenica municipality
Census year	Population
1994	8,084
2002	8,110
2021	6,439

== Inhabited places ==
Inhabited places in the Makedonska Kamenica Municipality
Villages: Dulica (Дулица) | Kosevica (Косевица) | Kostin Dol (Костин Дол) | Lukovica (Луковица) | Gabar (Моштица) | Sasa (Саса) | Todorovci (Тодоровци) | Cera (Цера) | Towns: Makedonska Kamenica (Македонска Каменица)
