= Grdovci =

Macedonian village

Grdovci Грдовци
- Village
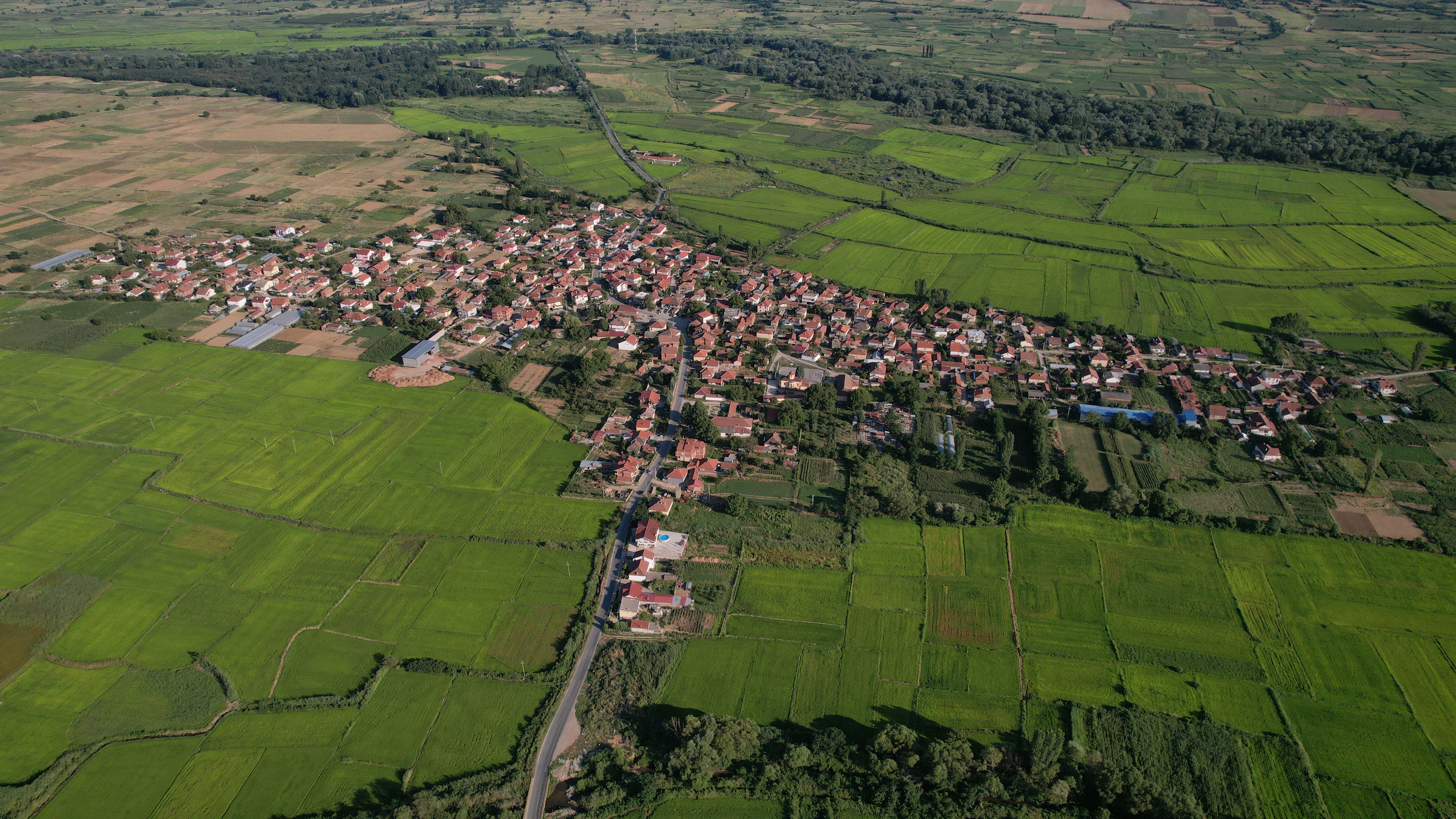
- Air view of the village

- Location within North Macedonia
- Country: North Macedonia
- Region: Eastern
- Municipality: Kočani

Population (2002)
  - Total: 1,288
- Time zone: UTC+1 (CET)
  - Summer (DST): UTC+2 (CEST)
- Website: .

Grdovci (Macedonian: Грдовци) is a village in the municipality of Kočani, North Macedonia. The village is located in the Kočani Valley, and according to the last census of 2002 the village had 1,288 residents.

== Geography ==
Grdovci is located in the heart of the Kočani Valley, between the Bregalnica River and Orizarska River. The village is 3.7 kilometers from the center of Kočani and it is the most well-urbanized village in the Kočani region. 80% of the roads in the village are paved with asphalt. Water and sewage systems were installed in the early 1980s. 3 substations provide constant electricity to the village.

== History ==
Grdovci is one of the oldest inhabited regions in area around the Bregalnica River. The first mention of Grdovci was from a traveler's mention of the area in 1371, in which Grdovci was mentioned in reference to the economic and religious center of the time - Morozbizdon/Morodvis. The name Grdovci comes from the Old Church Slavonic word "grd" which has multiple meanings:

- proud
- brave
- conceited

The name supposedly referred to characteristics of the first inhabitants of the area in the Middle Ages.

In the 19th century, Grdovci was part of the Kočani Kaza, an administrative division of the Ottoman Empire. In 1900, according to the Bulgarian ethnographer, Vasil Kančov, the village had 505 residents, of which 380 were Christian Bulgarians and 125 were Turkish.

In 1905, according to the Bulgarian Dimitar Mišev, the village had 504 Christian Bulgarian residents.

== Economy ==
The main form of work for the inhabitants of Grdovci is agriculture, in particular the harvesting of what the locals call "white gold" - rice. In the fields located around Grdovci, rice of the highest quality from the region is produced. This rice is well known throughout the region and is a main feature of the municipality. The largest number of the working residents work in Kočani. Grdovci is the local village with the most stores and restaurants per resident. Currently there are 6 food stores, 2 markets for various goods, 3 cafés/bars, 2 kafana, and one internet cafe. Likewise the village has a privately owned factory for the preparation of rice as well as a factory that produces automobile parts.

== Demographics ==
According to the 2002 census, Grdovci has 1,288 residents. Ethnic groups in the village include:

- 1281 are Macedonians
- 7 other

Today, Grdovci has above 1,600 residents and around 400 households.

As of 2021, the village of Grdovci has 930 inhabitants and the ethnic composition was the following:

- Macedonians – 886
- Albanians – 1
- Serbs – 1
- Bosniaks - 1
- others – 1
- Person without Data - 40

== Culture and sports ==
The village has a football club named "Argos", which regularly competes in the regional football league, as well as in the Ilendenski Sports games in Češinovo and the Bogorodični tournament in the village Dolni Podlog.
