= Kočani Valley =

Valley in North Macedonia

Coordinates: 41°55′N 22°24′E

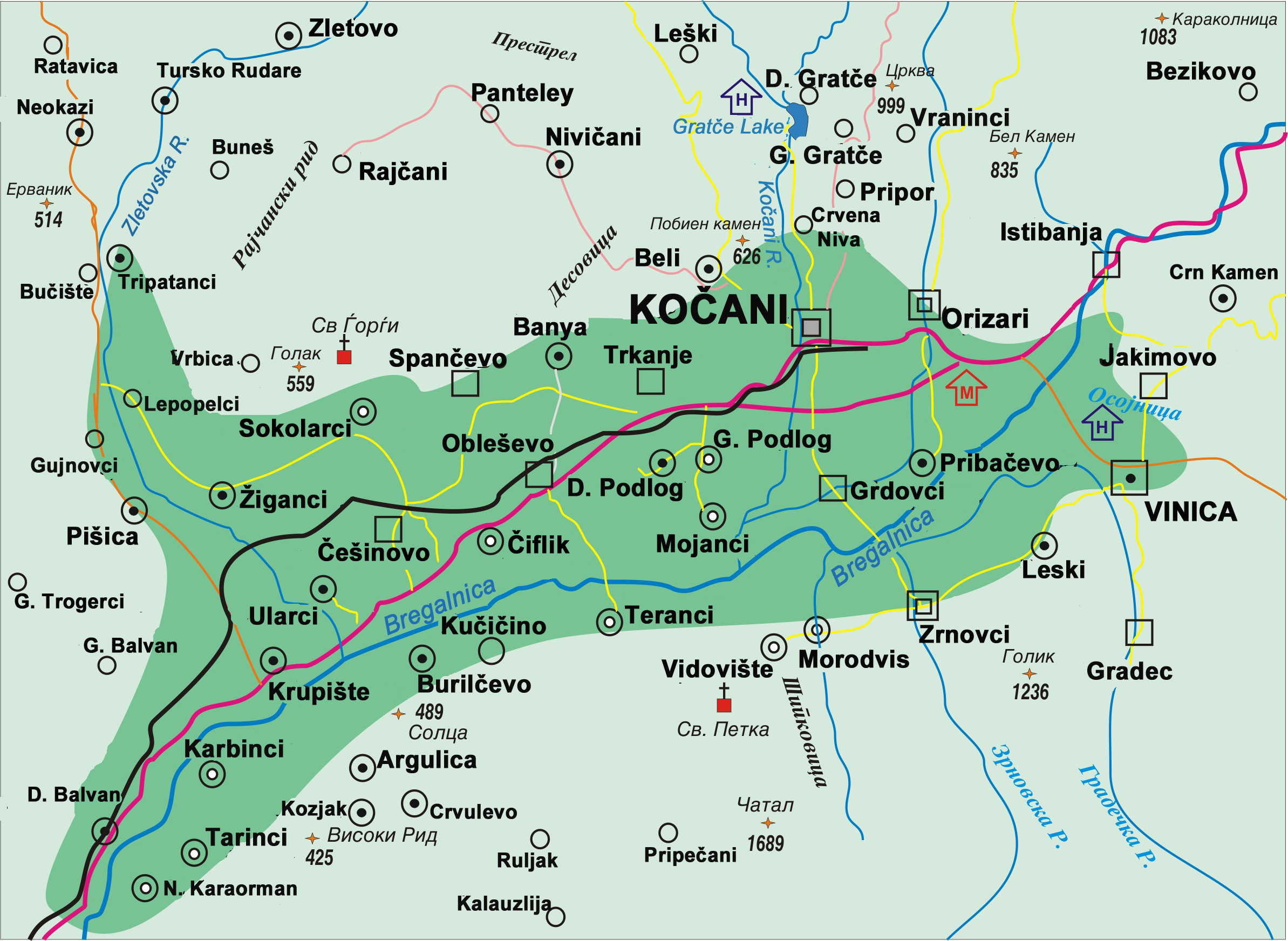
The Kočani Valley

The Ploughman's Tale
Excerpt of speech by a woman from Kočani Valley in the native Štip – Kočani dialect

Kočani Valley (Macedonian: Кочанска Котлина, romanized: Kočanska Kotlina) is located along the river Bregalnica in the eastern part of North Macedonia, at the latitude of 41° and 55' and longitude 22° and 25'. It covers an area of 1020 km² and extends from both sides of Bregalnica, stretching from west-southwest to east-northeast, with a length of 26 km. The bottom of the valley, i.e. its flat portion, covers an area of 115 km². The lowest point is in the western part, where the Zletovska River flows into the Bregalnica, at an altitude of 290 meters. Going east, the elevation gradually rises up to 330 meters. The difference between the lowest to the highest elevation of the valley is 40 meters.

For certain parts of the valley there are specific names. Thus, the middle part is known as Fields of Kočani (or Kočansko), the southeast part as Viničko, and the west as Zletovsko. The territory around the major villages is named: Orizarsko, Istibanjsko, Zrnovsko, Obleshevsko and others.

The valley has fertile soil and plentiful water, which is ideal for growing cereals, especially rice, in these excellent natural conditions.

== History ==
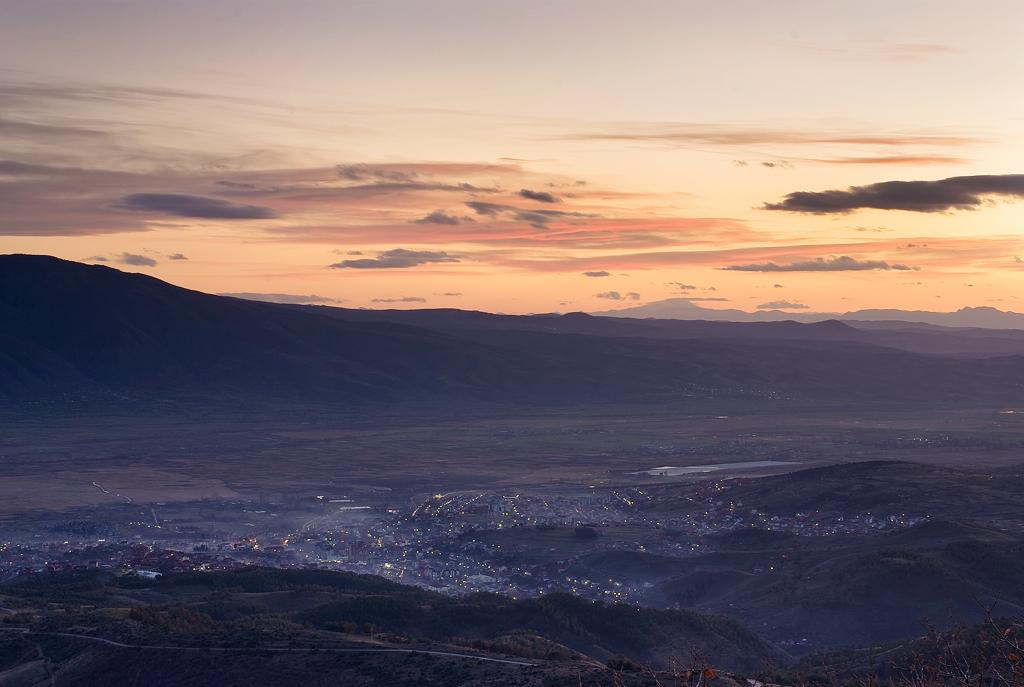
Kočani valley at dawn

According to previous tests, come up to scientific findings that the valley emerged by tectonic influences. Crucial importance for today's form and relief structure had tectonic movements that occurred before the middle of Oligocene. At that period the ground came down between two splitting lines, one from the north (Osogovo) and another from the south (Plačkovica). In late Miocene and early Pliocene, the valley was flooded by freshwater lake, which along with other neighboring lakes created the Middle Vardar's Lake. The depth of this pliocene lake was over 500 meters.

== Climate ==
The annual air temperature at average is 13 °C, which ranks this valley among warm valleys in the country. It is similar to the air temperature at Veles or Strumica valley. Kočani Valley is rich in thermal springs, especially in the villages of Istibanja, Dolni Podlog, Banja and Krupište. In the village of Dolni Podlog, near Kočani, two drillings of 35 meters and 460 meters are made, with 300 liter/sec. and temperatures between 70-80 °C. Medicinal properties of the thermal water from Kočani valley, according to Risto Chanev, are identical with the water in the baths of Negorci, near Gevgelija.
