= Jakimovo, Vinica =

Jakimovo Јакимово
- Village
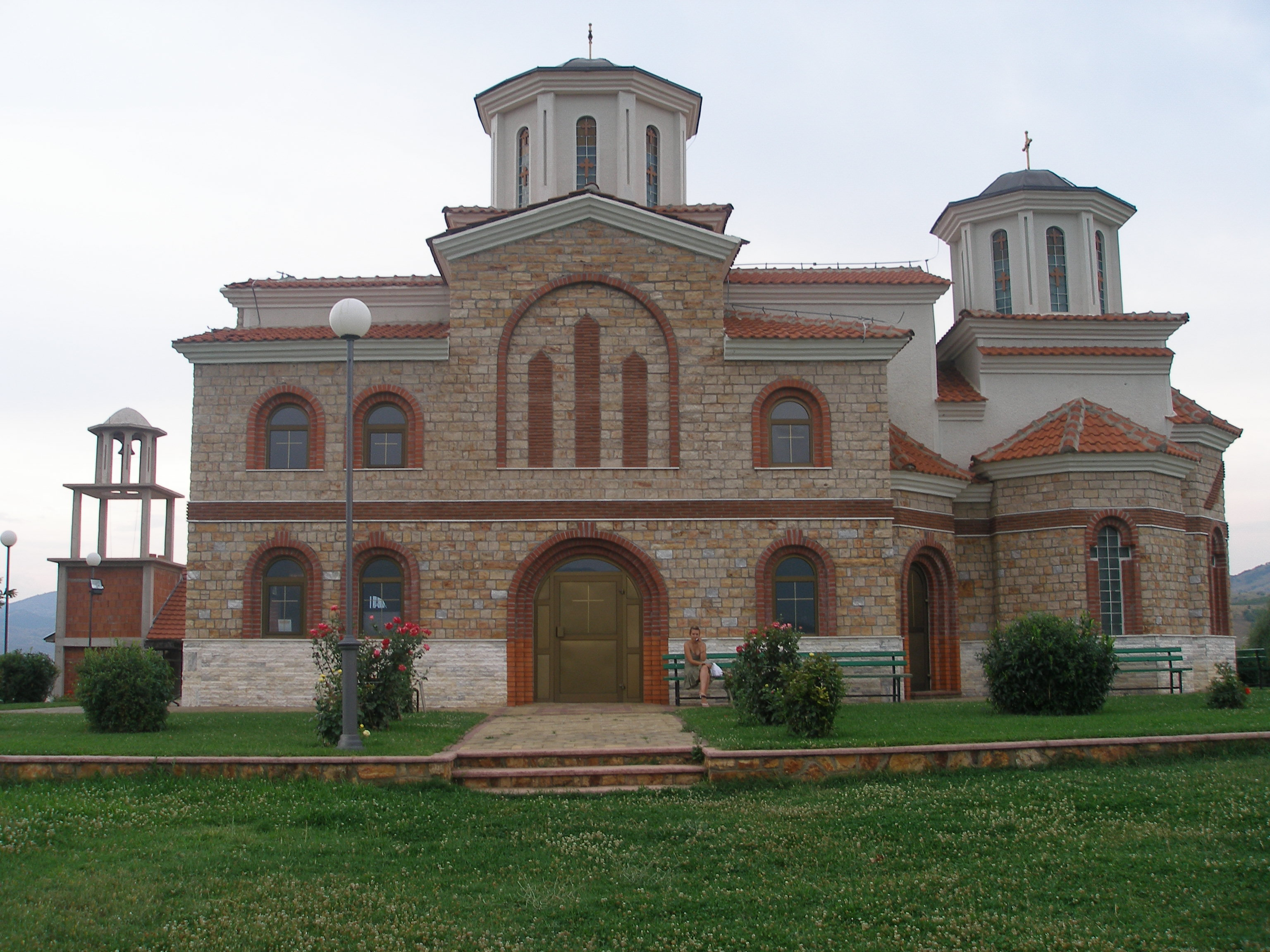
- St. Joachim of Osogovo Church

- Location within North Macedonia
- Coordinates: 41.899362°N 22.511948°E
- Country: North Macedonia
- Region: Eastern
- Municipality: Vinica

Population (2002)
  - Total: 1,101
- Time zone: UTC+1 (CET)
  - Summer (DST): UTC+2 (CEST)
- Website: .

Jakimovo (Macedonian: Јакимово) is a village in the municipality of Vinica, North Macedonia.

== Demographics ==
According to the 2002 census, the village had a total of 1,101 inhabitants. Ethnic groups in the village include:

- Macedonians 1,088
- Serbs 3
- Aromanians 10
