= Žiganci =

Žiganci Жиганци
- Village
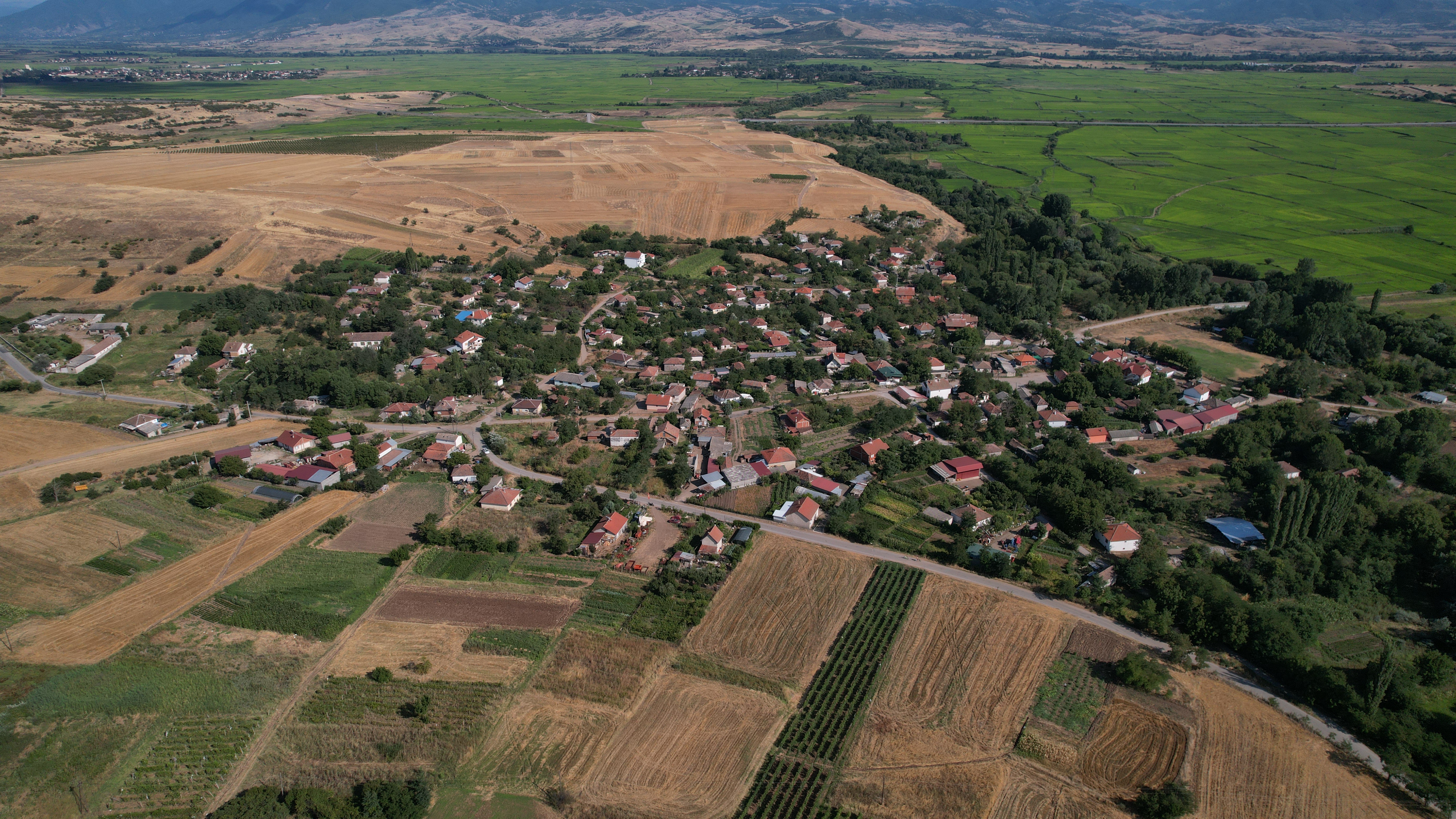
- Air view of the village

- Location within North Macedonia
- Coordinates: 41.8792346°N 22.236518°E
- Country: North Macedonia
- Region: Eastern
- Municipality: Češinovo-Obleševo

Population (2002)
  - Total: 362
- Time zone: UTC+1 (CET)
  - Summer (DST): UTC+2 (CEST)
- Website: .

Žiganci (Macedonian: Жиганци) is a village in the municipality of Češinovo-Obleševo, North Macedonia. It used to be part of the former municipality of Češinovo.

== Name ==
The village is registered in a 15th-century Ottoman defter with the name Arbanash, derived from the Slavic word Arbanas meaning "Albanian". A century later it is recorded with two names, Žiganci and the older form Arbanash. The latter toponym with the name Arbanash is no longer in use. In this settlement at that time Christian names dominated, but there were also heads of families with mixed Christian-Slavic names. Some heads of families bore traditional Albanian Christian names, such as: Pavël Spano, Niko Tola, Niko Dimitri, Gjiro Prono (Prroni), Stepan Pronko (Prroni).

== Demographics ==
According to the 2002 census, the village had a total of 362 inhabitants. Ethnic groups in the village include:

- Macedonians 362
