= Štip-Kočani dialect =

Dialect of Macedonian

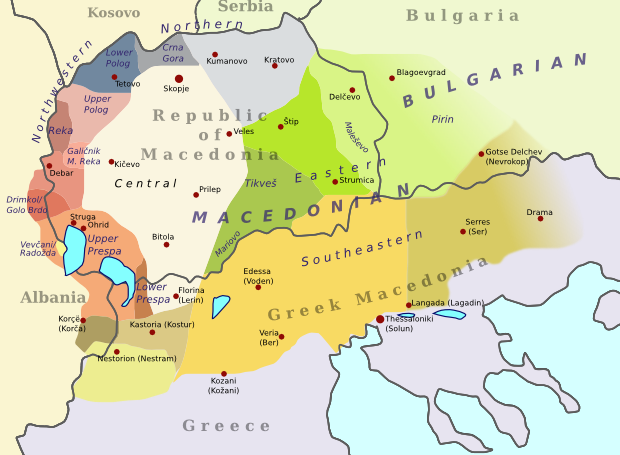
The Štip-Kočani dialect on the map of the Macedonian dialects

About the wedding customs in Štip
Excerpt of speech by a woman from Štip speaking in the dialect about the local wedding customs

The Ploughman's Tale
Excerpt of speech by a woman from Kočani Valley

Luck in Cards and a Bag from God
Excerpt of speech by a woman from Bučište, Probištip region

The Štip-Kočani (Macedonian: Штипско - Кочански дијалект, Štipsko - Kočanski dijalekt) is a dialect of Macedonian. It is a member of the eastern group of the Macedonian dialects. This dialect is spoken in the central eastern part of Macedonia, respectively in Štip, Probištip, Kočani, Vinica, Radoviš and in the surrounding areas.

== Characteristics ==
- Use of the preposition у (во град > у градо)
- Use of the word "speak"

| Eastern speech | Standard Macedonian | English |
|---|---|---|
| Zboram | Zboruvam/Govoram | speak |

- the word "tomatoes"

| Eastern speech | Standard Macedonian | English |
|---|---|---|
| patlidžan | domat | tomatoes |

- use of the word "stairs"

| Eastern speech | Standard Macedonian | English |
|---|---|---|
| merdeveni/stepenici | skali | stairs |

== Personal Pronouns ==
=== Singular ===
- Ја (I)
- Ти (You)
- Он (He)
- Она (She)
- Оноа (Оно) (It)

=== Plural ===
- Ние (We)
- Вие (You)
- Они (Тиа) (They)
