= Trsino =

Trsino Трсино
- Village
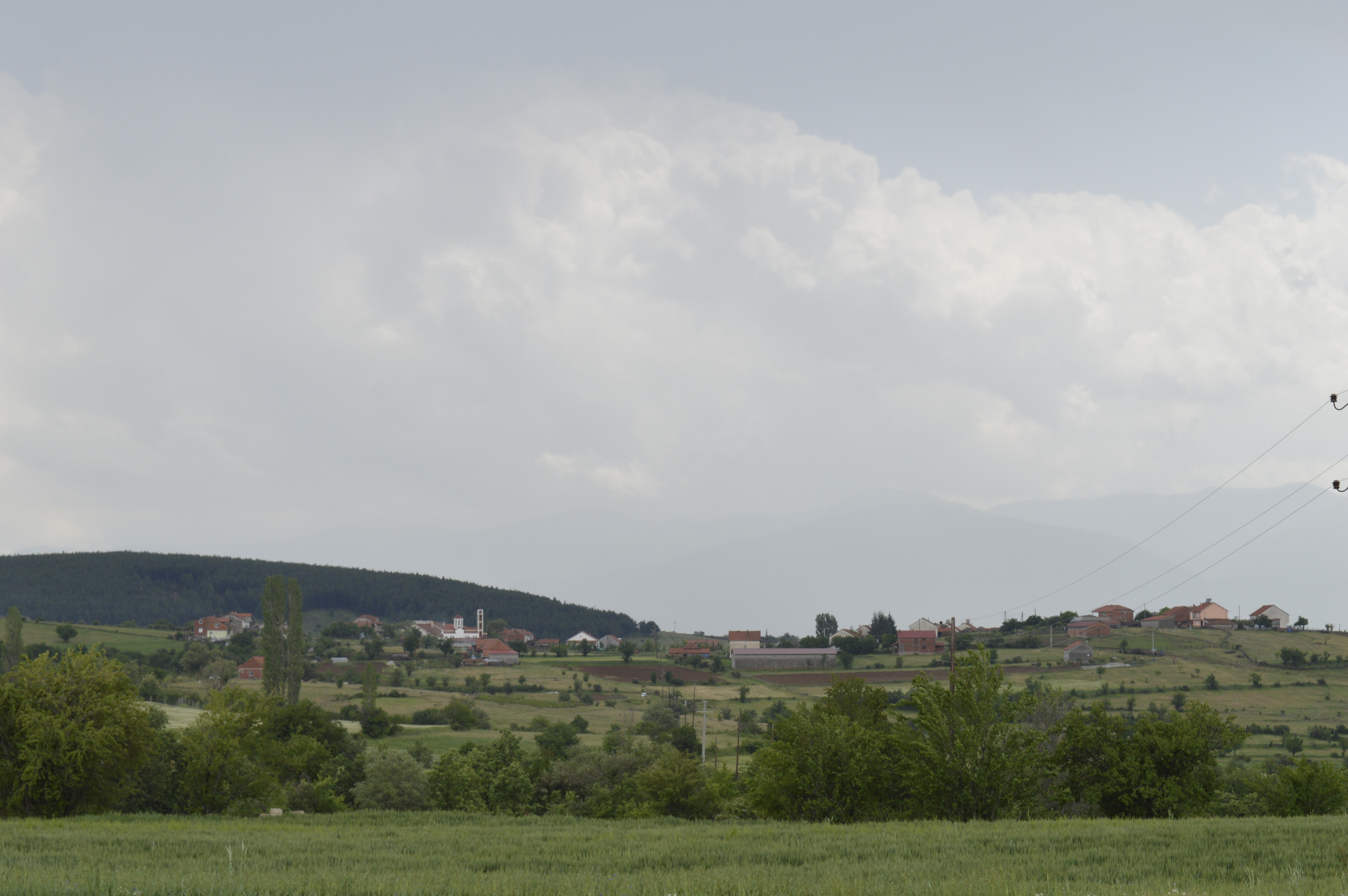
- View of the village

- Location within North Macedonia
- Coordinates: 41.910532°N 22.649618°E
- Country: North Macedonia
- Region: Eastern
- Municipality: Vinica

Population (2002)
  - Total: 730
- Time zone: UTC+1 (CET)
  - Summer (DST): UTC+2 (CEST)
- Website: .

Trsino (Macedonian: Трсино) is a village in the municipality of Vinica, North Macedonia.

== Demographics ==
According to the 2002 census, the village had a total of 730 inhabitants. Ethnic groups in the village include:

- Macedonians 723
- Turks 7
