= Beli, Kočani =

Beli Бели
- Village
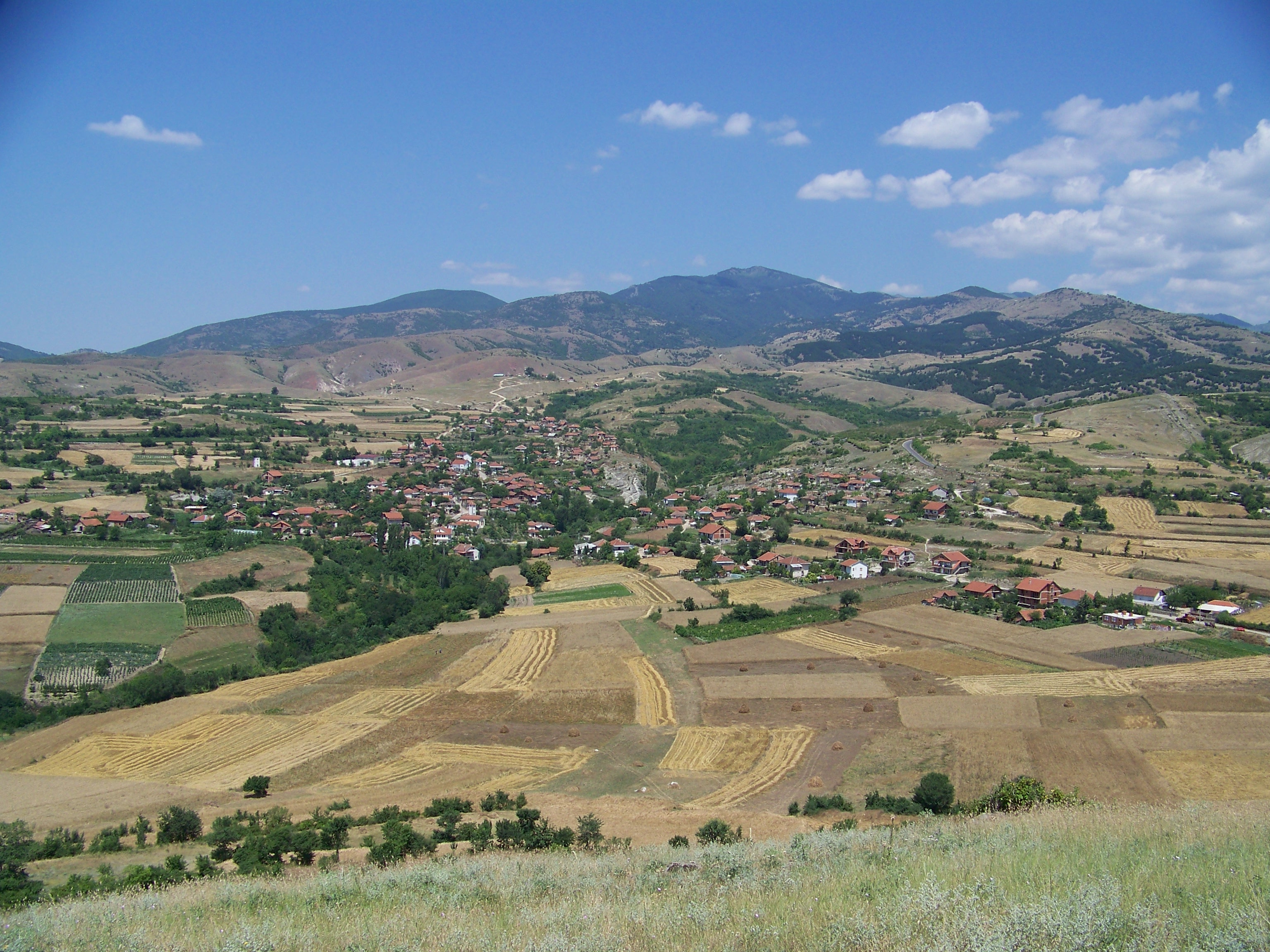
- View of the village

- Location within North Macedonia
- Coordinates: 41°55′39″N 22°22′50″E
- Country: North Macedonia
- Region: Eastern
- Municipality: Kočani
- Elevation: 524 m (1,719 ft)

Population
  - Total: 354
- Time zone: UTC+1 (CET)
  - Summer (DST): UTC+2 (CEST)
- Postal code: 2300
- Area code: (0)33

Beli (Macedonian: Бели) is a village in the municipality of Kočani, North Macedonia, near the city of Kočani.

== Geography and location ==
The village is located foothills of the Osogov Mountains, around 2 kilometers northeast of Kočani. The village is reached via Regional Route 1309 which leads to Ponikva. The road that leads into Beli is also the same road that leads to Nivičani, Pantelej, and Rajčani.

== History ==
It is believed that the village dates from the middle of the 9th century and that it was founded by Slavs who a few decades later accepted Christianity. In the 19th century, Beli was a part of the Kočani Kaza of the Ottoman Empire.

== Demographics ==
According to the statistician Vasil Kančov, around 400 people lived in Beli around 1900. All were Bulgarians.

According to the secretary of the Bulgarian Exarchate Dimitar Mishev, Beli had 576 Bulgarian residents.

According to the national census of Macedonia in 2002, the village had 466 residents, all Macedonian.

As of 2021, the village of Beli has 354 inhabitants and the ethnic composition was the following:

- Macedonians – 342
- Person without Data - 12

The table below shows the population in each census year:

Year	1900	1905	1948	1953	1961	1971	1981	1991	1994	2002
Population	400	576	706	778	846	726	486	467	454	466
