= Mojanci, Kočani =

Mojanci Мојанци
- Village
- Location within North Macedonia
- Coordinates: 41.873650°N 22.382424°E
- Country: North Macedonia
- Region: Eastern
- Municipality: Kočani

Population (2002)
  - Total: 556
- Time zone: UTC+1 (CET)
  - Summer (DST): UTC+2 (CEST)
- Website: .

Mojanci (Macedonian: Мојанци) is a village in the municipality of Kočani, North Macedonia.

== Demographics ==
According to the 2002 census, the village had a total of 556 inhabitants. Ethnic groups in the village include:

- Macedonians 554
- Others 2

As of 2021, the village of Mojanci has 385 inhabitants and the ethnic composition was the following:

- Macedonians – 361
- Person without Data - 24
