= Dragobrašte =

Dragobrashte
- Village
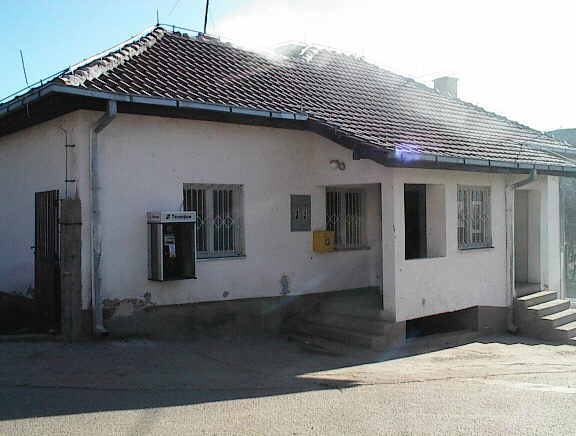
- Поштата

- Location within North Macedonia
- Coordinates: 41°53′50″N 22°35′58″E
- Country: North Macedonia
- Region: Eastern
- Municipality: Vinica

Population (2002)
  - Total: 392
- Time zone: UTC+1 (CET)
  - Summer (DST): UTC+2 (CEST)

Dragobrašte (Macedonian: Драгобраште) is a village in the Vinica region of the North Macedonia. The population engages primarily in agriculture, particularly the cultivation of tobacco.

== Demographics ==
According to the 2002 census, the village had a total of 392 inhabitants. Ethnic groups in the village include:

- Macedonians 392
