= Kostin Dol, Kočani =

Kostin Dol Костин Дол
- Village
- Location within North Macedonia
- Coordinates: 42.022789°N 22.446528°E
- Country: North Macedonia
- Region: Eastern
- Municipality: Kočani

Population (2002)
  - Total: 20
- Time zone: UTC+1 (CET)
  - Summer (DST): UTC+2 (CEST)
- Website: .

Kostin Dol (Macedonian: Костин Дол) is a village in the municipality of Kočani, North Macedonia.

== History ==
Toponyms stemming from the name Arnaut, an Ottoman rendering for Albanians, have been found in the village, such as Arnautska Kuќа, the name of a field and Arnautska Žižnica, ruins of an old settlement. This suggests either direct linguistic contact with Albanians or the former presence of an assimilated Albanian community.

== Demographics ==
According to the 2002 census, the village had a total of 20 inhabitants. Ethnic groups in the village include:

- Macedonians 20
