= Vinička Kršla =

Vinička Kršla Виничка Кршла
- Village
- Location within North Macedonia
- Coordinates: 41.899079°N 22.550715°E
- Country: North Macedonia
- Region: Eastern
- Municipality: Vinica

Population (2002)
  - Total: 99
- Time zone: UTC+1 (CET)
  - Summer (DST): UTC+2 (CEST)
- Website: .

Vinička Kršla (Macedonian: Виничка Кршла) is a village in the municipality of Vinica, North Macedonia.

The village is located on the eastern edge of the Kochansko polje, a fertile valley built by the river Bregalnica. The village is 15 km east of the nearest town, Kochana. The settlement is laid at approximately 460 meters above sea level. The Golak Mountains rise east of the settlement.

The main climate is continental.

== Demographics ==
According to the 2002 census, the village had a total of 99 inhabitants. Ethnic groups in the village include:

- Macedonians 99
