= Orizari, Kočani =

Orizari Оризари
- Village
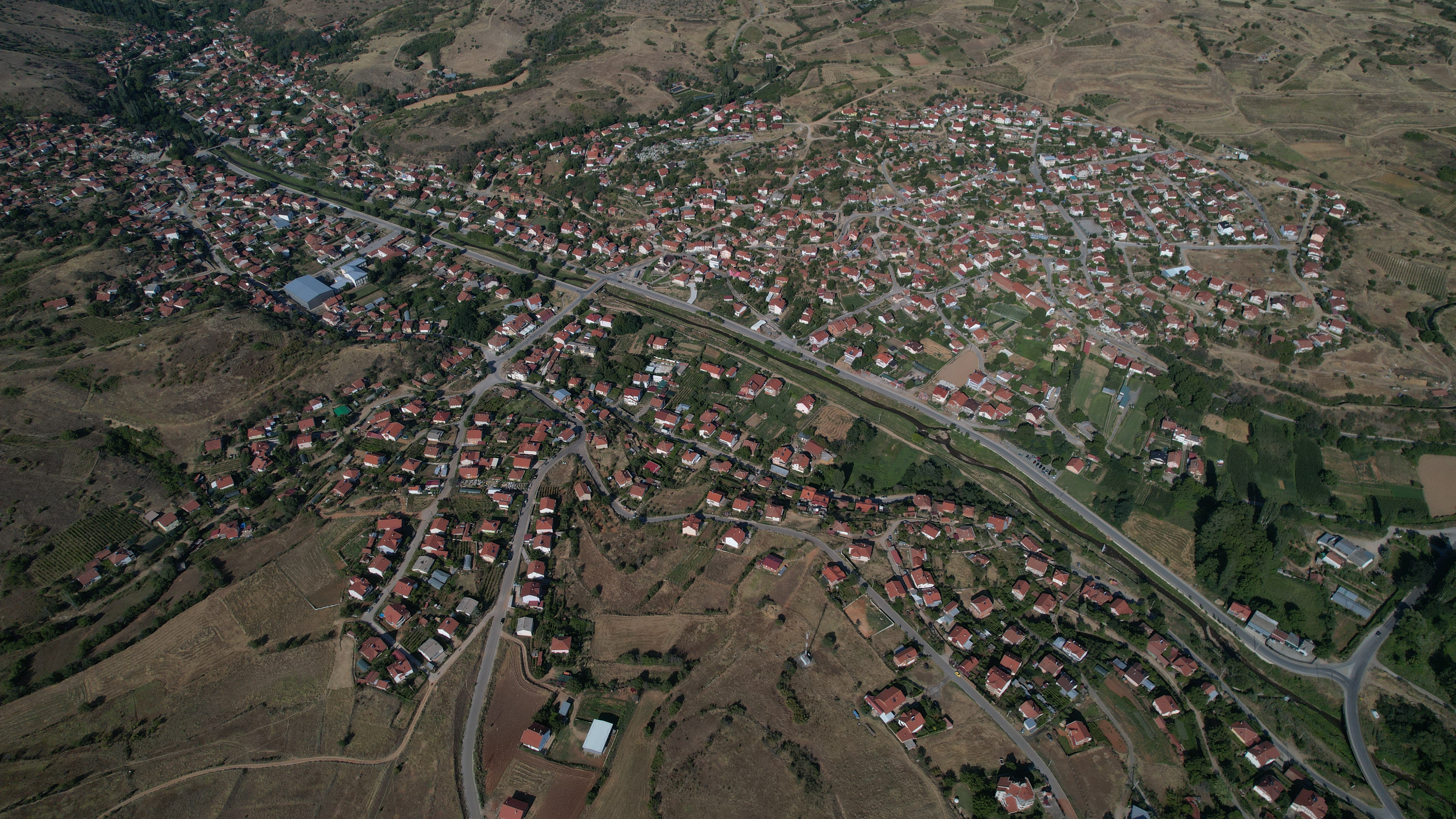
- Air view of the village

- Location within North Macedonia
- Coordinates: 41.922199°N 22.447097°E
- Country: North Macedonia
- Region: Eastern
- Municipality: Kočani

Population (2002)
  - Total: 3,776
- Time zone: UTC+1 (CET)
  - Summer (DST): UTC+2 (CEST)
- Website: .

Orizari (Macedonian: Оризари) is a village in the municipality of Kočani, North Macedonia. It used to be a municipality of its own. The name of the school in Orizari is Krste Petkov Misirkov.

== Demographics ==
According to the 2002 census, the village had a total of 3,776 inhabitants. Ethnic groups in the village include:

- Macedonians 3,768

As of 2021, the village of Orizari has 2.737 inhabitants and the ethnic composition was the following:

- Macedonians – 2.564
- Aromanian – 1
- others – 8
- Person without Data - 164
