= Teranci =

Teranci Teranci
- Village
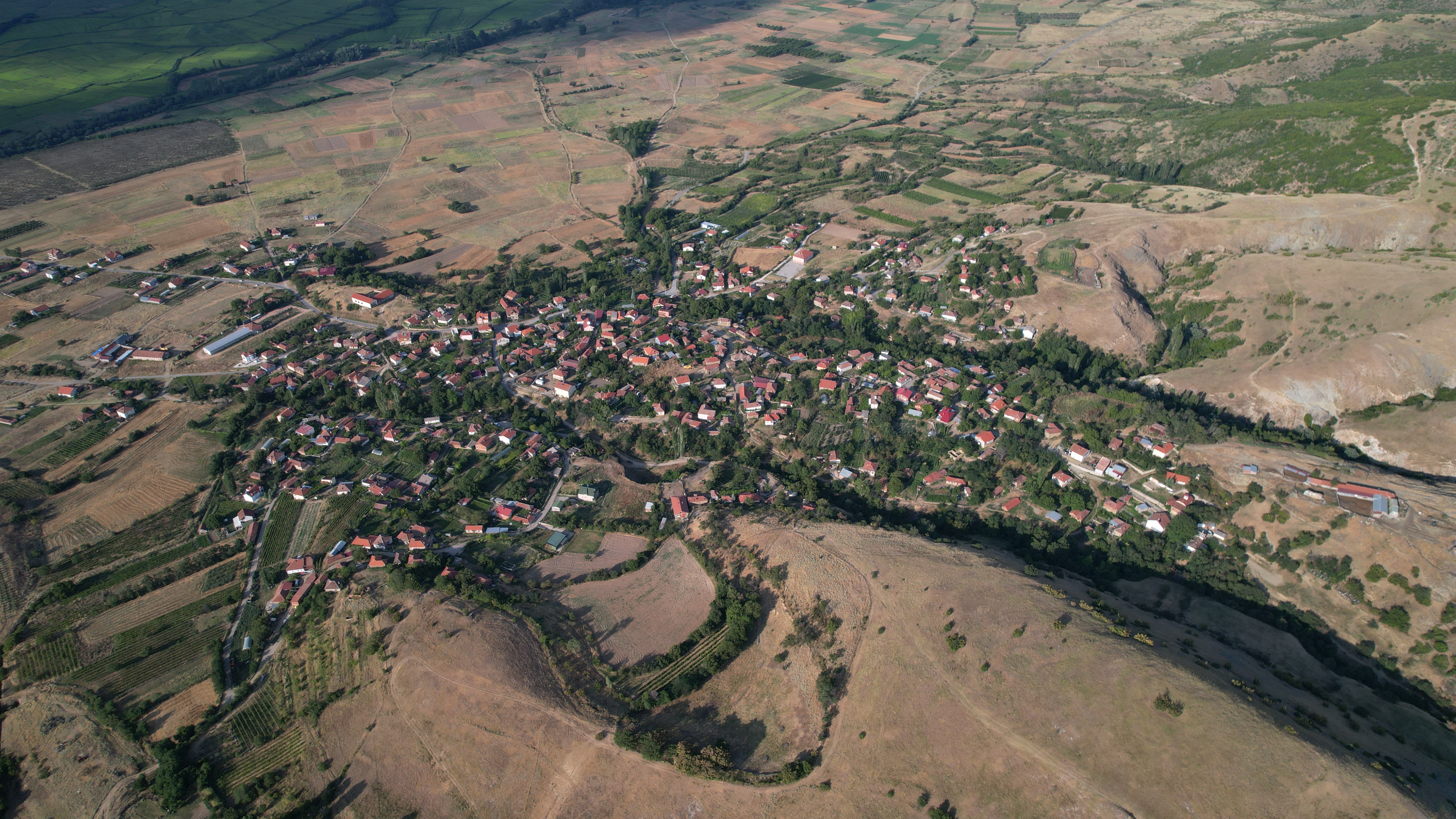
- Air view of the village

- Location within North Macedonia
- Coordinates: 41.850446°N 22.355656°E
- Country: North Macedonia
- Region: Eastern
- Municipality: Češinovo-Obleševo

Population (2002)
  - Total: 738
- Time zone: UTC+1 (CET)
  - Summer (DST): UTC+2 (CEST)
- Website: .

Teranci (Macedonian: Teranci) is a village in the municipality of Češinovo-Obleševo, North Macedonia. It used to be part of the former municipality of Obleševo.

== History ==
Teranci has two archaeological sites: Gradište, from late antiquity, and Teranci, from the Roman-era.

One of the neighborhoods of the village bears the name Arbanaško Maalo, meaning Albanian neighborhood, which suggests either direct linguistic contact with Albanians or the former presence of an assimilated Albanian community.

Per Vasil Kanchov, Teranci was composed of 375 Muslim Turks and 20 Bulgarian Christians in 1900. In 1905, Dimitar Mishev recorded 32 Bulgarian Exarchists.

== Demographics ==
According to the 2002 census, the village had a total of 738 inhabitants. Ethnic groups in the village include:

- Macedonians 738
