= Pribačevo =

Pribačevo Прибачево
- Village
- Location within North Macedonia
- Coordinates: 41.886501°N 22.443760°E
- Country: North Macedonia
- Region: Eastern
- Municipality: Kočani

Population (2021)
  - Total: 280
- Time zone: UTC+1 (CET)
  - Summer (DST): UTC+2 (CEST)
- Website: .

Pribačevo (Macedonian: Прибачево) is a village in the municipality of Kočani, North Macedonia. It used to be part of the former municipality of Orizari.

== Demographics ==
According to the 2002 census, the village had a total of 388 inhabitants. Ethnic groups in the village include:

- Macedonians 388

As of 2021, the village of Pribachevo has 280 inhabitants and the ethnic composition was the following:

- Macedonians – 270
- Person without Data - 10
