= Obleševo, North Macedonia =

Obleševo Облешево
- Village
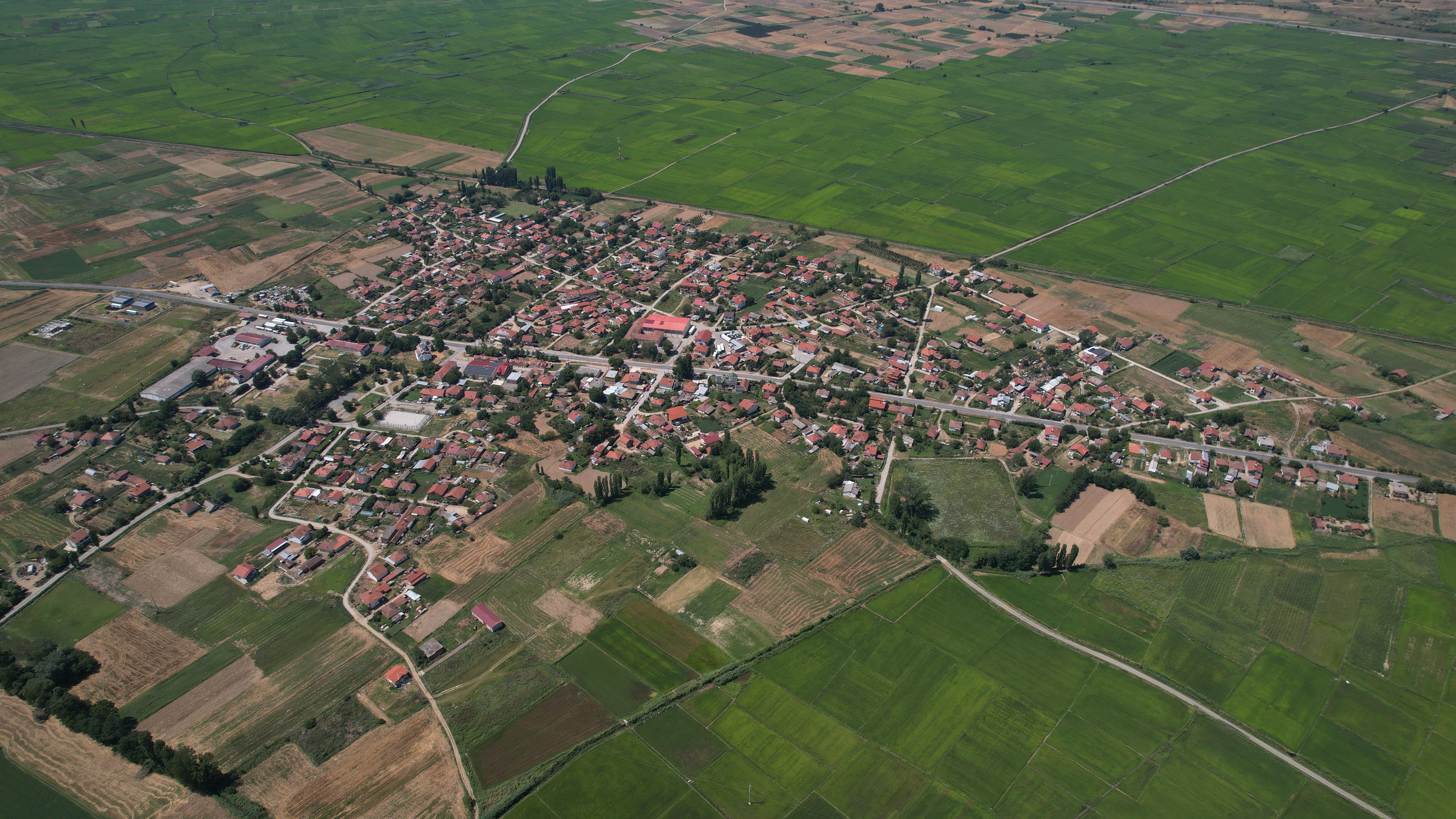
- Air view of the village

- Location within North Macedonia
- Coordinates: 41.883247°N 22.334308°E
- Country: North Macedonia
- Region: Eastern
- Municipality: Češinovo-Obleševo

Population (2002)
  - Total: 1,131
- Time zone: UTC+1 (CET)
  - Summer (DST): UTC+2 (CEST)
- Car plates: KO
- Website: .

Obleševo (Macedonian: Облешево) is a village in the municipality of Češinovo-Obleševo, North Macedonia. It used to be a municipality of its own.

== Demographics ==
According to the 2002 census, the village had a total of 1,131 inhabitants. Ethnic groups in the village include:

- Macedonians 1,129
- Serbs 1
- Others 1
