= Burilčevo =

Burilčevo Бурилчево
- Village
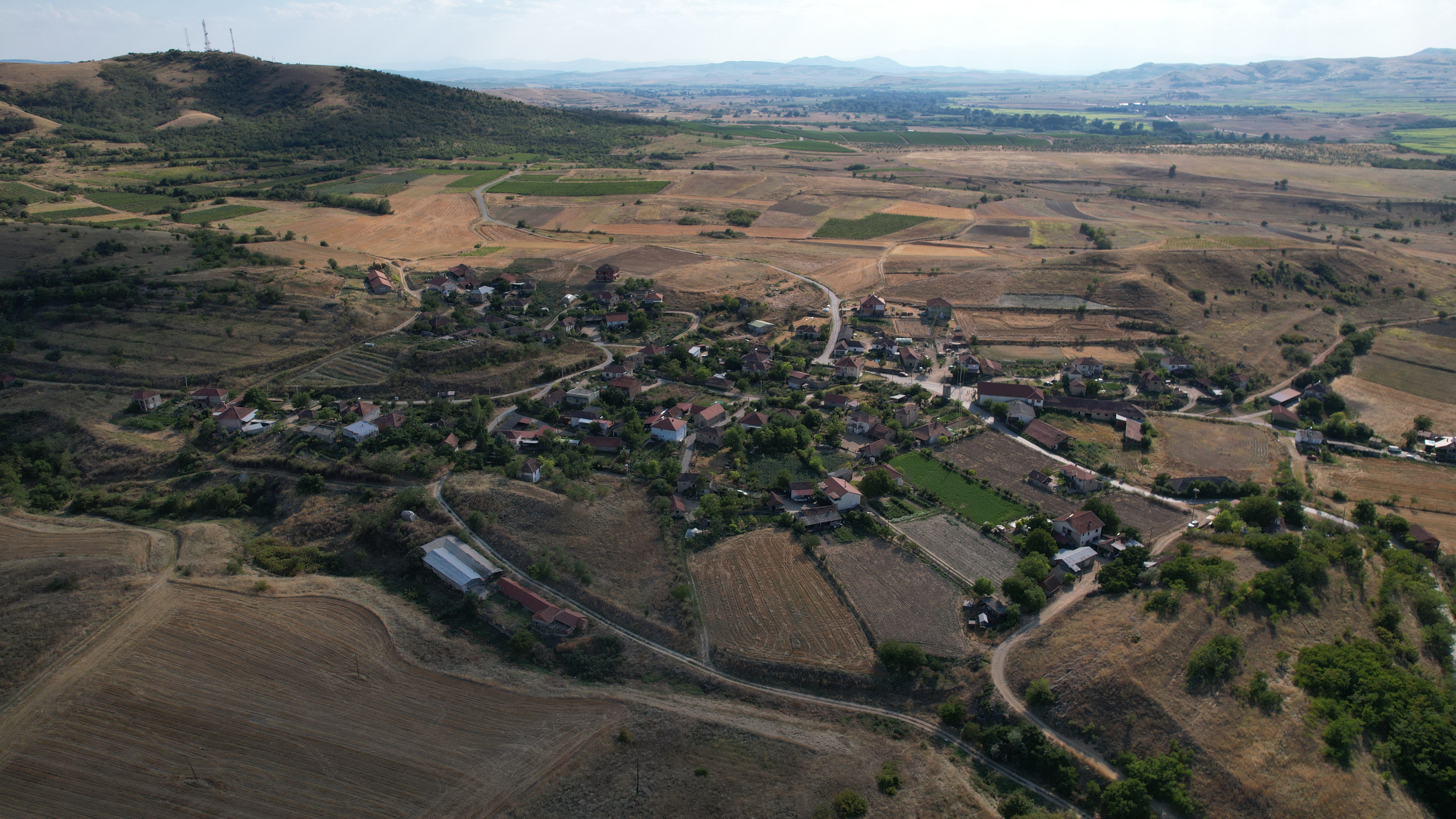

- Location within North Macedonia
- Coordinates: 41.841747°N 22.296960°E
- Country: North Macedonia
- Region: Eastern
- Municipality: Češinovo-Obleševo

Population (2002)
  - Total: 173
- Time zone: UTC+1 (CET)
  - Summer (DST): UTC+2 (CEST)
- Website: .

Burilčevo (Macedonian: Бурилчево) is a village in the municipality of Češinovo-Obleševo, North Macedonia. It used to be part of the former municipality of Obleševo.

== Demographics ==
According to the 2002 census, the village had a total of 173 inhabitants. Ethnic groups in the village include:

- Macedonians 173
