= Ularci =

Ularci Уларци
- Village
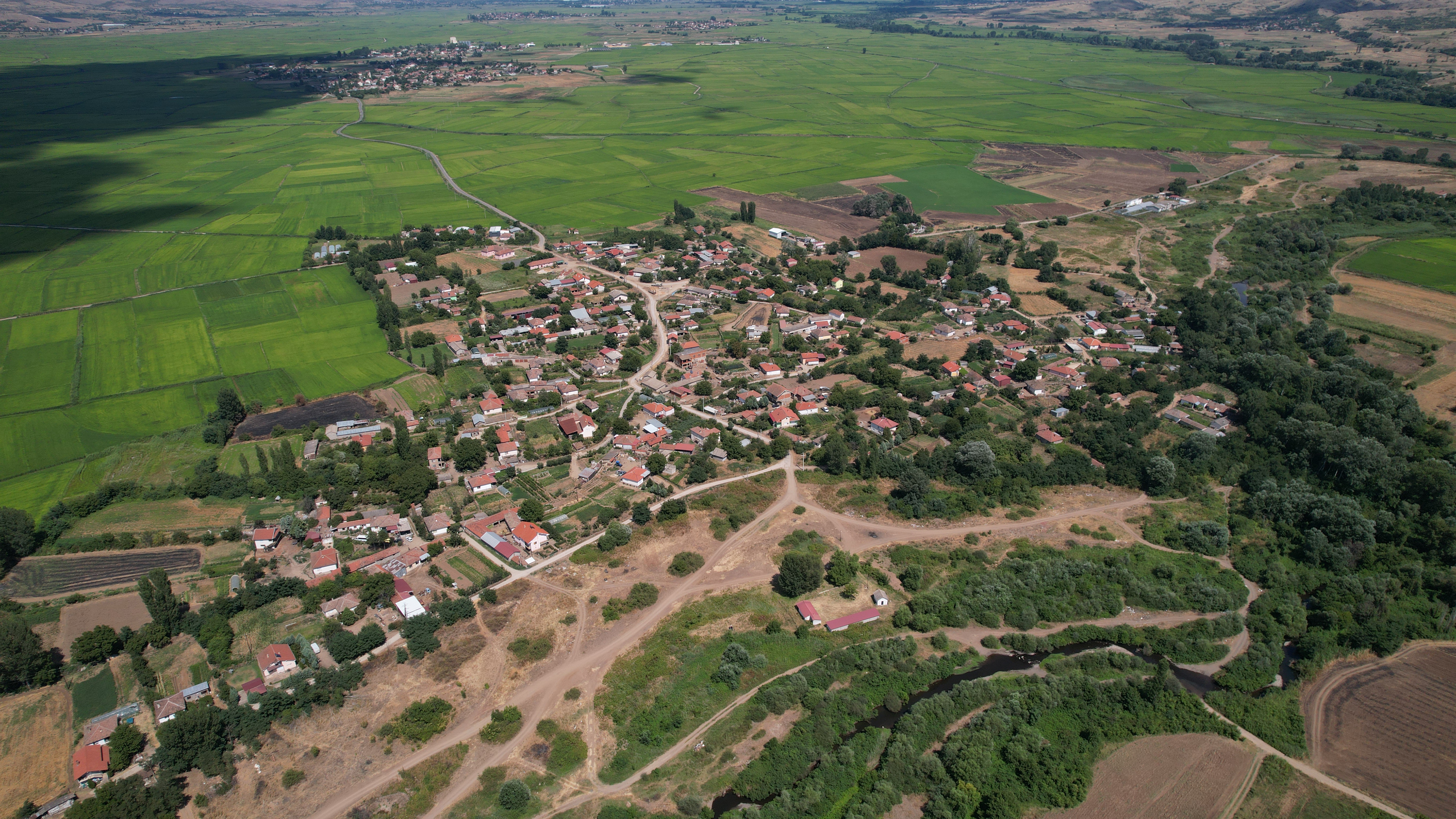
- Air view of the village

- Location within North Macedonia
- Coordinates: 41.858986°N 22.263704°E
- Country: North Macedonia
- Region: Eastern
- Municipality: Češinovo-Obleševo

Population (2002)
  - Total: 366
- Time zone: UTC+1 (CET)
  - Summer (DST): UTC+2 (CEST)
- Website: .

Ularci (Macedonian: Уларци) is a village in the municipality of Češinovo-Obleševo, North Macedonia. It used to be part of the former municipality of Obleševo.

== Demographics ==
According to the 2002 census, the village had a total of 366 inhabitants. Ethnic groups in the village include:

- Macedonians 366
