= Nivičani =

Nivičani Нивичани
- Village
- Location within North Macedonia
- Coordinates: 41.955134°N 22.337303°E
- Country: North Macedonia
- Region: Eastern
- Municipality: Kočani

Population (2021)
  - Total: 233
- Time zone: UTC+1 (CET)
  - Summer (DST): UTC+2 (CEST)
- Website: .

Nivičani (Macedonian: Нивичани) is a village in the municipality of Kočani, North Macedonia.

== Demographics ==
According to the 2002 census, the village had a total of 343 inhabitants. Ethnic groups in the village include:

- Macedonians 343

As of 2021, the village of Nivichani has 233 inhabitants and the ethnic composition was the following:

- Macedonians – 217

Albanians – 2

- Person without Data - 14
