= Trkanje =

Trkanje Тркање
- Village
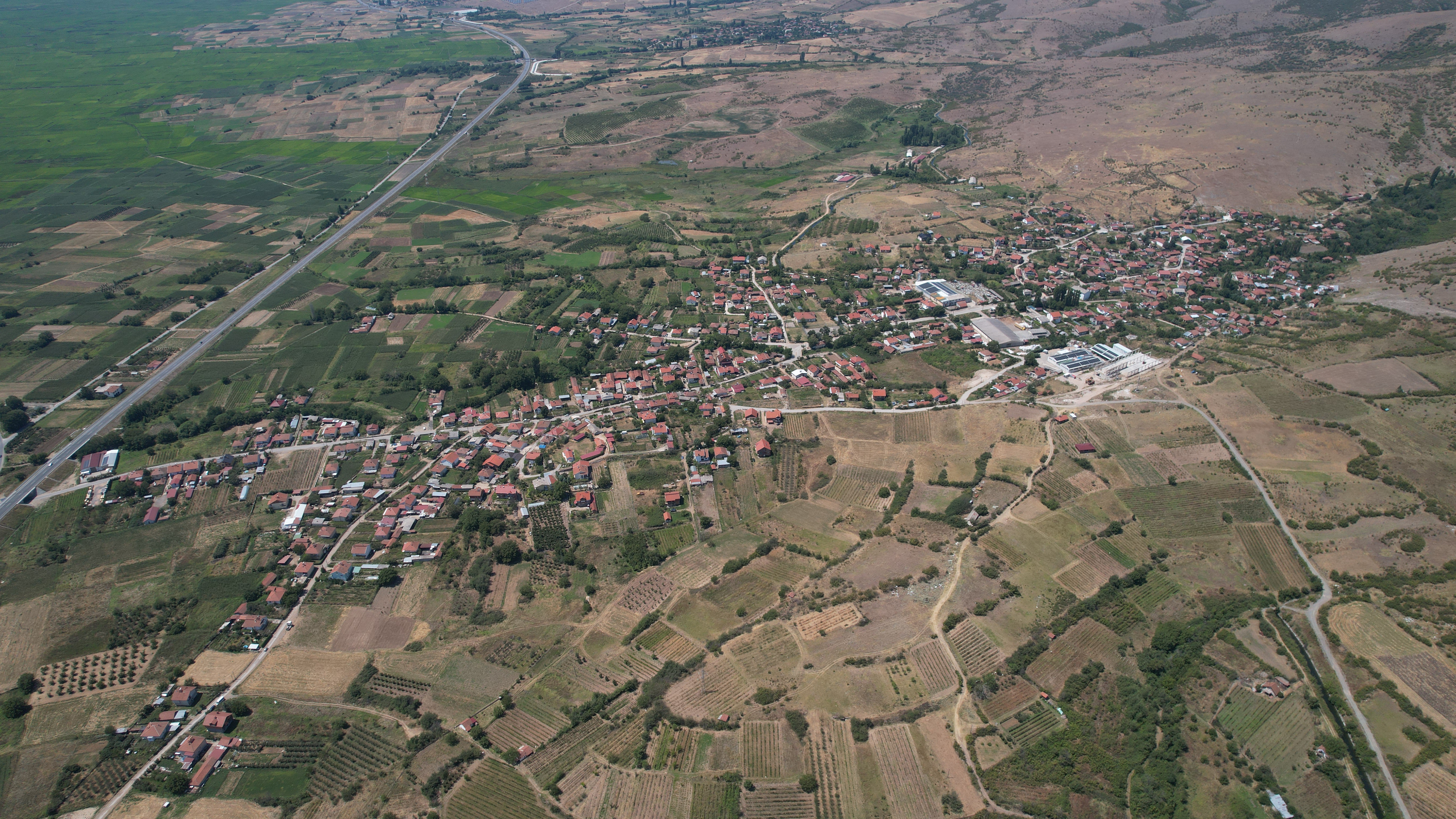
- Air view of the village

- Location within North Macedonia
- Coordinates: 41.904017°N 22.363036°E
- Country: North Macedonia
- Region: Eastern
- Municipality: Kočani

Population (2021)
  - Total: 1,001
- Time zone: UTC+1 (CET)
  - Summer (DST): UTC+2 (CEST)
- Website: .

Trkanje (Macedonian: Тркање) is a village in the municipality of Kočani, North Macedonia.

== Demographics ==
According to the 2002 census, the village had a total of 1,225 inhabitants. Ethnic groups in the village include:

- Macedonians 1,224
- Serbs 1

As of 2021, the village of Trkanje has 1.001 inhabitants and the ethnic composition was the following:

- Macedonians – 963
- others – 5
- Person without Data - 33
