= Gorni Podlog =

Gorni Podlog Горни Подлог
- Village
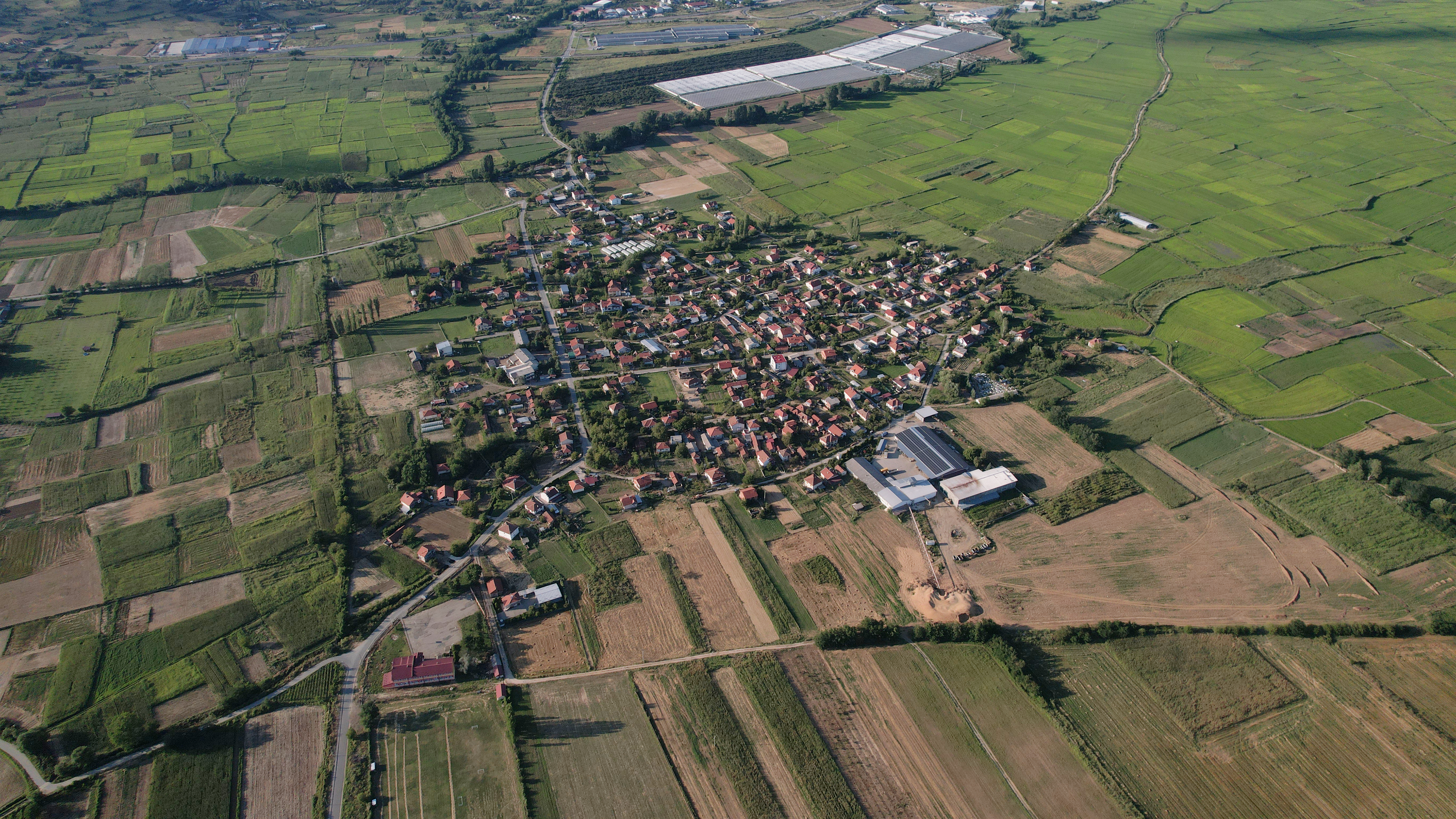
- Air view of the village

- Location within North Macedonia
- Coordinates: 41.887454°N 22.381824°E
- Country: North Macedonia
- Region: Eastern
- Municipality: Kočani

Population (2021)
  - Total: 571
- Time zone: UTC+1 (CET)
  - Summer (DST): UTC+2 (CEST)
- Website: .

Gorni Podlog (Macedonian: Горни Подлог) is a village in the municipality of Kočani, North Macedonia.

== Demographics ==
According to the 2002 census, the village had a total of 704 inhabitants. Ethnic groups in the village include:

- Macedonians 702
- Serbs 1
- Bosniaks 1

As of 2021, the village of Gorni Podlog has 571 inhabitants and the ethnic composition is the following:

- Macedonians – 538
- Bosniaks – 2
- others – 4
- Person without Data - 27
