= Istibanja =

Istibanja Истибања
- Village
- Location within North Macedonia
- Coordinates: 41.930231°N 22.501017°E
- Country: North Macedonia
- Region: Eastern
- Municipality: Vinica

Population (2002)
  - Total: 1,476
- Time zone: UTC+1 (CET)
  - Summer (DST): UTC+2 (CEST)
- Website: .

Istibanja (Macedonian: Истибања) is a village in the municipality of Vinica, North Macedonia.

== Demographics ==
According to the 2002 census, the village had a total of 1,476 inhabitants. Ethnic groups in the village include:

- Macedonians 1,475
- Serbs 1
