= Polaki, Kočani =

Polaki Полаки
- Village
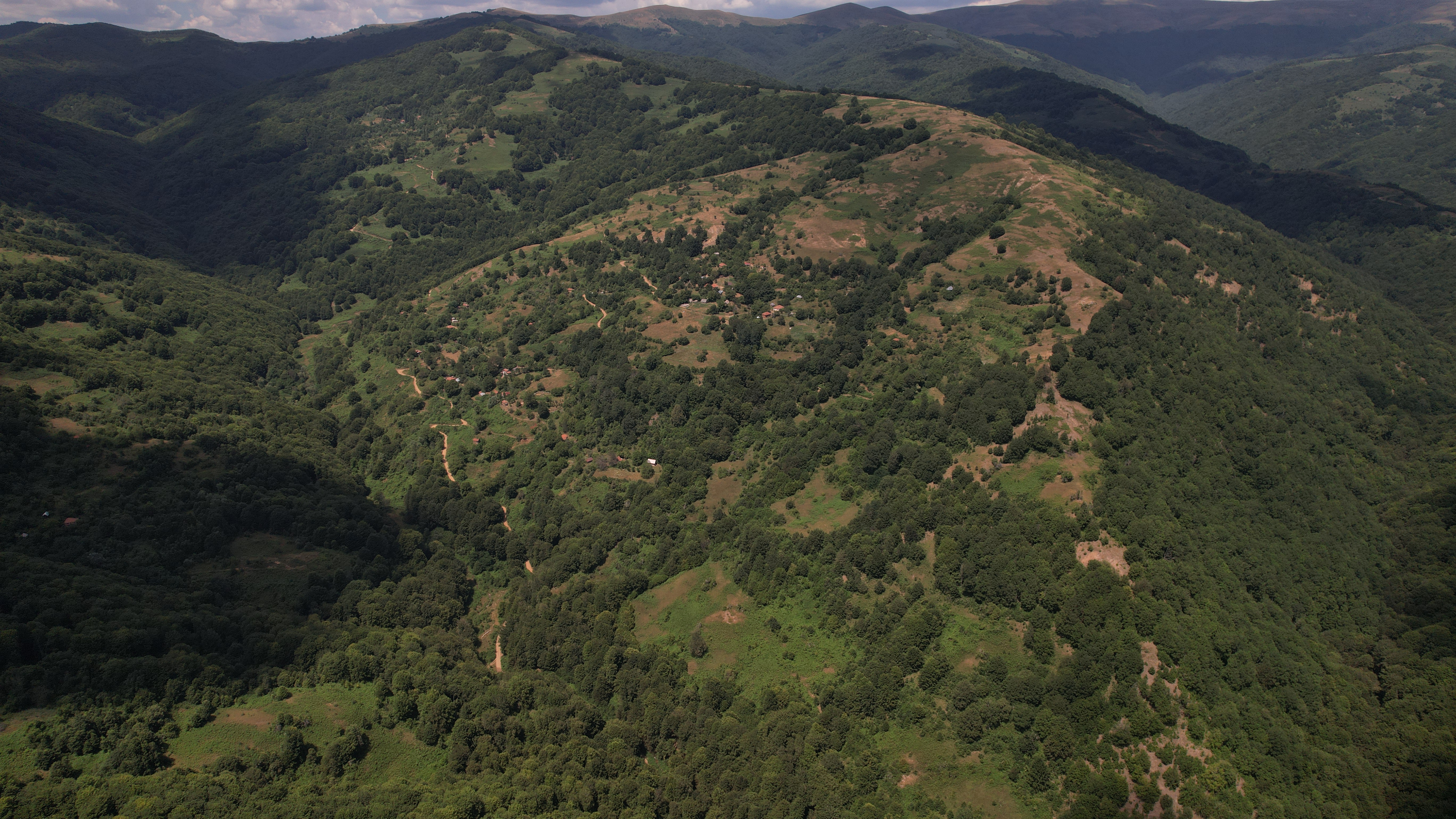
- Air view of the village Polaki

- Location within North Macedonia
- Country: North Macedonia
- Region: Eastern
- Municipality: Kočani

Population (2002)
  - Total: 113
- Time zone: UTC+1 (CET)
  - Summer (DST): UTC+2 (CEST)
- Website: .

Polaki (Macedonian: Полаки) is a village in the municipality of Kočani, North Macedonia.

== Demographics ==
According to the 2002 census, the village had a total of 113 inhabitants. Ethnic groups in the village include:

- Macedonians 113
