= Banja, North Macedonia =

Banja Бања
- Village
- Location within North Macedonia
- Coordinates: 41.911300°N 22.333532°E
- Country: North Macedonia
- Region: Eastern
- Municipality: Češinovo-Obleševo

Population (2002)
  - Total: 402
- Time zone: UTC+1 (CET)
  - Summer (DST): UTC+2 (CEST)
- Website: .

Banja (Macedonian: Бања) is a village in the municipality of Češinovo-Obleševo, North Macedonia. It used to be part of the former municipality of Obleševo.

== Demographics ==
According to the 2002 census, the village had a total of 402 inhabitants. Ethnic groups in the village include:

- Macedonians 393
- Aromanians 9
