= Češinovo-Obleševo Municipality =

Municipality of North Macedonia

Coordinates: 41.90°N 22.33°E

Municipality of Češinovo-Obleševo Општина Чешиново-Облешево
- Rural municipality
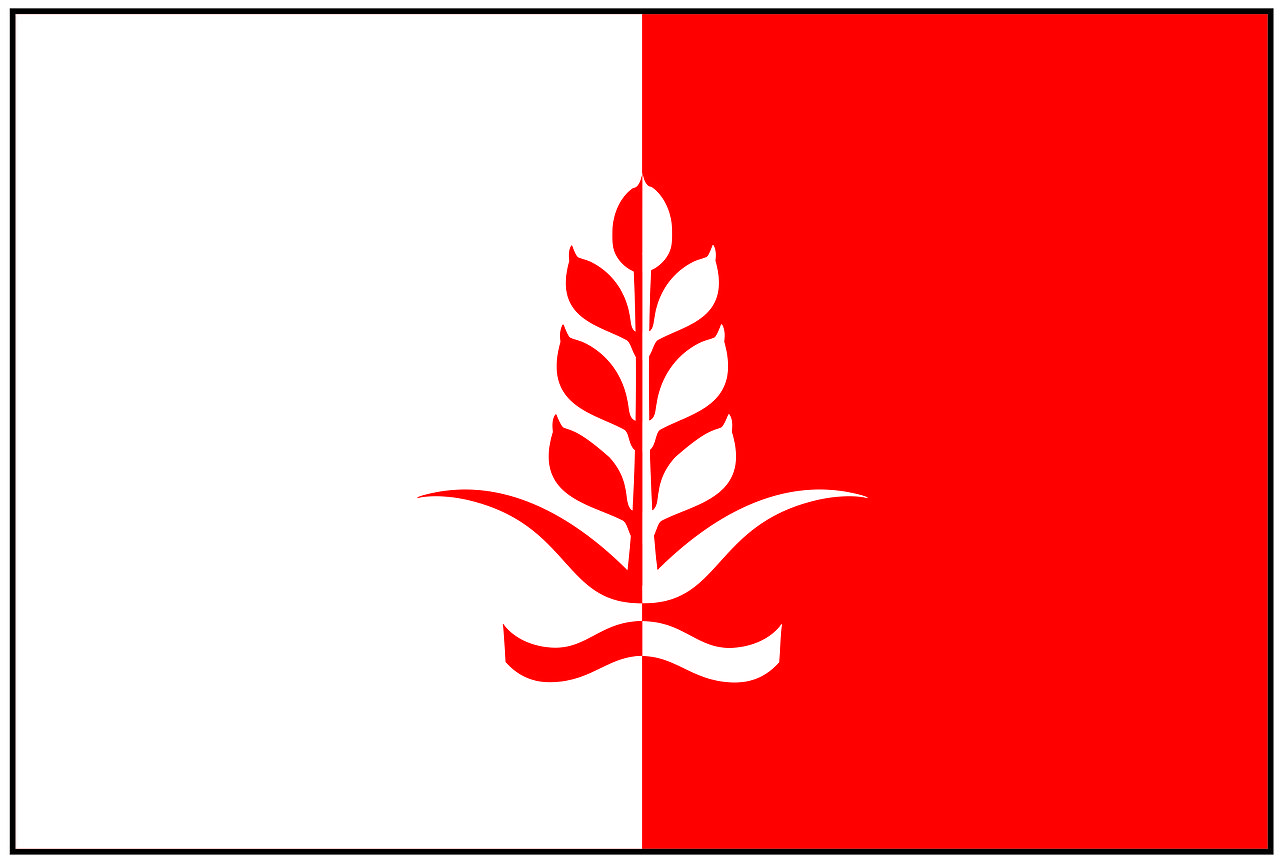
- Flag

- Country: North Macedonia
- Region: Eastern
- Municipal seat: Obleševo

Government
  - Mayor: Dalibor Angelov (VMRO-DPMNE)

Area
  - Total: 132.2 km^{2} (51.0 sq mi)

Population
  - Total: 5,471
  - Density: 41.38/km^{2} (107.2/sq mi)
- Time zone: UTC+1 (CET)
- Postal code: 2301
- Area code: 033
- Vehicle registration: KO
- Website: http://cesinovo-oblesevo.gov.mk

Češinovo-Obleševo (Macedonian: Чешиново-Облешево) is a municipality in the eastern part of North Macedonia. The seat of the municipality is the village of Obleševo. Češinovo-Obleševo is part of the Eastern Statistical Region.

== Geography ==
The municipality borders the Municipality of Kočani and Municipality of Zrnovci to the east and the Municipality of Probištip and the Municipality of Karbinci to the west.

== History ==
By the 2003 territorial division of Macedonia, the Češinovo Municipality was attached to the Obleševo Municipality, forming the new municipality named Češinovo-Obleševo.

== Demographics ==
According to the 2002 Macedonian census, there are 7,490 people in the Municipality of Češinovo-Obleševo. According to the 2021 North Macedonia census, this municipality has 5,471 inhabitants. Ethnic groups in the municipality:

	2002		2021	
	Number	%	Number	%
TOTAL	7,490	100	5,471	100
Macedonians	7,455	99.53	5,231	95.61
Vlachs	30	0.4	8	0.15
Albanians			7	0.14
Serbs	4	0.06	1	0.01
Others / Undeclared / Unknown	1	0.01	1	0.01
Persons for whom data are taken from administrative sources			223	4.08

	Demographics of the Municipality of Cheshinovo-Obleshevo
Census year	Population	Territorial Division 2003
1994	5,356
		7,490
2002	5,071
2021	5,471

Demographics of the former Municipality of Cheshinovo
Census year	Population
1994	2,540
2002	2,419

== Inhabited places ==
The number of inhabited places in the municipality is 14.

Inhabited places in the Češinovo-Obleševo Municipality
Village(s): Banja | Burilčevo | Češinovo | Čiflik | Kučičino | Lepopelci | Novo Selani | Obleševo | Sokolarci | Spančevo | Teranci | Ularci | Vrbica | Žiganci |
