= Rajčani =

Rajčani Рајчани
- Village
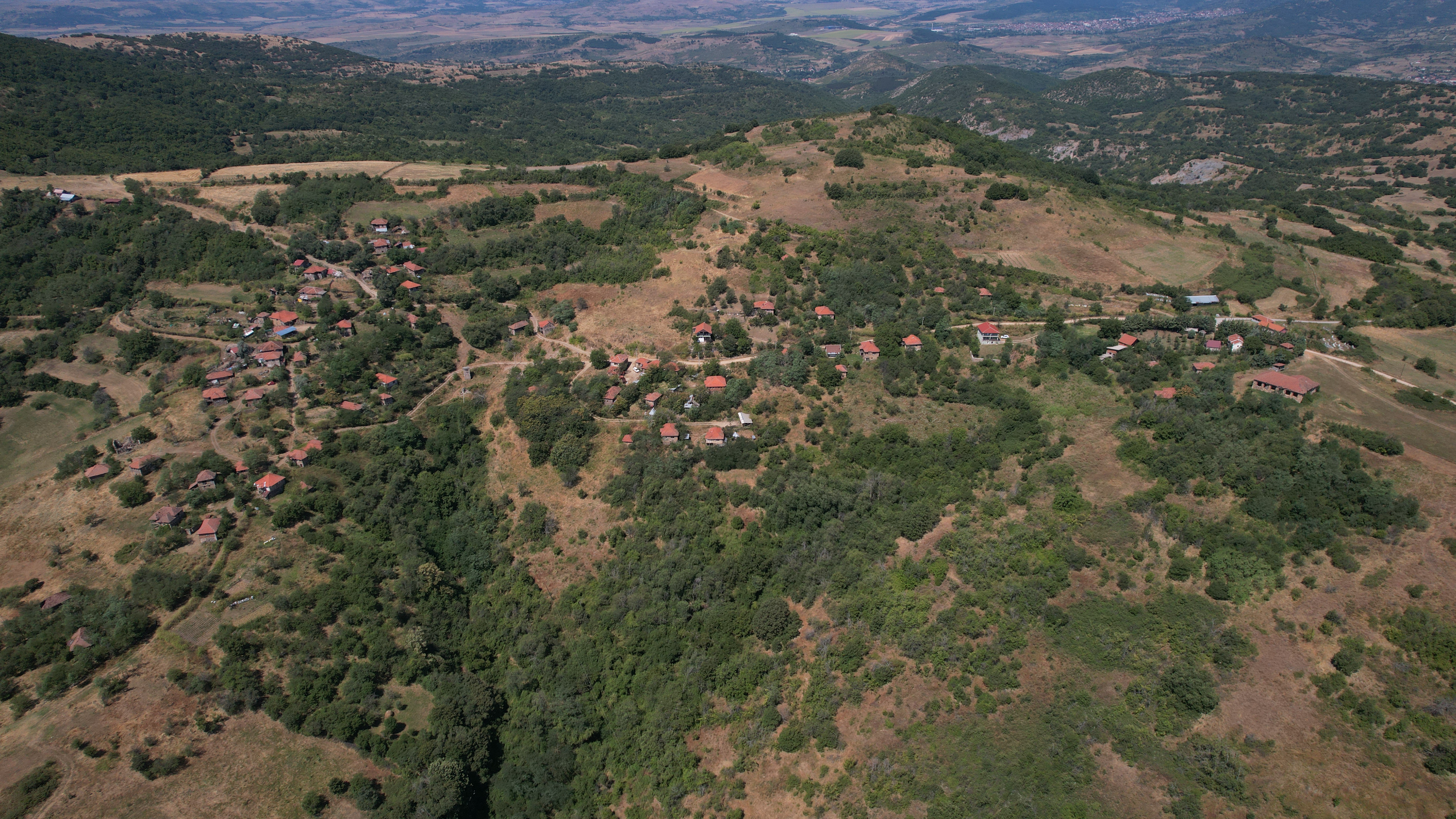

- Location in North Macedonia
- Country: North Macedonia
- Region: Eastern
- Municipality: Kočani
- Elevation: 700 m (2,300 ft)

Population (2021)
  - Total: 9
- Time zone: UTC+1 (CET)
  - Summer (DST): UTC+2 (CEST)

Rajčani (Macedonian: Рајчани) is a village in the Kočani region of North Macedonia.

== Etymology ==
The name of the village is first mentioned in the 14th century, specifically in 1347 in the charter of Stefan Dušan for the Zletovo Bishopric as Раичаномь, meaning "heaven".

== Geography ==
The village is located in the western part of Kočani Municipality, approximately 23 kilometers from Kočani. It is mountainous, having an elevation of 700 meters above sea level.

== Demographics ==
In 1900, according to Macedonia. Ethnography and Statistics by Vasil Kanchov, the village had 91 people, all recorded as Bulgarians.

In 1905, according to La Macédoine et sa Population Chrétienne, there were 80 Bulgarians and 6 Aromanians in the village.

In the 1948 census, the population was 331, increasing to 382 in 1953. The population then declined due to emigration: 350 in 1961, 272 in 1971, 134 in 1981, 67 in 1991, 54 in 1994, 33 in 2002, and 9 in 2021, all aged over 65, comprising 5 males and 4 females.

== Historical significance ==
On 27 April 1905, near the village, in the area of Svilanovo, Macedonian Bulgarian revolutionary Nikola Karev was killed while fighting with the Ottoman forces.
