= Kočani Municipality =

Municipality of North Macedonia

Coordinates: 41.93°N 22.40°E

Municipality of Kočani Општина Кочани
- Urban municipality
- Flag Seal

- Country: North Macedonia
- Region: Eastern
- Municipal seat: Kočani

Government
  - Mayor: Venko Krstevski

Area
  - Total: 375.44 km^{2} (144.96 sq mi)

Population
  - Total: 31,602
  - Density: 84.173/km^{2} (218.01/sq mi)
- Time zone: UTC+1 (CET)
- Postal code: 2300
- Area code: 033
- Vehicle registration: KO
- ISO 3166-2: MK-42
- Website: http://www.kocani.gov.mk

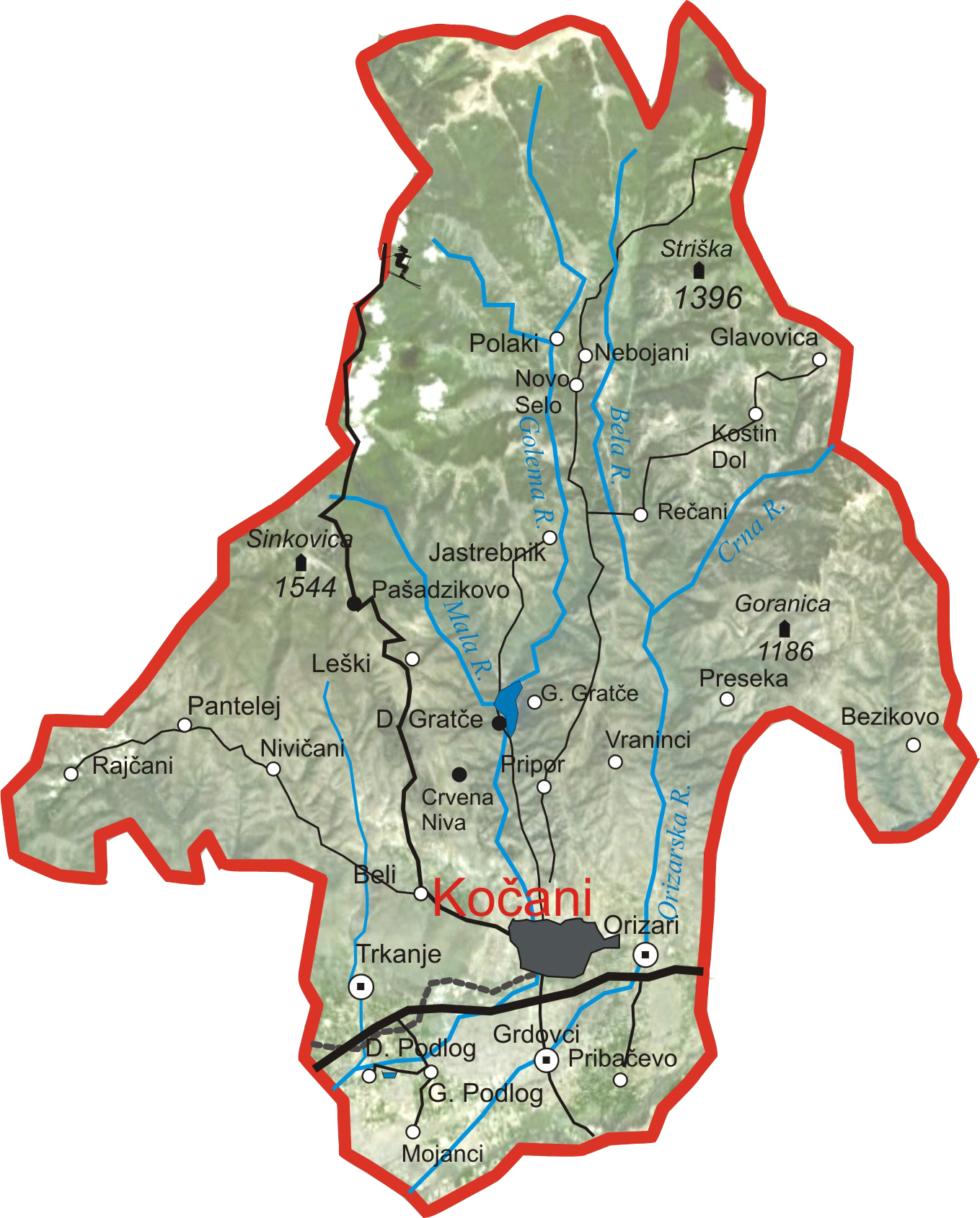
The map of Kočani Municipality

Kočani (Macedonian: Кочани [ˈkɔtʃani]) is a municipality in the eastern part of North Macedonia. Kočani is also the name of the town where the municipal seat is located. The municipality is part of the Eastern Statistical Region.

== Geography ==
The municipality borders the Kriva Palanka Municipality to the north, Kratovo Municipality and Probištip Municipality to the west, Makedonska Kamenica Municipality and Vinica Municipality to the east, and the Češinovo-Obleševo Municipality and Zrnovci Municipality to the south.

== History ==
By the 2003 territorial division of the Republic, the rural Orizari Municipality was annexed to the Kočani Municipality.

== Demographics ==
There are 31,602 residents of the Kočani Municipality, according to the 2021 North Macedonia census. Ethnic groups in the Kočani municipality:

	2002		2021	
	Number	%	Number	%
TOTAL	38,092	100	31,602	100
Macedonians	35,472	93.12	26,798	84.8
Roma	1,951	5.12	1,892	5.99
Vlachs	194	0.51	170	0.54
Turks	315	0.82	138	0.44
Serbs	67	0.175	37	0.11
Albanians	1	0.005	15	0.04
Bosniaks	2	0.01	14	0.03
Other / Undeclared / Unknown	90	0.27	139	0.46
Persons for whom data are taken from administrative sources			2,399	7.59

	Demographics of the Kočani Municipality
Census year	Population	Territorial Division 2003
1994	32,051
		38 092
2002	33,689
2021	31,602

Demographics of the former Orizari Municipality
Census year	Population
1994	4,724
2002	4,403

== Settlements ==
Inhabited places in the Kočani Municipality
Villages: Bezikovo (Безиково) | Beli (Бели) | Vraninci (Вранинци) | Gorni Podlog (Горни Подлог) | Gorno Gradče (Горно Градче) | Glavovica (Главовица) | Grdovci (Грдовци) | Dolni Podlog (Долни Подлог) | Dolno Gradče (Долно Градче) | Jastrebnik (Јастребник) | Kostin Dol (Костин Дол) | Leški (Лешки) | Mojanci Selo (Мојанци) | Nebojanci (Небојани) | Nivičani (Нивичани) | Novo Selo (Ново Село) | Orizari (Оризари) | Pantelej (Пантелеј) | Pašaďikovo (Пашаџиково) | Polaki (Полаки) | Preseka (Пресека) | Pribačevo (Прибачево) | Pripor (Припор) | Rajčani (Рајчани) | Rečani (Речани) | Trkanje (Тркање) | Crvena Niva (Црвена Нива) | Town: Kočani (Кочани)
