= Dolni Podlog =

Dolni Podlog Долни Подлог
- Village
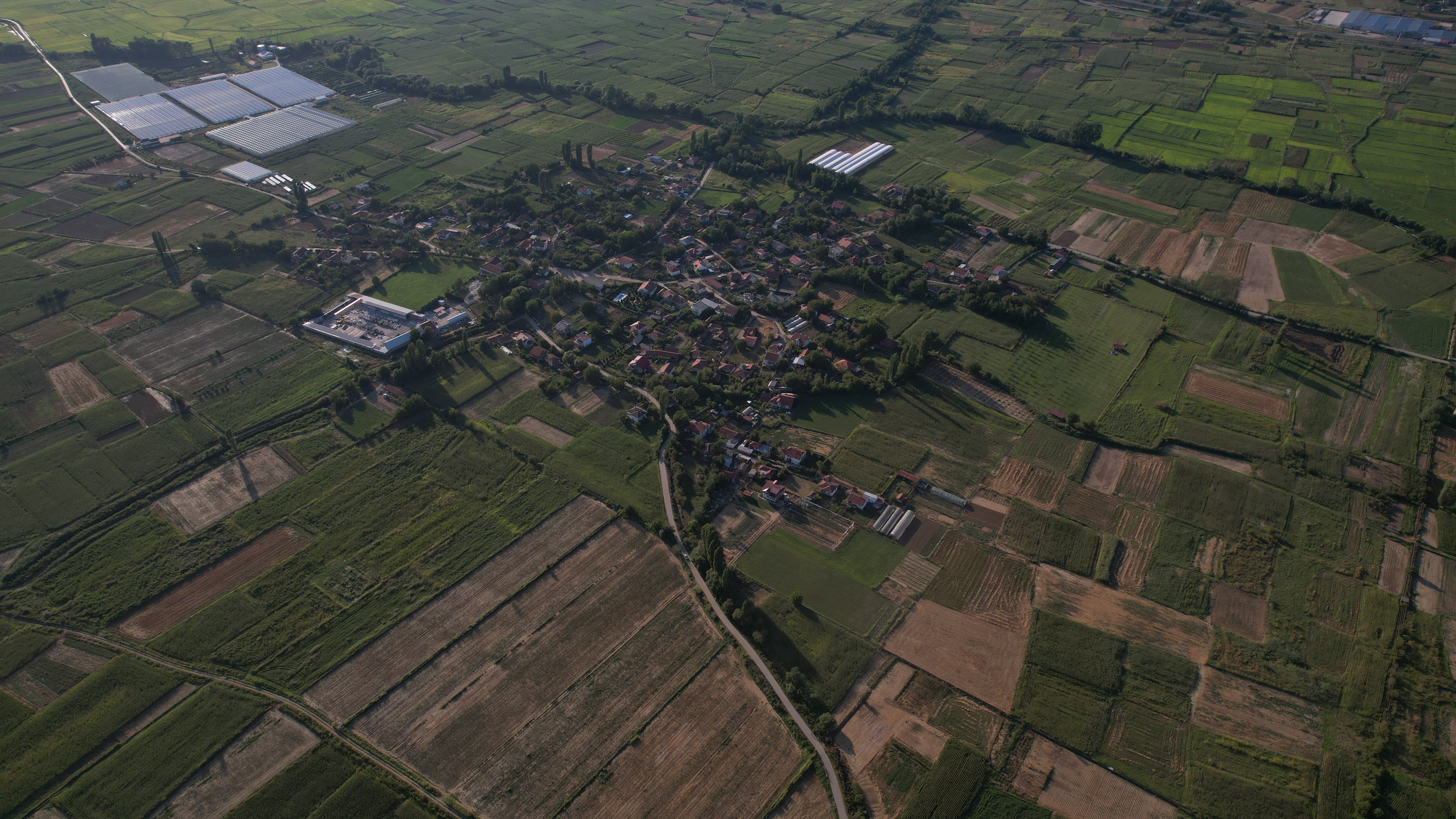
- Air view of the village

- Location within North Macedonia
- Coordinates: 41.887351°N 22.369537°E
- Country: North Macedonia
- Region: Eastern
- Municipality: Kočani

Population (2002)
  - Total: 476
- Time zone: UTC+1 (CET)
  - Summer (DST): UTC+2 (CEST)
- Website: .

Dolni Podlog (Macedonian: Долни Подлог) is a village in the municipality of Kočani, North Macedonia.

== Demographics ==
According to the 2002 census, the village had a total of 476 inhabitants. Ethnic groups in the village include:

- Macedonians 476

As of 2021, the village of Dolni Podlog has 327 inhabitants and the ethnic composition was the following:

- Macedonians – 315
- others – 2
- Person without Data - 10
