= Češinovo, North Macedonia =

Češinovo Чешиново
- Village
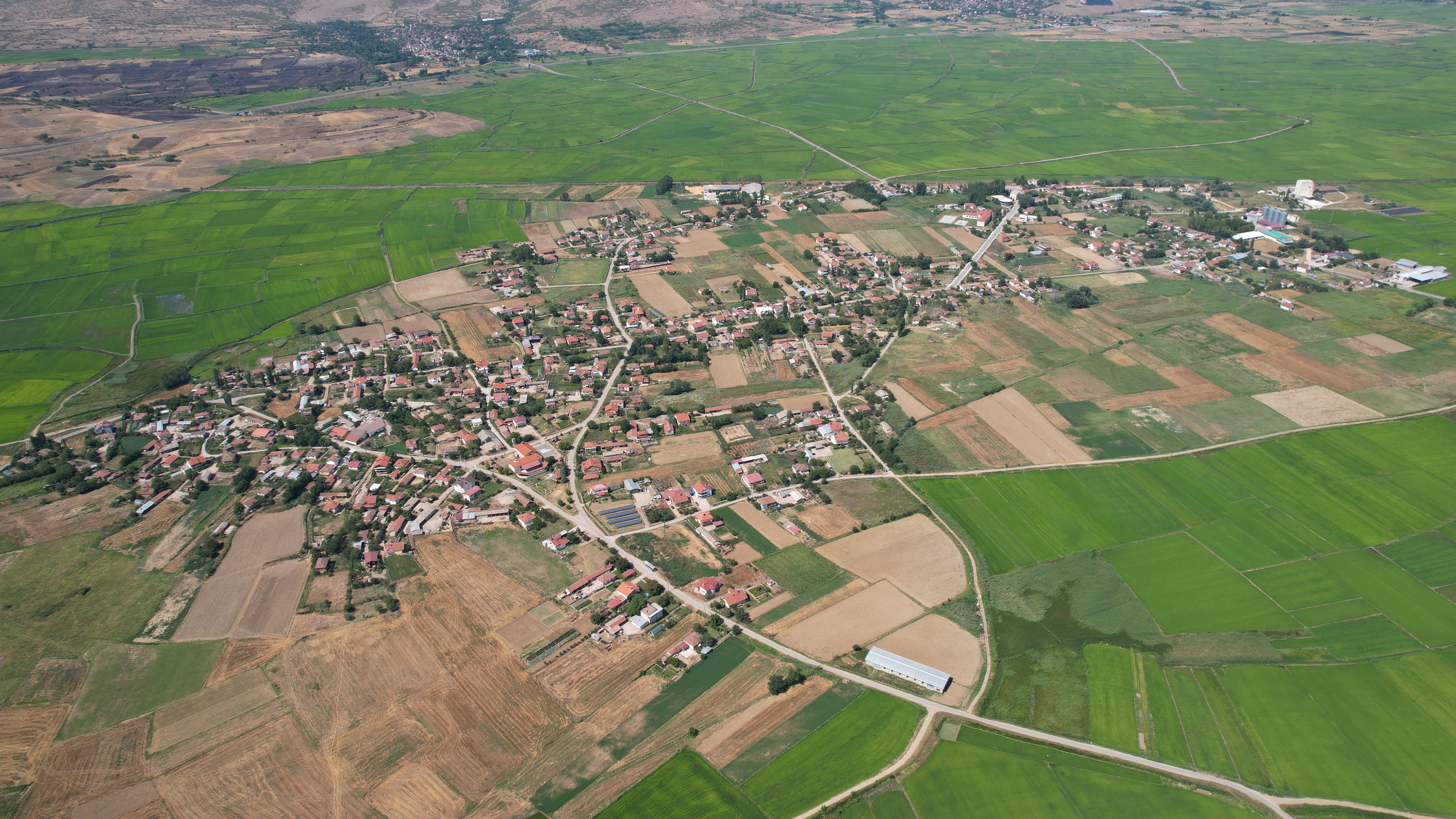
- Air view of the village

- Location within North Macedonia
- Coordinates: 41.871023°N 22.287086°E
- Country: North Macedonia
- Region: Eastern
- Municipality: Češinovo-Obleševo

Population (2002)
  - Total: 998
- Time zone: UTC+1 (CET)
  - Summer (DST): UTC+2 (CEST)
- Website: .

Češinovo (Macedonian: Чешиново) is a village in the municipality of Češinovo-Obleševo, North Macedonia. It used to be a municipality of its own.

== Demographics ==
According to the 2002 census, the village had a total of 998 inhabitants. Ethnic groups in the village include:

- Macedonians 998
