= Vinica Municipality, North Macedonia =

Municipality of North Macedonia

Coordinates: 41.90°N 22.50°E

Vinica Municipality Општина Виница
- Urban municipality
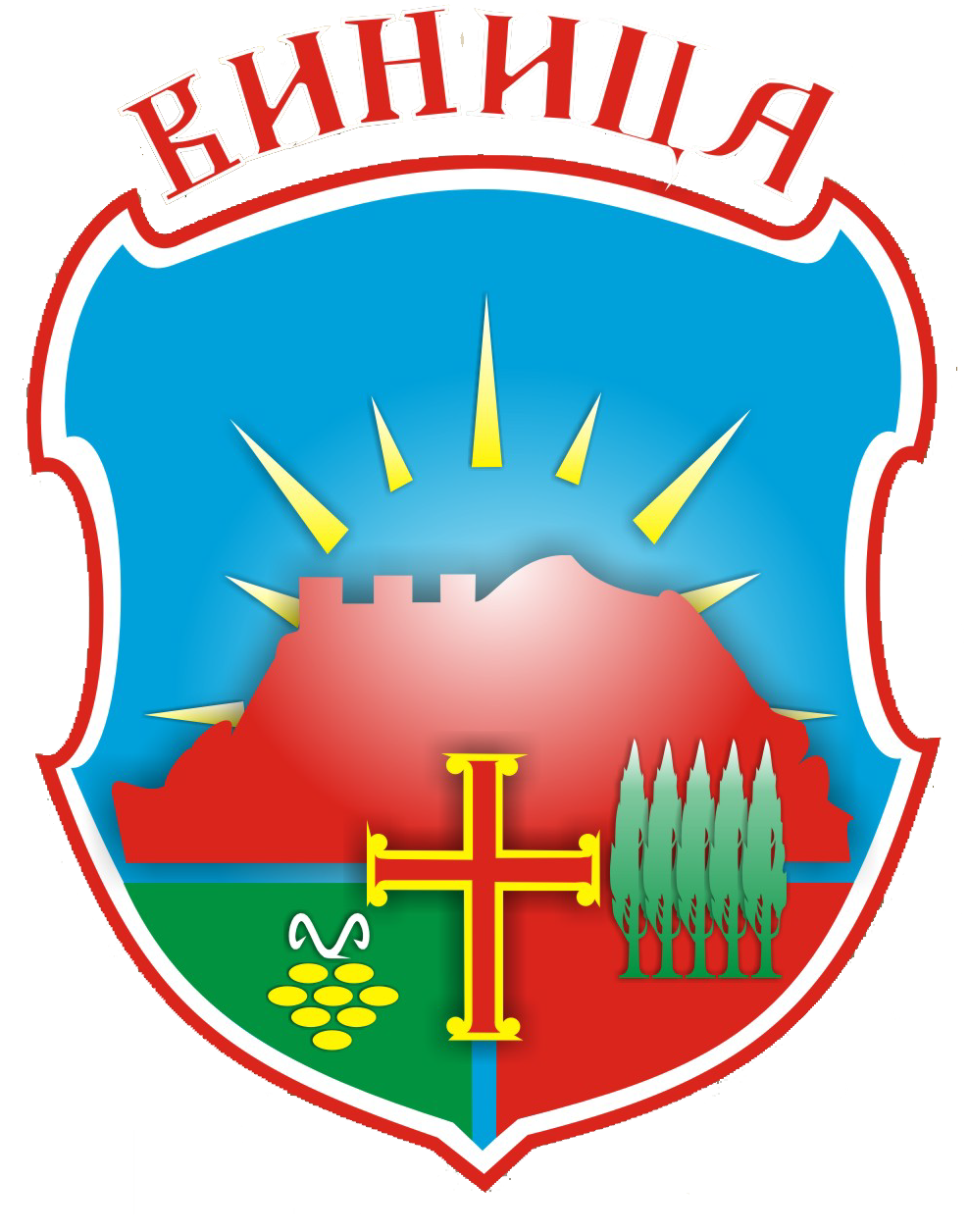
- Flag Coat of arms

- Country: North Macedonia
- Region: Eastern
- Municipal seat: Vinica

Government
  - Mayor: Mile Petkov (VMRO-DPMNE)

Area
  - Total: 432.67 km^{2} (167.05 sq mi)

Population
  - Total: 14,475
  - Density: 33.455/km^{2} (86.648/sq mi)
- Time zone: UTC+1 (CET)
- Postal code: 2310
- Area code: 033
- Vehicle registration: VI
- Website: http://www.vinica.gov.mk

Vinica (Macedonian: Виница [ˈvinitsa]) is a municipality in the eastern part of North Macedonia. Vinica is also the name of the town where the municipal seat is located. The Vinica Municipality is part of the Eastern Statistical Region.

== Geography ==
The municipality borders the Kočani Municipality and Makedonska Kamenica Municipality to the north, Delčevo Municipality to the east, Radoviš Municipality and Berovo Municipality to the south, and Zrnovci Municipality to the west.

== History ==
By the 2003 territorial division of Macedonia, the rural Blatec Municipality was annexed to Vinica Municipality.

== Demographics ==
According to the 2002 Macedonian census, Vinica Municipality has 19,938 residents. According to the 2021 North Macedonia census, this municipality has 14,475 inhabitants. Ethnic groups in the municipality:

	2002		2021	
	Number	%	Number	%
TOTAL	19,938	100	14,475	100
Macedonians	18,261	91.59	11,929	82.41
Roma	1,230	6.17	744	5.14
Turks	272	1.36	173	1.2
Vlachs	121	0.61	89	0.61
Serbs	32	0.16	17	0.12
Albanians			8	0.06
Other / Undeclared / Unknown	22	0.11	78	0.53
Persons for whom data are taken from administrative sources			1,437	9.93

	Demographics of the Vinica municipality
Census year	Population	Territorial Division 2003
1994	17,058
		19,938
2002	17,914
2021	14,475

Demographics of the former Blatec Municipality
Census year	Population
1994	2,005
2002	2,024

== Inhabited places ==
The number of inhabited places in the municipality is 16.
