= Štalkovica =

Štalkovica Шталковица
- Village
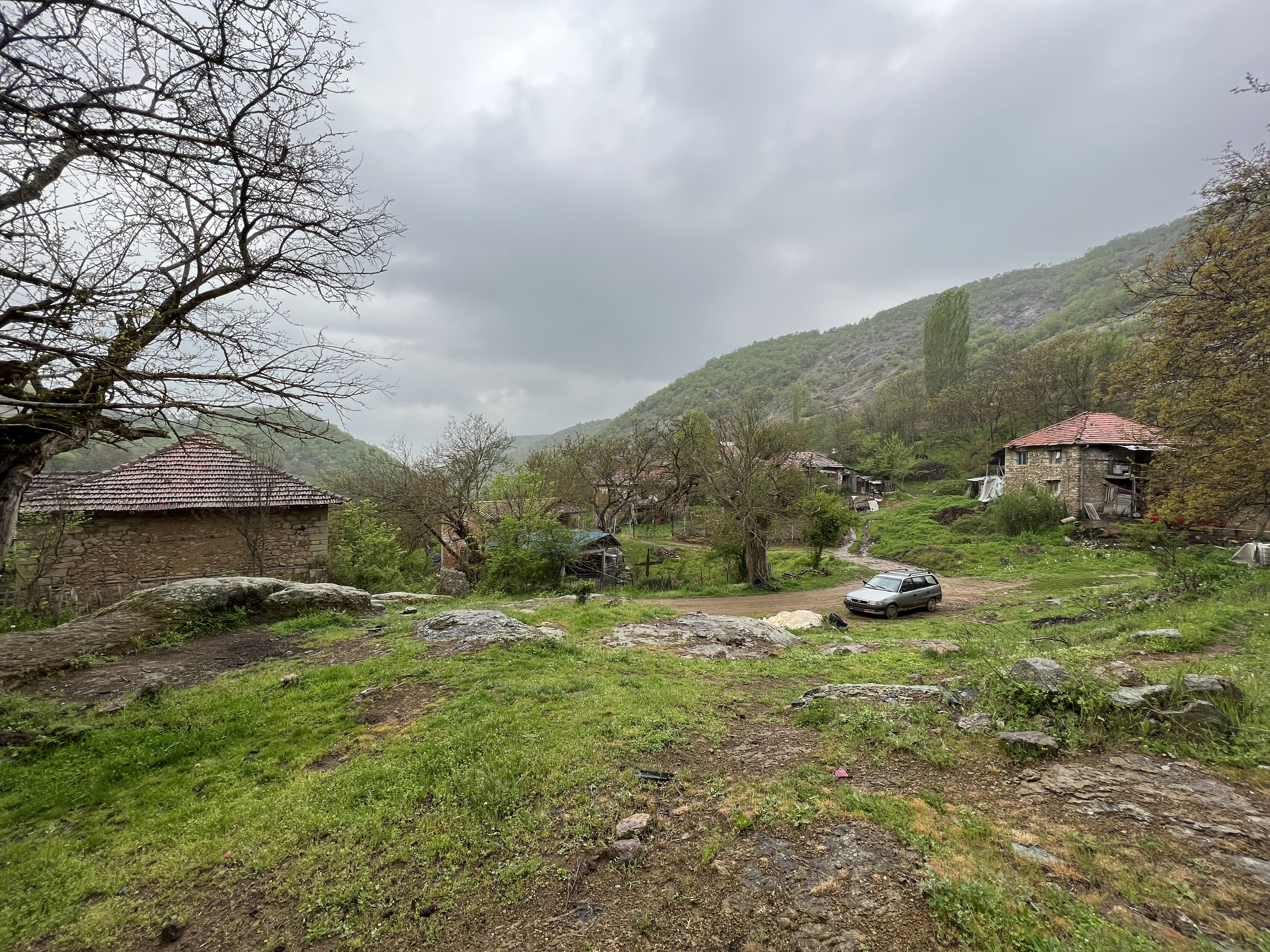
- Houses in the village Štalkovica

- Location within North Macedonia
- Country: North Macedonia
- Region: Eastern
- Municipality: Probištip

Population (2002)
  - Total: 44
- Time zone: UTC+1 (CET)
  - Summer (DST): UTC+2 (CEST)
- Website: .

Štalkovica (Macedonian: Шталковица) is a village in the municipality of Probištip, North Macedonia. It used to be part of the former municipality of Zletovo.

The name of the village is originating from German word "Stahl" and most likely the village was found by Saxons, who settled this region around the town of Kratovo in the 13th century.

== Geography ==
The village of Stalkovica as well as its neighboring villages Ratkovica, Zelengrad, Jamište, Emirica, Kneževo and others are very mountainous villages from the famous historical Zletovska area. Unlike the previously mentioned villages, Stalkovica is at a significantly lower altitude. Because the heights of the mountain Ponikva, west of the also famous Ratkova scale gradually turning into milder heights which after Zletovo and Tursko Rudari start the wavy alluvial plain around Zletovska Reka. The settlement itself is located, except for a few homes, on the right bank of the Štalkovska River. Otherwise, the village has a lot of springs in the higher and lower part, and the climate due to the influence of Bregalnica and Zletovska Reka is moderate continental.

== Demographics ==
According to the statistics of the Bulgarian ethnographer Vasil Kanchov from 1900, there were 260 inhabitants in Stalkovica, all Bulgarians.

According to the Secretary of the Bulgarian Exarchate Dimitar Mišev ("La Macédoine et sa Population Chrétienne"), in 1905 there were 258 inhabitants in Stalkovica, of which 240 were Bulgarians and 18 Vlachs.

According to the 2002 census, the village had a total of 44 inhabitants. Ethnic groups in the village include:

- Macedonians 44
