= Lakavica (disambiguation) =

Lakavica is a river in North Macedonia.

Lakavica may also refer to:

- Lakavica, Gostivar, a village in North Macedonia
- Lakavica, Štip, a village in North Macedonia
