= Lesnovo Volcanic Cone =

Volcanic cone in North Macedonia

Coordinates: 42°0′55″N 22°13′50″E

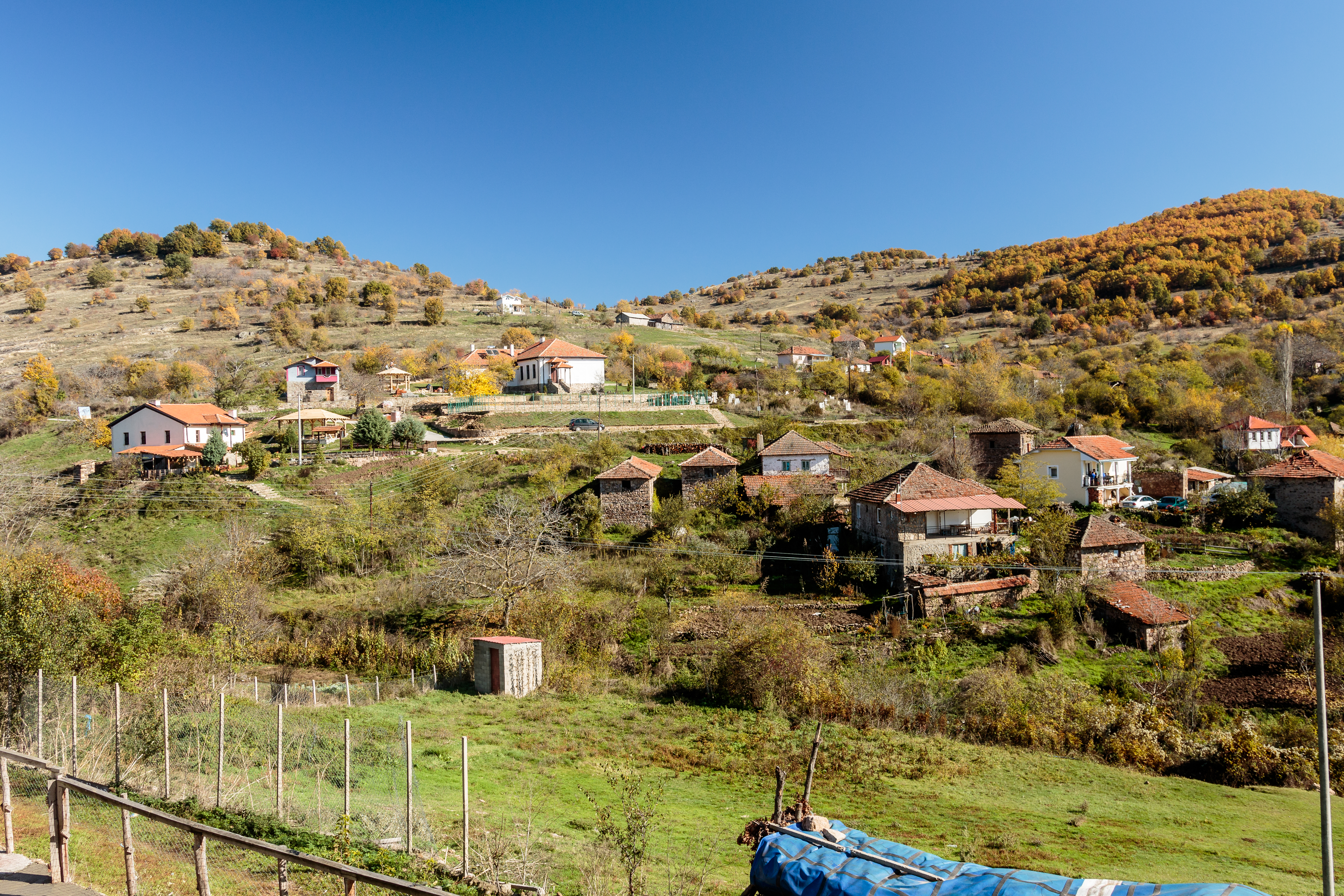
Lesnovo, the village after which the cone got its name, lies in the crater at the head of the cone.

Lesnovo Volcanic Cone (Macedonian: Лесновска купа, Lesnovska kupa) is a volcanic cone in the western part of Osogovo Mountains, between the town of Probištip and the village of Zletovo. It is one of the best preserved volcanic cones in the Kratovo-Zletovo volcanic area as well as in all of North Macedonia. The cone is named after the village of Lesnovo, which is located in the crater of the cone's summit, also known as Lesnovo Crater (Лесновски кратер, Lesnovski Krater). The village is the only settlement in North Macedonia that lies in a clearly preserved fossil volcanic crater. Serbian geographer Jovan Cvijić compared Lesnovo Crater to the crater Valle del Bove located on Mount Etna. Because it is one of the most preserved and most notable craters in North Macedonia, Lesnovo Crater was declared a natural landmark and finds itself on the National Conservation Centre's list of geological rarities.

== Geography ==
The Cone spreads over 12 km^{2} and has a 4 km diameter. It has steep sides and rises 400m above the surrounding terrain. Morphologically, the Cone's south and southeastern side is particularly noticeable. It is intersected by the valley of the Zletovska Reka on the east, and the valley of Dobrevska Reka on the west. The Cone's head is a well-preserved caldera (eroded crater) with a 1,5 km diamеter, and the depth of its middle reaches 150–200 m. Annularly, there are 7-8 cone-like hills, or volcanic peaks, around the caldera. They are: Smorinec, Egumenički Vrv, Varadinova (Dzaneva) Čuka, Nuševa Čuka, Sveta Troica, Kolarsko, Sveti Atanas, Štrbi Kamen, Mali Vrv and Ilinski Vrv, as well as the hills Volujak and Drač on the south. The most notable of them is a northern peak called Ilin Krst, which was very likely a main volcanic center and where the largest amount of lava and volcanicastics erupted from. On the southern and eastern side of the cone there are three more distinct peaks: Gumički Rid (1.048 m), Nuševa Čuka or Gorno Brdo (1.025 m) and Sveta Troica (1.012 m). The small river Lesnovska Reka flows through the middle of the crater in a northeast–southwest direction, intersecting the crater's western frame.At the point of intersection, the river's valley is steep and has numerous caves on the sides. The majority of recesses and holes in the rocks are not natural, but most likely a result of extracting solid volcanic rock for manufacturing millstones.

== Geomorphology ==
Lesnovska Kupa is a remainder of Oligocene volcanic activity in this part of the Kratovo-Zletovo volcanic area. During its active period, around 25-30 million years ago, the cone was much higher, and the crater looked different. The volcano in this area was characterized by strong, explosive eruptions followed by the discharge of large amounts of ash, gas, and thick, dough-like lava. That is why considerable amounts of tuff layers, traces of lava flow, can be seen in the area, as well as occurrences of volcanic bombs. Prolonged erosion after the end of the active volcanic period caused the lowering, cutting and deposition of this phenomenon, which, despite the passing of millions of years, is relatively well preserved. The volcanic rocks in this area, dacitic ignimbrite are exposed to erosive processes, whereupon numerous small denuded shapes (ossicles, cups, footprints, etc.) are created in the relief.
