= Dreveno =

Dreveno Древено
- Village
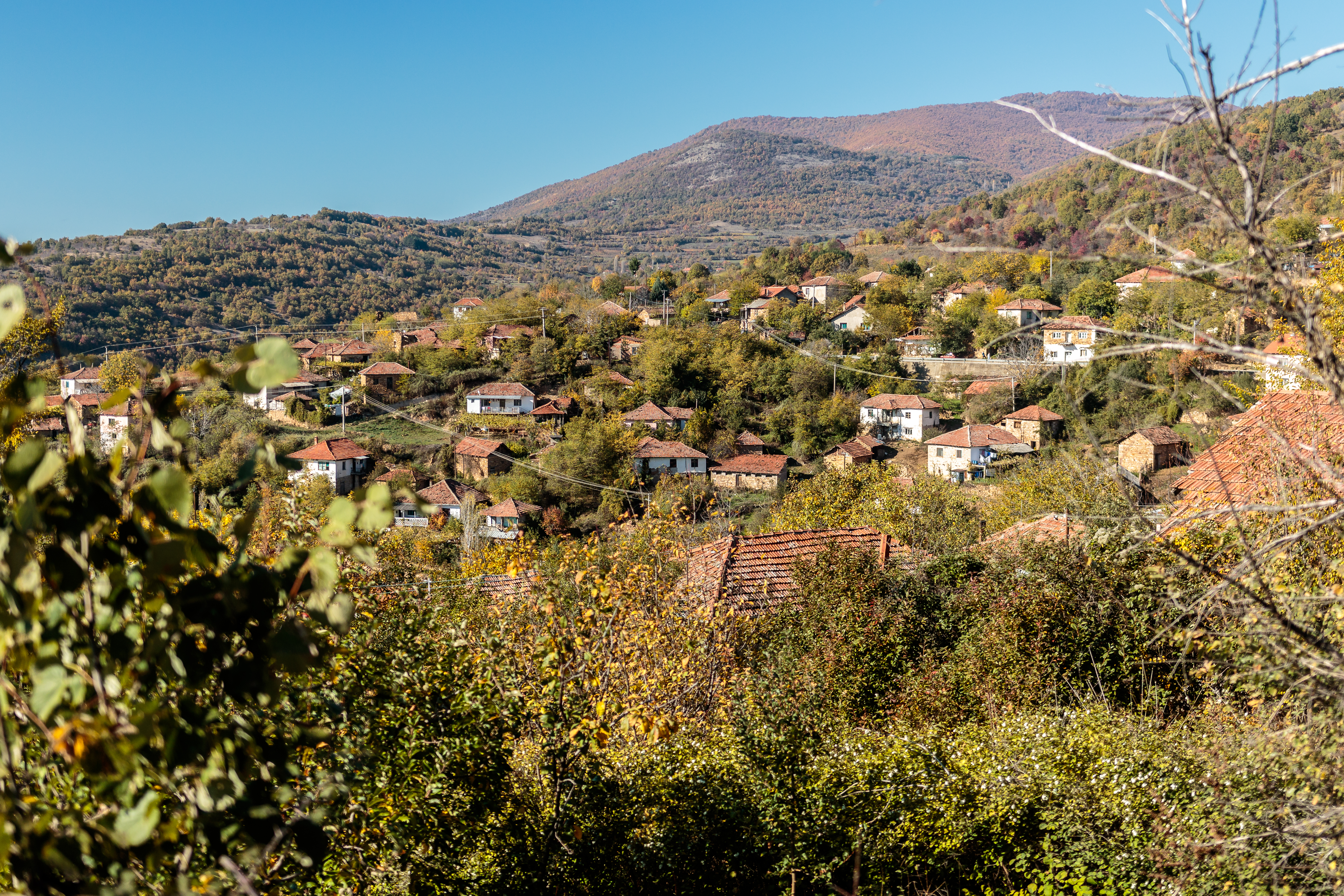
- Panoramic view of the village Dreveno

- Location within North Macedonia
- Coordinates: 42.007786°N 22.211406°E
- Country: North Macedonia
- Region: Eastern
- Municipality: Probištip

Population (2002)
  - Total: 213
- Time zone: UTC+1 (CET)
  - Summer (DST): UTC+2 (CEST)
- Website: .

Dreveno (Macedonian: Древено) is a village in the municipality of Probištip, North Macedonia. It used to be part of the former municipality of Zletovo.

== Demographics ==
According to the 2002 census, the village had a total of 213 inhabitants. Ethnic groups in the village include:

- Macedonians 212
- Other 1
