= Ratavica =

Ratavica Ратавица
- Village
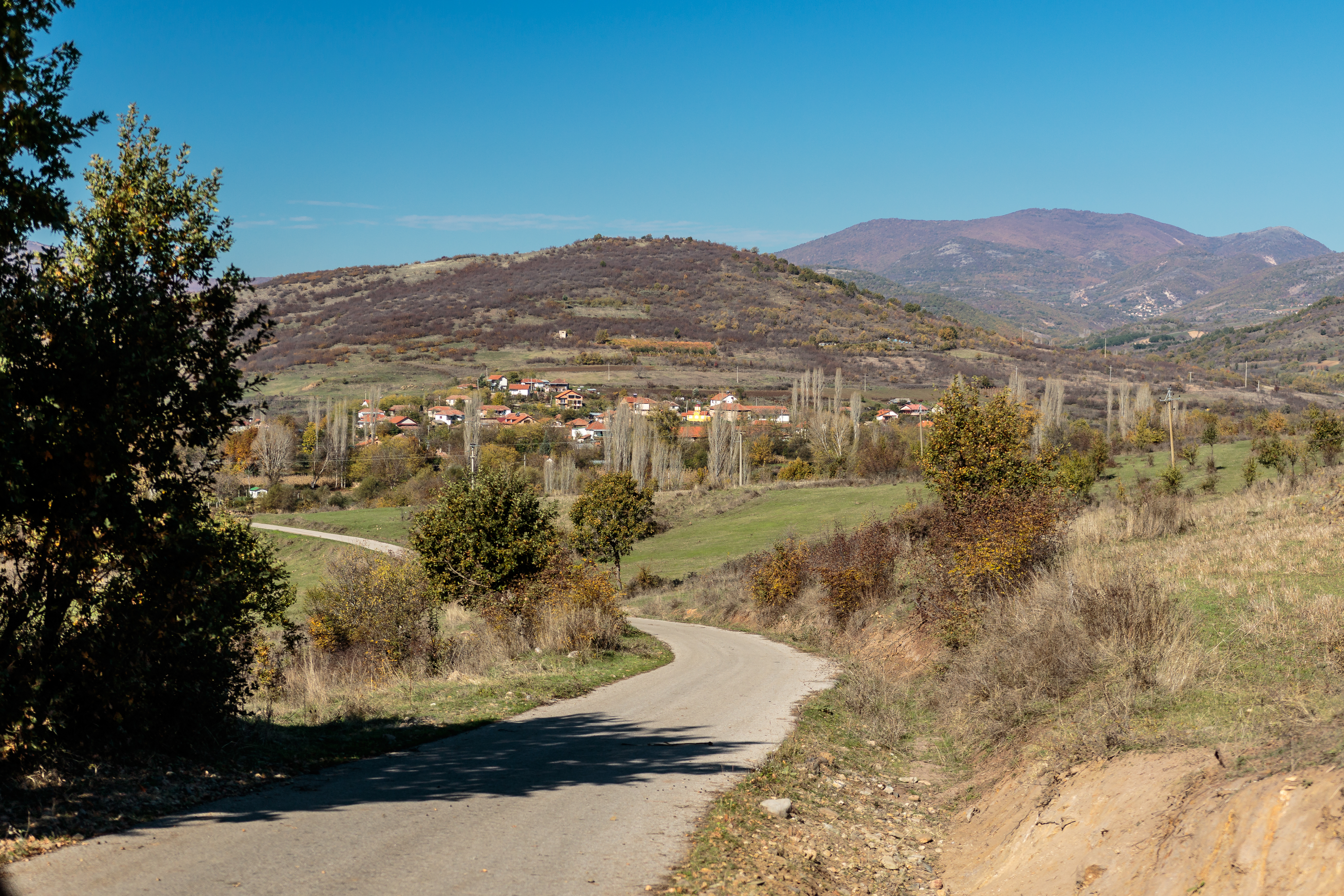
- Panoramic view of the village

- Location within North Macedonia
- Coordinates: 41.967187°N 22.217638°E
- Country: North Macedonia
- Region: Eastern
- Municipality: Probištip

Population (2002)
  - Total: 277
- Time zone: UTC+1 (CET)
  - Summer (DST): UTC+2 (CEST)
- Website: .

Ratavica (Macedonian: Ратавица) is a village in the municipality of Probištip, North Macedonia. It used to be part of the former municipality of Zletovo.

== Demographics ==
According to the 2002 census, the village had a total of 277 inhabitants. The ethnic groups of the village include:

- Macedonians 267
- Serbs 1
- Aromanians 9
