= Tripatanci =

Tripatanci Трипатанци
- Village
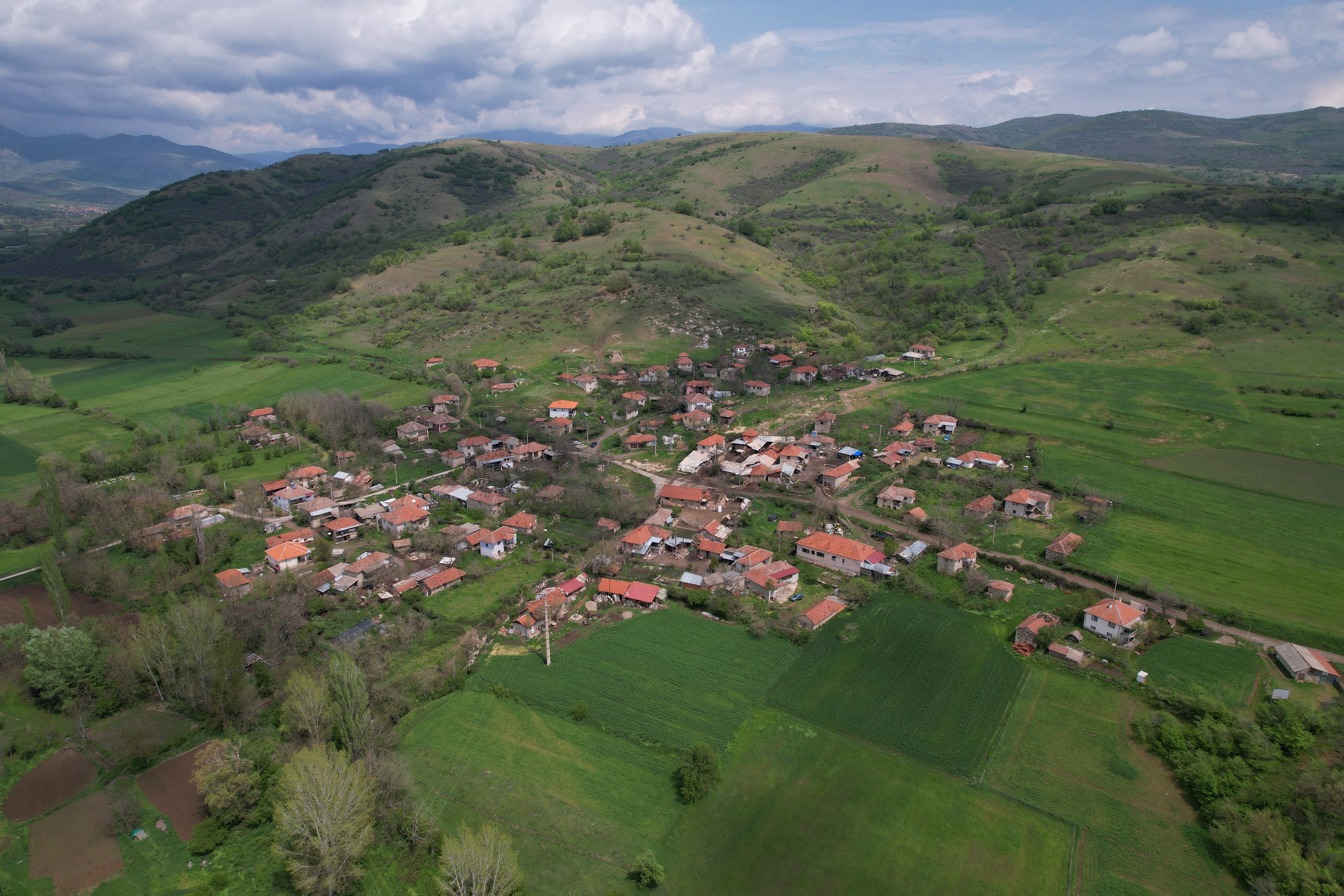
- View of the village

- Location within North Macedonia
- Coordinates: 41.932188°N 22.206891°E
- Country: North Macedonia
- Region: Eastern
- Municipality: Probištip

Population (2002)
  - Total: 126
- Time zone: UTC+1 (CET)
  - Summer (DST): UTC+2 (CEST)
- Website: .

Tripatanci (Macedonian: Трипатанци) is a village in the municipality of Probištip, North Macedonia. It used to be part of the former municipality of Zletovo.

== Demographics ==
According to the 2002 census, the village had a total of 126 inhabitants. Ethnic groups in the village include:

- Macedonians 125
- Serbs 1
