= Kalnište, North Macedonia =

Kalnište
- Village
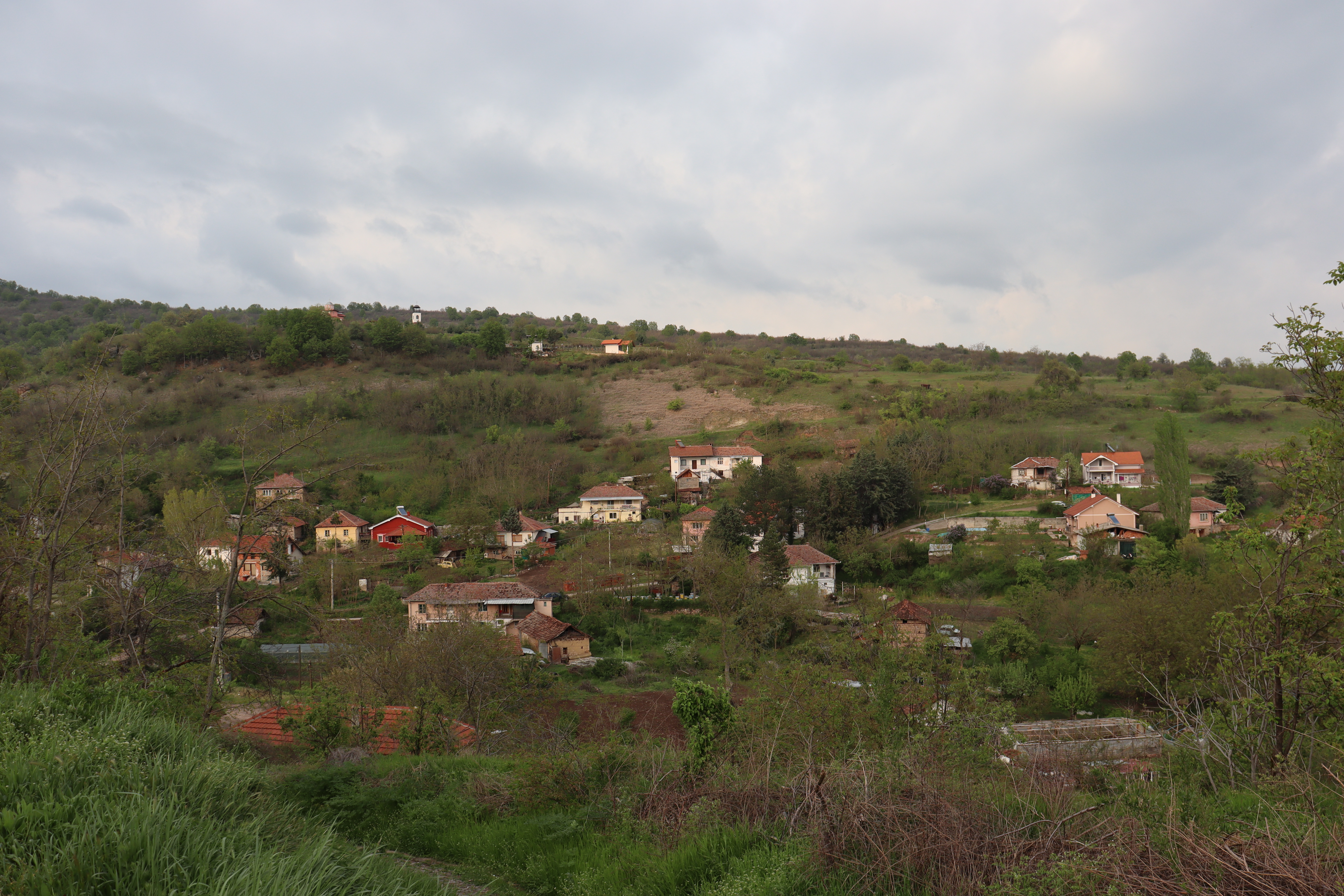
- View of the village

- Location within North Macedonia
- Coordinates: 41.994677°N 22.187697°E
- Country: North Macedonia
- Region: Eastern
- Municipality: Probištip

Population (2002)
  - Total: 2,102
- Time zone: UTC+1 (CET)
  - Summer (DST): UTC+2 (CEST)
- Website: .

Kalnište (Macedonian: Калниште) is a neighborhood of Probištip town in the municipality of Probištip, North Macedonia.

== Demographics ==
According census in 1900 the whole village is inhabited only by Bulgarians.

According to the 2002 census, the neighborhood had a total of 2,102 inhabitants. Ethnic groups in the village include:

- Macedonians 2,079
- Yugoslavs 20
- Romani 1
- Other 2
