= Probištip Municipality =

Municipality of North Macedonia

Coordinates: 42.01°N 22.15°E

Probištip Municipality Општина Пробиштип
- Urban municipality
- Coat of arms

- Country: North Macedonia
- Region: Eastern
- Municipal seat: Probištip

Government
  - Mayor: Tony Tonchevski (VMRO-DPMNE)

Area
  - Total: 325.57 km^{2} (125.70 sq mi)

Population
  - Total: 13,417
  - Density: 41.211/km^{2} (106.74/sq mi)
- Time zone: UTC+1 (CET)
- Postal code: 2210
- Area code: 032
- Vehicle registration: PS
- Website: http://www.probistip.gov.mk

Probištip Municipality (Macedonian: Општина Пробиштип [ˈprɔbiʃtip]) is an urban municipality in eastern North Macedonia. Probištip is also the name of the city where the municipal seat is located. This municipality is part of the Eastern Statistical Region.

== Geography ==
The municipality borders Kratovo Municipality to the north, Kočani and Češinovo-Obleševo municipalities to the east, Sveti Nikole Municipality to the west and Štip and Karbinci municipalities to the south.

The municipality spreads over the middle and lower part of the course of the Zletovska River.

== Demographics ==
Following the 2003 territorial division of North Macedonia, the rural Zletovo Municipality was annexed to the Probištip Municipality. The former had 3,428 residents, while the latter had 12,963 inhabitants. The combined municipality, thus, had 16,193 inhabitants. According to the 2021 North Macedonis census, this municipality has 13,417 inhabitants. Ethnic groups in the municipality include the following:

	2002		2021	
	Number	%	Number	%
TOTAL	16,193	100	13,417	100
Macedonians	15,977	98.67	12,617	94.04
Roma	37	0.22	104	0.76
Serbs	89	0.55	56	0.42
Vlachs	37	0.22	21	0.16
Albanians			8	0.06
Turks	6	0.06	2	0.02
Bosniaks	1	0.01	1	0.01
Other / Undeclared / Unknown	46	0.27	65	0.48
Persons for whom data are taken from administrative sources			543	4.05

== Inhabited places ==
Inhabited places in the Probištip Municipality
villages: Buneš | Bučište | Gajranci | Gorni Stubol | Gorno Barbarevo | Grizilevci | Gujnovci | Dobrevo | Dolni Stubol | Dolno Barbarevo | Dreveno | Drenok | Zarepinci | Zelengrad | Zletovo | Jamište | Kalnište | Kukovo | Kundino | Lezovo | Lesnovo | Marčino | Neokazi | Pestršino | Petrišino | Pišica | Plešanci | Puzdreci | Ratavica | Strisovci | Tursko Rudari | Strmoš | Tripatanci | Troolo | Štalkovica | Cities: Probištip

== Economy ==
=== Mining ===
The main economic contributor in the municipality is the lead and zinc mines of "Zletovo", now called "Indo Minerals and Metals", which have been in continuous exploitation since 1970. They have been bought by "Bulmak", a large Bulgarian mining company that has modernized the mines, which have been operating at full capacity.
