= Tursko Rudari =

Tursko Rudari Турско Рудари
- Village
- Location within North Macedonia
- Coordinates: 41.980809°N 22.255453°E
- Country: North Macedonia
- Region: Eastern
- Municipality: Probištip

Area
  - Total: 10.45 km^{2} (4.03 sq mi)
- Elevation: 540 m (1,770 ft)

Population (2021)
  - Total: 153
  - Density: 14.64/km^{2} (37.9/sq mi)
- Time zone: UTC+1 (CET)
  - Summer (DST): UTC+2 (CEST)
- Postal code: 2212
- Area code: 032
- Website: .

Tursko Rudari (Macedonian: Турско Рудари) is a village in the municipality of Probištip, North Macedonia. It used to be part of the former municipality of Zletovo.

== Demographics ==
According to the 2002 census, the village had a total of 185 inhabitants. Ethnic groups in the village include:. As the name suggests, this is a village of Turkish Rudari. They originally came from the flooded island of Ada Kaleh.

History: Around 1833-1838, a family of Rudari from Băbeni, a small town in Vâlcea County in the historical region of Wallachia, Romania, came to the Turkish island of Ada Kaleh. There they embraced Islam and became known as Turkish Rudari.

When the Turkish population of Ada Kaleh migrated to Turkey and other parts of Romania in 1967, a group of these Turkifid Rudari migrated to North Macedonia.

- Rudari 185
