= Leskovica, Štip =

Leskovica Лесковица
- Village
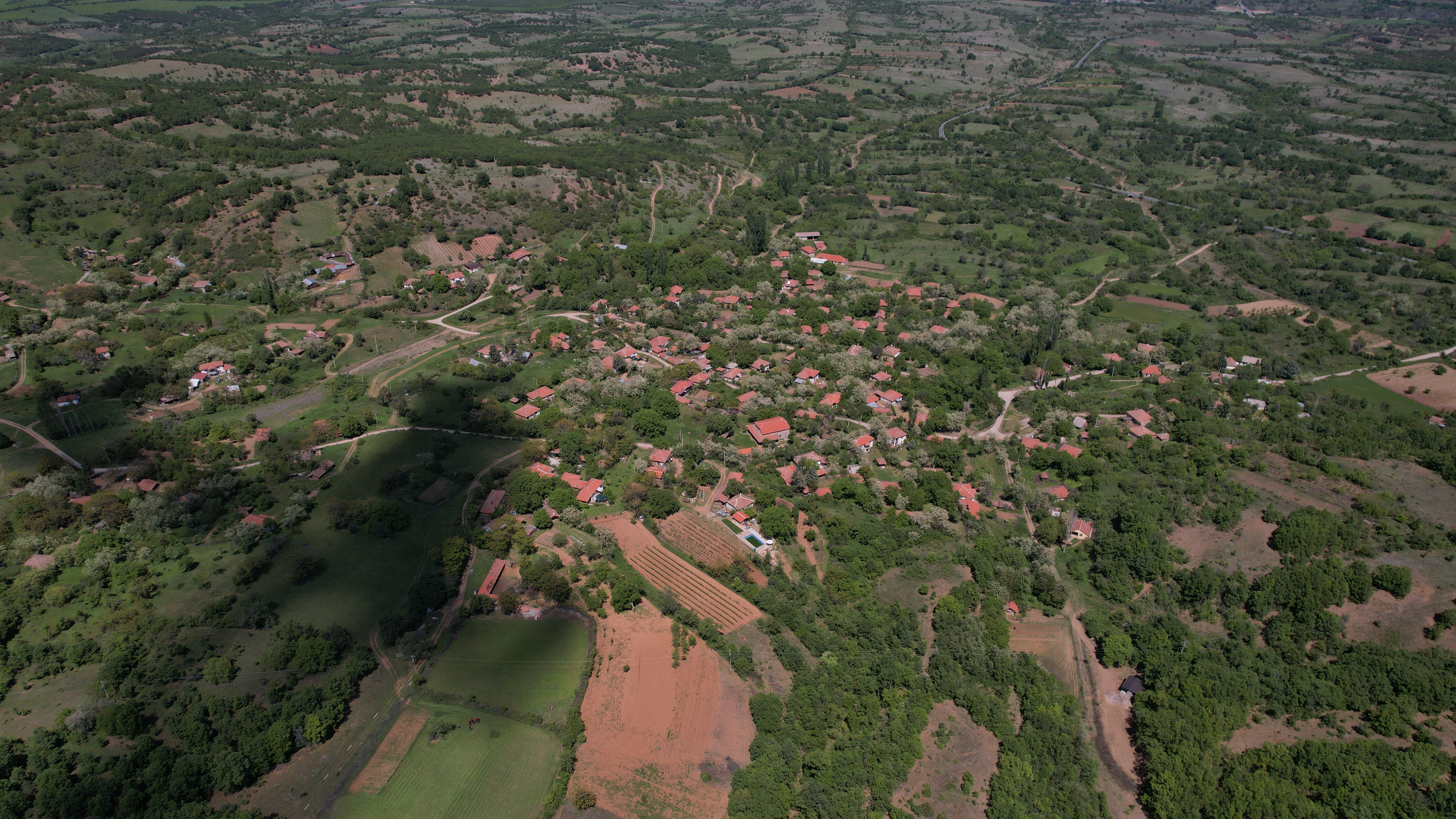
- Air view of the village

- Location within North Macedonia
- Coordinates: 41.594592°N 22.245553°E
- Country: North Macedonia
- Region: Eastern
- Municipality: Štip

Population (2002)
  - Total: 113
- Time zone: UTC+1 (CET)
  - Summer (DST): UTC+2 (CEST)
- Website: .

Leskovica (Macedonian: Лесковица) is a village in the municipality of Štip, North Macedonia.

== Demographics ==
According to the 2002 census, the village had a total of 113 inhabitants. Ethnic groups in the village include:

- Macedonians 111
- Serbs 2

As of 2021, the village of Leskovica has 45 inhabitants and the ethnic composition was the following:

- Macedonians – 37
- Serbs – 1
- Person without Data - 7
