= Tri Češmi =

Tri Češmi Три Чешми
- Village
- Location within North Macedonia
- Coordinates: 41.773657°N 22.134793°E
- Country: North Macedonia
- Region: Eastern
- Municipality: Štip

Population (2002)
  - Total: 1,065
- Time zone: UTC+1 (CET)
  - Summer (DST): UTC+2 (CEST)
- Website: .

Tri Češmi (Macedonian: Три Чешми) is a village in the municipality of Štip, North Macedonia.

== Demographics ==
According to the 2002 census, the village had a total of 1,065 inhabitants. Ethnic groups in the village include:

- Macedonians 933
- Serbs 5
- Aromanians 126
- Other 1

As of 2021, the village of Tri Cheshmi has 947 inhabitants and the ethnic composition was the following:

- Macedonians – 808
- Aromanians – 88
- Serbs – 3
- others – 2
- Person without Data - 46
