= Počivalo =

Počivalo Почивало
- Village
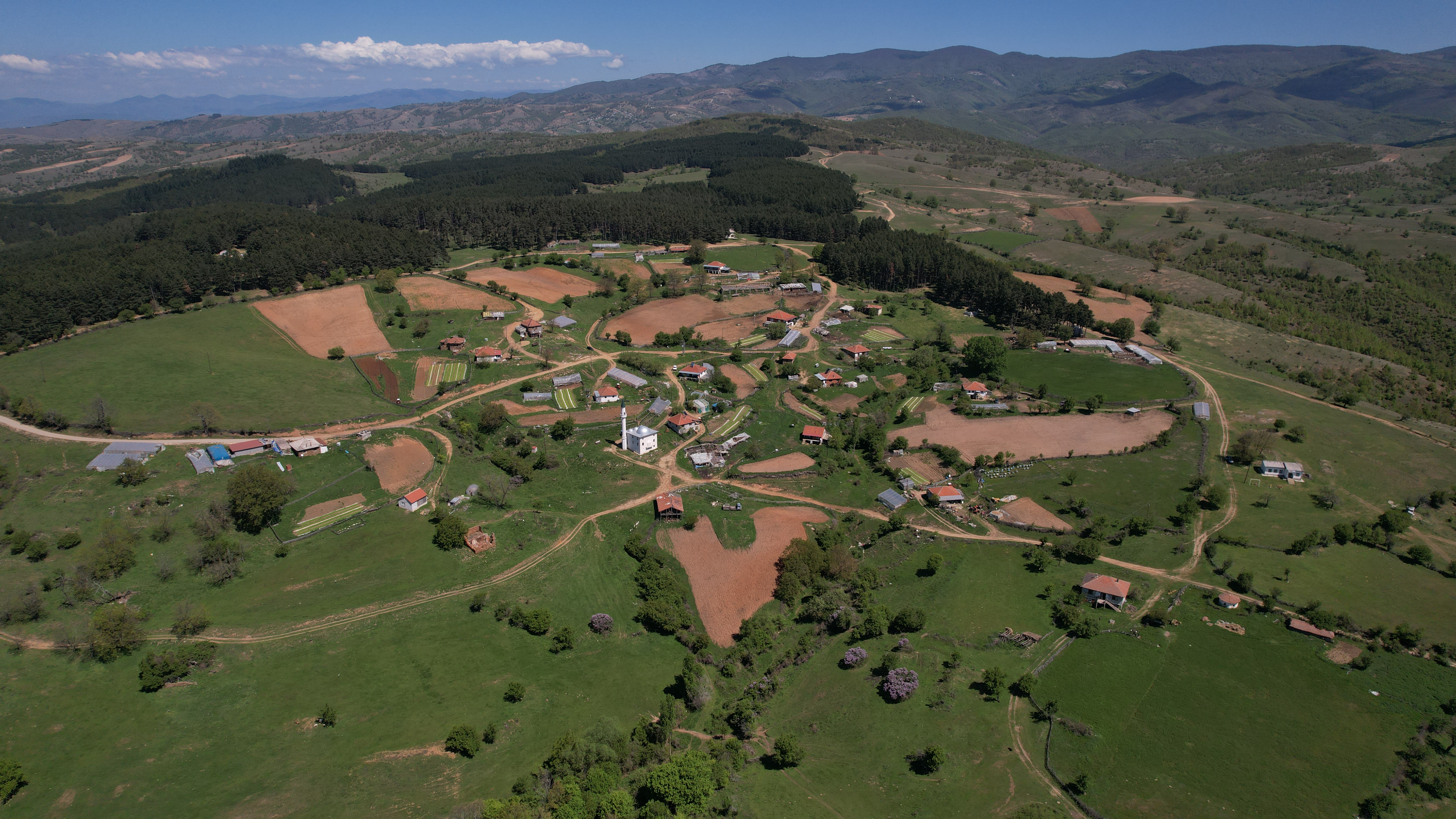
- Air view of the village

- Location within North Macedonia
- Coordinates: 41.7047658°N 22.3839896°E
- Country: North Macedonia
- Region: Eastern
- Municipality: Štip

Population (2021)
  - Total: 63
- Time zone: UTC+1 (CET)
  - Summer (DST): UTC+2 (CEST)
- Website: .

Počivalo (Macedonian: Почивало) is a village in the municipality of Štip, North Macedonia.

== Demographics ==
As of the 2021 census, Počivalo had 63 residents with the following ethnic composition:

- Turks 60
- Persons for whom data are taken from administrative sources 3

According to the 2002 census, the village had a total of 79 inhabitants. Ethnic groups in the village include:

- Turks 75
- Other 1
