= Star Karaorman =

Star Karaorman Стар Караорман
- Village
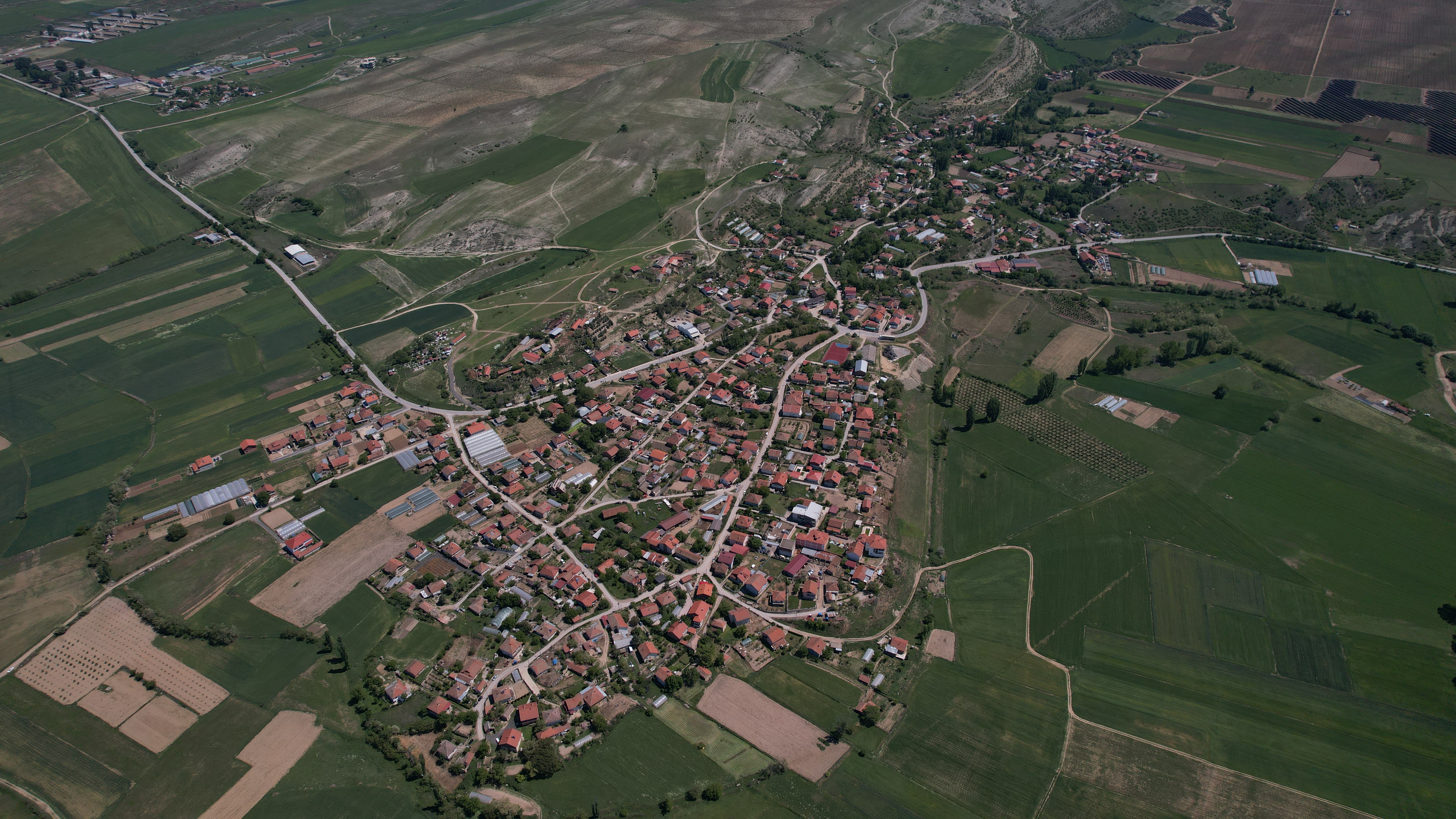
- Air view of the village

- Location within North Macedonia
- Coordinates: 41.781569°N 22.203447°E
- Country: North Macedonia
- Region: Eastern
- Municipality: Štip

Population (2021)
  - Total: 924
- Time zone: UTC+1 (CET)
  - Summer (DST): UTC+2 (CEST)
- Website: .

Star Karaorman (Macedonian: Стар Караорман) is a village in the municipality of Štip, North Macedonia.

== Demographics ==
As of the 2021 census, Star Karaorman had 924 residents with the following ethnic composition:

- Macedonians 791
- Persons for whom data are taken from administrative sources 82
- Aromanians 49
- Serbs 2

According to the 2002 census, the village had a total of 911 inhabitants. Ethnic groups in the village include:

- Macedonians 840
- Serbs 3
- Aromanians 67
- Other 1
