= Creška =

Creška Црешка Creshkë
- Village
- Location within North Macedonia
- Coordinates: 41.7047°N 21.9811°E
- Country: North Macedonia
- Region: Eastern
- Municipality: Štip

Population (2002)
  - Total: 0
- Time zone: UTC+1 (CET)
  - Summer (DST): UTC+2 (CEST)
- Website: .

Creška (Macedonian: Црешка, Albanian: Creshkë) is an abandoned village in the municipality of Štip, North Macedonia.

== Demographics ==
The settlement last had inhabitants in the 1961 census, where it was recorded as being populated by 38 Albanians and 9 Turks.

According to the 2002 census, the village had 0 inhabitants. Ethnic groups in the village include:
