= Plešanci =

Plešanci Плешанци
- Village
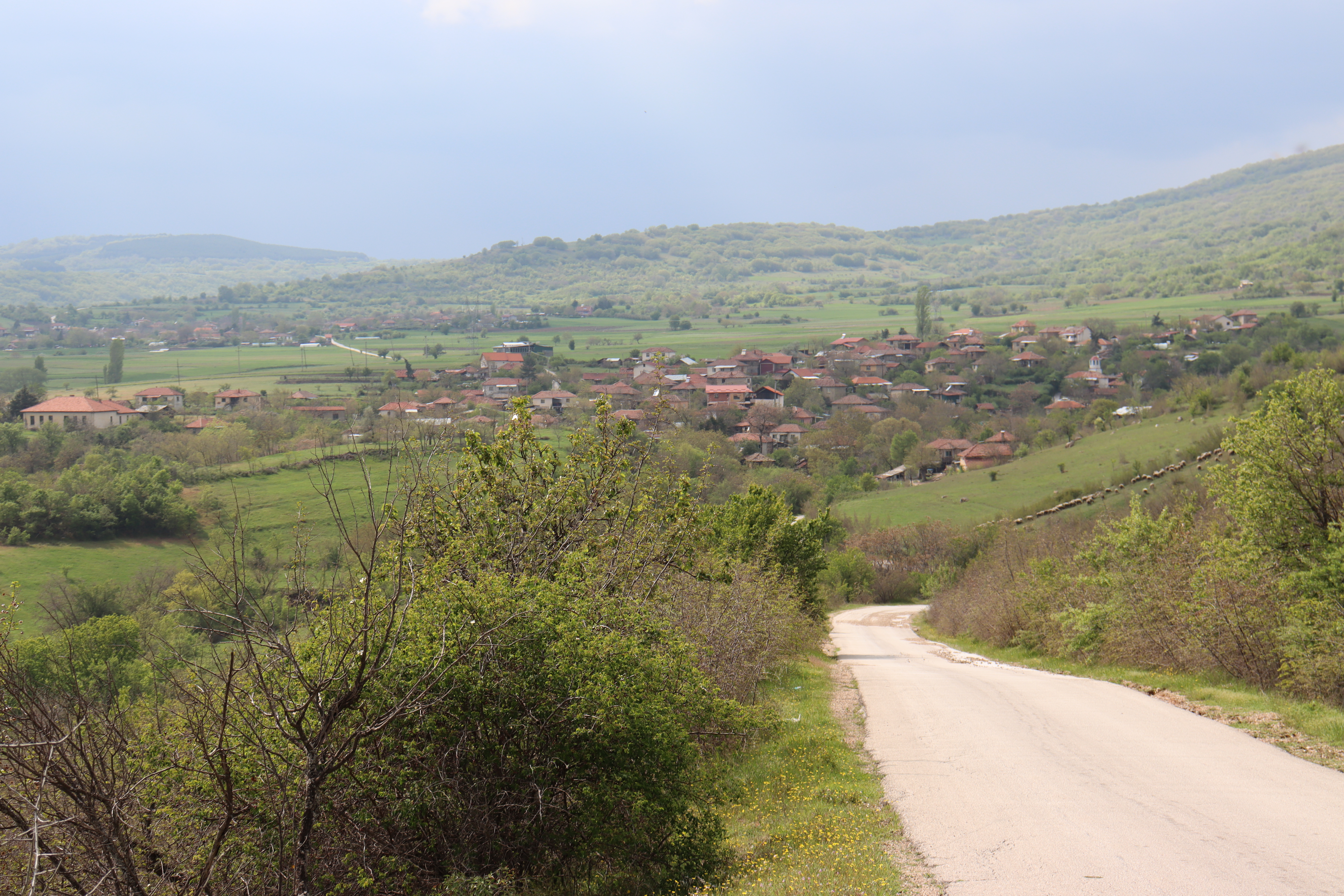
- View of the village

- Location within North Macedonia
- Coordinates: 41.998756°N 22.133700°E
- Country: North Macedonia
- Region: Eastern
- Municipality: Probištip

Population (2002)
  - Total: 168
- Time zone: UTC+1 (CET)
  - Summer (DST): UTC+2 (CEST)
- Website: .

Plešanci (Macedonian: Плешанци) is a village in the municipality of Probištip, North Macedonia.

== Demographics ==
According to the 2002 census, the village had a total of 168 inhabitants. Ethnic groups in the village include:

- Macedonians 168
