= Sarčievo =

Sarčievo Сарчиево
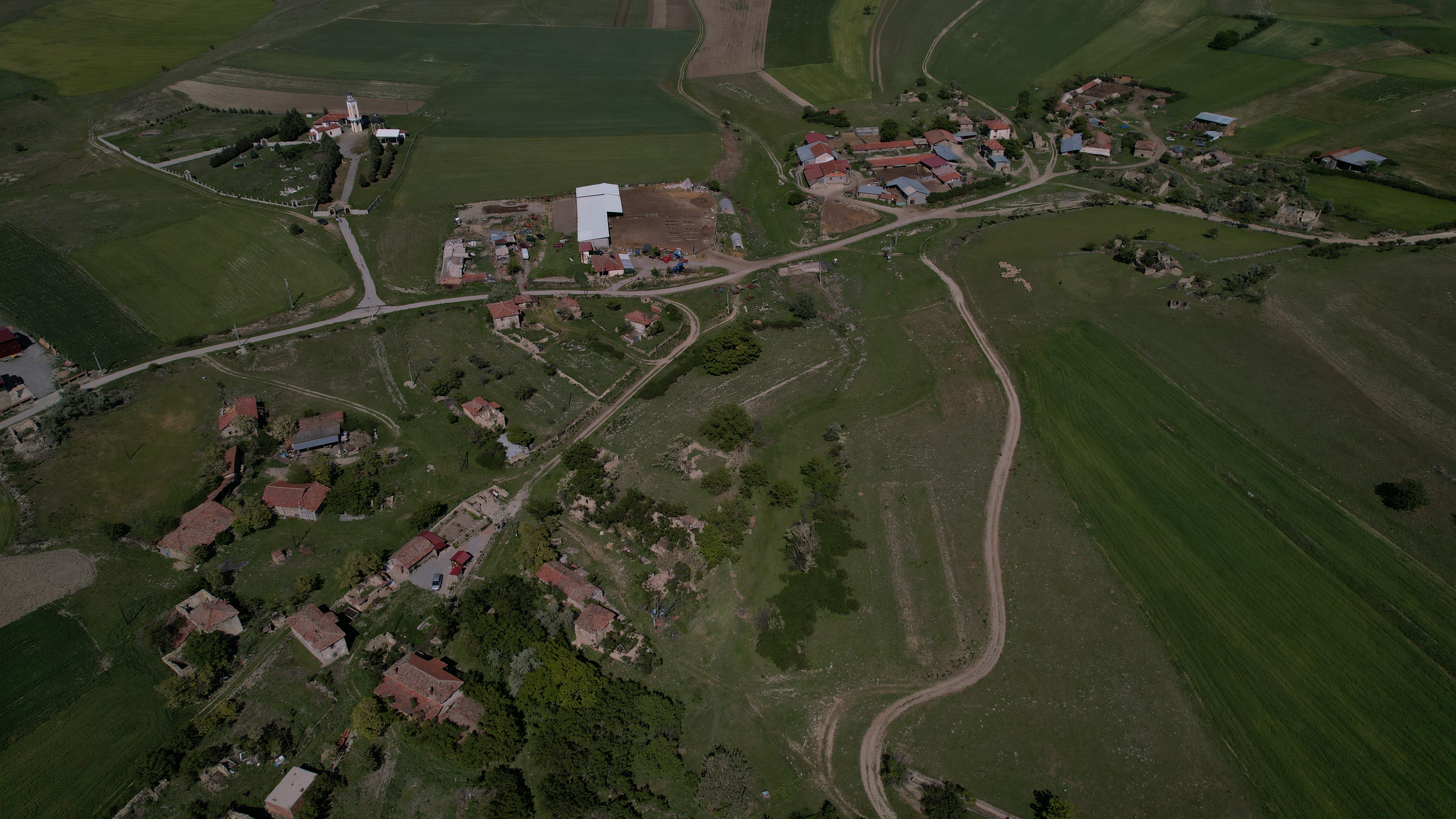
- Air view of the village

- Location within North Macedonia
- Coordinates: 41°48′37″N 22°8′1″E
- Country: North Macedonia
- Region: Eastern
- Municipality: Štip

Population (2002)
  - Total: 21
- Time zone: UTC+1 (CET)

Sarčievo (Macedonian: Сарчиево) is a village in Štip Municipality in North Macedonia.

In August 2010, the village entered the Guinness Book of World Records for cooking the biggest pot of beans in recorded history. Over 3,100 litres of beans were cooked in a four-tonne pot.

== Demographics ==
According to the 2002 census, the village had a total of 21 inhabitants. Ethnic groups in the village include:

- Macedonians 21

As of 2021, the village of Sarchievo has 5 inhabitants and the ethnic composition was the following:

- Macedonians – 5
