= Skandalci =

Skandalci Скандалци Skandallca
- Village
- Location within North Macedonia
- Coordinates: 41.7283°N 22.0674°E
- Country: North Macedonia
- Region: Eastern
- Municipality: Štip

Population (2002)
  - Total: 0
- Time zone: UTC+1 (CET)
  - Summer (DST): UTC+2 (CEST)
- Website: .

Skandalci (Macedonian: Скандалци, Albanian: Skandallca) is an abandoned village in the municipality of Štip, North Macedonia.

== Demographics ==
The settlement last had inhabitants in the 1961 census, where it was recorded as being populated by 31 Albanians.

According to the 2002 census, the village had 0 inhabitants.
