= Šašavarlija =

Šašavarlija Шашаварлија
- Village
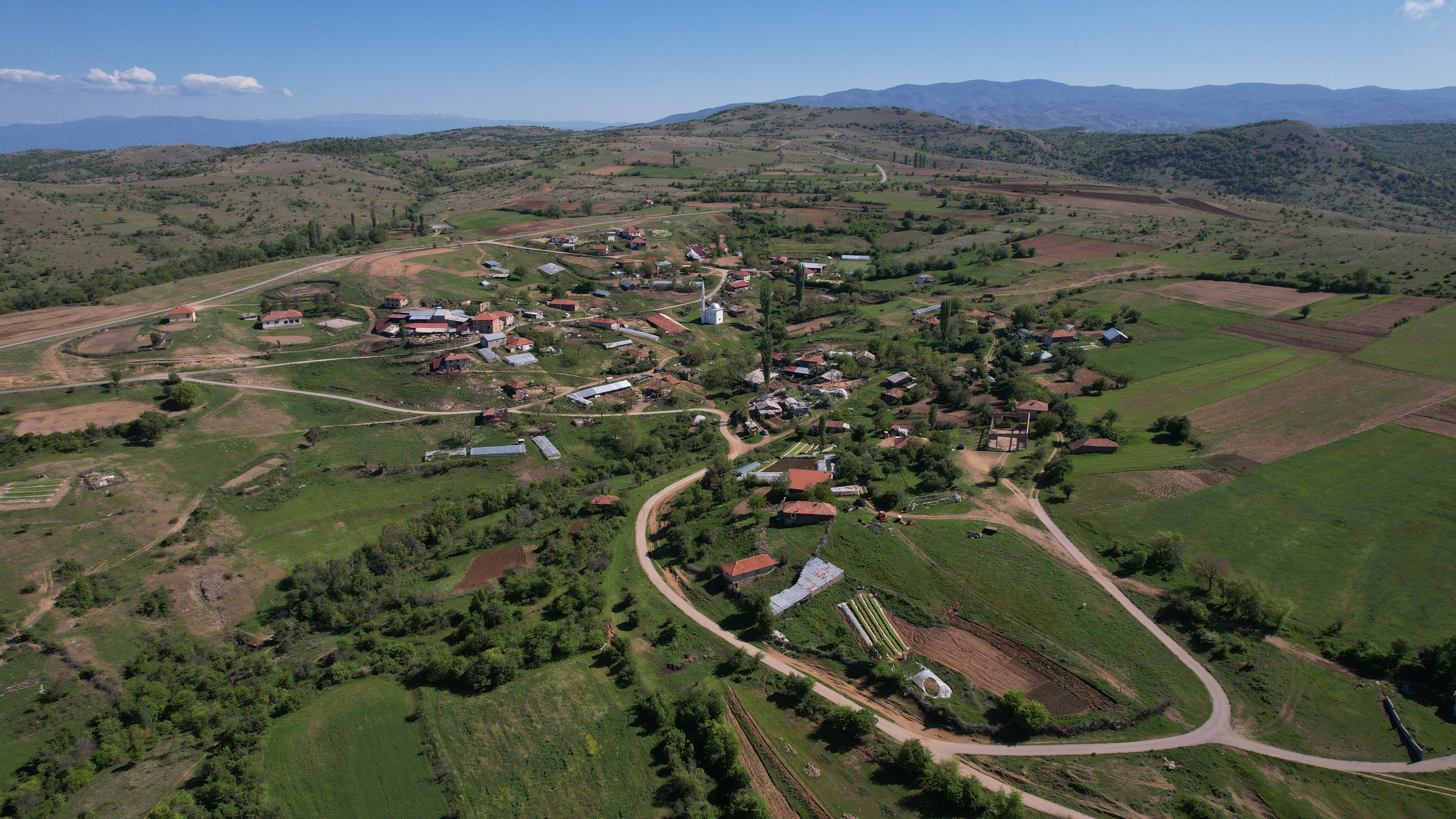
- Air view of the village

- Location within North Macedonia
- Coordinates: 41.716946°N 22.287116°E
- Country: North Macedonia
- Region: Eastern
- Municipality: Štip

Population (2002)
  - Total: 108
- Time zone: UTC+1 (CET)
  - Summer (DST): UTC+2 (CEST)
- Website: .

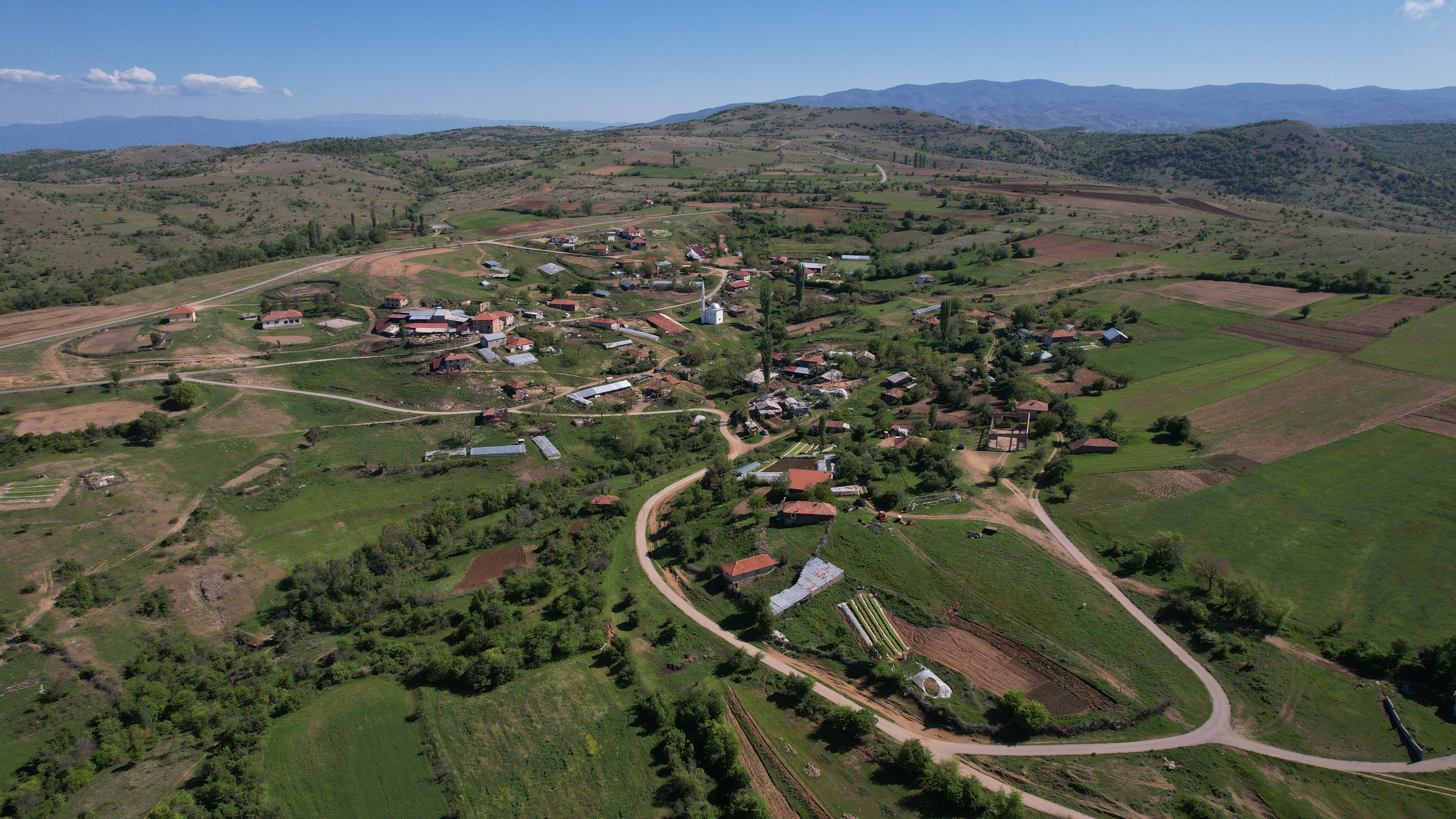
Поглед на Шашаварлија

Šašavarlija (Macedonian: Шашаварлија, Turkish: Şaşavarlı) is a village in the municipality of Štip, North Macedonia.

== History ==
According to the Bulgarian ethnographer Vasil Kanchov it was a pure Turkish Muslim village at the beginning of the 20th century. The famous Turkish retail company Pehlivanoğlu surname hails from this village, and in an interview in 2009 they were fluent in Macedonian Turkish Government opened the new school of the village in 2014.

== Demographics ==
According to the 2002 census, the village had a total of 108 inhabitants. Ethnic groups in the village include:

- Macedonians 23
- Turks 85

As of 2021, the village of Shashvarlija has 79 inhabitants and the ethnic composition was the following:

- Turks - 67
- Macedonians – 10
- Albanians – 1
- Person without Data - 1
