= Dolni Stubol =

Dolni Stubol Долни Стубол
- Village
- Location within North Macedonia
- Coordinates: 41.999466°N 22.121431°E
- Country: North Macedonia
- Region: Eastern
- Municipality: Probištip

Population (2002)
  - Total: 168
- Time zone: UTC+1 (CET)
  - Summer (DST): UTC+2 (CEST)
- Website: .

Dolni Stubol (Macedonian: Долни Стубол) is a village in the municipality of Probištip, North Macedonia.

== Demographics ==
According to the 2002 census, the village had a total of 168 inhabitants. Ethnic groups in the village include:

- Macedonians 167
- Other 1
