= Dobrevo, North Macedonia =

Dobrevo Добрево
- Village
- Location within North Macedonia
- Coordinates: 42.024090°N 22.197688°E
- Country: North Macedonia
- Region: Eastern
- Municipality: Probištip

Population (2002)
  - Total: 340
- Time zone: UTC+1 (CET)
  - Summer (DST): UTC+2 (CEST)
- Website: .

Dobrevo (Macedonian: Добрево) is a village in the municipality of Probištip, North Macedonia.

== Demographics ==
According to the 2002 census, the village had a total of 340 inhabitants. Ethnic groups in the village include:

- Macedonians 336
- Turks 2
- Other 2
