= Selce, Štip =

Selce Селце
- Village
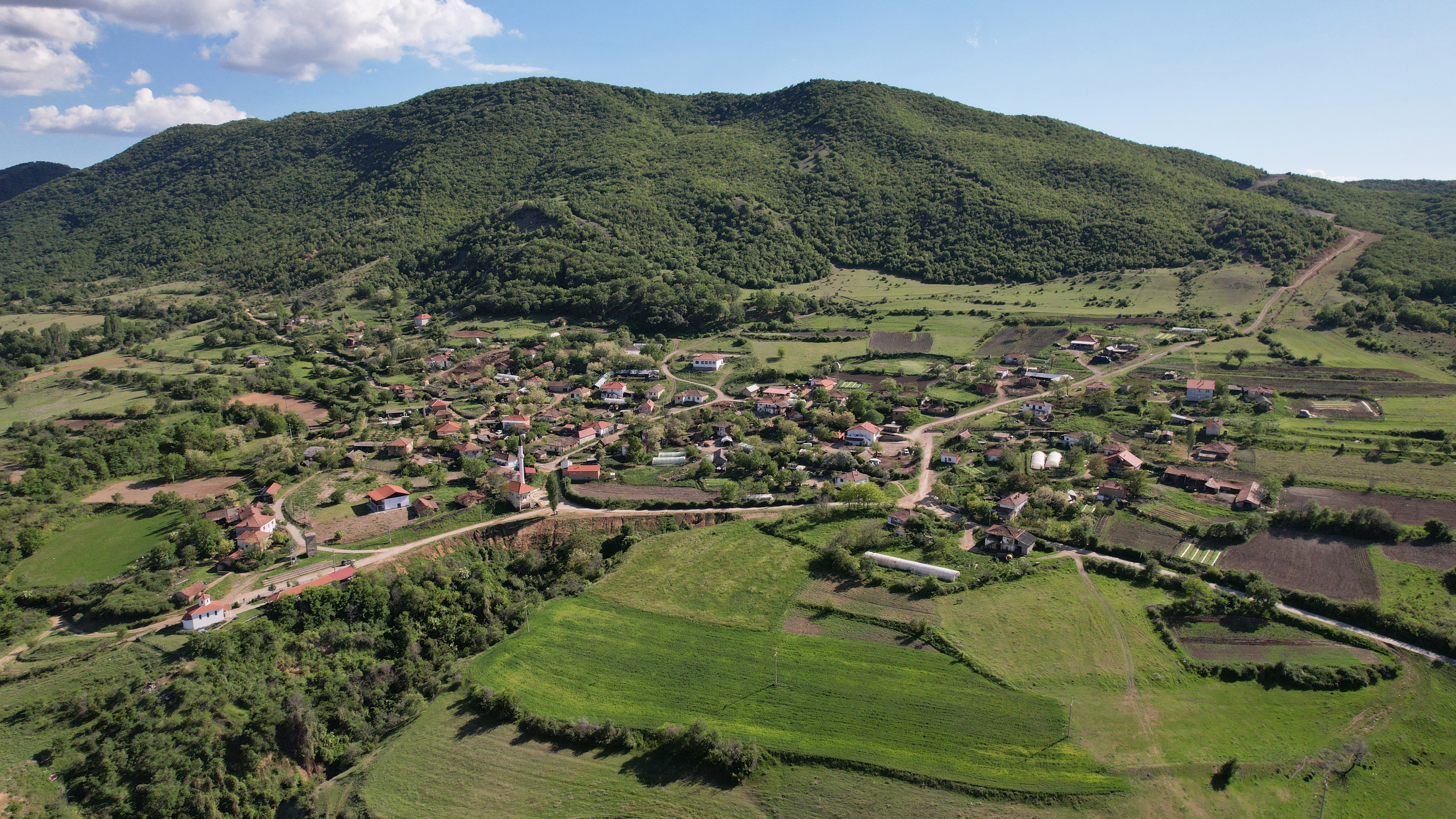
- Air view of the village

- Location within North Macedonia
- Coordinates: 41.649773°N 22.171447°E
- Country: North Macedonia
- Region: Eastern
- Municipality: Štip

Population (2021)
  - Total: 140
- Time zone: UTC+1 (CET)
  - Summer (DST): UTC+2 (CEST)
- Website: .

Selce (Macedonian: Селце) is a village in the municipality of Štip, North Macedonia.

== Demographics ==
As of the 2021 census, Selce had 140 residents with the following ethnic composition:

- Turks 107
- Persons for whom data are taken from administrative sources 16
- Macedonians 15
- Serbs 2

According to the 2002 census, the village had a total of 169 inhabitants. Ethnic groups in the village include:

- Turks 146
- Macedonians 18
- Serbs 5
