= Strmoš =

Strmoš Стрмош
- Village
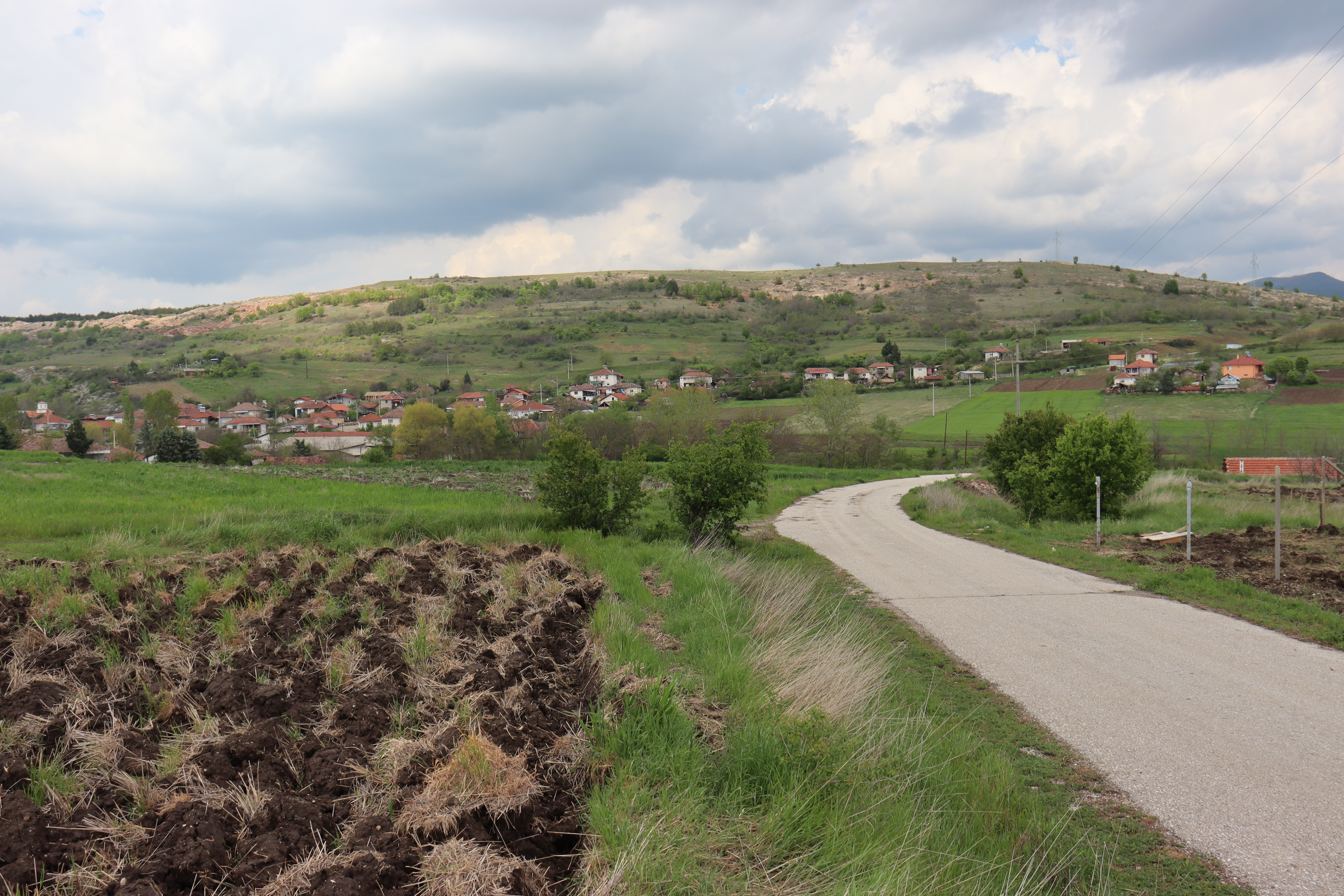
- Panoramic view of the village

- Location within North Macedonia
- Coordinates: 41.981560°N 22.162380°E
- Country: North Macedonia
- Region: Eastern
- Municipality: Probištip

Population (2002)
  - Total: 294
- Time zone: UTC+1 (CET)
  - Summer (DST): UTC+2 (CEST)
- Website: .

Strmoš (Macedonian: Стрмош) is a village in the municipality of Probištip, North Macedonia.

== Demographics ==
According to the 2002 census, the village had a total of 294 inhabitants. Ethnic groups in the village include:

- Macedonians: 294
