= Čardaklija =

Čardaklija Чардаклија
- Village
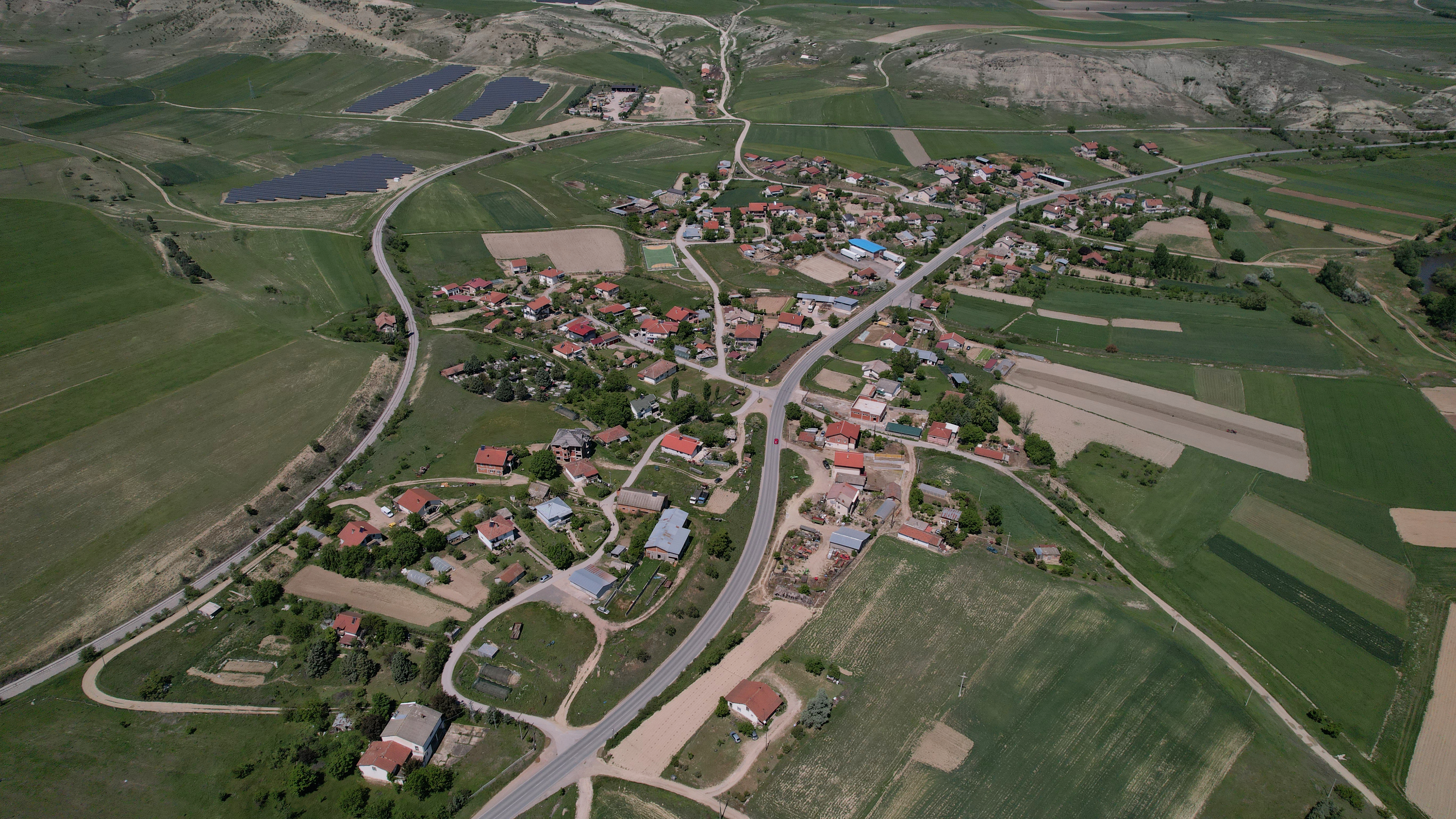
- Air view of the village

- Location within North Macedonia
- Coordinates: 41.781221°N 22.185498°E
- Country: North Macedonia
- Region: Eastern
- Municipality: Štip

Population (2021)
  - Total: 262
- Time zone: UTC+1 (CET)
  - Summer (DST): UTC+2 (CEST)
- Website: .

Čardaklija (Macedonian: Чардаклија) (Turkish: Çardaklı) is a village in the municipality of Štip, North Macedonia.

== Demographics ==
According to the 2002 census, the village had a total of 922 inhabitants. Ethnic groups in the village include:

- Macedonians 839
- Turks 22
- Serbs 2
- Romani 10
- Aromanians 41
- Others 8

As of 2021, the village of Chardaklija has 262 inhabitants and the ethnic composition was the following:

- Macedonians – 191
- Aromanians - 37
- Turks – 9
- Romani – 8
- Person without Data - 17
