= Piperovo, North Macedonia =

Piperеvo Пиперево
- Location within North Macedonia
- Coordinates: 41.473699°N 22.673401°E
- Country: North Macedonia
- Region: Southeastern
- Municipality: Vasilevo

Population
  - Total: 1,401
- Time zone: UTC+1 (CET)
  - Summer (DST): UTC+2 (CEST)

Piperevo (Macedonian: Пиперево) is a village in the municipality of Vasilevo, North Macedonia.

== Demographics ==
According to the 2002 census, the village had a total of 1,401 inhabitants. Ethnic groups in the village include:

- Macedonians 1,260
- Turks 139
- Others 2

As of 2021, the village of Piperevo has 1.158 inhabitants and the ethnic composition was the following:

- Macedonians – 957
- Turks – 101
- others – 5
- Person without Data - 95
