= Boletin, Mavrovo i Rostuše =

Boletin Болетин
- Village
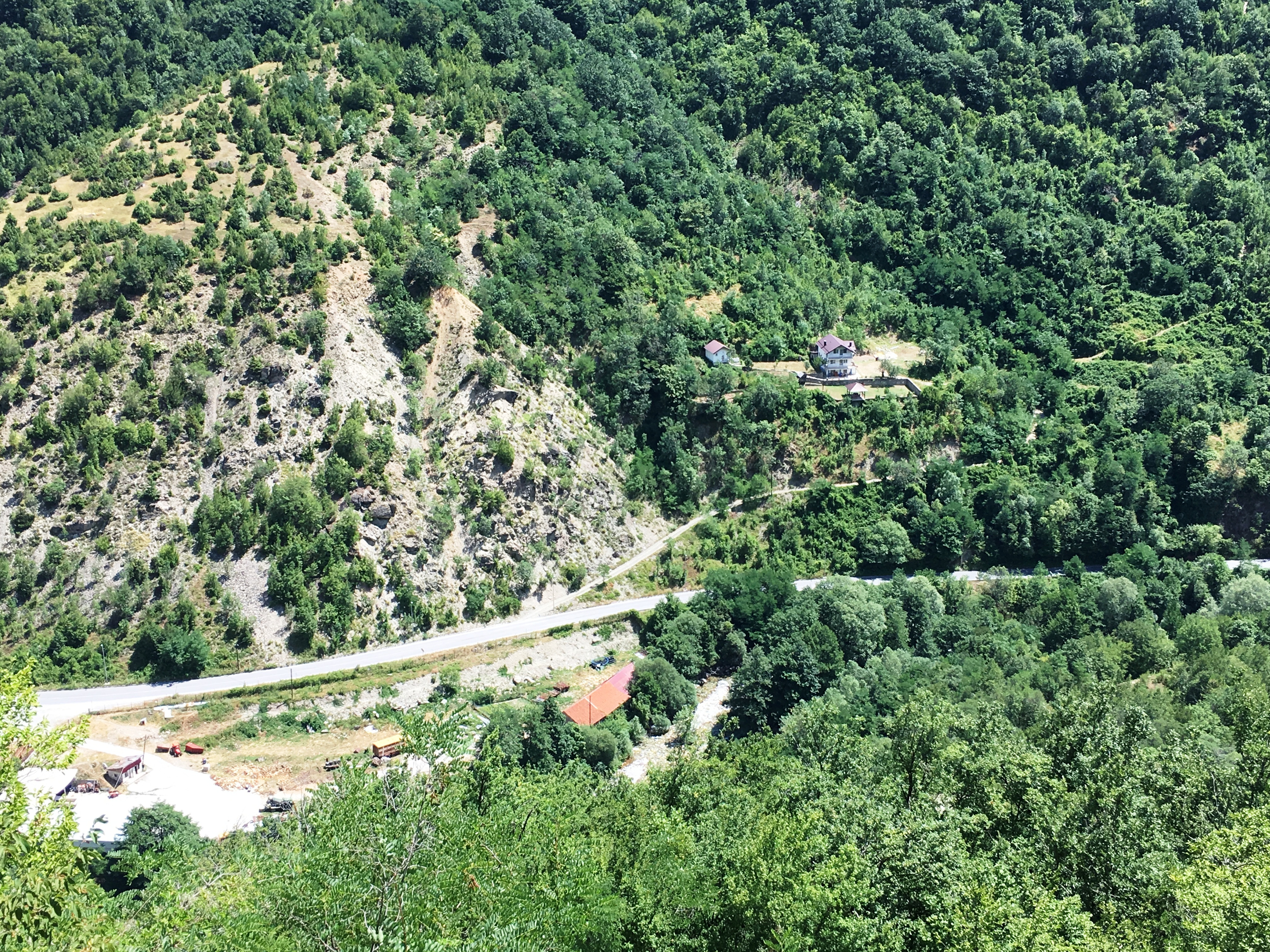
- View of the remnants of the village

- Location within North Macedonia
- Coordinates: 41°39′27″N 20°36′06″E
- Country: North Macedonia
- Region: Polog
- Municipality: Mavrovo and Rostušе

Population (2002)
  - Total: 0
- Time zone: UTC+1 (CET)
  - Summer (DST): UTC+2 (CEST)
- Car plates: GV
- Website: .

Boletin (Macedonian: Болетин) is an abandoned village in the municipality of Mavrovo and Rostušе, North Macedonia.

== History ==
Due to uprisings in the Upper Reka region, Boletin was burned down by Serbian and Bulgarian forces between 1912 and 1916.

== Demographics ==
Boletin (Nulitin) is attested in the Ottoman defter of 1467 as a village in the ziamet of Reka which was under the authority of Karagöz Bey. The village had a total of five households and the anthroponyms recorded depict an exclusively Albanian character: Orogan Reçi, Kolë Reçi, Progon Sunda, Kola son of Budin, and Kolë Reçi.

In statistics gathered by Vasil Kanchov in 1900, the village of Boletin was inhabited by 330 Muslim Bulgarians. The 1948 Yugoslav census recorded 340 people in the village, all Albanians. The 1953 Yugoslav census recorded 390 people, of whom 201 were Macedonians, 176 Turks and 9 Albanians. The 1961 Yugoslav census which at that time was inhabited by 15 people, all Turks. The 1961 census marks the last time inhabitants were registered in the settlement. In the second half of the 20th century the village was populated by a Torbeš community.

According to the 2002 census, the village had a total of 0 inhabitants.
