= Štip Municipality =

Municipality of North Macedonia

Coordinates: 41.75°N 22.20°E

Municipality of Štip Општина Штип
- Urban municipality
- Flag Coat of arms

- Country: North Macedonia
- Region: Eastern
- Municipal seat: Štip

Government
  - Mayor: Ivan Jordanov (VMRO-DPMNE)

Area
  - Total: 583.24 km^{2} (225.19 sq mi)

Population
  - Total: 44,866
  - Density: 76.925/km^{2} (199.24/sq mi)
- Time zone: UTC+1 (CET)
- Postal code: 2000
- Area code: 032
- Vehicle registration: ST
- Website: http://www.stip.gov.mk

Štip (Macedonian: Штип [ʃtip]) is a municipality in eastern North Macedonia. Štip is also the name of the town where the municipal seat is found. This municipality is part of the Eastern Statistical Region.

== Geography ==
Štip Municipality covers an area of 583.24 km^{2}. The river Bregalnica runs through the municipality.

The municipality borders

- Probištip Municipality and Sveti Nikole Municipality to the north,
- Radoviš and Karbinci municipalities to the east,
- Lozovo and Gradsko municipalities to the west, and
- Konče Municipality to the south.

== Demographics ==
At the census taken in 1994 the number of inhabitants was 46,372 and in 2002 the number of inhabitants was 47,796.

According to the 2021 North Macedonia census, this municipality has 44,866 inhabitants. Ethnic groups in the municipality:

	2002		2021	
	Number	%	Number	%
TOTAL	47,796	100	44,866	100
Macedonians	41,670	87.18	34,752	77.46
Roma	2,195	4.59	2,301	5.13
Vlachs	2,074	4.34	1,584	3.53
Turks	1,272	2.66	1,334	2.97
Serbs	297	0.62	172	0.38
Albanians	12	0.03	33	0.07
Bosniaks	11	0.02	12	0.03
Other / Undeclared / Unknown	265	0.56	293	0.66
Persons for whom data are taken from administrative sources			4,385	9.77

== Inhabited places ==
The number of the inhabited places in the municipality is 44.

Inhabited places in Štip Municipality
Villages: Baltalija | Brest | Čardaklija | Čiflik | Creška | Goračino | Dobrošani | Dolani | Edeklerci | Hadji-Redjepli | Hadji-Sejdeli | Hadji-Hamzali | Jamularci | Kalapetrovci | Koeševo | Krivi Dol | Lakavica | Leskovica | Lipov Dol | Ljuboten | Nikoman | Novo Selo | Penuš | Piperovo | Počivalo | Puhče | Sarčievo | Šašavarlija | Selce | Skandalci | Sofilari | Šopur | Star Karaorman | Stepanci | Suvo Grlo | Sudikj | Suševo | Tanatarci | Testemelci | Toplikj | Tri Češmi | Vrsakovo Towns: Štip
