= Probištip =

Probištip Пробиштип (Macedonian)
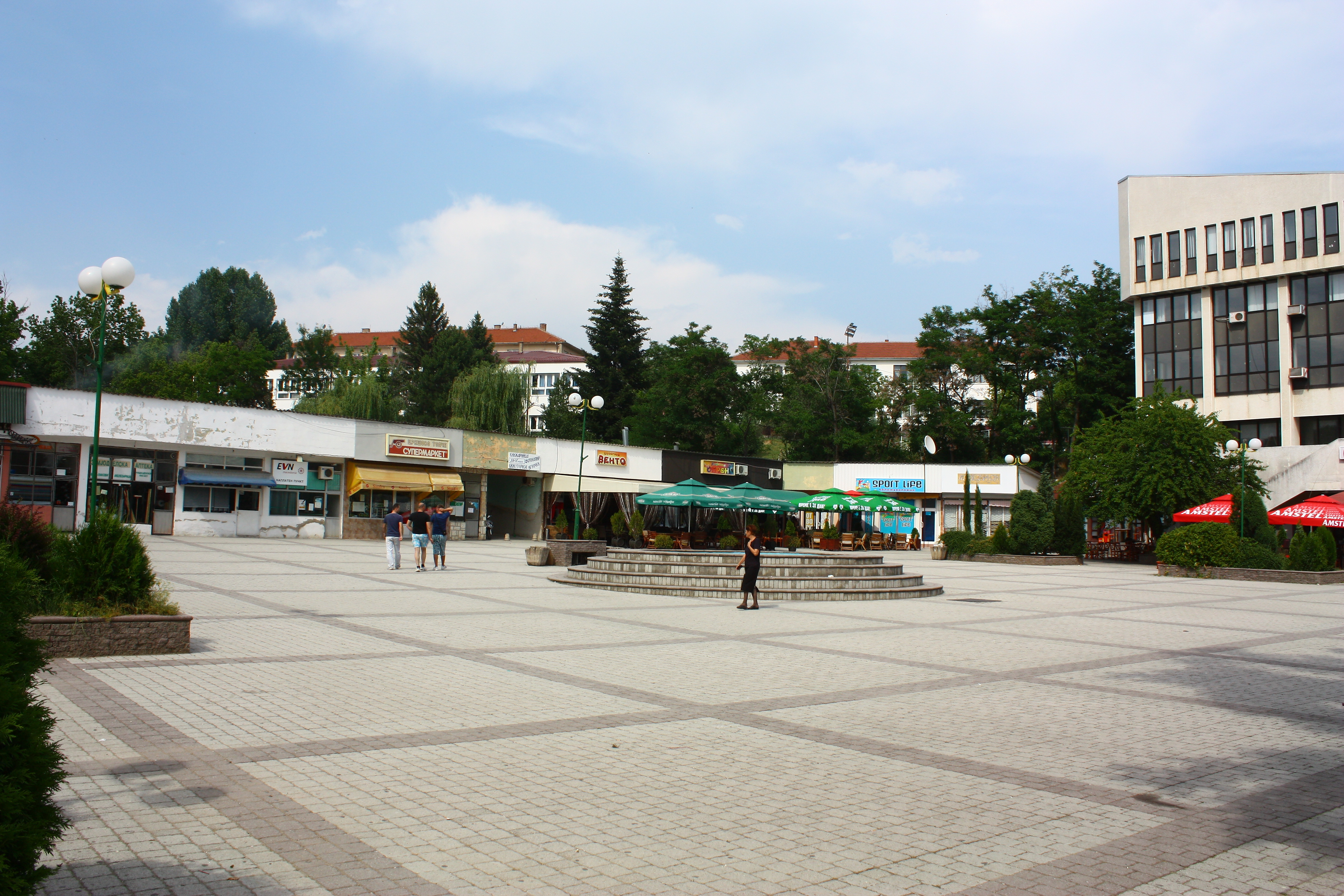
- Probištip City Square

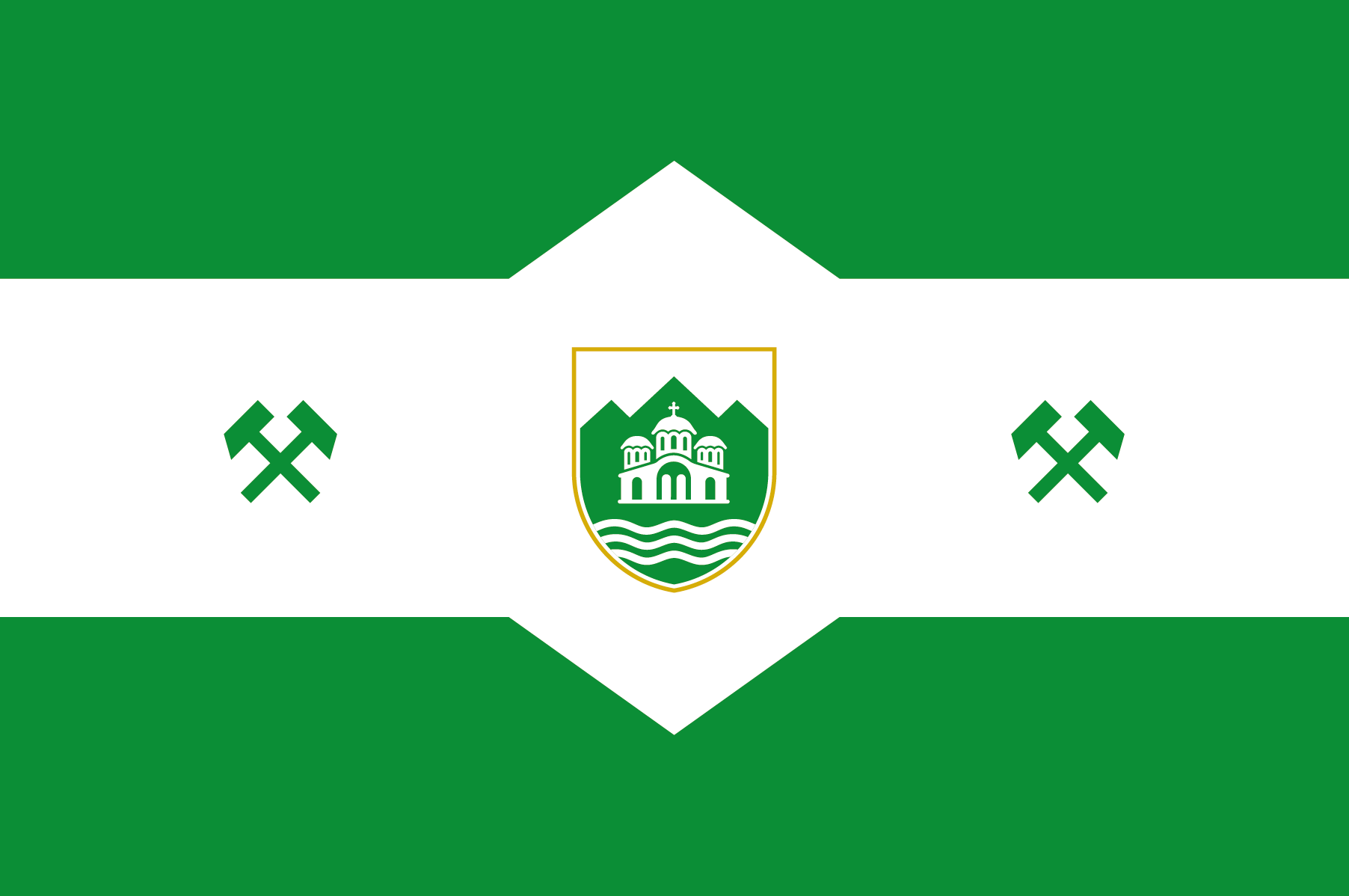
- Flag Coat of arms

- Location within North Macedonia
- Coordinates: 42°00′N 22°09′E
- Country: North Macedonia
- Region: Eastern
- Municipality: Probištip

Government
  - Mayor: Dragan Anastasov (SDSM)

Population (2002)
  - Total: 10,826
- Time zone: UTC+1 (CET)
  - Summer (DST): UTC+2 (CEST)
- Postal code: 2210
- Area code: +389 032
- Vehicle registration: PS
- Climate: Cfb
- Website: www.Probistip.gov.mk/

Probištip (Macedonian: Пробиштип [ˈprɔbiʃtip]) is a city in North Macedonia, and seat of Probištip Municipality. The city has a population of 10,826.

== Features ==
Probištip is located in the southwest corner of the Osogovo Mountains, in northeastern North Macedonia. The region has been well-known since Roman times for its mineral wealth and mining industry, which flourished during Yugoslav times. It has a long tradition of hearty country eating, and is close to both the monastery of Gabriel Lesnovski (dedicated to St. Archangel Michael and St. Gavril Lesnovski) and the stone formations of Kuklica. The mines of Zletovo provide most of the natural materials that are processed in Probištip.

== History ==
The history of Probištip and its vicinity comprises the building and the existence of the Lesnovo monastery, which is today one of the most important and most valuable monuments of culture in North Macedonia.

== Sports ==
Local football club FK Rudar plays in the Macedonian Third League.

== Twin cities ==
- Komádi – Hungary
- Mioveni – Romania
