= Lakavica, Gostivar =

Lakavica Лакавица Llakavicë
- Village
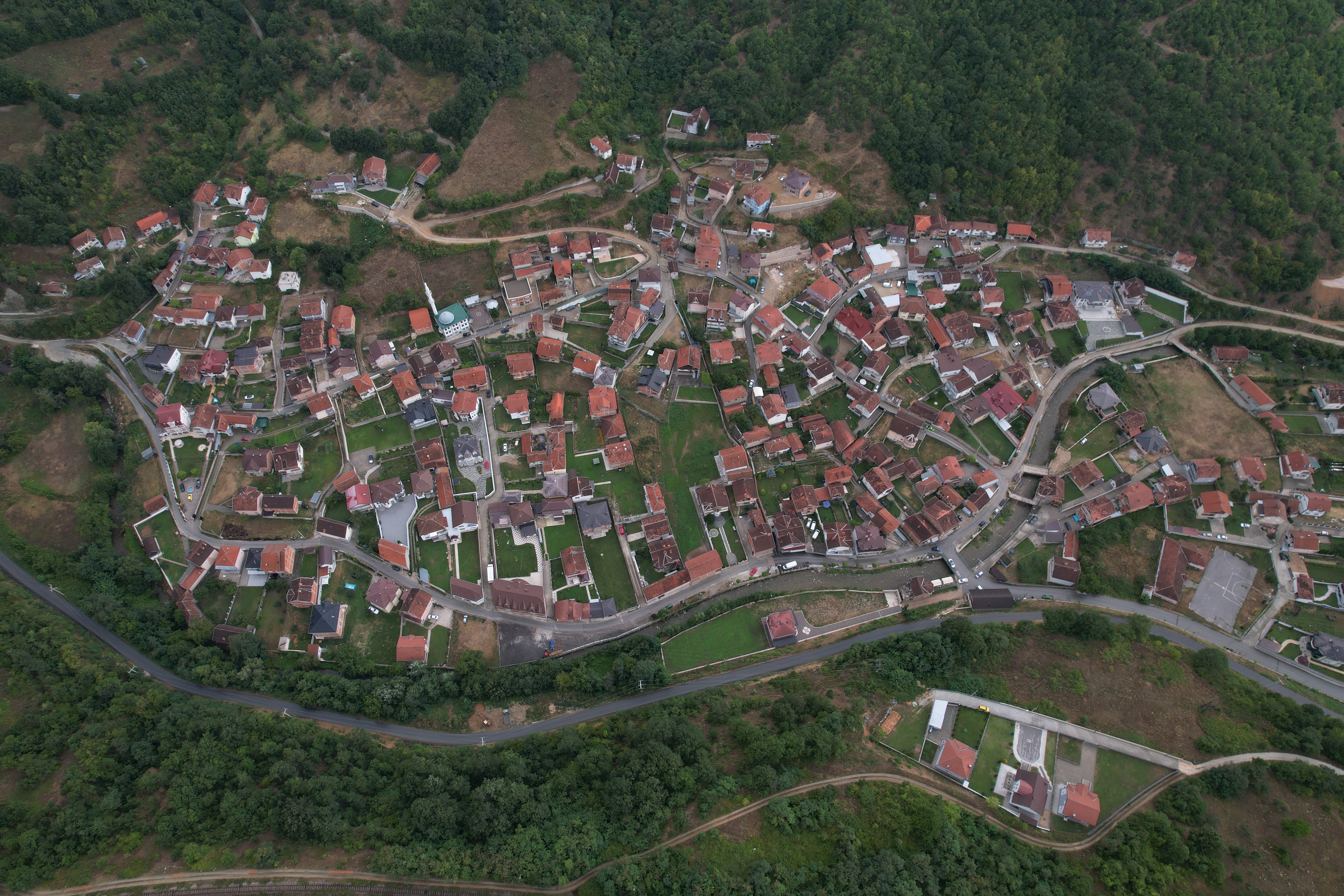
- Airview of the village Lakavica

- Location within North Macedonia
- Coordinates: 41°44′47″N 20°55′24″E
- Country: North Macedonia
- Region: Polog
- Municipality: Gostivar

Population (2021)
  - Total: 522
- Time zone: UTC+1 (CET)
  - Summer (DST): UTC+2 (CEST)
- Car plates: GV
- Website: .

Lakavica (Macedonian: Лакавица, Albanian: Llakavicë) is a village in the municipality of Gostivar, North Macedonia.

== Demographics ==
As of the 2021 census, Lakavica had 522 residents with the following ethnic composition:

- Albanians 507
- Persons for whom data are taken from administrative sources 14
- Others 1

According to the 2002 census, the village had a total of 994 inhabitants. Ethnic groups in the village include:

- Albanians 990
- Others 4

According to the 1942 Albanian census, Lakavica was inhabited by 660 Muslim Albanians.
