= Lakavica, Štip =

Lakavica Лакавица
- Village
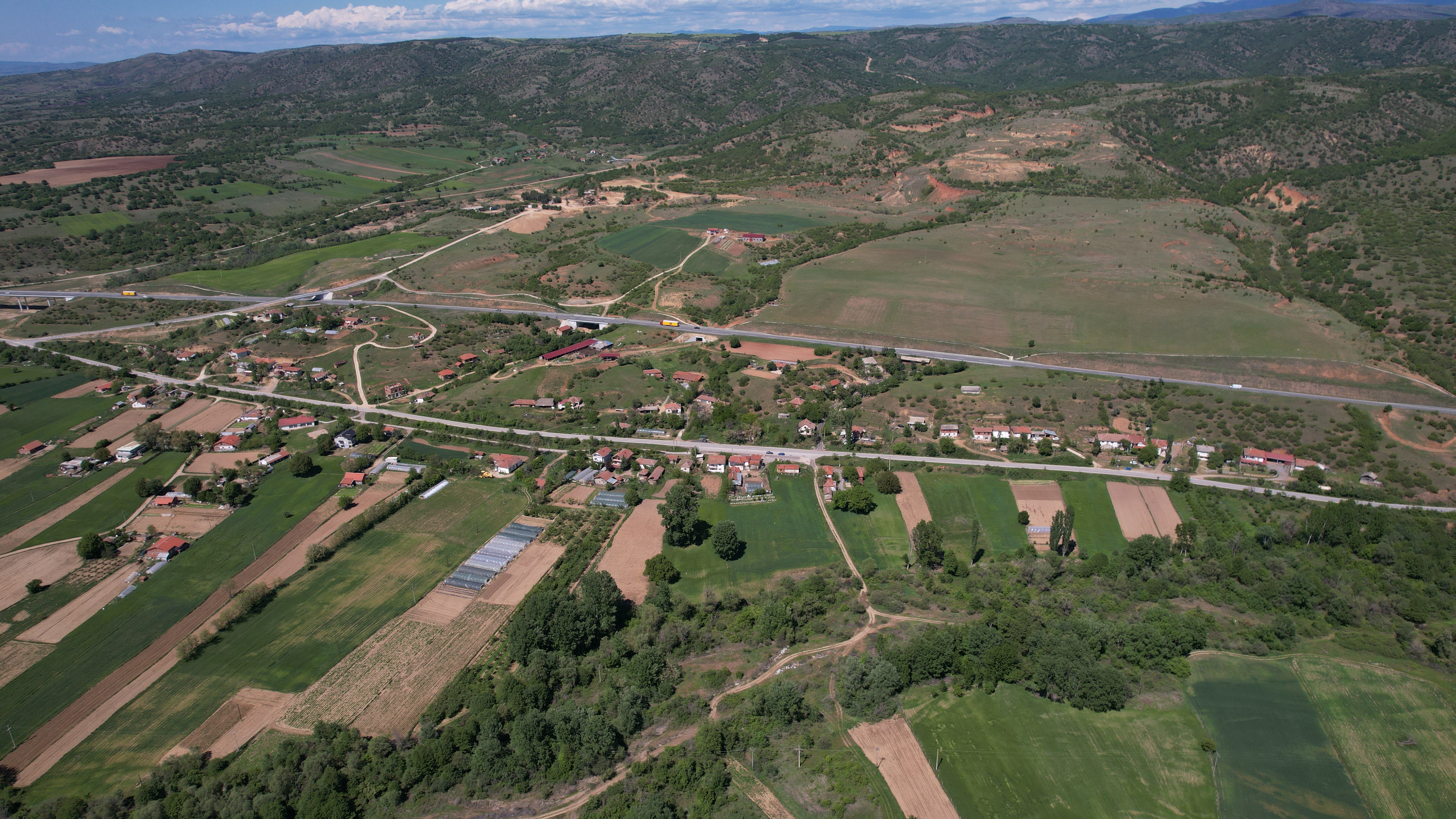
- Air view of the village

- Location within North Macedonia
- Coordinates: 41.652010°N 22.236927°E
- Country: North Macedonia
- Region: Eastern
- Municipality: Štip

Population (2002)
  - Total: 139
- Time zone: UTC+1 (CET)
  - Summer (DST): UTC+2 (CEST)
- Website: .

Lakavica (Macedonian: Лакавица) is a village in the municipality of Štip, North Macedonia.

== Demographics ==
According to the 2002 census, the village had a total of 139 inhabitants. Ethnic groups in the village include:

- Macedonians 107
- Turks 24
- Serbs 8

As of 2021, the village of Lakavica has 123 inhabitants and the ethnic composition was the following:

- Macedonians – 76
- Turks - 36

Albanians – 3

- Serbs – 1
- Person without Data - 7
