= Zelengrad =

Settlement in Zadar County, Croatia

- Settlement
- Interactive map of Zelengrad
- Location of Zelengrad in Croatia
- Coordinates: 44°08′22″N 15°43′20″E
- Country: Croatia
- County: Zadar County
- City: Obrovac

Area
  - Total: 25.0 km^{2} (9.7 sq mi)

Population (2021)
  - Total: 73
  - Density: 2.9/km^{2} (7.6/sq mi)
- Time zone: UTC+1 (CET)
  - Summer (DST): UTC+2 (CEST)
- Postal code: 23450 Obrovac

Zelengrad is a settlement in the City of Obrovac in Croatia. In 2021, its population was 73.

== Demographics ==
Zelengrad: Population trends 1857–2021
v

population	373	411	463	522	597	625	471	717	575	664	688	624	558	512	44	77	73
	1857	1869	1880	1890	1900	1910	1921	1931	1948	1953	1961	1971	1981	1991	2001	2011	2021

Sources: Croatian Bureau of Statistics publications
