= Zletovo =

Zletovo Злетово
- Village
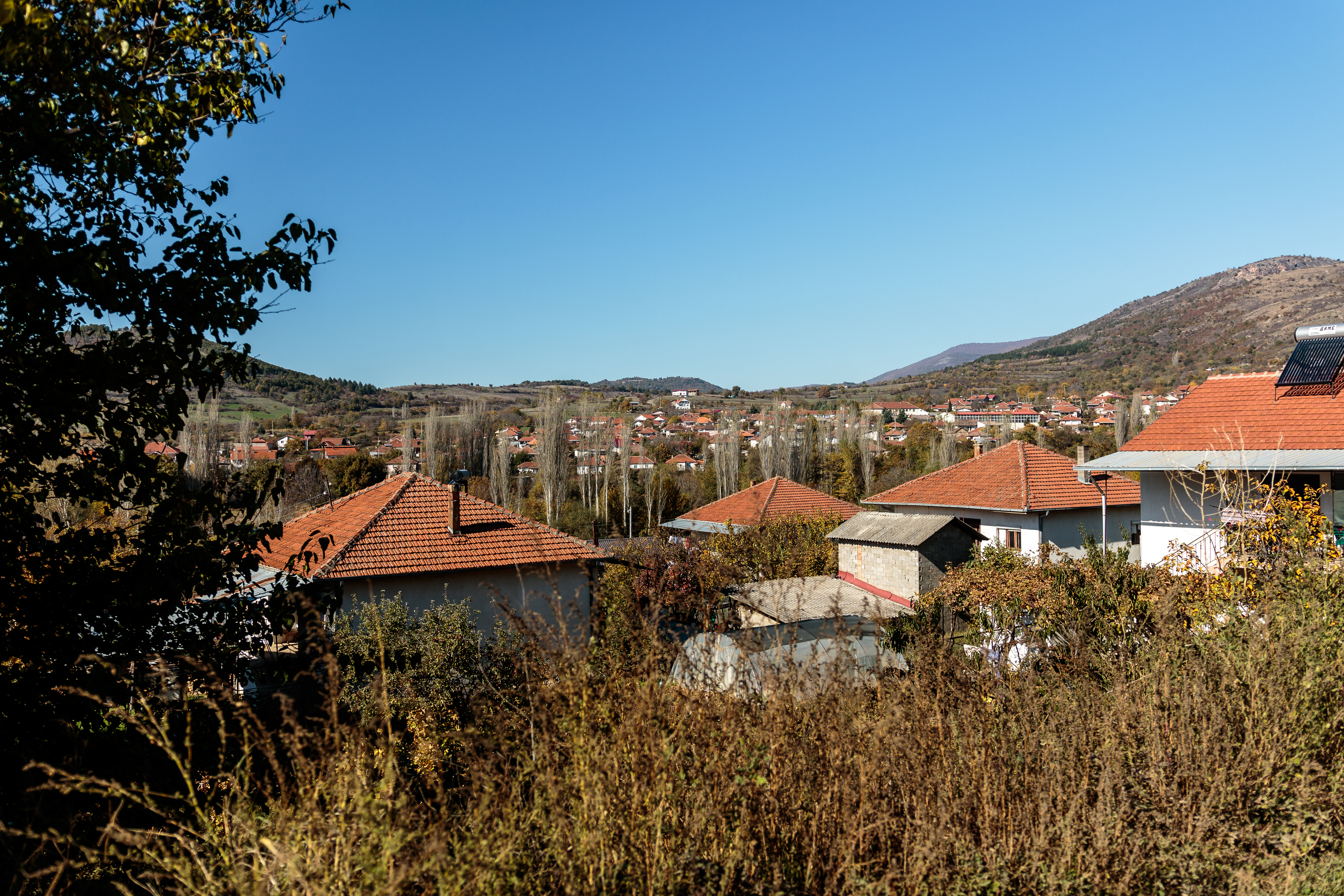
- Panoramic view of Zletovo

- Location within North Macedonia
- Country: North Macedonia
- Region: Eastern
- Municipality: Probištip

Area
  - Total: 10.4 km^{2} (4.0 sq mi)
- Elevation: 480 m (1,570 ft)

Population (2021)
  - Total: 2,036
  - Density: 196/km^{2} (507/sq mi)
- Time zone: UTC+1 (CET)
  - Summer (DST): UTC+2 (CEST)

Zletovo (Macedonian: Злетово) is a village in the municipality of Probištip, North Macedonia. It was the seat of the now-abolished Zletovo Municipality and is the seat of the Zletovo Parish of the Macedonian Orthodox Church. According to the 2021 census, it had a population of 2,036.

== Etymology ==
The name Zletovo is derived from the personal name *Злѧта (Zlęta), which developed from the personal name Зълъ (Zǎlǎ) with the suffix -ѧта (-ęta). It can be compared with the personal name Милета (Mileta) < Милѧта (Milęta) and the place name Болетино (Boletino) which comes from Болета (Boleta) < Болѧта (Bolęta), which has a parallel in the Russian place name Болятино (Bolyatino).

== History ==
One of the neighborhoods of the village bears the name Arvanik, which stems from the Proto-Albanian arb, arban but with the Greek phonetic development rb → rv and with the suffix -ik, resulting in the form Arvanik. The neighborhood was inhabited by Albanians and was named accordingly by the Byzantine administration.

Zletovo as a settlement is first mentioned as Συλετοβά (Syletová) in 1019 in a chrysobull (charter) by Basil II where he determined the diocese of the then Morodvis Bishopric. It is mentioned again in 1330 as въ хорѣ злѧтовстѣи (vǎ horě zlętovstěi) and in 1353 it is mentioned as вь земли слѧтовскои (vǐ zemli slętovskoi). A 1378 charter by Ivan and Konstantin Dragaš mentions the village as Злетово. Zletovshtica (Zletovska River) is mentioned as на Злетовштице (na Zletovshtitse) in 1558.

Vasil Kanchov recorded a population of 670 Christian Bulgarians, 230 Turks, and 20 Roma in the village in 1900. In 1905, Secretary of the Bulgarian Exarchate, Dimitar Mishev (Note: Dimitar Mishev wrote under the pseudonym "Brancoff".) recorded 776 Exarchist Bulgarians and 184 Serbian Patriarchists in the village. Mishev documented one Bulgarian primary school with two teachers and 64 students, and one Serbian primary school with two teachers and 12 students.

In 1917, Злѣтово was part of Злѣтовска община (Zletovska Municipality) under Bulgarian occupation. The settlement had a recorded population of 803, while the municipality itself had 2,350 inhabitants.

In 1996, the village was part of the Zletovo Municipality. Following the dissolution of the municipality in 2004, it became part of the Probištip Municipality.

== Geography ==
Zletovo is located in the Probištip Municipality (Note: In the source from 1998, the village is listed as the seat of the Zletovo Municipality. However, the Municipality was abolished in 2004 and Zletovo became part of the Probištip Municipality.) in the valley of the Zletovska River. It is a large settlement with an area of 10.4 square kilometers and can be thought of as a small town. It has an elevation of 480 meters.

== Economy ==
Zletovo's economy is based primarily on agriculture and animal husbandry, but it also includes a range of non-agricultural activities as well, making it a polyfunctional economic unit. It has 331.1 hectares of arable land, 441.9 hectares of pasture, and 148.5 hectares of forest.

The "Zletovica" hydrosystem was constructed near Zletovo, which supplies water to approximately 100,000 people from the municipalities of Kratovo, Probištip, Zletovo, (Note: Zletovo Municipality was abolished in 2004.) Štip, Karbinci, Sveti Nikole, and Lozovo, irrigation for over 4,500 hectares of agricultural land, and has an annual electricity generation of 45.5 GWh and a total installed capacity of 9.5 MW.

== Demographics ==
=== Ethnic groups ===
The ethnic composition of this village according to the censuses is as follows:

Ethnicity	Year							
Ethnicity	1953	1961	1971	1981	1991	1994	2002	2021
Macedonians	1,316	1,481	1,631	2,094	2,346	2,452	2,471	1,946
Albanians	0	0	0	0	0	0	0	1
Turks	2	0	0	0	0	0	0	—
Roma	0	—	0	1	0	0	0	—
Aromanians	0	—	—	0	0	0	1	1
Serbs	3	4	6	2	1	2	2	3
Bosniaks	—	—	—	—	—	—	0	—
Others	3	10	11	5	4	5	3	3
Total	1,324	1,495	1,648	2,102	2,351	2,459	2,477	2,036 (Note: The census recorded 82 "persons for whom the data has been obtained from administrative sources" in the village in 2021.)

=== Sex distribution ===
The populations of both sexes in the village according to the censuses is as follows:

Sex	Year							
Sex	1948	1953	1961	1971	1981	1991	1994	2002
Male	611	664	758	816	1,061	1,184	1,253	1,262
Female	621	660	737	832	1,041	1,167	1,206	1,215
