= Antenna 5 FM =

Antenna 5 Radio Network
- North Macedonia
- Frequencies: 95.5 MHz in Skopje; 92.9 MHz in Bitola, Prilep; 103.3 MHz in Ohrid; 106.9 MHz in Tetovo; 104.8 MHz in Štip, Radoviš; 100.5 MHz in Strumica

Programming
- Format: Contemporary hit radio

Ownership
- Owner: Zoran Petrov, Marjan Gusev, Kosta Janevski

History
- First air date: 1994

Links
- Website: www.antenna5.mk

Antenna 5 Radio Network (Macedonian: Антена 5) is a number 1 hits radio station in North Macedonia.

Antenna 5 Radio Network was founded in 1994 as a contemporary hits radio station. In 1999 it became the first private national radio station in the country. From its very beginning, Antenna 5 Radio Network was part of the European group radio stations that were part of the MTV Radio Network.

Antenna 5 covers more than 90% of the country. The audience of the radio station is the population mainly aged between 12 and 35 and living in urban areas.

According to research conducted in North Macedonia, Antenna 5 Radio Network has been the number one national radio station or the last 16 years.

== Major events ==
Antenna 5 Radio Network is part of the MTV Europe Music Awards, Brit Awards, Party In The Park, Mandela Day, Hard Rock Calling, Concert for NY, Concert for Diana, World Aid, Net Aid, Live Earth, Miami Winter Music Conference, Capital FM Jingle Bell Ball, Capital FM Summertime Ball, Exit Festival, InMusic Festival, Eurovision Song Contest.

Antenna 5 also covers and supports music and culture events in North Macedonia: Taksirat Festival, Pivolend, Makfest, Basker Fest, Off Fest, Skopje Jazz Festival, Ohrid Summer Festival, Skopje Summer Festival, ICCF Manaki Brothers, May Opera Evenings, Skopje Biennial.

Starting in 2003, Antenna 5 Radio Network has been broadcasting every season live from the studios in Ohrid and Mavrovo.

== Coverage ==
Antenna5 Radio Network covers 95% of the territory of North Macedonia with 20 transmitters with stereo RDS EON signal (that enables automatic change of the alternative frequencies while driving a car).

Skopje 95.5 FM Stereo with RDS, Veles 91.9, Bitola 92.9, Prilep 92.9; 106.3, Ohrid 103.3; 92.0, Gevgelija 89.2 FM; 106.3, Tetovo 106.9; 105.5, Struga 103.3 FM; 92.0, Strumica 100.5 FM; 91.9, Stip 104.8; 91.9, Kumanovo 106.3 FM; 106.9 FM; 104.8, Popova Sapka 106.9, Mavrovo 105.5; 95.5, Negotino 91.9 FM; 104.2 FM; 88.8, Kavadarci 104.2; 91.9, Demir Kapija 88.8; 91.9; 104.2, Sveti Nikole 91.9, Kriva Palanka 105.5; 95.5, Kratovo 105.5; 106.9, Gostivar 106.9; 105.5, Kocani 97.9; 104.8, Vinica 104.8; 97.9, Dojran 106.3, Valandovo 106.3, Bogdanci 106.3; 89.2, Radovis 91.9, Resen 92.9, Krusevo 106.3; 92.9, Galicnik 92.9, Kicevo 95.5, Berovo 97.9, Dolna Dusegubica 103.3, Pesočani 101.9, Mal Radobil 97.9 & Stracin 105.5 FM Stereo with RDS.
