= List of sports clubs named Flamurtari =

Several sports clubs are named Flamurtari. Almost all of them are association football clubs.

- Flamurtari FC, based in Vlorë, Albania
  - Flamurtari Vlorë Futsal, a futsal club
  - PBC Flamurtari, a basketball club
- KF Flamurtari, based in Pristina, Kosovo
- KF Flamurtari Debresh, based in Debreše, North Macedonia
- KF Flamurtari Ladorisht, based in Radolišta, North Macedonia
