= St Nicholas Church, Mavrovo =

Abandoned church in Mavrovo, North Macedonia

St Nicholas Church
- Свети Никола Летен
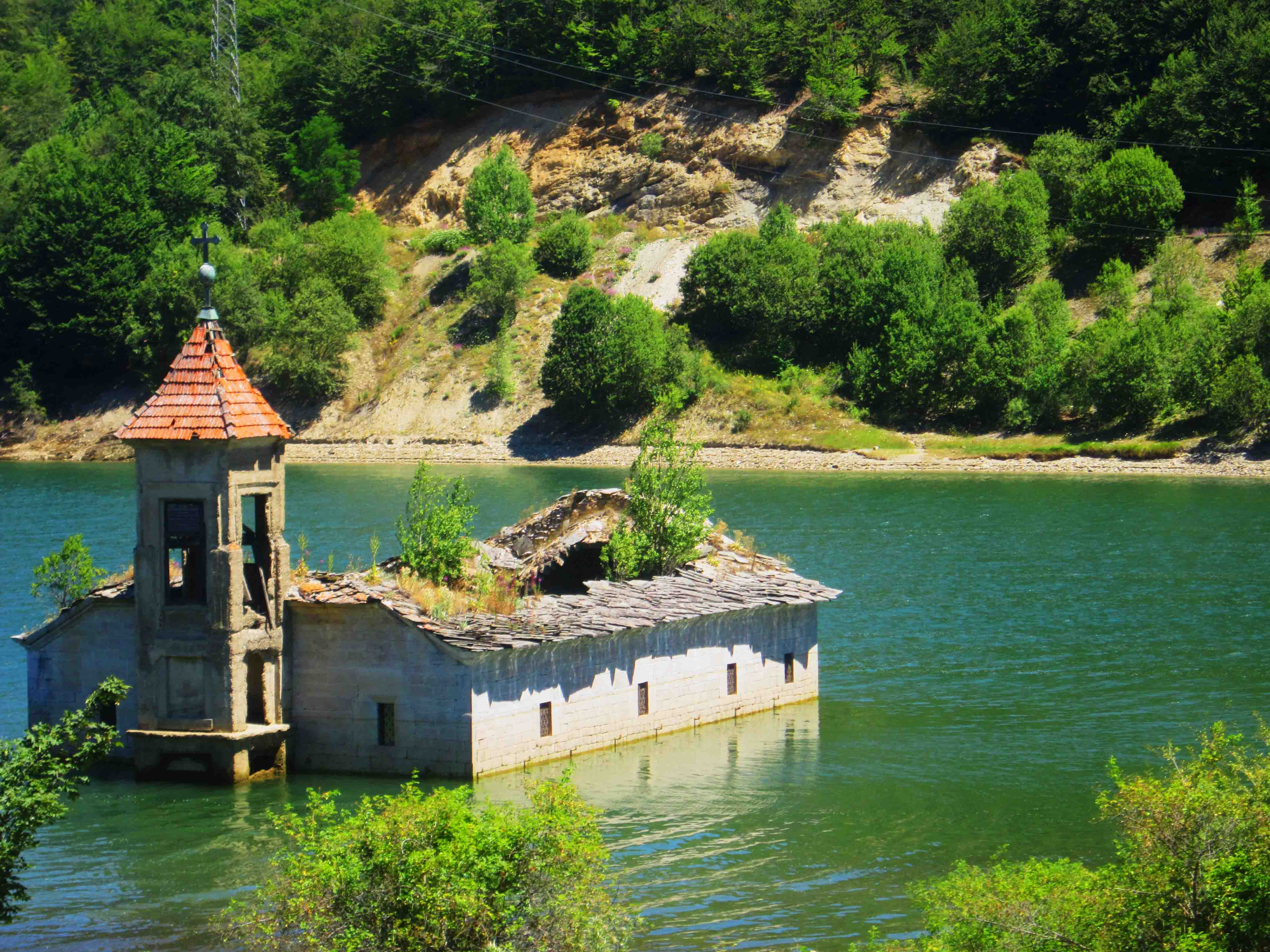
- View of the church submerged under water

Religion
- Affiliation: Macedonian Orthodox (Eastern Orthodox)

Location
- Location: Mavrovo, Mavrovo and Rostuša, North Macedonia
- Interactive map of St Nicholas Church
- Coordinates: 41°39′26″N 20°44′07″E

St Nicholas Church (Macedonian: Св. Никола Летен) is an abandoned church in Mavrovo, North Macedonia which is submerged in Mavrovo Lake. Built in 1850 with icons painted by Dicho Zograf, the church served as the main village church of Mavrovo. With the construction of the hydroelectric power station in Mavrovo and the artificial Mavrovo Lake, the church got submerged under water. During summer periods of drought, the church is accessible through land.

Despite being submerged in water, the church has preserved its initial construction. Its bell tower still exists, although the church's interior is destroyed and the roof has completely caved in.

== Construction ==
Construction work around the church started in 1850 by local construction workers from the Mavrovo region and the church was completed in 1857. Materials used to build the church included marble and granite. The altar was also made of marble. The iconostasis and the icons were painted in 1855 by painter Dicho Zograf of the Debar Art School movement, who in North Macedonia is seen as an ethnic Macedonian while in Bulgaria as a Bulgarian. Some were also later painted by Maletij Bozhinov. It was built with a five-sided apse, a bell tower and an iconostasis.

== Submersion ==
Towards the end of 1952, with the construction of the artificial Mavrovo Lake and the accompanying hydroelectric power station in the village of Mavrovo, the icons and other religious objects found inside the church were moved to the one located across it. During the submersion, the wooden iconostasis, icons, books and religious objects were forgotten inside although they were later taken and reconstructed. In 1953, the church was submerged in the lake. The following years, the church alternates between being partially submerged in water and accessible through land (mainly during summertime), depending on the water content of the lake.

== Reconstruction plans ==
In 2014, the Teatrix company from Skopje announced a plan to convert the church into a tourist attraction by sanctioning and protecting the church. Plans were also announced to keep the initial construction of the church, reconstruct the walls and the roof.

== Gallery ==
Inside

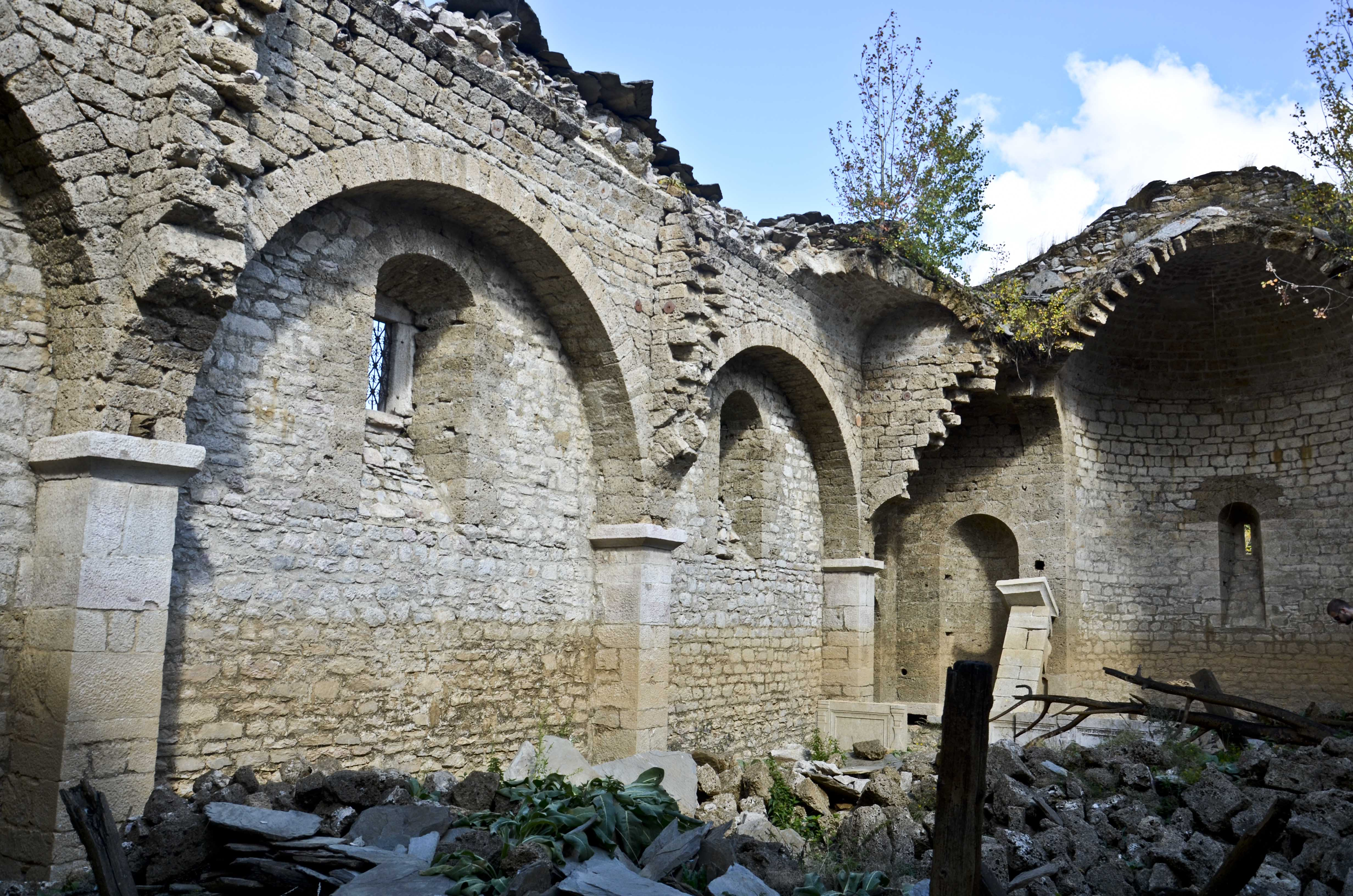
The inside of the church

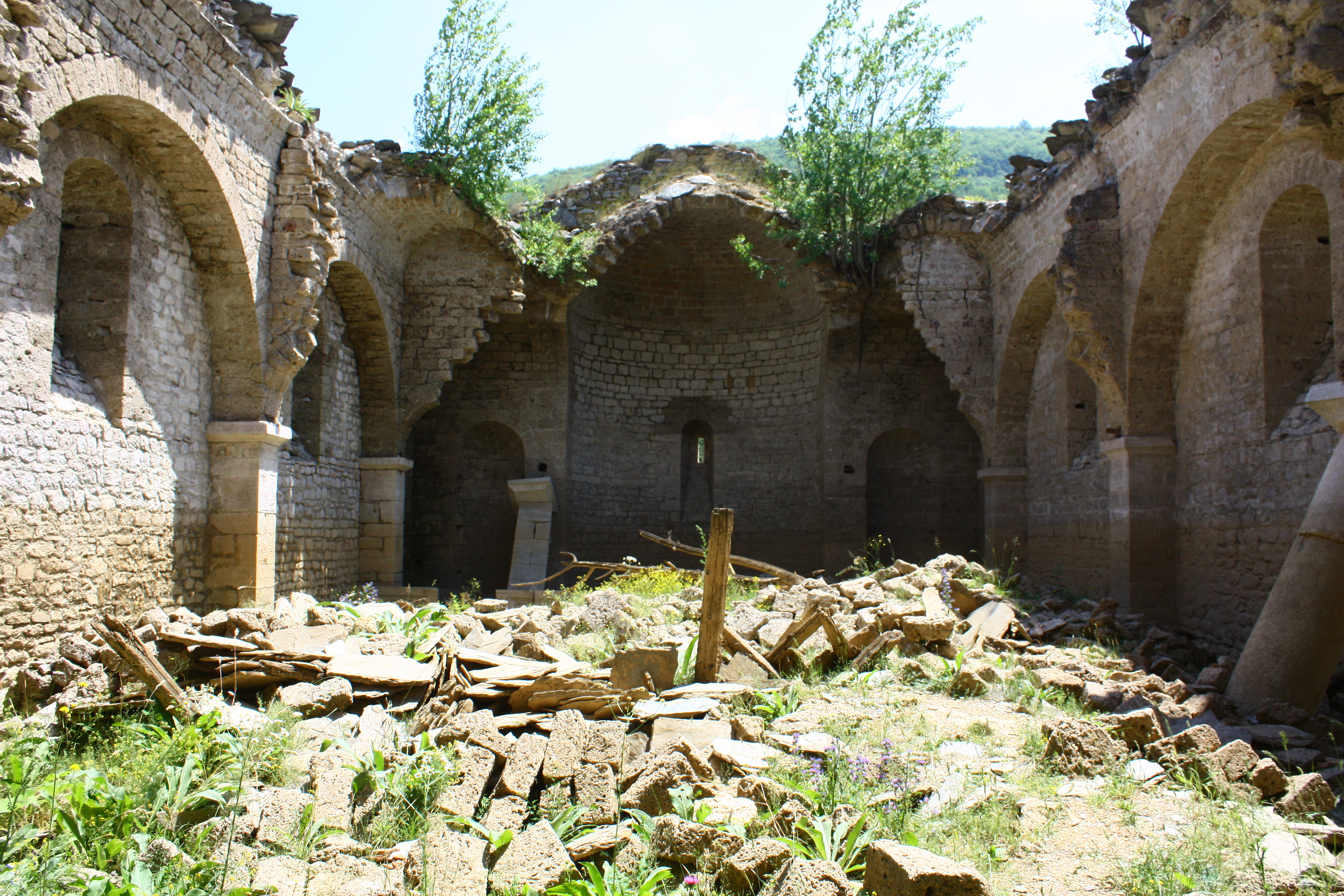
The inside of the church

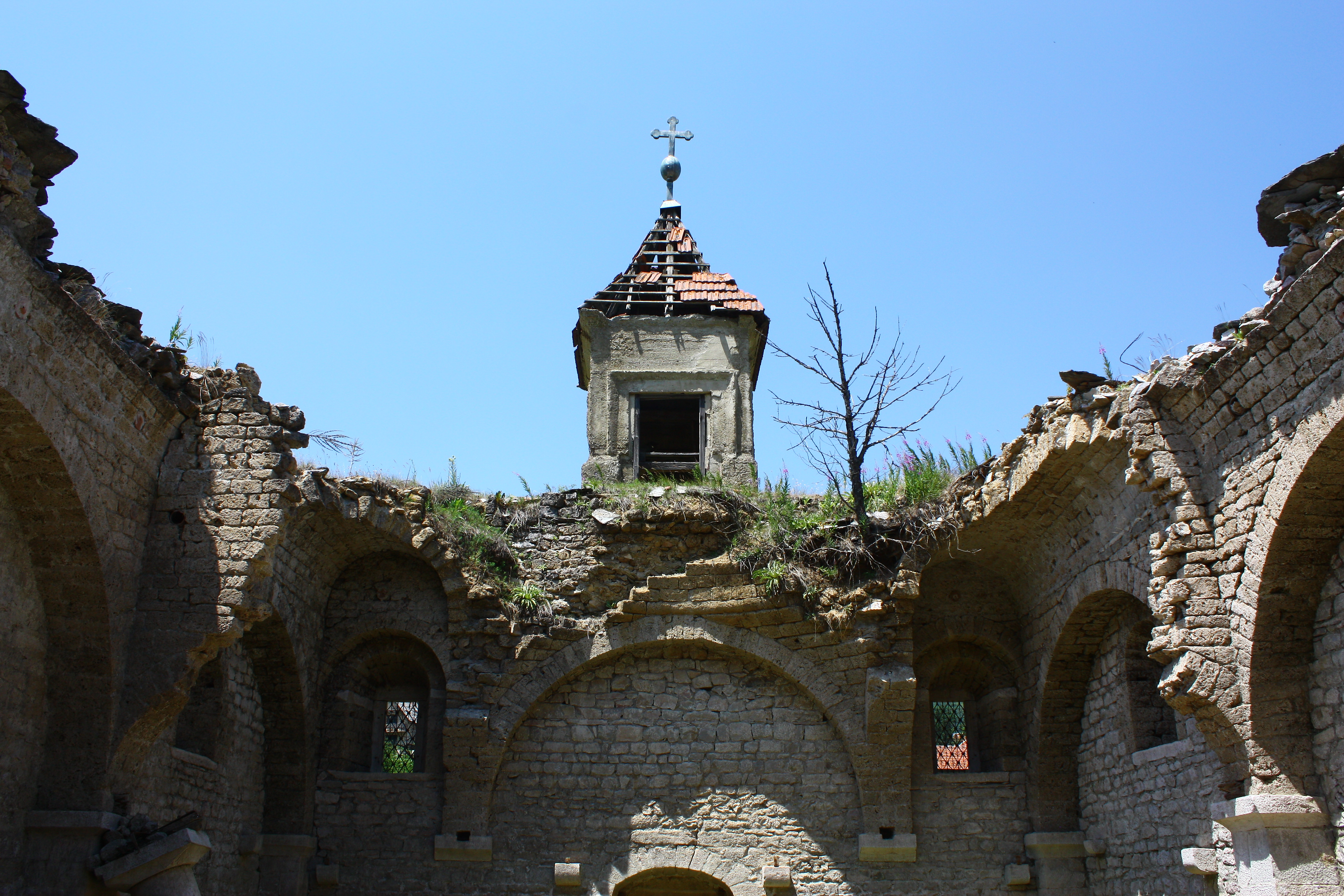
Look from inside to the bell tower of the church

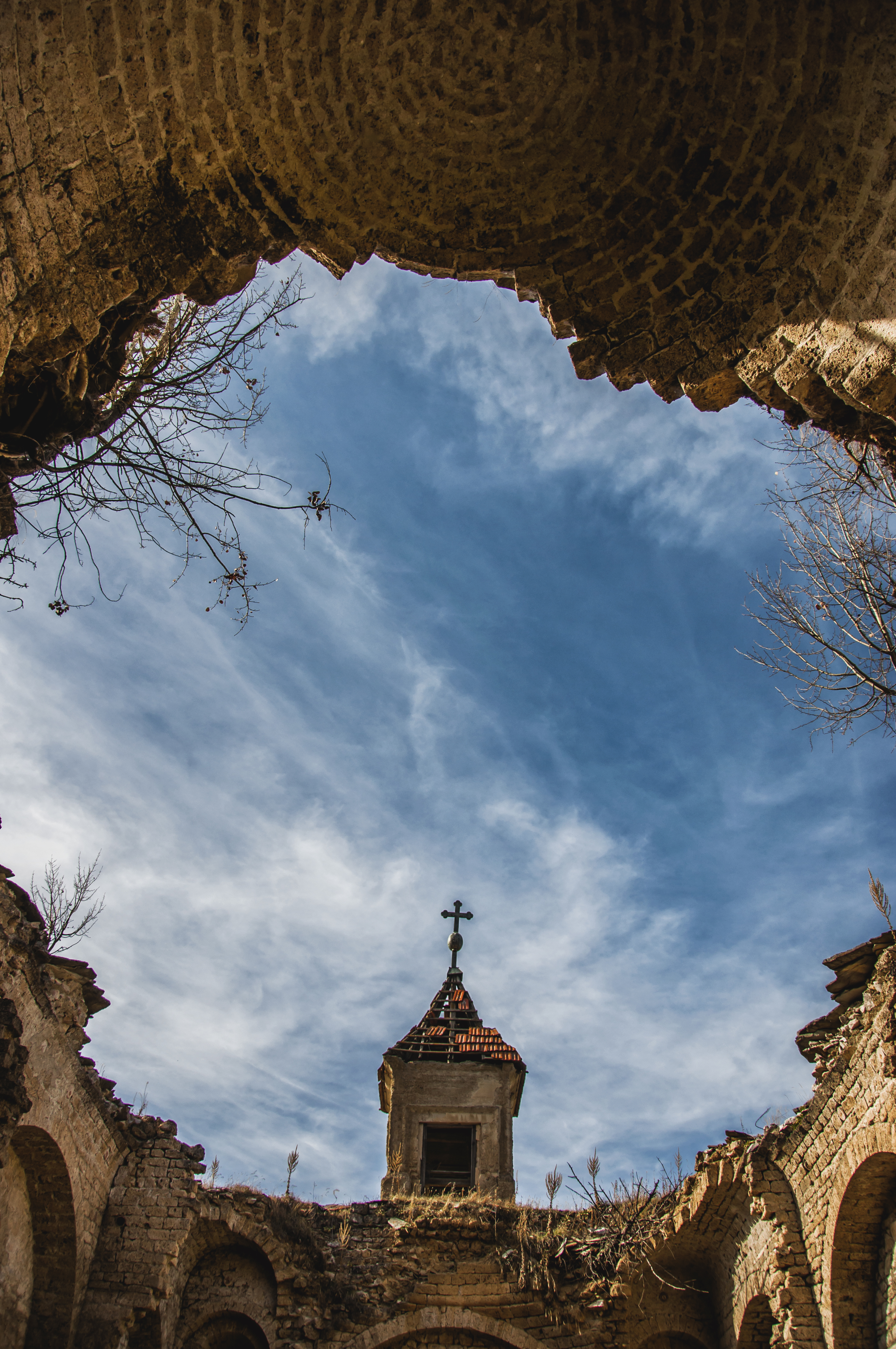
Look from inside to the bell tower of the church

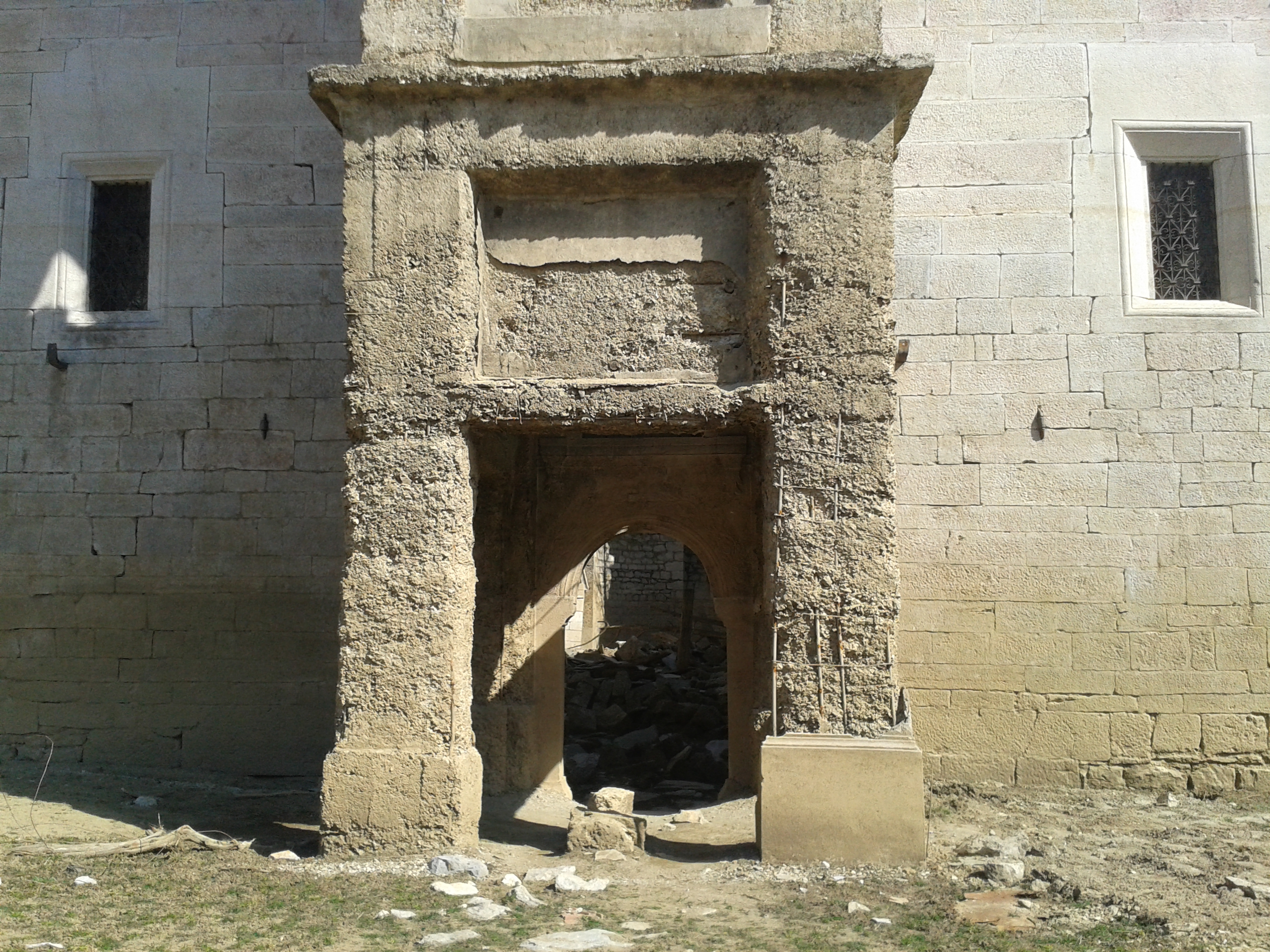
The inside of the church

Outside

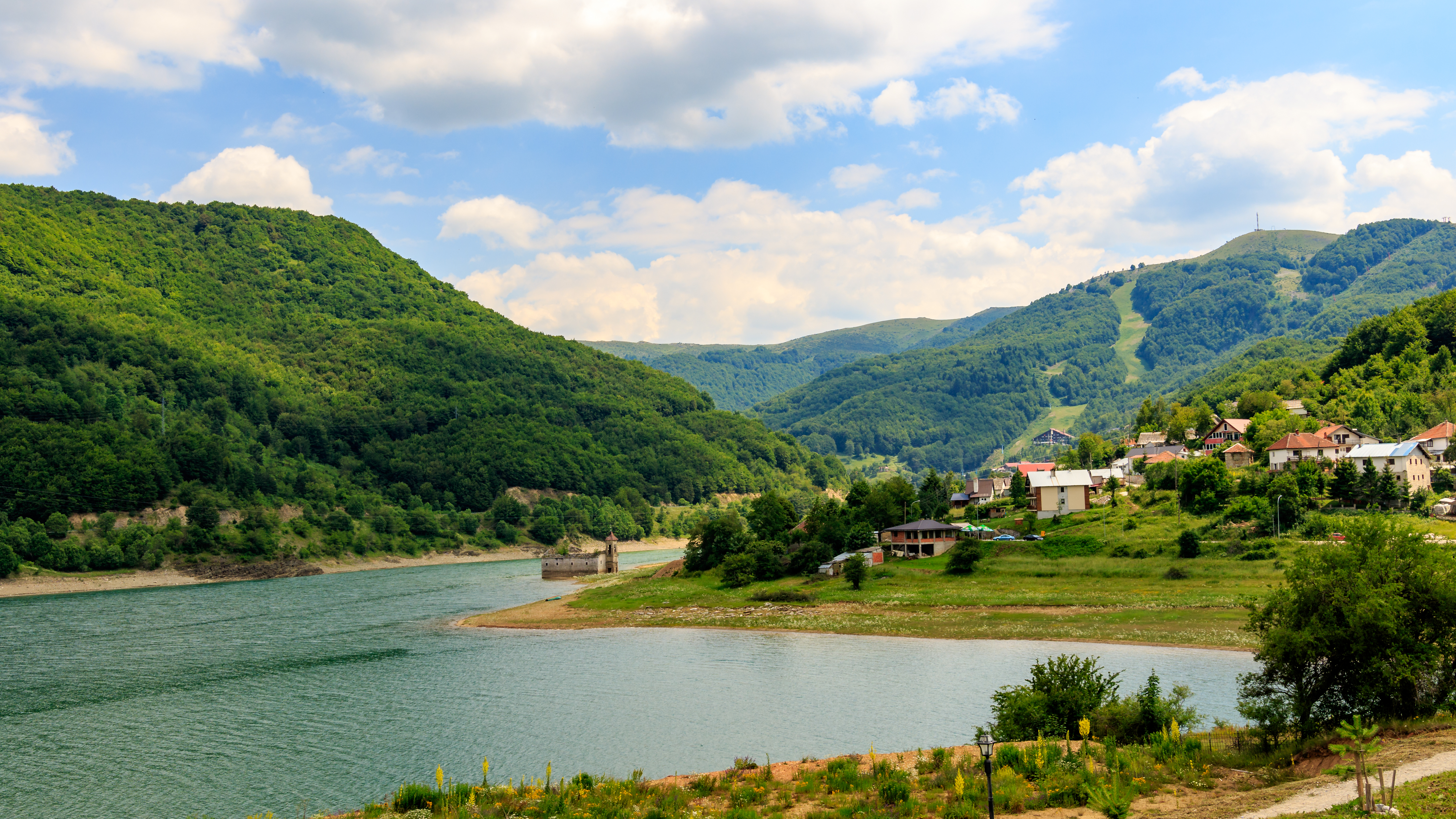
A view of the church together with Mavrovo

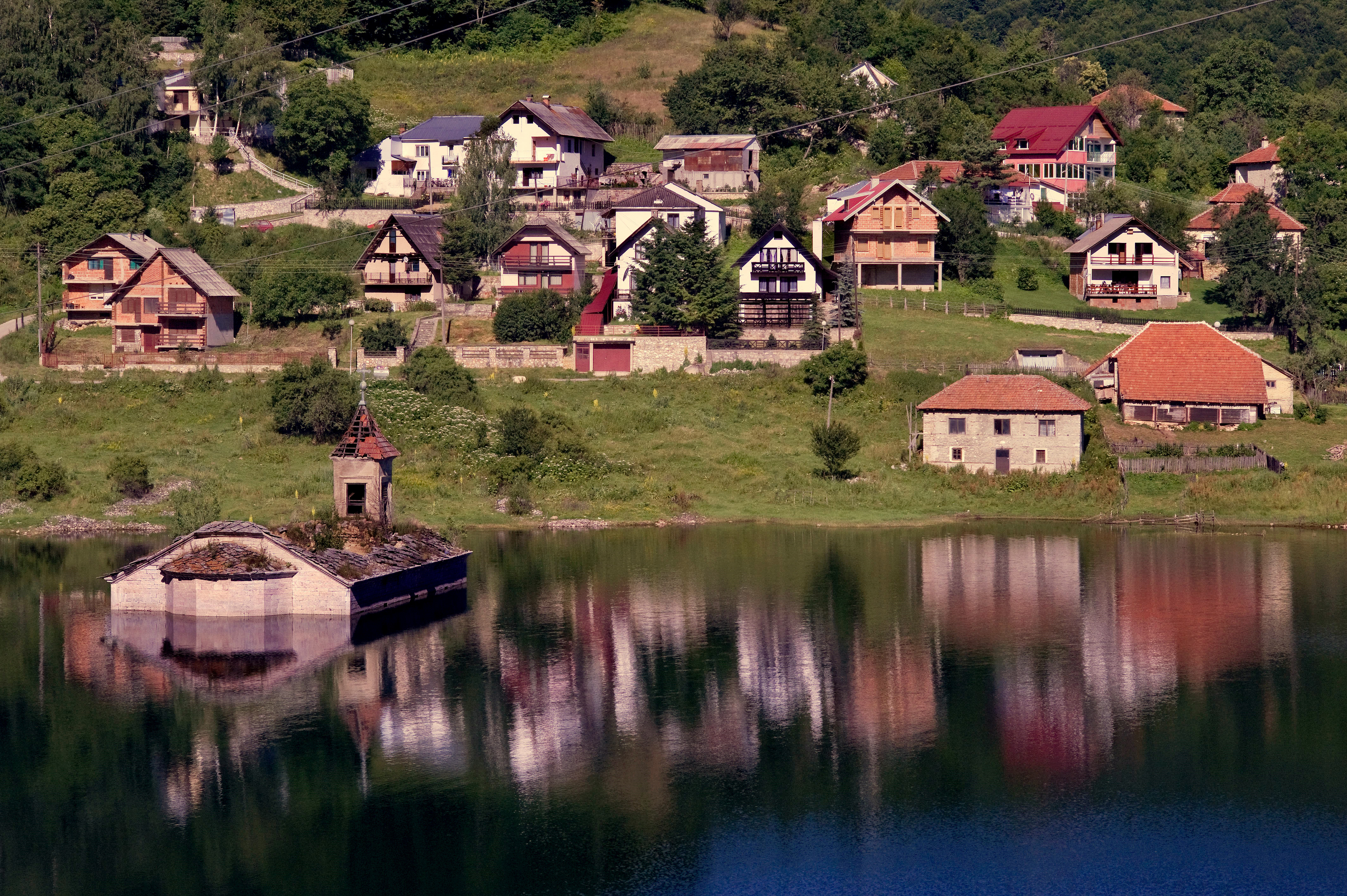
A view of the church with Mavrovo in the background

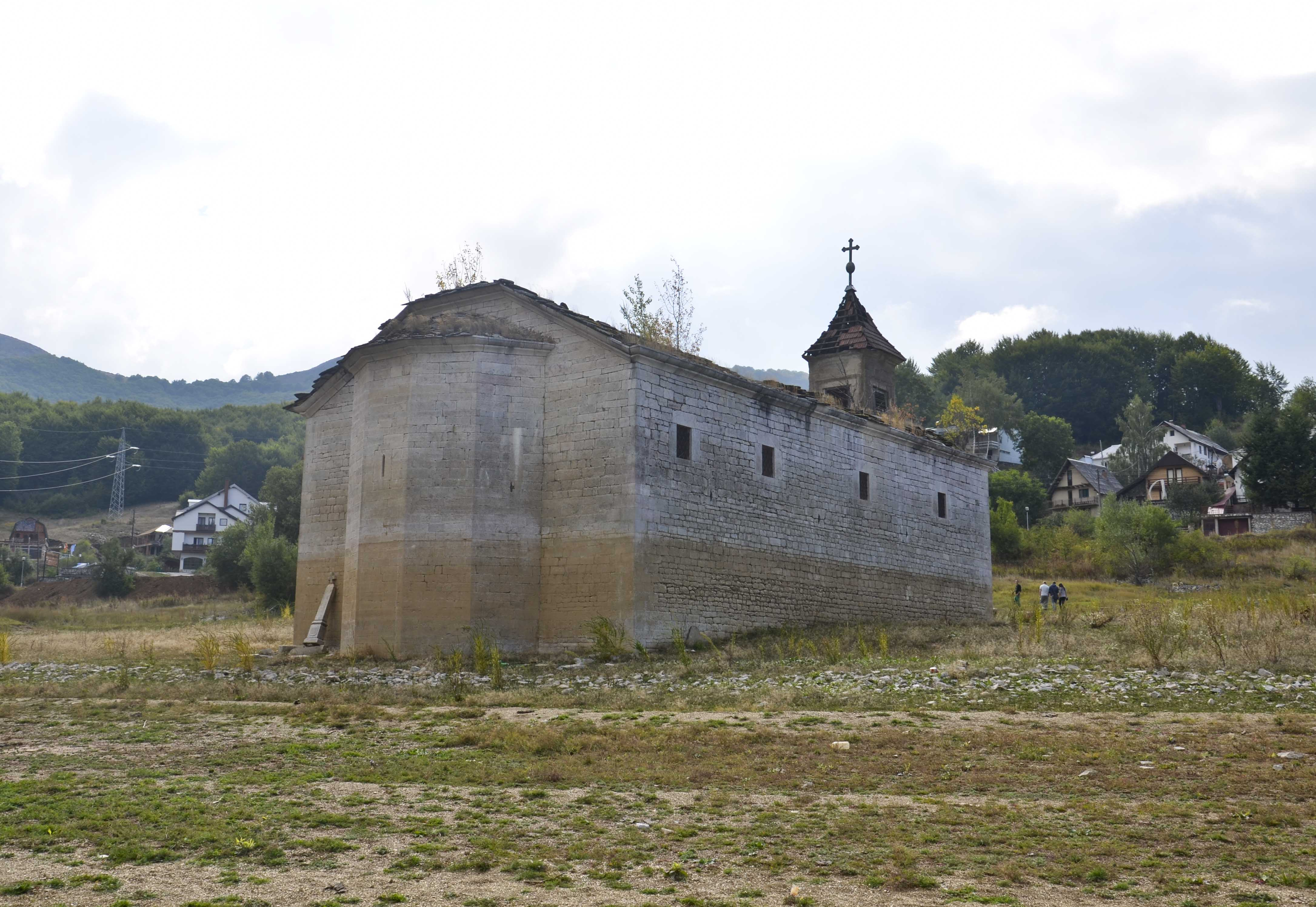
A view of the church when not submerged in water

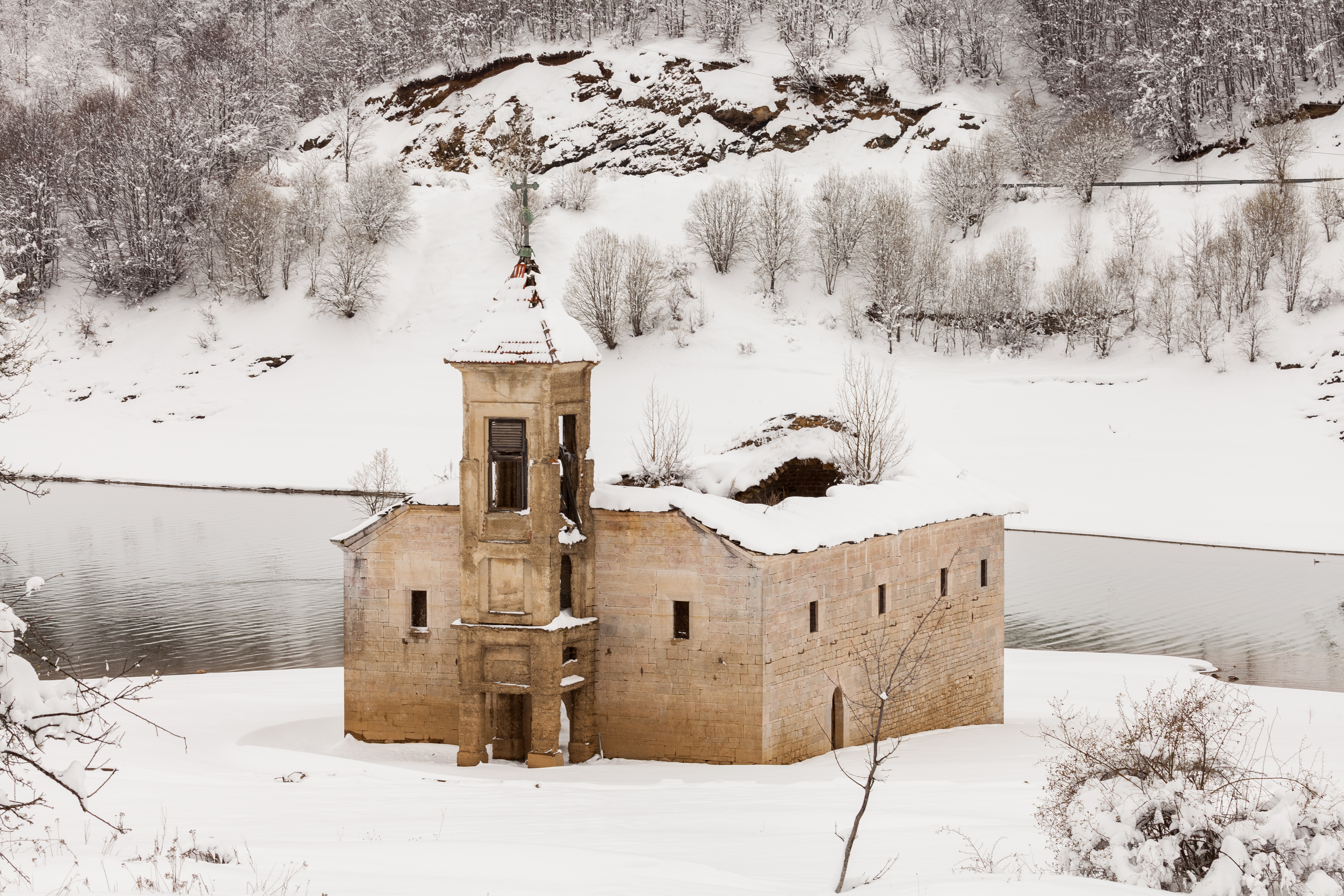
The church in winter

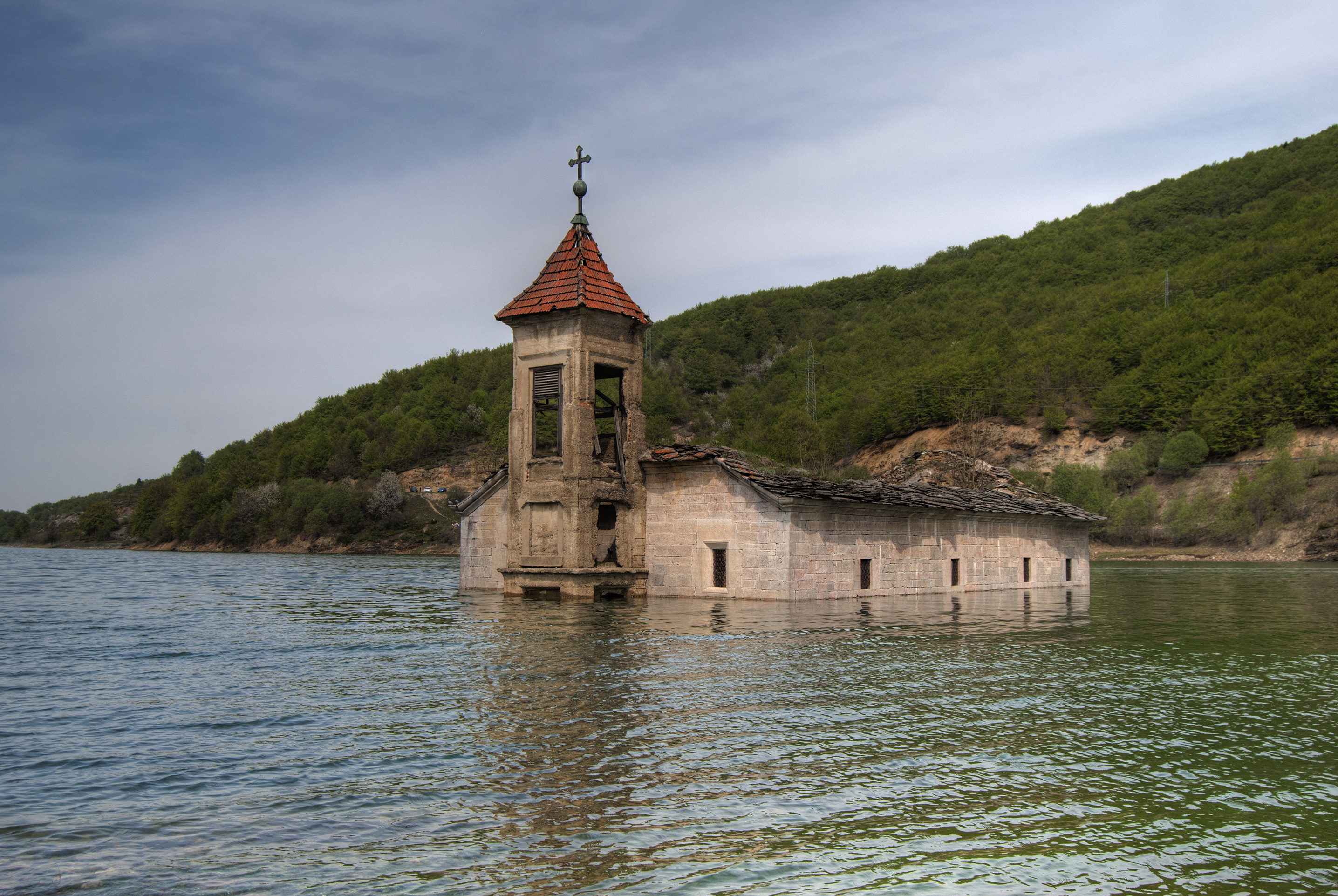
A view of the church under water

== See also ==
- List of churches in North Macedonia
- Mavrovo
