= Basker Fest =

The Basker Fest (Macedonian: Баскерфест, Baskerfest) is an international street festival in Skopje, Republic of North Macedonia, established in 2006. It features acrobats, magicians, mimes, horses, jugglers, clowns, musicians and puppeteers who perform in the streets of Macedonia's capital. It is organized by the civic association "One Way" and is under the auspices of the City of Skopje. The main location is Macedonia Square, the city's main square, but events also take place in the municipalities of Aerodrom, Čair and Gazi Baba and the Soravia Center in the center of Skopje.
