= Pesočani =

- Village
- Песочани
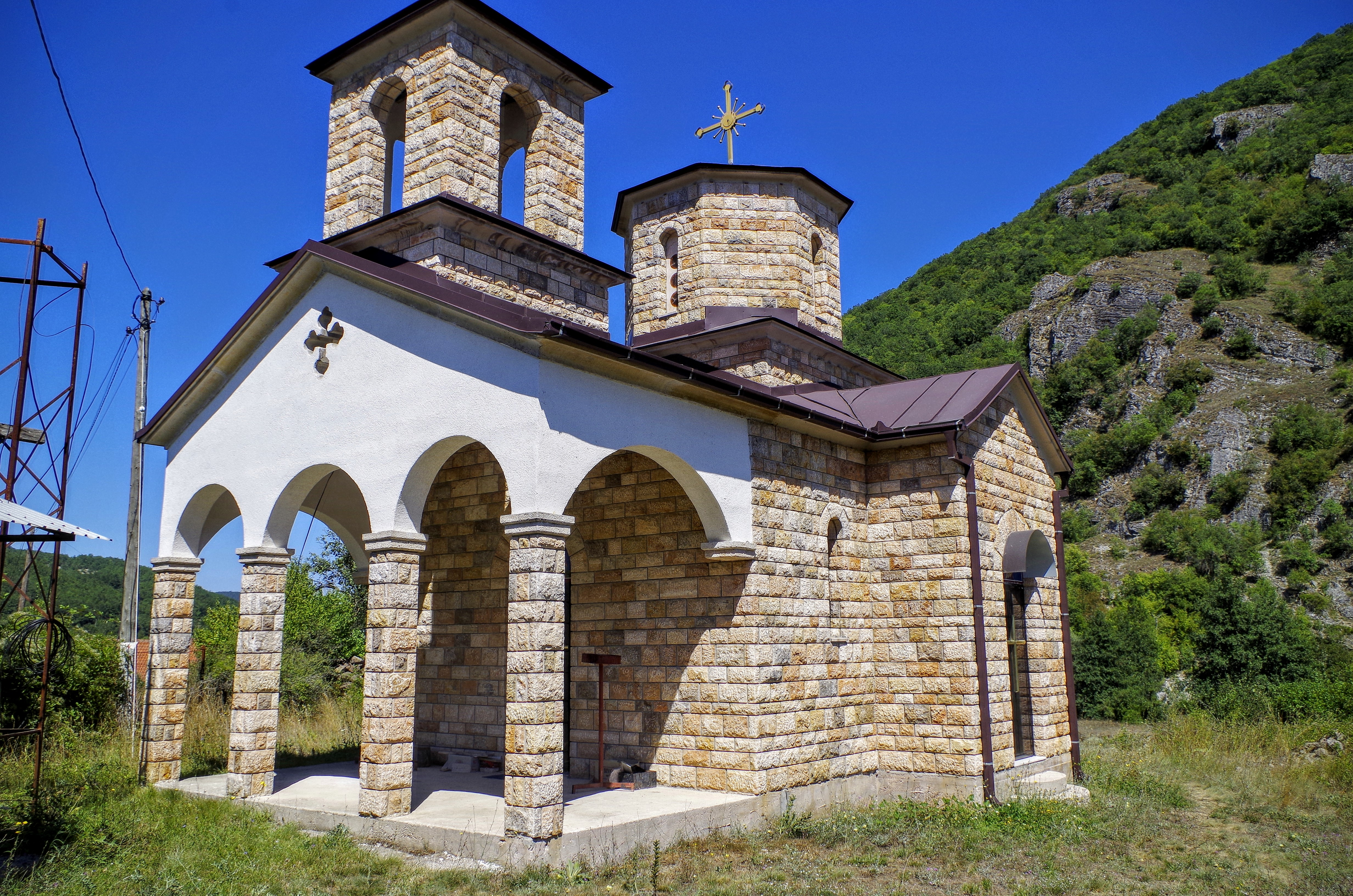
- Sts. Cyril and Methodius Church

- Location within North Macedonia
- Coordinates: 41°19′35″N 20°47′30″E
- Country: North Macedonia
- Region: Southwestern
- Municipality: Debarca

Population (2002)
  - Total: 95
- Time zone: UTC+1 (CET)
  - Summer (DST): UTC+2 (CEST)
- Car plates: OH
- Website: .

Pesočani (Macedonian: Песочани) is a village in the municipality of Debarca, North Macedonia. It used to be part of the former municipality of Belčišta.

== Name ==
The village in Albanian is known as Pesoçan.

== History ==
Pesočani during the Ottoman period, was a village inhabited by Muslim Albanians until the onset of the Balkan Wars (1912-1913). In 1918, Pesočani was razed, and Albanians fled to nearby villages such as Radolišta where the families of their descendants are known by the village name of Pesoçan and were brutally killed. Between 1912 and 1918, the village was destroyed, and thereafter two new settlements were founded in its place: Novo Selo and Novo Aleksandrovo (both of which today became modern Pesočani). Pesočani was resettled with a Macedonian population.

== Demographics ==
According to the 2002 census, the village had a total of 95 inhabitants. Ethnic groups in the village include:

- Macedonians 95
