= Mavrovo, Mavrovo i Rostuše =

Village in North Macedonia

Coordinates: 41°39′N 20°44′E

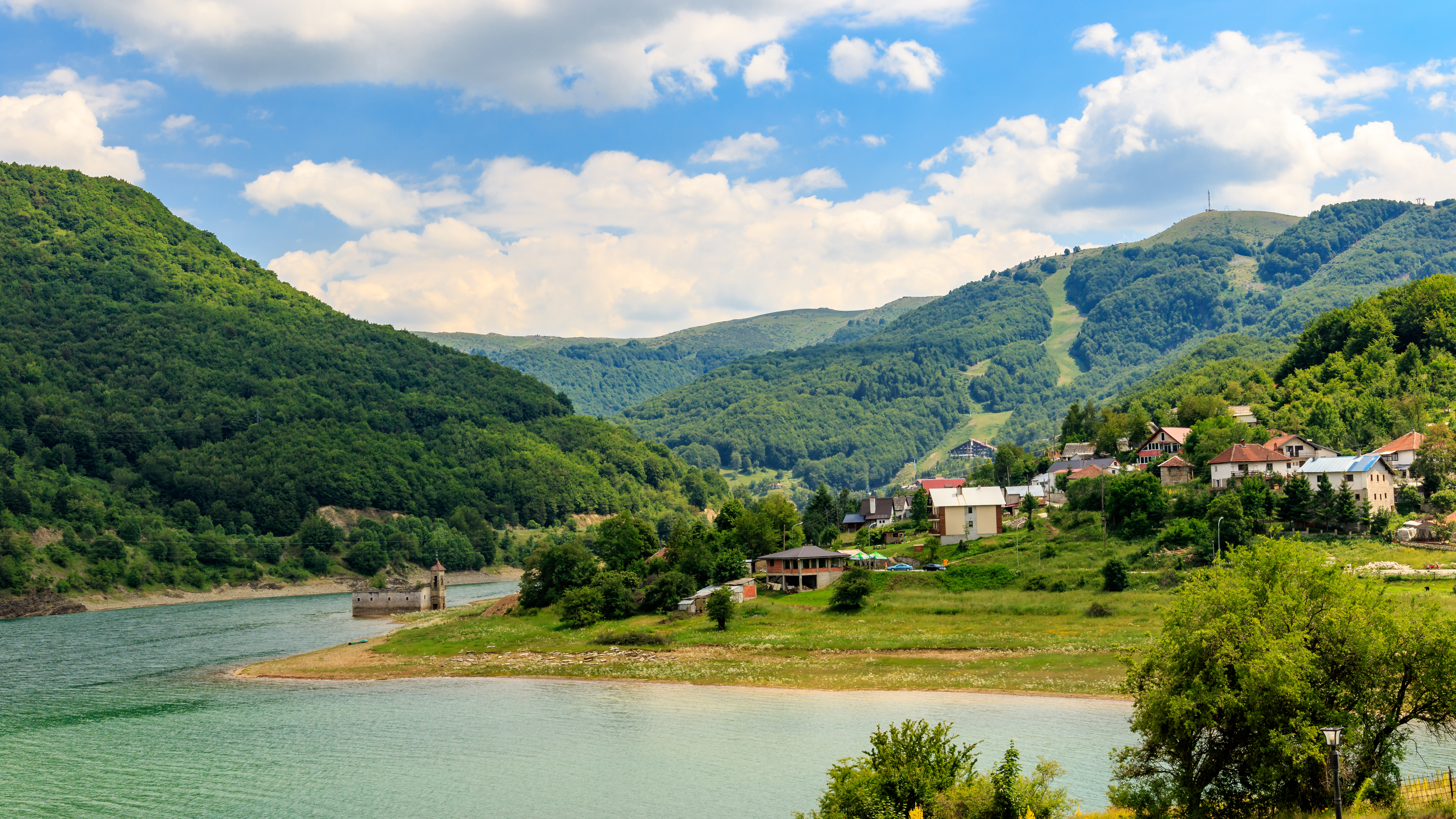
View of the village of Mavrovo.

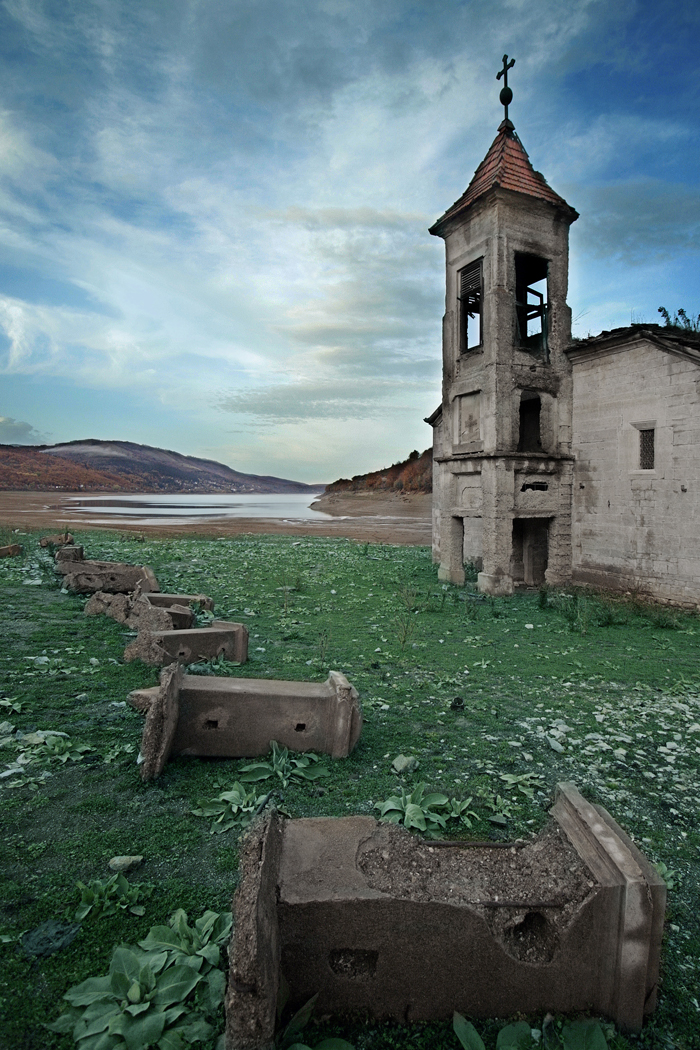
St Nicholas Church (1850).

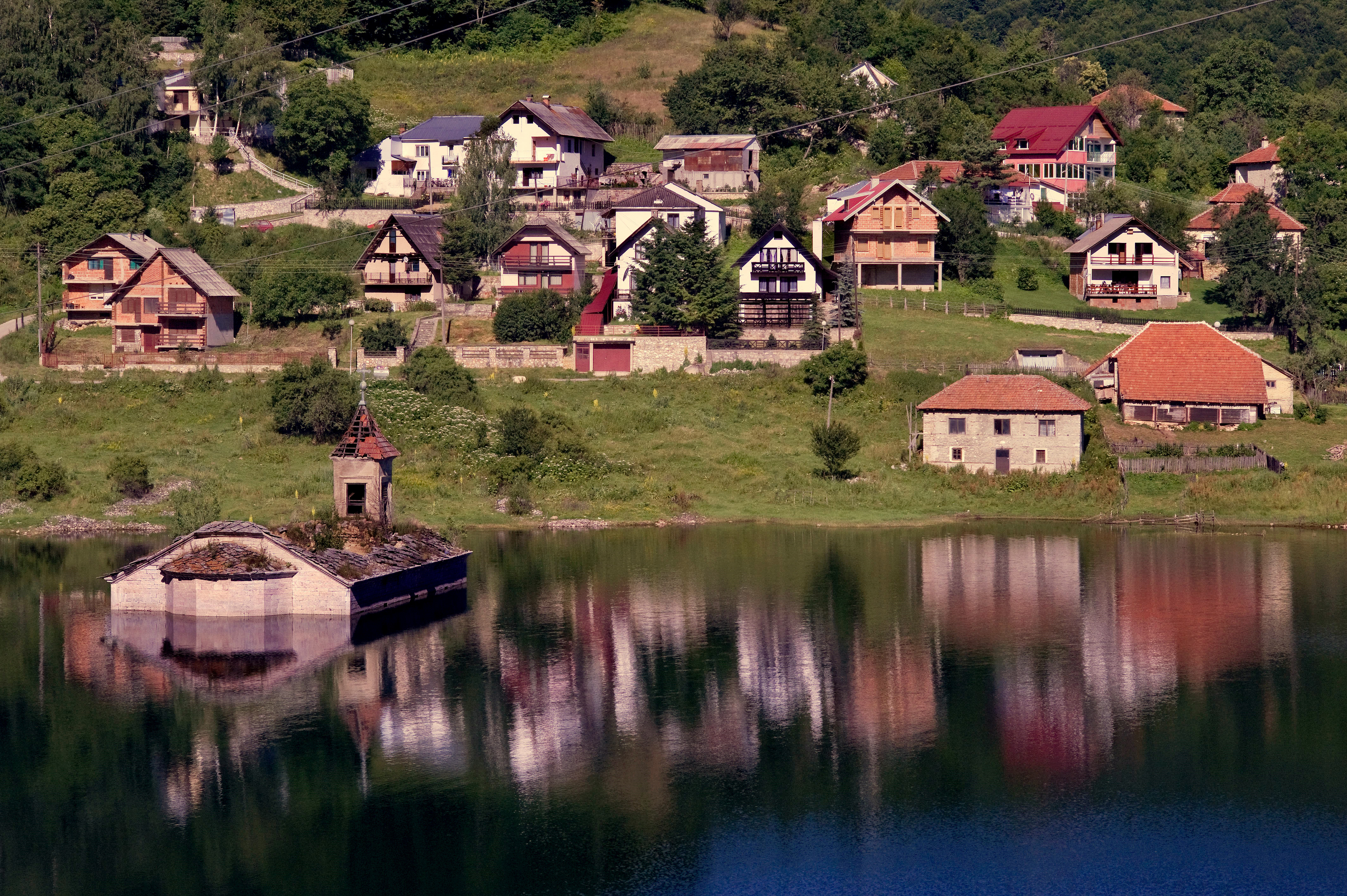
St Nicholas Church (1850) in the summer.

Mavrovo (Macedonian: Маврово [ˈmavrɔvɔ]) is a village and tourist resort in the mountainous region of western North Macedonia. It is located in the Mavrovo and Rostuša Municipality. The St Nicholas Church in Mavrovo was built in 1850. It was submerged in the local lake in 1953, but due to droughts in the 21st century it has largely appeared out of the lake.

== Demographics ==
Mavrovo is attested in the 1467/68 Ottoman tax registry (defter) for the Nahiyah of Kalkandelen. The village had a total of 20 Christian households and 2 bachelors.

In statistics gathered by Vasil Kanchov in 1900, the village was inhabited by 1222 Bulgarians, 12 Muslim Albanians and 25 Vlachs. Kanchov notes the village as being bilingual in Albanian and Bulgarian, with the latter being the language spoken in the househould. According to a 1929 ethnographic map by Russian Slavist Afanasy Selishchev, Mavrovo was a Bulgarian village.

According to the 2002 census, the village had a total of 166 inhabitants. Ethnic groups in the village include:

- Macedonians 163
- Serbs 3

As of the 2021 census, Mavrovo had 212 residents with the following ethnic composition:

- Macedonians 200
- Others 10
- Persons for whom data are taken from administrative sources 2
