= Mal Radobil =

Mal Radobil Мал Радобил
- Village
- Location within North Macedonia
- Country: North Macedonia
- Region: Pelagonia
- Municipality: Prilep
- Elevation: 790 m (2,590 ft)

Population (2002)
  - Total: 10
- Time zone: UTC+1 (CET)
- Area code: +389/48/4XXXXX

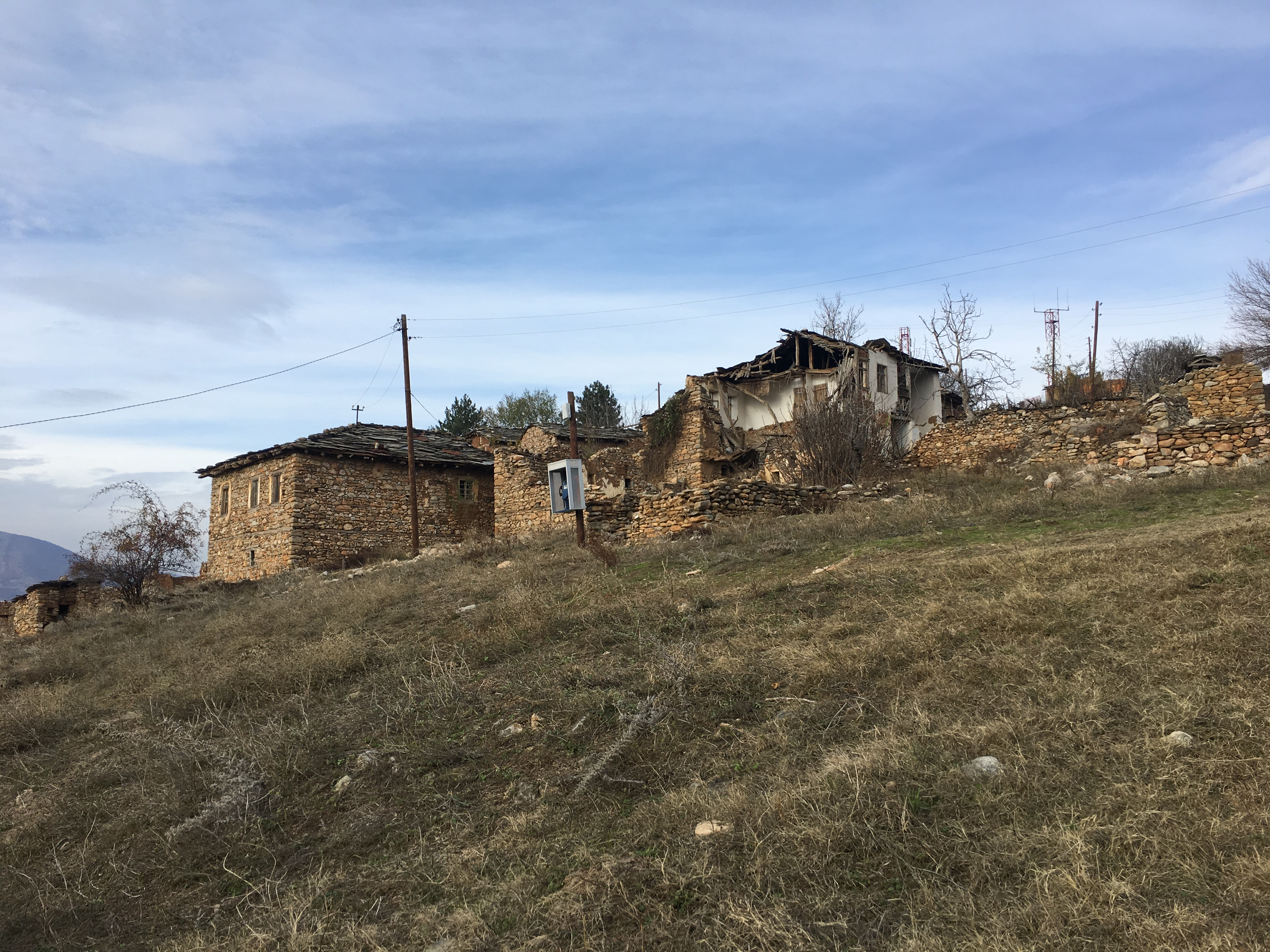
Houses in the village of Mal Radobil

Mal Radobil is a village in Municipality of Prilep, North Macedonia.

== Demographics ==
According to the 2002 census, the village had a total of 10 inhabitants. Ethnic groups in the village include:

- Macedonians 10
