= Debreše =

Debreše Дебреше Debresh
- Village
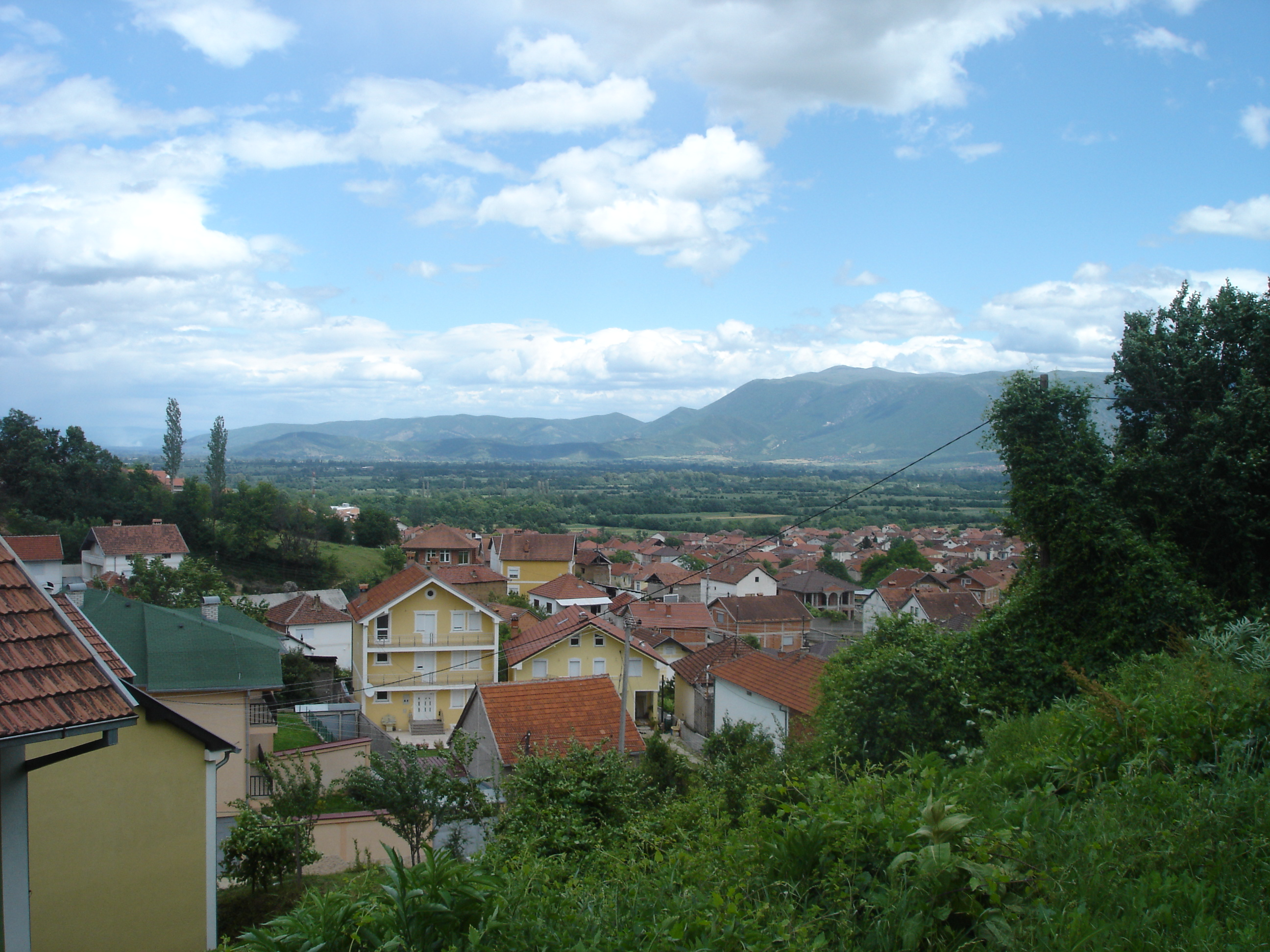

- Location within North Macedonia
- Coordinates: 41°49′N 20°53′E
- Country: North Macedonia
- Region: Polog
- Municipality: Gostivar

Population (2021)
  - Total: 2,859
- Time zone: UTC+1 (CET)
  - Summer (DST): UTC+2 (CEST)
- Car plates: GV

Debreše (Macedonian: Дебреше, Albanian: Debresh) is a village in the municipality of Gostivar, North Macedonia.

== History ==
According to the 1467–68 Ottoman defter, Debreše appears as being largely inhabited by a Muslim Albanian population. Some families had a mixed Slav-Albanian anthroponomy - usually a Slavic first name and an Albanian last name or last names with Albanian patronyms and Slavic suffixes.

The names are: Mitran, son of Kodra; Rajk-o, his son; Milosh, his son; Dabzhiv, son of Hamza; Gjorgj, son of Goga; Stepan, his brother; Dabzhiv, his son; Dosa, son of Ilije; Lala, his brother; Dona, son of Bud-i; Dimitri, son of Dibrashin; Nen-o, son of Gego; Dimitri, son of Gego; Jovan, son of Gego; Nik-o, son of Miltush; Jovan, his brother; Bojk-o, son of Gjon; Lazor, son of Dobri; Lazor, son of Nikolla; Rajk-o, son of Nikolla; Argjir, son of Rele; Tanush, son of Oliver; Nik-o, son of Lal-ush.

== Demographics ==
As of the 2021 census, Debreše had 2,859 residents with the following ethnic composition:

- Albanians 2,683
- Persons for whom data are taken from administrative sources 103
- Macedonians 59
- Others 14

According to the 2002 census, the village had a total of 4847 inhabitants. Ethnic groups in the village include:

- Albanians 4739
- Macedonians 93
- Turks 2
- Bosniaks 1
- Romani 156
- Others 12

== Sports ==
The local football club KF Flamurtari Debresh plays in the Macedonian Third Football League.
