= Radolišta =

Radolišta Радолишта Ladorishti
- Village
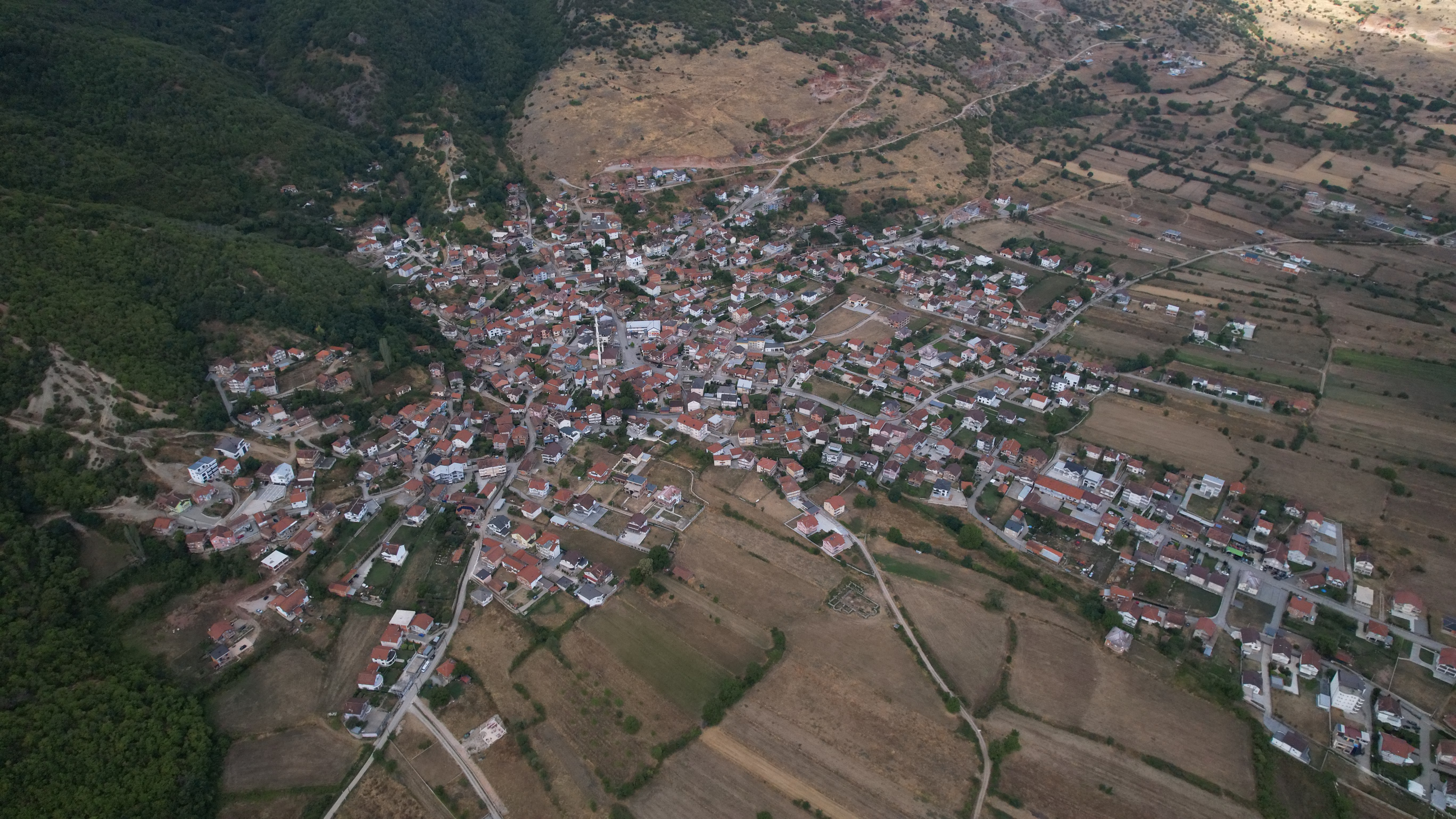
- Air view of the village

- Location within North Macedonia
- Coordinates: 41°9′51″N 20°37′23″E
- Country: North Macedonia
- Region: Southwestern
- Municipality: Struga
- Elevation: 745 m (2,444 ft)

Population (2021)
  - Total: 2,067
- Time zone: UTC+1 (CET)
  - Summer (DST): UTC+2 (CEST)
- Postal code: 6333
- Area code: +389
- Car plates: SU
- Website: Ladorishti.com

Radolišta (Macedonian: Радолишта, Albanian: Ladorisht) is a village in the municipality of Struga, North Macedonia.

== Geography ==
This village is located in the southwest of Struga Municipality, at the foot of the Jabllanicë mountain range. The village is in hilly-mountain altitude of 700–820 m (2,297–2,690 ft) above sea level.

== History ==
Human settlement in Radolišta has a long history that dates back to late antiquity:

- Traces of old structural foundations located in the eastern part of the village
- Paleochristian Basilica (locally called "Bazilika"), built in the 6th century
- Necropolis (7th-8th centuries)

=== Basilica and Necropolis ===
The Paleochristian Basilica belonged to the Illyrian Dassareti tribe, which had inhabited this region since antiquity. The Bazilika lies on the southern side of Ladorisht, in an area called 'Livadhet e Dautit' (Daut's Meadows). Excavations began under Dimçe Koço in 1954 and were finished in 1976 by the archaeologist Vlado Malenko. As a result of these excavations, graves from the early Middle Ages were also discovered. The Bazilika consists of a narthex, exonarthex, annex and an intersection. Of particular note are the Narthex and the central ship, which are covered by floors and mosaics stylized with flora and geometric decorations, as well as landscapes of living birds. The Bazilika dates between the end of the 4th century and the beginning of the 5th century, whereas the graves date between the 7th-8th centuries. The findings within this necropolis have similarities and connectivity with the Komani-Kruja culture, which is hypothesized to be the link between the ancestral population of the Albanians and the medieval Albanians.

=== Balkan wars ===
In 1918, Pesočani was razed, and Albanians fled to nearby villages such as Radolišta where the families of their descendants are known by the village name of Pesoçan, were brutally killed.

== Demographics ==
The village of Radolišta is inhabited by Tosks, a subgroup of southern Albanians who speak the Tosk Albanian dialect. Radolišta is one of the largest villages in the region of Struga with more than 800 houses.

As of the 2021 census, Radolišta had 2,067 residents with the following ethnic composition:

- Albanians 1,954
- Persons for whom data are taken from administrative sources 112
- Macedonians 1

According to the 2002 census, the village had a total of 3,119 inhabitants.

== Culture ==
In the village, cultural life is organized, and sports activities through the football club 'Flamurtari(progress) and SHKA Valët e Liqenit (Lake Waves) are represented in many festivals as well as being honoured with many awards and praise. Radolišta is also rooted in cultural heritage as Ura e Gurit OPALE (Stone Bridge OPALE).

== Sports ==
The local football club, KF Flamurtari Ladorisht plays in the Macedonian Third Football League.

== Gallery ==
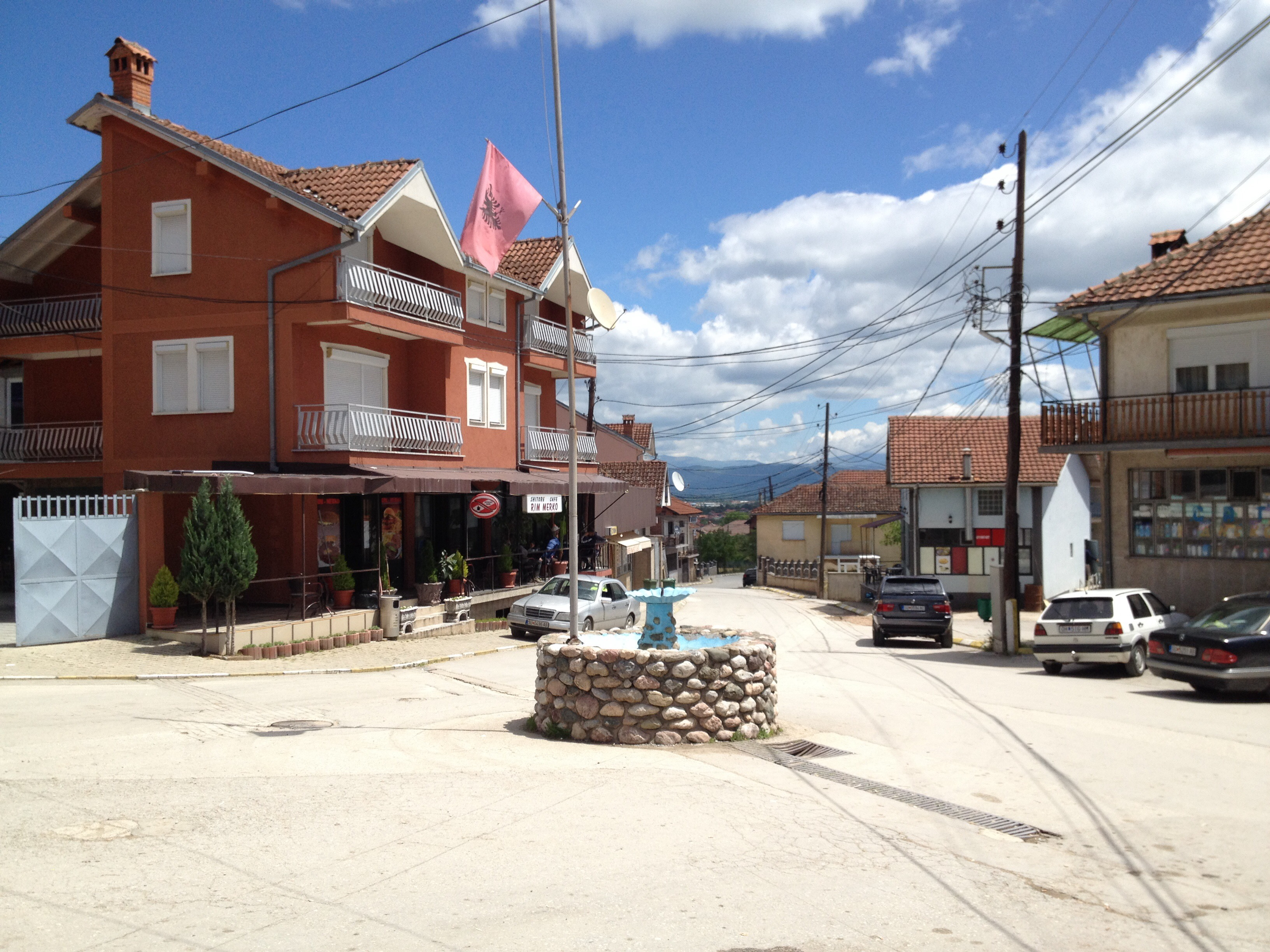
Village centre and square

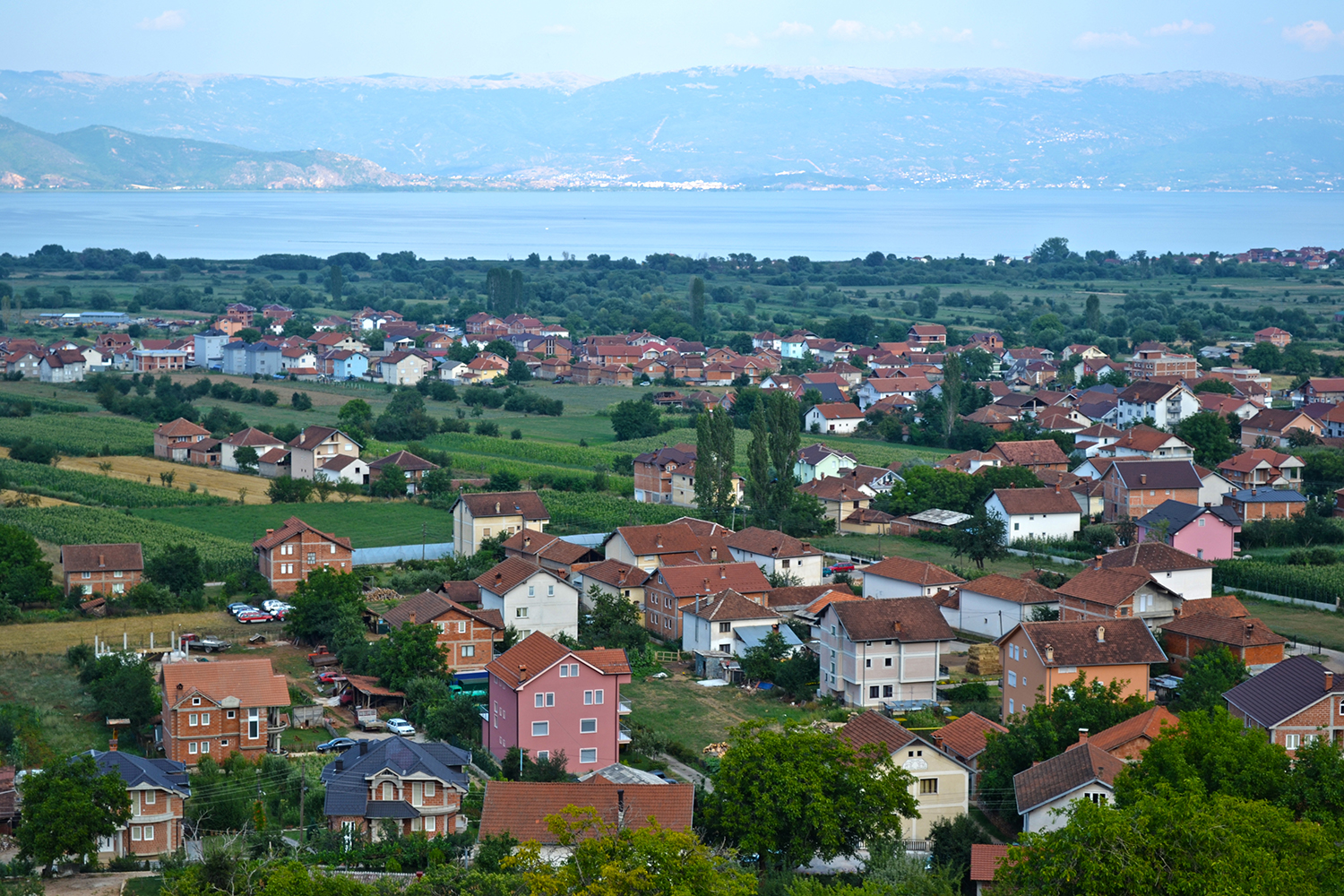
Houses of Radolišta

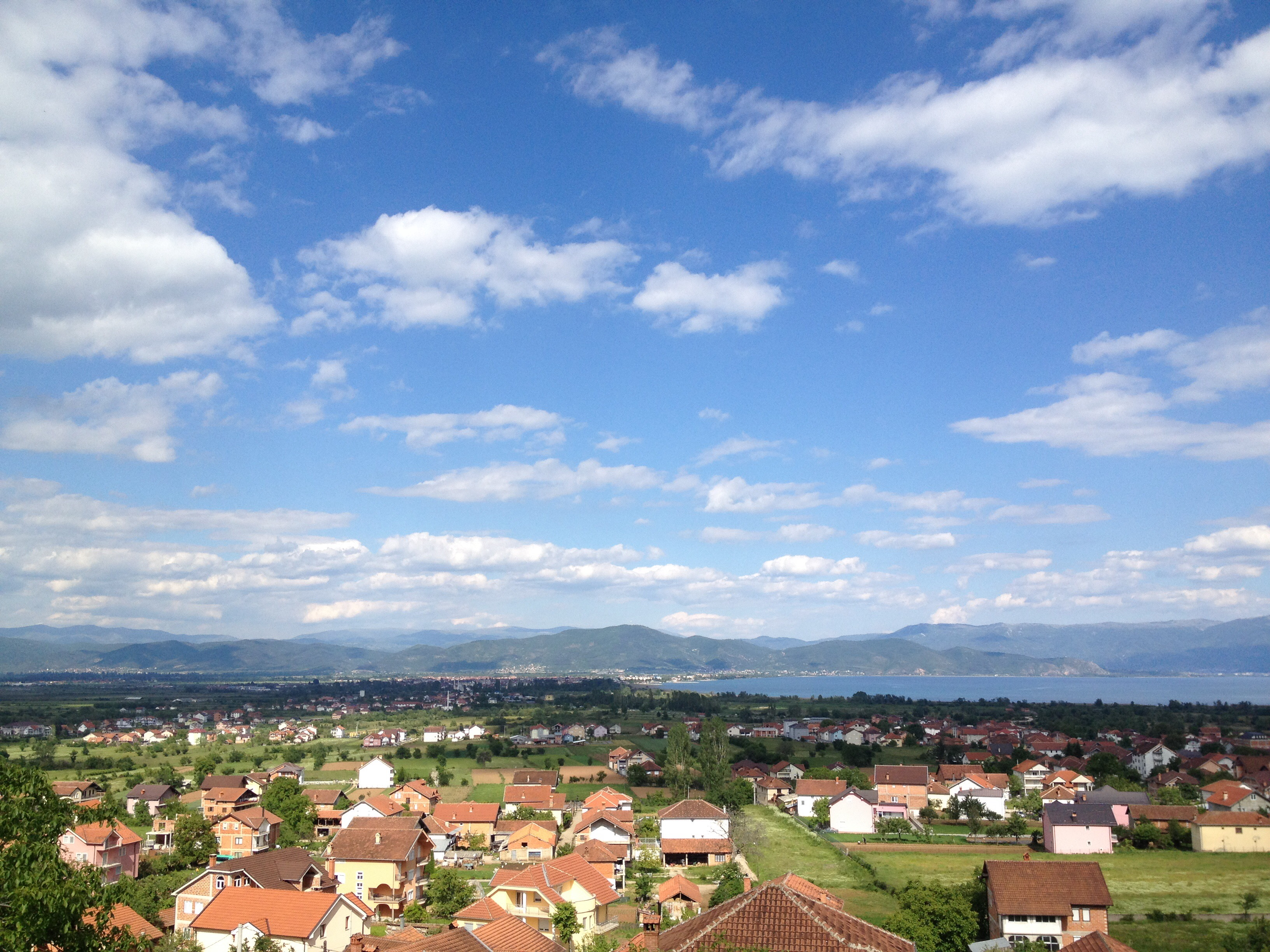
View from Radolišta looking out toward Struga (far background)

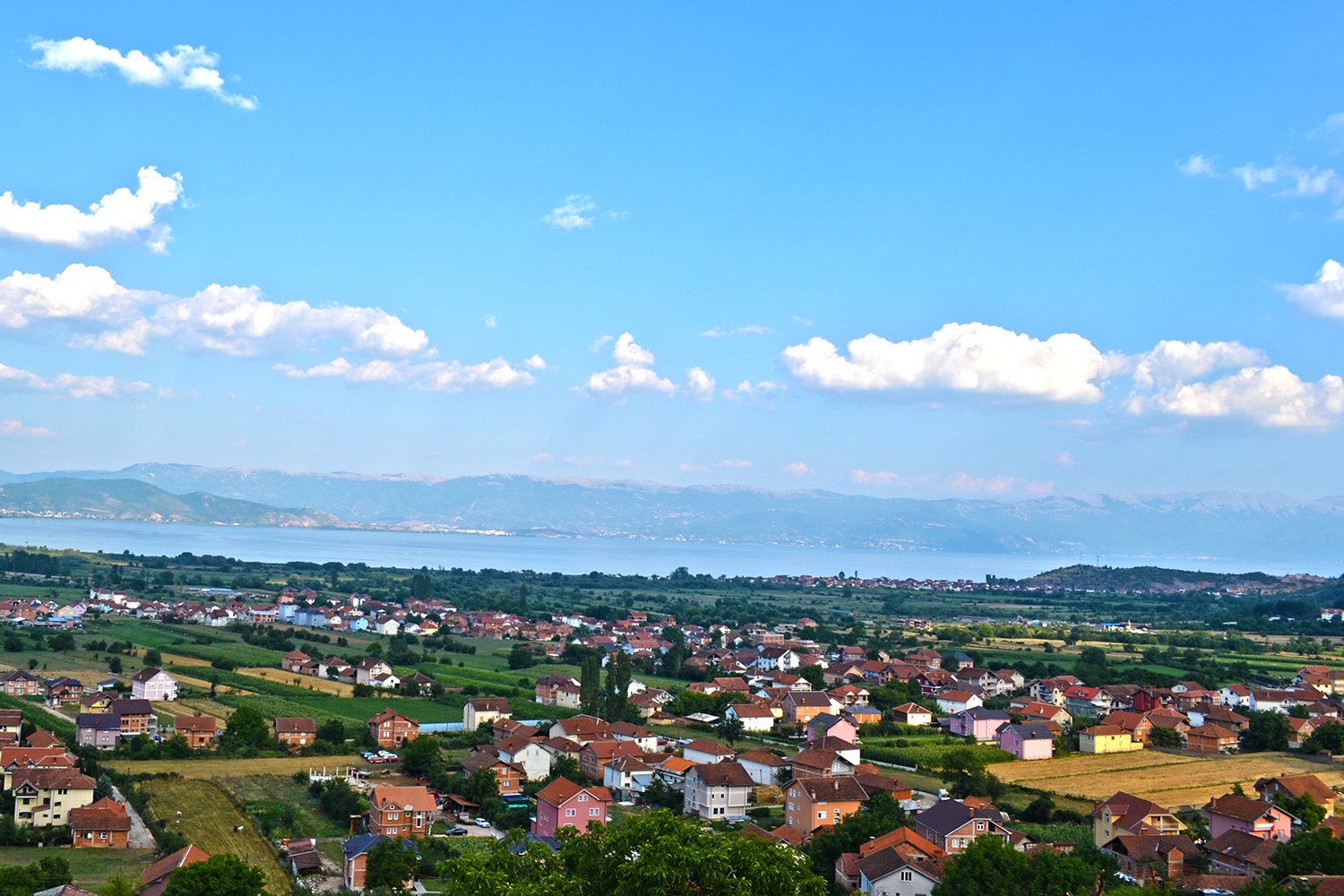
Radolišta and Lake Ohrid (background)

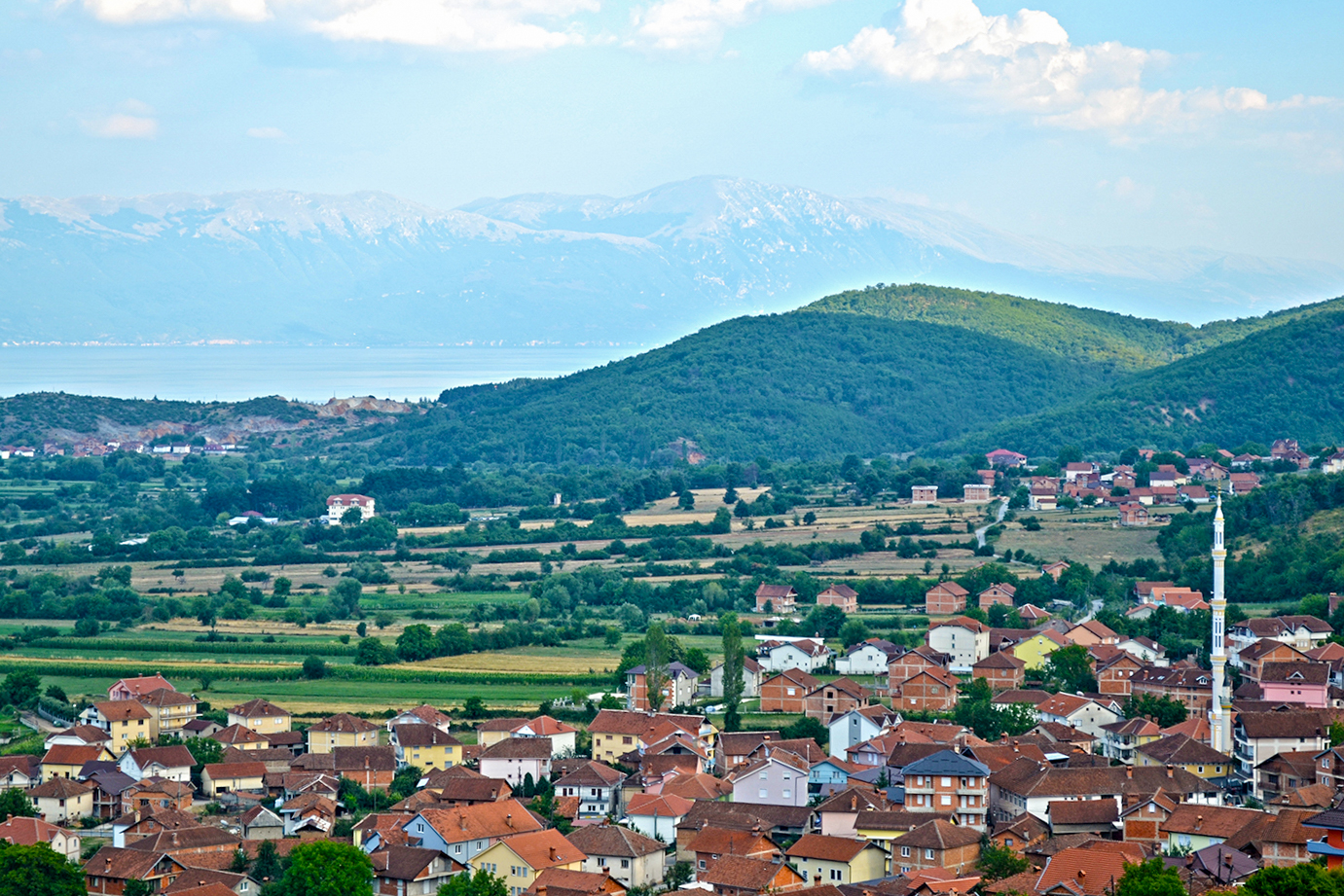
Radolišta, it's mosque and nearby fields

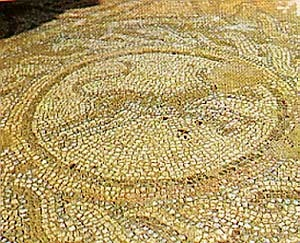
Floor mosaic of Christian basilica (6th century)
