= Skopje Summer Festival =

Annual cultural event

The Skopje Summer Festival is an annual cultural event in Skopje, North Macedonia. It was established in 1979 and marked its 30th anniversary in 2009. It hosts artists, musicians, entertainers and performers who present their achievements in the spheres of music, fine art, film, theatre and multimedia performance. The festival takes place at numerous locations and open places in the city.
