= Soravia Center =

Building in Skopje, North Macedonia

Coordinates: 41.9948°N 21.4343°E

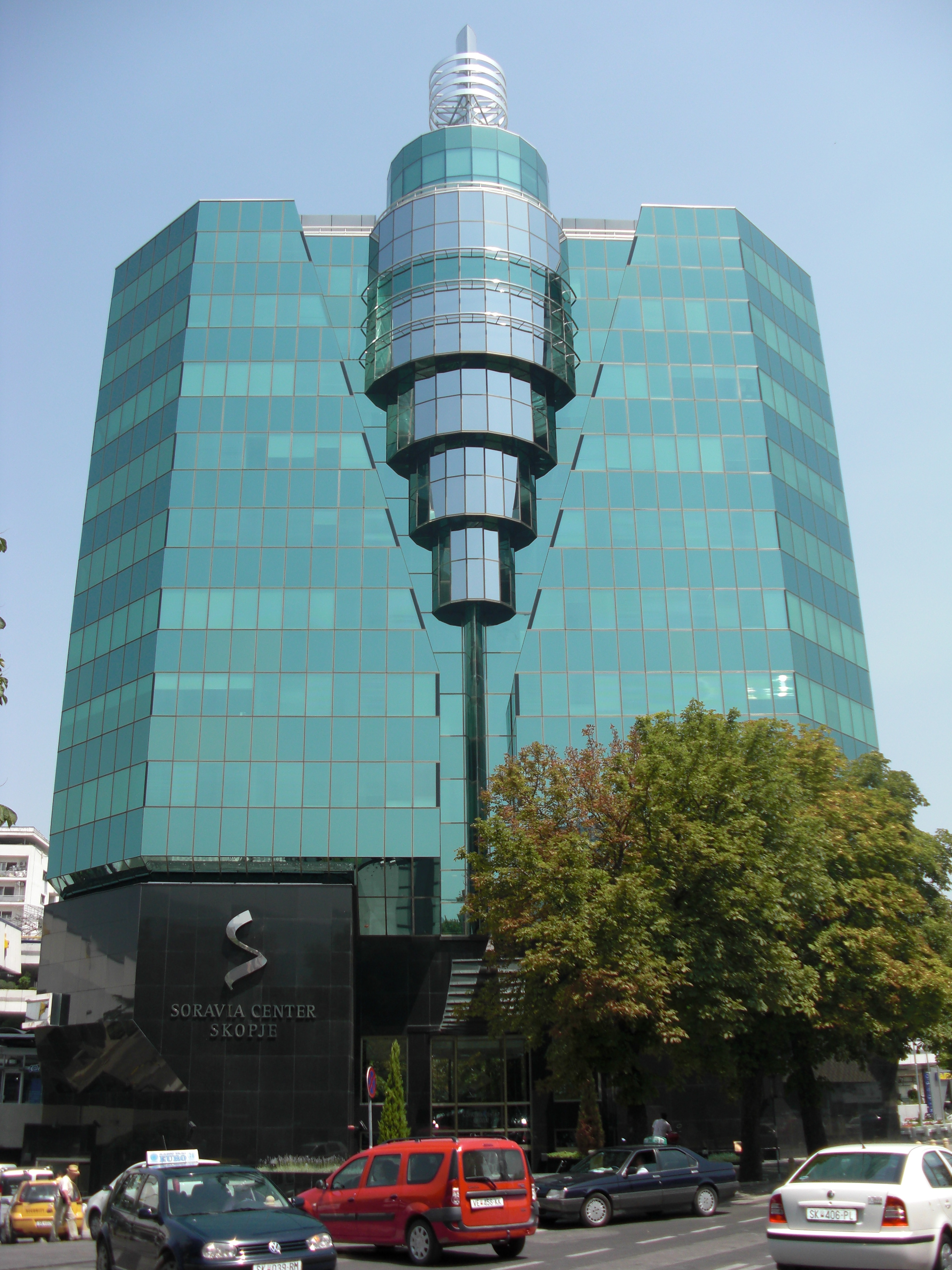
Soravia Center

The Soravia Center, also known as World Trade Center Skopje (Macedonian: Соравиа Центар / Светски Трговски Центар, Albanian: Qendra Soravia / Qendra Botërore e Tregtisë) is a building in Skopje, North Macedonia. Previously twelve floors and 30 m (98 ft) high, the new building has fifteen floors and a height of 37 m (121 ft).

Soravia Center hosts the Embassy of Japan on the sixth floor.
