= 2004–05 Macedonian First Football League =

Macedonian First League
- Season: 2004–05
- Dates: 8 August 2004 – 29 May 2005
- Champions: Rabotnichki; 1st domestic title
- Relegated: Madjari Solidarnost; Sloga Jugomagnat; Napredok
- Champions League: Rabotnichki
- UEFA Cup: Vardar; Bashkimi
- Intertoto Cup: Pobeda; Sileks
- Matches played: 198
- Goals scored: 612 (3.09 per match)
- Top goalscorer: Aleksandar Stojanovski; Stevica Ristić (26 goals)
- Biggest home win: Sileks 8–0 Napredok (17 April 2005)
- Biggest away win: Sloga J. 1–7 Shkëndija (12 March 2005)
- Highest scoring: Sileks 8–0 Napredok (17 April 2005); Sloga J. 1–7 Shkëndija (12 March 2005); Belasica 5–3 Sloga J. (8 May 2005); Cementarnica 5–3 Pobeda (29 May 2005)

The 2004–05 Macedonian First League was the 13th season of the Macedonian First Football League, the highest football league of Macedonia. The first matches of the season were played on 8 August 2004 and the last on 29 May 2005. Pobeda were the defending champions, having won their second title. The 2004-05 champions were Rabotnichki who had won their first title.

== Promotion and relegation ==
At the start of the 2004–05 season

Promoted from 2003–04 Second League

- Bregalnica Shtip (winners)
- Shkëndija (runners-up)

Relegated to 2004–05 Second League

- Tikvesh (11th)
- Bregalnica Delchevo (12th)

At the end of the 2004–05 season

Promoted from 2004–05 Second League

- Vëllazërimi (winners)
- Renova (runners-up)
- Makedonija G.P. (Third placed; won play-off match)

Relegated to 2005–06 Second League

- Madjari Solidarnost (10th; lost play-off match)
- Sloga Jugomagnat (11th)
- Napredok (12th)

== Participating teams ==
Location of teams in 2004–05 Macedonian First League

Club	City	Stadium	Capacity
Bashkimi	Kumanovo	Gradski stadion Kumanovo	7,000
Belasica	Strumica	Stadion Mladost	6,370
Bregalnica Kraun	Shtip	Gradski stadion Shtip	4,000
Cementarnica 55	Skopje	Stadion Cementarnica	2,000
Madjari Solidarnost	Skopje	Stadion Boris Trajkovski	3,000
Napredok	Kichevo	Gradski stadion Kichevo	5,000
Pobeda	Prilep	Stadion Goce Delchev	15,000
Rabotnichki Kometal	Skopje	Gradski stadion Skopje	18,104
Shkëndija 79	Tetovo	Gradski stadion Tetovo	15,000
Sileks	Kratovo	Stadion Sileks	5,000
Sloga Jugomagnat	Skopje	Chair Stadium	6,000
Vardar	Skopje	Gradski stadion Skopje	18,104

== League table ==
Pos	Team	Pld	W	D	L	GF	GA	GD	Pts	Qualification or relegation
1	Rabotnichki Kometal (C)	33	25	3	5	66	23	+43	78	Qualification for the Champions League first qualifying round
2	Vardar	33	22	6	5	68	34	+34	72	Qualification for the UEFA Cup first qualifying round
3	Pobeda	33	16	7	10	59	49	+10	55	Qualification for the Intertoto Cup first round
4	Sileks	33	15	6	12	56	37	+19	51	Qualification for the Intertoto Cup first round
5	Shkëndija	33	15	5	13	59	40	+19	50	
6	Bashkimi	33	14	7	12	53	47	+6	49	Qualification for the UEFA Cup first qualifying round (Note: Bashkimi qualified for the UEFA Cup first qualifying round by winning the 2004–05 Macedonian Football Cup.)
7	Belasica	33	14	6	13	53	47	+6	48 (Note: Head-to-head record: Bregalnica Kraun 6 pts, Belasica 3 pts.)	
8	Bregalnica Kraun	33	14	6	13	55	60	−5	48	
9	Cementarnica 55 (Note: Cementarnica 55 were deducted three points for walking off at the match against Sileks in the 32nd round.) (O)	33	13	7	13	54	50	+4	43	Qualification for the relegation play-offs
10	Madjari Solidarnost (R)	33	12	5	16	35	46	−11	41	Qualification for the relegation play-offs
11	Sloga Jugomagnat (R)	33	5	2	26	37	80	−43	17	Relegation to the Macedonian Second League
12	Napredok (R)	33	1	4	28	17	99	−82	7	Relegation to the Macedonian Second League

Source: MacedonianFootball.com, RSSSF.org
Rules for classification: 1) Points; 2) Goal difference; 3) Goals scored; 4) Head-to-head points; 5) Head-to-head goal difference; 6) Head-to-head away goals scored (only if two teams); 7) Head-to-head goals scored; 8) Draw; 9) Play-off. (Note: Criteria 2, 3 and 8 is only used if not deciding Champion, teams for UEFA competitions or relegation).
(C) Champions; (O) Play-off winners; (R) Relegated

== Results ==
Every team will play three times against each other team for a total of 33 matches. The first 22 matchdays will consist of a regular double round-robin schedule. The league standings at this point will then be used to determine the games for the last 11 matchdays.

Home \ Away	BAS	BEL	BRE	CEM	MAS	NAP	POB	RAB	SKE	SIL	SLO	VAR	BAS	BEL	BRE	CEM	MAS	NAP	POB	RAB	SKE	SIL	SLO	VAR
Bashkimi	—	2–1	4–0	1–0	1–2	3–1	0–2	1–2	2–1	2–2	0–2	0–1	—	—	2–2	4–3	1–1	6–1	—	—	—	2–1	—	4–2
Belasica	1–3	—	2–0	0–0	0–1	3–2	3–0	3–1	1–1	1–1	3–1	3–1	0–0	—	—	2–1	—	—	—	—	—	3–2	5–3	2–1
Bregalnica Kraun	2–2	2–1	—	1–0	2–1	4–1	0–0	1–4	2–1	0–0	4–1	2–3	—	1–0	—	—	—	6–1	1–1	4–2	2–1	—	—	—
Cementarnica 55	2–1	2–2	6–1	—	2–1	5–2	0–2	1–3	1–0	2–0	2–1	1–1	—	—	1–1	—	—	5–1	5–3	0–1	2–1	—	—	—
Madjari Solidarnost	0–1	1–0	1–0	0–0	—	1–0	2–1	0–2	0–0	0–2	3–2	1–2	—	0–3	2–0	1–2	—	3–0	—	—	—	—	1–0	—
Napredok	1–2	0–1	0–3	0–0	0–3	—	0–0	0–3	0–3	0–5	0–1	0–4	—	1–5	—	—	—	—	0–1	0–3 (Note: Match awarded because Napredok was not walked on the pitch because the unpaid obligations for their players.)	2–0	—	1–1	—
Pobeda	3–1	3–0	5–2	2–0	3–1	4–1	—	0–4	1–1	1–0	4–1	1–0	2–1	2–1	—	—	3–3	—	—	0–0	—	2–1	1–0	—
Rabotnichki	0–2	1–1	2–1	3–0	4–0	3–1	3–2	—	3–0	3–0	1–0	0–0	1–0	2–0	—	—	3–0	—	—	—	—	3–0	1–0	1–3
Shkëndija	3–0	4–2	3–4	1–0	1–0	2–0	4–1	0–1	—	4–0	3–0	0–0	1–1	2–1	—	—	2–1	—	3–2	2–1	—	—	7–0	—
Sileks	1–0	2–0	1–0	3–1	1–1	4–0	2–2	0–1	2–0	—	5–1	1–2	—	—	0–3	3–0 (Note: Match abandoned after the Cementarnica's players walked out of the pitch at the half-time by the result 1–2 after were attacked by the personnel who was worked in the home club at that time. Later, the match was awarded to Sileks.)	3–1	8–0	—	—	3–1	—	—	0–2
Sloga Jugomagnat	0–1	1–2	4–1	0–2	1–2	3–0	3–2	1–3	1–7	0–1	—	1–2	2–2	—	2–3	2–3	—	—	—	—	—	0–1	—	1–4
Vardar	4–1	2–1	2–1	3–2	3–1	1–1	2–0	0–1	1–0	1–1	3–1	—	—	—	4–1	3–3	1–0	3–0	4–2	—	3–0	—	—	—

Source: RSSSF.org
Legend: Blue = home team win; Yellow = draw; Red = away team win.

== Relegation playoff ==
12 June 2005
17:00 CEST

Madžari Solidarnost	1–2	Makedonija G.P.
Karanfilovski 84'	Report	Ivanovski 73'; Tunevski 90+2'

Gradski stadion, Skopje
Attendance: 400
Referee: Bekim Bauta (Struga)

12 June 2005
17:00 CEST

Cementarnica 55	2–1	Turnovo
Spasovski 45'; Ristovski 89'	Report	Ivanov 20'

Stadion Goce Delchev, Prilep
Attendance: 1,000
Referee: Ljubomir Krstevski (Bitola)

== Top goalscorers ==
Rank	Player	Club	Goals
1	(North Macedonia) Aleksandar Stojanovski	Belasica	26
1	(North Macedonia) Stevica Ristić	Sileks	26
3	(Brazil) Wandeir	Vardar	19
4	(North Macedonia) Blazhe Ilijoski	Rabotnichki	17
4	(North Macedonia) Riste Naumov	Vardar	17
6	(North Macedonia) Zoran Miserdovski	Bashkimi	14
7	(North Macedonia) Ismail Ismaili	Shkëndija	12
7	(North Macedonia) Aleksandar Toleski	Cementarnica	12
7	(North Macedonia) Nikolche Zdravevski	Pobeda	12

Source: rsssf.org

== See also ==
- 2004–05 Macedonian Football Cup
- 2004–05 Macedonian Second Football League
