= Marjan Gerasimovski =

Macedonian footballer (born 1974)

Personal information
- Date of birth: 12 March 1974 (age 52)
- Place of birth: Tetovo, SFR Yugoslavia
- Position: Defender

Team information
- Current team: Vardar (assistant coach)

Senior career*
| Years | Team | Apps | (Gls) |
| 1995–1997 | Cementarnica | 16 | (0) |
| 1997–1998 | Vardar | 31 | (2) |
| 1998–2001 | Partizan | 50 | (5) |
| 2001–2002 | Legia Warsaw | 7 | (0) |
| 2002–2005 | Cementarnica | 14 | (0) |
| 2005–2006 | Madžari Solidarnost | | |

International career
| 1999–2000 | Macedonia | 9 | (0) |

Managerial career
- 2013–2015: Vardar (youth)
- 2015: Metalurg Skopje (head coach)
- 2021–2023: Borec (assistant coach)
- 2021: Borec (head coach)
- 2023–: Vardar (assistant coach)
- * Club domestic league appearances and goals

Marjan Gerasimovski (Macedonian Cyrillic: Марјан Герасимовски; born 12 March 1974) is a Macedonian professional football manager and former player. He is currently the assistant coach of Vardar.

== Club career ==
After playing for the country champions Vardar Gerasimovski signed with Serbian club Partizan where he played three seasons and also played in the national team. Before returning to Macedonia, he played one season for the Polish club Legia Warsaw.

== International career ==
Gerasimovski made his senior debut for Macedonia in a February 1999 friendly match away against Albania and earned nine caps, scoring no goals. His final international was an October 2000 FIFA World Cup qualification match against Moldova. He did win a tenth cap, although in an unofficial match against Hungary in November 2000.

== Coaching career ==
At the beginning of the 2013–14 season Gerasimovski was coaching one of Vardar's youth teams.

== Honours ==
Vardar Skopje

- Macedonian Cup: 1997–98

Partizan

- First League of FR Yugoslavia: 1998–99
- FR Yugoslavia Cup: 2000–01

Legia Warsaw

- Ekstraklasa: 2001–02
- Polish League Cup: 2001–02

Cementarnica Skopje

- Macedonian Cup: 2002–03
