= Ljubodrag Milošević =

Macedonian association football player

Personal information
- Full name: Ljubodrag Milošević
- Date of birth: 12 November 1969 (age 56)
- Place of birth: SFR Yugoslavia
- Position: Defender

Senior career*
Years	Team	Apps	(Gls)
1989–1993	Sileks		
1992–1994	Radnički Niš	23	(0)
1994–1998	Sileks		
1998–2000	Eendracht Aalst	17	(0)
2000–2001	Digenis Morphou	22	(1)
2001–2002	Bashkimi	13	(1)
2002–2003	Pobeda	6	(0)
2003–2004	Bregalnica Štip	8	(0)

International career
1997–1998	Macedonia	9	(0)

Managerial career
- 2012: Sileks
- 2013–2014: Gorno Lisiče
- * Club domestic league appearances and goals

Ljubodrag Milošević (Macedonian: Љубодраг Милошевиќ; born 12 November 1969) is a retired Macedonian international football player and coach.

== Club career ==
For almost ten years, Ljubodrag, played in Sileks Kratovo, only interrupted from January 2003 until January 2004, when he had a spell in Serbia in Radnički Niš. His next spell abroad was in 1998, when he went to Belgium to play two seasons in Eendracht Aalst, followed by one season in 2000 in Cyprus club Digenis Morphou. From 2001, he was back to Macedonia, where he ended his career in 2004.

== International career ==
Milošević, despite being from Serbian descent, made his senior debut for Macedonia in a June 1997 FIFA World Cup qualification match against Iceland in Skopje and has earned a total of 9 caps, scoring no goals. His final international was a June 1998 friendly match against Bosnia and Herzegovina.

== Honours ==
Sileks

- 3 times Macedonian Prva Liga Champion: 1995–96, 1996–97 and 1997–98
- 2 times Macedonian Cup winner: 1994 and 1997
