= Dimitar Kapinkovski =

Macedonian footballer

Personal information
- Full name: Dimitar Kapinkovski; Димитар Капинковски
- Date of birth: 27 May 1975 (age 51)
- Place of birth: Bitola, Macedonia
- Height: 1.76 m (5 ft 9 in)
- Position: Defender

Youth career
- 1988-1992: Pelister

Senior career*
Years	Team	Apps	(Gls)
1992-1995	Pelister	97	(4)
1995-1996	FK Cementarnica 55	35	(4)
1996-1999	FK Makedonija G.P.	90	(6)
1999-2003	Pelister	90	(5)
2003-2008	FK Pobeda	150	(9)
2009-2010	KF Bylis Ballsh	20	(1)
2010-2011	FK 11 Oktomvri	15	(1)

International career^{‡}
2001–2003	Macedonia	9	(0)

Managerial career
- 2014: Pelister (interim)
- 2014-2015: FK Pelister (Assistant coach)
- 2019-2020: Pelister (Assistant coach)
- 2020-2022: Pelister Head coach
- 2022-2023: FK Pobeda Head coach
- 2023-2024: FC Samtredia Head coach
- * Club domestic league appearances and goals as of 14 August 2010 ‡ National team caps and goals as of 11 August 2010

Dimitar Kapinkovski (Macedonian: Димитар Капинковски; born 27 May 1975) is a retired Macedonian football player and current coach, which was recently managed FK Pelister as interim coach.

== International career ==
He made his senior debut for Macedonia in a July 2001 friendly match against Qatar and has earned a total of 9 caps, scoring no goals. His final international was an October 2003 friendly away against Ukraine.

== Honours ==
- FK Pelister Bitola
  - Macedonian Football Cup: 2000–01 (winner)
- FK Pobeda Prilep
  - Macedonian First League: 2003–04 (winner); 2006–07 (winner)
  - Macedonian Football Cup: 2006–07 (runner-up)
