= 2004–05 Macedonian Football Cup =

Tournament details
- Country: Macedonia
- Dates: 1 August 2004 – 24 May 2005
- Teams: 32

Final positions
- Champions: Bashkimi (1st title)
- Runners-up: Madjari Solidarnost

Tournament statistics
- Matches played: 44
- Goals scored: 127 (2.89 per match)

The 2004–05 Macedonian Football Cup was the 13th season of Macedonia's football knockout competition. Sloga Jugomagnat were the defending champions, having won their third title. The 2004–05 champions were Bashkimi who won their first title.

== Competition calendar ==
Round	Date(s)	Fixtures	Clubs	New entries
First Round	1 August 2004	16	32 → 16	32
Second Round	22 September & 27 October 2004	16	16 → 8	none
Quarter-finals	1 December 2004 & 22 March 2005	8	8 → 4	none
Semi-finals	6 April & 4 May 2005	4	4 → 2	none
Final	24 May 2005	1	2 → 1	none

== First round ==
Matches were played on 1 August 2004.

Team 1	Score	Team 2
1 August 2004
Kumanovo (3)	1–1 (4–1 p)	Novaci (3)
Shkëndija 79 (1)	0–0 (5–6 p)	Tikvesh (2)
Bashkimi (1)	3–0	Belasica (1)
Sloga Vinica (3)	1–5	Turnovo (2)
Miravci (3)	5–1	Ovche Pole (3)
Lozar (3)	4–1	Partizan Obrshani (3)
Napredok (1)	2–2 (5–4 p)	Sileks (1)
Vëllazërimi (2)	3–0 (w/o)	Malesh (3)
Skopje (2)	1–2	Bregalnica Kraun (1)
Vardar (1)	2–1	Pobeda (1)
Karaorman (3)	2–2 (3–4 p)	Makedonija G.P. (2)
Crna Reka (3)	0–3 (w/o)	Sateska (3)
Rabotnički Kometal (1)	5–0	Bregalnica Delchevo (2)
Korabi (3)	0–4	Sloga Jugomagnat (1)
Gostivar (3)	2–3	Cementarnica (1)
Borec (3)	0–2	Madjari Solidarnost (1)

== Second round ==
The first legs were played on 22 September and second were played on 27 October 2004.

Team 1	Agg.	Team 2	1st leg	2nd leg
Makedonija G.P. (2)	0–4	Sloga Jugomagnat (1)	0–2	0–2
Tikvesh (2)	2–3	Vëllazërimi (2)	1–0	1–3
Bregalnica Kraun (1)	2–2 (3–1 p)	Lozar (3)	2–0	0–2 (a.e.t.)
Kumanovo (3)	1–6	Sileks (1)	0–2	1–4
Rabotnichki Kometal (1)	4–0	Vardar (1)	3–0	1–0
Madjari Solidarnost (1)	2–1	Cementarnica (1)	1–0	1–1
Sateska (3)	2–14	Bashkimi (1)	2–7	0–7
Miravci (3)	1–9	Turnovo (2)	1–3	0–6

== Quarter-finals ==
The first legs were played on 1 December 2004 and second were played on 23 March 2005.

=== Summary ===
Team 1	Agg.	Team 2	1st leg	2nd leg
Turnovo (2)	4–2	Vëllazërimi (2)	2–1	2–1
Rabotnichki Kometal (1)	0–2	Sileks (1)	0–2	0–0
Bregalnica Kraun (1)	0–1	Bashkimi (1)	0–0	0–1
Madjari Solidarnost (1)	2–1	Sloga Jugomagnat (1)	2–0	0–1

=== Matches ===
1 December 2004
13:00 CET

Turnovo (2)	2–1	Vëllazërimi (2)
Micevski 56'; Andonov 85'	Report	Endekoski 75'

Stadion Kukush, Turnovo
Attendance: 250
Referee: Sasho Lazarevski (Kumanovo)
23 March 2005
14:00 CET

Vëllazërimi (2)	1–2	Turnovo (2)
Cuculi 48'	Report	Boshnjakov 15'; Blazhevski 54'

Vëllazërimi Arena, Kichevo
Attendance: 800
Referee: Emil Bozhinovski (Skopje)

Turnovo won 4–2 on aggregate.

1 December 2004
13:00 CET

Rabotnichki Kometal (1)	0–2	Sileks (1)
	Report	Ristić 38', 60'

Gradski stadion, Skopje
Attendance: 500
Referee: Borka Smokovski (Prilep)
23 March 2005
14:00 CET

Sileks (1)	0–0	Rabotnichki Kometal (1)
	Report

Stadion Sileks, Kratovo
Attendance: 500
Referee: Bekim Bauta (Struga)

Sileks won 2–0 on aggregate.

1 December 2004
13:00 CET

Bregalnica Kraun (1)	0–0	Bashkimi (1)
	Report

Gradski stadion, Shtip
Attendance: 500
Referee: Goran Spirkoski (Prilep)
23 March 2005
14:00 CET

Bashkimi (1)	1–0	Bregalnica Kraun (1)
Kerimi 89'	Report

Gradski stadion, Kumanovo
Attendance: 700
Referee: Goran Spirkoski (Prilep)

Bashkimi won 1–0 on aggregate.

1 December 2004
13:00 CET

Madjari Solidarnost (1)	2–0	Sloga Jugomagnat (1)
Gjurchevski 54'; Despotovski 89'	Report

Stadion Boris Trajkovski, Skopje
Attendance: 250
Referee: Ljubomir Krstevski (Bitola)
23 March 2005
14:00 CET

Sloga Jugomagnat (1)	1–0	Madjari Solidarnost (1)
Simonovski 7' (o.g.)	Report

Stadion Chair, Skopje
Attendance: 400
Referee: Aleksandar Stavrev (Skopje)

Madjari Solidarnost won 2–1 on aggregate.

== Semi-finals ==
The first legs were played on 6 April and the second on 4 May 2005.

=== Summary ===
Team 1	Agg.	Team 2	1st leg	2nd leg
Sileks (1)	1–2	Bashkimi (1)	1–0	0–2
Madjari Solidarnost (1)	1–0	Turnovo (2)	1–0	0–0

=== Matches ===
6 April 2005
16:00 CEST

Sileks (1)	1–0	Bashkimi (1)
Todorovski 79'

Stadion Sileks, Kratovo
Referee: Emil Bozhinovski (Bitola)
4 May 2005
16:00 CEST

Bashkimi (1)	2−0	Sileks (1)
Presilski 6'; Da Silva 20'	Report

Gradski stadion, Kumanovo
Attendance: 5,000
Referee: Goran Spirkoski (Prilep)

Bashkimi won 2–1 on aggregate.

6 April 2005
16:00 CEST

Madjari Solidarnost (1)	1–0	Turnovo (2)
Siljanoski 80'

Stadion Boris Trajkovski, Skopje
Referee: Sasho Lazarevski (Kumanovo)
4 May 2005
16:00 CEST

Turnovo (2)	0−0	Madjari Solidarnost (1)
	Report

Stadion Kukush, Turnovo
Attendance: 1,500
Referee: Sasho Lazarevski (Kumanovo)

Madjari Solidarnost won 1–0 on aggregate.

== Final ==
24 May 2005
20:30 CEST

Bashkimi (1)	2–1	Madjari Solidarnost (1)
Presilski 77', 90+2'	Report 1 Report 2	Aleksovski 12'

Gradski stadion, Skopje
Attendance: 8,000
Referee: Goran Spirkoski (Prilep)

== See also ==
- 2004–05 Macedonian First Football League
- 2004–05 Macedonian Second Football League
