= Blaže Georgioski =

Macedonian footballer

Personal information
- Full name: Blaže Georgioski; Блаже Георгиоски
- Date of birth: 1 December 1975 (age 50)
- Place of birth: Prilep, SFR Yugoslavia
- Height: 1.75 m (5 ft 9 in)
- Position: Midfielder

Senior career*
Years	Team	Apps	(Gls)
1994–1997	Pobeda	47	(8)
1998–1999	Sartid	23	(1)
1999–2000	Red Star Belgrade	25	(3)
2000–2006	Pobeda	41	(18)
2006–2008	Preston Lions	45	(12)

International career^{‡}
2000–2005	Republic of Macedonia	7	(0)
- * Club domestic league appearances and goals ‡ National team caps and goals as of 2 December 2009

Blaže Georgioski (Macedonian Cyrillic: Блаже Георгиоски; born 1 December 1975, in Prilep) is a Macedonian retired football player.

== Club career ==
Born in Prilep, he started his career in 1994 in his home town club FK Pobeda. In 1998, he moved to Serbia to play in FK Sartid, club nowadays called FK Smederevo. His good exhibitions make him move to the giants European 1991 Champions FK Crvena Zvezda where he won the Championship in the season 1999–2000. After having returned to play again in Pobeda Prilep, in 2006 he moved to Australia to play in the Victorian Premier League club Preston Lions FC, where he played for 2 years winning the VPL final for Preston Lions in 2007.

== International career ==
Since his good exhibitions with Red Star that Georgioski started receiving calls to the national squad. He made his senior debut for Macedonia in a February 2000 friendly match against Yugoslavia and has earned a total of 7 caps, scoring no goals. His final international was a November 2005 friendly against Iran.

== Honours ==
- Red Star Belgrade
  - 1 time First League of FR Yugoslavia Champion: 1999–00
  - 1 time Yugoslav Cup winner: 2000
- Pobeda Prilep
  - 1 time Macedonian Prva Liga Champion: 2003–04
  - 1 time Macedonian Cup winner: 2002
- Preston Lions
  - 1 time Victorian Premier League Champion: 2007
