= 2005–06 Macedonian First Football League =

Macedonian First League
- Season: 2005–06
- Dates: 5 August 2005 – 21 May 2006
- Champions: Rabotnichki; 2nd domestic title
- Relegated: Cementarnica; Belasica
- Champions League: Rabotnichki
- UEFA Cup: Makedonija G.P. Vardar
- Intertoto Cup: Pobeda
- Matches played: 198
- Goals scored: 564 (2.85 per match)
- Top goalscorer: Stevica Ristić (27 goals)
- Biggest home win: Bashkimi 6–0 Belasica (26 March 2006)
- Biggest away win: Bregalnica 0–4 Makedonija (6 November 2005)
- Highest scoring: Belasica 4–6 Sileks (3 May 2006)

The 2005–06 Macedonian First League was the 14th season of the Macedonian First Football League, the highest football league of Macedonia. The first matches of the season were played on 5 August 2005 and the last on 21 May 2006. Rabotnichki defended their championship title, having won their second title in a row.

== Promotion and relegation ==
At the start of the 2005–06 season

Promoted from 2004–05 Second League

- Vëllazërimi (winners)
- Renova (runners-up)
- Makedonija G.P. (Third placed; won play-off match)

Relegated to 2005–06 Second League

- Madjari Solidarnost (10th; lost play-off match)
- Sloga Jugomagnat (11th)
- Napredok (12th)

At the end of the 2005–06 season

Promoted from 2005–06 Second League

- Pelister (winners)
- Napredok (runners-up)

Relegated to 2006–07 Second League

- Cementarnica 55 (11th)
- Belasica (12th)

== Participating teams ==
Location of teams in 2005–06 Macedonian First League

Club	City	Stadium	Capacity
Bashkimi	Kumanovo	Gradski stadion Kumanovo	7,000
Belasica	Strumica	Stadion Mladost	6,370
Bregalnica Kraun	Shtip	Gradski stadion Shtip	4,000
Cementarnica 55	Skopje	Stadion Cementarnica	2,000
Makedonija G.P.	Skopje	Stadion Gjorche Petrov	3,000
Pobeda	Prilep	Stadion Goce Delchev	15,000
Rabotnichki Kometal	Skopje	Gradski stadion Skopje	18,104
Renova	Djepchishte	Gradski stadion Tetovo	15,000
Shkëndija 79	Tetovo	Gradski stadion Tetovo	15,000
Sileks	Kratovo	Stadion Sileks	5,000
Vardar	Skopje	Gradski stadion Skopje	18,104
Vëllazërimi	Kichevo	Gradski stadion Kichevo	5,000

== League table ==
Pos	Team	Pld	W	D	L	GF	GA	GD	Pts	Qualification or relegation
1	Rabotnichki Kometal (C)	33	21	9	3	64	26	+38	72	Qualification for the Champions League first qualifying round
2	Makedonija G.P.	33	21	6	6	55	23	+32	69	Qualification for the UEFA Cup first qualifying round
3	Vardar	33	19	7	7	42	19	+23	64	Qualification for the UEFA Cup first qualifying round
4	Pobeda	33	16	6	11	58	46	+12	54	Qualification for the Intertoto Cup first round
5	Shkëndija	33	15	4	14	48	47	+1	49	
6	Bashkimi	33	13	6	14	50	49	+1	45	
7	Renova	33	13	5	15	45	49	−4	44	
8	Vëllazërimi	33	13	4	16	44	57	−13	43	
9	Sileks (O)	33	10	11	12	54	58	−4	41	Qualification for the relegation play-offs
10	Bregalnica Kraun (O)	33	10	6	17	44	55	−11	36	Qualification for the relegation play-offs
11	Cementarnica 55 (R)	33	8	8	17	38	51	−13	32	Relegation to the Macedonian Second League
12	Belasica (R)	33	2	2	29	22	84	−62	8	Relegation to the Macedonian Second League

Source: MacedonianFootball.com, RSSSF.org
Rules for classification: 1) Points; 2) Goal difference; 3) Goals scored; 4) Head-to-head points; 5) Head-to-head goal difference; 6) Head-to-head away goals scored (only if two teams); 7) Head-to-head goals scored; 8) Draw; 9) Play-off. (Note: Criteria 2, 3 and 8 is only used if not deciding Champion, teams for UEFA competitions or relegation).
(C) Champions; (O) Play-off winners; (R) Relegated

== Results ==
Every team will play three times against each other team for a total of 33 matches. The first 22 matchdays will consist of a regular double round-robin schedule. The league standings at this point will then be used to determine the games for the last 11 matchdays.

Home \ Away	BAS	BEL	BRE	CEM	MGP	POB	RAB	REN	SKE	SIL	VAR	VLZ	BAS	BEL	BRE	CEM	MGP	POB	RAB	REN	SKE	SIL	VAR	VLZ
Bashkimi	—	2–1	2–2	3–2	5–0	2–1	1–1	3–2	4–2	1–1	0–1	0–1	—	6–0	2–3	2–0	—	2–0	—	—	—	—	1–1	2–1
Belasica	0–2	—	0–1	0–2	0–2	2–5	1–2	2–0	1–2	1–1	0–2	0–1	—	—	—	—	1–4	—	0–3	0–2	0–3	4–6	—	—
Bregalnica Kraun	0–1	3–1	—	2–1	0–4	2–0	1–2	2–1	2–0	1–2	0–3	1–1	—	6–1	—	0–0	1–2	—	0–0	—	0–0	—	—	—
Cementarnica 55	1–0	3–0	1–2	—	2–2	2–2	2–2	2–0	1–2	2–0	0–1	3–1	—	1–1	—	—	0–2	—	0–0	—	3–1	3–2	—	—
Makedonija	3–0	1–0	1–0	4–0	—	1–0	0–3	3–0	1–0	3–1	1–0	3–0	2–0	—	—	—	—	3–0	0–0	0–0	—	1–1	—	6–2
Pobeda	3–1	3–0	3–0	3–0	1–1	—	3–3	2–1	1–0	2–1	0–1	1–0	—	2–1	3–0	1–0	—	—	—	—	3–0	—	2–0	1–2
Rabotnichki	2–0	3–0	7–2	3–1	1–0	1–1	—	1–0	3–0	3–1	1–0	2–1	0–0	—	—	—	—	2–1	—	3–1	—	1–0	1–3	4–0
Renova	1–0	2–3	2–1	2–1	2–0	2–0	1–1	—	0–2	1–1	0–1	4–3	4–3	—	2–1	2–1	—	3–0	—	—	—	—	1–0	—
Shkëndija	0–1	2–0	1–4	1–0	2–1	4–5	2–1	2–1	—	4–1	2–1	2–1	1–0	—	—	—	0–1	—	2–1	1–2	—	2–2	—	5–1
Sileks	4–1	1–0	4–3	3–2	0–2	2–2	2–4	1–1	1–1	—	0–2	1–1	3–0	—	3–3	—	—	4–2	—	2–0	—	—	0–0	—
Vardar	3–1	2–1	1–0	1–1	1–0	1–1	0–2	1–1	1–0	2–0	—	2–0	—	3–0	1–0	2–0	0–0	—	—	—	2–2	—	—	3–0
Vëllazërimi	2–2	3–1	2–1	4–0	0–1	2–4	0–1	4–3	1–0	0–1	1–0	—	—	3–0	1–0	0–0	—	—	—	2–1	—	3–2	—	—

Source: RSSSF.org
Legend: Blue = home team win; Yellow = draw; Red = away team win.

== Relegation playoff ==
28 May 2006
17:00 CEST

Bregalnica Kraun	3–3 (a.e.t.)	Karaorman
Davitkov 31', 35' (pen.); Đilas 102'	Report	Delioski 51'; Mimini 82'; Dalchevski 98'
Penalties
Zdravkov (penalty scored); Andonov (penalty scored); Dimitrovski (penalty scored); Stanković (penalty scored)	4–3	(penalty scored) Stepanovski; (penalty scored) Vasilev; (penalty scored) Klechkarovski; (penalty missed) Pereski; (penalty missed) Shaleski

Gradski stadion, Skopje
Attendance: 4,000
Referee: Emil Bozhinovski (Skopje)

28 May 2006
17:00 CEST

Sileks	1–0	Madjari Solidarnost
Ristić 4'	Report

Stadion Goce Delchev, Prilep
Attendance: 800
Referee: Dragi Stojanovski (Kumanovo)

== Top goalscorers ==
Rank	Player	Club	Goals
1	(North Macedonia) Stevica Ristić	Sileks	27
2	(North Macedonia) Filip Ivanovski	Makedonija G.P.	22
3	(North Macedonia) Riste Naumov	Vardar	15
4	(North Macedonia) Aleksandar Toleski	Cementarnica	14

== See also ==
- 2005–06 Macedonian Football Cup
- 2005–06 Macedonian Second Football League
