= Nikola Ilievski =

Macedonian football coach

Personal information
- Full name: Nikola Ilievski
- Date of birth: 16 December 1954 (age 71)
- Place of birth: Skopje, PR Macedonia, Yugoslavia
- Height: 1.78 m (5 ft 10 in)
- Position: Midfielder

Senior career*
| Years | Team | Apps | (Gls) |
| 1971–1974 | Vardar | | |
| 1974–1975 | Rabotnički | | |
| 1975–1977 | Pobeda | | |
| 1977–1978 | Ohrid | | |
| 1978–1979 | Teteks | 12 | (0) |
| 1979–1980 | Vardar | | |
| 1980–1981 | Priština | 16 | (1) |
| 1981–1982 | Kastoria | 14 | (0) |
| 1982–1988 | Vardar | 17 | (1) |
| 1981–1982 | → Radnički Pirot (loan) | | |
| 1982–1988 | → Metalurg Skopje (loan) | | |
| Total | | 59 | (2) |

Managerial career
- 1989–1990: Rabotnički
- 1990–1991: Kumanovo
- 1991–1992: Metalurg Skopje
- 1992–1993: Sasa
- 1993–1994: Macedonia (assistant)
- 1993–1994: Belasica
- 1994–1995: Ljuboten
- 1995–1996: Rudar Probištip
- 1996–1997: FK Skopje
- 1999–2000: Celje
- 2000–2001: Pobeda
- 2001–2002: Macedonia U21
- 2002–2003: Macedonia
- 2004: Pobeda
- 2005–2006: Celje
- 2008: CSM Râmnicu Vâlcea
- 2009: Metalurg Skopje
- 2010–2011: Bylis
- 2011: Bangladesh
- 2013: Vardar
- 2015–2017: Persijap Jepara
- 2018–2019: Renova
- 2019–2020: Kadino
- 2021: Vardar
- * Club domestic league appearances and goals

Nikola Ilievski (Macedonian: Никола Илиевски; born 16 December 1954) is a Macedonian football coach and former player.

== Playing career ==
Born in Skopje, during his playing career he played with FK Ohrid, FK Vardar, FK Rabotnichki, FK Priština and FK Radnički Pirot in Yugoslavia and with Kastoria F.C. in Greece.

== Managerial career ==
After finishing the coaching degree in the Faculty of Physical Culture in the University of Belgrade he started his coaching career. He was coach of the Macedonia national football team from 2002 to 2003. He spent two spells as manager of FK Pobeda, leading them into the UEFA Cup in 2000 and to the 2003–04 Macedonian First League won championship.

In January 2013 Ilievski was appointed as the new manager of FK Vardar after dismissal of Blagoja Milevski, although interested the club's rival FK Pelister, but on 13 April, after a loss in Eternal derby against Pelister, was resigned due to underperforming in the league.

In January 2015, he signed with Persijap Jepara.

== Honours ==
=== Player ===
- Macedonian Republic League: 1987
- Macedonian Republic Cup: 1972, 1973, 1974, 1977, 1980

=== Manager ===
Pobeda

- Macedonian First League: 2003–04
- Macedonian Cup: 2001–02

Celje

- Slovenian Cup runner-up: 2005–06

== Managerial statistics ==
| Team | From | To | P | W | D | L | GS | GA | %W |
|---|---|---|---|---|---|---|---|---|---|
| Bangladesh | 15 June 2011 | 20 December 2011 | 7 | 2 | 2 | 3 | 6 | 8 | 28.57 |
| Bangladesh U20 | 15 June 2011 | 20 December | 4 | 1 | 0 | 3 | 3 | 11 | 25.00 |

P – Total of played matches W – Won matches D – Drawn matches L – Lost matches GS – Goal scored GA – Goals against
%W – Percentage of matches won
