= Sašo Krstev =

Macedonian footballer

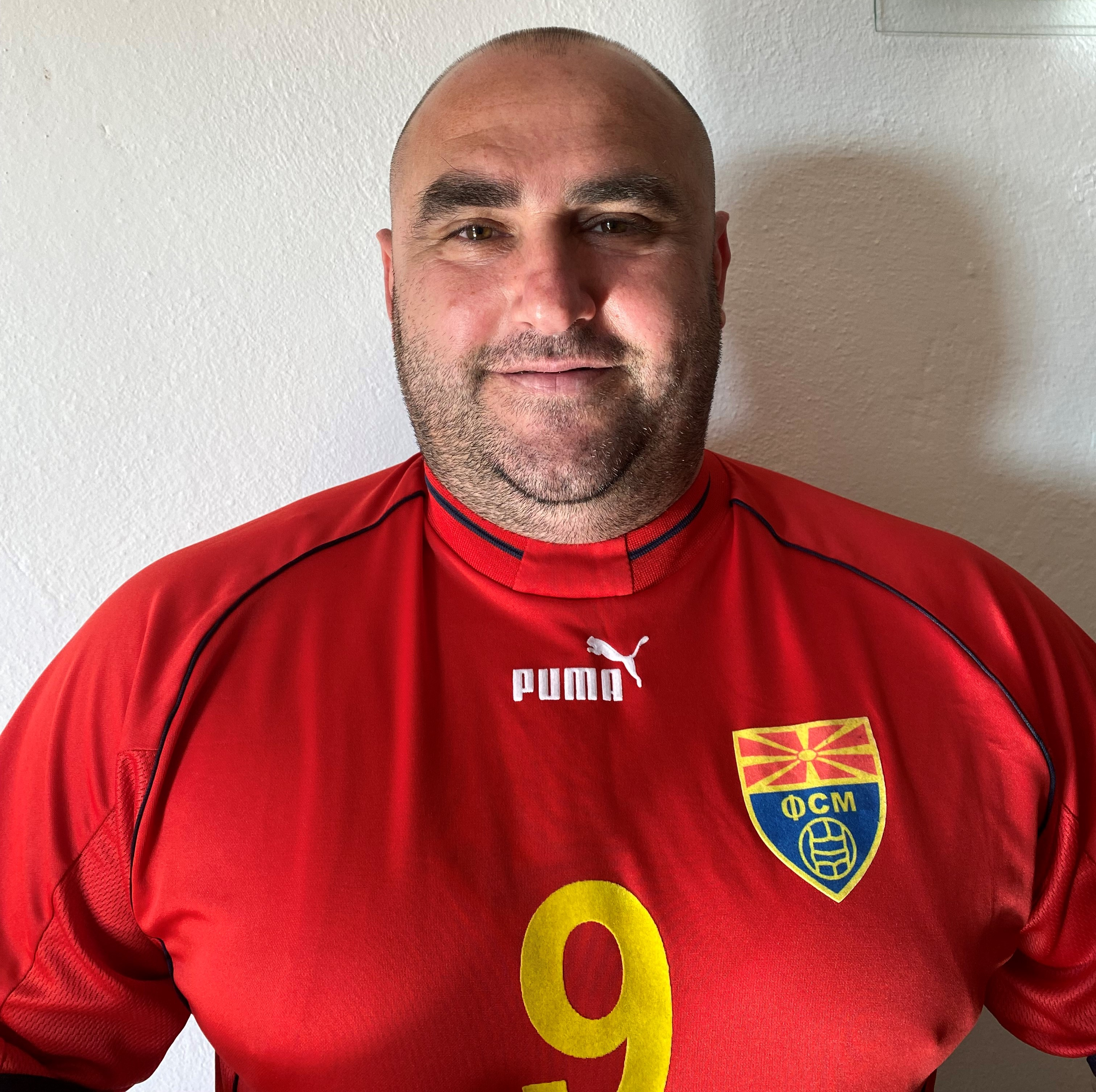

Personal information
- Full name: Saško Krstev; Сашо Крстев
- Date of birth: 1 November 1975 (age 50)
- Place of birth: Negotino, SFR Yugoslavia
- Height: 1.79 m (5 ft 10 in)
- Position: Striker

Youth career
- Vardar Negotino

Senior career*
Years	Team	Apps	(Gls)
1998–2000	Vardar	51	(18)
2000–2005	Pobeda	122	(44)
2006	Vëllazërimi	11	(2)
2006	Pobeda	5	(0)
2007	Renova	12	(3)
2007–2008	Milano Kumanovo	4	(1)
2008–2009	Vardar Negotino	9	(2)
Total		214	(70)

International career
2001–2005	Macedonia	6	(0)
- * Club domestic league appearances and goals as of 24 October 2015

Sašo Krstev or Saško Krstev (Macedonian: Сашо Крстев; born 1 November 1975) is a Macedonian retired international footballer who last played for FK Vardar Negotino.

== International career ==
He made his senior debut for Macedonia in a March 2001 FIFA World Cup qualification match away against Sweden and has earned a total of 6 caps, scoring no goals. His final international was a November 2005 friendly match against Iran.

== Honours and awards ==
- FK Vardar
  - Macedonian Cup:
    - Winner (2): 1997–98, 1998–99
- FK Pobeda
  - Macedonian First League:
    - Winner (1): 2003–04
  - Macedonian Cup:
    - Winner (1): 2001–02
