= 2004–05 Macedonian Second Football League =

Macedonian Second League
- Season: 2004–05
- Champions: Vëllazërimi
- Promoted: Vëllazërimi; Renova; Makedonija G.P.
- Relegated: Tikvesh; Bregalnica Delchevo; Shkëndija Arachinovo

The 2004–05 Macedonian Second Football League was the thirteenth season since its establishment. It began on 7 August 2004 and ended on 28 May 2005.

== Participating teams ==
Location of teams in 2004–05 Macedonian Second League

Club	City	Stadium	Capacity
Bratstvo	Resen (Novaci)	Stadion Novaci	500
Bregalnica	Delchevo	Gradski stadion Goce Delchev	4,000
Makedonija G.P.	Skopje	Stadion Gjorche Petrov	3,000
Mladost	Sushica	Stadion Sushica	1,500
Pelister	Bitola	Stadion Tumbe Kafe	8,000
Renova	Djepchishte	Stadion Djepchishte	1,000
Skopje	Skopje	Stadion Avtokomanda	4,000
Shkëndija	Arachinovo	Stadion Arachinovo	2,000
Teteks	Tetovo	Gradski stadion Tetovo	15,000
Tikvesh	Kavadarci	Gradski Stadion Kavadarci	7,500
Turnovo	Turnovo	Stadion Kukush	1,500
Vëllazërimi	Kichevo	Gradski stadion Kichevo	5,000

== League table ==
Pos	Team	Pld	W	D	L	GF	GA	GD	Pts	Promotion or relegation
1	Vëllazërimi (C, P)	33	24	3	6	70	34	+36	75	Promotion to Macedonian First League
2	Renova (P)	33	22	5	6	63	27	+36	71	Promotion to Macedonian First League
3	Makedonija GP (P)	33	22	5	6	76	34	+42	71	Qualification to Promotion play-off
4	Turnovo	33	18	4	11	59	40	+19	58	Qualification to Promotion play-off
5	Teteks	33	17	5	11	46	31	+15	56	
6	Pelister	33	12	7	14	40	43	−3	43	
7	Skopje	33	11	8	14	46	49	−3	41	
8	Bratstvo Resen	33	9	10	14	32	45	−13	37	
9	Mladost Sushica	33	10	7	16	32	46	−14	37	
10	Tikvesh (R)	33	9	4	20	36	55	−19	31	Qualification to Relegation play-off
11	Bregalnica Delchevo (R)	33	6	5	22	29	76	−47	23	Relegation to Macedonian Third League
12	Shkëndija Arachinovo (R)	33	5	3	25	30	79	−49	18	Relegation to Macedonian Third League

Source: MacedonianFootball.com, RSSSF.org
Rules for classification: 1) Points; 2) Head-to-head points; 3) Head-to-head goal difference; 4) Head-to-head away goals scored
(C) Champions; (P) Promoted; (R) Relegated

== Results ==
Every team will play three times against each other team for a total of 33 matches. The first 22 matchdays will consist of a regular double round-robin schedule. The league standings at this point will then be used to determine the games for the last 11 matchdays.

=== Matches 1–22 ===
Home \ Away	BRA	BRD	MGP	MLA	PEL	REN	SKA	SKO	TET	TIK	TUR	VLZ
Bratstvo Resen	—	0–0	0–0	1–0	2–1	2–1	1–0	2–0	1–1	1–0	1–2	1–2
Bregalnica Delchevo	1–3	—	0–3	2–2	1–0	2–1	2–0	1–1	1–2	2–1	0–2	0–2
Makedonija	4–1	4–0	—	3–0	5–1	2–2	3–1	4–2	0–1	2–1	2–1	1–1
Mladost Sushica	2–2	1–0	0–2	—	0–0	2–0	3–0	0–0	1–0	2–0	1–0	1–2
Pelister	2–1	1–0	1–1	2–0	—	2–1	1–0	2–2	1–3	2–0	2–0	4–3
Renova	3–1	4–1	1–1	2–0	3–1	—	2–0	2–0	1–0	3–0	3–0	2–1
Shkëndija Arachinovo	1–0	3–0	2–5	2–1	0–1	1–4	—	2–2	1–2	3–0	1–1	2–3
Skopje	1–0	3–1	1–2	2–1	3–1	0–0	2–0	—	0–1	2–2	4–2	1–0
Teteks	2–0	4–2	2–0	0–0	2–1	0–0	5–1	3–3	—	2–0	1–0	0–1
Tikvesh	0–0	3–0	1–2	2–0	1–0	0–2	3–2	0–1	2–1	—	3–0	0–4
Turnovo	4–0	8–4	2–1	2–0	0–0	4–0	2–0	2–1	0–0	2–1	—	3–0
Vëllazërimi	2–0	4–1	4–0	5–1	2–0	2–1	3–0	3–2	2–0	4–0	1–0	—

Source: RSSSF.org
Legend: Blue = home team win; Yellow = draw; Red = away team win.

=== Matches 23–33 ===
Home \ Away	BRA	BRD	MGP	MLA	PEL	REN	SKA	SKO	TET	TIK	TUR	VLZ
Bratstvo Resen	—	—	—	—	—	—	2–0	—	1–4	1–1	5–1	0–0
Bregalnica Delchevo	1–1	—	0–3	—	—	1–4	—	1–0	—	2–1	—	—
Makedonija	2–0	—	—	—	3–2	—	6–1	—	3–0	3–1	3–1	—
Mladost Sushica	1–1	3–0	0–3	—	—	1–3	—	3–1	—	—	—	—
Pelister	1–1	2–0	—	1–1	—	—	4–0	—	—	3–1	—	—
Renova	3–0	—	1–0	—	2–0	—	4–0	—	—	2–0	2–1	—
Shkëndija Arachinovo	—	2–2	—	1–2	—	—	—	—	1–0	—	1–3	1–2
Skopje	2–0	—	1–2	—	1–1	1–2	2–0	—	—	1–0	—	—
Teteks	—	2–1	—	0–1	1–0	0–1	—	1–0	—	—	—	5–0
Tikvesh	—	—	—	2–1	—	—	6–1	—	2–1	—	2–2	0–1
Turnovo	—	3–0	—	3–1	1–0	—	—	2–0	3–0	—	—	2–0
Vëllazërimi	—	3–0	2–1	2–0	2–0	1–1	—	6–4	—	—	—	—

Source: RSSSF.org
Legend: Blue = home team win; Yellow = draw; Red = away team win.

== Promotion playoff ==
12 June 2005
17:00 CEST

Madžari Solidarnost	1–2	Makedonija G.P.
Karanfilovski 84'	Report	Ivanovski 73'; Tunevski 90+2'

Gradski stadion, Skopje
Attendance: 400
Referee: Bekim Bauta (Struga)

12 June 2005
17:00 CEST

Cementarnica 55	2–1	Turnovo
Spasovski 45'; Ristovski 89'	Report	Ivanov 20'

Stadion Goce Delchev, Prilep
Attendance: 1,000
Referee: Ljubomir Krstevski (Bitola)

== Relegation playoff ==
19 June 2005

Metalurg	2–1	Osogovo
Trifunov 65' (o.g.); Nichevski 68'		N. Georgiev 51'

Gradski stadion, Kavadarci

19 June 2005

Lozar	4–1	Drita
Ivanov 31' (pen.); R. Krstev 83'; Mizhorov 85', 88'		Bogoevski 78'

Stadion Gjorche Petrov, Skopje

19 June 2005

Karaorman	3–1 (a.e.t.)	Tikvesh
Tankoski 98'; Delioski 120', 120+7'	Report	Manev 120+5'

Gradski stadion, Skopje
Attendance: 1,000
Referee: Aleksandar Stavrev (Skopje)

== See also ==
- 2004–05 Macedonian Football Cup
- 2004–05 Macedonian First Football League
