= Aleksandar Stojanovski =

Macedonian footballer (born 1983)

Personal information
- Full name: Aleksandar Stojanovski
- Date of birth: February 4, 1983 (age 43)
- Place of birth: Skopje, SR Macedonia, SFR Yugoslavia
- Position: Striker

Senior career*
Years	Team	Apps	(Gls)
2004–2005	Belasica	28	(26)
2005–2006	Cibalia	20	(5)
2006–2007	Pobeda	10	(4)
2007–2008	Belasitsa Petrich	13	(0)
2008–2009	Napredok	15	(10)
2010–2011	Milano Kumanovo	10	(5)
2010–2011	Ohrid		
2011–2012	Sileks	10	(1)
2012	Serbian White Eagles	15	(4)
2014–2016	York Region Shooters	32	(15)
- * Club domestic league appearances and goals

Aleksandar Stojanovski (Macedonian: Александар Стојановски;born February 16, 1983) is a former Macedonian footballer played as a forward.

== Club career ==
=== Early career ===
Stojanovski played in the Macedonian First Football League with Belasica for the 2004–05 season. In his debut season, he recorded 26 goals, making him the league's top goalscorer.

=== Croatia ===
In 2005, he played abroad in the Croatian First Football League with Cibalia. He appeared in 23 matches and scored 4 goals in the Croatian top tier. He left the club after a single season in the Croatian national circuit.

=== Macedonia ===
After his brief stint in Croatia, he returned to Macedonia's top tier to sign with FK Pobeda where he won the league title.

=== Bulgaria ===
In the winter of 2008, he ventured abroad to the Bulgarian top-tier league with Belasitsa Petrich. He would appear in several preseason matches and contributed several goals.

=== Macedonia ===
He returned to the Macedonian national circuit to play with Napredok. His final season in the Macedonian first division was in the 2011–12 season with Sileks.

=== Canada ===
He would spend the 2012 summer season abroad in the Canadian Soccer League with the Serbian White Eagles. Stojanovski assisted the Serbs in securing a playoff berth by finishing sixth in the first division. The Serbs defeated SC Toronto in the opening round of the postseason. Toronto Croatia eliminated the Serbs from the playoffs in the next round.

Stojanovski returned to the Canadian circuit in 2014 to play in the league's second division with the York Region Shooters reserve team. He would re-sign with York Region for the next season and play with the senior team. He helped the club secure a playoff berth by finishing third in the league's first division. Stojanovski contributed a goal in the preliminary round of the postseason against Burlington SC that advanced the club to the next round. Their playoff journey concluded in the following round after an overtime loss by Toronto Croatia.

He returned for the 2016 season. In his third season with the Vaughan-based club, he assisted in securing the divisional title. Their opponents in the opening playoff round were Milton SC, where they advanced to the next stage. In the next round, York Region was eliminated by Hamilton City.

== Managerial ==
Stojanovski joined the coaching staff of Lyons Township soccer club.

== Honors ==
FK Pobeda

- Macedonian First Football League: 2006–07

York Region Shooters

- Canadian Soccer League First Division: 2016

Individual

- Macedonian First Football League Top Goal Scorer: 2004–05
