= Rade Karanfilovski =

Macedonian footballer

Personal information
- Full name: Rade Karanfilovski; Раде Каранфиловски
- Date of birth: 3 July 1968 (age 58)
- Place of birth: SFR Yugoslavia
- Position: Midfielder

Senior career*
Years	Team	Apps	(Gls)
1995–1998	Sileks		
1999–2003	Pobeda	69	(7)
2003–2005	Madžari Solidarnost	42	(4)

International career^{‡}
1995–2000	Macedonia	8	(1)

Managerial career
- –2015: FK Madžari Solidarnost
- * Club domestic league appearances and goals as of 16 May 2009 ‡ National team caps and goals as of 16 May 2009

Rade Karanfilovski (Macedonian: Раде Каранфиловски; born 3 July 1968) is a retired Macedonian football midfielder, who last played for FK Madžari Solidarnost, which was recently managed.

== International career ==
He made his senior debut for Macedonia in an October 1995 European Championship qualification match against Cyprus and has earned a total of 8 caps, scoring 1 goal. His final international was an October 2000 FIFA World Cup qualification match against Moldova.

== Career statistics ==
=== International ===
Scores and results list North Macedonia's goal tally first, score column indicates score after each Karamfilovski goal.

List of international goals scored by Rade Karanfilovski
No.	Date	Venue	Opponent	Score	Result	Competition
1	23 February 2000	Stadion Gradski Park, Skopje, Macedonia	FR Yugoslavia	1–2	1–2	Friendly

== External sources ==
- Rade Karanfilovski at National-Football-Teams.com
