= FC U Craiova 1948 in European football =

FC U Craiova 1948 is a Romanian football club which currently plays in Liga II.

== Total statistics ==
Competition	S	P	W	D	L	GF	GA	GD
UEFA Champions League / European Cup	1	2	1	0	1	2	3	–1
UEFA Cup Winners' Cup / European Cup Winners' Cup	1	4	2	0	2	7	6	+1
UEFA Europa League / UEFA Cup	4	8	0	3	5	3	9	–6
UEFA Intertoto Cup	2	8	4	2	2	15	11	+4
Total	8	22	7	5	10	27	29	–2

== Statistics by country ==
Country	Club	P	W	D	L	GF	GA	GD
Albania	Bylis Ballsh	2	1	1	0	4	3	+1
Subtotal		2	1	1	0	4	3	+1
Belarus	Dinamo Minsk	2	0	2	0	0	0	0
Subtotal		2	0	2	0	0	0	0
Cyprus	Apollon Limassol	2	1	0	1	2	3	–1
Subtotal		2	1	0	1	2	3	–1
Czech Republic / Czechoslovakia	Slovácko	2	0	1	1	4	5	–1
Czech Republic / Czechoslovakia	Sigma Olomouc	2	0	0	2	1	3	–2
Subtotal		4	0	1	3	5	8	–3
Faroe Islands	HB Tórshavn	2	2	0	0	7	0	+7
Subtotal		2	2	0	0	7	0	+7
France	PSG	2	0	0	2	0	6	–6
Subtotal		2	0	0	2	0	6	–6
(Georgia (country)) Georgia	Dinamo Tbilisi	2	0	0	2	1	4	–3
Subtotal		2	0	0	2	1	4	–3
Germany	Karlsruher SC	1	0	0	1	0	1	–1
Subtotal		1	0	0	1	0	1	–1
Latvia	Daugava	1	1	0	0	3	0	+3
Subtotal		1	1	0	0	3	0	+3
(North Macedonia) Republic of Macedonia	Pobeda Prilep	2	0	1	1	1	2	–1
Subtotal		2	0	1	1	1	2	–1
Serbia / Serbia and Montenegro	Čukarički	1	1	0	0	2	1	+1
Subtotal		1	1	0	0	2	1	+1
Slovakia	Spartak Trnava	1	1	0	0	2	1	+ 1
Subtotal		1	1	0	0	2	1	+1

== Statistics by competition ==
Notes for the abbreviations in the tables below:

- 1R: First round
- 2R: Second round
- PR: Preliminary round
- QR: Qualifying round

=== UEFA Champions League / European Cup ===
Season	Round	Club	Home	Away	Aggregate
1991–92	1R	(Cyprus) Apollon Limassol	2–0	0–3	2–3

=== UEFA Cup Winners' Cup / European Cup Winners' Cup ===
Season	Round	Club	Home	Away	Aggregate
1993–94	1R	(Faroe Islands) HB Tórshavn	4–0	3–0	7–0
1993–94	2R	(France) PSG	0–2	0–4	0–6

=== UEFA Europa League / UEFA Cup ===
Season	Round	Club	Home	Away	Aggregate
1992–93	1R	(Czech Republic) Sigma Olomouc	1–2	0–1	1–3
1994–95	PR	(Georgia (country)) Dinamo Tbilisi	1–2	0–2	1–4
1995–96	PR	(Belarus) Dinamo Minsk	0–0	0–0 (a.e.t.)	0–0 (1–3 p)
2000–01	QR	(North Macedonia) Pobeda Prilep	1–1	0–1	1–2

=== UEFA Intertoto Cup ===
Season	Round	Club	Home	Away	Aggregate
1996	Group stage (9)	(Latvia) Daugava	3–0	—N/a	2nd place
1996	Group stage (9)	(Germany) Karlsruher SC	—N/a	0–1	2nd place
1996	Group stage (9)	(Slovakia) Spartak Trnava	2–1	—N/a	2nd place
1996	Group stage (9)	(Serbia and Montenegro) Čukarički	—N/a	2–1	2nd place
2001	1R	(Albania) Bylis	3–3	1–0	4–3
2001	2R	(Czech Republic) Slovácko	2–2	2–3	4–5
