= 2002–03 Macedonian Second Football League =

Macedonian Second League
- Season: 2002–03
- Champions: Bashkimi
- Promoted: Bashkimi; Madjari Solidarnost
- Relegated: Kozhuf; Karaorman; Jaka; Ohrid; Sasa; Pobeda Valandovo

The 2002–03 Macedonian Second Football League was the eleventh season since its establishment. It began on 10 August 2002 and ended on 7 June 2003.

== Participating teams ==
Location of teams in 2002–03 Macedonian Second League

Club	City
11 Oktomvri	Prilep
Alumina	Skopje
Bashkimi	Kumanovo
Borec	Veles
Bregalnica	Shtip
Jaka	Radovish
Karaorman	Struga
Kozhuf	Gevgelija
Makedonija G.P.	Skopje
Madjari Solidarnost	Skopje
Novaci	Novaci
Ohrid 2001	Ohrid
Osogovo	Kochani
Pobeda	Valandovo
Sasa	Makedonska Kamenica
Shkëndija Arachinovo	Arachinovo
Shkëndija Tetovo	Tetovo
Teteks	Tetovo
Turnovo	Turnovo
Vëllazërimi	Kichevo

== League standing ==
Pos	Team	Pld	W	D	L	GF	GA	GD	Pts	Promotion or relegation
1	Bashkimi (C, P)	36	27	5	4	107	24	+83	86	Promotion to Macedonian First League
2	Madjari Solidarnost (P)	36	28	2	6	101	41	+60	86	Promotion to Macedonian First League
3	Teteks	36	20	6	10	66	33	+33	66	
4	Shkëndija Tetovo	36	20	6	10	71	42	+29	66	
5	Novaci	36	19	6	11	67	43	+24	63	
6	Bregalnica Shtip	36	19	5	12	66	43	+23	62	
7	Makedonija G.P.	36	17	6	13	57	44	+13	57	
8	Turnovo	36	17	3	16	59	58	+1	54	
9	Borec	36	16	5	15	56	43	+13	53	
10	Alumina	36	15	8	13	51	44	+7	53	
11	Vëllazërimi	36	16	5	15	54	57	−3	53	
12	Shkëndija Arachinovo	36	17	1	18	47	63	−16	52	
13	Osogovo	36	16	3	17	57	53	+4	51	
14	11 Oktomvri	36	15	4	17	77	68	+9	49	
15	Kozhuf (R)	36	14	3	19	40	65	−25	45	Relegation to Macedonian Third League
16	Karaorman (R)	36	11	4	21	45	69	−24	37	Relegation to Macedonian Third League
17	Ohrid 2001 (R)	36	8	1	27	45	100	−55	25	Relegation to Macedonian Third League
18	Jaka Radovish (R)	36	8	1	27	43	114	−71	25	Relegation to Macedonian Third League
19	Sasa (R)	36	2	0	34	12	117	−105	6	Relegation to Macedonian Third League
–	Pobeda Valandovo (Note: Pobeda Valandovo was removed from competition after 15th round. All matches annulled.) (R)	0	0	0	0	0	0	0	0	Withdrew from the competition

Source: MacedonianFootball.com, RSSSF.org
Rules for classification: 1) Points; 2) Head-to-head points; 3) Head-to-head goal difference; 4) Head-to-head away goals scored
(C) Champions; (P) Promoted; (R) Relegated

== Results ==
Home \ Away	OKT	ALU	BAS	BOR	BRE	JAK	KAR	KOZ	MGP	MAS	NOV	OHR	OSO	SAS	SKA	SKE	TET	TUR	VLZ
11 Oktomvri	—	4–3	2–5	2–1	0–0	7–0	3–2	2–0	2–1	1–3	3–2	7–1	2–0	9–0	3–0	3–1	0–3	3–0	1–1
Alumina	2–2	—	1–0	2–0	1–0	3–1	3–1	2–1	1–0	1–2	1–1	1–1	2–1	3–1	4–0	0–0	1–1	4–1	1–0
Bashkimi	6–1	3–1	—	2–1	2–0	6–0	6–1	7–0	3–0	2–2	3–2	8–0	4–0	3–0	5–0	5–0	2–0	5–0	7–0
Borec	2–0	1–0	1–1	—	2–3	1–0	0–0	2–0	4–1	1–3	1–2	3–1	0–1	7–0	1–0	3–2	0–0	1–1	2–1
Bregalnica Shtip	1–1	3–2	1–1	1–2	—	2–0	2–1	1–2	2–0	1–0	1–1	3–0 (Note: Match awarded)	2–0	7–0	4–0	3–1	0–0	3–0	3–2
Jaka Radovish	3–2	1–2	1–5	1–3	0–3	—	4–1	2–2	1–0	2–1	0–1	5–2	0–10	5–1	2–3	2–3	2–3	1–0	1–3
Karaorman	4–2	0–0	0–1	2–4	3–1	3–0	—	2–1	1–2	0–2	3–1	0–1	3–1	1–0	0–0	1–0	1–0	1–3	0–0
Kozhuf	1–0	2–0	1–0	1–0	3–4	1–0	2–1	—	2–0	1–2	2–0	3–0	0–1	1–0	2–1	0–0	2–1	2–3	0–0
Makedonija	3–2	2–2	1–0	1–1	2–0	3–0	4–0	2–1	—	1–3	1–0	3–1	2–1	9–0	2–0	2–0	2–0	2–2	1–1
Madjari Solidarnost	3–1	2–0	0–1	0–3	1–0	11–1	3–2	7–1	3–2	—	2–0	4–0	3–1	3–0	4–2	3–2	5–2	5–1	2–0
Novaci	5–3	2–1	0–1	1–0	3–1	3–0	3–2	2–0	1–1	2–2	—	3–0	5–1	3–0	6–0	1–0	2–1	1–0	3–0
Ohrid	2–4	0–3	0–3	2–4	1–3	4–2	1–3	4–1	1–2	1–2	1–3	—	2–6	4–0	3–1	0–1	1–3	1–2	4–0
Osogovo	1–0	1–1	1–2	1–0	3–0	3–1	3–1	2–0	1–3	0–2	0–0	2–0	—	1–0	1–0	1–1	3–0	2–1	1–3
Sasa	0–1	0–1	0–2	0–3	2–3	0–3	2–1	1–2	1–0	0–5	0–2	0–3	0–2	—	1–4	0–1	0–3	2–3	0–3
Shkëndija Arachinovo	4–1	4–2	1–2	1–0	2–0	2–0	1–0	1–0	0–1	2–3	3–1	4–1	2–1	2–1	—	1–0	1–0	2–1	2–1
Shkëndija Tetovo	2–1	1–0	3–0	3–0	2–1	8–2	3–0	2–1	2–0	3–1	3–3	3–0	4–3	7–0	3–0	—	2–2	3–0	2–0
Teteks	2–0	1–0	2–2	1–0	2–1	8–0	1–2	6–1	2–0	1–0	2–1	1–0	2–0	3–0	2–0	0–0	—	3–1	5–0
Turnovo	1–0	3–0	0–1	5–2	1–3	3–0	4–0	1–0	0–0	2–4	2–0	7–0	1–0	4–0	2–0	2–1	0–3	—	1–0
Vëllazërimi	3–2	1–0	1–1	1–0	0–3	1–0	5–2	6–1	3–1	1–3	2–1	0–2	4–1	3–0	3–1	1–2	1–0	3–1	—

Source: RSSSF.org
Legend: Blue = home team win; Yellow = draw; Red = away team win.

== See also ==
- 2002–03 Macedonian Football Cup
- 2002–03 Macedonian First Football League
