= Pavel Nedelkovski =

Macedonian footballer

Personal information
- Full name: Pavel Nedelkovski; Пaвeл Heдeлкoвcки
- Date of birth: 14 October 1976 (age 50)
- Place of birth: Skopje, SR Macedonia, SFR Yugoslavia
- Height: 1.83 m (6 ft 0 in)
- Position: Midfielder

Senior career*
Years	Team	Apps	(Gls)
1996–1997	Vardar		
1997–2005	Rabotnički	108+	(14+)
2003	→ Radnički Niš		
2004	→ Belasica		
2004–2005	→ Cementarnica	10	(0)
2005–2006	Metalurg Skopje		

International career
1997	FYR Macedonia U-21		

Managerial career
- 2011: Rabotnički
- * Club domestic league appearances and goals

Pavel Nedelkovski (Macedonian: Пaвeл Heдeлкoвcки; born 14 October 1976 in Skopje) is a Macedonian football manager and retired player.

== Playing career ==
During his career he played for FK Vardar, FK Radnički Niš, FK Rabotnički, FK Belasica and FK Cementarnica 55.

At international level, he played for the Macedonia national under-21 football team.

== Managerial career ==
Nedelkovski briefly took charge as main coach of FK Rabotnički in October 2011, becoming right afterwards assistant manager until 2014.

== External sources ==
- Profile at Srbijafudbal. (in Serbian)
- Rabotnički 2000–01 squad at EUFO.de
