= Dragan Ivanov =

Dragan Ivanov may refer to:

- Dragán Ivanov (born 1942), Hungarian athlete
- Dragan Ivanov (footballer) (born 1972), Macedonian footballer
