= Mensur Nexhipi =

Association football player

Personal information
- Date of birth: 15 August 1959 (age 67)
- Place of birth: Skopje, FPR Yugoslavia
- Position: Forward

Youth career
- Vardar

Senior career*
Years	Team	Apps	(Gls)
1978–1980	Vardar	30	(2)
1980–1983	Trepça	74	(13)
1983–1990	Prishtina	159	(28)
1990–1991	Zeytinburnuspor	4	(0)
1991	Prishtina		

Managerial career
- 2004–2005: Bashkimi
- 2008–2009: Slloga Jugomagnat
- 2018–2019: Korabi Dibër
- * Club domestic league appearances and goals

Mensur Nexhipi (Macedonian: Mensur Nedzipi; born 15 August 1959) is a Macedonian football manager and former striker of Albanian descent.

== Personal life ==
He is the father of former Macedonian footballer Nderim Nexhipi.

== Honours ==
Vardar

- Macedonian Football Cup: 1979–80

Prishtina

- Yugoslav Second League: 1982–83
