= 1993–94 Macedonian Football Cup =

Tournament details
- Country: Macedonia
- Teams: 32

Final positions
- Champions: Sileks (1st title)
- Runners-up: Pelister

The 1993–94 Macedonian Football Cup was the 2nd season of Macedonia's football knockout competition. Vardar were the defending champions, having won their first title. The 1993–94 champions were Sileks who won their second title.

== Competition calendar ==
Round	Date(s)	Fixtures	Clubs	New entries
First Round		16	32 → 16	32
Second Round	? & 5 December 1993	16	16 → 8	none
Quarter-finals	27 February & 30 March 1994	8	8 → 4	none
Semi-finals	?, 27 April & 4 May 1994	4	4 → 2	none
Final	25 May 1994	1	2 → 1	none

== First round ==
Team 1	Score	Team 2
Vardar (1)	6–1	Belasica (1)

== Second round ==
Team 1	Agg.	Team 2	1st leg	2nd leg
Vardar (1)	7–0	Makedonija G.P. (2)	5–0	2–0

== Quarter-finals ==
Team 1	Agg.	Team 2	1st leg	2nd leg
Vardar (1)	4–4 (5–3 p)	Ljuboten (1)	3–1	1–3
Sileks (1)	4–1	Karaorman (1)	?	?
Ohrid (2)	5–0	Pobeda Valandovo (2)	?	?
Pelister (1)	4–3	Pobeda (1)	?	?

== Semi-finals ==
Team 1	Agg.	Team 2	1st leg	2nd leg
Ohrid (2)	2–7	Pelister (1)	0–4	2–3
Sileks (1)	2–1	Vardar (1)	1–0	1–1

== Final ==
25 May 1994
20:15 CEST

Sileks (1)	1–1 (a.e.t.)	Pelister (1)
Aleksandrovski 44'	Report	Nikolov 24' (o.g.)
Penalties
Aleksandrovski (penalty scored); Borov (penalty scored); Nikolov (penalty scored); Zefik (penalty missed)	3–1	(penalty scored) Vasilevski; (penalty missed) T. Micevski; (penalty missed) Kapinkovski; (penalty missed) V. Micevski

Gradski stadion, Skopje
Attendance: 10,000
Referee: Vancho Kostenechev (Skopje)

== See also ==
- 1993–94 Macedonian First Football League
- 1993–94 Macedonian Second Football League
