= 2003–04 Macedonian First Football League =

Macedonian First League
- Season: 2003–04
- Dates: 8 August 2003 – 30 May 2004
- Champions: Pobeda; 1st domestic title
- Relegated: Tikvesh; Bregalnica Delchevo
- Champions League: Pobeda
- UEFA Cup: Sileks; Sloga Jugomagnat
- Intertoto Cup: Vardar
- Matches played: 198
- Goals scored: 607 (3.07 per match)
- Top goalscorer: Dragan Dimitrovski (25 goals)
- Biggest home win: Sloga J. 12–1 Bregalnica (D) (19 October 2003)
- Biggest away win: Bregalnica (D) 0–9 Sileks (18 April 2004)
- Highest scoring: Sloga J. 12–1 Bregalnica (D) (19 October 2003)

The 2003–04 Macedonian First League was the 12th season of the Macedonian First Football League, the highest football league of Macedonia. The first matches of the season were played on 8 August 2003 and the last on 30 May 2004. Vardar were the defending champions, having won their fifth title. The 2003-04 champions were Pobeda who had won their first title.

== Promotion and relegation ==
At the start of the 2003–04 season

Promoted from 2002–03 Second League

- Bashkimi (winners)
- Madjari Solidarnost (runners-up)

Relegated to 2003–04 Second League

- Pelister (11th)
- Kumanovo (12th)

At the end of the 2003–04 season

Promoted from 2003–04 Second League

- Bregalnica Shtip (winners)
- Shkëndija (runners-up)

Relegated to 2004–05 Second League

- Tikvesh (11th)
- Bregalnica Delchevo (12th)

== Participating teams ==
Location of teams in 2003–04 Macedonian First League

Club	City	Stadium
Bashkimi	Kumanovo	Gradski stadion Kumanovo
Belasica	Strumica	Stadion Mladost
Bregalnica	Delchevo	Gradski stadion Goce Delchev
Cementarnica 55	Skopje	Stadion Cementarnica
Madjari Solidarnost	Skopje	Stadion Madjari
Napredok	Kichevo	Gradski stadion Kichevo
Pobeda	Prilep	Stadion Goce Delchev
Rabotnichki Kometal	Skopje	Gradski stadion Skopje
Sileks	Kratovo	Stadion Sileks
Sloga Jugomagnat	Skopje	Chair Stadium
Tikvesh	Kavadarci	Gradski stadion Kavadarci
Vardar	Skopje	Gradski stadion Skopje

== League table ==
Pos	Team	Pld	W	D	L	GF	GA	GD	Pts	Qualification or relegation
1	Pobeda (C)	33	22	5	6	78	42	+36	71	Qualification for the Champions League first qualifying round
2	Sileks	33	20	6	7	67	32	+35	66	Qualification for the UEFA Cup first qualifying round
3	Vardar	33	17	9	7	66	39	+27	60	Qualification for the Intertoto Cup first round
4	Rabotnichki Kometal	33	16	10	7	58	40	+18	58	
5	Sloga Jugomagnat	33	17	6	10	69	36	+33	57	Qualification for the UEFA Cup first qualifying round (Note: Sloga Jugomagnat qualified for the UEFA Cup first qualifying round by winning the 2003–04 Macedonian Football Cup.)
6	Madjari Solidarnost	33	14	8	11	44	30	+14	50	
7	Cementarnica 55	33	11	12	10	48	41	+7	45	
8	Bashkimi	33	14	1	18	44	54	−10	43	
9	Napredok	33	12	5	16	51	52	−1	41	
10	Belasica	33	10	6	17	37	55	−18	36	
11	Tikvesh (R)	33	5	4	24	25	62	−37	19	Relegation to the Macedonian Second League
12	Bregalnica Delchevo (Note: Bregalnica Delchevo were deducted three points for not showing up for the match against Napredok in the 8th round.) (R)	33	2	4	27	20	124	−104	7	Relegation to the Macedonian Second League

Source: MacedonianFootball.com, RSSSF.org
Rules for classification: 1) Points; 2) Goal difference; 3) Goals scored; 4) Head-to-head points; 5) Head-to-head goal difference; 6) Head-to-head away goals scored (only if two teams); 7) Head-to-head goals scored; 8) Draw; 9) Play-off. (Note: Criteria 2, 3 and 8 is only used if not deciding Champion, teams for UEFA competitions or relegation).
(C) Champions; (R) Relegated

== Results ==
Every team will play three times against each other team for a total of 33 matches. The first 22 matchdays will consist of a regular double round-robin schedule. The league standings at this point will then be used to determine the games for the last 11 matchdays.

Home \ Away	BAS	BEL	BRD	CEM	MAS	NAP	POB	RAB	SIL	SLO	TIK	VAR	BAS	BEL	BRD	CEM	MAS	NAP	POB	RAB	SIL	SLO	TIK	VAR
Bashkimi	—	1–0	3–3	1–0	1–0	1–2	3–5	1–0	2–1	2–1	4–1	0–3	—	2–0	3–0	—	—	—	1–2	—	0–2	—	—	3–2
Belasica	2–0	—	0–0	4–4	2–0	1–0	3–1	3–5	4–0	1–1	0–0	2–1	—	—	—	4–1	—	0–1	—	0–2	—	1–3	2–0	—
Bregalnica Delchevo	1–3	0–0	—	0–1	0–5	0–3 (Note: Match awarded because Bregalnica Delchevo was not walked on the pitch because the unpaid salaries for their players.)	0–3	0–3	0–5	1–4	2–0	1–3	—	0–2	—	—	—	—	1–5	—	0–9	—	1–0	1–7
Cementarnica 55	4–0	2–1	5–1	—	2–0	0–0	2–0	2–2	0–1	1–0	1–1	2–1	1–2	—	4–1	—	0–0	0–0	—	3–3	—	1–1	—	—
Madjari Solidarnost	3–1	1–0	1–0	1–2	—	2–1	1–0	0–0	1–2	1–1	3–0	0–1	1–0	3–0	6–0	—	—	0–1	—	—	—	—	4–1	—
Napredok	3–2	2–2	4–1	2–0	1–1	—	1–6	0–1	0–1	1–3	4–1	1–1	1–0	—	7–1	—	—	—	3–4	—	1–2	—	—	2–3
Pobeda	2–1	2–0	8–1	1–0	1–1	2–1	—	3–3	1–0	0–0	2–1	5–2	—	3–0	—	4–3	2–1	—	—	4–1	—	2–0	3–2	—
Rabotnichki	2–1	3–0	0–0	1–1	0–0	3–4	2–1	—	2–0	4–0	1–0	1–1	2–0	—	3–1	—	2–3	1–0	—	—	—	1–0	—	2–2
Sileks	2–0	2–0	2–1	0–0	3–0	2–1	1–2	4–3	—	2–2	4–0	1–1	—	4–0	—	3–1	2–0	—	0–0	1–1	—	—	3–1	—
Sloga Jugomagnat	2–1	3–0	12–1	2–0	1–2	1–0	2–1	2–0	4–1	—	3–1	1–1	1–2	—	6–0	—	1–3	3–0	—	—	2–3	—	—	2–0
Tikvesh	3–0	0–1	5–0	1–0	0–0	0–1	1–2	0–1	0–0	0–3	—	1–0	0–2	—	—	0–2	—	3–2	—	0–3	—	1–2	—	—
Vardar	2–1	1–0	2–1	0–0	0–0	4–1	1–1	0–0	0–3	1–0	3–1	—	—	7–2	—	3–3	2–0	—	3–0	—	2–1	—	3–0	—

Source: RSSSF.org
Legend: Blue = home team win; Yellow = draw; Red = away team win.

== Top goalscorers ==
Rank	Player	Club	Goals
1	(North Macedonia) Dragan Dimitrovski	Pobeda	25
2	(North Macedonia) Ivica Gligorovski	Sileks	18
2	(North Macedonia) Stevica Ristić	Sileks	18
4	(Brazil) Wandeir	Vardar	17
5	(North Macedonia) Ljubiša Savić	Sloga Jugomagnat	15
6	(North Macedonia) Nikolche Zdravevski	Pobeda	14
7	(North Macedonia) Blazhe Ilijoski	Rabotnichki	13
8	(North Macedonia) Sasho Krstev	Pobeda	11
8	(North Macedonia) Aleksandar Toleski	Cementarnica	11

Source: rsssf.org

== See also ==
- 2003–04 Macedonian Football Cup
- 2003–04 Macedonian Second Football League
