= Buran Beadini =

Turkish footballer

Personal information
- Full name: Burhanettin Beadini
- Date of birth: 30 March 1955 (age 71)
- Place of birth: Tetovo, FPR Yugoslavia
- Position: Defender

Senior career*
Years	Team	Apps	(Gls)
1975–1977	Teteks	22	(4)
1977–1979	Priština	9	(0)
1980–1981	Teteks	29	(7)
1982–1987	Eskişehirspor	111	(27)
1987–1991	Samsunspor	64	(4)
Total		235	(42)

Managerial career
- 1999: Eskişehirspor
- 1999–2000: Eskişehirspor
- 2001: Eskişehirspor
- 2003-2004: Shkëndija
- 2005: Bashkimi
- 2007–2008: Odunpazarispor
- * Club domestic league appearances and goals

Buran Beadini (born 30 March 1955) is a Macedonian football manager and former defender who played for clubs in Yugoslavia and Turkey. He is of Albanian heritage.

== Playing career ==
=== Club ===
Born in Tetovo, Beadini began playing football for local side FK Teteks. He helped Teteks gain promotion to the Yugoslav First League during his four seasons with the club. He also played one season with FC Prishtina in Yugoslav Second League in 1977–78.

Beadini joined Turkish Süper Lig side Eskişehirspor in January 1982. Five seasons later, he moved to rivals Samsunspor for four seasons.

== Managerial career ==
After retiring from playing football, Beadini became a coach. He was the manager of FK Bashkimi during the 2005–06 season, leading them through their first appearance in European club competitions. He also managed Odunpazarispor during the 2007–08 season.
