= 1994–95 Macedonian Football Cup =

Tournament details
- Country: Macedonia
- Dates: 21 September 1994 – 25 May 1995
- Teams: 32

Final positions
- Champions: Vardar (2nd title)
- Runners-up: Sileks

The 1994–95 Macedonian Football Cup was the 3rd season of Macedonia's football knockout competition. Sileks were the defending champions, having won their second title. The 1994–95 champions were Vardar who won their second title.

== Competition calendar ==
Round	Date(s)	Fixtures	Clubs	New entries
First Round	21 September 1994	16	32 → 16	32
Second Round	30 November & 11 December 1994	16	16 → 8	none
Quarter-finals	26 February & 15 March 1995	8	8 → 4	none
Semi-finals	5, 19 April 1995	4	4 → 2	none
Final	25 May 1995	1	2 → 1	none

== First round ==
Team 1	Score	Team 2
Vardar (1)	1–1 (5–4 p)	Ljuboten (1)
Pobeda (1)	0–0 (2–4 p)	Shkëndija Arachinovo (2)

== Second round ==
Team 1	Agg.	Team 2	1st leg	2nd leg
Varosh (2)	2–10	Vardar (1)	0–3	2–7

== Quarter-finals ==
Team 1	Agg.	Team 2	1st leg	2nd leg
Vardar (1)	18–1	Bashkimi (2)	15–0	3–1

== Semi-finals ==
Team 1	Agg.	Team 2	1st leg	2nd leg
Vardar (1)	4–0	Gostivar (2)	2–0	2–0
Sileks (1)	beat	unknown	?	?

== Final ==
25 May 1995
19:30 CEST

Vardar (1)	2–1	Sileks (1)
Petreski 53', 74'	Report	Zaharievski 55'

Gradski stadion, Skopje
Attendance: 9,000
Referee: Krste Danilovski (Skopje)

== See also ==
- 1994–95 Macedonian First Football League
- 1994–95 Macedonian Second Football League
