= Edis Buturović =

Bosnian footballer (born 2003)

Personal information
- Date of birth: 2 March 2003 (age 23)
- Place of birth: Mostar, Bosnia and Herzegovina
- Height: 1.78 m (5 ft 10 in)
- Position: Defender

Team information
- Current team: Sileks
- Number: 44

Youth career
- –2021: Velež Mostar
- 2021–2022: Sloboda Tuzla

Senior career*
Years	Team	Apps	(Gls)
2022–2023	Radnik Hadžići	27	(0)
2023–2025	Igman Konjic	37	(1)
2025–	Sileks	30	(4)

International career^{‡}
2021–2022	Bosnia and Herzegovina U19	4	(0)
- * Club domestic league appearances and goals as of 18 June 2026 ‡ National team caps and goals as of 3 February 2022

Edis Buturović (born 2 March 2003) is a Bosnian professional footballer who plays as a defender for Sileks.

== Club career ==
=== Igman Konjic ===
Buturović signed a professional contract with club Igman Konjic in July 2023. On 12 August 2023, he made his debut in a league match against Sloga Meridian.

== Career statistics ==
=== Club ===
As of match played 1 October 2023

Appearances and goals by club, season and competition
Club	Season	League			National cup		Europe		Total	
Club	Season	League	Apps	Goals	Apps	Goals	Apps	Goals	Apps	Goals
Radnik Hadžići	2022–23	First League of FBiH	27	0	0	0	—		27	0
Igman Konjic	2023–24	Bosnian Premier League	6	0	1	0	–		7	0
Career total			33	0	1	0	0	0	34	0
