= Dragi Kanatlarovski =

Macedonian footballer and manager

Personal information
- Full name: Dragi Kanatlarovski
- Date of birth: 8 November 1960 (age 65)
- Place of birth: Bitola, PR Macedonia, FPR Yugoslavia
- Height: 1.82 m (5 ft 11 1/2 in)
- Position: Midfielder

Senior career*
Years	Team	Apps	(Gls)
1978–1985	Pelister	98	(10)
1985–1989	Vardar	88	(11)
1989–1990	Red Star Belgrade	29	(1)
1990–1992	Deportivo La Coruña	56	(1)
1992–1993	Pelister	12	(0)
1993–1994	Karşıyaka	13	(0)
1994–1995	Pobeda		
Total		296	(23)

International career
1990	Yugoslavia	1	(0)
1993–1995	Macedonia	9	(2)

Managerial career
- 1995–1996: Pobeda
- 1996: Belasica
- 1997: Vardar
- 1999–2000: Pobeda
- 1999–2001: Macedonia
- 2001–2002: Belasica
- 2002: Kumanovo
- 2003–2004: Pobeda
- 2003–2005: Macedonia
- 2005–2007: Vardar
- 2008: Lokomotiv Plovdiv
- 2011: Lokomotiv Plovdiv
- 2013–2014: Spartak Subotica
- 2014: Novi Pazar
- 2015: Velež Mostar
- 2016–2018: Lovćen
- * Club domestic league appearances and goals

Dragi Kanatlarovski (Macedonian: Драги Канатларовски; born 8 November 1960) is a Macedonian football manager and former player. He represented both the Yugoslavia national team and the Macedonia national team.

== Name issue ==
His original name is Dragi and not Dragan as he is often mistaken for. The confusion happens since in North Macedonia Dragi is one of the nicknames for those who are called Dragan, but not in this case. Similar problem has the current goalkeeper of the Macedonia national team, Tome Pačovski who is mistaken for Tomislav.

== Playing career ==
Born in Bitola, SR Macedonia, he played for his hometown club FK Pelister before moving to FK Vardar where he will play four seasons. In 1989, he moved to Red Star Belgrade. He played one season in Belgrade, but it was enough to win the double, the Yugoslav Championship and the Yugoslav Cup. After that season he moved to Spain where he was Segunda División runner-up in summer 1991 and helped Deportivo La Coruña to be promoted back to La Liga where he played in the 1991–92 season, having reached the Spanish Cup semi-finals.

=== International career ===
He earned his only cap for SFR Yugoslavia against Poland, in a friendly held on 28 March 1990. After the dissolution of Yugoslavia he represented Macedonia having played nine matches, scoring twice, between 1993 and 1995. He played in the first ever official match of Macedonia, played on 13 October 1993, against Slovenia.

== International goals ==
Scores and results list Macedonia's goal tally first.

#	Date	Venue	Opponent	Score	Goals	Competition
1.	13 October 1993	Stanko Mlakar Stadium, Kranj, Slovenia	Slovenia	4–1	51'	Friendly
2.	1 June 1994	Philip II Arena, Skopje, Republic of Macedonia	Estonia	2–0	36'	Friendly

== Honours ==
Championship

- Pelister :1982
- Red Star :1990

Cup

- Pelister :1985
- Red Star :1990

== Coaching career ==
He has been the coach of the Republic of Macedonia twice. He first spell ended due to Republic of Macedonia not qualifying for World Cup 2002. He then became coach of FK Belasica but sacked again in June 2002. In September 2002, he was appointed by FK Kumanovo, then FK Pobeda in December. until June 2003 as coach of both national side and the club. He became full-time national team coach in January 2004.

His second spell ended because of poor results in World Cup 2006 qualifying matches, especially losing to Andorra. He was then replaced by Slobodan Santrač.

He became FK Vardar coach in December 2005.

In 2008, he became coach of Lokomotiv Plovdiv.
