= KF Bashkimi (1947–2008) =

- Full name: Klubi Futbollistik Bashkimi Kumanovë
- Founded: 1947
- Dissolved: 2008
- Ground: Gradski stadion Kumanovo
- Capacity: 7,000
- Final season 2007–08: 10th
Home colours	Away colours

KF Bashkimi (Macedonian: ФК Башкими) was a football club, which was played in the town of Kumanovo, North Macedonia. The club was dissolved before the 2008–09 Macedonian First League season, when they folded due to financial reasons.

A successor club which claims rights to Bashkimi's honours and records was established in 2011 under the same name. However, they are not legally considered to be successors to the original Bashkimi and the two clubs' track records and honours are kept separate by the Football Federation of Macedonia.

== History ==
The club was founded in 1947 and represented the Albanian people, living in the city of Kumanovo (the word Bashkimi in Albanian means unity). But for the first time in the club's history in 2002/03 season they debuted in the First Macedonian League. They played in the league for 5 seasons. A few days before the start of the season 2008/09, despite staying in the competition last season, the club has been terminated because of the huge financial difficulties.

The best year in the club's history was the season 2004/05, when he finished sixth place in the Macedonian First League and achieved the greatest success in its history, winning the Macedonian Cup. This allowed them to represent the country in the competition with UEFA Cup. In the first qualifying round eliminated the Bosnia and Herzegovina club NK Žepče, winning the first match by forfeit (because was Žepče fielded ineligible player) and the second leg 1–1 draw away from home. In the second round players of Bashkimi were nevertheless twice as high Israeli club Maccabi Petah Tikva 0–5 and 0–6 and were eliminated from further competition.

== Supporters ==
FK Bashkimi supporters are called Ilirët.

== Honours ==
- Macedonian Second League
  - Winners (1): 2002–03
- Macedonian Football Cup
  - Winners (1): 2004–05

== Seasons ==
Season	League									Cup	European competitions	
Season	Division	P	W	D	L	F	A	Pts	Pos	Cup	European competitions	
1992–93	3. MFL North	?	?	?	?	?	?	?	?			
1993–94	3. MFL North	?	?	?	?	?	?	?	2nd ↑			
1994–95	2. MFL East	30	15	5	12	48	37	44	5th	QF		
1995–96	2. MFL East	30	12	6	12	41	37	42	8th			
1996–97	2. MFL East	30	13	6	11	51	42	45	5th	R2		
1997–98	2. MFL East	29	13	5	11	48	36	44	5th			
1998–99	2. MFL East	29	14	8	7	55	66	50	3rd			
1999–00	2. MFL East	30	18	3	9	79	35	57	3rd	R2		
2000–01	2. MFL	26	20	3	3	61	15	63	12th	QF		
2001–02	2. MFL	34	22	4	8	86	44	70	3rd	PR		
2002–03	2. MFL	36	27	5	4	107	24	86	1st ↑	R1		
2003–04	1. MFL	33	14	1	18	44	54	43	8th	R1		
2004–05	1. MFL	33	14	7	12	53	47	49	6th	W		
2005–06	1. MFL	33	13	6	14	50	49	45	6th	R2	UEFA Cup	QR2
2006–07	1. MFL	33	12	6	15	54	60	42	8th	R2		
2007–08	1. MFL	33	8	6	19	40	63	30	10th	R2		
2008–09	1. MFL	The club have withdrawn from the league							↓	N/A		

== Bashkimi in Europe ==
Season	Competition	Round	Opponent	Home	Away	Aggregate
2005–06	UEFA Cup	QR1	(Bosnia and Herzegovina) NK Žepče	3–0	1–1	4–1
2005–06	UEFA Cup	QR2	(Israel) Maccabi Petah Tikva	0–5	0–6	0–11

== Historical list of coaches ==
- (Republic of Kosova) Luan Prekazi (1993 - 1994)
- (North Macedonia) Nexhat Husein (2002 - 2003)
- (North Macedonia) Mensur Nexhipi (2004 - Feb 2005)
- (North Macedonia) Buran Beadini (27 Feb 2005 - Oct 2005)
- (Albania) Edmond Miha (10 Oct 2005 - Dec 2005)
- (Kosovo) Bylbyl Sokoli (15 Dec 2005 - May 2006)
- (Kosovo) Hysni Maxhuni (Jul 2006 - Apr 2007)
- (North Macedonia) Erkan Jusuf (29 Apr 2007 - Dec 2007)
- (North Macedonia) Nexhat Shabani (16 Dec 2007 - Jun 2008)
