= Mirza Delimeđac =

Serbian-born Bosnian footballer

Personal information
- Date of birth: 24 October 1999 (age 27)
- Place of birth: Novi Pazar, FR Yugoslavia
- Height: 1.79 m (5 ft 10 in)
- Position: Midfielder

Team information
- Current team: Sileks
- Number: 22

Youth career
- Novi Pazar

Senior career*
Years	Team	Apps	(Gls)
2019	Tampines Rovers	0	(0)
2019–2022	Novi Pazar	80	(4)
2022	Septemvri Sofia	7	(0)
2023	Kukësi	15	(1)
2023–2024	Tuzla City	30	(0)
2024	Sloboda Tuzla	11	(0)
2025	Tekstilac Odžaci	4	(0)
2025	Jedinstvo Ub	12	(1)
2026–	Sileks	16	(0)
- * Club domestic league appearances and goals as of 15 June 2026

Mirza Delimeđac (Serbian Cyrillic: Мирза Делимеђац; born 24 October 1999) is a Serbian footballer who plays as a midfielder for Macedonian First Football League club Sileks.

== Club career ==
In 2019, Delimeđac joined Tampines Rovers. He was only registered for the AFC cup during the season and played occasionally in the youth league. Due to the lack of playing time, he returned to his childhood club, FK Novi Pazar. On 6 June 2022 he moved to the Bulgarian First League team of Septemvri Sofia.

On 29 June 2023, Delimeđac signed a contract with Tuzla City.

== Career statistics ==
As of 3 October 2023

Club	Season	League			National Cup		Other		Continental		Total	
Club	Season	Division	Apps	Goals	Apps	Goals	Apps	Goals	Apps	Goals	Apps	Goals
Tampines Rovers	2019	Singapore Premier League	0	0	0	0	0	0	5 (Note: Appearances in the AFC Cup)	1	5	1
Tampines Rovers	Total		0	0	0	0	0	0	5	1	5	1
Novi Pazar	2019–20	Serbian First League	25	2	1	0	—		—		25	2
Novi Pazar	2020–21	Serbian SuperLiga	30	2	1	0	—		—		31	2
Novi Pazar	2021–22	Serbian SuperLiga	25	0	2	0	1	0	—		28	0
Novi Pazar	Total		80	4	4 (Note: Appearances in the Serbian Cup)	0	1	0	0	0	85	4
Septemvri Sofia	2022–23	Bulgarian First League	7	0	0	0	0	0	—		7	0
Septemvri Sofia	Total		7	0	0	0	0	0	0	0	7	0
Career total			87	4	4	0	1	0	5	1	97	5
