= Edmond Miha =

Albanian football manager

Personal information
- Place of birth: Albania

Senior career*
Years	Team	Apps	(Gls)
- Teuta

Managerial career
- 1992–1993: Teuta
- Albania U21
- 1999: Shkëndija
- 2005: Bashkimi
- 2006–2007: Shkëndija
- 2010: Shkëndija
- 2011: Rinia Gostivar
- 2012–2013: Neusiedl am See 1919
- * Club domestic league appearances and goals

Edmond Miha is an Albanian former football manager and footballer.

== Life and career ==
Miha was born in Albania. In 1992, he was appointed manager of Albanian side Teuta. He helped the club win their first league title. After that, he was appointed manager of the Albania national under-21 football team. He was almost appointed manager of the Albania national football team. In 1999, he was appointed manager of Macedonian side Shkëndija. In 2005, he was appointed manager of Macedonian side Bashkimi.

In 2006, he returned as manager of KF Shkëndija. In 2010, he returned as manager of Shkëndija for the third time. He helped the club win their first league title. After retiring from professional football, he lived in Vienna, Austria. He has established a foreign language school in Austria. He has been married. He has a grandson.
