= 1995–96 Macedonian Football Cup =

Tournament details
- Country: Macedonia
- Dates: 13 August 1995 – 23 May 1996
- Teams: 32

Final positions
- Champions: Sloga Jugomagnat (1st title)
- Runners-up: Vardar

The 1995–96 Macedonian Football Cup was the 4th season of Macedonia's football knockout competition. Vardar were the defending champions, having won their second title. The 1995–96 champions were Sloga Jugomagnat who won their first title.

== Competition calendar ==
Round	Date(s)	Fixtures	Clubs	New entries
First Round	13 August 1995	16	32 → 16	32
Second Round	8 November & 7 December 1995	16	16 → 8	none
Quarter-finals	3, 20 March 1996	8	8 → 4	none
Semi-finals	17 April & 1 May 1996	4	4 → 2	none
Final	23 May 1996	1	2 → 1	none

== First round ==
Matches were played on 13 August 1995.

Team 1	Score	Team 2
Vardar (1)	13–0	Pobeda Valandovo (3)
Sloga Jugomagnat (1)	2–0	Kumanovo (2)

== Second round ==
The first legs were played on 8 November and second were played on 7 December 1995.

Team 1	Agg.	Team 2	1st leg	2nd leg
Vardar (1)	9–3	Balkan (1)	3–1	6–2
Sloga Jugomagnat (1)	(a) 1–1	Sileks (1)	0–0	1–1

== Quarter-finals ==
The first legs were played on 3 March and second were played on 20 March 1996.

Team 1	Agg.	Team 2	1st leg	2nd leg
Makedonija G.P. (2)	1–4	Vardar (1)	0–1	1–3
Ljuboten (1)	?	Shkëndija Arachinovo (2)	?	?
Pelister (1)	?	FCU 55 (1)	?	?
Bregalnica Shtip (1)	2–4	Sloga Jugomagnat (1)	1–1	1–3

== Semi-finals ==
The first legs were played on 17 April and the second were played on 1 May 1996.

Team 1	Agg.	Team 2	1st leg	2nd leg
Vardar (1)	4–1	Pelister (1)	3–0	1–1
Shkëndija Arachinovo (2)	2–4	Sloga Jugomagnat (1)	1–2	1–2

== Final ==
23 May 1996
18:30 CEST

Sloga Jugomagnat (1)	0–0 (a.e.t.)	Vardar (1)
	Report
Penalties
Beqiri (penalty scored); Demjanski (penalty scored); Tuna (penalty scored); Tasev (penalty scored); Memedi (penalty scored)	5–3	(penalty scored) Markovski; (penalty missed) Karadjov; (penalty scored) Trajchov; (penalty scored) Nikolovski

Gradski stadion, Skopje
Attendance: 18,000
Referee: Gjoko Stojanovski (Skopje)

== See also ==
- 1995–96 Macedonian First Football League
- 1995–96 Macedonian Second Football League
