= Madžari, North Macedonia =

Madžari Маџари
- Neighbourhood
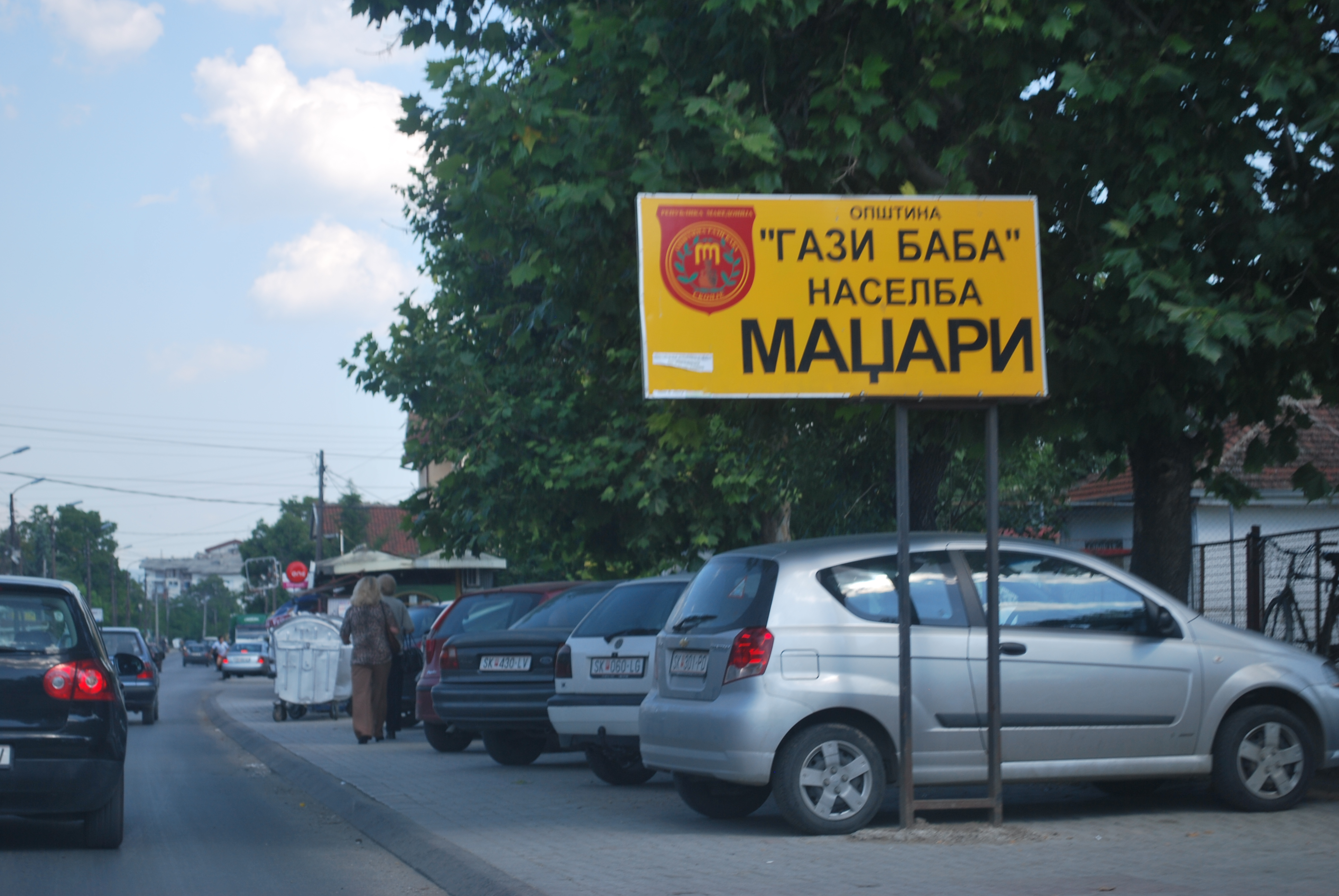

- Location in Gazi Baba Municipality

- Location within Republic of North Macedonia
- Coordinates: 42°00′N 21°30′E
- Country: North Macedonia
- Region: Skopje
- Municipality: Gazi Baba
- Time zone: UTC+1 (CET)
  - Summer (DST): UTC+2 (CEST)
- Car plates: SK

Madžari (Macedonian: Маџари) is a neighbourhood in the City of Skopje, North Macedonia, administered by the Gazi Baba Municipality.

== Demographics ==
According to the 2002 census, the town had a total of 12874 inhabitants. Ethnic groups in the town include:

Year	Macedonian	Albanian	Turks	Romani	Vlachs	Serbs	Bosniaks	Others	Total
2002	11.245	199	111	477	62	440	169	171	12.874
2021	Part of Gazi Baba Neighbourhood								

== Sports ==
The local football club FK Madžari Solidarnost has played in the Macedonian First Football League.
