= 1997–98 Macedonian Football Cup =

Tournament details
- Country: Macedonia
- Dates: 3 August 1997 – 24 May 1998
- Teams: 32

Final positions
- Champions: Vardar (3rd title)
- Runners-up: Sloga Jugomagnat

The 1997–98 Macedonian Football Cup was the 6th season of Macedonia's football knockout competition. Sileks were the defending champions, having won their second title. The 1997–98 champions were Vardar who won their third title.

== Competition calendar ==
Round	Date(s)	Fixtures	Clubs	New entries
First Round	3 August 1997	16	32 → 16	32
Group stage	10 September, 15, 29 October, 5, 19 November 1997 & 21 February 1998	48	16 → 8	none
Quarter-finals	4, 11 March 1998	8	8 → 4	none
Semi-finals	1 April 1998 & ?	4	4 → 2	none
Final	24 May 1998	1	2 → 1	none

== First round ==
Team 1	Score	Team 2
Vardar	2–0	Ohrid
Belasica	2–1	Turnovo

== Group stage ==
The most results are unknown.

=== Group 3 ===
Makedonija G.P. and Vardar were advanced to the quarterfinal, the other teams in group were Bregalnica Delchevo and Tikvesh.

== Quarter-finals ==
Team 1	Agg.	Team 2	1st leg	2nd leg
Skopje	2–1	Makedonija G.P.	1–1	1–0
Belasica	2–5	Vardar	2–2	0–3
Borec	1–3	Sileks	0–2	1–1
Balkan	0–2	Sloga Jugomagnat	0–0	0–2

== Semi-finals ==
Team 1	Agg.	Team 2	1st leg	2nd leg
Sloga Jugomagnat	3–1	Sileks	1–1	2–0
Skopje	0–5	Vardar	0–4	0–1

== Final ==
24 May 1998
17:00 CEST

Sloga Jugomagnat	0–2	Vardar
	Report	Krstev 74'; Zdravevski 82'

Gradski stadion, Skopje
Attendance: 16,000
Referee: Sasho Lazarevski (Kumanovo)

== See also ==
- 1997–98 Macedonian First Football League
- 1997–98 Macedonian Second Football League
