= Dragan Ivanov (footballer) =

Macedonian footballer

Personal information
- Date of birth: 18 November 1972 (age 53)
- Position: Midfielder

Senior career*
Years	Team	Apps	(Gls)
–1999	FK Makedonija Gjorče Petrov		
1999–2000	FK Sileks		
2000–2001	FK Rabotnički		
2001–2002	NK Zadar		
2002–2006	FK Bregalnica Štip		
- * Club domestic league appearances and goals

Dragan Ivanov (born 16 November 1972) is a retired Macedonian football midfielder.
