= FK Sileks =

Sileks
- Full name: Fudbalski klub Sileks Kratovo; Фудбалски клуб Силекс Кратово
- Nickname: Кратери (Kratovo Boys)
- Founded: 1965; 61 years ago
- Ground: Sileks Stadium
- Capacity: 1,800
- Chairman: Dragan Ivanov
- Manager: Aleksandar Vasoski
- League: Macedonian First League
- 2025–26: Macedonian First League, 4th
- Website: fksileks.mk
Home colours	Away colours

FK Sileks (Macedonian: ФК Силекс) is a professional football club based in Kratovo, North Macedonia, currently playing in the Macedonian First League.

== History ==
FK Sileks was founded in 1965, during the Yugoslav period, and initially competed in the regional leagues. The club was named after the nearby Sileks lead and zinc mine, which played a significant role in the local economy and provided financial backing for the team. Despite being a small club, Sileks gradually built a reputation for itself within the regional competitions.

The club's first major breakthrough came in the early 1990s, after Macedonia declared its independence from Yugoslavia. In 1992, the Macedonian First Football League was established, and FK Sileks became one of the founding members. Under the guidance of Ljubislav Ivanov "Singo," a key figure in the club's history, Sileks quickly rose to prominence.

During the 1990s, FK Sileks established itself as one of the strongest teams in the Macedonian league. The club won its first Macedonian First League title in the 1995-96 season and successfully defended the title in the following two seasons, achieving a historic "three-peat" by winning the league in 1996-97 and 1997-98. This period of dominance cemented FK Sileks as one of the top teams in the country.

FK Sileks' success wasn't limited to the league. The club also enjoyed considerable success in the Macedonian Football Cup, winning the competition three times—in 1994, 1997, and 2021. The 1994 Cup victory was particularly notable, as it was the first time the club won a major domestic trophy. Their cup victory in 2021 came in spite of relegation from the Macedonian First Football League.

In addition to its three league titles and three cup victories, FK Sileks also won the Macedonian Super Cup in 1997, further solidifying its status as one of the country's top football clubs during the 1990s and early 2000s.

== Stadium ==
City Stadium Sileks (Macedonian: Градски стадион Силекс-Кратово) is a multi-purpose stadium in Kratovo, Macedonia. It is currently used mostly for football matches and is the home stadium of FK Sileks. The stadium holds 1,800 seats.

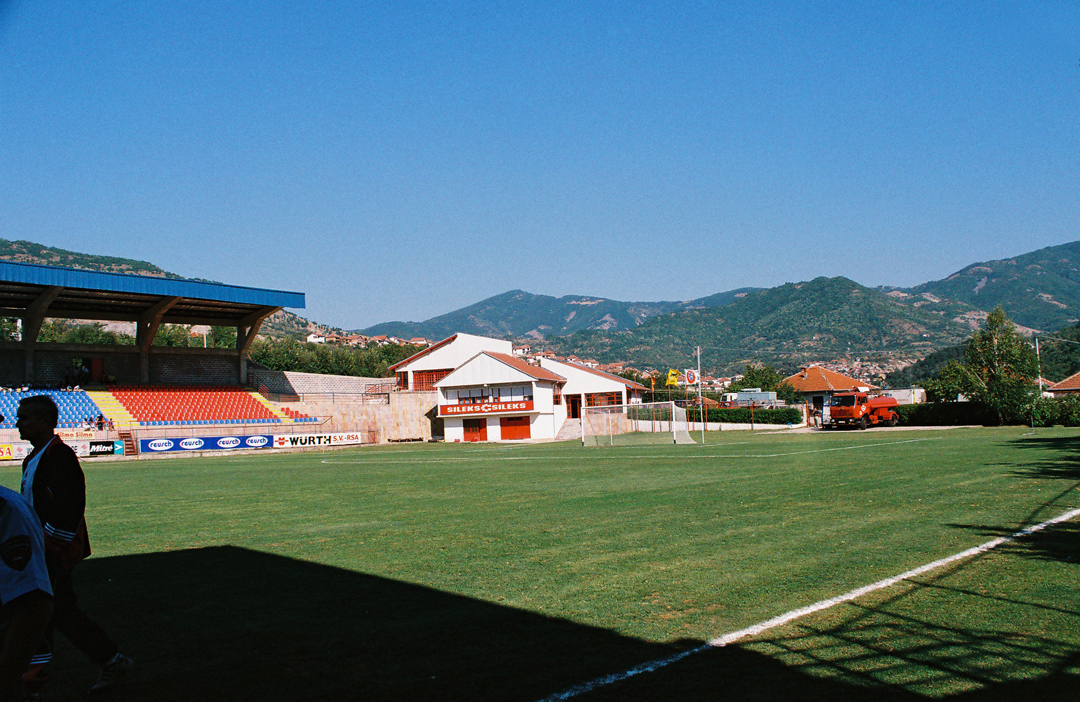
City Ground Kratovo

== Honours ==
- (North Macedonia) Macedonian First League
  - Winners (3): 1995–96, 1996–97 and 1997–98
  - Runners-up (6): 1992–93, 1993–94, 1994–95, 1998–99, 2003–04, 2019–20 and 2024–25
- (North Macedonia) Macedonian Second League
  - Winners (2): 2013–14 and 2021–22
- (Socialist Republic of Macedonia) Macedonian Republic Cup
  - Winners (2): 1988–89 and 1989–90
- (North Macedonia) Macedonian Football Cup
  - Winners (4): 1993–94, 1996–97, 2020–21 and 2025–26
  - Runners-up (2): 1994–95 and 2021–22

== Recent seasons ==
Season	League									Cup	European competitions	
Season	Division	P	W	D	L	F	A	Pts	Pos	Cup	European competitions	
1992–93	1. MFL	34	17	6	11	72	50	40	2nd			
1993–94	1. MFL	30	18	8	4	56	19	44	2nd	W		
1994–95	1. MFL	30	18	6	6	66	28	60	2nd	RU		
1995–96	1. MFL	28	21	7	0	74	20	70	1st	R2	Cup Winners' Cup	R1
1996–97	1. MFL	26	19	5	2	83	23	62	1st	W	UEFA Cup	PR
1997–98	1. MFL	25	15	3	7	40	21	48	1st	SF	Champions League	QR1
1998–99	1. MFL	26	17	6	3	66	22	57	2nd	SF	Champions League	QR1
1999–00	1. MFL	26	11	7	8	43	29	40	6th	QF		
2000–01	1. MFL	26	14	1	11	52	40	43	5th	R2		
2001–02	1. MFL	20	11	2	7	48	35	35	7th	QF		
2002–03	1. MFL	33	14	4	15	40	35	46	6th	SF		
2003–04	1. MFL	33	20	6	7	67	32	66	2nd	R1		
2004–05	1. MFL	33	15	5	12	56	37	51	4th	SF	UEFA Cup	QR1
2005–06	1. MFL	33	10	11	12	54	58	41	9th	SF	Intertoto Cup	R1
2006–07	1. MFL	33	12	5	16	54	50	41	9th	R1		
2007–08	1. MFL	33	10	11	12	33	36	41	9th	R2		
2008–09	1. MFL	30	9	9	12	38	41	36	7th	QF		
2009–10	1. MFL	26	8	8	10	29	33	32	5th	R2		
2010–11	1. MFL	33	13	8	12	39	38	47	5th	R2		
2011–12	1. MFL	33	13	3	17	42	51	42	6th	R2		
2012–13	1. MFL	33	6	5	22	33	61	23	12th ↓	SF		
2013–14	2. MFL	29	20	4	5	66	24	64	1st ↑	R2		
2014–15	1. MFL	32	10	11	11	33	42	41	5th	R2		
2015–16	1. MFL	32	12	8	12	35	40	44	3rd	QF		
2016–17	1. MFL	36	11	14	11	41	43	47	6th	QF	Europa League	QR1
2017–18	1. MFL	36	13	11	12	30	37	50	5th	R2		
2018–19	1. MFL	36	11	11	14	27	39	44	8th	QF		
2019–20^{1}	1. MFL	23	10	6	7	24	21	36	2nd	N/A		
2020–21	1. MFL	33	10	6	17	36	45	36	9th ↓	W	Champions League; Europa League	QR1; QR1
2021–22	2. MFL West	27	20	6	1	55	9	66	1st ↑	RU	Conference League	QR1
2022–23	1. MFL	30	13	9	8	41	34	48	4th	SF		
2023–24	1. MFL	33	10	13	10	36	40	43	5th	QF		
2024–25	1. MFL	33	19	10	4	57	19	67	2nd	QF		
2025–26	1. MFL	33	16	5	12	59	35	53	4th	W		

^{1}The 2019–20 season was abandoned due to the COVID-19 pandemic in North Macedonia.

== Supporters ==
The supporters of Fk Sileks are known as krateri and they were founded in 1997

== Rivalries ==
The rivalries of FK Sileks Kratovo with these clubs stem from various historical, regional, and competitive factors:

1. FK Vardar: As it is considered one of the most prominent and widely supported clubs in Macedonia, Vardar's success and prominence make them a natural rival for many clubs, and has contributed to a competitive relationship with FK Sileks. Matches between these teams are typically regarded as highly competitive due to the disparity in their histories and achievements.

2. FK Pelister:Bitola ed in the same region, Pelister and Sileks have a regional rivalry that fuels their matches. Local derbies often bring out heightened emotions and competitiveness.

3. FK Pobeda: Similar to Pelister, Pobeda’s proximity and historical competition with Sileks create a strong rivalry, with both teams striving to assert their dominance in the region.

4. FK Bregalnica Stip : The rivalry with Bregalnica often reflects the competitive spirit of the Macedonian league and local pride.

5. FK Rudar Probistip : The rivalry between fk sileks an fk rudar is because of how close they are and the derby is called " the Neighborly derby."

These rivalries often involve a mix of historical competition, regional pride, and the quest for dominance in Macedonian football.

== Sileks in Europe ==
=== UEFA club competition record ===
Competition	Played	Win	Draw	Lost	For	Against
UEFA Champions League	5	1	1	3	2	9
UEFA Cup/Europa League	8	2	1	5	6	13
UEFA Europa Conference League	2	0	1	1	1	2
UEFA Cup Winners' Cup	4	1	1	2	6	8
UEFA Intertoto Cup	2	0	0	2	4	6
Total	21	4	4	13	19	38

=== Results ===
Season	Competition	Round	Opponent	Home	Away	Aggregate
1995–96	UEFA Cup Winners' Cup	QR	(Hungary) Vác FC Samsung	3–1	1–1	4–2
1995–96	UEFA Cup Winners' Cup	R1	(Germany) Borussia Mönchengladbach	2–3	0–3	2–6
1996–97	UEFA Cup	PR	(Iceland) ÍA Akranes	1–0	0–2	1–2
1997–98	UEFA Champions League	QR1	(Israel) Beitar Jerusalem	1–0	0–3	1–3
1998–99	UEFA Champions League	QR1	(Belgium) Club Brugge	0–0	1–2	1–2
1999–00	UEFA Cup	QR	(Ukraine) Shakhtar Donetsk	2–1	1–3	3–4
2004–05	UEFA Cup	QR1	(Slovenia) Maribor	0–1	1–1	1–2
2005	UEFA Intertoto Cup	R1	(Israel) Beitar Jerusalem	1–2	3–4	4–6
2016–17	UEFA Europa League	QR1	(Liechtenstein) Vaduz	1–2	1–3	2–5
2020–21	UEFA Champions League	QR1	(Azerbaijan) Qarabağ	—N/a	0–4	—N/a
2020–21	UEFA Europa League	QR2	(Kosovo) Drita	0–2	—N/a	—N/a
2021–22	UEFA Europa Conference League	QR1	(Moldova) Petrocub Hîncești	1–1	0–1	1–2
2025–26	UEFA Conference League	QR1	(Montenegro) Dečić	2–1	0–2	2–3
2026–27	UEFA Conference League	QR1	(Belarus) Dinamo Minsk	0–1	1–0	1–1

== Players ==
=== Current squad ===
As of 1 August 2026

Note: Flags indicate national team as defined under FIFA eligibility rules; some limited exceptions apply. Players may hold more than one non-FIFA nationality.

No.	Pos.	Nation	Player
1	GK	MKD	Daniel Bozhinovski
3	DF	MKD	Mario Richkov
5	DF	MKD	Gjorge Djekov
6	MF	MKD	Darko Angjeleski (captain)
7	DF	MKD	Angelche Timovski (vice-captain)
8	FW	BIH	Nihad Šero
9	FW	BIH	Esmir Hasukić
10	MF	MKD	Matej Gjerasov
11	MF	MKD	Kristijan Velinovski
12	GK	MKD	Kristijan Gjorgjievski
16	MF	MKD	Ilija Donov
18	MF	MKD	Filip Gjorgjievski

No.	Pos.	Nation	Player
19	FW	MKD	Aleksandar Mishov
21	DF	MKD	Luka Georgioski
22	MF	SRB	Mirza Delimeđac
23	DF	MKD	Kristijan Eftimov
25	GK	MKD	Ljupche Djekov
29	DF	SRB	Ivan Šubert
44	DF	BIH	Edis Buturović
71	MF	MKD	Martin Talakov
77	FW	MKD	Nikola Bogdanovski
88	DF	MKD	Borjan Panovski
96	DF	MKD	Darko Ilieski
99	MF	MKD	Nikola Manojlov

=== Out on loan ===
Note: Flags indicate national team as defined under FIFA eligibility rules; some limited exceptions apply. Players may hold more than one non-FIFA nationality.

No.	Pos.	Nation	Player
—	FW	MKD	Marko Nikolovski (at Ohrid until 30 June 2027)

=== Technical staff ===
Head coach	(North Macedonia) Aleksandar Vasoski
Assistant coach	(North Macedonia) Ivica Gligorovski
Assistant coach	(Serbia) Radenko Bojović
Fitness coach	(North Macedonia) Sasho Hristovski
Goalkeeper coach	(North Macedonia) Novica Dinev
Physiotherapist	(North Macedonia) Zoran Jakimovski
Doctor	(North Macedonia) Goce Markovski
Economic	(North Macedonia) Chedomir Nacev

== Historical list of coaches ==
- (North Macedonia) Zoran Smileski (1995 –1998)
- (North Macedonia) Gjoko Hadžievski (1998 –1999)
- (North Macedonia) Lazar Plackov (1999)
- (North Macedonia) Zoran Mitevski (2000)
- (North Macedonia) Momcilo Mitevski (2000 –2001)
- (Federal Republic of Yugoslavia) Nenad Stavrić (2001 –2002)
- (North Macedonia) Momcilo Mitevski (2002 –2003)
- (Serbia and Montenegro) Nebojša Petrović (2003 –Sep 2005)
- (North Macedonia) Kire Trajcev (Sep 2005 –Jan 2006)
- (Slovenia) Josip Pirmajer (10 Jan 2006 –Jun 2006)
- (Serbia) Slavko Jović (Jul 2006 –Feb 2007)
- (North Macedonia) Momcilo Mitevski (4 Mar 2007 –Jun 2007)
- (North Macedonia) Marjan Sekulovski (Jul 2007 –Oct 2008)
- (North Macedonia) Ane Andovski (19 Oct 2008 –Jun 2012)
- (North Macedonia) Ljubodrag Milošević (Jul 2012 –Sep 2012)
- (Serbia) Nebojša Petrović (4 Oct 2012 –Apr 2013)
- (North Macedonia) Trajce Senev (20 Apr 2013 –Jun 2014)
- (North Macedonia) Gordan Zdravkov (Jul 2014 –Dec 2014)
- (North Macedonia) Zoran Shterjovski (Jan 2015 –Jun 2015)
- (North Macedonia) Momchilo Mitevski (Jul 2015 –May 2016)
- (North Macedonia) Gordan Zdravkov (Jun 2016 –Jul 2016)
- (North Macedonia) Zikica Tasevski (25 Oct 2016 –30 Sep 2018)
- (Serbia) Goran Simov (Apr 2019 –)
