= Boris Trajkovski Stadium =

Stadium in North Macedonia

Coordinates: 42.0004°N 21.5029°E

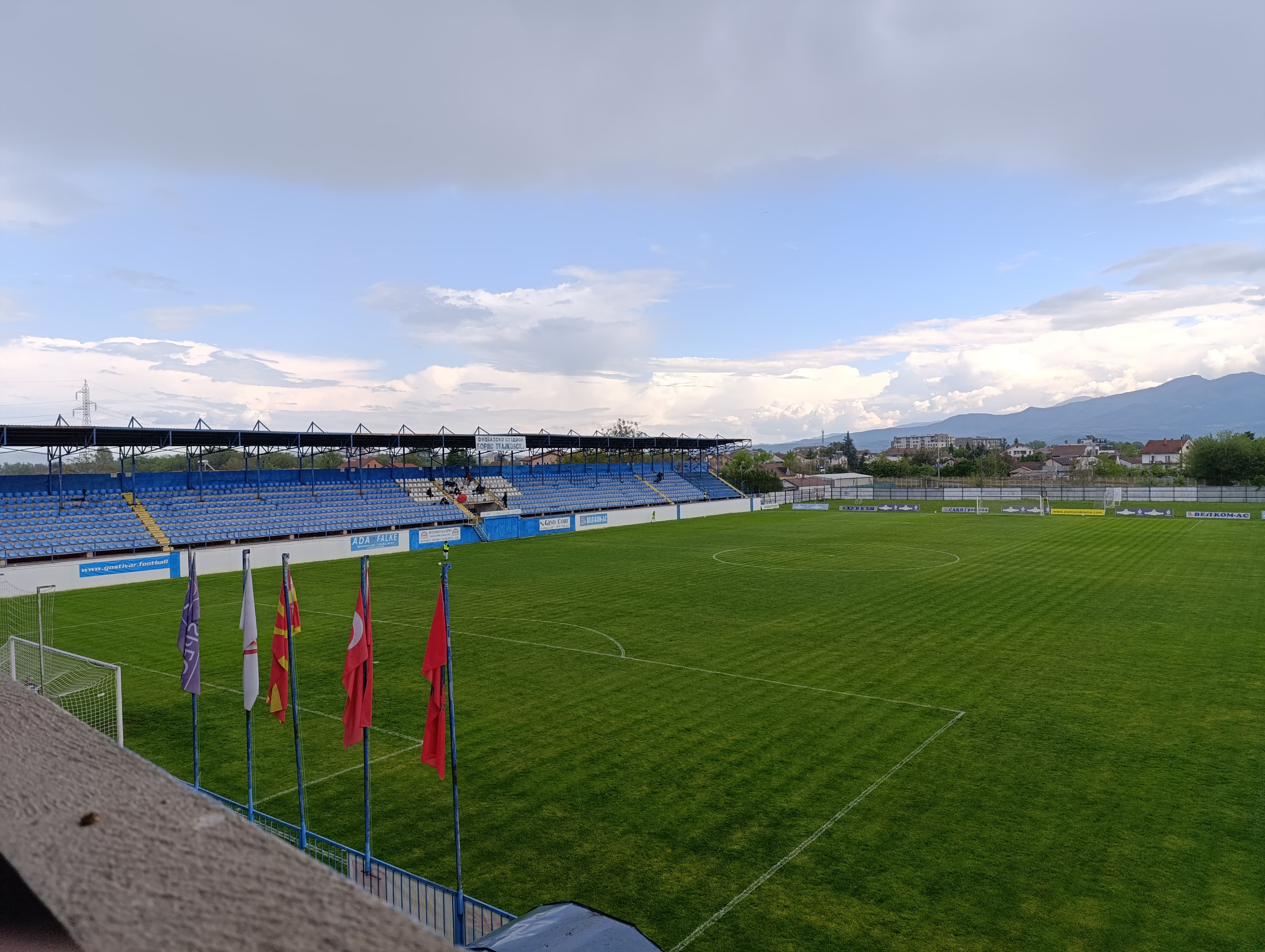
- Interactive map of Boris Trajkovski Stadium
- Location: Metodija Andonov - Chento, 1000; Skopje, North Macedonia
- Owner: Gazi Baba Municipality
- Capacity: 3,000
- Surface: Grass
- Field size: 100 x 65 meters

Construction
- Opened: 1937

Tenants
- Madzari Solidarnost; Vardar; Gostivari (2024-now)

Boris Trajkovski Stadium (Macedonian Cyrillic: Стадион Борис Трајковски) is a football stadium in Skopje, North Macedonia. It is named after former president Boris Trajkovski and is currently the home of Madzari Solidarnost and Vardar for alternate venue used. The stadium seats 3,000 people, including 100 VIP seats and press section of 60.
