= FK Cementarnica 55 =

- Full name: Fudbalski klub Cementarnica 55 Skopje
- Nickname: Цементарци (Concrete Boys)
- Founded: 1955; 71 years ago
- Dissolved: 2020; 6 years ago
- Ground: Cementarnica Stadium
- Capacity: 2,000
Home colours	Away colours

FK Cementarnica 55 (Macedonian: ФК Цементарница 55) was a football club from Skopje, North Macedonia. They most recently competed in the Macedonian Third League (North Division).

== History ==
The club was founded as FK FCU after the name of founder, ex cement factory 'FC Usje' (fabrika za cement Usje) Skopje.

== Honours ==
- Macedonian Second League
  - Runners-up (1): 2006–07
- Macedonian Football Cup
  - Winners (1): 2002–03
  - Runners-up (1): 2001–02

== Recent seasons ==
Season	League									Cup	European competitions	
Season	Division	P	W	D	L	F	A	Pts	Pos	Cup	European competitions	
1992–93	1. MFL	34	13	6	15	37	53	32	13th			
1993–94	1. MFL	30	9	8	13	36	40	26	10th			
1994–95	1. MFL	30	9	6	15	31	40	33	14th			
1995–96	1. MFL	28	9	5	14	36	52	32	11th	QF		
1996–97	1. MFL	26	8	5	13	32	39	29	12th	R1		
1997–98	1. MFL	25	9	3	13	28	32	30	9th			
1998–99	1. MFL	29	14	2	10	47	37	44	5th	QF		
1999–00	1. MFL	26	14	5	7	43	29	47	5th	QF	Intertoto Cup	R2
2000–01	1. MFL	26	11	3	12	38	31	36	7th	QF		
2001–02	1. MFL	20	8	3	9	33	34	27	3rd	RU		
2002–03	1. MFL	33	11	9	13	45	39	42	8th	W	Intertoto Cup	R1
2003–04	1. MFL	33	11	12	10	48	41	45	7th	R2	UEFA Cup	R1
2004–05	1. MFL	33	13	7	13	54	50	43^{(−3)}	9th	R2		
2005–06	1. MFL	33	8	8	17	38	51	32	11th ↓	QF		
2006–07	2. MFL	33	16	11	6	53	24	59	2nd ↑	QF		
2007–08	1. MFL	33	5	9	19	24	46	24	12th ↓	PR		
2008–09	2. MFL	29	8	5	16	25	45	29	8th	R1		
2009–10	2. MFL	26	7	5	14	21	40	26	12th	PR		
2010–11	2. MFL	26	4	10	12	20	41	22	13th ↓	R1		
2011–12	3. MFL North	33	11	5	17	54	64	38	16th ↓	PR		
2012–13	OFL Kisela Voda	?	?	?	?	?	?	?	?	PR		
2013–14	OFL Kisela Voda	?	?	?	?	?	?	?	?	PR		
2014–15	OFL Kisela Voda	?	?	?	?	?	?	?	?	PR		
2015–16	OFL Kisela Voda	?	?	?	?	?	?	?	?	PR		
2016–17	OFL Kisela Voda	10	7	0	3	29	24	21	1st ↑	PR		
2017–18	3. MFL North	24	4	3	17	27	65	12	13th ↓	PR		
2018–19	OFL Kisela Voda	13	12	0	1	53	17	36	1st ↑	PR		
2019–20^{1}	3. MFL North	13	0	2	11	7	48	−1^{(−3)}	16th ↓	PR		

^{1}Cementarnica 55 was excluded from the third league after not appearing at 3 matches.

== Cementarnica in Europe ==
- Q = qualifier
- R1 = first round / R2 = second round

Season	Competition	Round		Club	Score
1999	UEFA Intertoto Cup	R1	(Georgia (country))	FC Kolkheti-1913 Poti	4–2, 4–0
1999	UEFA Intertoto Cup	R2	(Russia)	FC Rostov	1–1, 1–2
2002	UEFA Intertoto Cup	R1	(Iceland)	Fimleikafélag Hafnarfjarðar	1–3, 2–1
2003/04	UEFA Cup	QR	(Poland)	GKS Katowice	0–0, 1–1 (a)
2003/04	UEFA Cup	R1	(France)	RC Lens	0–1, 0–5

== Historical list of coaches ==
- (North Macedonia) Alekso Mackov (1999 - 2000)
- (North Macedonia) Zoran Stratev (2000 - 2003)
- (North Macedonia) Žanko Savov (2003 - 2004)
- (North Macedonia) Zoran Stratev (2004 - 2005)
- (North Macedonia) Žanko Savov (Jun 2005 - 1 Nov 2005)
- (Serbia) Zoran Rosić (1 Nov 2005 - 1 Apr 2006)
- (North Macedonia) Borce Hristov (1 Apr 2006 - )
- (North Macedonia) Dragi Stefanovski (Jun 2007 -)
- (North Macedonia) Saše Reatovski
