= KF Vëllazërimi 77 =

KF Vëllazërimi 77 ФК братство 77
- Full name: Klubi Futbollistik Vëllazërimi 77
- Nickname: The Blues
- Founded: 1977; 49 years ago
- Ground: Vëllazërimi Arena
- Capacity: 3,000
- Chairman: Blerim Sadikoski
- Manager: Leones Santos (BRA)
Home colours	Away colours

KF Vëllazërimi 77 (Macedonian: ФК братство 77) is a defunct football club based in Kičevo, North Macedonia. They are currently not playing in any of the four highest tiers of Macedonian football.

== History ==
KF Vëllazërimi entered in the Macedonian First League in the 2005–2006 season and they were the sensation of the league after their great start. But, after some economic problems a lot of the players left the team, however Vëllazërimi managed to stay in the league. The 2006–2007 season found Vëllazërimi with new financial problems and they finished 12th (last) in the league getting relegated. The relegation forced change at the top and the new club chairman was named Gani Arsllani. He sacked coach Nazmi Ajdini referring to the poor results shown in the past year, and named Igor Nikolaevski as the new coach. Since then KF Vëllazërimi never had the finance they had before, they were relegated to the Third Macedonian League. They played in the Third Macedonian League for many seasons till summer 2014 when they got in Macedonian Second League. Now for two seasons KF Vëllazërimi is getting upper slowly but surely. In 2014/2015 they managed to stay in the league and in this season they are strong to beat home and away, many think that KF Vëllazërimi will manage to stay in Second League.

== Honours ==
- (North Macedonia) Macedonian Second League
  - Winners (1): 2004–05

== Notable former players ==
This is a list of Vëllazërimi 77 players with senior national team appearances:

1. (North Macedonia) Ardian Cuculi
2. (North Macedonia) Agon Elezi
3. (North Macedonia) Besart Ibraimi
4. (North Macedonia) Sašo Krstev
5. (North Macedonia) Sašo Lazarevski
6. (North Macedonia) Zekirija Ramadani
