= Gradski Stadium Kumanovo =

Association football stadium in Kumanovo, North Macedonia

Coordinates: 42.139833°N 21.714050°E

Gradski Stadium Kumanovo Градски стадион Куманово
- Interactive map of Gradski Stadium Kumanovo; Градски стадион Куманово
- Location: Kumanovo, North Macedonia
- Owner: Kumanovo Municipality
- Operator: Kumanovo Municipality
- Capacity: 2,000
- Surface: Grass
- Scoreboard: None

Tenants
- FK Kumanovo; FK Goblen

Gradski Stadium Kumanovo (Macedonian: Градски стадион Куманово, Gradski stadion Kumanovo) is a multi-purpose stadium in Kumanovo, Republic of North Macedonia. It is used mostly for football matches and is the home stadium of FK Kumanovo and FK Goblen. It holds 2,000 people.

== Plans for reconstruction and expansion ==
The candidate for mayor of Kumanovo in March 2012 local elections Zoran Gjorgjievski together with Lazar Popovski director of Agency for youth and sport promised reconstruction of the stadium if voters will elect Zoran, he was not elected and reconstruction did not take place.

== International fixtures ==
Date	Competition	Opponent	Score	Att.	Ref
North Macedonia (1998–present)
29 September 1998	Friendly	Egypt	2–2	5,500	
