= FK Madžari Solidarnost =

Madžari Solidarnost Junior
- Full name: Fudbalski klub Madžari Solidarnost Junior Skopje
- Nickname(s): Ѕидари (Masons)
- Founded: 1992; 33 years ago
- Ground: Boris Trajkovski Stadium
- Capacity: 2,500
- League: OFS Gazi Baba
- 2023–24: 9th
| Home colours | Away colours |

FK Madžari Solidarnost Junior (Macedonian: ФК Маџари Солидарност Јуниор) is a football club from Madžari neighborhood, Skopje, Republic of North Macedonia. They currently competing in the OFS Gazi Baba league.

== History ==
Football club Madžari Solidarnost, was formed in 1992 by joining the two football clubs FK Madžari and FK Solidarnost.

FK Madžari was founded back in 1947 as a local neighborhood club. In the course of its existence it has changed the name many times after the original name was FK Hajduk Madžari. It has also several times changed the location of the football stadium. From the football field across from the Skopje milk factory, to the field by the former police station Gazi Baba and since 1970, at its current location the Boris Trajkovski Stadium. In 1978, for the first time a youth team was formed with Kiro Karadžoski as manager. Since its existence it has played mainly in the lower division and finally achieved success by playing in the Macedonian First League for two years during the 2003–04 and 2004–05 seasons.

== Honours ==
(North Macedonia) Macedonian Second League:

- Runners-up (1): 2002–03

(North Macedonia) Macedonian Football Cup:

- Runners-up (1): 2004–05
