= GFK Pobeda =

Pobeda
- Full name: Gradski fudbalski klub Pobeda
- Nickname: Мајмуни (Monkeys)
- Founded: 1941; 85 years ago
- Ground: Stadion Goce Delčev
- Capacity: 15,000
- Chairman: Aleksandar Zabrcanec
- League: Macedonian Third League (Region 4)
- 2008–09: Macedonian First League, 8th
- Website: fkpobeda.info
Home colours	Away colours

GFK Pobeda (Macedonian: ГФК Победа) is a football club based in the city of Prilep, North Macedonia. They currently play in the Macedonian Third League (Region 4).

== History ==
The club was founded in 1941 in then Bulgaria ruled Vardar Macedonia as Goce Delčev and renamed in 1950 to FK Pobeda. FK Pobeda has been a winner of Macedonian First League for two times (eight times as Republic League in Yugoslavia), and Macedonian Football Cup for one time (eight times as Republic Cup in Yugoslavia). Their first great period was the 1950s, when they won the Republic Cup for the first time in 1951. One year later Pobeda won its first championship title in 1952 and in 1954 the second one. They waited for 4 years for their next trophy they won the Republic Cup for the second time in 1958. Next year 1959 they became champions of SR Macedonia again. They continued with their winning series in the 1960s. Pobeda won its 3rd cup in 1960, and again the cup masters won their 4th cup in 1961. Next year it was time for a new championship title in 1962, and then the duble crown in 1963. Last trophy in the 1960s was 1964 Republic Cup for the 6th time. In the late 1960s and early 1970s Pobeda had a stagnation period although it was on the top most of the time and they played pretty good in the cup too. Finally after 13 years Pobeda won again, and again it was the Macedonian Republic Cup in 1977 for the 7th time. Two years after Pobeda was back on track winning its 5th title after 16 years waiting. Two years after in 1981 Pobeda did it again 7th time champion of SR Macedonia. The 1980s was their last good period and they won their 8th championship title in 1986. Next year it was time to win the cup again and they did it for the 8th time in 1987 (and last time in the part of Yugoslavia).

The period of the 1990s, after an independence of Macedonia, didn't bring much excitement for the Pobeda's fans and they had to wait for better times. The beginning of the 2000s was a good sign and the long period of waiting was over. In 2002 it was time to win the Macedonian Football Cup for the first and only time. Two years later the club was won the champions title in 2004 for the first time since of the Macedonia's independence. They didn't wait for long to win their second, 3 years later in 2007 Pobeda was champion again and for the last time. Also, Pobeda has represented Macedonia for ten times in the European Football Cups. On 27 March 2009, UEFA, the governing body of football in Europe, charged FK Pobeda over match fixing allegations relating to a Champions League qualifying match against FC Pyunik of Armenia in 2004 They were subsequently found guilty and banned from UEFA competitions for eight years. The next season in which they will be eligible to compete is 2017–18. In April 2017, their suspension was expired.

A club which claims rights to original Pobeda's honours and records was established in 2010 under the name Viktorija, later renamed to Pobeda Junior and then to the name of the original club. However, they are not legally considered to be successors to the original Pobeda and the two clubs' track records and honours are kept separate by the Football Federation of Macedonia.

== Rivalries ==
The club's biggest rivals are Pelister, and matches between the teams are called the Derby of Pelagonia (geographical region in Macedonia).

== Supporters ==
FK Pobeda supporters are called Majmuni (Monkeys).

== Honours ==
- Macedonian First League
  - Winners (2): 2003–04, 2006–07
  - Runners-up (2): 1996–97, 1999–2000
- Macedonian Cup
  - Winners (1): 2001–02
  - Runners-up (2): 1999–2000, 2006–07
- Macedonian Republic League
  - Winners (8): 1952, 1954, 1959, 1962, 1963, 1979, 1981, 1986
- Macedonian Republic Cup
  - Winners (8): 1951, 1958, 1960, 1961, 1963, 1964, 1977, 1987

== Seasons ==
Pobeda's old logo

Season	League									Cup	European competitions	
Season	Division	P	W	D	L	F	A	Pts	Pos	Cup	European competitions	
1992–93	1. MFL	34	14	5	15	51	48	33	11th	SF		
1993–94	1. MFL	30	11	8	11	38	37	30	6th	QF		
1994–95	1. MFL	30	16	5	9	55	35	53	4th	R1		
1995–96	1. MFL	28	12	8	8	52	34	44	4th			
1996–97	1. MFL	26	17	3	6	55	26	54	2nd	SF		
1997–98	1. MFL	25	11	6	8	29	21	39	5th		UEFA Cup	QR1
1998–99	1. MFL	26	17	2	7	51	18	53	3rd	SF		
1999–00	1. MFL	26	15	7	4	57	23	52	2nd	RU	Intertoto Cup	R2
2000–01	1. MFL	26	18	2	6	64	27	56	3rd	R2	UEFA Cup	R1
2001–02	1. MFL	20	7	4	9	28	28	25	4th	W	Intertoto Cup	R2
2002–03	1. MFL	33	20	5	8	55	33	65	3rd	R2	UEFA Cup	QR
2003–04	1. MFL	33	22	5	6	78	42	71	1st	SF	Intertoto Cup	R2
2004–05	1. MFL	33	16	7	10	59	49	55	3rd	R1	Champions League	QR1
2005–06	1. MFL	33	16	6	11	58	46	54	4th	QF	Intertoto Cup	R2
2006–07	1. MFL	33	21	8	3	73	42	71	1st	RU	Intertoto Cup	R1
2007–08	1. MFL	33	12	9	12	48	48	45	6th	R1	Champions League	QR1
2008–09	1. MFL	30	8	8	14	31	47	32	8th	R2		
2009–10	1. MFL	FFM expelled Pobeda from the league							↓	R2		

== Pobeda in Europe ==
Season	Competition	Round	Opponent	Home	Away	Aggregate
1997–98	UEFA Cup	QR1	(Poland) Odra Wodzisław	2–1	0–3	2–4
1999	UEFA Intertoto Cup	R2	(Slovakia) OD Trenčín	3–1	1–3 (aet)	4–4 (4–3 p.)
1999	UEFA Intertoto Cup	R2	(Italy) Perugia	0–0	0–1	0–1
2000–01	UEFA Cup	QR	(Romania) Universitatea Craiova	1–0	1–1	2–1
2000–01	UEFA Cup	R1	(Italy) Parma	0–2	0–4	0–6
2001	UEFA Intertoto Cup	R1	(Croatia) Zagreb	1–1	2–1	3–2
2001	UEFA Intertoto Cup	R2	(Turkey) Çaykur Rizespor	2–1	2–0	4–1
2001	UEFA Intertoto Cup	R3	(Czech Republic) Chmel Blšany	0–1	0–0	0–1
2002–03	UEFA Cup	QR	(Denmark) Midtjylland	2–0	0–3 (aet)	2–3
2003	UEFA Intertoto Cup	R1	(Slovakia) Spartak Trnava	2–1	5–1	7–2
2003	UEFA Intertoto Cup	R2	(Austria) Pasching	1–1	1–2	2–3
2004–05	UEFA Champions League	QR1	(Armenia) Pyunik	1–3	1–1	2–4
2005	UEFA Intertoto Cup	R1	(Serbia and Montenegro) Smederevo	2–1	1–0	3–1
2005	UEFA Intertoto Cup	R2	(Germany) Hamburger SV	1–4	1–4	2–8
2006	UEFA Intertoto Cup	R1	(Romania) Farul Constanța	2–2	0–2	2–4
2007–08	UEFA Champions League	QR1	(Estonia) Levadia Tallinn	0–1	0–0	0–1

== Historical list of coaches ==
- (North Macedonia) Ilija Dimoski (1993–1995)
- (North Macedonia) Dragi Kanatlarovski (?–?)
- (North Macedonia) Lazar Plačkov (?–?)
- (North Macedonia) Dragi Kanatlarovski (?–?)
- (North Macedonia) Krume Mitričevski (? – 2000)
- (North Macedonia) Nikola Ilievski (2000 – ?)
- (North Macedonia) Mirsad Jonuz (2001–2002)
- (North Macedonia) Zoran Smileski (2002 – Dec 2002)
- (North Macedonia) Dragi Kanatlarovski (Dec 2002 – Jan 2004)
- (North Macedonia) Nikola Ilievski (Jan 2004 – Jun 2004)
- (North Macedonia) Dragan Hristovski (Jun 2004 – 2004)
- (Serbia and Montenegro) Petar Kurćubić (2004–2005)
- (North Macedonia) Nikolče Zdraveski (2005 – Jan 2009)
- (Serbia) Nebojša Petrović (Jan 2009 – May 2009)
- (North Macedonia) Goran Todoroski (May 2009 – 2010)

== See also ==
- 2009 European football betting scandal
