= Macedonian Football Cup =

- Founded: 1992
- Region: North Macedonia
- Teams: c. 32
- Qualifier for: UEFA Conference League
- Current champions: Sileks (4th title)
- Most championships: Vardar (6 titles)
- Broadcaster: Arena Sport (only final) MRT (only final)
- Website: ffm.mk
- 2026–27 Macedonian Football Cup

The Cup of Macedonia (Macedonian: Куп на Македонија, Kup na Makedonija) is the top knockout tournament and the second most important football competition in North Macedonia after the Macedonian First League championship. The cup was established in 1992 after local clubs had abandoned the Yugoslav First League and Yugoslav Cup competitions following the breakup of Yugoslavia.

As of 2014, a total of 16 clubs have reached the cup finals and the most successful side in the history of the competition is Vardar, who have triumphed 6 times in their 7 cup final appearances. They are followed by Rabotnički and Sloga Jugomagnat, who have won 4 titles.

== What the Cup of Macedonia represents ==
The big cup for the Cup of Macedonia was made by the academic sculptor Naso Bekjarovski. It is 51 centimeters tall and weighs 10.5 kilograms and reflects all the important historical, cultural, geographical and natural values and treasures of Macedonia. The soccer ball represents a poppy, and the top flower of the poppy is made of four petals that symbolize the four parts of Macedonia. Under the ball are the flames that symbolize the centuries-old struggle of the Macedonian people. The pillar is wrapped with vines and grapes that symbolize the gourd, the base is with fragments of the history and cultural heritage of Macedonia, the Stone Bridge and the pattern of the Macedonian carpet.

== Winners ==
Macedonian Cup's former logo

Key

†	Match decided by a penalty shootout after extra time
‡	Winning team won The Double

Season	Winner	Score	Runners–up	Venue	Attendance
1992–93	Vardar ‡ (1)	1–0	Pelister	Gradski stadion, Skopje	20,000
1993–94	Sileks (1)	1–1 (a.e.t.), 3–1 pen.	Pelister	Gradski stadion, Skopje	10,000
1994–95	Vardar ‡ (2)	2–1	Sileks	Gradski stadion, Skopje	9,000
1995–96	Sloga Jugomagnat (1)	0–0 (a.e.t.), 5–3 pen.	Vardar	Gradski stadion, Skopje	18,000
1996–97	Sileks ‡ (2)	4–1	Sloga Jugomagnat	Gradski stadion, Kavadarci	4,000
1997–98	Vardar (3)	2–0	Sloga Jugomagnat	Gradski stadion, Skopje	16,000
1998–99	Vardar (4)	2–0	Sloga Jugomagnat	Gradski stadion, Skopje	14,000
1999–2000	Sloga Jugomagnat ‡ (2)	6–0	Pobeda	Stadion Goce Delchev, Prilep	8,000
2000–01	Pelister (1)	2–1	Sloga Jugomagnat	Gradski stadion, Skopje	5,000
2001–02	Pobeda (1)	3–1	Cementarnica 55	Stadion Mladost, Strumica	5,500
2002–03	Cementarnica 55 (1)	4–4 (a.e.t.), 3–2 pen.	Sloga Jugomagnat	Gradski stadion, Skopje	7,000
2003–04	Sloga Jugomagnat (3)	1–0	Napredok	Gradski stadion, Skopje	3,000
2004–05	Bashkimi (1)	2–1	Madjari Solidarnost	Gradski stadion, Skopje	8,000
2005–06	Makedonija G.P. (1)	3–2	Shkëndija	Gradski stadion, Skopje	11,000
2006–07	Vardar (5)	2–1	Pobeda	Gradski stadion, Skopje	5,500
2007–08	Rabotnichki ‡ (1)	2–0	Milano	Gradski stadion, Skopje	5,000
2008–09	Rabotnichki (2)	1–1 (a.e.t.), 6–5 pen.	Makedonija G.P.	Philip II Arena, Skopje	3,500
2009–10	Teteks (1)	3–2	Rabotnichki	Philip II Arena, Skopje	4,000
2010–11	Metalurg (1)	2–0	Teteks	Stadion Goce Delchev, Prilep	3,000
2011–12	Renova (1)	3–1	Rabotnichki	Gradski stadion, Shtip	500
2012–13	Teteks (2)	1–1 (a.e.t.), 6–5 pen.	Shkëndija	Philip II Arena, Skopje	0
2013–14	Rabotnichki ‡ (3)	2–0	Metalurg	Philip II Arena, Skopje	1,000
2014–15	Rabotnichki (4)	2–1	Teteks	Philip II Arena, Skopje	3,800
2015–16	Shkëndija (1)	2–0	Rabotnichki	Philip II Arena, Skopje	8,000
2016–17	Pelister (2)	0–0 (a.e.t.), 4–3 pen.	Shkëndija	Stadion Mladost, Strumica	6,000
2017–18	Shkëndija ‡ (2)	3–0	Pelister	Stadion Mladost, Strumica	2,500
2018–19	Akademija Pandev (1)	2–2 (a.e.t.), 4–2 pen.	Makedonija G.P.	Toshe Proeski Arena, Skopje	3,000
2019–20	Abandoned due to COVID-19 pandemic in Macedonia				
2020–21	Sileks (3)	0–0 (a.e.t.), 4–3 pen.	Akademija Pandev	Toshe Proeski Arena, Skopje	0
2021–22	Makedonija G.P. (2)	0–0 (a.e.t.), 4–3 pen.	Sileks	Toshe Proeski Arena, Skopje	500
2022–23	Makedonija G.P. (3)	0–0 (a.e.t.), 2–0 pen.	Struga	Petar Miloševski Training Centre, Skopje	500
2023–24	Tikvesh (1)	2–1	Voska Sport	Toshe Proeski Arena, Skopje	7,000
2024–25	Vardar (6)	2–0	Struga	Toshe Proeski Arena, Skopje	6,000
2025–26	Sileks (4)	1–0	Shkëndija	Toshe Proeski Arena, Skopje	4,000

== Performance by club ==
Club	Winners	Runners-up	Winning years	Runner-up years
Vardar	6	1	1993, 1995, 1998, 1999, 2007, 2025	1996
Rabotnichki	4	3	2008, 2009, 2014, 2015	2010, 2012, 2016
Sileks	4	2	1994, 1997, 2021, 2026	1995, 2022
Sloga Jugomagnat^{[A]}	3	5	1996, 2000, 2004	1997, 1998, 1999, 2001, 2003
Makedonija G.P.	3	2	2006, 2022, 2023	2009, 2019
Shkëndija	2	4	2016, 2018	2006, 2013, 2017, 2026
Pelister	2	3	2001, 2017	1993, 1994, 2018
Teteks	2	2	2010, 2013	2011, 2015
Pobeda^{[B]}	1	2	2002	2000, 2007
Cementarnica 55	1	1	2003	2002
Metalurg	1	1	2011	2014
AP Brera	1	1	2019	2021
Bashkimi^{[C]}	1	–	2005	–
Renova	1	–	2012	–
Tikvesh	1	–	2024	–
Struga	–	2	–	2023, 2025
Napredok	–	1	–	2004
Madjari Solidarnost	–	1	–	2005
Milano	–	1	–	2008
Voska Sport	–	1	–	2024

== Titles by city ==
City	Titles	Winning clubs
Skopje	18	Vardar (6), Rabotnički (4), Makedonija G.P. (3), Sloga Jugomagnat (3), Cementarnica 55 (1), Metalurg (1)
Tetovo	5	Teteks (2), Shkëndija (2), Renova (1)
Kratovo	4	Sileks (4)
Bitola	2	Pelister (2)
Kavadarci	1	Tikvesh (1)
Kumanovo	1	Bashkimi (1)
Prilep	1	Pobeda (1)
Strumica	1	AP Brera (1)

== Republic Cup ==
Season	Champion
1946–47	Garnizon Skopje
1947–48	FK Teteks
1948–49	unknown
1949–50	FK Teteks
1950–51	FK Pobeda
1951–52	Garnizon Skopje
1952–53	FK Vardar 2nd team or B-squad
1953–54	FK Rabotnichki
1954–55	FK Vardar
1955–56	not held
1956–57	FK Rabotnichki
1957–58	FK Pobeda
1958–59	FK Pelister
1959–60	FK Pobeda
1960–61	FK Pobeda
1961–62	FK Pelister
1962–63	FK Pobeda
1963–64	FK Pobeda
1964–65	FK Vardar
1965–66	FK Vardar
1966–67	FK Vardar
1967–68	FK Vardar
1968–69	FK Vardar

Season	Champion
1969–70	FK Vardar
1970–71	FK Vardar
1971–72	FK Vardar
1972–73	FK Ohrid
1973–74	FK Rabotnichki
1974–75	not held
1975–76	FK Vardar 2nd team or B-squad
1976–77	FK Pobeda
1977–78	FK Teteks
1978–79	FK Vardar
1979–80	FK Vardar
1980–81	FK Bregalnica
1981–82	FK Teteks
1982–83	FK Rabotnichki
1983–84	FK Belasica
1984–85	FK Pelister
1985–86	FK Belasica
1986–87	FK Pobeda
1987–88	FK Rabotnichki
1988–89	FK Sileks
1989–90	FK Sileks
1990–91	FK Pelister
1991–92	FK Vardar

== Notes ==
A. The Sloga Jugomagnat, which traced its roots back to 1927 went excluded after a missing two games in the 2009–10 season and folded in 2009. In 2012, a successor club called FK Shkupi was founded after a merger with FK Albarsa which started in the 3rd League. The club won first place in the 2012–13 season and after was a failed to promote to the 2nd League, the club was a merged with FK Korzo and a placed in the 2nd League for the 2013–14 season (in fall season was played as Korzo). However, despite club officials and fans claims that the Shkupi is the Sloga Jugomagnat's successor, neither the Football Federation of Macedonia nor UEFA recognize Sloga Jugomagnat's titles and statistics before 2009 as being part of the 2012 founded Shkupi's track record.

B. The original Pobeda, which was traced its roots back to 1941 went banned from UEFA competitions in 2010 and will be eligible in the 2017–18 season. In 2010, a successor club called FK Viktorija (later renamed to Pobeda Junior) was founded which started competing in the 3rd league. Despite club officials and fans claims that the new Pobeda Junior is the Pobeda's successor, neither the Football Federation of Macedonia nor UEFA recognize Pobeda's titles and statistics before 2010 as being part of the 2010 founded Pobeda Junior's track record. In 2026 the original Pobeda was refounded.

C. The original Bashkimi, which was traced its roots back to 1947 went bankrupt and folded in 2008. In 2011, a successor club called KF Bashkimi 1947 was founded which started competing in the 3rd league. Despite club officials and fans claims that the new Bashkimi is the defunct club's successor, neither the Football Federation of Macedonia nor UEFA recognize Bashkimi's titles and statistics before 2008 as being part of the 2011-founded Bashkimi's track record.
