= List of FK Vardar seasons =

This is a list of all seasons played by FK Vardar in national and European football, from 1947 (the year the club was officially founded) to the most recent completed season.

Vardar is the most popular and renowned Macedonian football club both domestically and abroad, having won 10 national championships and 5 national cups.

== All-Time Yugoslav First League ==
As of 29 May 2017

Rank	Club	G	W	D	L	GF	GA	GD	P
11	FK Vardar	1041	343	252	444	1249	1528	−279	933

== All-Time Macedonian First League ==
As of 10 April 2024

Rank	Club	G	W	D	L	GF	GA	GD	P
1	FK Vardar	955	512	232	211	1651	851	+800	1728

== Seasons ==
=== SFR Yugoslavia (1947–1992) ===
Season	League									Cup	Competition	Round	Player	Goals
Season	Division	P	W	D	L	F	A	Pts	Pos	Cup	European competitions		Top goalscorer(s)	
1947	—	—	—	—	—	—	—	—	—	R32			—	—
1947–48	Div 1	18	5	4	9	22	39	14	8th	R32			(Socialist Federal Republic of Yugoslavia) Jane Janevski	9
1948–49	Div 2	18	6	5	7	28	34	17	7th	R64			(Socialist Federal Republic of Yugoslavia) Jane Janevski (Socialist Federal Republic of Yugoslavia) Gota Sezair	7
1950	Div 2	20	8	4	8	28	22	20	9th	R16			(Socialist Federal Republic of Yugoslavia) Gjorgje Cincievski	10
1951	Div 2	30	19	4	7	64	24	42	1st	R32			(Socialist Federal Republic of Yugoslavia) Gjorgje Cincievski	19
1952	Div 1	16	7	1	8	21	33	15	7th^{[B]}	R32			(Socialist Federal Republic of Yugoslavia) Dragan Georgievski	8
1952–53	Div 1	26	7	5	10	37	46	19	9th	DNQ			(Socialist Federal Republic of Yugoslavia) Gjorgje Cincievski	10
1953–54	Div 1	26	5	10	11	31	38	20	9th	DNQ			(Socialist Federal Republic of Yugoslavia) Stojan Velkovski	8
1954–55	Div 1	26	5	8	13	24	41	18	13th	R16			(Socialist Federal Republic of Yugoslavia) Urosh Petrovski	4
1955–56	Div 2 (IV Zone)	24	15	6	3	71	28	36	1st	—N/a				
1956–57	Div 1	22	9	5	12	30	44	23	11th	DNQ			(Socialist Federal Republic of Yugoslavia) Vladimir Nikolovski	11
1957–58	Div 1	22	10	6	10	30	44	26	7th	DNQ			(Socialist Federal Republic of Yugoslavia) Stojan Velkovski	7
1958–59	Div 1	22	4	3	15	23	47	11	12th	R32			(Socialist Federal Republic of Yugoslavia) Andon Donchevski	11
1959–60	Div 2 (East)	22	13	3	6	49	29	29	1st	R32			(Socialist Federal Republic of Yugoslavia) Andon Donchevski	12
1960–61	Div 1	22	6	5	11	21	36	17	10th	W			(Socialist Federal Republic of Yugoslavia) Andon Donchevski	7
1961–62	Div 1	22	7	4	11	30	37	18	11th	R32	Cup Winners' Cup	R1	(Socialist Federal Republic of Yugoslavia) Andon Donchevski	12
1962–63	Div 2 (East)	30	18	8	4	50	24	44	1st	QF			(Socialist Federal Republic of Yugoslavia) Sokrat Mojsov	18
1963–64	Div 1	30	6	8	12	28	35	20	14th^{[C]}	DNQ			(Socialist Federal Republic of Yugoslavia) Petar Shulinchevski	9
1964–65	Div 1	30	6	11	11	23	33	23	11th	SF	Balkans Cup	GS	(Socialist Federal Republic of Yugoslavia) Nikola Rudić	6
1965–66	Div 1	30	12	4	14	47	44	28	10th	QF	Balkans Cup	GS	(Socialist Federal Republic of Yugoslavia) Metodije Spasovski	12
1966–67	Div 1	30	13	5	12	41	44	31	8th	SF	Balkans Cup	GS	(Socialist Federal Republic of Yugoslavia) Petar Shulinchevski	14
1967–68	Div 1	30	10	10	10	31	37	30	6th	R16	Mitropa Cup	SF	(Socialist Federal Republic of Yugoslavia) Petar Shulinchevski	7
1968–69	Div 1	34	12	9	13	37	36	33	10th	R16	Mitropa Cup	R16	(Socialist Federal Republic of Yugoslavia) Metodije Spasovski	14
1969–70	Div 1	34	9	8	17	25	46	26	17th	R16	Mitropa Cup	R16	(Socialist Federal Republic of Yugoslavia) Metodije Spasovski	5
1970–71	Div 2 (East)	30	19	5	6	46	18	43	1st	R16			(Socialist Federal Republic of Yugoslavia) Krsto Vrbica	16
1971–72	Div 1	34	8	14	12	31	44	30	11th	SF			(Socialist Federal Republic of Yugoslavia) Vancho Balevski	8
1972–73	Div 1	34	10	11	13	35	50	31	10th	R32	Balkans Cup	RU	(Socialist Federal Republic of Yugoslavia) Boro Uzunov	8
1973–74	Div 1	34	12	7	15	38	40	31	17th	SF			(Socialist Federal Republic of Yugoslavia) Dušan Šujica	12
1974–75	Div 1	34	7	15	12	35	41	29	16th	—N/a	Balkans Cup	RU	(Socialist Federal Republic of Yugoslavia) Vancho Balevski	11
1975–76	Div 1	34	8	12	14	27	36	28	17th	R32			(Socialist Federal Republic of Yugoslavia) Dušan Šujica	6
1976–77	Div 2 (East)	34	20	5	9	55	26	45	2nd	QF			(Socialist Federal Republic of Yugoslavia) Borche Micevski	13
1977–78	Div 2 (East)	34	13	11	10	44	36	37	3rd	R32			(Socialist Federal Republic of Yugoslavia) Vasil Ringov	12
1978–79	Div 2 (East)	30	19	5	6	63	30	43	1st	QF			(Socialist Federal Republic of Yugoslavia) Risto Gligorovski	14
1979–80	Div 1	34	10	15	9	43	41	35	7th	R32			(Socialist Federal Republic of Yugoslavia) Vasil Ringov	10
1980–81	Div 1	34	11	11	12	41	48	33	11th	R32			(Socialist Federal Republic of Yugoslavia) Vasil Ringov	11
1981–82	Div 1	34	12	6	16	43	51	30	14th	R32			(Socialist Federal Republic of Yugoslavia) Vasil Ringov	15
1982–83	Div 1	34	13	9	12	43	47	35	8th	R16			(Socialist Federal Republic of Yugoslavia) Vasil Ringov	7
1983–84	Div 1	34	14	3	17	46	56	31	15th	R32			(Socialist Federal Republic of Yugoslavia) Darko Panchev	19
1984–85	Div 1	34	16	5	13	67	58	37	5th	R16			(Socialist Federal Republic of Yugoslavia) Darko Panchev	20
1985–86	Div 1	34	14	6	14	52	59	34	8th	R16	UEFA Cup	R2	(Socialist Federal Republic of Yugoslavia) Darko Panchev	12
1986–87	Div 1	34	15	8	11	40	39	38	5th^{[D]}	R32			(Socialist Federal Republic of Yugoslavia) Darko Panchev	18
1987–88	Div 1	34	15	7	12	37	40	37	6th	SF	European Cup	R1	(Socialist Federal Republic of Yugoslavia) Darko Panchev	13
1988–89	Div 1	34	13	7 (3)	14	46	51	29	9th	R32			(Socialist Federal Republic of Yugoslavia) Tome Trajanovski	7
1989–90	Div 1	34	8	2 (1)	24	33	64	17	18th	QF			(Socialist Federal Republic of Yugoslavia) Bogoljub Ranđelović	8
1990–91	Div 2	36	19	7 (4)	10	58	38	42	2nd	R32			(Socialist Federal Republic of Yugoslavia) Vasil Gunev	14
1991–92	Div 1	33	15	6 (4)	12	50	34	34	6th	R16			(Socialist Federal Republic of Yugoslavia) Vasil Gunev	8

=== Macedonia (1992–present) ===
Season	League									Cup	Competition	Round	Player	Goals
Season	Division	P	W	D	L	F	A	Pts	Pos	Cup	European competitions		Top goalscorer(s)	
1992–93	1. MFL	34	27	7	0	119	16	61	1st	W			(North Macedonia) Saša Ćirić	36
1993–94	1. MFL	30	23	5	2	85	16	51	1st	SF			(North Macedonia) Sasho Miloshevski (North Macedonia) Goran Petreski	10
1994–95	1. MFL	30	23	7	0	79	17	76	1st	W	UEFA Cup	PR	(North Macedonia) Saša Ćirić	35
1995–96	1. MFL	28	17	6	5	60	22	57	3rd	RU	UEFA Cup	R1		
1996–97	1. MFL	26	11	10	5	32	15	40^{−3}	4th	R16	UEFA Cup	QR		
1997–98	1. MFL	25	12	5	8	34	25	41	4th	W				
1998–99	1. MFL	26	15	4	7	61	32	49	4th	W	Cup Winners' Cup	QR	(North Macedonia) Vancho Trajchev	14
1999–2000	1. MFL	26	7	8	11	39	38	29	10th	QF	UEFA Cup	QR	(North Macedonia) Goran Petreski	10
2000–01	1. MFL	26	20	3	3	52	16	63	2nd	QF			(North Macedonia) Zoran Miserdovski	11
2001–02	1. MFL	20	11	4	5	28	16	37	1st	SF	UEFA Cup	QR	(Bulgaria) Mario Petkov	12
2002–03	1. MFL	33	22	6	5	73	37	72	1st	QF	Champions League	QR2	(Brazil) Rogério Oliveira	15
2003–04	1. MFL	33	17	9	7	66	39	60	3rd	QF	Champions League; UEFA Cup	QR3; R1	(Brazil) (North Macedonia) Wandeir	17
2004–05	1. MFL	33	22	6	5	68	34	72	2nd	R16	Intertoto Cup	R3	(Brazil) (North Macedonia) Wandeir	19
2005–06	1. MFL	33	19	7	7	42	19	61	3rd	QF	UEFA Cup	QR2	(North Macedonia) Riste Naumov	15
2006–07	1. MFL	33	17	8	8	63	34	59	4th	W	UEFA Cup	QR1	(Brazil) (North Macedonia) Wandeir	12
2007–08	1. MFL	33	12	11	10	45	40	47	4th	QF	UEFA Cup	QR1	(North Macedonia) Jovan Kostovski	10
2008–09	1. MFL	33	11	12	7	35	23	45	5th	R16			(North Macedonia) Boban Janchevski	10
2009–10	1. MFL	33	9	6	11	31	28	30^{−3}	6th	R32			(Bosnia and Herzegovina) Boško Stupić	7
2010–11	1. MFL	30	9	5	19	24	44	29^{−3}	11th^{[E]}	QF			(North Macedonia) Fahrudin Gjurgjevikj	5
2011–12	1. MFL	33	22	10	1	50	15	76	1st	SF			(North Macedonia) Filip Ivanovski	24
2012–13	1. MFL	33	20	8	5	71	21	68	1st	SF	Champions League	QR2	(North Macedonia) Jovan Kostovski	22
2013–14	1. MFL	33	15	11	7	55	32	56	5th	R16	Champions League	QR2	(North Macedonia) Aco Stojkov (North Macedonia) Filip Petrov	9
2014–15	1. MFL	32	20	9	3	56	21	69	1st	QF			(North Macedonia) Filip Ivanovski	11
2015–16	1. MFL	32	25	5	2	67	17	80	1st	QF	Champions League	QR2	(North Macedonia) Dejan Blazhevski	9
2016–17	1. MFL	36	25	9	3	75	24	83	1st	SF	Champions League	QR2	(North Macedonia) Dejan Blazhevski (Brazil) Jonathan Balotelli	11
2017–18	1. MFL	36	16	8	12	53	41	56	2nd	QF	Champions League; Europa League	QR3; GS	(Armenia) Tigran Barseghyan	9
2018–19	1. MFL	36	17	13	6	45	23	56	2nd	R16	Europa League	QR1	(North Macedonia) Darko Micevski	8
2019–20^{[F]}	1. MFL	23	13	7	3	33	14	46	1st	R16			(North Macedonia) Daniel Avramovski	10
2020–21	1. MFL	33	7	10	16	32	60	31	11th	R16			(North Macedonia) Martin Mirčevski	8
2021–22	2. MFL (West)	27	18	4	5	47	15	58	3rd	QF			(North Macedonia) Filip Petkovski	12
2022–23	2. MFL	30	19	6	5	55	20	63	3rd	QF			(North Macedonia) Dario Desnikj (North Macedonia) Vladimir Zhoglev	9
2023–24	1. MFL	33	10	7	16	28	43	37	10th	R16			(North Macedonia) Darko Glishikj	4
2024–25	1. MFL	33	12	9	12	39	37	45	5th	W			(Bosnia and Herzegovina) Goran Zakarić	10
2025–26	1. MFL	33	26	5	2	80	21	83	1st	QF	Conference League	QR2	(North Macedonia) Azer Omeragić	14

=== Notes ===
- ^{A} Between the 1988–89 and 1991–92 seasons drawn games went to penalties with only the shootout winners gaining the point. Figures in brackets in the drawn games column represent points won in such shootouts.
- ^{B} The 1952 Yugoslav First League was shortened and completed over a period of three and a half months, beginning on 2 March and ending on 22 June. The reason for the changes was a desire to start the next season in the fall of 1952, thus implementing the fall–spring format that had become a norm all across Europe by this time. The clubs were initially divided into two groups of six teams each, where everyone within a given group played each other twice (home and away). The statistics for the 1952 season thus show season totals and not just the final standings in the second stage group.
- ^{C} Vardar was initially relegated, but was decided that would be allowed to remain in the top-flight Yugoslav First League the following season due to the devastating earthquake that hit Skopje in July 1963. The thinking on the part of Yugoslav politicians was that having a team in the top-tier league would be a boost to the morale of inhabitants of Skopje.
- ^{D} Due to the match-fixing scandal in the 1985–86 season, ten clubs had started the 1986–87 Yugoslav First League season with a deduction of 6 points. Vardar, who had not been deducted any points, won the title and participated in the 1987–88 European Cup. After post-season legal proceedings the situation was resolved in July 1987 with a court ruling which nullified the deductions and which meant that the title was given back to Partizan and that Vardar finished the season in fifth place.
- ^{E} Vardar was initially relegated, but was stayed in the league because of fusion with Miravci.
- ^{F} The season was abandoned due to COVID-19 pandemic in North Macedonia. Vardar were declared the champions but not given the licence for the European competitions for the 2020–21 season.
