= 1995–96 FK Vardar season =

Vardar
1995–96 season
- Chairman: Borche Damev
- Manager: Ilija Dimovski; Vancho Trpevski
- Stadium: Gradski stadion Skopje
- First League: 3rd
- Macedonian Cup: Runners-up
- UEFA Cup: First round

The 1995–96 season was the 48th season in Vardar’s history and their fourth in the Macedonian First League. Their 1st place finish in the 1994–95 season meant it was their 4th successive season playing in the First League.

In the championship Vardar was finished third, below Sileks and Sloga Jugomagnat and were lost in the final of the Macedonian Cup against Sloga Jugomagnat after penalty shoot-out, but qualified for the 1996–97 UEFA Cup.

== Competitions ==
=== Overall ===
Competition	Started round	Final result	First match	Last match
1995–96 Macedonian First League	–	3rd	20 August 1995	9 June 1996
1995–96 Macedonian Cup	First round	Runners-up	13 August 1995	23 May 1996
1995–96 UEFA Cup	Preliminary round	First round	8 August 1995	28 September 1995

=== First League ===
==== Classification ====
Pos	Team	Pld	W	D	L	GF	GA	GD	Pts	Qualification or relegation
1	Sileks (C)	28	21	7	0	74	20	+54	70	Qualification for the UEFA Cup preliminary round
2	Sloga Jugomagnat	28	18	4	6	48	19	+29	58	Qualification for the Cup Winners' Cup qualifying round
3	Vardar	28	17	6	5	60	22	+38	57	Qualification for the UEFA Cup preliminary round
4	Pobeda	28	12	8	8	52	34	+18	44	
5	Pelister	28	13	4	11	51	40	+11	43	

Source: MacedonianFootball.com, RSSSF.org
Rules for classification: 1) Points; 2) Goal difference; 3) Goals scored; 4) Head-to-head points; 5) Head-to-head goal difference; 6) Head-to-head away goals scored (only if two teams); 7) Head-to-head goals scored; 8) Draw; 9) Play-off. (Note: Criteria 2, 3 and 8 is only used if not deciding Champion, teams for UEFA competitions or relegation).
(C) Champions

==== Results by round ====
Round	1	2	3	4	5	6	7	8	9	10	11	12	13	14	15	16	17	18	19	20	21	22	23	24	25	26	27	28	29	30
Ground	H	A	H	A	H	A	H	A	H	A	–	H	A	H	A	A	H	A	H	A	H	A	H	A	H	–	A	H	A	H
Result	W	W	W	D	D	W	W	D	W	L	–	W	W	W	L	W	W	L	W	W	W	D	D	L	W	–	L	W	D	W
Position	2	2	1	2	2	2	2	2	1	3	3	3	3	2	3	3	3	3	3	3	3	3	3	3	3	3	3	3	3	3

Source: Competitive Matches
A = Away; H = Home; W = Win; D = Draw; L = Loss

==== Matches ====
Round	Date	Venue	Opponent	Score	Vardar Scorers
1	20 Aug	H	FCU 55	2 – 1	
2	27 Aug	A	Tikvesh	1 – 0	
3	10 Sep	H	Osogovo	6 – 0	
4	17 Sep	A	Pobeda	1 – 1	
5	24 Sep	H	Makedonija	1 – 1	
6	1 Oct	A	Ljuboten	2 – 0	
7	15 Oct	H	Balkan	3 – 0	
8	22 Oct	A	Sileks	2 – 2	
9	25 Oct	H	Ohrid	2 – 1	
10	29 Oct	A	Pelister	1 – 2	
11	5 Nov	—	Bye	—	—
12	8 Nov	H	Belasica	3 – 1	
13	19 Nov	A	Rudar Probishtip	5 – 0	
14	26 Nov	H	Sasa	4 – 1	
15	3 Dec	A	Sloga Jugomagnat	0 – 1	
16	10 Mar	A	FCU 55	2 – 1	
17	17 Mar	H	Tikvesh	5 – 1	
18	24 Mar	A	Osogovo	0 – 1	
19	31 Mar	H	Pobeda	1 – 0	
20	3 Apr	A	Makedonija	2 – 1	
21	7 Apr	H	Ljuboten	2 – 0	
22	14 Apr	A	Balkan	0 – 0	
23	28 Apr	H	Sileks	2 – 2	
24	5 May	A	Ohrid	0 – 1	
25	8 May	H	Pelister	7 – 0	
26	12 May	—	Bye	—	—
27	15 May	A	Belasica	1 – 2	
28	19 May	H	Rudar Probishtip	3 – 1	
29	5 Jun	A	Sasa	1 – 1	
30	9 Jun	H	Sloga Jugomagnat	1 – 0	

Sources: RSSSF.no, Google Groups

=== Macedonian Football Cup ===
Round	Date	Venue	Opponent	Score	Vardar Scorers
R1	13 Aug	H	Pobeda Valandovo	13 – 0	
R2	8 Nov	H	Balkan	7 – 2	
R2	7 Dec	A	Balkan	3 – 0	
QF	3 Mar	A	Makedonija	1 – 0	
QF	20 Mar	H	Makedonija	3 – 1	
SF	17 Apr	H	Pelister	3 – 0	
SF	1 May	A	Pelister	1 – 1	
Final	23 May	N	Sloga Jugomagnat	0 – 0 (3 – 5 p)	

Source: Google Groups

=== UEFA Cup ===
Round	Date	Venue	Opponent	Score	Vardar Scorers
PR	8 Aug	H	Samtredia (Georgia (country))	1 – 0	Nikolovski
PR	22 Aug	AR (Georgia (country))	Samtredia (Georgia (country))	2 – 0	Serafimovski, Petreski
R1	14 Sep	H	Bordeaux (France)	0 – 2	
R1	28 Sep	A (France)	Bordeaux (France)	1 – 1	Serafimovski
