= 1996–97 FK Vardar season =

Vardar
1996–97 season
- Chairman: Borche Damev
- Manager: Slobodan Gorachinov; Dragi Kanatlarovski
- Stadium: Gradski stadion Skopje; Stadion Nikola Mantov, Kochani
- First League: 4th
- Macedonian Cup: Group stage
- UEFA Cup: Qualifying round

The 1996–97 season was the 49th season in Vardar’s history and their fifth in the Macedonian First League. Their 3rd-place finish in the 1995–96 season meant it was their 5th successive season playing in the First League.

== Competitions ==
=== Overall ===
Competition	Started round	Final result	First match	Last match
1996–97 Macedonian First League	–	4th	16 August 1996	1 June 1997
1996–97 Macedonian Cup	First round	Group stage	11 August 1996	19 March 1997
1996–97 UEFA Cup	Preliminary round	Qualifying round	17 July 1996	20 August 1996

=== First League ===
==== Classification ====
Pos	Team	Pld	W	D	L	GF	GA	GD	Pts	Qualification or relegation
2	Pobeda	26	17	3	6	55	26	+29	54	Qualification for the UEFA Cup first qualifying round
3	Sloga Jugomagnat	26	13	7	6	42	25	+17	46	Qualification for the Cup Winners' Cup qualifying round (Note: Since Sileks, winners of 1996–97 Macedonian Football Cup, was qualified for the 1997–98 UEFA Champions League, losing cup finalists Sloga Jugomagnat earned a spot in the qualifying round of the 1997–98 UEFA Cup Winners' Cup.)
4	Vardar (Note: Vardar were deducted 3 points and fined 48,000 German marks for fielding a suspended player in the match against Sloga Jugomagnat in the 1st round.)	26	11	10	5	32	15	+17	40	
5	Sasa	26	10	7	9	36	31	+5	37	
6	Bregalnica Shtip	26	10	5	11	30	33	−3	35	

Source: MacedonianFootball.com, RSSSF.org
Rules for classification: 1) Points; 2) Goal difference; 3) Goals scored; 4) Head-to-head points; 5) Head-to-head goal difference; 6) Head-to-head away goals scored (only if two teams); 7) Head-to-head goals scored; 8) Draw; 9) Play-off. (Note: Criteria 2, 3 and 8 is only used if not deciding Champion, teams for UEFA competitions or relegation).

==== Results by round ====
Round	1	2	3	4	5	6	7	8	9	10	11	12	13	14	15	16	17	18	19	20	21	22	23	24	25	26
Ground	A	H	A	H	A	H	A	H	A	A	H	A	H	H	H	H	A	H	A	H	A	H	H	A	H	A
Result	L	W	L	D	W	W	W	W	W	D	W	D	W	W	W	L	L	W	D	D	D	D	D	L	D	D
Position	14	13	13	12	12	8	6	5	3	4	3	4	3	3	2	3	3	3	3	4	4	4	4	4	4	4

Source: Competitive Matches
A = Away; H = Home; W = Win; D = Draw; L = Loss

==== Matches ====
Round	Date	Venue	Opponent	Score	Vardar Scorers
1	16 Aug	A	Sloga Jugomagnat	0 – 3 (1 – 0)^{1}	
2	25 Aug	H	Tikvesh	4 – 0	
3	1 Sep	A	Sileks	0 – 1	
4	8 Sep	H	Pelister	0 – 0	
5	15 Sep	A	Rudar Probishtip	5 – 0	
6	22 Sep	H	Makedonija	3 – 0	
7	29 Sep	A	Cementarnica 55	1 – 0	
8	13 Oct	H	Balkan	1 – 0	
9	20 Oct	A	Pobeda	2 – 1	
10	27 Oct	A	Sasa	0 – 0	
11	3 Nov	H	Belasica	3 – 0	
12	17 Nov	A	Bregalnica Shtip	1 – 1	
13	24 Nov	H	Shkëndija	3 – 1	
14	2 Mar	H	Sloga Jugomagnat	1 – 0	
15	9 Mar	A	Tikvesh	2 – 0	Shainovski, Todorovski
16	16 Mar	H	Sileks	0 – 3^{2}	
17	23 Mar	A	Pelister	0 – 1	
18	6 Apr	HR	Rudar Probishtip	7 – 0	
19	13 Apr	A	Makedonija	0 – 0	
20	20 Apr	HR	Cementarnica 55	1 – 1	
21	27 Apr	A	Balkan	0 – 0	
22	4 May	HR	Pobeda	0 – 0	
23	11 May	HR	Sasa	0 – 0	
24	18 May	AR	Belasica	1 – 3	
25	25 May	HR	Bregalnica Shtip	0 – 0	
26	1 Jun	AR	Shkëndija	1 – 1	

^{1} Match awarded to Sloga Jugomagnat because Vardar was fielded the suspended player.

^{2} Match abandoned after 86 minutes due to the crowd trouble. Sileks were awarded a 0–3 win, and Vardar was punished with the playing host games at the neutral venue in the rest of season.

Sources: RSSSF.no, Google Groups

=== Macedonian Football Cup ===
==== Group stage table ====
Pos	Team	Pld	W	D	L	GF	GA	GD	Pts	Qualification
1	Makedonija G.P.	6	4	2	0	7	2	+5	14	Semi-finals
2	Vardar	6	1	4	1	6	6	0	7	
3	Bregalnica Shtip	6	1	2	3	7	9	−2	5	
4	Tikvesh	6	1	2	3	7	10	−3	5	

Source: rsssf.org

==== Matches ====
Round	Date	Venue	Opponent	Score	Vardar Scorers
R1	11 Aug	A	Vardar Prdejci	2 – 0	
GS	4 Sep	H	Bregalnica Shtip	1 – 1	
GS	16 Oct	A	Tikvesh	2 – 2	
GS	6 Nov	A	Makedonija	0 – 0	
GS	1 Dec	A	Bregalnica Shtip	1 – 3	
GS	23 Feb	H	Tikvesh	2 – 0	
GS	19 Mar	HR	Makedonija	0 – 0	

Source: Google Groups

=== UEFA Cup ===
Round	Date	Venue	Opponent	Score	Vardar Scorers
PR	17 Jul	A (Slovenia)	Gorica (Slovenia)	1 – 0	Trajchev
PR	24 Jul	H	Gorica (Slovenia)	2 – 1	Trajchev, Jakimovski
QR	6 Aug	A (Sweden)	Halmstad (Sweden)	0 – 0	
QR	20 Aug	H	Halmstad (Sweden)	0 – 1	
