= 1994–95 FK Vardar season =

Vardar
1994–95 season
- Chairman: Filip Gjurchinovski
- Manager: Gjoko Hadjievski
- Stadium: Gradski stadion Skopje
- First League: 1st
- Macedonian Cup: Winner
- UEFA Cup: Preliminary round
- Top goalscorer: Saša Ćirić (35)

The 1994–95 season was the 47th season in Vardar’s history and their third in the Macedonian First League. Their 1st place finish in the 1993–94 season meant it was their 3rd successive season playing in the First League.

In that season Vardar was won the championship for the third consecutive time and their second Macedonian Cup, and qualified for the 1995–96 UEFA Cup.

== Competitions ==
=== Overall ===
Competition	Started round	Final result	First match	Last match
1994–95 Macedonian First League	–	1st	14 August 1994	18 June 1995
1994–95 Macedonian Cup	First round	Winner	21 September 1994	25 May 1995
1994–95 UEFA Cup	Preliminary round		9 August 1994	23 August 1994

=== First League ===
==== Classification ====
Pos	Team	Pld	W	D	L	GF	GA	GD	Pts	Qualification or relegation
1	Vardar (C)	30	23	7	0	79	17	+62	76	Qualification for the UEFA Cup preliminary round
2	Sileks	30	18	6	6	66	28	+38	60	Qualification for the Cup Winners' Cup qualifying round (Note: Since Vardar, winners of 1994–95 Macedonian Football Cup, was qualified for the 1995–96 UEFA Cup, losing cup finalists Sileks earned a spot in the qualifying round of the 1995–96 UEFA Cup Winners' Cup.)
3	Sloga Jugomagnat	30	17	7	6	43	26	+17	58	
4	Pobeda	30	16	5	9	55	35	+20	53	
5	Pelister	30	15	6	9	57	40	+17	51	

Source: MacedonianFootball.com, RSSSF.org
Rules for classification: 1) Points; 2) Goal difference; 3) Goals scored; 4) Head-to-head points; 5) Head-to-head goal difference; 6) Head-to-head away goals scored (only if two teams); 7) Head-to-head goals scored; 8) Draw; 9) Play-off. (Note: Criteria 2, 3 and 8 is only used if not deciding Champion or relegation).
(C) Champions

==== Results by round ====
Round	1	2	3	4	5	6	7	8	9	10	11	12	13	14	15	16	17	18	19	20	21	22	23	24	25	26	27	28	29	30
Ground	A	H	A	H	A	H	A	H	A	H	A	A	H	A	H	H	A	H	A	H	A	H	A	H	A	H	H	A	H	A
Result	W	W	D	D	W	W	D	W	W	W	W	D	W	W	W	W	W	W	W	W	W	W	W	W	D	W	W	W	D	D
Position	1	1	1	3	2	1	2	2	1	1	1	1	1	1	1	1	1	1	1	1	1	1	1	1	1	1	1	1	1	1

Source: Competitive Matches
A = Away; H = Home; W = Win; D = Draw; L = Loss

==== Matches ====
Round	Date	Venue	Opponent	Score	Vardar Scorers
1	14 Aug	A	Ljuboten	4 – 1	
2	19 Aug	H	Balkan	3 – 0	
3	28 Aug	A	Sileks	1 – 1	
4	10 Sep	H	Osogovo	0 – 0	
5	18 Sep	A	Belasica	2 – 1	
6	24 Sep	H	Kozhuf	4 – 1	
7	2 Oct	A	Pelister	0 – 0	
8	5 Oct	H	Rudar Probishtip	7 – 1	
9	16 Oct	A	FCU 55	1 – 0	
10	22 Oct	H	Sloga Jugomagnat	2 – 0	
11	30 Oct	A	Ohrid	2 – 0	
12	6 Nov	A	Borec	1 – 1	
13	9 Nov	H	Pobeda	2 – 1	
14	23 Nov	A	Tikvesh	2 – 0	
15	26 Nov	H	Sasa	3 – 0	
16	4 Mar	H	Ljuboten	1 – 0	
17	12 Mar	A	Balkan	2 – 1	
18	19 Mar	H	Sileks	3 – 0	
19	26 Mar	A	Osogovo	3 – 0	
20	1 Apr	H	Belasica	8 – 0	
21	8 Apr	A	Kozhuf	5 – 1	
22	15 Apr	H	Pelister	6 – 3	
23	30 Apr	A	Rudar Probishtip	2 – 1	
24	6 May	H	FCU 55	4 – 1	
25	15 May	A	Sloga Jugomagnat	1 – 1	
26	20 May	H	Ohrid	3 – 1	
27	27 May	H	Borec	4 – 0	
28	31 May	A	Pobeda	2 – 0	
29	11 Jun	H	Tikvesh	1 – 1	
30	18 Jun	A	Sasa	0 – 0	

Sources: RSSSF.no, Google Groups

=== Macedonian Football Cup ===
Round	Date	Venue	Opponent	Score	Vardar Scorers
R1	21 Sep	H	Ljuboten	1 – 1 (5 – 4 p)	
R2	30 Nov	A	Varosh	3 – 0	
R2	11 Dec	H	Varosh	7 – 2	
QF	26 Feb	H	Bashkimi	15 – 0	
QF	15 Mar	A	Bashkimi	3 – 1	
SF	5 Apr	H	Gostivar	2 – 0	
SF	19 Apr	A	Gostivar	2 – 0	
Final	25 May	N	Sileks	2 – 1	Petreski (2)

Source: Google Groups

=== UEFA Cup ===
Round	Date	Venue	Opponent	Score	Vardar Scorers
PR	9 Aug	H	Békéscsabai Elõre (Hungary)	1 – 1	Miloshevski
PR	23 Aug	A (Hungary)	Békéscsabai Elõre (Hungary)	0 – 1	

== See also ==
- List of unbeaten football club seasons
