= 1993–94 FK Vardar season =

Vardar
1993–94 season
- Chairman: Filip Gjurchinovski
- Manager: Dragan Tomovski; Gjoko Hadjievski
- Stadium: Gradski stadion Skopje
- First League: 1st
- Macedonian Cup: Semi-finals
- Top goalscorer: Sasho Miloshevski; Goran Petreski (10)

The 1993–94 season was the 46th season in Vardar’s history and their second in the Macedonian First League. Their 1st place finish in the 1992–93 season meant it was their 2nd successive season playing in the First League.

In that season Vardar was won the championship for the second consecutive time and qualified for the 1994–95 UEFA Cup.

== Competitions ==
=== Overall ===
Competition	Started round	Final result	First match	Last match
1993–94 Macedonian First League	–	1st	22 August 1993	12 June 1994
1993–94 Macedonian Cup	First round	Semi-finals		

=== First League ===
==== Classification ====
Pos	Team	Pld	W	D	L	GF	GA	GD	Pts	Qualification or relegation
1	Vardar (C)	30	23	5	2	85	16	+69	51	Qualification for the UEFA Cup preliminary round
2	Sileks	30	18	8	4	56	19	+37	44	
3	Balkan	30	14	9	7	47	32	+15	37	
4	Pelister	30	14	8	8	49	31	+18	36	
5	Ljuboten (Note: Ljuboten were deducted 3 points.)	30	11	11	8	46	35	+11	30	

Source: MacedonianFootball.com, RSSSF.org
Rules for classification: 1) Points; 2) Goal difference; 3) Goals scored; 4) Head-to-head points; 5) Head-to-head goal difference; 6) Head-to-head away goals scored (only if two teams); 7) Head-to-head goals scored; 8) Draw; 9) Play-off. (Note: Criteria 2, 3 and 8 is only used if not deciding Champion or relegation).
(C) Champions

==== Results by round ====
Round	1	2	3	4	5	6	7	8	9	10	11	12	13	14	15	16	17	18	19	20	21	22	23	24	25	26	27	28	29	30
Ground	H	A	H	A	H	A	H	A	H	A	H	A	H	A	H	A	H	A	H	A	H	A	H	A	H	A	H	A	H	A
Result	D	W	W	W	W	L	W	W	W	D	W	L	W	W	W	D	W	D	W	W	W	W	W	W	W	D	W	W	W	W

Source: Competitive Matches
A = Away; H = Home; W = Win; D = Draw; L = Loss

==== Matches ====
Round	Date	Venue	Opponent	Score	Vardar Scorers
1	22 Aug	H	Ljuboten	0 – 0	
2	29 Aug	A	Pobeda	1 – 0	
3	5 Sep	H	Sloga Jugomagnat	4 – 1	
4	11 Sep	A	Karaorman	3 – 2	
5	18 Sep	H	Tikvesh	4 – 0	
6	26 Sep	A	Sileks	0 – 2	
7	3 Oct	H	Borec	3 – 0	
8	10 Oct	A	Osogovo	5 – 0	
9	17 Oct	H	Belasica	6 – 1	
10	24 Oct	A	Balkan	0 – 0	
11	31 Oct	H	Sasa	6 – 0	
12	7 Nov	A	Pelister	1 – 2	
13	14 Nov	H	Rudar Probishtip	6 – 1	
14	21 Nov	A	FCU 55	4 – 0	
15	28 Nov	H	Makedonija	4 – 0	
16	13 Mar	A	Ljuboten	0 – 0	
17	16 Mar	H	Pobeda	2 – 0	
18	20 Mar	A	Sloga Jugomagnat	0 – 0	
19	26 Mar	H	Karaorman	4 – 1	
20	3 Apr	A	Tikvesh	2 – 1	
21	10 Apr	H	Sileks	1 – 0	Miloshevski
22	17 Apr	A	Borec	2 – 0	
23	24 Apr	H	Osogovo	2 – 0	
24	1 May	A	Belasica	4 – 1	
25	8 May	H	Balkan	3 – 0	
26	18 May	A	Sasa	1 – 1	
27	22 May	H	Pelister	4 – 0	
28	29 May	A	Rudar Probishtip	3 – 0	
29	5 Jun	H	FCU 55	5 – 2	
30	12 Jun	A	Makedonija	4 – 0	

Source: Google Groups

=== Macedonian Football Cup ===
Round	Date	Venue	Opponent	Score	Vardar Scorers
R1		H	Belasica	6 – 1	
R2		H	Makedonija	5 – 0	
R2	5 Dec	A	Makedonija	2 – 0	
QF	27 Feb	H	Ljuboten	3 – 1	
QF	30 Mar	A	Ljuboten	1 – 3 (5 – 3 p)	
SF		A	Sileks	0 – 1	
SF	4 May	H	Sileks	1 – 1	

Source: Google Groups
