= List of football stadiums in North Macedonia =

The following is a list of football stadiums in North Macedonia, ranked in order of capacity, with the minimum capacity being 1,000. Stadiums in bold are used in the Macedonian First Football League.

== Current stadiums ==
#	Image	Stadium	Capacity	City	Home team	Opened	UEFA rank
1		**Toše Proeski Arena**	36,460	Skopje	Rabotnički, Vardar	1947	4/4 stars
2		Stadion Goce Delčev	15,000	Prilep	Pobeda	1941	
3		**Ecolog Arena**	15,000	Tetovo	Shkëndija	1981	
4		Petar Miloševski Football Stadium	8,547	Bitola	Pelister	1937	
5		Stadion Blagoj Istatov	9,200	Strumica	Belasica, Tiverija	1950	
6		**Gradski stadion Kavadarci**	9,000	Kavadarci	Tikveš	1950	
7		**Gradski stadion Štip**	8,000	Štip	Bregalnica Štip		
8		Gradski stadion Veles	6,000	Veles	Borec		
9		Gradski stadion Kičevo	5,000	Kičevo	Napredok		
10		Stadion Nikola Mantov	5,000	Kočani	Osogovo	1980	
11		Gradski stadion Makedonska Kamenica	5,000	M. Kamenica	Sasa	1968	
12		**Gradski stadion Kratovo**	5,000	Kratovo	Sileks		
13		**Cair Stadium**	6,000	Skopje	Shkupi, Shkëndija 77	1927	
14		Gradski stadion Goce Delčev	4,000	Delčevo	Bregalnica Delčevo		
15		Gradski stadion Probištip	4,000	Probištip	Rudar Probištip		
16		SRC Biljanini Izvori	3,980	Ohrid	Ohrid, Voska Sport	1978	
17		**KF Bashkimi Stadium**	3,500	Kumanovo	Bashkimi	1991	
18		**Stadion Boris Trajkovski**	3,000	Skopje	Gostivar, Madžari Solidarnost		
19		Stadion Gjorče Petrov	3,000	Skopje	Makedonija GP	1971	
20		Stadion Železarnica	3,000	Skopje	Metalurg, Skopje		
21		Vëllazërimi Arena	3,000	Kičevo	Vëllazërimi 77		
22		Stadion Bogovinje	2,500	Bogovinje	Drita		
		Gradski stadion Gevgelija	2,500	Gevgelija	Kožuf		
		Training Centre Petar Miloševski	2,500	Skopje	N/A	2013	
25		Stadion Zoran Paunov	2,000	Veles	Borec		
		Gradski stadion Kumanovo	2,000	Kumanovo	Goblen, Kumanovo		
		Stadion Cementarnica	2,000	Skopje	N/A		
		Gradski stadion Vinica	2,000	Vinica	Sloga 1934 Vinica		
		Stadion Mogila	2,000	Prilep	Korzo		
30		Stadion Gorno Lisiče	1,500	Skopje	Euromilk Gorno Lisiče		
		Gradski stadion Negotino	1,500	Negotino	Vardar Negotino		
		Gradski stadion Resen	1,500	Resen	Prespa		
		Stadion Kukuš	1,500	Turnovo	Turnovo		
34		**Gradski stadion Gostivar**	1,000	Gostivar	Arsimi		
		Sports Center Pandev	1,000	Strumica	AP Brera		
36		**Stadion Gradska Plaža**	800	Struga	Karaorman, FC Struga	1970	

== Stadiums under construction ==
- **City Park Kavadarci** 10.000
- **Goce Delcev Prilep** 16.000
- **City Park Shtip** 10.000
- **FFM Center** 12.000

== See also ==
- List of European stadiums by capacity
- List of association football stadiums by capacity
