= 1992–93 FK Vardar season =

Vardar
1992–93 season
- Chairman: Filip Gjurchinovski
- Manager: Gjoko Hadjievski
- Stadium: Gradski stadion Skopje
- First League: 1st
- Macedonian Cup: Winner
- Top goalscorer: Saša Ćirić (36)

The 1992–93 season was the 45th season in Vardar’s history and their first in the Macedonian First League.

In that season Vardar was won the championship for the first time without a loss and a first Macedonian Cup.

== Competitions ==
=== Overall ===
| Competition | Started round | Final result | First match | Last match |
|---|---|---|---|---|
| 1992–93 Macedonian First League | – | 1st | 23 August 1992 | 13 June 1993 |
| 1992–93 Macedonian Cup | Semi-finals | Winner | 28 April 1993 | 23 May 1993 |

=== First League ===
==== Classification ====
| Pos | Team | Pld | W | D | L | GF | GA | GD | Pts | Qualification or relegation |
|---|---|---|---|---|---|---|---|---|---|---|
| 1 | Vardar (C) | 34 | 27 | 7 | 0 | 119 | 16 | +103 | 61 | Champions |
| 2 | Sileks | 34 | 17 | 6 | 11 | 72 | 50 | +22 | 40 | |
| 3 | Balkan | 34 | 15 | 10 | 9 | 36 | 21 | +15 | 40 | |
| 4 | Pelister | 34 | 14 | 8 | 12 | 47 | 36 | +11 | 36 | |
| 5 | Sasa | 34 | 14 | 8 | 12 | 41 | 44 | −3 | 36 | |

Source: MacedonianFootball.com, RSSSF.org
Rules for classification: 1) Points; 2) Goal difference; 3) Goals scored; 4) Head-to-head points; 5) Head-to-head goal difference; 6) Head-to-head away goals scored (only if two teams); 7) Head-to-head goals scored; 8) Draw; 9) Play-off. (Note: Criteria 2, 3 and 8 is only used if not deciding Champion or relegation).
(C) Champions

==== Results by round ====
| Round | 1 | 2 | 3 | 4 | 5 | 6 | 7 | 8 | 9 | 10 | 11 | 12 | 13 | 14 | 15 | 16 | 17 | 18 | 19 | 20 | 21 | 22 | 23 | 24 | 25 | 26 | 27 | 28 | 29 | 30 | 31 | 32 | 33 | 34 |
|---|---|---|---|---|---|---|---|---|---|---|---|---|---|---|---|---|---|---|---|---|---|---|---|---|---|---|---|---|---|---|---|---|---|---|
| Ground | A | H | A | H | A | H | A | H | A | A | H | A | H | A | H | A | H | H | A | H | A | H | A | H | A | H | H | A | H | A | H | A | H | A |
| Result | D | W | W | W | W | W | W | W | W | D | W | D | W | W | W | W | D | W | W | W | W | D | D | W | W | W | W | W | W | D | W | W | W | W |

Source: Competitive Matches
A = Away; H = Home; W = Win; D = Draw; L = Loss

==== Matches ====
| Round | Date | Venue | Opponent | Score | Vardar Scorers |
|---|---|---|---|---|---|
| 1 | 23 Aug | A | Pobeda | 1 – 1 | |
| 2 | 29 Aug | H | Metalurg | 3 – 0 | |
| 3 | 6 Sep | A | Sasa | 5 – 2 | |
| 4 | 12 Sep | H | Osogovo | 8 – 0 | |
| 5 | 19 Sep | A | Balkan | 3 – 1 | |
| 6 | 23 Sep | H | Bregalnica Shtip | 3 – 0 | |
| 7 | 26 Sep | A | Teteks | 4 – 1 | |
| 8 | 3 Oct | H | FCU 55 | 1 – 1 | |
| 9 | 11 Oct | A | Sileks | 3 – 1 | |
| 10 | 17 Oct | A | Sloga Jugomagnat | 1 – 1 | |
| 11 | 21 Oct | H | Rudar Probishtip | 3 – 1 | |
| 12 | 25 Oct | A | Belasica | 1 – 1 | |
| 13 | 30 Oct | H | Tikvesh | 7 – 2 | |
| 14 | 8 Nov | A | Vardarski | 7 – 1 | |
| 15 | 14 Nov | H | Borec | 6 – 0 | |
| 16 | 21 Nov | A | Makedonija | 4 – 0 | |
| 17 | 28 Nov | H | Pelister | 1 – 1 | |
| 18 | 13 Mar | H | Pobeda | 4 – 0 | |
| 19 | 21 Mar | A | Metalurg | 3 – 0 | |
| 20 | 27 Mar | H | Sasa | 5 – 0 | |
| 21 | 4 Apr | A | Osogovo | 2 – 0 | |
| 22 | 7 Apr | H | Balkan | 1 – 1 | |
| 23 | 11 Apr | A | Bregalnica Shtip | 0 – 0 | |
| 24 | 17 Apr | H | Teteks | 7 – 1 | |
| 25 | 25 Apr | A | FCU 55 | 1 – 0 | |
| 26 | 1 May | H | Sileks | 2 – 0 | |
| 27 | 5 May | H | Sloga Jugomagnat | 1 – 0 | |
| 28 | 9 May | A | Rudar Probishtip | 4 – 0 | |
| 29 | 15 May | H | Belasica | 3 – 0 | |
| 30 | 26 May | A | Tikvesh | 1 – 1 | |
| 31 | 30 May | H | Vardarski | 11 – 0 | |
| 32 | 6 Jun | A | Borec | 1 – 0 | |
| 33 | 9 Jun | H | Makedonija | 4 – 0 | |
| 34 | 13 Jun | A | Pelister | 3 – 0^{1} | |

^{1} Match abandoned before the kick-off due to the crowd trouble when Čkembari burned seats, collapsed the protective fence and clashed with the police. Vardar were awarded a 0–3 win.

Source: Google Groups

=== Macedonian Football Cup ===
| Round | Date | Venue | Opponent | Score | Vardar Scorers |
|---|---|---|---|---|---|
| SF | 28 Apr | A | Pobeda | 1 – 0 | |
| SF | 12 May | H | Pobeda | 3 – 0 | |
| Final | 23 May | N | Pelister | 1 – 0 | Savov |

Source: Google Groups

== See also ==
- List of unbeaten football club seasons
