= 1993–94 Macedonian First Football League =

Macedonian First League
- Season: 1993–94
- Dates: 22 August 1993 – 12 June 1994
- Champions: Vardar; 2nd Macedonian title 3rd domestic title
- Relegated: Karaorman; Makedonija
- UEFA Cup: Vardar
- Matches: 240
- Goals: 637 (2.65 per match)
- Top goalscorer: Zoran Boshkovski (21 goals)
- Biggest home win: Sileks 8–0 Karaorman (24 October 1993)
- Biggest away win: Osogovo 0–5 Vardar (10 October 1993)
- Highest scoring: Sileks 8–0 Karaorman (24 October 1993); Pobeda 6–2 Rudar (28 November 1993); Ljuboten 4–4 Borec (24 April 1994)

The 1993–94 Macedonian First League was the 2nd season of the Macedonian First Football League, the highest football league of Macedonia. The first matches of the season were played on 22 August 1993 and the last on 12 June 1994. Vardar defended their championship title, having won their second title in a row.

== Promotion and relegation ==
At the start of the 1993–94 season

Promoted from 1992–93 Second League

- Ljuboten (winners)
- Karaorman (runners-up)

Relegated to 1993–94 Second League

- Metalurg Skopje (15th)
- Bregalnica Shtip (16th)
- Teteks (17th)
- Vardarski (18th)

At the end of the 1993–94 season

Promoted from 1993–94 Second League

- Ohrid (Winners; West)
- Kozhuf Vinojug (Winners; East)

Relegated to 1994–95 Second League

- Karaorman (15th)^{1}
- Makedonija Skopje (16th)

1 Karaorman was relegated from the First League after a loss in a relegation tie-breaker match against Borec.

== Participating teams ==
Location of teams in 1993–94 Macedonian First League

Club	City	Stadium
Balkan Stokokomerc	Skopje	Chair Stadium
Belasica	Strumica	Stadion Mladost
Borec	Titov Veles	Gradski stadion Titov Veles
FCU Skopje	Skopje	Stadion Cementarnica
Karaorman	Struga	Stadion Gradska Plazha
Ljuboten	Tetovo	Gradski stadion Tetovo
Makedonija	Skopje	Stadion Gjorche Petrov
Osogovo	Kochani	Stadion Nikola Mantov
Pelister	Bitola	Stadion Tumbe Kafe
Pobeda Vitaminka	Prilep	Stadion Goce Delchev
Rudar	Probishtip	Gradski stadion Probishtip
Sasa	Makedonska Kamenica	Gradski stadion Makedonska Kamenica
Sileks	Kratovo	Stadion Sileks
Sloga Jugomagnat	Skopje	Chair Stadium
Tikvesh	Kavadarci	Gradski stadion Kavadarci
Vardar	Skopje	Gradski stadion Skopje

== League table ==
Pos	Team	Pld	W	D	L	GF	GA	GD	Pts	Qualification or relegation
1	Vardar (C)	30	23	5	2	85	16	+69	51	Qualification for the UEFA Cup preliminary round
2	Sileks	30	18	8	4	56	19	+37	44	
3	Balkan	30	14	9	7	47	32	+15	37	
4	Pelister	30	14	8	8	49	31	+18	36	
5	Ljuboten (Note: Ljuboten were deducted 3 points.)	30	11	11	8	46	35	+11	30	
6	Pobeda	30	11	8	11	38	37	+1	30	
7	Sasa	30	9	12	9	38	41	−3	30	
8	Sloga Jugomagnat	30	7	13	10	29	30	−1	27	
9	Osogovo	30	9	9	12	33	44	−11	27	
10	FCU 55	30	9	8	13	36	40	−4	26	
11	Tikvesh	30	9	8	13	31	42	−11	26	
12	Belasica	30	7	12	11	35	48	−13	26	
13	Rudar Probishtip	30	8	10	12	29	49	−20	26	
14	Borec (Note: Borec were deducted 3 points.)	30	9	9	12	31	43	−12	24	
15	Karaorman (R)	30	9	6	15	37	75	−38	24	Relegation to the Macedonian Second League (Note: Borec and Karaorman were finished the season level on points so the Football Federation of Macedonia decided to organise a tie-breaker game to determine which side will be relegated to the Macedonian Second League.)
16	Makedonija (R)	30	2	6	22	17	55	−38	10	Relegation to the Macedonian Second League

Source: MacedonianFootball.com, RSSSF.org
Rules for classification: 1) Points; 2) Goal difference; 3) Goals scored; 4) Head-to-head points; 5) Head-to-head goal difference; 6) Head-to-head away goals scored (only if two teams); 7) Head-to-head goals scored; 8) Draw; 9) Play-off. (Note: Criteria 2, 3 and 8 is only used if not deciding Champion or relegation).
(C) Champions; (R) Relegated

== Results ==
Home \ Away	BAL	BEL	BOR	FCU	KAR	LJU	MGP	OSO	PEL	POB	RUD	SAS	SIL	SLO	TIK	VAR
Balkan	—	2–0	2–1	1–2	5–1	1–0	4–1	4–1	0–3	3–0	2–1	2–2	2–0	3–0	2–1	0–0
Belasica	1–1	—	4–1	2–2	6–0	1–1	2–0	0–0	1–1	2–1	3–2	0–0	2–2	1–1	1–0	1–4
Borec	1–1	0–0	—	2–1	3–0	1–1	1–0	1–0	1–0	0–0	1–1	1–2	3–1	0–0	3–0	0–2
FCU 55	0–0	0–1	1–1	—	5–1	3–1	1–0	5–0	1–1	0–1	1–0	2–0	0–1	0–0	3–0	0–4
Karaorman	5–2	2–1	3–0	2–1	—	1–1	2–1	1–1	0–0	2–1	4–3	1–1	1–1	1–0	2–1	2–3
Ljuboten	1–1	2–0	4–4	2–0	3–1	—	5–1	2–0	5–0	1–0	1–1	4–2	0–0	1–0	2–1	1–1
Makedonija	2–4	0–0	0–1	0–1	3–0	1–2	—	1–3	0–2	1–1	1–0	2–2	0–0	1–3	0–1	0–4
Osogovo	2–1	1–0	1–2	1–1	3–0	3–0	1–1	—	2–1	0–1	0–0	0–0	0–2	5–2	2–1	0–5
Pelister	0–1	3–0	4–2	1–1	6–1	2–1	2–0	3–0	—	2–0	3–0	1–0	1–0	5–1	1–1	2–1
Pobeda	0–0	4–0	4–1	1–0	3–2	2–1	3–0	0–0	2–2	—	6–2	2–1	0–3 (Note: The match was abandoned in the 66th minute after a brawl between the two sides as Pobeda were asking for a penalty kick. Later, the match was awarded to Sileks.)	1–1	0–0	0–1
Rudar Probishtip	2–1	2–1	0–0	1–0	0–0	1–1	2–1	0–4	0–0	2–1	—	1–1	0–2	1–0	2–0	0–3
Sasa	0–0	1–1	2–0	3–1	3–0	3–2	2–0	0–0	2–1	3–1	2–2	—	0–1	0–1	5–0	1–1
Sileks	2–1	6–1	2–0	2–1	8–0	2–0	1–0	3–3	2–1	3–0	0–0	5–0	—	1–0	2–1	2–0
Sloga Jugomagnat	0–1	1–1	2–0	5–0	4–1	0–0	0–0	2–0	0–0	0–1	3–0	0–0	0–0	—	1–1	0–0
Tikvesh	0–0	2–1	1–0	1–1	2–0	2–1	1–0	3–0	2–1	2–2	1–2	3–0	1–1	1–1	—	1–2
Vardar	3–0	6–1	3–0	5–2	4–1	0–0	4–0	2–0	4–0	2–0	6–1	6–0	1–0	4–1	4–0	—

Source: MacedonianFootball.com
Legend: Blue = home team win; Yellow = draw; Red = away team win.

== Relegation tie-breaker ==
19 June 1994
17:00 CEST

Borec	1–1 (a.e.t.)	Karaorman
Georgievski 79' (pen.)		Shakiri 87'
Penalties
Jovashev (penalty missed); Nedeljković (penalty scored); Arizanov (penalty missed); Trajkov (penalty scored); Georgievski (penalty scored)	3–2	(penalty scored) Cvetanovski; (penalty missed) Nicheski; (penalty missed) Negrieski; (penalty scored) Shakiri; (penalty missed) Ljatkoski

Gradski stadion, Skopje
Referee: Sasho Lazarevski (Kumanovo)

Borec was stayed and Karaorman was relegated to the Second League.

== Top goalscorers ==
Rank	Player	Club	Goals
1	(North Macedonia) Zoran Boshkovski	Sileks	21

== See also ==
- 1993–94 Macedonian Football Cup
- 1993–94 Macedonian Second Football League
