= 1995–96 Macedonian First Football League =

Macedonian First League
- Season: 1995–96
- Dates: 18 August 1995 – 9 June 1996
- Champions: Sileks; 1st domestic title
- Relegated: Ohrid; Osogovo; Ljuboten
- UEFA Cup: Sileks; Vardar
- Cup Winners' Cup: Sloga Jugomagnat
- Matches: 210
- Goals: 615 (2.93 per match)
- Top goalscorer: Zoran Boshkovski (20 goals)
- Biggest home win: Sileks 10–0 Ljuboten (10 October 1995)
- Biggest away win: Rudar 0–5 Vardar (19 November 1995)
- Highest scoring: Sileks 10–0 Ljuboten (10 October 1995)

The 1995–96 Macedonian First League was the 4th season of the Macedonian First Football League, the highest football league of Macedonia. The first match of the season is played on 18 August 1995 and the last on 9 June 1996. Vardar were the defending champions, having won their third title in a row. The 1995-96 champions were FK Sileks who had won their first title.

== Promotion and relegation ==
At the start of the 1995–96 season

Promoted from 1994–95 Second League

- Makedonija Skopje (Winners; West)
- Pobeda Valandovo (Winners; East)^{1}

Relegated to 1995–96 Second League

- Borec (15th)
- Kozhuf Vinojug (16th)

At the end of the 1995–96 season

Promoted from 1995–96 Second League

- Shkëndija (Winners; West)
- Bregalnica Shtip (Winners; East)

Relegated to 1996–97 Second League

- Ohrid (13th)
- Osogovo (14th)
- Ljuboten (15th)

1 Pobeda Valandovo was initially promoted, but was expelled from the First League for unknown reasons.

== Participating teams ==
Location of teams in 1995–96 Macedonian First League

Club	City	Stadium
Balkan BISI	Skopje	Chair Stadium
Belasica	Strumica	Stadion Mladost
FCU Skopje	Skopje	Stadion Cementarnica
Ljuboten	Tetovo	Gradski stadion Tetovo
Makedonija	Skopje	Stadion Gjorche Petrov
Ohrid	Ohrid	SRC Biljanini Izvori
Osogovo	Kochani	Stadion Nikola Mantov
Pelister	Bitola	Stadion Tumbe Kafe
Pobeda	Prilep	Stadion Goce Delchev
Rudar	Probishtip	Gradski stadion Probishtip
Sasa	Makedonska Kamenica	Gradski stadion Makedonska Kamenica
Sileks	Kratovo	Stadion Sileks
Sloga Jugomagnat	Skopje	Çair Stadium
Tikvesh	Kavadarci	Gradski stadion Kavadarci
Vardar	Skopje	Gradski stadion Skopje

== League table ==
Pos	Team	Pld	W	D	L	GF	GA	GD	Pts	Qualification or relegation
1	Sileks (C)	28	21	7	0	74	20	+54	70	Qualification for the UEFA Cup preliminary round
2	Sloga Jugomagnat	28	18	4	6	48	19	+29	58	Qualification for the Cup Winners' Cup qualifying round
3	Vardar	28	17	6	5	60	22	+38	57	Qualification for the UEFA Cup preliminary round
4	Pobeda	28	12	8	8	52	34	+18	44	
5	Pelister	28	13	4	11	51	40	+11	43	
6	Sasa	28	10	7	11	36	38	−2	37	
7	Makedonija	28	10	7	11	35	37	−2	37	
8	Balkan	28	9	7	12	31	39	−8	34	
9	Belasica	28	9	6	13	34	38	−4	33	
10	Tikvesh	28	8	8	12	37	46	−9	32	
11	FCU 55	28	9	5	14	36	52	−16	32	
12	Rudar Probishtip	28	9	5	14	31	48	−17	32	
13	Ohrid (R)	28	8	7	13	29	39	−10	31	Relegation to the Macedonian Second League
14	Osogovo (R)	28	6	8	14	31	53	−22	26	Relegation to the Macedonian Second League
15	Ljuboten (R)	28	6	1	21	27	87	−60	19	Relegation to the Macedonian Second League

Source: MacedonianFootball.com, RSSSF.org
Rules for classification: 1) Points; 2) Goal difference; 3) Goals scored; 4) Head-to-head points; 5) Head-to-head goal difference; 6) Head-to-head away goals scored (only if two teams); 7) Head-to-head goals scored; 8) Draw; 9) Play-off. (Note: Criteria 2, 3 and 8 is only used if not deciding Champion, teams for UEFA competitions or relegation).
(C) Champions; (R) Relegated

== Results ==
Home \ Away	BAL	BEL	FCU	LJU	MGP	OHR	OSO	PEL	POB	RUD	SAS	SIL	SLO	TIK	VAR
Balkan	—	1–0	3–0	2–1	1–1	1–1	3–0	1–1	2–5	2–0	0–2	0–2	1–3	3–0	0–0
Belasica	2–2	—	2–0	2–0	3–0	2–0	4–1	0–0	1–3	2–0	4–3	0–1	0–1	0–0	2–1
FCU 55	1–0	4–2	—	4–0	3–1	1–1	3–0	1–3	1–1	1–0	1–0	2–2	1–2	2–0	1–2
Ljuboten	0–1	1–0	1–3	—	2–3	2–1	4–3	4–3	1–3	3–2	1–2	0–3 (Note: The match was abandoned in the 90th minute with a score of 0–0 as the home team players fiercely protested for a penalty kick awarded for Sileks. Later, the match was awarded to Sileks.)	0–4	2–1	0–2
Makedonija	0–1	2–0	3–1	2–0	—	2–0	1–1	4–0	2–1	2–1	3–0	0–0	1–0	2–3	1–2
Ohrid	0–0	1–1	3–1	2–1	0–0	—	1–0	0–1	1–1	2–1	2–0	1–2	1–0	6–2	1–0
Osogovo	0–1	1–1	1–1	6–2	1–0	1–1	—	2–0	2–2	0–1	0–2	1–2	1–0	3–0	1–0
Pelister	3–1	2–1	6–0	7–0	3–0	1–0	1–1	—	2–3	4–0	2–0	0–1	3–0	5–1	2–1
Pobeda	3–0	0–1	6–1	3–0 (Note: Match awarded to Pobeda because Ljuboten came with only 6 players and the match never kicked-off.)	3–1	2–0	2–2	2–0	—	1–0	2–0	1–2	1–0	3–0	1–1
Rudar Probishtip	2–1	2–1	1–0	2–2	1–1	3–0	1–0	2–1	4–3	—	0–1	2–2	0–3	3–2	0–5
Sasa	3–1	1–0	1–1	7–0	3–1	2–1	1–1	1–0	1–1	0–0	—	0–2	1–2	2–2	1–1
Sileks	4–2	3–0	3–1	10–0	2–0	7–1	5–0	3–0	2–1	3–2	5–1	—	2–0	1–0	2–2
Sloga Jugomagnat	1–0	5–2	3–0	3–0	1–1	1–0	4–0	1–1	1–0	3–0	1–0	0–0	—	5–1	1–0
Tikvesh	1–1	0–0	3–0	4–0	1–0	2–1	4–0	3–0	3–2	0–0	0–0	1–1	1–2	—	0–1
Vardar	3–0	3–1	2–1	2–0	1–1	2–1	6–0	7–0	1–0	3–1	4–1	2–2	1–0	5–1	—

Source: MacedonianFootball.com
Legend: Blue = home team win; Yellow = draw; Red = away team win.

== Top goalscorers ==
Rank	Player	Club	Goals
1	(North Macedonia) Zoran Boshkovski	Sileks	20

== See also ==
- 1995–96 Macedonian Football Cup
- 1995–96 Macedonian Second Football League
