= 1997–98 Macedonian First Football League =

Macedonian First League
- Season: 1997–98
- Dates: 10 August 1997 – 31 May 1998
- Champions: Sileks; 3rd domestic title
- Relegated: Belasica; Bregalnica
- Champions League: Sileks
- Cup Winners' Cup: Vardar
- UEFA Cup: Sloga Jugomagnat
- Intertoto Cup: Makedonija
- Matches: 169
- Goals: 382 (2.26 per match)
- Top goalscorer: Toni Atanasov (12 goals)
- Biggest home win: Makedonija 7–1 Bregalnica (24 August 1997)
- Biggest away win: Belasica 0–4 Sileks (4 October 1997)
- Highest scoring: Makedonija 7–1 Bregalnica (24 August 1997)

The 1997–98 Macedonian First League was the 6th season of the Macedonian First Football League, the highest football league of Macedonia. The first matches of the season were played on 10 August 1997 and the last on 31 May 1998. Sileks defended their championship title, having won their third title in a row.

== Promotion and relegation ==
At the start of the 1997–98 season

Promoted from 1996–97 Second League

- Skopje (Winners; West)
- Borec (Winners; East)

Relegated to 1997–98 Second League

- Shkëndija (13th)
- Rudar Probishtip (14th)

At the end of the 1997–98 season

Promoted from 1997–98 Second League

- Rabotnichki Kometal (Winners; West)
- Osogovo (Winners; East)

Relegated to 1998–99 Second League

- Belasica (13th)
- Bregalnica Shtip (14th)^{1}

1 Bregalnica Shtip was removed from the league after the round 19, due to the absence in a match against Sloga Jugomagnat. Their matches from round 14 were annulled.

== Participating teams ==
Location of teams in 1997–98 Macedonian First League

Club	City	Stadium
Balkan BISI	Skopje	Chair Stadium
Belasica	Strumica	Stadion Mladost
Borec MHK	Veles	Gradski stadion Veles
Bregalnica	Shtip	Gradski stadion Shtip
Cementarnica 55	Skopje	Stadion Cementarnica
Makedonija	Skopje	Stadion Gjorche Petrov
Pelister	Bitola	Stadion Tumbe Kafe
Pobeda	Prilep	Stadion Goce Delchev
Sasa	Makedonska Kamenica	Gradski stadion Makedonska Kamenica
Sileks	Kratovo	Stadion Sileks
Skopje	Skopje	Stadion Zhelezarnica
Sloga Jugomagnat	Skopje	Chair Stadium
Tikvesh	Kavadarci	Gradski stadion Kavadarci
Vardar	Skopje	Gradski stadion Skopje

== League table ==
Pos	Team	Pld	W	D	L	GF	GA	GD	Pts	Qualification or relegation
1	Sileks (C)	25	15	3	7	40	21	+19	48	Qualification for the Champions League first qualifying round
2	Sloga Jugomagnat	25	12	7	6	25	16	+9	43	Qualification for the UEFA Cup first qualifying round
3	Makedonija	25	12	6	7	34	21	+13	42	Qualification for the Intertoto Cup first round
4	Vardar	25	12	5	8	34	25	+9	41	Qualification for the Cup Winners' Cup qualifying round
5	Pobeda	25	11	6	8	29	21	+8	39	
6	Pelister	25	10	7	8	31	24	+7	37	
7	Borec	25	9	6	10	28	30	−2	33	
8	Balkan	25	8	7	10	20	21	−1	31	
9	Cementarnica 55	25	9	3	13	28	32	−4	30	
10	Skopje	25	9	3	13	31	45	−14	30	
11	Tikvesh	25	7	8	10	23	27	−4	29	
12	Sasa	25	8	5	12	21	32	−11	29	
13	Belasica (R)	25	8	4	13	25	35	−10	28	Relegation to the Macedonian Second League
14	Bregalnica Shtip (Note: Bregalnica Shtip were withdraw from First League after 18th round due to unknown reasons. Their matches from 14th round onwards were annulled.) (R)	13	4	0	9	13	32	−19	12	Relegation to the Macedonian Second League

Source: MacedonianFootball.com, RSSSF.org
Rules for classification: 1) Points; 2) Goal difference; 3) Goals scored; 4) Head-to-head points; 5) Head-to-head goal difference; 6) Head-to-head away goals scored (only if two teams); 7) Head-to-head goals scored; 8) Draw; 9) Play-off. (Note: Criteria 2, 3 and 8 is only used if not deciding Champion, teams for UEFA competitions or relegation).
(C) Champions; (R) Relegated

== Results ==
Home \ Away	BAL	BEL	BOR	BRE	CEM	MGP	PEL	POB	SAS	SIL	SKO	SLO	TIK	VAR
Balkan	—	3–0	1–0	2–0	2–0	0–0	0–0	0–0	3–0	2–0	0–0	2–0	1–0	0–1
Belasica	0–0	—	1–1	—	1–0	3–0	2–0	2–0	1–0	0–4	4–1	0–2	0–1	2–1
Borec	2–0	2–1	—	3–1	0–0	3–0	3–1	3–0	1–0	0–1	2–1	2–2	1–1	0–0
Bregalnica Shtip	—	3–1	—	—	1–2	1–0 (Note: Matches annulled after a withdrawn of Bregalnica Štip.)	0–2	1–0	—	0–3	0–3	—	2–1	—
Cementarnica 55	2–1	3–2	3–0	3–0	—	2–2	2–3	0–2	1–1	0–1	2–0	1–0	4–1	3–0
Makedonija	2–0	1–0	0–2	7–1	1–0	—	0–0	3–0	3–1	1–0	3–0	1–2	2–0	0–0
Pelister	1–1	3–0	4–0	4–0	0–3	0–1	—	2–0	2–0	1–3	3–0	0–0	1–0	3–2
Pobeda	3–0	2–1	3–0	—	2–0	1–0	0–0	—	0–0	1–2	5–2	3–0	2–1	2–0
Sasa	2–0	1–2	1–0	1–0	1–0	2–0	0–0	1–1	—	2–1	2–0	1–0	1–1	2–0
Sileks	3–0	0–0	1–1	2–1	1–0	3–1	2–1	0–1	2–0	—	2–3	3–0	4–2	2–0
Skopje	1–0	3–2	3–2	—	3–0	1–4	2–1	0–0	4–1	0–2	—	0–1	2–1	1–3
Sloga Jugomagnat	1–0	2–0	2–0	5–0	2–0	0–0	1–0	0–0	1–0	2–1	2–1	—	0–0	0–0
Tikvesh	1–1	0–0	2–0	—	1–0	0–0	1–2	1–0	2–1	0–0	3–0	0–0	—	3–2
Vardar	2–1	2–0	1–0	4–1	4–0	0–2	1–1	2–1	5–1	2–0	0–0	1–0	1–0	—

Source: RSSSF.org
Legend: Blue = home team win; Yellow = draw; Red = away team win.

== Top goalscorers ==
Rank	Player	Club	Goals
1	(North Macedonia) Toni Atanasov	Belasica	12
2	(North Macedonia) Vlado Trifunov	Makedonija	11
3	(North Macedonia) Ilcho Borov	Pobeda	10
3	(Brazil) Fernando Jefferson	Pelister	10

Source: Top15goalscorers.blogspot.com

== See also ==
- 1997–98 Macedonian Football Cup
- 1997–98 Macedonian Second Football League
