= 1996–97 Macedonian First Football League =

Macedonian First League
- Season: 1996–97
- Dates: 17 August 1996 – 1 June 1997
- Champions: Sileks; 2nd domestic title
- Relegated: Shkëndija; Rudar
- Champions League: Sileks
- Cup Winners' Cup: Sloga Jugomagnat
- UEFA Cup: Pobeda
- Matches: 182
- Goals: 522 (2.87 per match)
- Top goalscorer: Miroslav Gjokić (16 goals)
- Biggest home win: Sileks 17–1 Rudar (18 May 1997)
- Biggest away win: Rudar 1–7 Tikvesh (11 May 1997)
- Highest scoring: Sileks 17–1 Rudar (18 May 1997)

The 1996–97 Macedonian First League was the 5th season of the Macedonian First Football League, the highest football league of Macedonia. The first matches of the season were played on 17 August 1996 and the last on 1 June 1997. Sileks defended their championship title, having won their second title in a row.

== Promotion and relegation ==
At the start of the 1996–97 season

Promoted from 1995–96 Second League

- Shkëndija (Winners; West)
- Bregalnica Shtip (Winners; East)

Relegated to 1996–97 Second League

- Ohrid (13th)
- Osogovo (14th)
- Ljuboten (15th)

At the end of the 1996–97 season

Promoted from 1996–97 Second League

- Skopje (Winners; West)
- Borec (Winners; East)

Relegated to 1997–98 Second League

- Shkëndija (13th)
- Rudar Probishtip (14th)

== Participating teams ==
Location of teams in 1996–97 Macedonian First League

Club	City	Stadium
Balkan BISI	Skopje	Chair Stadium
Belasica	Strumica	Stadion Mladost
Bregalnica	Shtip	Gradski stadion Shtip
Cementarnica 55	Skopje	Stadion Cementarnica
Makedonija	Skopje	Stadion Gjorche Petrov
Pelister	Bitola	Stadion Tumbe Kafe
Pobeda	Prilep	Stadion Goce Delchev
Rudar	Probishtip	Gradski stadion Probishtip
Sasa	Makedonska Kamenica	Gradski stadion Makedonska Kamenica
Shkëndija	Tetovo	Gradski stadion Tetovo
Sileks	Kratovo	Stadion Sileks
Sloga Jugomagnat	Skopje	Chair Stadium
Tikvesh	Kavadarci	Gradski stadion Kavadarci
Vardar	Skopje	Gradski stadion Skopje

== League table ==
Pos	Team	Pld	W	D	L	GF	GA	GD	Pts	Qualification or relegation
1	Sileks (C)	26	19	5	2	83	23	+60	62	Qualification for the Champions League first qualifying round
2	Pobeda	26	17	3	6	55	26	+29	54	Qualification for the UEFA Cup first qualifying round
3	Sloga Jugomagnat	26	13	7	6	42	25	+17	46	Qualification for the Cup Winners' Cup qualifying round (Note: Since Sileks, winners of 1996–97 Macedonian Football Cup, was qualified for the 1997–98 UEFA Champions League, losing cup finalists Sloga Jugomagnat earned a spot in the qualifying round of the 1997–98 UEFA Cup Winners' Cup.)
4	Vardar (Note: Vardar were deducted 3 points and fined 48,000 German marks for fielding a suspended player in the match against Sloga Jugomagnat in the 1st round.)	26	11	10	5	32	15	+17	40	
5	Sasa	26	10	7	9	36	31	+5	37	
6	Bregalnica Shtip	26	10	5	11	30	33	−3	35	
7	Makedonija	26	10	4	12	38	30	+8	34	
8	Balkan	26	8	9	9	31	26	+5	33	
9	Pelister	26	9	6	11	36	35	+1	33	
10	Belasica	26	9	6	11	32	41	−9	33	
11	Tikvesh	26	8	8	10	33	39	−6	32	
12	Cementarnica 55	26	8	5	13	32	39	−7	29 (Note: Head-to-head record: Shkëndija–Cementarnica 55 2–1, Cementarnica 55–Shkëndija 3–1.)	
13	Shkëndija (R)	26	8	5	13	27	48	−21	29	Relegation to the Macedonian Second League
14	Rudar Probishtip (R)	26	1	2	23	15	111	−96	5	Relegation to the Macedonian Second League

Source: MacedonianFootball.com, RSSSF.org
Rules for classification: 1) Points; 2) Goal difference; 3) Goals scored; 4) Head-to-head points; 5) Head-to-head goal difference; 6) Head-to-head away goals scored (only if two teams); 7) Head-to-head goals scored; 8) Draw; 9) Play-off. (Note: Criteria 2, 3 and 8 is only used if not deciding Champion, teams for UEFA competitions or relegation).
(C) Champions; (R) Relegated

== Results ==
Home \ Away	BAL	BEL	BRE	CEM	MGP	PEL	POB	RUD	SAS	SKE	SIL	SLO	TIK	VAR
Balkan	—	4–1	3–0	2–0	2–1	2–2	1–2	2–1	0–0	0–0	4–1	1–0	2–4	0–0
Belasica	2–1	—	1–1	3–1	1–0	1–1	1–2	4–0	1–0	3–0	0–0	1–1	1–1	1–0
Bregalnica Shtip	2–1	2–1	—	2–0	2–1	1–0	0–1	8–0	0–0	3–0	1–1	0–2	1–0	1–1
Cementarnica 55	1–1	1–0	2–0	—	1–1	1–2	1–3	3–2	1–0	3–1	2–4	0–0	3–1	0–1
Makedonija	1–1	0–1	2–0	3–1	—	3–0	3–1	7–0	2–0	2–0	1–2	2–2	3–0	0–0
Pelister	0–3	4–1	2–0	0–2	2–0	—	0–1	4–1	3–1	0–0	0–0	1–1	3–0	1–0
Pobeda	1–0	5–1	2–1	3–1	1–2	1–0	—	1–0	5–1	9–2	2–3	6–0	3–1	1–2
Rudar Probishtip	0–0	0–4	3–0 (Note: The match was abandoned in the 44th minute with a score of 1–0 as the referee was hit in the head with a stone thrown from the away fans. Later, the match was awarded to Rudar Probishtip.)	0–3	1–2	2–7	0–1	—	1–5	1–1	0–4	0–3 (Note: The match was originally ended 3–2 to Rudar Probishtip, but later was awarded to Sloga Jugomagnat for unknown reasons.)	1–7	0–1
Sasa	2–0	4–0	2–0	2–0	1–0	3–2	2–2	6–0	—	2–0	0–0	0–2	1–0	0–0
Shkëndija	2–1	1–0	1–2	2–1	1–0	2–1	0–1	3–0	2–0	—	1–4	2–0	2–2	1–1
Sileks	2–0	7–2	3–0	2–1	4–1	5–0	2–0	17–1	6–2	6–2	—	2–0	0–0	1–0
Sloga Jugomagnat	0–0	2–1	1–2	2–2	1–0	2–1	1–0	7–1	2–0	2–0	2–1	—	6–1	3–0 (Note: The match was originally ended 0–1 for Vardar, but was later awarded to Sloga Jugomagnat as Vardar fielded suspended player Zoran Jovanovski who had to serve a one match ban for collected 2 yellow cards.)
Tikvesh	0–0	0–0	3–1	1–0	2–1	2–0	1–1	4–0	1–1	1–0	1–3	0–0	—	0–2
Vardar	1–0	3–0	0–0	1–1	3–0	0–0	0–0	7–0	1–1	3–1	0–3 (Note: The match was abandoned in the 87th minute with a score of 0–1 as a brawl occurred between the players and the home fans invaded the pitch. Later, the match was awarded to Sileks.)	1–0	4–0	—

Source: MacedonianFootball.com
Legend: Blue = home team win; Yellow = draw; Red = away team win.

== Top goalscorers ==
Rank	Player	Club	Goals
1	(North Macedonia) Miroslav Gjokić	Sileks	16
2	(North Macedonia) Goran Stankovski	Sloga Jugomagnat	12
2	(Federal Republic of Yugoslavia) Dragan Mučibabić	Makedonija	12
2	(North Macedonia) Vancho Micevski	Pelister	12
5	(North Macedonia) Nexhat Shabani	Pobeda	11
5	(Brazil) Rogério Oliveira	Pobeda	11
5	(Bulgaria) Mario Petkov	Belasica	11
8	(North Macedonia) Dejan Ristevski	Cementarnica	11
8	(North Macedonia) Toni Eftimov	Pelister	11
10	(North Macedonia) Sasho Krstev	Pobeda	9
10	(North Macedonia) Iskender Jonuzi	Shkëndija	9

Source: Top15goalscorers.blogspot.com

== See also ==
- 1996–97 Macedonian Football Cup
- 1996–97 Macedonian Second Football League
