= 1994–95 Macedonian First Football League =

Macedonian First League
- Season: 1994–95
- Dates: 14 August 1994 – 18 June 1995
- Champions: Vardar; 3rd Macedonian title 4th domestic title
- Relegated: Borec; Kozhuf
- UEFA Cup: Vardar
- Cup Winners' Cup: Sileks
- Matches: 240
- Goals: 714 (2.98 per match)
- Top goalscorer: Saša Ćirić (35 goals)
- Biggest home win: Osogovo 10–0 Borec (30 October 1994)
- Biggest away win: Kozhuf 1–5 Vardar (8 April 1995); Kozhuf 0–4 Belasica (11 June 1995)
- Highest scoring: Sileks 10–1 Kozhuf (6 November 1994)

The 1994–95 Macedonian First League was the 3rd season of the Macedonian First Football League, the highest football league of Macedonia. The first matches of the season were played on 14 August 1994 and the last on 18 June 1995. Vardar defended their championship title, having won their third title in a row.

== Promotion and relegation ==
At the start of the 1994–95 season

Promoted from 1993–94 Second League

- Ohrid (Winners; West)
- Kozhuf Vinojug (Winners; East)

Relegated to 1994–95 Second League

- Karaorman (15th)^{1}
- Makedonija Skopje (16th)

At the end of the 1994–95 season

Promoted from 1994–95 Second League

- Makedonija Skopje (Winners; West)
- Pobeda Valandovo (Winners; East)^{2}

Relegated to 1995–96 Second League

- Borec (15th)
- Kozhuf Vinojug (16th)

1 Karaorman was relegated from the First League after a loss in a relegation tie-breaker match against Borec.
2 Pobeda Valandovo was initially promoted, but was expelled from the First League for unknown reasons.

== Participating teams ==
Location of teams in 1994–95 Macedonian First League

Club	City	Stadium
Balkan BISI	Skopje	Chair Stadium
Belasica	Strumica	Stadion Mladost
Borec	Titov Veles	Gradski stadion Titov Veles
FCU Skopje	Skopje	Stadion Cementarnica
Kozhuf Vinojug	Gevgelija	Gradski stadion Gevgelija
Ljuboten	Tetovo	Gradski stadion Tetovo
Ohrid	Ohrid	SRC Biljanini Izvori
Osogovo	Kochani	Stadion Nikola Mantov
Pelister	Bitola	Stadion Tumbe Kafe
Pobeda Vitaminka	Prilep	Stadion Goce Delchev
Rudar	Probishtip	Gradski stadion Probištip
Sasa	Makedonska Kamenica	Gradski stadion Makedonska Kamenica
Sileks	Kratovo	Stadion Sileks
Sloga Jugomagnat	Skopje	Chair Stadium
Tikvesh	Kavadarci	Gradski stadion Kavadarci
Vardar	Skopje	Gradski stadion Skopje

== League table ==
Pos	Team	Pld	W	D	L	GF	GA	GD	Pts	Qualification or relegation
1	Vardar (C)	30	23	7	0	79	17	+62	76	Qualification for the UEFA Cup preliminary round
2	Sileks	30	18	6	6	66	28	+38	60	Qualification for the Cup Winners' Cup qualifying round (Note: Since Vardar, winners of 1994–95 Macedonian Football Cup, was qualified for the 1995–96 UEFA Cup, losing cup finalists Sileks earned a spot in the qualifying round of the 1995–96 UEFA Cup Winners' Cup.)
3	Sloga Jugomagnat	30	17	7	6	43	26	+17	58	
4	Pobeda	30	16	5	9	55	35	+20	53	
5	Pelister	30	15	6	9	57	40	+17	51	
6	Osogovo	30	11	9	10	53	34	+19	42	
7	Sasa	30	11	8	11	39	30	+9	41	
8	Ohrid	30	11	5	14	45	43	+2	38	
9	Balkan	30	11	5	14	48	51	−3	38	
10	Belasica	30	11	4	15	48	62	−14	37	
11	Tikvesh	30	11	4	15	35	53	−18	37	
12	Rudar Probishtip	30	10	4	16	32	45	−13	34	
13	Ljuboten	30	10	4	16	37	54	−17	34	
14	FCU 55	30	9	6	15	31	40	−9	33	
15	Borec (R)	30	9	6	15	28	57	−29	33	Relegation to the Macedonian Second League
16	Kozhuf (Note: Kozhuf were deducted 3 points.) (R)	30	2	4	24	18	99	−81	7	Relegation to the Macedonian Second League

Source: MacedonianFootball.com, RSSSF.org
Rules for classification: 1) Points; 2) Goal difference; 3) Goals scored; 4) Head-to-head points; 5) Head-to-head goal difference; 6) Head-to-head away goals scored (only if two teams); 7) Head-to-head goals scored; 8) Draw; 9) Play-off. (Note: Criteria 2, 3 and 8 is only used if not deciding Champion or relegation).
(C) Champions; (R) Relegated

== Results ==
Home \ Away	BAL	BEL	BOR	FCU	KOŽ	LJU	OHR	OSO	PEL	POB	RUD	SAS	SIL	SLO	TIK	VAR
Balkan	—	1–1	2–1	1–2	2–0	1–1	2–0	1–4	3–0	3–1	0–1	1–0	2–0	0–1	5–1	1–2
Belasica	3–2	—	3–0	2–1	5–2	4–1	5–1	1–0	2–3	1–1	0–1	0–0	2–1	1–1	5–2	1–2
Borec	2–1	2–1	—	1–0	3–0	1–0	2–1	2–1	1–2	1–2	2–2	1–0	2–2	0–0	1–2	1–1
FCU 55	3–1	2–0	3–1	—	1–1	2–0	0–0	3–2	0–0	3–1	2–0	1–1	0–1	0–1	3–0	0–1
Kozhuf	1–4	0–4	0–1	0–0	—	1–3	1–0	3–0	1–1	2–3	0–2	0–3	0–2	0–2	1–3	1–5
Ljuboten	1–1	3–0	2–1	2–1	5–1	—	1–4	0–3	1–0	1–0	1–0	1–1	1–1	4–0	1–0	1–4
Ohrid	0–0	3–2	2–0	2–0	6–0	4–0	—	2–1	1–0	3–3	5–2	1–1	1–3	1–0	6–0	0–2
Osogovo	3–1	6–1	10–0	2–0	6–0	1–0	1–0	—	2–3	1–1	1–0	1–1	0–0	0–0	3–1	0–3
Pelister	6–4	2–0	0–0	2–0	2–0	4–1	0–0	4–1	—	3–3	3–0	3–0	1–2	6–2	3–0	0–0
Pobeda	0–1	2–1	4–0	3–0	8–0	4–1	2–1	2–0	2–0	—	1–0	1–0	1–0	1–0	2–0	0–2
Rudar Probishtip	1–2	0–1	0–0	1–1	4–1	2–1	4–0	1–0	0–2	4–2	—	2–0	0–0	0–1	2–0	1–2
Sasa	2–1	4–1	2–0	2–0	7–0	4–2	2–0	0–0	1–2	0–2	1–0	—	0–1	1–1	1–0	0–0
Sileks	7–2	3–1	5–2	5–1	10–1	3–2	4–0	0–0	3–0	2–0	3–0	4–2	—	2–1	0–1	1–1
Sloga Jugomagnat	3–3	3–0	4–0	1–0	3–0	3–0	1–0	2–2	1–0	1–0	3–0	1–0	1–0	—	3–1	1–1
Tikvesh	1–0	5–0	1–0	2–1	0–0	2–0	1–0	2–2	3–2	2–2	3–1	0–3	0–1	1–2	—	0–2
Vardar	3–0	8–0	4–0	4–1	4–1	1–0	3–1	0–0	6–3	2–1	7–1	3–0	3–0	2–0	1–1	—

Source: MacedonianFootball.com
Legend: Blue = home team win; Yellow = draw; Red = away team win.

== Top goalscorers ==
Rank	Player	Club	Goals
1	(North Macedonia) Saša Ćirić	Vardar	35

== See also ==
- 1994–95 Macedonian Football Cup
- 1994–95 Macedonian Second Football League
