= 2014–15 FK Vardar season =

Vardar
2014–15 season
- Owner: Sergei Samsonenko
- Chairman: Mirko Spaseski
- Manager: Sergey Andreyev
- Stadium: Philip II Arena
- First League: 1st
- Macedonian Cup: Quarter-finals
- Top goalscorer: League: Filip Ivanovski (11); All: Filip Ivanovski (11)
- Highest home attendance: 3,000 vs Shkëndija; 10 August 2014
- Lowest home attendance: 0 vs Renova; 16 May 2015
Home colours	Away colours

The 2014–15 season was FK Vardar's 23rd consecutive season in First League. This article shows player statistics and all official matches that the club was played during the 2014–15 season.

Vardar was won their eighth Macedonian championship, after only a one-year drought.

== Squad ==
As of 1 February 2015

Note: Flags indicate national team as defined under FIFA eligibility rules; some limited exceptions apply. Players may hold more than one non-FIFA nationality.

No.	Pos.	Nation	Player
1	GK	MNE	Igor Pavlović
25	GK	MKD	Borjan Ristovski
28	GK	MKD	Tome Pachovski
41	GK	CRO	Matija Kobetić
3	DF	MKD	Goran Popov
4	DF	SRB	Radenko Bojović
5	DF	MKD	Zlatko Tanevski (captain)
6	DF	MKD	Boban Grncharov
15	DF	MKD	Filip Stojanovski
19	DF	ARM	Hovhannes Hambardzumyan
32	DF	MKD	Darko Glišić
34	DF	MKD	Dino Najdoski
7	MF	MKD	Blagoja Ljamchevski
8	MF	MKD	Stefan Spirovski
10	MF	ARM	Artak Dashyan

No.	Pos.	Nation	Player
11	MF	MKD	Jasir Asani
16	MF	MKD	Nikola Gligorov
17	MF	BIH	Senijad Ibričić
23	MF	MKD	Filip Despotovski
24	MF	MKD	Aleksandar Temelkov
26	MF	MKD	Viktor Serafimovski
87	MF	MKD	Vlatko Grozdanoski
9	FW	MKD	Dejan Blazhevski
13	FW	MKD	Filip Petrov
18	FW	MKD	Dimitar Ivanov
22	FW	MKD	Filip Ivanovski
31	FW	MKD	Filip Petkovski
45	FW	ARM	Artur Miranyan
50	FW	MKD	Ilcho Naumoski

== Competitions ==
=== First League ===
==== League table ====
===== First phase =====
Pos	Team	Pld	W	D	L	GF	GA	GD	Pts	Qualification
1	Vardar	27	18	7	2	46	15	+31	61	Qualification for the championship round
2	Rabotnichki	27	17	4	6	43	23	+20	55	Qualification for the championship round
3	Shkëndija	27	14	5	8	49	27	+22	47	Qualification for the championship round
4	Renova	27	12	8	7	34	27	+7	44	Qualification for the championship round
5	Sileks	27	8	10	9	26	34	−8	34	Qualification for the championship round

Source: MacedonianFootball.com, Soccerway
Rules for classification: 1) Points; 2) Goal difference; 3) Goals scored; 4) Head-to-head points; 5) Head-to-head goal difference; 6) Head-to-head away goals scored (only if two teams); 7) Head-to-head goals scored; 8) Draw; 9) Play-off. (Note: Criteria 2, 3 and 8 is only used if not deciding teams for championship or relegation round).

===== Second phase =====
Pos	Team	Pld	W	D	L	GF	GA	GD	Pts	Qualification
1	Vardar (C)	32	20	9	3	56	21	+35	69	Qualification for the Champions League second qualifying round
2	Rabotnichki	32	20	6	6	55	30	+25	66	Qualification for the Europa League first qualifying round (Note: Rabotnichki qualified for the Europa League first qualifying round by winning the 2014–15 Macedonian Football Cup.)
3	Shkëndija	32	18	5	9	58	31	+27	59	Qualification for the Europa League first qualifying round
4	Renova	32	13	9	10	41	39	+2	48	Qualification for the Europa League first qualifying round
5	Sileks	32	10	11	11	33	42	−9	41	
6	Metalurg	32	8	9	15	34	42	−8	33	

Source: MacedonianFootball.com, Soccerway
Rules for classification: 1) Points; 2) Goal difference; 3) Goals scored; 4) Head-to-head points; 5) Head-to-head goal difference; 6) Head-to-head away goals scored (only if two teams); 7) Head-to-head goals scored; 8) Draw; 9) Play-off. (Note: Criteria 2, 3 and 8 is only used if not deciding Champion or teams for UEFA competitions).
(C) Champions

==== Results summary ====
Overall								Home						Away					
Pld	W	D	L	GF	GA	GD	Pts	W	D	L	GF	GA	GD	W	D	L	GF	GA	GD
32	20	9	3	56	22	+34	69	12	5	0	32	8	+24	8	4	3	24	14	+10

==== Results by round ====
Round	1	2	3	4	5	6	7	8	9	10	11	12	13	14	15	16	17	18	19	20	21	22	23	24	25	26	27	28	29	30	31	32
Ground	A	H	A	A	H	A	H	A	H	H	A	H	H	A	H	A	H	A	H	A	H	A	H	A	H	H	H	H	H	A	H	A
Result	W	W	W	D	D	W	D	W	W	W	W	W	W	D	W	L	D	W	W	W	D	D	W	W	W	L	W	W	D	L	W	D
Position	1	4	5	5	3	6	6	6	5	2	2	1	1	1	2	2	1	1	2	1	1	1	1	1	1	1	1	1	1	1	1	1

Source: Competitive Matches
A = Away; H = Home; W = Win; D = Draw; L = Loss

==== Matches ====
===== First phase =====
3 August 2014 1	Pelister	0–1	Vardar	Bitola
17:30		Report	Petrov 50'	Stadium: Stadion Tumbe Kafe; Attendance: 6,000; Referee: Marjan Eckoski (Ohrid)

10 August 2014 2	Vardar	3–0	Shkëndija	Skopje
19:00	Ivanovski 34', 75'; Dashyan 54'	Report		Stadium: Philip II Arena; Attendance: 3,000; Referee: Stevche Shuleski (Ohrid)

17 August 2014 3	Bregalnica Shtip	1–2	Vardar	Shtip
17:30	Velkovski 15'; Stojanov (red card) 76'	Report	Hambardzumyan 19'; Petkovski 90+2'; Tanevski (yellow card) 48' (yellow-red card)	Stadium: Gradski stadion Attendance: 4,000; Referee: Marjan Eckoski (Ohrid)

24 August 2014 4	Teteks	2–2	Vardar	Skopje
17:00	Jayme 45'; Nachevski 48'	Report	Ivanovski 15'; Petrov 53'	Stadium: Stadion Gjorche Petrov; Attendance: 500; Referee: Marjan Markoski (Ohrid)

27 August 2014 5	Vardar	0–0	Horizont Turnovo	Skopje
19:00		Report	Jovanoski (yellow card) 0' (yellow-red card) 90+3'	Stadium: Philip II Arena; Attendance: 1,000; Referee: Dimitar Mechkarovski (Skopje)

31 August 2014 6	Metalurg Skopje	1–4	Vardar	Skopje
17:00	Krstev 27'; Gjorgievski (yellow card) 48' (yellow-red card)	Report	Asani 7'; Grncharov 11'; Grozdanoski 65'; Ivanovski 76'	Stadium: Stadion Gjorche Petrov; Attendance: 500; Referee: Dejan Jakimovski (Skopje)

14 September 2014 7	Vardar	1–1	Renova	Skopje
19:00	Petkovski 69'	Report	Emini 88'	Stadium: Philip II Arena; Attendance: 700; Referee: Stevche Shuleski (Ohrid)

20 September 2014 8	Rabotnichki	0–2	Vardar	Skopje
15:30		Report	Petkovski 16'; Tanevski 56'	Stadium: Philip II Arena; Attendance: 1,000; Referee: Aleksandar Stavrev (Skopje)

28 September 2014 9	Vardar	2–0	Sileks	Skopje
15:30	Petkovski 25'; Hambardzumyan 87'	Report		Stadium: Philip II Arena; Attendance: 300; Referee: Marjan Markoski (Ohrid)

4 October 2014 10	Vardar	1–0	Pelister	Skopje
15:00	Petkovski 45'	Report		Stadium: Stadion Gjorche Petrov; Attendance: 500; Referee: Dejan Jakimovski (Skopje)

19 October 2014 11	Shkëndija	1–2	Vardar	Tetovo
14:30	Imeri 74'	Report	Petkovski 6'; Grncharov 15'	Stadium: Gradski stadion Attendance: 10,000; Referee: Dejan Jakimovski (Skopje)

26 October 2014 12	Vardar	1–0	Bregalnica Shtip	Skopje
13:30	Dashyan 34'	Report		Stadium: Philip II Arena; Attendance: 500; Referee: Stevche Shuleski (Ohrid)

29 October 2014 13	Vardar	5–0	Teteks	Skopje
13:30	Petrov 13'; Ivanovski 20', 87'; Dashyan 63'; Ivanov 83'	Report		Stadium: Philip II Arena; Attendance: 200; Referee: Aleksandar Stavrev (Skopje)

2 November 2014 14	Horizont Turnovo	0–0	Vardar	Turnovo
13:30		Report		Stadium: Stadion Kukush; Attendance: 1,000; Referee: Dimitar Mechkarovski (Skopje)

9 November 2014 15	Vardar	3–1	Metalurg Skopje	Skopje
13:00	Dashyan 14'; Asani 33', 47'	Report	Stojanovski 71' (pen.)	Stadium: Philip II Arena; Attendance: 300; Referee: Dejan Jakimovski (Skopje)

22 November 2014 16	Renova	3–0	Vardar	Tetovo
13:00	Emini 31', 76'; Memedi 70' (pen.)	Report		Stadium: Gradski stadion Attendance: 300; Referee: Aleksandar Stavrev (Skopje)

30 November 2014 17	Vardar	0–0	Rabotnichki	Skopje
17:00		Report		Stadium: Philip II Arena; Attendance: 2,500; Referee: Dimitar Mechkarovski (Skopje)

1 March 2015 18	Sileks	0–3	Vardar	Kratovo
14:00		Report	Ivanovski 11'; Blazhevski 13', 18'	Stadium: Gradski stadion Attendance: 1,000; Referee: Marjan Eckoski (Ohrid)

10 March 2015 19	Vardar	2–1	Metalurg Skopje	Skopje
17:00	Blazhevski 43'; Ljamchevski 50'	Report	Krstev 10' (pen.)	Stadium: Philip II Arena; Attendance: 500; Referee: Dalibor Gjorgjevski (Kumanovo)

15 March 2015 20	Horizont Turnovo	0–2	Vardar	Turnovo
14:00		Report	Ibričić 49' (pen.); Ivanovski 90'	Stadium: Stadion Kukush; Attendance: 1,500; Referee: Aleksandar Stavrev (Skopje)

22 March 2015 21	Vardar	1–1	Pelister	Skopje
17:00	Ibričić 17'	Report	Todorovski 90+1'	Stadium: Philip II Arena; Attendance: 2,000; Referee: Faton Mustafi (Tetovo)

4 April 2015 22	Bregalnica Shtip	0–0	Vardar	Shtip
16:00		Report	Dashyan (red card) 86'	Stadium: Gradski stadion Attendance: 3,000; Referee: Dejan Jakimovski (Skopje)

8 April 2015 23	Vardar	2–0	Teteks	Skopje
16:00	Ivanovski 63'; Blazhevski 64'	Report		Stadium: Philip II Arena; Attendance: 700; Referee: Marjan Eckoski (Ohrid)

11 April 2015 24	Sileks	0–2	Vardar	Kratovo
16:00	Simov (red card) 55'	Report	Ivanovski 3'; Blazhevski 56' (pen.)	Stadium: Gradski stadion Attendance: 500; Referee: Goran Spirkoski (Prilep)

19 April 2015 25	Vardar	1–0	Renova	Skopje
16:00	Hambardzumyan 90+2'	Report		Stadium: Philip II Arena; Attendance: 300; Referee: Marjan Eckoski (Ohrid)

24 April 2015 26	Shkëndija	3–2	Vardar	Kumanovo
14:00	Júnior 11'; Vručina 38' (pen.); Juffo 82'	Report	Ibričić 45'; Gligorov 76'	Stadium: Milano Arena; Attendance: 1,000; Referee: Dimitar Mechkarovski (Skopje)

28 April 2015 27	Vardar	2–0	Rabotnichki	Skopje
18:00	Grozdanoski 22'; Blazhevski 39'	Report		Stadium: Philip II Arena; Attendance: 2,000; Referee: Dimitar Mechkarovski (Skopje)

===== Second phase (Championship group) =====
3 May 2015 28	Vardar	2–1	Metalurg Skopje	Skopje
18:00	Blazhevski 1', 57' (pen.)	Report	Taleski (red card) 73'	Stadium: Philip II Arena; Attendance: 300; Referee: Goran Spirkoski (Prilep)

6 May 2015 29	Vardar	2–2	Rabotnichki	Skopje
19:00	Asani 55', 75'	Report	Anene 25', 82'	Stadium: Philip II Arena; Attendance: 500; Referee: Josip Barton (Tetovo)

12 May 2015 30	Shkëndija	1–0	Vardar	Kichevo
16:30	Abdulla 11'	Report		Stadium: Gradski stadion Attendance: 0 Referee: Dimitar Mechkarovski (Skopje)

16 May 2015 31	Vardar	4–1	Renova	Skopje
17:00	Popov 8'; Ibričić 26', 87' (pen.); Spirovski 39'	Report	Emini 36'	Stadium: Philip II Arena; Attendance: 0 Referee: Dejan Jakimovski (Skopje)

24 May 2015 32	Sileks	2–2	Vardar	Kratovo
16:30	Georgiev 48'; Despotovski 87' (o.g.)	Report	Grozdanoski 65'; Ivanovski 84'	Stadium: Gradski stadion Attendance: 1,000; Referee: Faton Mustafi (Tetovo)

=== Macedonian Cup ===
==== First round ====
20 August 2014	Vlaznimi	1–9	Vardar	Struga
17:00	Unknown 49'	Report	Petkovski 10', 46', 87', 88'; Petrov 44', 61' (pen.), 66'; Ivanov 75', 86'	Stadium: Stadion Gradska Plazha; Referee: Faton Mustafi (Tetovo)

==== Second round ====
24 September 2014 First leg	Shkëndija	2–1	Vardar	Tetovo
16:00	Vručina 7' (pen.); Alimi 77'	Report	Grncharov 16'	Stadium: Gradski stadion Attendance: 7,000; Referee: Dimitar Mechkarovski (Skopje)

22 October 2014 Second leg	Vardar	3–0 (4–2 agg.)	Shkëndija	Skopje
15:00	Asani 3'; Dashyan 34'; Tanevski 37'	Report		Stadium: Philip II Arena; Attendance: 500; Referee: Marjan Markoski (Ohrid)

==== Quarter-finals ====
18 November 2014 First leg	Vardar	3–1	Renova	Skopje
16:00	Asani 41'; Petrov 71'; Temelkov 87'	Report	Jusufi 29'	Stadium: Philip II Arena; Attendance: 400; Referee: Dimitar Mechkarovski (Skopje)

6 December 2014 Second leg	Renova	2–0 (3a–3 agg.)	Vardar	Tetovo
15:30	Emini 71'; Mecinovikj 85'	Report		Stadium: Gradski stadion Attendance: 500; Referee: Stevche Shulevski (Ohrid)

== Statistics ==
=== Top scorers ===
Rank	Name	League	Cup	Total
1	(North Macedonia) Filip Ivanovski	11	–	11
2	(North Macedonia) Filip Petkovski	6	4	10
3	(North Macedonia) Dejan Blazhevski	8	–	8
4	(North Macedonia) Filip Petrov	3	4	7
4	(North Macedonia) Jasir Asani	5	2	7
6	(Armenia) Artak Dashyan	4	1	5
6	(Bosnia and Herzegovina) Senijad Ibričić	5	–	5
8	(North Macedonia) Boban Grncharov	2	1	3
8	(North Macedonia) Vlatko Grozdanoski	3	–	3
8	(Armenia) Hovhannes Hambardzumyan	3	–	3
8	(North Macedonia) Dimitar Ivanov	1	2	3
12	(North Macedonia) Zlatko Tanevski	1	1	2
13	(North Macedonia) Nikola Gligorov	1	–	1
13	(North Macedonia) Blagoja Ljamchevski	1	–	1
13	(North Macedonia) Goran Popov	1	–	1
13	(North Macedonia) Stefan Spirovski	1	–	1
13	(North Macedonia) Aleksandar Temelkov	–	1	1
	TOTALS	56	16	72
