= List of FK Vardar managers =

The following is a list of managers/head coaches of FK Vardar.

== Managers ==
- (Socialist Federal Republic of Yugoslavia) Kiril Simonovski (March 1957 – 1958)
- (Socialist Federal Republic of Yugoslavia) Ivan Jazbinšek (?–?)
- (Hungary) Antal Lyka (July 1959 – 1961)
- (Socialist Federal Republic of Yugoslavia) Kiril Simonovski (?–?)
- (Socialist Federal Republic of Yugoslavia) Aleksandar Tomašević (? – 1964)
- (Socialist Federal Republic of Yugoslavia) Franjo Pazmanj (1964–1965)
- (Socialist Federal Republic of Yugoslavia) Dušan Varagić (1965–1968)
- (Socialist Federal Republic of Yugoslavia) Časlav Božinovski (1968 – December 1969)
- (Socialist Federal Republic of Yugoslavia) Jane Janevski (December 1969 – April 1970)
- (Socialist Federal Republic of Yugoslavia) Andon Dončevski (1970)
- (Socialist Federal Republic of Yugoslavia) Kiril Simonovski (July 1970 – 1972)
- (Socialist Federal Republic of Yugoslavia) Časlav Božinovski (1972–1975)
- (Socialist Federal Republic of Yugoslavia) Petar Šulinčevski (1975)
- (Socialist Federal Republic of Yugoslavia) Boris Marović (October 1975 – January 1977)
- (Socialist Federal Republic of Yugoslavia) Časlav Božinovski (January 1977 – ?)
- (Socialist Federal Republic of Yugoslavia) Stjepan Bobek (1978–1982)
- (Socialist Federal Republic of Yugoslavia) Vukašin Višnjevac (1982–1984)
- (Socialist Federal Republic of Yugoslavia) Ilija Dimoski (1984–1985)
- (Socialist Federal Republic of Yugoslavia) Vukašin Višnjevac (1985–1986)
- (Socialist Federal Republic of Yugoslavia) Andon Dončevski (1986–1988)
- (Socialist Federal Republic of Yugoslavia) Metodije Spasovski (1988 – October 1989)
- (Socialist Federal Republic of Yugoslavia) Andon Dončevski (October 1989 – ?)
- (Socialist Federal Republic of Yugoslavia) Đorđe Gerum (? – March 1990)
- (Socialist Federal Republic of Yugoslavia) Kiril Dojčinovski (May 1990 – ?)
- (North Macedonia) Gjoko Hadžievski (1991–93)
- (North Macedonia) Dragan Tomovski (1993–94)
- (North Macedonia) Gjoko Hadžievski (1994–95)
- (North Macedonia) Ilija Dimoski (1995 – March 1996)
- (North Macedonia) Vancho Trpevski (1996 – June 1996)
- (North Macedonia) Kiril Dojčinovski (1996 – September 1996)
- (North Macedonia) Dragan Hristovski (1996 – March 1997)
- (North Macedonia) Metodije Spasovski (1997 – June 1997)
- (North Macedonia) Dragi Kanatlarovski (1997 – February 1998)
- (North Macedonia) Slobodan Goračinov (1998 – March 1998)
- (North Macedonia) Gjore Jovanovski (1998 – February 1999)
- (North Macedonia) Kočo Dimitrovski (1999 – January 2000)
- (North Macedonia) Vangel Simev (2000 – February 2000)
- (North Macedonia) Dragi Setinov (2000 – March 2000)
- (North Macedonia) Perica Gruevski (2000 – June 2000)
- (North Macedonia) Alekso Mackov (2000 – April 2001)
- (North Macedonia) Žarko Odžakov (2001)
- (North Macedonia) Gjoko Hadžievski (2001 – 2003)
- (North Macedonia) Zoran Stratev (2003 – 2004)
- (North Macedonia) Toni Jakimovski (2004)
- (Brazil) Gildo Rodrigues (2004)
- (North Macedonia) Vujadin Stanojković (7 Nov 2004 – Nov 2005)
- (North Macedonia) Petar Georgievski (28 Nov 2005 - Dec 2005)
- (North Macedonia) Dragi Kanatlarovski (15 Dec 2005 – Aug 2007)
- (North Macedonia) Zoran Stratev (10 Aug 2007 – Apr 2008)
- (North Macedonia) Kiril Dojchinovski (5 Apr 2008 - Jun 2008)
- (Serbia) Ratko Dostanić (Jul 2008 - Oct 2008)
- (North Macedonia) Milko Gjurovski (2 Nov 2008 – Feb 2009)
- (North Macedonia) Zhikica Tasevski (1 Mar 2009 - Jun 2009)
- (North Macedonia) Pane Blazhevski (Jul 2009 - Aug 2009)
- (North Macedonia) Mario Vujović (1 Sep 2009 - Nov 2009)
- (North Macedonia) Gjorgji Todorovski (20 Nov 2009 – Feb 2010)
- (North Macedonia) Ilcho Gjorgioski (28 Feb 2010 - Jun 2010)
- (North Macedonia) Gjorgji Todorovski (Jul 2010 – Dec 2010)
- (North Macedonia) Zoran Stratev (1 Jan 2011 - May 2011)
- (Brazil) Leones Pereira dos Santos (16 May 2011 - Jun 2011)
- (North Macedonia) Ilcho Gjorgioski (Jul 2011 – Jun 2012)
- (North Macedonia) Blagoja Milevski (Jul 2012 – Jan 2013)
- (North Macedonia) Nikola Ilievski (14 Jan 2013 - Apr 2013)
- (North Macedonia) Blagoja Milevski (15 Apr 2013 – Jan 2014)
- (Russia) Sergey Andreyev (27 Jan 2014 – Jul 15)
- (North Macedonia) Goce Sedloski (27 Jul 2015 – Jun 2017)
- (North Macedonia) Chedomir Janevski (Aug 2017 – May 2018)
- (North Macedonia) Boban Babunski (4 Jun 2018 – 15 Jul 2018)
- (North Macedonia) Aleksandar Vasoski (Jul 2018 – Dec 2020)
- (North Macedonia) Nikola Ilievski (1 Feb 2021 – 30 Jun 2021)
- (Serbia) Goran Simov (30 Jun 2021 – 20 Sep 2021)
- (North Macedonia) Nikola Gligorov (20 Sep 2021 – 11 Apr 2022)
- (North Macedonia) Boban Grncharov (12 Apr 2022 – 20 Aug 2023)
- (North Macedonia) Aleksandar Vasoski (20 Aug 2023 – 18 Dec 2023)
- (North Macedonia) Gorazd Mihajlov (29 Dec 2023 – 19 Aug 2024)
- (North Macedonia) Goran Petreski (19 Aug 2024 – 1 Sep 2024)
- (North Macedonia) Srgjan Zaharievski (2 Sep 2024 – 5 Nov 2024)
- (North Macedonia) Goce Sedloski (5 Nov 2024 – )
