= FK Rudar =

FK Rudar (which translates as FK Miner) may refer to:

- FK Rudar Pljevlja, Montenegro
- FK Rudar Kakanj, Bosnia and Herzegovina
- FK Rudar Breza, Bosnia and Herzegovina
- FK Rudar Ugljevik, Bosnia and Herzegovina
- FK Rudar Prijedor, Bosnia and Herzegovina
- FK Rudar Kostolac, Serbia
- FK Rudar Bor, Serbia
- FK Rudar Alpos, Serbia
- FK Rudar Probištip, Republic of Macedonia
