= 1996–97 Macedonian Football Cup =

Tournament details
- Country: Macedonia
- Dates: 11 August 1996 – 28 May 1997
- Teams: 32

Final positions
- Champions: Sileks (2nd title)
- Runners-up: Sloga Jugomagnat

Tournament statistics
- Matches played: 69
- Goals scored: 210 (3.04 per match)

The 1996–97 Macedonian Football Cup was the 5th season of Macedonia's football knockout competition. Sloga Jugomagnat were the defending champions, having won their first title. The 1996–97 champions were Sileks who won their second title.

== Competition calendar ==
| Round | Date(s) | Fixtures | Clubs | New entries |
|---|---|---|---|---|
| First Round | 11 August 1996 | 16 | 32 → 16 | 32 |
| Group stage | 4 September, 16 October, 6 November, 1 December 1996, 23 February & 19 March 1997 | 48 | 16 → 4 | none |
| Semi-finals | | 4 | 4 → 2 | none |
| Final | 28 May 1997 | 1 | 2 → 1 | none |

== First round ==
| Team 1 | Score | Team 2 |
|---|---|---|
11 August 1996
| Balkan | 6–1 | Ljuboten |
| Sloga Jugomagnat | 3–1 | Borec |
| Demir Hisar | 1–3 | Tikvesh |
| Turnovo | 1–1 (5–6 p) | Makedonija G.P. |
| Sasa | 1–0 | Vardar Negotino |
| Novaci | 1–3 | Shkëndija |
| Bashkimi | 4–3 | Cementarnica |
| Vardar Prdejci | 0–2 | Vardar |
| Dutlok 79 | 0–5 | Bregalnica Shtip |
| Napredok | 0–2 | Pobeda |
| Skopje | 0–0 (4–1 p) | Osogovo |
| Malesh | 0–3 | Sileks |
| Pitu Guli | 1–4 | Ohrid |
| Teteks | 0–2 | Pelister |
| Belasica | 3–2 | Rabotnichki |
| Debrca | 0–1 | Rudar Probishtip |

== Group stage ==
The winners of the groups were advanced to the semifinals.

=== Group 1 ===
| Pos | Team | Pld | W | D | L | GF | GA | GD | Pts | Qualification | SIL | BAL | SKO | BEL |
|---|---|---|---|---|---|---|---|---|---|---|---|---|---|---|
| 1 | Sileks | 6 | 4 | 1 | 1 | 20 | 8 | +12 | 13 | Semi-finals | — | 1–2 | 5–2 | 5–0 |
| 2 | Balkan | 6 | 3 | 2 | 1 | 15 | 6 | +9 | 11 | | 3–3 | — | 1–2 | 5–0 |
| 3 | Skopje | 6 | 3 | 1 | 2 | 11 | 9 | +2 | 10 | | 0–1 | 0–0 | — | 5–2 |
| 4 | Belasica | 6 | 0 | 0 | 6 | 3 | 26 | −23 | 0 | | 1–5 | 0–4 | 0–2 | — |

Source: rsssf.org

=== Group 2 ===
| Pos | Team | Pld | W | D | L | GF | GA | GD | Pts | Qualification | SLO | PEL | SKË | RUD |
|---|---|---|---|---|---|---|---|---|---|---|---|---|---|---|
| 1 | Sloga Jugomagnat | 6 | 5 | 1 | 0 | 15 | 2 | +13 | 16 | Semi-finals | — | 2–0 | 1–0 | 8–0 |
| 2 | Pelister | 6 | 3 | 2 | 1 | 13 | 4 | +9 | 11 | | 0–0 | — | 4–0 | 6–1 |
| 3 | Shkëndija | 6 | 0 | 3 | 3 | 4 | 10 | −6 | 3 | | 1–2 | 1–1 | — | 1–1 |
| 4 | Rudar Probishtip | 6 | 0 | 2 | 4 | 4 | 20 | −16 | 2 | | 1–2 | 0–2 | 1–1 | — |

Source: rsssf.org

=== Group 3 ===
| Pos | Team | Pld | W | D | L | GF | GA | GD | Pts | Qualification | POB | SAS | OHR | BAS |
|---|---|---|---|---|---|---|---|---|---|---|---|---|---|---|
| 1 | Pobeda | 6 | 6 | 0 | 0 | 17 | 2 | +15 | 18 | Semi-finals | — | 2–1 | 4–0 | 2–0 |
| 2 | Sasa | 6 | 3 | 1 | 2 | 8 | 7 | +1 | 10 | | 0–2 | — | 3–1 | 1–0 |
| 3 | Ohrid | 6 | 1 | 1 | 4 | 8 | 17 | −9 | 4 | | 1–4 | 2–3 | — | 4–3 |
| 4 | Bashkimi | 6 | 0 | 2 | 4 | 3 | 10 | −7 | 2 | | 0–3 | 0–0 | 0–0 | — |

Source: rsssf.org

=== Group 4 ===
| Pos | Team | Pld | W | D | L | GF | GA | GD | Pts | Qualification | MAK | VAR | BRE | TIK |
|---|---|---|---|---|---|---|---|---|---|---|---|---|---|---|
| 1 | Makedonija G.P. | 6 | 4 | 2 | 0 | 7 | 2 | +5 | 14 | Semi-finals | — | 0–0 | 2–1 | 3–1 |
| 2 | Vardar | 6 | 1 | 4 | 1 | 6 | 6 | 0 | 7 | | 0–0 | — | 1–1 | 2–0 |
| 3 | Bregalnica Shtip | 6 | 1 | 2 | 3 | 7 | 9 | −2 | 5 | | 0–1 | 3–1 | — | 1–1 |
| 4 | Tikvesh | 6 | 1 | 2 | 3 | 7 | 10 | −3 | 5 | | 0–1 | 2–2 | 3–1 | — |

Source: rsssf.org

== Semi-finals ==
| Team 1 | Agg. | Team 2 | 1st leg | 2nd leg |
|---|---|---|---|---|
| Sileks | 1–0 | Pobeda | 1–0 | 0–0 |
| Makedonija G.P. | 1–1 (p) | Sloga Jugomagnat | 1–0 | 0–1 |

== Final ==
28 May 1997

| Sileks | 4–1 | Sloga Jugomagnat |
|---|---|---|
| Goshev 24'; Nachevski 27'; Gjokikj 50'; Siljanovski 82' (o.g.) | Report | Tuna 58' (pen.) |

Gradski stadion, Kavadarci
Attendance: 4,000
Referee: Vancho Kocev (Shtip)

== See also ==
- 1996–97 Macedonian First Football League
- 1996–97 Macedonian Second Football League
