= Vasil Gunev =

Macedonian footballer

Personal information
- Full name: Vasil Gunev
- Date of birth: 12 May 1965 (age 61)
- Place of birth: Prilep, SFR Yugoslavia
- Position: Forward

Senior career*
Years	Team	Apps	(Gls)
1984–1986	Pobeda Prilep		
1986–1987	Tikvesh	34	(18)
1987–1988	Pobeda Prilep		
1988–1990	Napredak Kruševac	34	(12)
1990–1992	Vardar	57	(23)
1992–1993	Napredak Kruševac	19	(8)
1993–1995	Omonia Aradippou	36	(14)
1995–1996	União Lamas	8	(1)
- * Club domestic league appearances and goals

Vasil "Vasko" Gunev (Macedonian: Васил Гунев, born 12 May 1965) is a Macedonian retired footballer.

== Club career ==
Born in Prilep, SR Macedonia, back then within Yugoslavia, Gunev started playing in the local team FK Pobeda having played back then in the Yugoslav Second League. He became a prolific striker and in 1988 Serbian side FK Napredak Kruševac, playing in the Yugoslav First League, brought him. Despite Gunev's 10 goals, Napredak finished the season in relegation zone and thus played the next season in the Second League. In 1990 Gunev joined Macedonian side FK Vardar also playing in Second League. In the season 1991–92 Yugoslavia started breaking-up and Vardar was promoted. Gunev was Vardar's top-scorer that season with 8 goals. Gunev then returned to Napredak and played in the 1992–93 First League of FR Yugoslavia having scored 7 goals in the league that season. Gunev was referred to at the 68th anniversary of Napredak as one of the most prolific strikers in the history of the club.

In summer 1993 he moves to Cyprus and plays two seasons there, he only played one UEFA Cup game for APOEL FC against Bangor and then proceeded playing with newly-promoted Omonia Aradippou.
