= Zoran Boškovski =

Macedonian footballer

Personal information
- Full name: Zoran Boškovski
- Date of birth: 11 December 1967 (age 58)
- Place of birth: Skopje, SR Macedonia, Yugoslavia
- Position: Striker

Youth career
- Vardar

Senior career*
Years	Team	Apps	(Gls)
1985–1988	Vardar	14	(0)
1989–1991	Pelister	23	(1)
1990	Vardar	1	(0)
1992–1996	Sileks	52	(46)
2000	Rabotnički	9	(3)
2000-2001	Shkëndija	17	(5)

International career^{‡}
1993–1996	Macedonia	16	(5)

Managerial career
- 2005–2006: Macedonia (assistant)
- 2008–2009: Rabotnichki (assistant)
- 2009–2014: Macedonia U21 (assistant)
- 2012–2014: Teteks (assistant)
- 2014: Teteks (caretaker)
- 2014–2015: Teteks
- * Club domestic league appearances and goals as of 31 August 2009 ‡ National team caps and goals as of 31 August 2009

Zoran Boškovski (Macedonian: Зоран Бошковски; born 11 December 1967) is a retired Macedonian professional footballer.

== Club career ==
Boškovski was twice the top scorer of the Macedonian First Football League, scoring 21 goals during the 1993–94 season and 20 goals during the 1995–96 season, with FK Sileks.

== International career ==
Boškovski was the first player to score for the newly created North Macedonia national football team, just three minutes into its first international, against Slovenia on 13 October 1993. Macedonia went on to win 4–1. Boškovski made 16 appearances and scored five goals for the North Macedonia national football team from 1993 to 1996. His final international was a May 1996 friendly match against Bulgaria.
