= Andon Dončevski =

Yugoslav football coach (born 1935)

Personal information
- Full name: Andon Dončevski
- Date of birth: 19 November 1935 (age 90)
- Place of birth: Kavadarci
- Position: Striker

Youth career
- 1947–1957: Vardar

Senior career*
Years	Team	Apps	(Gls)
1957–1965	Vardar	335	(217)

International career
1961	Yugoslavia B	1	(0)

Managerial career
- 1981–1982: Anorthosis
- 1986–1988: Vardar
- 1988–1989: Preston Makedonia
- 1991–1992: Espérance
- 1993–1995: Macedonia
- 1995–1996: Tikvesh
- 1998: Preston Lions
- * Club domestic league appearances and goals

Andon Dončevski (Macedonian: Андон Дончевски; born 19 November 1935) is a former Yugoslav football coach and former player.

== Club career ==
Born in Kavadarci, he played with FK Vardar youth team in 1952. He was incorporated into the first team of Vardar, becoming their main goal scorer in the Yugoslav First League and Second League amassing a record 217 goals. Among the awards for his efficiency and scoring was an invitation from Red Star Belgrade to play on their team during their tour in South America. He later coached Vardar from 1985 to 1988. In the 1986–1987 season he won the title with Vardar but after legal proceedings the title was given to Partizan. Dončevski took a new challenge to pass on his experience abroad to Anorthosis Famagusta,Espérance de Tunis,Preston Makedonia/Preston Lions FC, the Victorian Premier League team, in Australia.

== International career ==
Dončevski played for Yugoslav national B team in a game against Poland played in Lodz on 4 June 1961. Afterwards he was called for the main national team on several occasions, but failed to make a debut.

== Achievements ==
Vardar

- Yugoslav Cup: 1
  - Winner: 1961
- Yugoslav Second League: 3
  - Winner: 1960, 1963 and 1971
- Macedonian Republic Cup: 7
  - Winner: 1965, 1966, 1967, 1968, 1969, 1970 and 1971
- Mitropa Cup:
  - Semi-finalists (1): 1968
  - Round of 16 (2): 1969, 1970

== Statistics ==
=== Manager ===
Team	Nat	From	To	Record				
Team	Nat	From	To	G	W	D	L	Win %
Anorthosis Famagusta	(Cyprus)	1981	1982	26	8	6	12	30.77
Vardar	(Socialist Republic of Macedonia)	1986	1988	0	0	0	0	—
Preston Makedonia	(Australia)	1988	1989	0	0	0	0	—
Espérance Sportive de Tunis	(Tunisia)	1991	1992	26	11	8	7	42.31
Macedonia	(North Macedonia)	1993	1995	17	5	5	7	29.41
Tikvesh	(North Macedonia)	1995	1996	28	8	8	12	28.57
Preston Lions	(Australia)	1998	1998	0	0	0	0	—
Total				303	124	56	123	40.92
