= Metodije Spasovski =

Macedonian footballer (born 1946)

Personal information
- Date of birth: 4 February 1946 (age 80)
- Place of birth: Skopje, Macedonia
- Position: Winger

Senior career*
Years	Team	Apps	(Gls)
1963–1974	Vardar	314	(64)
1974–1977	1. FC Saarbrücken	60	(4)
1977–1978	Vardar	25	(7)
Total		399	(75)

International career
1968–1969	Yugoslavia	3	(3)

Managerial career
- 1988–1989: Vardar
- 1997: Vardar
- * Club domestic league appearances and goals

Metodije Spasovski (born 4 February 1946) is a Macedonian former footballer who played as a winger. He capped three times for the Yugoslavia national team.

== Club career ==
Spasovski played a total of 647 games in all competitions for hometown club Vardar, scoring 212 goals and ranking him second on both the club's record appearances and scorers lists.

== International career ==
Spasovski made his senior debut for Yugoslavia in a December 1968 friendly match against Brazil in which he immediately scored a goal and has earned a total of three caps, scoring three goals. His final international was an October 1969 FIFA World Cup qualification match against Belgium.
