= FK Balkan Skopje =

FK Balkan
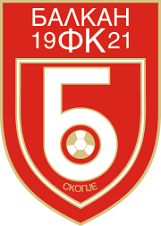
- Full name: Fudbalski Klub Balkan
- Nickname(s): Селтик од Чаир (Celtic from Čair)
- Founded: 3 February 1921
- Dissolved: 2012
- Ground: Čair Stadium
- Capacity: 4,500
Home colours	Away colours

FK Balkan (Macedonian: ФК Балкан) was a football club based in the city of Skopje, North Macedonia.

== History ==
The club was founded in 1921.

They played seven seasons in the Macedonian First League and finished third on two occasions, in 1992–93 and 1993–94.

In 2012, the club was dissolved for the financial reasons.

The main club rival was Sloga Jugomagnat, who shared the ground with them.

== Honours ==
- (Socialist Republic of Macedonia) Macedonian Republic League:
  - Winners (1): 1989-90

== Seasons (1992–2000) ==
Season	League									Cup
Season	Division	P	W	D	L	F	A	Pts	Pos	Cup
1992–93	1. MFL	34	15	10	9	36	21	40	3rd	
1993–94	1. MFL	30	14	9	7	47	32	37	3rd	
1994–95	1. MFL	30	11	5	14	48	51	38	9th	
1995–96	1. MFL	28	9	7	12	31	39	34	8th	R2
1996–97	1. MFL	26	8	9	9	31	26	33	8th	R2
1997–98	1. MFL	25	8	7	10	20	21	31	8th	QF
1998–99	1. MFL	26	4	4	18	14	61	16	14th ↓	R2
1999–00	2. MFL West	34	10	2	22	46	76	32	14th ↓	R1
