= Stadion Nikola Mantov =

Association football stadium in Kočani, North Macedonia

Стадион Никола Мантов Stadion Nikola Mantov
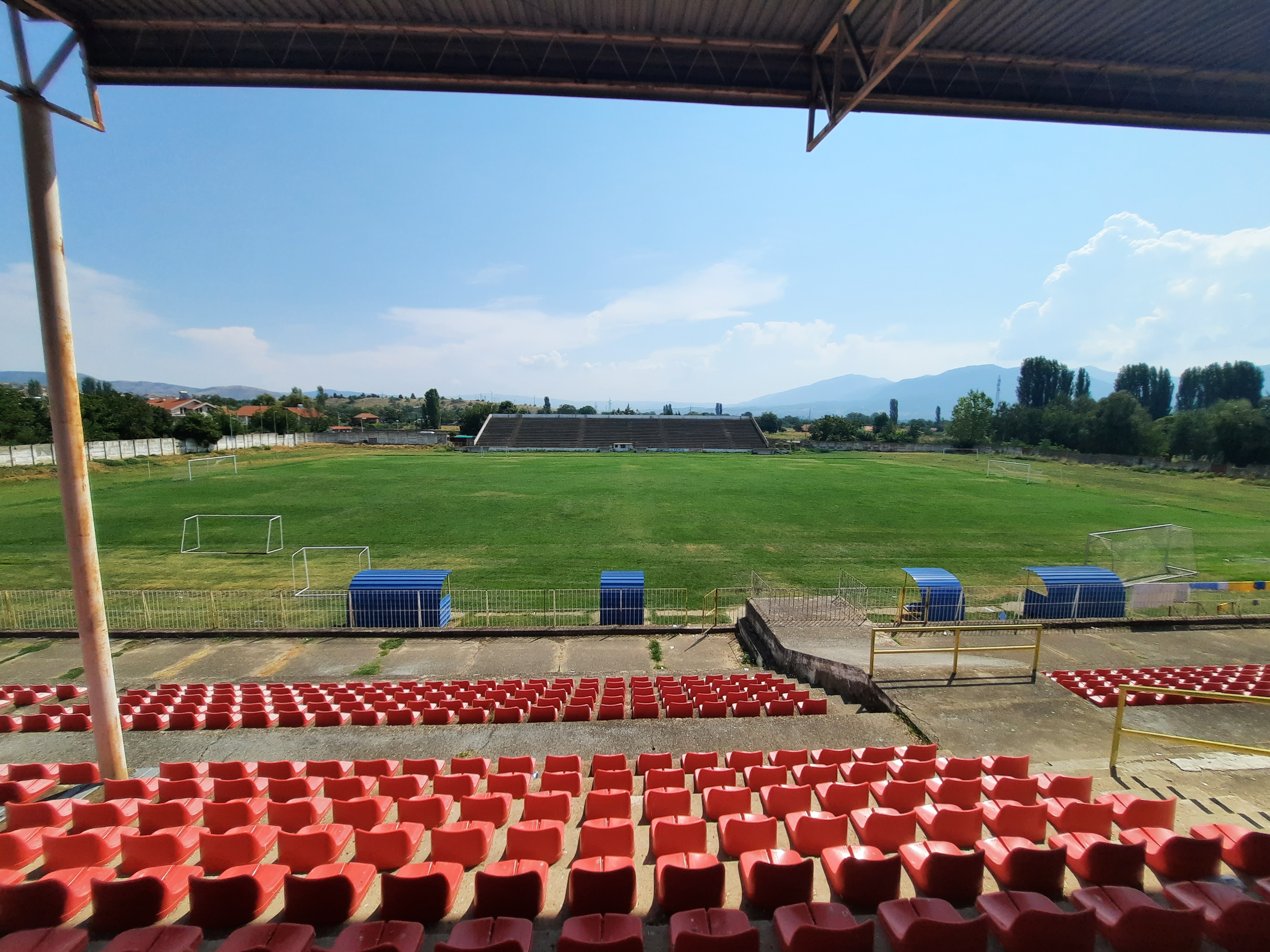
- Interactive map of Стадион Никола Мантов; Stadion Nikola Mantov
- Full name: Stadion Nikola Mantov
- Location: Kočani, North Macedonia
- Coordinates: 41°54′30.7″N 22°24′22.6″E
- Owner: Kočani Municipality
- Capacity: 5,100
- Surface: Grass

Construction
- Opened: 1980
- Renovated: 1994 (west stand)

Tenant
- FK Osogovo Kočani

Stadion Nikola Mantov (Macedonian: Стадион Никола Мантов) is a multi-purpose stadium in Kočani, North Macedonia. It is mostly used for football matches and is currently the home stadium of FK Osogovo Kočani. The stadium seats 5,000 people.

== Name ==
In 1973, during a football match between FK Osogovo and FK FAS 11 Oktomvri from Skopje, the 23-year-old Nikola Mantov - one of the best players of FK Osogovo at the time - collapsed on the field and died. In his honor, the home-ground of FK Osogovo is named Nikola Mantov Stadium. It is one of the few football stadium in North Macedonia named after a football player.

== International fixtures ==
Date	Competition	Opponent	Score	Att.	Ref
North Macedonia (1994–present)
7 September 1994	UEFA Qualifier U21	Denmark	5–3	6,000	
12 April 1995	Friendly	Bulgaria	0–0	8,000	
