= Gjorče Petrov Stadium =

Sporting venue in North Macedonia

Coordinates: 42°0′8″N 21°21′36″E

Gjorče Petrov Stadium Ѓорче Петров Стадион
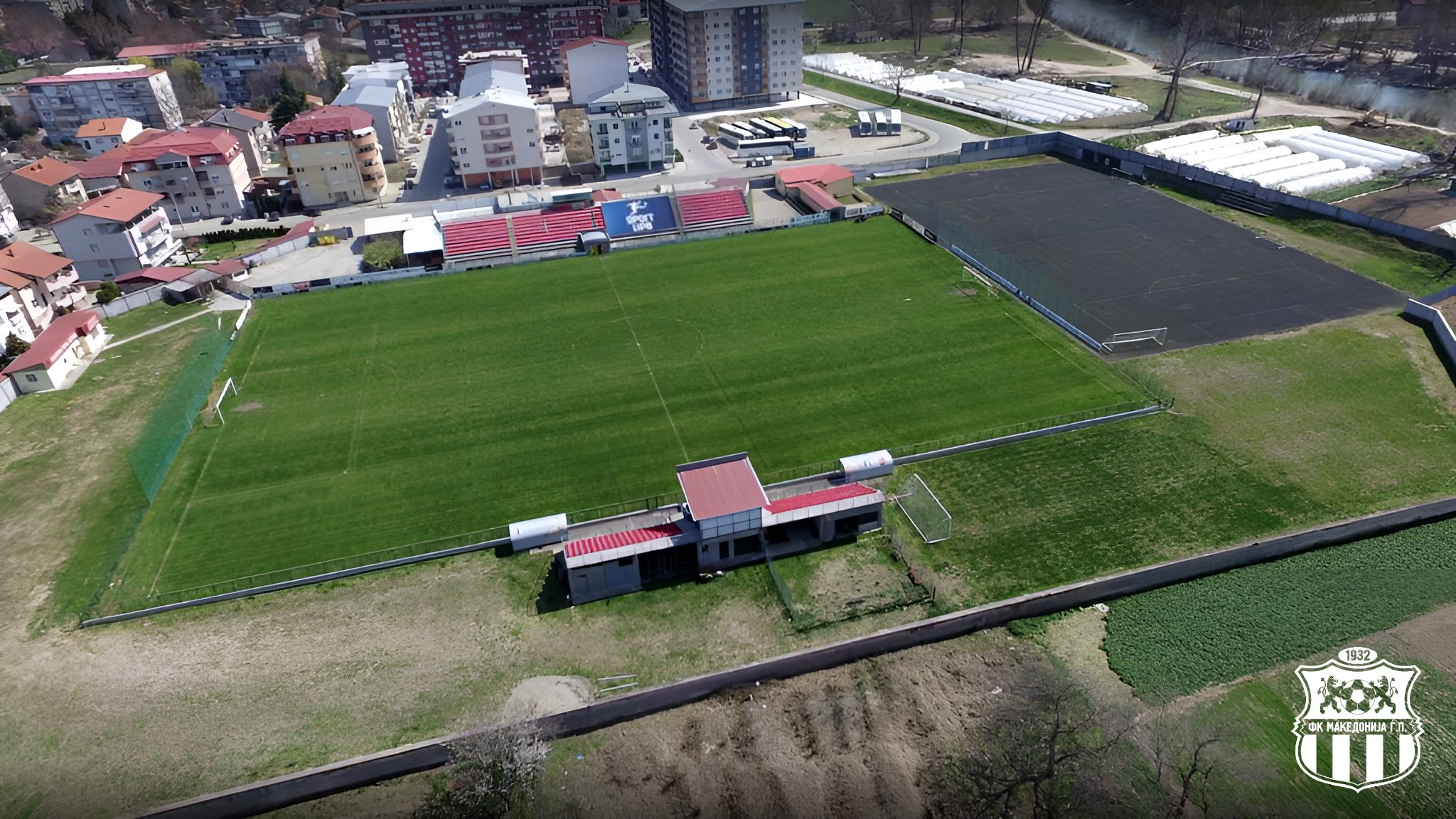
- Interactive map of Gjorče Petrov Stadium; Ѓорче Петров Стадион
- Former names: Jugokokta Stadion
- Address: "Mice Kozar" street, bb Skopje
- Location: Skopje, North Macedonia
- Operator: Municipality of Gjorče Petrov
- Capacity: 3,000
- Surface: Grass
- Field size: 103 m × 64 m (338 ft × 210 ft)

Construction
- Opened: 1971

Tenant
- FK Makedonija G.P.

Gjorče Petrov Stadium (Macedonian: Стадион Ѓорче Петров, romanized: Stadion Gjorče Petrov) is a multi-use stadium in Skopje, North Macedonia. It is currently used mostly for football matches and is the home of FK Makedonija Gjorče Petrov. The stadium seats 3,000 people.
