= Ecolog Arena =

Multi-purpose stadium in Tetovo, North Macedonia

City Stadium
- Ecolog Arena
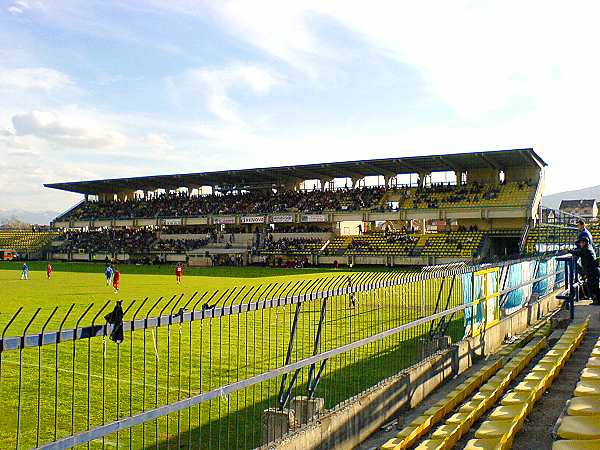
- Interactive map of City Stadium
- Full name: Ecolog Arena
- Former names: Tetovo City Stadium (1981–2016)
- Location: Tetovo, North Macedonia
- Coordinates: 42°01′07″N 20°58′42″E
- Owner: Tetovo Municipality
- Operator: Ecolog International
- Capacity: 15,000
- Surface: Grass
- Scoreboard: LED

Construction
- Built: 1980
- Opened: 26 July 1981; 45 years ago
- Renovated: 2015–2017
- Demolished: 12 April 2024-ongoing

Tenants
- FK Iskra (1996–today); Teteks (1980–today)

Ecolog Arena is a multi-purpose stadium in Tetovo, North Macedonia used primary for football matches. The stadium's capacity is 15,000 seats.

== History ==
The stadium opened in 1981 and was called Tetovo City Stadium (Stadion Gradski Tetovo) or simply Teteks Stadium until 2016.

The Football Federation of Macedonia and the Tetovo Municipality agreed in March 2015 to renovate the stadium as a part of the UEFA "Hat-trick 4" initiative. The renovation began in April 2015 and was completed in April 2016. Floodlights to play matches at night were erected later the same year.

In July 2016, Ecolog International, the owners of KF Shkëndija, took Tetovo City Stadium under concession from the Tetovo municipal council and committed to invest 7.7 million euros to renovate the stadium to be able to host international matches. The ground was renamed Ecolog Arena under the concession agreement.

On 12 April 2024, Tetovo Municipality started the demolition of the stadium for the construction of the new stadium. The new stadium will have 12,000 seats and will be UEFA standard stadium.

On 10 September 2025, Teteks announced that they will return to their home stadium for the upcoming season.

== International fixtures ==
Date	Competition	Opponent	Score	Att.	Ref
Macedonia (1994–present)
12 April 1994	Friendly	Albania	5–1	6,000	
