= Gradski Stadion Kavadarci =

Multi-use stadium in Kavadarci, North Macedonia

City Stadium Kavadarci
- Градски Стадион Кавадарци
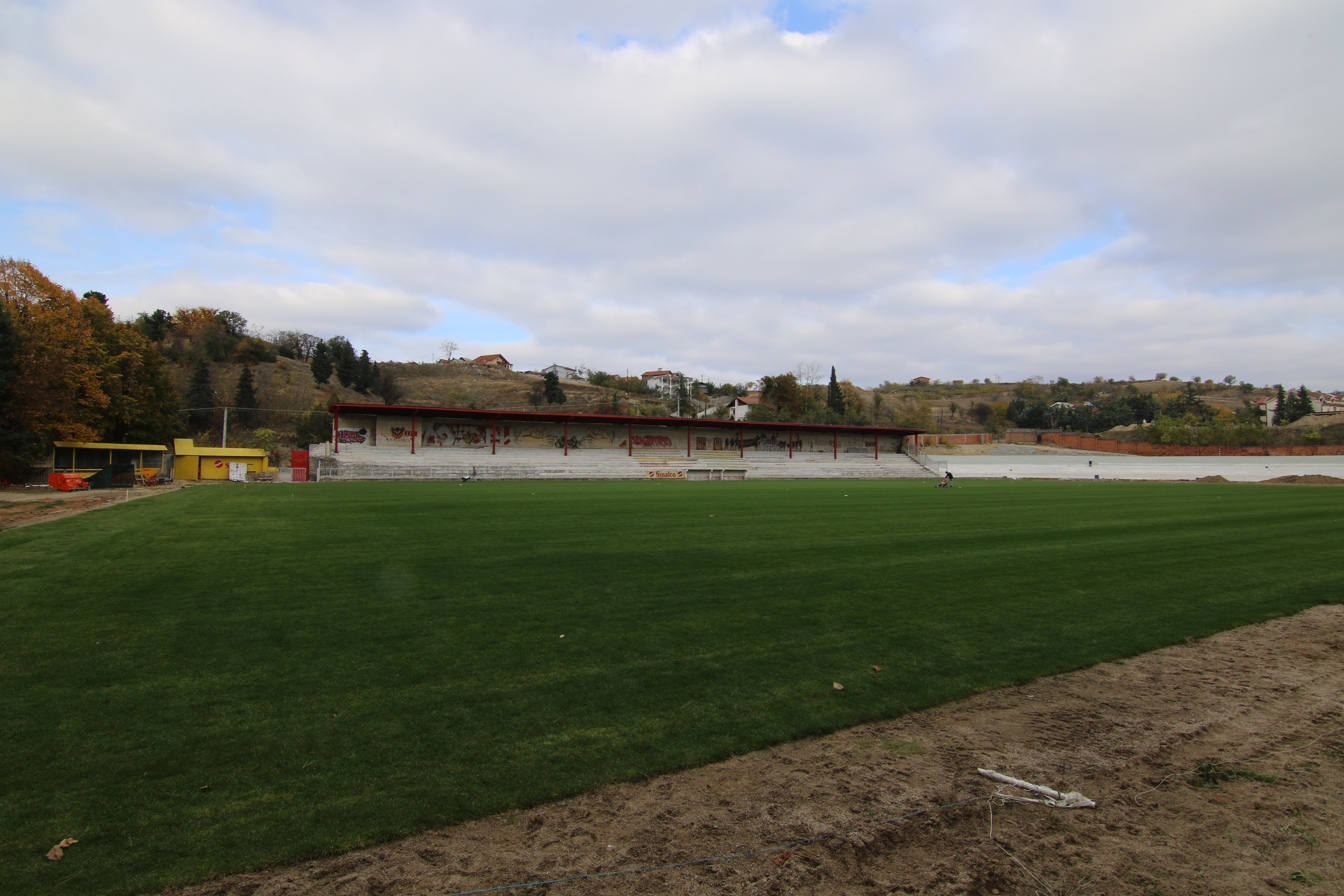
- Interactive map of City Stadium Kavadarci
- Full name: Gradski Stadion Kavadarci; City Stadium Kavadarci
- Location: Disanska 2, 1430; Kavadarci, North Macedonia
- Coordinates: 41°26′6.4″N 22°1′24.1″E
- Owner: Kavadarci Municipality
- Capacity: 7,500
- Surface: Grass

Construction
- Built: 1940s
- Opened: 19 March 1950
- Expanded: 1980

Tenant
- GFK Tikvesh

Gradski Stadion Kavadarci (Macedonian Cyrillic: Градски Стадион Кавадарци) is a multi-use stadium in Kavadarci, North Macedonia. It is used mostly for football matches and is currently the home ground of GFK Tikvesh. The stadium was built in the late 1940s and the first match played was on 19 March 1950 between FK Tikvesh and NK Rudar Trbovlje from Slovenia, qualification for the Yugoslav Third League, the final score was 1–4 for the visitors from Slovenia.

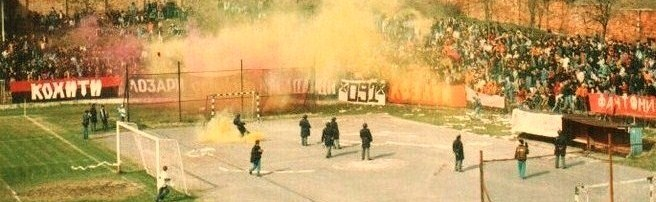
East Stand 28 March 1993

The stadium has hosted the first ever Macedonia U-21 international fixture, a 7–0 win over Estonia U-21 played on 31 May 1994, and also the Macedonian Cup final between FK Sileks and FK Sloga Jugomagnat (4–1) on 28 May 1997.

Although used primarily for football, the stadium has hosted many concerts in the past as well.

The expansion of the new South Stand has finished in the summer of 2023. The development is completed with 1000 covered seats with improved facilities.
