= Stadion Goce Delčev =

Multi-purpose stadium in Prilep, North Macedonia

Стадион Гоце Делчев Goce Delčev Stadium
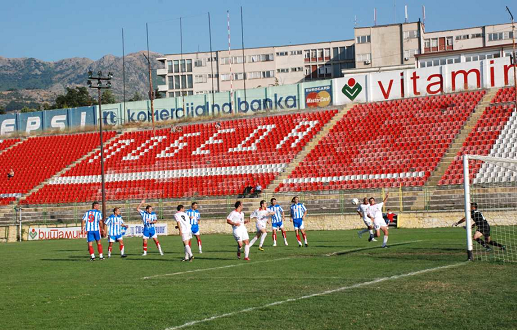
- Interactive map of Стадион Гоце Делчев; Goce Delčev Stadium
- Full name: Stadium Goce Delčev
- Location: Vasko Karangeleski; Prilep, North Macedonia
- Coordinates: 41°20′37″N 21°33′43″E
- Owner: Prilep Municipality
- Capacity: 15,000
- Surface: Grass

Construction
- Opened: 1941 / renovated 2016–2021

Tenant
- GFK Pobeda

The Goce Delčev Stadium (Macedonian: стадион "Гоце Делчев") is a multi-purpose stadium in Prilep, North Macedonia. The total capacity is 15,000 (5,684 seats with a VIP/Media capacity of 400) and is named after the revolutionary leader Goce Delčev. It is currently used mostly for football matches and is the home stadium of GFK Pobeda. The stadium has been used as an alternative home ground of the Toše Proeski Arena for the North Macedonia national football team and has hosted the Macedonian Cup final on two occasions. In 2021 Goce Delčev Stadium was completed renovated after 5 years.

== International fixtures ==
Date	Competition	Opponent	Score	Att.	Ref
North Macedonia
27 March 1996	Friendly	Malta	1–0	3,000	
26 April 2000	Friendly	Albania	1–0	3,000	
17 April 2002	Friendly	Finland	1–0	5,000	
20 August 2003	Friendly	Albania	3–1	3,000	
15 November 2011	Friendly	Albania	0–0	4,500	
