= Cementarnica Stadium =

Multi-purpose stadium in Skopje, North Macedonia

Coordinates: 41°58′05.23″N 21°27′09.43″E

Cementarnica Stadion (Macedonian Cyrillic: Стадион Цементарница) is a multi-purpose stadium in Skopje, North Macedonia. It is currently used mostly for football matches and is the currently home stadium of FC Cool Skopje and formerly of FK Cementarnica 55. The stadium holds 2,000 people.
