= Čair Stadium (North Macedonia) =

Sporting venue in North Macedonia

Coordinates: 42.015460°N 21.444347°E

Čair Stadium Стадион Чаир Stadiumi i Çairit
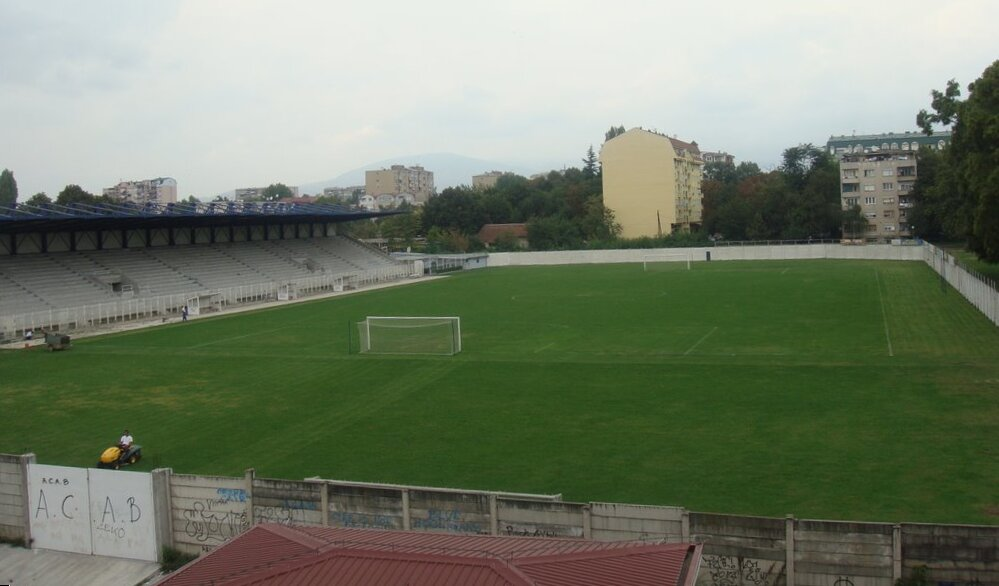
- Interactive map of Čair Stadium; Стадион Чаир; Stadiumi i Çairit
- Location: Skopje, North Macedonia
- Owner: Skopje
- Capacity: 4,500
- Surface: Grass
- Field size: 105 x 68 meters

Construction
- Opened: 1927

Tenants
- Shkupi; Shkëndija 77

Čair Stadium (Macedonian: Стадион Чаир; Albanian: Stadiumi i Çairit) is a multi-use stadium in the Municipality of Čair in Skopje, North Macedonia. It is currently used mostly for football matches and is the former home of FK Sloga Jugomagnat, and currently the home of KF Shkupi (Football Club Shkupi) and KF Shkëndija 77. The stadium has a capacity of 6,000 visitors with 5,000 seats. In early 2000s, it also hosted matches of the Macedonia U21 national team.
