= Gradski Stadion Kratovo =

Coordinates: 42.0808°N 22.1641°E

Sileks Stadium Стадион Силекс
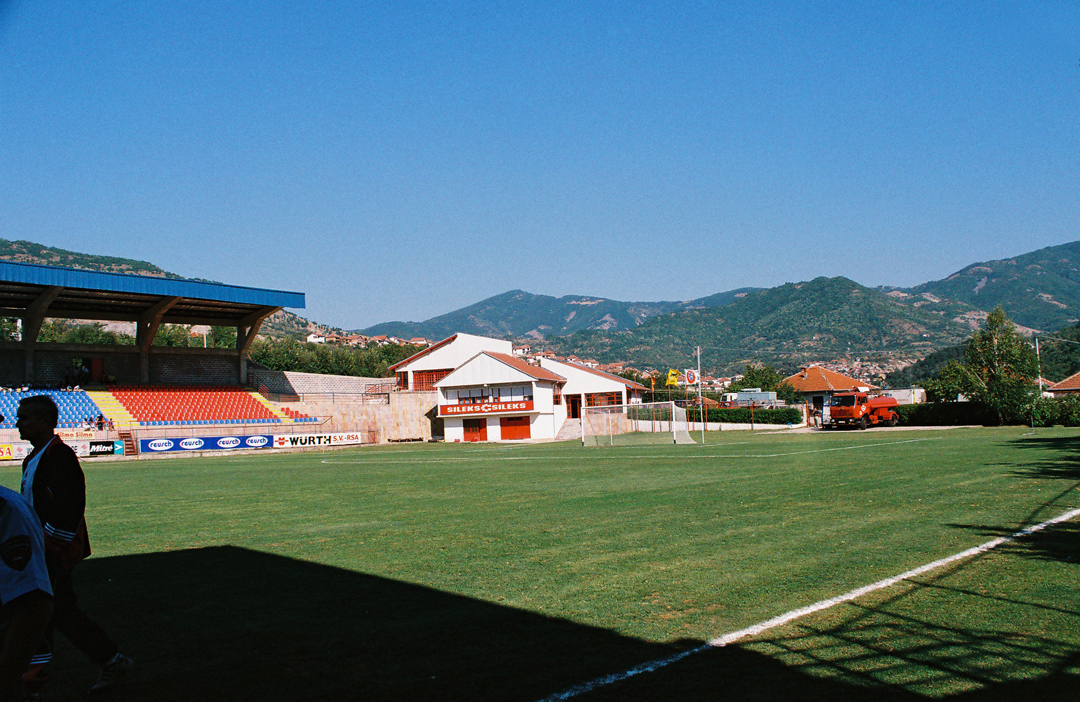
- Interactive map of Sileks Stadium; Стадион Силекс
- Full name: Sileks Stadium - Kratovo
- Location: Kratovo, Macedonia
- Owner: FK Sileks
- Capacity: 1,800
- Surface: Grass

Tenant
- FK Sileks

Sileks Stadium (Macedonian: Стадион Силекс-Кратово) is a multi-purpose stadium in Kratovo, North Macedonia. It is currently used mostly for football matches and is the home stadium of FK Sileks. The stadium holds 1,800 people.
