= FK Rudar Probištip =

Rudar Probištip
- Full name: Fudbalski klub Rudar Probištip
- Nickname: Rudari
- Founded: 1947; 79 years ago
- Ground: Gradski Stadion Probištip
- Capacity: 3,000
- 2025–26: Third League (East), 10th (withdraw)
Away colours

FK Rudar (Macedonian: ФК Рудар) is a football club from Probištip, North Macedonia. They recently competed in the Macedonian Third League.

== History ==
The club was founded in 1947. The club competed in the Macedonian First League five seasons from 1992 until 1997. The highest ranking club was ninth in the season 1992/93.

== Supporters ==
OLD SUPPORTERS the old supporters are known as abre ubre and they were founded in 1990 and dissolved in 2005

NEW SUPPORTERS The new supporters are known as bagabonti and they were founded in 2006

== Current squad ==
Note: Flags indicate national team as defined under FIFA eligibility rules; some limited exceptions apply. Players may hold more than one non-FIFA nationality.

No.	Pos.	Nation	Player
1	GK	MKD	Rudar
