= List of Macedonian football champions =

The Macedonian football champions are the annual winners of the Macedonian First Football League, North Macedonia's premier annual football league competition. The title has been contested since 1929 in varying forms of competition.

== History ==
In 1923, it was organised the first edition of leagues in the Kingdom of Yugoslavia where, beside the top-level national Yugoslav Football Championship, regional championships were also played. The clubs from the Vardarska Banovina, territorially similar to present-day Macedonia, played within the Belgrade Football Subassociation League until 1927, when a separate Skoplje Football Subassociation League was formed. The champions of the Subassociation Leagues were granted a place in the qualifiers for the Yugoslav Championship, a top national level. Gragjanski Skopje became the only club to manage to participate in the national league, first in 1935–36 when the championship was played in a cup system, and in 1938–39, when it was played in a normal league system with Gragjanski finishing 10th out of 12 teams. In 1939, the Yugoslav league system was changed, with the creation of separate Serbian and Croato-Slovenian Leagues which would serve as qualifying leagues for the final phase of the Yugoslav Championship. The clubs from the Skopje Subassociation played their qualifications to the Serbian League, however only Gragjanski managed to participate, doing so on both occasions, in 1939–40 (5th place) and 1940–41 (8th place). That was the last season before the beginning of the Second World War, during which the region Vardarska Banovina was invaded by Axis allies Albania and Bulgaria.

During the war period, 1941 to 1945, the region became part of Bulgaria, and most of the clubs were incorporated into the Bulgarian league system. Four seasons were played, in which FK Makedonija, a club from Skopje formed by the Bulgarian authorities by merging the previously existing clubs Gragjanski, SSK Skopje and ŽSK into one, became the most prominent.

After the liberation of Yugoslavia and the creation of the Socialist Republic of Macedonia within the socialist Yugoslavia, Macedonian clubs participated in the Yugoslav League system that consisted of two or three, depending on time period, national leagues. Below the national leagues, the Republic Leagues were created in each one of the 6 Yugoslav Socialist Republics. The Republic League of SR Macedonia was played between 1945 and 1992, and the top placed teams had access to the Yugoslav national leagues. The most successful clubs from this period were FK Vardar, FK Rabotnički and FK Pobeda, which only don´t count more regional titles because they usually competed in higher national leagues. In 1992 Macedonia declared independence and formed its own league system.

== Royal League ==
Royal District League

- 1922 - Vardar Skopje
- 1923 - Vardar Skopje
- 1924 - Napredok Skopje
- 1925 - SSK Skopje
- 1926 - SK Bitola
- 1927 - Pobeda Skopje

Royal Subdivision League

- 1928 - Pobeda Skopje
- 1929 - Pobeda Skopje
- 1930 - Jug, SSK and Sparta, all clubs from Skopje, finished the season with eaqual number of points.
- 1931 - Not Finished. JUG Skopje
- 1932 - SSK Skopje
- 1933 - SSK Skopje
- 1934 - SSK Skopje
- 1935 - Not Finished. Slavija Skopje
- 1936 - Gragjanski Skopje
- 1937 - Not Finished. Gragjanski Skopje
- 1938 - Gragjanski Skopje
- 1939 - Gragjanski Skopje
- 1940 - SSK Skopje
- 1941 - SSK Skopje

== WW2 Regional League ==
During WWII Macedonia was occupied by German forces.

- 1942 Makedonija Skopje
- 1943 ZhSK Skopje
- 1944 ZhSK Skopje

== Macedonian Republic Football League ==
- 1944–45 Makedonija
- 1945–46 Pobeda Skopje ( Vardar )
- 1946–47 Makedonija Skopje ( Vardar )
- 1947–48 Dinamo Skopje
- 1948–49 11 Oktomvri Kumanovo
- 1949–50 Rabotnik Bitola
- 1950–51 Rabotnik Bitola
- 1951–52 Rabotnicki Skopje
- 1952–53 Pobeda Prilep
- 1953–54 Pobeda Prilep
- 1954–55 Metalec Skopje
- 1955–56 Belasica Strumica
- 1956–57 Pelister Bitola
- 1957–58 FK Belasica
- 1958–59 Pobeda Prilep
- 1959–60 Pelister Bitola
- 1960–61 FK Pelister
- 1961–62 Pobeda Prilep
- 1962–63 Pobeda Prilep
- 1963–64 Bregalnica Štip
- 1964–65 Teteks Tetovo
- 1965–66 FK Rabotnički
- 1966–67 Bregalnica Štip
- 1967–68 Rabotnički Skopje
- 1968–69 Teteks Tetovo
- 1969–70 MIK Skopje
- 1970–71 Kumanovo
- 1971–72 Tikveš Kavadarci
- 1972–73 Rabotnički Skopje
- 1973–74 Teteks Tetovo
- 1974–75 Pelister Bitola
- 1975–76 Bregalnica Štip
- 1976–77 Rabotnički Skopje
- 1977–78 Tikveš Kavadarci
- 1978–79 Pobeda Prilep
- 1979–80 Rabotnički Skopje
- 1980–81 Pobeda Prilep
- 1981–82 Pelister Bitola
- 1982–83 Belasica Strumica
- 1983–84 FK Bregalnica Štip
- 1984–85 FK Teteks
- 1985–86 FK Pobeda
- 1986–87 Metalurg Skopje
- 1987–88 Belasica Strumica
- 1988–89 Borec Veles
- 1989–90 FK Balkan Skopje
- 1990-91 FK Makedonija G.P.
- 1991–92 FK Sasa Makedonska Kamenica

== Macedonian First League ==
In 1992 the Macedonian Republic League, joined by the Macedonian clubs that played in the Yugoslav First and Second League, formed the Macedonian First Football League, the first time Macedonia had its own top-level national championship.

- Semi Professional league since 1992

| Season | Winner | Runner up | Third place | Top scorer (club) (goals) |
|---|---|---|---|---|
| 1992–93 | Vardar | Sileks | Balkan | (North Macedonia) Sasha Kirikj (Vardar) (36) |
| 1993–94 | Vardar | Sileks | Balkan | (North Macedonia) Zoran Boshkovski (Sileks) (21) |
| 1994–95 | Vardar | Sileks | Sloga Jugomagnat | (North Macedonia) Sasha Kirikj (Vardar) (35) |
| 1995–96 | Sileks | Sloga Jugomagnat | Vardar | (North Macedonia) Zoran Boshkovski (Sileks) (20) |
| 1996–97 | Sileks | Pobeda | Sloga Jugomagnat | (North Macedonia) Vancho Micevski (Sileks) (16) (North Macedonia) Miroslav Djokikj (Sileks) (16) |
| 1997–98 | Sileks | Sloga Jugomagnat | Makedonija G.P. | (North Macedonia) Vancho Atanasov (Belasica) (12) |
| 1998–99 | Sloga Jugomagnat | Sileks | Pobeda | (Brazil) Rogério Oliveira (Pobeda) (22) |
| 1999–2000 | Sloga Jugomagnat | Pobeda | Rabotnichki Kometal | (North Macedonia) Argjend Beqiri (Sloga Jugomagnat) (19) |
| 2000–01 | Sloga Jugomagnat | Vardar | Pobeda | (North Macedonia) Argjend Beqiri (Sloga Jugomagnat) (27) |
| 2001–02 | Vardar | Belasica | Cementarnica 55 | (North Macedonia) Miroslav Djokikj (Pobeda) (22) |
| 2002–03 | Vardar | Belasica | Pobeda | (North Macedonia) Ljubisha Savikj (Bregalnica Delčevo / Sloga Jugomagnat) (25) |
| 2003–04 | Pobeda | Sileks | Vardar | (North Macedonia) Dragan Dimitrovski (Pobeda) (25) |
| 2004–05 | Rabotnichki Kometal | Vardar | Pobeda | (North Macedonia) Aleksandar Stojanovski (Belasica) (26) (North Macedonia) Stevica Ristikj (Sileks) (26) |
| 2005–06 | Rabotnichki Kometal | Makedonija G.P. | Vardar | (North Macedonia) Stevica Ristikj (Sileks) (27) |
| 2006–07 | Pobeda | Rabotnichki Kometal | Makedonija G.P. | (North Macedonia) Boban Janchevski (Sloga-Bashkimi / Renova) (26) |
| 2007–08 | Rabotnichki Kometal | Milano | Pelister | (North Macedonia) Ivica Gligorovski (Milano) (15) |
| 2008–09 | Makedonija G.P. | Milano | Renova | (North Macedonia) Ivica Gligorovski (Milano) (14) |
| 2009–10 | Renova | Rabotnichki | Metalurg | (North Macedonia) Bobi Bozhinovski (Rabotnički) (15) |
| 2010–11 | Iskra /Shkëndija | Metalurg | Renova | (North Macedonia) Hristijan Kirovski (Skopje) (20) |
| 2011–12 | Vardar | Metalurg | Iskra/Shkëndija | (North Macedonia) Filip Ivanovski (Vardar) (24) |
| 2012–13 | Vardar | Metalurg | Horizont Turnovo | (North Macedonia) Jovan Kostovski (Vardar) (22) |
| 2013–14 | Rabotnichki | Horizont Turnovo | Metalurg | (North Macedonia) Dejan Blazhevski (Horizont Turnovo) (19) |
| 2014–15 | Vardar | Rabotnichki | Iskra/Shkëndija | (North Macedonia) Izair Emini (Renova) (20) |
| 2015–16 | Vardar | Iskra/Shkëndija | Sileks | (North Macedonia) Besart Ibraimi (Iskra/Shkëndija) (26) |
| 2016–17 | Vardar | Iskra/Shkëndija | Rabotnichki | (North Macedonia) Besart Ibraimi (Iskra/Shkëndija) (20) |
| 2017–18 | Iskra/Shkëndija | Vardar | Rabotnichki | (North Macedonia) Ferhan Hasani (Iskra/Shkëndija) (22) (North Macedonia) Besart Ibraimi (Iskra/Shkëndija) (22) |
| 2018–19 | Iskra/Shkëndija | Vardar | Akademija Pandev | (North Macedonia) Vlatko Stojanovski (Renova) (18) |
| 2019–20 | Vardar | Sileks | Iskra/Shkëndija | (North Macedonia) Daniel Avramovski (Vardar) (10) |
| 2020–21 | Iskra/Shkëndija | Skupi | Struga | (North Macedonia) Besart Ibraimi (Iskra/Shkëndija) (24) |
| 2021–22 | Skupi | Akademija Pandev | Iskra/Shkëndija | (Nigeria) Sunday Adetunji (Skupi) (20) |
| 2022–23 | Struga | Skupi | Iskra/Shkëndija | (North Macedonia) Besart Ibraimi (Struga) (19) |
| 2023–24 | Struga | Iskra/Shkëndija | Skupi | (Montenegro) Aleksa Marušić (Voska Sport) (17) |
| 2024–25 | Iskra/Shkëndija | Sileks | Rabotnichki | (North Macedonia) Marko Gjorgjievski (Sileks) (15) (North Macedonia) Besart Ibraimi (Iskra/Shkëndija) (15) |
| 2025–26 | Vardar | Iskra/Shkëndija | Struga | (Burkina Faso) Bassirou Compaoré (Struga) (17) |

== Most titles ==
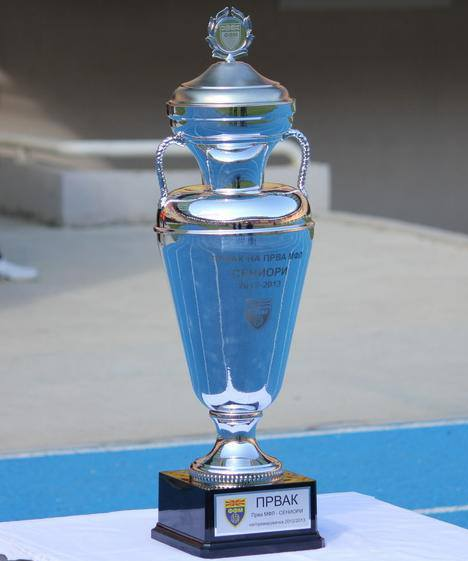
Macedonian First League Trophy

The titles won by clubs since independence are shown in the following table:

| Club | Titles | Runners-up | Winning years |
|---|---|---|---|
| Vardar Skopje | 12 | 2 | 1992–93, 1993–94, 1994–95, 2001–02, 2002–03, 2011–12, 2012–13, 2014–15, 2015–16, 2016–17, 2019–20, 2025–26 |
| Shkendija | 5 | 4 | 2010–11, 2017–18, 2018–19, 2020–21, 2024–25 |
| Rabotnički Skopje | 4 | 3 | 2004–05, 2005–06, 2007–08, 2013–14 |
| Sileks Kratovo | 3 | 6 | 1995–96, 1996–97, 1997–98 |
| FK Sloga Jugomagnat | 3 | 4 | 1998–99, 1999–2000, 2000–01 |
| Pobeda Prilep | 2 | 2 | 2003–04, 2006–07 |
| Struga | 2 | 0 | 2022–23, 2023–24 |
| KF Shkupi | 1 | 2 | 2021–22 |
| Makedonija Gjorce Petrov | 1 | 1 | 2008–09 |
| Renova Djepchishte | 1 | 0 | 2009–10 |
| Metalurg Skopje | - | 3 | |
| Milano Kumanovo | - | 2 | |
| Belasica Strumica | - | 2 | |

=== Cities ===
The following table lists the Macedonian football champions by city

| City | Titles | Winning Clubs |
|---|---|---|
| Skopje | 21 | Vardar (12), Sloga Jugomagnat / Shkupi (4), Rabotnichki (3), Makedonija G.P. (1) |
| Tetovo | 5 | Shkëndija (5) |
| Kratovo | 3 | Sileks (3) |
| Prilep | 2 | Pobeda (2) |
| Struga | 2 | Struga (2) |
| Džepčište | 1 | Renova (1) |
