= Goran Nikolajev =

Serbian-Swedish footballer

Personal information
- Date of birth: 25 January 1980 (age 46)
- Height: 1.88 m (6 ft 2 in)
- Position: Forward

Youth career
- Partizan
- PSK Pančevo
- Dinamo Pančevo
- Čukarički
- Red Star Belgrade

Senior career*
Years	Team	Apps	(Gls)
1998–2000	Red Star Belgrade	0	(0)
1998	→ Veria (loan)	0	(0)
1998–1999	→ Palilulac Belgrade (loan)		
2000–2001	Ljungskile		
2001	Café Opera	16	(5)
- Vasalund/Essinge
- Segeltorps
2006	Ljungskile	17	(7)
2006	Oddevold	2	(4)
2011-2013	Rosseröds IK	25	(8)
2014	Svarteborgs	17	(10)
2017	Hogstorp/Karlsberg	7	(0)
2020	Trollhättans IF	2	(0)
- * Club domestic league appearances and goals

Goran Nikolajev (Serbian Cyrillic: Горан Николајев, born 25 January 1980) is a Serbian-Swedish former professional footballer who played as a forward.

== Career ==
Goran Nikolajev originates from a family with an established tradition in football in the Pančevo region, in Vojvodina, Serbia. His grandfather, Vasa, was footballer of the local clubs, the tradition was followed by his son, Vasa junior, who played with FK Dinamo Pančevo, FK Mogren, clubs at time competing in Yugoslav Second League, before moving abroad to Germany. It was in 1980, when Vasa jr. signed with Mogren that his son Goran was born. Inevitably, Goran started playing football very young. First he started playing in the youngest levels at Serbian power-house FK Partizan coached by Florijan Matekalo and Sava Paunović. Then he returned for a period to Pančevo and played in the youth teams of PSK Pančevo and FK Dinamo Pančevo before returning to Belgrade and continuing his youth career first at FK Čukarički and then signing with the other Serbian power-house, Red Star Belgrade.

After playing in youth team of Red Star Belgrade from where he moved to his ambitions were high, and he moves abroad, joining Veria F.C. playing with them the second half of the 1997–98 Alpha Ethniki. The club finished relegated and in summer 1998 Nikolajev returned to Red Star, and decided to move to FK Palilulac Beograd playing in the 1998–99 Second League of FR Yugoslavia.

Since 1999 he plays in Sweden. He first played with Ljungskile SK, and then with FC Café Opera playing with them in the 2001 Superettan where he made impact by scoring three goals in the opening two games, and in 2002 Superettan. Next, he played with Vasalund/Essinge IF and with Segeltorps IF. Then he played with Ljungskile SK in the 2006 Superettan.

In 2015, he joined Svarteborgs FK and has been playing with them in 2016 season as well.

In Sweden his name is sometimes displayed as Goran Nikolayev.
