= 1978–79 Yugoslav Second League =

Yugoslav Second League
- Season: 1978–79
- Champions: Čelik (West Division); Vardar (East Division)
- Promoted: Čelik; Vardar
- Relegated: Radnik Bijeljina; Segesta; Rudar Ljubija; Mercator; Liria; Jedinstvo Bijelo Polje; Budućnost Peć; Tikveš

The 1978–79 Yugoslav Second League season was the 33rd season of the Second Federal League (Serbo-Croatian: Druga savezna liga), the second level association football competition of SFR Yugoslavia, since its establishment in 1946. The league was contested in two regional groups (West Division and East Division), with 16 clubs each.

== West Division ==
=== Teams ===
A total of sixteen teams contested the league, including eleven sides from the 1977–78 season, one club relegated from the 1977–78 Yugoslav First League and four sides promoted from the 1977–78 Yugoslav Third League. The league was contested in a double round robin format, with each club playing every other club twice, for a total of 30 rounds. Two points were awarded for wins and one point for draws.

Čelik Zenica were relegated from the 1977–78 Yugoslav First League after finishing the season in 17th place of the league table. The four clubs promoted to the second level were Bosna, Mercator, Segesta and Spartak Subotica.

Locations of teams' home cities in the 1978–79 Yugoslav Second League West

| Team | Location | Federal subject | Position in 1977–78 |
|---|---|---|---|
| Bosna | Visoko | SR Bosnia and Herzegovina | — |
| Čelik | Zenica | SR Bosnia and Herzegovina | — |
| Dinamo Vinkovci | Vinkovci | SR Croatia | 7th |
| Famos Hrasnica | Hrasnica | SR Bosnia and Herzegovina | 8th |
| Iskra | Bugojno | SR Bosnia and Herzegovina | 5th |
| Kikinda | Kikinda | (Socialist Republic of Serbia) SAP Vojvodina | 3rd |
| Leotar | Trebinje | SR Bosnia and Herzegovina | 9th |
| Maribor | Maribor | SR Slovenia | 4th |
| Mercator | Ljubljana | SR Slovenia | — |
| Novi Sad | Novi Sad | (Socialist Republic of Serbia) SAP Vojvodina | 12th |
| Proleter Zrenjanin | Zrenjanin | (Socialist Republic of Serbia) SAP Vojvodina | 2nd |
| Radnik Bijeljina | Bijeljina | SR Bosnia and Herzegovina | 10th |
| Rudar Ljubija | Prijedor | SR Bosnia and Herzegovina | 6th |
| Rudar Velenje | Velenje | SR Slovenia | 11th |
| Segesta | Sisak | SR Croatia | — |
| Spartak Subotica | Subotica | (Socialist Republic of Serbia) SAP Vojvodina | — |

=== League table ===
| Pos | Team | Pld | W | D | L | GF | GA | GD | Pts | Promotion or relegation |
|---|---|---|---|---|---|---|---|---|---|---|
| 1 | Čelik (C, P) | 30 | 14 | 12 | 4 | 42 | 21 | +21 | 40 | Promotion to Yugoslav First League |
| 2 | Maribor | 30 | 12 | 10 | 8 | 46 | 34 | +12 | 34 | |
| 3 | Novi Sad | 30 | 12 | 10 | 8 | 47 | 36 | +11 | 34 | |
| 4 | Dinamo Vinkovci | 30 | 15 | 3 | 12 | 44 | 31 | +13 | 33 | |
| 5 | Proleter Zrenjanin | 30 | 13 | 6 | 11 | 45 | 36 | +9 | 32 | |
| 6 | Bosna | 30 | 13 | 6 | 11 | 45 | 48 | −3 | 32 | |
| 7 | Iskra | 30 | 14 | 3 | 13 | 38 | 29 | +9 | 31 | |
| 8 | Spartak Subotica | 30 | 13 | 4 | 13 | 42 | 41 | +1 | 30 | |
| 9 | Famos Hrasnica | 30 | 9 | 12 | 9 | 31 | 31 | 0 | 30 | |
| 10 | Leotar | 30 | 10 | 9 | 11 | 43 | 35 | +8 | 29 | |
| 11 | Kikinda | 30 | 9 | 11 | 10 | 26 | 30 | −4 | 29 | |
| 12 | Rudar | 30 | 11 | 6 | 13 | 44 | 49 | −5 | 28 | |
| 13 | Radnik (R) | 30 | 8 | 11 | 11 | 20 | 28 | −8 | 27 | Relegation to Inter-Republic Leagues |
| 14 | Segesta (R) | 30 | 9 | 9 | 12 | 43 | 53 | −10 | 27 | Relegation to Inter-Republic Leagues |
| 15 | Rudar Ljubija (R) | 30 | 12 | 3 | 15 | 34 | 51 | −17 | 27 | Relegation to Inter-Republic Leagues |
| 16 | Mercator (R) | 30 | 7 | 3 | 20 | 24 | 61 | −37 | 17 | Relegation to Inter-Republic Leagues |

Source: nkmaribor.com
Rules for classification: 1) points; 2) goal difference; 3) number of goals scored.
(C) Champions; (P) Promoted; (R) Relegated

=== Top scorers ===
| Rank | Player | Club | Goals |
|---|---|---|---|
| 1 | (Socialist Federal Republic of Yugoslavia) Veselin Zrilić | Leotar | 22 |
| 2 | (Socialist Federal Republic of Yugoslavia) Nurif Nargilić | Bosna | 19 |
| 3 | (Socialist Federal Republic of Yugoslavia) Slobodan Kustudić | Rudar Velenje | 14 |
| 4 | (Socialist Federal Republic of Yugoslavia) Zoltan Dudaš | Novi Sad | 13 |
| 5 | (Socialist Federal Republic of Yugoslavia) Rade Radulović | Čelik | 12 |
| 6 | (Socialist Federal Republic of Yugoslavia) Fajko Orman | Iskra | 11 |
| 7 | (Socialist Federal Republic of Yugoslavia) Mehmed Buza | Čelik | 9 |
| 7 | (Socialist Federal Republic of Yugoslavia) Dušan Poljanšek | Mercator | 9 |
| 7 | (Socialist Federal Republic of Yugoslavia) Vito Samardžija | Rudar Ljublja | 9 |
| 7 | (Socialist Federal Republic of Yugoslavia) Ivica Tunjić | Dinamo Vinkovci | 9 |
| 7 | (Socialist Federal Republic of Yugoslavia) Zoran Vještica | Novi Sad | 9 |
| 7 | (Socialist Federal Republic of Yugoslavia) Savo Zolotić | Mercator / Maribor | 9 |

== East Division ==
=== Teams ===
A total of sixteen teams contested the league, including eleven sides from the 1977–78 season, one club relegated from the 1977–78 Yugoslav First League and four sides promoted from the 1977–78 Yugoslav Third League. The league was contested in a double round robin format, with each club playing every other club twice, for a total of 30 rounds. Two points were awarded for wins and one point for draws.

Trepča were relegated from the 1977–78 Yugoslav First League after finishing the season in 18th place of the league table. The four clubs promoted to the second level were Budućnost Peć, Galenika Zemun, Jedinstvo Bijelo Polje and Tikveš.

Locations of teams' home cities in the 1978–79 Yugoslav Second League East

| Team | Location | Federal subject | Position in 1977–78 |
|---|---|---|---|
| Borac Čačak | Čačak | SR Serbia | 8th |
| Budućnost Peć | Peć | (Socialist Republic of Serbia) SAP Kosovo | — |
| Dubočica | Leskovac | SR Serbia | 4th |
| Galenika Zemun | Zemun | SR Serbia | — |
| Jedinstvo Bijelo Polje | Bijelo Polje | SR Montenegro | — |
| Liria | Prizren | (Socialist Republic of Serbia) SAP Kosovo | 12th |
| Majdanpek | Majdanpek | SR Serbia | 11th |
| Rad | Belgrade | SR Serbia | 10th |
| Radnički Kragujevac | Kragujevac | SR Serbia | 5th |
| Radnički Pirot | Pirot | SR Serbia | 9th |
| Sutjeska | Nikšić | SR Montenegro | 6th |
| Šumadija Aranđelovac | Aranđelovac | SR Serbia | 7th |
| Teteks | Tetovo | SR Macedonia | 2nd |
| Tikveš | Kavadarci | SR Macedonia | — |
| Trepča | Kosovska Mitrovica | (Socialist Republic of Serbia) SAP Kosovo | — |
| Vardar | Skopje | SR Macedonia | 3rd |

=== League table ===
| Pos | Team | Pld | W | D | L | GF | GA | GD | Pts | Qualification or relegation |
|---|---|---|---|---|---|---|---|---|---|---|
| 1 | Vardar (C, P) | 30 | 19 | 5 | 6 | 63 | 30 | +33 | 43 | Promotion to Yugoslav First League |
| 2 | Trepča | 30 | 17 | 8 | 5 | 27 | 18 | +9 | 42 | |
| 3 | Radnički Kragujevac | 30 | 15 | 8 | 7 | 46 | 30 | +16 | 38 | |
| 4 | Galenika Zemun | 30 | 12 | 12 | 6 | 55 | 36 | +19 | 36 | |
| 5 | Sutjeska Nikšić | 30 | 10 | 12 | 8 | 36 | 26 | +10 | 32 | |
| 6 | Radnički Pirot (Note: Radnički Pirot were docked 6 points.) | 30 | 15 | 7 | 8 | 43 | 24 | +19 | 31 | |
| 7 | Borac Čačak | 30 | 11 | 8 | 11 | 30 | 31 | −1 | 30 | |
| 8 | Šumadija Aranđelovac | 30 | 9 | 11 | 10 | 35 | 38 | −3 | 29 | |
| 9 | Dubočica | 30 | 10 | 9 | 11 | 22 | 32 | −10 | 29 | |
| 10 | Rad | 30 | 7 | 14 | 9 | 26 | 29 | −3 | 28 | |
| 11 | Majdanpek | 30 | 9 | 10 | 11 | 28 | 32 | −4 | 28 | |
| 12 | Teteks | 30 | 11 | 6 | 13 | 30 | 36 | −6 | 28 | |
| 13 | Liria (R) | 30 | 10 | 8 | 12 | 35 | 44 | −9 | 28 | Relegation to Inter-Republic Leagues |
| 14 | Jedinstvo Bijelo Polje (R) | 30 | 7 | 12 | 11 | 29 | 32 | −3 | 26 | Relegation to Inter-Republic Leagues |
| 15 | Budućnost Peć (R) | 30 | 3 | 8 | 19 | 14 | 44 | −30 | 14 | Relegation to Inter-Republic Leagues |
| 16 | Tikveš (R) | 30 | 4 | 4 | 22 | 27 | 64 | −37 | 12 | Relegation to Inter-Republic Leagues |

Source: fsgzrenjanin.com
Rules for classification: 1) points; 2) goal difference; 3) number of goals scored.
(C) Champions; (P) Promoted; (R) Relegated

=== Top scorers ===
| Rank | Player | Club | Goals |
|---|---|---|---|
| 1 | (Socialist Federal Republic of Yugoslavia) Risto Gligorovski | Vardar | 14 |
| 1 | (Socialist Federal Republic of Yugoslavia) Dragan Pavlović | Radnički Pirot | 14 |
| 1 | (Socialist Federal Republic of Yugoslavia) Milenko Radivojević | Radnički Kragujevac | 14 |
| 1 | (Socialist Federal Republic of Yugoslavia) Vasil Ringov | Vardar | 14 |
| 5 | (Socialist Federal Republic of Yugoslavia) Dragan Janićijević | Borac Čačak | 12 |
| 6 | (Socialist Federal Republic of Yugoslavia) Simo Nikolić | Galenika Zemun | 11 |
| 6 | (Socialist Federal Republic of Yugoslavia) Milodrag Panić | Šumadija Aranđelovac | 11 |
| 8 | (Socialist Federal Republic of Yugoslavia) Miroljub Đorđević | Radnički Pirot | 10 |
| 8 | (Socialist Federal Republic of Yugoslavia) Gezim Ljalja | Galenika Zemun | 10 |
| 8 | (Socialist Federal Republic of Yugoslavia) Borče Micevski | Vardar | 10 |
| 8 | (Socialist Federal Republic of Yugoslavia) Božidar Stefanović | Dubočica | 10 |

== See also ==
- 1978–79 Yugoslav First League
- 1978–79 Yugoslav Cup
