= António Gomes =

Portuguese footballer

Antόnio Gomes
Personal information
- Full name: António Pedro Pina Gome
- Date of birth: 29 August 2000 (age 26)
- Place of birth: Lisbon, Portugal
- Height: 1.76 m (5 ft 9 in)
- Position: Right winger

Team information
- Current team: Radnički 1923
- Number: 29

Youth career
- 2015–2016: FC Rodange 91
- 2016–2019: Atalanta
- 2019–2020: Pescara

Senior career*
Years	Team	Apps	(Gls)
2020-2021	Oliveirense	15	(0)
2021-2023	Pétange	48	(6)
2023-2024	Virton	21	(1)
2024-2025	Racing Union	33	(4)
2025-	Radnički 1923	5	(0)

International career^{‡}
2015	Luxembourg U16	3	(1)
2015	Luxembourg U17	2	(0)
2016	Portugal U16	3	(0)
2016	Portugal U17	6	(0)
2018	Portugal U18	6	(0)
2018	Portugal U19	5	(0)
- * Club domestic league appearances and goals as of 5 June 2026 ‡ National team caps and goals as of 27 July 2019

António Pedro Pina Gomes (born 29 August 2000 in Portugal) is a Portuguese footballer who plays as a right winger for Serbian SuperLiga club Radnički 1923.

== Club career ==
Gomes started his career in Serie A youth side Atalanta after playing for the youth academy of FC Rodange 91 in Luxembourg.

In 2019, he signed for Italian second division team Pescara.

In 2020, Gomes signed for Oliveirense in the Portuguese second division.
