= GFK Tikvesh =

Tikvesh
- Full name: Gradski Fudbalski Klub Tikvesh 1930
- Nicknames: Lozari (Winegrowers); Лозари
- Founded: 21 December 1930; 95 years ago
- Ground: Kavadarci City Stadium
- Capacity: 7,500
- Coordinates: 41°26′6.4″N 22°1′24.1″E
- Owner: Kavadarci Municipality
- Chairman: Sezer Bravo
- Head coach: Oliver Bogatinov
- League: Macedonian First League
- 2025–26: Macedonian First League, 5th
Home colours	Away colours

Active departments of Sports Club Tikvesh
Football	Basketball	Handball

GFK Tikvesh 1930 (Macedonian: Градски Фудбалски Клуб Тиквеш 1930), commonly referred to as Tikvesh, is a professional football club from Kavadarci that competes in the Macedonian First League. After playing at different home grounds in the early years, the club moved to Gradski Stadion Kavadarci on 19 March 1950 and have remained there since.

The 'golden age' of the club came in the late 1960s and lasted throughout the entire 1970s. Tikvesh had won the Macedonian Republic League twice (1971–72; 1977–78), and they have competed in the Yugoslav Second League for five seasons (1955–56; 1968–69; 1969–70; 1972–73; 1978–79). Tikvesh was one of the 18 founding members of the Macedonian First League in 1992. In the 2023–24 season the club has won their first Macedonian Football Cup. The club's traditional colours are red and white, they are nicknamed the Winegrowers and they have contested the Winegrowers Derby with their neighbouring rivals FK Vardar Negotino, although Tikvesh have predominantly played in higher league so their meetings have only been sporadic.

== History ==
=== Foundation and early years ===
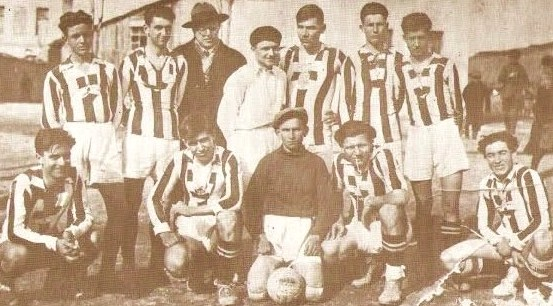
FK Tikvesh in 1933 – Blazho Ponchev, Lazo Josifov, Razvigor Tentov, Aleksandar Hadzhivasilev, Kiro Hadzhilazov, Boro Ponchev, Aleksandar Shemov, Ilija Banjanski, Nakjo Kimov, Fercho Chejkov, Ilija Mukaetov, A. Chaejov

Tikvesh was founded on 21 December 1930 by a group of young enthusiasts who held their meeting in the Balkan restaurant in Kavadarci. Slavcho Temkov became the first president of the newly formed club, Todor Janakiev was chosen as secretary while Aleksandar Hadzhivasilev was the first main sponsor.

The club's early years were mostly spent playing friendly matches with other teams from Kavadarci and some neighbouring towns. At this early stage Tikvesh was overshadowed by the other football clubs from Kavadarci, such as FK Zanaetchiski, FK Ljubash, FK Jugoslavija and FK Strasho Pindzhur, but after the resumption of football following World War II Tikvesh were admitted into the Football League and the club established itself. In 1948–49 Tikvesh achieved a 6th-place finish in the Macedonian Republic League, level on points with 5th placed FK Shar Tetovo but weaker goal difference.

=== 1950s and 1960s (Vuko Karov's era) ===
First taste of success

The club made its first notable achievements in the 1950s.

In 1950 the Football Association of Yugoslavia based in Belgrade created a unified third-tier football league in Yugoslavia. Tikvesh started their qualification campaign for the Yugoslav Third League with a 4–2 win against FK Crvena Dzvezda (Veles), followed by a 3–1 win over FK Goce Delchev (Prilep). These two wins gave Tikvesh a chance to play further in two-legged play-off games. But they failed to qualify in the Yugoslav Third League after losing 4–1 (home) and 7–1 (away) to Rudar, and 11–0 (away) and 4–1 (home) to Radnički, who later went on to win the Yugoslav Third League and were promoted to the Yugoslav Second League alongside Rudar. The 11–0 loss by Radnički is Tikvesh's largest defeat. After failing to qualify in the Yugoslav Third League, Tikvesh continued the season in the Macedonian Republic League and finished in third place, behind champions FK Rabotnik Bitola and second placed FK Goce Delchev (Prilep).

During the 1950s and 1960s the league system was changed several times and the Macedonian Republic League was often divided into three parallel divisions (Shtip, Bitola, Skopje), at the end of the seasons the winners of each division played in the play-off finals to decide the Macedonian Champion. Tikvesh won the Shtip Division in 1952–53 but lost in the play-off finals and missed out on a chance to be crowned champions for the first time. The following season they came close to winning the title. With two losses in their final three games of the season including a 4–0 loss to the eventual champions in the penultimate game, Tikvesh finished as runners-up to FK Pobeda Prilep in the Macedonian Republic League trailing by 4 points.

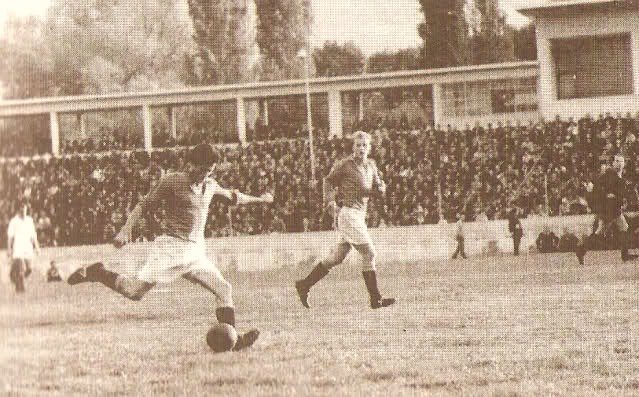
Atanas Trajkovski and Vuko Karov in attack, 1955–56

The 1954–55 season was successful for Tikvesh despite finishing third in the table in the Macedonian Republic League, level on points with Pobeda Prilep and just three points behind Metalec Skopje. They were promoted to the Yugoslav IV Zona (2nd tier football league in Yugoslavia at the time) for the first time in its existence. The club's stay in the Yugoslav IV Zona was short-lived as they were relegated the following season, together with Rabotnik Bitola, Borac Čačak and Bregalnica Shtip, while Vardar Skopje won the league and were promoted to the Yugoslav First League.

After relegation from the Yugoslav IV Zona, Tikvesh went on to win comfortably the Shtip Division in 1956–57 with some high-scoring road wins while registering 14 wins-2 draws-2 losses. Consistency followed in the next season, as the side led in attack by Vuko Karov and Blazho Malinkov finished as runners-up to Belasica Strumica in the Shtip Division only on goal difference.

In the early and mid 1960s Tikvesh were second-best on four occasions in the Macedonian Republic League (1962–63 – 1st FK Pobeda Prilep, 1964–65 – 1st FK Teteks Tetovo, 1965–66 – 1st FK Rabotnichki Skopje, 1967–68 – 1st FK Rabotnichki Skopje).

In 1967–68 Tikvesh finished as runners-up to Rabotnichki Skopje in the Macedonian Republic League, but had done enough to gain promotion to the Yugoslav Second League – East. In 1968–69 Tikvesh avoided relegation from the Yugoslav Second League – East and finished one point ahead of Ei Mladost Niš, securing survival with one game to go after a late run of good results. Angel Kimov and Gligor Totov combined for 18 league goals (Kimov 10 and Totov 8), while Miodrag Aleksić, a winter loan signing from FK Vojvodina scored 6 goals. They failed to establish themselves in the Yugoslav Second League – East and to avoid the drop in the 1969–70 season.

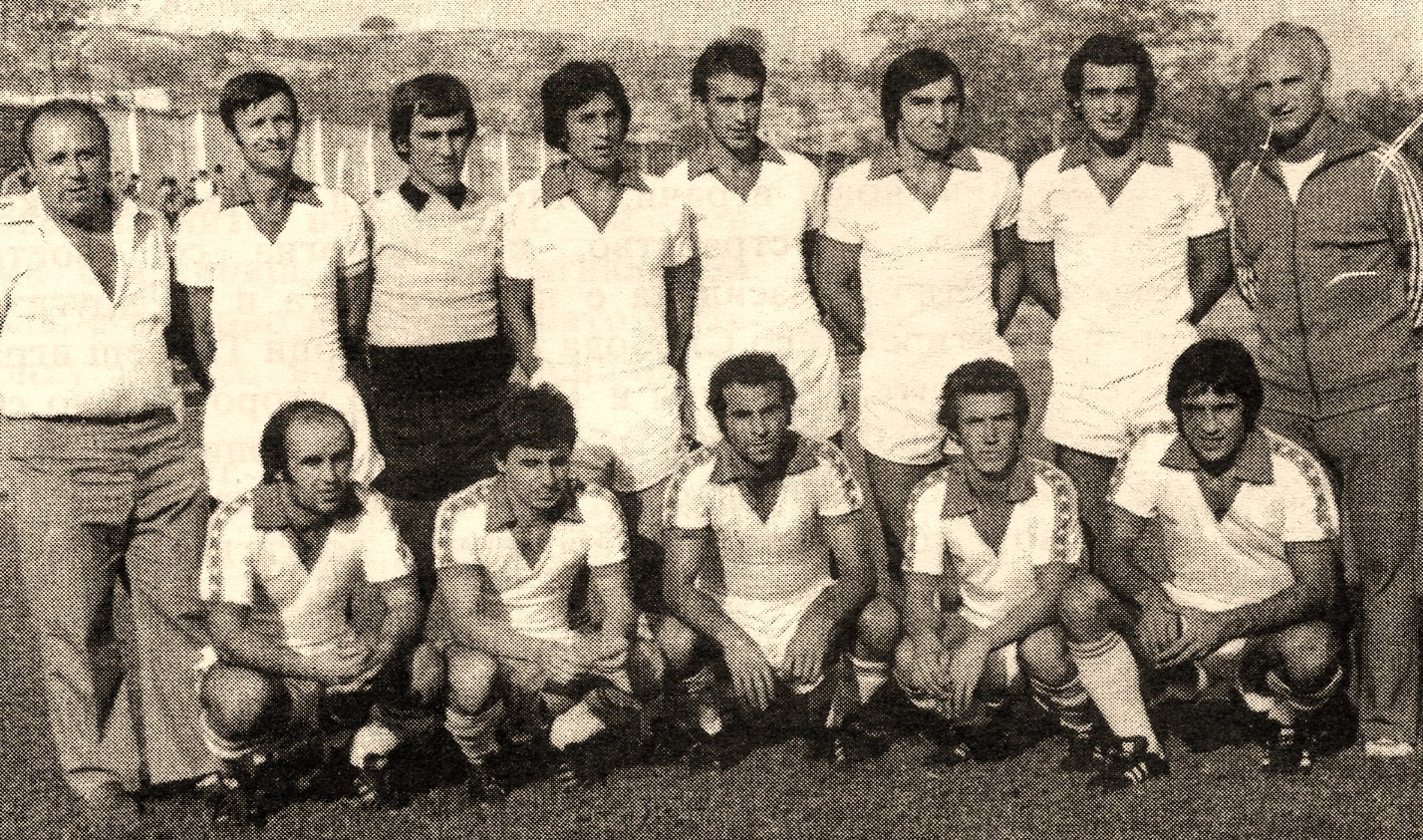
FK Tikvesh in late 1960s – Blazho Malinkov, Angel Kimov, Ordancho Milkov, Lazar Damevski, Dushko Popov, Borche Georgiev, Zlatko Milosovski, Nakjo Totovski, Ljupcho Icev, Trajche Nikolov, Krste Jovanov, Vitomir Stefanov, Cvetko Kabramov

=== Golden 1970s ===
Led by the renowned goalscorer Angel Kimov (Macedonian: Ангел Кимов) and under the guidance of manager Nakjo Totovski (Macedonian: Наќо Тотовски) Tikvesh claimed their first major honour in 1971–72 winning the Macedonian Republic League. The partnership of Kimov – Totov combined 36 goals throughout the season (Kimov 20 and Totov 16) to help Tikvesh win its first league title for 42 years and to get promotion to the Yugoslav Second League – East. In the next season, they returned to the Macedonian Republic League after finishing 15th out of 18 teams, a position that would have guaranteed survival in the previous seasons. But due to drastic changes in the Yugoslav football league system in 1973 Tikvesh were relegated from the Yugoslav Second League – East.

On their return to the Macedonian Republic League in 1973–74 Tikvesh achieved 3rd place whilst in the next season (1974–75) they went one place better and finished as runners-up to FK Pelister Bitola.

Tikvesh won their second title in 1977–78 and with it came yet another promotion to the Yugoslav Second League – East. Angel Kimov scored 34 goals in 34 matches, which made him the league's top goalscorer, the only player to earn the honour in the club's history. The 1978–79 season saw Tikvesh compete in the Yugoslav Second League – East for the last time. After a promising start to the season including wins over Teteks (1–2), Dubočica (5–0), Jedinstvo (1–0), Sutjeska (3–0) and draws against Liria (2–2), Budućnost (0–0) their form dipped drastically and they were relegated to the Macedonian Republic League, Vardar Skopje were promoted as champions to the Yugoslav First League, a recurring scenario of 1955–56 season.

In the 12-year period from 1967 to 1979, Tikvesh competed for four seasons in the Yugoslav Second League (1968–69, 1969–70, 1972–73 and 1978–79), were Macedonian champions twice (1971–72 and 1977–78), finished as runners-up twice (1967–68 and 1974–75) and sustained one third-place finish (1973–74).

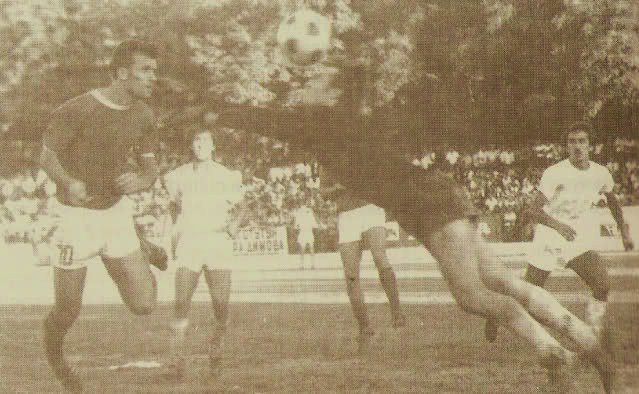
Angel Kimov (left), Tikvesh's all-time leading goalscorer, played for Tikvesh from 1966 – 1979

=== 1980s decline ===
After the successful 1970s the club's fortunes declined in the 1980s. In 1980–81, despite beginning the season as one of the favourites to win the title Tikvesh suffered an unprecedented run of poor results, culminating in their first-ever relegation to the Macedonian Republic 2nd division, bringing to a close one of the most successful periods in Tikvesh's history. For two consecutive seasons they failed to achieve promotion, Tikvesh struggled in 1981–82 and 1982–83 only finishing 4th and 5th in the table respectively. In the meantime Petar Angjushev (Macedonian: Петар Анѓушев) guided FK Bor Kavadarci to back-to-back promotions. FK Bor have won the Macedonian Republic 3rd division in 1981–82, and in 1982–83 they stormed the Macedonian Republic 2nd division winning promotion to the Macedonian Republic League at their first attempt. In their title run in 1982–83 FK Bor won 3–1 and drew 2–2 against Tikvesh, the only time in which two teams from Kavadarci faced each other in any of the top two football divisions. During the summer of 1983, after FK Bor were promoted to the Macedonian Republic League the two clubs from Kavadarci merged and FK Tikvesh continued to play in the Macedonian Republic League. Over the next few years, their form fluctuated greatly, 5th in 1983–84, 9th in 1984–85, rising to 4th in 1985–86 before dropping to 17th two seasons later in 1987–88 which meant another relegation to the Macedonian Republic 2nd division. Tikvesh achieved an instant promotion in 1988–89, followed by a 3rd-place finish in the Macedonian Republic League in 1989–90, their best season and highest league placing in a decade.

All-Time Table, Yugoslav 2nd League 1947–1992 (Macedonian teams only)
	Club	P	W	D	L	GF	GA	GD	PTS
1	FK Pobeda Prilep	662	245	160	257	893	930	−37	650
2	FK Teteks Tetovo	560	209	140	211	629	680	−51	558
3	FK Rabotnichki Skopje	414	146	83	185	577	687	−110	375
4	FK Vardar Skopje	286	156	57	73	485	281	+204	369
5	FK Pelister Bitola	350	143	69	138	456	408	+48	355
6	FK Bregalnica Shtip	358	100	96	162	351	554	−203	296
7	FK Belasica Strumica	174	54	46	74	186	246	−60	154
8	FK 11 Oktomvri Kumanovo	156	47	36	73	144	259	−115	130
9	FK Tikvesh Kavadarci	124	23	35	66	119	221	−102	81
10	FK MIK Skopje	64	21	8	35	78	114	−36	50
11	FK Metalurg Skopje	34	9	12	13	34	45	−11	30
12	FK Balkan Skopje	36	9	8	19	23	57	−34	26

=== 1990s and the new century ===
After the breakup of Yugoslavia in 1991, Tikvesh were one of the founding members of the Macedonian First League, the top-level professional football league in Macedonia. In the inaugural season they finished 7th in the table. A succession of managers followed, but despite well-known signings (such as Dejvi Glavevski, Dzhevdet Shainovski, Sasho Karadzhov, Arbnor Morina, Vlado Šuvak, Đorđe Iskić) Tikvesh failed to achieve any significant results, never breaking into the top four and therefore failing to qualify for European competition.

Bankruptcy and rejuvenation

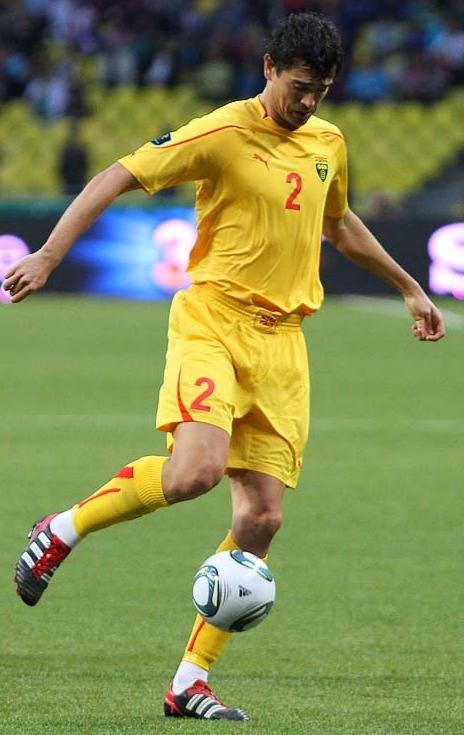
Former youth player Vanche Shikov

In 2000–01 Tikvesh were relegated from the Macedonian First League for the first time, they recorded the Macedonian First League lowest ever points total, going through an entire season with only one win. With a drastic improvement in form the following season Tikvesh made an immediate return to the top-flight by winning the Macedonian Second League.

In a turbulent 2002–03 Tikvesh saw four different managers through the course of the season in the Macedonian First League. Despite promising performances during the first half of the season Perica Gruevski resigned as manager on 8 November 2002, citing the bad financial situation at the club as the main reason for his departure. His assistant Lazar Iliev was appointed as a caretaker manager, and took the helm until the winter break. On 16 January 2003 Tikvesh announced that they had appointed Blagoja Kitanovski as new head coach, who only held the position for three months and resigned in April 2003. On 28 April 2003 Nikola Gligorov was appointed as the new manager of Tikvesh. After a good start of the 2002–03 season Tikvesh comfortably avoided relegation. However, in the 2003–04 season they were relegated from the Macedonian First League for the second time in four years. Following this relegation from the Macedonian First League Tikvesh fell into serious financial difficulties, and a downward spiral set in.

2004–05 saw Tikvesh experience a second consecutive relegation, placing them in the Macedonian Third League – South. They finished the 2004–05 season in 10th place (3rd from bottom) but lost the relegation play-off game to FK Karaorman Struga played at a neutral venue at Philip II Arena on 19 June 2005. The 90 minutes ended with a 0–0 draw and after 30 minutes of extra time Tikvesh lost 3–1. Shortly afterwards in 2006–07 season the club went into bankruptcy.

Eventually the club was rejuvenated under the name of FK Tikvesh Nacional (Macedonian: ФК Тиквеш Национал). They started competing in the Regional League – OFL Kavadarci, 4th tier football league in Macedonia, achieving promotion at the first attempt in 2007–08. In 2008–09 FK Tikvesh Nacional played in the Macedonian Third League – South and finished the season in 5th place.

In the summer of 2009 the Kavadarci Municipality Council took control of the club and changed the name to Gradski Fudbalski Klub Tikvesh (City's Football Club Tikvesh; Macedonian: ГФК Тиквеш). In 2009–10 they won the Macedonian Third League – South and were promoted as champions.

In 2010–11 Tikvesh made a promising start to the season in the Macedonian Second League, but in the end they finished 3rd in the table and narrowly missed the chance to be promoted to the Macedonian First League. They lost 2–0 to FK Napredok Kichevo in the play-off final at Gjorche Petrov Stadium in Skopje. In the same season Tikvesh had their best Cup run. After defeating FK Drita 2–1 in the first round and FK Osogovo 3–1 on aggregate in the second round, in the quarter-final Tikvesh overcame a 4–1 first-leg deficit to defeat FK Vardar, a 4–0 win at home in the second-leg made it 5–4 on aggregate, and Tikvesh went through to the semi-finals where they eventually lost to FK Teteks over two legs (0–0; 0–6).

After the first half of the season in 2011–12, Tikvesh went into the winter break only 3 points behind the league leaders FK Drita. But they had started poorly in the second half of the season and on 25 March 2012 Metodija Sapundzhiev resigned as manager after three consecutive defeats. Nikola Gligorov was appointed as new manager, and in the end they finished 7th in the table.

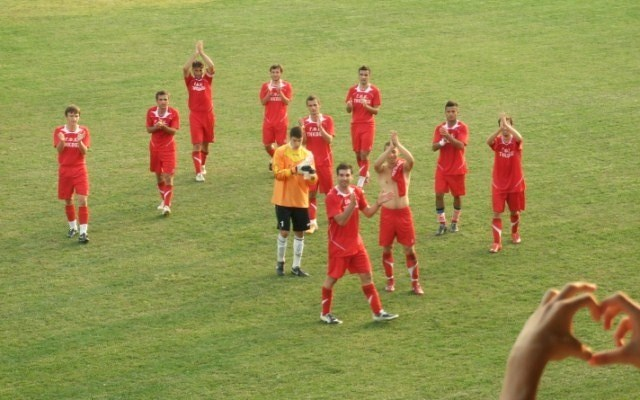
Tikvesh players salute their fans, 2011–12

After a below-average start to the 2012–13 season, 1 win-3 draws-2 losses, Tikvesh dismissed manager Nikola Gligorov on 25 September 2012 and Blagoja Kitanovski was appointed as his successor, but he stayed only until the winter break and left the club. This was Kitanovski's third short spell in Tikvesh, he previously coached the team in 2000 and 2003. The club's precarious financial situation was obvious, and during the winter break most of the first team players left. Nikola Gligorov returned as manager and Tikvesh continued the season with players from the youth categories. With the lack of experience in the squad Tikvesh were unable to secure survival and were relegated to the Macedonian Third League – South. The 2012–13 season also saw the supporters' campaign (For better Tikvesh; Macedonian: За подобар Тиквеш) against the club's board of directors. They were increasingly convinced that the board was lacking ambition and football knowledge, sarcastically nicknaming the board – The Visionaries. 1930 supporters signed a petition demanding the board to step down, although there were greater levels of interest the decision was made to hand over the petition with only 1930 signatures because this number is representative of the year of Tikvesh's foundation.

Tikvesh's crisis deepened in 2013–14 season. The relations between the club's board of directors and the players (backed by the fans) deteriorated, subsequently leading to players' revolt and boycott of the matches. On 9 October 2013 the FFM expelled Tikvesh from the Macedonian Third League – South after they refused to play against FK Mlekar and FK Topolchani.

After a tumultuous summer and a newly assembled board of directors, Tikvesh begun the 2014–15 season competing in the lowest rank of Macedonian football. They won the league and gained promotion to the Macedonian Third League – South through play-off matches, winning comfortably 8–0 and 3–0 against FK Gemidhzii and FK Kozhuf respectively.

In 2015–16 season Tikvesh finished in 3rd place in the Third League – South. Due to the withdrawal of FK Ljubanci and FK Mladost Carev Dvor, the club was admitted to the Second League, which saw them returning to the second rank of the Macedonian football after three years' absence.

Tikvesh's starting line-up against Sileks in 2020–21 play-off final. (coach: Pane Blazhevski).

=== The battle for promotion to the top tier and loss in the play-offs ===
Tikvesh entered the 2018–19 season with a serious ambition for promotion to the top-flight, but following an inconsistent start their automatic promotion bid fell short in the end as they finished as runners-up to FK Borec Veles, and only managed to qualify for the play-offs. On 2 June 2019, in heavy rain, in a match played at Gjorche Petrov Stadium in Skopje, Tikvesh defeated FK Labunishta 6–3 in the play-off semi-final and reached the final. But on 5 June 2019, with only 3 days for recovery while having an extended injury list Tikvesh narrowly lost (3–2) the play-off final to FK Sileks Kratovo.

=== Return to the top flight ===
On 25 May 2021, after 17 years in the lower divisions Tikvesh finally secured promotion back to the Macedonian First League. They finished 2020–21 season 2nd on the table and qualified for the promotion play-off finals, where once again FK Sileks Kratovo was their opponent. The match took place at National Arena Toshe Proeski in Skopje and Tikvesh won the match 1-0 courtesy of an Ediz Spahiu goal early in the second half.

Following the promotion, Tikvesh achieved a second consecutive play-off final win in 2021–22. They finished the season in 10th place, and on 22 May 2022 defeated Voska Sport 4-1 in the final played at Blagoj Istatov Stadium in Strumica. Ediz Spahiu scored twice, while Ivan Ivanovski and Blagoja Ljamchevski scored one goal each, helping Tikvesh to a comfortable win after a speculative and controversial 5 days leading to the final. The FFM was forced to change the host city after an initial decision of Goce Delchev Stadium in Prilep to be hosting the final.

=== Highest league position and first major trophy ===

Tikvesh's starting line-up against Voska Sport in 2023–24 Cup final. (coach: Gjorgji Mojsov).

In 2023–24 Tikvesh finished 4th in the league, which was their highest ever finish in the top division. However, the biggest success for the club was in the Macedonian Football Cup. On 22 May 2024, for the first time in its history Tikvesh won the Cup, defeating Voska Sport 2-1 in the final, and qualified for the 2024–25 UEFA Conference League.

== Colours ==
The club's colours have traditionally been red and white. In the early years Tikvesh played in red and white striped shirts, but for much of its history they played in red shirts with white collar or white V-neck. In the mid-90s Tikvesh played a couple of seasons in red and white hooped shirts as well.

Early years	Traditional kit	Mid-90s

== Crest ==
Throughout the years Tikvesh have had two main crests.

The current crest, also used until the early 1990s is a green vine-leaf on a white background, surrounded by red lines, and the name of the club written with green letters on the top. The vine-leaf represents the Tikvesh region famous for its vineyards, while red and white are the official colours of the club and the colours of Kavadarci.

== Stadium ==
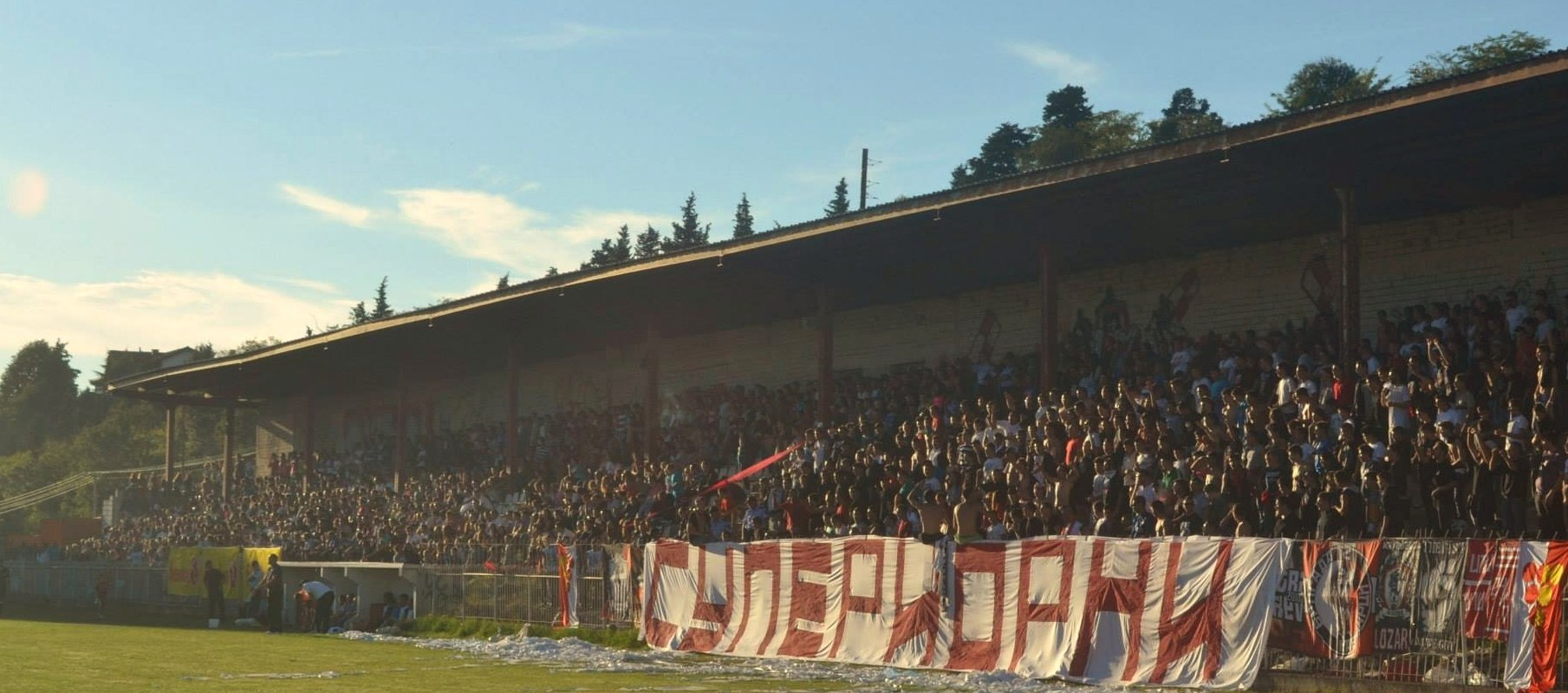
City Stadium Kavadarci, North Stand

Tikvesh's home ground is the City Stadium of Kavadarci (Macedonian: Градски Стадион Кавадарци). The stadium was built in the late 1940s and the first match played was on 19 March 1950 between FK Tikvesh and NK Rudar Trbovlje from Slovenia, qualification for the Yugoslav Third League, the final score was 1–4 for the visitors from Slovenia. The stadium has hosted the first Macedonia U-21 international fixture, a 7–0 win over Estonia U-21 played on 31 May 1994, also the Macedonian Cup final between FK Sileks and FK Sloga Jugomagnat (4–1) on 28 May 1997.

Although used primarily for football, the stadium has hosted many concerts in the past as well.

== Supporters ==
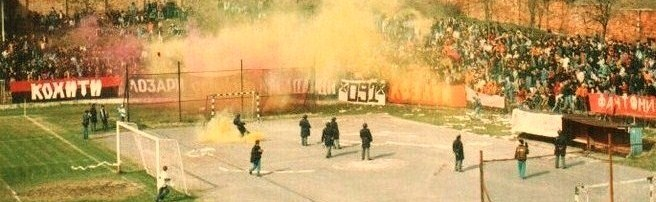
Lozari at the East Stand during derby match, 28 March 1993, Tikvesh 3–0 Pelister

Tikvesh's organized supporters are known as Lozari (Winegrowers; Macedonian: Лозари), they were formed in 1991 and traditionally occupy the East Stand at the stadium. Lozari have good relations with Chkembari, supporters of FK Pelister Bitola.

Tikvesh is one of the clubs with the highest average home attendance in the Macedonian First League.

== Rivalry ==
Tikvesh's fiercest rival is FK Vardar Negotino. The matches between the two clubs are known as the Winegrowers Derby, and they are keenly contested affairs with considerable pride at stake that goes far beyond football. The derby is an inter-town rivalry, with the two towns of Kavadarci and Negotino just 10 km (6 miles) apart. The derby is seldom played because in many seasons the two clubs have played in separate divisions of the league system. Whenever played, the derby attracts large crowds. In many seasons Tikvesh have been in a superior division to their neighbours, and statistically are by far the more successful of the two clubs who have still not faced each other in the Macedonian First League. Despite numerous previous "friendly" encounters, the first official league meeting between the clubs took place on 22 March 1953 in Negotino, which ended in a 1–1 draw. The highest-scoring Winegrowers league derby was played in 1961–62 when Tikvesh won 6–4. while biggest win is Tikvesh's 5–0 victory in 1973–74.

== Players ==
As of 3 August 2026

=== First team ===
Note: Flags indicate national team as defined under FIFA eligibility rules; some limited exceptions apply. Players may hold more than one non-FIFA nationality.

No.	Pos.	Nation	Player
1	GK	MKD	Hristijan Stevkovski
2	MF	GUI	Fode Camara
3	DF	MKD	Stefan Sekirski
4	DF	CMR	Ibrahima Fall
6	DF	ALB	Besir Ramadani (vice-captain)
7	FW	BRA	Lucianinho
8	MF	MKD	Oktaj Rakipi
11	FW	GUI	N'fanly Sylla
12	GK	MKD	Antonij Trajkovski
15	MF	MKD	Teodor Nikolovski
17	FW	MKD	Gjoko Spasov
19	FW	MKD	Blagoj Stojchev
21	DF	MKD	Aleksandar Varelovski (captain)
22	FW	NGR	Toheeb Lawal
23	MF	NGR	Wisdom Okere

No.	Pos.	Nation	Player
24	DF	MKD	Jovan Popzlatanov
25	MF	MKD	Sudejs Chajani
27	MF	MKD	Dejan Siljanoski
29	FW	MKD	Rade Rajchinovski
32	DF	SRB	Nikola Vlajković
34	MF	MKD	Kristijan Ackovski
44	DF	MKD	Andrija Dimeski
66	DF	MKD	Milosh Spasovski
74	DF	BRA	Renatinho
77	FW	MKD	David Golubov
80	MF	MKD	Muhamed Elmas
88	GK	MKD	Marko Alchevski
92	FW	ALB	Besar Guxhufi
99	FW	NGR	Lukman Oluwadamilare Adeshina

=== Retired numbers ===
Note: Flags indicate national team as defined under FIFA eligibility rules; some limited exceptions apply. Players may hold more than one non-FIFA nationality.

No.	Pos.	Nation	Player
16	MF	MKD	Andrej Lazarov (2025 – posthumous honour)

=== Current technical staff ===
As of 1 August 2026

Position	Name
Head coach	(Slovenia) Oliver Bogatinov
Assistant coach	(North Macedonia) Angjel Temelkov
Assistant coach	(North Macedonia) Metodi Sapundjiev
Goalkeeper coach	(North Macedonia) Stojan Dimovski
Fitness coach	(North Macedonia) Trajche Oreshkov
Physiotherapist	(North Macedonia) Petar Arsov
Doctor	(North Macedonia) Mitko Gjorgjiev
Security person	(North Macedonia) Sashko Lazov
Administrator	(North Macedonia) Ivan Gjorgjievski
Club representative	(North Macedonia) Todor Turimandjov

== Notable former players ==
To appear in this section a player must have either:

- Has been part of a Tikvesh team which won a league trophy (Macedonian First League).
- Set a club record or won an individual award while at the club.
- Has been a long term club captain.
- Has been part of the Macedonia national football team or other national football team in any official match.
- (North Macedonia) Risto Joskov - Topot
- (North Macedonia) Vuko Karov
- (North Macedonia) Petar Angjushev
- (North Macedonia) Angel Kimov
- (North Macedonia) Gligor Totov
- (North Macedonia) Angel Nastev
- (North Macedonia) Nikola Kamchev
- (North Macedonia) Blazho Malinkov
- (North Macedonia) Tome Hadzhivasilev
- (North Macedonia) Ordancho Milkov
- (North Macedonia) Pane Nedev
- (North Macedonia) Branko Boshkovski
- (North Macedonia) Blagoj Boshkovski
- (North Macedonia) Borche Mitrev
- (North Macedonia) Dejvi Glavevski
- (North Macedonia) Dzhevdet Shainovski
- (North Macedonia) Daniel Mojsov
- (North Macedonia) Vanche Shikov
- (North Macedonia) Milovan Petrovikj

== Notable former coaches ==
- (North Macedonia) Nakjo Totovski
- (North Macedonia) Trajche Kovachev
- (North Macedonia) Andon Donchevski
- (Serbia) Svetozar Gođevac
- (North Macedonia) Perica Gruevski
- (North Macedonia) Blagoja Kitanovski

== Honours and achievements ==
Honours	No.	Years
(North Macedonia) Macedonian Cup: Champions	1	2023–24
(Socialist Republic of Macedonia) Macedonian Republic League: Champions	2	1971–72, 1977–78
(Socialist Republic of Macedonia) Macedonian Republic League: Runners-up	6	1953–54, 1962–63, 1964–65, 1965–66, 1967–68, 1974–75
(Socialist Republic of Macedonia) Macedonian Republic League – Shtip Division: Winners	2	1952–53, 1956–57
(Socialist Republic of Macedonia) Macedonian Republic League – Shtip Division: Runners-up	1	1957–58
(North Macedonia) Macedonian Second League: Champions	1	2001–02
(North Macedonia) Macedonian Third League – South: Champions	1	2009–10
(North Macedonia) OFL Kavadarci: Champions	2	2007–08, 2014–15

=== Macedonian Cup ===
Tikvesh won the Macedonian Football Cup in the 2023–24 season.

- R1 = first round / R2 = second round
- QF = quarter-finals / SF = semi-finals
- F = final
- h = home / a = away
- p = penalty shoot-out

Season	Round	Club	Score
2023–24	R1	FK Arsimi Chegrane	2–1 (a)
	R2	FK Pelister Bitola	1–0 (a)
	QF	FK AP Brera Strumica	1–1 (6–5 p) (h)
	SF	FK Shkupi	0–0 (a), 0–0 (5–3 p) (h)
	F	FK Voska Sport	2–1 (n)

== Recent seasons ==
Season	League									Cup	European competitions	
Season	Division	P	W	D	L	F	A	Pts	Pos	Cup	European competitions	
1992–93	1. MFL	34	12	10	12	52	50	34	7th			
1993–94	1. MFL	30	9	8	13	31	42	26	11th			
1994–95	1. MFL	30	11	4	15	35	53	37	11th	R2		
1995–96	1. MFL	28	8	8	12	37	46	32	10th			
1996–97	1. MFL	26	8	8	10	33	39	32	11th	R2		
1997–98	1. MFL	25	7	8	10	23	27	29	11th	R2		
1998–99	1. MFL	26	10	6	10	34	37	36	7th			
1999–00	1. MFL	26	9	4	13	37	54	31	8th	R1		
2000–01	1. MFL	26	1	0	25	12	110	3	14th ↓	R1		
2001–02	2. MFL	34	25	4	5	99	25	79	1st ↑	QF		
2002–03	1. MFL	33	11	4	18	37	58	37	9th	QF		
2003–04	1. MFL	33	5	4	24	25	61	19	11th ↓	QF		
2004–05	2. MFL	33	9	4	20	36	55	31	10th ↓	R2		
2005–06	3. MFL South	The club have withdrawn from the league							n/a	PR		
2006–07	3. MFL South	22	9	1	12	37	38	25^{(−3)}	8th ↓	R1		
2007–08	OFL Kavadarci	16	14	1	1	82	20	43	1st ↑	PR		
2008–09	3. MFL South	22	11	3	8	46	34	36	4th	PR		
2009–10	3. MFL South	26	23	2	1	94	15	71	1st ↑	PR		
2010–11	2. MFL	26	13	9	4	45	27	48	3rd	SF		
2011–12	2. MFL	30	13	6	11	45	41	45	7th	R2		
2012–13	2. MFL	30	4	7	19	24	76	19	15th ↓	R1		
2013–14	3. MFL South	FFM expelled Tikvesh from the league							↓	PR		
2014–15	OFL Kavadarci	17	16	0	1	72	19	48	1st ↑	PR		
2015–16	3. MFL South	22	12	4	6	40	23	40	3rd ↑	PR		
2016–17	2. MFL	27	9	1	17	25	53	28	7th	PR		
2017–18	2. MFL East	25	12	2	11	45	43	37	5th	R1		
2018–19	2. MFL East	27	16	9	2	47	16	57	2nd	R2		
2019–20^{1}	2. MFL East	16	9	4	3	30	12	31	3rd	N/A		
2020–21	2. MFL East	27	18	7	2	59	23	61	2nd ↑	R1		
2021–22	1. MFL	33	9	7	17	36	38	34	10th	R2		
2022–23	1. MFL	30	11	7	12	40	37	40	6th	R2		
2023–24	1. MFL	33	12	8	13	41	40	44	4th	W		
2024–25	1. MFL	33	7	13	13	25	33	34	8th	R2	Conference League	QR1
2025–26	1. MFL	33	14	6	13	59	47	48	5th	R2		

^{1}The 2019–20 season was abandoned due to the COVID-19 pandemic.

== European record ==
Season	Competition	Round	Club	Home	Away	Agg.
2024–25	UEFA Conference League	1QR	(Iceland) Breiðablik	3–2	1–3	4–5

Notes

- QR: Qualifying round

== Records ==
Most Goals:

No.	Name	League goals
1	Angel Kimov	194
2	Blazho Malinkov	89
3	Vuko Karov	79
4	Gligor Totov	77
5	Boro Klashev	73

Most league goals by a player in one season:

No.	Name	Goals	Season
1	Angel Kimov	34	1977–78
2	Boro Klashev	21	1964–65
–	Slobodan Tasev	21	1991–92

Most goals by a player in one match:

No.	Name	Goals	Match	Season
1	Angel Kimov	6	Tikvesh 9–0 Astibo Shtip	1971–72
2	Vuko Karov	5	Tikvesh 9–0 Malesh Berovo	1956–57
–	Dime Lazov	5	Tikvesh 6–1 ZIK Novaci	1989–90

== Vuko Karov Tournament ==
An annual International Memorial Tournament has been held in Kavadarci since 1993 in honour and memory of Tikvesh's former player and president Vuko Karov (5 September 1931 – 6 June 1990). The tournament is considered to be the most prestigious friendly tournament in Macedonia. The knockout format depends on the number of participants. In most of the editions the tournament has been the traditional four-team, two-days event, Single-elimination tournament system with a Third place playoff taking place before the Final, or a Round-robin tournament with three teams, 45 minutes per match.

The first Vuko Karov Tournament took place on 27–28 February 1993, first teams to participate were Tikvesh, Vardar, Pobeda and SAK Klagenfurt. Vardar defeated Tikvesh in the final 3–0 and became the first winner, while Ljupcho Markovski was chosen as the tournament MVP.

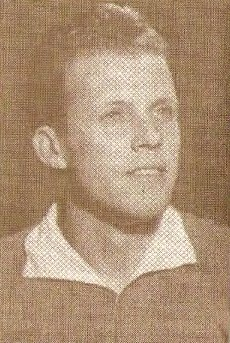
Vuko Karov

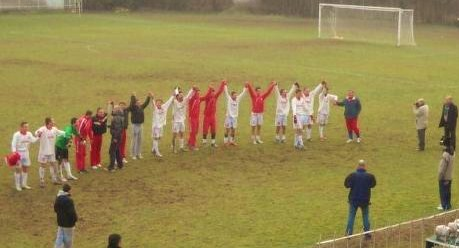
Tikvesh players celebrate their first 'Vuko Karov' trophy, 27 February 2011

Edition	Year	Winner	Runner-up	Third
1	1993	(North Macedonia) Vardar	(North Macedonia) Tikvesh	(Austria) SAK Klagenfurt
2	1994	(North Macedonia) Pobeda	(North Macedonia) Tikvesh	(North Macedonia) Vardar
3	1995	(North Macedonia) Osogovo	(North Macedonia) Sileks	(North Macedonia) Tikvesh
4	1996	(North Macedonia) Sileks	(Federal Republic of Yugoslavia) Čukarički Stankom	(North Macedonia) Sloga Jugomagnat
5	1997	(North Macedonia) Sileks	(North Macedonia) Tikvesh	(Federal Republic of Yugoslavia) Čukarički Stankom
6	1998	(Federal Republic of Yugoslavia) Partizan Belgrade	(North Macedonia) Tikvesh	(North Macedonia) Vardar
7	1999	(North Macedonia) Vardar	(North Macedonia) Tikvesh	(North Macedonia) Sloga Jugomagnat
8	2000	(North Macedonia) Pobeda	(Federal Republic of Yugoslavia) Partizan Belgrade	(Bulgaria) Pirin (B)
9	2001	(North Macedonia) Pobeda	(Federal Republic of Yugoslavia) Teleoptik	(North Macedonia) Osogovo
10	2002	(North Macedonia) Pobeda	(North Macedonia) Tikvesh	(Federal Republic of Yugoslavia) Teleoptik
11	2003	(Serbia and Montenegro) Budućnost BD	(North Macedonia) Napredok	(Serbia and Montenegro) Teleoptik
12	2006	(North Macedonia) Vardar	(North Macedonia) Kozhuf	(North Macedonia) Tikvesh
13	2010	(North Macedonia) Sileks	(North Macedonia) Renova	(North Macedonia) Tikvesh
14	2011	(North Macedonia) Tikvesh	(North Macedonia) Vardar	(North Macedonia) Pelister
15	2012	(Bulgaria) Vihren Sandanski	(North Macedonia) Sileks	(North Macedonia) Tikvesh
16	2015	(North Macedonia) Turnovo	(North Macedonia) Pobeda	(North Macedonia) Tikvesh
17	2016	(North Macedonia) Pobeda	(North Macedonia) Tikvesh	(North Macedonia) Ljubanci
18	2017	(North Macedonia) Pobeda	(North Macedonia) Tikvesh	(North Macedonia) Borec
19	2018	(North Macedonia) Gorno Lisiche	(North Macedonia) Tikvesh	(North Macedonia) Teteks
20	2019	(North Macedonia) Belasica	(North Macedonia) Rabotnichki	(North Macedonia) Tikvesh
21	2021	(North Macedonia) Pobeda	(North Macedonia) Tikvesh	(North Macedonia) Vardar
22	2022	(North Macedonia) Pelister	(North Macedonia) Pobeda	(North Macedonia) Tikvesh
23	2023	(North Macedonia) Tikvesh	(North Macedonia) Gostivar	(North Macedonia) Kozhuf
24	2024	(North Macedonia) Tikvesh	(North Macedonia) Rabotnichki	(North Macedonia) Bregalnica Shtip
25	2025	(North Macedonia) Tikvesh	(North Macedonia) Vardar Negotino	(North Macedonia) Teteks
26	2026	(North Macedonia) Tikvesh (foreign players)	(North Macedonia) Tikvesh (homegrown players)	(North Macedonia) Teteks

- Tournament not held in 2004, 2005, 2007, 2008, 2009, 2013, 2014 and 2020

== See also ==
- List of Macedonian football champions

== Bibliography ==
Books

- Karovski, Ilija; (1996) (in Macedonian). ФК Тиквеш 1930–1995 (FK Tikvesh 1930–1995).
