= Dževdet Šainovski =

Macedonian footballer and manager (born 1973)

Personal information
- Full name: Dževdet Šainoski; Џевдет Шаиноски; Xhevdet Shahini
- Date of birth: 8 June 1973 (age 53)
- Place of birth: Ohrid, SR Macedonia, SFR Yugoslavia
- Height: 1.80 m (5 ft 11 in)
- Position: Midfielder

Team information
- Current team: BK Frem Academy (Manager)

Youth career
- Ohrid

Senior career*
| Years | Team | Apps | (Gls) |
| 1992–1994 | Tikvesh | 60 | (9) |
| 1994–1997 | Vardar | 47 | (6) |
| 1997–1999 | NEC | 31 | (2) |
| 1999–2000 | Hannover 96 | 7 | (0) |
| 2000–2001 | B 93 | 8 | (3) |
| 2001–2004 | FC Nordsjælland | 36 | (11) |
| 2004 | Malmö Anadolu BI | 13 | (1) |
| 2004–2006 | Ølstykke | 22 | (2) |
| 2006–2007 | AB 70 | | |
| 2007–2009 | Fodboldklubben Prespa | | |

International career
| 1997–2002 | Macedonia | 26 | (2) |

Managerial career
- 2006–2007: AB 70 (assistant)
- 2007–2009: Fodboldklubben Prespa
- 2009–2010: BK Frem (assistant)
- 2011–2012: Handelsstandens Boldklub (assistant)
- 2012–2019: Handelsstandens Boldklub
- 2017–2018: B.93 (U18 women)
- 2019: Herlev IF
- 2020–2021: Liria FK
- 2021: Hillerød Fodbold (youth)
- 2021–24: Farum BK
- 2024: Frederikssund IF
- 2025–: BK Frem Academy (U14)
- * Club domestic league appearances and goals

Dževdet Šainovski (Macedonian: Џевдет Шаиноски; Albanian: Xhevdet Shahini; born 8 June 1973 in Ohrid) is a Macedonian football midfielder and manager, currently in charge of BK Frem's under-14 Academy team.

== International career ==
He made his senior debut for Macedonia in a March 1997 friendly match against Australia and has earned a total of 26 caps, scoring 2 goals. His final international was a March 2002 friendly against Bosnia and Herzegovina.

=== International goals ===
| # | Date | Venue | Opponent | Score | Result | Competition |
|---|---|---|---|---|---|---|
| 1. | 29 September 1998 | Gradski Stadion, Kumanovo, Macedonia | Egypt | 2–2 | Draw | Friendly |
| 2. | 14 October 1998 | Stadion Maksimir, Zagreb, Croatia | Croatia | 3–2 | Loss | Euro 2000 qualifying |
Correct as of 13 January 2017
