= Jovan Ilić (footballer) =

Bosnian association football player

Personal information
- Full name: Jovan Ilić
- Date of birth: 30 January 2000 (age 26)
- Place of birth: Bijeljina, Bosnia and Herzegovina
- Height: 1.76 m (5 ft 9 in)
- Position: Defensive midfielder

Team information
- Current team: Radnički 1923
- Number: 80

Youth career
- 2012–2018: Red Star Belgrade
- 2018: Grafičar Beograd
- 2018–2019: Brodarac

Senior career*
Years	Team	Apps	(Gls)
2019–2020	Brodarac	14	(11)
2020–2022	Proleter Novi Sad	56	(2)
2020	→ Brodarac (loan)	5	(1)
2022–2023	RFK Novi Sad	18	(6)
2022–2023	Tobol	24	(2)
2024	RFK Novi Sad	12	(0)
2024	Shakhter Karagandy	10	(0)
2025–	Radnički 1923	28	(2)
2026	→ Napredak Kruševac (loan)	13	(0)

International career^{‡}
2021–2022	Bosnia and Herzegovina U21	5	(0)
- * Club domestic league appearances and goals as of 15 June 2025 ‡ National team caps and goals as of 29 March 2022

Jovan Ilić (Serbian Cyrillic: Јован Илић; born 30 January 2000) is a Bosnian professional footballer who plays as a defensive midfielder for Serbian SuperLiga club Radnički 1923.

== Club career ==
Born in Bijeljina, Bosnia and Herzegovina, Jovan is a product of the Serbian football club Red Star Belgrade.

On January 1, 2019, he signed a contract with the Serbian football club Brodarac.

On February 6, 2020, he moved to Proleter Novi Sad. On August 1, 2020, in a match against the club Rad, he made his debut in the Serbian SuperLiga, coming on as a substitute in the 76th minute instead of Danilo Bacanović. On October 21, 2020, in a match against the club Radnički Pirot, In Pirot made his debut in the Serbian Cup.

On July 1, 2022, he became a player of the Serbian club RFK Novi Sad.

On February 14, 2023, he signed a contract with the Kazakhstan club Tobol who, under the command of Serbian coach Milić Ćurčić, created a real sensation by eliminating the Swiss team Basel in the UEFA Conference League qualifiers last season.

On July 1, 2024, for the second time, he became a player of the Serbian club RFK Novi Sad.

On July 5, 2024, he became a new player of the Kazakhstan club Shakhter Karagandy.

On January 11, 2025, Radnički 1923 announced that they had signed a two-year contract with Ilić.

== International career ==
On March 29, 2021, he made his debut for the Bosnia and Herzegovina U21 team in a match against the Montenegro U21 team (2:2), coming on as a substitute in the 46th minute for Stefan Santrač.
