= Svarteborgs FK =

Swedish football club

- Full name: Svarteborgs FK
- Founded: 2012; 13 years ago
- Ground: Sjövallen, Hällevadsholm
- League: Division 5 Bohuslän
Home colours

Svarteborgs FK is a Swedish football club located in Hällevadsholm . The football Svarteborgs FC was founded in 1997 originated from clubs Dingle IF and Hällevadsholms SK. In 2012 club changed name for Svarteborg FK. In 2018 they relegated to Division 6, but next year they won division 6 and is now back in Division 5.
