= Issa Bah =

Guinean-born Luxembourgish footballer

Personal information
- Date of birth: 5 July 2002 (age 24)
- Place of birth: Conakry, Guinea
- Height: 1.81 m (5 ft 11 in)
- Position: Winger

Team information
- Current team: Radnički 1923
- Number: 77

Youth career
- 2017–2018: RM Hamm Benfica

Senior career*
Years	Team	Apps	(Gls)
2018–2019	RM Hamm Benfica	10	(1)
2019–2022	Progrès Niederkorn	26	(5)
2021–2022	→ Venezia (loan)	1	(0)
2022–2023	Venezia	0	(0)
2023–2025	Progrès Niederkorn	37	(11)
2025–	Radnički 1923	33	(6)

International career^{‡}
2017	Luxembourg U16	1	(2)
- * Club domestic league appearances and goals as of 5 June 2026 ‡ National team caps and goals as of 21:33, 25 April 2022 (UTC)

Issa Bah (born 5 July 2002) is a professional footballer who plays as a winger for Serbian SuperLiga club Radnički 1923. Born in Guinea, he is a youth international for Luxembourg.

== Club career ==
Bah began his senior career with the Luxembourgish club RM Hamm Benfica in 2018, before moving to Progrès Niederkorn in 2019. He joined Venezia on loan for the 2021–22 Serie A, signing on transfer deadline day on 31 August 2021. He made his professional debut with Venezia in a 3–1 Serie A loss to Atalanta on 23 April 2022, coming on as a late sub in the 81st minute. At the time he was the first Luxembourgish player of the Serie A.

On 28 May 2022, Bah moved to Venezia on a permanent basis.

== International career ==
Born in Guinea, Bah moved to Luxembourg at the age of 15. He debuted for the Luxembourg U16s in a 4–3 friendly win over the Belgium U16s on 9 November 2017, scoring a brace in the win.

== Honours ==
Individual

- Serbian SuperLiga Player of the Week: 2024–25 (Round 37)
