= Sava Paunović =

Yugoslav and Serbian football manager and player

Personal information
- Full name: Slavoljub Paunović
- Date of birth: 1 January 1947 (age 79)
- Place of birth: Kragujevac, FPR Yugoslavia
- Position: Forward

Youth career
- Maršić

Senior career*
Years	Team	Apps	(Gls)
1966–1976	Radnički Kragujevac	177+	(43+)
1976–1977	Partizan	32	(2)
1977–1979	Beşiktaş	55	(22)
1979–1983	Radnički Kragujevac	81	(10)
Total		345+	(77+)

Managerial career
- 1995: Radnički Kragujevac
- 1997–1998: Radnički Kragujevac
- 1999–2000: Radnički Kragujevac
- * Club domestic league appearances and goals

Slavoljub "Sava" Paunović (Serbian Cyrillic: Славољуб Сава Пауновић; born 1 January 1947) is a former Yugoslav and Serbian football manager and player.

== Playing career ==
Paunović started out at Radnički Kragujevac, helping the club win promotion to the Yugoslav First League on two occasions, in 1969 and 1974. He later played for Partizan in the 1976–77 season.

In 1977, Paunović moved abroad to Turkey, spending two seasons with Beşiktaş. He amassed 55 league appearances and scored 22 goals. In 1979, the Turkish Football Federation imposed a ban on foreign players in the league, causing Paunović to return to Yugoslavia and finish his career with Radnički Kragujevac.

== Managerial career ==
After hanging up his boots, Paunović served as manager of his former club Radnički Kragujevac on a few occasions.

== Career statistics ==
Appearances and goals by club, season and competition
Club	Season	League		
Club	Season	Division	Apps	Goals
Radnički Kragujevac	1966–67	Yugoslav Second League		
Radnički Kragujevac	1967–68	Yugoslav Second League		
Radnički Kragujevac	1968–69	Yugoslav Second League	30	13
Radnički Kragujevac	1969–70	Yugoslav First League	34	9
Radnički Kragujevac	1970–71	Yugoslav First League	34	10
Radnički Kragujevac	1971–72	Yugoslav First League	31	4
Radnički Kragujevac	1972–73	Yugoslav Second League		
Radnički Kragujevac	1973–74	Yugoslav Second League		
Radnički Kragujevac	1974–75	Yugoslav First League	24	6
Radnički Kragujevac	1975–76	Yugoslav First League	24	1
Radnički Kragujevac	Total		177	43
Partizan	1976–77	Yugoslav First League	32	2
Beşiktaş	1977–78	Turkish First Football League	27	8
Beşiktaş	1978–79	Turkish First Football League	28	14
Beşiktaş	Total		55	22
Radnički Kragujevac	1979–80	Yugoslav Second League	26	3
Radnički Kragujevac	1980–81	Yugoslav Second League	23	1
Radnički Kragujevac	1981–82	Yugoslav Second League	28	6
Radnički Kragujevac	1982–83	Yugoslav Second League	4	0
Radnički Kragujevac	Total		81	10
Career total			345	77

== Honours ==
Radnički Kragujevac

- Yugoslav Second League: 1968–69, 1973–74
