= 1976–77 FK Partizan season =

Partizan
1976–77 season
- President: Nikola Lekić
- Head coach: Tomislav Kaloperović (until 15 October 1976); Jovan Miladinović (until 31 December 1976); Ante Mladinić
- Yugoslav First League: 4th
- Yugoslav Cup: Round of 16
- European Cup: First round

The 1976–77 season was the 31st season in FK Partizan's existence. This article shows player statistics and matches that the club played during the 1976–77 season.

== Players ==
=== Squad information ===
Note: Flags indicate national team as defined under FIFA eligibility rules; some limited exceptions apply. Players may hold more than one non-FIFA nationality.

No.	Pos.	Nation	Player
—	GK	YUG	Petar Borota
—	GK	YUG	Radmilo Ivančević
—	GK	YUG	Rade Zalad
—	DF	YUG	Radomir Antić
—	DF	YUG	Dragan Arsenovic
—	DF	YUG	Borislav Đurović
—	DF	YUG	Ivan Golac
—	DF	YUG	Nikica Klinčarski
—	DF	YUG	Refik Kozić
—	DF	YUG	Rešad Kunovac
—	DF	YUG	Vlada Pejović
—	DF	YUG	Miodrag Radović
—	DF	YUG	Nenad Stojković

No.	Pos.	Nation	Player
—	DF	YUG	Predrag Tomić
—	MF	YUG	Jusuf Hatunić
—	MF	YUG	Miodrag Ješić
—	MF	YUG	Sava Paunović
—	MF	YUG	Miroslav Polak
—	MF	YUG	Dževad Prekazi
—	MF	YUG	Aleksandar Trifunović
—	MF	YUG	Momčilo Vukotić
—	FW	YUG	Boško Đorđević
—	FW	YUG	Pavle Grubješić
—	FW	YUG	Vukan Perović
—	FW	YUG	Ilija Zavišić

== Friendlies ==
14 August 1976 Friendly	Real Betis (Spain)	1–4	(Socialist Federal Republic of Yugoslavia) Partizan	Huelva, Spain
	45'		Paunović 5'; Hatunić 16'; Grubješić 41', 87'

15 August 1976 Friendly	Atlético Madrid (Spain)	1–1	(Socialist Federal Republic of Yugoslavia) Partizan	Huelva, Spain
	8'		Paunović 31'

8 February 1977 Friendly	Iraq	2–0	(Socialist Federal Republic of Yugoslavia) Partizan	Baghdad, Iraq

13 February 1977 Friendly	Istra (Socialist Federal Republic of Yugoslavia)	0–4	(Socialist Federal Republic of Yugoslavia) Partizan	Pula
			Zavišić; Paunović

20 February 1977 Friendly	Partizan (Socialist Federal Republic of Yugoslavia)	2–1	(Hungary) MTK Budapest	Titograd
	Zavišić 16', 45'			Stadium: Podgorica City Stadium; Attendance: 5,000; Referee: Stanišić

5 April 1977 Friendly	Politehnica Timișoara (Romania)	2–1	(Socialist Federal Republic of Yugoslavia) Partizan	Timișoara, Romania

== Competitions ==
=== Yugoslav First League ===
Pos	Team	Pld	W	D	L	GF	GA	GD	Pts	Qualification or relegation
2	Dinamo Zagreb	34	15	11	8	52	36	+16	41	Qualification for UEFA Cup first round
3	Sloboda Tuzla	34	14	11	9	43	32	+11	39	Qualification for UEFA Cup first round
4	Partizan	34	14	11	9	37	31	+6	39	
5	Rijeka	34	13	10	11	43	29	+14	36	Qualification for Balkans Cup and Qualification for Intertoto Cup
6	Borac Banja Luka	34	14	8	12	53	43	+10	36	

Source: rsssf.org
Rules for classification: 1) points; 2) goal difference; 3) number of goals scored.

22 August 1976 1	Borac Banja Luka	2–0	Partizan	Banja Luka
				Stadium: Banja Luka City Stadium; Attendance: 18,000; Referee: Rauš (Varaždin)

29 August 1976 2	Partizan	2–0	Velež	Belgrade
	Paunović 28'; Kunovac 66'			Stadium: Stadion JNA; Attendance: 30,000; Referee: Matovinović (Rijeka)

1 September 1976 3	Zagreb	2–0	Partizan	Zagreb
				Stadium: Stadion Maksimir; Attendance: 20,000; Referee: Nikić (Ljubljana)

5 September 1976 4	Napredak Kruševac	0–1	Partizan	Kruševac
			Grubješić 81'	Stadium: Mladost Stadium; Attendance: 30,000; Referee: Pavićević (Kragujevac)

11 September 1976 5	Partizan	3–2	OFK Beograd	Belgrade
	Grubješić 10', 25', 38'			Stadium: Stadion JNA; Attendance: 25,000; Referee: Nikolić (Sarajevo)

19 September 1976 6	Olimpija	4–2	Partizan	Ljubljana
			Klampfer 75' (o.g.); Perović 83'	Stadium: Bežigrad Stadium; Attendance: 18,000; Referee: Zrilić (Banja Luka)

2 October 1976 7	Partizan	1–0	Budućnost	Belgrade
	Grubješić 9' (pen.)			Stadium: Stadion JNA; Attendance: 17,000; Referee: Dimitrijević (Priština)

17 October 1976 8	Radnički Niš	2–0	Partizan	Niš
				Stadium: Čair Stadium; Attendance: 18,000; Referee: Marković

23 October 1976 9	Partizan	4–0	Željezničar	Belgrade
	Grubješić 53', 76', 83'; Zavišić 86'			Stadium: Stadion JNA; Attendance: 3,000; Referee: Horvat (Zagreb)

27 October 1976 10	Čelik	1–0	Partizan	Zenica
				Stadium: Bilino Polje Stadium; Attendance: 20,000; Referee: Slaviček (Zagreb)

31 October 1976 11	Partizan	1–0	Dinamo Zagreb	Belgrade
	Grubješić 37' (pen.)			Stadium: Stadion JNA; Attendance: 15,000; Referee: Ristić (Novi Sad)

7 November 1976 12	Crvena zvezda	1–0	Partizan	Belgrade
	Filipović 53'			Stadium: Marakana; Attendance: 100,000

13 November 1976 13	Partizan	1–1	Sloboda Tuzla	Belgrade
	Grubješić 39'			Stadium: Stadion JNA; Attendance: 8,000; Referee: Nikić (Ljubljana)

17 November 1976 14	Vojvodina	2–1	Partizan	Novi Sad
			Paunović 22'	Stadium: Karađorđe Stadium; Attendance: 20,000; Referee: Madžoski (Prilep)

21 November 1976 15	Partizan	1–0	Hajduk Split	Belgrade
	Kunovac 13'			Stadium: Stadion JNA; Attendance: 15,000; Referee: Manojlovski (Tetovo)

28 November 1976 16	Rijeka	1–1	Partizan	Rijeka
			Đorđević 70'	Stadium: Stadion Kantrida; Attendance: 8,000

5 December 1976 17	Partizan	3–0	Sarajevo	Belgrade
	Radović 16', 74'; Klinčarski 40'			Stadium: Stadion JNA; Attendance: 15,000; Referee: Slaviček (Zagreb)

6 March 1977 18	Partizan	0–0	Borac Banja Luka	Belgrade
				Stadium: Stadion JNA; Attendance: 25,000; Referee: Fresl (Samobor)

13 March 1977 19	Velež	1–1	Partizan	Mostar
			Trifunović 60'	Stadium: Stadion pod Bijelim Brijegom; Attendance: 11,000; Referee: Matovinović (Rijeka)

19 March 1977 20	Partizan	1–0	Zagreb	Belgrade
	Zavišić 37'			Stadium: Stadion JNA; Attendance: 25,000; Referee: Stanišić (Titograd)

27 March 1977 21	Partizan	0–0	Napredak Kruševac	Belgrade
				Stadium: Stadion JNA; Attendance: 20,000; Referee: Marković (Veliki Crljeni)

3 April 1977 22	OFK Beograd	2–2	Partizan	Belgrade
			Trifunović 49'; Kunovac 82'	Stadium: Omladinski Stadium; Attendance: 12,000; Referee: Madžoski (Prilep)

10 April 1977 23	Partizan	1–0	Olimpija	Belgrade
	Zavišić 73'			Stadium: Stadion JNA; Attendance: 10,000; Referee: Borovčić-Kurir (Split)

17 April 1977 24	Budućnost	2–0	Partizan	Titograd
				Stadium: Podgorica City Stadium; Attendance: 15,000; Referee: Glavina (Klis)

21 April 1977 25	Partizan	0–0	Radnički Niš	Belgrade
				Stadium: Stadion JNA

24 April 1977 26	Željezničar	1–1	Partizan	Sarajevo
			Grubješić 5'	Stadium: Stadion Grbavica; Attendance: 15,000; Referee: Tauzes (Ljubljana)

14 May 1977 27	Partizan	3–1	Čelik	Belgrade
	Antić 32'; Prekazi 40'; Zavišić 48'			Stadium: Stadion JNA; Attendance: 8,000; Referee: Rauš (Zagreb)

18 May 1977 28	Dinamo Zagreb	0–0	Partizan	Zagreb
				Stadium: Stadion Maksimir; Attendance: 15,000

22 May 1977 29	Partizan	2–1	Crvena zvezda	Belgrade
	Zavišić 55'; Prekazi 71'		Savić 77'	Stadium: Marakana*; Attendance: 69,740

28 May 1977 30	Sloboda Tuzla	3–0	Partizan	Tuzla
				Stadium: Stadion Tušanj; Attendance: 6,000; Referee: Ristić (Novi Sad)

5 June 1977 31	Partizan	1–1	Vojvodina	Belgrade
	Zavišić 15'			Stadium: Stadion JNA; Attendance: 10,000; Referee: Fresl (Zagreb)

8 June 1977 32	Hajduk Split	0–2	Partizan	Split
			Zavišić 35'; Prekazi 73'	Stadium: Stadion Stari plac Attendance: 20,000; Referee: Manojlovski (Tetovo)

11 June 1977 33	Partizan	1–1	Rijeka	Belgrade
	Prekazi 45'			Stadium: Stadion JNA; Attendance: 20,000; Referee: Maksimović (Novi Sad)

19 June 1977 34	Sarajevo	0–1	Partizan	Sarajevo
			Grubješić 28'	Stadium: Koševo City Stadium; Attendance: 15,000; Referee: Radić (Solin)

=== Yugoslav Cup ===
13 October 1976 Round of 32	Partizan	1–0	Željezničar	Belgrade
	Grubješić 34'			Stadium: Stadion JNA; Attendance: 10,000; Referee: Fresl (Samobor)

1 December 1976 Round of 16	Sarajevo	3–0	Partizan	Sarajevo
				Stadium: Koševo City Stadium; Attendance: 10,000; Referee: Manojlovski (Tetovo)

=== European Cup ===
==== First round ====
15 September 1976 First round 1st leg	Dynamo Kyiv (Soviet Union)	3–0	(Socialist Federal Republic of Yugoslavia) Partizan	Kyiv, Soviet Union
	Onyshchenko 7'; Troshkin 80'; Blokhin 88' (pen.)	Report		Stadium: Olympic Stadium; Attendance: 41,000; Referee: Bob Matthewson (England)

29 September 1976 First round 2nd leg	Partizan (Socialist Federal Republic of Yugoslavia)	0–2 (0 – 5 agg.)	(Soviet Union) Dynamo Kyiv	Belgrade, Yugoslavia
		Report	Muntyan 11' (pen.); Slobodyan 65'	Stadium: Marakana*; Attendance: 70,000; Referee: Robert Wurtz (France)

== Statistics ==
=== Goalscorers ===
This includes all competitive matches.

Rank	Pos	Nat	Name	Yugoslav First League	Yugoslav Cup	European Cup	Total
1	FW	(Socialist Federal Republic of Yugoslavia)	Pavle Grubješić	12	1	0	13
2	MF	(Socialist Federal Republic of Yugoslavia)	Ilija Zavišić	7	0	0	7
3	MF	(Socialist Federal Republic of Yugoslavia)	Dževad Prekazi	4	0	0	4
4	DF	(Socialist Federal Republic of Yugoslavia)	Rešad Kunovac	3	0	0	3
5	FW	(Socialist Federal Republic of Yugoslavia)	Sava Paunović	2	0	0	2
5	DF	(Socialist Federal Republic of Yugoslavia)	Miodrag Radović	2	0	0	2
5	MF	(Socialist Federal Republic of Yugoslavia)	Aleksandar Trifunović	2	0	0	2
8	FW	(Socialist Federal Republic of Yugoslavia)	Vukan Perović	1	0	0	1
8	FW	(Socialist Federal Republic of Yugoslavia)	Boško Đorđević	1	0	0	1
8	MF	(Socialist Federal Republic of Yugoslavia)	Nikica Klinčarski	1	0	0	1
8	DF	(Socialist Federal Republic of Yugoslavia)	Radomir Antić	1	0	0	1
own goals				1	0	0	1
TOTALS				37	1	0	38

=== Score overview ===
Win Draw Loss

Opposition	Home score	Away score	Aggregate
Crvena zvezda	2–1	0–1	2–2
Dinamo Zagreb	1–0	0–0	1–0
Sloboda Tuzla	1–1	0–3	1–4
Rijeka	1–1	1–1	2–2
Borac Banja Luka	0–0	0–2	0–2
Radnički Niš	0–0	0–2	0–2
Hajduk Split	1–0	2–0	3–0
Budućnost	1–0	0–2	1–2
Zagreb	1–0	0–2	1–2
Velež	2–0	1–1	3–1
Olimpija	1–0	2–4	3–4
Čelik	3–1	0–1	3–2
Vojvodina	1–1	1–2	2–3
OFK Beograd	3–2	2–2	5–4
Sarajevo	3–0	1–0	4–0
Napredak Kruševac	0–0	1–0	1–0
Željezničar	4–0	1–1	5–1

== See also ==
- List of FK Partizan seasons
