= Stenehed =

Archaeological site in Munkedal, Sweden

Coordinates: 58°34′38″N 11°31′0″E

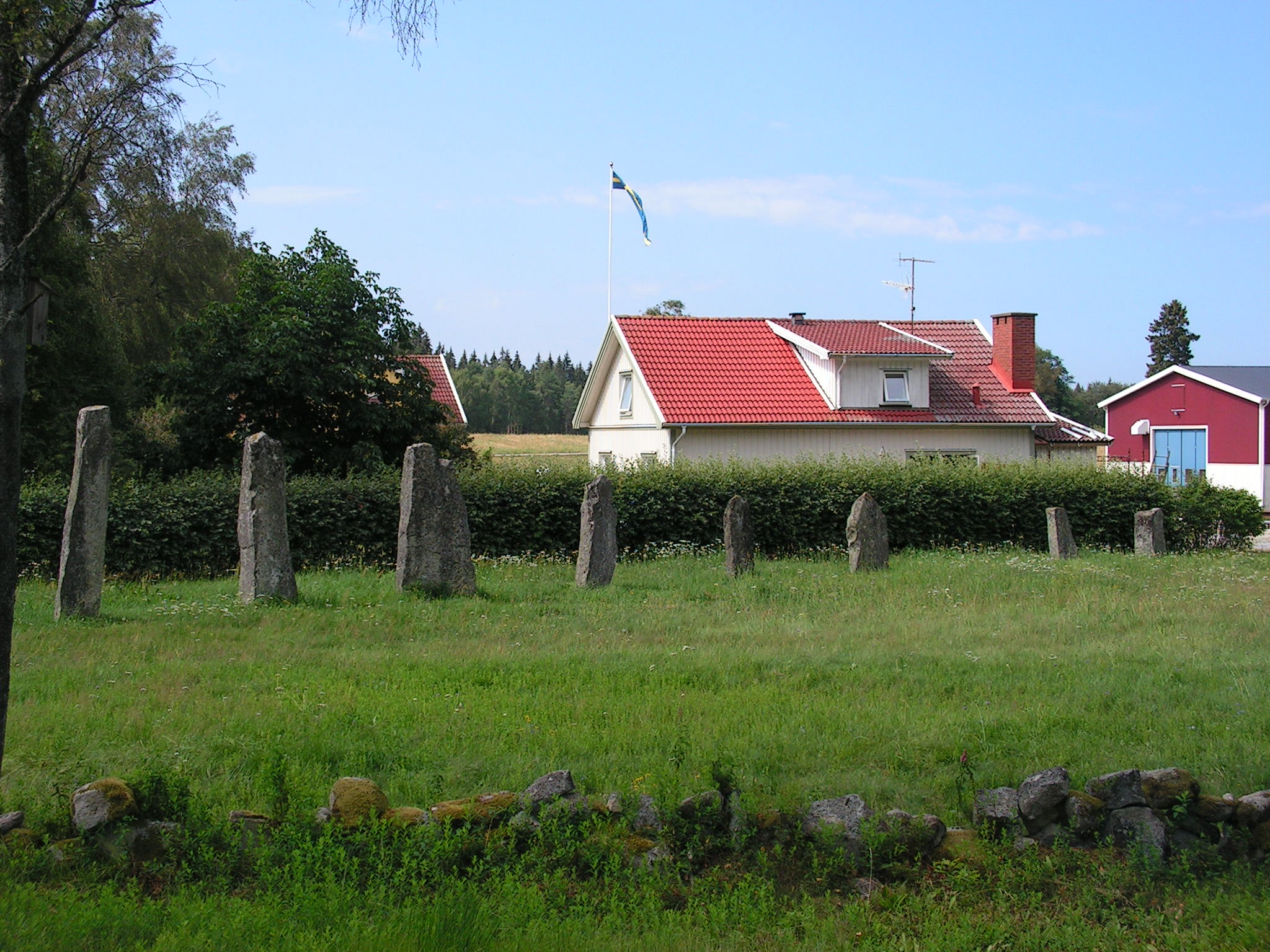
The menhirs at Stenehed.

Stenehed is an Iron Age grave field (Steneheds gravfält) located about 1 km southwest of Hällevadsholm, Munkedal Municipality, Västra Götaland County, Sweden. The area contains about 45 graves, a stone circle, a stone ship, and a row of menhirs.

Originally, there were eleven or twelve menhirs at the site; today, there are nine. The tallest one is 3.3 m; the shortest - 1.4 m. They are placed in a row, according to their heights. In 1980, Swedish astronomer Curt Roslund (1930-2013) suggested that they form an astronomical calendar, similar to Stonehenge in England.
