= Blagoja Kitanovski =

Macedonian footballer (born 1962)

Personal information
- Date of birth: 14 July 1962 (age 64)
- Place of birth: Bitola, FPR Yugoslavia
- Height: 1.80 m (5 ft 11 in)
- Position: Midfielder

Senior career*
Years	Team	Apps	(Gls)
1982–1986	Pelister	104	(24)
1986–1987	Radnički Niš	45	(12)
1987–1989	Sabadell	21	(4)
1990–1991	Vojvodina	12	(0)
1991–1992	Pelister	18	

Managerial career
- 1999: Macedonia U21
- 2000: Tikveš
- 2001: Osogovo
- 2001–2002: Pelister
- 2003: Tikveš
- 2004–2005: Sloga Jugomagnat
- 2006: Milano Kumanovo
- 2012: Tikveš
- * Club domestic league appearances and goals

Blagoja Kitanovski (Macedonian: Благоја Китановски, born 14 July 1962) is a football coach and former player from North Macedonia.

== Playing career ==
Born in Bitola, Kitanovski started playing at FK Pelister in the Yugoslav Second League, and had a football career that included playing in Yugoslav First League clubs FK Radnički Niš and FK Vojvodina beside a season in Spanish La Liga with CE Sabadell FC.

== Managerial career ==
After retiring, he became a coach. He coached the Macedonian under-21 national team in 1999. Afterwards he was the main coach of Pelister, Tikveš, Sloga and Milano.
