= 1967–68 Macedonian Republic League =

Macedonian Republic League
- Season: 1967–68

The 1967–68 Macedonian Republic League was the 24th since its establishment. Rabotnički Skopje won their 7th championship title.

== Participating teams ==
Club	City
Balkan	Skopje
Belasica	Strumica
Borec	Titov Veles
BSK	Bitola
Karaorman	Struga
KSK	Kumanovo
Ljuboten	Tetovo
Mavrovo	Gostivar
MIK Skopje	Skopje
Ohrid	Ohrid
Rabotnichki	Skopje
Teteks	Tetovo
Tikvesh	Kavadarci
Vardar	Negotino

== Final table ==
Pos	Team	Pld	W	D	L	GF	GA	GD	Pts
1	Rabotnichki (C)	26	16	6	4	73	28	+45	38
2	Tikvesh	26	14	3	9	49	36	+13	31
3	BSK	26	11	5	10	37	33	+4	27
4	Teteks	26	10	7	9	34	41	−7	27
5	Belasica	26	11	4	11	55	43	+12	26
6	Balkan	26	11	4	11	51	41	+10	26
7	MIK Skopje	26	10	6	10	50	42	+8	26
8	Ljuboten	26	10	5	11	39	41	−2	25
9	Mavrovo Gostivar	26	11	3	12	36	47	−11	25
10	Vardar Negotino	26	10	4	12	54	44	+10	24
11	Borec	26	11	2	13	40	51	−11	24
12	Ohrid	26	10	4	12	36	54	−18	24
13	KSK Kumanovo	26	8	5	13	39	78	−39	21
14	Karaorman	26	9	2	15	40	54	−14	20

(C) Champions
