= 1977–78 Macedonian Republic League =

Macedonian Republic League
- Season: 1977–78

The 1977–78 Macedonian Republic League was the 34th since its establishment. FK Tikvesh won their 2nd championship title.

== Participating teams ==
Club	City
11 Oktomvri	Prilep
Balkan	Skopje
Belasica	Strumica
Gostivar	Gostivar
Jugokokta	Skopje
Karaorman	Struga
Kozhuf	Gevgelija
Kumanovo	Kumanovo
Ohrid	Ohrid
Osogovo	Kochani
Pelister	Bitola
Pobeda	Valandovo
Skopje	Skopje
Sloga Skopje	Skopje
Sloga Vinica	Vinica
Tikvesh	Kavadarci
Transkop	Bitola
Vardar	Negotino

== Final table ==
Pos	Team	Pld	W	D	L	GF	GA	GD	Pts
1	Tikvesh (C)	34	20	8	6	69	35	+34	48
2	Pelister	34	17	9	8	52	23	+29	43
3	Kozhuf	34	12	13	9	40	35	+5	37
4	Pobeda Valandovo	34	14	8	12	37	29	+8	36
5	Vardar Negotino	34	13	10	11	38	34	+4	36
6	Osogovo	34	12	12	10	45	45	0	36
7	Jugokokta Gjorche Petrov	34	12	11	11	54	48	+6	35
8	Sloga Vinica	34	13	9	12	45	56	−11	35
9	Sloga Skopje	34	11	12	11	54	42	+12	34
10	Karaorman	34	13	8	13	39	39	0	34
11	Transkop Bitola	34	13	8	13	40	43	−3	34
12	Belasica	34	14	5	15	54	45	+9	33
13	11 Oktomvri	34	9	15	10	50	47	+3	33
14	Skopje	34	9	15	10	32	35	−3	33
15	Balkan	34	10	13	11	37	53	−16	33
16	Kumanovo	34	10	9	15	48	46	+2	29
17	Ohrid (R)	34	10	6	18	39	75	−36	26
18	Gostivar (R)	34	5	7	22	31	74	−43	17

(C) Champions; (R) Relegated
