= 1971–72 Macedonian Republic League =

Macedonian Republic League
- Season: 1971–72

The 1971–72 Macedonian Republic League was the 28th since its establishment. FK Tikveš Kavadarci won their 1st championship title.

== Participating teams ==
Club	City
11 Oktomvri	Prilep
Astibo	Shtip
Balkan	Skopje
Belasica	Strumica
Borec	Titov Veles
FCU Skopje	Skopje
Jugokokta	Skopje
Karaorman	Struga
Ljuboten	Tetovo
Mavrovo	Gostivar
Osogovo	Kochani
Ovche Pole	Sveti Nikole
Pelister	Bitola
Sloga	Skopje
Tikvesh	Kavadarci
ZIK Prilep	Prilep

== Final table ==
Pos	Team	Pld	W	D	L	GF	GA	GD	Pts
1	Tikvesh (C)	30	20	7	3	69	24	+45	47
2	Pelister	30	19	7	4	53	25	+28	45
3	Ovche Pole	30	16	10	4	53	21	+32	42
4	Balkan	30	13	5	12	50	42	+8	31
5	Ljuboten	30	13	5	12	46	46	0	31
6	Borec	30	11	8	11	34	33	+1	30
7	Karaorman	30	12	6	12	49	51	−2	30
8	Sloga Skopje	30	12	5	13	36	32	+4	29
9	FCU 55	30	13	3	14	44	46	−2	29
10	Belasica	30	11	6	13	30	23	+7	28
11	Jugokokta Gjorche Petrov	30	12	4	14	58	59	−1	28
12	Mavrovo Gostivar	30	11	5	14	45	49	−4	27
13	Osogovo	30	9	9	12	28	33	−5	27
14	11 Oktomvri	30	8	9	13	28	45	−17	25
15	ZIK Prilep (R)	30	9	5	16	23	45	−22	23
16	Astibo (R)	30	2	4	24	15	77	−62	8

(C) Champions; (R) Relegated
