= 1968–69 Yugoslav Second League =

Season of second division football in Yugoslavia

Yugoslav Second League
- Season: 1968–69
- Champions: Radnički Kragujevac (East Division); Budućnost Titograd (South Division); Sloboda Tuzla (North Division); Orijent Rijeka (West Division)
- Promoted: Radnički Kragujevac; Sloboda Tuzla
- Relegated: Mura; Istra Pula; Jedinstvo Bihać; Aluminij Kidričevo; Srem Sremska Mitrovica; Radnički Sombor; ZSK Zenica; Čelik Nikšić; Zmaj Makarska; Mladost Smederevska Palanka

The 1968–69 Yugoslav Second League season was the 23rd season of the Second Federal League (Serbo-Croatian: Druga savezna liga), the second level association football competition of SFR Yugoslavia, since its establishment in 1946.

The league was contested in four regional groups (East, South, North and West Division), with 16 clubs each. The top two teams from each group entered a promotion playoff. The two winners of the promotion playoff (Radnički Kragujevac and Sloboda Tuzla). There were from one to four teams relegated from each group at the end of the season, with ten teams relegated in total.

== East Division ==
=== Teams ===
A total of sixteen teams contested the division.

=== League table ===
Pos.	Team	Pts	Pld	W	D	L	GF	GA	GD
1.	Radnički Kragujevac	40	30	15	10	5	66	27	+39
2.	Trepça	38	30	17	4	9	51	36	+15
3.	Sloboda Užice	36	30	15	6	9	40	28	+12
4.	Prishtina	36	30	14	8	8	52	48	+4
5.	Rabotnički Skopje	32	30	14	4	12	40	38	+2
6.	Borac Čačak	31	30	10	11	9	32	27	+5
7.	Dubočica Leskovac	29	30	9	11	10	36	30	+6
8.	Napredak Kruševac	29	30	9	11	10	26	28	-2
9.	Bregalnica Štip	29	30	11	7	12	39	42	-3
10.	Sloga Kraljevo	28	30	10	8	12	36	38	-2
11.	Železničar Niš	27	30	11	5	14	35	42	-7
12.	Budućnost Peć	27	30	12	3	15	36	55	-15
13.	Pobeda Prilep	26	30	10	6	14	44	45	-1
14.	Tikveš Kavadarci	26	30	7	12	11	34	39	-5
15.	Ei Mladost Niš	25	30	10	5	15	32	47	-15
16.	Mladost Smederevska Palanka	21	30	7	7	16	19	48	-29

== South Division ==
=== Teams ===
A total of sixteen teams contested the division.

=== League table ===
Pos.	Team	Pts	Pld	W	D	L	GF	GA	GD
1.	Buducnost Titograd	45	30	18	9	3	48	15	+33
2.	Sutjeska Nikšić	44	30	19	6	5	67	23	+44
3.	Bosna Sarajevo	42	30	17	8	5	49	25	+24
4.	FK Lovćen	35	30	12	11	7	35	21	+14
5.	Pofalički Sarajevo	34	30	12	10	8	41	26	+15
6.	Famos Hrasnica	33	30	15	3	12	52	39	+13
7.	OFK Titograd	32	30	12	8	10	35	43	-8
8.	Borac Travnik	31	30	11	9	10	38	43	-5
9.	Jedinstvo Bijelo Polje	30	30	14	2	14	41	36	+5
10.	FK Leotar	29	30	11	8	11	32	30	+2
11.	GOŠK Dubrovnik	30	30	12	6	12	34	36	-2
12.	Rudar Kakanj	27	30	10	7	13	35	32	+3
13.	Borac Čapljina	27	30	8	11	11	35	44	-9
14.	ZSK Zenica	22	30	7	8	15	37	50	-13
15.	Čelik Nikšić	14	30	4	6	20	34	71	-37
16.	Zmaj Makarska	4	30	1	2	27	17	96	-79

== North Division ==
=== Teams ===
A total of sixteen teams contested the division.

=== League table ===
Pos.	Team	Pts	Pld	W	D	L	GF	GA	GD
1.	Sloboda Tuzla	50	30	22	6	2	68	21	+47
2.	FK Crvenka	45	30	21	3	6	68	37	+31
3.	NK Osijek	43	30	19	5	6	67	31	+36
4.	NK Borovo	36	30	14	8	8	41	34	+7
5.	Radnički Belgrade	33	30	12	9	9	44	32	+12
6.	Jedinstvo Brčko	32	30	11	10	9	34	36	-2
7.	Bačka Bačka Palanka	31	30	13	5	9	39	39	0
8.	Dinamo Pančevo	29	30	10	9	11	46	45	+1
9.	Spartak Subotica	29	30	13	3	14	48	50	-2
10.	BSK Slavonski Brod	29	30	10	9	11	41	43	-2
11	FK Novi Sad	23	30	9	5	16	41	57	-16
12.	NK Belišće	22	30	6	10	14	39	58	-19
13.	Dinamo Vinkovci	21	30	7	7	16	40	58	-18
14.	Voždovački	21	30	7	7	16	31	50	-19
15.	FK Srem	19	30	6	7	17	34	58	-24
16.	Radnički Sombor	16	30	5	6	9	39	71	-32

== West Division ==
=== Teams ===
A total of sixteen teams contested the division.

=== League table ===
Pos.	Team	Pts	Pld	W	D	L	GF	GA	GD
1.	Orijent Rijeka	49	30	23	3	4	79	27	+52
2.	Borac Banja Luka	44	30	18	8	4	93	24	+69
3.	Varteks Varaždin	37	30	14	9	7	57	33	+24
4.	Rudar Ljubija	37	30	16	5	9	54	34	+20
5.	Trešnjevka Zagreb	36	30	14	8	8	44	31	+13
6.	HNK Šibenik	34	30	11	12	7	52	42	+10
7.	RNK Split	31	30	12	7	11	50	47	+3
8.	Metalac Zagreb	31	30	13	5	12	48	54	-6
9.	Lokomotiva Zagreb	28	30	11	6	13	40	44	-4
10.	NK Zadar	28	30	9	10	11	40	49	-9
11.	NK Ljubljana	26	30	11	4	15	46	49	-3
12.	BSK Banja Luka	26	30	11	4	15	51	61	-10
13.	NK Mura	25	30	8	9	13	54	53	+1
14.	NK Istra	21	30	7	7	16	30	51	-21
15.	Jedinstvo Bihać	19	30	8	3	19	28	59	-31
16.	Aluminij Kidričevo	8	30	3	2	25	23	122	-99

== See also ==
- 1968–69 Yugoslav First League
- 1968–69 Yugoslav Cup
