= 1974–75 Macedonian Republic League =

Macedonian Republic League
- Season: 1974–75

The 1974–75 Macedonian Republic League was the 31st since its establishment. FK Pelister won their 3rd championship title.

== Participating teams ==
Club	City
11 Oktomvri	Prilep
Balkan	Skopje
Belasica	Strumica
Borec	Titov Veles
Bregalnica	Shtip
FAS 11 Oktomvri	Skopje
FCU Skopje	Skopje
Jugokokta	Skopje
Ljuboten	Tetovo
Ohrid	Ohrid
Osogovo	Kochani
Ovche Pole	Sveti Nikole
Pelister	Bitola
Rudar	Probishtip
Skopje	Skopje
Tikvesh	Kavadarci
Tiverija	Strumica
Vardar	Negotino

== Final table ==
Pos	Team	Pld	W	D	L	GF	GA	GD	Pts
1	Pelister (C)	34	25	6	3	70	24	+46	56
2	Tikvesh	34	17	10	7	50	32	+18	44
3	FCU 55	34	16	6	12	54	35	+19	38
4	Bregalnica Shtip	34	13	12	9	62	44	+18	38
5	Rudar Probishtip	34	12	12	10	49	44	+5	36
6	11 Oktomvri	34	10	15	9	46	40	+6	35
7	Ohrid	34	12	10	12	51	50	+1	34
8	Osogovo	34	9	16	9	36	38	−2	34
9	FAS 11 Oktomvri Skopje	34	9	15	10	40	45	−5	33
10	Skopje	34	12	8	14	46	59	−13	32
11	Tiverija	34	12	7	15	36	48	−12	31
12	Balkan	34	11	8	15	37	38	−1	30
13	Jugokokta Gjorche Petrov	34	11	8	15	54	57	−3	30
14	Ovche Pole	34	10	10	14	47	54	−7	30
15	Belasica	34	9	12	13	39	64	−25	30
16	Vardar Negotino	34	10	9	15	42	45	−3	29
17	Ljuboten (R)	34	11	7	16	45	69	−24	29
18	Borec (R)	34	6	11	17	33	54	−21	23

(C) Champions; (R) Relegated
