= 1973–74 Macedonian Republic League =

Macedonian Republic League
- Season: 1973–74

The 1973–74 Macedonian Republic League was the 30th since its establishment. FK Teteks won their 3rd championship title.

== Participating teams ==
Club	City
11 Oktomvri	Prilep
Balkan	Skopje
Belasica	Strumica
Borec	Titov Veles
Bregalnica	Shtip
FCU Skopje	Skopje
Jugokokta	Skopje
Ljuboten	Tetovo
Ohrid	Ohrid
Osogovo	Kochani
Rudar	Probishtip
Silika	Gostivar
Skopje	Skopje
Sloga	Skopje
Teteks	Tetovo
Tikvesh	Kavadarci
Tiverija	Strumica
Vardar	Negotino

== Final table ==
Pos	Team	Pld	W	D	L	GF	GA	GD	Pts
1	Teteks (C)	34	19	10	5	64	29	+35	48
2	Bregalnica Shtip	34	20	7	7	74	38	+36	47
3	Tikvesh	34	16	6	12	53	39	+14	38
4	Balkan	34	16	6	12	60	48	+12	38
5	Belasica	34	16	4	14	49	47	+2	36
6	Osogovo	34	16	4	14	28	35	−7	36
7	Rudar Probishtip	34	12	10	12	47	41	+6	34
8	Jugokokta Gjorche Petrov	34	14	6	14	61	59	+2	34
9	11 Oktomvri	34	13	8	13	41	43	−2	34
10	FCU 55	34	12	8	14	50	50	0	32
11	Tiverija	34	13	6	15	37	53	−16	32
12	Ljuboten	34	12	7	15	42	52	−10	31
13	Vardar Negotino	34	12	7	15	34	45	−11	31
14	Borec	34	12	6	16	38	59	−21	30
15	Ohrid	34	11	7	16	49	49	0	29
16	Skopje	34	9	11	14	29	43	−14	29
17	Silika Gostivar (R)	34	11	5	18	37	46	−9	27
18	Sloga Skopje (R)	34	8	10	16	35	52	−17	26

(C) Champions; (R) Relegated
