= FK Radnički 1923 =

Radnički 1923
- Full name: Fudbalski Klub Radnički 1923
- Founded: 1923; 103 years ago
- Ground: Čika Dača Stadium
- Capacity: 15,100
- President: Branko Antić
- Head coach: Feđa Dudić
- League: Serbian SuperLiga
- 2025–26: Serbian SuperLiga, 12th of 16
- Website: fkradnicki.com
Home colours	Away colours

Fudbalski klub Radnički 1923 (Serbian Cyrillic: Фудбалски клуб Рaднички 1923), historically known as Radnički Kragujevac (Serbian Cyrillic: Рaднички Крагујевац), is a professional football club from Kragujevac, Serbia making up the major part of the Radnički Kragujevac Sports Society. It competes in the Serbian SuperLiga, top tier of national football league system.

The name Radnički means Labourers' Football Club in Serbian and its roots come from the relation the club had with labour movements during the first half of the 20th century. It is the most popular and successful club from Kragujevac and second oldest in the city after city rivals FK Šumadija, founded in 1903.

Renowned for enthusiastic support from its fans Crveni Đavoli, club showed rather modest results historically, playing just five seasons in Yugoslavia's top flight in 1970s, cementing its place as one of leading Serbian SuperLiga sides only in early 2020s and reaching European competitions for the first time in 2024.

== History ==
=== Early years ===
The club was formed in 1923 during an assembly in a restaurant in Kragujevac under the name Mladi Radnik (Young Labourer). Aleksandar Ratković was its first president. The first match that Mladi Radnik played was a 2–0 away loss to local side SK Triglav. On 16 August 1925, they played host to SK Radnički Beograd in a match where the visitors eventually won 5–0. One week later, Mladi Radnik won their first match against Radnički Niš 7–1.

In 1929, Mladi Radnik changed its name to Radnički, an adjective invoking labour and workers in Serbian, as its roots come from the relation the club had with labour movements during the first half of the 20th century.

The club's stature and significance began increasing from 1933. It got its own stadium in 1935, and the first match at the new stadium was played on 18 August 1935, against local rivals Slavija, which was won by 1–0 and the first goal scored Jeremija Nikolić. At that time the club had also a number of international matches. Radnički was in the prewar years of the World War II host of teams like Olympique Marseille, Ferencváros and Honvéd Budapest, Rapid Wien and some others. The club competed in the highest league of the Kragujevac Football Subassociation which gave access to the qualifiers for the Yugoslav Championship. Radnički won the Subassociation league in 1934, 1935, 1938 and 1939, however it only managed to qualify once to the national league, in the 1935–36 season. They had a fierce rivalry with FK Šumadija 1903 in this period.

=== Tragic days (1941–1944) ===
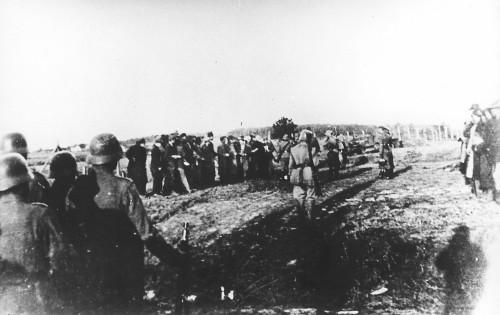
Nazi Germans rounding up Serbian civilians in Kragujevac for execution.

During World War II, the Kingdom of Yugoslavia was invaded and partitioned by the Axis powers, and Kragujevac were occupied by Nazi Germany and underwent a number of tragic days during the war. The local population was suppressed and many Serbian civilians, as well as Roma and Jews, were murdered or have perished in concentration camps. Radnički lost during the war numerous players, club officials and a whole generation of club supporters. Therefore, comes mainly the especially deep-rooted antifascist attitude of the city, the club and its supporters. To commemorate the victims of the massacre, the whole village of Šumarice, where the killings took place, was turned into a memorial park, called Šumarice Memorial Park. The Museum of Genocide in Kragujevac is located not so far from Radnički's stadium. After the liberation of Kragujevac in 1944, the club continued to develop.

=== 1946–1970 ===
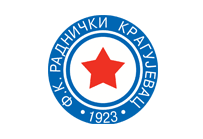
Radnički's 2nd crest.

In 1946, Radnički played against Red Star Belgrade for membership of the newly created Yugoslav First League. There were so many fans that the City Stadium was too small to accommodate all visitors. Then, the city and the club decided to build a new stadium. After eight years of construction, the new stadium was ready to be opened. The official opening took place on 6 June, in 1957, against Partizan Belgrade and ended with 2–2. In 1969, Radnički was promoted for the first time to the Yugoslav First League after beating Sutjeska Nikšić and FK Crvenka in the play-offs. During the season, Radnički had a great 4–1 victory over Partizan Belgrade at JNA Stadium. On this 7 September, in 1969, the Radnički fans showed almost fanatic support for their team. The atmosphere was so remarkable that domestic and foreign news outlets and reporters compared it to the atmosphere at Old Trafford stadium of Manchester United. Radnički fans and the club were given the nickname Crveni Đavoli (English: Red Devils), after the nickname for Manchester United. Brazilian football giant FC Santos with the legendary Pelé, impressed by the atmosphere, decided to travel to Kragujevac and face Radnički during their European tour instead of staying in Belgrade and playing a friendly game against Partizan. They were not disappointed. More than 40,000 spectators were at the Čika Dača Stadium on September 15th 1969 with a further seven to eight thousand enthusiastic fans standing outside the stadium. Radnički achieved in a 4–4 draw in a legendary atmosphere. At the end of the 1969/1970 saeson of the domestic championship, Radnički was 15th in their first top league season and the survival was ensured on the last round with a victory over Vojvodina by 1–0.

=== 1971–1976 ===
The 1971, Radnički finished the season as 17th and narrowly avoided the relegation. The following 1971/72 season, the club returned to the Yugoslav Second League. However, the return to the first league is not a long time coming. Radnički managed to get back among the best teams of the former Yugoslavia and to play two more seasons in the top division, before they went at the end of the 1975/76 season the way to the second division. Then comes the drought period of the club for two decades.

=== 1998–present ===
Since the relegation in 1976, the club was no longer member of the top division. The civil war during the 90s (1992–1995), the inflation and the UN sanctions have hit the state and his population hard. The club relegated even several times in the third league, but the final return in the first league occurred in 1998. It followed the longest period in the first division, in total for four seasons, before they went at the end of the 2001/02 season again the way to the second division. In 2010, FK Šumadija Radnički 1923 was a short lived name of the club during the 2009/10 season after the fusion with FK Šumadija 1903. The old name Radnički was returned and changed to Radnički Kragujevac. However, 2010 marked a turning point for the club, which achieved the promotion, and returning to the top flight, the Serbian SuperLiga, in 2011, where it remained until nowadays, safe for occasional relegations and promotions.

== Club colours and crest ==
The name of the town Kragujevac derived from the Serbian word "kraguj", which is a name used for a native species of hawk from the genus Accipiter, which in the Middle Ages often nested in the city and its surrounding region, and was appreciated by the population as they were used occasionally for hunting. Thus the name means "City of the Kraguj". Today, the Kraguj occupies a place of honor on the city's coat of arms and also on the crest of the club. The typical colours of Radnički are mainly red, but the club used also as away kit, an all-turquoise jersey.

== Stadium ==
The home field of Radnički Kragujevac is the Čika Dača Stadium. It is named in memory of Danilo Stojanović, known as Čika Dača, who is considered to be a pioneer of football in Serbia. The construction of the stadium was finished on 6 June, in 1957, and had a capacity for up to 40,000 spectators. After renovations in 2007, the stadium new capacity is 15,100 seats.

=== Further development ===
For the stadium are planned several phases of reconstructions. The first phase includes the installation of 1,400 lux strong floodlights of the brand Philips and new locker and club rooms, while for the next phase planned the full reconstruction of the west stand (inclusive covering), the press and the VIP lounge. Then will follow the construction of the east stand, so that it fulfills the UEFA standards for European matches. The first phase started in July 2012.

== Supporters ==
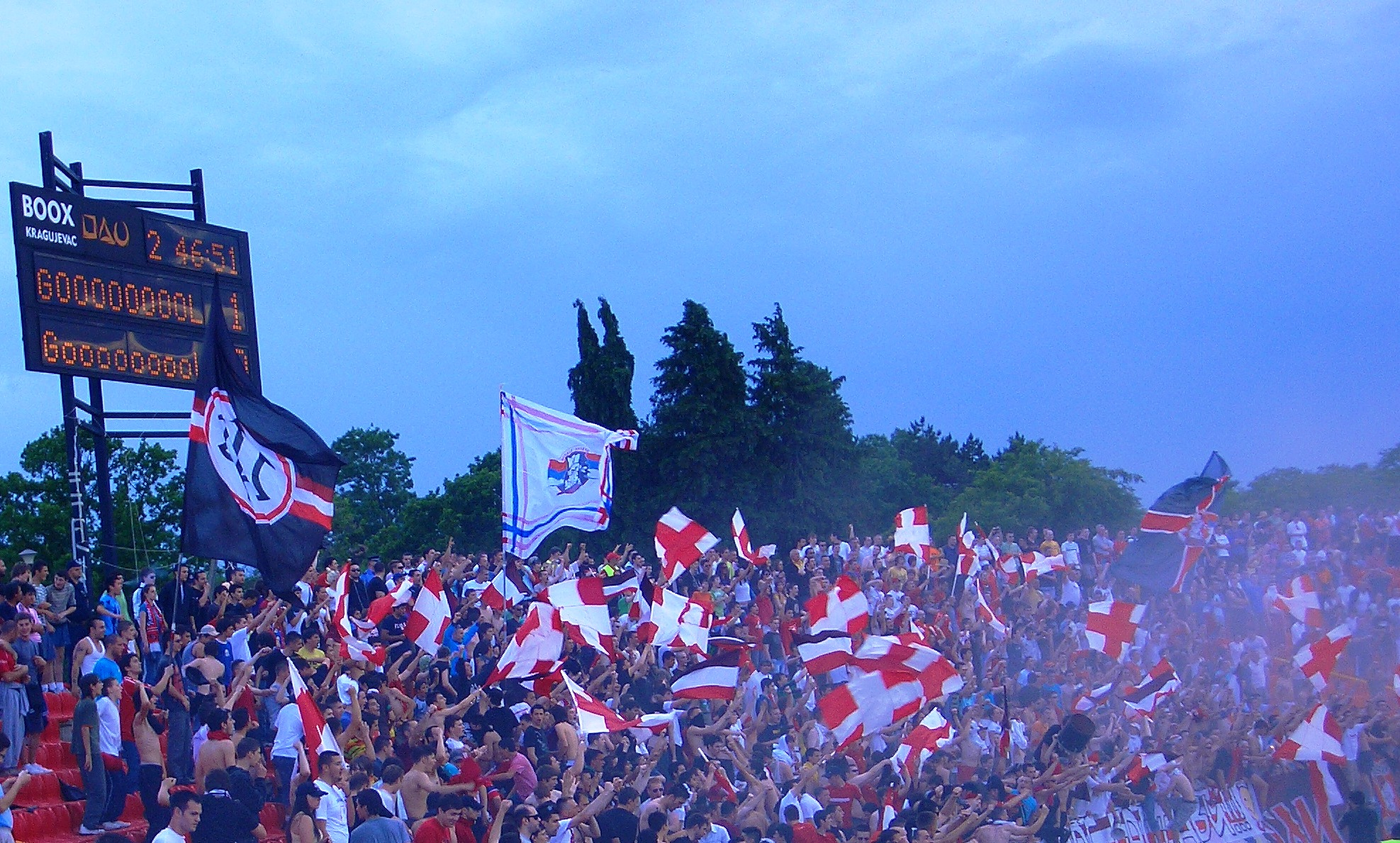
The Đavoli at the Čika Dača Stadium in 2011.

Since its foundation, Radnički always had considerable number of supporters. The first organized support of Radnički fans was recorded on 29 July, in 1934. About 600 Radnički fans drove to Belgrade for a match against BASK. The real spectator boom began in the late sixties, were Radnički was promoted for the first time to the top level. At that time began the first approaches of modern organized support. The away match against Partizan should make history. On this 7 September, in 1969, the Radnički fans support their team particularly fanatical and the atmosphere was so fantastic that it was compared with the atmosphere at Old Trafford stadium in Manchester (statements from local and foreign journalists and opponents). On this day, the Radnički fans and the club were given the nickname Crveni Đavoli (English: The Red Devils), after the nickname for Manchester United. However, the first organized meeting of the Crveni Djavoli was on 9 March, in 1989. Together, the fans went to a basketball game and the Djavoli took advantage of this day as the day of its official founding. Today, they are always on the southside of the Čika Dača Stadium, from where they fiery support their club. Besides football, they also support other sport sections of the Radnički Kragujevac Sport Association.

== Club honours and achievements ==
=== Yugoslavia ===
- Yugoslav Second League
  - Winners: 1968–69, 1973–74
- Kragujevac Football Subassociation
  - Winners: 1935, 1936, 1938, 1939

=== Serbia ===
- Serbian First League
  - Winners: 2020–21
  - Runners-up: 2010–11
- Serbian League West
  - Winners: 2016–17

=== Individual awards ===
Serbian SuperLiga top scorer

Season	Name	Goals
2011–12	Darko Spalević	19

== European record ==
Season	Competition	Round	Opponent	Home	Away	Aggregate
2024–25	UEFA Conference League	Second qualifying round	(Montenegro) Mornar Bar	1–0	1–2 (a.e.t.)	2–2 (3–4 p)
2025–26	UEFA Conference League	Second qualifying round	(Faroe Islands) KÍ	0–0	0–1	0–1

== Players ==
=== Current squad ===
As of 31 August 2026

Note: Flags indicate national team as defined under FIFA eligibility rules; some limited exceptions apply. Players may hold more than one non-FIFA nationality.

No.	Pos.	Nation	Player
1	GK	BIH	Muhamed Šahinović (on loan from Raków Częstochowa)
2	DF	BEL	Mohamed Mezghrani
3	DF	SRB	Nemanja Miletić
4	DF	SRB	Nikola Miličić
5	DF	SRB	Nikola Marjanović
6	DF	ISR	Hasan Hilu
7	DF	MNE	Bojica Nikčević
8	DF	BIH	Mićo Kuzmanović
9	FW	SRB	Uroš Sremčević (on loan from Red Star Belgrade)
10	FW	FRA	Mohamed Cissé
11	FW	SRB	Ilija Babić
14	DF	SRB	Slobodan Simović (captain)
16	MF	SRB	Vanja Tomić
19	MF	CZE	David Buchta
24	DF	SRB	Dimitrije Nikolić

No.	Pos.	Nation	Player
25	DF	NGR	Thomas Ude
26	FW	MNE	Aleksa Marušić
27	MF	SRB	Miloš Ristić
28	MF	SRB	Semir Alić
29	FW	POR	António Gomes
33	DF	SRB	Mateja Dukić
35	MF	SRB	Nemanja Glavčić
40	FW	SRB	Srđan Borovina
41	MF	SRB	Aleksa Jelić
70	FW	AUT	Jovan Živković (on loan from Győr)
77	FW	LUX	Issa Bah
80	MF	BIH	Jovan Ilić
81	GK	SRB	Luka Lijeskić
93	GK	SRB	Strahinja Aleksić
99	FW	BIH	Asmir Suljić

=== Players with multiple nationalities ===
- (Serbia) (Hungary) Slobodan Simović
- (Serbia) (Bosnia and Herzegovina) Ilija Babić
- (Bosnia and Herzegovina) (Serbia) Jovan Ilić
- (Bosnia and Herzegovina) (Hungary) Asmir Suljić
- (Montenegro) (Serbia) Bojica Nikčević
- (Austria) (Serbia) Jovan Živković
- (Luxembourg) (Portugal) (Guinea) Issa Bah
- (Portugal) (Luxembourg) António Gomes
- (France) (Senegal) Mohamed Cissé
- (Belgium) (Algeria) Mohamed Mezghrani

=== Out on loan ===
Note: Flags indicate national team as defined under FIFA eligibility rules; some limited exceptions apply. Players may hold more than one non-FIFA nationality.

No.	Pos.	Nation	Player
—	GK	SRB	Miloš Mladenović (at GFK Dubočica 1923 until the end of the 2026–27 season)
—	DF	SRB	Stefan Petkoski Cimbaljević (at Smederevo 1924 until the end of the 2026–27 season)
—	DF	SRB	Viktor Živadinović (at Borac 1926 until the end of the 2026–27 season)

No.	Pos.	Nation	Player
—	DF	SRB	Petar Milutinović (at Borac 1926 until the end of the 2026–27 season)
—	MF	SRB	Luka Milojević (at Metalac until the end of the 2026–27 season)
—	MF	NGR	Ibrahim Yusuf (at Borac 1926 until the end of the 2026–27 season)

=== Notable players ===
To appear in this section a player must have either:

- Played at least 80 games for the club.
- Set a club record or won an individual award while at the club.
- Played at least one international match for their national team at any time.
- (Socialist Federal Republic of Yugoslavia) Vinko Begović
- (Socialist Federal Republic of Yugoslavia) Predrag Đorđević
- (Socialist Federal Republic of Yugoslavia) Srboljub Krivokuća
- (Socialist Federal Republic of Yugoslavia) Žarko Olarević
- (Socialist Federal Republic of Yugoslavia) Predrag Spasić
- (Socialist Federal Republic of Yugoslavia) Sava Paunović
- (Socialist Federal Republic of Yugoslavia) Aleksandar Stojanović
- (Federal Republic of Yugoslavia) Goran Drulić
- (Federal Republic of Yugoslavia) (Serbia) Ognjen Koroman
- (Federal Republic of Yugoslavia) Ivica Kralj
- (Federal Republic of Yugoslavia) Radovan Krivokapić
- (Federal Republic of Yugoslavia) Nenad Lalatović
- (Federal Republic of Yugoslavia) (Serbia) Bojan Mališić
- (Federal Republic of Yugoslavia) (Serbia) Stanimir Milošković
- (Federal Republic of Yugoslavia) Radovan Radaković
- (Federal Republic of Yugoslavia) (Serbia) Zoran Radosavljević
- (Federal Republic of Yugoslavia) (Serbia) Đorđe Rakić
- (Federal Republic of Yugoslavia) Saša Stevanović
- (Serbia) Filip Kostić
- (Serbia) Luka Milivojević
- (Serbia) Darko Spalević
- (Serbia) Nemanja Tomić
- (Armenia) Ognjen Čančarević
- (Bosnia and Herzegovina) Aleksandar Kosorić
- (Canada) Momčilo Stojanović
- (Kazakhstan) Nenad Erić
- (North Macedonia) Dragan Čadikovski
- (North Macedonia) Toni Jakimovski
- (Montenegro) Miloš Brnović
- (Montenegro) Marko Simić
- (Nigeria) Izuchukwu Anthony
- (North Korea) An Il-bom
- (North Korea) Myong Cha-hyon
- (North Korea) Ri Kwang-il
- (Tunisia) Wajdi Sahli

For the list of current and former players with Wikipedia article, please see: Category:FK Radnički Kragujevac players.

== Club officials ==
As of 14 April 2026

Current officials
- General director: (Serbia) Igor Konatar
- Sporting director: (Bosnia and Herzegovina) Feđa Dudić
- Head coach: (Bosnia and Herzegovina) Feđa Dudić
- Assistant coach: (Bosnia and Herzegovina) Adnan Jahić
- Assistant coach : (Serbia) Miroslav Stakić
- Analyst: (Serbia) Lazar Savić
- Goalkeeping coach: (Serbia) Stefan Radulović
- Fitness coach: (Bosnia and Herzegovina) Jasmin Trnovac
- Economic: (Serbia) Marko Trifunović
- General secretary: (Serbia) Marko Dimitrijević
- Team manager: (Serbia) Zorana Punoševac
- Doctor of the first team: (Serbia) Nenad Jovanović
- Physiotherapist: (Serbia) Ilija Milenković
- Physiotherapist: (Serbia) Stevan Janićijević
- Physiotherapist: (Serbia) Đorđe Milanović

== Historical list of coaches ==
- (Socialist Federal Republic of Yugoslavia) Florijan Matekalo
- (Socialist Federal Republic of Yugoslavia) Bela Palfi
- (Socialist Federal Republic of Yugoslavia) Boris Marović (1968–1969)
- (Socialist Federal Republic of Yugoslavia) Dušan Nenković (1969–1971)
- (Socialist Federal Republic of Yugoslavia) Aleksandar Vukotić (1971–1972)
- (Socialist Federal Republic of Yugoslavia) Zoran Ristić (1974–1976)
- (Socialist Federal Republic of Yugoslavia) Dušan Nenković (1986–1987)
- (Federal Republic of Yugoslavia) Sava Paunović (1995)
- (Federal Republic of Yugoslavia) Stanislav Karasi (1996)
- (Federal Republic of Yugoslavia) Sava Paunović (1997–1998)
- (Federal Republic of Yugoslavia) Žarko Olarević (1998)
- (Federal Republic of Yugoslavia) Slobodan Stašević (1998–1999)
- (Federal Republic of Yugoslavia) Sava Paunović (1999–2000)
- (Federal Republic of Yugoslavia) Miroslav Jovanović (2000–2001)
- (Serbia and Montenegro) Radmilo Jovanović (2001)
- (Serbia and Montenegro) Milenko Radivojević (2002)
- (Serbia and Montenegro) Nebojša Vučićević (2003)
- (Serbia and Montenegro) Bogdan Korak (2004–2005)
- (Serbia) Slobodan Stašević (2006–2007)
- (Serbia) Milan Samardžić (2007–2008)
- (Bosnia and Herzegovina) Bahrija Hadžić (2008)
- (Serbia) Slavko Vojičić (2008–2009)
- (Serbia) Slobodan Stašević (2009)
- (Serbia) Slobodan Dogandžić (2009)
- (Bosnia and Herzegovina) Vlado Čapljić (2010–2011)
- (Serbia) Slavenko Kuzeljević (Jul 2011 – Oct 2012)
- (Serbia) Dejan Đurđević (Oct 2012 – Apr 2013)
- (Serbia) Dragoljub Bekvalac (Apr 2013 – Jun 2013)
- (Serbia) Radmilo Ivančević (Jun 2013 – Mar 2014)
- (Serbia) Predrag Ristanović (Mar 2014 – Apr 2014)
- (Serbia) Dragoljub Bekvalac (Apr 2014 – Oct 2014)
- (Bosnia and Herzegovina) Vlado Čapljić (Oct 2014)
- (Serbia) Neško Milovanović (Oct 2014 – Sep 2015)
- (Serbia) Radovan Radaković (Sep 2015 – 16 Dec 2016)
- (Bosnia and Herzegovina) Vlado Čapljić (26 Dec 2016 – Apr 2017)
- (Serbia) Slaviša Kovačević (18 Apr 2017 – Jun 2017)
- (Serbia) Slavko Vojičić (2017–2018)
- (Serbia) Darko Tešović (28 Jun 2018 – Oct 2018)
- (Serbia) Darko Milisavljević (interim) (Oct 2018 – Nov 2018)
- (Serbia) Dejan Nikolić (Nov 2018 – Sep 2019)
- (Bosnia and Herzegovina) Darko Vojvodić (6 Sep 2019 – Nov 2019)
- (Serbia) Darko Milisavljević (Nov 2019 – Jul 2020)
- (Serbia) Aleksandar Linta (Jul 2020 – Apr 2021)
- (Serbia) Dejan Joksimović (Apr 2021 – Jun 2021)
- (Serbia) Vladimir Radenković (10 Jun 2021 – Nov 2021)
- (Serbia) Zoran Milinković (15 Nov 2021 – Feb 2022)
- (Serbia) Nenad Lalatović (5 Feb 2022 – Jun 2022)
- (Serbia) Dejan Joksimović (Jun 2022 – Sep 2023)
- (Bosnia and Herzegovina) Feđa Dudić (25 Sep 2023 – Aug 2025)
- (Serbia) Aleksandar Luković (6 Aug 2025 – Oct 2025)
- (Bosnia and Herzegovina) Mladen Žižović (23 Oct 2025 – Nov 2025)
- (Bosnia and Herzegovina) Bojan Puzigaća (Nov 2025 – Dec 2025)
- (Montenegro) Božidar Bandović (Jan 2026 – Apr 2026)
- (Serbia) Slavko Matić (Apr 2026 – May 2026)
- (Bosnia and Herzegovina) Feđa Dudić (12 Jun 2026 –)

== Kit manufacturers and shirt sponsors ==
Period	Kit Manufacturer	Shirt Sponsor
1996–1999	Reusch	None
1999–2003	NAAI	None
2008–2009	Nike	None
2009–2010	Jako	None
2010–2013	Joma	None
2013–2017	Jako	None
2017–2020	NAAI	None
2020–present	Jako	Mozzart
