= Hällevadsholm =

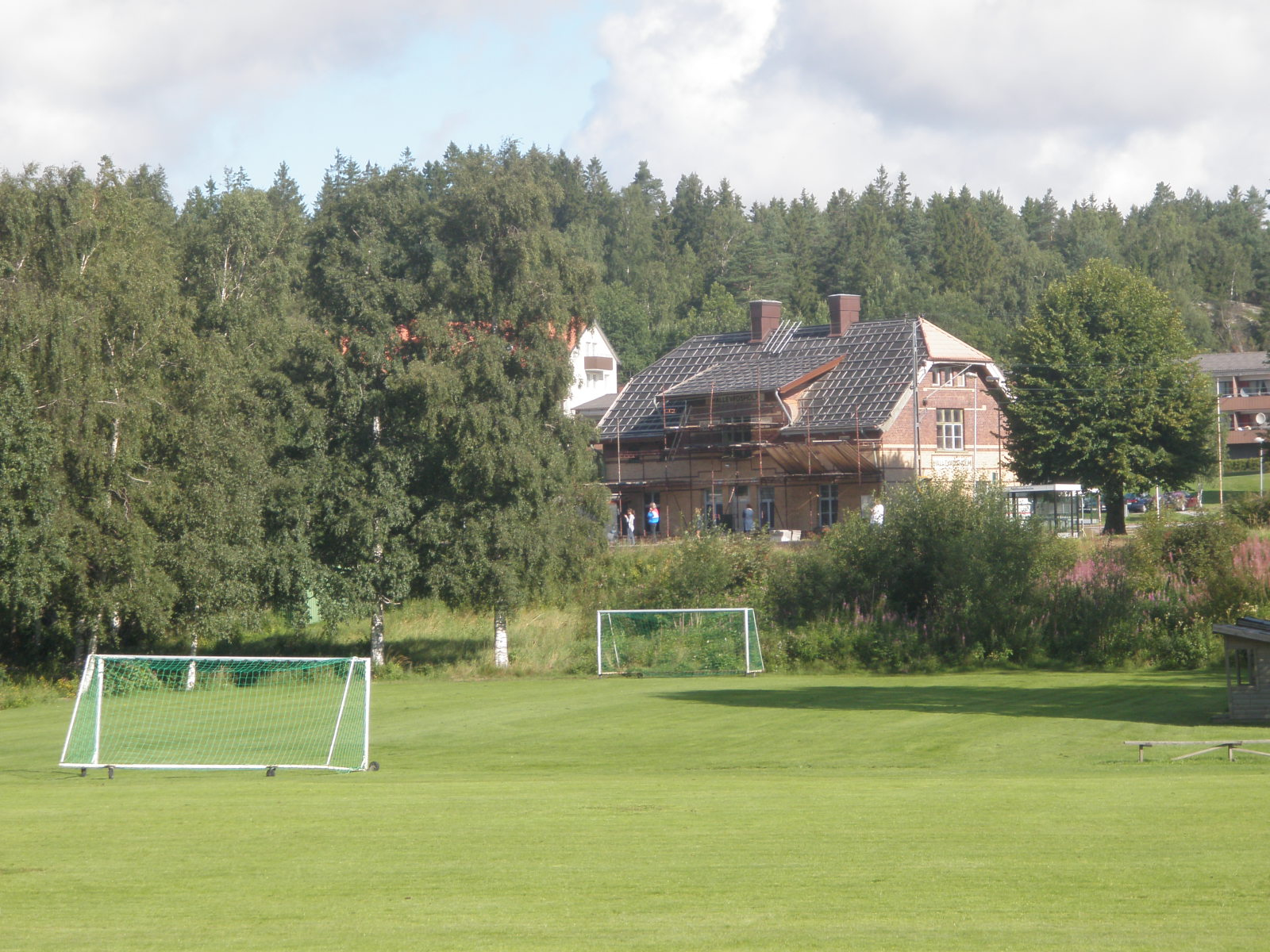

- Location within Västra Götaland Location within Sweden
- Coordinates: 58°35′N 11°32′E
- Country: Sweden
- Province: Bohuslän
- County: Västra Götaland County
- Municipality: Munkedal Municipality

Area
  - Total: 0.91 km^{2} (0.35 sq mi)

Population (31 December 2010)
  - Total: 772
  - Density: 848/km^{2} (2,200/sq mi)
- Time zone: UTC+1 (CET)
  - Summer (DST): UTC+2 (CEST)
- Climate: Cfb

Hällevadsholm is a locality situated in Munkedal Municipality, Västra Götaland County, Sweden with 772 inhabitants in 2010. An Iron Age grave field, Stenehed, is located nearby.
