= 1999–2000 Macedonian First Football League =

Football tournament edition

Macedonian First League
- Season: 1999–2000
- Dates: 15 August 1999 – 28 May 2000
- Champions: Sloga Jugomagnat; 2nd domestic title
- Relegated: Napredok; Kumanovo
- Champions League: Sloga Jugomagnat
- UEFA Cup: Pobeda; Rabotnichki
- Intertoto Cup: Pelister
- Matches: 182
- Goals: 524 (2.88 per match)
- Top goalscorer: Argjend Beqiri (19 goals)
- Biggest home win: Napredok 10–0 Kumanovo (21 November 1999)
- Biggest away win: Napredok 0–8 Pobeda (19 September 1999); Kumanovo 0–8 Vardar (26 September 1999)
- Highest scoring: Napredok 10–0 Kumanovo (21 November 1999)

The 1999–2000 Macedonian First League was the 8th season of the Macedonian First Football League, the highest football league of Macedonia. The first matches of the season were played on 15 August 1999 and the last on 28 May 2000. Sloga Jugomagnat defended their championship title, having won their second title in a row.

== Promotion and relegation ==
At the start of the 1999–2000 season

Promoted from 1998–99 Second League

- Napredok (Winners; West)
- Kumanovo (Winners; East)

Relegated to 2000–01 Second League

- Skopje (13th)
- Balkan BISI (14th)

At the end of the 1999–2000 season

Promoted from 1999–2000 Second League

- Shkëndija HB (Winners; West)
- Belasica (Winners; East)

Relegated to 2000–01 Second League

- Napredok (13th)
- Kumanovo (14th)

== Participating teams ==
Location of teams in 1999–2000 Macedonian First League

Club	City	Stadium
Borec MHK	Veles	Gradski stadion Veles
Cementarnica 55	Skopje	Stadion Cementarnica
Kumanovo	Kumanovo	Gradski stadion Kumanovo
Makedonija Asiba	Skopje	Stadion Gjorche Petrov
Napredok	Kichevo	Gradski stadion Kichevo
Osogovo	Kochani	Stadion Nikola Mantov
Pelister	Bitola	Stadion Tumbe Kafe
Pobeda	Prilep	Stadion Goce Delchev
Rabotnichki Kometal	Skopje	Gradski stadion Skopje
Sasa	Makedonska Kamenica	Gradski stadion Makedonska Kamenica
Sileks	Kratovo	Gradski stadion Kratovo
Sloga Jugomagnat	Skopje	Chair Stadium
Tikvesh	Kavadarci	Gradski stadion Kavadarci
Vardar	Skopje	Gradski stadion Skopje

== League table ==
Pos	Team	Pld	W	D	L	GF	GA	GD	Pts	Qualification or relegation
1	Sloga Jugomagnat (C)	26	18	7	1	55	13	+42	61	Qualification for the Champions League first qualifying round
2	Pobeda	26	15	7	4	57	23	+34	52	Qualification for the UEFA Cup qualifying round
3	Rabotnichki Kometal	26	16	2	8	41	26	+15	50	Qualification for the UEFA Cup qualifying round
4	Pelister	26	14	5	7	48	30	+18	47	Qualification for the Intertoto Cup first round
5	Cementarnica 55	26	14	5	7	43	29	+14	47	
6	Sileks	26	11	7	8	43	29	+14	40	
7	Makedonija	26	10	6	10	29	28	+1	36	
8	Tikvesh	26	9	4	13	37	54	−17	31	
9	Borec	26	8	6	12	30	42	−12	30	
10	Vardar	26	7	8	11	39	38	+1	29	
11	Sasa	26	7	7	12	22	34	−12	28	
12	Osogovo	26	7	5	14	34	53	−19	26	
13	Napredok (R)	26	4	8	14	30	48	−18	20	Relegation to the Macedonian Second League
14	Kumanovo (R)	26	2	3	21	16	77	−61	9	Relegation to the Macedonian Second League

Source: MacedonianFootball.com, RSSSF.org
Rules for classification: 1) Points; 2) Goal difference; 3) Goals scored; 4) Head-to-head points; 5) Head-to-head goal difference; 6) Head-to-head away goals scored (only if two teams); 7) Head-to-head goals scored; 8) Draw; 9) Play-off. (Note: Criteria 2, 3 and 8 is only used if not deciding Champion, teams for UEFA competitions or relegation).
(C) Champions; (R) Relegated

== Results ==
Home \ Away	BOR	CEM	KUM	MGP	NAP	OSO	PEL	POB	RAB	SAS	SIL	SLO	TIK	VAR
Borec	—	0–0	2–2	1–0	2–2	4–1	1–2	2–0	1–0	2–1	1–2	0–3	5–1	1–1
Cementarnica 55	3–1	—	1–0	2–1	4–0	4–0	3–2	0–0	0–1	1–0	3–1	2–2	1–1	2–0
Kumanovo	0–3 (Note: Match awarded)	0–0	—	0–1	2–2	3–1	1–2	0–2	0–2	1–2	2–0	0–2	0–3	0–8
Makedonija	0–0	0–2	4–1	—	1–0	2–0	1–2	3–1	0–1	2–1	0–0	0–0	3–2	3–1
Napredok	3–0	0–1	10–0	0–1	—	1–1	3–3	0–8	1–0	2–0	0–3	0–0	1–1	2–2
Osogovo	2–1	1–4	3–0	2–2	3–1	—	1–2	0–0	2–0	1–1	2–1	0–2	4–1	1–0
Pelister	3–0	5–1	4–0	2–0	4–1	3–1	—	2–2	1–0	3–1	3–0	0–2	1–0	1–1
Pobeda	2–0	3–1	6–1	1–0	1–0	2–1	2–0	—	3–4	4–0	2–0	1–1	4–0	5–2
Rabotnichki	1–0	3–0	4–0	3–0	4–0	3–1	0–0	1–0	—	0–2	2–1	0–3	2–1	2–1
Sasa	0–1	1–0	5–1	0–1	1–0	1–1	1–1	1–1	1–4	—	1–1	0–2	1–0	0–2
Sileks	6–0	2–1	2–0	1–1	1–0	4–2	2–0	2–2	2–2	0–0	—	4–0	5–0	2–1
Sloga Jugomagnat	4–0	3–1	1–0	2–2	4–0	3–0	1–0	0–0	4–0	3–0	1–0	—	6–1	2–0
Tikvesh	2–1	1–4	3–2	2–1	0–0	5–3	2–0	1–3	2–0	0–1	3–1	1–3	—	2–0
Vardar	1–1	1–4	4–0	1–0	3–1	3–0	3–2	1–2	0–2	0–0	0–0	1–1	2–2	—

Source: RSSSF.org
Legend: Blue = home team win; Yellow = draw; Red = away team win.

== Top goalscorers ==
Rank	Player	Club	Goals
1	(North Macedonia) Argjend Beqiri	Sloga Jugomagnat	19
2	(North Macedonia) Dejan Ristovski	Cementarnica	16
3	(North Macedonia) Dejvi Glavevski	Pelister	13
3	(North Macedonia) Nikolche Zdravevski	Pobeda	13
5	(North Macedonia) Antonio Tasev	Tikvesh	12
6	(North Macedonia) Toni Micevski	Pelister	11
7	(North Macedonia) Zhanko Savov	Cementarnica	10
7	(North Macedonia) Goran Petreski	Vardar	10
7	(North Macedonia) Zoran Miserdovski	Sloga Jugomagnat	10
7	(North Macedonia) Dragan Dimitrovski	Tikvesh	10

Source: Top15goalscorers.blogspot.com

== See also ==
- 1999–2000 Macedonian Football Cup
- 1999–2000 Macedonian Second Football League
