= 2000–01 Macedonian First Football League =

Macedonian First League
- Season: 2000–01
- Dates: 20 August 2000 – 27 May 2001
- Champions: Sloga Jugomagnat; 3rd domestic title
- Relegated: Sasa; Shkëndija; Borec; Tikvesh
- Champions League: Sloga Jugomagnat
- UEFA Cup: Vardar; Pelister
- Intertoto Cup: Pobeda
- Matches played: 182
- Goals scored: 595 (3.27 per match)
- Top goalscorer: Argjend Beqiri (27 goals)
- Biggest home win: Belasica 10–0 Borec (15 April 2001)
- Biggest away win: Tikvesh 0–7 Pelister (5 November 2000)
- Highest scoring: Belasica 10–0 Borec (15 April 2001)

The 2000–01 Macedonian First League was the 9th season of the Macedonian First Football League, the highest football league of Macedonia. The first matches of the season were played on 20 August 2000 and the last on 27 May 2001. Sloga Jugomagnat defended their championship title, having won their third title in a row. Due to the change of the league structure (the league was reduced to 12 clubs from the following season), the bottom four teams were relegated.

== Promotion and relegation ==
At the start of the 2000–01 season

Promoted from 1999–2000 Second League

- Shkëndija HB (Winners; West)
- Belasica (Winners; East)

Relegated to 2000–01 Second League

- Napredok (13th)
- Kumanovo (14th)

At the end of the 2000–01 season

Promoted from 2000–01 Second League

- Kumanovo (winners)
- Napredok (runners-up)

Relegated to 2001–02 Second League

- Sasa (11th)
- Shkëndija HB (12th)
- Borec MHK (13th)
- Tikvesh (14th)

== Participating teams ==
Location of teams in 2000–01 Macedonian First League

Club	City	Stadium
Belasica Geras Cunev	Strumica	Stadion Mladost
Borec MHK	Veles	Gradski stadion Veles
Cementarnica 55	Skopje	Stadion Cementarnica
Makedonija Asiba	Skopje	Stadion Gjorche Petrov
Osogovo	Kochani	Stadion Nikola Mantov
Pelister	Bitola	Stadion Tumbe Kafe
Pobeda	Prilep	Stadion Goce Delchev
Rabotnichki Kometal	Skopje	Gradski stadion Skopje
Sasa	Makedonska Kamenica	Gradski stadion Makedonska Kamenica
Shkëndija HB	Tetovo	Gradski stadion Tetovo
Sileks	Kratovo	Stadion Sileks
Sloga Jugomagnat	Skopje	Chair Stadium
Tikvesh	Kavadarci	Gradski stadion Kavadarci
Vardar	Skopje	Gradski stadion Skopje

== League table ==
Pos	Team	Pld	W	D	L	GF	GA	GD	Pts	Qualification or relegation
1	Sloga Jugomagnat (C)	26	20	3	3	61	15	+46	63 (Note: Head-to-head record: Vardar–Sloga Jugomagnat 0–0, Sloga Jugomagnat–Vardar 2–0.)	Qualification for the Champions League first qualifying round
2	Vardar	26	20	3	3	52	16	+36	63	Qualification for the UEFA Cup qualifying round
3	Pobeda	26	18	2	6	64	27	+37	56	Qualification for the Intertoto Cup first round
4	Belasica	26	17	4	5	56	22	+34	55	
5	Sileks	26	14	1	11	52	40	+12	43	
6	Rabotnichki Kometal	26	12	3	11	43	36	+7	39	
7	Cementarnica 55	26	11	3	12	38	31	+7	36	
8	Pelister	26	10	4	12	41	38	+3	34 (Note: Head-to-head record: Pelister–Osogovo 4–1, Osogovo–Pelister 1–0.)	Qualification for the UEFA Cup qualifying round (Note: Pelister qualified for the UEFA Cup qualifying round by winning the 2000–01 Macedonian Football Cup.)
9	Osogovo	26	10	4	12	39	42	−3	34	
10	Makedonija	26	9	4	13	46	42	+4	31	
11	Sasa (R)	26	8	5	13	39	47	−8	29	Relegation to the Macedonian Second League
12	Shkëndija (R)	26	9	1	16	34	49	−15	28	Relegation to the Macedonian Second League
13	Borec (R)	26	4	1	21	18	80	−62	13	Relegation to the Macedonian Second League
14	Tikvesh (R)	26	1	0	25	12	110	−98	3	Relegation to the Macedonian Second League

Source: MacedonianFootball.com, RSSSF.org
Rules for classification: 1) Points; 2) Goal difference; 3) Goals scored; 4) Head-to-head points; 5) Head-to-head goal difference; 6) Head-to-head away goals scored (only if two teams); 7) Head-to-head goals scored; 8) Draw; 9) Play-off. (Note: Criteria 2, 3 and 8 is only used if not deciding Champion, teams for UEFA competitions or relegation).
(C) Champions; (R) Relegated

== Results ==
Home \ Away	BEL	BOR	CEM	MGP	OSO	PEL	POB	RAB	SAS	SKE	SIL	SLO	TIK	VAR
Belasica	—	10–0	1–0	1–1	1–0	2–3	3–1	2–1	3–1	2–0	3–1	0–0	4–0	0–1
Borec	2–4	—	1–2	0–2	0–1	2–2	1–4	1–0	0–1	1–0	1–0	2–3	0–2	0–2
Cementarnica 55	0–3	6–0	—	0–0	0–0	1–0	1–0	1–2	3–0	2–1	4–1	0–1	6–0	2–3
Makedonija	2–3	7–1	1–0	—	3–0	1–1	1–5	1–2	2–1	2–0	1–2	1–4	6–0	2–3
Osogovo	0–0	4–0	3–2	3–3	—	1–0	1–2	2–0	2–2	4–1	2–0	0–2	3–0	1–2
Pelister	0–2	5–1	1–0	1–0	4–1	—	0–1	0–0	3–2	4–1	3–1	0–2	2–0	0–1
Pobeda	3–1	2–0	1–1	3–0	7–2	3–1	—	3–0	3–0	3–1	2–0	2–1	4–1	3–0
Rabotnichki	1–1	3–0	2–1	3–1	3–2	3–2	2–0	—	1–0	5–0	2–3	0–2	4–1	2–3
Sasa	0–1	2–1	1–1	2–0	1–1	3–0	2–0	2–2	—	5–1	0–2	0–4	6–0	0–0
Shkëndija	2–0	3–0	0–1	0–3 (Note: Match awarded)	1–0	1–1	0–2	2–1	3–1	—	3–2	1–2	6–0	0–2
Sileks	2–1	4–0	4–1	4–2	1–2	4–0	4–1	2–0	4–3	2–0	—	0–3	2–0	0–1
Sloga Jugomagnat	0–1	3–0	3–0	1–0	3–0	2–0	3–2	3–0	4–1	0–1	2–2	—	7–2	2–0
Tikvesh	0–6	1–4	0–2	0–4	0–3	0–7	1–7	0–4	2–3	1–5	1–4	0–4	—	0–4
Vardar	1–2	7–0	2–0	2–0	2–0	3–1	0–0	1–0	4–0	2–0	3–1	0–0	3–0	—

Source: RSSSF.org
Legend: Blue = home team win; Yellow = draw; Red = away team win.

== Top goalscorers ==
Rank	Player	Club	Goals
1	(North Macedonia) Argjend Beqiri	Sloga Jugomagnat	27
2	(Bulgaria) Mario Petkov	Makedonija G.P.	19
3	(Federal Republic of Yugoslavia) Ljubiša Nikolić	Belasica	16
4	(North Macedonia) Sasho Krstev	Pobeda	13
5	(North Macedonia) Nikolche Zdravevski	Pobeda	12
5	(North Macedonia) Vancho Micevski	Pelister	12
5	(North Macedonia) Ahmet Ahmetović	Sileks	12
9	(North Macedonia) Miroslav Gjokić	Pobeda	11
9	(North Macedonia) Zoran Miserdovski	Vardar	11

Source: Soccerbot.com

== See also ==
- 2000–01 Macedonian Football Cup
- 2000–01 Macedonian Second Football League
