= 2001–02 Macedonian Football Cup =

Tournament details
- Country: Macedonia
- Dates: 5 August 2001 – 23 May 2002
- Teams: 32

Final positions
- Champions: Pobeda (1st title)
- Runners-up: Cementarnica

Tournament statistics
- Matches played: 41
- Goals scored: 150 (3.66 per match)

The 2001–02 Macedonian Football Cup was the 10th season of Macedonia's football knockout competition. Pelister were the defending champions, having won their first title. The 2001–02 champions were Pobeda who won their first title as well.

== Competition calendar ==
| Round | Date(s) | Fixtures | Clubs | New entries |
|---|---|---|---|---|
| First Round | 5 August 2001 | 16 | 32 → 16 | 32 |
| Second Round | 12, 19 September 2001 | 16 | 16 → 8 | none |
| Quarter-finals | 17 October & 9 December 2001 | 8 | 8 → 4 | none |
| Semi-finals | 3 April & 15 May 2002 | 4 | 4 → 2 | none |
| Final | 23 May 2002 | 1 | 2 → 1 | none |

== First round ==
Matches were played on 5 August 2001.

| Team 1 | Score | Team 2 |
|---|---|---|
5 August 2001
| Metalurg (3) | 2–4 | Pobeda (1) |
| Sasa (2) | 1–1 (6–5 p) | Napredok (1) |
| Ohrid (2) | 1–10 | Rabotnichki Kometal (1) |
| Metalurg Veles (3) | 0–3 (w/o) | Belasica (1) |
| Skopje (3) | 2–3 | Borec (2) |
| Mladost (3) | 0–4 | Pelister (1) |
| Osogovo (1) | 3–0 (w/o) | Teteks (2) |
| Sileks (1) | 7–0 | Sloga Vinica (2) |
| Vardar (1) | 2–0 | Kumanovo (1) |
| Bregalnica Delchevo (2) | 3–0 (w/o) | Shkëndija HB (x) |
| Venec (3) | 0–4 | Makedonija G.P. (1) |
| Rabotnik (3) | 0–1 | Tikvesh (1) |
| Gostivar (3) | 1–2 | Sloga Jugomagnat (1) |
| Alumina (2) | 0–2 | Cementarnica (1) |
| Kozhuf (2) | 3–2 | 11 Oktomvri (2) |
| Karaorman (2) | 3–1 | Novaci (3) |

== Second round ==
The first legs were played on 12 September and second were played on 19 September 2001.

| Team 1 | Agg. | Team 2 | 1st leg | 2nd leg |
|---|---|---|---|---|
| Sloga Jugomagnat (1) | 6–2 | Belasica (1) | 4–1 | 2–1 |
| Bregalnica Delchevo (2) | 2–4 | Sileks (1) | 2–1 | 0–3 |
| Vardar (1) | 8–1 | Sasa (2) | 2–0 | 6–1 |
| Borec (2) | 1–6 | Pobeda (1) | 0–1 | 1–5 |
| Osogovo (1) | 3–2 | Kozhuf (2) | 2–1 | 1–1 |
| Pelister (1) | 2–3 | Cementarnica (1) | 1–2 | 1–1 |
| Makedonija G.P. (1) | 2–3 | Karaorman (2) | 1–1 | 1–2 |
| Rabotnichki Kometal (1) | 2–3 | Tikvesh (1) | 0–2 | 2–1 |

== Quarter-finals ==
The first legs were played on 17 October and second were played on 9 December 2001.

=== Summary ===
| Team 1 | Agg. | Team 2 | 1st leg | 2nd leg |
|---|---|---|---|---|
| Sloga Jugomagnat (1) | 4–2 | Tikvesh (1) | 3–0 | 1–2 |
| Cementarnica (1) | 6–4 | Sileks (1) | 6–2 | 0–2 |
| Karaorman (2) | 2–5 | Pobeda (1) | 1–1 | 1–4 |
| Vardar (1) | 10–0 | Osogovo (1) | 7–0 | 3–0 |

=== Matches ===
17 October 2001
15:00 CEST

| Sloga Jugomagnat (1) | 3–0 | Tikvesh (1) |
|---|---|---|
| Beqiri 49'; Arif 77'; Beganovikj 85' | Report |

Stadion Chair, Skopje
Attendance: 500
Referee: Dragan Stojanovski (Kumanovo)
9 December 2001
13:00 CET

| Tikvesh (1) | 2–1 | Sloga Jugomagnat (1) |
|---|---|---|
| Donev 54'; Evtimov 81' | Report | Beqiri 18' |

Gradski stadion, Kavadarci

Sloga Jugomagnat won 4–2 on aggregate.

17 October 2001
15:00 CEST

| Cementarnica 55 (1) | 6–2 | Sileks (1) |
|---|---|---|
| Toleski 15', 16', 60', 63', 75'; Trpkovski 52' | Report | Ignatov 20', 65' |

Stadion Cementarnica, Skopje
Referee: Bekim Bauta (Struga)
9 December 2001
13:00 CET

| Sileks (1) | 2–0 | Cementarnica 55 (1) |
|---|---|---|
| Trajchev 23' (pen.); Postolov 35' | Report |

Stadion Sileks, Kratovo

Cementarnica 55 won 6–4 on aggregate.

17 October 2001
15:00 CEST

| Karaorman (2) | 1–1 | Pobeda (1) |
|---|---|---|
| Krstanovski 85' | Report | Gjokikj 77' |

Gradska Plazha, Struga
Attendance: 1,000
Referee: Gorancho Fidanovski (Skopje)
9 December 2001
13:00 CET

| Pobeda (1) | 4–1 | Karaorman (2) |
|---|---|---|
| Gjokikj 12', 31', 58', 81' | Report | Nestorovski 15' |

Stadion Goce Delchev, Prilep

Pobeda won 5–2 on aggregate.

17 October 2001
15:00 CEST

| Vardar (1) | 7–0 | Osogovo (1) |
|---|---|---|
| Bajevski 10', 64'; Petkov 18'; Nachevski 50'; Braga 52'; Georgievski 55'; Dimov 60' | Report |

Gradski stadion, Skopje
Attendance: 200
Referee: Toni Gligorov (Strumica)
9 December 2001
13:00 CET

| Osogovo (1) | 0–3 | Vardar (1) |
|---|---|---|
| | Report | Bozhinov 31', 72'; Zaharievski 55' |

Stadion Nikola Mantov, Kochani
Attendance: 1,000
Referee: Goran Spirkoski (Prilep)

Vardar won 10–0 on aggregate.

== Semi-finals ==
The first legs were played on 3 April and the second were played on 15 May 2002.

=== Summary ===
| Team 1 | Agg. | Team 2 | 1st leg | 2nd leg |
|---|---|---|---|---|
| Pobeda (1) | 3–0 | Sloga Jugomagnat (1) | 2–0 | 1–0 |
| Cementarnica (1) | (a) 2–2 | Vardar (1) | 0–0 | 2–2 |

=== Matches ===
3 April 2002
15:30 CEST

| Pobeda (1) | 2–0 | Sloga Jugomagnat (1) |
|---|---|---|
| Georgioski 27'; Gjokić 46' | Report |

Stadion Goce Delchev, Prilep
Attendance: 800
Referee: Blagoja Shuklev (Stojakovo)
15 May 2002
17:00 CEST

| Sloga Jugomagnat (1) | 0−1 | Pobeda (1) |
|---|---|---|
| | | Krstev 7' |

Stadion Chair, Skopje

Pobeda won 3–0 on aggregate.

3 April 2002
15:30 CEST

| Cementarnica 55 (1) | 0–0 | Vardar (1) |
|---|---|---|
| | Report |

Stadion Cementarnica, Skopje
Attendance: 1,300
Referee: Delcho Jakimovski (Skopje)
15 May 2002
17:00 CEST

| Vardar (1) | 2−2 | Cementarnica 55 (1) |
|---|---|---|
| Kirovski 17'; Todorovski 29' | Report | Novakov 8' (o.g.); Georgiev 38' |

Gradski stadion, Skopje
Attendance: 500
Referee: Ilija Davchev (Veles)

2–2 on aggregate. Cementarnica 55 won on away goals.

== Final ==
23 May 2002
20:00 CEST

| Cementarnica 55 (1) | 1–3 | Pobeda (1) |
|---|---|---|
| Toleski 78' | Report 1 Report 2 | Gjokikj 21'; Kjumbev 86'; Ristevski 90' (pen.) |

Stadion Mladost, Strumica
Attendance: 5,500
Referee: Angel Bungurov (Kavadarci)

== See also ==
- 2001–02 Macedonian First Football League
- 2001–02 Macedonian Second Football League
