= 1999–2000 Macedonian Second Football League =

Macedonian Second League
- Season: 1999–2000
- Champions: Belasica (East); Shkëndija Tetovo (West)
- Promoted: Belasica; Shkëndija Tetovo
- Relegated: 19 clubs: Tiverija; Bregalnica Shtip; Metalurg Veles; Udarnik; Kozhuf; Dojransko Ezero; Belo Brdo; Ovche Pole; Karposh 93; Butel; Madjari Solidarnost; Voska; Skopje; Korab; Balkan; Bitola; Prespa; Gostivar; Veleshta

The 1999–2000 Macedonian Second Football League was the eighth season since its establishment. It began in August 1999 and ended in May 2000. Due to change of the league structure in season 2000–01, the 19 teams was relegated.

== East ==
=== Participating teams ===
Location of teams in 1999–2000 Macedonian Second League - East

Club	City
Bashkimi	Kumanovo
Belasica	Strumica
Belo Brdo	Shtip
Bregalnica Delchevo	Delchevo
Bregalnica Shtip	Shtip
Dojransko Ezero	Nov Dojran
Jaka	Radovish
Karposh 93	Kumanovo
Kozhuf	Gevgelija
Malesh	Berovo
Metalurg	Veles
Ovche Pole	Sveti Nikole
Sloga	Vinica
Tiverija	Strumica
Udarnik	Pirava
Vardar	Negotino

=== League standing ===
Pos	Team	Pld	W	D	L	GF	GA	GD	Pts	Promotion or relegation
1	Belasica (C, P)	30	27	0	3	116	19	+97	81	Promotion to Macedonian First League
2	Sloga Vinica	30	20	2	8	81	28	+53	62	
3	Bashkimi	30	18	3	9	79	35	+44	57	
4	Jaka Radovish	30	16	7	7	54	33	+21	55	
5	Bregalnica Delchevo	30	17	4	9	66	49	+17	55	
6	Malesh	30	16	4	10	52	33	+19	52	
7	Vardar Negotino	30	16	2	12	62	50	+12	50	
8	Tiverija (R)	30	15	2	13	31	50	−19	47	Qualification to Relegation playoffs
9	Bregalnica Shtip (R)	30	13	6	11	63	34	+29	45	Relegation to Macedonian Third League
10	Metalurg Veles (R)	30	13	5	12	47	43	+4	44	Relegation to Macedonian Third League
11	Udarnik (R)	30	12	2	16	31	52	−21	38	Relegation to Macedonian Third League
12	Kozhuf (R)	30	9	2	19	51	83	−32	29	Relegation to Macedonian Third League
13	Dojransko Ezero (R)	30	8	3	19	32	77	−45	27	Relegation to Macedonian Third League
14	Belo Brdo (R)	30	7	3	20	35	74	−39	24	Relegation to Macedonian Third League
15	Ovche Pole (R)	30	4	3	23	27	96	−69	15	Relegation to Macedonian Third League
16	Karposh 93 (R)	30	4	2	24	32	103	−71	14	Relegation to Macedonian Third League

Source: MacedonianFootball.com and rsssf.org
Rules for classification: 1) Points; 2) Head-to-head points; 3) Head-to-head goal difference; 4) Head-to-head away goals scored
(C) Champions; (P) Promoted; (R) Relegated

== West ==
=== Participating teams ===
Location of teams in 1999–2000 Macedonian Second League - West

Club	City
Alumina	Skopje
Balkan	Skopje
Bitola	Bitola
Butel	Skopje
Gostivar	Gostivar
Jugohrom	Jegunovce
Karaorman	Struga
Korab	Debar
Madjari Solidarnost	Skopje
Novaci	Novaci
Ohrid	Ohrid
Prespa	Resen
Shkëndija Arachinovo	Arachinovo
Shkëndija Tetovo	Tetovo
Skopje	Skopje
Teteks	Tetovo
Veleshta	Veleshta
Voska	Ohrid

=== League standing ===
Pos	Team	Pld	W	D	L	GF	GA	GD	Pts	Promotion or relegation
1	Shkëndija HB (C, P)	34	24	5	5	97	21	+76	77	Promotion to Macedonian First League
2	Karaorman	34	22	4	8	78	42	+36	70	
3	Teteks	34	21	5	8	87	34	+53	68	
4	Novaci	34	21	3	10	79	30	+49	66	
5	Ohrid	34	21	3	10	91	43	+48	66	
6	Jugohrom	34	21	3	10	75	43	+32	66	
7	Alumina	34	20	5	9	102	46	+56	65	
8	Shkëndija Arachinovo (O)	34	20	4	10	93	39	+54	64	Qualification to Relegation playoffs
9	Butel (R)	34	19	4	11	51	29	+22	61	Relegation to Macedonian Third League
10	Madjari Solidarnost (R)	34	16	3	15	79	59	+20	51	Relegation to Macedonian Third League
11	Voska (R)	34	15	2	17	52	71	−19	47	Relegation to Macedonian Third League
12	Skopje (R)	34	14	2	18	63	59	+4	44	Relegation to Macedonian Third League
13	Korab (R)	34	13	1	20	43	83	−40	40	Relegation to Macedonian Third League
14	Balkan (R)	34	10	2	22	46	76	−30	32	Relegation to Macedonian Third League
15	Bitola (R)	34	5	5	24	36	62	−26	20	Relegation to Macedonian Third League
16	Prespa (R)	34	6	2	26	39	125	−86	20	Relegation to Macedonian Third League
17	Gostivar (R)	34	6	1	27	33	151	−118	19	Relegation to Macedonian Third League
18	Veleshta (R)	34	4	2	28	24	155	−131	14	Relegation to Macedonian Third League

Source: MacedonianFootball.com and rsssf.org
Rules for classification: 1) Points; 2) Head-to-head points; 3) Head-to-head goal difference; 4) Head-to-head away goals scored
(C) Champions; (O) Play-off winners; (P) Promoted; (R) Relegated

== Relegation playoff ==
18 June 2000
17:30 CEST

Shkëndija Arachinovo	2–1	Tiverija

Stadion Goce Delchev, Prilep

Shkëndija Arachinovo stayed in the Macedonian Second League, while Tiverija were relegated to the Macedonian Third League.

18 June 2000
17:30 CEST

Mesna Industrija	2–2	Drita
Penalties
	6–5

Stadion Mladost, Strumica

Mesna Industrija promoted to the Macedonian Second League.

18 June 2000
17:30 CEST

Rosoman 83	0–5	Mladost GT Orizari

Gradski stadion, Kumanovo

Mladost GT Orizari promoted to the Macedonian Second League.

18 June 2000
17:30 CEST

Vëllazërimi	1–6	11 Oktomvri

Stadion Zhelezarnica, Skopje

11 Oktomvri promoted to the Macedonian Second League.

Source: Nova Makedonija

== See also ==
- 1999–2000 Macedonian Football Cup
- 1999–2000 Macedonian First Football League
