= 2001–02 Macedonian Second Football League =

Macedonian Second League
- Season: 2001–02
- Champions: Tikvesh
- Promoted: Tikvesh; Bregalnica Delchevo
- Relegated: Drita; Sloga Vinica; Makedonija Vranishta; Jugohrom

The 2001–02 Macedonian Second Football League was the tenth season since its establishment. It began on 22 August 2001 and ended on 29 May 2002.

== Participating teams ==
Location of teams in 2001–02 Macedonian Second League

Club	City
11 Oktomvri	Prilep
Alumina	Skopje
Bashkimi	Kumanovo
Borec	Veles
Bregalnica	Delchevo
Drita	Bogovinje
Jaka	Radovish
Jugohrom	Jegunovce
Karaorman	Struga
Kozhuf	Gevgelija
Makedonija	Vranishta
Novaci	Novaci
Ohrid 2001	Ohrid
Sasa	Makedonska Kamenica
Sloga	Vinica
Tikvesh	Kavadarci
Teteks	Tetovo
Turnovo	Turnovo

== League standing ==
Pos	Team	Pld	W	D	L	GF	GA	GD	Pts	Promotion or relegation
1	Tikvesh (C, P)	34	25	4	5	98	25	+73	79	Promotion to Macedonian First League
2	Bregalnica Delchevo (P)	34	24	2	8	95	32	+63	74	Promotion to Macedonian First League
3	Bashkimi	34	22	4	8	86	44	+42	70	
4	Kozhuf	34	16	5	13	68	49	+19	53	
5	Karaorman	34	16	3	15	69	67	+2	51	
6	Turnovo	34	14	8	12	49	50	−1	50	
7	Ohrid 2001	34	16	2	16	67	75	−8	50	
8	Alumina	34	13	10	11	55	37	+18	49	
9	Teteks	34	15	3	16	55	38	+17	48	
10	Jaka Radovish	34	15	3	16	47	54	−7	48	
11	Sasa	34	14	6	14	46	59	−13	48	
12	Novaci	34	14	5	15	49	48	+1	47	
13	Borec	34	14	5	15	37	36	+1	47	
14	11 Oktomvri	34	15	2	17	59	69	−10	47	
15	Drita (R)	34	15	1	18	52	63	−11	46	Relegation to Macedonian Third League
16	Sloga Vinica (R)	34	13	4	17	53	59	−6	43	Relegation to Macedonian Third League
17	Makedonija Vranishta (R)	34	6	5	23	32	92	−60	23	Relegation to Macedonian Third League
18	Jugohrom (R)	34	2	2	30	29	149	−120	8	Relegation to Macedonian Third League

Source: MacedonianFootball.com
Rules for classification: 1) Points; 2) Head-to-head points; 3) Head-to-head goal difference; 4) Head-to-head away goals scored
(C) Champions; (P) Promoted; (R) Relegated

== Results ==
Home \ Away	OKT	ALU	BAS	BOR	BRD	DRI	JAK	JUG	KAR	KOZ	MVR	NOV	OHR	SAS	SLV	TET	TIK	TUR
11 Oktomvri	—	2–0	1–2	2–1	3–5	1–0			4–2	2–1	2–0	1–4	1–1	1–0	1–0	1–2		4–2
Alumina	0–0	—	2–1	0–0		2–0	2–0	7–0		0–0				0–0	5–0		0–0	6–0
Bashkimi	2–0	4–0	—	3–0	3–1	3–0			1–1			4–2	6–1	4–0	2–0	1–0		2–1
Borec		1–0	0–2	—		1–0	1–1		0–0	0–1		3–1	1–0	2–0	2–0		1–0	1–1
Bregalnica Delchevo	5–1	2–0	4–0	2–1	—		5–0	9–0	2–0		7–0		4–1	4–0		1–0		4–0
Drita	7–2		0–2		0–1	—		2–1	1–0		4–0				4–2	0–1	1–0	2–2
Jaka Radovish		1–1	1–3	1–0	2–1	2–0	—	3–0	1–4	1–0		2–0		0–2		3–0	0–1	2–0
Jugohrom	1–3						0–3	—		2–7		1–3		2–6	3–0 (Note: Match awarded)	1–3	2–9	0–5
Karaorman	4–3	4–1			2–1	2–3	4–6	6–0	—		3–2	1–1	1–0	1–0			2–3	3–0
Kozhuf		0–0	4–3	2–1	2–0		3–0	4–1		—	1–0	3–2				2–0		0–0
Makedonija Vranishta	1–0		1–4		0–4	2–1		5–0	0–2	1–1	—		2–4	1–2				0–0
Novaci	1–2	2–0	3–2	0–2	2–1			0–0	0–1	0–1	2–0	—	3–2	4–0		1–0	1–2	1–0
Ohrid	5–2	0–3	2–1	0–2		2–1	2–0		4–3	0–5	0–3	2–0	—			2–0	1–3	1–1
Sasa			1–1	2–1	0–2	1–2		5–0	3–1	2–1	1–1			—	1–1	2–1	0–0	3–1
Sloga Vinica		0–0	6–2	1–0		4–1	2–0	10–0	0–1	3–1	5–3	1–1	2–1		—	1–0	0–3	1–2
Teteks		1–0			2–1	4–0	0–0		3–0		3–0	2–3	1–2	3–0		—	0–1	2–2
Tikvesh	4–0	3–0	2–0		3–1		6–1	3–0		1–0	9–0	2–0	5–1	8–0	2–0	3–1	—	2–1
Turnovo	3–0	0–0	0–2	0–0	1–2	2–0	1–0	2–1	4–2	2–1	3–0	3–1	2–4	2–1	3–1	1–0	2–1	—

Source: Turnovo's results on Facebook, A1 (Round 1), Vest (Round 2), Makedonski Sport (Round 4), Makedonski Sport (Round 7), A1 (Round 8), A1 (Round 10), A1 (Round 11), A1 (Round 12), Vest (Round 13): , , Vest (Round 15), Vest (Round 16), A1 (Round 17), A1 (Round 18), A1 (Round 19), A1 (Round 20), A1 (Round 21), A1 (Round 22), A1 (Round 23), A1 (Round 24), A1 (Round 25), A1 (Round 26), A1 (Round 27), Vest (Round 30), Vest (Round 33), Vest (Round 34), Dnevnik (matches awarded to Jugohrom and Alumina)
Legend: Blue = home team win; Yellow = draw; Red = away team win.

== See also ==
- 2001–02 Macedonian Football Cup
- 2001–02 Macedonian First Football League
