= 1999–2000 Macedonian Football Cup =

1999–00 Macedonian Football Cup
Tournament details
- Country: Macedonia
- Dates: 15 September 1999 – 20 May 2000
- Teams: 32

Final positions
- Champions: Sloga Jugomagnat (2nd title)
- Runners-up: Pobeda

Tournament statistics
- Matches played: 76
- Goals scored: 306 (4.03 per match)

The 1999–2000 Macedonian Football Cup was the 8th season of Macedonia's football knockout competition. Vardar were the defending champions, having won their fourth title. The 11999–2000 champions were Sloga Jugomagnat who won their second title.

== Competition calendar ==
Round	Date(s)	Fixtures	Clubs	New entries
First Round	15 September 1999	16	32 → 16	32
Group stage	22, 29 September, 20 October, 10, 28 November 1999 & 27 February 2000	48	16 → 8	none
Quarter-finals	15, 22 March 2000	8	8 → 4	none
Semi-finals	5, 19, 20 April 2000	4	4 → 2	none
Final	20 May 2000	1	2 → 1	none

== First round ==
Team 1	Score	Team 2
Shkëndija HB	0–1	Cementarnica
Galeb	0–6	Vardar
BSK Bistrica	3–1	Balkan
Osogovo	2–2 (3–4 p)	Bashkimi
Povardarie	0–11	Sileks
Bitola	0–2	Sasa
Belasica	1–2	Makedonija G.P.
Arsimi	3–0 (w/o)	Kumanovo
Butel	0–1	Pobeda
Bregalnica Shtip	2–0	Tikvesh
Novaci	0–1	Rabotnichki Kometal
Ohrid 96	4–0	Skopje
Udarnik	1–2	Napredok
Borec MHK	0–1	Metalurg Veles
Madjari Solidarnost	0–3	Sloga Jugomagnat
Bregalnica Delchevo	0–2	Pelister

== Group stage ==
=== Group 1 ===
Pos	Team	Pld	W	D	L	GF	GA	GD	Pts	Qualification	SLO	RAB	OHR	ARS
1	Sloga Jugomagnat	6	4	1	1	20	11	+9	13	Quarter-finals	—	2–2	6–3	5–0
2	Rabotnichki	6	3	2	1	19	11	+8	11	Quarter-finals	3–1	—	1–1	9–3
3	Ohrid 96	6	3	1	2	19	12	+7	10		3–6	2–1	—	5–0
4	Arsimi	6	0	0	6	7	31	−24	0		1–3	2–3	1–6	—

Source: FY-Soccer.com

=== Group 2 ===
Pos	Team	Pld	W	D	L	GF	GA	GD	Pts	Qualification	CEM	SIL	SAS	MET
1	Cementarnica	6	4	2	0	18	4	+14	14	Quarter-finals	—	3–1	1–1	7–0
2	Sileks	6	4	0	2	22	7	+15	12	Quarter-finals	1–3	—	8–0	5–0
3	Sasa	6	2	2	2	8	11	−3	8		0–0	0–2	—	4–0
4	Metalurg Veles	6	0	0	6	2	28	−26	0		1–4	1–5	0–3	—

Source: FY-Soccer.com

=== Group 3 ===
Pos	Team	Pld	W	D	L	GF	GA	GD	Pts	Qualification	POB	PEL	BAS	BSK
1	Pobeda	6	5	0	1	33	6	+27	15	Quarter-finals	—	5–1	4–1	9–0
2	Pelister	6	4	0	2	22	12	+10	12	Quarter-finals	2–1	—	5–0	5–1
3	Bashkimi	6	3	0	3	9	15	−6	9		0–5	3–1	—	3–0
4	BSK Bistrica	6	0	0	6	5	36	−31	0		2–9	2–8	0–2	—

Source: FY-Soccer.com

=== Group 4 ===
Pos	Team	Pld	W	D	L	GF	GA	GD	Pts	Qualification	VAR	MAK	NAP	BRE
1	Vardar	6	5	0	1	14	6	+8	15	Quarter-finals	—	0–2	4–3	5–0
2	Makedonija G.P.	6	4	1	1	8	3	+5	13	Quarter-finals	1–2	—	2–1	2–0
3	Napredok	6	1	1	4	5	11	−6	4		0–2	0–0	—	1–0
4	Bregalnica Shtip	6	1	0	5	3	10	−7	3		0–1	0–1	3–0	—

Source: FY-Soccer.com

== Quarter-finals ==
The first legs were played on 15 March and second were played on 22 and 23 March 2000.

Team 1	Agg.	Team 2	1st leg	2nd leg
Rabotnichki Kometal	3–2	Cementarnica	1–1	2–1
Sileks	0–4	Sloga Jugomagnat	0–1	0–3
Makedonija G.P.	2–3	Pobeda	0–0	2–3
Pelister	3–1	Vardar	1–0	2–1

== Semi-finals ==
The first legs were played on 5 April and the second were played on 19 and 20 April 2000.

=== Summary ===
Team 1	Agg.	Team 2	1st leg	2nd leg
Pelister	3–4	Pobeda	2–2	1–2
Rabotnichki Kometal	2–4	Sloga Jugomagnat	1–1	1–3

=== Matches ===
5 April 2000

Pelister	2–2	Pobeda
Trenevski 11'; Sterjov 64'	Report	Zdravevski 39'; Naumoski 79' (pen.)

Stadion Tumbe Kafe, Bitola
Attendance: 1,000
Referee: Dushko Stojanovski (Skopje)
19 April 2000

Pobeda	2−1	Pelister
V. Micevski 40'; Naumoski 57' (pen.)	Report	T. Micevski 87'

Stadion Goce Delchev, Prilep
Attendance: 6,000
Referee: Blagoj Shuklev (Stojakovo)

Pobeda won 4–3 on aggregate.

5 April 2000

Rabotnichki Kometal	1–1	Sloga Jugomagnat
Vasevski 82'	Report	Beqiri 53'

Gradski stadion, Skopje
20 April 2000

Sloga Jugomagnat	3–1	Rabotnichki Kometal
Miserdovski 33'; Maznov 48'; Abazi 77'	Report	Miloshevski 40'

Stadion Chair, Skopje
Attendance: 700
Referee: Delcho Jakimovski (Skopje)

Sloga Jugomagnat won 4–2 on aggregate.

== Final ==
20 May 2000
16:00 CEST

Pobeda	0–6	Sloga Jugomagnat
	Report 1 Report 2	Miserdovski 42'; Beqiri 55', 66', 74'; Mustafi 71'; Presilski 81'

Stadion Goce Delchev, Prilep
Attendance: 8,000
Referee: Angel Bungurov (Kavadarci)

== See also ==
- 1999–2000 Macedonian First Football League
- 1999–2000 Macedonian Second Football League
