= Siričino =

Siričino Сиричино
- Village
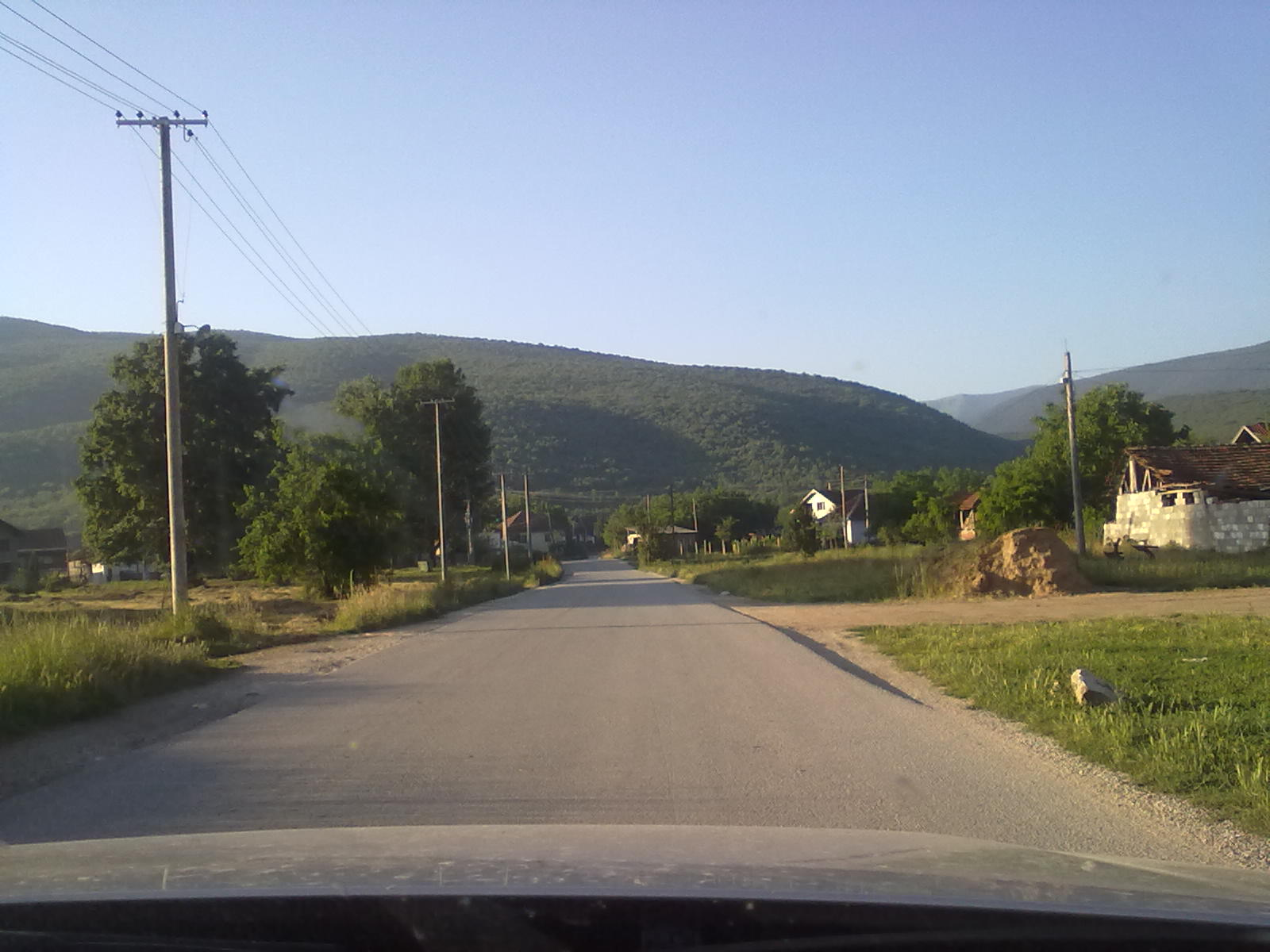

- Location within North Macedonia
- Coordinates: 42.016500°N 21.094125°E
- Country: North Macedonia
- Region: Polog
- Municipality: Jegunovce

Population (2021)
  - Total: 399
- Time zone: UTC+1 (CET)
  - Summer (DST): UTC+2 (CEST)
- Car plates: TE

Siričino (Macedonian: Сиричино) is a village in the municipality of Jegunovce, North Macedonia.

== Demographics ==
Siričino is attested in the 1467/68 Ottoman tax registry (defter) for the Nahiyah of Kalkandelen. The village had a total of 19 Christian households and 1 bachelor.

As of the 2021 census, Siričino had 399 residents with the following ethnic composition:

- Macedonians 363
- Persons for whom data are taken from administrative sources 30
- Others 6

In the 2002 census the village had a total of 395 inhabitants, all of whom were ethnic Macedonians.

In statistics gathered by Vasil Kanchov in 1900, the village of Siričino was inhabited by 330 Christian Bulgarians.
