= Tudence =

Tudence Туденце
- Village
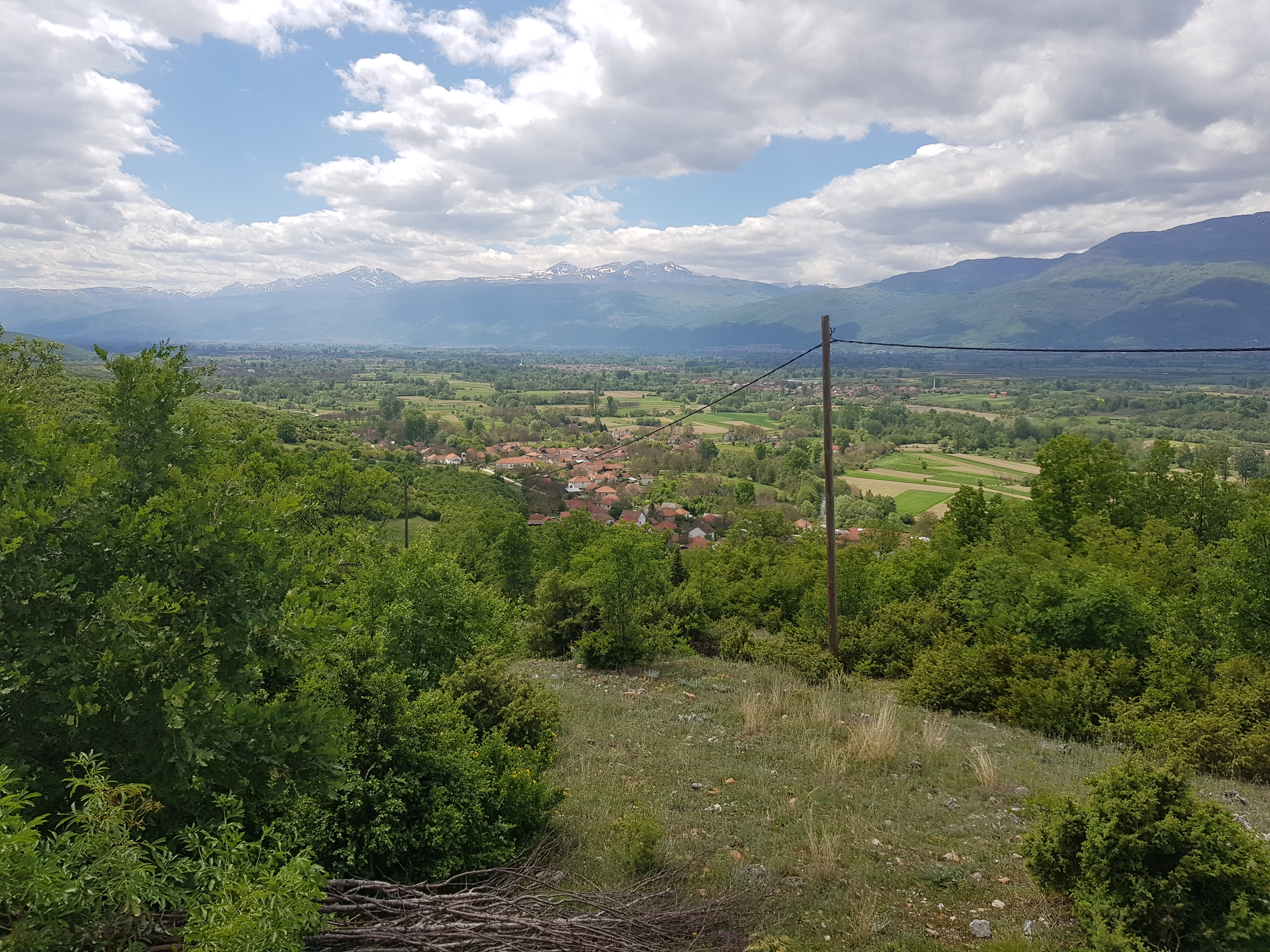
- View of the village

- Location within North Macedonia
- Coordinates: 42°01′48″N 21°07′05″E
- Country: North Macedonia
- Region: Polog
- Municipality: Jegunovce

Population (2002)
  - Total: 431
- Time zone: UTC+1 (CET)
  - Summer (DST): UTC+2 (CEST)
- Car plates: TE

Tudence (Macedonian: Туденце) is a village in the municipality of Jegunovce, North Macedonia.

== Demographics ==
Tudence is attested in the 1467/68 Ottoman tax registry (defter) for the Nahiyah of Kalkandelen. The village had a total of 5 Christian households.

According to the 2002 census, the village had a total of 431 inhabitants. Ethnic groups in the village include:

- Macedonians 430
- Others 1

In statistics gathered by Vasil Kanchov in 1900, the village of Tudence was inhabited by 285 Christian Bulgarians.
