= Blagoj Istatov =

Yugoslav and Macedonian football manager and player (1947–2018)

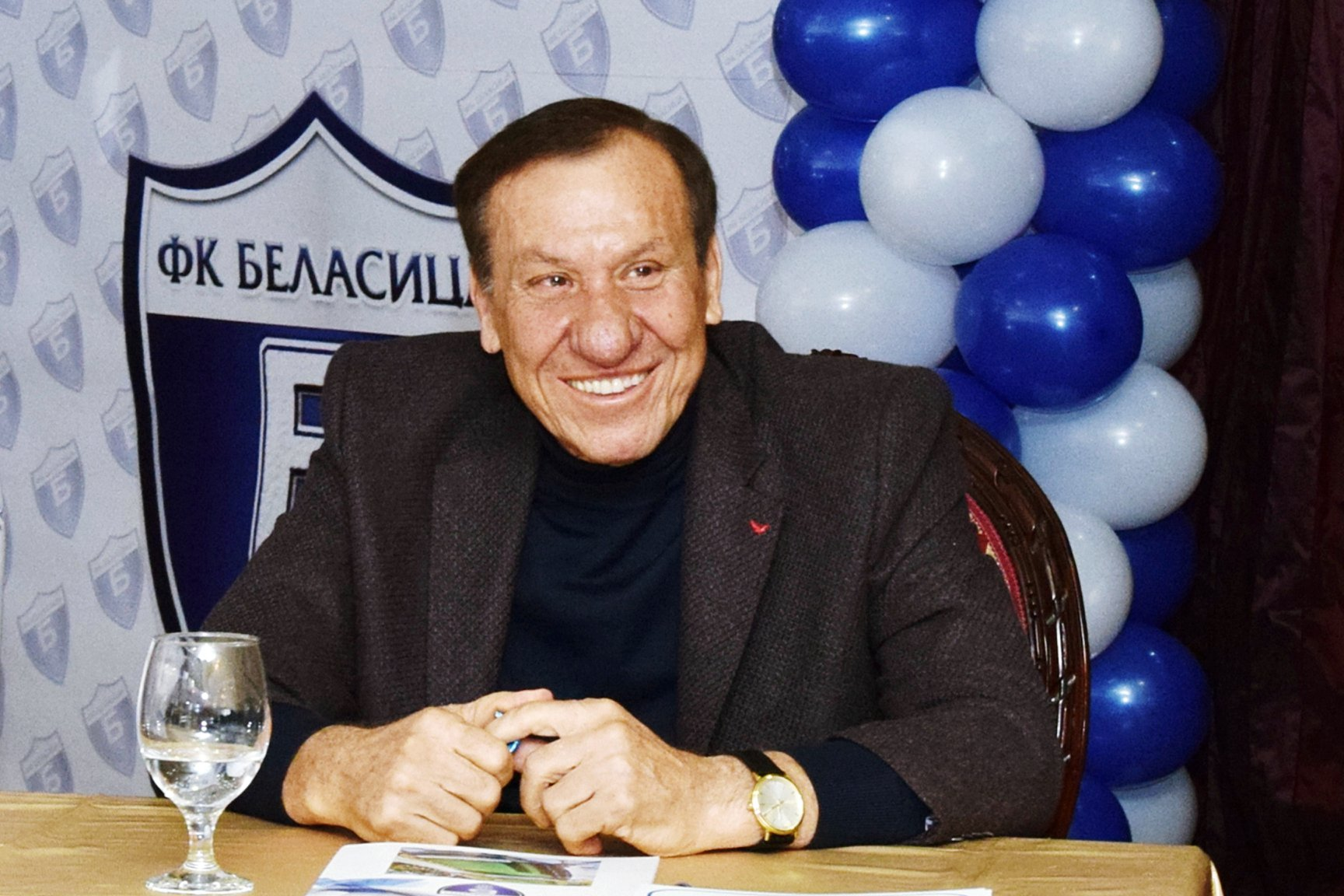
- Istatov in 2013

Personal information
- Date of birth: 5 April 1947
- Place of birth: Strumica, PR Macedonia, FPR Yugoslavia
- Date of death: 27 September 2018 (aged 71)
- Place of death: Strumica, Macedonia
- Position: Goalkeeper

Youth career
- Belasica

Senior career*
Years	Team	Apps	(Gls)
1964–1968	Belasica	14	(0)
1968–1973	Pobeda	144	(0)
1973–1976	Partizan	44	(0)
1976–1978	Utrecht	63	(0)
1978–1983	Belasica	72	(1)
Total		337	(0)

Managerial career
- 1983–1987: Belasica
- 1988–1989: Belasica
- 1990: Belasica
- 1991–1992: Belasica
- 1993: Dojransko Ezero
- 1995–1997: Belasica
- 1997: Skopje
- 1998–1999: Belasica
- 1999–2000: Dojransko Ezero
- 2001–2003: Vardar (assistant)
- * Club domestic league appearances and goals

Blagoj Istatov (Macedonian: Благој Истатов; 5 April 1947 – 27 September 2018) was a Yugoslav and Macedonian football manager and player.

== Playing career ==
Born in Strumica, Istatov started out at local club Belasica, making his senior debut in 1964. He switched to Pobeda in 1968, amassing over 100 appearances in the Yugoslav Second League over the next five seasons.

In 1973, Istatov was transferred to Yugoslav First League side Partizan. He spent three seasons with the Crno-beli, collecting 50 appearances across all competitions. In Partizan's title-winning season of 1975–76, Istatov served as a backup for Radmilo Ivančević, appearing in three games.

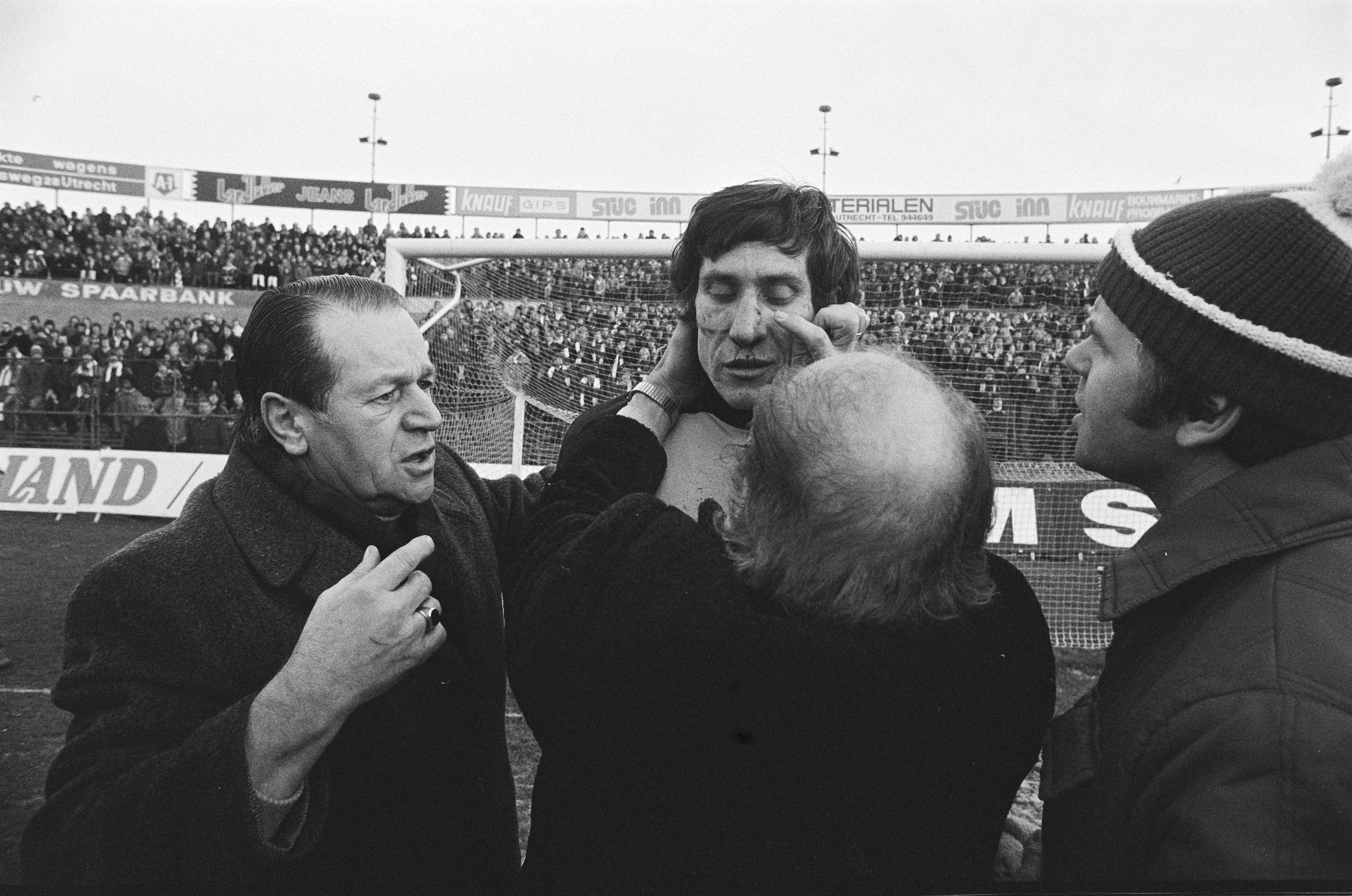
In January 1978, while playing for Utrecht, Istatov suffered a nose injury during a league game with AZ '67

In 1976, Istatov moved abroad and signed with Dutch club Utrecht. He was their first-choice goalkeeper for two seasons, making 63 Eredivisie appearances, before returning to Yugoslavia to finish his career at Belasica.

== Managerial career ==
After hanging up his boots, Istatov served as manager of his parent club Belasica on numerous occasions.

== Career statistics ==
Appearances and goals by club, season and competition
Club	Season	League		
Club	Season	Division	Apps	Goals
Pobeda	1968–69	Yugoslav Second League	19	0
Pobeda	1969–70	Yugoslav Second League	30	0
Pobeda	1970–71	Yugoslav Second League	30	0
Pobeda	1971–72	Yugoslav Second League	34	0
Pobeda	1972–73	Yugoslav Second League	31	0
Pobeda	Total		144	0
Partizan	1973–74	Yugoslav First League	18	0
Partizan	1974–75	Yugoslav First League	23	0
Partizan	1975–76	Yugoslav First League	3	0
Partizan	Total		44	0
Utrecht	1976–77	Eredivisie	33	0
Utrecht	1977–78	Eredivisie	30	0
Utrecht	Total		63	0
Career total			251	0

== Honours ==
As a Player (goalkeeper)

Partizan

- Yugoslav First League
- Winner:1975–76

FK Belasica Strumica

- (Socialist Republic of Macedonia) Macedonian Republic League
- Winner:1983

=== European ===
Utrecht (Netherlands)

- Intertoto Cup/Summer Cup
  - Joint Winners: 1978

As a Menager

FK Belasica Strumica

- (Socialist Republic of Macedonia) Macedonian Republic League
  - Winner :1988
- (Socialist Republic of Macedonia) Macedonian Republic Cup
  - Winner: 1983–84, 1985–86

FK Skopje

- Macedonian Second League:
  - Winner:1997
