= Podbrege =

Podbrege Подбреѓе
- Village
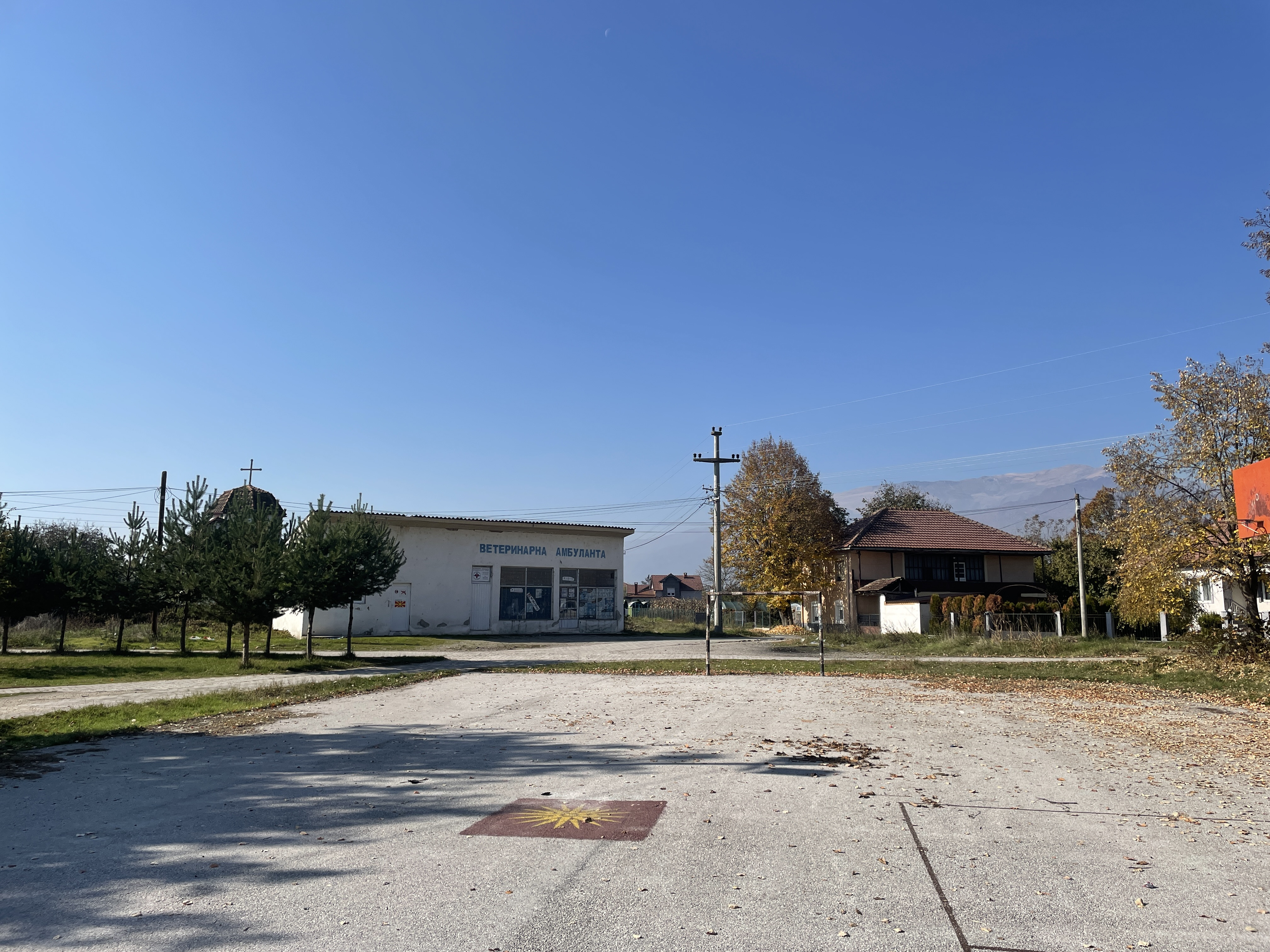

- Location within North Macedonia
- Coordinates: 42.062986°N 21.121371°E
- Country: North Macedonia
- Region: Polog
- Municipality: Jegunovce

Population (2021)
  - Total: 199
- Time zone: UTC+1 (CET)
  - Summer (DST): UTC+2 (CEST)
- Car plates: TE

Podbrege (Macedonian: Подбреѓе) is a village in the municipality of Jegunovce, North Macedonia.

== History ==
Podbrege is attested in the 1467/68 Ottoman tax registry (defter) for the Nahiyah of Kalkandelen. The village had a total of 60 Christian households, 5 bachelors and 6 widows.

A toponym in the village bears the name Arbina, stemming from Arban, the old South Slavic ethnoynm for Albanians, suggesting direct linguistic contact with Albanians or the former presence of an assimilated Albanian community.

== Demographics ==
As of the 2021 census, Podbrege had 199 residents with the following ethnic composition:

- Macedonians 171
- Roma 11
- Serbs 10
- Persons for whom data are taken from administrative sources 7

According to the 2002 census, the village had a total of 179 inhabitants. Ethnic groups in the village include:

- Macedonians 161
- Serbs 1
- Romani 16
- Others 1

In statistics gathered by Vasil Kanchov in 1900, the village of Podbrege (Podorche) was inhabited by 140 Christian Bulgarians.
