= Preljubište =

Preljubište Прељубиште Prelubisht
- Village
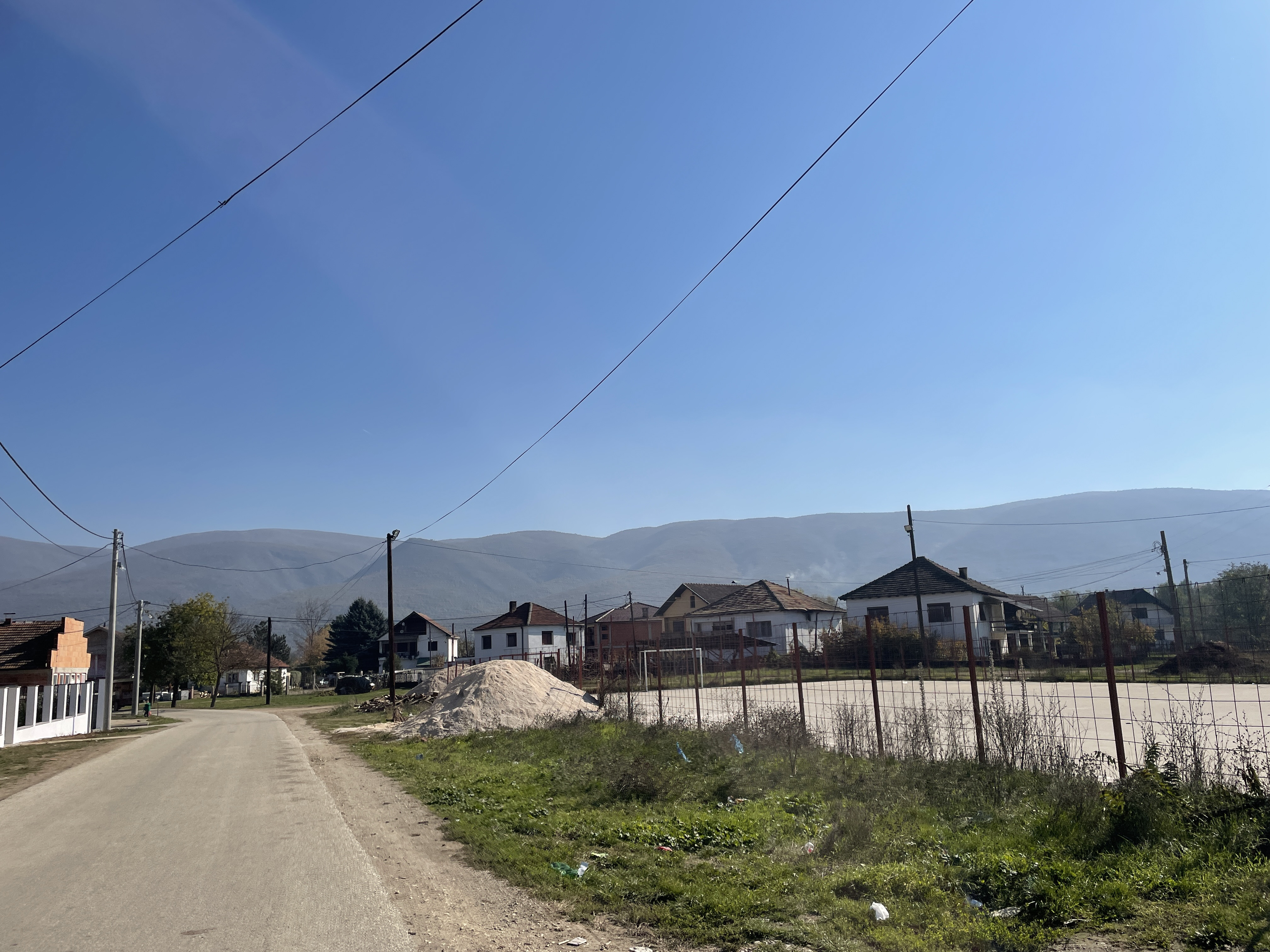
- Houses in the village

- Location within North Macedonia
- Coordinates: 42°02′N 21°06′E
- Country: North Macedonia
- Region: Polog
- Municipality: Jegunovce

Population (2002)
  - Total: 367
- Time zone: UTC+1 (CET)
  - Summer (DST): UTC+2 (CEST)
- Car plates: TE
- Website: .

Preljubište (Macedonian: Прељубиште, Albanian: Prelubisht) is a village in the municipality of Jegunovce, North Macedonia.

== History ==
Preljubište is attested in the 1467/68 Ottoman tax registry (defter) for the Nahiyah of Kalkandelen. The village had a total of 60 Christian households, 2 bachelors and 6 widows.

According to the 1467-68 Ottoman defter, Preljubište exhibits a majority Orthodox Christian Slavic anthroponomy with a minority of Albanian anthroponyms also being present. Some families had a mixed Slav-Albanian anthroponomy.

== Demographics ==
According to the 2002 census, the village had a total of 367 inhabitants. Ethnic groups in the village include:

- Macedonians 270
- Albanians 92
- Romani 4
- Serbs 1

In statistics gathered by Vasil Kanchov in 1900, the village of Preljubište was inhabited by 112 Christian Bulgarians.
