= Jančište =

Jančište Јанчиште
- Village
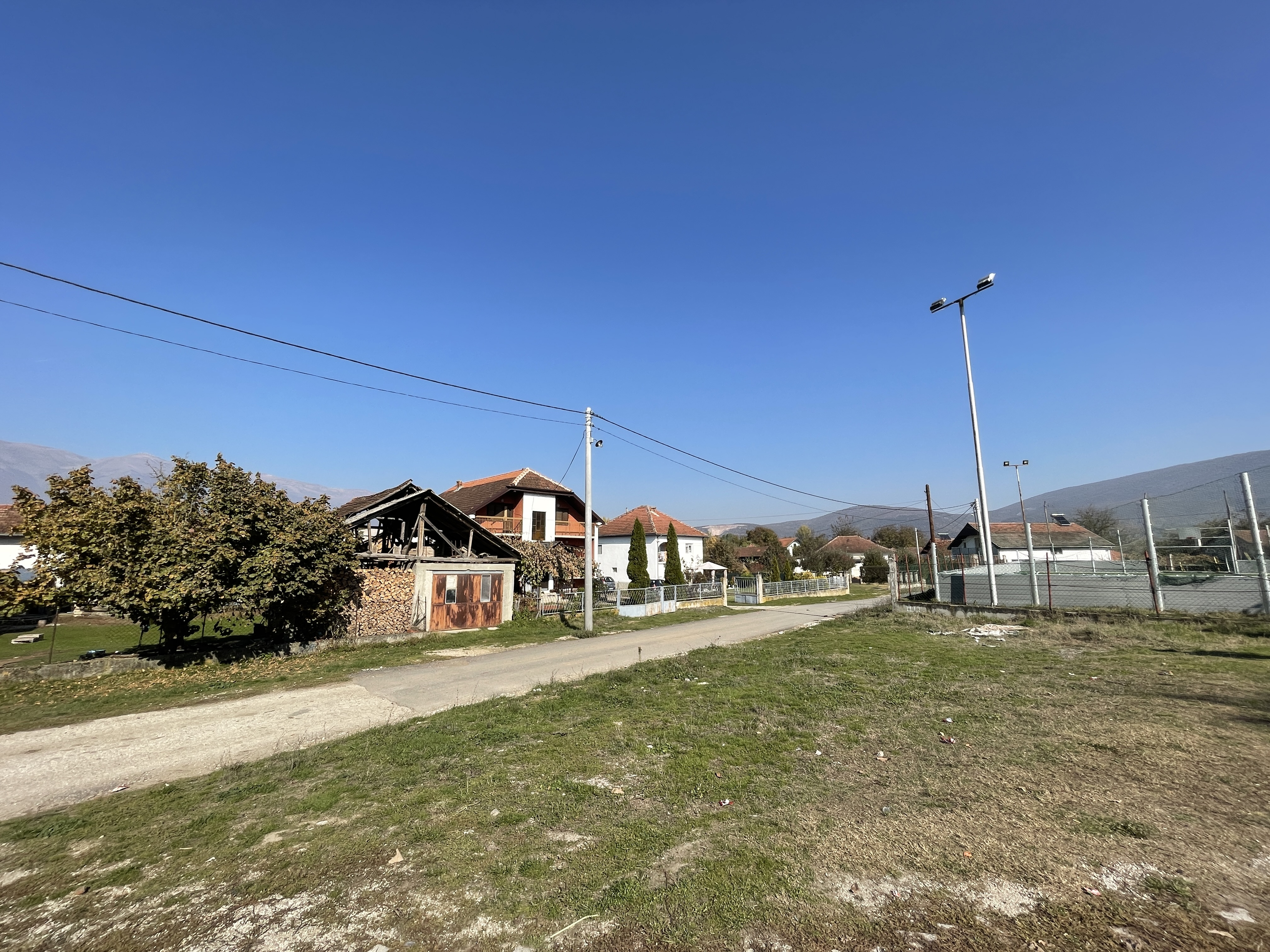
- Houses in the village

- Location within North Macedonia
- Coordinates: 42.053024°N 21.116963°E
- Country: North Macedonia
- Region: Polog
- Municipality: Jegunovce

Population (2002)
  - Total: 587
- Time zone: UTC+1 (CET)
  - Summer (DST): UTC+2 (CEST)
- Car plates: TE

Jančište (Macedonian: Јанчиште) is a village in the municipality of Jegunovce, North Macedonia.

== Demographics ==
Jančište is attested in the 1467/68 Ottoman tax registry (defter) for the Nahiyah of Kalkandelen. The village had a total of 39 Christian households and 2 bachelors.

According to the 2002 census, the village had a total of 587 inhabitants. Ethnic groups in the village include:

- Macedonians 544
- Serbs 43

In statistics gathered by Vasil Kanchov in 1900, the village of Jančište (Yanchista) was inhabited by 145 Christian Bulgarians.
