= Kopance =

Kopance Копанце Kopanicë
- Village
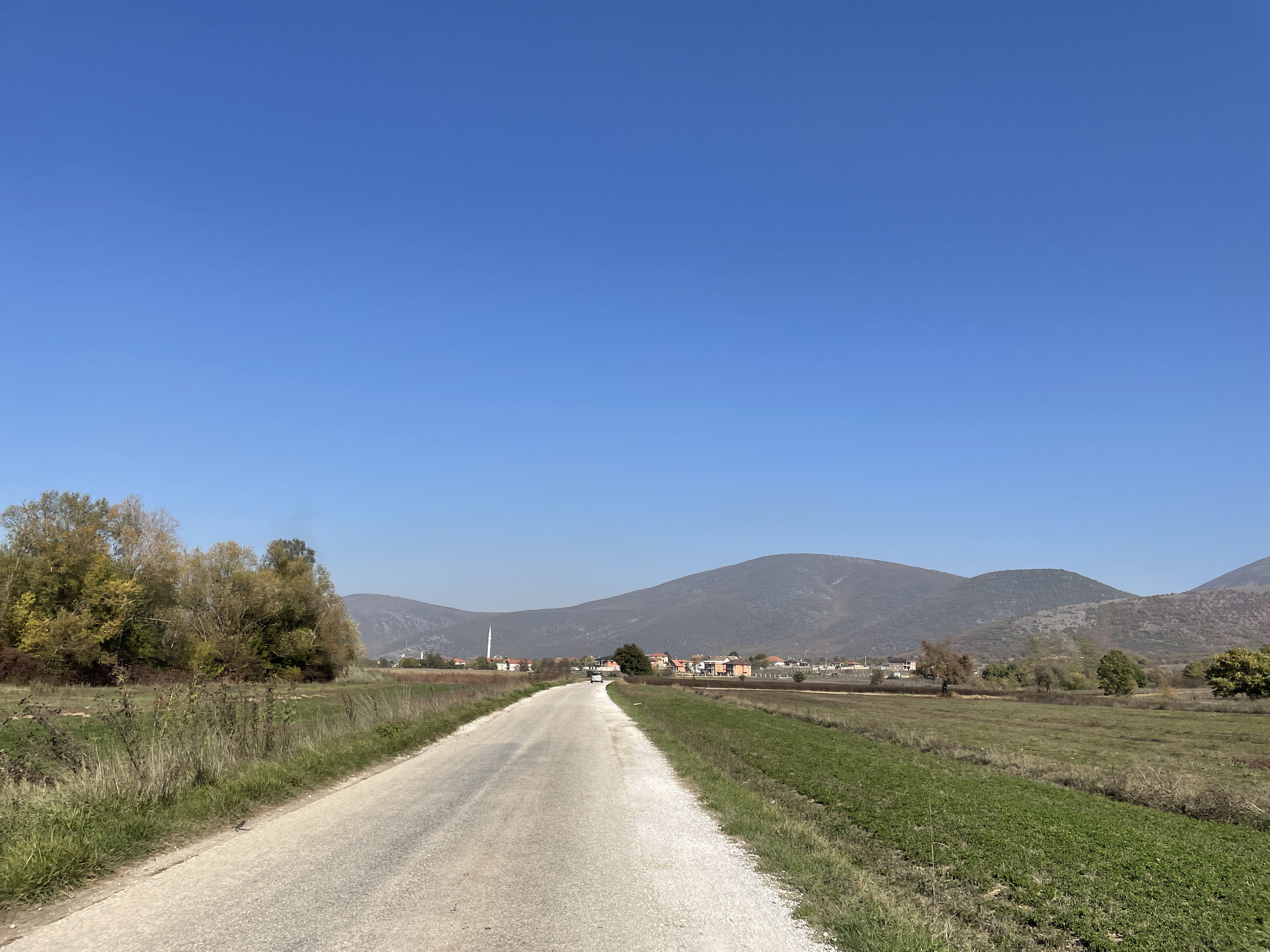
- View of the village

- Location within North Macedonia
- Coordinates: 42°03′N 21°08′E
- Country: North Macedonia
- Region: Polog
- Municipality: Jegunovce

Population (2021)
  - Total: 844
- Time zone: UTC+1 (CET)
  - Summer (DST): UTC+2 (CEST)
- Car plates: TE
- Website: .

Kopance (Macedonian: Копанце, Albanian: Kopancë) is a village in the municipality of Jegunovce, North Macedonia.

== Demographics ==
Kopance is attested in the 1467/68 Ottoman tax registry (defter) for the Nahiyah of Kalkandelen. The village had a total of 99 Christian households, 6 bachelors and 7 widows.

As of the 2021 census, Kopance had 844 residents with the following ethnic composition:

- Albanians 548
- Macedonians 196
- Persons for whom data are taken from administrative sources 100

According to the 2002 census, the village had a total of 1,059 inhabitants. Ethnic groups in the village include:

- Albanians 752
- Macedonians 300
- Serbs 4
- Others 3

In statistics gathered by Vasil Kanchov in 1900, the village of Kopance (Kopanica) was inhabited by 100 Christian Bulgarians and 70 Muslim Albanians.
