= 2001–02 Macedonian First Football League =

Macedonian First League
- Season: 2001–02
- Dates: 12 August 2001 – 29 May 2002
- Champions: Vardar; 4th Macedonian title 5th domestic title
- Relegated: Makedonija G.P. Osogovo
- Champions League: Vardar
- UEFA Cup: Belasica; Pobeda
- Intertoto Cup: Cementarnica
- Matches played: 192
- Goals scored: 561 (2.92 per match)
- Top goalscorer: Miroslav Gjokić (22 goals)
- Biggest home win: Sileks 7–1 Napredok (19 August 2001); Sloga J. 7–1 Kumanovo (7 November 2001); Cementarnica 6–0 Kumanovo (2 December 2001)
- Biggest away win: Sileks 0–7 Rabotnichki (3 March 2002)
- Highest scoring: Pobeda 7–3 Cementarnica (29 May 2002)

The 2001–02 Macedonian First League was the 10th season of the Macedonian First Football League, the highest football league of Macedonia. The first matches of the season were played on 12 August 2001 and the last on 29 May 2002. Sloga Jugomagnat were the defending champions, having won their third title in a row. The 2001–02 champions were Vardar who had won their fourth title, first since 1995. That was the first season in which the league consisted of 12 teams and only season (until the 2014–15 season) which contained the league play-off/play-out system.

== Promotion and relegation ==
At the start of the 2001–02 season

Promoted from 2000–01 Second League

- Kumanovo (winners)
- Napredok (runners-up)

Relegated to 2001–02 Second League

- Sasa (11th)
- Shkëndija HB (12th)
- Borec MHK (13th)
- Tikvesh (14th)

At the end of the 2001–02 season

Promoted from 2001–02 Second League

- Tikvesh (winners)
- Bregalnica Delchevo (runners-up)

Relegated to 2002–03 Second League

- Makedonija G.P. (11th)
- Osogovo (12th)

== Participating teams ==
Location of teams in 2001–02 Macedonian First League

Club	City	Stadium
Belasica Geras Cunev	Strumica	Stadion Mladost
Cementarnica 55	Skopje	Stadion Cementarnica
Kumanovo	Kumanovo	Gradski stadion Kumanovo
Makedonija G.P.	Skopje	Stadion Gjorche Petrov
Napredok	Kichevo	Gradski stadion Kichevo
Osogovo	Kochani	Stadion Nikola Mantov
Pelister	Bitola	Stadion Tumbe Kafe
Pobeda	Prilep	Stadion Goce Delchev
Rabotnichki Kometal	Skopje	Gradski stadion Skopje
Sileks	Kratovo	Stadion Sileks
Sloga Jugomagnat	Skopje	Chair Stadium
Vardar	Skopje	Gradski stadion Skopje

== Regular season ==
The first 22 Rounds comprise the first phase of the season, also called the Regular season. In the first phase, every team plays against every other team twice on a home-away basis. The table standings at the end of the Regular season determine the group in which each team is going to play in the Play-offs.

=== League table ===
Pos	Team	Pld	W	D	L	GF	GA	GD	Pts	Qualification
1	Pobeda	22	14	2	6	41	23	+18	44	Qualification for the championship round
2	Belasica	22	14	2	6	36	19	+17	44	Qualification for the championship round
3	Vardar	22	13	2	7	29	18	+11	41	Qualification for the championship round
4	Rabotnichki	22	12	3	7	40	25	+15	39	Qualification for the championship round
5	Cementarnica 55	22	10	5	7	32	19	+13	35	Qualification for the championship round
6	Sloga Jugomagnat	22	9	8	5	32	22	+10	35	Qualification for the championship round
7	Sileks	22	10	3	9	44	35	+9	33	Qualification for the relegation round
8	Kumanovo	22	10	2	10	27	42	−15	32	Qualification for the relegation round
9	Napredok	22	7	3	12	17	33	−16	24	Qualification for the relegation round
10	Pelister	22	5	4	13	24	40	−16	19	Qualification for the relegation round
11	Osogovo	22	5	1	16	18	40	−22	16	Qualification for the relegation round
12	Makedonija GP	22	4	3	15	14	38	−24	15	Qualification for the relegation round

Source: MacedonianFootball.com, RSSSF.org
Rules for classification: 1) Points; 2) Goal difference; 3) Goals scored; 4) Head-to-head points; 5) Head-to-head goal difference; 6) Head-to-head away goals scored (only if two teams); 7) Head-to-head goals scored; 8) Draw; 9) Play-off. (Note: Criteria 2, 3 and 8 is only used if not deciding teams for championship or relegation round).

=== Results ===
Home \ Away	BEL	CEM	KUM	MGP	NAP	OSO	PEL	POB	RAB	SIL	SLO	VAR
Belasica	—	2–1	3–0	2–0	1–0	5–0	3–0	2–0	2–1	2–1	0–1	1–0
Cementarnica 55	2–2	—	6–0	3–0	0–0	2–0	3–0	2–0	3–1	1–0	1–2	1–0
Kumanovo	3–1	2–1	—	1–0	0–2	1–0	2–0	2–1	2–0	2–4	0–0	2–1
Makedonija	0–3	1–1	1–0	—	1–2	3–0	1–0	0–2	0–0	2–4	0–0	1–0
Napredok	0–2	2–0	2–1	2–1	—	1–0	3–1	1–3	0–0	1–2	0–0	0–1
Osogovo	1–2	0–0	3–4	2–0	3–0	—	3–1	3–4	0–1	1–0	2–0	0–1
Pelister	1–0	2–0	0–1	3–1	2–0	3–0	—	3–3	0–1	2–2	0–0	1–2
Pobeda	2–0	2–0	2–0	4–2	1–0	2–0	5–0	—	3–1	1–0	0–0	1–0
Rabotnichki	2–3	0–1	4–0	1–0	1–0	4–0	2–1	3–2	—	2–1	4–2	2–3
Sileks	1–0	1–1	2–2	1–0	7–1	4–0	3–0	1–2	0–7	—	6–2	2–1
Sloga Jugomagnat	0–0	0–2	7–1	4–0	4–0	1–0	3–2	2–1	1–1	3–1	—	0–0
Vardar	3–0	2–1	2–1	3–0	2–0	1–0	2–2	1–0	1–2	2–1	1–0	—

Source: RSSSF.org
Legend: Blue = home team win; Yellow = draw; Red = away team win.

== Second phase ==
The second phase are the so-called Play-off Rounds which is divided in two groups: Championship and Relegation. The top 6 ranked teams on the table after the Regular Season qualify for the Championship group, while the bottom 6 advance to the Relegation group. The teams will keep only the head-to-head records with the teams which he entered.

=== Championship group ===
==== Table ====
Pos	Team	Pld	W	D	L	GF	GA	GD	Pts	Qualification
1	Vardar (C)	20	11	4	5	28	16	+12	37	Qualification for the Champions League first qualifying round
2	Belasica	20	11	3	6	29	22	+7	36	Qualification for the UEFA Cup qualifying round
3	Cementarnica 55	20	8	3	9	33	34	−1	27	Qualification for the Intertoto Cup first round
4	Pobeda	20	7	4	9	28	28	0	25	Qualification for the UEFA Cup qualifying round (Note: Pobeda qualified for the UEFA Cup qualifying round by winning the 2001–02 Macedonian Football Cup.)
5	Sloga Jugomagnat	20	6	5	9	18	25	−7	23	
6	Rabotnichki	20	6	3	11	30	41	−11	21	

Source: MacedonianFootball.com, RSSSF.org
Rules for classification: 1) Points; 2) Goal difference; 3) Goals scored; 4) Head-to-head points; 5) Head-to-head goal difference; 6) Head-to-head away goals scored (only if two teams); 7) Head-to-head goals scored; 8) Draw; 9) Play-off. (Note: Criteria 2, 3 and 8 is only used if not deciding Champion or teams for UEFA competitions).
(C) Champions

==== Results ====
Home \ Away	BEL	CEM	POB	RAB	SLO	VAR
Belasica	—	5–0	1–0	2–0	2–1	1–0
Cementarnica 55	3–1	—	1–1	5–0	3–1	0–0
Pobeda	3–2	7–3	—	3–1	0–0	1–2
Rabotnichki	2–0	2–1	2–2	—	3–1	2–2
Sloga Jugomagnat	0–2	3–1	3–0	1–0	—	0–2
Vardar	1–1	3–2	2–0	3–1	2–0	—

Source: RSSSF.org
Legend: Blue = home team win; Yellow = draw; Red = away team win.

=== Relegation group ===
==== Table ====
Pos	Team	Pld	W	D	L	GF	GA	GD	Pts	Relegation
7	Sileks	20	11	2	7	48	35	+13	35	
8	Napredok	20	11	2	7	34	33	+1	35	
9	Kumanovo	20	10	2	8	35	36	−1	32	
10	Pelister	20	8	3	9	37	35	+2	27	
11	Makedonija G.P. (R)	20	7	3	10	29	28	+1	24	Relegation to the Macedonian Second League
12	Osogovo (R)	20	5	4	11	22	38	−16	19	Relegation to the Macedonian Second League

Source: MacedonianFootball.com, RSSSF.org
Rules for classification: 1) Points; 2) Goal difference; 3) Goals scored; 4) Head-to-head points; 5) Head-to-head goal difference; 6) Head-to-head away goals scored (only if two teams); 7) Head-to-head goals scored; 8) Draw; 9) Play-off. (Note: Criteria 2, 3 and 8 is only used if not deciding teams for relegation).
(R) Relegated

==== Results ====
Home \ Away	KUM	MGP	NAP	OSO	PEL	SIL
Kumanovo	—	2–1	3–1	1–1	5–3	3–1
Makedonija	4–1	—	0–0	0–0	1–2	4–1
Napredok	3–0	2–1	—	4–1	2–0	2–1
Osogovo	1–2	0–2	1–1	—	1–1	3–2
Pelister	3–2	3–3	5–3	5–0	—	3–1
Sileks	4–2	2–3	3–2	3–2	1–0	—

Source: RSSSF.org
Legend: Blue = home team win; Yellow = draw; Red = away team win.

== Top goalscorers ==
Rank	Player	Club	Goals
1	(North Macedonia) Miroslav Gjokić	Pobeda	22
2	(North Macedonia) Vancho Micevski	Pelister	19
3	(North Macedonia) Argjend Beqiri	Sloga Jugomagnat	15

== See also ==
- 2001–02 Macedonian Football Cup
- 2001–02 Macedonian Second Football League
