= 2000–01 Macedonian Second Football League =

Macedonian Second League
- Season: 2000–01
- Champions: Kumanovo
- Promoted: Kumanovo; Napredok
- Relegated: Mladost GT; Vardar Negotino; Mesna Industrija; Malesh

The 2000–01 Macedonian Second Football League was the ninth season since its establishment. It began on 19 August 2000 and ended in May 2001.

== Participating teams ==
Location of teams in 2000–01 Macedonian Second League

Club	City
11 Oktomvri	Prilep
Alumina	Skopje
Bashkimi	Kumanovo
Bregalnica	Delchevo
Jaka	Radovish
Jugohrom	Jegunovce
Karaorman	Struga
Kumanovo	Kumanovo
Malesh	Berovo
Mesna Industrija	Sveti Nikole
Mladost GT	Orizari
Napredok	Kichevo
Novaci	Novaci
Ohrid	Ohrid
Sloga	Vinica
Shkëndija	Arachinovo
Teteks	Tetovo
Vardar	Negotino

== League standing ==
Pos	Team	Pld	W	D	L	GF	GA	GD	Pts	Promotion or relegation
1	Kumanovo (C, P)	34	23	8	3	79	27	+52	77	Promotion to Macedonian First League
2	Napredok (P)	34	23	3	8	74	43	+31	72	Promotion to Macedonian First League
3	Jugohrom	34	21	4	9	68	39	+29	67	
4	Sloga Vinica (Note: Sloga Vinica was deducted 3 points.)	34	19	5	10	66	32	+34	59	
5	Karaorman	34	17	4	13	65	43	+22	55	
6	Shkëndija Arachinovo	34	17	4	13	60	54	+6	55	
7	Alumina	34	16	6	12	64	49	+15	54	
8	Ohrid	34	16	5	13	55	51	+4	53	
9	Novaci	34	16	4	14	56	43	+13	52	
10	Teteks	34	15	6	13	56	40	+16	51	
11	Jaka Radovish	34	13	10	11	53	51	+2	49	
12	Bashkimi	34	15	3	16	64	51	+13	48	
13	Bregalnica Delchevo	34	13	4	17	50	49	+1	43	
14	11 Oktomvri	34	12	7	15	59	69	−10	43	
15	Mladost GT Orizari (R)	34	10	4	20	52	82	−30	34	Relegation to Macedonian Third League
16	Vardar Negotino (R)	34	7	2	25	35	107	−72	23	Relegation to Macedonian Third League
17	Mesna Industrija (R)	34	4	6	24	32	89	−57	18	Relegation to Macedonian Third League
18	Malesh (R)	34	5	3	26	29	98	−69	18	Relegation to Macedonian Third League

Source: MacedonianFootball.com, RSSSF.org
Rules for classification: 1) Points; 2) Head-to-head points; 3) Head-to-head goal difference; 4) Head-to-head away goals scored
(C) Champions; (P) Promoted; (R) Relegated

== Results ==
Home \ Away	OKT	ALU	BAS	BRD	JAK	JUG	KAR	KUM	MAL	MES	MLA	NAP	NOV	OHR	SKA	SLV	TET	VRN
11 Oktomvri	—	1–1		3–1	3–3			1–3			3–1	2–1	5–2	1–1	1–0		1–1	3–1
Alumina	2–1	—	2–0	2–0	3–2		1–0	2–1		1–1		2–0	1–1		1–2	3–1	1–1	5–2
Bashkimi	4–1	0–1	—		4–1	3–0	2–1	1–2	1–1		4–1	2–3	1–0	5–0		2–1		
Bregalnica Delchevo		1–0	1–2	—		1–2	4–2	2–0	3–0	1–1	1–1	0–1	0–0		1–0	0–1		3–1
Jaka Radovish	2–0	2–1	3–1	1–0	—			1–1		1–1	3–0 (Note: Match awarded after a disqualification of Mladost GT.)	0–0	1–0	4–0	0–3		2–3	4–2
Jugohrom	2–0	1–0	2–1		2–1	—	3–0	0–1	3–1	4–0				5–0	2–0		1–0	4–0
Karaorman	3–2	5–1		2–0	3–0	3–1	—	0–4	1–0		3–0 (Note: Match awarded because a Mladost GT did not show up at the match.)	3–0		2–1	3–0		3–0	
Kumanovo	3–0		2–0			1–1	4–0	—	6–0	1–1	4–2	5–1	3–1		1–1	3–2	1–1	2–0
Malesh	0–1	0–2		0–2	1–1	1–3	0–1	0–3	—	1–0	3–2			0–2	3–2		2–0	5–1
Mesna Industrija	2–1		2–0	1–1	1–3	1–3	0–0		1–1	—			0–2	0–3		1–2	0–1	6–0
Mladost GT	6–1	2–1	1–0	2–1	1–1	1–3	1–1		4–0	3–1	—		0–3	1–2	4–0	0–3	2–1	3–2
Napredok	2–0			4–1	2–1	4–1	2–1		3–0	1–0	1–0	—	3–2	3–0			2–0	10–0
Novaci	1–0		2–1		1–0	1–0	1–0		2–0	4–1	3–1	1–2	—			1–2	2–1	5–0
Ohrid	1–1	4–1	2–1	3–2	1–1		1–3	0–0		2–0	3–0		0–1	—	1–0	3–2		2–1
Shkëndija Arachinovo	2–1		3–1	2–1		4–1	3–3	2–1		5–0	5–1	4–0	2–1		—	2–0		1–2
Sloga Vinica	3–2	3–0	1–0		1–1	0–3	2–1		5–0	3–0	4–0	0–0	4–0	0–0		—	2–1	
Teteks		1–1	2–0	3–2	3–2			0–2		2–1	2–0	1–3	4–1	3–0	4–0	2–0	—	5–0
Vardar Negotino		0–4	0–0			3–2	0–3	0–3	4–2		3–2	1–0	1–0	0–4	1–2	1–1		—

Source: RSSSF.org (Rounds 1-25 and last round)
Legend: Blue = home team win; Yellow = draw; Red = away team win.

== See also ==
- 2000–01 Macedonian Football Cup
- 2000–01 Macedonian First Football League
