= Zlatko Todorovski =

Macedonian footballer (born 1972)

Personal information
- Date of birth: 30 April 1972 (age 54)
- Place of birth: SFR Yugoslavia
- Height: 1.94 m (6 ft 4 in)
- Position: Midfielder

Senior career*
Years	Team	Apps	(Gls)
1996–1999	Vardar		
1999	VfB Leipzig		
2000	OFK Beograd	9	(1)
2000–2001	Rabotnički	17	(1)
2001	Vardar	2	(0)
2002	Makedonija G.P.	5	(0)

International career
1998	Macedonia	2	(0)
- * Club domestic league appearances and goals

Zlatko Todorovski (Macedonian: Злaткo Toдopoвcки, born 30 April 1972) is a Macedonian former professional footballer who played as a midfielder. He made two appearances for the Macedonia national team.

== Club career ==
Playing as midfielder, Todorovski played with FK Vardar, FK Rabotnički and FK Makedonija Gjorče Petrov in the Macedonian First League. In June 1999 he left Vardar and signed with German side VfB Leipzig, but during the winter break he moved to Serbian side OFK Beograd and played with them the second half of the 1999–2000 First League of FR Yugoslavia.

== International career ==
Todorovski made his senior debut for Macedonia in a June 1998 friendly match against Bosnia and Herzegovina and has earned a total of two caps. His second and final international was a September 1998 friendly against Egypt.

== Honours ==
Vardar

- Macedonian First League: 2001–02
- Macedonian Cup: 1997–98, 1998–99
