= FK Makedonija Vraništa =

Makedonija Vranishta
- Full name: Fudbalski klub Makedonija Vranishta
- Founded: 1941; 85 years ago
- Ground: Stadion Sime Stojanoski
- Chairman: Naumche Spaseski
- Manager: Daniel Maceski
- League: OFS Struga
- 2023–24: 6th

FK Makedonija Vranishta (Macedonian: ФК Македонија Враништа) is a football club based in the village of Vranishta near Struga, North Macedonia. They currently competing in the OFS Struga league.

== History ==
The club was founded in 1975.

Their biggest success was the playing in the Macedonian Second League in 2001–02 season.
