= Dančo Masev =

Macedonian footballer

Personal information
- Full name: Dančo Masev
- Date of birth: 16 December 1983 (age 42)
- Place of birth: Strumica, SFR Yugoslavia
- Height: 1.84 m (6 ft 1/2 in)
- Position: Midfielder

Senior career*
Years	Team	Apps	(Gls)
2000–2003	Belasica	74	(3)
2004	Rad		
2004–2005	Vardar	40	(6)
2006–2007	Metalurh Zaporizhzhia	8	(0)
2007–2009	Rabotnički	24	(0)
2008	→ Vardar (loan)	15	(0)
2009–2010	Horizont Turnovo	18	(1)
2010–2011	Anagennisi Karditsa	1	(0)
2011–2012	Belasica	26	(1)

International career
2002–2005	Macedonia	5	(0)
- * Club domestic league appearances and goals

Dančo Masev (Macedonian: Данчо Масев; born 16 December 1983) is a Macedonian retired footballer.

== Club career ==
He plays in midfield and he played for Anagennisi Karditsa F.C., FK Belasica, FC Metalurh Zaporizhzhia in Ukraine, FK Rad in Serbia and with FK Rabotnički and FK Vardar in Macedonia.

== International career ==
He made his debut for the Macedonian national team on 20 November 2002 in a friendly match against Israel, and has earned a total of 5 caps, scoring no goals. His final international was a November 2005 friendly match against Liechtenstein.
