= Zoran Baldovaliev =

Macedonian footballer

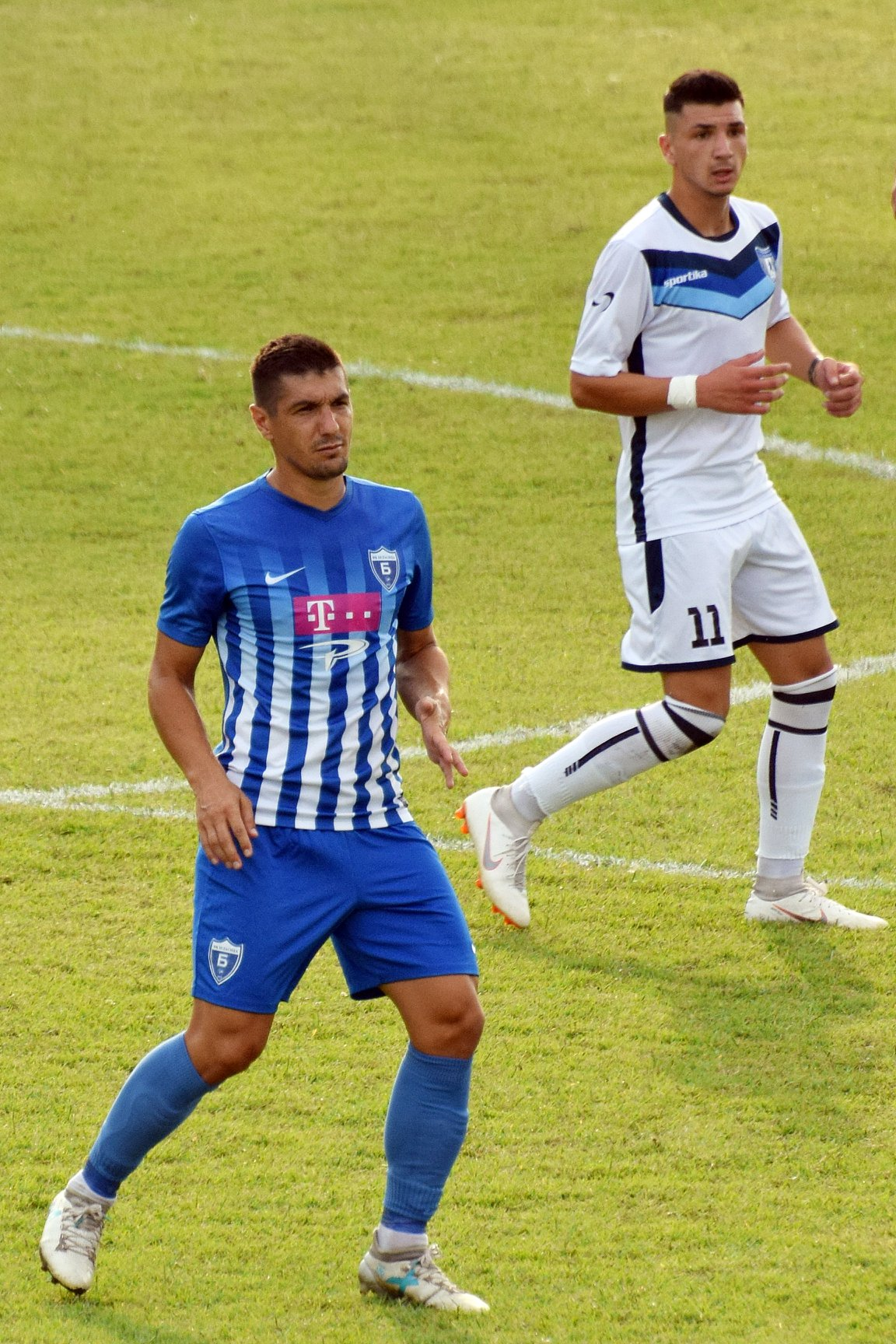

Personal information
- Full name: Zoran Baldovaliev
- Date of birth: 4 March 1983 (age 43)
- Place of birth: Strumica, Socialist Republic of Macedonia
- Height: 1.84 m (6 ft 0 in)
- Position: Forward

Team information
- Current team: Tikvesh
- Number: 26

Youth career
- 1993–2001: Belasica

Senior career*
| Years | Team | Apps | (Gls) |
| 2001–2003 | Belasica | 53 | (29) |
| 2003–2005 | Publikum Celje | 26 | (4) |
| 2005 | Turnovo | 5 | (2) |
| 2005–2006 | MKT Araz Imisli | 16 | (4) |
| 2006 | Ventspils | 5 | (0) |
| 2007 | Lokomotiv Plovdiv | 12 | (11) |
| 2007–2009 | Lokomotiv Sofia | 64 | (23) |
| 2010–2011 | Ironi Kiryat Shmona | 26 | (8) |
| 2011 | Enosis Neon Paralimni | 10 | (2) |
| 2011–2012 | Najran | 13 | (2) |
| 2012 | Al-Qadisiyah | 7 | (0) |
| 2012–2013 | Turnovo | 30 | (21) |
| 2013–2014 | Kerkyra | 36 | (14) |
| 2014–2015 | Chiasso | 14 | (1) |
| 2015 | Olympiacos Volos | 16 | (3) |
| 2015 | Lokomotiv Plovdiv | 18 | (5) |
| 2015–2016 | Kerkyra | 10 | (1) |
| 2016–2018 | Akademija Pandev | 53 | (34) |
| 2018–2019 | Belasica | 30 | (5) |
| 2019 | Giouchtas | | |
| 2020– | Tikvesh | 2 | (1) |

International career
| 2003-2007 | Macedonia | 4 | (1) |
- * Club domestic league appearances and goals as of 14:08, 28 July 2020 (UTC)

Zoran Baldovaliev (Macedonian: Зоран Балдовалиев; born 4 March 1983) is a Macedonian footballer who plays as a forward for Tikvesh Kavadarci.

== Club career ==
Baldovaliev started his career in the Macedonian club Belasica, and played for the Macedonia (now North Macedonia) between 2002 and 2003. He subsequently played for the Slovenian club Publikum from January 2004 until March 2005, and after that came back in Macedonia to play for Horizont Turnovo for three months. After that he played for the Azerbaijanian club MKT Araz Imisli between 2003 and 2005, and for the Latvian champion Ventspils for six months in 2006.

In June 2007 he signed with the Bulgarian club Lokomotiv Sofia.

In 2010, Baldovaliev was bought by Israeli side Hapoel Ironi Kiryat Shmona, which he helped obtain a spot in the first tier of Israeli football after in his first season there. He joined Cypriot club Enosis on 30 January 2011, but was released after the end of the season.

On 5 September 2011, he joined Saudi Professional League side Najran on a one-year plus an option year contract. In early January, he was released by Najran and moved to another Saudi Arabian team Al-Qadisiyah.

On 16 September 2012, Zoran made his debut for Turnovo, scoring a goal in his first game. He has since had a promising start for the club with his experience. He scored 16 goals for Horizont Turnovo, in the season, 2012/13. He played in August 2013 the first two games for Horizont and scored 5 goals.

Baldovaliev rejoined his former club Lokomotiv Plovdiv in the summer of 2015.

In summer 2016, Baldovaliev joined of Akademia Pandev and he scored 20 goals in season, 2016/17, and Akademia Pandev was champion in the Macedonian Second League. In next season, 2017/18, Baldovaliev scored 14 goals and he was third goalscorer in the Macedonian First League. On the summer 2018, he signed for Belasica. He scored 5 goals for Belasica in the season, 2018/19. After a half year at Greece club Giouchtas, Baldovaliev returned to North Macedonia and signed with Tikvesh on 8 January 2020.

== International career ==
He made his senior debut for Macedonia in a February 2003 friendly match away against Croatia and has earned a total of 4 caps, scoring 1 goal. His final international was an August 2007 friendly match against Liechtenstein.
