= Vranište, Struga =

Vraništa Враништа
- Village
- Vraništa
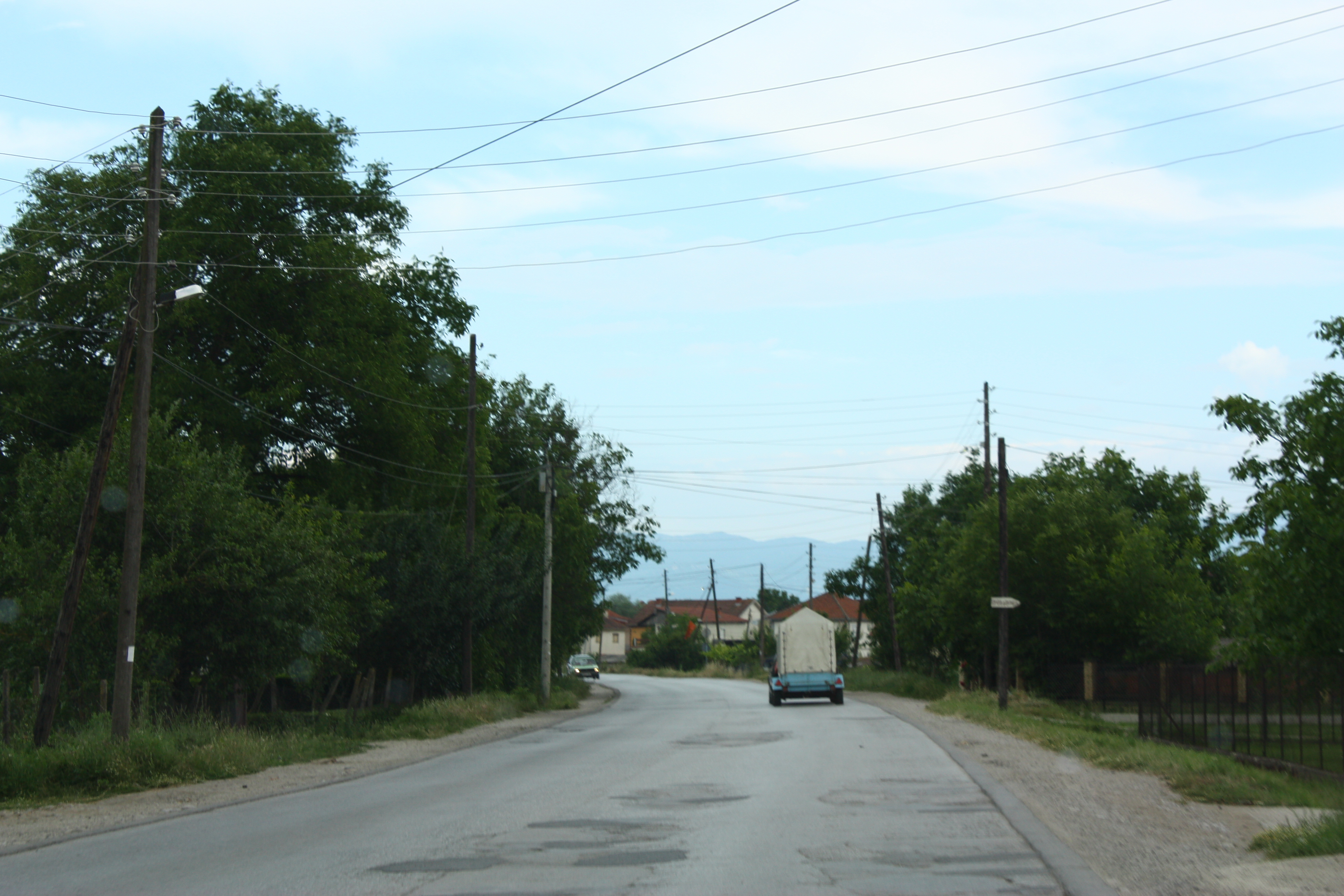

- Location within North Macedonia
- Country: North Macedonia
- Region: Southwestern
- Municipality: Struga
- Elevation: 684 m (2,244 ft)

Population (2021)
  - Total: ≥2,000
- Time zone: UTC+1 (CET)
- Area code: +38946

Vraništa (Macedonian: Враништа) is a village in Municipality of Struga, North Macedonia.

== Demographics ==
As of the 2021 census, Vraništa had ≥2,000 residents all of them being Macedonianswith the following ethnic composition:

- Macedonians 1,471
- Persons for whom data are taken from administrative sources 76
- Albanians 8
- Others 8

According to the 2002 census, the village had a total of 1,517 inhabitants. Ethnic groups in the village include:

- Macedonians 1,506
- Vlachs 4
- Serbs 4
- Other 3

== Sports ==
Local football club FK Makedonija Vraništa play in the Macedonian Third League (Southwest Division).
