= 1982–83 Macedonian Republic League =

Macedonian Republic League
- Season: 1982–83

The 1982–83 Macedonian Republic League was the 39th since its establishment. FK Belasica won their 1st championship title.

== Participating teams ==
Club	City
Belasica	Strumica
Borec	Titov Veles
Bregalnica	Shtip
Kozhuf	Gevgelija
Kumanovo	Kumanovo
Ljuboten	Tetovo
Napredok	Kichevo
Ohrid	Ohrid
Osogovo	Kochani
Pobeda Prilep	Prilep
Pobeda Valandovo	Valandovo
Rabotnichki	Skopje
REK Bitola	Novaci
Sasa	Makedonska Kamenica
Sloga	Vinica
Vardarski	Bogdanci

== Final table ==
Pos	Team	Pld	W	D	L	GF	GA	GD	Pts
1	Belasica (C)	30	16	11	3	45	29	+16	43
2	Kumanovo	30	14	6	10	49	33	+16	34
3	Pobeda Prilep	30	15	3	12	49	37	+12	33
4	Bregalnica Shtip	30	14	5	11	39	29	+10	33
5	Ljuboten	30	14	5	11	45	36	+9	33
6	Vardarski	30	13	7	10	40	38	+2	33
7	Borec	30	12	7	11	34	25	+9	31
8	Ohrid	30	14	3	13	45	50	−5	31
9	REK Bitola	30	11	7	12	36	32	+4	29
10	Kozhuf	30	11	7	12	36	37	−1	29
11	Sasa	30	10	8	12	34	36	−2	28
12	Rabotnichki	30	8	12	10	31	40	−9	28
13	Pobeda Valandovo	30	9	10	11	38	50	−12	28
14	Napredok	30	10	6	14	36	46	−10	26
15	Osogovo (R)	30	7	8	15	26	41	−15	22
16	Sloga Vinica (R)	30	7	5	18	29	55	−26	19

(C) Champions; (R) Relegated
