= FK Belasica =

ФК Беласица FK Belasica
- Full name: Fudbalski klub Belasica Strumica / Фудбалски клуб Беласица Струмица
- Nickname: Кенгури (Kangaroos)
- Short name: Belasica, BEL
- Founded: 13 August 1922; 104 years ago
- Ground: Blagoj Istatov Stadium
- Capacity: 9,200
- Chairman: Slavcho Vaskov-Pinda
- Manager: Rade Cicmilovic
- League: Macedonian Second League
- 2025–26: 5th
- Website: https://fkbelasica.com.mk/
Home colours	Away colours

FK Belasica (Macedonian: ФК Беласица) is a professional football club based in the city of Strumica, North Macedonia. They are currently competing in the Macedonian Second League.

== History ==
The club was founded on 22 April 1922 at the cafe of Tašo Todorov, where fifty initiators gathered at the founding meeting for the football club Belasica Strumica. According to documents, the first meeting was held on 13 August 1922 with Gjorgi Moskov elected president, Tomi Kujundziev as secretary and Rosto Perov as treasurer. The first match played in club history was against Pobeda from Skopje, where Belasica lost by the score of 1–0.

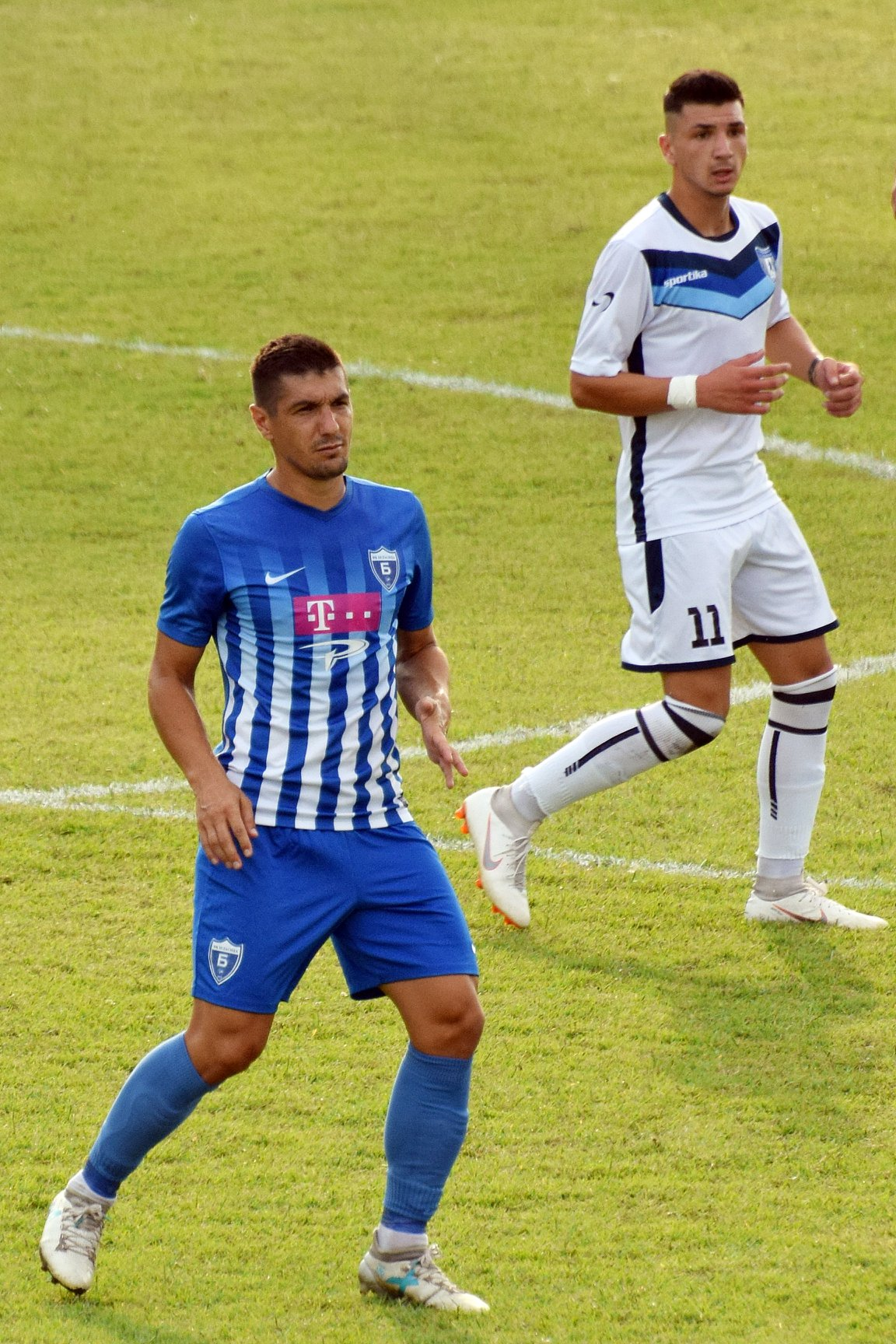
Baldovaliev Belasica legendary Stricker 52 games 29 goals

Their popular nickname is Kangaroos and their best period was the golden 80s when they won the Macedonian Republic championship twice. At the time, the club mostly played in the Federal Second league with teams from the six federal republics. Everybody in Macedonia remembers old legends from the club such as Blagoj Istatov and Vasil Ringov. Belasica was also known as Belasica GC, as Geras Cunev was the main sponsor. In the Macedonian top league, they had their biggest success under the leadership of Vančo Takovski in the early 2000s when they were runners-up of the Macedonian First League twice. Over the years, Belasica has played an important role by providing countless source of football talent. The North Macedonia national football team had many players that came from the Belasica youth system. Among them are: Goran Pandev, Aco Stojkov, Dragan Stojkov, Igor Gjuzelov, Robert Popov, Goran Popov, Zoran Baldovaliev, Dančo Masev and Goran Maznov.

In 2015, the club was bought by the Macedonian kickboxer Slavcho Vaskov-Pinda.

The most notable player to come out of Belasica is Goran Pandev a retired Macedonian international and all-time leading goal scorer for the national team.

Belasica's old logo

== Honours ==
- (Socialist Republic of Macedonia) Macedonian Republic League
  - Winners (4):1956,1958, 1983, 1988
- (Socialist Republic of Macedonia) Macedonian Republic Cup
  - Winners (2): 1983–84, 1985–86
- (North Macedonia) Macedonian First League
  - Runners-up (2): 2001–02, 2002–03
- (North Macedonia) Macedonian Second League
  - Winners (3): 1999–2000, 2017–18, 2019–20

== Stadium ==
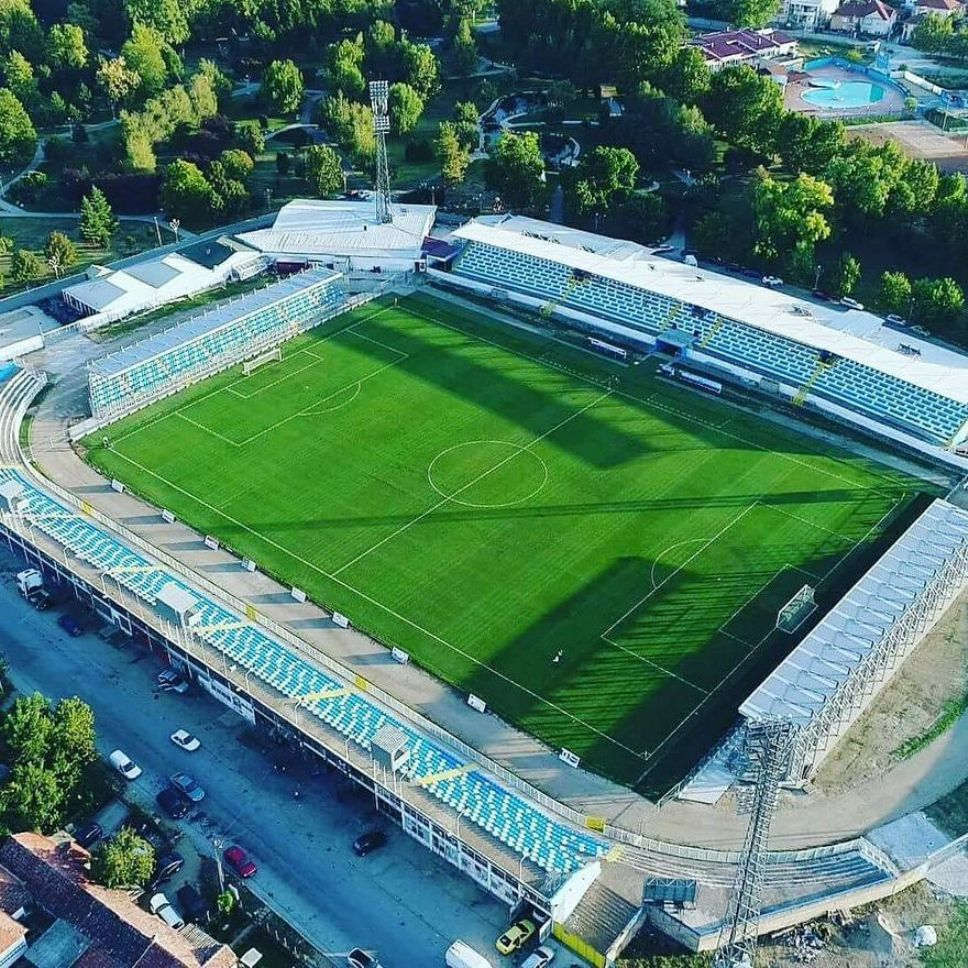

Mladost Stadium is a multi-purpose stadium in Strumica, Republic of North Macedonia. It is currently used mostly for football matches and the stadium's capacity is 6,500 spectators. With the last reconstruction in 2017 the stadium has a capacity of 9,200 seats, and it is a third-class field in accordance with UEFA standards. It meets the conditions for a high-ranking competition and is the second such stadium in the country. Stadium change the name in 2019 from "Mladost" to "Blagoj Istatov".

== Supporters ==
The supporters of fk Belasica are called "Ajduci" and they were founded in 1988.

== Recent seasons ==
Season	League									Cup	European competitions		Top goalscorer	
Season	Division	P	W	D	L	F	A	Pts	Pos	Cup	European competitions		Player	Goals
1992–93	1. MFL	34	12	10	12	41	44	34	9th				Toni Eftimov	10
1993–94	1. MFL	30	7	12	11	35	48	26	12th	R1			Derviš Hadžiosmanović	10
1994–95	1. MFL	30	11	4	15	48	62	37	10th				Vasko Georgiev	15
1995–96	1. MFL	28	9	6	13	34	38	33	9th				J. Vasilev; Branko Belichev	6
1996–97	1. MFL	26	9	6	11	32	41	33	10th	GS			Mario Petkov	12
1997–98	1. MFL	25	8	4	13	25	35	41	13th ↓	QF			Vancho Atanasov	12
1998–99	2. MFL East	29	19	2	8	58	30	59	2nd				Vasko Georgiev	15
1999–00	2. MFL East	30	27	0	3	116	19	72	1st ↑	R1			Vancho Atanasov	23
2000–01	1. MFL	26	17	4	5	56	22	55	4th	QF			Ljubiša Nikolić	16
2001–02	1. MFL	20	11	3	6	29	22	36	2nd	R2			Ljubiša Nikolić	14
2002–03	1. MFL	33	20	9	4	50	32	69	2nd	SF	UEFA Cup	QR	Zoran Baldovaliev	21
2003–04	1. MFL	33	10	6	17	37	55	36	10th	R2	UEFA Cup	QR	Zoran Baldovaliev	9
2004–05	1. MFL	33	14	6	13	53	47	48	8th	R1			Aleksandar Stojanovski	26
2005–06	1. MFL	33	2	2	29	22	84	8	12th ↓	R2			Dušan Savić	7
2006–07	2. MFL	33	11	7	15	36	59	40	9th	R1			Gjoksen Limanov	11
2007–08	2. MFL	32	16	7	9	49	37	55	4th				Vasko Georgiev	10
2008–09	2. MFL	29	10	8	11	34	33	38	8th	R2			Aleksandar Stojanovski	8
2009–10	2. MFL	26	10	3	13	28	39	33	8th	R2			Gjorgji Markov	10
2010–11	2. MFL	26	13	4	9	39	26	43	5th	R1			Gjorgji Markov	11
2011–12	2. MFL	30	4	6	20	27	56	18	16th ↓				Vasko Georgiev	7
2012–13	3. MFL East	33	23	3	7	102	23	72	4th	R1				
2013–14	3. MFL East	26	23	1	2	82	16	70	1st	R1			Gjoksen Limanov	28
2014–15	3. MFL East	22	18	3	1	66	11	57	1st	R1			Mile Kostovski	27
2015–16	3. MFL East	22	12	2	8	49	27	38	3rd	R1			M. Atanasovski	14
2016–17	3. MFL East	27	24	1	2	126	14	73	1st ↑	R1			Boban Marikj	38
2017–18	2. MFL East	25	18	5	2	81	11	59	1st ↑	R1			Pepi Gorgiev	16
2018–19	1. MFL	36	9	11	16	37	49	38	9th ↓	SF			Pepi Gorgiev	9
2019–20^{1}	2. MFL East	16	13	1	2	36	9	40	1st ↑	N/A			Martin Mirchevski	14
2020–21	1. MFL	33	4	5	24	23	68	17	12th ↓	QF			Antonio Kalanoski	8
2021–22	2. MFL East	27	18	5	4	56	14	59	2nd	R2			Aleksandar Kocev	12
2022–23	2. MFL	30	10	5	15	36	47	35	10th	R1			Aleksandar Milushev	8
2023–24	2. MFL	30	11	9	10	39	32	42	7th	R1			Aleksandar Milushev	7
2024–25	2. MFL	30	10	11	9	35	30	41	8th	R1			Dimche Jovov	8
2025–26	2. MFL	30	18	4	8	57	21	58	5th	R2			Bojan Spirkoski	10

^{1}The 2019–20 season was abandoned due to the COVID-19 pandemic in Macedonia.

== Belasica in Europe ==
Season	Competition	Round	Club	Home	Away	Aggregate
2002–03	UEFA Cup	Qualifying round	(Portugal) Leixões	2–2	1–2	3–4
2003–04	UEFA Cup	Qualifying round	(Slovenia) NK Celje	2–7	0–5	2–12

== Players ==
=== Current squad ===
As of 15 September 2026.

Note: Flags indicate national team as defined under FIFA eligibility rules; some limited exceptions apply. Players may hold more than one non-FIFA nationality.

No.	Pos.	Nation	Player
1	GK	MKD	Spasko Ahtarov
2	DF	MKD	Filip Mitev
3	DF	MKD	Aleksandar Milushev
4	DF	MKD	Luka Varoshanoski
5	DF	MKD	David Stojkov
6	MF	MKD	Martin Sharenkovski
7	FW	MKD	Mario Kostov
8	MF	MKD	Stefan Sulev
9	FW	MKD	David Spasov
10	MF	MKD	Goran Tomovski
11	FW	MKD	Zhivko Krstev
13	MF	MKD	Petar Trendov

No.	Pos.	Nation	Player
15	FW	MKD	Emush Elmaz
17	MF	MKD	Blagoj Stojanov
18	FW	MKD	Mihail Tanchev
19	FW	MKD	Ron Memedi
20	DF	MKD	Gligor Donchev
22	MF	MKD	David Ivanovski
23	MF	MKD	Dimitrij Dimitrievski
24	DF	MKD	Gordan Alexander Damchevski
25	MF	MKD	Filip Mihailov
30	GK	MKD	Gjorgi Trajkov
—	MF	MKD	Apostol Mitrov

=== Youth players ===
Youth players that have been summoned in the first team during the current 2024-25 season.

Note: Flags indicate national team as defined under FIFA eligibility rules; some limited exceptions apply. Players may hold more than one non-FIFA nationality.

No.	Pos.	Nation	Player

== Historical list of coaches ==
- (North Macedonia) Blagoj Istatov (1983 - 1989)
- (North Macedonia) Risto Bozhinov (1989 - 1990)
- (North Macedonia) Blagoj Ashikov (1990 - 1991)
- (North Macedonia) Blagoj Istatov (1991 - 1992)
- (North Macedonia) Goce Petrovski (1992 - 1993)
- (North Macedonia) Ilija Andreev (1993 )
- (North Macedonia) Nikola Ilievski (1993 - 1994)
- (North Macedonia) Pance Pantaziev (1995 - 1996)
- (North Macedonia) Blagoj Istatov (1996 - 1997)
- (North Macedonia) Ratko Janushev (1997 - 1998)
- (North Macedonia) Blagoj Istatov (1998 - 1999)
- (North Macedonia) Risto Panov (1998 - 1999)
- (North Macedonia) Ilija Matenicarov (1999 - 2000)
- (North Macedonia) Nikola Ilievski (2000)
- (North Macedonia) Trajce Georgiev (2001)
- (North Macedonia) Nikola Sekulov (2001)
- (North Macedonia) Riste Ancev (16 Nov 2001 )
- (North Macedonia) Dragi Kanatlarovski (2002)
- (North Macedonia) Riste Ancev (16 2002 -)
- (North Macedonia) Pane Blazevski (9 Apr 2003 -)
- (Serbia) Miroslav Jakovljević (2004 - Sep 2005)
- (North Macedonia) Šefki Arifovski (30 Sep 2005 - Dec 2005)
- (Bulgaria) Zvonko Todorov (15 Dec 2005 - 2006)
- (North Macedonia) Jugoslav Trencovski (15 Sep 2007 - 15 Jul 2009)
- (North Macedonia) Milko Ǵurovski (15 Jul 2009 - 4 Jan 2010)
- (North Macedonia) Gordan Zdravkov (2010 - 2011)
- (North Macedonia) Aco Stojanov (2011 - )
- (North Macedonia) Shefki Arifovski (2012 -)
- (North Macedonia) Toni Eftimov (2012 - 2014)
- (North Macedonia) Stefan Petkovski (Mar 2015 - Jul 2015)
- (North Macedonia) Aco Stojanov (2015 - 2016)
- (North Macedonia) Rade Cicmilovikj (1 Aug 2016 - 30 Jul 2018)
- (North Macedonia) Vasko Georgiev (2016 - 2017)
- (Serbia) Marjan Živković (31 Jul 2018 - 3 Dec 2018)
- (North Macedonia) Rade Cicmilovikj (4 Dec 2018 - 22 Mar 2019)
- (North Macedonia) Gjoko Hadžievski (23 Mar 2019 - 15 Apr 2019)
- (North Macedonia) Aleksandar Stojanov (18 Apr 2019 -)
- (North Macedonia) Vane Milkov (2019 -2020)
- (North Macedonia) Aleksandar Stojanov (2021 -2022)
- (North Macedonia) Shefki Arifovski (2022 -)
- (North Macedonia) Blagoj Gucev (2022 -2023)
- (North Macedonia) Vase Bekarov (jul.2023 - Dec 2023)
- (North Macedonia) Aleksandar Stojanov (Dec 2023 -)
