= FK Butel =

ФК Бутел FK Butel
- Full name: Fudbalski Klub Butel Skopje
- Nickname(s): Гробари (Gravediggers)
- Founded: 1980
- Ground: Stadion Butel
- Capacity: 300
- League: OFS Skopje
- 2022–23: OFS Skopje, 4th
Home colours	Away colours

FK Butel (Macedonian: ФК Бутел) is a football club from Butel Municipality, Skopje, North Macedonia. They currently competing in the OFS Skopje.

== History ==
Founded in 1980, the club achieved its greatest success during the 1999–2000 season, when it competed in the Macedonian Second League.
