= FK Jugohrom =

- Full name: Fudbalski klub Jugohrom Jegunovce
- Founded: 1952; 74 years ago
- Ground: Stadion Jegunovce
- Chairman: Ljubomir Atanasovski
- Manager: Mile Petrovski

FK Jugohrom (Macedonian: ФК Југохром) is a football club based in the village of Jegunovce near Tetovo, North Macedonia. They play in the OFS Tetovo league.

== History ==
The club was founded in 1952.

== Honours ==
(North Macedonia) Macedonian Second League:

- Runners-up (1): 1997–98
- Third place (1): 2000–01
