= Argjend Beqiri =

Macedonian footballer (born 1974)

Personal information
- Date of birth: 3 April 1974 (age 52)
- Place of birth: Gostivar, SFR Yugoslavia
- Height: 1.78 m (5 ft 10 in)
- Position: Striker

Senior career*
Years	Team	Apps	(Gls)
1991–1994	Teteks	22	(11)
1994–1997	Sloga Jugomagnat	39	(14)
1997–1999	Antwerp	10	(0)
1999–1999	Shkëndija		
1999–2004	Sloga Jugomagnat	93	(56)
2004–2006	Aarau	44	(1)
2006–2008	Renova	24	(5)
2008	Shkëndija	9	(6)

International career
1999–2001	Macedonia	17	(1)

Managerial career
- 2015–2016: Gostivari
- 2017: Ferizaj
- * Club domestic league appearances and goals

Argjend Beqiri (Macedonian: Арѓенд Беќири, Arǵend Beḱiri, Albanian: Argjend Beqiri; born 3 April 1974) is a Macedonian football manager and former player who most recently managed Ferizaj. A striker, he was capped 17 times for the Macedonia national team.

== International career ==
Beqiri made his senior debut for Macedonia in a March 1996 friendly match against Malta and has earned a total of 17 caps, scoring 1 goal. His final international was an October 2001 FIFA World Cup qualification match against Slovakia.

== Career statistics ==
Scores and results list Macedonia's goal tally first.

No	Date	Venue	Opponent	Score	Result	Competition
1.	6 October 2000	Gradski stadion, Skopje, North Macedonia	Azerbaijan	3–0	3–0	2002 World Cup qualifier

== Honours ==
Sloga Jugomagnat

- Macedonian First League: 1999, 2000, 2001
- Macedonian Cup: 1996, 2000, 2004

Individual

- 1. MFL top scorer: 1999–2000, 2000–01
