= Miroslav Gjokić =

Macedonian footballer

Personal information
- Full name: Miroslav Ǵokić; Mиpocлaв Ѓoкиќ
- Date of birth: 17 January 1973 (age 53)
- Place of birth: SFR Yugoslavia
- Position: Striker

Senior career*
Years	Team	Apps	(Gls)
1996–1999	Sileks		
1999–2000	Hapoel Petah Tikva	9	(0)
2000	Istra	11	(1)
2000–2003	Pobeda	52	(33)
2004	Madžari Solidarnost	24	(5)
2004–2005	Sloga Jugomagnat	9	(0)

International career
1996–2002	Macedonia	8	(2)
- * Club domestic league appearances and goals

Miroslav Gjokikj (or romanized as Đokić, Djokic, Ǵokić, Gjokić) (Macedonian: Mиpocлaв Ѓoкиќ; born 17 January 1973) is a retired Macedonian international football player.

== International career ==
He made his senior debut for Macedonia in a November 1996 friendly match away against Malta and has earned a total of eight caps, scoring two goals. His final international was an April 2002 friendly against Finland.
