= Zoran Miserdovski =

Macedonian retired footballer (born 1975)

Personal information
- Full name: Zoran Miserdovski; Зоран Мисердовски
- Date of birth: 5 May 1975 (age 51)
- Place of birth: Skopje, SR Macedonia, SFR Yugoslavia
- Height: 1.85 m (6 ft 1 in)
- Position: Forward

Youth career
- FK Vardar

Senior career*
Years	Team	Apps	(Gls)
1998–2000	Sloga Jugomagnat	1	(0)
2000–2001	Vardar	22	(11)
2001–2003	Apollon Limassol	21	(3)
2003–2004	Vardar	2	(0)
2004–2005	Bashkimi	26	(14)
2005–2006	Kalamata	12	(6)
2006–2007	Rabotnički	5	(1)
2007–2008	Milano Kumanovo	8	(6)
2008	Renova	7	(1)
2010	Gorno Lisice	6	(1)

International career
1997–2000	Macedonia	7	(0)
- * Club domestic league appearances and goals

Zoran Miserdovski (born 5 May 1975) is a Macedonian retired footballer who played as a striker for Vardar Skopje.

== Club career ==
Miserdovski previously played in the Greek Beta Ethniki for Kalamata.

== International career ==
He made his senior debut for Macedonia in an October 1997 FIFA World Cup qualification match against Lithuania and has earned a total of 7 caps, scoring no goals. His final international was an October 2000 World Cup qualification match against Moldova.
