= Jegunovce =

Jegunovce Јегуновце
- Village
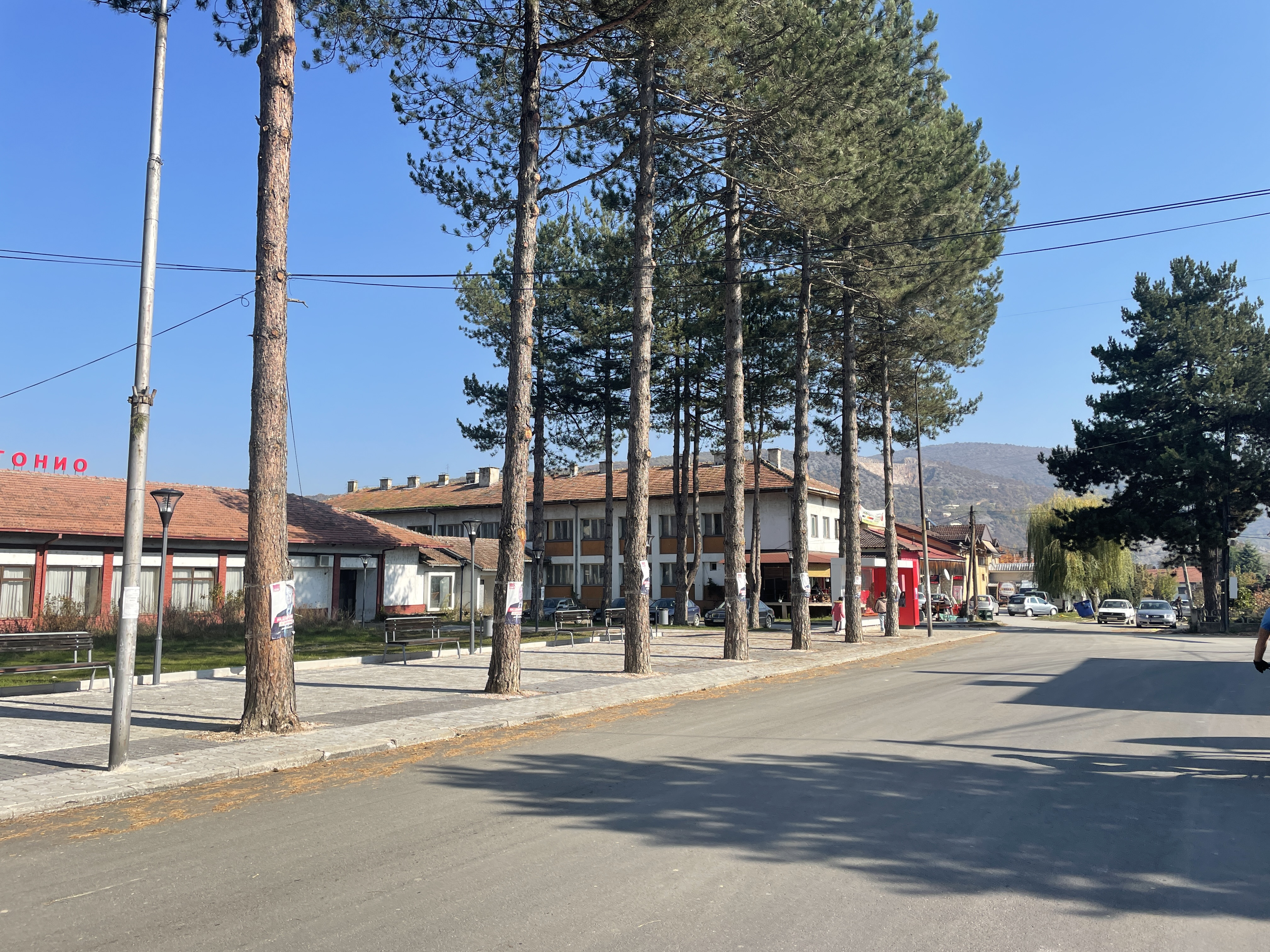
- Center of the village Jegunovce

- Location within North Macedonia
- Coordinates: 42°4′24″N 21°7′24″E
- Country: North Macedonia
- Region: Polog
- Municipality: Jegunovce

Population (2002)
  - Total: 846
- Time zone: UTC+1 (CET)
  - Summer (DST): UTC+2 (CEST)
- Postal code: 1215
- Area code: 044
- Vehicle registration: TE

Jegunovce (Macedonian: Јегуновце) is one of the larger villages in the Polog Valley, North Macedonia. It is located about 10 mi (15 km) northeast of the Macedonian city of Tetovo. It is the seat of the Jegunovce Municipality.

== History ==
Jegunovce began to grow from a village into a small town after World War II, when the new Yugoslav government under Josip Broz Tito built a large metallurgical plant (working mostly with chromium) in the area. The plant was named Jugohrom, and was one of the largest employers in Yugoslavia. The plant was renamed Silmak in 2002, and closed in 2006. After reopening and closing again in early 2009 due to the world financial crisis and rapid decline in demand, Silmak resumed operations again in July 2009.

== Demographics ==
According to the 2002 census, the village had a total of 846 inhabitants. Ethnic groups in the village include:

- Macedonians 804
- Serbs 13
- Romani 21
- Others 8

In statistics gathered by Vasil Kanchov in 1900, the village of Jegunovce (Egunovce) was inhabited by 110 Christian Bulgarians.

== Sports ==
The local football club is FK Jugohrom.

== See also ==
- Jegunovce municipality
- North Macedonia
- Municipalities of North Macedonia
