= Jegunovce Municipality =

Municipality of North Macedonia

Coordinates: 42.07°N 21.12°E

Municipality of Jegunovce Општина Јегуновце Komuna e Jegunocit
- Rural municipality
- Flag Coat of arms

- Country: North Macedonia
- Region: Polog
- Municipal seat: Jegunovce

Government
  - Mayor: Dimitar Kostadinoski (VMRO-DPMNE)

Area
  - Total: 176.93 km^{2} (68.31 sq mi)

Population
  - Total: 8,895
  - Density: 60.98/km^{2} (157.9/sq mi)
- Time zone: UTC+1 (CET)
- Postal code: 1215
- Area code: 044
- Vehicle registration: TE
- Website: http://www.OpstinaJegunovce.gov.mk

Jegunovce (Macedonian: Јегуновце, Albanian: Jegunoc) is a municipality in the northwest of North Macedonia. Jegunovce is also the name of the village where the municipal seat is found. Jegunovce Municipality is part of the Polog Statistical Region.

== Geography ==

The municipality borders Kosovo to the north and east, the city of Skopje to the southeast, Tearce Municipality to the west, Želino Municipality to the south and Tetovo Municipality to the southwest.

== History ==
By the 2003 territorial division of the republic, the rural Vratnica Municipality was attached to Jegunovce Municipality.

== Demographics ==
The municipality has 8,895 inhabitants, according to the 2021 North Macedonia census. Ethnic groups in the municipality:

| | 2002 | | 2021 | |
| | Number | % | Number | % |
| TOTAL | 10,790 | 100 | 8,895 | 100 |
| Macedonians | 5,963 | 55.26 | 4,746 | 53.36 |
| Albanians | 4,642 | 43.02 | 3,482 | 39.15 |
| Serbs | 109 | 1.01 | 89 | 1 |
| Roma | 41 | 0.38 | 49 | 0.55 |
| Turks | 4 | 0.04 | | |
| Bosniaks | 1 | 0.01 | | |
| Other / Undeclared / Unknown | 30 | 0.28 | 11 | 0.12 |
| Persons for whom data are taken from administrative sources | | | 518 | 5.82 |

- Demographic Trends Live births by ethnic affiliation of mother, 2010-2021

| | Macedonians | | Albanians | | Turks | | Serbs | | Roma | | Others | | TOTAL |
| Year | Births | % | Births | % | Births | % | Births | % | Births | % | Births | % | Births |
| 2010 | 66 | 50.00 | 63 | 47.73 | 0 | 0.00 | 0 | 0.00 | 2 | 1.52 | 1 | 0.76 | 132 |
| 2011 | 49 | 44.95 | 59 | 54.13 | 0 | 0.00 | 0 | 0.00 | 1 | 0.92 | 0 | 0.00 | 109 |
| 2012 | 53 | 47.75 | 54 | 48.65 | 0 | 0.00 | 0 | 0.00 | 3 | 2.70 | 1 | 0.90 | 111 |
| 2013 | 43 | 39.09 | 66 | 60.00 | 0 | 0.00 | 1 | 0.91 | 0 | 0.00 | 0 | 0.00 | 110 |
| 2014 | 52 | 47.27 | 58 | 52.73 | 0 | 0.00 | 0 | 0.00 | 0 | 0.00 | 0 | 0.00 | 110 |
| 2015 | 51 | 50.00 | 49 | 48.04 | 0 | 0.00 | 2 | 1.96 | 0 | 0.00 | 0 | 0.00 | 102 |
| 2016 | 42 | 43.75 | 52 | 54.17 | 0 | 0.00 | 0 | 0.00 | 1 | 1.04 | 1 | 1.04 | 96 |
| 2017 | 42 | 44.68 | 49 | 52.13 | 0 | 0.00 | 2 | 2.13 | 0 | 0.00 | 1 | 1.06 | 94 |
| 2018 | 44 | 42.72 | 55 | 53.40 | 0 | 0.00 | 1 | 0.97 | 1 | 0.97 | 2 | 1.94 | 103 |
| 2019 | 47 | 46.08 | 54 | 52.94 | 0 | 0.00 | 1 | 0.98 | 0 | 0.00 | 0 | 0.00 | 102 |
| 2020 | 34 | 45.33 | 37 | 49.33 | 1 | 1.33 | 0 | 0.00 | 3 | 4.00 | 0 | 0.00 | 75 |
| 2021 | 37 | 36.27 | 63 | 61.76 | 0 | 0.00 | 0 | 0.00 | 1 | 0.98 | 1 | 0.98 | 102 |
| 2022 | 41 | 42.71 | 52 | 54.17 | 0 | 0.00 | 1 | 1.04 | 2 | 2.08 | 0 | 0.00 | 96 |
| 2023 | 20 | 28.57 | 48 | 68.57 | 0 | 0.00 | 0 | 0.00 | 2 | 2.86 | 0 | 0.00 | 70 |
