= 2018–19 Macedonian Football Cup =

Tournament details
- Country: North Macedonia
- Dates: 22 August 2018 – 21 May 2019
- Teams: 30

Final positions
- Champions: Akademija Pandev (1st title)
- Runners-up: Makedonija G.P.

Tournament statistics
- Matches played: 42
- Goals scored: 130 (3.1 per match)
- Top goal scorer(s): Mario Krstovski (6 goals)

The 2018–19 Macedonian Football Cup was the 27th season of North Macedonia's football knockout competition. Shkëndija were the defending champions, having won their second title in the previous year.

== Competition calendar ==
Round	Date(s)	Fixtures	Clubs	New entries
First Round	22, 29 August & 5 September 2018	15	30 → 15	30
Second Round	19 September & 3 October 2018	14	14 → 7	none
Quarter-finals	7 November & 5 December 2018	8	8 → 4	1
Semi-finals	27 February & 10 April 2019	4	4 → 2	none
Final	22 May 2019	1	2 → 1	none

== First round ==
The matches were played on 22 August 2018.

=== Summary ===
Team 1	Score	Team 2
22 August 2018
Korabi (2)	1–0	Borec (2)
Vëllazërimi 77 (2)	0–4	Belasica (1)
Vardar Negotino (2)	1–3	Skopje (2)
Fortuna (3)	0–6	Rabotnichki (1)
Labunishta (2)	1–3	Akademija Pandev (1)
Kit-Go (2)	2–0	Shkupi (1)
Poeshevo (4)	0–8	Bregalnica (2)
Vardari Forino (3)	0–4	Vardar (1)
Osogovo (3)	0–1	Pelister (2)
Teteks (2)	1–1 (3–4 p)	Gostivar (2)
Bratstvo-Vlaznimi (3)	0–7	Sileks (1)
Tikvesh (2)	2–1	Renova (1)
Prevalec (3)	0–2	Makedonija G.P. (1)
29 August 2018
Struga (2)	1–2	Pobeda (1)
5 September 2018
Kozhuf (2)	0–2	Shkëndija (1)

=== Matches ===
22 August 2018
17:00 CEST

Korabi (2)	1–0	Borec (2)
Klobuchishta 69' (pen.)	Report

Gradski stadion, Debar
Referee: Konstantin Vlaho (Skopje)

22 August 2018
17:00 CEST

Vëllazërimi 77 (2)	0–4	Belasica (1)
	Report	Djonov 41'; Milushev 50'; Ismail 70' (o.g.); Gorgiev 80'

Gradski stadion, Kichevo
Referee: Jovan Kachevski (Struga)

22 August 2018
17:00 CEST

Vardar Negotino (2)	1–3	Skopje (2)
Shishkov 71'	Report	Aleksikj 14'; Janevski 33'; Ristovski 90+2'

Cvaj Arena, Negotino
Referee: Blagojche Ralevski (Bitola)

22 August 2018
17:00 CEST

Fortuna (3)	0–6	Rabotnichki (1)
	Report	Chinedu 3', 9', 84'; Stoimenovski 51'; Stankovski 62'; Jankulovski 82'

Stadion Boris Trajkovski, Skopje
Referee: Darko Stojchevski (Skopje)

22 August 2018
17:00 CEST

Labunishta (2)	1–3	Akademija Pandev (1)
Milevski 76'	Report	Mishov 45+3'; Doriev 72'; Iliev 85'

Gradska Plazha, Struga
Referee: Aleksandar Grujoski (Kichevo)

22 August 2018
17:00 CEST

Kit-Go (2)	2–0	Shkupi (1)
Stojanov 13', 90+4'	Report

Gradski stadion, Pehchevo
Referee: Josip Barton (Skopje)

22 August 2018
17:00 CEST

Poeshevo (4)	0–8	Bregalnica (2)
	Report	Velinovski 42', 63', 75'; Rajkov 45+1'; Runtev 62'; Antonov 82'; Manev 84'; Nikolovski 90' (o.g.)

Stadion Novaci, Novaci
Referee: Kiril Smokvoski (Prilep)

22 August 2018
17:00 CEST

Vardari Forino (3)	0–4	Vardar (1)
	Report	Maksimov 22', 60'; Antovski 74'; Popzlatanov 79'

Stadion Leska, Forino
Referee: Marjan Markoski (Ohrid)

22 August 2018
17:00 CEST

Osogovo (3)	0–1	Pelister (2)
	Report	Glavevski 71'

Stadion Nikola Mantov, Kochani
Referee: Zorancho Temelkov (Kavadarci)

22 August 2018
17:00 CEST

Teteks (2)	1–1	Gostivar (2)
Lama 90'	Report	Zeqiri 8'
Penalties
	3–4

AMS Stadium, Tetovo
Referee: Stojanche Stojanov (Shtip)

22 August 2018
17:00 CEST

Bratstvo-Vlaznimi (3)	0–7	Sileks (1)
	Report	Ivanov 32'; Ljamchevski 42'; Drašković 45+1', 62'; Aleksovski 64', 81' (pen.); Mitevski 66'

Gradski stadion, Kratovo
Referee: Kristijan Gjurovski (Skopje)

22 August 2018
17:00 CEST

Tikvesh (2)	2–1	Renova (1)
Mitev 26'; I. Ivanovski 77'	Report	Ramadani 67'

Gradski stadion, Kavadarci
Referee: Igor Stojchevski (Skopje)

22 August 2018
17:00 CEST

Prevalec (3)	0–2	Makedonija G.P. (1)
	Report	Luiz Felipe 58'; Miovski 72'

Gradski stadion, Veles
Referee: Bobi Velichkov (Veles)

29 August 2018
17:00 CEST

Struga (2)	1–2	Pobeda (1)
Kochoski 47'	Report	Naumoski 21' (pen.); Nwabueze 75'

Gradska Plazha, Struga
Referee: Marjan Gocevski (Strumica)

5 September 2018
15:30 CEST

Kozhuf (2)	0–2	Shkëndija (1)
	Report	Ibraimi 13'; Imeri 28'

Gradski stadion, Gevgelija
Referee: Stojanche Trpchevski (Kavadarci)

== Second round ==
The first legs were played on 19 September and the second legs will be played on 3 October 2018.

=== Summary ===
Team 1	Agg.	Team 2	1st leg	2nd leg
Tikvesh (2)	1–2	Rabotnichki (1)	0–1	1–1
Vardar (1)	2–3	Makedonija G.P. (1)	1–1	1–2
Pelister (2)	1–5	Belasica (1)	0–2	1–3
Gostivar (2)	2–6	Pobeda (1)	1–2	1–4
Bregalnica (2)	3–6	Akademija Pandev (1)	2–6	1–0
Skopje (2)	1–4	Sileks (1)	0–2	1–2
Shkëndija (1)	7–0	Kit-Go (2)	2–0	5–0
Korabi (2)	bye			

=== Matches ===
19 September 2018
15:30 CEST

Tikvesh (2)	0–1	Rabotnichki (1)
	Report	Petkovski 77'

Gradski stadion, Kavadarci
Referee: Vasko Mavrov (Strumica)
3 October 2018
15:00 CEST

Rabotnichki (1)	1–1	Tikvesh (2)
Fazliu 82'	Report	Mishov 85'

Petar Miloshevski Training Centre, Skopje
Referee: Kiril Smokvoski (Prilep)

Rabotnichki won 2–1 on aggregate.

19 September 2018
15:30 CEST

Vardar (1)	1–1	Makedonija G.P. (1)
Lira 72'	Report	Kirovski 13'

Stadion Boris Trajkovski, Skopje
Referee: Marjan Mladenovski (Skopje)
3 October 2018
15:00 CEST

Makedonija G.P. (1)	2–1	Vardar (1)
Kirovski 13', 62'	Report	Ibishi 34'

Stadion Gjorche Petrov, Skopje
Referee: Zorancho Temelkov (Kavadarci)

Makedonija G.P. won 3–2 on aggregate.

19 September 2018
15:30 CEST

Pelister (2)	0–2	Belasica (1)
	Report	Sulev 18'; Milushev 73'

Stadion Tumbe Kafe, Bitola
Referee: Jovan Kachevski (Struga)
3 October 2018
15:00 CEST

Belasica (1)	3–1	Pelister (2)
Gorgiev 65'; F. Ivanovski 67' (pen.), 71'	Report	Boshkovski 39'

Stadion Mladost, Strumica
Referee: Krumislav Gjorgiev (Shtip)

Belasica won 5–1 on aggregate.

19 September 2018
15:30 CEST

Gostivar (2)	1–2	Pobeda (1)
Zeqiri 64'	Report	Kalanoski 48'; Makota 86'

Gradski stadion, Gostivar
Referee: Konstantin Vlaho (Skopje)
3 October 2018
15:00 CEST

Pobeda (1)	4–1	Gostivar (2)
Velkoski 19'; Geshoski 37'; Efremov 40'; Timovski 65'	Report	Ismaili 39'

Stadion Mogila, Prilep
Referee: Stojanche Trpchevski (Kavadarci)

Pobeda won 6–2 on aggregate.

19 September 2018
15:30 CEST

Bregalnica (2)	2–6	Akademija Pandev (1)
L. Ilijev 22'; Trifunovski 58'	Report	Krstovski 5', 12', 57', 68'; Iliev 88', 90+3'

Gradski stadion, Shtip
Referee: Marjan Markoski (Ohrid)
3 October 2018
15:00 CEST

Akademija Pandev (1)	0–1	Bregalnica (2)
	Report	Kocev 23'

Stadion Kukush, Turnovo
Referee: Furkan Idrizi (Tetovo)

Bregalnica won 6–3 on aggregate.

19 September 2018
15:30 CEST

Skopje (2)	0–2	Sileks (1)
	Report	Aleksovski 66'; Jusuf 85'

Stadion Zhelezarnica, Skopje
Referee: Stojanche Stojanov (Shtip)
3 October 2018
15:00 CEST

Sileks (1)	2–1	Skopje (2)
Dodev 52', 57'	Report	Panovski 3' (o.g.)

Gradski stadion, Kratovo
Referee: Nderim Tefiku (Kumanovo)

Sileks won 4–1 on aggregate.

19 September 2018
15:30 CEST

Shkëndija (1)	2–0	Kit-Go (2)
Alimi 22'; Imeri 24'	Report

Gradski stadion, Tetovo
Referee: Marjan Stojanovski (Kichevo)
3 October 2018
15:00 CEST

Kit-Go (2)	0–5	Shkëndija (1)
	Report	Shefiti 2', 68', 90'; Mici 20'; Fazli 28'

Gradski stadion, Pehchevo
Referee: Marjan Gocevski (Strumica)

Shkëndija won 7–0 on aggregate.

== Quarter-finals ==
The first legs were played on 7 November and the second legs were played on 5 December 2018.

=== Summary ===
Team 1	Agg.	Team 2	1st leg	2nd leg
Shkëndija (1)	0–3	Pobeda (1)	0–1	0–2
Sileks (1)	0–4	Belasica (1)	0–2	0–2
Akademija Pandev (1)	9–2	Korabi (2)	3–1	6–1
Makedonija G.P. (1)	2–0	Rabotnichki (1)	1–0	1–0

=== Matches ===
7 November 2018
13:00 CET

Shkëndija (1)	0–1	Pobeda (1)
	Report	Makota 19'

Gradski stadion, Tetovo
Referee: Konstantin Vlaho (Skopje)
5 December 2018
13:00 CET

Pobeda (1)	2–0	Shkëndija (1)
Makota 22', 55'	Report

Stadion Tumbe Kafe, Bitola
Referee: Dimitar Mechkarovski (Skopje)

Pobeda won 3–0 on aggregate.

7 November 2018
13:00 CET

Sileks (1)	0–2	Belasica (1)
	Report	Sulev 57'; Baldovaliev 75' (pen.)

Gradski stadion, Kratovo
Referee: Stojanche Stojanov (Shtip)
5 December 2018
13:00 CET

Belasica (1)	2–0	Sileks (1)
Milushev 47'; Gjorgiev 78'	Report

Stadion Mladost, Strumica
Referee: Petar Mantev (Negotino)

Belasica won 4–0 on aggregate.

7 November 2018
13:00 CET

Akademija Pandev (1)	3–1	Korabi (2)
Mihailov 7'; Pandev 34'; Doriev 51'	Report	Mucha 40'

Stadion Kukush, Turnovo
Referee: Aleksandar Grujovski (Kichevo)
5 December 2018
13:00 CET

Korabi (2)	1–6	Akademija Pandev (1)
Mersovski 33'	Report	Milovanovikj 32'; Iliev 65', 67'; Mihailov 76'; Krstovski 83'

Gradski stadion, Debar
Referee: Konstantin Vlaho (Skopje)

Akademija Pandev won 9–2 on aggregate.

7 November 2018
13:00 CET

Makedonija G.P. (1)	1–0	Rabotnichki (1)
Robson 47'	Report

Stadion Gjorche Petrov, Skopje
Referee: Vasko Mavrov (Strumica)
5 December 2018
13:00 CET

Rabotnichki (1)	0–1	Makedonija G.P. (1)
	Report	Kirovski 71'

Philip II Arena, Skopje
Referee: Jovan Kachevski (Struga)

Makedonija G.P. won 2–0 on aggregate.

== Semi-finals ==
The first legs were played on 27 February and the second legs on 10 April 2019.

=== Summary ===
Team 1	Agg.	Team 2	1st leg	2nd leg
Akademija Pandev (1)	6–2	Pobeda (1)	3–1	3–1
Belasica (1)	0–2	Makedonija G.P. (1)	0–1	0–1

=== Matches ===
27 February 2019
14:00 CET

Belasica (1)	0–1	Makedonija G.P. (1)
	Report	Padu 33'

Stadion Mladost, Strumica
Attendance: 200
Referee: Marjan Markoski (Ohrid)
10 April 2019
15:30 CEST

Makedonija G.P. (1)	1–0	Belasica (1)
Djonov 54' (o.g.)	Report

Stadion Gjorche Petrov, Skopje
Referee: Marjan Eckoski (Ohrid)

Makedonija G.P. won 2–0 on aggregate.

6 March 2019
14:00 CET

Akademija Pandev (1)	3–1	Pobeda (1)
Velinov 53'; Milovanovikj 54', 62'	Report	Makota 81'

Stadion Mladost, Strumica
Attendance: 600
Referee: Josip Barton (Skopje)
10 April 2019
15:30 CEST

Pobeda (1)	1–3	Akademija Pandev (1)
Kalanoski 3'	Report	Stoilov 48' (pen.); Velinov 56'; Stojkoski 85'

Gradski stadion, Kavadarci
Referee: Dejan Jakimovski (Skopje)

Akademija Pandev won 6–2 on aggregate.

== Final ==
22 May 2019
18:30 CEST

Makedonija G.P. (1)	2–2 (a.e.t.)	Akademija Pandev (1)
da Silva 21'; Tanturovski 84'	Report	Pandev 10'; Doriev 86' (pen.)
Penalties
da Silva (penalty missed); Carvalho (penalty scored); Penalva (penalty scored); Tanturovski (penalty missed)	2–4	(penalty scored) Stoilov; (penalty scored) Doriev; (penalty scored) Iliev; (penalty scored) Velinov

Toshe Proeski Arena, Skopje
Attendance: 3,000
Referee: Marjan Eckoski (Ohrid)

== Season statistics ==
=== Top scorers ===
As of 23 May 2019

Rank	Player	Club	Goals
1	(North Macedonia) Mario Krstovski	Akademija Pandev	6
2	(North Macedonia) Tomislav Iliev	Akademija Pandev	5
2	(Cameroon) Yannick Makota	Pobeda	5
4	(North Macedonia) Hristijan Kirovski	Makedonija GP	4
5	(North Macedonia) Darko Aleksovski	Sileks	3
5	(North Macedonia) Ljupcho Doriev	Akademija Pandev	3
5	(Nigeria) Chinedu Charles Geoffrey	Rabotnichki	3
5	(North Macedonia) Pepi Gorgiev	Belasica	3
5	(North Macedonia) Daniel Milovanovikj	Akademija Pandev	3
5	(North Macedonia) Aleksandar Milushev	Belasica	3
5	(Albania) Shefit Shefiti	Shkëndija	3
5	(North Macedonia) Kristijan Velinovski	Bregalnica	3

== See also ==
- 2018–19 Macedonian First Football League
- 2018–19 Macedonian Second Football League
- 2018–19 Macedonian Third Football League
