= 2020–21 Macedonian Football Cup =

Tournament details
- Country: North Macedonia
- Dates: 22 September 2020 – 19 May 2021
- Teams: 30

Final positions
- Champions: Sileks (3rd title)
- Runners-up: Akademija Pandev

Tournament statistics
- Matches played: 27
- Goals scored: 75 (2.78 per match)

The 2020–21 Macedonian Football Cup was the 29th season of North Macedonia's football knockout competition. This edition did not have a defending champions due to the interruption of the previous edition due to the COVID-19 pandemic.

== Competition calendar ==
Round	Date(s)	Fixtures	Clubs	New entries
First Round	22, 23 September 2020	12	24 → 12	24
Second Round	21 October 2020	8	16 → 8	4
Quarter-finals	25 November 2020	4	8 → 4	none
Semi-finals	6, 7 April 2021	2	4 → 2	none
Final	19 May 2021	1	2 → 1	none

== First round ==
The draw was held on 15 September 2020. The semi-finalists from the previous season (Akademija Pandev, Bregalnica, Shkëndija, and Struga) received byes. Matches were played on 22 and 23 September 2020.

=== Summary ===
Team 1	Score	Team 2
22 September 2020
Vardari Forino (2)	2–2 (8–9 p)	Vardar (1)
23 September 2020
Kit-Go (2)	2–1	Skopje (2)
Makedonija G.P. (1)	0–0 (5–4 p)	Pobeda (2)
Pelister (1)	4–0	Ljuboten (3)
Sloga 1934 (2)	1–2	Shkupi (1)
Veleshta (2)	1–2	Kozhuf (2)
Rosoman 83 (2)	1–5	Belasica (1)
Ohrid (2)	0–4	Renova (1)
Sileks (1)	3–0	Labunishta (2)
Kamenica Sasa (2)	2–2 (3–1 p)	Borec (1)
Gostivar (2)	5–0	Tikvesh (2)
Vëllazërimi 77 (2)	0–0 (3–4 p)	Rabotnichki (1)

=== Matches ===
22 September 2020
15:30 CEST

Vardari Forino (2)	2–2	Vardar (1)
Aliji 72' (pen.), 74'	Report	Blazhevski 38' (pen.); Petkovski 56'
Penalties
Aziri (penalty scored); Asani (penalty missed); Bekier (penalty scored); Aliji (penalty scored); Luma (penalty missed); Aliu (penalty scored); Curi (penalty scored); Leskaroski (penalty scored); Sinani (penalty missed)	6–7	(penalty scored) Stojanovski; (penalty missed) Partalko; (penalty scored) Gudjufi; (penalty missed) Velkovski; (penalty scored) Redjepi; (penalty scored) Gjurkovski; (penalty scored) Krstevski; (penalty scored) Radulovikj-Velichkovikj; (penalty scored) Guguljanov

Gradski stadion, Gostivar
Referee: Blagojche Ralevski (Bitola)

23 September 2020
15:30 CEST

Kit-Go (2)	2–1	Skopje (2)
Dujovski 23'; Runtev 66'	Report	Janakievski 61' (pen.)

Gradski stadion, Shtip
Referee: Sashko Ristov (Strumica)

23 September 2020
15:30 CEST

Makedonija G.P. (1)	0–0	Pobeda (2)
	Report
Penalties
Kitanovski (penalty scored); Mishevski (penalty scored); Augusto (penalty scored); Lichina (penalty scored); Emini (penalty scored)	5–4	(penalty scored) Angjeleski; (penalty scored) Damevski; (penalty scored) Karapeev; (penalty scored) Spirkoski; (penalty missed) Stolevski

Stadion Gjorche Petrov, Skopje
Referee: Nderim Tefiku (Kumanovo)

23 September 2020
15:30 CEST

Pelister (1)	4–0	Ljuboten (3)
Hot 58'; Manevski 77'; Fazliu 79', 82'	Report 1 Report 2

Stadion Tumbe Kafe, Bitola
Referee: Misho Gjorgjieski (Ohrid)

23 September 2020
15:30 CEST

Sloga 1934 (2)	1–2	Shkupi (1)
Bujchevski 58'	Report	Darboe 20'; Álvarez 43'

Stadion Filip II, Vinica
Referee: Krumislav Gjorgiev (Shtip)

23 September 2020
15:30 CEST

Veleshta (2)	1–2	Kozhuf (2)
Maleski 59'	Report	Todorov 69' (pen.); Stojkovski 87'

Stadion Veleshta, Veleshta
Referee: Nikola Ivanov (Veles)

23 September 2020
15:30 CEST

Rosoman 83 (2)	1–5	Belasica (1)
Gjorgjiev 53' (pen.)	Report	Mitev 9'; Kalanoski 12', 26', 63'; Sulev 46'

AMS Stadium, Rosoman
Referee: Nikola Kostenchev (Skopje)

23 September 2020
15:30 CEST

Ohrid (2)	0–4	Renova (1)
	Report	Shefiti 12'; Jasharoski 24'; Veliu 68'; E. Ramadani 72'

SRC Biljanini Izvori, Ohrid
Referee: Vladimir Gjorgjievski (Bitola)

23 September 2020
15:30 CEST

Sileks (1)	3–0	Borec (1)
Đurić 30'; Gorgiev 70'; Ristov 88'	Report

Gradski stadion, Kratovo
Referee: Kristijan Garevski (Skopje)

23 September 2020
15:30 CEST

Kamenica Sasa (2)	2–2	Borec (1)
Gocevski 11'; Donov 57'	Report	Stojchevski 2'; Trajanovski 18'
Penalties
Bozhinov (penalty scored); Efremov (penalty scored); Donov (penalty scored)	3–1	(penalty missed) Kocev; (penalty scored) Ristovski; (penalty missed) Desnikj; (penalty missed) Risteski

Gradski stadion, Makedonska Kamenica
Referee: Done Ristevski (Gevgelija)

23 September 2020
15:30 CEST

Gostivar (2)	5–0	Tikvesh (2)
Bekteshi 41'; Beluli 60'; Kjaili 72', 79'; Spahiu 89'	Report

Gradski stadion, Gostivar
Referee: Konstantin Vlaho (Skopje)

23 September 2020
15:30 CEST

Vëllazërimi 77 (2)	0–0	Rabotnichki (1)
	Report
Penalties
Adili (penalty missed); Ramani (penalty missed); Sejdini (penalty scored); M. Ibraimi (penalty scored); A. Ramadani (penalty scored); Aliu (penalty missed)	3–4	(penalty missed) Muarem; (penalty scored) Gjurgjevikj; (penalty scored) Tosheski; (penalty missed) Siljanovski; (penalty scored) Đorđević; (penalty scored) Trajković

Vëllazërimi Arena, Kichevo
Referee: Furkan Idrizi (Tetovo)

== Second round ==
The draw was held on 29 September 2020. The matches were played on 21 October 2020.

=== Summary ===
Team 1	Score	Team 2
21 October 2020
Akademija Pandev (1)	1–0	Vardar (1)
Makedonija G.P. (1)	6–0	Kamenica Sasa (2)
Shkëndija (1)	1–0	Gostivar (2)
Shkupi (1)	5–0	Kit-Go (2)
Kozhuf (2)	1–3	Sileks (1)
Struga (1)	0–0 (4–3 p)	Rabotnichki (1)
Bregalnica (2)	0–1	Belasica (1)
Renova (1)	2–2 (8–7 p)	Pelister (1)

=== Matches ===
21 October 2020
14:30 CEST

Akademija Pandev (1)	1–0	Vardar (1)
Serafimov 90+1'	Report

Stadion Mladost, Strumica
Referee: Marjan Markoski (Ohrid)

21 October 2020
14:30 CEST

Makedonija G.P. (1)	6–0	Kamenica Sasa (2)
Bozhinovski 12', 37'; Kitanovski 21'; Adem 60' (pen.); Petrov 66'; Vosha 70'	Report

Stadion Gjorche Petrov, Skopje
Referee: Furkan Idrizi (Tetovo)

21 October 2020
14:30 CEST

Shkëndija (1)	1–0	Gostivar (2)
Totre 12' (pen.)	Report

Gradski stadion, Gostivar
Referee: Riste Sejmenov (Strumica)

21 October 2020
14:30 CEST

Shkupi (1)	5–0	Kit-Go (2)
Bianor 5'; Bilalli 7' (pen.); Glishikj 27'; Ademi 40'; Goudiaby 51'	Report

Stadion Boris Trajkovski, Skopje
Referee: Blagojche Ralevski (Bitola)

21 October 2020
14:30 CEST

Kozhuf (2)	1–3	Sileks (1)
Zumrovski 57'	Report	Đurić 11'; Drašković 30'; Kirovski 80'

Gradski stadion, Gevgelija
Referee: Bobi Velichkov (Veles)

21 October 2020
14:30 CEST

Struga (1)	0–0	Rabotnichki (1)
	Report
Penalties
Tairi (penalty missed); Hani (penalty missed); Altiparmakovski (penalty scored); Ristevski (penalty scored); Lena (penalty scored); Cake (penalty scored)	4–3	(penalty scored) Siljanovski; (penalty scored) Tosheski; (penalty missed) Petkovski; (penalty missed) Trajković; (penalty scored) Đorđević

Gradska Plazha, Struga
Referee: Marjan Stojanovski (Kichevo)

21 October 2020
14:30 CEST

Bregalnica (2)	0–1	Belasica (1)
	Report	Robson 50'

Gradski stadion, Shtip
Referee: Nikola Kostenchev (Skopje)

21 October 2020
14:30 CEST

Renova (1)	2–2	Pelister (1)
Shefiti 83'; Jasharoski 86'	Report	Talevski 26'; Fazliu 51'
Penalties
	8–7

Rechica Stadium, Golema Rechica
Referee: Jovan Kachevski (Struga)

== Quarter-finals ==
The draw was held on 27 October 2020. The matches were played on 25 November 2020.

=== Summary ===
Team 1	Score	Team 2
25 November 2020
Akademija Pandev (1)	2–1	Shkupi (1)
Struga (1)	1–0	Renova (1)
Belasica (1)	1–4	Makedonija G.P. (1)
Sileks (1)	0–0 (4–2 p)	Shkëndija (1)

=== Matches ===
25 November 2020
13:00 CET

Akademija Pandev (1)	2–1	Shkupi (1)
Tomovski 36'; Iliev 69'	Report	Darboe 63'

Sports Center "Pandev", Strumica
Referee: Marjan Eckoski (Ohrid)

25 November 2020
13:00 CET

Struga (1)	1–0	Renova (1)
Lena 54' (pen.)	Report

Gradska Plazha, Struga
Referee: Marjan Gocevski (Strumica)

25 November 2020
13:00 CET

Belasica (1)	1–4	Makedonija G.P. (1)
Kalanoski 43'	Report	Adem 39', 77'; Anderson 57'; Khalid 85'

Stadion Mladost, Strumica
Referee: Jovan Kachevski (Struga)

25 November 2020
13:00 CET

Sileks (1)	0–0	Shkëndija (1)
	Report
Penalties
Ristov (penalty scored); Drašković (penalty missed); Kostovski (penalty scored); Serafimovski (penalty scored); Karcheski (penalty scored)	4–2	(penalty missed) Totre; (penalty scored) Nafiu; (penalty missed) B. Ibraimi; (penalty scored) Dita

Gradski stadion, Kratovo
Referee: Marjan Markoski (Ohrid)

== Semi-finals ==
The draw was held on 16 March 2021. The matches were played on 6 and 7 April 2021.

=== Summary ===
Team 1	Score	Team 2
6 April 2021
Makedonija G.P. (1)	1–3	Akademija Pandev (1)
7 April 2021
Struga (1)	0–1	Sileks (1)

=== Matches ===
6 April 2021
13:00 CEST

Makedonija G.P. (1)	1–3	Akademija Pandev (1)
Ajrullahu 30'	Report	Ferati 14'; Radeski 55', 90+5'

Stadion Gjorche Petrov, Skopje
Referee: Jovan Kachevski (Struga)

7 April 2021
14:00 CEST

Struga (1)	0–1	Sileks (1)
	Report	Karakamishev 82'

Gradska Plazha, Struga
Referee: Krumislav Gjorgjiev (Shtip)

== Final ==
19 May 2021
19:00 CEST

Akademija Pandev (1)	0–0 (a.e.t.)	Sileks (1)
	Report
Penalties
Stoilov (penalty scored); Iliev (penalty scored); Velinovski (penalty missed); Dimoski (penalty missed); Markoski (penalty scored)	3–4	(penalty scored) Timovski; (penalty scored) Ivanovski; (penalty scored) Gorgiev; (penalty missed) Shterev; (penalty scored) Karcheski

Toshe Proeski Arena, Skopje
Attendance: 0
Referee: Aleksandar Stavrev (Skopje)

== Season statistics ==
=== Top scorers ===
As of 25 November 2020

Rank	Player	Club	Goals
1	(North Macedonia) Antonio Kalanoski	Belasica	4
2	(North Macedonia) Ermedin Adem	Makedonija G.P.	3
2	(North Macedonia) Lavdrim Fazliu	Pelister	3
4	(North Macedonia) Elmir Aliji	Vardari	2
4	(North Macedonia) Bobi Bozhinovski	Makedonija G.P.	2
4	(The Gambia) Dembo Darboe	Shkupi	2
4	(Serbia) Stefan Đurić	Sileks	2
4	(North Macedonia) Alen Jasharoski	Renova	2
4	(North Macedonia) Valtrin Qaili	Gostivar	2
4	(North Macedonia) Shefit Shefiti	Renova	2

== See also ==
- 2020–21 Macedonian First Football League
- 2020–21 Macedonian Second Football League
