= 2019–20 Macedonian Second Football League =

Macedonian Second League
- Season: 2019–20
- Promoted: Belasica; Pelister

The 2019–20 Macedonian Second Football League was the 28th season of the Macedonian Second Football League, the second division in the Macedonian football league system. The season began on 24 August 2019 and concluded on 26 May 2020.

== East ==
=== Participating teams ===
Location of teams in 2019–20 Macedonian Second League - East

Club	City	Stadium	Capacity
Belasica	Strumica	Stadion Blagoj Istatov	9,200
Bregalnica	Shtip	Gradski stadion Shtip	4,000
Kit-Go	Pehchevo	Gradski stadion Pehchevo	1,200
Kozhuf	Gevgelija	Gradski stadion Gevgelija	1,400
Osogovo	Kochani	Stadion Nikola Mantov	4,350
Pitu Guli	Krushevo	AMS Mogila	
Plachkovica	Radovish	Gradski stadion Radovish	2,000
Pobeda	Prilep	AMS Mogila	
Sasa	Makedonska Kamenica	Gradski stadion M. Kamenica	5,000
Tikvesh	Kavadarci	Gradski Stadion Kavadarci	7,500

=== League table ===
Pos	Team	Pld	W	D	L	GF	GA	GD	Pts	Promotion or relegation
1	Belasica (C, P)	16	13	1	2	37	9	+28	40	Promotion to Macedonian First League
2	Bregalnica	16	11	4	1	39	9	+30	37	
3	Tikvesh	16	9	4	3	30	12	+18	31	
4	Kit-Go	16	9	4	3	23	13	+10	31	
5	Kozhuf	16	9	3	4	26	16	+10	30	
6	Sasa	16	7	2	7	26	23	+3	23	
7	Plachkovica	16	3	4	9	17	30	−13	13	
8	Pobeda	16	3	3	10	17	29	−12	12	
9	Osogovo	16	2	0	14	12	44	−32	6	
10	Pitu Guli (R)	16	1	1	14	11	53	−42	4	Relegation to Macedonian Third League

Source: MacedonianFootball.com
Rules for classification: 1) Points; 2) Head-to-head points; 3) Head-to-head goal difference; 4) Head-to-head away goals scored
(C) Champions; (P) Promoted; (R) Relegated

=== Results ===
Home \ Away	BEL	BRE	KGO	KOZ	OSO	PIT	PLA	POB	SAS	TIK
Belasica	—	0–0	3–0	1–2	3–0	2–0	4–2	1–0	2–1	—
Bregalnica Shtip	—	—	1–0	3–0	5–0	5–0	2–1	3–0	1–1	0–1
Kit-Go	2–0	1–1	—	1–1	1–0	3–1	2–0	2–1	—	1–1
Kozhuf	1–2	—	0–2	—	1–0	6–1	3–0	2–1	1–0	1–1
Osogovo	0–2	1–2	1–2	0–4	—	1–3	—	1–0	2–5	0–1
Pitu Guli	0–8	0–6	1–2	—	1–3	—	0–1	2–2	0–2	0–1
Plachkovica	0–1	2–4	1–1	1–1	2–1	—	—	0–0	0–2	1–1
Pobeda	0–3	0–2	—	0–1	5–1	2–1	2–5	—	2–0	2–2
Sasa	0–3	2–2	0–3	3–1	—	4–1	3–0	2–0	—	0–1
Tikvesh	1–2	0–2	1–0	0–1	7–1	5–0	3–1	—	4–0	—

Source: MacedonianFootball.com
Legend: Blue = home team win; Yellow = draw; Red = away team win.

=== Position by round ===
Team ╲ Round	1	2	3	4	5	6	7	8	9	10	11	12	13	14	15	16
Belasica	1	2	2	3	2	2	2	3	1	2	1	1	1	1	1	1
Bregalnica	2	1	1	1	4	4	4	4	4	3	2	2	2	2	2	2
Tikvesh	6	3	3	2	1	1	1	2	3	4	4	4	3	4	3	3
Kit-Go	10	8	8	5	5	5	5	5	5	5	5	5	4	3	4	4
Kozhuf	5	7	4	4	3	3	3	1	2	1	3	3	5	5	5	5
Sasa	7	4	5	6	6	7	6	6	6	6	6	6	6	6	6	6
Plachkovica	8	9	9	7	7	8	8	7	7	7	7	7	7	7	7	7
Pobeda	4	6	6	8	8	6	7	8	8	8	8	8	8	8	8	8
Osogovo	9	0	10	10	9	9	9	9	9	9	9	9	9	9	9	9
Pitu Guli	3	5	7	9	10	10	10	10	10	10	10	10	10	10	10	10

Leader and promotion to the Macedonian First League
Qualification for the Promotion play-off semi-finals
Relegation to the Macedonian Third League

Source: MacedonianFootball.com

=== Top scorers ===
As of 7 March 2020

Rank	Player	Club	Goals
1	(North Macedonia) Martin Mirčevski	Belasica	14
2	(North Macedonia) Pepi Gorgiev	Bregalnica	12
3	(North Macedonia) Andrej Kudijan	Plachkovica	10
4	(North Macedonia) Blagoja Geshoski	Pobeda	7
5	(North Macedonia) Ivan Nastevski	Bregalnica	6
5	(Bosnia and Herzegovina) Boško Stupić	Kit-Go	6
5	(North Macedonia) Goran Zdravkov	Sasa	6
5	(North Macedonia) Zoran Zlatkovski	Sasa	6

== West ==
=== Participating teams ===
Location of teams in 2019–20 Macedonian Second League - West

Club	City	Stadium	Capacity
Drita	Bogovinje	Stadion Bogovinje	500
Gostivar	Gostivar	Gradski stadion Gostivar	1,000
Kadino	Kadino	Stadion Kadino	500
Korabi	Debar	Gradski stadion Debar	2,500
Labunishta	Labunishta	Stadion Gradska Plazha	500
Ohrid	Ohrid	SRC Biljanini Izvori	3,000
Pelister	Bitola	Stadion Tumbe Kafe	6,100
Skopje	Skopje	Stadion Zhelezarnica	3,000
Vardari	Forino	Gradski stadion Gostivar	1,000
Vëllazërimi 77	Kichevo	Velazerimi Arena	3,000

=== League table ===
Pos	Team	Pld	W	D	L	GF	GA	GD	Pts	Promotion or relegation
1	Pelister (C, P)	16	10	3	3	32	14	+18	33	Promotion to Macedonian First League
2	Skopje	16	9	2	5	21	14	+7	29	
3	Labunishta	16	8	3	5	25	18	+7	27	
4	Vëllazërimi 77	16	7	4	5	15	19	−4	25	
5	Gostivar	16	6	5	5	21	19	+2	23	
6	Vardari	16	6	3	7	23	21	+2	21	
7	Korabi	16	6	3	7	24	23	+1	21	
8	Drita	16	6	3	7	19	20	−1	21	
9	Ohrid	16	4	2	10	15	29	−14	14	
10	Kadino	16	2	4	10	15	33	−18	10	

Source: MacedonianFootball.com
Rules for classification: 1) Points; 2) Head-to-head points; 3) Head-to-head goal difference; 4) Head-to-head away goals scored
(C) Champions; (P) Promoted

=== Results ===
Home \ Away	DRI	GOS	KAD	KOR	LAB	OHR	PEL	SKO	VFO	VLZ
Drita	—	0–1	2–0	3–1	1–0	0–1	0–0	0–0	1–0	—
Gostivar	3–4	—	0–0	2–0	2–1	2–0	0–2	—	2–2	2–0
Kadino	3–3	1–1	—	3–1	1–2	2–1	—	0–1	1–2	0–0
Korabi	2–1	2–1	4–0	—	2–1	2–0	1–2	2–2	—	4–0
Labunishta	3–2	2–1	6–2	—	—	3–2	1–1	2–0	1–0	0–1
Ohrid	—	0–1	3–2	1–1	0–0	—	1–5	1–0	1–0	1–2
Pelister	3–1	0–0	2–0	3–0	—	2–1	—	2–3	2–0	3–1
Skopje	0–1	4–2	2–0	1–0	1–0	—	2–1	—	3–0	2–0
Vardari	2–0	—	3–0	2–2	1–2	4–1	3–2	2–0	—	0–0
Vëllazërimi 77	1–0	1–1	—	1–0	1–1	3–1	0–2	1–0	3–2	—

Source: MacedonianFootball.com
Legend: Blue = home team win; Yellow = draw; Red = away team win.

=== Position by round ===
Team ╲ Round	1	2	3	4	5	6	7	8	9	10	11	12	13	14	15	16
Pelister	1	5	3	2	1	1	1	1	1	1	1	2	1	1	1	1
Skopje	6	2	1	1	4	5	5	8	5	4	3	1	3	2	2	2
Labunishta	3	3	2	5	3	4	3	3	3	2	4	3	2	4	3	3
Vëllazërimi 77	4	4	7	6	7	6	6	4	4	3	2	4	4	3	4	4
Gostivar	7	7	4	3	2	3	4	5	6	5	5	5	5	6	6	5
Vardari	10	6	8	8	8	8	7	6	7	7	6	6	6	7	5	6
Korabi	5	8	6	7	6	7	8	7	8	8	8	8	7	8	8	7
Drita	2	1	5	4	5	2	2	2	2	6	7	7	8	5	7	8
Ohrid	9	9	9	10	10	10	10	10	10	10	10	10	10	9	9	9
Kadino	8	10	10	9	9	9	9	9	9	9	9	9	9	10	10	10

Leader and promotion to the Macedonian First League
Qualification for the Promotion play-off semi-finals
Relegation to the Macedonian Third League

Source: MacedonianFootball.com

=== Top scorers ===
As of 7 March 2020

Rank	Player	Club	Goals
1	(North Macedonia) Elmir Aliji	Vardari	9
2	(North Macedonia) Egzon Aziri	Korabi	6
2	(North Macedonia) Blagojche Glavevski	Pelister	6
2	(North Macedonia) Mihajlo Jakimovski	Labunishta	6
5	(North Macedonia) Antonio Bujchevski	Pelister	5
5	(North Macedonia) Arian Ejupi	Vardari	5
5	(North Macedonia) Sunaj Hasan	Labunishta	5
5	(North Macedonia) Ensar Luma	Drita	5
5	(North Macedonia) Filip Petkovski	Skopje	5
5	(North Macedonia) Florent Ramadani	Drita	5

== See also ==
- 2019–20 Macedonian Football Cup
- 2019–20 Macedonian First Football League
