= 2018–19 Macedonian Second Football League =

Macedonian Second League
- Season: 2018–19
- Champions: Borec (East); Struga Trim-Lum (West)
- Promoted: Borec; Struga Trim-Lum
- Relegated: Detonit; Gench Kalemler; Goblen; Partizan; Teteks; Vardar (N.)
- Matches: 252 (Total); 126 (East); 126 (West)
- Biggest home win: Kit-Go 11–0 Partizan
- Biggest away win: Plachkovica 0–6 Bregalnica
- Highest scoring: Kit-Go 11–0 Partizan
- Longest winning run: 8 games Borec
- Longest unbeaten run: 14 games Struga Trim-Lum
- Longest winless run: 12 games Partizan
- Longest losing run: 12 games Partizan

The 2018–19 Macedonian Second Football League was the 27th season of the Macedonian Second Football League, the second division in the Macedonian football league system. The season began on 18 August 2018 and concluded on 25 May 2019.

== East ==
=== Participating teams ===
Location of teams in 2018–19 Macedonian Second League - East

Club	City	Stadium	Capacity
FK Borec	Veles	Gradski stadion Veles	2,000
FK Bregalnica	Shtip	Gradski stadion Shtip	4,000
FK Detonit Junior	Radovish	Gradski stadion Radovish	2,000
FK Kit-Go	Pehchevo	Gradski stadion Pehchevo	
FK Kozhuf	Gevgelija	Gradski stadion Gevgelija	2,500
FK Partizan	Obrshani		
FK Plachkovica	Radovish	Gradski stadion Radovish	2,000
FK Sasa	Makedonska Kamenica	Gradski stadion M. Kamenica	5,000
GFK Tikvesh	Kavadarci	Gradski Stadion Kavadarci	7,500
FK Vardar	Negotino	Gradski stadion Negotino	1,500

=== League table ===
Pos	Team	Pld	W	D	L	GF	GA	GD	Pts	Promotion or relegation
1	Borec (C, P)	27	21	3	3	63	17	+46	66	Promotion to Macedonian First League
2	Tikvesh	27	16	9	2	47	16	+31	57	Qualification to Promotion play-off semi-finals
3	Bregalnica	27	15	7	5	54	26	+28	52	
4	Kozhuf	27	15	7	5	39	18	+21	52	
5	Kit-Go	27	14	8	5	55	18	+37	50	
6	Plachkovica	27	7	7	13	27	39	−12	28	
7	Detonit Junior (R)	27	8	3	16	31	53	−22	27	Relegation to Macedonian Third League
8	Sasa (Note: Sasa stayed in the league after Dojransko Ezero, Tiverija and Detonit Junior rejected the application for playing in the Second League for the next season.)	27	5	5	17	24	55	−31	20	
9	Vardar Negotino (R)	27	4	2	21	19	60	−41	14	Relegation to Macedonian Third League
10	Partizan (R)	27	4	1	22	10	67	−57	13	Relegation to Macedonian Third League

Source: MacedonianFootball.com
Rules for classification: 1) Points; 2) Head-to-head points; 3) Head-to-head goal difference; 4) Head-to-head away goals scored
(C) Champions; (P) Promoted; (R) Relegated

=== Results ===
==== Matches 1–18 ====
Home \ Away	BOR	BRE	DET	KGO	KOZ	PAR	PLA	SAS	TIK	VRN
Borec	—	3–2	4–0	2–1	2–1	2–0	3–0	3–0	1–0	1–0
Bregalnica Shtip	0–2	—	4–2	2–2	0–0	2–0	2–0	2–0	1–1	3–1
Detonit Junior	0–1	2–0	—	0–1	1–3	3–0	0–2	2–2	1–1	3–1
Kit-Go	1–1	1–2	4–0	—	0–0	6–1	1–0	3–1	1–1	2–0
Kozhuf	2–1	0–0	3–0	0–0	—	2–0	3–1	4–0	0–2	1–0
Partizan	0–2	1–2	1–0	0–2	0–1	—	2–1	0–0	0–2	1–0
Plachkovica	1–4	0–6	0–1	0–0	0–1	2–0	—	2–1	1–1	3–1
Sasa	1–2	1–5	0–2	1–0	1–1	2–3	0–0	—	1–3	1–0
Tikvesh	3–0	1–0	2–0	1–0	0–0	3–1	4–2	3–0	—	3–1
Vardar Negotino	0–3	1–4	3–2	0–1	1–2	2–0	0–0	3–1	0–0	—

Source: MacedonianFootball.com
Legend: Blue = home team win; Yellow = draw; Red = away team win.

==== Matches 19–27 ====
Home \ Away	BOR	BRE	DET	KGO	KOZ	PAR	PLA	SAS	TIK	VRN
Borec	—	2–0	7–1	—	—	3–0	—	6–0	3–1	—
Bregalnica Shtip	—	—	3–0	1–1	—	—	2–2	—	0–0	4–0
Detonit Junior	—	—	—	—	—	5–0	0–0	2–1	—	4–2
Kit-Go	0–0	—	3–0	—	2–1	11–0	—	4–0	—	—
Kozhuf	3–1	2–3	2–0	—	—	2–0	—	2–1	—	—
Partizan	—	0–3	—	—	—	—	0–2	0–2	0–3	—
Plachkovica	0–0	—	—	0–4	2–0	—	—	—	—	5–0
Sasa	—	0–1	—	—	—	—	2–1	—	1–1	3–0
Tikvesh	—	—	3–0	3–2	0–0	—	1–0	—	—	4–0
Vardar Negotino	0–4	—	—	1–2	0–3	2–0	—	—	—	—

Source: MacedonianFootball.com
Legend: Blue = home team win; Yellow = draw; Red = away team win.

== West ==
=== Participating teams ===
Location of teams in 2018–19 Macedonian Second League - West

Club	City	Stadium	Capacity
FK Gench Kalemler	Dolna Banjica	Gradski stadion Gostivar	1,000
FK Goblen	Kumanovo	Gradski stadion Kumanovo	7,000
FK Gostivar	Gostivar	Gradski stadion Gostivar	1,000
FK Korabi	Debar	Gradski Stadion Debar	5,000
FK Labunishta	Labunishta	Stadion Kalishta	
FK Pelister	Bitola	Stadion Tumbe Kafe	8,000
FK Skopje	Skopje	Stadion Zhelezarnica	3,000
FK Struga	Struga	Stadion Gradska Plazha	800
FK Teteks	Tetovo	AMS Sportski Centar Tetovo	2,000
FK Velazerimi	Kichevo	Velazerimi Arena	3,000

=== League table ===
Pos	Team	Pld	W	D	L	GF	GA	GD	Pts	Promotion or relegation
1	Struga (C, P)	27	15	9	3	42	17	+25	54	Promotion to Macedonian First League
2	Labunishta	27	11	10	6	23	27	−4	43	Qualification to Promotion play-off semi-finals
3	Pelister	27	11	8	8	27	20	+7	41	
4	Vëllazërimi 77	27	11	6	10	34	32	+2	39	
5	Gostivar	27	10	8	9	40	34	+6	38	
6	Skopje	27	10	7	10	32	24	+8	37	
7	Korabi	27	10	6	11	32	30	+2	36	
8	Teteks (R)	27	9	5	13	28	34	−6	32	Relegation to Macedonian Third League
9	Gench Kalemler (R)	27	6	8	13	25	35	−10	26	Relegation to Macedonian Third League
10	Goblen (R)	27	4	9	14	15	45	−30	21	Relegation to Macedonian Third League

Source: MacedonianFootball.com
Rules for classification: 1) Points; 2) Head-to-head points; 3) Head-to-head goal difference; 4) Head-to-head away goals scored
(C) Champions; (P) Promoted; (R) Relegated

=== Results ===
==== Matches 1–18 ====
Home \ Away	GEN	GOB	GOS	KOR	LAB	PEL	SKO	STR	TET	VLZ
Gench Kalemler	—	1–1	3–2	3–1	0–0	0–0	1–1	0–2	1–1	2–3
Goblen	1–0	—	0–1	1–3	1–1	0–0	0–0	1–1	0–0	1–1
Gostivar	2–3	2–3	—	1–1	0–1	0–0	1–0	3–0	1–2	3–2
Korabi	3–0	3–0	0–2	—	0–0	0–0	1–0	0–0	2–1	2–4
Labunishta	1–0	2–0	0–1	0–0	—	2–1	2–0	2–2	0–3	1–0
Pelister	1–4	2–0	2–1	2–1	1–0	—	1–0	1–2	1–0	2–1
Skopje	3–0 (Note: Match was originally finished 0–1 for Gench Kalemler, but was awarded to Skopje because was Gench Kalemler not used enough number of youth players in the first half.)	1–3	2–1	2–1	6–0	0–0	—	0–1	3–1	1–0
Struga	1–0	1–1	1–4	2–0	0–0	1–0	0–0	—	1–0	1–2
Teteks	2–0	0–1	2–1	2–1	1–2 (Note: Match was originally finished 0–0, but was awarded to Teteks because was Labunishta not used enough number of youth players in the first half.)	2–1	1–2	1–1	—	0–3
Vëllazërimi 77	1–1	1–0	0–2	1–4	0–0	1–0	0–0	0–1	2–0	—

Source: MacedonianFootball.com
Legend: Blue = home team win; Yellow = draw; Red = away team win.

==== Matches 19–27 ====
Home \ Away	GEN	GOB	GOS	KOR	LAB	PEL	SKO	STR	TET	VLZ
Gench Kalemler	—	2–0	—	—	—	0–2	1–0	0–1	—	—
Goblen	—	—	0–3	0–2	0–1	—	—	—	0–4	—
Gostivar	1–0	—	—	1–1	2–2	2–2	—	—	—	1–1
Korabi	2–1	—	—	—	—	1–0	2–1	1–2	—	—
Labunishta	1–0	—	—	1–0	—	0–0	2–1	—	—	1–2
Pelister	—	4–0	—	—	—	—	2–0	1–1	0–1	1–0
Skopje	—	1–1	5–1	—	—	—	—	1–0	1–1	1–0
Struga	—	6–0	0–0	—	6–1	—	—	—	1–0	5–0
Teteks	2–1	—	1–1	1–0	0–1	—	—	—	—	—
Vëllazërimi 77	1–1	2–0	—	2–0	—	—	—	—	4–1	—

Source: MacedonianFootball.com
Legend: Blue = home team win; Yellow = draw; Red = away team win.

== Promotion play-off ==
=== Semi-final ===
2 June 2019
16:30 CEST

Tikvesh	6–3	Labunishta
Ilieski 8'; Mojsov 15', 48' (pen.); Ivanovski 20'; Delov 59'; Mitrev 67'	Report	Klechkaroski 23' (pen.), 89' (pen.); Rexhepi 64'

Gjorche Petrov Stadium, Skopje
Referee: Aleksandar Stavrev (Skopje)

=== Final ===
5 June 2019
16:30 CEST

Sileks	3–2	Tikvesh
Georgiev 12', 15'; Rajković 25'	Report	Ivanovski 22', 58'

Gjorche Petrov Stadium, Skopje
Referee: Dimitar Mechkarovski (Skopje)

== See also ==
- 2018–19 Macedonian Football Cup
- 2018–19 Macedonian First Football League
- 2018–19 Macedonian Third Football League
