= 2017–18 Macedonian Second Football League =

Macedonian Second League
- Season: 2017–18
- Champions: Belasica (East); Makedonija G.P. (West)
- Promoted: Belasica; Makedonija G.P.
- Relegated: Osogovo; Pobeda Valandovo; Turnovo; Gorno Lisiche; Lokomotiva; Zajazi; Novaci
- Matches: 252 (Total); 117 (East); 135 (West)
- Biggest home win: Belasica 6–0 Plachkovica; Sasa 7–1 Pobeda Valandovo; Plachkovica 8–2 Pobeda Valandovo
- Biggest away win: Pobeda Valandovo 0–12 Belasica
- Highest scoring: Pobeda Valandovo 1–12 Tikvesh
- Longest winning run: 10 games Makedonija G.P.
- Longest unbeaten run: 14 games Belasica
- Longest winless run: 19 games Novaci
- Longest losing run: 17 games Novaci

The 2017–18 Macedonian Second Football League was the 26th season of the Macedonian Second Football League, the second division in the Macedonian football league system. The fixtures were announced on 7 August 2017. The season began on 27 August 2017 and concluded on 19 May 2018. It's the first season since 1999–2000 with the new format, which as the league is divided into two groups, East and West, with 10 teams participating in each group.

== East ==
=== Participating teams ===
Location of teams in 2017–18 Macedonian Second League - East

Club	City	Stadium	Capacity
FK Belasica	Strumica	Stadion Mladost	6,500
FK Borec	Veles	Gradski stadion Veles	2,000
FK Bregalnica	Shtip	Gradski stadion Shtip	4,000
FK Kozhuf	Gevgelija	Gradski stadion Gevgelija	2,500
FK Osogovo	Kochani	Stadion Nikola Mantov	5,000
FK Plachkovica	Radovish	Gradski stadion Radovish	2,000
FK Pobeda	Valandovo	Gradski stadion Valandovo	500
FK Sasa	Makedonska Kamenica	Gradski stadion M. Kamenica	5,000
GFK Tikvesh	Kavadarci	Gradski Stadion Kavadarci	7,500
FK Horizont Turnovo	Turnovo	Stadion Kukush	1,500

=== League table ===
Pos	Team	Pld	W	D	L	GF	GA	GD	Pts	Promotion or relegation
1	Belasica (C, P)	25	18	5	2	81	11	+70	59	Promotion to Macedonian First League
2	Borec	25	16	5	4	43	15	+28	53 (Note: Head-to-head record: Borec 4 pts, Bregalnica 4 pts; away goals: Borec 2 goals, Bregalnica 1 goal.)	Qualification to Promotion play-off semi-finals
3	Bregalnica Shtip	25	15	8	2	54	20	+34	53	
4	Kozhuf	25	12	4	9	34	33	+1	40	
5	Tikvesh (Note: Tikvesh were one point because their U18 team got disqualified.)	25	12	2	11	45	43	+2	37	
6	Plachkovica	25	9	3	13	40	50	−10	30	
7	Sasa	25	7	4	14	32	42	−10	25	
8	Osogovo (R)	25	5	4	16	26	53	−27	19	Relegation to Macedonian Third League
9	Pobeda Valandovo (Note: Pobeda Valandovo were deducted one point because their U17 & U16 teams got disqualified.) (R)	25	2	5	18	25	95	−70	10	Relegation to Macedonian Third League
10	Horizont Turnovo (Note: Horizont Turnovo were expelled from the league for not paying participation fee for the league.) (R)	9	1	0	8	8	26	−18	3	Relegation to Macedonian Third League

Source: MacedonianFootball.com, Soccerway
Rules for classification: 1) Points; 2) Head-to-head points; 3) Head-to-head goal difference; 4) Head-to-head away goals scored
(C) Champions; (P) Promoted; (R) Relegated

=== Results ===
==== Matches 1–18 ====
Home \ Away	BEL	BOR	BRE	KOZ	OSO	PLA	PBD	SAS	TIK	TUR
Belasica	—	2–0	1–1	3–0	5–0	6–0	3–1	1–0	3–1	—
Borec	0–0	—	1–1	2–0	2–1	4–1	2–2	3–0	1–0	3–0 (Note: Matches awarded due to expulsion of Horizont Turnovo.)
Bregalnica Shtip	0–0	1–2	—	3–1	5–0	4–1	1–1	2–0	1–0	—
Kozhuf	2–1	0–0	4–1	—	2–1	1–1	2–0	1–1	3–0 (Note: Match was originally finished 1–1, but was awarded to Kozhuf because was Tikvesh not used enough number of youth players.)	3–0
Osogovo	0–0	1–2	2–2	1–0	—	2–1	4–0	2–2	0–4	1–3
Plachkovica	1–2	1–0	0–1	3–1	2–0	—	4–1	2–1	3–3	3–2
Pobeda Valandovo	1–8	0–0	1–1	1–2	3–0	0–2	—	1–1	1–3	—
Sasa	0–5	0–1	0–5	1–3	2–0	4–1	7–1	—	2–0	—
Tikvesh	0–4	2–0	2–3	1–0	2–1	1–0	1–0	2–1	—	—
Horizont Turnovo	0–2	—	1–3	—	—	—	0–3	0–3	2–5	—

Source: MacedonianFootball.com
Legend: Blue = home team win; Yellow = draw; Red = away team win.

==== Matches 19–27 ====
Home \ Away	BEL	BOR	BRE	KOZ	OSO	PLA	PBD	SAS	TIK
Belasica	—	—	1–1	6–0	5–0	3–0	—	—	—
Borec	3–0	—	—	2–0	1–0	3–0	—	—	—
Bregalnica Shtip	—	1–0	—	—	—	2–0	7–2	2–0	5–0
Kozhuf	—	—	0–1	—	—	1–0	2–0	2–1	1–1
Osogovo	—	—	0–0	1–2	—	—	—	1–0	—
Plachkovica	—	—	—	—	3–2	—	8–2	2–2	—
Pobeda Valandovo	0–12	0–5	—	—	3–5	—	—	—	1–12
Sasa	0–3	1–3	—	—	—	—	3–0	—	1–0
Tikvesh	0–5	1–3	—	—	2–1	2–1	—	—	—

Source: MacedonianFootball.com
Legend: Blue = home team win; Yellow = draw; Red = away team win.

== Top scorers East ==
As of May 2018

Rank	Player	Club	Goals
1	(North Macedonia) Pepi Gjorgiev	Belasica	16
2	(North Macedonia) Goran Zdravkov	Belasica	15
3	(North Macedonia) Riste Naumov	Bregalnica Štip	14
4	(North Macedonia) Gjorgji Gjorgjiev	Borec Veles	11
5	(North Macedonia) Martin Mirčevski	Belasica	10
5	(North Macedonia) Robert Mitev	Tikves	10
8	(North Macedonia) Vladimir Zoglev	Osogovo	9
8	(North Macedonia) Daniel Lazarovski	Kožuf	9
8	(North Macedonia) Mile Kostovski	Belasica	9

== West ==
=== Participating teams ===
Location of teams in 2017–18 Macedonian Second League - West

Club	City	Stadium	Capacity
FK Euromilk Gorno Lisiche	Skopje	Stadion Gorno Lisiche	500
FK Gostivar	Gostivar	Gradski stadion Gostivar	1,000
FK Labunishta	Labunishta	Stadion Kalishta	
FK Lokomotiva	Skopje	Lokomotiva Stadium	500
FK Makedonija G.P.	Skopje	Gjorche Petrov Stadium	3,000
FK Novaci	Novaci	Stadion Novaci	500
FK Struga	Struga	Stadion Gradska Plazha	500
FK Teteks	Tetovo	AMS Sportski Centar Tetovo	2,000
FK Velazerimi	Kichevo	Velazerimi Arena	3,000
FK Zajazi	Zajas	Gradski stadion Kichevo	5,000

=== League table ===
Pos	Team	Pld	W	D	L	GF	GA	GD	Pts	Promotion or relegation
1	Makedonija G.P. (C, P)	27	17	5	5	49	23	+26	56	Promotion to Macedonian First League
2	Gostivar	27	16	6	5	48	26	+22	54	Qualification to Promotion play-off semi-finals
3	Vëllazërimi 77	27	16	5	6	46	25	+21	53	
4	Struga	27	13	6	8	44	30	+14	45	
5	Labunishta	27	11	9	7	38	24	+14	42	
6	Teteks	27	12	3	12	40	42	−2	39	
7	Euromilk Gorno Lisiche (R)	27	10	5	12	32	46	−14	35	Relegation to Macedonian Third League
8	Lokomotiva (R)	27	6	8	13	30	41	−11	26	Relegation to Macedonian Third League
9	Zajazi (R)	27	4	5	18	24	62	−38	17	Relegation to Macedonian Third League
10	Novaci 2005 (Note: Novaci 2005 were deducted one point because their youth teams got disqualified.) (R)	27	2	4	21	22	54	−32	9	Relegation to Macedonian Third League

Source: MacedonianFootball.com, Soccerway
Rules for classification: 1) Points; 2) Head-to-head points; 3) Head-to-head goal difference; 4) Head-to-head away goals scored
(C) Champions; (P) Promoted; (R) Relegated

=== Results ===
==== Matches 1–18 ====
Home \ Away	EGL	GOS	LAB	LOK	MGP	NOV	STR	TET	VLZ	ZAJ
Euromilk Gorno Lisiche	—	1–0	1–1	2–1	2–1	2–1	2–2	3–1	0–0	2–1
Gostivar	3–2	—	0–0	1–0	0–2	4–1	1–0	2–1	1–2	3–0
Labunishta	3–0	2–0	—	1–0	1–1	1–0	0–0	1–0	1–1	2–0
Lokomotiva	2–1	1–1	3–0	—	0–1	3–0	1–1	0–0	2–0	0–0
Makedonija G.P.	3–0	2–2	1–1	4–1	—	1–0	3–0	5–1	0–2	1–0
Novaci 2005	2–0	1–2	0–2	1–1	1–1	—	0–1	1–2	0–3	6–1
Struga	1–0	1–1	2–0	1–1	2–0	3–1	—	1–0	4–2	5–1
Teteks	1–2	0–1	0–0	2–1	1–0	4–2	2–0	—	1–0	3–2
Vëllazërimi 77	3–1	0–1	1–1	1–1	1–2	2–1	1–0	3–1	—	1–0
Zajazi	0–3	1–3	1–0	2–0	0–0	1–0	1–1	1–0	1–2	—

Source: MacedonianFootball.com
Legend: Blue = home team win; Yellow = draw; Red = away team win.

==== Matches 19–27 ====
Home \ Away	EGL	GOS	LAB	LOK	MGP	NOV	STR	TET	VLZ	ZAJ
Euromilk Gorno Lisiche	—	—	—	3–1	—	0–0	—	2–1	—	1–1
Gostivar	4–0	—	—	2–1	3–0	2–0	4–2	—	—	—
Labunishta	3–1	1–1	—	2–1	—	4–1	—	—	—	—
Lokomotiva	—	—	—	—	0–3	2–0	1–5	2–2	—	—
Makedonija G.P.	4–0	—	3–2	—	—	—	—	2–1	2–0	3–1
Novaci 2005	—	—	—	—	0–2	—	0–1	2–3	—	1–1
Struga	3–1	—	1–0	—	1–2	—	—	2–3	—	4–1
Teteks	—	2–0	2–1	—	—	—	—	—	2–4	4–2
Vëllazërimi 77	3–0	2–2	2–1	2–0	—	5–0	1–0	—	—	—
Zajazi	—	1–4	1–7	3–4	—	—	—	—	0–1	—

Source: MacedonianFootball.com
Legend: Blue = home team win; Yellow = draw; Red = away team win.

== Promotion play-offs ==
=== Semi-final ===
28 May 2018
16:30 CEST

Gostivar	0–0	Borec
	Report
Penalties
Ademi (penalty missed); Bexheti (penalty scored); Esati (penalty scored); Grozdanoski (penalty scored); Osmani (penalty scored)	4–5	(penalty scored) Kocev; (penalty scored) Risteski; (penalty scored) Acevski; (penalty scored) Kudijan; (penalty scored) Gjorgjev

Training Centre Petar Miloshevski, Skopje
Referee: Marjan Markovski (Ohrid)

=== Final ===
2 June 2018
16:30 CEST

Pobeda	2–1	Borec
Ivanović 8'; Velkoski 29'	Report	Kudijan 56'

Stadion Mladost, Strumica
Referee: Dejan Jakimovski (Skopje)

== Top scorers West ==
As of May 2018

Rank	Player	Club	Goals
1	(North Macedonia) Ilirid Ademi	Gostivar	19
2	(North Macedonia) Bobi Bozhinovski	Makedonija G.P.	13
3	(North Macedonia) Blagojce Glavevski	Struga Trim Lum	12
4	(North Macedonia) Kristijan Kostovski	Makedonija G.P.	11
5	(North Macedonia) Murat Adili	Vеllazеrimi 77	10
6	(North Macedonia) Igor Kleckaroski	Teteks	9
7	(North Macedonia) Ivan Nastevski	Makedonija G.P.	8
7	(North Macedonia) Meriton Saliji	Teteks	8
7	(North Macedonia) Flamur Tairi	Struga Trim Lum	8

== See also ==
- 2017–18 Macedonian Football Cup
- 2017–18 Macedonian First Football League
- 2017–18 Macedonian Third Football League
