= 2020–21 Macedonian Second Football League =

Macedonian Second League
- Season: 2020–21

The 2020–21 Macedonian Second Football League is the 29th season of the Macedonian Second Football League, the second division in the Macedonian football league system. The season began on 22 August 2020 and concluded on 15 May 2021.

== East ==
=== Participating teams ===
Location of teams in 2019–20 Macedonian Second League - East

Club	City	Stadium	Capacity
Bregalnica	Štip	Gradski stadion Shtip	4,000
Pehchevo	Pehchevo	Gradski stadion Pehchevo	1,200
Kozhuf	Gevgelija	Gradski stadion Gevgelija	1,400
Osogovo	Kochani	Stadion Nikola Mantov	4,350
Plachkovica	Radovish	Gradski stadion Radovish	2,000
Pobeda	Prilep	AMS Mogila	
Rosoman 83	Rosoman	Stadion Rosoman	
Sasa	Makedonska Kamenica	Gradski stadion M. Kamenica	5,000
Sloga 1934	Vinica	Gradski stadion Vinica	3,000
Tikvesh	Kavadarci	Gradski Stadion Kavadarci	7,500

=== League table ===
Pos	Team	Pld	W	D	L	GF	GA	GD	Pts	Promotion or relegation
1	Bregalnica (C, P)	27	23	4	0	73	18	+55	73	Promotion to Macedonian First League
2	Tikvesh (P)	27	18	7	2	59	23	+36	61	Promotion to Macedonian First League
3	Pehchevo	27	12	6	9	41	33	+8	42	
4	Sloga 1934	27	9	9	9	33	34	−1	36	
5	Kozhuf	27	9	9	9	29	35	−6	36	
6	Sasa	27	9	8	10	35	32	+3	35	
7	Osogovo	27	7	8	12	32	43	−11	29	
8	Pobeda	27	6	9	12	30	35	−5	27	
9	Plachkovica (R)	27	5	7	15	20	42	−22	22	Relegation to Macedonian Third League
10	Rosoman 83 (R)	27	2	3	22	26	83	−57	9	Relegation to Macedonian Third League

Source: MacedonianFootball.com
Rules for classification: 1) Points; 2) Head-to-head points; 3) Head-to-head goal difference; 4) Head-to-head away goals scored
(C) Champions; (P) Promoted; (R) Relegated

=== Results ===
==== Matches 1–18 ====
Home \ Away	BRE	PEH	KOZ	OSO	PLA	POB	ROS	SAS	SLO	TIK
Bregalnica Shtip	—	2–0	3–0	1–1	3–1	2–1	6–1	3–0	6–1	1–1
Pehchevo	0–1	—	3–0	3–3	5–1	1–0	3–0	0–0	1–1	0–3
Kozhuf	1–2	2–1	—	2–0	0–0	2–1	3–2	1–1	0–0	1–1
Osogovo	1–3	1–0	0–0	—	1–1	2–0	5–4	1–1	1–1	0–3
Plachkovica	1–3	0–1	1–1	0–1	—	0–0	3–0	1–1	0–1	0–1
Pobeda	1–2	4–1	1–2	1–1	0–0	—	3–0	2–2	1–1	0–0
Rosoman 83	1–5	2–2	1–2	1–7	0–1	1–2	—	3–2	2–1	0–4
Sasa	0–1	2–3	3–1	0–0	1–0	1–0	5–0	—	2–0	1–2
Sloga 1934	1–3	0–2	1–1	3–0	3–0	2–0	1–1	2–1	—	1–3
Tikvesh	1–1	1–4	1–1	3–1	5–1	3–0	3–0	3–0	4–2	—

Source: MacedonianFootball.com
Legend: Blue = home team win; Yellow = draw; Red = away team win.

==== Matches 19–27 ====
Home \ Away	BRE	PEH	KOZ	OSO	PLA	POB	ROS	SAS	SLO	TIK
Bregalnica Shtip	—	—	3–0	—	—	3–1	5–1	1–1	—	5–0
Pehchevo	1–2	—	1–0	—	—	2–2	2–1	1–1	—	—
Kozhuf	—	—	—	0–1	2–1	—	—	1–0	0–2	0–2
Osogovo	0–2	0–1	—	—	—	0–1	4–1	0–2	—	—
Plachkovica	0–2	0–2	—	2–0	—	1–3	—	—	—	—
Pobeda	—	—	2–2	—	—	—	3–1	—	0–0	0–1
Rosoman 83	—	—	1–4	—	0–1	—	—	—	1–2	1–1
Sasa	—	—	—	—	1–2	2–1	3–0	—	1–0	—
Sloga 1934	1–2	1–0	—	4–1	1–1	—	—	—	—	—
Tikvesh	—	3–1	—	3–0	4–1	—	—	3–1	0–0	—

Source: MacedonianFootball.com
Legend: Blue = home team win; Yellow = draw; Red = away team win.

=== Position by round ===
Team ╲ Round	1	2	3	4	5	6	7	8	9	10	11	12	13	14	15	16	17	18	19	20	21	22	23	24	25	26	27
Bregalnica	4	2	1	2	2	2	2	2	2	2	1	1	1	1	1	1	1	1	1	1	1	1	1	1	1	1	1
Tikvesh	5	4	2	1	1	1	1	1	1	1	2	2	2	2	2	2	2	2	2	2	2	2	2	2	2	2	2
Pehchevo	10	8	8	9	7	8	5	4	6	5	6	5	4	5	5	4	4	3	3	3	3	3	3	3	3	3	3
Sloga 1934	6	5	4	4	4	5	6	5	4	4	5	4	5	4	4	6	7	7	7	7	7	7	7	7	6	5	4
Kozhuf	2	3	5	6	3	3	3	3	3	3	3	3	3	3	3	3	3	4	4	4	4	4	4	4	4	4	5
Sasa	8	9	7	7	9	7	7	7	8	8	8	8	6	6	6	5	5	6	6	6	6	6	5	5	5	6	6
Osogovo	9	7	9	8	10	10	8	8	5	6	4	6	8	8	7	7	6	5	5	5	5	5	6	6	7	7	7
Pobeda	1	1	3	3	5	4	4	6	7	7	7	7	7	7	8	8	8	8	8	8	8	8	8	8	8	8	8
Plachkovica	7	10	10	10	8	9	10	10	10	10	10	10	10	9	9	9	9	9	9	9	9	9	9	9	9	9	9
Rosoman 83	3	6	6	5	6	6	9	9	9	9	9	9	9	10	10	10	10	10	10	10	10	10	10	10	10	10	10

Leader and promotion to the Macedonian First League
Qualification for the Promotion play-off semi-finals
Possible relegation to the Macedonian Third League
Relegation to the Macedonian Third League

Source: MacedonianFootball.com

=== Top scorers ===
As of 15 May 2021

Rank	Player	Club	Goals
1	(North Macedonia) Simeon Hristov	Tikvesh	15
2	(North Macedonia) Martin Stojanov	Bregalnica	13
3	(North Macedonia) Darko Dodev	Bregalnica	11
3	(North Macedonia) Sasho Dukov	Rosoman 83 & Sasa	11
3	(North Macedonia) Riste Naumov	Bregalnica	11

== West ==
=== Participating teams ===
Location of teams in 2019–20 Macedonian Second League - West

Club	City	Stadium	Capacity
Drita	Bogovinje	Stadion Bogovinje	500
Gostivar	Gostivar	Gradski stadion Gostivar	1,000
Kadino	Kadino	Stadion Kadino	500
Korab	Debar	Gradski stadion Debar	2,500
Ohrid	Ohrid	SRC Biljanini Izvori	3,000
Skopje	Skopje	Stadion Zhelezarnica	3,000
Teteks	Tetovo	AMS Sportski Centar Tetovo	2,000
Vardar Forino	Forino	Gradski stadion Gostivar	1,000
Veleshta	Veleshta	Stadion Veleshta	
Vëllazërimi	Kichevo	Velazerimi Arena	3,000

=== League table ===
Pos	Team	Pld	W	D	L	GF	GA	GD	Pts	Promotion or relegation
1	Skopje (C, P)	26	18	6	2	50	20	+30	60	Promotion to Macedonian First League
2	Ohrid	26	13	7	6	26	13	+13	46	
3	Veleshta	26	13	7	6	32	23	+9	46	
4	Gostivar	26	12	7	7	33	30	+3	43	
5	Korab	26	10	6	10	28	27	+1	36	
6	Kadino	26	7	7	12	24	24	0	28	
7	Teteks	26	8	3	15	19	34	−15	27	
8	Vëllazërimi (R)	26	7	6	13	26	34	−8	27	Relegation to Macedonian Third League
9	Drita (R)	26	4	9	13	28	41	−13	21	Relegation to Macedonian Third League
10	Vardar Forino (Note: Vardar Forino were deducted three points because they did not show up to the game against Vëllazërimi.) (R)	18	3	4	11	15	35	−20	10	Relegation to Macedonian Third League

Source: MacedonianFootball.com
Rules for classification: 1) Points; 2) Head-to-head points; 3) Head-to-head goal difference; 4) Head-to-head away goals scored
(C) Champions; (P) Promoted; (R) Relegated

=== Results ===
==== Matches 1–18 ====
Home \ Away	DRI	GOS	KAD	KOR	OHR	SKO	TET	VFO	VEL	VLZ
Drita	—	1–3	1–1	1–1	0–0	0–0	0–0	1–1	0–1	3–0
Gostivar	2–1	—	0–3	1–0	0–0	2–0	3–0	1–0	1–1	1–0
Kadino	2–1	3–0	—	0–1	1–0	0–1	0–0	1–1	0–0	0–1
Korab	2–3	1–1	2–0	—	1–0	0–0	1–0	0–1	0–1	2–1
Ohrid	5–0	1–0	2–1	2–0	—	0–1	1–0	1–0	2–1	1–0
Skopje	2–1	4–0	1–0	1–0	2–1	—	1–0	6–0	1–1	4–2
Teteks	2–0	1–3	1–0	0–2	0–0	1–2	—	3–1	2–3	1–2
Vardar Forino	0–0	0–3	0–4	0–1	0–1	3–3	5–0	—	3–2	0–3
Veleshta	1–0	2–1	1–0	1–1	0–0	0–0	2–0	3–0	—	2–1
Vëllazërimi	3–2	0–1	1–0	2–0	0–0	1–3	0–2	2–0	0–0	—

Source: MacedonianFootball.com
Legend: Blue = home team win; Yellow = draw; Red = away team win.

==== Matches 19–26 ====
Home \ Away	DRI	GOS	KAD	KOR	OHR	SKO	TET	VEL	VLZ
Drita	—	2–2	—	3–4	—	3–2	1–0	—	—
Gostivar	—	—	—	—	1–1	2–4	1–0	—	1–1
Kadino	2–1	2–2	—	3–0	—	0–0	—	—	—
Korab	—	2–0	—	—	—	1–2	3–0	—	0–0
Ohrid	1–0	—	3–0	1–1	—	—	—	1–0	2–1
Skopje	—	—	—	—	2–0	—	2–1	3–0	3–1
Teteks	—	—	1–0	—	1–0	—	—	2–1	—
Veleshta	2–1	0–1	2–0	3–2	—	—	—	—	2–1
Vëllazërimi	2–2	—	1–1	—	—	—	0–1	—	—

Source: MacedonianFootball.com
Legend: Blue = home team win; Yellow = draw; Red = away team win.

=== Position by round ===
Team ╲ Round	1	2	3	4	5	6	7	8	9	10	11	12	13	14	15	16	17	18	19	20	21	22	23	24	25	26	27
Skopje	1	3	1	1	1	2	2	3	2	1	1	1	1	1	1	1	1	1	1	1	1	1	1	1	1	1	1
Ohrid	6	4	5	6	7	6	7	7	7	5	5	4	6	4	4	4	3	4	4	4	4	3	3	2	2	2	2
Veleshta	3	5	4	3	3	3	3	2	3	4	3	3	3	3	2	2	4	2	2	2	2	2	2	3	3	3	3
Gostivar	7	2	2	2	2	1	1	1	1	2	2	2	2	2	3	3	2	3	3	3	3	4	4	4	4	4	4
Korab	2	1	3	4	4	4	4	4	4	3	4	6	5	6	5	5	5	5	5	5	5	5	5	5	5	5	5
Kadino	8	6	7	8	6	7	6	6	6	6	7	7	7	7	7	7	7	7	7	7	7	7	7	7	6	6	6
Teteks	10	10	10	9	9	9	10	9	9	9	10	10	10	10	9	8	8	8	8	8	8	8	8	8	8	8	7
Vëllazërimi	9	9	6	5	5	5	5	5	5	7	6	5	4	5	6	6	6	6	6	6	6	6	6	6	7	7	8
Drita	5	8	8	10	10	10	9	10	10	10	9	9	9	9	10	9	9	9	9	9	9	9	9	9	9	9	9
Vardar Forino	4	7	9	7	8	8	8	8	8	8	8	8	8	8	8	10	10	10	10	10	10	10	10	10	10	10	10

Leader and promotion to the Macedonian First League
Qualification for the Promotion play-off semi-finals
Possible relegation to the Macedonian Third League
Relegation to the Macedonian Third League

Source: MacedonianFootball.com

=== Top scorers ===
As of 15 May 2021

Rank	Player	Club	Goals
1	(North Macedonia) Hristijan Kirovski	Gostivar & Skopje	15
2	(North Macedonia) Elmir Aliji	Drita	11
2	(North Macedonia) Altin Loga	Veleshta	11
4	(North Macedonia) Vladimir Zhoglev	Skopje	9
5	(North Macedonia) Albulen Imeri	Vëllazërimi	8
5	(North Macedonia) Sherif Rexhepi	Ohrid	8

== See also ==
- 2020–21 Macedonian Football Cup
- 2020–21 Macedonian First Football League
