= 2020–21 Macedonian First Football League =

Macedonian First Football League
- Season: 2020–21
- Dates: 8 August 2020 – 16 May 2021
- Champions: Shkëndija; 4th domestic title
- Relegated: Sileks; Vardar; Belasica
- Champions League: Shkëndija
- Europa Conference League: Shkupi; Struga; Sileks
- Matches played: 198
- Goals scored: 485 (2.45 per match)
- Top goalscorer: Besart Ibraimi (24 goals)
- Biggest home win: Sileks 6–0 Vardar (11 April 2021)
- Biggest away win: Belasica 0–6 Sileks (9 August 2020)
- Highest scoring: Rabotnichki 3–5 Shkëndija (28 April 2021)
- Longest winning run: 8 games Shkëndija
- Longest unbeaten run: 17 games Shkëndija
- Longest winless run: 10 games Belasica; Pelister; Vardar
- Longest losing run: 7 games Belasica
- All statistics correct as of 16 May 2021.

The 2020–21 Macedonian First League was the 29th season of the Macedonian First Football League, the highest football league of North Macedonia. It began on 8 August 2020 and ended on 16 May 2021. Vardar were the defending champions, having won their eleventh title in 2019–20 after was season abandoned due to the COVID-19 pandemic. They were the third defending champions to be relegated as defending champions.

== Promotion and relegation ==
At the end of the 2019–20 season

Promoted from 2019–20 Second League

- Belasica (First placed; East)
- Pelister (First placed; West)

Relegated to 2020–21 Second League

- None relegated

At the end of the 2020–21 season

Promoted from 2020–21 Second League

- Bregalnica Shtip (First placed; East)
- Skopje (First placed; West)
- Tikvesh (Second placed; East; won play-off)

Relegated to 2021–22 Second League

- Sileks (9th; lost play-off)
- Vardar (11th)
- Belasica (12th)

== Participating teams ==
Location of teams in 2020–21 Macedonian First League

Akademija Pandev Belasica	Borec	Makedonija G.P.	Pelister	Rabotnički Vardar
Blagoj Istatov Stadium; UEFA	Zoran Paunov Stadium	Gjorče Petrov Stadium	Tumbe Kafe Stadium	Toše Proeski Arena; UEFA
Capacity: 9,200	Capacity: 2,000	Capacity: 3,000	Capacity: 9,100	Capacity: 36,460
Renova Shkëndija	Shkupi	Sileks	Struga	
Tetovo Stadium	Park Stadium	City Stadium Kratovo	Gradska Plaža Stadium	
Capacity: 15,000	Capacity: 6,000	Capacity: 4,800	Capacity: 2,500	

=== Personnel and kits ===
Note: Flags indicate national team as has been defined under FIFA eligibility rules. Players may hold more than one non-FIFA nationality.

Team	Manager	Captain	Kit manufacturer	Shirt sponsor
Akademija Pandev	(North Macedonia) Aleksandar Vasoski	(North Macedonia) Sashko Pandev	(Italy) Sportika SA	Strumka, JOXX, Elenica
Belasica	(North Macedonia) Gjore Jovanovski	(North Macedonia) Aleksandar Milushev	(Italy) Sportika SA	Pinda Shop
Borec	(North Macedonia) Borche Hristov	(North Macedonia) Trajche Trajkov	(Italy) Legea	Brako
Makedonija G.P.	(North Macedonia) Zhikica Tasevski	(North Macedonia) Bobi Bozhinovski	(Italy) Givova	betinasia, Tesla
Pelister	(North Macedonia) Dimitar Kapinkovski	(North Macedonia) Hristijan Dragarski	(Italy) Legea	SN Broker
Rabotnički	(North Macedonia) Aleksandar Vlaho	(North Macedonia) Goran Siljanovski	(Spain) Joma	Seavus
Renova	(North Macedonia) Qatip Osmani	(North Macedonia) Argjent Gafuri	(Germany) Jako	Renova
Shkëndija	(Albania) Ernest Gjoka	(North Macedonia) Egzon Bejtulai	(Italy) Macron	Ecolog
Shkupi	(North Macedonia) Goce Sedloski	(North Macedonia) Besar Iseni	(Serbia) Sunrise	-
Sileks	(Serbia) Goran Simov	(North Macedonia) Angelche Timovski	(Serbia) Sunrise	-
Struga	(North Macedonia) Srgjan Zaharievski	(North Macedonia) Flamur Tairi	(Germany) Adidas	Trim & Lum
Vardar	(North Macedonia) Nikola Ilievski	(North Macedonia) Dejan Blazhevski	(Denmark) Hummel	Komiti Skopje

== League table ==
Pos	Team	Pld	W	D	L	GF	GA	GD	Pts	Qualification or relegation
1	Shkëndija (C)	33	22	9	2	69	26	+43	75	Qualification for the Champions League first qualifying round
2	Shkupi	33	16	11	6	41	24	+17	59	Qualification for the Europa Conference League first qualifying round
3	Struga	33	15	12	6	39	24	+15	57	Qualification for the Europa Conference League first qualifying round
4	Makedonija G.P.	33	16	7	10	53	43	+10	55	
5	Rabotnički	33	11	15	7	45	39	+6	48	
6	Pelister	33	12	9	12	34	38	−4	45	
7	Akademija Pandev	33	12	5	16	32	36	−4	41	
8	Borec	33	11	7	15	32	36	−4	40	
9	Sileks (R)	33	10	6	17	49	45	+4	36	Qualification for the Europa Conference League first qualifying round and relegation play-off (Note: Sileks qualified for the Europa Conference League first qualifying round by winning the 2020–21 Macedonian Football Cup.)
10	Renova (O)	33	8	12	13	36	46	−10	36	Qualification for the relegation play-off
11	Vardar (R)	33	7	10	16	32	60	−28	31	Relegation to the Macedonian Second League
12	Belasica (R)	33	4	5	24	23	68	−45	17	Relegation to the Macedonian Second League

Source: MacedonianFootball.com
Rules for classification: 1) Points; 2) Goal difference; 3) Goals scored; 4) Head-to-head points; 5) Head-to-head goal difference; 6) Head-to-head away goals scored (only if two teams); 7) Head-to-head goals scored; 8) Draw; 9) Play-off. (Note: Criteria 2, 3 and 8 is only used if not deciding Champion, teams for UEFA competitions or relegation).
(C) Champions; (O) Play-off winners; (R) Relegated

== Results ==
Every team will play three times against each other team for a total of 33 matches. The first 22 matchdays will consist of a regular double round-robin schedule. The league standings at this point will then be used to determine the games for the last 11 matchdays.

Home \ Away	AKP	BEL	BOR	MGP	PEL	RAB	REN	SKË	SKU	SIL	STR	VAR	AKP	BEL	BOR	MGP	PEL	RAB	REN	SKË	SKU	SIL	STR	VAR
Akademija Pandev	—	1–2	2–1	2–1	3–2	0–1	0–1	0–1	0–1	1–0	1–0	0–1	—	—	3–1	—	—	—	1–1	—	0–1	—	1–0	3–0
Belasica	0–0	—	2–2	1–3	0–2	2–2	1–1	0–3	0–2	0–6	1–2	0–3	0–2	—	—	0–2	—	1–1	—	0–3	—	1–3	—	—
Borec	2–0	2–1	—	2–1	3–0	0–0	1–1	0–2	0–1	2–0	2–1	0–2	—	1–0	—	—	0–0	—	2–0	—	0–1	—	0–1	2–0
Makedonija G.P.	3–1	2–1	0–0	—	2–1	2–1	2–3	0–1	0–0	1–0	2–0	2–1	1–2	—	2–1	—	3–0	—	—	3–4	—	0–3	2–3	—
Pelister	1–0	1–0	1–0	0–0	—	0–0	3–1	1–3	1–3	1–2	1–1	1–1	3–1	2–0	—	—	—	—	1–0	—	—	3–2	—	2–0
Rabotnički	0–0	2–0	2–1	1–3	1–0	—	3–1	0–0	2–2	1–1	1–1	1–1	0–2	—	2–1	2–2	3–1	—	—	3–5	—	3–1	—	—
Renova	2–0	2–4	1–0	1–3	0–0	0–1	—	1–3	0–0	0–0	0–0	3–0	—	3–1	—	1–2	—	1–1	—	0–3	—	2–1	—	—
Shkëndija	2–1	2–0	1–1	5–0	0–1	1–1	0–0	—	1–1	1–1	2–0	2–1	1–0	—	3–1	—	1–0	—	—	—	1–1	2–1	0–2	—
Shkupi	0–0	3–1	3–0	3–1	1–0	0–2	4–3	2–2	—	1–0	1–2	1–1	—	0–1	—	0–0	0–0	2–0	1–2	—	—	—	—	2–0
Sileks	1–2	0–1	1–2	0–3	2–2	4–3	3–1	1–2	0–1	—	0–0	1–0	3–2	—	1–1	—	—	—	—	—	1–3	—	0–1	6–0
Struga	1–1	3–0	1–0	1–1	0–1	2–1	1–0	1–1	2–0	2–0	—	2–2	—	3–1	—	—	3–0	1–1	0–0	—	0–0	—	—	1–0
Vardar	2–0	3–1	0–1	2–2	2–2	0–0	3–3	1–5	1–0	0–4	1–1	—	—	1–0	—	0–2	—	1–3	1–1	1–6	—	—	—	—

Source: MacedonianFootball.com
Legend: Blue = home team win; Yellow = draw; Red = away team win.

=== Positions by round ===
The table lists the positions of teams after each week of matches. In order to preserve chronological evolvements, any postponed matches are not included to the round at which they were originally scheduled, but added to the full round they were played immediately afterwards.

Team ╲ Round	1	2	3	4	5	6	7	8	9	10	11	12	13	14	15	16	17	18	19	20	21	22	23	24	25	26	27	28	29	30	31	32	33
Shkëndija	5	3	2	3	1	1	1	1	1	1	1	1	1	1	1	1	1	1	1	1	1	1	1	1	1	1	1	1	1	1	1	1	1
Shkupi	6	2	3	2	3	2	2	2	2	2	2	3	3	2	2	2	2	2	2	2	2	2	2	2	2	2	2	2	2	2	2	2	2
Struga	8	10	7	9	6	8	5	5	5	5	5	4	4	6	6	5	4	4	4	4	4	4	4	4	4	4	4	4	4	4	4	3	3
Makedonija G.P.	2	7	9	4	7	5	3	3	3	3	3	2	2	3	3	3	3	3	3	3	3	3	3	3	3	3	3	3	3	3	3	4	4
Rabotnički	9	8	6	7	4	6	7	7	9	9	8	8	8	8	8	7	8	7	5	5	5	5	5	5	5	5	5	5	5	5	5	5	5
Pelister	4	4	5	8	9	7	9	9	8	8	9	9	9	10	10	11	10	10	9	9	8	7	7	7	7	7	6	6	6	6	6	6	6
Akademija Pandev	11	11	11	11	11	11	10	10	11	11	11	10	11	11	11	10	11	11	11	11	11	11	10	8	8	8	8	7	7	9	10	8	7
Borec	3	5	8	6	5	3	4	4	4	4	4	5	6	4	4	6	5	6	7	7	6	6	6	6	6	6	7	8	8	7	7	7	8
Sileks	1	1	1	1	2	4	6	6	6	6	6	7	7	5	5	4	6	8	8	8	9	9	9	10	11	9	9	10	8	8	8	9	9
Renova	7	9	4	5	10	10	11	11	10	10	10	11	10	9	9	9	9	9	10	10	10	10	11	11	9	10	10	9	10	10	9	10	10
Vardar	10	6	10	10	8	9	8	8	7	7	7	6	5	7	7	8	7	5	6	6	7	8	8	9	10	11	11	11	11	11	11	11	11
Belasica	12	12	12	12	12	12	12	12	12	12	12	12	12	12	12	12	12	12	12	12	12	12	12	12	12	12	12	12	12	12	12	12	12

Leader and qualification for the Champions League first qualifying round
Qualification for the Europa Conference League first qualifying round
Qualification for the Relegation play-off
Relegation to the Macedonian Second League

Source: macedonianfootball.com

== Relegation play-offs ==
25 May 2021
16:00 CEST

Renova	2–2	Ohrid
Shefiti 19', 89'	Report	Trpeski 5'; Mitev 50'
Penalties
Mishkovski (penalty missed); Ramadani (penalty scored); Stojchevski (penalty scored); Shefiti (penalty scored)	3–2	(penalty scored) Mazari; (penalty scored) Gjorgjieski; (penalty missed) Trpeski; (penalty missed) Naumovski; (penalty missed) Veljanoski

Petar Miloshevski Training Centre, Skopje
Attendance: 0
Referee: Marjan Eckoski (Ohrid)

25 May 2021
16:00 CEST

Tikvesh	1–0	Sileks
Spahiu 54'	Report

Toshe Proeski Arena, Skopje
Attendance: 0
Referee: Aleksandar Grujoski (Kichevo)

== Season statistics ==
=== Top scorers ===
As of 16 May 2021

Rank	Player	Club	Goals
1	(North Macedonia) Besart Ibraimi	Shkëndija	24
2	(The Gambia) Dembo Darboe	Shkupi	16
3	(North Macedonia) Pepi Gorgiev	Sileks	13
4	(North Macedonia) Fahrudin Gjurgjevikj	Rabotnichki	12
5	(Serbia) Denis Ristov	Sileks	9
6	(Ghana) Basit Abdul Khalid	Makedonija G.P.	8
6	(North Macedonia) Bobi Bozhinovski	Makedonija G.P.	8
6	(North Macedonia) Matej Cvetanoski	Vardar & Shkupi	8
6	(North Macedonia) Ivan Ivanovski	Sileks	8
6	(North Macedonia) Alen Jasharoski	Renova	8
6	(North Macedonia) Antonio Kalanoski	Belasica	8
6	(North Macedonia) Martin Mirčevski	Belasica & Vardar	8
6	(North Macedonia) Remzifaik Selmani	Renova	8
6	(Albania) Shefit Shefiti	Renova	8
6	(North Macedonia) Luka Stankovski	Rabotnichki	8

== See also ==
- 2020–21 Macedonian Football Cup
- 2020–21 Macedonian Second Football League
