= 2019–20 Macedonian First Football League =

Macedonian First League
- Season: 2019–20
- Dates: 11 August 2019 – 11 March 2020
- Champions: Vardar; 11th Macedonian title
- Relegated: No relegation
- Champions League: Sileks
- Europa League: Shkëndija; Renova; Shkupi
- Matches: 115
- Goals: 252 (2.19 per match)
- Top goalscorer: Daniel Avramovski (10 goals)
- Biggest home win: Shkëndija 6–1 Renova (24 November 2019)
- Biggest away win: Akademija Pandev 0–3 Vardar (1 December 2019)
- Highest scoring: Sileks 3–4 Makedonija G.P. (31 August 2019); Shkëndija 6–1 Renova (24 November 2019); Renova 4–3 Rabotnički (8 December 2019)
- Longest winning run: 6 games Vardar
- Longest unbeaten run: 12 games Vardar; Sileks
- Longest winless run: 12 games Akademija Pandev
- Longest losing run: 5 games Akademija Pandev
- All statistics correct as of 11 March 2020.

The 2019–20 Macedonian First League was the 28th season of the Macedonian First Football League, the highest football league of North Macedonia. It began on 11 August 2019 and was scheduled to be end in July 2020. Each team will play the other sides four times on home-away basis, for a total of 36 matches. Shkëndija are the defending champions, having won their third title in 2018–19.

On 4 June 2020, the Football Federation of North Macedonia announced that the competition was abandoned due to the increasing number of COVID-19 cases in North Macedonia. Vardar was awarded the title, but no teams were relegated. The teams playing in Europe will be decided once the teams which successfully obtain a UEFA licence are known.

== Promotion and relegation ==
At the end of the 2018–19 season

Promoted from 2018–19 Second League

- Borec (Winners; East)
- Struga (Winners; West)

Relegated to 2019–20 Second League

- Belasica (9th)
- Pobeda (10th)

At the end of the 2019–20 season

Promoted from 2019–20 Second League

- Belasica (First placed; East)
- Pelister (First placed; West)

Relegated to 2020–21 Second League

- None relegated

== Participating teams ==
Location of teams in 2019–20 Macedonian First League

Akademija Pandev	Borec	Makedonija G.P.	Rabotnički Vardar
Blagoj Istatov Stadium	Zoran Paunov Stadium	Gjorče Petrov Stadium	Toše Proeski Arena; UEFA
Capacity: 9,200	Capacity: 2,000	Capacity: 3,000	Capacity: 36,460
Renova Shkëndija	Shkupi	Sileks	Struga
Ecolog Arena	Chair Stadium	City Stadium Kratovo	Gradska Plaža Stadium
Capacity: 15,000	Capacity: 6,000	Capacity: 4,800	Capacity: 2,500

=== Personnel and kits ===
Note: Flags indicate national team as has been defined under FIFA eligibility rules. Players may hold more than one non-FIFA nationality.

Team	Manager	Captain	Kit manufacturer	Shirt sponsor
Akademija Pandev	(North Macedonia) Jugoslav Trenchovski	(North Macedonia) Sashko Pandev	Givova	
Borec	(North Macedonia) Gorazd Mihajlov	(North Macedonia) Trajche Stojkovski	Legea	
Makedonija G.P.	(North Macedonia) Aleksandar Tanevski	(North Macedonia) Bobi Bozhinovski	Kappa	Evropa
Rabotnički	(Serbia) Ratko Dostanić	(North Macedonia) Goran Siljanovski	Joma	Seavus
Renova	(North Macedonia) Bujar Islami	(North Macedonia) Argjent Gafuri	Jako	Renova
Shkëndija	(Albania) Ernest Gjoka	(North Macedonia) Besart Ibraimi	Macron	Ecolog
Shkupi	(North Macedonia) Qatip Osmani	(North Macedonia) Muharem Bajrami	Kappa	ATS Group
Sileks	(Serbia) Goran Simov	(North Macedonia) Angelche Timovski	Legea	
Struga	(North Macedonia) Jeton Beqiri	(North Macedonia) Flamur Tairi	Adidas	Trim & Lum
Vardar	(North Macedonia) Aleksandar Vasoski	(North Macedonia) Filip Gačevski	Hummel	BetCity

== League table ==
Pos	Team	Pld	W	D	L	GF	GA	GD	Pts	Qualification
1	Vardar (C)	23	13	7	3	33	14	+19	46	Excluded from European competitions (Note: Vardar failed to get the UEFA license for the competition due to financial problems.)
2	Sileks	23	10	6	7	24	21	+3	36	Qualification for the Champions League first qualifying round
3	Shkëndija	23	10	5	8	38	20	+18	35	Qualification for the Europa League first qualifying round
4	Renova	23	9	4	10	25	33	−8	31	Qualification for the Europa League first qualifying round
5	Shkupi	23	7	8	8	28	28	0	29	Qualification for the Europa League first qualifying round
6	Makedonija G.P.	23	7	8	8	24	28	−4	29	
7	Akademija Pandev	23	7	7	9	20	20	0	28	
8	Rabotnički	23	8	4	11	21	29	−8	28	
9	Borec	23	7	6	10	20	31	−11	27	
10	Struga	23	6	7	10	19	28	−9	25	

Source: MacedonianFootball.com, Soccerway
Rules for classification: 1) Points; 2) Goal difference; 3) Goals scored; 4) Head-to-head points; 5) Head-to-head goal difference; 6) Head-to-head away goals scored (only if two teams); 7) Head-to-head goals scored; 8) Draw; 9) Play-off. (Note: Criteria 2, 3 and 8 is only used if not deciding Champion, teams for UEFA competitions or relegation).
(C) Champions

== Results ==
Home \ Away	AKA	BOR	MGP	RAB	REN	SKE	SKU	SIL	STR	VAR	AKA	BOR	MGP	RAB	REN	SKE	SKU	SIL	STR	VAR
Akademija Pandev	—	2–0	3–0	1–1	2–0	1–0	0–0	2–0	1–1	0–3	—	0–0	—	—	0–1	1–2	—	—	—	—
Borec	1–0	—	1–1	1–1	1–1	1–0	2–1	0–0	3–2	0–0	—	—	—	—	—	4–2	—	—	—	0–1
Makedonija G.P.	0–0	3–1	—	2–0	0–1	0–0	0–0	0–1	1–1	1–1	1–0	0–2	—	—	—	—	—	—	—	—
Rabotnički	1–2	2–1	1–0	—	1–0	1–2	2–0	1–1	1–2	0–2	1–0	—	—	—	—	—	2–1	—	—	—
Renova	1–1	2–1	1–1	4–3	—	0–2	2–2	1–0	2–1	0–1	—	—	—	—	—	—	—	0–1	2–0	2–0
Shkëndija	1–0	4–0	1–1	3–0	6–1	—	4–0	3–0	2–0	0–0	—	—	4–1	—	—	—	—	—	—	—
Shkupi	3–1	2–0	2–3	2–0	2–1	2–0	—	1–0	0–0	1–2	—	2–0	—	0–1	2–3	—	—	1–1	—	—
Sileks	3–1	3–0	3–4	1–0	3–0	1–0	1–0	—	1–0	2–2	—	—	1–0	—	—	0–0	—	—	—	—
Struga	0–0	1–1	0–2	2–1	1–0	2–1	1–1	2–1	—	2–1	—	—	—	0–1	—	—	1–2	0–0	—	—
Vardar	1–0	2–0	0–2	2–0	2–0	2–2	1–1	3–0	3–0	—	—	—	3–1	0–0	—	—	—	—	1–0	—

Source: MacedonianFootball.com
Legend: Blue = home team win; Yellow = draw; Red = away team win.

=== Positions by round ===
The table lists the positions of teams after each week of matches. In order to preserve chronological evolvements, any postponed matches are not included to the round at which they were originally scheduled, but added to the full round they were played immediately afterwards.

Team ╲ Round	1	2	3	4	5	6	7	8	9	10	11	12	13	14	15	16	17	18	19	20	21	22	23
Vardar	10	9	6	5	3	2	1	1	1	1	2	1	1	1	1	1	1	1	1	1	1	1	1
Sileks	8	7	8	8	9	8	9	7	8	6	8	6	5	4	4	4	4	4	3	3	3	3	2
Shkëndija	7	10	9	10	7	6	4	6	6	7	5	5	3	3	3	3	2	2	2	2	2	2	3
Renova	5	1	2	4	5	7	5	4	5	5	7	8	8	8	9	8	9	9	9	8	8	6	4
Shkupi	2	6	5	6	4	4	6	5	4	4	3	3	4	5	6	5	7	7	6	6	6	5	5
Makedonija G.P.	1	2	4	2	2	3	3	3	3	3	4	4	6	6	5	6	5	5	5	4	4	4	6
Akademija Pandev	4	3	1	1	1	1	2	2	2	2	1	2	2	2	2	2	3	3	4	5	5	7	7
Rabotnički	6	4	7	9	10	9	8	9	7	10	10	10	10	10	10	10	10	10	10	9	9	9	8
Borec	9	8	10	7	8	10	10	10	10	9	9	9	9	9	8	9	8	8	8	10	10	10	9
Struga	3	5	3	3	6	5	7	8	9	8	6	7	7	7	7	7	6	6	7	7	7	8	10

Leader and qualification for the Champions League first qualifying round
Qualification for the Europa League first qualifying round
Qualification for the Relegation play-off final
Relegation to the Macedonian Second League

Source: macedonianfootball.com

== Season statistics ==
=== Top scorers ===
As of 8 March 2020

Rank	Player	Club	Goals
1	(North Macedonia) Daniel Avramovski	Vardar	10
2	(North Macedonia) Armend Alimi	Shkëndija	9
2	(Croatia) Nikola Prelčec	Borec	9
4	(Bosnia and Herzegovina) Marin Jurina	Shkupi	8
5	(Brazil) Paulo Carvalho	Makedonija G.P.	7
5	(North Macedonia) Remzifaik Selmani	Renova	7
5	(Brazil) Serginho	Shkupi	7
8	(North Macedonia) Bobi Bozhinovski	Makedonija G.P.	6
8	(North Macedonia) Besart Ibraimi	Shkëndija	6
10	6 players		5

== See also ==
- 2019–20 Macedonian Football Cup
- 2019–20 Macedonian Second Football League
