= FC Genç Kalemler =

Genç Kalemler
- Full name: Football Club Genç Kalemler
- Founded: 2015; 10 years ago
- Ground: City Stadium Gostivar, Gostivar
- Capacity: 1,000
- League: OFL Gostivar
- 2018–19: Second League (West), 9th (relegated)
Home colours	Away colours

FC Genç Kalemler (Macedonian: ФК Генч Калемлер, FK Gench Kalemler) is a football club of the Turkish community based in the village of Dolna Banjica near Gostivar, North Macedonia. They are currently competing in the OFS Gostivar league.

== History ==
The club was founded in 2015. Three years after the foundation of the club they already got promoted to the Second Macedonian League after having won the Third League West.

== Current squad ==
As of 18 September 2018

Note: Flags indicate national team as defined under FIFA eligibility rules; some limited exceptions apply. Players may hold more than one non-FIFA nationality.

No.	Pos.	Nation	Player
1	GK	(North Macedonia) MKD	Amir Jashar
2		(North Macedonia) MKD	Hasip Loki
3		(North Macedonia) MKD	Armend Dauti
4		(North Macedonia) MKD	Armend Chajani
5		(North Macedonia) MKD	Muhamed Bekir
6		(North Macedonia) MKD	Ismail Abdulovski
7	MF	(North Macedonia) MKD	Burak Menga
8	DF	(North Macedonia) MKD	Shaban Suliman
9		(North Macedonia) MKD	Elmir Aliji
10		(North Macedonia) MKD	Vildan Kerim

No.	Pos.	Nation	Player
11		(North Macedonia) MKD	Adis Bilali
12	GK	(North Macedonia) MKD	Gentijan Chadoroski
14	MF	(North Macedonia) MKD	Vulnet Elmazi
15	DF	(North Macedonia) MKD	Stefan Simonovski
17		(North Macedonia) MKD	Elvir Beqiri
18		(North Macedonia) MKD	Besim Alili
19	FW	(North Macedonia) MKD	Sunay Hasan
20	MF	(North Macedonia) MKD	Maliq Beluli
22		(North Macedonia) MKD	Besim Alili
—		(North Macedonia) MKD	Ibraim Jusufi
