= FK Osogovo =

ГФК Осогово GFK Osogovo
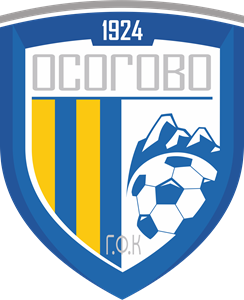
- Full name: Gradski fudbalski klub Osogovo Kochani / Градски фудбалски клуб Осогово Кочани
- Nickname: Жетвари (Harvesters)
- Founded: 1924; 102 years ago
- Ground: Stadion Nikola Mantov
- Capacity: 5,000
- Chairman: Goce Karanfilov
- Manager: Krste Krstev
- League: Macedonian Second League
- 2025–26: Macedonian Second League, 6th
- Website: https://web.archive.org/web/20200726144330/http://www.fkosogovo.com/
Home colours	Away colours

GFK Osogovo (Macedonian: ГФК Осогово) is a football club from Kočani, Republic of Macedonia. They are currently competing in the Macedonian Second League.

== History ==
FK Osogovo 1967 team

FK Osogovo in '90s

The club was founded in 1924 and is one of the oldest Macedonian football clubs.

In 1973, during a football match between FK Osogovo and FK FAS 11 Oktomvri from Skopje, the 23-year-old Nikola Mantov – one of the best players of FK Osogovo at the time – collapsed on the field and died. In his honor, the home-ground of FK Osogovo is named Nikola Mantov Stadium. The stadium has a capacity of approximately 5,000 spectators.

FK Osogovo has also retired the number 7 shirt in honor of Nikola Mantov.

In the first season of the Macedonian First Football League in 1992–93 Osogovo finished at eighth place; next season they finished at position nine. The highest place in Osogovo history in Macedonian First Football League was in the 1994–95 season, when the team finished at sixth position. Next season (1995–96) they finished at 14th place and were relegated to the Macedonian Second Football League. In the next few years, the team was relegated to the lowest division in Macedonian football (Macedonian Third Football League). From the 2004–05 to 2010–2011 seasons, Osogovo won the Macedonian Third Football League (East) five times, but played only once in the Macedonian Second Football League, in the 2011–12 season. In this season they finished at 14th place and were relegated to Macedonian Third Football League (East). In the last five seasons Osogovo appeared in the Macedonian Third Football League (East) without any success. But in season 2016-17 FK Osogovo finished at 3rd place and promoted to Macedonian Second Football league(East).

== Home Ground ==
Nikola Mantov Stadium is the home Ground of FK Osogovo.It has capacity of 5000 seats.

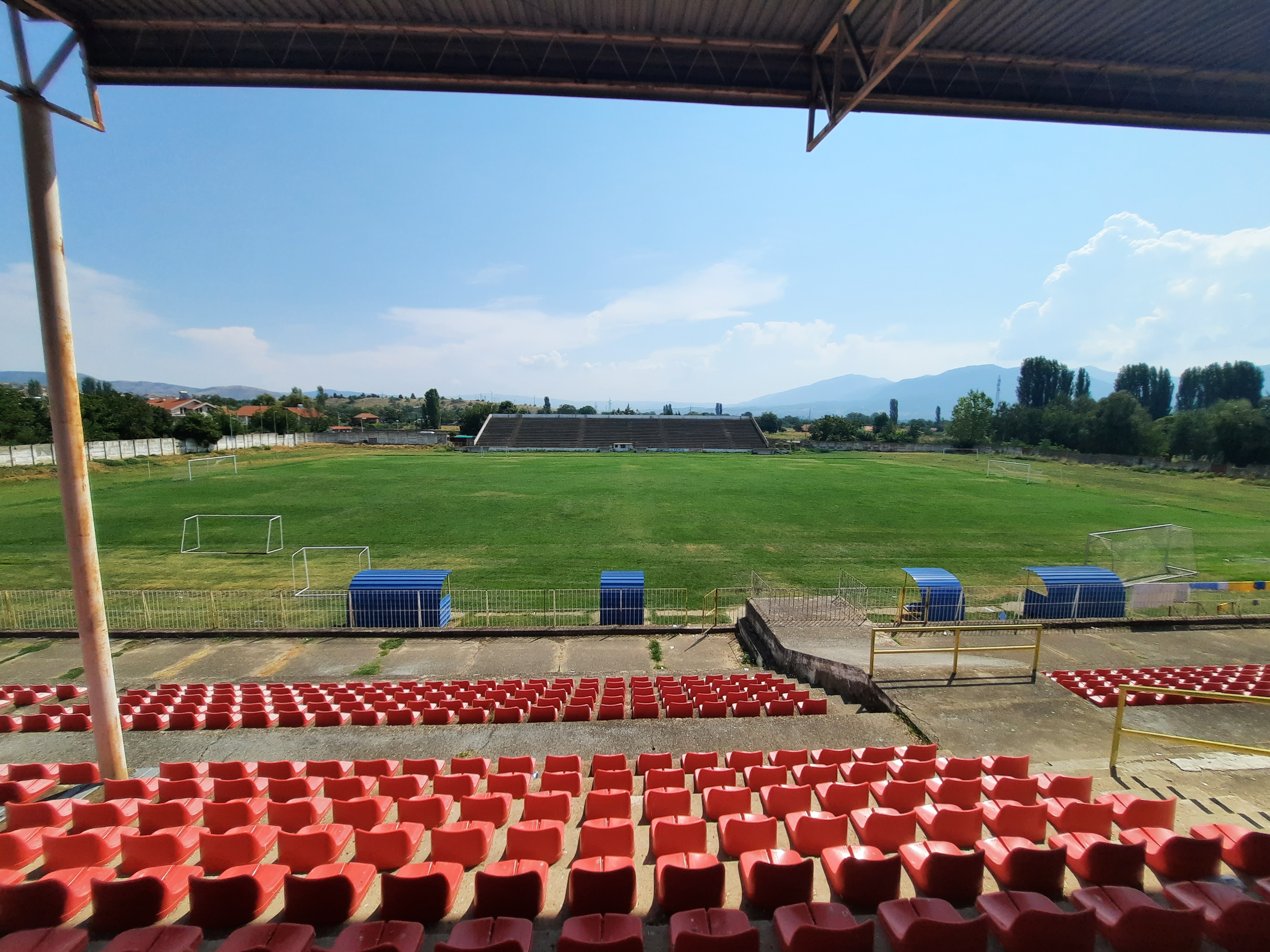

== Supporters ==
Sejmeni at commencement

Sejmeni attending at local rivals Sloga from Vinica

Sejmeni are an Ultras group founded in 1991, who support FK Osogovo and traditionally occupy the West Stand at the stadium. Also Sejmeni consumes a lot of pyrotechnics.

== Honours ==
- (North Macedonia) Macedonian Third League
  - Winners (2): 2018–19, 2022–23
- (North Macedonia) Macedonian Second League
  - Winners (1): 1997–98
  - Runners-up (1): 1996–97
- (North Macedonia) Macedonian Football Cup Youth
  - Winners (1): 1996

== Recent seasons ==
Season	League									Cup
Season	Division	P	W	D	L	F	A	Pts	Pos	Cup
1992–93	1. MFL	34	13	8	13	39	41	34	8th	
1993–94	1. MFL	30	9	9	12	33	44	27	9th	
1994–95	1. MFL	30	11	9	10	53	34	42	6th	
1995–96	1. MFL	28	6	8	14	31	53	26	14th ↓	
1996–97	2. MFL East	30	23	5	2	78	17	74	2nd	R1
1997–98	2. MFL East	29	21	5	13	90	26	68	1st ↑	
1998–99	1. MFL	26	7	4	15	27	47	25	12th	QF
1999–00	1. MFL	26	7	5	14	34	53	26	12th	R1
2000–01	1. MFL	26	10	4	12	39	42	34	9th	R1
2001–02	1. MFL	20	5	4	11	22	38	19	12th ↓	QF
2002–03	2. MFL	36	16	3	17	57	53	51	13th	R1
2003–04	2. MFL	32	12	3	17	50	60	39	13th ↓	R2
2004–05	3. MFL East	?	?	?	?	?	?	?	1st	PR
2005–06	3. MFL East	?	?	?	?	?	?	?	?	R1
2006–07	3. MFL East	?	?	?	?	?	?	?	?	R1
2007–08	3. MFL East	?	?	?	?	?	?	?	1st	PR
2008–09	3. MFL East	28	23	3	2	99	17	69^{(−3)}	1st	PR
2009–10	3. MFL East	?	?	?	?	?	?	?	1st	PR
2010–11	3. MFL East	25	20	2	3	82	20	62	1st ↑	R2
2011–12	2. MFL	30	6	4	20	29	63	22	14th ↓	PR
2012–13	3. MFL East	33	24	4	5	90	29	76	3rd	PR
2013–14	3. MFL East	26	16	3	7	63	34	51	3rd	PR
2014–15	3. MFL East	22	8	6	8	37	30	30	6th	PR
2015–16	3. MFL East	22	8	5	9	36	33	29	7th	PR
2016–17	3. MFL East	27	20	0	7	63	25	60	3rd ↑	PR
2017–18	2. MFL East	25	5	4	16	26	53	19	8th ↓	R1
2018–19	3. MFL East	25	17	4	4	58	25	55	1st ↑	R1
2019–20^{1}	2. MFL East	16	2	0	14	12	44	6	9th	N/A
2020–21	2. MFL East	27	7	8	12	32	43	29	7th	PR
2021–22	2. MFL East	27	8	7	12	34	45	31	8th ↓	PR
2022–23	3. MFL East	21	16	3	2	64	18	51	1st ↑	PR
2023–24	2. MFL	30	8	6	16	34	54	30	12th	PR
2024–25	2. MFL	30	7	8	15	29	44	29	14th	PR
2025–26	2. MFL	30	16	6	8	53	27	54	6th	PR

^{1}The 2019–20 season was abandoned due to the COVID-19 pandemic in North Macedonia.

== Current squad ==
As of 15 September 2026.

Note: Flags indicate national team as defined under FIFA eligibility rules; some limited exceptions apply. Players may hold more than one non-FIFA nationality.

No.	Pos.	Nation	Player
1	GK	MKD	Gjorgji Jovanoski
2	DF	MKD	Aleksandar Aleksov
3	DF	MKD	Aleks Dimitrov
4	DF	MKD	Milan Angelov
9	FW	MKD	Martin Aceski
10	MF	MKD	Marko Eftimov
11	MF	MKD	Stojche Stojov
12	GK	MKD	Simon Stojkovski
15	MF	MKD	Omer Idrizi
16	DF	MKD	Borjan Poposki
17	MF	MKD	Andrej Nikolov

No.	Pos.	Nation	Player}
18	DF	MKD	Gregori Davkov
19	FW	MKD	Filip Jovanov
20	MF	MKD	Ivan Nikolovski
21	DF	MKD	Nikolche Efremov
22	MF	MKD	Amir Fejzulai
23	MF	MKD	Darijan Trajchov
24	MF	MKD	Andrej Stoilov
25	MF	MKD	Alpaj Jusuf
26	FW	MKD	Mihail Zafiroski
—			

== Club officials ==
=== Technical staff ===
Manager	Kircho Gjorgiev
Assistant managers	Angelcho Arsov and Eftim Aksentiev
Goalkeeping coach	Goran Gjorgiev
Youth coordinator	Zoran Todorov

=== Board members ===
Chairman	Goran Milosov
Technical Director	Venko Krstevski
Director	Oliver Dosevski
Sport Director	Goran Teodosievski
Secretary	Simeoncho Stoikov
Technical Operator	Vitomir Aleksov
Security Commissioner	Dragoslav Zdravkov
