= FK Kozhuf =

ФК Кожуф FK Kozhuf
- Full name: Fudbalski klub Kozhuf Gevgelija
- Founded: 1922; 104 years ago
- Ground: Gradski Stadion Gevgelija
- Capacity: 2,500
- Chairman: Toshe Petkov
- Manager: Vangel Altiparmakovski
- League: Macedonian Second League
- 2025–26: Second League, 9th
- Website: http://fckozuf.com/
Home colours	Away colours

FK Kozhuf (Macedonian: ФК Кожуф) is a football club from Gevgelija, North Macedonia. They are currently competing in the Macedonian Second League.

== History ==
The club was founded in 1922.

They played in the Macedonian First League back in 1994–95 under the name Kožuf Vinojug.

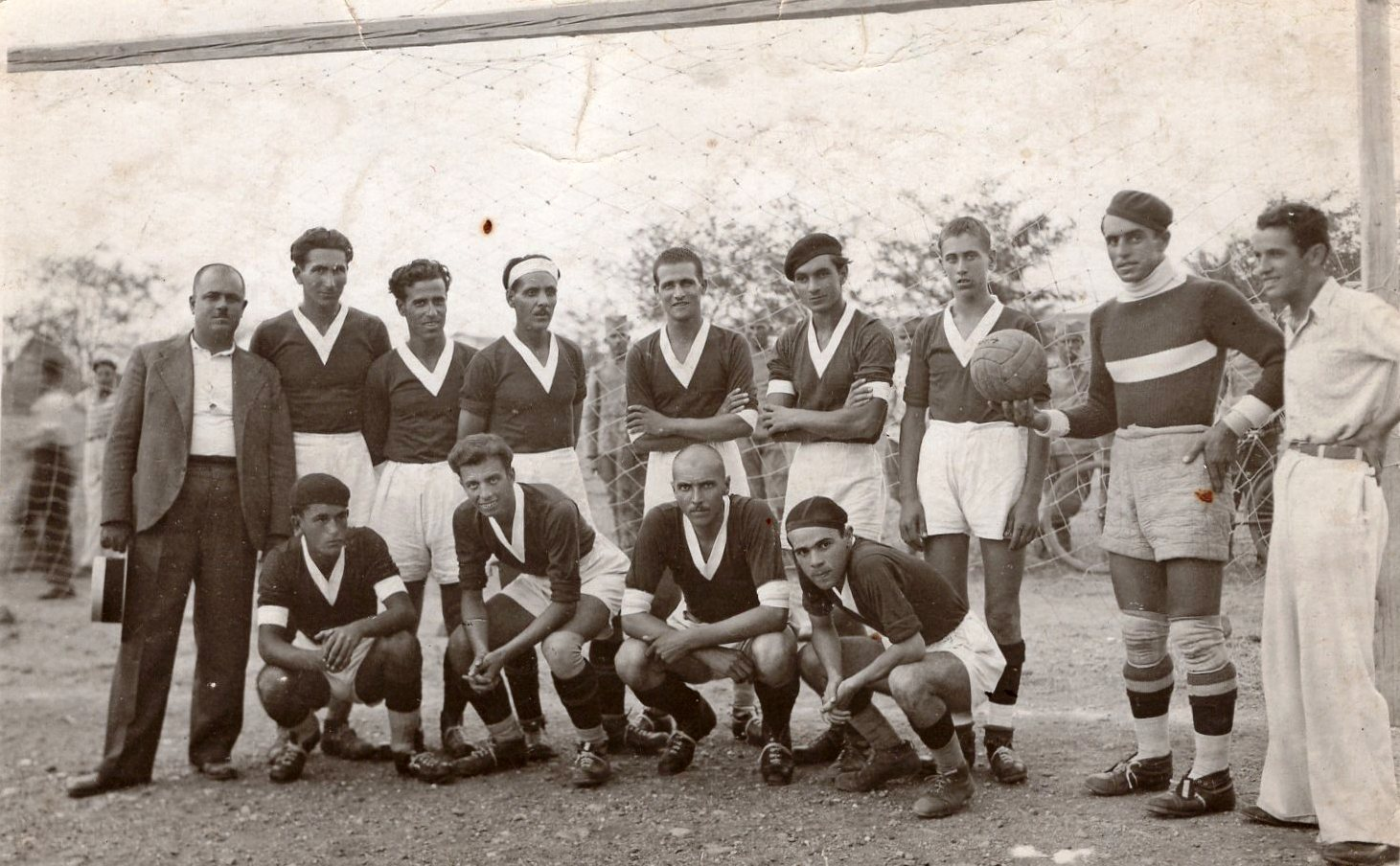
FK Kozhuf team 1930

== Home Ground ==
FK Kozhuv football stadium in Gevgelia has capacity of 1500 seats.

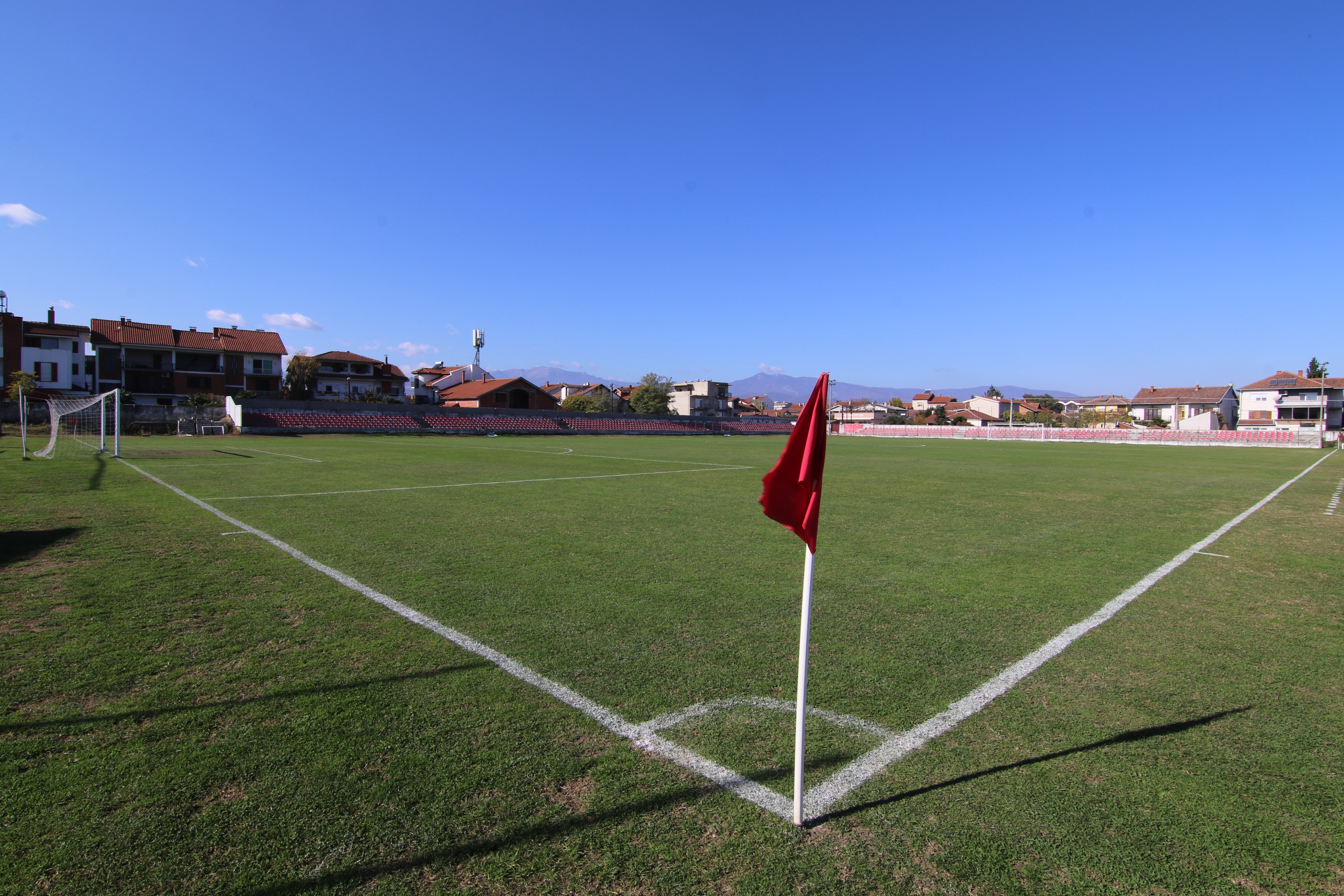
Stadion Gevegalia

== Honours ==
- (North Macedonia) Macedonian Second League
  - Winners (1): 1993–94

== Supporters ==
The supporters of FK Kozhuf are known as fantomi sever and they were founded in 1990.

== Recent seasons ==
Season	League									Cup
Season	Division	P	W	D	L	F	A	Pts	Pos	Cup
1992–93	2. MFL	38	18	4	16	60	52	43	7th	
1993–94	2. MFL East	26	18	6	2	57	23	42	1st ↑	
1994–95	1. MFL	30	2	4	24	18	99	7^{(−3)}	16th ↓	
1995–96	2. MFL East	30	11	6	13	29	39	39	13th	
1996–97	2. MFL East	30	12	3	15	29	39	39	13th	
1997–98	2. MFL East	29	11	5	13	35	53	38	12th	
1998–99	2. MFL East	29	11	3	15	52	67	36	11th	
1999–00	2. MFL East	30	9	2	19	51	83	29	12th ↓	PR
2000–01	3. MFL South	?	?	?	?	?	?	?	1st ↑	R1
2001–02	2. MFL	34	16	5	3	68	49	53	4th	PR
2002–03	2. MFL	36	14	3	19	40	65	45	15th ↓	R2
2003–04	3. MFL South	?	?	?	?	?	?	?	?	R1
2004–05	3. MFL South	?	?	?	?	?	?	?	?	PR
2005–06	3. MFL South	?	?	?	?	?	?	?	1st	R2
2006–07	3. MFL South	22	12	2	8	33	26	38	3rd	PR
2007–08	3. MFL South	23	17	6	0	64	16	57	1st ↑	PR
2008–09	2. MFL	29	6	8	15	28	50	26	13th ↓	R1
2009–10	3. MFL South	26	12	6	8	48	32	42	5th	PR
2010–11	3. MFL South	29	16	2	11	49	36	50	4th	PR
2011–12	3. MFL South	28	21	5	2	84	18	68	2nd	PR
2012–13	3. MFL South	30	17	8	5	68	25	56	4th	PR
2013–14	3. MFL South	25	3	3	19	29	59	9^{(−3)}	14th ↓	PR
2014–15	OFL Gevgelija	?	?	?	?	?	?	?	?	PR
2015–16	OFL Gevgelija	?	?	?	?	?	?	?	1st ↑	PR
2016–17	3. MFL South	25	22	2	1	85	9	67	1st ↑	R1
2017–18	2. MFL East	25	12	4	9	34	33	40	4th	R2
2018–19	2. MFL East	27	15	7	5	39	18	52	4th	R1
2019–20^{1}	2. MFL East	16	9	3	4	26	16	30	5th	N/A
2020–21	2. MFL East	27	9	9	9	29	35	36	5th	R2
2021–22	2. MFL East	27	9	10	8	31	24	37	5th	PR
2022–23	2. MFL	30	10	6	14	40	54	36	9th	R1
2023–24	2. MFL	30	11	5	14	33	36	38	10th	R1
2024–25	2. MFL	30	9	12	9	32	27	39	9th	R1
2025–26	2. MFL	30	12	9	9	50	26	45	9th	R1

^{1}The 2019–20 season was abandoned due to the COVID-19 pandemic in North Macedonia.

== Current squad ==
As from 6 September 2026.

Note: Flags indicate national team as defined under FIFA eligibility rules; some limited exceptions apply. Players may hold more than one non-FIFA nationality.

No.	Pos.	Nation	Player
1	GK	MKD	Borche Kartov
2	DF	MKD	Tomica Petrov
4	DF	MKD	Hristijan Bejkov
7	MF	MKD	Jasin Kazimoski
8	MF	MKD	Luka Trajkoski
9	FW	MKD	Angel Kochev
10	MF	MKD	Filip Todoroski
11	FW	MKD	David Ashovaliev
12	GK	MKD	Antonio Shemkoski
14	MF	MKD	Dimitar Duev
15	MF	MKD	Eren Partalko
16	DF	MKD	Riste Lembovski

No.	Pos.	Nation	Player
17	DF	MKD	Josip Popov
18	DF	MKD	Avram Boev
19	FW	MKD	Aleksandar Churlinov
20	DF	MKD	Bojan Ivcheski
22	DF	MKD	Bojan Boev
23	MF	MKD	Mario Simoski
24	DF	MKD	Ahmet Domazet
29	FW	MKD	Darko Grozdanoski
30	MF	MKD	Davor Bogeski
31	MF	MKD	Blagoj Stojchev
32	FW	MKD	Antian Emini
33	FW	MKD	Sasho Dukov
