= Zoran Todorov =

Macedonian footballer

Personal information
- Full name: Zoran Todorov
- Date of birth: 31 October 1982 (age 44)
- Place of birth: Kočani, SFR Yugoslavia
- Height: 1.80 m (5 ft 11 in)
- Position: Midfielder

Senior career*
Years	Team	Apps	(Gls)
- Osogovo
2001–2002	Bečej	15	(6)
2002–2003	Radnički Stobex	26	(4)
2003–2005	Mačva Šabac	31	(4)
2005–2006	Palić		
2006–2007	Mačva Šabac	22	(2)
2007–2008	Zemun	37	(4)
2009	→ Voždovac (loan)	10	(3)
2009–2012	Smederovo	39	(0)
- * Club domestic league appearances and goals

Zoran Todorov (Macedonian: Зоран Тодоров; born 31 October 1982) is a Macedonian retired footballer.

== Club career ==
Born in Kočani, SR Macedonia, SFR Yugoslavia, he started his career playing with his local club FK Osogovo in the Macedonian First League. Afterwards, he moved to Serbia where he played until 2005 in the Second League of Serbia and Montenegro with FK Bečej and FK Mačva Šabac. After a season with FK Palić in 2005, Todorov returned to Mačva playing in the same level, in the renamed Serbian First League (PLS). In the summer of 2007 he moved to FK Zemun; however, after their relegation in 2008 he was loaned to FK Voždovac playing back in the PLS. Regular playing time helped him sign a three-year contract with Serbian SuperLiga side FK Smederevo in the summer of 2009.

== Administrative career ==
In December 2017, Zoran was announced as Youth Coordinator of FK Osogovo.
