= Stefan Đurić =

Serbian footballer

Personal information
- Full name: Stefan Đurić
- Date of birth: 22 May 1995 (age 31)
- Place of birth: Užice, FR Yugoslavia
- Height: 1.93 m (6 ft 4 in)
- Position: Forward

Youth career
- Sloboda Užice

Senior career*
Years	Team	Apps	(Gls)
2014	Spartak Trnava	1	(0)
2014–2015	Spartak Trnava B	12	(2)
2015	Sloboda Užice	6	(0)
2016–2017	Jedinstvo Užice		
2017–2018	Zlatibor Čajetina		
2018–2019	Jagodina		
2019	Sloboda Užice	14	(2)
2019–2020	Sileks Kratovo	38	(4)
2021	Olympiacos Volou		
2022	Nestos Chrysoupoli		
- * Club domestic league appearances and goals as of 1 August 2021

Stefan Đurić (Serbian Cyrillic: Стефан Ђурић; born 22 May 1995) is a Serbian football forward.

== Career ==
Đurić passed the youth school of Sloboda Užice. As a captain of captain and best scorer of youth team, he moved to Slovakia, and signed four-year contract with Spartak Trnava in summer 2014. He made his debut in Slovak Super Liga, but later played only for the second team, where he scored 2 goals in 12 matches. In summer 2015, he returned to Sloboda Užice.
