= FK Labunishta =

- Full name: Fudbalski Klub Labunishta
- Founded: 2011; 14 years ago
- Ground: Stadion Kalishta
- Chairman: Safet Demiralieski
- Manager: Pepi Djigeroski
- Final season 2018–19: Macedonian Second League, 2nd
Home colours	Away colours

FK Labunishta (Macedonian: ФК Лабуништа, FK Labuništa) is a football club based in the village of Labuništa near Struga, North Macedonia. They recently competed professionally in the Macedonian Second League (West Division), while their most recent appearance was in the municipal leagues.

== History ==
The club was founded in 2011.

After the 2016/17 3rd division season, they were promoted to the 2.MFL West via playoffs for the first time in the club's history, and they finished fifth in the following 2017/18 season, avoiding relegation.

The 2018/19 season was a big breakthrough for the club, finishing second to municipal rivals and future Macedonian champions FC Struga, giving them a place in the promotion playoffs, which they lost 6–3 to GFK Tikves. This concludes arguably the pinnacle season of the club.

The 2019/20 season was the final season as a top club for FK Labunishta. They were destined to achieve promotion to the first division, being arguably the best team of that season's west division. They also reached the quarter-final of the 2019/20 Macedonian Cup, bowing out to 2nd division counterparts FK Bregalnica. As the season was halted due to the COVID-19 pandemic, FK Labunishta did not achieve promotion nor relegation, however the club was bought out by FK Teteks, replacing them in the 2020/21 season, in which Teteks played under the FK Labunishta name and badge as a way to honor the club.

Attempts to reopen the club as a phoenix club have been made, with a new club made in the regional division and a buyout of 3rd division side FK Idnina, however these attempts have yet to bring the success of the old club.
