= Dolna Banjica =

Dolna Banjica Долна Бањица Banjicë e Poshtme Aşağı Banisa
- Village
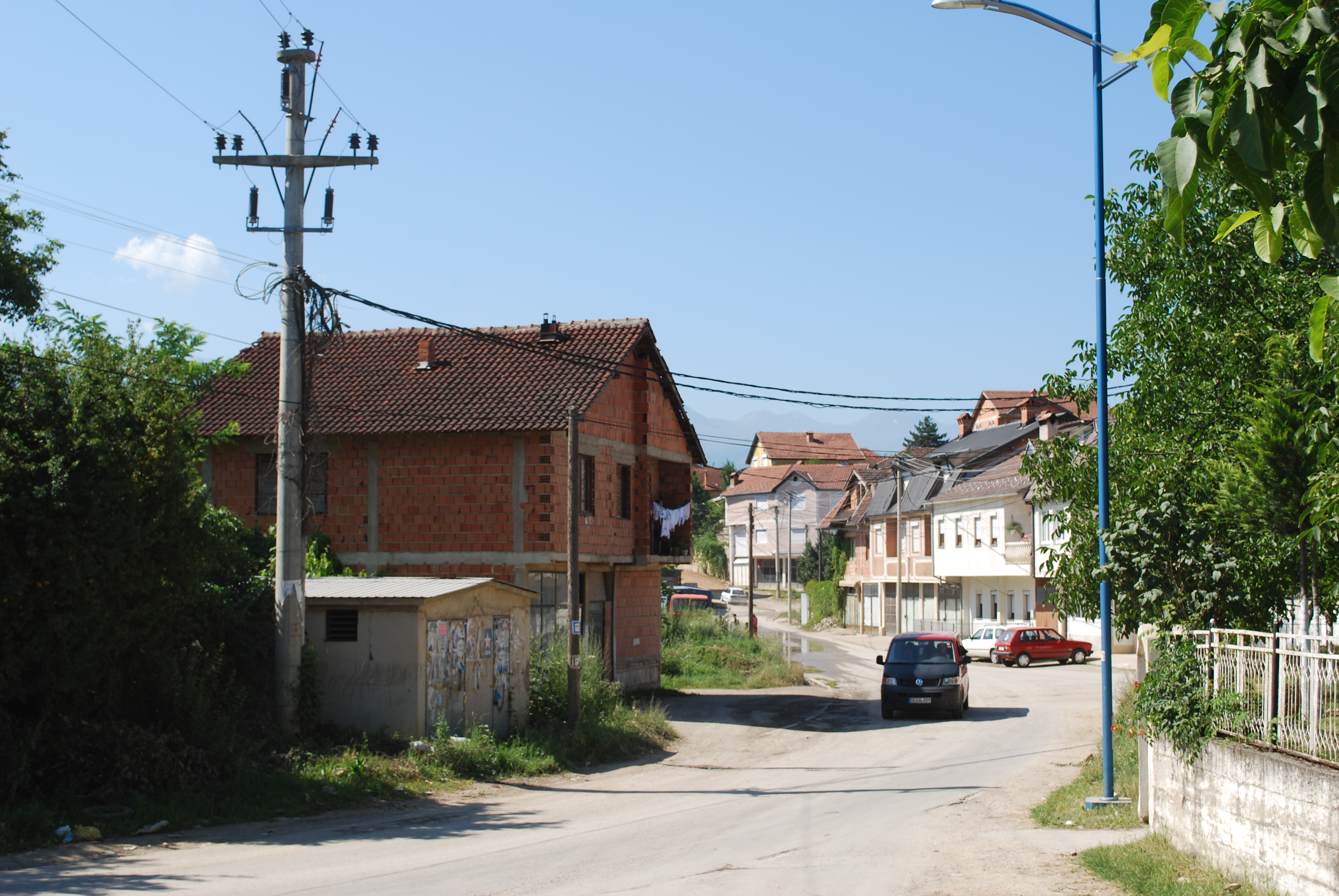

- Location within North Macedonia
- Coordinates: 41°47′N 20°54′E
- Country: North Macedonia
- Region: Polog
- Municipality: Gostivar

Population (2021)
  - Total: 3,138
- Time zone: UTC+1 (CET)
  - Summer (DST): UTC+2 (CEST)
- Car plates: GV
- Website: .

Dolna Banjica (Macedonian: Долна Бањица; Turkish: Aşağı Banisa; Albanian: Banjicë e Poshtme) is a village in the municipality of Gostivar, North Macedonia. Its FIPS code was MK27.

== History ==
Dolna Banjica is attested in the 1467/68 Ottoman tax registry (defter) for the Nahiyah of Kalkandelen. The village had a total of 34 Christian households, 2 widows and 2 bachelors.

A policy of Turkification of the Albanian population was employed by the Yugoslav authorities in cooperation with the Turkish government, stretching the period of 1948–1959. Starting in 1948, Turkish schools were opened in areas with large Albanian majorities, such as Gorna Banjica and Dolna Banjica.

== Demographics ==
According to the 1942 Albanian census, Dolna Banjica was inhabited by 987 Muslim Albanians, 139 Serbophone Orthodox Albanians, 25 Serbs and 11 Macedonians.

The Yugoslav census of 1953 recorded 1,445 people of whom 939 were Albanians, 264 Macedonians, 218 Turks, 13 Romani and 11 others. The 1961 Yugoslav census recorded 1,498 people of whom 240 were Albanians, 898 Turks, 325 Macedonians and 35 others. The 1971 census recorded 2,484 people of whom 729 were Albanians, 1,074 Turks, 656 Macedonian and 25 others. The 1981 Yugoslav census recorded 4,251 people of whom 1,540 were Albanians, 1,405 Macedonians, 1,234 Turks, 25 Bosniaks and 47others. The Macedonian census of 1994 recorded 5,408 people of whom 2,810 were Albanians, 1,236 Turks, 1,150 Macedonians, 189 Romani and 23 others.

According to the 2002 census, the village had a total of 4,356 inhabitants. Ethnic groups in the village include:

- Albanians 2,444
- Turks 1,524
- Macedonians 355
- Romani 9
- Serbs 1
- Bosniaks 1
- Others 23

As of the 2021 census, Dolna Banjica had 3,138 residents with the following ethnic composition:

- Turks 1,254
- Albanians 1,166
- Macedonians 391
- Persons for whom data are taken from administrative sources 307
- Roma 14
- Others 6

== Sports ==
The local football club FC Genç Kalemler has played in the Macedonian Second Football League.
