= Yannick Makota =

Cameroonian-French footballer (born 1992)

Personal information
- Full name: Yannick Daniel Jacques Makota Ngalle
- Date of birth: 20 January 1992 (age 34)
- Place of birth: Lyon, France
- Height: 1.80 m (5 ft 11 in)
- Position: Forward

Team information
- Current team: Manfredonia

Senior career*
Years	Team	Apps	(Gls)
2010–2012	Nancy B	39	(4)
2012–2013	Lyon La Duchère		
2013–2014	Market Drayton Town		
2014–2015	Sporting da Covilhã	5	(0)
2015–2016	Pays d'Aix	15	(5)
2016–2017	AS Marck	24	(7)
2017–2018	Francs Borains		
2018–2019	Pobeda	30	(5)
2019	Jeunesse Esch	12	(5)
2020	Saham		
2020–2021	Bisceglie	20	(3)
2021	Hapoel Umm al-Fahm	2	(0)
2021–2022	RG Ticino	15	(2)
2022	Francs Borains	10	(1)
2023–	Manfredonia	2	(1)
- * Club domestic league appearances and goals as of 17:56, 15 February 2023 (UTC)

Yannick Daniel Jacques Makota Ngalle (born 20 January 1992) is a French footballer who plays as a forward for Eccellenza Apulia club Manfredonia.

== Club career ==
Makota started his career with the reserves of French Ligue 1 side Nancy. After that, he signed for Market Drayton Town in the English eighth division. In 2014, Makota signed for Portuguese second division club Sporting da Covilhã after trialing for Shrewsbury Town in the English third division. In 2015, he signed for French fifth division team Pays d'Aix. In 2017, he signed for Francs Borains in the Belgisn fourth division. In 2018, Makota signed for Macedonian outfit Pobeda. In 2019, he signed for Jeunesse in Luxembourg.

Before the second half of 2019–20, he signed for Omani side Saham but left due to the COVID-19 pandemic. In 2020, Makota signed for Bisceglie in the Italian third division, where he made 20 league appearances and scored 3 goals. On 13 December 2020, he debuted for Bisceglie during a 3–1 loss to Catanzaro. On 20 December 2020, Makota scored his first goal for Bisceglie during a 2–1 loss to Virtus Francavilla. In 2021, he signed for Israeli second division club Hapoel Umm al-Fahm.

== International career ==
Makota represented Cameroon at the 2011 FIFA U-20 World Cup.
