= KF Vardari Forinë =

Vardari Forinë
- Full name: Klubi Futbollistik Vardari Forinë
- Founded: 1974; 51 years ago
- Ground: Stadion Leska
- Chairman: Xhemal Aliu
- Manager: Gajur Rexhepi
- League: Third League
- 2020/21: ▼10th, Second League (West)
Home colours	Away colours

KF Vardari Forinë (Macedonian: ФК Вардар Форино, romanized: FK Vardar Forino) is a football club based in the village of Forinë, Gostivar Municipality, North Macedonia. They are currently competing in the Macedonian Second League (West Division).

== History ==
The club was founded in 1974.
