= FK Detonit Plachkovica =

ФК Детонит Плачковица FK Detonit Plachkovica
- Full name: Fudbalski klub Detonit Plačkovica / Фудбалски клуб Детонит Плачковица
- Founded: 1942; 84 years ago as FK Plachkovica
- Ground: Gradski Stadion Radoviš
- Capacity: 2,000
- Chairman: Jovica Trajcev
- Manager: Goran Zdravkov
- League: Macedonian Second League
- 2025/26: Second League, 8th
Home colours	Away colours

FK Detonit Plachkovica (Macedonian: ФК Детонит Плачковица) is a football club from Radoviš, North Macedonia. They are currently competing in the Macedonian Second League.

== History ==
Crest from the Plačkovica's era until 2022

The club was founded in 1942. In 2022, the club was merged with FK Detonit Junior and youth team Azzurri and since then it has been called Detonit Plachkovica.

== Supporters ==
FK Detonit Plachkovica's supporters are called Lebari Istok (Macedonian: Лебари Исток, Bread makers East), who were founded in 1991 and also support the local handball team, RK Radovish.

== Honours ==
Macedonian Second League

- Third place (3): 1995–96, 1997–98, 2023–24

== Current squad ==
As of 15 September 2026.

Note: Flags indicate national team as defined under FIFA eligibility rules; some limited exceptions apply. Players may hold more than one non-FIFA nationality.

No.	Pos.	Nation	Player
1	GK	MKD	Pavel Petrevski
3	DF	MKD	Daniel Velichkov
4	DF	MKD	Tino Spasikj
6	MF	MKD	Emir Shabotikj
7	FW	MKD	Filip Dimoski
9	FW	MKD	Branimir Ivanov
10	MF	MKD	Darko Aleksovski
11	MF	MKD	Mahir Ajruli
12	GK	MKD	Dimitar Gjorgiev
14	MF	MKD	Aleksandar Smilkov
14	MF	MKD	Harun Limanov
16	MF	MKD	Bojan Mitrov
17	DF	MKD	Toni Mirchevski

No.	Pos.	Nation	Player
18	MF	MKD	Bojan Mitrov
19	MF	MKD	Aleksandar Smilkov
20	MF	MKD	David Golubov
21	MF	MKD	Filip Gligorovski
22	MF	MKD	Luka Bojadjiev (on loan from Bregalnica)
23	MF	MKD	Mario Adjiev
24	MF	MKD	Zoran Andonov
26	DF	MKD	Leonid Kofilovski
27	MF	MKD	Asan Rifadov
28	MF	MKD	Stefan Babunski
47	MF	MKD	Slavco Janev
91	MF	MKD	Darko Denkov
—			
