= FK Pehchevo =

Pehchevo
- Full name: Fudbalski klub Pehchevo
- Founded: 1975
- Ground: Gradski stadion Pehchevo
- Chairman: Gjorgji Kitanovski
- Manager: Ivan Varadinovski
- 2021/22: 7th, Second League (East)
- Website: http://www.fkkitgo.mk/
| Home colours | Away colours |

FK Pehchevo (Macedonian: ФК Пехчево) is a football club from Pehčevo, North Macedonia. They are recently competed in the Macedonian Second League.

== History ==
Crest with sponsor name between 2015 and 2022

The club was founded in 1975. In 2015, the club purchased by businessman Kiril Gogov and renamed to Kit-Go Pehchevo to associate it with the chain of markets with the same name. In 2022, Kiril Gogov sold Kit-Go and as such the club changed its name to simply FK Pehchevo.

== Current squad ==
As of 4 July 2022.

Note: Flags indicate national team as defined under FIFA eligibility rules; some limited exceptions apply. Players may hold more than one non-FIFA nationality.

| No. | Pos. | Nation | Player |
|---|---|---|---|
| 1 | GK | (North Macedonia) MKD | Stojan Bogdanovski |
| 5 | DF | (North Macedonia) MKD | Darko Nikolov |
| 7 | MF | (North Macedonia) MKD | Dimitrij Dimitrievski |
| 8 | MF | (North Macedonia) MKD | Rushtu Jonus |
| 10 | MF | (North Macedonia) MKD | Mario Runtev |
| 11 | MF | (North Macedonia) MKD | Zoran Andonov |
| 15 | DF | (North Macedonia) MKD | Emir Mustafa |
| 16 | FW | (North Macedonia) MKD | Kostantin Kocev |
| 17 | MF | (North Macedonia) MKD | Aleksandar Aleksov |

| No. | Pos. | Nation | Player |
|---|---|---|---|
| 19 | MF | (North Macedonia) MKD | Boban Angelov |
| 20 | MF | (North Macedonia) MKD | Leon Cuckovski |
| 22 | MF | (North Macedonia) MKD | Doan Bajrmov |
| 23 | FW | (North Macedonia) MKD | Viktor Mirchevski |
| 24 | DF | (North Macedonia) MKD | Kristijan Trpchevski |
| 96 | GK | (North Macedonia) MKD | Kiril Petrovski |
| — | MF | (North Macedonia) MKD | Darko Jovanov |
| — | FW | (North Macedonia) MKD | Mihail Dimitrievski |
| — | FW | (North Macedonia) MKD | Kire Trpchevski |
