= KF Gostivari =

Macedonian football club

K.F. Gostivari
- Full name: Klubi Futbollistik Gostivari
- Founded: 1919
- Ground: City Stadium Gostivar
- Capacity: 1,000
- League: Macedonian Third League (Region 6)

K.F. Gostivari is a professional football club based in Gostivar, North Macedonia. They currently compete in the Macedonian Third League (Region 6).

== History ==
2019-2025 KF Gostivari Bagde

The club was founded in 1919 as Rinia Gostivar. They merged with FK Gostivar in 2010 and were renamed KF Gostivari with the original FK Gostivar getting dissolved.

In the 2012–13 season, Gostivari finished second and was promoted to the Macedonian First League for the first time in club history.

Its first win in 2013/14 season was on 18/08/2013 against FK Rabotnički. Gostivari's defender Ekrem Hodžić scored two goals contributing in the 2–0 win.

They finished as runners-up in the 2022–23 Macedonian Second Football League and were once again promoted to the Macedonian First League for the 2023/24 season. KF Gostivari withdrew from the Macedonian First League in 2025.

A phoenix club of KF Gostivari with the same name but a different badge got promoted to the Macedonian third league for the 2026/27 season, re-entering the Macedonian professional football league again.

== Supporters ==
Their fan club is known as Kastriotët named after Gjergj Kastrioti, an Albanian national hero.

== Notable former players ==
This is a list of Gostivari players with senior national team appearances:

1. (North Macedonia) (Albania) Xhelil Abdulla
2. (North Macedonia) Filip Despotovski
3. (North Macedonia) (Albania) Imran Fetai
4. (North Macedonia) Darko Glishikj
5. (North Macedonia) (Albania) Zija Merxhani
6. (North Macedonia) (Albania) Visar Musliu
7. (North Macedonia) Dushko Trajchevski
8. (North Macedonia) (Albania) Mevlan Murati
9. (Guinea-Bissau) Aldair Baldé
10. (Morocco) Nabil Dirar
11. (Syria) Aias Aosman
12. (Turkey) Alper Potuk
13. (Socialist Federal Republic of Yugoslavia) Dragan Mutibarić

== Honours ==
- (North Macedonia) Macedonian Second League:
  - Runners-up (1): 2012–13, 2022–23
