= City Stadium Gostivar =

Stadium in Gostivar, North Macedonia

Coordinates: 41.8°N 20.916667°E

City Stadium Gostivar Stadiumi i qytetit të Gostivarit
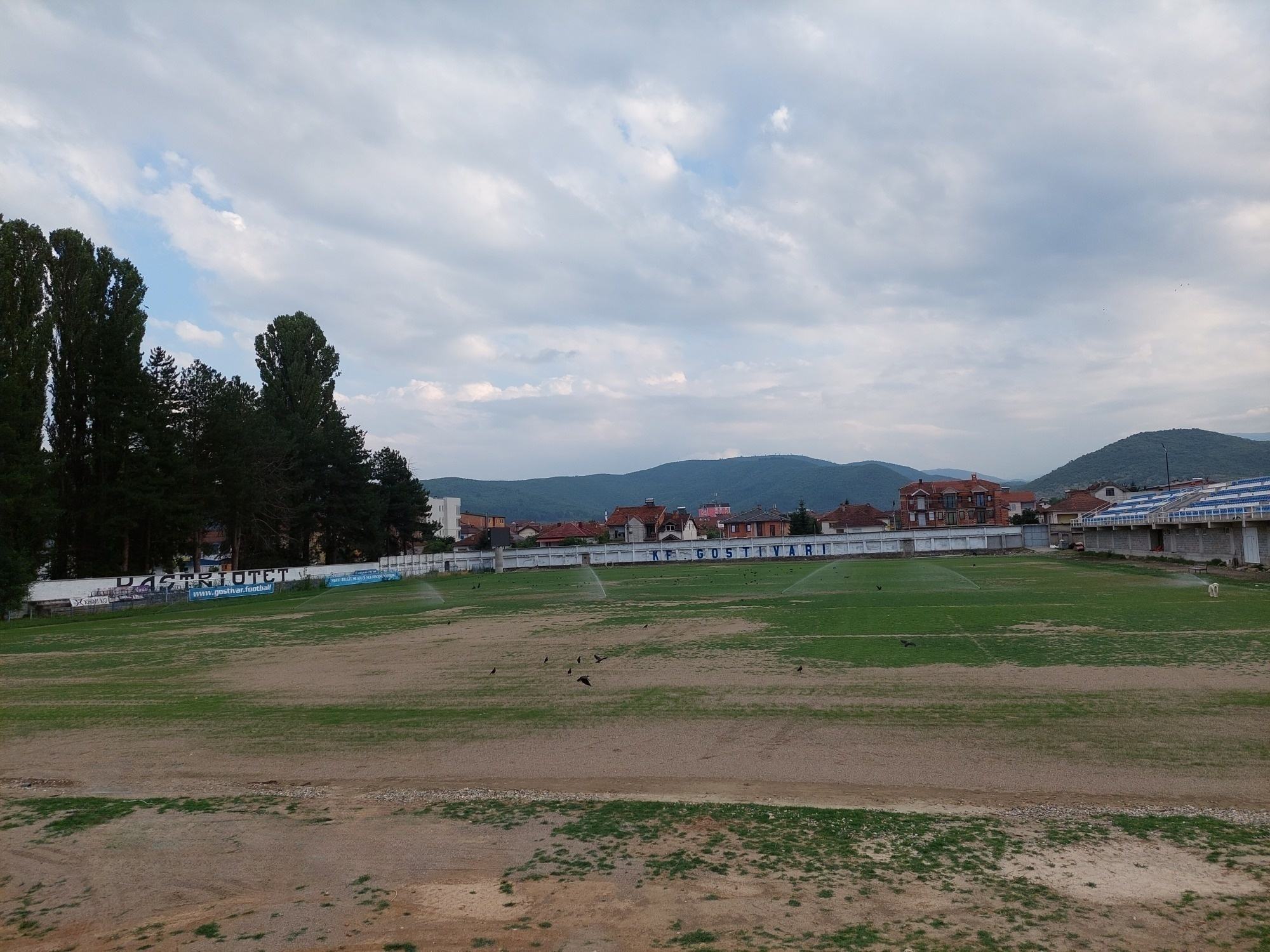
- Interactive map of City Stadium Gostivar; Stadiumi i qytetit të Gostivarit
- Location: Gostivar, North Macedonia
- Owner: Gostivar Municipality
- Capacity: 4,000
- Surface: Grass

Tenants
- Gostivari (2010-2024); KF Besa Dobërdoll (2024-2025); KF Arsimi (2025-present)

City Stadium Gostivar (Albanian: Stadiumi i qytetit të Gostivarit; Macedonian: Градски стадион Гостивар) is a multi-purpose stadium in Gostivar, North Macedonia. It is currently used mostly for football matches and was the home stadium of FK Gostivar and now currently is home stadium of KF Besa Dobërdoll. The stadium holds 1,000 people. As of 2015, the stadium is undergoing renovation.
