= Gradska Plaža Stadium =

Stadium in Struga, North Macedonia

Coordinates: 41°10′22″N 20°41′3″E

Gradska Plaža Stadium Cтадион „Градска Плажа“ Stadiumi “Plazhi i Qytetit”
- Interactive map of Gradska Plaža Stadium; Cтадион „Градска Плажа“ Stadiumi “Plazhi i Qytetit”
- Location: Struga, North Macedonia
- Owner: Struga Municipality
- Capacity: 2,000
- Surface: Grass

Construction
- Opened: 1970

Tenants
- FK Karaorman; FC Struga

Gradska Plaža Stadium (Macedonian: Cтадион „Градска Плажа“) or Stadiumi Plazhi i Qytetit is a multi-purpose stadium in Struga, North Macedonia. It has a capacity of about 800 and it is currently the home ground of FK Karaorman and FC Struga.
