= 2025–26 Macedonian Football Cup =

Tournament details
- Country: North Macedonia
- Dates: 26 August 2025 – 20 May 2026
- Teams: 29

Final positions
- Champions: Sileks (4th title)
- Runners-up: Shkëndija

Tournament statistics
- Matches played: 31
- Goals scored: 125 (4.03 per match)

The 2025–26 Macedonian Football Cup was the 34th season of North Macedonia's football knockout competition. Vardar were the defending champions, having won their sixth title in the previous year.

Sileks won the cup on 20 May 2026 (their fourth Macedonian Football Cup win), defeating Shkëndija 1–0 in the final.

== Competition calendar ==
Round	Date(s)	Fixtures	Clubs	New entries
First Round	26 August 2025	14	29 → 16	none
Second Round	24 September and 21 October 2025	8	16 → 8	4
Quarter-finals	25 February 2026	8	8 → 4	none
Semi-finals	22 April and 6 May 2026	4	4 → 2	none
Final	20 May 2026	1	2 → 1	none

== First round ==
The draw was held on 30 July 2025. The finalists from the previous season (Struga and Vardar) received byes.

=== Summary ===
Team 1	Score	Team 2
26 August 2025
Bashkimi (GJ) (3)	1–4	Detonit Plachkovica (2)
Karbinci (3)	0–16	Rabotnichki (1)
Evrotip (3)	1–7	Sileks (1)
Pobeda Valandovo (3)	0–6	Bregalnica (2)
Ohrid (2)	1–1 (5–3 p)	AP Brera (1)
Ljuboten (3)	0–14	Makedonija G.P. (1)
27 August 2025
Belasica (2)	2–2 (3–2 p)	Arsimi (1)
2 September 2025
Shkëndija 77 (2)	1–1 (4–3 p)	Sasa (2)
3 September 2025
Teteks (2)	1–2	Pelister (1)
Pchinja (3)	0–3	Novaci (2)
9 September 2025
Pobeda (2)	0–4	Bashkimi (1)
10 September 2025
Skopje (2)	0–1	Tikvesh (1)
Jeni Maale (4)	0–9	Shkëndija (1)
Kozhuf (2)	0–2	Shkupi (1)

=== Matches ===
26 August 2025
16:00 CEST

Bashkimi (GJ) (3)	1–4	Detonit Plachkovica (2)
Jashari 28'	Report	Filipovski 19'; Smilkov 26'; Limanov 69'; Janev 90+3'

Stadion Zoran Paunov, Veles
Referee: Borche Pavlovikj (Skopje)

26 August 2025
16:00 CEST

Karbinci (3)	0–16	Rabotnichki (1)
	Report	T. Nikolovski 7', 63'; Daley 18', 40'; B. Demiri 20'; Mecinovikj 22'; Kadriu 25'; Asani 28', 61'; Angelov 43'; Elezi 45'; Boshnakov 46'; Zhaku 66', 70'; Hoxha 82', 90'

AMS Stadium, Karbinci
Attendance: 50
Referee: Spire Arsov (Kochani)

26 August 2025
16:00 CEST

Evrotip (3)	1–7	Sileks (1)
Marcevski 58'	Report	Berovikj 4'; Alić 65'; Govedarica 72', 74'; Hrvanović 82', 84', 88'

Stadion Novaci, Novaci
Referee: Vladimir Gjorgjievski (Bitola)

26 August 2025
16:00 CEST

Pobeda Valandovo (3)	0–6	Bregalnica (2)
	Report	Madevski 17' (o.g.); H. Demiri 21'; Temelkov 53'; Kalpachki 67'; Ivanov 79'; Tasev 81'

Gradski stadion, Valandovo
Attendance: 992
Referee: Jordan Jovanovski (Gevgelija)

26 August 2025
16:00 CEST

Ohrid (2)	1–1	AP Brera (1)
Gligorov 74'	Report; Penalties	Mitrev 3'
Penalties
Partalko (penalty scored); Dimitrievski (penalty scored); Gligorov (penalty scored); Poposki (penalty scored); Kalanoski (penalty scored)	5–3	(penalty scored) Ristov; (penalty scored) Velkov; (penalty missed) Hassan; (penalty scored) Mihailov

SRC Biljanini Izvori, Ohrid
Referee: Stojanche Trpchevski (Skopje)

26 August 2025
16:00 CEST

Ljuboten (3)	0–14	Makedonija G.P. (1)
	Report	Hristov 8', 35', 43'; Adem 14', 84'; Markoski 27', 60'; Djangarovski 28'; Elmas 31'; Talakov 56', 70'; Cabarcas 63'; Ristevski 68'; Ramić 75'

Stadion Gjorche Petrov, Skopje
Referee: Nikola Petkovski (Kumanovo)

27 August 2025
16:00 CEST

Belasica (2)	2–2	Arsimi (1)
Kocev 51'; Krstev 85'	Report; Penalties	Jahiji 45'; Perović 56'
Penalties
Milushev (penalty scored); Mladenovski (penalty missed); Tomovski (penalty missed); Kocev (penalty scored); Petejchuk (penalty scored)	3–2	(penalty scored) Avduli; (penalty scored) Cuculi; (penalty missed) Gafuri; (penalty missed) A. Ramadani; (penalty missed) Bešagić

Stadion Blagoj Istatov, Strumica
Referee: Vlatko Ilioski (Prilep)

2 September 2025
15:30 CEST

Shkëndija 77 (2)	1–1	Sasa (2)
Aliji 88'	Report; Penalties	Spasovski 59'
Penalties
Aliji (penalty scored); Gjorgjieski (penalty scored); Dimov (penalty scored); Trpeski (penalty missed); Desnikj (penalty scored)	4–3	(penalty missed) Ajruli; (penalty missed) Michkovski; (penalty scored) Bekir; (penalty scored) Efremov; (penalty scored) Radevski

KF Bashkimi Stadium, Kumanovo
Referee: Benjamin Kjerimi (Skopje)

3 September 2025
15:30 CEST

Teteks (2)	1–2	Pelister (1)
D. Nikolovski 35'	Report	Stojanovski 52'; Spirovski 85'

Stadion Jegunovce, Jegunovce
Referee: Nenad Todorovski (Skopje)

3 September 2025
15:30 CEST

Pchinja (3)	0–3	Novaci (2)
	Report	Marcevski 45+2'; Karevski 67', 85'

Stadion Petrovec, Petrovec
Referee: Ile Nikodinoski (Skopje)

9 September 2025
15:30 CEST

Pobeda (2)	0–4	Bashkimi (1)
	Report	Hadžić 25'; Memeti 76'; Mislimi 80'; Avornyo 82'

Stadion Goce Delchev, Prilep
Referee: Blagojche Ralevski (Bitola)

10 September 2025
15:30 CEST

Skopje (2)	0–1	Tikvesh (1)
	Report	Ivanovski 47'

Stadion Zhelezarnica, Skopje
Referee: Aleksandar Uroshevikj (Tetovo)

10 September 2025
15:30 CEST

Jeni Maale (4)	0–9	Shkëndija (1)
	Report	Mazari 5', 8', 13'; F. Ramadani 18'; Ademi 70'; Latifi 83'; Krasniqi 85', 87'

Gradski stadion, Tetovo
Referee: Ninoslav Nankov (Skopje)

10 September 2025
15:30 CEST

Kozhuf (2)	0–2	Shkupi (1)
	Report	Muharem 31'; Adili 87'

Gradski stadion, Gevgelija
Attendance: 300
Referee: Marjan Dejanoski (Kichevo)

== Second round ==
The draw was held on 17 September 2025.

=== Summary ===
Team 1	Score	Team 2
24 September 2025
Ohrid (2)	3–0	Shkupi (1)
Belasica (2)	0–1	Detonit Plachkovica (2)
21 October 2025
Makedonija G.P. (1)	0–5	Struga (1)
Bashkimi (1)	1–2	Sileks (1)
Shkëndija 77 (2)	1–0	Pelister (1)
Rabotnichki (1)	1–1 (4–3 p)	Bregalnica (2)
22 October 2025
Vardar (1)	3–1	Novaci (2)
19 November 2025
Shkëndija (1)	2–0	Tikvesh (1)

=== Matches ===
24 September 2025
15:00 CEST

Ohrid (2)	3–0	Shkupi (1)
Gligorov 25', 82'; Kalanoski 28'	Report

SRC Biljanini Izvori, Ohrid
Referee: Marjan Stojanovski (Kichevo)

24 September 2025
15:00 CEST

Belasica (2)	0–1	Detonit Plachkovica (2)
	Report	Galevski 3'

Stadion Blagoj Istatov, Strumica
Referee: Kiril Smokvoski (Prilep)

21 October 2025
14:00 CEST

Makedonija G.P. (1)	0–5	Struga (1)
	Report	Ivković 29'; Vosha 51'; Compaoré 76'; Maleski 86'; Jevtoski 90+1'

Stadion Gjorche Petrov, Skopje
Referee: Done Ristovski (Gevgelija)

21 October 2025
14:00 CEST

Bashkimi (1)	1–2	Sileks (1)
Simonovski 42'	Report	Dodev 4'; Nikolić 70'

KF Bashkimi Stadium, Kumanovo
Attendance: 850
Referee: Stojanche Trpchevski (Skopje)

21 October 2025
14:00 CEST

Shkëndija 77 (2)	1–0	Pelister (1)
Lamallari 51'	Report

Hasanbeg Arena, Skopje
Referee: Dimitar Pileshkov (Shtip)

21 October 2025
14:00 CEST

Rabotnichki (1)	1–1	Bregalnica (2)
Asani 13' (pen.)	Report; Penalties	Mandak 49'
Penalties
Asani (penalty missed); Imeri (penalty scored); Almeida (penalty scored); Velkovski (penalty scored); B. Demiri (penalty scored)	4–3	(penalty scored) Temelkov; (penalty missed) Siljanovski; (penalty scored) Aleksovski; (penalty scored) Serafimovski; (penalty missed) Kocev

Stadion Zhelezarnica, Skopje
Attendance: 100
Referee: Furkan Idrizi (Tetovo)

22 October 2025
14:00 CEST

Vardar (1)	3–1	Novaci (2)
E. Spahiu 9'; Omeragikj 18'; Tchimbembé 79'	Report	Jovanovski 44' (pen.)

Petar Miloshevski Training Centre, Skopje
Referee: Kiril Smokvoski (Prilep)

19 November 2025
13:00 CET

Shkëndija (1)	2–0	Tikvesh (1)
Alhassan 44'; Mazari 90+1'	Report

Gradski stadion, Tetovo
Referee: Aleksandar Grujoski (Kichevo)

== Quarter-finals ==
The draw was held on 23 January 2026.

=== Summary ===
Team 1	Score	Team 2
24 February 2026
Vardar (1)	1–1 (2–4 p)	Ohrid (2)
Shkëndija 77 (2)	3–1	Rabotnichki (1)
25 February 2026
Detonit Plachkovica (2)	0–3	Sileks (1)
18 March 2026
Struga (1)	2–2 (4–5 p)	Shkëndija (1)

=== Matches ===
24 February 2026
14:00 CET

Vardar (1)	1–1	Ohrid (2)
Nikolov 60'	Report; Penalties	Mateski 90'
Penalties
Nikolov (penalty missed); Cvetković (penalty scored); Bosančić (penalty scored); Danev (penalty missed)	2–4	(penalty missed) Spirkoski; (penalty scored) Jahja; (penalty scored) Bakracheski; (penalty scored) Kalanoski; (penalty scored) Ilieski

Petar Miloshevski Training Centre, Skopje
Referee: Dimitar Pileshkov (Shtip)

24 February 2026
14:00 CET

Shkëndija 77 (2)	3–1	Rabotnichki (1)
Desnikj 40'; Sharkoski 60'; Nazifi 85'	Report	B. Demiri 64'

KF Bashkimi Stadium, Kumanovo
Referee: Aleksandar Grujoski (Kichevo)

25 February 2026
14:00 CET

Detonit Plachkovica (2)	0–3	Sileks (1)
	Report	Dodev 30'; Angjeleski 63'; Pires 69'

Gradski stadion, Kratovo
Referee: Aleksandar Uroshevikj (Tetovo)

18 March 2026
14:30 CET

Struga (1)	2–2	Shkëndija (1)
Radeski 13'; Hamza 82'	Report; Penalties	Ibraimi 70'; Fetai 90+4'
Penalties
Compaoré (penalty scored); Hamza (penalty scored); Jevtoski (penalty missed); Maleski (penalty scored); Bojku (penalty scored)	4–5	(penalty scored) Ibraimi; (penalty scored) Krasniqi; (penalty scored) Latifi; (penalty scored) Trumçi; (penalty scored) S. Spahiu

Gradska Plazha, Struga
Referee: Fatmir Bafto (Ohrid)

== Semi-finals ==
The draw was held on 23 January 2026. The first legs will be played on 22 April and the second legs on 6 May 2026.

=== Summary ===
Team 1	Agg.	Team 2	1st leg	2nd leg
Ohrid (2)	1–2	Sileks (1)	1–1	0–1
Shkëndija (1)	5–2	Shkëndija 77 (2)	3–2	2–0

=== Matches ===
22 April 2026
12:00 CEST

Ohrid (2)	1–1	Sileks (1)
Gligorov 36'	Report	Alić 45+1'

SRC Biljanini Izvori, Ohrid
Referee: Done Ristovski (Gevgelija)
6 May 2026
16:00 CEST

Sileks (1)	1–0	Ohrid (2)
Dodev 35' (pen.)	Report

Gradski stadion, Kratovo
Referee: Igor Stojchevski (Skopje)

Sileks won 2–1 on aggregate.

22 April 2026
14:00 CEST

Shkëndija (1)	3–2	Shkëndija 77 (2)
Trumçi 4' (pen.); Krstevski 54'; Meliqi 69'	Report	Nuhija 30'; Livareka 43'

Gradski stadion, Tetovo
Referee: Benjamin Kjerimi (Skopje)
6 May 2026
16:00 CEST

Shkëndija 77 (2)	0–2	Shkëndija (1)
	Report	S. Spahiu 85'; Ndzengue 89'

KF Bashkimi Stadium, Kumanovo
Referee: Stojanche Stojanov (Shtip)

Shkëndija won 5–2 on aggregate.

== Final ==
20 May 2026
20:00 CEST

Sileks (1)	1–0	Shkëndija (1)
Alić 71'	Report 1 Report 2

Toshe Proeski Arena, Skopje
Attendance: 4,000
Referee: Igor Stojchevski (Skopje)

== Season statistics ==
=== Top scorers ===
As of 20 May 2026.

Rank	Player	Club	Goals
1	(North Macedonia) Ivan Gligorov	Ohrid	4
1	(North Macedonia) Atdhe Mazari	Shkëndija	4
3	(Bosnia and Herzegovina) Adi Alić	Sileks	3
3	(North Macedonia) Xhelil Asani	Rabotnichki	3
3	(North Macedonia) Darko Dodev	Sileks	3
3	(North Macedonia) Simeon Hristov	Makedonija G.P.	3
3	(Bosnia and Herzegovina) Aldin Hrvanović	Sileks	3
8	(North Macedonia) Ali Adem	Makedonija G.P.	2
8	(Jamaica) Cristojaye Daley	Rabotnichki	2
8	(North Macedonia) Besir Demiri	Rabotnichki	2
8	(Bosnia and Herzegovina) Miljan Govedarica	Sileks	2
8	(North Macedonia) Ditmir Hoxha	Rabotnichki	2
8	(North Macedonia) Stefan Karevski	Novaci	2
8	(Kosovo) Endrit Krasniqi	Shkëndija	2
8	(North Macedonia) Antonio Marcevski	Novaci	2
8	(North Macedonia) Kire Markoski	Makedonija G.P.	2
8	(North Macedonia) Teodor Nikolovski	Rabotnichki	2
8	(North Macedonia) Martin Talakov	Makedonija G.P.	2
8	(North Macedonia) Lorent Zhaku	Rabotnichki	2

== See also ==
- 2025–26 Macedonian First Football League
- 2025–26 Macedonian Second Football League
