= 2023–24 Macedonian Football Cup =

Tournament details
- Country: North Macedonia
- Dates: 20 September 2023 – 22 May 2024
- Teams: 28

Final positions
- Champions: Tikvesh (1st title)
- Runners-up: Voska Sport

Tournament statistics
- Matches played: 29
- Goals scored: 84 (2.9 per match)

The 2023–24 Macedonian Football Cup was the 32nd season of North Macedonia's football knockout competition. The winners qualified for the 2024–25 Conference League first qualifying round.

Tikvesh won the cup on 22 May 2024 (their first Macedonian Football Cup win), defeating Voska Sport 2–1 in the final.

== Competition calendar ==
Round	Date(s)	Fixtures	Clubs	New entries
First Round	20 September 2023	12	28 → 16	none
Second Round	25 October 2023	8	16 → 8	4
Quarter-finals	8 November 2023	4	8 → 4	none
Semi-finals	3 and 17 April 2024	4	4 → 2	none
Final	22 May 2024	1	2 → 1	none

== First round ==
The draw was held on 29 August 2023. The semi-finalists from the previous season (Makedonija G.P., Shkëndija, Sileks, and Struga) received byes.

=== Summary ===
Team 1	Score	Team 2
20 September 2023
Young Team (3)	0–0 (4–3 p)	Pobeda (2)
Novaci (2)	0–8	Bregalnica (1)
Bashkimi (2)	1–1 (4–3 p)	Skopje (2)
Arsimi (2)	1–2	Tikvesh (1)
Kožuf (2)	0–2	AP Brera (1)
Karbinci (3)	0–10	Voska Sport (1)
Ohrid (2)	2–0	Detonit Plačkovica (2)
Belasica (2)	0–0 (0–3 p)	Gostivar (1)
BVK Konjare (3)	0–8	Shkupi (1)
Besa Dobërdoll (2)	1–1 (4–5 p)	Vardar (1)
Teteks (2)	0–3	Rabotnički (1)
Vëllazërimi J 1977 (3)	0–4	Pelister (2)

=== Matches ===
20 September 2023
15:00 CEST

Young Team (3)	0–0	Pobeda (2)
	Report; Penalties
Penalties
Kreka (penalty missed); Ataj (penalty missed); Lena (penalty scored); Osmani (penalty scored); Bauta (penalty scored); Mena (penalty scored)	4–3	(penalty missed) Pop Antoski; (penalty missed) I. Trajkoski; (penalty scored) Gorgiovski; (penalty scored) Beleski; (penalty scored) Arifi; (penalty missed) Spirkoski

Gradska Plazha, Struga
Referee: Darko Stojanov (Shtip)

20 September 2023
15:00 CEST

Novaci (2)	0–8	Bregalnica (1)
	Report	Webster 12', 19'; Stepanenko 36'; Kalpachki 45'; Tasev 56'; Gligorov 77', 81', 84'

Stadion Novaci, Novaci
Referee: Plarent Salihi (Tetovo)

20 September 2023
15:00 CEST

Bashkimi (2)	1–1	Skopje (2)
Kjaili 90+6'	Report; Penalties	Dani 24'
Penalties
Mustafi (penalty scored); B. Aliji (penalty scored); Alili (penalty scored); Memeti (penalty scored)	4–3	(penalty scored) Bozhinovski; (penalty scored) Velinovski; (penalty scored) Poposki; (penalty missed) Belja; (penalty missed) Andonovski

KF Bashkimi Stadium, Kumanovo
Attendance: 300
Referee: Ivana Projkovska (Skopje)

20 September 2023
15:00 CEST

Arsimi (2)	1–2	Tikvesh (1)
Gafuri 67'	Report	Ivanovski 12'; Mihailov 34'

Rechica Stadium, Golema Rechica
Referee: Dimitar Leveski (Ohrid)

20 September 2023
15:00 CEST

Kožuf (2)	0–2	AP Brera (1)
	Report	Donov 49'; Ristevski 52'

Gradski stadion, Gevgelija
Attendance: 200
Referee: Blagojche Ralevski (Bitola)

20 September 2023
15:00 CEST

Karbinci (3)	0–10	Voska Sport (1)
	Report	Olatunbosun 13', 54', 88'; Stojchevski 18'; Shabani 28', 52'; Hajdari 31'; Iseni 68'; Ramadani 80'; Rashid 82' (pen.)

AMS Stadium, Karbinci
Referee: Angel Gelov (Kavadarci)

20 September 2023
15:00 CEST

Ohrid (2)	2–0	Detonit Plačkovica (2)
Nicheski 2'; S. Stojanovski 86'	Report

SRC Biljanini Izvori, Ohrid
Referee: Darko Kotevski (Bitola)

20 September 2023
15:00 CEST

Belasica (2)	0–0	Gostivar (1)
	Report; Penalties
Penalties
Jovov (penalty missed); Guguljanov (penalty missed); Hristovski (penalty missed)	0–3	(penalty scored) Timovski; (penalty scored) Atiemwen; (penalty scored) Kehinde

Stadion Kukush, Turnovo
Referee: Vlatko Ilioski (Prilep)

20 September 2023
15:00 CEST

BVK Konjare (3)	0–8	Shkupi (1)
	Report	Ackovski 33'; Niltinho 40', 49', 57'; Adjami 45+2' (o.g.); Hodžić 50', 72'; Vosha 84'

Stadion Petrovec, Petrovec
Attendance: 200
Referee: Slobodan Bocevski (Skopje)

20 September 2023
15:00 CEST

Besa Dobërdoll (2)	1–1	Vardar (1)
Alimi 34'	Report; Penalties	Milosavić 32' (pen.)
Penalties
Emini (penalty scored); Alimi (penalty scored); Dragarski (penalty missed); Esati (penalty scored); Shabani (penalty scored); Rakipi (penalty missed)	4–5	(penalty missed) Pedrinho; (penalty scored) Duranski; (penalty scored) Biljali; (penalty scored) L. Trajkoski; (penalty scored) Veceski; (penalty scored) Omeragikj

Stadion Vrapchishte, Vrapchishte
Referee: Krumislav Gjorgiev (Shtip)

20 September 2023
15:00 CEST

Teteks (2)	0–3	Rabotnički (1)
	Report	Mazari 87'; Gando 90+1'; G. Stojanovski 90+2'

AMS Stadium, Tetovo
Attendance: 200
Referee: Angelcho Ristov (Negotino)

20 September 2023
15:00 CEST

Vëllazërimi J 1977 (3)	0–4	Pelister (2)
	Report	Josheski 35'; Ljamchevski 45' (pen.); Razmoski 51'; Hristov 87'

Vëllazërimi Arena, Kichevo
Referee: Jordan Jovanovski (Gevgelija)

== Second round ==
The draw was held on 26 September 2023.

=== Summary ===
Team 1	Score	Team 2
25 October 2023
Vardar (1)	0–1	Makedonija G.P. (1)
Bregalnica (1)	11–0	Young Team (3)
Rabotnički (1)	3–2	Shkëndija (1)
Sileks (1)	3–2	Bashkimi (2)
Pelister (2)	0–1	Tikvesh (1)
AP Brera (1)	0–0 (5–4 p)	Gostivar (1)
Shkupi (1)	4–0	Ohrid (2)
Voska Sport (1)	0–0 (4–1 p)	Struga (1)

=== Matches ===
25 October 2023
14:00 CEST

Vardar (1)	0–1	Makedonija G.P. (1)
	Report	A. Aliji 63'

Stadion Boris Trajkovski, Skopje
Attendance: 200
Referee: Dimitar Pileshkov (Shtip)

25 October 2023
14:00 CEST

Bregalnica (1)	11–0	Young Team (3)
Gligorov 2', 8', 19', 47', 70'; Gjorgjiev 11'; Kolev 35'; Kanform 41', 81'; Webster 79'; Dimitrievski 83'	Report

Gradski stadion, Shtip
Attendance: 500
Referee: Ivana Projkovska (Skopje)

25 October 2023
14:00 CEST

Rabotnički (1)	3–2	Shkëndija (1)
V. Stojanovski 9'; Gando 48'; Mazari 59'	Report	Cake 17'; Beari 43'

Petar Miloshevski Training Centre, Skopje
Attendance: 300
Referee: Aleksandar Grujoski (Kichevo)

25 October 2023
14:00 CEST

Sileks (1)	3–2	Bashkimi (2)
Kalanoski 10', 13'; Angjeleski 48'	Report	B. Aliji 64'; Ljutfiu 85'

Gradski stadion, Kratovo
Attendance: 150
Referee: Fatmir Bafto (Ohrid)

25 October 2023
14:00 CEST

Pelister (2)	0–1	Tikvesh (1)
	Report	Mojsov 86'

Stadion Petar Miloshevski, Bitola
Referee: Nderim Tefiku (Kumanovo)

25 October 2023
14:00 CEST

AP Brera (1)	0–0	Gostivar (1)
	Report; Penalties
Penalties
Ribaudo (penalty scored); Franco (penalty scored); Vrdoljak (penalty scored); Léo Antônio (penalty scored); Trajkov (penalty scored)	5–4	(penalty scored) Kehinde; (penalty scored) Atiemwen; (penalty missed) Ramadani; (penalty scored) Timovski; (penalty scored) Potuk

Sports Center "Pandev", Strumica
Attendance: 150
Referee: Krumislav Gjorgiev (Shtip)

25 October 2023
14:00 CEST

Shkupi (1)	4–0	Ohrid (2)
Sampaio 17'; Trapanovski 75'; Queven 86'; Mladenovski 90'	Report

Stadion Petrovec, Petrovec
Referee: Blagojche Ralevski (Bitola)

25 October 2023
14:00 CEST

Voska Sport (1)	0–0	Struga (1)
	Report; Penalties
Penalties
Marušić (penalty scored); Stjepović (penalty scored); Nikolić (penalty scored); Stojchevski (penalty scored)	4–1	(penalty scored) Radeski; (penalty missed) Kasami; (penalty missed) Bojku

SRC Biljanini Izvori, Ohrid
Referee: Stojanche Trpchevski (Kavadarci)

== Quarter-finals ==
The draw was held on 27 October 2023.

=== Summary ===
Team 1	Score	Team 2
8 November 2023
Bregalnica (1)	0–1	Voska Sport (1)
Makedonija G.P. (1)	1–0	Sileks (1)
Tikvesh (1)	1–1 (6–5 p)	AP Brera (1)
9 November 2023
Rabotnički (1)	0–1	Shkupi (1)

=== Matches ===
8 November 2023
13:00 CET

Bregalnica (1)	0–1	Voska Sport (1)
	Report	Jasharoski 70'

Gradski stadion, Shtip
Attendance: 120
Referee: Aleksandar Stavrev (Skopje)

8 November 2023
13:00 CET

Makedonija G.P. (1)	1–0	Sileks (1)
A. Aliji 66'	Report

Stadion Gjorche Petrov, Skopje
Attendance: 20
Referee: Jovan Kachevski (Struga)

8 November 2023
13:00 CET

Tikvesh (1)	1–1	AP Brera (1)
Kurež 52'	Report; Penalties	Donchev 45+1' (o.g.)
Penalties
Ivanovski (penalty scored); Mojsov (penalty scored); Kurež (penalty missed); Spahiu (penalty missed); Karcheski (penalty scored); Ibishi (penalty scored); Donchev (penalty scored); Petkovski (penalty scored)	6–5	(penalty scored) Ribaudo; (penalty missed) Franco; (penalty missed) Vrdoljak; (penalty scored) Maleski; (penalty scored) Galevski; (penalty scored) Ristevski; (penalty scored) Krstevski; (penalty missed) Gjorgievski

Gradski stadion, Kavadarci
Attendance: 300
Referee: Marjan Mladenovski (Skopje)

9 November 2023
13:00 CET

Rabotnički (1)	0–1	Shkupi (1)
	Report	Mladenovski 66'

Petar Miloshevski Training Centre, Skopje
Referee: Krumislav Gjorgiev (Shtip)

== Semi-finals ==
The draw was held on 8 March 2024. The first legs was played on 2 and 3 April and the second legs on 17 April 2024.

=== Summary ===
Team 1	Agg.	Team 2	1st leg	2nd leg
Shkupi (1)	0–0 (3–5 p)	Tikvesh (1)	0–0	0–0
Voska Sport (1)	3–2	Makedonija G.P. (1)	2–0	1–2

=== Matches ===
2 April 2024
15:00 CEST

Shkupi (1)	0–0	Tikvesh (1)
	Report

Stadion Chair, Skopje
Referee: Jovan Kachevski (Struga)
17 April 2024
15:00 CEST

Tikvesh (1)	0–0	Shkupi (1)
	Report; Penalties
Penalties
Silva (penalty scored); Stojkovski (penalty scored); Karcheski (penalty scored); Neto (penalty scored); Spirkoski (penalty scored)	5–3	(penalty missed) Ilieski; (penalty scored) Pintér; (penalty scored) Grønner; (penalty scored) Damasceno

Gradski stadion, Kavadarci
Attendance: 3,500
Referee: Aleksandar Grujovski (Kichevo)

0–0 on aggregate. Tikvesh won 5–3 in penalty shootout.

3 April 2024
15:00 CEST

Voska Sport (1)	2–0	Makedonija G.P. (1)
Bajrami 38'; Georgiev 39'	Report

SRC Biljanini Izvori, Ohrid
Referee: Krumislav Gjorgiev (Shtip)
17 April 2024
15:00 CEST

Makedonija G.P. (1)	2–1	Voska Sport (1)
Fazli 25'; Velkoski 64'	Report	Jahiji 13'

Stadion Gjorche Petrov, Skopje
Attendance: 100
Referee: Stojanche Trpchevski (Kavadarci)

Voska Sport won 3–2 on aggregate.

== Final ==
22 May 2024
19:00 CEST

Tikvesh (1)	2–1	Voska Sport (1)
Stojkovski 41'; Silva 59'	Report 1 Report 2	Sharkoski 77'

Toshe Proeski Arena, Skopje
Attendance: 7,000
Referee: Aleksandar Stavrev (Skopje)

== Season statistics ==
=== Top scorers ===
As of 21 April 2024.

Rank	Player	Club	Goals
1	(North Macedonia) Ivan Gligorov	Bregalnica	8
2	(Brazil) Niltinho	Shkupi	3
2	(Nigeria) Sikiru Olatunbosun	Voska Sport	3
2	(Jamaica) Ronaldo Webster	Bregalnica	3
5	(North Macedonia) Altin Aliji	Makedonija G.P.	2
5	(Cameroon) Marcelin Gando	Rabotnički	2
5	(Bosnia and Herzegovina) Armin Hodžić	Shkupi	2
5	(North Macedonia) Antonio Kalanoski	Sileks	2
5	(The Gambia) Solomon King Kanform	Bregalnica	2
5	(Albania) Atdhe Mazari	Rabotnički	2
5	(North Macedonia) Mario Mladenovski	Shkupi	2
5	(North Macedonia) Alban Shabani	Voska Sport	2

== See also ==
- 2023–24 Macedonian First Football League
- 2023–24 Macedonian Second Football League
