= 2025–26 Macedonian First Football League =

Macedonian First League
- Season: 2025–26
- Dates: 8 August 2025 – 25 May 2026
- Champions: Vardar; 12th Macedonian title
- Relegated: Brera; Pelister; Makedonija G.P. Rabotnički; Shkupi
- Champions League: Vardar
- Conference League: Shkëndija; Sileks
- Matches: 198
- Goals: 610 (3.08 per match)
- Top goalscorer: Bassirou Compaoré (17 goals)
- All statistics correct as of 25 May 2026.

The 2025–26 Macedonian First League was the 34th season of the Macedonian First Football League, the highest football league of North Macedonia. It began on 8 August 2025 and ended on 25 May 2026. Shkëndija were the defending champions, having won their fifth title in 2024–25.

== Promotion and relegation ==
At the end of the 2024–25 season

Promoted from 2024–25 Second League

- Makedonija G.P. (winners, promoted after one season absence)
- Arsimi (runners-up, promoted for the first time in their history)
- Bashkimi (Third placed; won play-off, promoted for the first time in their history)

Relegated to 2025–26 Second League

- Besa (10th; lost play-off, relegated after a single-season spell in top flight)
- Gostivar (11th, relegated after a two-season spell in top flight)^{1}
- Voska Sport (12th, relegated after a ewo-season spell in top flight)^{2}

At the end of the 2025–26 season

Promoted from 2025–26 Second League

- Bregalnica (winners, promoted after two-season absence)
- Skopje (second place; won play-off, promoted after three-season absence)
- Shkëndija 77 (Third place; won play-off, promoted for the first time in their history)

Relegated to 2026–27 Second League

- Brera (8th; lost play-off, relegated after a nine-season spell in the top flight)
- Pelister (9th; lost play-off, relegated after a two-season spell in the top flight)
- Makedonija G.P. (10th, relegated after a single-season spell in top flight)
- Rabotnički (11th, relegated after a 28-season spell in top flight)
- Shkupi (12th, relegated after an 11-season spell in top flight)

^{1}Gostivar withdrew from the First League after a leaving of pitch at the 29th round match against Rabotnički.
^{2}Voska Sport withdrew from the First League after a leaving of pitch at the 28th round match against Vardar.

== Participating teams ==
Arsimi / Student	AP Brera	Shkendija/ Iskra	Rabotnički	Sileks
City Stadium Gostivar	Blagoj Istatov Stadium; UEFA	Tetovo Stadium	National Arena Toše Proeski; UEFA	Sileks Stadium
Capacity: 4,000	Capacity: 9,200	Capacity: 15,000	Capacity: 33,011	Capacity: 4,800
Pelister	Location of teams in 2025–26 Macedonian First League			Makedonija G.P.
Petar Miloshevski Stadium	Location of teams in 2025–26 Macedonian First League			Gjorče Petrov Stadium
Capacity: 10,000	Location of teams in 2025–26 Macedonian First League			Capacity: 3,000
Bashkimi/ Sloga	Struga	Tikvesh	Vardar	Shkupi/ Scupi
Kumanovo Stadium	Gradska Plaža Stadium	Kavadarci City Stadium	National Arena Toše Proeski; UEFA	Livadishta Stadium
Capacity: 3,500	Capacity: 4,000	Capacity: 9,000	Capacity: 33,011	Capacity: 7,500

=== Personnel and kits ===
Note: Flags indicate national team as has been defined under FIFA eligibility rules. Players may hold more than one non-FIFA nationality.

Team	Manager	Captain	Kit manufacturer	Shirt sponsor
Arsimi	(North Macedonia) Vildan Saliu	(North Macedonia) Vulnet Islami	Sporttex	Ardival AG
Bashkimi	(North Macedonia) Muarem Muarem	(North Macedonia) Armend Alimi	Jako	Aristan holdings LTD
Brera	(North Macedonia) Martin Alagjozovski	(North Macedonia) Filip Antovski	Sportika SA	Mozzart
Makedonija G.P.	(North Macedonia) Boban Grnčarov	(North Macedonia) Jovan Popzlatanov	Joma	KX.BLR
Pelister	(North Macedonia) Dimitar Kapinkovski	(North Macedonia) Mirko Ivanovski	Joma	
Rabotnichki	(Turkey) Alparslan Erdem	(Albania) Besir Demiri	Joma	
Shkëndija	(North Macedonia) Jeton Beqiri	(North Macedonia) Besart Ibraimi	Macron	Ecolog
Shkupi	(Turkey) Ümit Sahin	(North Macedonia) Suhejlj Muharem	Reaction	
Sileks	(North Macedonia) Aleksandar Vasoski	(North Macedonia) Darko Angjeleski	Macron	Sileks
Struga	(Albania) Bledi Shkëmbi	(North Macedonia) Bunjamin Shabani	Macron	Trim & Lum
Tikvesh	(North Macedonia) Gjorgji Mojsov	(North Macedonia) Aleksandar Varelovski	Joma	Sinalco
Vardar	(North Macedonia) Goce Sedloski	(Bosnia and Herzegovina) Goran Zakarić	Erima	Novomatic Macedonia

== League table ==
Pos	Team	Pld	W	D	L	GF	GA	GD	Pts	Qualification or relegation
1	Vardar (C)	33	26	5	2	80	21	+59	83	Qualification for the Champions League first qualifying round
2	Shkëndija	33	23	5	5	67	30	+37	74	Qualification for the Conference League first qualifying round
3	Struga	33	19	5	9	68	28	+40	62	
4	Sileks	33	16	5	12	59	36	+23	53	Qualification for the Conference League first qualifying round (Note: Sileks qualified for the first qualifying round of Conference League as winners of the 2025–26 Macedonian Football Cup.)
5	Tikvesh	33	14	6	13	59	47	+12	48	
6	Arsimi	33	13	7	13	50	53	−3	46	
7	Bashkimi	33	11	9	13	40	54	−14	42	
8	Pelister (R)	33	10	10	13	40	42	−2	40	Qualification for the Macedonian First Football League play-off
9	Brera (R)	33	10	10	13	46	56	−10	40	Qualification for the Macedonian First Football League play-off
10	Makedonija G.P. (R)	33	9	7	17	42	57	−15	34	Relegation to the Macedonian Second League
11	Rabotnički (R)	33	9	6	18	45	58	−13	33	Relegation to the Macedonian Second League
12	Shkupi (R)	33	0	1	32	15	130	−115	1	Relegation to the Macedonian Second League

Source: FFM.mk, MacedonianFootball.com
Rules for classification: 1) Points; 2) Goal difference; 3) Goals scored; 4) Head-to-head points; 5) Head-to-head goal difference; 6) Head-to-head away goals scored (only if two teams); 7) Head-to-head goals scored; 8) Draw; 9) Play-off. (Note: Criteria 2, 3 and 8 is only used if not deciding Champion, teams for UEFA competitions or relegation).
(C) Champions; (R) Relegated

== Results ==
Every team will play three times against each other team for a total of 33 matches. The first 22 matchdays will consist of a regular double round-robin schedule. The league standings at this point will then be used to determine the games for the last 11 matchdays.

Home \ Away	ARS	BAS	APB	MGP	PEL	RAB	SKE	SKU	SIL	STR	TIK	VAR
Arsimi	—	4–2	0–2	1–1	3–3	2–2	3–0	4–2	0–1	1–2	0–5	1–4
Arsimi	—	0–0	—	—	1–0	—	—	5–1	—	1–0	—	1–0
Bashkimi	1–1	—	0–2	2–0	1–0	2–1	1–3	4–1	2–1	0–5	3–1	0–0
Bashkimi	—	—	0–0	3–3	—	1–2	—	—	—	0–4	2–2	0–2
Brera	2–1	1–1	—	1–1	1–2	3–4	2–3	1–0	3–3	0–0	0–4	0–2
Brera	2–1	—	—	1–1	0–1	0–0	—	6–0	—	—	—	—
Makedonija G.P.	4–1	1–1	2–0	—	2–1	3–1	1–3	3–0	1–2	0–2	0–1	1–2
Makedonija G.P.	0–1	—	—	—	—	2–1	0–1	—	4–2	—	0–0	—
Pelister	0–4	1–2	1–0	1–1	—	4–1	0–0	2–0	0–0	1–1	0–0	1–2
Pelister	—	1–0	—	2–0	—	—	—	7–0	—	0–2	—	0–0
Rabotnički	1–0	0–2	3–4	0–0	3–0	—	0–1	3–0	0–3	1–3	0–2	0–3
Rabotnički	2–0	—	—	—	3–3	—	0–3	—	2–0	—	1–3	—
Shkëndija	0–0	2–1	1–1	7–2	2–1	1–0	—	5–1	2–0	2–0	1–0	0–1
Shkëndija	1–0	2–3	2–1	—	1–2	—	—	6–0	—	3–1	—	—
Shkupi	0–3	0–2	1–3	0–2	0–3	1–1	1–2	—	0–3	1–2	0–6	2–4
Shkupi	—	2–3	—	0–4	—	0–7	—	—	—	0–3	—	0–7
Sileks	1–3	0–0	5–0	3–0	3–1	3–1	1–2	5–1	—	1–3	1–0	0–1
Sileks	0–1	1–0	4–0	—	0–0	—	1–1	6–0	—	—	—	—
Struga	4–0	6–0	2–4	2–0	2–0	2–0	1–1	5–0	2–3	—	3–0	1–1
Struga	—	—	0–1	3–0	—	1–2	—	—	2–0	—	1–2	0–1
Tikvesh	3–4	3–0	0–0	2–1	1–0	0–0	1–4	1–0	0–1	0–1	—	1–2
Tikvesh	1–1	—	6–1	—	2–2	—	1–4	6–0	0–3	—	—	—
Vardar	5–1	1–0	2–2	1–0	4–1	3–1	0–1	6–1	2–1	2–2	3–1	—
Vardar	—	—	1–0	5–1	—	1–0	3–0	—	2–1	—	7–0	—

Source: FFM.mk, MacedonianFootball.com
Legend: Blue = home team win; Yellow = draw; Red = away team win.

== Macedonian First Football League play-off ==
The eight-placed and ninth-placed club (Pelister and Brera) faced the second-placed and third-placed clubs from the 2025–26 Macedonian Second Football League (Skopje and Shkëndija 77) for the final two places in the following season's Macedonian First Football League.

31 May 2026
16:30 CEST

Pelister	1–1	Shkëndija 77
Petkovski 90+8'	Report	Nazifi 54'
Penalties
Petrović (penalty scored); Spirovski (penalty scored); Kerim (penalty scored); Angelevski (penalty missed); Ristevski (penalty scored); Mrmachovski (penalty missed); Boshkovski (penalty scored); Petkovski (penalty missed)	5–6	(penalty scored) Sharkoski; (penalty scored) Livareka; (penalty scored) Rushiti; (penalty scored) Dimov; (penalty missed) Nuhija; (penalty missed) Zhoglev; (penalty scored) Adili; (penalty scored) Dervishi

Gradski Stadion, Kavadarci
Referee: Igor Stojchevski (Skopje)

31 May 2026
16:30 CEST

Brera	0–1	Skopje
	Report	Trajchevski 88'

Stadion Petar Miloshevski, Bitola
Referee: Fatmir Bafto (Ohrid)

== Season statistics ==
=== Top scorers ===
As of 25 May 2026.

Rank	Player	Club	Goals
1	(Burkina Faso) Bassirou Compaoré	Struga	17
2	(North Macedonia) Hristijan Maleski	Struga	16
3	(North Macedonia) Azer Omeragić	Vardar	14
4	(Ghana) Emmanuel Avornyo	Bashkimi 1947	12
4	(Uganda) Rogers Mato	Vardar	12
4	(Gabon) Fahd Ndzengue	Brera Strumica & Shkëndija	12
4	(Senegal) Fabrice Tamba	Shkëndija	12
8	(North Macedonia) Besart Ibraimi	Shkëndija	11
8	(Portugal) Miguel Pires	Sileks	11
8	(Albania) Shefit Shefiti	Arsimi	11
8	(Bosnia and Herzegovina) Goran Zakarić	Vardar	11

== See also ==
- 2025–26 Macedonian Football Cup
- 2025–26 Macedonian Second Football League
