= 2024–25 Macedonian Football Cup =

Tournament details
- Country: North Macedonia
- Dates: 18 September 2024 – 21 May 2025
- Teams: 31

Final positions
- Champions: Vardar (6th title)
- Runners-up: Struga

Tournament statistics
- Matches played: 31
- Goals scored: 91 (2.94 per match)

The 2024–25 Macedonian Football Cup was the 33rd season of North Macedonia's football knockout competition. Tikvesh were the defending champions, having won their first cup in the previous year.

Vardar won the cup on 21 May 2025 (their sixth Macedonian Football Cup win), defeating Struga 2–1 in the final.

== Competition calendar ==
Round	Date(s)	Fixtures	Clubs	New entries
First Round	18 September 2024	15	31 → 16	none
Second Round	23 October 2024	8	16 → 8	4
Quarter-finals	26 February 2025	4	8 → 4	none
Semi-finals	9 and 23 April 2025	2	4 → 2	none
Final	21 May 2025	1	2 → 1	none

== First round ==
The draw was held on 20 August 2024. The winners from the previous season (Tikvesh) received a bye.

=== Summary ===
Team 1	Score	Team 2
18 September 2024
Djepchishte (3)	0–8	Shkupi (1)
Kozhuf (2)	1–2	Arsimi (2)
Vardar Negotino (2)	0–4	AP Brera (1)
Yeni Maale (4)	0–5	Shkëndija (1)
Sloboden (4)	0–6	Bregalnica (2)
Ohrid (2)	1–5	Besa (1)
Shkëndija 77 (3)	2–0	Rabotnichki (1)
Karbinci (3)	1–4	Sileks (1)
Borec (2)	0–1	Detonit Plachkovica (2)
Sloga 1934 (3)	1–6	Struga (1)
Skopje (2)	0–1	Pelister (1)
Novaci (2)	0–2	Vardar (1)
2 October 2024
Gostivar (1)	3–1	Pobeda (2)
Belasica (2)	2–2 (4–5 p)	Makedonija G.P. (2)
Bashkimi (2)	0–2	Voska Sport (1)

=== Matches ===
18 September 2024
15:00 CEST

Djepchishte (3)	0–8	Shkupi (1)
	Report	Edmundsson 7', 24', 28'; Ansah 15'; Avornyo 60'; Daci 61', 84'; Diène 90+3'

AMS Stadium, Tetovo
Attendance: 533
Referee: Jordan Jovanovski (Gevgelija)

18 September 2024
15:00 CEST

Kozhuf (2)	1–2	Arsimi (2)
Grozdanoski 90'	Report	Ramadani 47'; S. Shefiti 53'

Gradski stadion, Gevgelija
Attendance: 150
Referee: Nikola Petkovski (Kumanovo)

18 September 2024
15:00 CEST

Vardar Negotino (2)	0–4	AP Brera (1)
	Report	D. Donov 16' (o.g.); Kalanoski 42', 90+1'; Olaosebikan 61'

Sports Center "Pandev", Strumica
Referee: Dejan Mladenovski (Skopje)

18 September 2024
15:00 CEST

Yeni Maale (4)	0–5	Shkëndija (1)
	Report	Latifi 15'; Va. Krstevski 28'; Kocev 38'; Bamba 44'; M. Shefiti 85'

Stadion Petar Miloshevski, Bitola
Referee: Zdravko Kostovski (Shtip)

18 September 2024
15:00 CEST

Sloboden (4)	0–6	Bregalnica (2)
	Report	Abazi 3', 47', 83'; Fejzulai 22', 29'; Vi. Krstevski 31'

Stadion Gorno Lisiche, Skopje
Referee: Plarent Salihi (Tetovo)

18 September 2024
15:00 CEST

Ohrid (2)	1–5	Besa (1)
Dishlievski 16'	Report	Talović 45' (pen.); Selmani 48'; Nuredini 62'; Skenderi 72', 80'

SRC Biljanini Izvori, Ohrid
Referee: Marjan Stojanovski (Kichevo)

18 September 2024
15:00 CEST

Shkëndija 77 (3)	2–0	Rabotnichki (1)
Trpeski 7'; Aliji 86'	Report

Hasanbeg Arena, Skopje
Referee: Darko Kotevski (Bitola)

18 September 2024
15:00 CEST

Karbinci (3)	1–4	Sileks (1)
T. Stojanov 67'	Report	Jasharoski 34'; Rajkov 81'; Dodev 83'; I. Donov 85'

AMS Stadium, Karbinci
Referee: Deni Lekovski (Bitola)

18 September 2024
15:00 CEST

Borec (2)	0–1	Detonit Plachkovica (2)
	Report	O. Hristov 35'

Stadion Zoran Paunov, Veles
Referee: Borche Pavlovikj (Skopje)

18 September 2024
15:00 CEST

Sloga 1934 (3)	1–6	Struga (1)
Ristov 75'	Report	Compaoré 23'; Takahara 45+2', 49'; Tairi 69'; Kamberi 73'; Radeski 83'

Stadion Filip II, Vinica
Referee: Angel Gelov (Kavadarci)

18 September 2024
15:00 CEST

Skopje (2)	0–1	Pelister (1)
	Report	Kerim 73'

Stadion Zhelezarnica, Skopje
Referee: Igor Ivanov (Veles)

18 September 2024
15:00 CEST

Novaci (2)	0–2	Vardar (1)
	Report	Omeragikj 40'; Dongmo 80'

Stadion Novaci, Novaci
Referee: Sashko Ristov (Strumica)

2 October 2024
14:00 CEST

Gostivar (1)	3–1	Pobeda (2)
I. Ivanovski 11' (pen.); Mashike 37'; Ajdini 65'	Report	Gjurchinovski 69'

Stadion Boris Trajkovski, Skopje
Referee: Fatmir Bafto (Ohrid)

2 October 2024
14:00 CEST

Belasica (2)	2–2	Makedonija G.P. (2)
K. Stojanov 48', 54'	Report; Penalties	Markoski 33'; Velkoski 78' (pen.)
Penalties
Jovov (penalty scored); Hristovski (penalty scored); Vojneski (penalty scored); Gligorov (penalty scored); Milushev (penalty missed)	4–5	(penalty scored) S. Hristov; (penalty scored) Velkoski; (penalty scored) Stojchevski; (penalty scored) Temelkov; (penalty scored) Razmoski

Stadion Blagoj Istatov, Strumica
Referee: Angelcho Ristov (Negotino)

2 October 2024
14:00 CEST

Bashkimi (2)	0–2	Voska Sport (1)
	Report	Ibraimi 85'; Klinton 90+6' (pen.)

Gradski stadion, Gostivar
Referee: Kiril Smokvoski (Prilep)

== Second round ==
The draw was held on 4 October 2024.

=== Summary ===
Team 1	Score	Team 2
23 October 2024
AP Brera (1)	2–0	Besa (1)
Vardar (1)	2–0	Tikvesh (1)
Gostivar (1)	1–0	Bregalnica (2)
Pelister (1)	1–1 (1–4 p)	Detonit Plachkovica (2)
Shkëndija (1)	1–0	Shkëndija 77 (3)
Struga (1)	2–0	Makedonija G.P. (2)
Sileks (1)	0–0 (4–3 p)	Shkupi (1)
Arsimi (2)	3–1	Voska Sport (1)

=== Matches ===
23 October 2024
14:00 CEST

AP Brera (1)	2–0	Besa (1)
Milovanovikj 84'; Mato 90+3'	Report

Stadion Blagoj Istatov, Strumica
Referee: Aleksandar Stavrev (Skopje)

23 October 2024
14:00 CEST

Vardar (1)	2–0	Tikvesh (1)
Dianessy 75', 90+3'	Report

Toshe Proeski Arena, Skopje
Attendance: 1,500
Referee: Dimitar Pileshkov (Shtip)

23 October 2024
14:00 CEST

Gostivar (1)	1–0	Bregalnica (2)
Hadji-Kimov 62' (o.g.)	Report

Stadion Boris Trajkovski, Skopje
Referee: Furkan Idrizi (Tetovo)

23 October 2024
14:00 CEST

Pelister (1)	1–1	Detonit Plachkovica (2)
Masevski 76'	Report; Penalties	Trajkoski 9'
Penalties
Ljamchevski (penalty scored); M. Ivanovski (penalty missed); Ristevski (penalty missed)	1–4	(penalty scored) Nastevski; (penalty scored) O. Hristov; (penalty scored) Janev; (penalty scored) Rushiti

Stadion Petar Miloshevski, Bitola
Referee: Aleksandar Uroshevikj (Tetovo)

23 October 2024
14:00 CEST

Shkëndija (1)	1–0	Shkëndija 77 (3)
Ademi 72'	Report

Gradski stadion, Tetovo
Referee: Blagojche Ralevski (Bitola)

23 October 2024
14:00 CEST

Struga (1)	2–0	Makedonija G.P. (2)
Tairi 25'; Kehinde 90+5' (pen.)	Report

Gradska Plazha, Struga
Referee: Marjan Stojanovski (Kichevo)

23 October 2024
14:00 CEST

Sileks (1)	0–0	Shkupi (1)
	Report; Penalties
Penalties
Timovski (penalty scored); Gjorgjievski (penalty scored); Donov (penalty scored); Kochoski (penalty missed); Angjeleski (penalty scored)	4–3	(penalty scored) Edmundsson; (penalty missed) Imeri; (penalty missed) Diène; (penalty scored) Pintér; (penalty scored) Lichina

Gradski stadion, Kratovo
Attendance: 250
Referee: Stojanche Trpchevski (Kavadarci)

23 October 2024
14:00 CEST

Arsimi (2)	3–1	Voska Sport (1)
Avduli 22'; Zekjiri 71'; Ramadani 90+2'	Report	Larson 5'

Gradski stadion, Gostivar
Referee: Ivana Projkovska (Skopje)

== Quarter-finals ==
The draw was held on 10 December 2024.

=== Summary ===
Team 1	Score	Team 2
26 February 2025
Struga (1)	1–0	Gostivar (1)
Detonit Plachkovica (2)	0–1	Shkëndija (1)
AP Brera (1)	1–1 (4–3 p)	Arsimi (2)
Vardar (1)	1–0	Sileks (1)

=== Matches ===
26 February 2025
14:00 CET

Struga (1)	1–0	Gostivar (1)
Kehinde 49'	Report

Gradska Plazha, Struga
Referee: Stojanche Trpchevski (Kavadarci)

26 February 2025
14:00 CET

Detonit Plachkovica (2)	0–1	Shkëndija (1)
	Report	Shala 23'

Gradski stadion, Radovish
Referee: Aleksandar Grujovski (Kichevo)

26 February 2025
14:00 CET

AP Brera (1)	1–1	Arsimi (2)
Ndzengue 15'	Report; Penalties	Taipi 78'
Penalties
Gjorgievski (penalty scored); Taleski (penalty missed); Ndzengue (penalty scored); Z. Ivanovski (penalty scored); Velkov (penalty scored)	4–3	(penalty scored) Cuculi; (penalty missed) Beluli; (penalty missed) Redjepi; (penalty scored) Ramadani; (penalty scored) Gafuri

Stadion Blagoj Istatov, Strumica
Referee: Stojanche Stojanov (Shtip)

26 February 2025
14:00 CET

Vardar (1)	1–0	Sileks (1)
Dongmo 68'	Report

Toshe Proeski Arena, Skopje
Referee: Furkan Idrizi (Tetovo)

== Semi-finals ==
The draw was held on 2 April 2025. The first legs were played on 9 April and the second legs will be played on 23 April 2025.

=== Summary ===
Team 1	Agg.	Team 2	1st leg	2nd leg
Shkëndija (1)	2–3	Struga (1)	1–2	1–1
Vardar (1)	4–1	AP Brera (1)	3–0	1–1

=== Matches ===
9 April 2025
16:00 CEST

Shkëndija (1)	1–2	Struga (1)
Ramadani 36'	Report	Ukpa 53'; Radeski 82'

Gradski stadion, Tetovo
Referee: Stojanche Trpchevski (Skopje)
23 April 2025
16:00 CEST

Struga (1)	1–1	Shkëndija (1)
Ukpa 19'	Report	Radić 90+2' (o.g.)

Gradska Plazha, Struga
Referee: Blagojche Ralevski (Bitola)

Struga won 3–2 on aggregate.

9 April 2025
16:00 CEST

Vardar (1)	3–0	AP Brera (1)
Senghor 26'; Matić 45+1'; Zakarić 56'	Report

Toshe Proeski Arena, Skopje
Referee: Fatmir Bafto (Ohrid)
23 April 2025
16:00 CEST

AP Brera (1)	1–1	Vardar (1)
Jankulovski 34'	Report	Talevski 58'

Stadion Blagoj Istatov, Strumica
Referee: Igor Stojchevski (Skopje)

Vardar won 4–1 on aggregate.

== Final ==
21 May 2025
20:00 CEST

Vardar (1)	2–0	Struga (1)
Talevski 26', 49'	Report 1 Report 2

Toshe Proeski Arena, Skopje
Attendance: 6,000
Referee: Igor Stojchevski (Skopje)

== Season statistics ==
=== Top scorers ===
As of 21 May 2025.

Rank	Player	Club	Goals
1	(North Macedonia) Mihail Talevski	Vardar	3
1	(Canada) Rejjan Abazi	Bregalnica	3
1	(Faroe Islands) Jóan Símun Edmundsson	Shkupi	3
	(North Macedonia) Besmir Daci	Shkupi	2
	(France) Djibril Dianessy	Vardar	2
	(Cameroon) Danel Dongmo	Vardar	2
	(North Macedonia) Amir Fejzulai	Bregalnica	2
	(North Macedonia) Antonio Kalanoski	Gostivar	2
	(Nigeria) Lanre Kehinde	Struga	2
	(North Macedonia) Marjan Radeski	Struga	2
	(North Macedonia) Albin Ramadani	Arsimi	2
	(North Macedonia) Emir Skenderi	Besa	2
	(North Macedonia) Kire Stojanov	Belasica	2
	(North Macedonia) Flamur Tairi	Struga	2
	(Japan) Masaaki Takahara	Struga	2
	(Nigeria) Hogan Ukpa	Struga	2

== See also ==
- 2024–25 Macedonian First Football League
- 2024–25 Macedonian Second Football League
