= 2024–25 Macedonian First Football League =

Macedonian First League
- Season: 2024–25
- Dates: 11 August 2024 – 17 May 2025
- Champions: Shkendija (5th title)
- Relegated: Besa; Gostivar; Voska Sport
- Champions League: Shkendija
- Conference League: Sileks; Rabotnichki; Vardar
- Matches: 198
- Goals: 468 (2.36 per match)
- Top goalscorer: Marko Gjorgjievski; Besart Ibraimi (15 goals)
- All statistics correct as of 24 May 2024.

The 2024–25 Macedonian First League was the 33rd season of the Macedonian First Football League, the highest football league of North Macedonia. It began on 11 August 2024 and ended on 17 May 2025. Struga were the defending champions, having won their second title in 2023–24.

The winners (Shkendija, their fifth title) qualified for the Champions League first qualifying round. The second-placed team (Sileks), third-placed team (Rabotnichki) and 2024–25 Macedonian Football Cup winners (Vardar) qualified for the Conference League first qualifying round. The tenth-placed team (Besa) qualified for the Macedonian First Football League play-off. Two teams (Gostivar and Voska Sport) withdrew from the competition and were banned from entering any league for the season 2025/26.

== Promotion and relegation ==
At the end of the 2023–24 season

Promoted from 2023–24 Second League

- Besa (DD) (winners, promoted for the first time in their history)
- Pelister (runners-up, promoted after a 2-season absence)

Relegated to 2024–25 Second League

- Makedonija G.P. (11th, relegated after a 6 seasons spell in top flight)
- Bregalnica (12th, relegated after a 3 seasons spell in top flight)

At the end of the 2024–25 season

Promoted from 2024–25 Second League

- Makedonija G.P. (winners, promoted after one season absence)
- Arsimi (runners-up, promoted for the first time in their history)
- Bashkimi (Third placed; won play-off, promoted for the first time in their history)

Relegated to 2025–26 Second League

- Besa (DD) (10th; lost play-off, relegated after a single season spell in top flight)
- Gostivar (11th, relegated after a 2 seasons spell in top flight)^{1}
- Voska Sport (12th, relegated after a 2 seasons spell in top flight)^{2}

^{1}Gostivar withdrew from the First League after a leaving of pitch at the 29th round match against Rabotnički.
^{2}Voska Sport withdrew from the First League after a leaving of pitch at the 28th round match against Vardar.

== Participating teams ==
Besa	AP Brera	Shkëndija	Rabotnichki	Sileks
City Stadium Gostivar	Blagoj Istatov Stadium; UEFA	Ecolog Arena	National Arena Toše Proeski; UEFA	Kratovo City Stadium
Capacity: 1,000	Capacity: 9,200	Capacity: 15,000	Capacity: 33,011	Capacity: 1,800
Pelister	Location of teams in 2024–25 Macedonian First League			Struga
Petar Miloshevski Stadium	Location of teams in 2024–25 Macedonian First League			Gradska Plaža Stadium
Capacity: 10,000	Location of teams in 2024–25 Macedonian First League			Capacity: 2,000
Voska Sport	Tikvesh	Vardar	Shkupi	Gostivar
SRC Biljanini Izvori Stadium	Kavadarci City Stadium	National Arena Toše Proeski; UEFA	Čair Stadium	Boris Trajkovski Stadium
Capacity: 3,978	Capacity: 9,000	Capacity: 33,011	Capacity: 4,500	Capacity: 3,000

=== Personnel and kits ===
Note: Flags indicate national team as has been defined under FIFA eligibility rules. Players may hold more than one non-FIFA nationality.

Team	Manager	Captain	Kit manufacturer	Shirt sponsor
AP Brera	(North Macedonia) Panče Stojanov	(North Macedonia) Martin Gjorgievski	Sportika SA	Mozzart
Besa	(North Macedonia) Gorazd Mihajlov	(North Macedonia) Armend Alimi	Jako	Global Immobilien
Gostivar	(Brazil) Mert Nobre	(Turkey) Alper Potuk	Nike	
Pelister	(North Macedonia) Srgjan Zaharievski	(North Macedonia) Mirko Ivanovski	Joma	
Rabotnichki	(North Macedonia) Goran Stanić	(North Macedonia) Egzon Belica	Joma	
Shkëndija	(North Macedonia) Jeton Beqiri	(North Macedonia) Besart Ibraimi	Macron	Ecolog
Shkupi	(Turkey) Alparslan Erdem	(North Macedonia) Hamza Ramani	Reaction	Alagoz Holding
Sileks	(North Macedonia) Aleksandar Vasoski	(Serbia) Ivan Šubert	Macron	Sileks
Struga	(North Macedonia) Ilčo Gjorgioski	(North Macedonia) Bunjamin Shabani	Macron	Trim & Lum
Tikvesh	(North Macedonia) Gjorgji Mojsov	(North Macedonia) Aleksandar Varelovski	Joma	Klimi.mk, Sinalco
Vardar	(North Macedonia) Goce Sedloski	(Bosnia and Herzegovina) Goran Zakarić	Joma	
Voska Sport	(Albania) Klodian Arbëri	(North Macedonia) Agon Hani	Joma	Nefi Ik

== League table ==
Pos	Team	Pld	W	D	L	GF	GA	GD	Pts	Qualification or relegation
1	Shkëndija (C)	33	20	10	3	59	30	+29	70	Qualification for the Champions League first qualifying round
2	Sileks	33	19	10	4	57	19	+38	67	Qualification for the Conference League first qualifying round
3	Rabotnichki	33	15	11	7	38	21	+17	56	Qualification for the Conference League first qualifying round
4	Struga	33	13	12	8	41	37	+4	51	
5	Vardar	33	12	9	12	39	37	+2	45	Qualification for the Conference League first qualifying round (Note: Vardar qualified for the first qualifying round of Conference League as winners of the 2024–25 Macedonian Football Cup.)
6	Pelister	33	10	9	14	26	38	−12	39	
7	Shkupi	33	10	8	15	47	47	0	38	
8	Tikvesh	33	7	13	13	25	33	−8	34	
9	AP Brera	33	9	7	17	41	56	−15	34	
10	Besa (R)	33	9	6	18	34	53	−19	33	Qualification for the Macedonian First Football League play-off
11	Gostivar (Note: Gostivar were deducted 9 points due to the leaving of pitch at the 29th round match against Rabotnički. Later the club withdrew their participation. Since the club failed to appear for the second time in a row, a further nine points were deducted.) (D, R)	33	12	12	9	36	34	+2	30	Withdrew from the league.
12	Voska Sport (Note: Voska Sport were deducted 9 points due to the leaving of pitch at the 28th round match against Vardar. Later the club withdrew their participation. Since the club failed to appear for the second time in a row, a further nine points were deducted.) (D, R)	33	5	7	21	25	63	−38	4	Withdrew from the league.

Source: FFM.mk, MacedonianFootball.com
Rules for classification: 1) Points; 2) Goal difference; 3) Goals scored; 4) Head-to-head points; 5) Head-to-head goal difference; 6) Head-to-head away goals scored (only if two teams); 7) Head-to-head goals scored; 8) Draw; 9) Play-off. (Note: Criteria 2, 3 and 8 is only used if not deciding Champion, teams for UEFA competitions or relegation).
(C) Champions; (D) Disqualified; (R) Relegated

== Results ==
Each team plays every other team three times for a total of 33 matches. For matches 1–22, each team plays every other team twice (home and away). For matches 23–33, each team plays every other team for the third time (either at home or away, depending on league standings).

Home \ Away	APB	BES	GOS	PEL	RAB	SKE	SKU	SIL	STR	TIK	VAR	VOS	APB	BES	GOS	PEL	RAB	SKE	SKU	SIL	STR	TIK	VAR	VOS
AP Brera	—	3–2	0–1	4–0	1–3	0–2	1–2	0–1	1–1	0–0	3–1	1–1	—	—	—	—	3–2	—	4–3	0–2	—	—	0–2	3–0 (Note: Match awarded 3–0 due to withdrawal of Voska Sport from the league.)
Besa	0–1	—	0–0	2–3	0–0	1–3	0–1	0–5	1–2	1–0	2–1	1–0	2–1	—	2–1	—	—	2–3	—	—	3–2	—	—	3–0
Gostivar	4–1	1–1	—	0–0	0–0	3–1	2–0	0–0	1–0	1–0	1–1	4–0	2–2	—	—	0–3 (Note: Match awarded 0–3 due to withdrawal of Gostivar from the league.)	0–3 (Note: Match awarded 0–3 due to Gostivar's players leaving the pitch in the 85th minute, protesting against the referee's decisions.)	0–3	3–1	—	—	—	—	0–2
Pelister	0–0	1–0	1–1	—	0–0	0–1	0–0	1–0	1–1	0–0	1–0	1–0	1–2	1–4	—	—	—	—	—	—	—	1–0	1–3	3–0
Rabotnički	1–1	4–1	1–0	3–0	—	0–0	2–1	1–0	2–0	3–1	0–2	1–0	—	1–0	—	2–1	—	—	—	0–0	0–1	1–0	0–1	—
Shkëndija	4–3	2–1	0–0	2–0	1–1	—	2–0	4–2	1–1	1–0	4–0	5–1	2–1	—	—	1–0	2–1	—	3–3	1–3	—	—	—	4–0
Shkupi	3–1	1–1	0–1	3–1	2–0	1–1	—	0–2	3–1	3–1	3–0	3–3	—	2–3	—	0–1	0–0	—	—	1–2	—	1–1	0–2	—
Sileks	4–0	2–0	1–2	1–0	1–1	0–0	2–1	—	3–1	1–1	1–0	4–1	—	5–0	3–0	0–0	—	—	—	—	0–0	1–1	1–1	—
Struga	2–0	1–0	2–2	1–0	1–0	3–0	0–3	1–4	—	1–0	0–2	2–1	1–1	—	1–1	4–1	—	1–1	0–0	—	—	—	—	1–0
Tikvesh	2–0	0–0	0–0	1–2	0–2	0–0	1–0	0–0	0–1	—	0–3	2–1	2–1	1–0	2–1	—	—	0–1	—	—	3–3	—	—	—
Vardar	0–1	0–0	0–2	1–0	0–0	1–2	3–2	0–1	1–4	1–1	—	1–3	—	3–1	3–0	—	—	1–1	—	—	0–0	2–2	—	—
Voska Sport	3–1	2–0	0–2	1–1	0–2	0–1	3–1	0–3	1–1	0–0	0–0	—	—	—	—	—	1–1	—	0–3	1–2	—	0–3	0–3 (Note: Match awarded 0–3 due to Voska Sport's players leaving the pitch in the 76th minute, protesting against the referee's decisions.)	—

Source: FFM.mk, MacedonianFootball.com
Legend: Blue = home team win; Yellow = draw; Red = away team win.

== Macedonian First Football League play-off ==
The tenth-placed club (Besa) faced the third-placed club from the 2024–25 Macedonian Second Football League (Bashkimi) for the final place in the following season's Macedonian First Football League.

25 May 2025
17:00 CEST

Besa	0–2	Bashkimi
	Report	Saiti 37'; Aleksovski 80'

Gradski Stadion, Kavadarci
Referee: Stojanche Trpchevski (Skopje)

== Season statistics ==
=== Top scorers ===
As of 9 Мay 2025.

Rank	Player	Club	Goals
1	(North Macedonia) Marko Gjorgjievski	Sileks	15
1	(North Macedonia) Besart Ibraimi	Shkëndija	15
3	(Nigeria) Lanre Kehinde	Struga	13
4	(Bosnia and Herzegovina) Adi Alić	Sileks	12
5	(Bosnia and Herzegovina) Goran Zakarić	Vardar	11
6	(North Macedonia) Martin Gjorgievski	AP Brera	9
6	(Serbia) Đorđe Ivković	AP Brera	9
6	(North Macedonia) Remzifaik Selmani	Besa	9
9	(North Macedonia) Fiton Ademi	Shkëndija	8
9	(North Macedonia) Darko Dodev	Sileks	8
9	(Uganda) Rogers Mato	AP Brera & Vardar	8
9	(Albania) Atdhe Mazari	Rabotnichki	8

== Attendances ==
#	Club	Average
1	Shkëndija	2,027
2	Vardar	1,517
3	Pelister	1,223
4	Brera	1,220
5	Shkupi	888
6	Tikveš	698
7	Besa	490
8	Struga	419
9	Rabotnički	335
10	Sileks	259
11	Voska	158
12	Gostivari	97

== See also ==
- 2024–25 Macedonian Football Cup
- 2024–25 Macedonian Second Football League
