= 2023–24 Macedonian First Football League =

Macedonian First League
- Season: 2023–24
- Dates: 6 August 2023 – 18 May 2024
- Champions: Struga; 2nd domestic title
- Relegated: Makedonija G.P. Bregalnica
- Champions League: Struga
- Conference League: Shkendija; Tikvesh
- Matches: 198
- Goals: 446 (2.25 per match)
- Top goalscorer: Aleksa Marušić (17 goals)
- Longest winning run: 4 games AP Brera; Struga; Shkendija; Voska Sport
- Longest unbeaten run: 17 games Gostivar
- Longest winless run: 9 games AP Brera
- Longest losing run: 7 games Makedonija G.P.
- All statistics correct as of 10 March 2024.

The 2023–24 Macedonian First League was the 32nd season of the Macedonian First Football League, the highest football league of North Macedonia. It began on 6 August 2023 and ended on 18 May 2024. Struga were the defending champions, having won their first title in 2022–23.

The winners (Struga, their second consecutive title win) qualified for the Champions League first qualifying round. The second-placed team (Shkendija) and 2023–24 Macedonian Football Cup winners (Tikvesh) qualified for the Conference League first qualifying round. The tenth-placed team (Vardar) qualified for the Macedonian First Football League play-off. The bottom two teams (Bregalnica and Makedonija G.P.) were relegated to the 2024–25 Macedonian Second Football League.

== Promotion and relegation ==
At the end of the 2022–23 season

Promoted from 2022–23 Second League

- Voska Sport (winners, promoted for the first time in their history)
- Gostivar (runners-up, promoted after a 10 season absence)
- Vardar (Third placed; won play-off, promoted after a 2 season absence)

Relegated to 2023–24 Second League

- Skopje (10th; lost play-off, relegated after a 2 seasons spell in top flight)
- Pobeda (11th, relegated after a single season spell in top flight)

At the end of the 2023–24 season

Promoted from 2023–24 Second League

- Besa (DD) (winners, promoted for the first time in their history)
- Pelister (runners-up, promoted after a 2 season absence)

Relegated to 2024–25 Second League

- Makedonija G.P. (11th, relegated after a 6 seasons spell in top flight)
- Bregalnica (12th, relegated after a 3 seasons spell in top flight)

== Participating teams ==
| Bregalnica | AP Brera | Shkendija | Rabotnichki | Sileks |
|---|---|---|---|---|
| Gradski stadion Štip | Blagoj Istatov Stadium; UEFA | Ecolog Arena | National Arena Toše Proeski; UEFA | City Stadium Kratovo |
| Capacity: 4,000 | Capacity: 9,200 | Capacity: 15,000 | Capacity: 36,460 | Capacity: 6,000 |
| | | | | | |
| Makedonija G.P. | Location of teams in 2023–24 Macedonian First League | | | Struga |
| Gjorče Petrov Stadium | Location of teams in 2023–24 Macedonian First League | | | Gradska Plaža Stadium |
| Capacity: 3,000 | Location of teams in 2023–24 Macedonian First League | | | Capacity: 3,000 |
| Voska Sport | Tikvesh | Vardar | Shkupi | Gostivar |
| SRC Biljanini Izvori | Kavadarci City Stadium | Boris Trajkovski Stadium | Čair Stadium | Gostivar City Stadium |
| Capacity: 4,500 | Capacity: 9,500 | Capacity: 3,500 | Capacity: 6,000 | Capacity: 2,500 |

=== Personnel and kits ===
Note: Flags indicate national team as has been defined under FIFA eligibility rules. Players may hold more than one non-FIFA nationality.

| Team | Manager | Captain | Kit manufacturer | Shirt sponsor |
|---|---|---|---|---|
| AP Brera | (Italy) Giovanni Valenti | (North Macedonia) Marko Alchevski | Sportika SA | Mozzart |
| Bregalnica | (North Macedonia) Goran Zdravkov | (Uganda) Halid Lwaliwa | Hummel | Superior |
| Gostivar | (Turkey) Murat Daban | (North Macedonia) Xhelil Abdulla | Nike | |
| Makedonija G.P. | (North Macedonia) Goran Simov | (North Macedonia) Filip Mishevski | Joma | Zlatna Kopacka, Tesla |
| Rabotnički | (North Macedonia) Milan Ilievski | (North Macedonia) Egzon Belica | Joma | |
| Shkendija | (North Macedonia) Jeton Beqiri | (North Macedonia) Ennur Totre | Macron | Ecolog |
| Shkupi | (Bosnia and Herzegovina) Mladen Žižović | (North Macedonia) Artan Iljazi | Reaction | Alagoz Holding |
| Sileks | (North Macedonia) Aleksandar Vasoski | (North Macedonia) Daniel Bozhinovski | Jako | Sileks |
| Struga | (Albania) Shpetim Duro | (North Macedonia) Bunjamin Shabani | Macron | Trim & Lum |
| Tikvesh | (North Macedonia) Gjorgji Mojsov | (North Macedonia) Aleksandar Varelovski | Joma | Klimi.mk, Sinalco |
| Vardar | (North Macedonia) Gorazd Mihajlov | (North Macedonia) Darko Micevski | Joma | |
| Voska Sport | (Montenegro) Miljan Radović | (North Macedonia) Hadis Velii | Joma | Nefi Ik |

== League table ==
| Pos | Team | Pld | W | D | L | GF | GA | GD | Pts | Qualification or relegation |
|---|---|---|---|---|---|---|---|---|---|---|
| 1 | Struga (C) | 33 | 20 | 4 | 9 | 56 | 33 | +23 | 64 (Note: Head-to-head points: Struga 6, Shkëndija 3.) | Qualification for the Champions League first qualifying round |
| 2 | Shkëndija | 33 | 18 | 10 | 5 | 55 | 27 | +28 | 64 | Qualification for the Conference League first qualifying round |
| 3 | Shkupi | 33 | 17 | 11 | 5 | 42 | 23 | +19 | 62 | |
| 4 | Tikvesh | 33 | 12 | 8 | 13 | 41 | 40 | +1 | 44 | Qualification for the Conference League first qualifying round (Note: Tikvesh qualified for the Conference League first qualifying round by winning the 2023–24 Macedonian Football Cup.) |
| 5 | Sileks | 33 | 10 | 13 | 10 | 36 | 40 | −4 | 43 | |
| 6 | Gostivar | 33 | 9 | 15 | 9 | 32 | 38 | −6 | 42 (Note: Head-to-head points: Gostivar 15, AP Brera 12, Rabotnički 10, Voska Sport 8.) | |
| 7 | AP Brera | 33 | 11 | 9 | 13 | 34 | 33 | +1 | 42 | |
| 8 | Rabotnički | 33 | 12 | 6 | 15 | 29 | 34 | −5 | 42 | |
| 9 | Voska Sport | 33 | 10 | 12 | 11 | 37 | 41 | −4 | 42 | |
| 10 | Vardar (O) | 33 | 10 | 7 | 16 | 28 | 43 | −15 | 37 | Qualification for the Macedonian First Football League play-off |
| 11 | Makedonija G.P. (R) | 33 | 8 | 5 | 20 | 29 | 44 | −15 | 29 | Relegation to the Macedonian Second Football League |
| 12 | Bregalnica (R) | 33 | 6 | 10 | 17 | 27 | 50 | −23 | 28 | Relegation to the Macedonian Second Football League |

Source: FFM.mk, MacedonianFootball.com
Rules for classification: 1) Points; 2) Head-to-head points; 3) Head-to-head goal difference; 4) Head-to-head away goals scored; 5) Goal difference; 6) Goals scored; 7) Draw; 8) Play-off.
(C) Champions; (O) Play-off winners; (R) Relegated

== Results ==
For matches 1–22, each team plays every other team twice (home and away). For matches 23–33, each team plays every other team for the third time (either at home or away). The league standings after matches 22 are used to determine the games for the last 11 matchdays.

| Home \ Away | APB | BRE | GOS | MGP | RAB | SKE | SKU | SIL | STR | TIK | VAR | VOS | APB | BRE | GOS | MGP | RAB | SKE | SKU | SIL | STR | TIK | VAR | VOS |
|---|---|---|---|---|---|---|---|---|---|---|---|---|---|---|---|---|---|---|---|---|---|---|---|---|
| AP Brera | — | 1–1 | 0–1 | 3–0 | 0–0 | 0–0 | 0–1 | 1–1 | 2–1 | 2–0 | 1–0 | 2–0 | — | 1–1 | — | 5–3 | 2–1 | — | — | — | — | — | 2–0 | 1–0 |
| Bregalnica | 1–0 | — | 2–1 | 2–3 | 2–1 | 2–2 | 0–0 | 2–1 | 1–3 | 2–1 | 0–0 | 2–2 | — | — | 0–0 | — | 0–1 | — | 1–0 | 1–1 | — | — | 0–3 | — |
| Gostivar | 2–0 | 1–0 | — | 1–0 | 2–0 | 2–2 | 0–0 | 1–2 | 2–1 | 0–3 | 1–1 | 1–1 | 1–1 | — | — | 1–4 | 0–0 | — | 2–0 | — | — | 2–1 | 0–0 | — |
| Makedonija G.P. | 1–0 | 1–0 | 3–0 | — | 0–1 | 0–1 | 0–0 | 1–0 | 0–3 | 1–1 | 0–1 | 1–2 | — | 2–1 | — | — | — | 1–1 | — | — | 0–1 | 1–0 | — | 0–2 |
| Rabotnički | 1–0 | 2–0 | 0–0 | 1–0 | — | 1–2 | 3–1 | 1–0 | 0–0 | 1–0 | 0–1 | 2–0 | — | — | — | 1–1 | — | 0–2 | — | — | 1–2 | 3–1 | 2–0 | — |
| Shkëndija | 1–1 | 2–0 | 2–2 | 1–0 | 2–0 | — | 0–0 | 3–1 | 1–0 | 1–0 | 3–0 | 1–1 | 3–2 | 4–1 | 4–1 | — | — | — | — | 6–1 | 0–2 | — | — | 0–0 |
| Shkupi | 1–0 | 1–0 | 3–1 | 1–0 | 3–0 | 1–0 | — | 1–1 | 2–0 | 0–0 | 2–0 | 3–0 | 0–0 | — | — | 3–1 | 3–2 | 0–2 | — | — | — | 3–2 | 3–0 | — |
| Sileks | 0–1 | 0–0 | 1–1 | 2–2 | 2–0 | 2–1 | 2–1 | — | 0–0 | 1–0 | 3–2 | 4–2 | 2–1 | — | 0–0 | 1–0 | 0–1 | — | 0–0 | — | — | — | 1–1 | — |
| Struga | 1–2 | 2–1 | 2–0 | 2–1 | 1–0 | 2–1 | 2–2 | 2–0 | — | 3–1 | 4–0 | 1–0 | 3–1 | 2–2 | 1–0 | — | — | — | 1–2 | 2–3 | — | — | — | 3–1 |
| Tikvesh | 1–0 | 2–1 | 2–2 | 1–0 | 2–0 | 1–2 | 1–1 | 1–0 | 2–3 | — | 1–0 | 1–1 | 3–1 | 2–1 | — | — | — | 2–1 | — | 1–1 | 3–2 | — | — | 0–0 |
| Vardar | 1–0 | 2–0 | 0–2 | 2–1 | 1–0 | 0–2 | 0–1 | 2–2 | 1–3 | 2–0 | — | 1–2 | — | — | — | 1–0 | — | 1–1 | — | — | 1–0 | 2–2 | — | 0–1 |
| Voska Sport | 1–1 | 2–0 | 1–1 | 2–1 | 3–2 | 0–1 | 2–3 | 0–0 | 0–1 | 0–3 | 3–2 | — | — | 4–0 | 1–1 | — | 1–1 | — | 0–0 | 2–1 | — | — | — | — |

Source: FFM.mk, MacedonianFootball.com
Legend: Blue = home team win; Yellow = draw; Red = away team win.
For upcoming matches, an "a" indicates there is an article about the rivalry between the two participants.

== Macedonian First Football League play-off ==
The tenth-placed club (Vardar) faced the third-placed club from the 2023–24 Macedonian Second Football League (Detonit Plachkovica) for the final place in the following season's Macedonian First Football League.

26 May 2024
17:00 CEST

| Vardar | 2–0 | Detonit Plachkovica |
|---|---|---|
| Đurić 42'; Šušnjara 45+1' |

Blagoj Istatov Stadium, Strumica
Referee: Jovan Kachevski (Struga)

== Season statistics ==
=== Top scorers ===
As of 20 May 2024.

| Rank | Player | Club | Goals |
|---|---|---|---|
| 1 | (Montenegro) Aleksa Marušić | Voska Sport | 17 |
| 2 | (North Macedonia) Besart Ibraimi | Struga | 15 |
| 2 | (North Macedonia) Marjan Radeski | Struga | 15 |
| 4 | (Bosnia and Herzegovina) Almir Aganspahić | Shkëndija | 12 |
| 4 | (Nigeria) Lanre Kehinde | Gostivar | 12 |
| 6 | (North Macedonia) Ediz Spahiu | Tikvesh & Gostivar | 10 |
| 7 | (North Macedonia) Marko Gjorgjievski | Sileks | 9 |
| 7 | (North Macedonia) Antonio Kalanoski | Sileks | 9 |
| 9 | (North Macedonia) Alen Jasharoski | Voska Sport | 8 |
| 9 | (Kosovo) Adenis Shala | Shkëndija | 8 |

== See also ==
- 2023–24 Macedonian Football Cup
- 2023–24 Macedonian Second Football League
