= KF Bashkimi =

KF Bashkimi may refer to one of two football clubs based in Kumanovo, North Macedonia:

- KF Bashkimi (1947–2008)
- KF Bashkimi 1947, founded 2009
