= Ristevski =

Ristevski (Macedonian: Ристевски) is a Macedonian-language surname. Notable people with the surname include:

- Aleksandar Ristevski, Macedonian footballer
- Antonio Ristevski, Macedonian alpine skier
- Kire Ristevski, Macedonian footballer
