= Boban Georgiev =

Macedonian footballer (born 1997)

Personal information
- Full name: Boban Georgiev
- Date of birth: 26 January 1997 (age 29)
- Place of birth: Štip, Macedonia
- Height: 1.77 m (5 ft 9 1/2 in)
- Position: Left winger

Team information
- Current team: Pelister
- Number: 70

Youth career
- Metalurg Skopje

Senior career*
Years	Team	Apps	(Gls)
2014–2015	Metalurg Skopje	2	(0)
2016–2017	Bregalnica	31	(6)
2017–2019	Sileks	63	(10)
2019–2020	Radnik Surdulica	17	(3)
2020–2021	Borac Banja Luka	13	(0)
2021–2022	Bregalnica Štip	31	(2)
2022–2023	Leotar	23	(1)
2023–2024	Voska Sport	28	(1)
2024-2025	Pelister	14	(0)
2025–	Arsimi		

International career
2013	Macedonia U17	3	(0)
2017	Macedonia U21	4	(0)
- * Club domestic league appearances and goals as of 1 June 2024

Boban Georgiev (Macedonian: Бобан Георгиев; born 26 January 1997) is a Macedonian professional footballer who plays as a left winger for Pelister.

== Club career ==
Born in Štip, Georgiev made his senior debut with Metalurg Skopje in the 2014–15 Macedonian First Football League season but at time was still mostly used in the youth championship. In 2016, he signed with hometown club Bregalnica, where his patience of being mostly a reserve during the first season (two appearances only), paid off, as in the 2016–17 season he became a standard first-team player and scored 6 goals in 29 appearances. However, the Macedonian league is formed of just 10 teams, and Bregalnica was relegated as it finished 9th, so Georgiev's boost during the season made it highly improbable for the young talent to play in the second league.

In the summer of 2017, he signed with Sileks, a mid-table team. Despite interest of bigger clubs, those were giving priority to experienced players, while Sileks granted him playtime since the very beginning. After another mid-table season, Georgiev enjoyed being a regular and making another consecutive season with 29 league appearances. His position in Sileks grew even stronger in the second season in the club by making 34 league appearances crowned with 8 goals. His performance didn't passed unnoticed, and, despite Sileks avoided relegation at the play-offs, Georgiev felt it was time for new greater challenges, and by end of June 2019, he signed with Serbian side Radnik Surdulica. Georgiev's signing was soon followed by his compatriot Nikola Bogdanovski, and the joined the already well established Zoran Danoski. Georgiev made his debut for Radnik in a 4–0 home victory against Spartak Subotica, scoring two goals.

On 2 September 2020, he signed a two-year contract with Bosnian Premier League club Borac Banja Luka. Georgiev made his official debut for Borac nine days later, on 11 September, in a league game against Sarajevo. He scored his first goal for Borac in a cup game against Travnik on 30 September 2020. Georgiev won his only trophy with Borac on 23 May 2021, getting crowned Bosnian Premier League champions one game before the end of the 2020–21 season. He left Borac after his contract with the club expired in June 2021.

== International career ==
Georgiev made his international debut in 2013 for the Macedonia U17 national team at the 2013 UEFA European Under-17 Championship qualifiers. At the time he hadn't even made his senior debut at club level, but his talent stood up. Afterwards, an option to choose mid-table Macedonian clubs such as Bregalnica or Sileks to gain more playing time, cost Georgiev to sacrifice to fight for the national team spots, which inevitably coaches gave preference to either foreign-based, or big clubs reserves talents. However, his performance in 2017 was impossible to be ignored and he returned to the national team, this time the U21 national team in their 2017 UEFA European Under-21 Championship qualifiers.

== Career statistics ==
=== Club ===
As of match played 2 April 2021.

Appearances and goals by club, season and competition
Club	Season	League			Cup		Continental		Other		Total	
Club	Season	Division	Apps	Goals	Apps	Goals	Apps	Goals	Apps	Goals	Apps	Goals
Metalurg Skopje	2014–15	Macedonian First League	2	0	0	0	1	0	—		3	0
Bregalnica	2015–16	Macedonian First League	2	0	0	0	—		—		2	0
Bregalnica	2016–17	Macedonian First League	29	6	3	1	—		—		32	7
Bregalnica	Total		31	6	3	1	—		—		34	7
Sileks	2017–18	Macedonian First League	29	2	0	0	—		—		29	2
Sileks	2018–19	Macedonian First League	34	8	2	0	—		1 (Note: Appearances in 2018–19 Macedonian First Football League relegation play-off)	2	37	10
Sileks	Total		63	10	2	0	—		1	2	66	12
Radnik Surdulica	2019–20	Serbian SuperLiga	17	3	3	2	—		—		20	5
Borac Banja Luka	2020–21	Bosnian Premier League	13	0	2	1	1	0	—		16	1
Career total			126	19	10	4	2	0	1	2	139	25

== Honours ==
Borac Banja Luka

- Bosnian Premier League: 2020–21
