= Qëndrim Ismajli =

Kosovar professional footballer (born 1999)

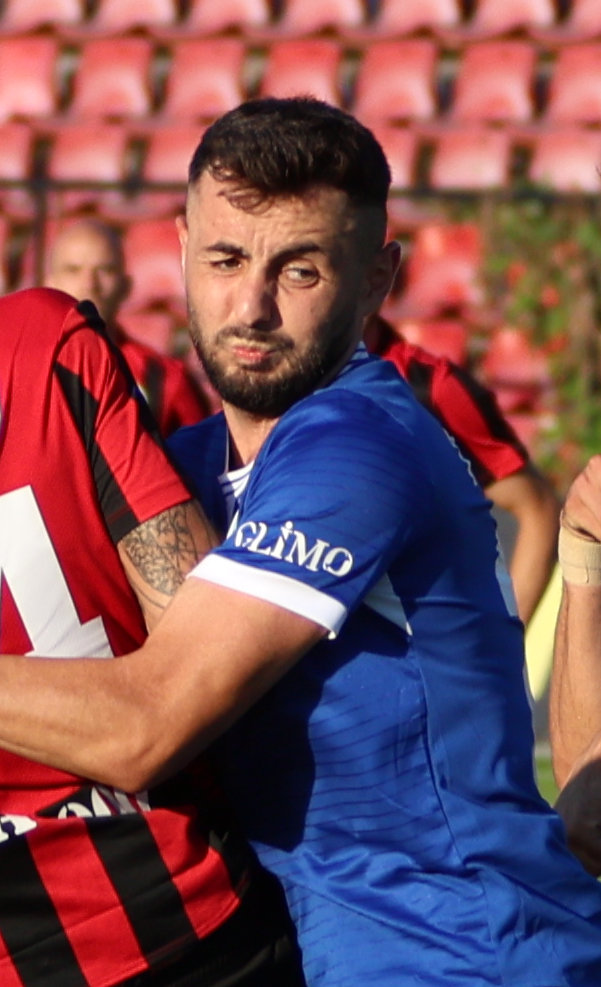

Personal information
- Full name: Qëndrim Ismajli
- Date of birth: 23 May 1999 (age 27)
- Place of birth: Kamenica, FR Yugoslavia
- Height: 1.80 m (5 ft 11 in)
- Position: Left-back

Team information
- Current team: Struga
- Number: 28

Youth career
- –2018: Gjilani

Senior career*
Years	Team	Apps	(Gls)
2018–2020	Gjilani	1	(0)
2019–2020	→ Dardana (loan)	4	(0)
2020–2021	Dardana	8	(0)
2021–2022	Gjilani	1	(0)
2022–2023	Flamurtari	13	(2)
2023–2024	Gjilani	26	(4)
2024–2026	Tirana	34	(3)
2026	Teuta	15	(0)
2026–	Struga	2	(0)
- * Club domestic league appearances and goals as of 13 October 2026

Qëndrim Ismajli (born 23 May 1999) is a Kosovan professional footballer who plays as a left-back for Struga.

== Club career ==
=== Second return to Gjilani ===
On 18 August 2023, Ismajli returned to Kosovo Superleague side Gjilani. His debut with Gjilani came three days later against Prishtina after being named in the starting line-up.

=== Tirana ===
On 14 June 2024, Ismajli joined Kategoria Superiore side Tirana. He was scheduled to be part of Tirana since the first match of the 2024–25 UEFA Conference League first qualifying round against Torpedo Kutaisi, but due to visa problems he was unable to participate. His debut with Tirana came on 18 July in the second match of the 2024–25 UEFA Conference League first qualifying round against Torpedo Kutaisi after coming on as a substitute at 80th minute in place of Fatmir Prengaj.
