= Besmir Bojku =

Macedonian footballer

Personal information
- Date of birth: 3 January 1995 (age 31)
- Place of birth: Velešta, Macedonia
- Height: 1.76 m (5 ft 9 in)

Team information
- Current team: Struga

Youth career
- 2001–2009: Veleshta
- 2009–2013: Makedonija G.P.

Senior career*
Years	Team	Apps	(Gls)
2013–2014	Makedonija G.P.	27	(1)
2014	Rabotnichki	5	(0)
2014–2015	Shkëndija	18	(0)
2015–2015	→ Shkupi	8	(0)
2016–2019	Shkëndija	63	(7)
2019–2021	→ Feronikeli	61	(4)
2021–	Struga	119	(5)

International career
2013	Macedonia U19	5	(0)
2013	Macedonia U21	3	(0)
2014	Macedonia	1	(0)
- * Club domestic league appearances and goals as of 18 June 2026

Besmir Bojku (born 3 January 1995) is a Macedonian professional footballer who plays as a Midfielder for Struga.

== Club career ==
=== Early career ===
He started his youth career for the local football club Veleshta and joined in 2009 Makedonija G.P. where he made his professional debut.

=== Struga ===
In June 2021, Bojku joined Struga of the Macedonian First Football League.

== Honours ==
Shkëndija

- Macedonian First Football League: 2017–18, 2018–19

Struga

- Macedonian First Football League: 2022–23, 2023–24
