= Mario Mladenovski =

Northern Macedonian footballer

Personal information
- Full name: Mario Mladenovski
- Date of birth: 16 September 2000 (age 26)
- Place of birth: Skopje, North Macedonia
- Height: 1.92 m (6 ft 4 in)
- Position: Centre-back

Team information
- Current team: Varaždin
- Number: 13

Youth career
- –2017: Metalurg Skopje
- 2017–2018: Vardar

Senior career*
Years	Team	Apps	(Gls)
2018–2020	Vardar	9	(0)
2020–2021	Fremad Amager	5	(0)
2021–2022	Botev Plovdiv II	4	(0)
2021–2022	Botev Plovdiv	11	(0)
2021–2022	→ Makedonija Gjorce Petrov (loan)	22	(1)
2022–2024	Shkupi	35	(2)
2024–	Varaždin	35	(0)

International career^{‡}
2021–2022	North Macedonia U21	11	(0)
2019–	North Macedonia	6	(0)
- * Club domestic league appearances and goals as of 15 June 2026 ‡ National team caps and goals as of 16 November 2026

Mario Mladenovski (Macedonian: Марио Младеновски; born 16 September 2000) is a Macedonian footballer who plays as a centre-back for Croatian club Varaždin and for the North Macedonia national team.

== Club career ==
On 20 August 2020 it was confirmed, that Mladenovski had left FK Vardar to join Danish 1st Division club Fremad Amager, signing a deal until June 2023.

== International career ==
Mladenovski made his international debut for North Macedonia on 16 November 2019 in a UEFA Euro 2020 qualifying match against Austria.

== Career statistics ==
=== International ===
As of 16 November 2019

North Macedonia
Year	Apps	Goals
2019	1	0
Total	1	0
