= Ibraimi =

Ibraimi is a surname. Notable people with the surname include:

- Agim Ibraimi (born 1988), Macedonian footballer
- Besart Ibraimi (born 1986), Albanian footballer
