= Artan Iljazi =

Macedonian footballer (born 1999)

Personal information
- Date of birth: 24 February 1999 (age 27)
- Place of birth: Kumanovo, Macedonia
- Height: 1.91 m (6 ft 3 in)
- Position: Goalkeeper

Team information
- Current team: Ballkani
- Number: 1

Youth career
- –2017: Milano Kumanovë
- 2017–2018: Shkëndija

Senior career*
Years	Team	Apps	(Gls)
2018–2020	Shkëndija	2	(0)
2018–2019	→ Gostivari (loan)		
2020–2025	Shkupi	57	(0)
2025–	Ballkani	49	(0)

International career
2016	Macedonia U19	1	(0)
- * Club domestic league appearances and goals as of 22 June 2026

Artan Iljazi (born 24 February 1999) is a Macedonian professional footballer who plays as a goalkeeper for Kosovo Superleague club Ballkani.

== Club career ==
=== Early career and Shkëndija ===
Iljazi began his football career in his hometown with Milano Kumanovë. In 2017, he joined the youth academy of Shkëndija, one of Macedonia's leading clubs, where he continued his development toward professional football.

==== Loan to Gostivari ====
For the 2018–19 season, Iljazi was loaned to Gostivari to gain regular first‑team playing time, aiding his transition to senior professional football.

=== Shkupi ===
On 25 June 2020, Iljazi signed with Shkupi in the Macedonian First League. Over subsequent seasons, he became a regular member of the squad as Shkupi competed near the top of the league.

Iljazi was part of the Shkupi team that won the Macedonian First League title in the 2021–22 season, marking a major achievement in the club's history.

=== Ballkani ===
In January 2025, Iljazi transferred to Ballkani in the Kosovo Superleague. The move was reported by multiple regional sports outlets as a key signing for the reigning Kosovan champions. He quickly established himself as the club’s first‑choice goalkeeper and featured prominently in league matches.

== International career ==
Iljazi represented Macedonia at under‑19 level, earning one cap in 2016 while competing in youth international fixtures.

== Honours ==
Shkupi

- Macedonian First League: 2021–22
