= Atdhe Mazari =

Albanian footballer

Personal information
- Date of birth: 2 June 2001 (age 25)
- Place of birth: Struga, Macedonia
- Height: 1.76 m (5 ft 9 in)
- Position: Winger

Team information
- Current team: Elbasani
- Number: 19

Youth career
- –2019: Shkëndija
- 2019–2020: Struga

Senior career*
Years	Team	Apps	(Gls)
2020–2021	Struga	7	(0)
2021–2022	Ohrid	1	(0)
2022–2023	Pobeda	16	(4)
2023–2025	Rabotnichki	63	(18)
2025–2026	Varaždin	5	(0)
2025–2026	→ Shkëndija (loan)	19	(3)
2026–	Elbasani	10	(6)

International career
2017	Albania U17	4	(0)
- * Club domestic league appearances and goals as of 18 June 2026

Atdhe Mazari (born 2 June 2001) is a professional footballer who plays as a winger for Elbasani. Born in Macedonia, he represented Albania at the under-17 international level.

== Club career ==
=== Varaždin ===
In January 2025, Mazari joined Varaždin of the Croatian League.

==== Loan at Shkëndija ====
On 20 August 2025, he was loaned to Shkëndija of the Macedonian First Football League.

== International career ==
On 18 October 2017, Mazari was granted Albanian citizenship, which made him eligible to represent Albania at international level and to be selected for the youth national teams. In the same period, he featured for the Albania U17 during the 2018 UEFA European Under-17 Championship qualification campaign.

== Honours ==
Pobeda Prilep

- Macedonian Second League: 2021–22
