= Marko Gjorgjievski =

Macedonian footballer

Personal information
- Date of birth: 18 April 2000 (age 26)
- Place of birth: Skopje, Macedonia
- Height: 1.89 m (6 ft 2 1/2 in)
- Position: Striker

Team information
- Current team: Shkëndija
- Number: 99

Youth career
- 2014–2016: Vardar
- 2016–2017: SSK Nova

Senior career*
| Years | Team | Apps | (Gls) |
| 2017–2019 | Borec | 43 | (24) |
| 2019–2022 | Voždovac | 16 | (3) |
| 2020–2021 | → Radnički Pirot (loan) | 26 | (7) |
| 2021–2022 | → Shkupi (loan) | 26 | (4) |
| 2022 | Akademija Pandev | 13 | (0) |
| 2023–2025 | Sileks | 69 | (30) |
| 2025 | CFR Cluj | 4 | (0) |
| 2025–2026 | Hermannstadt | 24 | (2) |
| 2026– | Shkëndija | 1 | (0) |

International career^{‡}
| 2015 | Macedonia U15 | 2 | (0) |
| 2017–2018 | Macedonia U18 | 3 | (1) |
| 2018 | Macedonia U19 | 6 | (2) |
| 2019–2022 | Macedonia U21 | 12 | (3) |
| 2026– | North Macedonia | 1 | (0) |
- * Club domestic league appearances and goals as of 26 July 2026 ‡ National team caps and goals as of 16 November 2026

Marko Gjorgjievski (Macedonian: Марко Ѓорѓиевски, born 18 April 2000) is a North Macedonian professional footballer who plays as a striker for 1. MFL club Shkëndija and the North Macedonia national team.

== Career ==
Born in Skopje he played for the youth teams of Vardar and SSK Nova. In August 2017 he transferred to second division side Borec where he played for their first team, and over the 2 years that he stayed there he scored a total of 24 goals over 43 games that he played. In the summer of 2019, Marko moved to Serbia as a talented Macedonian youth team member, by joining Voždovac. Following summer, he moved on loan to Serbian side Radnički Pirot. On 1st of June 2025, Romanian powerhouse CFR Cluj announced the signing of Gjorgieivski on a free transfer.

== Career statistics ==
=== International ===
As of match played 16 November 2026

Appearances and goals by national team and year
| National team | Year | Apps | Goals |
|---|---|---|---|
| North Macedonia | 2026 | 1 | 0 |
| Total | | 1 | 0 |

== Honours ==
Borec

- 2. MFL - East: 2018–19

Shkupi

- 1. MFL: 2021–22

CFR Cluj

- Supercupa României runner-up: 2025

Individual

- 1. MFL top scorer: 2024–25 (shared with Besart Ibraimi)
