= Mario Vrdoljak =

Croatian footballer

Personal information
- Date of birth: 21 July 1993 (age 33)
- Place of birth: Livno, Republic of Bosnia and Herzegovina
- Height: 1.87 m (6 ft 2 in)
- Position: Midfielder

Team information
- Current team: Nardò
- Number: 5

Youth career
- –2012: HNK Šibenik
- 2012: Zrinjski Mostar

Senior career*
Years	Team	Apps	(Gls)
2012	Zrinjski Mostar	0	(0)
2013	Junak Sinj	13	(1)
2013	Troglav Livno	9	(0)
2014–2015	SV Zweckel	18	(0)
2015	Zadar		
2015	Imotski	1	(0)
2016	Primorac Biograd		
2016–2017	Olimpik	24	(0)
2017–2018	Bisceglie	30	(0)
2018–2019	Francavilla	24	(0)
2019–2020	Picerno	29	(0)
2020–2022	Grosseto	51	(1)
2022	Academica Clinceni	13	(0)
2023–2024	AP Brera	29	(2)
2024	Concordia Chiajna	9	(1)
2024–	Nardò	11	(1)
- * Club domestic league appearances and goals as of 17 November 2024

Mario Vrdoljak (born 21 July 1993) is a Croatian professional footballer who plays as a midfielder for Italian Serie D club Nardò.

== Club career ==
Born in Livno, Vrdoljak started his career in clubs of Bosnia and Herzegovina and Croatia.

=== Serie C ===
For the 2017–18 season, he moved to Italy to Serie C club Bisceglie.

On 9 August 2018, he signed with Serie C club Francavilla.

After one season in Francavilla, on 19 July 2019 he moved to Picerno.

On 16 September 2020, he joined Serie C club Grosseto.

On 13 February 2022, he moved to Romania, and signed with Liga I club Academica Clinceni.
