= Jeton Beqiri =

Macedonian coach and former footballer

Personal information
- Date of birth: 18 June 1982 (age 44)
- Place of birth: Bogovinje,SR Macedonia,SFR Yugoslavia

Team information
- Current team: Gabala

Managerial career
- Years: Team
- 2008–2012: Drita Bogovinë
- 2012–2013: Gostivari
- 2013: Drita Bogovinë
- 2014–2015: Shkëndija (assistant)
- 2015: Shkëndija
- 2015–2016: Shkëndija (assistant)
- 2016: Shkëndija
- 2017: Shkëndija (youth)
- 2017–2018: Flamurtari (assistant)
- 2018: Renova
- 2018–2020: Struga
- 2021–2022: Bylis
- 2022–2023: Al-Jabalain (TD)
- 2024–2026: Shkëndija
- 2026–: Gabala

Jeton Beqiri (born 18 June 1982) is a Macedonian professional football coach and former footballer. He is the head coach of Gabala in the Azerbaijan Premier League and has held multiple roles at the club, including head coach, assistant coach, and youth coach. Beqiri has also managed clubs in North Macedonia, Albania, and Saudi Arabia.

== Managerial career ==
=== Early career ===
Beqiri began his managerial career with Drita Bogovinë in 2008, where he remained until 2012. During this period, he gained experience in senior football management at domestic level.

He was appointed head coach of Gostivari for the 2012–13 season before returning briefly to Drita Bogovinje in 2013.

=== Shkëndija ===
Beqiri has had several spells at KF Shkëndija. He initially joined the club as an assistant coach in 2014 and was promoted to head coach in 2015. After a further period as assistant coach, he again served as head coach in 2016.

In 2017, Beqiri worked within Shkëndija’s youth system, contributing to player development and maintaining continuity with the club’s sporting philosophy.

In 2024, he was reappointed head coach of Shkëndija.

=== Other clubs ===
Beqiri has also worked outside North Macedonia. He served as assistant coach at KF Flamurtari in Albania during the 2017–18 season, before returning to manage KF Renova in 2018.

Later in 2018, he was appointed head coach of Struga, a position he held until 2020. From 2021 to 2022, he managed Albanian club KF Bylis Ballsh.

In 2022, Beqiri joined Saudi Arabian club Al-Jabalain FC as technical director, a role he held until 2023.

On 16 September 2026, Azerbaijan Premier League club Qabala announced the appointment of Beqiri as their new head coach, commencing 20 September 2026, to a one-year contract with the option of an additional two season.

== Coaching profile ==
Beqiri is known for his emphasis on tactical organisation and the development of young players. His repeated appointments at Shkëndija reflect the club’s confidence in his familiarity with its competitive and organisational structure.

== Honours ==
Shkëndija

- Macedonian First Football League: 2024–25

Bylis

- Kategoria e Parë: 2021–22
