= Bunjamin Shabani =

Macedonian footballer

Personal information
- Full name: Bunjamin Shabani
- Date of birth: 30 January 1991 (age 35)
- Place of birth: Kumanovo, SFR Yugoslavia
- Height: 1.74 m (5 ft 9 in)
- Position: Midfielder

Team information
- Current team: Struga
- Number: 11

Senior career*
Years	Team	Apps	(Gls)
2006–2008	Bashkimi	13	(6)
2008	Milano Kumanovo	0	(0)
2009–2010	Oulun PA	6	(3)
2010–2012	Shkupi	30	(1)
2012–2014	Shkëndija	49	(2)
2014–2015	Partizani Tirana	18	(0)
2015–2017	Renova	41	(2)
2017–2018	Shkupi	43	(6)
2018–2019	Shirak	25	(1)
2019–2020	Drita	28	(1)
2020–	Struga	167	(28)

International career
2006–2007	Macedonia U17	3	(3)
2008–2009	Macedonia U19	4	(1)
- * Club domestic league appearances and goals as of 18 June 2026

Bunjamin Shabani (born 30 January 1991 in Kumanovo) is a Macedonian footballer of Albanian descent who plays for Struga.

== Club career ==
=== Partizani ===
Shabani followed coach Shpëtim Duro on his way out of Shkëndija to Albanian Superliga side Partizani Tirana ahead of the 2014–15 season.

== Honours ==
- Macedonian First Football League: 2022–23, 2023–24
