= Emmanuel Avornyo =

Ghanaian footballer

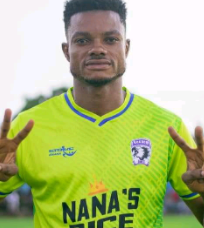

Personal information
- Full name: Emmanuel Avornyo
- Date of birth: 3 May 2001 (age 25)
- Place of birth: Ghana
- Position: Forward

Team information
- Current team: Bashkimi
- Number: 80

Senior career*
Years	Team	Apps	(Gls)
2019–2021	Unistar Academy		
2021–2023	Bechem United	68	(11)
2024–2025	KF Shkupi	36	(7)
2025–	Bashkimi	29	(12)
- * Club domestic league appearances and goals as of 18 June 2026

Emmanuel Avornyo (born 3 May 2001) is a Ghanaian footballer who currently plays as a forward for Macedonian First Football League side Bashkimi.

== Career ==
Avornyo joined Bechem United on 7 August 2021 ahead of the 2021–22 season. He scored two goals on the first match of the season against Medeama. It was also his first 2 goals ever in the Ghana Premier League
