= FK Voska Sport =

Association football club in North Macedonia

Voska Sport
- Full name: Fudbalski Klub Voska Sport
- Founded: 2019; 7 years ago
- Ground: SRC Biljanini Izvori Stadium
- Capacity: 3,980
- Chairman: Nefi Useini
- Manager: Klodian Arbëri
- 2024–25: Macedonian First League, 12th (withdrew from the league)
Home colours	Away colours

FK Voska Sport (Macedonian: ФК Воска Спорт) was a football club based in the city of Ohrid, North Macedonia. The club most recently competed in the Macedonian First League, the top tier of Macedonian football.

== History ==
The club was founded in 2019.

== Current squad ==
As of 25 June 2025

Note: Flags indicate national team as defined under FIFA eligibility rules; some limited exceptions apply. Players may hold more than one non-FIFA nationality.

No.	Pos.	Nation	Player
3	DF	MKD	Agon Hani (captain)
7	FW	MKD	Abdulhadi Jahja
8	MF	MKD	Xhemil Jahiji
11	FW	MKD	David Mateski (on loan from Sileks)
13	GK	MKD	Kristijan Kitanovski
15	DF	MKD	Hristijan Dragarski
17	FW	MKD	Leo Andreski

No.	Pos.	Nation	Player
18	DF	MKD	Bilal Iseni
19	FW	MKD	Darko Grozdanoski
23	DF	MKD	Tome Kitanovski
27	MF	MKD	Fikri Dani
28	DF	MKD	Andrej Richkov
77	MF	MKD	Donart Ibraimi
99	FW	MKD	Ilirid Ademi

=== Youth players ===
Players from the U19 Youth Team that have been summoned with the first team in the current season.

Note: Flags indicate national team as defined under FIFA eligibility rules; some limited exceptions apply. Players may hold more than one non-FIFA nationality.

No.	Pos.	Nation	Player
35	GK	MKD	Mihail Blazhevski

== Honours ==
- Macedonian Second Football League
  - Winners (1): 2022–23
  - Runners-up (1): 2021–22
- Macedonian Third Football League
  - Winners (1): 2020–21
- Macedonian Football Cup
  - Runners-up (1): 2023–24

== Season-by-season records ==
Season	League									Cup	Top goalscorer	
Season	Division	Pld	W	D	L	GF	GA	Pts	Pos.	Cup	Player	Goals
2019–20 (Note: The 2019–20 and 2020–21 seasons were abandoned due to the COVID-19 pandemic in Macedonia.)	OFL Ohrid	9	8	1	0	37	6	25	10th			
2020–21	3. MFL Southwest	20	18	2	0	69	25	56	1st ↑		Naser Doko	11
2021–22	2. MFL West	27	18	5	4	51	14	59	2nd	R1	Izair Emini	15
2022–23	2. MFL	30	23	6	1	84	25	75	1st ↑	R2	Behar Feta	29
2023–24	1. MFL	33	10	12	11	37	41	42	9th	RU	Aleksa Marušić	17
2024–25 (Note: Voska Sport were deducted 9 points due to the leaving of pitch at the 28th round match against Vardar. Later the club withdrew their participation.)	1. MFL	33	5	7	21	25	63	13	9th ↓↓	R2	Abdulhadi Jahja; Clinton Osei	6

Key
↑	Promoted
↓	Relegated

- R1 = First round
- R2 = Second round
- RU = Runners-up
