= Lanre Kehinde =

Nigerian footballer

Personal information
- Full name: Olanrewaju Kehinde
- Date of birth: 7 May 1994 (age 32)
- Place of birth: Lagos, Nigeria
- Height: 1.94 m (6 ft 4 1/2 in)
- Position: Forward

Team information
- Current team: Sloga Doboj
- Number: 20

Youth career
- Dominion Hotspur

Senior career*
| Years | Team | Apps | (Gls) |
| 2011–2012 | Dominion Hotspur | | |
| 2011–2012 | → Kwara United (loan) | | |
| 2012–2015 | Maccabi Tel Aviv | 0 | (0) |
| 2013–2014 | → Hakoah Amidar (loan) | 28 | (8) |
| 2014–2015 | → Hapoel Afula (loan) | 32 | (20) |
| 2015–2016 | Hapoel Kfar Saba | 16 | (1) |
| 2016 | Hapoel Acre | 10 | (4) |
| 2016–2017 | Al-Fujairah | 0 | (0) |
| 2017 | → Elazığspor (loan) | 16 | (8) |
| 2017–2019 | Ankaragücü | 32 | (7) |
| 2019 | Denizlispor | 15 | (10) |
| 2019–2020 | Incheon United | 17 | (1) |
| 2021–2022 | Ümraniyespor | 23 | (5) |
| 2022 | Menemen | 14 | (0) |
| 2022–2023 | Hapoel Nof HaGalil | 23 | (11) |
| 2023–2024 | Gostivari | 23 | (12) |
| 2024–2025 | Struga | 27 | (13) |
| 2025–2026 | Al-Zulfi | 8 | (2) |
| 2026– | Sloga Doboj | 5 | (0) |

International career
| | Nigeria U17 | 1 | (0) |
| | Nigeria U18 | 1 | (0) |
- * Club domestic league appearances and goals as of 20 September 2026

Olanrewaju "Lanre" Kehinde (born 7 May 1994) is a Nigerian footballer who plays as a forward for Bosnian Premier League club Sloga Doboj.

== Career ==
=== Club ===
Kehinde's career started in Nigeria with Dominion Hotspur, who he joined Kwara United on loan from in 2011 before leaving in 2012 to join Israeli Premier League side Maccabi Tel Aviv. He didn't make a first-team appearance for Maccabi, but was loaned out twice to Liga Leumit clubs. Firstly to Hakoah Amidar Ramat Gan for the 2013–14 season and secondly to Hapoel Afula for the following season, 2014–15. In total, Kehinde scored 28 goals in 60 appearances across the two loan spells. He left Maccabi permanently in 2015 and subsequently had spells with Premier League teams Hapoel Kfar Saba and Hapoel Acre.

In July 2016, Kehinde joined UAE First Division League club Al-Fujairah. After six months in the United Arab Emirates, Kehinde left to join TFF First League side Elazığspor on loan.

On 8 September 2025, Kehinde joined Saudi FDL club Al-Zulfi.

=== International ===
Kehinde has represented Nigeria at U17 and U18 level, making an appearance apiece.

== Career statistics ==
As of match played 20 September 2026

Appearances and goals by club, season and competition
| Club | Season | League | | | National cup (Note: Includes Israel State Cup, Turkish Cup, Macedonian Cup) | | Continental | | Other | | Total | |
| Club | Season | Division | Apps | Goals | Apps | Goals | Apps | Goals | Apps | Goals | Apps | Goals |
|---|---|---|---|---|---|---|---|---|---|---|---|---|
| Hakoah Amidar (loan) | 2013–14 | Liga Leumit | 28 | 8 | — | | — | | — | | 28 | 8 |
| Hapoel Afula (loan) | 2014–15 | Liga Leumit | 32 | 20 | 5 | 4 | — | | — | | 37 | 24 |
| Hapoel Kfar Saba | 2015–16 | Israeli Premier League | 16 | 1 | 2 | 0 | — | | — | | 18 | 1 |
| Hapoel Acre | 2015–16 | Israeli Premier League | 10 | 4 | — | | — | | — | | 10 | 4 |
| Elazığspor (loan) | 2016–17 | TFF First League | 16 | 8 | — | | — | | — | | 16 | 8 |
| Ankaragücü | 2017–18 | TFF First League | 24 | 7 | — | | — | | — | | 24 | 7 |
| Ankaragücü | 2018–19 | Süper Lig | 8 | 0 | 4 | 2 | — | | — | | 12 | 2 |
| Ankaragücü | Total | | 32 | 7 | 4 | 2 | — | | — | | 36 | 9 |
| Denizlispor | 2018–19 | TFF First League | 15 | 10 | — | | — | | — | | 15 | 10 |
| Incheon United | 2019 | K League 1 | 14 | 1 | — | | — | | — | | 14 | 1 |
| Incheon United | 2020 | K League 1 | 3 | 0 | — | | — | | — | | 3 | 0 |
| Incheon United | Total | | 17 | 1 | — | | — | | — | | 17 | 1 |
| Ümraniyespor | 2020–21 | TFF First League | 9 | 5 | — | | — | | — | | 9 | 5 |
| Ümraniyespor | 2021–22 | TFF First League | 14 | 0 | 2 | 0 | — | | — | | 16 | 0 |
| Ümraniyespor | Total | | 23 | 5 | 2 | 0 | — | | — | | 25 | 5 |
| Menemen | 2021–22 | TFF First League | 14 | 0 | — | | — | | — | | 14 | 0 |
| Hapoel Nof HaGalil | 2022–23 | Liga Leumit | 23 | 11 | 1 | 0 | — | | 1 (Note: Appearance in the 2022–23 Liga Leumit promotion/relegation playoff) | 0 | 25 | 11 |
| Gostivar | 2023–24 | Macedonian First League | 23 | 12 | — | | — | | — | | 23 | 12 |
| Struga | 2024–25 | Macedonian First League | 27 | 13 | 4 | 2 | 3 (Note: One appearance in UEFA Champions League, two appearances in UEFA Conference League) | 0 | — | | 34 | 15 |
| Al-Zulfi | 2025–26 | Saudi First Division League | 8 | 2 | — | | — | | — | | 8 | 2 |
| Sloga Meridian | 2026–27 | Bosnian Premier League | 5 | 0 | 0 | 0 | — | | — | | 5 | 0 |
| Career total | | | 289 | 102 | 18 | 8 | 3 | 0 | 1 | 0 | 311 | 110 |
