= Aleksandar Ristevski =

Macedonian footballer (born 1992)

Personal information
- Date of birth: 11 May 1992 (age 34)
- Place of birth: Prilep, Republic of Macedonia
- Height: 1.86 m (6 ft 1 in)
- Position: Defender

Team information
- Current team: Pelister
- Number: 4

Youth career
- FK Pelister

Senior career*
Years	Team	Apps	(Gls)
2010–2012	Pelister	24+	(0+)
2012–2013	Skopje		
2013–2014	Metalurg		
2014–2016	Mladost CD	7+	(0+)
2016–2017	Pobeda	45	(1)
2018	Pelister	9	(1)
2018	Renova	3	(0)
2019	Pobeda	9	(1)
2019	Vllaznia	4	(0)
2020–2021	Struga	27	(0)
2021–2022	Rabotnički	15	(3)
2022	FC Prishtina	0	(0)
2022–2023	Bregalnica	27	(3)
2023–2024	AP Brera	28	(1)
2024–	Pelister	43	(7)
- * Club domestic league appearances and goals as of 25 May 2026

Aleksandar Ristevski (Macedonian: Александар Ристевски) (born 11 May 1992) is a Macedonian footballer who plays as a defender for Pelister in the Macedonian First Football League.
