= Azer Omeragić =

Macedonian footballer

Azer Omeragikj
Personal information
- Date of birth: 14 July 2002 (age 24)
- Place of birth: Skopje, North Macedonia
- Position: Centre-forward

Team information
- Current team: Vardar
- Number: 9

Youth career
- Vardar
- 2020–2021: Hajduk Split

Senior career*
Years	Team	Apps	(Gls)
2021–2022	Borec	6	(0)
2022	Shkupi	3	(0)
2022–2023	Skopje	24	(2)
2023–	Vardar	102	(19)

International career^{‡}
2019	North Macedonia U17	2	(0)
2026–	North Macedonia	7	(0)
- * Club domestic league appearances and goals as of 17:25, 2 June 2026 (UTC) ‡ National team caps and goals as of 23:58, 16 November 2026 (UTC)

Azer Omeragikj (Азер Омерагиќ; born 14 July 2002) is a Macedonian professional footballer who plays as a centre-forward for Vardar in the Macedonian First Football League and the North Macedonia national team.

== Club career ==
Born in Skopje, Omeragikj came through Vardar's youth academy before joining Hajduk Split in Croatia as a teenager, after being spotted by the Croatian club's scouts during Vardar's pre-season preparations in Turkey. He was unable to break into the first team and returned to North Macedonia in February 2021, joining Borec, where he suffered a serious injury that kept him out for an extended period.

Following his injury at Borec, Omeragikj signed for Scupi in January 2022, where coach Goce Sedloski gave him the opportunity to train and regain his match fitness. He subsequently joined Skopje in September 2022, making 24 league appearances and scoring two goals during the 2022–23 season.

In August 2023, Omeragikj joined Vardar as a free agent, returning to the club where he had developed as a youth player. In the 2023–24 season he made 32 league appearances scoring two goals, before significantly improving his output in 2024–25 with six goals in 29 appearances.

In the 2025–26 season Omeragikj emerged as Vardar's key attacking threat, scoring 10 goals in the league and captaining the side in European competition. He was voted player of the first half of the season by Vardar fans in an Instagram poll conducted by the club, having scored 11 goals across all competitions by the winter break. He was also named player of the round for his performances in the league.

Omeragikj also featured prominently in Vardar's UEFA Conference League campaign. He opened the scoring against La Fiorita from San Marino in the first qualifying round on 10 July 2025, converting a precise header in the 47th minute as Vardar won 3–0. He then scored the decisive second goal against Lausanne-Sport in the second qualifying round on 24 July 2025, giving Vardar a 2–1 aggregate lead ahead of the return leg in Switzerland.

== International career ==
Omeragikj represented North Macedonia at under-17 level in 2019, making two appearances in UEFA Under-17 Championship qualifying.

In May 2026, Omeragikj was named in the North Macedonia senior squad by coach Goce Sedloski for friendly matches against Bosnia and Herzegovina and Turkey, one of five debutants included in the selection. He made his senior debut in the match against Bosnia and Herzegovina before starting against Turkey in Istanbul on 1 June 2026, lining up alongside Bojan Miovski and Elif Elmas in attack.

== Personal life ==
Omeragikj was born and raised in Skopje. He is the son of Masar Omeragikj, president of the Football Federation of North Macedonia.

== Honours ==
Shkupi

- Macedonian First Football League: 2021–22

Vardar

- Macedonian Football Cup: 2024–25
- Macedonian First Football League: 2025–26
