= Armend Alimi =

Macedonian association football player

Personal information
- Date of birth: 11 December 1987 (age 38)
- Place of birth: Kumanovo, SR Macedonia, SFR Yugoslavia
- Height: 1.80 m (5 ft 11 in)
- Position: Midfielder

Team information
- Current team: Bashkimi
- Number: 10

Youth career
- 2000–2006: Bashkimi

Senior career*
Years	Team	Apps	(Gls)
2005–2007	Bashkimi	56	(18)
2007–2009	Milano Kumanovo	46	(15)
2009–2011	Istra 1961	60	(4)
2011	Örebro	18	(0)
2012	Nea Salamis	20	(1)
2013–2014	Ermis Aradippou	41	(8)
2014–2021	Shkendija	206	(47)
2021–2023	Rabotnički	25	(0)
2023–2025	Besa Dobërdoll	29	(1)
2025–	Bashkimi	27	(0)

International career^{‡}
2008	Macedonia U21	11	(1)
2009–2016	Macedonia	14	(0)
- * Club domestic league appearances and goals as of 18 June 2026 ‡ National team caps and goals as of 29 March 2016

Armend Alimi (Macedonian: Арменд Алими; born 11 December 1987) is a Macedonian professional footballer who plays for Bashkimi and the Macedonia national team.

== Career ==
His contract with Croatian club Istra 1961 was terminated by mutual consent in November 2011. Alimi also plays for the North Macedonia national football team.

He was the youngest captain of all time in Bashkimi. He debuted for the Macedonian senior national team in a World Cup qualifier in September 2009 against Norway in Oslo.
