= Gorazd Mihajlov =

Macedonian football manager and player (born 1974)

Personal information
- Date of birth: 21 August 1974 (age 52)
- Place of birth: Skopje, SR Macedonia, SFR Yugoslavia
- Height: 1.78 m (5 ft 10 in)
- Position: Midfielder

Team information
- Current team: Besa Dobërdoll (manager)

Youth career
- 1984–1991: Vardar

Senior career*
Years	Team	Apps	(Gls)
1992–1993	Wismut Aue	5	(0)
1994	Publikum Celje	6	(0)
1994–1995	Kočevje	7	(0)
1995	Ljungskile	1	(0)
1996–1997	Hvidovre	4	(0)
1997–1998	Vardar		
1998–1999	Čukarički		
1999–2000	Pelister	7	(0)
2000–2002	Milano Kumanovo		
2002–2004	Nea Kallikratia		
2004–2005	Lokomotiva Skopje		
2005–2007	Höttur		

International career
- Yugoslavia U19
- Macedonia U21

Managerial career
- 2006-2011: Höttur
- 2012: Ohrid
- 2012: Pelister
- 2013: Teteks
- 2013: Napredok
- 2014: Rudar Prijedor
- 2014: Al-Qadisiyah (assistant)
- 2015: Teteks
- 2016: Pelister
- 2016–2017: Hatta Club (assistant)
- 2017–2018: Al Dhafra (assistant)
- 2018-2021: Borec
- 2021-2023: Sileks
- 2023–2024: Vardar
- 2024–2025: AP Brera Strumica
- 2025–: Besa Dobërdoll
- * Club domestic league appearances and goals

Gorazd Mihajlov (Macedonian: Горазд Михајлов, born 21 August 1974) is a Macedonian football coach and former player who is the manager of Besa Dobërdoll.

He has coached numerous clubs in Europe and Middle East, and has also coached the Macedonia women's national football team.

== Club career ==
Born in Skopje, SR Macedonia, he played with FK Vardar, FK Pelister, FK Kumanovo and FK Skopje in Macedonia, before moving to Germany to play with Chemnitzer FC. He played with German side Wismut Aue in the season 1992–93. During the winter break of the season 1993–94 he left Chemnitzer and signed with Publikum Celje playing with them in the 1993–94 Slovenian PrvaLiga. Next summer he moved to another Slovenian top-fligh club, NK Kočevje. After Slovenia, his next stop was Scandinavia, first with Ljungskile SK in the 1995 Swedish Division 1 and next with Hvidovre IF in the 1996–97 Danish Superliga then with FK Čukarički in the First League of FR Yugoslavia, before returning to Macedonia to play with FK Pelister in the 1999–2000 First Macedonian Football League.

== International career ==
Mihajlov was also member of the Yugoslav U19 and Macedonian U21 teams.

== Managerial career ==
Mihajlov started his coaching career in Iceland with Höttur.

- Sep 2006-Dec 11: Höttur
- Jan 2012-Mar 12: Ohrid
- Jul 2012-Nov 12: Pelister
- Apr 2012-Apr 13: Macedonia Women
- Mar 2013-Jul 13: Teteks
- Jul 2013-Feb 14: Napredok
- Feb 2014-Mar 14: Rudar Prijedor
- Jun 2014-Jan 15: Al-Qadisiyah FC (assistant)
- Jan 2015-May 16: Teteks
- Jul 2016-Oct 16: Pelister
- Oct 2016-Nov 17: Hatta Club (assistant)
- Jan 2018-Jun 18: Al Dhafra FC (assistant)
- Jul 2018-Jan 21: Borec
- Jun 2021-Dec 23: Sileks
- Dec 2023-: Vardar

== Honours ==
=== As coach ===
Teteks

- Macedonian Cup: 2012–13
