= Ecolog International =

Supply chain management company

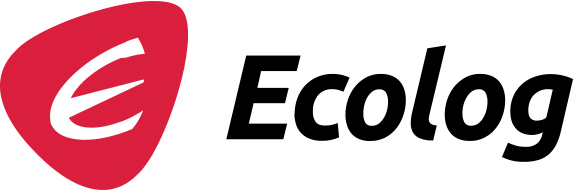
- Type: Private
- Founder: Nazif Destani
- Headquarters: Dubai, United Arab Emirates
- Key people: Mel Brooks (CEO)
- Number of employees: 12,000 (2020)
- Parent: ND Group
- Website: ecolog-international.com/en/

Ecolog International is a global provider of integrated services and rapid response solutions, operating across multiple sectors and some of the world’s most remote and challenging locations. For over 25 years, the company has enabled clients to mobilize faster, reduce operational risk, streamline complex logistics, and remain focused on their operations. Ecolog is headquartered in Dubai, United Arab Emirates. With local presence in 5 continents, the company has presence in more than 50 countries and over 150 locations worldwide.

== History ==
Ecolog International was founded in 1999 by Nazif Destani after discovering German soldiers conducting a NATO engagement for the KFOR mission lacked proper laundry services. The company started with laundry services for the German forces (Bundeswehr) and expanded into a wide variety of services to government, commercial entities and non-profit organizations. By 2005, the company established a headquarters in Dusseldorf, Germany, and reached €131 million in sales. In 2007, Destani stepped down from managing day-to-day operations of Ecolog but maintained oversight as the chairman of the company. Destani was succeeded as CEO by António Gonçalves, Paul Broekhuijesen, Adil Toubia in 2017, and, Ali Vezvaei mid 2019 and Andy Vargoczky early 2022. In 2024, Ecolog appointed Mel Brooks as CEO.

Ecolog International is part of ND Group, a private equity and holding company established in 2008 and headquartered in the Netherlands.

Its subsidiary ND Industrial Investments B.V. became the majority shareholder in German EV producer Next.e.GO Mobile SE in September 2020. In July 2022, Next.e.GO Mobile announced that it would go public in a SPAC deal with Athena Consumer Acquisition Athena SPACs vehicle that would value the company at $913 million. It was announced that the merged company would be listed on the New York Stock Exchange.

== Operations ==
Ecolog International's infrastructure includes air service, logistics, fuel, water, catering, storage, construction, industrial services and facility management, disinfection and cleaning, laundry, mobile lavatories, energy supply and waste management, all of which are widely used by oil and gas and mining operations as well as government and defence contractors, humanitarian and non-governmental organizations (NGO), including the United Nations. The company has been contracted to work with the Royal Dutch Shell, Samsung, Petronas, Weatherford International, and Qatar Gas, as well as the U.S. Army, the United Nations, the UK Ministry of Defence, the Bundeswehr, NATO and the French Army. The company operates under the guidelines set by the ISO9001, ISO14001, and OHSAS 18001 ISO Certifications. Ecolog underwent a due diligence process in 2018 and was certified by Trace International and is a supporter of the ten principles of the United Nations’ Global Compact by adopting sustainable and socially responsible policies on human rights, labor, environment and anti-corruption.

=== Corporate leadership ===
In mid-2019, oil and gas executive Ali Vezvaei joined Ecolog International as the group CEO and the CEO of the management board. In June 2024, Ecolog International appointed Mel Brooks as CEO.

=== Philanthropy ===
Ecolog partnered with the United States Agency for International Development Small Business Expansion Project to launch the Support Fund For Women and Youth Entrepreneurs in 2014 to create more jobs in the Polog region of North Macedonia. In March 2017, the company partnered with the German Embassy to donate a variety of trees to the Center for Culture in Tetovo, North Macedonia. In December 2018, the company donated computers to create a computer lab at the University of Bangui in the Central African Republic. Ecolog donated mobile school facilities in the Al Nasr community, Iraq, located 50 km away from Baghdad.

On 26 November 2019, northwestern Albania was struck by a powerful earthquake that killed and injured many citizens. Ecolog responded by offering transportation and donating supplies to rescue workers. In April 2020, the company donated thousands of electronic devices to students in various parts of North Macedonia to support distance learning in the wake of the COVID-19 pandemic.

=== Sponsorships ===
Since 2013, the company has sponsored KF Shkëndija football club in Tetovo, North Macedonia. In 2016, the company took the club's home stadium, Tetovo City Stadium, under concession and aimed to renovate the stadium but ended up only adding seating and floodlights that enabled the stadium to host international matches. In May 2024 the rebuilding of the stadium started but soon it stopped and the second largest staduim in North Macedonia was left ‘paralyzed’ because of political reasons. The stadium was renamed Ecolog Arena in July 2016.

== Criticisms ==
Between 2006 and 2009, the German press raised concerns about the company's use of a laundry detergent that gave German soldier's uniforms a pink tint (visible at night), as well as issues with black water and diesel fuel. The matter was investigated by Ecolog in conjunction with Germany's Ministry of Defense, which determined that the issues were minor and had been resolved.

In 2017, the company terminated the driver who was found to have accepted bribes to transport civilians in the Central African Republic.

== Awards and recognition ==
In 2019, the company publicized its Communication on Progress of its commitments to the UN Global Compact. The company received a gold award from the Royal Society for the Prevention of Accidents (RoSPA) in 2017 and 2018 for its safety and security protocols. It was also recognised by RoSPA with the Gold Award in 2020. In 2026, Ecolog received the RoSPA Gold Medal Award in the Occupational Achievement category, marking its seventh consecutive Gold Award. In June 2026, Ecolog was named Hospitality and Catering Sector Winner at the British Safety Council’s International Safety Awards 2026 and has achieved a Distinction, the highest of the three award grades for exemplary health, safety, and well-being management.
