= Marjan Radeski =

Macedonian professional footballer (born 1995)

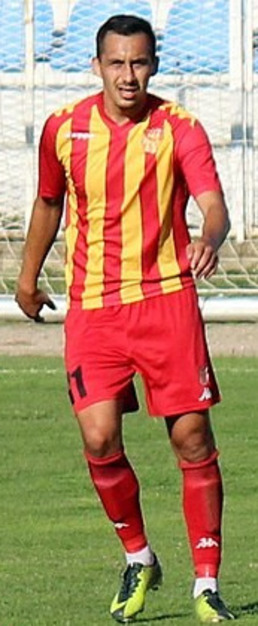

Personal information
- Full name: Marjan Radeski; Марјан Радески
- Date of birth: 10 February 1995 (age 31)
- Place of birth: Prilep, Macedonia
- Height: 1.80 m (5 ft 11 in)
- Position: Right winger

Team information
- Current team: Struga
- Number: 14

Youth career
- 2006–2012: 11 Oktomvri

Senior career*
Years	Team	Apps	(Gls)
2011–2012	11 Oktomvri	10	(1)
2012–2015	Metalurg	81	(20)
2015–2020	Shkëndija	134	(33)
2020–2021	Akademija Pandev	31	(7)
2021–2022	Shkupi	30	(6)
2022–2023	Pyunik	7	(0)
2023–	Struga	107	(27)

International career^{‡}
2013	Macedonia U19	3	(0)
2014–2017	Macedonia U21	21	(4)
2014–	North Macedonia	17	(1)
- * Club domestic league appearances and goals as of 18 June 2026 ‡ National team caps and goals as of 4 April 2021

Marjan Radeski (Macedonian: Марјан Радески; born 10 February 1995) is a Macedonian professional footballer who plays for Struga as a winger.

== Club career ==
Radeski kicked off his career with FK 11 Oktomvri in 2011, before being transferred to FK Metalurg a season later. In 2013, he won the Young player of the season award.

On 3 July 2022, Armenian Premier League club Pyunik announced the signing of Marjan Radeski. On 29 December 2022, Pyunik announced that Radeski had left the club.

On 16 January 2023, Struga announced the signing of Radeski.

== International career ==
On 18 June 2014, Radeski made his international debut against China where he was substituted in for Blaže Todorovski in the 73rd minute. On 29 May 2016, Radeski scored his first international goal against Azerbaijan in Austria. As of April 2020, he has earned a total of 16 caps, scoring 1 goal.

=== International goals ===
As of match played 29 May 2016. Macedonia score listed first, score column indicates score after each Radeski goal.

International goals by date, venue, cap, opponent, score, result and competition
No.	Date	Venue	Cap	Opponent	Score	Result	Competition
1	29 May 2016	Sportplatz Bad Erlach, Bad Erlach, Austria	6	Azerbaijan	1–0	3–1	Friendly

== Honours ==
=== Club ===
Shkendija

- Macedonian Football Cup: 2015–16

FC Struga Trim–Lum

- Macedonian First Football League: 2023–24
