= Bassirou Compaoré =

Burkinabé footballer

Personal information
- Date of birth: 23 April 1998 (age 28)
- Height: 1.88 m (6 ft 2 in)
- Position: Forward

Team information
- Current team: Struga
- Number: 33

Senior career*
Years	Team	Apps	(Gls)
2015–2017	AS SONABEL		
2017	Ittihad Tanger	10	(0)
2017–2018	Chabab Atlas Khénifra	15	(4)
2018–21	Club Africain	31	(8)
2021–2022	Rayo Majadahonda	2	(0)
2022	Tudelano	13	(1)
2022–2023	Talavera	5	(0)
2023	→ Don Benito (loan)	19	(2)
2023–	Struga	75	(26)

International career^{‡}
2017–	Burkina Faso	3	(0)
- * Club domestic league appearances and goals as of 18 June 2026 ‡ National team caps and goals as of 15:12, 15 December 2021 (UTC)

Bassirou Compaoré (born 23 April 1998) is a Burkinabé international footballer who plays for North Macedonia club Struga, as a forward.

== Career ==
He played for AS SONABEL, Ittihad Tanger, Chabab Atlas Khénifra and Club Africain.

He made his international debut for Burkina Faso in 2017.
