= Simeon Hristov =

Macedonian footballer

Personal information
- Date of birth: 4 September 1992 (age 34)
- Place of birth: Skopje, Macedonia
- Height: 1.83 m (6 ft 0 in)
- Position: Forward

Team information
- Current team: Pelister

Youth career
- –2010: Vardar

Senior career*
Years	Team	Apps	(Gls)
2010	Vardar	10	(1)
2010–2011	Vasas		
2011–2013	Egri	23	(1)
2013	→ Pelister (loan)	13	(1)
2013–2014	Bregalnica Štip	12	(0)
2014–2015	Teteks	21	(3)
2015–2017	Gorno Lisiče		
2017–2018	Southern Myanmar		
2018	Makedonija GP		
2018–2020	Borec	15	(3)
2020	Vllaznia	4	(0)
2020–2022	Tikvesh	37	(17)
2022	Rabotnički	5	(0)
2022–2023	Vardar	14	(4)
2023	Gostivar		
2023–	Pelister	0	(0)

International career^{‡}
2012–2013	North Macedonia U21	8	(0)
- * Club domestic league appearances and goals as of 9 December 2022 ‡ National team caps and goals as of 30 July 2020

Simeon Hristov (born 4 September 1992) is a Macedonian footballer who plays as a forward.

== Career ==
=== Vllaznia ===
In January 2020, Hristov signed with Albanian club Vllaznia on a free transfer. He made his debut in official competition for the club on 21 January 2020, starting in a 2–0 home victory over Flamurtari. Hristov would make just four more competitive appearances for the club before departing, appearing in league matches against Laçi, Bylis, and Teuta Durrës, alongside a Cup appearance against Flamurtari.
