= Fahd Ndzengue =

Gabonese footballer

Personal information
- Full name: Fahd Richard Ndzengue Moubeti
- Date of birth: 7 July 2000 (age 26)
- Place of birth: Libreville, Gabon
- Height: 1.70 m (5 ft 7 in)
- Positions: Winger; forward

Team information
- Current team: Shkëndija
- Number: 9

Youth career
- 2007–2017: Mounana

Senior career*
Years	Team	Apps	(Gls)
2017–2018	Mounana		
2019–2023	Tabor Sežana	80	(9)
2023	Primorje	6	(0)
2025	AP Brera Strumica	30	(14)
2026–	Shkëndija	16	(4)

International career^{‡}
2016–2017	Gabon U17		
2020–	Gabon	3	(0)
- * Club domestic league appearances and goals as of 18 June 2026 ‡ National team caps and goals as of 3 May 2023

Fahd Richard Ndzengue Moubeti (born 7 July 2000) is a Gabonese professional footballer who plays as a winger for Shkëndija.

== Club career ==
Ndzengue is a youth product of Mounana, and experienced international club football in the CAF Champions League and CAF Confederation Cup with the first team. He joined Tabor Sežana in 2019, and made his club debut in a 2–0 Slovenian PrvaLiga loss to Olimpija on 10 November 2019.

== International career ==
Ndzengue debuted for the Gabon national team in a 2–1 2021 Africa Cup of Nations qualification loss to the Gambia on 16 November 2020.

At the youth level he played in the 2017 Africa U-17 Cup of Nations (and its qualifiers).
