= FC Struga =

Struga Trim & Lum
- Full name: Football club Struga Trim & Lum
- Founded: 2015; 11 years ago
- Ground: Gradska Plaža Stadium
- Capacity: 2,000
- Chairman: Arbtrim Qyra
- Manager: Bledi Shkëmbi
- League: Macedonian First League
- 2025–26: Macedonian First League, 3rd of 12
- Website: fcstruga.com
Home colours	Away colours

FC Struga Trim & Lum (Macedonian: ФК Струга Трим & Лум, Latin: KF Struga Trim & Lum) is a professional football club based in Struga, North Macedonia. They are currently competing in the Macedonian First League.

== History ==
FC Struga Trim & Lum was founded in August 2015 by the renowned company "Trim & Lum," a leader in the construction and real estate sectors. The club emerged as a serious and ambitious project, committed to building a football team that would adhere to the highest standards, even though they began their journey in the Fourth League, also known as the Municipal League. From the outset, FC Struga Trim & Lum invested in modern training methods and professional infrastructure, signaling their intent to rise through the ranks of Macedonian football.

Their efforts bore fruit in the 2016–17 season when the club finished first in the Third League, securing direct promotion to the Macedonian Second League. In the same season, FC Struga Trim & Lum also clinched the OFS Struga Cup, marking the beginning of their competitive success.

On 28 November 2017, continuing their winning streak, FC Struga Trim & Lum triumphed in the Independence Cup held in Korçë. The club defeated Tirana 1–0 in the semi-finals, thanks to a header from Migjen Sherifi, and went on to win the final against Otrant-Olympic from Ulcinj after a penalty shoot-out (4–1).

Their breakthrough into the top tier of Macedonian football was cemented in the 2022–23 season when FC Struga Trim & Lum won the Macedonian First Football League title for the first time. On 7 May 2023, FC Struga Trim & Lum secured the championship following a decisive 3–0 victory over FK Sileks. Demonstrating their dominance, FC Struga Trim & Lum successfully defended their title in the 2023–24 season, becoming back-to-back Macedonian First Football League champions, further establishing themselves as a rising force in the league.

== Honours ==
- (North Macedonia) Macedonian First League
  - Winners (2): 2022–23, 2023–24
- (North Macedonia) Macedonian Second League
  - Winners (1): 2018–19
- (North Macedonia) Macedonian Third League
  - Winners (1): 2016–17

== Recent seasons ==
Season	League									Cup	European competitions		Top goalscorer	
Season	Division	P	W	D	L	F	A	Pts	Pos	Cup	European competitions		Player	Goals
2015–16	OFL Struga	21	18	1	2	52	16	55	1st ↑					
2016–17	3. MFL Southwest	26	17	8	1	68	16	59	1st ↑					
2017–18	2. MFL West	27	13	6	8	44	30	45	4th	R2				
2018–19	2. MFL West	27	15	9	3	42	17	54	1st ↑	R1				
2019–20^{1}	1. MFL	23	6	7	10	19	28	25	10th	N/A			Hristijan Kirovski	5
2020–21	1. MFL	33	15	12	6	39	24	57	3rd	SF			Marjan Altiparmakovski	7
2021–22	1. MFL	33	12	11	10	33	33	47	6th	SF	Conference League	QR1	Nemanja Bosančić	8
2022–23	1. MFL	30	20	8	2	53	19	68	1st	RU			Besart Ibraimi	19
2023–24	1. MFL	33	20	4	9	56	33	64	1st	R2	Champions League; Conference League	QR1; PO	Besart Ibraimi; Marjan Radeski	15
2024–25	1. MFL	33	13	12	8	41	37	51	4th	RU	Champions League; Conference League	QR1; QR2	Lanre Kehinde	15
2025–26	1. MFL	33	19	5	9	68	28	62	3rd	QF			Bassirou Compaoré	17

^{1}The 2019–20 season was abandoned due to the COVID-19 pandemic in North Macedonia.

== European record ==
Season	Competition	Round	Club	Home	Away	Agg.
2021–22	UEFA Europa Conference League	1QR	(Latvia) Liepāja	1–4	1–1	2–5
2023–24	UEFA Champions League	1QR	(Lithuania) Žalgiris	1–2	0–0	1–2
2023–24	UEFA Europa Conference League	2QR	(Montenegro) Budućnost Podgorica	1–0	4–3	5–3
2023–24	UEFA Europa Conference League	3QR	(Luxembourg) Swift Hesperange	3–1	1–2	4–3
2023–24	UEFA Europa Conference League	PO	(Iceland) Breiðablik	0–1	0–1	0–2
2024–25	UEFA Champions League	1QR	(Slovakia) Slovan Bratislava	1–2	2–4	3–6
2024–25	UEFA Conference League	2QR	(Armenia) Pyunik	2–1	1–3	3–4

Notes

- PO: Play-off
- QR: Qualifying round

== Players ==
=== Current squad ===
As of 1 August 2026

Note: Flags indicate national team as defined under FIFA eligibility rules; some limited exceptions apply. Players may hold more than one non-FIFA nationality.

No.	Pos.	Nation	Player
1	GK	MKD	Andrej Jovchevski
2	DF	MKD	Alban Rochi
5	DF	KOS	Landrit Rama
7	FW	MKD	Arbi Vosha
8	MF	MKD	Adrian Zendelovski
9	FW	FRA	Hammond Agamah
10	MF	MKD	Besmir Bojku
11	MF	MKD	Bunjamin Shabani (captain)
13	FW	MKD	Florian Rochi
14	FW	MKD	Marjan Radeski
15	FW	MKD	Agon Demiri
17	DF	SEN	Pape Fall

No.	Pos.	Nation	Player
19	MF	MKD	Ard Kasami
20	FW	ALB	Altin Aliji
22	MF	NGR	Daniel Akinlosotu
27	MF	MKD	Memetriza Hamza
28	DF	KOS	Qendrim Ismajli
29	FW	MKD	Hristijan Maleski
44	GK	MKD	Vasko Vasilev
59	DF	KOS	Andi Demiri
77	DF	MKD	Bleron Ramadani
80	DF	ALB	Edison Kola
88	DF	MKD	Egzon Belica
94	DF	FRA	Lassana Diako

=== Out on loan ===
Note: Flags indicate national team as defined under FIFA eligibility rules; some limited exceptions apply. Players may hold more than one non-FIFA nationality.

No.	Pos.	Nation	Player
—	FW	MKD	Vebi Islami (at Kamjani until 30 June 2027)

== Personnel ==
As of 28 February 2025

Current technical staff
Position	Name
Head coach	(Albania) Bledi Shkëmbi
Assistant coaches
Assistant coaches	(Albania) Sabien Lilaj
Assistant coaches	(North Macedonia) Meriton Gega
Assistant coaches	(North Macedonia) Dejan Leskaroski
Fitness coach	(North Macedonia) Stefan Mechkaroski
Goalkeeper coach	(North Macedonia) Dardan Miftari
Doctor
Doctor	(North Macedonia) Oliver Bajcheski
Doctor	(North Macedonia) Halid Alied
Doctor	(North Macedonia) Sejad Solakoski
Doctor	(North Macedonia) Drilon Ala
Physiotherapists
Physiotherapists	(North Macedonia) Erblin Domazeti
Physiotherapists	(North Macedonia) Afrim Bojku
Material base	(North Macedonia) Sabaudin Hani
Club Structure
Office	Name
President	(North Macedonia) Arbtrim Qyra
Vol. President	(North Macedonia) Lum Qyra
Secretary	(North Macedonia) Miftar Shaqiri
Sports director	(North Macedonia) Besar Isaku
PR / Video	(North Macedonia) Resul Collaku
Finance & accounting	(North Macedonia) Ardit Hajredini
PR / Photography	(North Macedonia) Ermir Korca
Media and press Officer	(North Macedonia) Roland Amzai
