= SRC Biljanini Izvori =

Multi-purpose stadium in Ohrid, North Macedonia

Coordinates: 41°06′18″N 20°48′44″E

SRC Biljanini Izvori; СРЦ Билјанини Извори
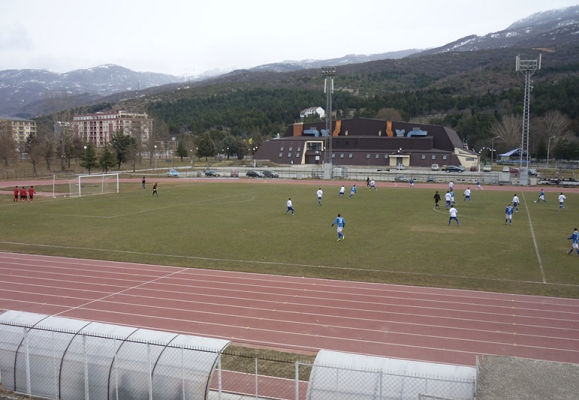
- Interactive map of: SRC Biljanini Izvori; СРЦ Билјанини Извори
- Full name: Sports and Recreation Center Biljanini Izvori
- Owner: Ohrid Municipality
- Operator: P.E. Biljanini İzvori
- Capacity: 3,978; 1,478 (international)
- Surface: Grass
- Field size: 100 x 68 meters

Construction
- Opened: 1978
- Expanded: 2021

Tenants
- FK Ohrid Lihnidos (1978-present); ŽFK Biljanini Izvori (2010-present)

SRC Biljanini Izvori (Macedonian: СРЦ "Билјанини извори") is a multi-purpose stadium in Ohrid, North Macedonia. It has a seating capacity of 3,978 and is the home ground of FK Ohrid Lihnidos, FK Voska Sport and ŽFK Biljanini Izvori. It has also been used by North Macedonia's national team for training.

== History ==
The stadiums was constructed in 1978 and had a capacity of 2,500. In 2021, a new Eastern stand seating 1,478 people was opened.

The stadium lacks floodlights, as such all the games have to be played under natural sunlight.

== Concerts and events ==
- Bijelo Dugme performed a concert on 31 July 2010.
- Aca Lukas performed a concert in front of 7,000 people on 2 August 2013.
- Željko Joksimović performed a concert in front of 10,000 people on 3 August 2013.
- Svetlana Ražnatović CECA performed a concert as part of her Poziv Tour on 1 August 2014.
- Aleksandra Prijović performed in front of 20,000 people on 1 August 2024.

== Notable matches ==
- 2023 UEFA European Under-21 Championship qualification – 7 September 2021 between Macedonia and Serbia.
- 2023–24 UEFA Champions League First qualifying round, Second leg – 18 July 2023 between FC Struga and Žalgiris.
- 2023–24 UEFA Europa Conference League Second qualifying round, First leg – 26 July 2023 between FC Struga and Budućnost Podgorica.
- 2023–24 UEFA Europa Conference League Play-off round, First leg – 24 August 2023 between FC Struga and Breidanlik.
- 2024–25 UEFA Champions League First qualifying round, Second leg – 17 July 2024 between FC Struga and Slovan Bratislava.
- 2024–25 UEFA Europa Conference League Second qualifying round, First leg – 24 July 2024 between FC Struga and Pyunik.
