= KF Bashkimi 1947 =

Macedonian association football club

Bashkimi 1947
- Full name: Klubi Futbollistik Bashkimi Kumanovë 1947
- Founded: 2009; 17 years ago
- Ground: KF Bashkimi Stadium
- Capacity: 3,500
- Chairman: Burak Hida
- Manager: Shaban Sulejmani
- League: Macedonian First League
- 2025–26: First League, 7th
Home colours	Away colours

KF Bashkimi 1947 (Macedonian: ФК Башкими 1947) is a football club based in Kumanovo, North Macedonia. They currently compete in the Macedonian First League.

== History ==
Bashkimi was established in 2009, after the dissolution of the club with same name, a club which folded before the 2008–09 Macedonian First League season, due to a high financial debt. Legally, the two clubs' track records and honours are kept separate by the Football Federation of North Macedonia, however KF Bashkimi is widely regarded as the successor.

The club's name means "unity" in Albanian.

== Supporters ==
KF Bashkimi supporters are called Ilirët meaning Illyrians. Their brother group is Torcida from Mitrovica.

== Players ==
=== Current squad ===
As of 19 November 2026

Note: Flags indicate national team as defined under FIFA eligibility rules; some limited exceptions apply. Players may hold more than one non-FIFA nationality.

No.	Pos.	Nation	Player
2	DF	NGR	Yahaya Fawzi
3	DF	MKD	Bilal Iseni
4	MF	CMR	Gabriel Yapy Tenlep
5	DF	MKD	Rraman Asani
6	DF	MKD	Fati Ismaili
7	MF	MKD	Stefan Ristovski
8	MF	MKD	Mal Januzi
9	FW	GBS	Rachide
10	MF	MKD	Adis Murati (captain)
11	DF	GER	Mayimona Antonio
14	MF	MKD	Bejzad Limani
16	MF	MKD	Erion Salihi

No.	Pos.	Nation	Player
17	MF	SUI	Claudio Martínez
18	DF	MKD	Lirjon Destani
19	DF	MKD	Andrej Ljubevski
20	MF	ALB	Andri Stafa
21	FW	MKD	Teodor Mirchevski
23	DF	ALB	Xhuljan Kapllanaj
25	FW	MKD	Ensar Saiti
30	GK	MKD	Besjan Aliju
33	DF	MKD	Sumer Hasan
77	FW	MKD	Hebib Saiti
80	FW	TTO	Nickel Orr
88	DF	MKD	Besir Kurtishi
96	GK	MKD	Luka Stojkovski

=== Youth players ===
Players from the U19 Youth Team that have been summoned with the first team in the current season.
Note: Flags indicate national team as defined under FIFA eligibility rules; some limited exceptions apply. Players may hold more than one non-FIFA nationality.

No.	Pos.	Nation	Player
16	FW	MKD	Erion Salihi
18	DF	MKD	Lijirjon Destani

No.	Pos.	Nation	Player
77	FW	MKD	Besir Kurtishi

=== Current technical staff ===
As of 11 August 2026

Position	Name
Head coach	(North Macedonia) Shaban Sulejmani
Assistant coach	(North Macedonia) Aleksandar Stojanov
Goalkeeper coach	(North Macedonia) Filip Madžovski
Fitness coach	(North Macedonia) Flurim Imeri
Fitness coach	(North Macedonia) Toni Bogdanovski
Physiotherapist	(North Macedonia) Drin Osmani
Doctor	(North Macedonia) Faik Demiri
Security person	(North Macedonia) Furkan Fetahu
Security person	(North Macedonia) Erkan Aliu
Administrator	(North Macedonia) Faton Beljulji
Club representative	(North Macedonia) Ergin Sherifi
Club representative	(North Macedonia) Bekim Ramadani
