= 2017–18 Macedonian Football Cup =

Tournament details
- Country: Macedonia
- Dates: 16 August 2017 – 23 May 2018
- Teams: 31

Final positions
- Champions: Shkëndija (2nd title)
- Runners-up: Pelister

Tournament statistics
- Matches played: 23
- Goals scored: 89 (3.87 per match)
- Top goal scorer(s): Besart Ibraimi (8 goals)

The 2017–18 Macedonian Football Cup was the 26th season of Macedonia's football knockout competition. Pelister are the defending champions, having won their second title in the previous year.

== Competition calendar ==
Round	Date(s)	Fixtures	Clubs	New entries
First Round	16, 30, 31 August 2017	15	31 → 15	31
Second Round	13 September & 18 October 2017	16	15 → 8	1
Quarter-finals	8, 29 November 2017	8	8 → 4	none
Semi-finals	14 March & 11 April 2018	4	4 → 2	none
Final	23 May 2018	1	2 → 1	none

== First round ==
The matches were played on 16 and 30 August 2017.

Team 1	Score	Team 2
16 August 2017
SSK Nova (3)	0–6	Akademija Pandev (1)
Borec (2)	4–0	Vëllazërimi 77 (2)
Kozhuf (2)	1–1 (6–5 p)	Novaci (2)
Vardar Negotino (3)	3–5	Gorno Lisiche (2)
Belasica (2)	1–3	Pelister (1)
Plachkovica (2)	0–4	Pobeda (1)
Osogovo (2)	1–2	Bregalnica Shtip (2)
Mogila (3)	0–6	Sileks (1)
Struga (2)	1–0	Makedonija G.P. (2)
Ohrid (3)	0–3 (w/o)	Skopje (1)
Zajazi (2)	2–4	Shkupi (1)
Teteks (2)	2–1	Horizont Turnovo (2)
Tikvesh (2)	0–1	Renova (1)
30 August 2017
Gostivar (2)	0–2	Shkëndija (1)
31 August 2017
Lokomotiva (2)	1–4	Vardar (1)
N/A
Rabotnichki (1)	bye	

== Second round ==
The first legs were played on 13 September and the second legs were played on 18 October 2017 except of the Vardar–Shkupi matches which were played on 30 November and 17 December 2017 due to the Vardar's participation in the UEFA Europa League.

Team 1	Agg.	Team 2	1st leg	2nd leg
Bregalnica Shtip (2)	3–8	Pobeda (1)	2–3	1–5
Skopje (1)	6–0	Gorno Lisiche (2)	3–0	3–0
Kozhuf (2)	4–5	Teteks (2)	2–2	2–3
Pelister (1)	7–3	Borec (2)	4–2	3–1
Rabotnichki (1)	2–2 (2–3 p)	Shkëndija (1)	1–1	1–1
Renova (1)	5–4	Struga (2)	3–2	2–2
Sileks (1)	1–5	Akademija Pandev (1)	1–0	0–5
Vardar (1)	3–1	Shkupi (1)	1–1	2–0

== Quarter-finals ==
The first legs were played on 8 November and the second legs were played on 29 November 2017 except of the Vardar–Shkëndija matches which were played on 21 February and 7 March 2018 due to the Vardar's participation in the UEFA Europa League.

=== Summary ===
Team 1	Agg.	Team 2	1st leg	2nd leg
Teteks (2)	1–6	Akademija Pandev (1)	0–2	1–4
Renova (1)	4–1	Skopje (1)	2–0	2–1
Pelister (1)	7–4	Pobeda (1)	5–2	2–2
Vardar (1)	1–5	Shkëndija (1)	1–1	0–4

=== Matches ===
8 November 2017
13:00 CET

Teteks (2)	0–2	Akademija Pandev (1)
		Mishov 35'; Baldovaliev 83'

AMS Stadium, Tetovo
Referee: Dimitar Mechkarovski (Skopje)
29 November 2017
13:00 CET

Akademija Pandev (1)	4–1	Teteks (2)
Ganchev 21'; Stoilov 33'; Mihailov 81'		Saliji 73'

Stadion Kukush, Turnovo
Referee: Marjan Stojanchevski (Skopje)

Akademija Pandev won 6–1 on aggregate.

8 November 2017
13:00 CET

Renova (1)	2–0	Skopje (1)
Petkovski 80'; Kostov 87'

Gradski stadion, Tetovo
Referee: Jovan Kachevski (Struga)
29 November 2017
13:00 CET

Skopje (1)	1–2	Renova (1)
Gjurchinovski 61'		Ramadani 75'; Jusufi 90+1'

Stadion Zhelezarnica, Skopje
Referee: Aleksandar Stavrev (Skopje)

Renova won 4–1 on aggregate.

8 November 2017
13:00 CET

Pelister (1)	5–2	Pobeda (1)
Todorovski 34', 40'; Peev 63'; Lucas Cardoso 82', 87'		Ristevski 28'; Naumoski 44' (pen.)

Stadion Tumbe Kafe, Bitola
Referee: Marjan Markoski (Ohrid)
29 November 2017
13:00 CET

Pobeda (1)	2–2	Pelister (1)
Ilijovski 10'; Nedanoski 53'		Jadelson 30', 62'

Stadion Tumbe Kafe, Bitola
Referee: Marjan Gocevski (Strumica)

Pelister won 7–4 on aggregate.

21 February 2018
14:00 CET

Vardar (1)	1–1	Shkëndija (1)
Juan Felipe 78'		Ibraimi 63'

Philip II Arena, Skopje
Referee: Dimitar Mechkarovski (Skopje)
7 March 2018
14:00 CET

Shkëndija (1)	4–0	Vardar (1)
Ibraimi 53', 57', 65'; Musliu 26'

Gradski stadion, Tetovo
Referee: Aleksandar Stavrev (Skopje)

Shkëndija won 5–1 on aggregate.

== Semi-finals ==
The first legs were played on 14 March 2018 and the second legs were played on 11 April 2018.

=== Summary ===
Team 1	Agg.	Team 2	1st leg	2nd leg
Shkëndija (1)	3–1	Renova (1)	1–1	2–0
Pelister (1)	3–3 (3–2 p)	Akademija Pandev (1)	2–1	1–2

=== Matches ===
14 March 2018
14:00 CET

Shkëndija (1)	1–1	Renova (1)
Emini 26'		Stojanovski 12'

Gradski stadion, Tetovo
Attendance: 3,000
Referee: Josip Barton (Tetovo)
11 April 2018
15:00 CEST

Renova (1)	0–2	Shkëndija (1)
		Ibraimi 48', 62' (pen.)

Gradski stadion, Tetovo
Attendance: 2,000
Referee: Aleksandar Stavrev (Skopje)

Shkëndija won 3–1 on aggregate.

14 March 2018
14:00 CET

Pelister (1)	2–1	Akademija Pandev (1)
Manevski 61'; Ilijovski 89'		Atanasov 31'

Stadion Tumbe Kafe, Bitola
Attendance: 1,000
Referee: Dimitar Mechkarovski (Skopje)
11 April 2018
16:00 CEST

Akademija Pandev (1)	2–1	Pelister (1)
Atanasov 73'; Krstovski 89'		Markovski 62'
Penalties
Baldovaliev (penalty missed); Atanasov (penalty scored); Cheshmedjiev (penalty scored); Dimov (penalty missed); Krstovski (penalty missed); Doriev (penalty missed); Atanasovski (penalty missed)	2–3	(penalty missed) Manevski; (penalty scored) Trifunovski; (penalty missed) Markovski; (penalty missed) Todorovski; (penalty scored) Konjarski; (penalty missed) Dragarski; (penalty scored) Markoski

Stadion Kukush, Turnovo
Attendance: 500
Referee: Dimitar Mechkarovski (Skopje)

3–3 on aggregate. Pelister won 3–2 in penalty shootout.

== Final ==
23 May 2018
20:00 CEST

Pelister (1)	0–3	Shkëndija (1)
	Report	Musliu 20', 72'; Ibraimi 52'

Stadion Mladost, Strumica
Attendance: 2,500
Referee: Marjan Markoski (Ohrid)

== Season statistics ==
=== Top scorers ===
As of 23 May 2018

Rank	Player	Club	Goals
1	(North Macedonia) Besart Ibraimi	Shkendija	8
2	(North Macedonia) Zoran Baldovaliev	Akademija Pandev	5
2	(North Macedonia) Aleksandar Mishov	Akademija Pandev	5
4	(Brazil) Lucas Cardoso	Pelister	4
5	(North Macedonia) Riste Ilijovski	Pelister	3
5	(North Macedonia) Borche Manevski	Pelister	3
5	(Nigeria) Goran Zdravkov	Bregalnica	3
5	(North Macedonia) Burhan Mustafov	Pobeda Prilep	3
5	(North Macedonia) Aleksandar Panovski	Borec	3
5	(North Macedonia) Visar Musliu	Shkëndija	3
5	(North Macedonia) Altin Lloga	Struga	3

== See also ==
- 2017–18 Macedonian First Football League
- 2017–18 Macedonian Second Football League
- 2017–18 Macedonian Third Football League
