= 2022–23 Macedonian First Football League =

Macedonian First League
- Season: 2022–23
- Dates: 6 August 2022 – 14 May 2023
- Champions: Struga; 1st domestic title
- Relegated: Skopje; Pobeda
- Champions League: Struga
- Europa Conference League: Shkëndija; Shkupi; Makedonija G.P.
- Matches: 165
- Goals: 415 (2.52 per match)
- Top goalscorer: Besart Ibraimi (19 goals)
- Biggest home win: Makedonija G.P. 7–0 Pobeda (7 May 2023)
- Biggest away win: Pobeda 0–6 Shkupi (27 November 2022)
- Highest scoring: Rabotnichki 5–4 Bregalnica (7 May 2023)
- Longest winning run: 8 games Struga
- Longest unbeaten run: 12 games Shkupi
- Longest winless run: 8 games Akademija Pandev; Skopje
- Longest losing run: 4 games Akademija Pandev; Pobeda; Skopje
- All statistics correct as of 16 December 2022.

The 2022–23 Macedonian First League was the 31st season of the Macedonian First Football League, the highest football league of North Macedonia. It began on 6 August 2022 and ended on 14 May 2023. Shkupi were the defending champions, having won their first title in 2021–22.

== Promotion and relegation ==
At the end of the 2021–22 season

Promoted from 2021–22 Second League

- Pobeda (First placed; East)
- Sileks (First placed; West)

Relegated to 2022–23 Second League

- Borec (11th)
- Pelister (12th)
- Renova (5th)^{1}

At the end of the 2022–23 season

Promoted from 2022–23 Second League

- Voska Sport (winners)
- Gostivar (runners-up)
- Vardar (Third placed; won play-off)

Relegated to 2023–24 Second League

- Skopje (10th; lost play-off)
- Pobeda (11th)

^{1}Renova withdrew from the First League due to financial reasons.

== Participating teams ==
Location of teams in 2022–23 Macedonian First League

Akademija Pandev	Bregalnica	Makedonija G.P.	Pobeda	Rabotnički	Shkëndija
Blagoj Istatov Stadium; UEFA	City Stadium Štip	Ǵorče Petrov Stadium	Goce Delčev Stadium	Toše Proeski Arena; UEFA	Tetovo Stadium
Capacity: 9,200	Capacity: 4,000	Capacity: 3,000	Capacity: 15,000	Capacity: 36,460	Capacity: 15,000
Shkupi	Sileks	Skopje	Struga	Tikvesh	
Cair Stadium	City Stadium Kratovo	Železarnica Stadium	Gradska Plaža Stadium	City Stadium Kavadarci	
Capacity: 6,000	Capacity: 6,000	Capacity: 3,000	Capacity: 2,500	Capacity: 7,500	

=== Personnel and kits ===
Note: Flags indicate national team as has been defined under FIFA eligibility rules. Players may hold more than one non-FIFA nationality.

Team	Manager	Captain	Kit manufacturer	Shirt sponsor
Akademija Pandev	(North Macedonia) Toni Atanasov (interim)	(North Macedonia) Bojan Dimoski	Sportika SA	Mozzart
Bregalnica	(North Macedonia) Goran Zdravkov	(North Macedonia) Daniel Mojsov	Hummel	Superior
Makedonija G.P.	(North Macedonia) Goran Simov	(North Macedonia) Filip Mishevski	Givova	betinasia, Tesla
Pobeda	(North Macedonia) Blagojche Damevski	(North Macedonia) Darko Tofiloski	Givona	Gigant, Cevitana, Mermeren Kombinat
Rabotnički	(North Macedonia) Milan Ilievski	(North Macedonia) Krste Velkoski	Joma	
Shkëndija	(North Macedonia) Qatip Osmani	(North Macedonia) Ferhan Hasani	Macron	Ecolog
Shkupi	(Turkey) Cihat Arslan	(North Macedonia) Kristijan Naumovski	Reaction	Alagoz Holding
Sileks	(North Macedonia) Gorazd Mihajlov	(North Macedonia) Daniel Bozhinovski	Jako	Sileks
Skopje	(North Macedonia) Mirsad Jonuz	(North Macedonia) Filip Duranski	Adidas	
Struga	(Albania) Shpëtim Duro	(North Macedonia) Bunjamin Shabani	Macron	Trim & Lum
Tikvesh	(North Macedonia) Gjorgji Mojsov	(North Macedonia) Aleksandar Varelovski	Joma	Klimi.mk, Sinalco

=== Managerial changes ===
Team	Outgoing manager	Manner of departure	Date of vacancy	Position in the table	Incoming manager	Date of appointment
Rabotnički	(North Macedonia) Stojan Ignatov	End of caretaker role	8 June 2022	Pre-season	(North Macedonia) Ljupcho Markovski	8 June 2022
Skopje	(North Macedonia) Ljupcho Markovski	Transfer	8 June 2022	Pre-season	(North Macedonia) Slavcho Georgievski	1 July 2022
Shkupi	(North Macedonia) Goce Sedloski	Resigned	31 August 2022	5th	(North Macedonia) Goce Sedloski	9 September 2022
Akademija Pandev	(North Macedonia) Gjorche Stojchev	Sacked	4 September 2022	5th	(North Macedonia) Aleksandar Vasoski	7 September 2022
Shkëndija	(North Macedonia) Artim Shaqiri	Sacked	5 September 2022	3rd	(North Macedonia) Qatip Osmani	16 September 2022
Tikvesh	(North Macedonia) Vlatko Kostov	Resigned	6 September 2022	8th	(North Macedonia) Gjorgji Mojsov	8 September 2022
Rabotnički	(North Macedonia) Ljupcho Markovski	Resigned	12 September 2022	10th	(North Macedonia) Milan Ilievski	24 September 2022
Bregalnica	(North Macedonia) Ilčo Gjorgioski	Sacked	7 December 2022	6th	(North Macedonia) Goran Zdravkov	21 December 2022
Pobeda	(North Macedonia) Boban Babunski	Resigned	4 January 2023	9th	(North Macedonia) Blagojche Damevski	5 January 2023
Struga	(North Macedonia) Srgjan Zaharievski	Sacked	27 February 2023	1st	(Albania) Shpëtim Duro	1 March 2023
Skopje	(North Macedonia) Slavcho Georgievski	Sacked	5 March 2023	10th	(North Macedonia) Mirsad Jonuz	6 March 2023
Makedonija G.P.	(North Macedonia) Muharem Bajrami	Sacked	10 March 2023	7th	(North Macedonia) Goran Simov	14 March 2023
Shkupi	(North Macedonia) Goce Sedloski	Sacked	21 March 2023	2nd	(Turkey) Cihat Arslan	22 March 2023
Akademija Pandev	(North Macedonia) Aleksandar Vasoski	Sacked	7 May 2023	9th	(North Macedonia) Toni Atanasov (interim)	7 May 2023

1.Gökhan Bozkaya was originally appointed as Goce Sedloski's replacement, however he was replaced by his predecessor after losses to Bregalnica and Tikvesh.

== League table ==
Pos	Team	Pld	W	D	L	GF	GA	GD	Pts	Qualification or relegation
1	Struga (C)	30	20	8	2	53	19	+34	68	Qualification for the Champions League first qualifying round
2	Shkupi	30	17	7	6	62	27	+35	58	Qualification for the Europa Conference League first qualifying round
3	Shkëndija	30	16	9	5	43	23	+20	57	Qualification for the Europa Conference League first qualifying round
4	Sileks	30	13	9	8	41	34	+7	48	
5	Bregalnica	30	10	11	9	33	34	−1	41	
6	Tikvesh	30	11	7	12	40	37	+3	40	
7	Makedonija G.P.	30	10	9	11	37	33	+4	39	Qualification for the Europa Conference League first qualifying round (Note: Makedonija G.P. qualified for the Europa Conference League first qualifying round by winning the 2022–23 Macedonian Football Cup.)
8	Rabotnički	30	11	4	15	37	48	−11	37	
9	Akademija Pandev	30	6	10	14	34	38	−4	28	
10	Skopje (R)	30	4	10	16	17	44	−27	22	Qualification for the Relegation play-off
11	Pobeda (R)	30	3	4	23	18	78	−60	13	Relegation to the Macedonian Second League
—	Renova (Note: Renova withdrew their participation prior to the start of the season due to financial problems.) (D, R)	0	0	0	0	0	0	0	0	Withdrawn

Source: FFM.mk, MacedonianFootball.com
Rules for classification: 1) Points; 2) Goal difference; 3) Goals scored; 4) Head-to-head points; 5) Head-to-head goal difference; 6) Head-to-head away goals scored (only if two teams); 7) Head-to-head goals scored; 8) Draw; 9) Play-off. (Note: Criteria 2, 3 and 8 is only used if not deciding Champion, teams for UEFA competitions or relegation).
(C) Champions; (D) Disqualified; (R) Relegated

== Results ==
Every team will play three times against each other team for a total of 30 matches. The first 22 match days will consist of a regular double round-robin schedule. The league standings at this point will then be used to determine the games for the last 11 match days.

Home \ Away	AKA	BRE	MGP	POB	RAB	SKE	SKU	SIL	SKO	STR	TIK	AKA	BRE	MGP	POB	RAB	SKE	SKU	SIL	SKO	STR	TIK
Akademija Pandev	—	1–2	0–1	3–0	0–2	0–1	0–1	3–0	3–0	0–3	0–2	—	—	—	2–0	0–0	—	1–1	2–2	—	—	1–4
Bregalnica	1–0	—	1–0	2–2	1–3	0–0	2–0	2–3	0–0	0–1	2–1	1–1	—	2–1	4–0	—	0–1	—	—	—	0–3	0–0
Makedonija G.P.	0–1	0–0	—	4–1	1–1	1–3	1–1	0–1	2–0	1–1	3–0	0–0	—	—	7–0	2–1	—	—	—	2–1	—	—
Pobeda	1–1	1–0	1–3	—	0–2	1–3	0–6	1–4	0–0	2–0	0–1	—	—	—	—	0–1	—	0–6	1–5	0–4	—	1–4
Rabotnički	0–5	0–1	2–0	1–0	—	2–4	2–4	0–1	4–0	1–1	2–0	—	5–4	—	—	—	1–2	—	—	1–0	0–1	—
Shkëndija	1–1	0–0	1–1	1–0	3–1	—	0–0	1–1	2–0	0–2	0–0	2–1	—	3–1	2–0	—	—	—	0–0	—	1–2	4–1
Shkupi	3–3	3–1	2–1	1–1	5–0	2–0	—	0–0	3–1	1–0	4–2	—	3–0	3–0	—	3–1	2–1	—	—	0–1	—	—
Sileks	1–1	1–2	1–3	0–3	2–0	1–1	2–1	—	3–1	1–2	3–2	—	0–0	1–0	—	2–0	—	0–2	—	3–1	—	—
Skopje	2–1	0–0	1–1	1–0	0–0	0–1	0–2	0–0	—	1–1	0–0	1–1	1–2	—	—	—	0–2	—	—	—	1–1	—
Struga	1–0	2–2	0–0	3–0	2–1	1–0	2–1	2–1	3–0	—	2–0	3–1	—	0–0	6–2	—	—	2–1	3–0	—	—	2–0
Tikvesh	2–1	1–1	4–0	1–0	3–0	1–3	3–1	0–2	2–0	1–1	—	—	—	0–1	—	1–3	—	0–0	0–0	4–0	—	—

Source: FFM.mk, MacedonianFootball.com
Legend: Blue = home team win; Yellow = draw; Red = away team win.

=== Positions by round ===
The table lists the positions of teams after each week of matches. In order to preserve chronological evolvements, any postponed matches are not included to the round at which they were originally scheduled, but added to the full round they were played immediately afterwards.

Team ╲ Round	1	2	3	4	5	6	7	8	9	10	11	12	13	14	15	16	17	18	19	20	21	22	23	24	25	26	27	28	29	30	31	32	33
Struga	1	1	1	1	1	1	1	1	1	1	1	1	1	1	1	1	1	1	1	1	1	1	1	1	1	1	1	1	1	1	1	1	1
Shkupi	6	5	8	5	5	6	4	4	5	4	3	3	3	3	2	2	2	2	2	2	2	2	2	2	2	3	3	3	3	3	2	2	2
Shkëndija	5	2	3	4	2	3	3	3	3	2	2	2	2	2	3	3	3	3	3	3	3	3	3	3	3	2	2	2	2	2	3	3	3
Sileks	2	3	2	2	3	2	2	2	2	5	4	4	4	4	4	5	4	5	5	4	4	4	4	4	4	4	4	4	4	4	4	4	4
Bregalnica	3	7	5	3	6	4	5	5	6	6	7	6	6	6	6	6	6	6	6	6	6	6	5	5	5	5	5	5	5	5	6	6	5
Tikvesh	8	6	4	7	8	7	6	6	4	3	5	5	5	5	5	4	5	4	4	5	5	5	6	6	7	7	7	7	7	8	8	7	6
Makedonija G.P.	4	8	7	8	7	8	8	7	8	8	6	7	8	7	7	8	8	7	8	7	7	7	7	7	6	6	6	6	6	6	5	5	7
Rabotnički	10	11	11	9	9	9	10	9	7	7	8	9	7	8	8	7	7	8	7	8	8	8	8	8	8	8	8	8	8	7	7	8	8
Akademija Pandev	9	4	6	6	4	5	7	8	9	9	9	10	10	10	9	9	9	10	9	9	9	9	9	9	9	9	9	9	9	9	9	9	9
Skopje	7	9	9	11	11	10	11	11	11	11	11	11	11	11	11	11	11	11	11	11	11	11	10	10	10	10	10	10	10	10	10	10	10
Pobeda	11	10	10	10	10	11	9	10	10	10	10	8	9	9	10	10	10	9	10	10	10	10	11	11	11	11	11	11	11	11	11	11	11

Leader and qualification for the Champions League first qualifying round
Qualification for the Europa Conference League first qualifying round
Qualification for the Relegation play-off
Relegation to the Macedonian Second League

Source: FFM.mk, MacedonianFootball.com

== Relegation play-offs ==
21 May 2023
17:00 CEST

Skopje	0–3	Vardar
	Report	Ramzoski 4', 50'; Glishikj 59'

Gradski stadion, Kavadarci
Referee: Aleksandar Stavrev (Skopje)

== Season statistics ==
=== Top scorers ===
As of 15 May 2023.

Rank	Player	Club	Goals
1	(North Macedonia) Besart Ibraimi	Struga	19
2	(North Macedonia) Bunjamin Shabani	Struga	12
3	(Jamaica) Renaldo Cephas	Shkupi	11
4	(Costa Rica) Freddy Álvarez	Shkupi	10
4	(North Macedonia) Ljupcho Doriev	Shkendija	10
4	(Nigeria) Sunday Adetunji	Shkupi	10
7	(Serbia) Anes Rušević	Rabotnichki	9
7	(North Macedonia) Ivan Ivanovski	Tikvesh	9
9	(North Macedonia) Krste Velkoski	Rabotnički	8
9	(Albania) Eraldo Çinari	Shkendija	8

=== Assist Providers ===
As of 15 May 2023.

Rank	Player	Club	Assists
1	(Costa Rica) Freddy Álvarez	Shkupi	20
2	(North Macedonia) Darko Dodev	Bregalnica	10
3	(Kosovo) Adenis Shala	Shkendija	9
4	(North Macedonia) Marjan Ristovski	Sileks	8
4	(Albania) Atdhe Mazari	Pobeda Rabotnichki	8

=== Clean Sheets ===
As of 15 May 2023.

Rank	Player	Club	Clean Sheets
1	(Montenegro) Nemanja Šćekić	Bregalnica	13
2	(Bosnia and Herzegovina) Vedran Kjosevski	Struga	12
2	(North Macedonia) Kristijan Naumovski	Shkupi	12
4	(North Macedonia) Igor Aleksovski	Rabotnichki	10
5	(North Macedonia) Hristijan Stevkovski	Makedonija G.P.	9
6	(North Macedonia) Daniel Bozhinovski	Sileks	8
7	(North Macedonia) Andreja Efremov	Skopje	7
7	(North Macedonia) Martin Davkov	Tikvesh	7

=== Discipline ===
As of 15 May 2023.

Rank	Player	Club	Red Cards	Yellow Cards
1	(North Macedonia) Arsim Lamalari	Sileks	2	6
2	(North Macedonia) Ali Adem	Shkupi	2	5
2	(North Macedonia) Daniel Mojsov	Bregalnica	2	5
4	(North Macedonia) Besmir Bojku	Struga	0	14
4	(North Macedonia) Goran Siljanovski	Bregalnica	0	14
6	(North Macedonia) Darko Ilieski	Struga Shkupi	1	8
6	(North Macedonia) Metodi Maksimov	Rabotnichki Shkëndija	1	8
6	(North Macedonia) Dino Najdoski	Skopje	1	8
9	(Nigeria) Sunday Adetunji	Shkupi	1	7
9	(Albania) Klisman Cake	Shkëndija	1	7
9	(Nigeria) Amos Dadet	Pobeda	0	12
9	(Serbia) Ognen Đurković	Pobeda	1	7
9	(North Macedonia) Zija Merxhani	Struga	1	7

== See also ==
- 2022–23 Macedonian Football Cup
- 2022–23 Macedonian Second Football League
