= 2017–18 Macedonian First Football League =

Macedonian First League
- Season: 2017–18
- Dates: 12 August 2017 – 20 May 2018
- Champions: Shkëndija; 2nd domestic title
- Relegated: Skopje; Pelister
- Champions League: Shkëndija
- Europa League: Vardar; Rabotnički; Shkupi
- Matches: 180
- Goals: 461 (2.56 per match)
- Top goalscorer: Ferhan Hasani; Besart Ibraimi (22 goals)
- Biggest home win: Shkendija 5–0 Sileks (20 September 2017); Shkendija 5–0 Renova (7 April 2018)
- Biggest away win: Pelister 0–6 Shkëndija (15 April 2018)
- Highest scoring: Rabotnički 2–6 Shkëndija (17 September 2017)
- Longest winning run: 6 games Shkëndija
- Longest unbeaten run: 16 games Shkëndija
- Longest winless run: 14 games Akademija Pandev
- Longest losing run: 4 games Akademija Pandev; Renova; Sileks
- All statistics correct as of 20 May 2018.

The 2017–18 Macedonian First League was the 26th season of the Macedonian First Football League, the highest football league of Macedonia. The fixtures were announced on 25 July 2017. It began on 12 August 2017 and ended on 20 May 2018. Each team will play the other sides four times on home-away basis, for a total of 36 matches. Vardar are the defending champions, having won their tenth title in 2016–17.

== Promotion and relegation ==
At the start of the 2017–18 season

Promoted from 2016–17 Second League

- Akademija Pandev (winners)
- Skopje (runners-up)

Relegated to 2017–18 Second League

- Bregalnica Shtip (9th)
- Makedonija G.P. (10th)

At the end of the 2017–18 season

Promoted from 2017–18 Second League

- Belasica (Winners; East)
- Makedonija G.P. (Winners; West)

Relegated to 2018–19 Second League

- Skopje (9th)
- Pelister (10th)

== Participating teams ==
Location of teams in 2017–18 Macedonian First League

Club	City	Stadium	Capacity
Akademija Pandev	Strumica	Stadion Mladost; Stadion Kukush	9,200; 1,500
Pelister	Bitola	Stadion Tumbe Kafe	8,000
Pobeda	Prilep	Stadion Goce Delchev	15,000
Rabotnički	Skopje	Philip II Arena	36,460
Renova	Djepchishte	City Stadium Tetovo	15,000
Shkëndija	Tetovo	City Stadium Tetovo	15,000
Shkupi	Skopje	Chair Stadium	6,000
Sileks	Kratovo	Stadion Sileks	1,800
Skopje	Skopje	Stadion Zhelezarnica	3,000
Vardar	Skopje	Philip II Arena	36,460

=== Personnel and kits ===
Note: Flags indicate national team as has been defined under FIFA eligibility rules. Players may hold more than one non-FIFA nationality.

Team	Manager	Captain	Kit manufacturer	Shirt sponsor
Akademija Pandev	(North Macedonia) Risto Panov	(North Macedonia) Sashko Pandev	Givova	
Pelister	(North Macedonia) Nexhat Husein	(North Macedonia) Goce Todorovski	Givova	ZK Pelagonija
Pobeda	(North Macedonia) Toni Meglenski	(North Macedonia) Darko Tofiloski	Jako	Krali Marko & Vitaminka
Rabotnički	(North Macedonia) Gjore Jovanovski	(North Macedonia) Dushko Trajchevski	Joma	
Renova	(North Macedonia) Agron Memedi & Kushtrim Abdulahu	(North Macedonia) Fisnik Nuhi	Jako	Renova
Shkëndija	(North Macedonia) Qatip Osmani	(North Macedonia) Ferhan Hasani	Macron	Ecolog
Shkupi	(North Macedonia) Zekirija Ramadani	(North Macedonia) Suat Zendeli	Nike	V:KO
Sileks	(North Macedonia) Zhikica Tasevski	(North Macedonia) Gligor Gligorov	Legea	
Skopje	(North Macedonia) Ljupcho Markovski	(North Macedonia) Filip Petkovski	Givova	
Vardar	(North Macedonia) Boban Babunski	(North Macedonia) Boban Grncharov	Hummel	BetCity

== League table ==
Pos	Team	Pld	W	D	L	GF	GA	GD	Pts	Qualification or relegation
1	Shkëndija (C)	36	29	4	3	101	27	+74	91	Qualification for the Champions League first qualifying round
2	Vardar	36	16	8	12	53	41	+12	56	Qualification for the Europa League first qualifying round
3	Rabotnički	36	14	10	12	50	43	+7	52	Qualification for the Europa League first qualifying round
4	Shkupi	36	13	12	11	51	46	+5	51	Qualification for the Europa League first qualifying round
5	Sileks	36	13	11	12	30	37	−7	50	
6	Akademija Pandev	36	10	12	14	43	47	−4	42	
7	Renova	36	10	11	15	36	53	−17	41	
8	Pobeda (O)	36	10	8	18	36	56	−20	38	Qualification for the relegation play-off final
9	Skopje (R)	36	7	14	15	24	43	−19	35	Relegation to the Macedonian Second League
10	Pelister (R)	36	8	10	18	37	68	−31	34	Relegation to the Macedonian Second League

Source: MacedonianFootball.com, Soccerway
Rules for classification: 1) Points; 2) Goal difference; 3) Goals scored; 4) Head-to-head points; 5) Head-to-head goal difference; 6) Head-to-head away goals scored (only if two teams); 7) Head-to-head goals scored; 8) Draw; 9) Play-off. (Note: Criteria 2, 3 and 8 is only used if not deciding Champion, teams for UEFA competitions or relegation).
(C) Champions; (O) Play-off winners; (R) Relegated

== Results ==
Each team played home-and-away against every other team in the league twice, for a total of 36 matches each.

Home \ Away	AKA	PEL	POB	RAB	REN	SKË	SKU	SIL	SKO	VAR	AKA	PEL	POB	RAB	REN	SKË	SKU	SIL	SKO	VAR
Akademija Pandev	—	2–0	0–1	1–1	1–0	3–2	2–0	0–1	2–0	0–2	—	1–1	1–0	0–1	1–1	2–2	1–2	1–2	0–0	1–1
Pelister	3–4	—	2–1	1–1	2–1	1–3	2–2	1–2	0–0	0–1	1–3	—	1–1	3–2	3–2	0–6	0–2	2–1	0–0	0–0
Pobeda	2–2	1–2	—	2–4	1–1	0–2	2–1	0–2	4–2	1–0	0–0	1–1	—	2–0	1–0	2–1	3–3	1–0	0–1	2–0
Rabotnički	1–2	2–0	4–0	—	0–0	2–6	1–0	0–0	3–0	3–1	1–1	4–0	4–2	—	0–0	0–2	1–1	2–0	3–2	2–1
Renova	3–1	1–0	0–0	3–1	—	1–6	0–0	0–3	5–1	2–5	2–1	1–0	2–1	2–1	—	0–3	3–1	0–0	2–0	1–1
Shkëndija	2–1	3–0	3–3	2–1	2–0	—	4–1	5–0	4–0	2–0	1–0	4–0	3–0	3–0	5–0	—	2–0	1–0	3–1	1–1
Shkupi	1–1	1–1	1–0	2–1	4–1	0–3	—	0–1	1–0	2–0	5–2	5–2	3–1	1–1	3–0	0–3	—	1–1	0–2	4–1
Sileks	1–0	1–4	1–0	2–1	0–0	0–2	0–1	—	1–0	0–0	0–0	1–1	1–0	0–0	1–0	1–3	1–1	—	0–1	0–2
Skopje	1–1	1–0	0–1	0–0	0–0	1–2	0–0	1–1	—	1–1	0–2	4–0	1–0	0–1	1–1	0–0	1–1	1–1	—	0–0
Vardar	3–1	1–0	4–0	1–0	2–1	4–2	1–0	3–1	3–0	—	3–2	2–3	3–0	0–1	1–0	2–3	1–1	2–3	0–1	—

Source: MacedonianFootball.com
Legend: Blue = home team win; Yellow = draw; Red = away team win.

=== Positions by round ===
The table lists the positions of teams after each week of matches. In order to preserve chronological evolvements, any postponed matches are not included to the round at which they were originally scheduled, but added to the full round they were played immediately afterwards.

Team ╲ Round	1	2	3	4	5	6	7	8	9	10	11	12	13	14	15	16	17	18	19	20	21	22	23	24	25	26	27	28	29	30	31	32	33	34	35	36
Shkëndija	1	1	1	1	1	1	1	1	1	1	1	1	1	1	1	1	1	1	1	1	1	1	1	1	1	1	1	1	1	1	1	1	1	1	1	1
Vardar	10	5	6	4	4	3	3	2	2	2	2	2	2	2	2	2	2	2	2	2	2	2	2	2	2	2	2	2	2	2	2	2	2	2	2	2
Rabotnički	6	6	4	6	7	6	7	7	6	7	5	7	6	6	5	5	5	5	6	6	4	4	5	6	5	4	4	5	4	4	4	4	4	3	3	3
Shkupi	5	7	10	7	5	4	4	4	5	6	8	5	7	9	7	6	6	6	4	5	5	5	4	5	6	5	5	4	5	5	5	5	6	5	4	4
Sileks	3	2	3	5	6	7	5	5	4	4	4	4	4	3	4	4	3	3	3	3	3	3	3	3	3	3	3	3	3	3	3	3	3	4	5	5
Akademija Pandev	4	3	5	3	3	2	2	3	3	3	3	3	3	4	3	3	4	4	5	4	6	6	6	4	4	6	6	7	6	7	7	7	5	6	6	6
Renova	7	8	8	10	8	8	8	9	9	8	9	6	5	5	6	7	8	8	8	8	8	8	7	7	7	7	7	6	7	6	6	6	7	7	7	7
Pobeda	8	10	7	8	9	9	9	8	8	9	7	9	9	8	9	9	7	7	7	9	9	9	9	8	8	8	8	8	8	8	8	8	8	8	9	8
Skopje	9	9	9	9	10	10	10	10	10	10	10	10	10	10	10	10	10	10	10	10	10	10	10	10	10	10	10	10	9	10	9	9	9	10	8	9
Pelister	2	4	2	2	2	5	6	6	7	5	6	8	8	7	8	8	9	9	9	7	7	7	8	9	9	9	9	9	10	9	10	10	10	9	10	10

Leader and qualification for the Champions League first qualifying round
Qualification for the Europa League first qualifying round
Qualification for the Relegation play-off final
Relegation to the Macedonian Second League

Source: macedonianfootball.com

== Relegation play-offs ==
=== Semi-final ===
28 May 2018
16:30 CEST

Gostivar	0–0	Borec
	Report
Penalties
Ademi (penalty missed); Bexheti (penalty scored); Esati (penalty scored); Grozdanoski (penalty scored); Osmani (penalty scored)	4–5	(penalty scored) Kocev; (penalty scored) Risteski; (penalty scored) Acevski; (penalty scored) Kudijan; (penalty scored) Gjorgjev

Training Centre Petar Miloshevski, Skopje
Referee: Marjan Markovski (Ohrid)

=== Final ===
2 June 2018
16:30 CEST

Pobeda	2–1	Borec
Ivanović 8'; Velkoski 29'	Report	Kudijan 56'

Stadion Mladost, Strumica
Referee: Dejan Jakimovski (Skopje)

== Season statistics ==
=== Top scorers ===
As of 20 May 2018

Rank	Player	Club	Goals
1	(North Macedonia) Ferhan Hasani	Shkëndija	22
1	(North Macedonia) Besart Ibraimi	Shkëndija	22
3	(North Macedonia) Zoran Baldovaliev	Akademija Pandev	14
4	(North Macedonia) Blazhe Ilijoski	Pelister & Shkupi	13
4	(North Macedonia) Alen Jasharoski	Shkupi	13
6	(Nigeria) Chinedu Charles Geoffrey	Rabotnički	11
6	(Brazil) Stênio Júnior	Shkëndija	11
6	(North Macedonia) Kire Markoski	Rabotnički	11
9	(Armenia) Tigran Barseghyan	Vardar	9
9	(North Macedonia) Marjan Radeski	Shkëndija	9

== Attendances ==
#	Club	Average
1	Shkëndija	3,572
2	Pelister	1,628
3	Shkupi	1,339
4	Akademija Pandev	742
5	Renova	611
6	Vardar	550
7	Pobeda	525
8	Sileks	467
9	FK Skopje	272
10	Rabotnički	217

== See also ==
- 2017–18 Macedonian Football Cup
- 2017–18 Macedonian Second Football League
- 2017–18 Macedonian Third Football League
