= 2018–19 Macedonian First Football League =

Macedonian First League
- Season: 2018–19
- Dates: 11 August 2018 – 26 May 2019
- Champions: Shkëndija; 3rd domestic title
- Relegated: Belasica; Pobeda
- Champions League: Shkëndija
- Europa League: Akademija Pandev; Makedonija G.P. Shkupi
- Matches: 180
- Goals: 440 (2.44 per match)
- Top goalscorer: Vlatko Stojanovski (18 goals)
- Biggest home win: Renova 9–1 Pobeda (4 May 2019)
- Biggest away win: Belasica 1–4 Makedonija G.P. (10 November 2018); Renova 0–3 Shkëndija (2 December 2018)
- Highest scoring: Renova 9–1 Pobeda (4 May 2019)
- Longest winning run: 7 games Shkëndija
- Longest unbeaten run: 13 games Vardar
- Longest winless run: 15 games Pobeda
- Longest losing run: 7 games Pobeda
- All statistics correct as of 26 May 2019.

The 2018–19 Macedonian First League was the 27th season of the Macedonian First Football League, the highest football league of North Macedonia (before 12 February Macedonia). It began on 11 August 2018 and ended on 26 May 2019. Each team played the other sides four times on home-away basis, for a total of 36 matches. Shkëndija were the defending champions, having won their second title in 2017–18.

== Promotion and relegation ==
At the end of the 2017–18 season

Promoted from 2017–18 Second League

- Belasica (Winners; East)
- Makedonija G.P. (Winners; West)

Relegated to 2018–19 Second League

- Skopje (9th)
- Pelister (10th)

At the end of the 2018–19 season

Promoted from 2018–19 Second League

- Borec (Winners; East)
- Struga (Winners; West)

Relegated to 2019–20 Second League

- Belasica (9th)
- Pobeda (10th)

== Participating teams ==
Location of teams in 2018–19 Macedonian First League

Akademija Pandev	Belasica	Makedonija G.P.	Pobeda
Kukuš Stadium	Blagoj Istatov Stadium	Gjorče Petrov Stadium	Stadion Goce Delchev
Capacity: 1,500	Capacity: 9,200	Capacity: 3,000	
Rabotnički Vardar	Renova Shkëndija	Shkupi	Sileks
Toše Proeski Arena (Note: The stadium was called Philip II Arena until 9 April 2019.); UEFA	Ecolog Arena	Chair Stadium	City Stadium Kratovo
Capacity: 36,460	Capacity: 15,000	Capacity: 6,000	Capacity: 4,800

=== Personnel and kits ===
Note: Flags indicate national team as has been defined under FIFA eligibility rules. Players may hold more than one non-FIFA nationality.

Team	Manager	Captain	Kit manufacturer	Shirt sponsor
Akademija Pandev	(North Macedonia) Jugoslav Trenchovski	(North Macedonia) Sashko Pandev	Givova	
Belasica	(North Macedonia) Zdravko Zdravkov	(North Macedonia) Dragan Stojkov	Nike	Cosmopolit
Makedonija G.P.	(North Macedonia) Aleksandar Tanevski	(North Macedonia) Bobi Bozhinovski	Kappa	Evropa
Pobeda	(North Macedonia) Toni Meglenski	(North Macedonia) Darko Tofiloski	Jako	Krali Marko & Vitaminka
Rabotnički	(North Macedonia) Zhikica Tasevski	(North Macedonia) Blazhe Ilijoski	Joma	Seavus
Renova	(North Macedonia) Nikola Ilievski	(North Macedonia) Fisnik Nuhi	Jako	Renova
Shkëndija	(North Macedonia) Qatip Osmani	(North Macedonia) Armend Alimi	Macron	Ecolog
Shkupi	(Turkey) Ümit Karan	(North Macedonia) Muharem Bajrami	Kappa	ATS Group
Sileks	(North Macedonia) Momchilo Mitevski	(North Macedonia) Filip Duranski	Legea	
Vardar	(North Macedonia) Aleksandar Vasoski	(North Macedonia) Goran Popov	Hummel	BetCity

== League table ==
Pos	Team	Pld	W	D	L	GF	GA	GD	Pts	Qualification or relegation
1	Shkëndija (C)	36	24	7	5	80	29	+51	79	Qualification for the Champions League first qualifying round
2	Vardar	36	17	13	6	45	23	+22	64	Excluded from European competitions (Note: Vardar failed to get the UEFA license for the competition due to financial problems.)
3	Akademija Pandev	36	17	7	12	45	35	+10	58	Qualification for the Europa League first qualifying round
4	Shkupi	36	13	9	14	40	42	−2	48	Qualification for the Europa League first qualifying round
5	Makedonija G.P.	36	12	11	13	45	50	−5	47	Qualification for the Europa League first qualifying round
6	Renova	36	12	11	13	53	49	+4	47	
7	Rabotnički	36	13	7	16	43	49	−6	46	
8	Sileks (O)	36	11	11	14	27	39	−12	44	Qualification for the relegation play-off final
9	Belasica (R)	36	9	11	16	37	49	−12	38	Relegation to the Macedonian Second League
10	Pobeda (R)	36	6	5	25	26	76	−50	23	Relegation to the Macedonian Second League

Source: MacedonianFootball.com
Rules for classification: 1) Points; 2) Goal difference; 3) Goals scored; 4) Head-to-head points; 5) Head-to-head goal difference; 6) Head-to-head away goals scored (only if two teams); 7) Head-to-head goals scored; 8) Draw; 9) Play-off. (Note: Criteria 2, 3 and 8 is only used if not deciding Champion, teams for UEFA competitions or relegation).
(C) Champions; (O) Play-off winners; (R) Relegated

== Results ==
Each team played home-and-away against every other team in the league twice, for a total of 36 matches each.

Home \ Away	AKP	BEL	MGP	POB	RAB	REN	SKË	SKU	SIL	VAR	AKP	BEL	MGP	POB	RAB	REN	SKË	SKU	SIL	VAR
Akademija Pandev	—	3–0	2–1	2–1	1–0	0–2	0–0	1–0	3–0	0–0	—	0–2	3–0	4–0	3–1	2–1	0–1	0–2	2–0	1–1
Belasica	0–2	—	1–4	2–1	1–2	3–1	0–2	1–0	1–1	1–1	0–1	—	3–1	1–1	0–1	3–2	2–1	2–0	0–1	0–0
Makedonija G.P.	1–0	0–0	—	1–0	3–0	1–2	0–0	2–2	1–1	1–3	1–1	2–1	—	3–0	1–1	3–1	1–1	1–0	2–0	0–2
Pobeda	2–4	1–0	0–2	—	0–2	1–0	0–2	2–0	2–0	0–1	1–3	1–1	1–3	—	0–1	2–3	1–4	0–3	0–1	0–0
Rabotnički	1–0	1–1	5–1	3–1	—	3–4	1–2	0–2	2–1	0–2	1–2	1–1	2–0	1–2	—	1–1	0–1	1–2	1–1	0–2
Renova	1–1	0–2	1–1	2–1	0–2	—	0–3	2–0	1–1	0–1	2–2	3–2	0–0	9–1	1–2	—	3–2	1–0	1–0	4–0
Shkëndija	0–1	4–1	5–1	0–2	6–2	2–2	—	3–0	5–0	2–2	4–1	3–0	4–2	5–2	1–0	2–1	—	5–1	0–0	1–0
Shkupi	1–0	1–0	2–1	0–0	1–1	1–1	1–2	—	2–0	1–0	1–0	2–2	0–1	3–0	1–2	2–2	1–0	—	2–1	2–2
Sileks	1–0	1–0	1–1	0–0	2–0	1–0	1–2	1–1	—	0–1	3–0	2–1	1–1	1–0	1–0	0–0	0–3	2–2	—	1–0
Vardar	3–0	1–1	1–0	3–0	0–1	0–0	0–2	2–1	1–0	—	1–1	1–1	3–1	6–0	1–1	2–0	0–0	1–0	1–0	—

Source: MacedonianFootball.com
Legend: Blue = home team win; Yellow = draw; Red = away team win.

=== Positions by round ===
The table lists the positions of teams after each week of matches. In order to preserve chronological evolvements, any postponed matches are not included to the round at which they were originally scheduled, but added to the full round they were played immediately afterwards.

Team ╲ Round	1	2	3	4	5	6	7	8	9	10	11	12	13	14	15	16	17	18	19	20	21	22	23	24	25	26	27	28	29	30	31	32	33	34	35	36
Shkëndija	4	6	4	3	2	2	3	3	2	2	2	2	1	1	1	1	1	1	1	1	1	1	1	1	1	1	1	1	1	1	1	1	1	1	1	1
Vardar	5	2	2	4	3	3	1	1	1	1	1	1	2	2	2	2	2	2	2	3	2	3	3	3	3	2	2	2	2	2	2	2	2	2	2	2
Akademija Pandev	2	1	1	2	1	1	2	2	3	3	3	3	3	3	3	3	3	3	3	2	3	2	2	2	2	3	3	3	3	3	3	3	3	3	3	3
Shkupi	6	7	9	8	9	6	9	10	10	9	10	9	9	8	9	6	6	5	5	5	5	4	4	5	5	5	7	6	4	4	4	4	4	4	5	4
Makedonija G.P.	9	9	9	8	8	10	8	8	7	5	6	7	8	7	6	8	7	6	7	7	7	8	7	7	7	7	6	7	7	7	7	7	6	7	7	5
Renova	1	5	7	7	7	9	7	5	4	7	8	6	6	4	5	5	5	7	6	6	6	6	6	4	4	4	4	5	6	5	5	5	5	5	6	6
Rabotnički	8	4	3	1	4	4	5	6	6	4	5	4	5	6	4	4	4	4	4	4	4	5	5	6	6	6	5	4	5	6	6	6	7	6	4	7
Sileks	7	8	5	5	6	8	10	9	9	10	9	10	10	9	10	10	10	8	8	8	8	7	8	8	8	8	8	8	8	8	8	8	8	8	8	8
Belasica	10	10	10	10	10	7	6	7	8	6	7	8	7	10	8	9	9	10	10	9	10	9	9	9	9	9	9	9	9	9	9	9	9	9	9	9
Pobeda	3	3	6	6	5	5	4	4	5	8	4	5	4	5	7	7	8	9	9	10	9	10	10	10	10	10	10	10	10	10	10	10	10	10	10	10

Leader and qualification for the Champions League first qualifying round
Qualification for the Europa League first qualifying round
Qualification for the Relegation play-off final
Relegation to the Macedonian Second League

Source: macedonianfootball.com

== Season statistics ==
=== Top scorers ===
As of 26 May 2019

Rank	Player	Club	Goals
1	(North Macedonia) Vlatko Stojanovski	Renova	18
2	(North Macedonia) Ljupcho Doriev	Akademija Pandev	16
3	(North Macedonia) Izair Emini	Shkëndija	11
3	(North Macedonia) Besart Ibraimi	Shkëndija	11
3	(North Macedonia) Hristijan Kirovski	Makedonija G.P.	11
3	(North Macedonia) Petar Petkovski	Rabotnički	11
3	(North Macedonia) Emran Ramadani	Renova	11
8	(North Macedonia) Pepi Gorgiev	Belasica	9
8	(North Macedonia) Dejan Tanturovski	Makedonija G.P.	9
10	(North Macedonia) Bobi Bozhinovski	Makedonija G.P.	8
10	(North Macedonia) Boban Georgiev	Sileks	8
10	(Albania) Omar Imeri	Shkëndija	8
10	(North Macedonia) Darko Micevski	Vardar	8

== Attendances ==
#	Club	Average
1	Shkëndija	2,711
2	Shkupi	1,528
3	Belasica	589
4	Akademija Pandev	558
5	Vardar	481
6	Renova	439
7	Sileks	425
8	Pobeda	314
9	Makedonija GP	283
10	Rabotnički	228

== See also ==
- 2018–19 Macedonian Football Cup
- 2018–19 Macedonian Second Football League
- 2018–19 Macedonian Third Football League
