= 2016–17 Macedonian Football Cup =

Tournament details
- Country: Macedonia
- Dates: 16 August 2016 – 17 May 2017
- Teams: 30

Final positions
- Champions: Pelister (2nd title)
- Runners-up: Shkëndija

Tournament statistics
- Matches played: 39
- Goals scored: 136 (3.49 per match)

The 2016–17 Macedonian Football Cup was the 25th season of Macedonia's football knockout competition. Shkëndija are the defending champions, having won their first title in the previous year.

== Competition calendar ==
Round	Date(s)	Fixtures	Clubs	New entries
First Round	16, 17, 24, 31 August 2016	14	30 → 14	30
Second Round	21 September & 12, 19 October 2016	14	14 → 8	2
Quarter-finals	23 November & 7 December 2016	8	8 → 4	none
Semi-finals	1 March & 19 April 2017	4	4 → 2	none
Final	17 May 2017	1	2 → 1	none

== First round ==
The matches were played on 16, 17, 24, and 31 August 2016.

Team 1	Score	Team 2
16 August 2016
Sateska (3)	0–3	Metalurg (2)
17 August 2016
Çakllani (4)	1–6	Rabotnichki (1)
Vlaznimi (3)	0–1	Teteks (2)
Fortuna (3)	0–3	Pobeda (1)
Belasica (3)	2–2 (1–3 p)	Pelister (1)
Akademija Pandev (2)	5–0	Makedonija G.P. (1)
Ljuboten (4)	0–6	Horizont Turnovo (2)
Vardar Negotino (2)	0–2	Shkupi (1)
Gorno Lisiche (2)	1–3	Renova (1)
Novaci (2)	2–1	Skopje (2)
Malesh (3)	0–1	Sileks (1)
Kozhuf (3)	0–3	Vëllazërimi 77 (2)
24 August 2016
Skënderbeu Poroj (3)	0–9	Vardar (1)
31 August 2016
Golemo Konjari (3)	0–11	Shkëndija (1)
N/A
Bregalnica Shtip (1)	bye	
Mladost Carev Dvor (x)	bye	

== Second round ==
Entering this round are the 14 winners from the First Round and Bregalnica Shtip who got a bye to this round. Mladost Carev Dvor withdrew from the competition, so their opponents Metalurg got a bye to the next round. The draw was held on 2 September 2016. The first legs were played on 21 September and the second legs were played on 12 and 19 October 2016.

Team 1	Agg.	Team 2	1st leg	2nd leg
Akademija Pandev (2)	1–4	Shkupi (1)	0–1	1–3
Pelister (1)	(a) 3–3	Renova (1)	2–0	1–3
Vëllazërimi 77 (2)	1–5	Vardar (1)	1–3	0–2
Sileks (1)	5–4	Horizont Turnovo (2)	2–1	3–3
Bregalnica Shtip (1)	6–1	Teteks (2)	4–0	2–1
Novaci (2)	1–7	Pobeda (1)	1–2	0–5
Rabotnichki (1)	0–2	Shkëndija (1)	0–2	0–0
Metalurg (2)	w/o	Mladost Carev Dvor (x)	–	–
Bregalnica Shtip (1)	bye			

== Quarter-finals ==
The first legs were played on 23 November 2016 and the second legs played on 7 December 2016.

=== Summary ===
Team 1	Agg.	Team 2	1st leg	2nd leg
Shkupi (1)	0–4	Shkëndija (1)	0–0	0–4
Metalurg (2)	2–8	Vardar (1)	1–4	1–4
Pelister (1)	3–1	Sileks (1)	1–0	2–1
Pobeda (1)	2–5	Bregalnica Shtip (1)	2–2	0–3

=== Matches ===
23 November 2016
13:30 CET

Shkupi (1)	0–0	Shkëndija (1)

Stadion Chair, Skopje
Referee: Stojanche Stojanov (Shtip)
7 December 2016
13:00 CET

Shkëndija (1)	4–0	Shkupi (1)
Ibraimi 12', 45+1', 61'; Júnior 22'

Gradski stadion, Tetovo
Referee: Zorancho Temelkov (Kavadarci)

Shkëndija won 4–0 on aggregate.

23 November 2016
13:30 CET

Metalurg (2)	1–4	Vardar (1)
Fidanovski 88'		Asani 9'; Nikolov 26'; Popov 29'; Petkovski 45'

Stadion Zhelezarnica, Skopje
Referee: Marjan Gocevski (Strumica)
7 December 2016
13:00 CET

Vardar (1)	4–1	Metalurg (2)
Nikolov 26'; Balotelli 51', 87', 90+1'		Fidanovski 68'

Philip II Arena, Skopje
Referee: Marjan Gocevski (Strumica)

Vardar won 8–2 on aggregate.

23 November 2016
13:30 CET

Pelister (1)	1–0	Sileks (1)
Bozhinovski 78'

Stadion Tumbe Kafe, Bitola
Referee: Marjan Markoski (Ohrid)
7 December 2016
13:00 CET

Sileks (1)	1–2	Pelister (1)
Gligorov 74'		Markoski 45'; Bozhinovski 66'

Gradski stadion, Kratovo
Referee: Josip Barton (Tetovo)

Pelister won 3–1 on aggregate.

23 November 2016
13:30 CET

Pobeda (1)	2–2	Bregalnica Shtip (1)
Ristevski 17'; Gesoski 75' (pen.)		Zdravkov 41'; Velinov 47'

SRC Biljanini Izvori, Ohrid
Referee: Dalibor Gjorgjevski (Kumanovo)
7 December 2016
13:00 CET

Bregalnica Shtip (1)	3–0	Pobeda (1)
Jovanovski 22'; Georgiev 68'; Zdravkov 90'

Gradski stadion, Shtip
Referee: Marjan Markoski (Ohrid)

Bregalnica Shtip won 5–2 on aggregate.

== Semi-finals ==
The first legs were played on 1 March 2017 and the return legs played on 19 April 2017.

=== Summary ===
Team 1	Agg.	Team 2	1st leg	2nd leg
Vardar (1)	2–3	Shkëndija (1)	1–3	1–0
Bregalnica Shtip (1)	2–3	Pelister (1)	2–2	0–1

=== Matches ===
1 March 2017
14:00 CET

Vardar (1)	1–3	Shkëndija (1)
Juan Felipe 51' (pen.)		Ibraimi 24', 45+1' (pen.); Hasani 75'

Philip II Arena, Skopje
Attendance: 500
Referee: Dimitar Mechkarovski (Skopje)
19 April 2017
16:00 CEST

Shkëndija (1)	0–1	Vardar (1)
		Velkovski 60'

Gradski stadion, Tetovo
Attendance: 3,500
Referee: Aleksandar Stavrev (Skopje)

Shkëndija won 3–2 on aggregate.

1 March 2017
17:00 CET

Bregalnica Shtip (1)	2–2	Pelister (1)
Zdravkov 8'; Kostadinov 70'		Ilijoski 38' (pen.); Bojović 67'

Gradski stadion, Shtip
Attendance: 1,500
Referee: Aleksandar Stavrev (Skopje)
19 April 2017
16:00 CEST

Pelister (1)	1–0	Bregalnica Shtip (1)
Lucas Cardoso 80'

Stadion Tumbe Kafe, Bitola
Attendance: 2,000
Referee: Dimitar Mechkarovski (Skopje)

Pelister won 3–2 on aggregate.

== Final ==
17 May 2017
17:00 CEST

Shkëndija (1)	0–0 (a.e.t.)	Pelister (1)
	Report
Penalties
Alimi (penalty scored); Ibraimi (penalty missed); Radeski (penalty scored); Abdurahimi (penalty missed); Hasani (penalty scored)	3–4	(penalty scored) Petrov; (penalty scored) Todorovski; (penalty missed) Lucas Cardoso; (penalty scored) Kovachev; (penalty scored) Ilijoski

Stadion Mladost, Strumica
Attendance: 6,000
Referee: Aleksandar Stavrev (Skopje)

== Season statistics ==
=== Top scorers ===
As of 17 May 2016.

Rank	Player	Club	Goals
1	(North Macedonia) Besart Ibraimi	Shkendija	5
2	(North Macedonia) Goran Zdravkov	Bregalnica	4
2	(North Macedonia) Petar Petkovski	Vardar	4
2	(North Macedonia) Mario Krstovski	Horizont Turnovo	4
5	(Brazil) Juan Felipe	Vardar	3
5	(Colombia) Jhon Obregón	Vardar	3
5	(Brazil) Jonathan Balotelli	Vardar	3
5	(North Macedonia) Nikola Bozhinov	Horizont Turnovo	3
5	(North Macedonia) Dejan Zdraveski	Pobeda Prilep	3
5	(North Macedonia) Lazar Ilijev	Bregalnica	3
5	(North Macedonia) Demir Imeri	Shkendija	3

== See also ==
- 2016–17 Macedonian First Football League
- 2016–17 Macedonian Second Football League
