= 2016–17 Macedonian Second Football League =

Macedonian Second League
- Season: 2016–17
- Champions: Akademija Pandev
- Promoted: Akademija Pandev; Skopje
- Relegated: Metalurg; Vardar Negotino
- Matches: 135
- Goals: 335 (2.48 per match)
- Top goalscorer: Zoran Baldovaliev (20 goals)
- Biggest home win: Akademija Pandev 7–0 Tikvesh
- Biggest away win: Novaci 0–4 Horizont Turnovo
- Highest scoring: Akademija Pandev 7–0 Tikvesh; Novaci 2–5 Akademija Pandev
- Longest winning run: 10 games Akademija Pandev
- Longest unbeaten run: 10 games Akademija Pandev
- Longest winless run: 13 games Metalurg
- Longest losing run: 5 games Metalurg

The 2016–17 Macedonian Second Football League was the 25th season of the Macedonian Second Football League, the second division in the Macedonian football league system. It began on 13 August 2016 and ended on 27 May 2017. It was the last season with the current format, as of 2017–18 season the league will be divided into two groups, East and West, for the first time since the 1999–2000 season, with 10 teams in each group instead of the single league structure.

== Participating teams ==
Location of teams in 2016–17 Macedonian Second League

Club	City	Stadium	Capacity
Akademija Pandev	Strumica	Stadion Mladost	6,500
Euromilk Gorno Lisiche	Skopje	Stadion Cementarnica	2,000
Metalurg	Skopje	Stadion Zhelezarnica	3,000
Novaci ^{1}	Novaci	Stadion Novaci	500
Skopje	Skopje	Stadion Avtokomanda	4,000
Teteks	Tetovo	AMS Sportski Centar Tetovo	2,000
Tikvesh ^{1}	Kavadarci	Gradski Stadion Kavadarci	7,500
Horizont Turnovo	Turnovo	Stadion Kukush	1,500
Velazerimi 77	Kichevo	Velazerimi Arena	3,000
Vardar Negotino	Negotino	Gradski stadion Negotino	1,500

^{1} Tikveš, the third placed team in the Third League South, and Novaci, the winner of the Third League South-West, will take the place of Ljubanci and Mladost Carev Dvor, which were declined their participation in the Second League due to financial problems.

== League table ==
Pos	Team	Pld	W	D	L	GF	GA	GD	Pts	Promotion or relegation
1	Akademija Pandev (C, P)	27	21	3	3	69	24	+45	66	Promotion to Macedonian First League
2	Skopje (P)	27	16	6	5	43	26	+17	54	Promotion to Macedonian First League
3	Novaci	27	13	6	8	39	27	+12	45	Qualification to Promotion play-off
4	Horizont Turnovo	27	9	9	9	37	29	+8	36	
5	Euromilk Gorno Lisiche	27	10	5	12	29	30	−1	35	
6	Vëllazërimi 77	27	8	8	11	33	36	−3	32	
7	Tikvesh	27	9	1	17	25	53	−28	28	
8	Teteks	27	7	7	13	16	29	−13	28	
9	Metalurg (R)	27	7	5	15	27	50	−23	26	Relegation to Macedonian Third League
10	Vardar Negotino (R)	27	5	10	12	17	31	−14	25	Relegation to Macedonian Third League

Source: MacedonianFootball.com, Soccerway
Rules for classification: 1) Points; 2) Head-to-head points; 3) Head-to-head goal difference; 4) Head-to-head away goals scored
(C) Champions; (P) Promoted; (R) Relegated

== Results ==
=== Matches 1–18 ===
Home \ Away	AKA	EGL	MET	NOV	SKO	TET	TIK	TUR	VRN	VLZ
Akademija Pandev	—	1–0	2–0	1–2	2–0	5–1	7–0	1–3	2–0	3–0
Euromilk Gorno Lisiche	1–2	—	4–0	1–0	3–2	0–0	2–1	1–0	4–1	2–1
Metalurg	2–4	0–0	—	0–2	1–3	1–0	3–1	3–1	1–0	1–3
Novaci	0–1	0–1	0–0	—	2–1	1–0	2–0	0–4	1–0	5–0
Skopje	3–2	2–1	2–1	2–1	—	1–0	2–0	1–1	1–0	2–0
Teteks	0–3	1–0	0–1	1–1	0–0	—	0–1	0–0	1–0	1–0
Tikvesh	1–3	2–1	1–5	0–2	1–2	2–0	—	0–2	1–1	2–0
Horizont Turnovo	0–1	0–1	2–0	0–0	3–3	3–1	1–2	—	4–1	0–0
Vardar Negotino	1–1	0–0	1–3	0–2	1–0	0–0	2–1	0–0	—	2–0
Vëllazërimi	1–2	1–0	4–0	1–1	2–1	2–1	4–0	1–1	0–2	—

Source: MacedonianFootball.com
Legend: Blue = home team win; Yellow = draw; Red = away team win.

=== Matches 19–27 ===
Home \ Away	AKA	EGL	MET	NOV	SKO	TET	TIK	TUR	VRN	VLZ
Akademija Pandev	—	2–0	4–1	—	—	3–2	—	—	4–0	—
Euromilk Gorno Lisiche	—	—	3–3	—	0–1	—	2–0	0–2	—	2–2
Metalurg	—	—	—	—	—	—	0–2	—	1–1	0–0
Novaci	2–5	4–0	2–0	—	—	1–0	—	—	1–1	—
Skopje	—	—	4–0	2–1	—	—	2–0	2–1	—	1–1
Teteks	—	1–0	—	—	0–1	—	2–1	—	—	2–1
Tikvesh	1–3	—	—	2–1	—	—	—	—	1–0	—
Horizont Turnovo	1–3	—	3–1	2–2	—	0–0	—	—	1–0	—
Vardar Negotino	—	—	—	—	1–1	1–1	—	—	—	0–0
Vëllazërimi	1–1	—	—	—	—	—	3–0	3–1	—	—

Source: MacedonianFootball.com
Legend: Blue = home team win; Yellow = draw; Red = away team win.

== Promotion play-off ==
=== First leg ===
4 June 2017
17:00 CEST

Shkupi	4–1	Novaci
Adem 12'; Grozdanoski 16' (o.g.); Mbella 31'; Arif 74'	Report	Naumoski 70'

Gradski stadion, Shtip
Attendance: 200
Referee: Aleksandar Stavrev (Skopje)

=== Second leg ===
7 June 2017
17:00 CEST

Novaci	1–3	Shkupi
Naumoski 63'	Report	Ismaili 28'; Adem 50'; Mamuti 78'

Gradski stadion, Shtip
Attendance: 20
Referee: Stojanche Stojanov (Štip)

Shkupi won 7–2 on aggregate.

== Top scorers ==
As of 20 May 2017

Rank	Player	Club	Goals
1	(North Macedonia) Zoran Baldovaliev	Ak. Pandev	20
2	(North Macedonia) Dario Desnic	Skopje	12
3	(North Macedonia) Ljupcho Doriev	Ak. Pandev	11
3	(North Macedonia) Andrian Chavoli	Euromilk GL	11
5	(North Macedonia) Jani Atanasov	Ak. Pandev	9
5	(North Macedonia) Sasko Pandev	Ak. Pandev	9
5	(North Macedonia) Aleksandar Nedanoski	Novaci	9
5	(North Macedonia) Blagoja Naumoski	Novaci	9
9	(North Macedonia) Naumce Bakraceski	Tikves	7
9	(North Macedonia) Mario Krstovski	Horizont Turnovo	7

== See also ==
- 2016–17 Macedonian Football Cup
- 2016–17 Macedonian First Football League
- 2016–17 Macedonian Third Football League
