= 2016–17 Macedonian First Football League =

Macedonian First League
- Season: 2016–17
- Dates: 7 August 2016 – 31 May 2017
- Champions: Vardar; 10th Macedonian title 11th domestic title
- Relegated: Bregalnica; Makedonija G.P.
- Champions League: Vardar
- Europa League: Shkëndija; Rabotnički; Pelister
- Matches: 180
- Goals: 457 (2.54 per match)
- Top goalscorer: Besart Ibraimi (20 goals)
- Biggest home win: Vardar 6–0 Makedonija G.P. (7 May 2017)
- Biggest away win: Makedonija G.P. 0–5 Vardar (18 March 2017)
- Highest scoring: Renova 4–4 Shkëndija (28 May 2017); Makedonija G.P. 5–3 Bregalnica (28 May 2017); Bregalnica 6–2 Rabotnichki (31 May 2017)
- Longest winning run: 7 games Vardar
- Longest unbeaten run: 14 games Vardar
- Longest winless run: 17 games Bregalnica
- Longest losing run: 6 games Makedonija G.P.

The 2016–17 Macedonian First League was the 25th season of the Macedonian First Football League, the highest football league of Macedonia. The fixtures were announced on 25 July 2016. It began on 7 August 2016 and ended on 31 May 2017 with a winter break which began on 4 December 2016 and ended on 19 February 2017. From that season the format was changed which will each team be played the other sides four times on home-away basis, for a total of 36 matches each instead of play-off and play-out after 27th round.

The league will be contested by 10 teams. Vardar are the defending champions, having won their ninth title in 2015–16.

== Promotion and relegation ==
At the start of the 2016–17 season

Promoted from 2015–16 Second League

- Pobeda (winners)
- Makedonija G.P. (runners-up)
- Pelister (Third placed; won play-off)

Relegated to 2016–17 Second League

- Horizont Turnovo (8th; lost play-off)
- Metalurg Skopje (9th)
- Mladost Carev Dvor (10th)^{1}

At the end of the 2016–17 season

Promoted from 2016–17 Second League

- Akademija Pandev (winners)
- Skopje (runners-up)

Relegated to 2017–18 Second League

- Bregalnica Shtip (9th)
- Makedonija G.P. (10th)

^{1} Mladost Carev Dvor was declined their participation from the Second League due to financial problems.

== Participating teams ==
Location of teams in the 2016–17 Macedonian First League

Club	City	Stadium	Capacity
Bregalnica	Shtip	Gradski stadion Shtip	4,000
Makedonija G.P.	Skopje	Stadion Gjorche Petrov	3,000
Pelister	Bitola	Stadion Tumbe Kafe	8,000
Pobeda	Prilep	Stadion Goce Delchev	15,000
Rabotnički	Skopje	Philip II Arena	33,460
Renova	Djepchishte	City Stadium Tetovo	15,000
Shkëndija	Tetovo	City Stadium Tetovo	15,000
Shkupi	Skopje	Chair Stadium	6,000
Sileks	Kratovo	Stadion Sileks	1,800
Vardar	Skopje	Philip II Arena	33,460

=== Personnel and kits ===
Note: Flags indicate national team as has been defined under FIFA eligibility rules. Players may hold more than one non-FIFA nationality.

Team	Manager	Captain	Kit manufacturer	Shirt sponsor(s)
Bregalnica	(North Macedonia) Nikola Kuzmanov	(North Macedonia) Goran Zdravkov	Sportika	Gogov Hotel
Makedonija G.P.	(North Macedonia) Bobi Stojkoski	(North Macedonia) Kristijan Stojkoski	Adidas	Livinn
Pobeda	(North Macedonia) Zoran Shterjovski	(North Macedonia) Blagoja Gesoski	Jako	Krali Marko/Vitaminka
Pelister	(Kosovo) (Turkey) Naci Şensoy	(North Macedonia) Goran Pashovski	Givova	ZK Pelagonija
Rabotnički	(North Macedonia) Viktor Trenevski	(North Macedonia) Dushko Trajchevski	Zeus	
Renova	(North Macedonia) Qatip Osmani	(North Macedonia) Fisnik Nuhi	Jako	Renova
Shkëndija	(North Macedonia) Erhan Salimi (interim)	(North Macedonia) Ferhan Hasani	Macron	Ecolog
Shkupi	(North Macedonia) Ardijan Nuhiji	(North Macedonia) Suat Zendeli	Nike	S&P
Sileks	(North Macedonia) Zhikica Tasevski	(North Macedonia) Marjan Mickov	Legea	
Vardar	(North Macedonia) Goce Sedloski	(North Macedonia) Boban Grncharov	Hummel	Zdravje

== League table ==
Pos	Team	Pld	W	D	L	GF	GA	GD	Pts	Qualification or relegation
1	Vardar (C)	36	25	8	3	75	24	+51	83	Qualification for the Champions League second qualifying round
2	Shkëndija	36	20	10	6	71	39	+32	70	Qualification for the Europa League first qualifying round (Note: Pelister qualified for the Europa League first qualifying round by winning the 2016–17 Macedonian Football Cup.)
3	Rabotnički	36	14	12	10	49	41	+8	54	Qualification for the Europa League first qualifying round
4	Pelister	36	14	10	12	44	35	+9	52	Qualification for the Europa League first qualifying round
5	Renova	36	13	13	10	42	37	+5	52	
6	Sileks	36	11	14	11	41	43	−2	47	
7	Pobeda	36	10	11	15	34	50	−16	41	
8	Shkupi (O)	36	8	13	15	27	39	−12	37	Qualification for the relegation play-offs
9	Bregalnica (R)	36	4	12	20	39	69	−30	24	Relegation to the Macedonian Second League
10	Makedonija G.P. (R)	36	4	11	21	35	80	−45	23	Relegation to the Macedonian Second League

Source: MacedonianFootball.com, Soccerway
Rules for classification: 1) Points; 2) Goal difference; 3) Goals scored; 4) Head-to-head points; 5) Head-to-head goal difference; 6) Head-to-head away goals scored (only if two teams); 7) Head-to-head goals scored; 8) Draw; 9) Play-off. (Note: Criteria 2, 3 and 8 is only used if not deciding Champion, teams for UEFA competitions or relegation).
(C) Champions; (O) Play-off winners; (R) Relegated

== Results ==
Each team plays home-and-away against every other team in the league twice, for a total of 36 matches each.

Home \ Away	BRE	MGP	PEL	POB	RAB	REN	SKË	SKU	SIL	VAR	BRE	MGP	PEL	POB	RAB	REN	SKË	SKU	SIL	VAR
Bregalnica	—	1–2	0–0	2–3	0–0	1–1	1–1	1–0	0–2	0–1	—	1–0	1–1	1–2	6–2	0–1	1–3	3–0	3–3	3–3
Makedonija G.P.	2–2	—	2–2	1–1	0–4	3–1	0–4	0–1	1–1	0–4	5–3	—	1–2	0–0	0–3	1–3	2–3	0–0	0–1	0–5
Pelister	3–0	1–0	—	2–0	3–0	1–0	1–2	2–0	0–0	0–1	2–1	3–1	—	1–0	0–1	3–0	0–1	1–0	0–0	2–3
Pobeda	0–0	0–0	0–2	—	2–1	0–2	1–2	2–1	1–1	0–1	0–0	4–2	2–2	—	0–0	0–3	1–0	1–1	1–0	2–1
Rabotnički	1–1	2–1	0–1	3–1	—	1–0	1–3	3–1	3–1	3–0	3–1	1–1	1–1	0–3	—	0–0	1–0	0–1	2–0	2–2
Renova	1–0	1–0	2–0	1–1	1–1	—	1–2	1–0	2–2	0–0	4–0	2–2	2–1	1–0	1–1	—	4–4	2–1	1–0	0–1
Shkëndija	5–2	3–0	1–0	3–1	2–2	1–1	—	0–1	2–1	0–2	3–0	5–1	3–1	4–0	2–2	1–1	—	0–0	2–0	3–1
Shkupi	1–1	0–2	2–1	1–1	0–1	0–0	0–0	—	1–1	0–0	3–0	1–1	1–0	1–2	1–1	3–2	1–1	—	3–1	0–2
Sileks	1–0	1–1	0–0	2–1	2–1	0–0	1–3	1–0	—	1–3	3–2	4–2	3–3	2–0	0–2	3–0	1–1	1–0	—	0–1
Vardar	5–1	4–1	1–1	2–1	1–0	1–0	3–0	1–1	1–1	—	2–0	6–0	3–1	4–0	2–0	2–0	3–1	3–0	0–0	—

Source: MacedonianFootball.com
Legend: Blue = home team win; Yellow = draw; Red = away team win.

=== Positions by round ===
The table lists the positions of teams after each week of matches. In order to preserve chronological evolvements, any postponed matches are not included to the round at which they were originally scheduled, but added to the full round they were played immediately afterwards.

Team ╲ Round	1	2	3	4	5	6	7	8	9	10	11	12	13	14	15	16	17	18	19	20	21	22	23	24	25	26	27	28	29	30	31	32	33	34	35	36
Vardar	7	3	3	2	1	1	1	1	1	1	1	1	1	1	1	1	1	1	1	1	1	1	1	1	1	1	1	1	1	1	1	1	1	1	1	1
Shkëndija	3	6	7	5	6	4	2	2	2	2	2	2	2	2	2	2	2	2	2	2	2	2	2	2	2	2	2	2	2	2	2	2	2	2	2	2
Rabotnički	1	1	1	3	2	2	4	4	3	3	3	3	4	4	4	4	4	4	3	4	4	3	3	3	3	3	3	3	3	3	3	3	3	3	3	3
Pelister	2	1	2	1	3	3	3	3	4	4	4	4	3	3	3	3	3	3	4	3	3	4	4	4	4	4	4	4	4	4	4	4	4	4	4	4
Renova	5	4	5	6	4	5	5	5	5	5	5	5	5	5	5	5	6	6	5	5	5	6	5	6	6	6	6	5	5	5	5	5	5	5	5	5
Sileks	8	5	4	4	5	6	6	6	7	7	7	7	6	6	6	6	5	5	6	6	6	5	6	5	5	5	5	6	6	6	6	6	6	6	6	6
Pobeda	9	9	10	10	8	8	9	8	8	8	8	8	8	8	8	8	8	8	7	8	7	8	8	8	8	8	8	8	8	8	8	8	7	7	7	7
Shkupi	6	7	6	7	7	7	7	7	6	6	6	6	7	7	7	7	7	7	8	7	8	7	7	7	7	7	7	7	7	7	7	7	8	8	8	8
Bregalnica	4	8	9	9	9	9	8	9	9	9	10	10	10	10	10	10	10	10	10	10	10	10	10	10	10	9	9	9	9	9	9	9	9	9	10	9
Makedonija G.P.	10	10	8	8	10	10	10	10	10	10	9	9	9	9	9	9	9	9	9	9	9	9	9	9	9	10	10	10	10	10	10	10	10	10	9	10

Leader and qualification for the Champions League first qualifying round
Qualification for the Europa League first qualifying round
Qualification for the Relegation play-offs
Relegation to the Macedonian Second League

Source: macedonianfootball.com

== Relegation play-offs ==
=== First leg ===
4 June 2017
17:00 CEST

Shkupi	4–1	Novaci
Adem 12'; Grozdanoski 16' (o.g.); Mbella 31'; Arif 74'	Report	Naumoski 70'

Gradski stadion, Shtip
Attendance: 200
Referee: Aleksandar Stavrev (Skopje)

=== Second leg ===
7 June 2017
17:00 CEST

Novaci	1–3	Shkupi
Naumoski 63'	Report	Ismaili 28'; Adem 50'; Mamuti 78'

Gradski stadion, Shtip
Attendance: 20
Referee: Stojanche Stojanov (Štip)

Shkupi won 7–2 on aggregate.

== Season statistics ==
=== Top scorers ===
As of 31 May 2017

Rank	Player	Club	Goals
1	(North Macedonia) Besart Ibraimi	Shkëndija	20
2	(Serbia) Igor Nedeljković	Sileks	13
3	(North Macedonia) Ferhan Hasani	Shkëndija	12
3	(North Macedonia) Alen Jasharoski	Makedonija G.P.	12
5	(North Macedonia) Dejan Blazhevski	Vardar	11
5	(Brazil) Lucas Cardoso	Pelister	11
5	(North Macedonia) Stojancho Velinov	Bregalnica & Renova	11
5	(North Macedonia) Goran Zdravkov	Bregalnica	11
9	(Brazil) Jonathan Boareto	Vardar	10
10	(Montenegro) Damir Kojašević	Vardar	9
10	(Brazil) Juan Felipe	Vardar	9

== Attendances ==
#	Football club	Average attendance
1	KF Shkëndija	4,367
2	KF Shkupi	2,278
3	FK Pelister	1,739
4	FK Bregalnica Štip	1,411
5	FK Pobeda	1,383
6	FK Vardar	961
7	KF Renova	653
8	FK Sileks	511
9	FK Rabotnički	394
10	FK Makedonija GP	372

== See also ==
- 2016–17 Macedonian Football Cup
- 2016–17 Macedonian Second Football League
- 2016–17 Macedonian Third Football League
