= Darko Krsteski =

Macedonian footballer

Personal information
- Full name: Darko Krsteski; Дарко Крстески
- Date of birth: 9 August 1971 (age 55)
- Place of birth: Prilep, SFR Yugoslavia
- Position: Defender

Team information
- Current team: Karaorman (manager)

Senior career*
Years	Team	Apps	(Gls)
1993–1997	Pobeda	76	(3)
1997–1999	Red Star Belgrade	13	(0)
1999–2005	Sutjeska	133	(15)
2004–2007	Borac Čačak	41	(4)
2005	→ Al-Faisaly (loan)		
2007–2008	Floriana	17	(4)
2008–2009	Pobeda	21	(1)

International career
2000–2001	Macedonia	2	(0)

Managerial career
- 2009–2010: Pobeda (assistant)
- 2014: 11 Oktomvri
- 2015–2016: Pobeda
- 2017: Tikvesh
- 2018–2019: Pelister
- 2022–: Karaorman
- * Club domestic league appearances and goals

Darko Krsteski (Macedonian: Дарко Крстески; born 9 August 1971) is a Macedonian retired footballer who played as a defender.

== Club career ==
Krsteski started his career in his hometown Pobeda where he played four seasons before moving to Serbia to the ex-European champions Red Star Belgrade. After two seasons in Belgrade, he played in two more First League of FR Yugoslavia clubs, FK Sutjeska Nikšić in Montenegro, where he played almost six seasons, and FK Borac Čačak from Central Serbia. Before returning to his hometown club, he had a short spelt with the Jordanian club Al-Faisaly SC and he played one season in Malta in Floriana.

== International career ==
Krsteski made his senior debut for Macedonia in a July 2000 friendly match against Azerbaijan and has earned a total of 2 caps, scoring no goals. His second and final international was a March 2001 FIFA World Cup qualification match against Turkey.

== Honours ==
Red Star Belgrade

- FR Yugoslavia Cup: 1998–99
