= FK Pobeda (2010) =

FK Pobeda AD
- Full name: Fudbalski klub Pobeda AD Prilep; Фудбалски клуб Победа АД Прилеп
- Nickname: Мајмуни (Monkeys)
- Founded: Officially in 1945; 81 years ago (As Goce Delchev) In 2010; 16 years ago (as Viktorija)
- Dissolved: 2026; 0 years ago
- Ground: Goce Delčev Stadium
- Capacity: 15,000
- 2025–26: Macedonian Second League, 15th (relegated)
Home colours	Away colours

FK Pobeda AD Prilep (Macedonian: ФК Победа АД Прилеп) was a football club based in the city of Prilep, North Macedonia. They are recently competed in the Macedonian Second League.

== History ==
The club was founded in 2010 as Viktorija (eventually renaming to Pobeda Junior) after the FK Pobeda was banned by FIFA for eight years. Legally, the two clubs' track records and honors are kept separate by the Football Federation of Macedonia.

In 2015, Pobeda Junior was renamed to match the name of the old club that was suspended, Pobeda.

The club was promoted to the Macedonian First League for the first time after finishing 1st in the 2015–16 Macedonian Second League. The club managed to stay in the First League for 3 seasons until it was relegated in the 2018-19 Macedonian First League, finishing in 10th.

Pobeda eventually returned to the First League after winning the Eastern group of the 2021–22 Macedonian Second League.

== Honours ==
(North Macedonia) Macedonian Second League

- Winners (2): 2015–16 and 2021–22

== Recent seasons ==
Season	League									Cup	Top goalscorer	
Season	Division	P	W	D	L	F	A	Pts	Pos	Cup	Player	Goals
2010–11	3. MFL South	29	26	3	0	97	16	81	1st ↑			
2011–12	2. MFL	30	12	5	13	36	38	41	11th	R1		
2012–13	2. MFL	30	12	3	15	24	34	39	7th	R2		
2013–14	2. MFL	29	12	7	10	44	30	43	9th ↓			
2014–15	3. MFL South	21	19	1	1	78	11	58	1st ↑	R2		
2015–16	2. MFL	27	13	8	6	40	23	47	1st ↑	R1	Blagoja Geshoski	12
2016–17	1. MFL	36	10	11	15	34	50	41	7th	QF	Blagoja Geshoski; Nikolche Sharkoski	8
2017–18	1. MFL	36	10	8	18	36	56	38	8th	QF	Zoran Danoski	8
2018–19	1. MFL	36	6	5	25	26	76	23	10th ↓	SF	Kyrian Nwabueze; Gjorgji Tanushev	6
2019–20^{1}	2. MFL East	16	3	3	10	17	29	12	8th	N/A	Blagoja Geshoski	7
2020–21	2. MFL East	27	6	9	12	30	35	27	8th	R1	Darko Grozdanoski	6
2021–22	2. MFL East	27	19	5	3	64	21	62	1st ↑	R1	Bojan Spirkoski	20
2022–23	1. MFL	30	3	4	23	18	78	13	11th ↓	R2	Atdhe Mazari	4
2023–24	2. MFL	30	6	10	14	28	45	28	14th	R1	David Debreshlioski	4
2024–25	2. MFL	30	8	9	13	28	34	33	12th	R1	Nikola Taleski	10
2025–26	2. MFL	30	3	2	25	19	117	11	15th ↓↓	R1	Stefan Nastoski; Arsenij Solevski	2

^{1}The 2019–20 season was abandoned due to the COVID-19 pandemic in North Macedonia.

== Historical list of coaches ==
- (North Macedonia) Mosa Marjanovic srbija
- (North Macedonia) Darko Krsteski (Jul 2015 – Sep 2016)
- (North Macedonia) Zoran Shterjovski (Sep 2016 – Sep 2017)
- (Montenegro) Slavoljub Bubanja (Sep 2017 – Mar 2018)
- (Serbia) Slobodan Krčmarević (Mar 2018 - Apr 2018)
- (North Macedonia) Toni Meglenski (Apr 2018 – Nov 2018)
- (North Macedonia) Jane Nikoloski (Nov 2018 - Mar 2019)
- (North Macedonia) Toni Meglenski (Mar 2019 - Jun 2019)
- (North Macedonia) Darko Krsteski (Jan 2020 - Dec 2021)
- (North Macedonia) Dimitar Kapinkovski (Jan 2022 - Jun 2022)
- (North Macedonia) Boban Babunski (Jul 2022 - Jan 2023)
- (North Macedonia) Blagojce Damevski (Jan 2023 - Jul 2023)
- (North Macedonia) Filip Mircheski (Jul 2023 - )
