= FC AP Brera Strumica =

Macedonian association football club

Brera Strumica
- Full name: Fudbalski Klub Akademija Pandev Brera Strumica
- Founded: 2010; 16 years ago
- Ground: Sports Center Pandev
- Capacity: 1,500
- Owner(s): Brera Holdings (90%); Goran Pandev (10%)
- President: Vančo Stojanov
- Manager: Martin Alagjozovski
- League: Macedonian Second League
- 2025–26: Macedonian First League, 9th of 12 (relegated)
- Website: brerastrumica.com
Home colours	Away colours

Fudbalski Klub Akademija Pandev Brera Strumica (Macedonian: ФК Академија Пандев Брера Струмица), commonly known as AP Brera Strumica, is a Macedonian football club based in Strumica, which competes in the Macedonian Second League.

== History ==
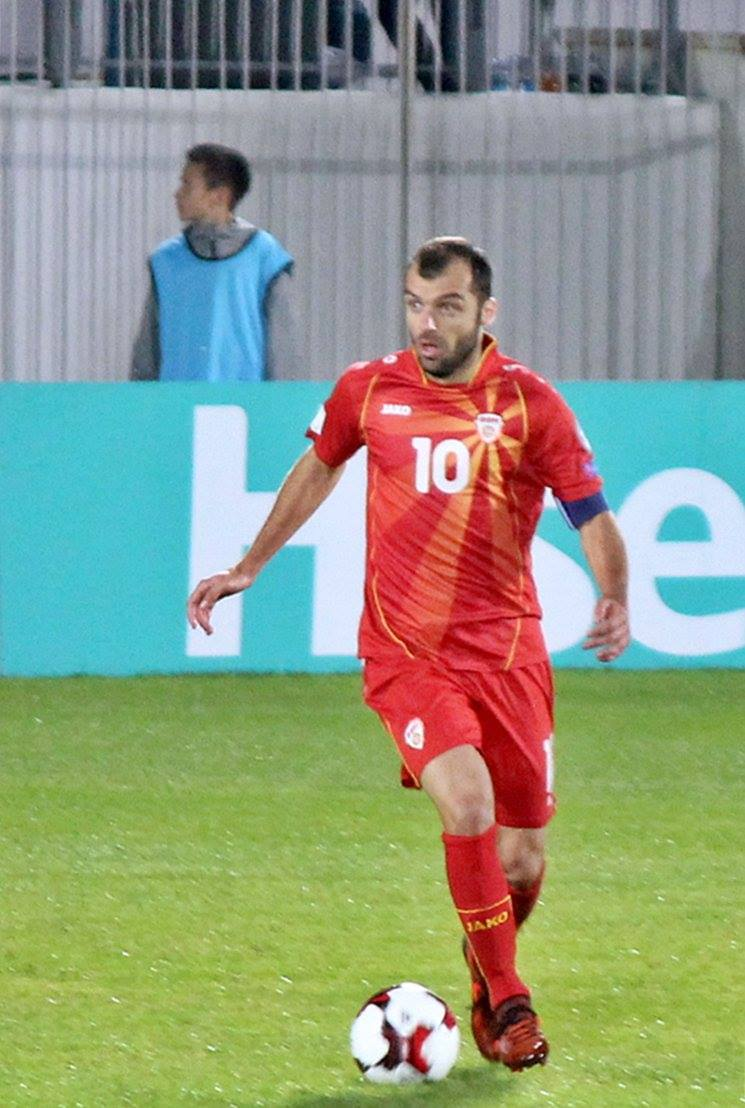
Goran Pandev, the clubs founder.

The club was founded in 2010 as FK Akademija Pandev by the Macedonian football player Goran Pandev, after whom the academy was named. As of 2014, AP Brera has a senior team competing in the Macedonian senior leagues and in 2017, the senior team was promoted to the Macedonian First League for the first time in its history.

In February 2018, the team moved to play their home games at Stadion Kukuš due to a disagreement over rent with FK Belasica. In the 2018–19 season they won the Macedonian Football Cup winning beating Makedonija G.P on penalties after a 2–2 draw. Akademija won 4–2 on Penalties 6–4 in aggregate.

In August 2022, Goran Pandev and Italian based side Brera Calcio entered into a sponsorship agreement which would see both sides establish a closer relationship. On 31 May 2023, Akademija Pandev was successfully acquired by Brera Holdings PLC, the holding company of Brera Calcio, with the company receiving 90% of the club's shares. On 26 June 2023, the club was officially renamed to FC Akademija Pandev Brera Strumica.

=== Emblem's evolution ===
Akademija Pandev's logo until 2017	Akademija Pandev's logo until 2023

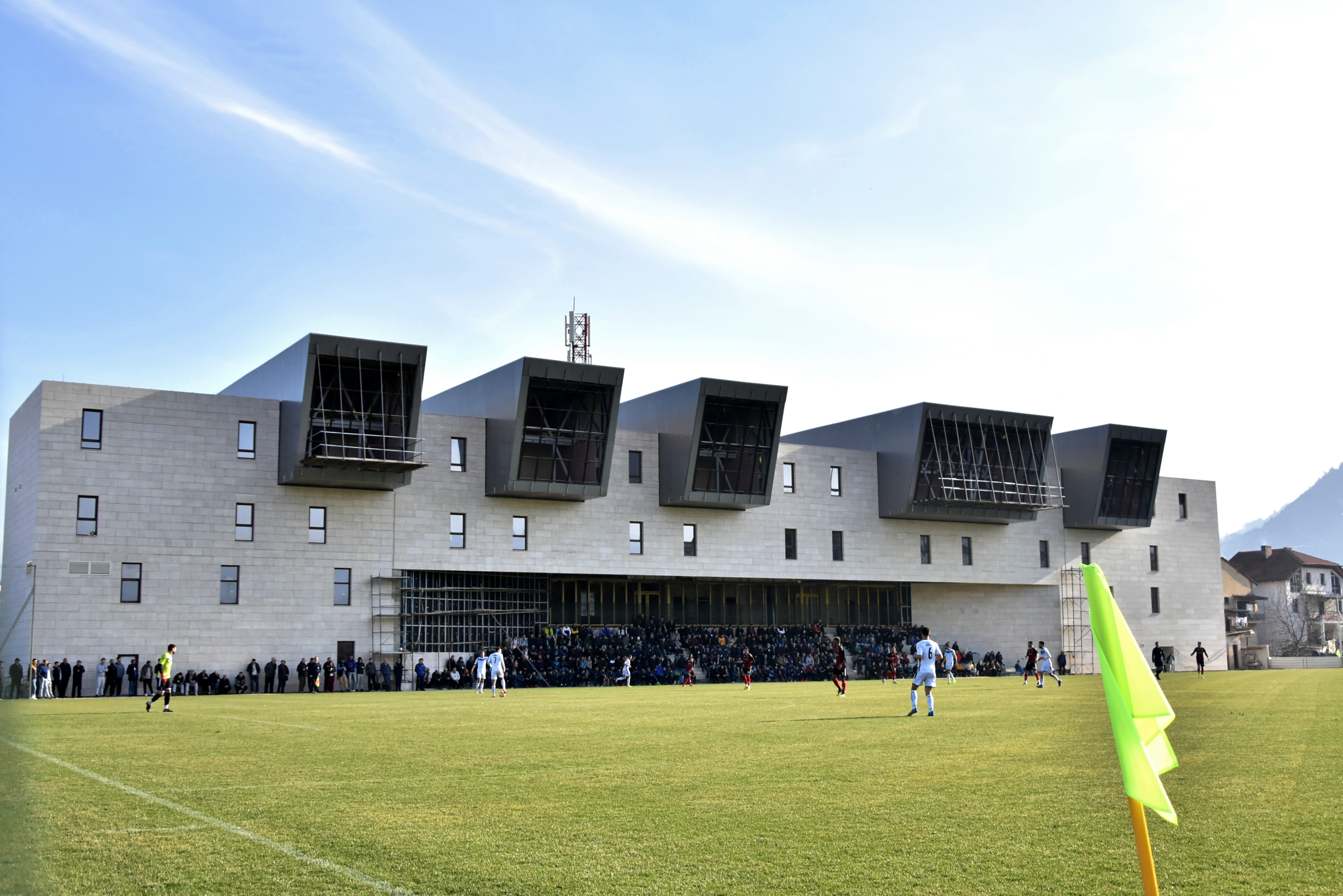
Sports Center "Pandev", home of AP Brera.

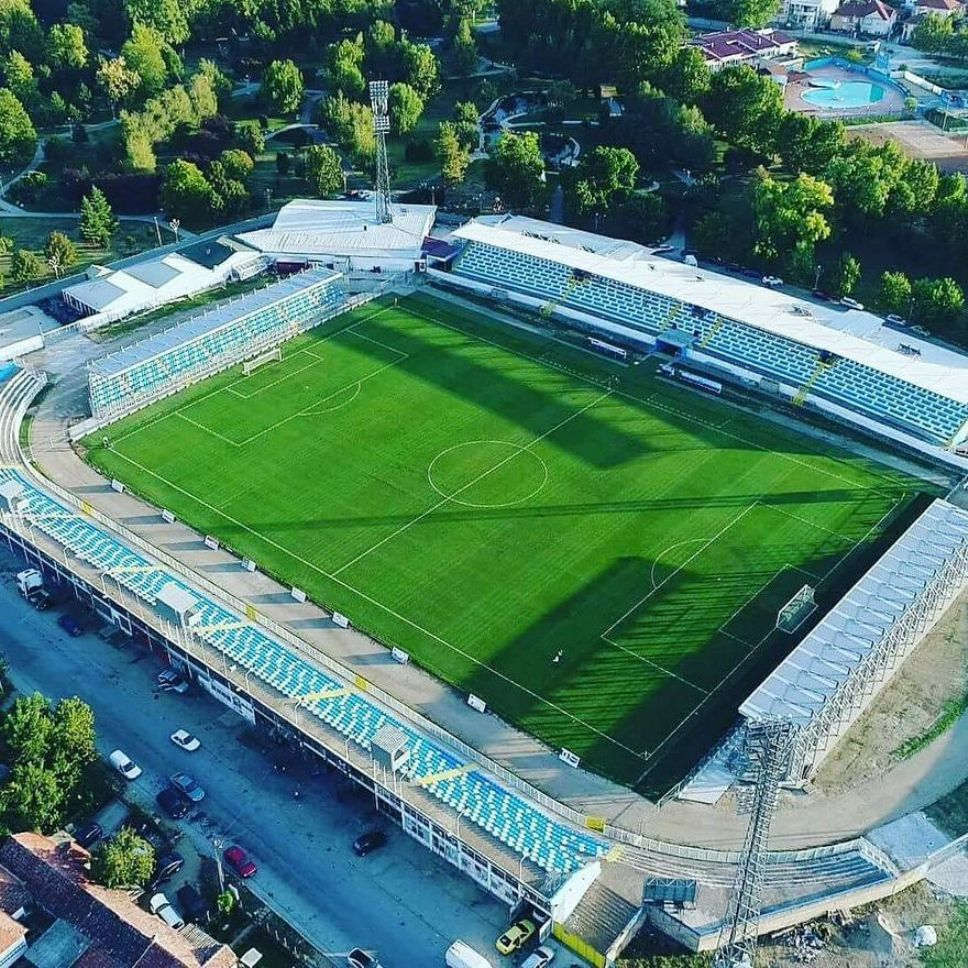
Stadium Blagoj Istatov (also known as Stadion Mladost)

== Home ground ==
AP Brera plays its home games at its very own Sports Center "Pandev". Opened in 2020, it has a single pitch with a single 1,500 seating capacity stand, and is also equipped with a hotel and the club's administrative facilities. It is also where its youth categories play and train.

Mladost Stadium is a multi-purpose stadium in Strumica, Republic of North Macedonia. It is currently used mostly for football matches and the stadium's capacity is 6,500 spectators. With the last reconstruction in 2017 the stadium has a capacity of 9,200 seats, and it is a third-class field in accordance with UEFA standards. It meets the conditions for a high-ranking competition and is the second such stadium in the country.

== Honours ==
- (North Macedonia) Macedonian First League
  - Runners-up (1): 2021–22
- (North Macedonia) Macedonian Second League
  - Winners (1): 2016–17
- (North Macedonia) Macedonian Third Football League East
  - Winners (1): 2015–16
- (North Macedonia) Macedonian Football Cup
  - Winners (1): 2018–19
  - Runners-up (1): 2020–21

== Recent seasons ==
Season	League									Cup	European competitions		Top goalscorer	
Season	Division	P	W	D	L	F	A	Pts	Pos	Cup	European competitions		Player	Goals
2014–15	OFL Strumica	?	?	?	?	?	?	?	1st ↑					
2015–16	3. MFL East	22	20	2	0	94	6	62	1st ↑					
2016–17	2. MFL	27	21	3	3	69	24	66	1st ↑	R2				
2017–18	1. MFL	36	10	12	14	43	47	42	6th	SF			Zoran Baldovaliev	14
2018–19	1. MFL	36	17	7	12	45	35	58	3rd	W			Ljupcho Doriev	16
2019–20^{1}	1. MFL	23	7	7	9	20	20	28	7th	N/A	Europa League	QR1	Marko Rajković	4
2020–21	1. MFL	33	12	5	16	32	36	41	7th	RU			Mario Krstovski	7
2021–22	1. MFL	33	19	7	7	55	32	64	2nd	R2			Martin Mirčevski	16
2022–23	1. MFL	30	6	10	14	34	38	28	9th	QF	Europa Conference League	QR1	Kristijan Velinovski	6
2023–24	1. MFL	33	11	9	13	34	33	42	7th	QF			Đorđe Ivković	8
2024–25	1. MFL	33	9	7	17	41	56	34	9th	SF			Martin Gjorgievski; Đorđe Ivković	9
2025–26	1. MFL	33	10	10	13	46	56	40	9th ↓	R1			Fahd Ndzengue	8

^{1}The 2019–20 season was abandoned due to the COVID-19 pandemic in North Macedonia.

== European record ==
As of 14 July 2022

Season	Competition	Round	Club	Home	Away	Agg.
2019–20	UEFA Europa League	1QR	(Bosnia and Herzegovina) Zrinjski Mostar	0–3	0–3	0–6
2022–23	UEFA Europa Conference League	1QR	(Poland) Lechia Gdańsk	1–2	1–4	2–6

Notes

- QR: Qualifying round

== Players ==
=== Current squad ===
As of 12 September 2025

Note: Flags indicate national team as defined under FIFA eligibility rules; some limited exceptions apply. Players may hold more than one non-FIFA nationality.

No.	Pos.	Nation	Player
1	GK	MKD	Slave Vrgov
3	DF	MKD	Andrej Velkov
6	MF	MKD	Kamencho Andonovski
7	FW	SRB	Leonardo Petrović
8	MF	MKD	Mile Todorov
9	FW	MKD	Nikola Velichkovski
10	FW	MKD	Kire Stojanov
11	FW	MKD	Igor Ristov
19	FW	MKD	Ivan Tanhev
20	DF	MKD	Zoran Ivanovski
21	DF	SRB	Luka Luković
22	MF	MKD	Filip Mihailov

No.	Pos.	Nation	Player
23	DF	MKD	Viktor Velkoski
24	DF	MKD	Marko Stojilevski
25	FW	MAW	Kouadio Yann Kouakou
26	MF	MKD	Gjorgji Doshev
28	MF	DJI	Warsama Hassan
32	DF	MKD	Filip Antovski (captain)
33	MF	MKD	Andrej Arizankoski
82	GK	MKD	David Illoski
88	MF	BIH	Emrah Makić
90	GK	MKD	Daniel Dikovski
91	MF	MKD	Bojan Velkov
99	FW	MKD	Gabriel Taleski

=== Youth players ===
Players from the U19 Youth Team that have been summoned with the first team in the current season.

Note: Flags indicate national team as defined under FIFA eligibility rules; some limited exceptions apply. Players may hold more than one non-FIFA nationality.

No.	Pos.	Nation	Player
4	DF	MKD	Mario Mitrev
5	MF	MKD	Viktor Delov
15	MF	MKD	Ivan Tanchev
18	FW	MKD	Matej Sejmenov

No.	Pos.	Nation	Player
29	FW	MKD	Ivan Shirikj
41	GK	MKD	Metodi Davchev
82	GK	MKD	David Iloski

=== Out on loan ===
Note: Flags indicate national team as defined under FIFA eligibility rules; some limited exceptions apply. Players may hold more than one non-FIFA nationality.

No.	Pos.	Nation	Player

=== Notable players ===
Some notable players to have played for AP Brera are:

- Jani Atanasov
- Bojan Dimoski
- Ljupcho Doriev
- Dimitar Mitrovski
- Sashko Pandev
- Vanche Shikov
- Aco Stojkov

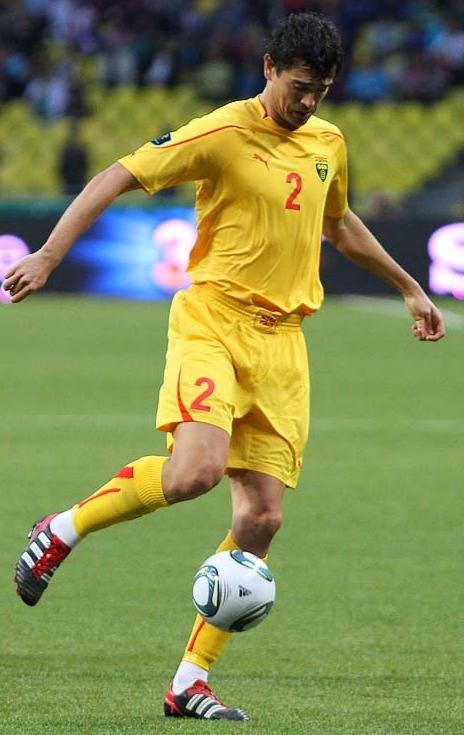
Vanche Shikov

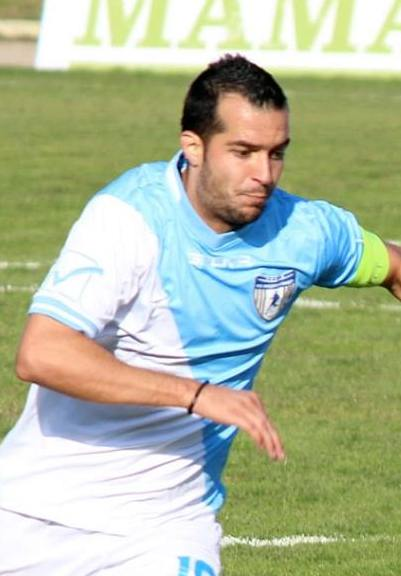
Sashko Pandev

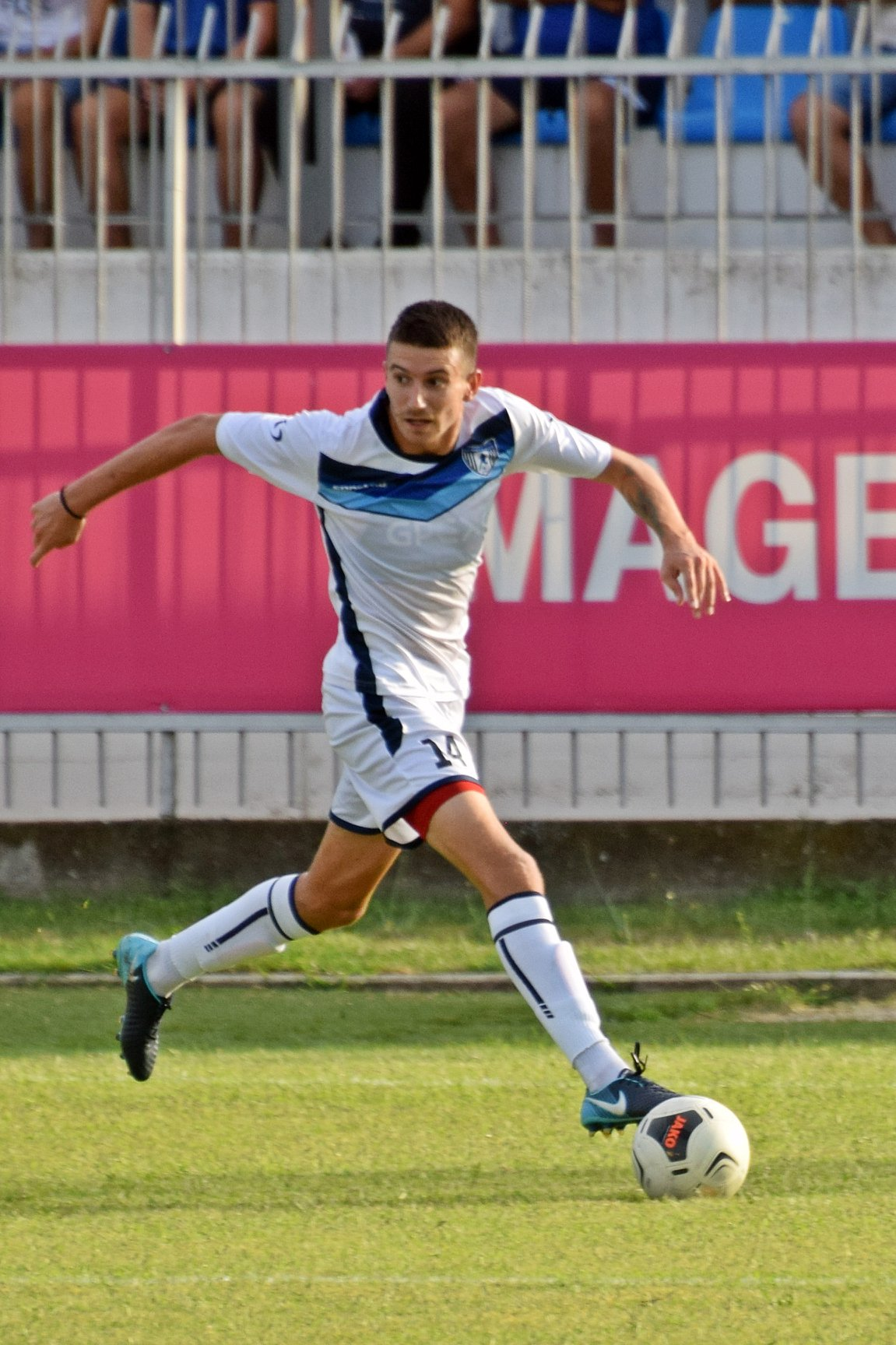
Ljupcho Doriev

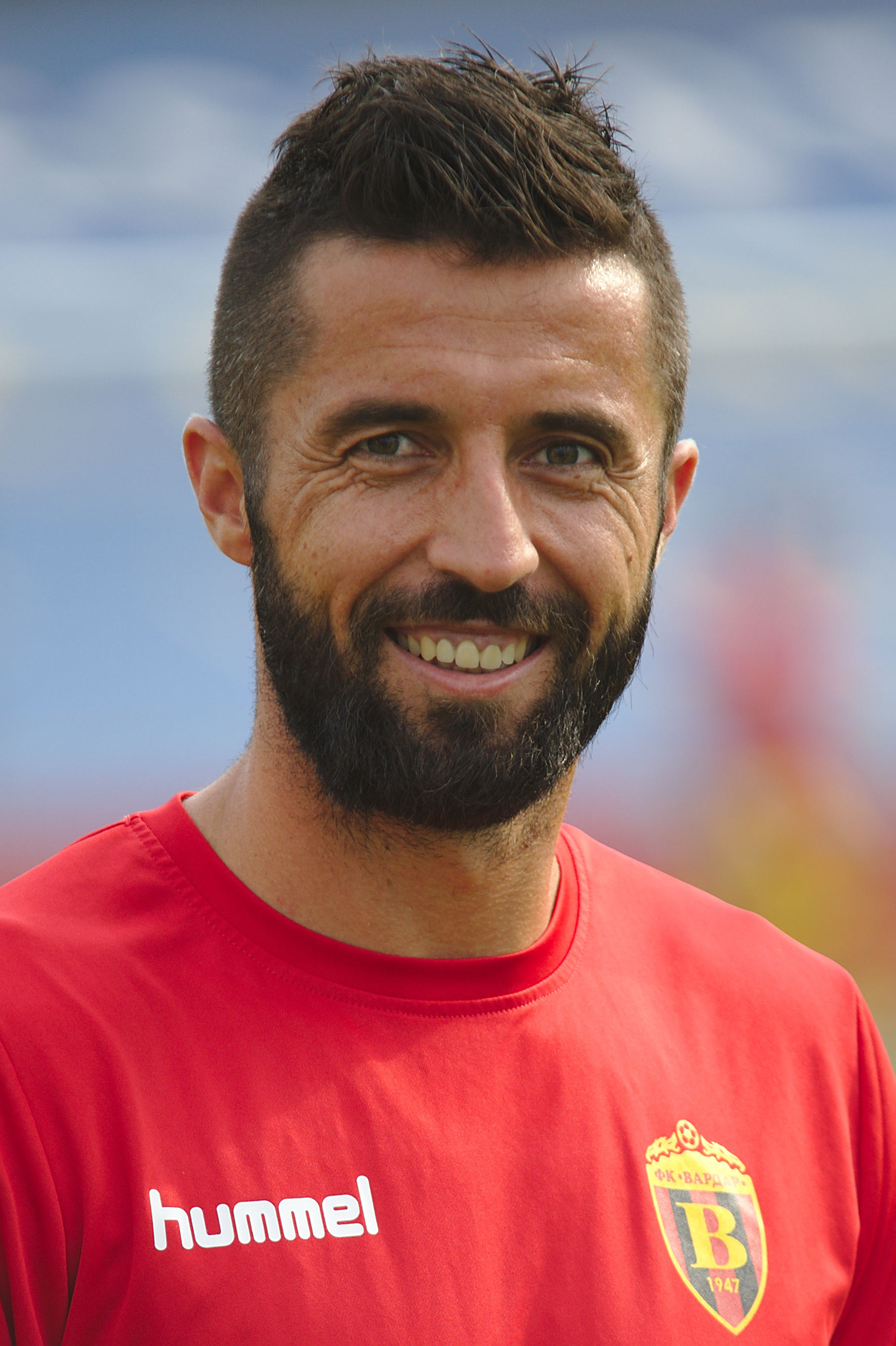
Aco Stojkov
