= Jani Atanasov =

Macedonian footballer (born 1999)

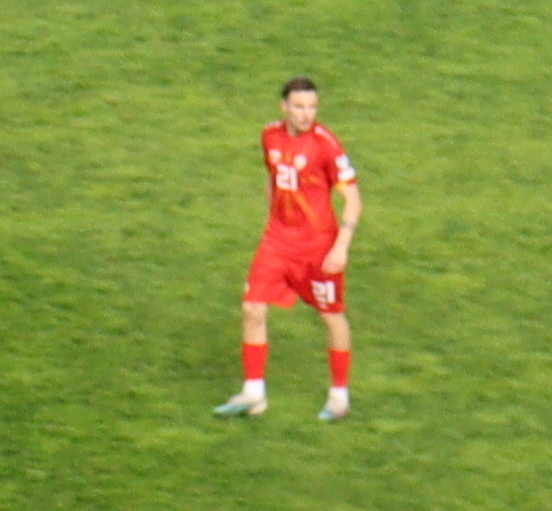
- Atanasov playing for North Macedonia in 2023

Personal information
- Date of birth: 31 October 1999 (age 27)
- Place of birth: Strumica, Macedonia
- Height: 1.87 m (6 ft 2 in)
- Position: Midfielder

Team information
- Current team: Aktobe
- Number: 6

Youth career
- 2013–2017: Akademija Pandev

Senior career*
Years	Team	Apps	(Gls)
2017–2018	Akademija Pandev	54	(13)
2018–2020	Bursaspor	11	(0)
2020–2023	Hajduk Split	55	(4)
2023–2025	Cracovia	59	(6)
2025	→ Puszcza Niepołomice (loan)	9	(2)
2025–2026	AEL	31	(1)
2026–	Aktobe	16	(2)

International career^{‡}
2015	Macedonia U17	3	(0)
2017–2018	Macedonia U19	8	(3)
2018–2020	North Macedonia U21	11	(6)
2021–	North Macedonia	35	(3)
- * Club domestic league appearances and goals as of 1 November 2026 ‡ National team caps and goals as of 00:05, 17 November 2026 (UTC)

Jani Atanasov (Macedonian: Јани Атанасов; born 31 October 1999) is a Macedonian professional footballer who plays as a midfielder for Kazakhstan Premier League club Aktobe and the North Macedonia national team.

== Club career ==
On 5 June 2018, Atanasov joined Bursaspor after a successful debut season with Akademija Pandev in the Macedonian First Football League. He made his professional debut with Bursaspor in a 2–1 Süper Lig loss to Fenerbahçe on 11 August 2018.

On 8 September 2020, Atanasov was announced as a new Hajduk Split player, signing a three-year contract. He arrived as a free transfer, having terminated his contract with Bursaspor, and was given the number 20 shirt.

On 23 January 2023, he was transferred to Polish club Cracovia for an undisclosed fee, signing a three-and-a-half-year contract.

On 19 February 2025, Atanasov moved on loan to fellow top-flight club Puszcza Niepołomice until the end of the season.

== International career ==
Atanasov holds dual Macedonian and Bulgarian citizenship, being eligible to play for both national teams. On 11 November 2021, Atanasov made his international debut for North Macedonia, substituting Eljif Elmas at 83rd minute of the 2022 FIFA World Cup qualification match against Armenia, which North Macedonia won by 5–0.

== Career statistics ==
=== International ===
As of match played 16 November 2026

Appearances and goals by national team and year
National team	Year	Apps	Goals
North Macedonia
North Macedonia	2021	1	0
North Macedonia	2022	3	0
North Macedonia	2023	10	2
North Macedonia	2024	8	1
North Macedonia	2025	7	0
North Macedonia	2026	6	0
Total		35	3

Scores and results list North Macedonia's goal tally first, score column indicates score after each Atanasov goal.

List of international goals scored by Jani Atanasov
No.	Date	Venue	Opponent	Score	Result	Competition
1	17 November 2023	Stadio Olimpico, Rome, Italy	Italy	1–3	2–5	UEFA Euro 2024 qualifying
2	17 November 2023	Stadio Olimpico, Rome, Italy	Italy	2–3	2–5	UEFA Euro 2024 qualifying
3	10 October 2024	Skonto Stadium, Riga, Latva	Latvia	0–1	0–3	2024–25 UEFA Nations League C

== Honours ==
Akademija Pandev

- Macedonian Second Football League: 2016–17

Hajduk Split

- Croatian Cup: 2021–22
