= Besart Ibraimi =

Macedonian footballer (born 1986)

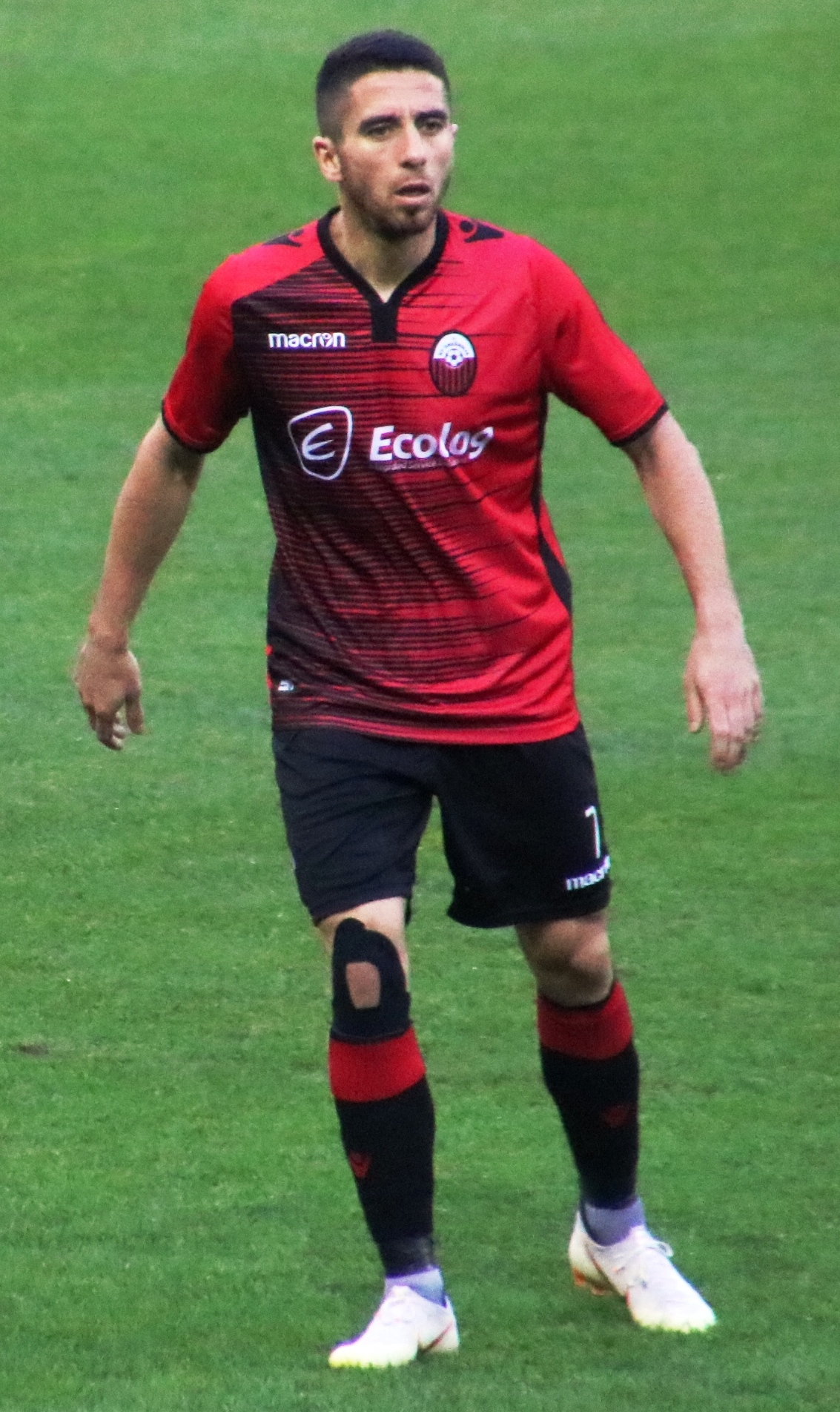

Personal information
- Full name: Besart Ibraimi; Бесарт Ибраими
- Date of birth: 17 December 1986 (age 39)
- Place of birth: Kičevo, SR Macedonia, SFR Yugoslavia
- Height: 1.84 m (6 ft 0 in)
- Position: Striker

Team information
- Current team: Shkëndija
- Number: 7

Youth career
- 1993–2007: Vëllazërimi

Senior career*
Years	Team	Apps	(Gls)
2005–2008	Vëllazërimi	32	(4)
2007–2008	Napredok	43	(14)
2008–2010	Renova	42	(25)
2010–2011	Schalke 04	2	(0)
2011–2014	Sevastopol	43	(12)
2011	→ Tavriya Simferopol (loan)	2	(0)
2013	→ Metalurh Zaporizhzhia (loan)	11	(4)
2014	Enosis Neon Paralimni	8	(6)
2014–2015	Ermis Aradippou	23	(9)
2015–2021	Shkëndija	175	(111)
2021–2022	Xanthi	13	(4)
2022–2024	Struga	58	(34)
2024–	Shkëndija	57	(26)

International career
2009–2022	North Macedonia	17	(0)
- * Club domestic league appearances and goals

Besart Ibraimi (Macedonian: Бесарт Ибраими; born 17 December 1986) is a Macedonian professional footballer who currently plays as a striker for KF Shkëndija. He is the all-time top goalscorer in the 1.MFL with 200 goals.

Ibraimi recently reached 150 goals for the Macedonian football team,KF Shkëndija.

== Early life ==
Born in Kičevo, North Macedonia. He is Macedonian by nationality but is ethnically Albanian by ethnos. Ibraimi began playing football in his hometown Kičevo for the youth of FK Vlazrimi.

== Club career ==
Ibraimi began his professional career 2005 with FK Vlazrimi (meaning Brotherhood), earning 32 caps and scoring 11 goals, before joining FK Napredok in January 2007. He played for FK Napredok for one season, 2007–08, playing 43 games and scoring 19 goals. In September 2008, he signed for FK Renova. He left Macedonia and his club FK Renova on 12 January 2010 for German Bundesliga club FC Schalke 04. He made his Schalke debut on 6 February 2010 in an away game against SC Freiburg coming on in the 77th minute as a substitute.

Ibraimi only made six appearances for the first team of Schalke 04 before he was transferred to the Schalke 04 II team in the summer of 2010. Ibraimi could participate in training with Schalke 04 II but since he is a non EU player, he could not play in league games for Schalke 04 II. After a half year, he signed on 26 January 2011 with the Ukrainian club PFK Sevastopol.

In January 2014, Ibraimi ended his contract with PFK Sevastopol and joined the Cypriot club Enosis Paralimini. After showing his impressive qualities in Enosis Paralimini all "the elite" clubs in Cypriot First Division ran after Besart Ibraimi, he finally decided to move to Ermis Aradippou where he signed a contract for one year. He made his debut with Ermis Aradippou on 1 September 2014, in the 56th minute of the match against Apollon Limassol.

== International career ==
Ibraimi chose to represent North Macedonia, his birthplace over Albania. Ibraimi is a former member of the U-21 team. He made his senior debut for North Macedonia in a September 2009 FIFA World Cup qualification match away against Scotland and has earned a total of 15 caps, scoring no goals.

== Career statistics ==
=== Club ===
Club	Season	League			Cup		Continental		Others		Total	
Club	Season	Division	Apps	Goals	Apps	Goals	Apps	Goals	Apps	Goals	Apps	Goals
Vlazrimi	2005-06	Macedonian First Football League	22	2	-		-		-		22	2
Vlazrimi	2006-07	Macedonian First Football League	10	2	-		-		-		10	2
Napredok	2006-07	Macedonian First Football League	18	2	-		-		-		18	2
Napredok	2007-08	Macedonian First Football League	25	12	-		-		-		25	12
Renova	2008-09	Macedonian First Football League	26	13	-		-		-		26	13
Renova	2009-10	Macedonian First Football League	16	12	-		2	2	-		18	14
Schalke 04	2009-10	Bundesliga	2	0	-		-		-		2	0
Sevastopol	2010-11	Ukrainian Premier League	11	3	-		-		-		11	3
Tavriya Simferopol	2011-12	Ukrainian Premier League	2	0	-		-		-		2	0
Sevastopol	2011-12	Ukrainian First League	21	8	1	0	-		-		22	8
Sevastopol	2012-13	Ukrainian First League	11	1	-		-		-		11	1
Metalurh Zaporizhzhia	2012-13	Ukrainian Premier League	11	0	-		-		-		11	0
Sevastopol	2013-14	Ukrainian Premier League	0	0	1	0	-		-		1	0
Enosis Neon Paralimni	2013-14	Cypriot First Division	8	6	1	0	-		-		9	6
Ermis Aradippou	2014-15	Cypriot First Division	23	2	4	2	-		-		27	4
Shkëndija	2015-16	Macedonian First Football League	32	25	5	1	2	0	-		39	26
Shkëndija	2016-17	Macedonian First Football League	30	20	6	5	8	4	-		44	29
Shkëndija	2017-18	Macedonian First Football League	32	23	3	8	8	5	-		43	36
Shkëndija	2018-19	Macedonian First Football League	11	11	0	0	6	5	-		17	16
Shkëndija	2019-20	Macedonian First Football League	23	6	4	3	4	0	-		31	9
Shkëndija	2020-21	Macedonian First Football League	32	24	1	0	3	2	-		36	26
Shkëndija	2021-22	Macedonian First Football League	5	2	0	0	4	0	-		9	2
Shkëndija	2024-25	Macedonian First Football League	30	15							30	15
Shkëndija	2025-26	Macedonian First Football League	27	11	2	1	16	1			45	13
Shkëndija	Total		222	137	21	18	51	17	-		294	172
Xanthi	2021-22	Super League Greece 2	13	4	1	0	-		-		14	4
Struga	2022-23	Macedonian First Football League	29	19	3	0	-		-		32	19
Struga	2023-24	Macedonian First Football League	29	15	0	0	8	7	-		37	22
Struga	2024-25	Macedonian First Football League	0	0	0	0	4	4	0	0	4	4
Struga	Total		58	34	3	0	12	11	0	0	73	45
Total career			499	238	32	20	65	30	-		596	288

== Honours ==
Shkëndija

- Macedonian First Football League: 2017–18, 2018–19, 2020–21, 2024–25
- Macedonian Football Cup: 2015–16, 2017–18

Struga Trim-Lum

- Macedonian First Football League: 2022–23, 2023–24

Renova

- Macedonian First Football League: 2009–10

Individual

- Macedonian Footballer of the Year: 2009, 2016

Records

- 24/25 Prva Makedonska Fudbalska Liga: 15 Goals
- 22/23 Prva Makedonska Fudbalska Liga: 19 Goals
- 20/21 Prva Makedonska Fudbalska Liga: 24 Goals
- 17/18 Prva Makedonska Fudbalska Liga: 22 Goals
- 16/17 Prva Makedonska Fudbalska Liga: 20 Goals
- 15/16 Prva Makedonska Fudbalska Liga: 25 Goals
