= Ljupčo Markovski =

Yugoslav and Macedonian footballer

Personal information
- Full name: Ljupčo Markovski; Љупчо Марковски
- Date of birth: 24 February 1967 (age 59)
- Place of birth: Skopje, SR Macedonia, Yugoslavia
- Position: Centre back

Team information
- Current team: Rabotnički

Youth career
- Vardar

Senior career*
Years	Team	Apps	(Gls)
1985–1993	Vardar	98	(8)
1993–1995	CSKA Sofia	47	(0)
1995–1999	Vardar	51	(1)

International career
1993–1998	Macedonia	30	(1)

Managerial career
- 2005–2006: Macedonia (assistant)
- 2008–2009: Rabotnički (assistant)
- 2009–2014: Skopje
- 2014–2017: Vardar (youth coach)
- 2017–2022: Skopje
- 2022–: Rabotnički
- * Club domestic league appearances and goals

Ljupčo Markovski (Macedonian: Љупчо Марковски; born 24 February 1967) is a Macedonian football manager and former player who played as a central defender. As of 2022–23 season, he is the coach of FK Rabotnički.

== International career ==
He made his senior debut for Macedonia in an October 1993 friendly match away against Slovenia, which was his country's first ever official match, and has earned a total of 30 caps, scoring 1 goal. His final international was a June 1998 friendly match against Bosnia and Herzegovina.

== Honours ==
As player:

- FK Vardar
  - Macedonian Prva Liga:
    - Winner: 1992–93, 1993–94, 1994–95
  - Macedonian Cup:
    - Winner: 1992–93, 1994–95, 1997–98, 1998–99
    - Runner-up: 1995-96

As coach:

- FK Rabotnicki
  - Macedonian Cup: 1
    - Winner: 2008–09
