= Blagoja Gesoski =

Macedonian footballer (born 1981)

Personal information
- Date of birth: 28 April 1981 (age 45)
- Place of birth: Prilep, SFR Yugoslavia
- Height: 1.93 m (6 ft 4 in)
- Position: Forward

Youth career
- Pobeda

Senior career*
Years	Team	Apps	(Gls)
1999–2008	Pobeda	97	(54)
2008–2009	Milano Kumanovo	26	(12)
2009	Metalurg	10	(1)
2010	Diagoras	1	(0)
2010–2011	Kastrioti	14	(2)
2011–2012	11 Oktomvri	31	(13)
2012–2013	Vardar	7	(0)
2013	Korzo		
2013–2020	Pobeda	129	(36)
- * Club domestic league appearances and goals

Blagoja Gesoski (Macedonian: Благоја Гесоски; born 28 April 1981) is a Macedonian former professional footballer played as a forward for clubs in Macedonia, Greece and Albania. He now works as the director of football at Pobeda.

== Career ==
Born in Prilep, Gesoski played for local side FK Pobeda, leading the Macedonian league in goal-scoring three times and winning the 2003–04 and 2006–07 championships. After ten seasons with Pobeda, he would join Macedonian sides FK Milano Kumanovo and FK Metalurg Skopje for short spells.

Gesoski joined Greek second division side Diagoras F.C. on a six-month contract in January 2010.

Gesoski joined the reformed Pobeda in June 2013, where he played for almost 7 years and helped the club return to the Macedonian First League.

Gesoski retired as a player at the end of the first half of the 2020–21 season.
