= Suat Zendeli =

Footballer

Personal information
- Full name: Suat Zendeli
- Date of birth: 24 February 1981 (age 45)
- Place of birth: Ljuboten, Skopje, SFR Yugoslavia
- Height: 1.91 m (6 ft 3 in)
- Position: Goalkeeper

Senior career*
Years	Team	Apps	(Gls)
1999–2004	Sloga Jugomagnat	4	(0)
2002–2003	→ Dinamo Tirana (loan)	0	(0)
2004–2005	Bashkimi	32	(0)
2005–2006	Dinamo Tirana	0	(0)
2006–2007	Apolonia Fier	12	(0)
2007–2009	Besa Kavajë	38	(0)
2009–2011	Shkëndija	49	(0)
2011	Petrolul Ploiești	6	(0)
2012–2014	Renova	56	(0)
2014–2018	Shkupi	101	(0)
- * Club domestic league appearances and goals as of 25 September 2011

Suat Zendeli (Macedonian: Суат Зендели; born 24 February 1981) is an Albanian Macedonian retired football player. He last played for FK Shkupi as a goalkeeper, where he was club captain in 2018. He retired in November 2018 and took a position with Shkupi's management team.

== Club career ==
Zendeli won the championship in 2011 with Shkëndija and the cup in 2012 with FK Renova.

Zendeli played for Renova in the UEFA Europa League qualifiers.

In his last professional season with KF Shkupi, Zendeli captained a UEFA Europa League qualifier tie against Steven Gerrards Rangers where Shkupi lost 2–0 on aggregate.
