= Toni Meglenski =

Macedonian footballer

Personal information
- Full name: Toni Meglenski
- Date of birth: 22 May 1981 (age 45)
- Place of birth: Prilep, SFR Yugoslavia
- Height: 1.80 m (5 ft 11 in)
- Position: Midfielder

Team information
- Current team: FK Pobeda (manager)

Senior career*
Years	Team	Apps	(Gls)
2000–2007	Pobeda	194	(22)
2007	Međimurje	0	(0)
2008	Elbasani	14	(0)
2008	Vardar	7	(0)
2009	Elbasani	10	(0)
2009–2010	Pobeda	18	(0)
2011	OFK Petrovac	5	(0)
2011–2012	11 Oktomvri	3	(0)
2012	Pobeda Junior		
2013	Pelister	10	(0)
2013–2016	Pobeda		
2017	Tikvesh	6	(0)

International career^{‡}
2003–2005	Macedonia	3	(0)

Managerial career
- 2018: Pobeda
- 2019-: Pobeda
- * Club domestic league appearances and goals as of 16 May 2009 ‡ National team caps and goals as of 16 May 2009

Toni Meglenski (Macedonian: Тони Мегленски; born 22 May 1981) is a former Macedonian football player and manager. He is the current manager of FK Pobeda.

== Playing career ==
=== International ===
He made his senior debut for Macedonia in a February 2003 friendly match against Poland and has earned a total of 3 caps. His final international was a November 2005 friendly against Liechtenstein.

== Honours ==
- Pobeda Prilep
  - Macedonian First League: 2
    - Winner: 2003–04, 2006–07
  - Macedonian Cup: 1
    - Winner: 2001–02
