= Ljupcho Doriev =

Macedonian association football player

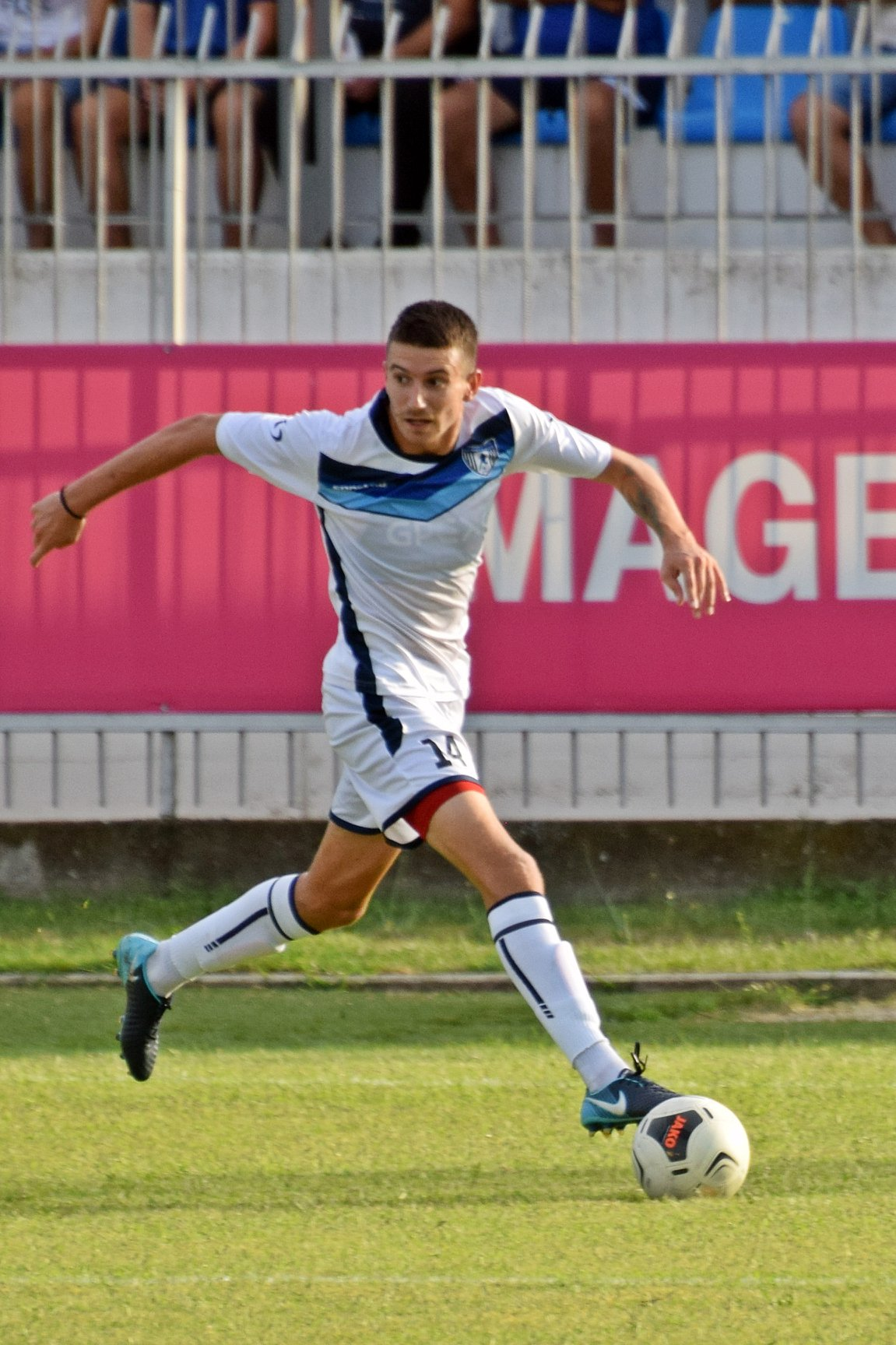

Personal information
- Full name: Ljupcho Doriev; Љупчо Дориев
- Date of birth: 13 September 1995 (age 31)
- Place of birth: Strumica, Rep. Macedonia
- Height: 1.86 m (6 ft 1 in)
- Position: Left winger

Team information
- Current team: Sogdiana
- Number: 14

Youth career
- –2014: Akademija Pandev

Senior career*
Years	Team	Apps	(Gls)
2014–2015	Horizont Turnovo	5	(0)
2015–2020	Akademija Pandev	71	(24)
2020–2023	Iskra	73	(24)
2023–	Sogdiana	78	(39)

International career^{‡}
2017–	North Macedonia	15	(0)
- * Club domestic league appearances and goals as of 29 July 2026 ‡ National team caps and goals as of 14 November 2026

Ljupcho Doriev (Macedonian: Љупчо Дориев; born 13 September 1995) is a Macedonian footballer who plays for Uzbekistan Super League club Sogdiana as a left winger.

== Career ==
=== Club career ===
Ljupcho Doriev started his youth career playing with Akademija Pandev in 2014 after signing his first professional contract with Horizont Turnovo where he played five matches. He then transferred to his youth club Akademija Pandev where he played 71 matches and scored 24 goals between the 2015 and 2020 seasons. After five years with the club he decided to transfer to Shkëndija where he currently plays.

=== International career ===
Doriev made his debut for the Macedonian national team by entering the game in the 77' minute in a 2018 FIFA World Cup qualifier against Liechtenstein, which ended in a 4–0 victory for Macedonia.

=== International ===
As of match played 16 November 2026

Appearances and goals by national team and year
National team	Year	Apps	Goals
North Macedonia	2017	1	0
North Macedonia	2020	2	0
North Macedonia	2022	4	0
North Macedonia	2023	2	0
North Macedonia	2026	6	0
Total		15	0

== Honours ==
  - Akademija Pandev - 2018-19 Macedonian Cup Winner
  - Iskra - 2020-21 Macedonian Champion
