= Železarnica Stadium =

Stadium in North Macedonia

- Interactive map of Železarnica Stadium
- Former names: Metalurg
- Location: Skopje, North Macedonia
- Coordinates: 42°0′24″N 21°27′40″E
- Capacity: 3,000
- Surface: Grass

Tenants
- FK Skopje

Železarnica Stadium is a multi-purpose stadium in Skopje, North Macedonia. It is currently used mostly for football matches and serves as the home ground for former club FK Metalurg Skopje, but Metalurg Skopje was required to play at both the Petar Miloševski Training Centre and Boris Trajkovski Stadium in the Macedonian First League because the Železarnica does not meet the necessary league requirements for First League matches to be held there. Metalurg Skopje was able to continue playing at the Železarnica to start the 2015/16 season in September 2015 until the club fold at the end of 2016–17 Macedonian Second League season. Is also home ground for current club FK Skopje of the Macedonian First League, The stadium capacity holds up to 3,000 spectators.
