= Aleksandar Stavrev =

Macedonian football referee

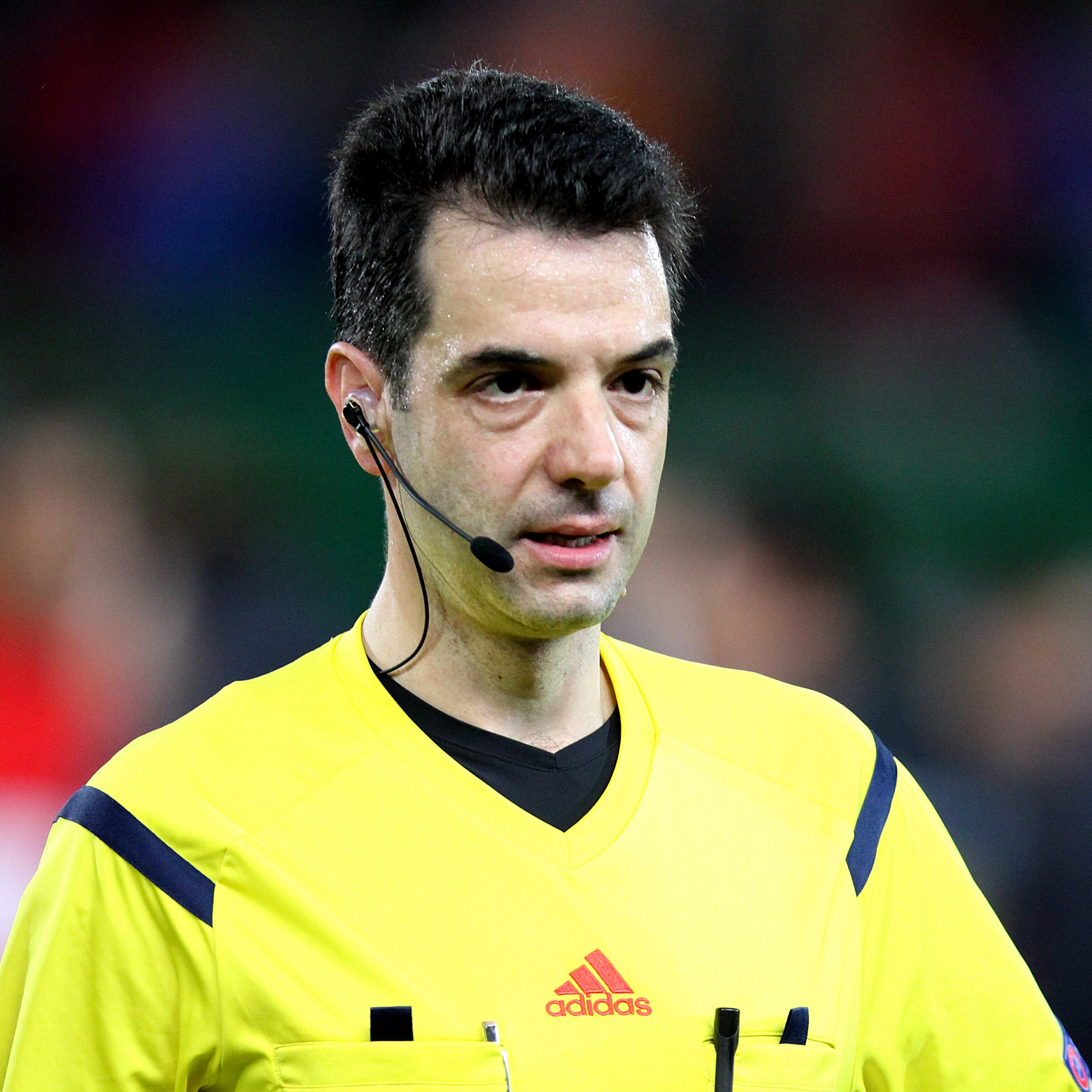
- Born: 30 March 1977 (age 49); Skopje, SFR Yugoslavia

International
Years	League	Role
2006-	FIFA	Referee

Aleksandar Stavrev (Macedonian: Александар Ставрев; born 30 March 1977 in Skopje) is a Macedonian football referee. He refereed at 2012–13 UEFA Champions League.

Stavrev became a FIFA referee in 2006. He has officiated in 2010 and 2014 World Cup qualifiers.
