= Stadion Blagoj Istatov =

Football stadium in Strumica, North Macedonia

Coordinates: 41°26′46.32″N 22°38′15.75″E

Blagoj Istatov Stadium Стадион Благој Истатов
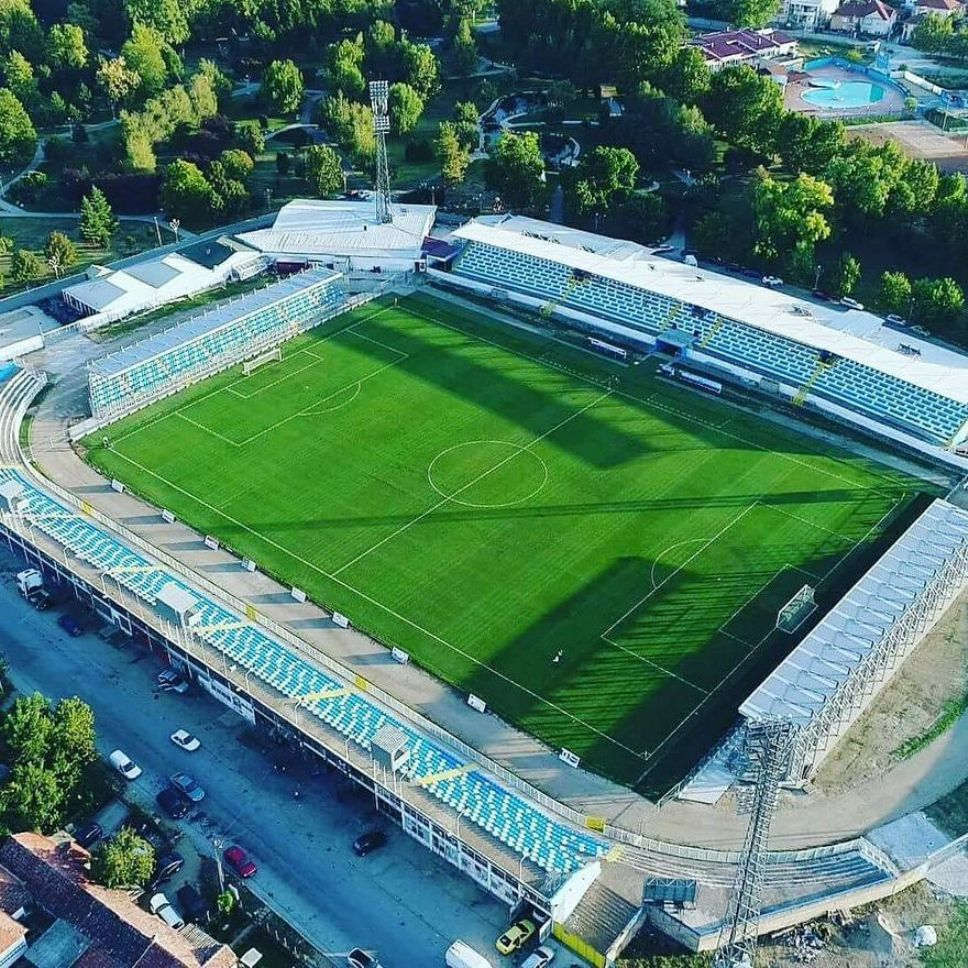
- Interactive map of Blagoj Istatov Stadium; Стадион Благој Истатов
- Former names: Stadion Mladost
- Location: Strumica, North Macedonia
- Owner: FK Belasica
- Capacity: 9,200
- Surface: Grass
- Scoreboard: LED
- Field size: 105 x 68 meters

Construction
- Opened: 1950
- Expanded: 2005, 2017

Tenants
- FK Belasica; FK Brera Strumica; FK Tiverija

Blagoj Istatov Stadium is a football stadium in Strumica, North Macedonia. With the last reconstruction in 2017 the stadium has a capacity of 9,200 seats, and it is a third-class field in accordance with UEFA standards. It meets the conditions for a high-ranking competition and is the second such stadium in the country, after the Toše Proeski Arena in Skopje. It is the home ground of FK Belasica, FK Brera Strumica and FK Tiverija.

== History ==
The stadium was built in 1950 with the original capacity of 6,000.

In 2005, Joseph S. Blatter unveiled a plaque to commemorate the occasion at the Mladost Stadium in Strumica. The Strumica GOAL Project was approved to finance the improvement of the technical centre and stadium. Today the facility boasts several modern training pitches, modern floodlighting, modern dressing rooms and modern conference room underground on Mladost Stadium newly build Stand . FIFA and UEFA gave Mladost Stadium the green light for international games back in 2004.

In September 2015, at the stadium was played the match under the floodlights between FK Belasica and Akademija Pandev in front of 5,000 spectators.

In 2017 the stadium was reconstructed, with the reconstruction including two new covered stands Eastern and Western with a capacity of 1,200 new seating areas, and a complete change of the seats of the south and north stands. New TV Platforms for a complete broadcast of a qualification match in accordance with the requirements of UEFA. New LED panel screen, and upgraded flood lighting.

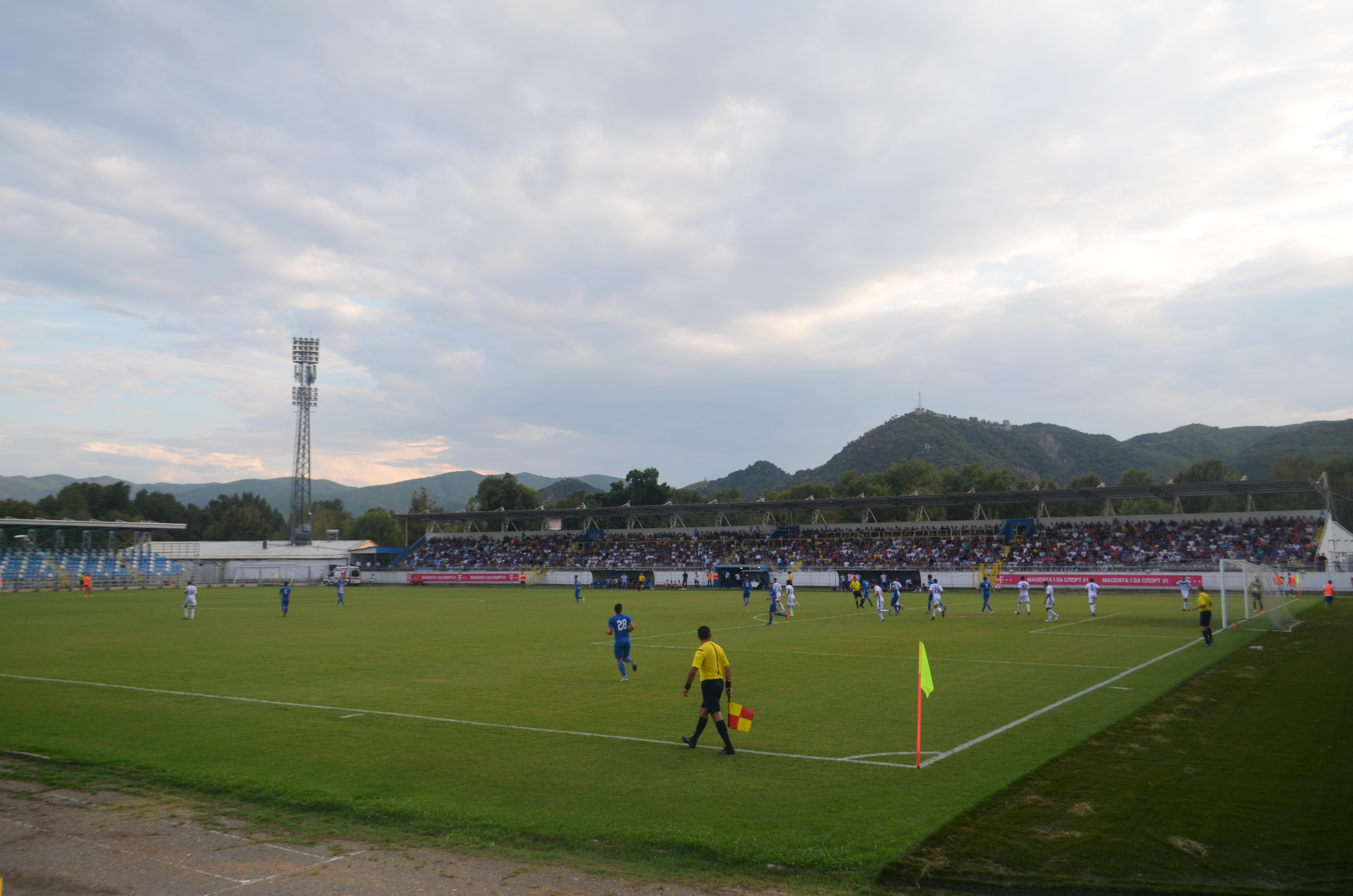

== International fixtures ==
Date	Competition	Opponent	Score	Att.	Ref
North Macedonia (2009–present)
10 February 2009	Friendly	Canada	3–0	3,500	
5 September 2017	2018 FIFA World Cup qualification	Albania	1–1	6,000	
9 October 2017	2018 FIFA World Cup qualification	Liechtenstein	4–0	4,518	
20 October 2023	Friendly	Armenia	3–1	2,075	
