= List of Macedonian football transfers winter 2014–15 =

This is a list of Macedonian football transfers in the winter transfer window 2014–15 by club. Only transfers in Prva Liga are included.

== Prva Liga ==
=== Vardar ===
In:

No.	Pos.	Nation	Player
28	GK	(North Macedonia) MKD	Tome Pachovski (from Mechelen)
9	FW	(North Macedonia) MKD	Dejan Blazhevski (from Khazar Lankaran)
8	MF	(North Macedonia) MKD	Stefan Spirovski (from Beroe Stara Zagora)
21	DF	(North Macedonia) MKD	Stojan Stojchevski (loan return from Horizont Turnovo)
—	MF	(North Macedonia) MKD	Zharko Simjanoski (loan return from Teteks)
17	MF	(Bosnia and Herzegovina) BIH	Senijad Ibričić (on loan from Kayseri Erciyesspor)

Out:

No.	Pos.	Nation	Player
21	DF	(North Macedonia) MKD	Stojan Stojchevski (on loan to Teteks)
20	MF	(North Macedonia) MKD	Andrej Acevski (on loan to Sileks)
—	FW	(North Macedonia) MKD	Vasko Raspashkovski (to Pelister)
—	DF	(North Macedonia) MKD	Viktor Velkoski (to Pelister)
—	MF	(North Macedonia) MKD	Ensar Sulejmani (to Pelister)

=== Rabotnički ===
In:

No.	Pos.	Nation	Player
—	GK	(North Macedonia) MKD	Andreja Efremov (from Metalurg Skopje)
10	FW	(North Macedonia) MKD	Bazhe Ilijoski (from Bangkok Glass)
23	FW	(North Macedonia) MKD	Husein Demiri (loan return from Makedonija GjP)
—	DF	(North Macedonia) MKD	Slobodan Bocevski (loan return from Makedonija GjP)

Out:

No.	Pos.	Nation	Player
10	MF	(North Macedonia) MKD	Tauljant Sulejmanov (to Young Boys)
12	GK	(North Macedonia) MKD	Damjan Shishkovski (on loan to Gent)
—	FW	(North Macedonia) MKD	Erblin Shaqiri (loan return to Shkëndija)
5	DF	(Croatia) CRO	Igor Gal (to Balmazújvárosi)
7	MF	(North Macedonia) MKD	Blazhe Todorovski (to Shkëndija)
21	FW	(North Macedonia) MKD	Aco Stojkov (to Skënderbeu Korçë)
29	MF	(North Macedonia) MKD	Konstantin Cheshmedjiev (to Pelister)
61	FW	(North Macedonia) MKD	Cvetan Churlinov (to Teteks)

=== Shkëndija ===
In:

No.	Pos.	Nation	Player
—	FW	(North Macedonia) MKD	Erblin Shaqiri (loan return from Rabotnički)
11	MF	(North Macedonia) MKD	Besir Demiri (from Shkupi)
33	DF	(North Macedonia) MKD	Mevlan Adili (from Shkupi)
77	MF	(North Macedonia) MKD	Blazhe Todorovski (from Rabotnički)
37	DF	(North Macedonia) MKD	Stefan Ashkovski (on loan from Partizan)
20	MF	(Brazil) BRA	Nildo Victor Juffo (from Rio Branco Atlético Clube)
1	GK	(Switzerland) SUI	Enes Azizi (free)
25	DF	(Montenegro) MNE	Nikola Vukčević (from Lovćen)
17	FW	(Cameroon) CMR	Mohammadou Idrissou (from Maccabi Haifa)
—	FW	(North Macedonia) MKD	Valon Zeqiri (loan return from Gostivar)
30	GK	(Armenia) ARM	Tigran Kandikyan (from Skopje)

Out:

No.	Pos.	Nation	Player
85	DF	(North Macedonia) MKD	Yani Urdinov (to Flamurtari)
24	DF	(Bulgaria) BUL	Martin Kavdanski (to Marek Dupnitsa)
14	FW	(North Macedonia) MKD	Elvir Nurishi (to Gostivar)
—	GK	(North Macedonia) MKD	Besir Nuhii (on loan to Gostivar)
20	DF	(Bosnia and Herzegovina) BIH	Zajko Zeba (to Sloboda Tuzla)
1	GK	(North Macedonia) MKD	Hadis Velii (to Vlazrimi)
—	FW	(North Macedonia) MKD	Erblin Shakjiri (to Renova)

=== Sileks ===
In:

No.	Pos.	Nation	Player
—	MF	(North Macedonia) MKD	Kirche Ristevski (from 11 Oktomvri)
—	MF	(North Macedonia) MKD	Ivan Nasevski (loan return from Kožuf Miravci)
—	FW	(Serbia) SRB	Neven Radaković (from Borac Čačak)
—	FW	(North Macedonia) MKD	Blagojče Glavevski (from Pelister)
—	MF	(North Macedonia) MKD	Andrej Acevski (on loan from Vardar)
—	DF	(North Macedonia) MKD	Lorenco Nikolovski (from Kožuf Miravci)

Out:

No.	Pos.	Nation	Player
—	MF	(North Macedonia) MKD	Stefan Maglovski (to Mladost Carev Dvor)
—	MF	(North Macedonia) MKD	Kristijan Kostovski (to Makedonija GjP)
—	FW	(North Macedonia) MKD	Stojanche Nasevski (released)
18	MF	(Serbia) SRB	Miljan Mijatović (to Ozren)
—	MF	(North Macedonia) MKD	Gjorgje Gligorov (to Horizont Turnovo)

=== Metalurg Skopje ===
In:

No.	Pos.	Nation	Player
—	FW	(North Macedonia) MKD	Antonio Bujchevski (from Renova)
—	GK	(North Macedonia) MKD	Stojan Dimovski (from Horizont Turnovo)

Out:

No.	Pos.	Nation	Player
1	GK	(North Macedonia) MKD	Andreja Efremov (to Rabotnički)
18	FW	(North Macedonia) MKD	Angel Nacev (to Bregalnica)
11	MF	(North Macedonia) MKD	Vasko Mitrov (released)
6	MF	(North Macedonia) MKD	Jordancho Naumovski (released)
25	GK	(North Macedonia) MKD	Aleksandar Igeski (released)
7	FW	(North Macedonia) MKD	Lutfi Bilali (to Pelister)
—	MF	(North Macedonia) MKD	Ivan Ivanovski (to Horizont Turnovo)
—	MF	(North Macedonia) MKD	Ali Redjep (to Kožuf Miravci)

=== Renova ===
In:

No.	Pos.	Nation	Player
—	FW	(Croatia) CRO	Pëllumb Jusufi (from FC Jazz)
—	FW	(North Macedonia) MKD	Erblin Shakjiri (from Shkëndija)
—	FW	(North Macedonia) MKD	Blagojche Markovski (from Pelister)
—	DF	(North Macedonia) MKD	Visar Musliu (loan return from St. Gallen)

Out:

No.	Pos.	Nation	Player
28	MF	(North Macedonia) MKD	Flamur Tairi (to Gostivar)
11	FW	(North Macedonia) MKD	Antonio Bujchevski (to Metalurg Skopje)
6	DF	(North Macedonia) MKD	Ersen Asani (to Shkupi)
26	MF	(North Macedonia) MKD	Florim Abazi (on loan to Drita)

=== Turnovo ===
In:

No.	Pos.	Nation	Player
—	FW	(North Macedonia) MKD	Sashko Dukov (from Vardar Negotino)
—	DF	(North Macedonia) MKD	Gjorgji Markov (from Gostivar)
—	MF	(North Macedonia) MKD	Gjorgi Tanushev (from Kolubara)
—	DF	(North Macedonia) MKD	Kostadin Djinov (from Kožuf Miravci)
—	MF	(North Macedonia) MKD	Ivan Ivanovski (from Metalurg Skopje)
—	MF	(North Macedonia) MKD	Gjorgje Gligorov (from Sileks)
—	DF	(North Macedonia) MKD	Blagoja Spirkovski (from Napredok)

Out:

No.	Pos.	Nation	Player
1	GK	(North Macedonia) MKD	Stojan Dimovski (to Metalurg Skopje)
6	FW	(North Macedonia) MKD	Stojan Stojchevski (loan return to Vardar)
21	DF	(North Macedonia) MKD	Aleksandar Varelovski (released)

=== Pelister ===
In:

No.	Pos.	Nation	Player
—	FW	(North Macedonia) MKD	Vasko Raspashkovski (from Vardar)
—	DF	(North Macedonia) MKD	Viktor Velkoski (from Vardar)
—	MF	(North Macedonia) MKD	Ensar Sulejmani (from Vardar)
—	MF	(Serbia) SRB	Nikola Mitić (from Metalac)
—	FW	(Serbia) SRB	Igor Stanojević (from IM Rakovica)
—	DF	(North Macedonia) MKD	Viktor Talevski (from Bregalnica)
—	FW	(North Macedonia) MKD	Lutfi Bilali (from Metalurg Skopje)
21	MF	(North Macedonia) MKD	Konstantin Cheshmedjiev (from Rabotnički)
—	FW	(Greece) GRE	Georgios Tsirlidis (from Rouvas)
—	GK	(Montenegro) MNE	Miloš Dragojević (from OFK Beograd)
—	FW	(North Macedonia) MKD	Ive Trifunovski (from Kravari)
—	DF	(North Macedonia) MKD	Milorad Smokovski (from Skopje)
—	DF	(North Macedonia) MKD	Tome Rechkoski (from Napredok)
—	FW	(North Macedonia) MKD	Roberto Stajev (free)

Out:

No.	Pos.	Nation	Player
7	DF	(North Macedonia) MKD	Vladica Brdarovski (to Győri)
3	DF	(Bulgaria) BUL	Kiril Dinchev (released)
21	FW	(Bosnia and Herzegovina) BIH	Boško Stupić (to Bregalnica)
16	DF	(North Macedonia) MKD	Goran Gančev (to Semen Padang)
13	MF	(North Macedonia) MKD	Dimche Ristevski (to Mladost Carev Dvor)
18	MF	(North Macedonia) MKD	Dejan Velevski (to Mladost Carev Dvor)
4	MF	(North Macedonia) MKD	Goce Todorovski (released)
14	DF	(North Macedonia) MKD	Toni Maglovski (to Mladost Carev Dvor)
—	FW	(North Macedonia) MKD	Blagojche Glavevski (to Sileks)
11	FW	(North Macedonia) MKD	Blagojche Markovski (to Renova)
12	GK	(North Macedonia) MKD	Dejan Apostolovski (to Pobeda)

=== Bregalnica ===
In:

No.	Pos.	Nation	Player
—	FW	(North Macedonia) MKD	Angel Nacev (from Metalurg Skopje)
—	FW	(North Macedonia) MKD	Lazar Iliev (from Vlazrimi)
—	DF	(Serbia) SRB	Zvonimir Stanković (from Dinamo Vranje)
—	FW	(Bosnia and Herzegovina) BIH	Boško Stupić (from Pelister)
—	DF	(North Macedonia) MKD	Nikola Tonev (free)

Out:

No.	Pos.	Nation	Player
10	MF	(North Macedonia) MKD	Riste Markovski (to Vlazrimi)
23	MF	(Serbia) SRB	Zoran Matić (released)
9	FW	(Serbia) SRB	Milan Jovanović (released)
4	MF	(Serbia) SRB	Nemanja Stošković (released)
—	DF	(North Macedonia) MKD	Viktor Talevski (to Pelister)
6	DF	(North Macedonia) MKD	Sashko Ristov (to Gorno Lisiče)

=== Teteks ===
In:

No.	Pos.	Nation	Player
1	GK	(North Macedonia) MKD	Dushan Pavlov (from Madžari Solidarnost)
17	DF	(North Macedonia) MKD	Jovan Pop Zlatanov (from Madžari Solidarnost)
16	DF	(North Macedonia) MKD	David Atanaskoski (from Madžari Solidarnost)
8	MF	(North Macedonia) MKD	Kristijan Filipovski (from Madžari Solidarnost)
15	MF	(North Macedonia) MKD	Ergin Osmani (from Madžari Solidarnost)
18	FW	(North Macedonia) MKD	Darko Murdjeski (from Madžari Solidarnost)
—	MF	(North Macedonia) MKD	Andrej Jovanovski (from Madžari Solidarnost)
9	FW	(North Macedonia) MKD	Cvetan Churlinov (from Rabotnički)
3	DF	(Russia) RUS	Vladislav Oslonovskiy (from Istra 1961)
—	MF	(North Macedonia) MKD	Filip Krstevski (from Metalurg Skopje)
6	MF	(North Macedonia) MKD	Tihomir Kostadinov (from Moravac Orion)
—	DF	(North Macedonia) MKD	Stojan Stojchevski (on loan from Vardar)
—	FW	(Russia) RUS	Vasili Pavlov (from Khimki)

Out:

No.	Pos.	Nation	Player
21	FW	(Brazil) BRA	Jayme da Silva (released)
—	FW	(Brazil) BRA	Nandinho (released)
8	MF	(North Macedonia) MKD	Zharko Simjanoski (loan return to Vardar)
11	MF	(North Macedonia) MKD	Milan Ristovski (to Gostivar)
4	MF	(North Macedonia) MKD	Martin Blazhevski (to Gostivar)
—	DF	(North Macedonia) MKD	Goran Bogdanovikj (released)
3	DF	(North Macedonia) MKD	Emir Adem (released)
17	FW	(United States) USA	Muhamet Ajvazi (to Vlazrimi)

== See also ==
- 2014–15 Macedonian First Football League
