= 2015–16 Macedonian First Football League =

Macedonian First League
- Season: 2015–16
- Dates: 9 August 2015 – 19 May 2016
- Champions: Vardar; 9th Macedonian title 10th domestic title
- Relegated: Metalurg; Mladost; Horizont Turnovo
- Champions League: Vardar
- Europa League: Shkëndija; Rabotnichki; Sileks
- Matches: 162
- Goals: 426 (2.63 per match)
- Top goalscorer: Besart Ibraimi (26 goals)
- Biggest home win: Vardar 6–0 Mladost (23 August 2015)
- Biggest away win: Mladost 0–5 Bregalnica (3 April 2016)
- Highest scoring: Renova 5–2 Horizont Turnovo (18 October 2015)
- Longest winning run: 9 games Shkendija
- Longest unbeaten run: 15 games Rabotnichki
- Longest winless run: 11 games Mladost
- Longest losing run: 10 games Mladost

The 2015–16 Macedonian First League was the 24th season of the Macedonian First Football League, the highest football league of Macedonia. It began on 9 August 2015 and ended on 19 May 2016. It was the last season as the format changed from the 2016–17 season which will each team be played the other sides four times on home-away basis, for a total of 36 matches each instead of play-off and play-out after 27th round.

The league was contested by 10 teams. Vardar are the defending champions, having won their eight title in 2014–15.

== Promotion and relegation ==
At the start of the 2015–16 season

Promoted from 2014–15 Second League

- Shkupi (winners)
- Mladost Carev Dvor (runners-up)

Relegated to 2015–16 Second League

- Pelister (9th)
- Teteks (10th)

At the end of the 2015–16 season

Promoted from 2015–16 Second League

- Pobeda (winners)
- Makedonija G.P. (runners-up)
- Pelister (3rd; won play-off)

Relegated to 2016–17 Second League

- Horizont Turnovo (8th; lost play-off)
- Metalurg Skopje (9th)
- Mladost Carev Dvor (10th)^{1}

^{1} Mladost Carev Dvor was declined their participation from the Second League due to financial problems.

== Participating teams ==
Location of teams in 2015–16 Macedonian First League

Club	City	Stadium	Capacity
Bregalnica	Shtip	Gradski stadion Shtip	4,000
Metalurg	Skopje	Stadion Zhelezarnica	3,000
Mladost	Carev Dvor	SRC Biljanini Izvori	2,500
Rabotnichki	Skopje	Philip II Arena	33,460
Renova	Djepchishte	City Stadium Tetovo	15,000
Shkëndija	Tetovo	City Stadium Tetovo	15,000
Shkupi	Skopje	Chair Stadium	6,000
Sileks	Kratovo	Stadion Sileks	1,800
Horizont Turnovo	Turnovo	Stadion Kukush	1,500
Vardar	Skopje	Philip II Arena	33,460

=== Personnel and kits ===
Note: Flags indicate national team as has been defined under FIFA eligibility rules. Players may hold more than one non-FIFA nationality.

Team	Manager	Captain	Kit manufacturer	Shirt sponsor
Bregalnica	(North Macedonia) Igor Stojanov	(North Macedonia) Goran Zdravkov	Derbystar	Quehenberger
Metalurg	(North Macedonia) Alekso Mackov	(North Macedonia) Mile Krstev	Macron	Makstil
Mladost	(North Macedonia) Zdravko Cvetanoski	(North Macedonia) Aleksandar Ristevski	Legea	
Rabotnichki	(North Macedonia) Tomislav Franc	(North Macedonia) Bazhe Ilijoski	Zeus	
Renova	(North Macedonia) Qatip Osmani	(North Macedonia) Fisnik Nuhi	Jako	Renova
Shkendija	(Bosnia and Herzegovina) Bruno Akrapović	(North Macedonia) Ferhan Hasani	Nike	Ecolog
Shkupi	(North Macedonia) Visar Ganiu	(North Macedonia) Suat Zendeli	Lotto	Čair Municipality
Sileks	(North Macedonia) Momchilo Mitevski	(North Macedonia) Nikolcho Georgiev	Legea	
Horizont Turnovo	(North Macedonia) Jane Nikolovski	(North Macedonia) Sashko Pandev	Jako	Vitaminka
Vardar	(North Macedonia) Goce Sedloski	(North Macedonia) Boban Grncharov	Hummel	Zdravje

== Regular season ==
The first 27 Rounds comprise the first phase of the season, also called the Regular season. In the first phase, every team plays against each other team twice on a home-away basis till all the teams have played two matches against each other. The table standings at the end of the Regular season determine the group in which each team is going to play in the Play-offs.

=== League table ===
Pos	Team	Pld	W	D	L	GF	GA	GD	Pts	Qualification
1	Vardar	27	20	5	2	59	15	+44	65	Qualification for the championship round
2	Shkëndija	27	19	6	2	62	21	+41	63	Qualification for the championship round
3	Sileks	27	11	7	9	32	32	0	40	Qualification for the championship round
4	Shkupi	27	9	11	7	28	25	+3	38	Qualification for the championship round
5	Rabotnichki	27	8	12	7	32	26	+6	36	Qualification for the championship round
6	Bregalnica Shtip	27	9	6	12	38	43	−5	33	Qualification for the championship round
7	Horizont Turnovo	27	8	9	10	32	42	−10	33	Qualification for the relegation round
8	Renova	27	8	7	12	33	37	−4	31	Qualification for the relegation round
9	Metalurg	27	4	4	19	20	48	−28	16	Qualification for the relegation round
10	Mladost Carev Dvor	27	5	1	21	18	65	−47	16	Qualification for the relegation round

Source: MacedonianFootball.com, Soccerway
Rules for classification: 1) Points; 2) Goal difference; 3) Goals scored; 4) Head-to-head points; 5) Head-to-head goal difference; 6) Head-to-head away goals scored (only if two teams); 7) Head-to-head goals scored; 8) Draw; 9) Play-off. (Note: Criteria 2, 3 and 8 is only used if not deciding teams for championship or relegation round).

=== Results ===
Home \ Away	BRE	MET	MLA	RAB	REN	SKE	SHK	SIL	TUR	VAR	BRE	MET	MLA	RAB	REN	SKE	SHK	SIL	TUR	VAR
Bregalnica Shtip	—	0–2	2–3	1–0	3–2	0–2	1–2	1–1	3–0	0–2	—	4–1	—	2–1	—	0–3	—	—	2–0	—
Metalurg	0–3	—	1–2	0–0	1–0	0–3	0–1	1–3	2–2	0–1	—	—	2–0	1–2	—	0–4	—	—	0–1	—
Mladost Carev Dvor	1–4	1–5	—	0–3	2–1	1–1	0–2	3–1	2–1	0–1	0–5	—	—	—	—	—	0–1	0–1	—	0–3
Rabotnichki	0–0	2–0	2–0	—	1–1	2–4	1–1	2–0	4–2	1–1	—	—	2–1	—	0–0	0–1	1–1	—	2–0	—
Renova	1–1	2–0	1–0	3–1	—	0–0	1–1	2–1	5–2	0–0	3–0	4–1	3–0	—	—	—	—	—	1–1	—
Shkëndija	5–1	2–0	3–1	1–1	3–1	—	4–1	3–1	2–2	1–3	—	—	2–0	—	3–1	—	3–1	3–1	2–0	—
Shkupi	0–0	0–0	5–0	1–1	3–0	0–2	—	0–0	1–1	0–3	2–2	1–0	—	—	1–0	—	—	1–0	—	0–1
Sileks	1–0	3–1	3–0	0–0	1–0	3–1	1–0	—	1–1	0–3	2–2	3–0	—	0–0	1–0	—	—	—	—	3–1
Horizont Turnovo	2–0	1–1	1–0	2–2	4–0	0–3	0–0	0–0	—	2–1	—	—	3–1	—	—	—	1–0	2–1	—	0–1
Vardar	3–1	1–0	6–0	2–1	2–0	0–0	2–2	4–0	5–1	—	4–0	2–1	—	1–0	4–1	1–1	—	—	—	—

Source: MacedonianFootball.com
Legend: Blue = home team win; Yellow = draw; Red = away team win.

== Second phase ==
The second phase are the so-called Play-off Rounds which is divided in two groups: Championship and Relegation. The top 6 ranked teams on the table after the Regular Season qualify for the Championship group, while the bottom 4 advance to the Relegation group.

=== Championship round ===
In the Championship round, each team plays against every other one only once, making 5 games in total. Records from the first phase are carried over. Teams play each other once with each team playing five games in this round.

==== Table ====
Pos	Team	Pld	W	D	L	GF	GA	GD	Pts	Qualification
1	Vardar (C)	32	25	5	2	67	17	+50	80	Qualification for the Champions League second qualifying round
2	Shkëndija	32	23	6	3	74	24	+50	75	Qualification for the Europa League first qualifying round (Note: Shkëndija qualified for the Europa League first qualifying round by winning the 2015–16 Macedonian Football Cup.)
3	Sileks	32	12	8	12	35	40	−5	44	Qualification for the Europa League first qualifying round
4	Rabotnichki	32	10	13	9	36	30	+6	43	Qualification for the Europa League first qualifying round
5	Bregalnica Shtip	32	10	8	14	42	49	−7	38	
6	Shkupi	32	9	11	12	29	34	−5	38	

Source: MacedonianFootball.com, Soccerway
Rules for classification: 1) Points; 2) Goal difference; 3) Goals scored; 4) Head-to-head points; 5) Head-to-head goal difference; 6) Head-to-head away goals scored (only if two teams); 7) Head-to-head goals scored; 8) Draw; 9) Play-off. (Note: Criteria 2, 3 and 8 is only used if not deciding Champion or teams for UEFA competitions).
(C) Champions

==== Results ====
Home \ Away	BRE	RAB	SKE	SHK	SIL	VAR
Bregalnica Shtip	—	0–0	—	2–0	—	—
Rabotnichki	—	—	—	—	2–0	0–1
Shkëndija	3–0	3–1	—	—	3–0	—
Shkupi	—	0–1	1–3	—	—	—
Sileks	1–1	—	—	1–0	—	1–2
Vardar	2–1	—	1–0	2–0	—	—

Source: MacedonianFootball.com
Legend: Blue = home team win; Yellow = draw; Red = away team win.

=== Relegation round ===
In the Relegation round, each team plays twice against every opponent on a home-away basis. Records from the first phase are carried over. Teams play each other twice with each team playing six games in this round.

==== Table ====
Pos	Team	Pld	W	D	L	GF	GA	GD	Pts	Relegation
7	Renova	33	13	8	12	49	42	+7	47	
8	Horizont Turnovo (R)	33	12	10	11	45	43	+2	46	Qualification for the relegation play-offs
9	Metalurg (R)	33	5	4	24	27	66	−39	19	Relegation to the Macedonian Second League
10	Mladost Carev Dvor (R)	33	6	1	26	22	81	−59	19	Relegation to the Macedonian Second League

Source: MacedonianFootball.com, Soccerway
Rules for classification: 1) Points; 2) Goal difference; 3) Goals scored; 4) Head-to-head points; 5) Head-to-head goal difference; 6) Head-to-head away goals scored (only if two teams); 7) Head-to-head goals scored; 8) Draw; 9) Play-off. (Note: Criteria 2, 3 and 8 is only used if not deciding teams for relegation).
(R) Relegated

==== Results ====
Home \ Away	MET	MLA	REN	TUR
Metalurg	—	4–0	2–4	0–4
Mladost Carev Dvor	2–0	—	0–4	0–2
Renova	3–1	4–2	—	1–0
Horizont Turnovo	5–0	2–0	0–0	—

Source: MacedonianFootball.com
Legend: Blue = home team win; Yellow = draw; Red = away team win.

== Relegation play-offs ==
=== First leg ===
25 May 2016
16:00 CEST

Horizont Turnovo	1–2	Pelister
Pandev 4'	Report	Markovski 23' (pen.), 29' (pen.)

Stadion Gjorche Petrov, Skopje
Attendance: 400
Referee: Josip Barton (Tetovo)

=== Second leg ===
29 May 2016
16:00 CEST

Pelister	1–0	Horizont Turnovo
Cvetanoski 62'	Report

Stadion Gjorche Petrov, Skopje
Attendance: 800
Referee: Aleksandar Stavrev (Skopje)

Pelister won 3–1 on aggregate.

== Season statistics ==
=== Top scorers ===
As of 19 May 2016

Rank	Player	Club	Goals
1	(North Macedonia) Besart Ibraimi	Shkëndija	26
2	(North Macedonia) Sashko Pandev	Horizont Turnovo	16
3	(North Macedonia) Blazhe Ilijoski	Rabotnichki	13
4	(North Macedonia) Ferhan Hasani	Shkëndija	12
5	(Serbia) Igor Nedeljković	Sileks	11
6	(North Macedonia) Dejan Blazhevski	Vardar	9
6	(North Macedonia) Armend Alimi	Shkëndija	9
6	(North Macedonia) Argjent Gafuri	Renova	9
6	(North Macedonia) Marjan Radeski	Shkëndija	9
10	(North Macedonia) Angel Nacev	Bregalnica	8
10	(North Macedonia) Argjent Gafuri	Renova	8

Source: MacedonianFootball

== See also ==
- 2015–16 Macedonian Football Cup
- 2015–16 Macedonian Second Football League
- 2015–16 Macedonian Third Football League
