= 2014–15 Macedonian Football Cup =

Tournament details
- Country: Macedonia
- Dates: 20 August 2014 – 20 May 2015
- Teams: 29

Final positions
- Champions: Rabotnichki (4th title)
- Runners-up: Teteks

Tournament statistics
- Matches played: 41
- Goals scored: 127 (3.1 per match)

The 2014–15 Macedonian Football Cup was the 23rd season of Macedonia's football knockout competition. Rabotnichki are the defending champions, having won their third title in the previous year.

== Competition calendar ==
Round	Date(s)	Fixtures	Clubs	New entries
First Round	19, 20, 21 August 2014	13	29 → 16	29
Second Round	24 September & 14 October 2014	16	16 → 8	3
Quarter-finals	18 November & 4, 6 December 2014	8	8 → 4	none
Semi-finals	18 March & 15 April 2015	4	4 → 2	none
Final	20 May 2015	1	2 → 1	none

== First round ==
Matches were played on 19, 20 and 21 August 2014.

Team 1	Score	Team 2
19 August 2014
11 Oktomvri (3)	0–9	Shkupi (2)
20 August 2014
Fortuna (3)	0–8	Horizont Turnovo (1)
Rabotnik Djumajlija (3)	0–3 (w/o)	Sileks (1)
Kozhuf Miravci (2)	2–1	Makedonija G.P. (2)
Goblen (3)	0–3	Teteks (1)
Novaci 2005 (3)	0–5	Gostivar (2)
Bregalnica Golak (3)	1–4	Drita (2)
Belasica (3)	1–1 (2–4 p)	Napredok (2)
Sasa (3)	0–2	Renova (1)
Vlaznimi (3)	1–9	Vardar (1)
Mladost Carev Dvor (2)	0–1	Bregalnica Shtip (1)
Pobeda Junior (3)	3–2	Metalurg (1)
21 August 2014
Vulkan (3)	0–2	Pelister (1)
N/A
Gorno Lisiche (2)	bye	
Rabotnichki (1)	bye	
Shkëndija (1)	bye	

== Second round ==
Entering this round are the 16 winners from the first round. The first legs took place on 24 September and the second legs took place on 14 October 2014.

Team 1	Agg.	Team 2	1st leg	2nd leg
Shkëndija (1)	2–4	Vardar (1)	2–1	0–3
Gostivar (2)	1–5	Renova (1)	1–4	0–1
Pelister (1)	1–3	Rabotnichki (1)	0–0	1–3
Sileks (1)	1–1 (a)	Gorno Lisiche (2)	1–1	0–0
Pobeda Junior (3)	2–2 (1–3 p)	Drita (2)	1–1	1–1
Horizont Turnovo (1)	0–0 (4–3 p)	Bregalnica Shtip (1)	0–0	0–0
Shkupi (2)	1–2	Teteks (1)	1–1	0–1
Kozhuf Miravci (2)	5–1	Napredok (2)	0–0	5–1

== Quarter-finals ==
Entering this round are the 8 winners from the second round. The first legs took place on 18 and 26 November and the second legs took place on 4 and 6 December 2014.

=== Summary ===
Team 1	Agg.	Team 2	1st leg	2nd leg
Vardar (1)	3–3 (a)	Renova (1)	3–1	0–2
Gorno Lisiche (2)	4–5	Rabotnichki (1)	3–2	1–3
Kozhuf Miravci (2)	1–5	Teteks (1)	1–0	0–5
Horizont Turnovo (1)	6–0	Drita (2)	5–0	1–0

=== Matches ===
18 November 2014
13:00 CET

Vardar (1)	3–1	Renova (1)
Asani 41'; Petrov 71'; Temelkov 87'		Jusufi 29'

Philip II Arena, Skopje
Referee: Dimitar Mechkarovski (Skopje)
6 December 2014
13:00 CET

Renova (1)	2–0	Vardar (1)
Emini 71'; Mecinovikj 85'

Gradski stadion, Tetovo
Referee: Stevche Shulevski (Ohrid)

3–3 on aggregate. Renova won on away goals.

26 November 2014
13:00 CET

Gorno Lisiche (2)	3–2	Rabotnichki (1)
Jasharoski 45' (pen.); Pandovski 78'; Jovanovski 90+1'		Stojkov 6', 37'

Stadion Boris Trajkovski, Skopje
Referee: Aleksandar Stavrev (Skopje)
6 December 2014
13:00 CET

Rabotnichki (1)	3–1	Gorno Lisiche (2)
Stojkov 59'; Churlinov 63'; Altiparmakovski 74'		Mojsovski 76'

Philip II Arena, Skopje
Referee: Aleksandar Stavrev (Skopje)

Rabotnichki won 5–4 on aggregate.

18 November 2014
13:00 CET

Kozhuf Miravci (2)	1–0	Teteks (1)
Ilievski 63'

Stadion Miravci, Miravci
Referee: Zorancho Temelkov (Kavadarci)
4 December 2014
13:00 CET

Teteks (1)	5–0	Kozhuf Miravci (2)
Drobarov 20'; M. Hristov 50', 73'; Cvetkovski 66' (o.g.); S. Hristov 67'

Gradski stadion, Tetovo
Referee: Konstantin Vlaho (Ohrid)

Teteks won 5–1 on aggregate.

18 November 2014
13:00 CET

Horizont Turnovo (1)	5–0	Drita (2)
Najdenov 43'; Dolapchiev 45+1', 70', 71'; Iliev 75'

Stadion Kukush, Turnovo
Referee: Simeon Stevkov (Skopje)
4 December 2014
13:00 CET

Drita (1)	0–1	Horizont Turnovo (1)
		Dolapchiev 60'

Stadion Bogovinje, Bogovinje
Referee: Marjan Gocevski (Strumica)

Horizont Turnovo won 6–0 on aggregate.

== Semi-finals ==
Entering this round are the 4 winners from the quarterfinals. The first legs were played on 18 March and the second legs were played on 15 April 2015.

=== Summary ===
Team 1	Agg.	Team 2	1st leg	2nd leg
Rabotnichki (1)	3–2	Renova (1)	2–1	1–1
Teteks (1)	3–3 (4–2 p)	Horizont Turnovo (1)	2–1	1–2

=== Matches ===
18 March 2015
14:00 CET

Rabotnichki (1)	2–1	Renova (1)
Vujčić 33' (pen.); Altiparmakovski 54'		Emini 65'

Philip II Arena, Skopje
Attendance: 200
Referee: Dimitar Mechkarovski (Skopje)
15 April 2015
16:00 CEST

Renova (1)	1–1	Rabotnichki (1)
Gafuri 86'		Markoski 70'

Gradski stadion, Tetovo
Attendance: 1,000
Referee: Dimitar Mechkarovski (Skopje)

Rabotnichki won 3–2 on aggregate.

18 March 2015
14:00 CET

Teteks (1)	2–1	Horizont Turnovo (1)
Jovanoski 42', 47'		Mutafchiyski 65'

Stadion Boris Trajkovski, Skopje
Attendance: 300
Referee: Aleksandar Stavrev (Skopje)
15 April 2015
16:00 CEST

Horizont Turnovo (1)	2–1	Teteks (1)
Georgiev 64'; Najdenov 89'		Churlinov 10'
Penalties
	2–4

Stadion Kukush, Turnovo
Attendance: 800
Referee: Aleksandar Stavrev (Skopje)

3–3 on aggregate. Teteks won 4–2 in penalty shootout.

== Final ==
20 May 2015
20:00 CEST

Rabotnichki (1)	2–1	Teteks (1)
Ilijoski 68'; Altiparmakovski 72'	Report	Churlinov 45'

Philip II Arena, Skopje
Attendance: 3,800
Referee: Dejan Jakimovski (Skopje)

== Season statistics ==
=== Top scorers ===
As of 20 May 2015

Rank	Player	Club	Goals
1	(Bulgaria) Grigor Dolapchiev	Horizont Turnovo	6
2	(North Macedonia) Martin Hristov	Teteks	5
5	(North Macedonia) Filip Petkovski	Vardar	4
5	(North Macedonia) Filip Petrov	Vardar	4
5	(North Macedonia) Izair Emini	Renova	4
5	(North Macedonia) Marjan Altiparmakovski	Rabotnichki	4
5	(North Macedonia) Aco Stojkov	Rabotnichki	4
5	(North Macedonia) Bojan Najdenov	Horizont Turnovo	4
8	(North Macedonia) Dragan Gjorgiev	Horizont Turnovo	3
8	(North Macedonia) Erkan Seferi	Shkupi	3
8	(North Macedonia) Cvetan Churlinov	Teteks	3

== See also ==
- 2014–15 Macedonian First Football League
- 2014–15 Macedonian Second Football League
- 2014–15 Macedonian Third Football League
