= 2013–14 FK Horizont Turnovo season =

Horizont Turnovo
2013–14 season
- Chairman: Orce Todorov
- Manager: Ali Güneş; Goce Sedloski
- Stadium: Stadion Kukuš
- First League: 2nd
- Macedonian Cup: Second Round
- UEFA Europa League: Second qualifying round
- Top goalscorer: League: Dejan Blaževski (19); All: Baldovaliev, Blaževski (6)
- Highest home attendance: 3,000 vs Vardar; 25 August 2013
- Lowest home attendance: 500 vs Napredok; 11 August 2013
Home colours	Away colours

The 2013–14 season is FK Turnovo's 6th consecutive season in First League. This article shows player statistics and all official matches that the club will play during the 2013–14 season.

== Squad ==
As of 10 February 2014

Note: Flags indicate national team as defined under FIFA eligibility rules; some limited exceptions apply. Players may hold more than one non-FIFA nationality.

No.	Pos.	Nation	Player
1	GK	MKD	Stojan Dimovski (captain)
12	GK	MKD	Atanas Jovanov
TBA	GK	MKD	Darko Ristevski
3	DF	MKD	Tome Iliev
4	DF	MKD	Tomica Petrov
5	DF	BUL	Radko Mutafchiyski
6	DF	MKD	Dejan Mitrev
21	DF	MKD	Aleksandar Varelovski
25	DF	MKD	Stefan Ristevski
28	DF	MKD	Petar Mitev
2	MF	MKD	Marjan Tasev
7	MF	MKD	Mitko Mavrov
8	MF	MKD	Aleksandar Tenekedžiev

No.	Pos.	Nation	Player
17	MF	SRB	Milan Svojić
18	MF	MKD	Iljo Mitrov
19	MF	MKD	Gjorgji Stoilov
20	MF	MKD	Todi Vasilev
23	MF	MKD	Filip Naumčevski
22	MF	MKD	Bojan Najdenov
9	FW	MKD	Muzafer Ejupi
10	FW	BUL	Georgi Kakalov
11	FW	MKD	Daniel Kovačev
14	FW	MKD	Martin Aleksov
18	FW	MKD	Cvetan Čurlinov
20	FW	MKD	Dejan Cvetanoski
26	FW	MKD	Saško Pandev

=== Left club during season ===
Note: Flags indicate national team as defined under FIFA eligibility rules; some limited exceptions apply. Players may hold more than one non-FIFA nationality.

No.	Pos.	Nation	Player
10	MF	MKD	Dejan Blaževski (to Khazar Lankaran)
15	MF	MKD	Alen Jašaroski (on loan to FK Gorno Lisiče)

No.	Pos.	Nation	Player
26	FW	MKD	Zoran Baldovaliev (to PAE Kerkyra)

== Competitions ==
=== First League ===
==== Results summary ====
Overall								Home						Away					
Pld	W	D	L	GF	GA	GD	Pts	W	D	L	GF	GA	GD	W	D	L	GF	GA	GD
31	17	6	8	59	31	+28	57	11	3	2	38	10	+28	6	3	6	21	21	0

==== Results by round ====
Round	1	2	3	4	5	6	7	8	9	10	11	12	13	14	15	16	17	18	19	20	21	22	23	24	25	26	27	28	29	30	31	32	33
Ground	A	H	A	H	A	H	A	A	H	A	H	H	A	H	A	H	A	H	H	A	H	A	H	A	H	A	H	A	H	A	H	A	H
Result	W	W	D	W	W	D	L	L	W	L	W	W	D	L	D	L	W	W	W	L	L	W	W	L	L	W	W	W	D	W	W		
Position	2	1	1	1	1	1	5	6	4	7	3	2	2	5	5	5	3	2	1	2	2	1	1	2	4	4	3	2	3	2	2		

Updated to match(es) played on 4 May 2014. Source: Competitive Matches
A = Away; H = Home; W = Win; D = Draw; L = Loss

==== Results ====
4 August 2013 1	Shkëndija	0 – 3	Horizont Turnovo	Tetovo
18:00		Summary	Baldovaliev 65', 86'; Blaževski 76' (pen.)	Stadium: Gradski stadion Attendance: 6,000; Referee: Goran Spirkoski (Prilep)

11 August 2013 2	Horizont Turnovo	4 – 0	Napredok	Turnovo
17:30	Baldovaliev 45' (pen.), 48', 90+2'; Naumčevski 78'	Summary		Stadium: Stadion Kukuš; Attendance: 500; Referee: Marjan Eckoski (Ohrid)

18 August 2013 3	Pelister	0 – 0	Horizont Turnovo	Bitola
17:30	Kitanovski (yellow card) 61' (red card); Dragarski (yellow card) 71' (red card)	Summary	Mitrev (yellow card) 87' (red card)	Stadium: Tumbe Kafe; Attendance: 4,000; Referee: Dimitar Mečkarovski (Skopje)

25 August 2013 4	Horizont Turnovo	2 – 0	Vardar	Turnovo
17:00	Naumčevski 62'; Blaževski 66'	Report		Stadium: Stadion Kukuš; Attendance: 3,000; Referee: Aleksandar Stavrev (Skopje)

28 August 2013 5	Makedonija GjP	2 – 1	Horizont Turnovo	Skopje
17:00	Adem 37'; Kolekjeski 51'	Report	T. Petrov 47'	Stadium: Stadion Gjorče Petrov; Attendance: 500; Referee: Zorančo Temelkov (Kavadarci)

1 September 2013 6	Horizont Turnovo	1 – 1	Euromilk	Turnovo
16:30	Blaževski 25'		Kostencoski 47'	Stadium: Stadion Kukuš; Referee: Faton Mustafi (Tetovo)

==== Table ====
Pos	Team	Pld	W	D	L	GF	GA	GD	Pts	Qualification or relegation
1	Rabotnichki (C)	33	18	8	7	66	35	+31	62	Qualification to Champions League second qualifying round
2	Horizont Turnovo	33	18	6	9	61	33	+28	60	Qualification to Europa League first qualifying round (Note: Metalurg qualified for the Europa League first qualifying round as a runner-up of the 2013–14 Macedonian Football Cup.)
3	Metalurg	33	16	11	6	48	29	+19	59	Qualification to Europa League first qualifying round
4	Shkëndija	33	16	9	8	53	32	+21	57	Qualification to Europa League first qualifying round
5	Vardar	33	15	11	7	55	32	+23	56	

Source: MacedonianFootball.com
Rules for classification: 1) Points; 2) Goal difference; 3) Goals scored; 4) Head-to-head points; 5) Head-to-head goal difference; 6) Head-to-head away goals scored (only if two teams); 7) Head-to-head goals scored; 8) Draw; 9) Play-off. (Note: Criteria 2, 3 and 8 is only used if not deciding Champion, teams for UEFA competitions or relegation).
(C) Champions

=== Macedonian Cup ===
==== First round ====
21 August 2013	Belasica	0 – 4	Horizont Turnovo	Strumica
17:00		Report	Ejupi; Pandev; Vasilev	Stadium: Stadion Mladost; Referee: Marjan Gocevski (Strumica)

==== Second round ====
18 September 2013 First leg	Horizont Turnovo	–	Bregalnica Štip	Turnovo
				Stadium: Stadion Kukuš

25 September 2013 Second leg	Bregalnica Štip	– (– agg.)	Horizont Turnovo	Štip
				Stadium: Gradski stadion

=== Europa League ===
==== First qualifying round ====
4 July 2013 First leg	Sūduva Marijampolė (Lithuania)	2 – 2	(North Macedonia) Turnovo	Marijampolė
18:45 EEST	Bašić 23'; Valskis 85'	Report	Baldovaliev 30'; Blaževski 45+1' (pen.)	Stadium: ARVI Football Arena; Attendance: 1,500; Referee: Jari Järvinen (Finland)

11 July 2013 Second leg	Turnovo (North Macedonia)	2 – 2 (a.e.t.) (4 – 4 agg.) (5–4 p)	(Lithuania) Sūduva Marijampolė	Skopje
17:30 CEST	Mitrov 47'; Blaževski 90+7' (pen.)	Report	Valskis 43'; Radzinevičius 52'	Stadium: Philip II Arena; Attendance: 1,558; Referee: Clayton Pisani (Malta)
	Penalties
	Baldovaliev (penalty scored); Blaževski (penalty scored); Najdenov (penalty scored); Tasev (penalty missed); Mavrov (penalty scored); Stoilov (penalty scored)		(penalty scored) Bašić; (penalty missed) Urba; (penalty scored) Šoblinskas; (penalty scored) Brokas; (penalty scored) Uggè; (penalty missed) Leimonas

==== Second qualifying round ====
18 July 2013 First leg	Hajduk Split (Croatia)	2 – 1	(North Macedonia) Turnovo	Split
20:30 CEST	Bencun 8'; Maloča 79'	Report	Blaževski 45+1' (pen.)	Stadium: Stadion Poljud; Attendance: 0 Referee: Richard Liesveld (Netherlands)

25 July 2013 Second leg	Turnovo (North Macedonia)	1 – 1 (2 – 3 agg.)	(Croatia) Hajduk Split	Skopje
17:45 CEST	Pandev 70'	Report	Caktaš 60'	Stadium: Philip II Arena; Attendance: 2,973; Referee: Arnold Hunter (Northern Ireland)

== Statistics ==
=== Top scorers ===
Rank	Name	League	Europe	Cup	Total
1	(North Macedonia) Zoran Baldovaliev	5	1	–	6
1	(North Macedonia) Dejan Blaževski	3	3	–	6
3	(North Macedonia) Saško Pandev	–	1	2	3
4	(North Macedonia) Filip Naumčevski	2	–	–	2
5	(North Macedonia) Muzafer Ejupi	–	–	1	1
5	(North Macedonia) Iljo Mitrov	–	1	–	1
5	(North Macedonia) Tomica Petrov	1	–	–	1
5	(North Macedonia) Todi Vasilev	–	–	1	1
	TOTALS	11	6	3	20
