= 2014–15 Macedonian First Football League =

Macedonian First League
- Season: 2014–15
- Dates: 2 August 2014 – 27 May 2015
- Champions: Vardar; 8th Macedonian title 9th domestic title
- Relegated: Pelister; Teteks
- Champions League: Vardar
- Europa League: Rabotnichki; Shkëndija; Renova
- Matches: 162
- Goals: 379 (2.34 per match)
- Top goalscorer: Izair Emini (20 goals)
- Biggest home win: Shkëndija 5–0 Teteks (28 September 2014); Vardar 5–0 Teteks (29 October 2014); Shkëndija 5–0 Pelister (30 November 2014)
- Biggest away win: Teteks 0–4 Renova (5 October 2014); Teteks 1–5 Rabotnichki (26 October 2014)
- Highest scoring: Shkëndija 5–2 Turnovo (17 August 2014)
- Longest winning run: 8 games Rabotnichki
- Longest unbeaten run: 15 games Vardar; Rabotnichki
- Longest winless run: 17 games Pelister
- Longest losing run: 11 games Teteks

The 2014–15 Macedonian First League was the 23rd season of the Macedonian First Football League, the highest football league of Macedonia. It began on 2 August 2014 and ended on 27 May 2015.

That season was featured 10 teams instead of 12 because the Football Federation of Macedonia voted to decrease the size of the league in May 2013.

== Promotion and relegation ==
At the start of the 2014–15 season

Promoted from 2013–14 Second League

- Sileks (winners)
- Teteks (runners-up)

Relegated to 2014–15 Second League

- Gorno Lisiche (9th)
- Makedonija G.P. (10th)
- Napredok (11th)
- Gostivar (12th)

At the end of the 2014–15 season

Promoted from 2014–15 Second League

- Shkupi (winners)
- Mladost Carev Dvor (runners-up)

Relegated to 2015–16 Second League

- Pelister (9th)
- Teteks (10th)

== Participating teams ==
Location of teams in 2014–15 Macedonian First League

Club	City	Stadium	Capacity
Bregalnica	Shtip	Gradski stadion Shtip	4,000
Metalurg	Skopje	Training Centre Petar Miloshevski	1,000
Pelister	Bitola	Stadion Tumbe Kafe	8,000
Rabotnichki	Skopje	Philip II Arena	33,460
Renova	Djepchishte	City Stadium Tetovo	15,000
Shkëndija	Tetovo	City Stadium Tetovo	15,000
Sileks	Kratovo	Stadion Sileks	1,800
Teteks	Tetovo	City Stadium Tetovo	15,000
Horizont Turnovo	Turnovo	Stadion Kukush	1,500
Vardar	Skopje	Philip II Arena	33,460

=== Personnel and kits ===
Note: Flags indicate national team as has been defined under FIFA eligibility rules. Players may hold more than one non-FIFA nationality.

Team	Manager	Captain	Kit manufacturer	Shirt sponsor
Bregalnica	(North Macedonia) Vlatko Kostov	(North Macedonia) Goran Zdravkov	Sportika	Quehenberger
Metalurg	(North Macedonia) Srgjan Zaharievski	(North Macedonia) Mile Krstev	Legea	Makstil
Pelister	(North Macedonia) Gjoko Hadjievski	(North Macedonia) Dimche Ristevski	Jako	
Rabotnichki	(North Macedonia) Igor Angelovski	(North Macedonia) Blazhe Ilijoski	Zeus	
Renova	(North Macedonia) Qatip Osmani	(North Macedonia) Agron Memedi	Jako	Renova
Shkëndija	(North Macedonia) Jeton Beqiri	(North Macedonia) Artim Pollozhani	Nike	Ecolog
Sileks	(North Macedonia) Zoran Shterjovski	(North Macedonia) Nikolcho Georgiev	Legea	
Teteks	(North Macedonia) Gorazd Mihajlov	(North Macedonia) Vanche Manchevski	Adidas	
Turnovo	(North Macedonia) Shefki Arifovski (interim)	(North Macedonia) Sashko Pandev	Jako	Vitaminka
Vardar	(Russia) Sergey Andreyev	(North Macedonia) Zlatko Tanevski	Hummel	Makedonski Telekom

== Regular season ==
The first 27 Rounds comprise the first phase of the season, also called the Regular season. In the first phase, every team plays against every other team twice on a home-away basis till all the teams have played two matches against each other. The table standings at the end of the Regular season determine the group in which each team is going to play in the Play-offs.

=== League table ===
Pos	Team	Pld	W	D	L	GF	GA	GD	Pts	Qualification
1	Vardar	27	18	7	2	46	15	+31	61	Qualification for the championship round
2	Rabotnichki	27	17	4	6	43	23	+20	55	Qualification for the championship round
3	Shkëndija	27	14	5	8	49	27	+22	47	Qualification for the championship round
4	Renova	27	12	8	7	34	27	+7	44	Qualification for the championship round
5	Sileks	27	8	10	9	26	34	−8	34	Qualification for the championship round
6	Metalurg	27	8	9	10	31	31	0	33	Qualification for the championship round
7	Bregalnica Shtip	27	7	9	11	22	28	−6	30	Qualification for the relegation round
8	Horizont Turnovo	27	7	9	11	21	30	−9	30	Qualification for the relegation round
9	Pelister	27	5	8	14	16	28	−12	23	Qualification for the relegation round
10	Teteks	27	2	5	20	17	62	−45	11	Qualification for the relegation round

Source: MacedonianFootball.com, Soccerway
Rules for classification: 1) Points; 2) Goal difference; 3) Goals scored; 4) Head-to-head points; 5) Head-to-head goal difference; 6) Head-to-head away goals scored (only if two teams); 7) Head-to-head goals scored; 8) Draw; 9) Play-off. (Note: Criteria 2, 3 and 8 is only used if not deciding teams for championship or relegation round).

=== Results ===
Home \ Away	BRE	MET	PEL	RAB	REN	SKE	SIL	TET	TUR	VAR	BRE	MET	PEL	RAB	REN	SKE	SIL	TET	TUR	VAR
Bregalnica Shtip	—	0–1	0–0	1–2	2–0	1–3	1–1	4–1	1–1	1–2	—	—	1–0	—	—	0–0	2–0	—	—	0–0
Metalurg	3–0	—	0–0	1–2	3–0	1–1	1–1	0–2	2–0	1–4	0–0	—	3–1	—	—	—	—	0–0	0–0	—
Pelister	0–1	0–1	—	1–0	0–1	0–0	0–1	3–0	0–0	0–1	—	—	—	1–3	1–1	—	—	3–1	0–1	—
Rabotnichki	4–0	0–3	1–0	—	3–0	3–2	0–0	3–1	1–0	0–2	0–0	2–2	—	—	—	1–0	2–0	—	2–0	—
Renova	2–1	3–1	0–2	2–1	—	1–0	2–2	0–0	2–3	3–0	2–1	2–0	—	2–0	—	—	1–1	—	1–1	—
Shkëndija	2–1	2–1	5–0	1–3	1–1	—	3–0	5–0	5–2	1–2	—	2–2	2–0	—	0–1	—	—	0–1	—	3–2
Sileks	1–1	2–1	1–1	0–2	1–0	0–1	—	3–1	2–0	0–3	—	1–1	1–0	—	—	0–1	—	3–1	—	0–2
Teteks	0–1	0–1	1–1	1–5	0–4	1–2	1–3	—	0–3	2–2	0–0	—	—	1–2	1–2	—	—	—	1–3	—
Horizont Turnovo	2–1	1–0	0–1	0–1	0–0	0–1	1–1	2–0	—	0–0	0–1	—	—	—	—	0–4	1–1	—	—	0–2
Vardar	1–0	3–1	1–0	0–0	1–1	3–0	2–0	5–0	0–0	—	—	2–1	1–1	2–0	1–0	—	—	2–0	—	—

Source: MacedonianFootball.com
Legend: Blue = home team win; Yellow = draw; Red = away team win.

== Second phase ==
The second phase are the so-called Play-off Rounds which is divided in two groups: Championship and Relegation. The top 6 ranked teams on the table after the Regular Season qualify for the Championship group, while the bottom 4 advance to the Relegation group.

=== Championship round ===
In the Championship group, each team plays against every other one only once, making 5 games in total. Records from the first phase are carried over. Teams play each other once with each team playing five games in this round.

==== Table ====
Pos	Team	Pld	W	D	L	GF	GA	GD	Pts	Qualification
1	Vardar (C)	32	20	9	3	56	21	+35	69	Qualification for the Champions League second qualifying round
2	Rabotnichki	32	20	6	6	55	30	+25	66	Qualification for the Europa League first qualifying round (Note: Rabotnichki qualified for the Europa League first qualifying round by winning the 2014–15 Macedonian Football Cup.)
3	Shkëndija	32	18	5	9	58	31	+27	59	Qualification for the Europa League first qualifying round
4	Renova	32	13	9	10	41	39	+2	48	Qualification for the Europa League first qualifying round
5	Sileks	32	10	11	11	33	42	−9	41	
6	Metalurg	32	8	9	15	34	42	−8	33	

Source: MacedonianFootball.com, Soccerway
Rules for classification: 1) Points; 2) Goal difference; 3) Goals scored; 4) Head-to-head points; 5) Head-to-head goal difference; 6) Head-to-head away goals scored (only if two teams); 7) Head-to-head goals scored; 8) Draw; 9) Play-off. (Note: Criteria 2, 3 and 8 is only used if not deciding Champion or teams for UEFA competitions).
(C) Champions

==== Results ====
Home \ Away	MET	RAB	REN	SKE	SIL	VAR
Metalurg	—	—	1–2	—	1–3	—
Rabotnichki	2–0	—	—	2–1	3–1	—
Renova	—	3–3	—	—	0–1	—
Shkëndija	2–1	—	3–1	—	—	1–0
Sileks	—	—	—	0–2	—	2–2
Vardar	2–0	2–2	4–1	—	—	—

Source: MacedonianFootball.com
Legend: Blue = home team win; Yellow = draw; Red = away team win.

=== Relegation round ===
In the Relegation group, each team plays twice against every opponent on a home-away basis. Records from the first phase are carried over. Teams play each other twice with each team playing six games in this round.

==== Table ====
Pos	Team	Pld	W	D	L	GF	GA	GD	Pts	Relegation
7	Bregalnica Shtip	33	13	9	11	33	29	+4	48	
8	Horizont Turnovo (O)	33	9	9	15	26	37	−11	36	Qualification for the relegation playoff
9	Pelister (R)	33	7	9	17	21	35	−14	30	Relegation to the Macedonian Second League
10	Teteks (R)	33	3	6	24	22	73	−51	15	Relegation to the Macedonian Second League

Source: MacedonianFootball.com, Soccerway
Rules for classification: 1) Points; 2) Goal difference; 3) Goals scored; 4) Head-to-head points; 5) Head-to-head goal difference; 6) Head-to-head away goals scored (only if two teams); 7) Head-to-head goals scored; 8) Draw; 9) Play-off. (Note: Criteria 2, 3 and 8 is only used if not deciding teams for relegation).
(O) Play-off winners; (R) Relegated

==== Results ====
Home \ Away	BRE	PEL	TET	TUR
Bregalnica Shtip	—	2–0	1–0	2–1
Pelister	0–1	—	2–2	0–2
Teteks	0–4	0–2	—	3–0
Horizont Turnovo	0–1	0–1	2–0	—

Source: MacedonianFootball.com
Legend: Blue = home team win; Yellow = draw; Red = away team win.

== Relegation playoff ==
=== First leg ===
3 June 2015
16:00 CEST

Horizont Turnovo	1–1	Gostivar
Gjorgiev 22'	Report	Nurishi 56'

Gradski stadion, Probishtip
Attendance: 500
Referee: Aleksandar Stavrev (Skopje)

=== Second leg ===
7 June 2015
16:00 CEST

Gostivar	0–2	Horizont Turnovo
	Report	Ivanov 15'; Tashev 35'

Gradski stadion, Probishtip
Attendance: 600
Referee: Stevche Shulevski (Ohrid)

Horizont Turnovo won 3–1 on aggregate

== Season statistics ==
=== Top scorers ===
As of 24 May 2015

Rank	Player	Club	Goals
1	(North Macedonia) Izair Emini	Renova	20
2	(Croatia) Bojan Vručina	Shkendija	18
3	(North Macedonia) Marjan Altiparmakovski	Rabotnichki	15
4	(North Macedonia) Hristijan Kirovski	Shkendija	14
5	(North Macedonia) Filip Ivanovski	Vardar	11
6	(North Macedonia) Marjan Radeski	Metalurg	10
7	(North Macedonia) Aco Stojkov	Rabotnichki	9
8	(North Macedonia) Dejan Blazhevski	Vardar	8
8	(North Macedonia) Blazhe Ilijoski	Rabotnichki	8
8	(Bosnia and Herzegovina) Boško Stupić	Pelister & Bregalnica	8

== See also ==
- 2014–15 Macedonian Football Cup
- 2014–15 Macedonian Second Football League
- 2014–15 Macedonian Third Football League
