= Shqiprim Taipi =

Kosovo Albanian footballer

Personal information
- Full name: Shqiprim Izir Taipi
- Date of birth: 19 February 1997 (age 29)
- Place of birth: Bujanovac, FR Yugoslavia
- Height: 1.74 m (5 ft 9 in)
- Position: Midfielder

Team information
- Current team: Gjilani
- Number: 27

Youth career
- –2015: Shkëndija

Senior career*
Years	Team	Apps	(Gls)
2015–2019	Shkëndija	11	(0)
2015–2016	→ Horizont Turnovo (loan)	23	(0)
2017–2018	→ Shkupi (loan)	14	(0)
2018	→ Prishtina (loan)	12	(0)
2019–2021	Skënderbeu	64	(2)
2021–2023	Kukësi	62	(4)
2023	Caspiy	12	(2)
2024	Gjilani	10	(0)
2024	Zhetysu	8	(0)
2025–	Gjilani	40	(0)

International career
2012–2013	Albania U17	2	(0)
- * Club domestic league appearances and goals as of 22 June 2026

Shqiprim Izir Taipi (Serbian Cyrillic: Шћиприм Таипи; born 19 February 1997) is an Albanian professional footballer who plays as a midfielder for Gjilani.

== Club career ==
=== Shkëndija ===
In June 2015, Taipi signed his first professional contract with Shkëndija as an 18-year old, inking for the next three years, and he returned to his parent club Shkëndija for the next season. On 8 August 2016, he debuted by playing full-90 minutes in the 2–1 win over Sileks.

==== Loan at Horizont Turnovo ====
Then he began his professional career as a loanee at fellow top flight side Horizont Turnovo, where he played 21 games in the 2015–16 season. On 13 September 2015, he made his professional debut by appearing in the last minutes of a 5–1 away defeat to Vardar.

==== Loan at Shkupi ====
On 2 July 2017, Taipi was loaned again this time at Shkupi, on a six-month loan. He was presented along with fellow loanee Shpend Asani and took squad number 22. On 13 August 2017, he played his first game for the club by starting in the 1–1 draw versus Akademija Pandev. He played 14 games for the club, 10 as starter before leaving in January of the following year.

==== Loan at Prishtina ====
On 31 January 2018, Taipi was sent on loan at Football Superleague of Kosovo club Prishtina for the remaining part of 2017–18 season. He played 12 matches in the league as Prishtina finished runner-up. On 27 May 2018, he won his first trophy after Prishtina defeated Vëllaznimi, on penalty shootouts to clinch the 2017–18 Kosovar Cup.

=== Skënderbeu Korçë ===
On 19 January 2019, Taipi signed a two-and-a-half-year contract with Kategoria Superiore club Skënderbeu Korçë. Three days later, he made his debut with Skënderbeu Korçë in the 2018–19 Albanian Cup second round against Besëlidhja Lezhë after being named in the starting line-up. He made his first Kategoria Superiore appearance on 25 January after coming on as a substitute at 46th minute in place of Arnaud Guedj in a 0–1 minimal home defeat against Partizani Tirana.

== International career ==
Taipi has been called only once by Albania U17 for a training camp.

== Personal life ==
Taipi was born in Vranje, FR Yugoslavia to Albanian parents from Veliki Trnovac, a village near Bujanovac and is the younger brother of professional footballer Gjelbrim Taipi, who plays for Albanian club Kukësi and the Kosovo national team.

== Career statistics ==
=== Club ===
As of 29 July 2020

Appearances and goals by club, season and competition
Club	Season	League			Cup		Europe (Note: Includes UEFA Champions League and UEFA Europa League)		Other		Total	
Club	Season	Division	Apps	Goals	Apps	Goals	Apps	Goals	Apps	Goals	Apps	Goals
Shkëndija	2016–17	Macedonian First Football League	6	0	0	0	7	0	0	0	13	0
Shkëndija	2017–18	Macedonian First Football League	0	0	0	0	0	0	0	0	0	0
Shkëndija	2018–19	Macedonian First Football League	5	0	0	0	3	0	0	0	8	0
Shkëndija	Total		11	0	0	0	10	0	0	0	21	0
Horizont Turnovo (loan)	2015–16	Macedonian First Football League	23	0	2	0	—		—		25	0
Shkupi (loan)	2017–18	Macedonian First Football League	14	0	0	0	—		—		14	0
Prishtina (loan)	2017–18	Football Superleague of Kosovo	12	0	1	0	—		—		13	0
Skënderbeu Korçë	2018–19	Kategoria Superiore	7	0	3	0	—		—		10	0
Skënderbeu Korçë	2019–20	Kategoria Superiore	29	1	2	0	—		—		31	1
Skënderbeu Korçë	Total		36	1	5	0	0	0	0	0	41	1
Career total			96	1	8	0	10	0	0	0	114	1

== Honours ==
Prishtina

- Kosovar Cup: 2017–18
