= Jasir Asani =

Albanian footballer (born 1995)

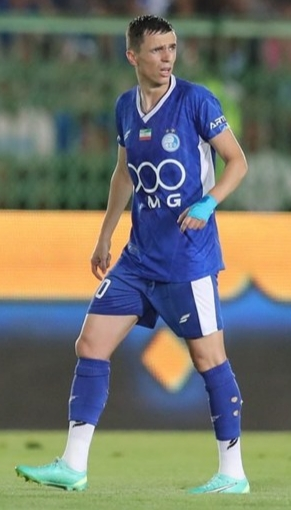
- Asani with Esteghlal in 2025

Personal information
- Full name: Jasir Fadil Asani
- Date of birth: 19 May 1995 (age 31)
- Place of birth: Skopje, North Macedonia
- Height: 1.75 m (5 ft 9 in)
- Position: Right winger

Team information
- Current team: Esteghlal
- Number: 7

Youth career
- 2010–2013: Vardar

Senior career*
Years	Team	Apps	(Gls)
2013–2017	Vardar	69	(17)
2017	→ Shkupi (loan)	13	(3)
2017	Pobeda	2	(0)
2017–2019	Partizani B	5	(3)
2017–2021	Partizani	123	(27)
2020	→ AIK (loan)	7	(2)
2021–2023	Kisvárda	52	(10)
2023–2025	Gwangju	81	(27)
2025–	Esteghlal	30	(11)

International career^{‡}
2014–2015	Macedonia U21	4	(0)
2016	Albania U21	1	(1)
2023–	Albania	26	(6)
- * Club domestic league appearances and goals as of 7 November 2026 ‡ National team caps and goals as of 31 March 2026

Jasir Fadil Asani (born 19 May 1995) is a professional footballer who plays as a right winger for Persian Gulf Pro League club Esteghlal and the Albania national team.

== Club career ==
=== Early life and career ===
Asani was born in Skopje to Albanian parents, from the village of Batinci. Asani begun his professional career with Macedonian club Vardar, making his debut on 25 August 2013 by coming on in the last minutes of a 2–0 away defeat to Turnovo.

On 1 March 2014, he scored his first professional career goal in a 1–2 defeat to Rabotnički. Asani then recorded his first career hat-trick in a 6–0 win over Napredok on 30 March 2014.

==== Shkupi (loan) ====
On 25 January 2017, Asani was loaned out to Shkupi for the second half of the 2016–17 season. On 12 March 2017, he scored a brace to secure a 3–2 win for the team against Renova. He ended the season with 3 goals and 4 assists in 13 matches before returning to Vardar.

=== Pobeda ===
On 24 July 2017, Asani then moved to Pobeda on a free transfer. He make his debut on 13 August in a 1–2 lost to Pelister.

=== Partizani ===
Asani completed a transfer to Albanian club Partizani on 23 September 2017, after the expiration of the transfer window. As a result, he was initially relegated to Partizani B. He scored a hat-trick on 14 October for Partizani B against Sopoti to give his side the 4–1 victory.

He made his professional debut on 29 October with Partizani against Flamurtari, coming on as a substitute in the 81st minute in place of Milan Basrak.

Asani scored his first goal for Partizani on 4 February 2018 in a 2–1 home win over Kamza.

==== AIK (loan) ====
On 7 January 2020, Asani was loaned to Swedish side AIK until the end of the season with an option to buy for €400,000. He scored on his debut in the Allsvenskan, 2–0 win at Örebro on 14 June. After only seven appearances in all competitions, in a season which was prolonged by the COVID-19 pandemic, AIK did not exercise the buy clause for Asani, who returned to Partizani for the 2020–21 season.

=== Kisvárda ===
On 8 July 2021, Asani then moved to Hungarian club Kisvárda. He make his debut in a 2–1 win over Ferencváros on 31 July. He scored his first goal for the club in a 2–2 draw against Paksi on 22 October.

=== Gwangju FC ===
On 28 December 2022, Asani joined K League 1 side Gwangju FC on a permanent deal. On his debut for the club on 23 February 2023, he scored the only goal to secure a 1–0 win over Suwon Samsung Bluewings. Asani then scored his second career hat-trick in a 5–0 win over Incheon United on 18 March.

On 17 September 2024, Asani became the first player to scored a hat-trick in the inaugural 2024–25 AFC Champions League Elite against Japanese club Yokohama F. Marinos in a 7–3 thrashing win. Asani then scored the winning goal in the AFC Champions League Elite fixture against Japanese club Kawasaki Frontale on 1 October where he scored the only goal to secure the 3 points for the team. In the third AFC Champions League Elite fixture against Malaysian club Johor Darul Ta'zim, Asani scored a brace within 6 minutes into the match which then secured a 3–1 win for the club.

On 12 March 2025, Jasir Asani played a decisive role in Gwangju FC's historic comeback in the AFC Champions League Elite Round of 16 against Japanese club Vissel Kobe. Trailing 0–2 from the first leg, Asani led the charge in the second leg by scoring a crucial penalty in the 83rd minute to level the aggregate score. In extra time, he netted the decisive goal, securing a 3–0 victory on the night and a 3–2 aggregate win, sending Gwangju to the quarter-finals.

=== Esteghlal ===
On 21 August 2025, Asani joined Iranian club Esteghlal after two-and-a-half seasons in the K League 1, signing a contract until June 2027. Asani made his debut five days later, coming on at half-time with Esteghlal trailing 3–1 against Zob Ahan at home, as his side recovered from the two-goal deficit to secure a 3–3 draw. He scored his first goals on 21 September, netting twice in a 2–2 home draw against Paykan, equalising in first-half stoppage time before converting a penalty in the 80th minute to rescue a point for his side. Due to the 2026 Iran war, the Pro League was suspended with Esteghlal sitting top of the table on 41 points from 22 matches, having recorded 11 wins, eight draws and three defeats.

Asani made his continental debut on 17 September, starting in a 7–1 away defeat to Al Wasl in the opening fixture of the AFC Champions League Two group-stage, before being substituted in the 74th minute. During the group stage Asani scored twice, finding the net in a 2–0 win over Al-Wehdat on 22 October and again in a 3–0 victory over Al-Muharraq on 24 December, when his 87th-minute goal sealed Esteghlal's qualification for the round of 16 as Group A runners-up. He scored twice in the round of 16 second leg against Al-Hussein on 17 February 2026, first converting a penalty in the 10th minute and then scoring again in the 49th to give Esteghlal a 2–1 lead and level the aggregate score at 2–2; however, Al-Hussein scored twice late in the match to advance 4–2 on aggregate. He finished the competition with four goals and one assist in eight appearances.

Following the resumption of Iranian football in August 2026, Asani scored in a 2–0 win over Sepahan on 23 August and again in a 1–1 draw against Persepolis on 2 September. On 12 September, Esteghlal announced that the dispute surrounding Asani's contract had been resolved after the Iranian Football Federation ruled the agreement valid, allowing him to continue playing without facing suspension. On 14 September, Asani scored once and provided an assist in Esteghlal's 3–0 victory over Al Sadd in the opening match of the 2026–27 AFC Champions League Elite, earning the player of the match award. On 3 November, Asani scored the only goal in a 1–0 victory over Al Shamal in the fourth round of the Champions League Elite, securing the win for Esteghlal with a diagonal strike from the right side of the penalty area, where was subsequently named man of the match.

== International career ==
Having represented Macedonian at several youth levels, Asani received Albanian citizenship on 18 March 2016, joining the Albania under-21 player pool. He played his first international match for the Albania under-21 side on 22 January 2016 by netting his side's only goal in the 1–1 draw versus Saudi Arabia.

After taking charge of the Albanian national team in 2023, Sylvinho sought a left-footed right winger for his 4–3–3 formation and identified Asani through the Albanian Football Federation's database, subsequently reviewing footage of his performances in Hungary and watching his matches in South Korea, sometimes arriving at the office at 9 am because of the time difference. Sylvinho called up Asani for the Euro 2024 qualifiers in March, giving him his senior debut as a starter in a 1–0 away defeat to Poland on 27 March, in which he played 70 minutes. He scored his first goal on 17 June, opening the scoring in a 2–0 home win over Moldova in the next qualifying fixture with a long-range strike in the 52nd minute. Asani subsequently provided two assists and scored two further goals during the qualifying campaign, while featured in all of Albania's Group E matches as the team finished top of the group for the first time and secured qualification for UEFA Euro 2024, its second appearance at the European Championship.

In June 2024, Asani was named in Sylvinho's final 26-man squad for the final tournament in Germany, and featured in all three of Albania's Group B matches, while making his tournament debut on 15 June 2024 in a 2–1 defeat to Italy in Dortmund, where Albania had taken an early lead through Nedim Bajrami's record-breaking goal after 23 seconds. On 19 June, Asani provided the assist for Qazim Laçi's opening goal with a cross in a 2–2 draw against Croatia in Hamburg, with Albania scoring a late equaliser. In their final group match on 24 June, Albania suffered a 1–0 defeat to Spain in Düsseldorf, finishing bottom of the group with one point and being eliminated.

== Career statistics ==
=== Club ===
As of match played 7 November 2026

Appearances and goals by club, season and competition
Club	Season	League			National cup (Note: Includes Macedonian Football Cup, Albanian Cup, Svenska Cupen, Magyar Kupa, Korean FA Cup)		Continental		Other		Total	
Club	Season	Division	Apps	Goals	Apps	Goals	Apps	Goals	Apps	Goals	Apps	Goals
Vardar	2013–14	Macedonian First Football League	12	7	—		—		—		12	7
Vardar	2014–15	Macedonian First Football League	26	5	2	1	—		—		28	6
Vardar	2015–16	Macedonian First Football League	15	3	—		1 (Note: Appearance(s) in UEFA Champions League)	0	—		16	3
Vardar	2016–17	Macedonian First Football League	13	2	2	0	2	0	—		17	2
Vardar	Total		66	17	4	1	3	0	0	0	73	18
Shkupi (loan)	2016–17	Macedonian First Football League	14	3	—		—		2 (Note: Appearances in Macedonian First Football League relegation play-offs)	0	16	3
Pobeda	2017–18	Macedonian First Football League	2	0	—		—		—		2	0
Partizani B	2017–18	Kategoria e Dytë	8	12	—		—		—		8	12
Partizani B	2018–19	Kategoria e Dytë	1	0	—		—		—		1	0
Partizani B	Total		9	12	0	0	0	0	0	0	9	12
Partizani	2017–18	Kategoria Superiore	29	4	4	1	—		—		33	5
Partizani	2018–19	Kategoria Superiore	33	8	3	0	2 (Note: Appearances in UEFA Europa League)	0	—		38	8
Partizani	2019–20	Kategoria Superiore	14	3	1	0	4 (Note: Two appearances in UEFA Champions League, two appearances and one goal in UEFA Europa League)	1	1 (Note: Appearance in Albanian Supercup)	0	20	4
Partizani	2020–21	Kategoria Superiore	30	9	2	1	—		—		32	10
Partizani	Total		106	24	10	2	6	1	1	0	123	27
AIK (loan)	2020	Allsvenskan	4	1	3	1	—		—		7	2
Kisvárda	2021–22	Nemzeti Bajnokság I	29	6	2	1	—		—		31	7
Kisvárda	2022–23	Nemzeti Bajnokság I	15	0	2	0	4 (Note: Appearances in UEFA Europa Conference League)	3	—		21	3
Kisvárda	Total		44	6	4	1	4	3	0	0	52	10
Gwangju FC	2023	K League 1	33	7	—		—		—		33	7
Gwangju FC	2024	K League 1	13	3	2	0	10 (Note: Appearances in AFC Champions League Elite)	9	—		25	12
Gwangju FC	2025	K League 1	22	8	1	0	—		—		23	8
Gwangju FC	Total		68	18	3	0	10	9	0	0	81	27
Esteghlal	2025–26	Persian Gulf Pro League	19	7	2	2	8	4	—		29	13
Esteghlal	2026–27	Persian Gulf Pro League	11	4	0	0	4	3	—		15	7
Esteghlal	Total		30	11	2	2	12	7	0	0	44	20
Career total			343	92	26	7	35	20	3	0	407	119

=== International ===
As of match played 31 March 2026

Appearances and goals by national team and year
National team	Year	Apps	Goals
Albania	2023	9	3
Albania	2024	13	2
Albania	2025	3	1
Albania	2026	1	0
Total		26	6

Scores and results list Albania's goal tally first, score column indicates score after each Asani goal.

List of international goals scored by Jasir Asani
No.	Date	Venue	Opponent	Score	Result	Competition
1	17 June 2023	Arena Kombëtare, Tirana, Albania	Moldova	1–0	2–0	UEFA Euro 2024 qualifying
2	10 September 2023	Arena Kombëtare, Tirana, Albania	Poland	1–0	2–0	UEFA Euro 2024 qualifying
3	12 October 2023	Arena Kombëtare, Tirana, Albania	Czech Republic	1–0	3–0	UEFA Euro 2024 qualifying
4	3 June 2024	Haladás Sportkomplexum, Szombathely, Hungary	Liechtenstein	2–0	3–0	Friendly
5	7 September 2024	Stadion Letná, Prague, Czech Republic	Ukraine	2–1	2–1	2024–25 UEFA Nations League B
6	4 September 2025	Europa Sports Park, Gibraltar	Gibraltar	1–0	1–0	Friendly

== Honours ==
Vardar

- Macedonian First League: 2014–15, 2015–16, 2016–17

FK Partizani Tirana

- Kategoria Superiore: 2018–19
- Albanian Supercup: 2019
