= 2014–15 Macedonian Second Football League =

Macedonian Second League
- Season: 2014–15
- Champions: Shkupi
- Promoted: Shkupi; Mladost
- Relegated: Drita; Napredok
- Matches: 135
- Goals: 308 (2.28 per match)
- Biggest home win: Shkupi 8–0 Napredok
- Biggest away win: Napredok 3–9 Makedonija G.P.
- Highest scoring: Napredok 3–9 Makedonija G.P.
- Longest winning run: 8 games Shkupi
- Longest unbeaten run: 11 games Shkupi
- Longest winless run: 19 games Napredok
- Longest losing run: 18 games Napredok

The 2014–15 Macedonian Second League was the 23rd season of the Macedonian Second Football League, the second football division of Macedonia. It began on 9 August 2014 and ended on 23 May 2015.

In that season, 10 teams performs instead of 16 because the Football Federation of Macedonia in May 2013 voted for decision on the decrease of the league.

== Participating teams ==
Location of teams in 2014–15 Macedonian Second League

Club	City	Stadium	Capacity
Drita	Bogovinje	Stadion Bogovinje	500
Euromilk Gorno Lisiche	Skopje	Stadion Cementarnica ^{1}	2,000
Gostivar	Gostivar	Gradski stadion Gostivar	1,000
Kozhuf Miravci	Gevgelija	Gradski stadion Gevgelija	2,500
Makedonija G.P.	Skopje	Stadion Gjorche Petrov	3,000
Mladost	Carev Dvor	Gradski stadion Resen ^{2}	1,500
Napredok	Kichevo	Gradski stadion Kichevo	5,000
Shkupi	Skopje	Chair Stadium	6,000
Skopje	Skopje	Stadion Avtokomanda	4,000
Vëllazërimi 77 ^{3}	Kichevo	Vëllazërimi Arena	3,000

^{1} Gorno Lisiche played until 11th round on Boris Trajkovski Stadium.

^{2} Mladost Carev Dvor played their first 2 home games on SRC Biljanini Izvori in Ohrid, due to expanding their stadium in Resen.
Also, the club was played one home match on Stadion Tumbe Kafe in Bitola.

^{3} Vëllazërimi participated in the first part of season as Vrapchishte.

== League table ==
Pos	Team	Pld	W	D	L	GF	GA	GD	Pts	Promotion or relegation
1	Shkupi (C, P)	27	16	5	6	44	19	+25	53	Promotion to Macedonian First League
2	Mladost Carev Dvor (P)	27	14	5	8	40	27	+13	47	Promotion to Macedonian First League
3	Gostivar	27	12	8	7	31	27	+4	44	Qualification to Promotion play-off
4	Makedonija G.P.	27	11	8	8	29	18	+11	41	
5	Skopje	27	10	9	8	27	19	+8	39	
6	Vëllazërimi	27	10	9	8	31	24	+7	39	
7	Kozhuf Miravci	27	9	11	7	28	20	+8	38	
8	Euromilk Gorno Lisiche (O)	27	10	5	12	29	38	−9	35	Qualification to Relegation play-off
9	Drita (R)	27	8	3	16	26	38	−12	27	Relegation to Macedonian Third League
10	Napredok (R)	27	2	3	22	23	78	−55	9	Relegation to Macedonian Third League

Source: MacedonianFootball.com, Soccerway
Rules for classification: 1) Points; 2) Head-to-head points; 3) Head-to-head goal difference; 4) Head-to-head away goals scored
(C) Champions; (O) Play-off winners; (P) Promoted; (R) Relegated

== Results ==
=== Matches 1–18 ===
Home \ Away	DRI	EGL	GOS	MGP	MIR	MLA	NAP	SHK	SKO	VLZ
Drita	—	1–2	1–0	2–0	0–4	1–2	5–0	0–1	2–0	0–1
Euromilk Gorno Lisiche	1–0	—	1–2	0–2	1–1	2–1	2–3	1–3	2–1	2–0
Gostivar	2–1	2–1	—	1–0	0–1	1–0	6–3	1–2	1–0	0–0
Makedonija	1–0	1–0	0–0	—	0–0	4–0	2–0	0–1	1–1	0–3
Miravci	0–0	1–1	2–1	0–0	—	1–2	1–1	1–0	2–0	1–1
Mladost Carev Dvor	1–1	1–1	5–0	1–1	2–1	—	3–0	1–3	2–0	2–0
Napredok	3–1	1–4	1–1	3–9	0–1	2–5	—	1–1	0–1	0–1
Shkupi	3–1	4–2	1–2	1–0	2–0	1–0	2–0	—	2–0	2–0
Skopje	3–0	0–1	0–0	2–0	2–0	2–0	1–0	1–1	—	0–0
Vëllazërimi	0–2	4–0	1–1	0–1	1–0	1–2	3–1	2–2	0–0	—

Source: MacedonianFootball.com
Legend: Blue = home team win; Yellow = draw; Red = away team win.

=== Matches 19–27 ===
Home \ Away	DRI	EGL	GOS	MGP	MIR	MLA	NAP	SHK	SKO	VLZ
Drita	—	—	1–0	—	0–3	—	—	1–0	1–1	—
Euromilk Gorno Lisiche	1–0	—	1–1	—	2–1	—	—	0–1	—	—
Gostivar	—	—	—	2–0	—	—	3–1	2–1	0–0	1–0
Makedonija	1–0	2–0	—	—	0–0	0–0	—	—	—	1–0
Miravci	—	—	1–1	—	—	—	2–0	2–0	1–1	1–1
Mladost Carev Dvor	2–0	2–0	2–0	—	1–0	—	—	—	—	1–1
Napredok	2–3	0–1	—	0–3	—	1–2	—	—	—	—
Shkupi	—	—	—	0–0	—	2–0	8–0	—	0–0	0–1
Skopje	—	1–0	—	1–0	—	1–0	4–0	—	—	—
Vëllazërimi	4–2	0–0	—	—	—	—	3–0	—	3–2	—

Source: MacedonianFootball.com
Legend: Blue = home team win; Yellow = draw; Red = away team win.

== Promotion playoff ==
=== First leg ===
3 June 2015
16:00 CEST

Horizont Turnovo	1–1	Gostivar
Gjorgiev 22'	Report	Nurishi 56'

Gradski stadion, Probishtip

=== Second leg ===
7 June 2015
16:00 CEST

Gostivar	0–2	Horizont Turnovo
	Report	Ivanov 15'; Tashev 35'

Gradski stadion, Probishtip

Horizont Turnovo won 3–1 on aggregate

== Relegation playoff ==
The Relegation Playoff includes 6 clubs (the 8th placed theam from the Second League, as well as the 5 winners of the Third Leagues) which are going to be arranged in 3 pairs, playing on home-away rule. The winners of those playoffs win a spot for the next seasons Second League.

=== First leg ===
3 June 2015
16:00 CEST

Zajazi	1–4	Euromilk Gorno Lisiche
Ismaili 20'		Jasharoski 7', 38' (pen.), 85'; Jovanovski 80'

Gradski stadion, Shtip
3 June 2015
16:00 CEST

Ljubanci 1974	4–1	Veleshta
Janchevski 33', 48', 60'; Lazarevski 57'		Isaku 66' (pen.)

Stadion Goce Delchev, Prilep
3 June 2015
16:00 CEST

Pobeda	4–1	Belasica
Meglenski 32' (pen.), 85', 90+2'; Alomerovikj 90+3'		Petkov 62' (pen.)

Stadion Gjorche Petrov, Skopje

=== Second leg ===
7 June 2015
16:00 CEST

Euromilk Gorno Lisiche	3–0 (Awarded)	Zajazi

Gradski stadion, Shtip

Gorno Lisiče won 7–1 on aggregate

7 June 2015
16:00 CEST

Veleshta	0–3	Ljubanci 1974
		Argirovski 13', 77'; Janchevski 70'

Stadion Goce Delchev, Prilep

Ljubanci 1974 won 7–1 on aggregate

7 June 2015
16:00 CEST

Belasica	1–1	Pobeda
Donev 83'		I. Mirchevski 46'

Stadion Gjorche Petrov, Skopje

Pobeda won 5–2 on aggregate

== See also ==
- 2014–15 Macedonian Football Cup
- 2014–15 Macedonian First Football League
- 2014–15 Macedonian Third Football League
