= Martin Hristov =

Martin Hristov may refer to:

- Martin Hristov (footballer, born 1980), Bulgarian footballer
- Martin Hristov (footballer, born 1997), Macedonian footballer
- Martin Hristov (footballer, born 2003), Bulgarian footballer
- Martin Hristov (Undercover), a fictional character on the BNT crime series Undercover
