= Husein Demiri =

Macedonian footballer (born 1995)

Personal information
- Date of birth: 6 September 1995 (age 31)
- Place of birth: Skopje, Macedonia
- Height: 1.85 m (6 ft 1 in)
- Position: Forward

Team information
- Current team: Bashkimi

Senior career*
Years	Team	Apps	(Gls)
2013–2014	Rabotnichki	2	(0)
2014	Makedonija GP		
2015–2018	Shkupi	55	(5)
2018	Vëllazërimi		
2018	PS Kemi	13	(0)
2019	Ferizaj	8	(2)
2019	Dukagjini	13	(2)
2020–2021	A&N		
2021–2022	Teteks		
2022–2023	Gostivari		
2023	Ohrid		
2024–	Bashkimi		(13)

International career
	Macedonia U18	1	(0)
- * Club domestic league appearances and goals as of 8 May 2025

Husein Demiri (born 6 September 1995) is a Macedonian professional footballer who plays as a forward for Bashkimi in Macedonian Second League.

== Club career ==
Demiri started his career in his native Macedonia, playing for Rabotnichki, Makedonija GP, Shkupi and Vëllazërimi. In July 2018 Demiri moved to Finland and signed with Veikkausliiga club PS Kemi for the remainder of the season. After the season he continued his career in Kosovo with Ferizaj.

== Honours ==
Rabotnichki

- Macedonian First League: 2013–14
- Macedonian Cup: 2013–14

Makedonija GP

- Macedonian Second League: 2014–15
