= Minas Osmani =

Macedonian footballer

Personal information
- Full name: Minas Osmani
- Date of birth: 22 February 1985 (age 41)
- Place of birth: Skopje, SFR Yugoslavia
- Height: 1.70 m (5 ft 7 in)
- Position: Midfielder

Senior career*
Years	Team	Apps	(Gls)
2004–2005	Vardar	2	(0)
2005–2006	Vlazrimi	14	(3)
2006–2007	Renova	23	(1)
2007–2009	Rabotnički	41	(2)
2009–2010	Metalurg		
2010	Renova	11	(1)
2010	Besa Kavaje	9	(0)
2011	Tikvesh	1	(0)
2011	Olimpic Sarajevo	8	(0)
2012	Travnik		
2012–2014	Drita		
2014	Shkupi		
2015	Gostivari		
2017	Vitia		
2019	Drita		

Managerial career
- 2025: Shkupi
- * Club domestic league appearances and goals as of 9 December 2012 ‡ National team caps and goals as of 14 February 2012

Minas Osmani (Macedonian: Минас Османи) (born 22 February 1985) is a midfielder from North Macedonia of Albanian ethnicity.

== Club career ==
Osmani has played at a number of Macedonian clubs that include the likes of FK Rabotnički, FK Vardar, FK Vlazrimi, FK Cementarnica 55 Skopje, FK Milano Kumanovo, FK Renova, GFK Tikvesh. He also played for the Kosovan squad Vitia.

== International career ==
Minas Osmani was ever present in Macedonian Youth National Teams where he was capped 33 times and scored a total of 7 goals.
