= Dragan Gjorgiev =

Macedonian footballer (born 1990)

Personal information
- Full name: Dragan Gjorgiev
- Date of birth: 16 December 1990 (age 35)
- Place of birth: Radoviš, SFR Yugoslavia
- Height: 1.70 m (5 ft 7 in)
- Position: Left wing

Team information
- Current team: FC Rotkreuz

Youth career
- Plačkovica
- Horizont Turnovo

Senior career*
Years	Team	Apps	(Gls)
2008–2012	Horizont Turnovo	72	(19)
2010–2011	→ Mainz 05 (loan)	0	(0)
2010–2011	→ Paderborn 07 (loan)	1	(0)
2012–2014	Vardar	33	(4)
2014–2015	Horizont Turnovo	23	(7)
2015–2017	FC Wangen bei Olten	42	(16)
2017–	FC Rotkreuz		

International career^{‡}
	Macedonia U-17	3	(0)
	Macedonia U-19	4	(0)
2009–2012	Macedonia U-21	9	(3)
2012	Macedonia	3	(0)
- * Club domestic league appearances and goals as of 18 July 2012 ‡ National team caps and goals as of 14 December 2012

Dragan Gjorgiev (Macedonian: Драган Ѓоргиев) (born 16 December 1990 in Radoviš) is a Macedonian footballer who played for Swiss lower league sides from 2015/2016 to 2022/2023. He was also a member of the Macedonian Under-21 team. His last name is often transliterated as Georgiev.

== Club career ==
Gjorgiev began his career with FK Plačkovica from Radoviš and latter at the age of 15 he joined FK Turnovo. On 19 July 2010, he left FK Turnovo and joined Bundesliga club 1. FSV Mainz 05 on loan for one season. Mainz liked his talent but considered he was not ready for the Bundesliga, so he was loaned for one season in order to get match practice to 2. Bundesliga team SC Paderborn 07 on 31 August 2010.

Gjorgiev made his debut for Paderborn on 24 September 2010 when he came off the bench in the 62nd minute in a 2–0 loss away to Alemannia Aachen. That was his only league game in Germany as during the summer of 2011, Georgiev returned to Turnovo. In June 2012, he signed for league champions FK Vardar. He moved to Switzerland where he played from the 2015/2016 season alongside compatriot Cvetan Churlinov.

== International career ==
He made his senior debut for Macedonia in a September 2012 FIFA World Cup qualification match away against Croatia and has earned a total of 3 caps, scoring no goals. His final international was a December 2012 friendly match against Poland.
