= Andreja Efremov =

Macedonian footballer

Personal information
- Full name: Andreja Efremov
- Date of birth: 2 September 1992 (age 34)
- Place of birth: Sveti Nikole, Macedonia
- Height: 1.91 m (6 ft 3 in)
- Position: Goalkeeper

Team information
- Current team: Skopje
- Number: 31

Youth career
- 1999–2006: Ovče Pole
- 2006–2008: Vardar

Senior career*
Years	Team	Apps	(Gls)
2009–2014	Metalurg	109	(0)
2014–2015	Rabotnički	8	(0)
2015–2016	Renova	29	(1)
2016–2017	Famalicão	4	(0)
2017–2018	Lokomotiv Sofia	17	(0)
2018–2019	Sileks	22	(0)
2020	Vllaznia Shkodër	9	(0)
2021	Borec Veles	6	(0)
2021–	Skopje	52	(0)

International career
2009–2011	Macedonia U19	18	(0)
2010–2013	Macedonia U21	7	(0)
2014	Macedonia	2	(0)
- * Club domestic league appearances and goals as of 1 May 2023

Andreja Efremov (Macedonian: Андреја Ефремов, born 2 September 1992) is a Macedonian footballer who plays as a goalkeeper for Skopje. He has also represented Macedonia in the UEFA European Under-21 Championship.

== International career ==
He made his senior debut for Macedonia in a May 2014 friendly match against Qatar and has earned a total of 2 caps, conceding no goals. His second and final international was a June 2014 friendly away against China.
