= Jane Nikoloski =

Macedonian former footballer (born 1973)

Personal information
- Date of birth: 12 December 1973 (age 52)
- Place of birth: Prilep, SFR Yugoslavia
- Height: 1.88 m (6 ft 2 in)
- Position: Goalkeeper

Senior career*
| Years | Team | Apps | (Gls) |
| 1990–1993 | Pobeda | | |
| 1993–1996 | Prespa | | |
| 1996–1997 | Pelister | | |
| 1997–1999 | Apollon Kalamarias | | |
| 1999–2001 | Sloga Jugomagnat | 49 | (0) |
| 2001–2003 | Slavia Sofia | 33 | (0) |
| 2003–2004 | Sloga Jugomagnat | | |
| 2004 | Napredok | 2 | (0) |
| 2005 | Persepolis | 0 | (0) |
| 2006–2007 | Slaven Belupo | 41 | (0) |
| 2007–2008 | APOEL | 23 | (0) |
| 2008–2009 | Paphos | 16 | (0) |
| 2009–2010 | Aris Limassol | 15 | (0) |

International career
| 2000–2009 | Macedonia | 27 | (0) |

Managerial career
- 2014–2015: Pobeda (youth)
- 2015: Aris Limassol
- 2015–2016: Turnovo
- 2018–2019: Pobeda
- * Club domestic league appearances and goals

Jane Nikoloski (Macedonian: Јане Николоски; born 12 December 1973) is a Macedonian football manager and former player. He played as a goalkeeper.

== Playing career ==
=== Club ===
Nikoloski returned from Bulgaria for Sloga Jugomagnat in July 2003. In 2005, he left for Iranian club Persepolis In January 2006, he was signed by Croatian club Slaven Belupo. In June 2007, he joined APOEL where he helped his team to win the 2007–08 Cypriot Cup. In January 2009, he moved to AEP Paphos.

=== International ===
Nikolovski made his senior debut for the Macedonia national team in a July 2000 friendly match against Azerbaijan and has earned a total of 27 caps, scoring no goals. He was the first-choice goalkeeper for Macedonia in UEFA Euro 2008 qualifying, playing the first seven games. He was then replaced by Petar Miloševski. His final international was a September 2009 FIFA World Cup qualification match against Scotland.

== Managerial career ==
After was in 2014 managed Pobeda Junior, Nikoloski in September 2015 became a coach of Turnovo.
