= Dejan Blazhevski =

Macedonian professional footballer

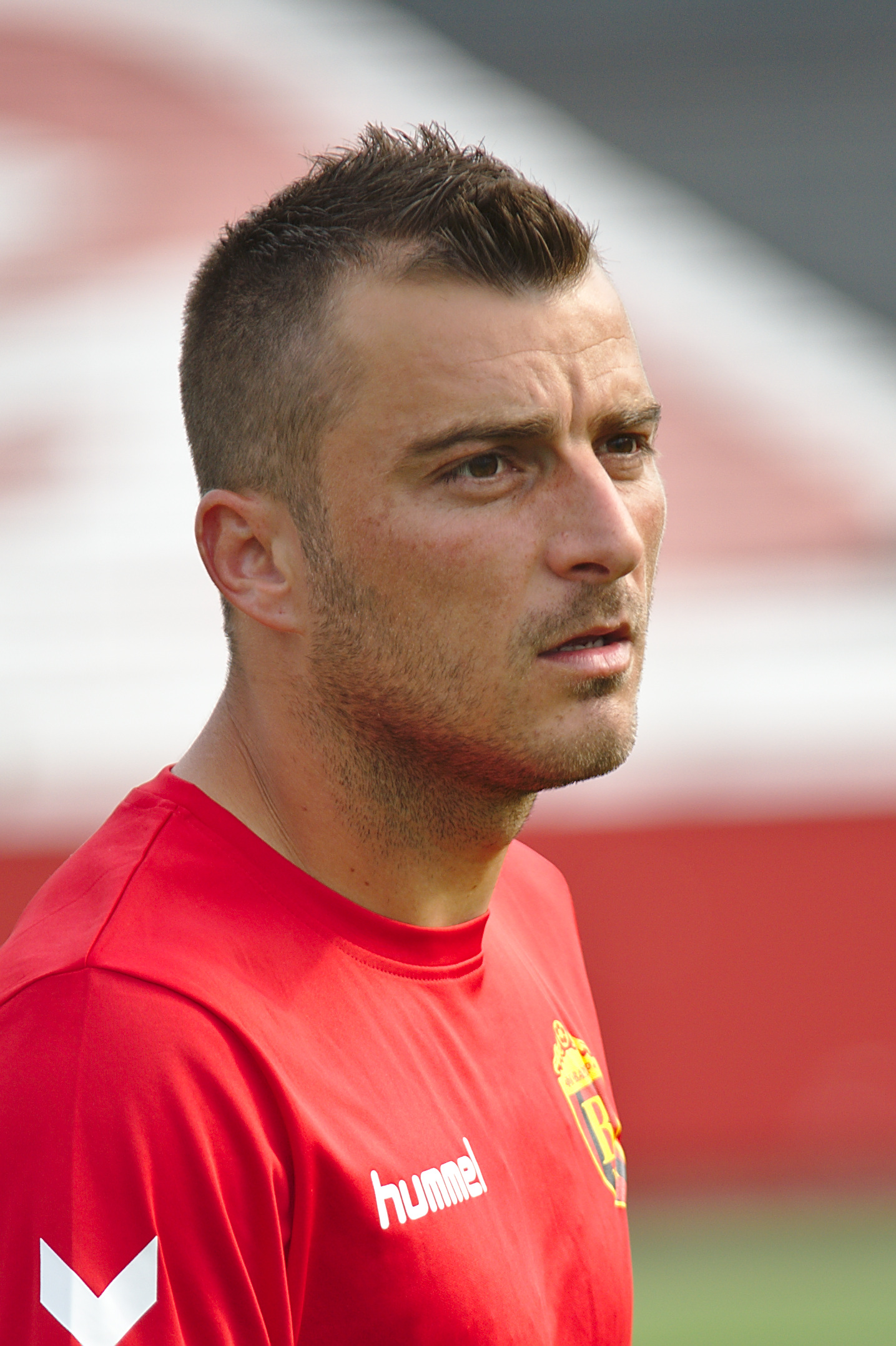

Personal information
- Full name: Dejan Blazhevski
- Date of birth: 6 December 1985 (age 40)
- Place of birth: Skopje, SR Macedonia, SFR Yugoslavia
- Height: 1.72 m (5 ft 8 in)
- Position: Winger

Team information
- Current team: Vardar
- Number: 10

Senior career*
| Years | Team | Apps | (Gls) |
| 2006–2008 | Pelister | 57 | (12) |
| 2008–2010 | Agrotikos Asteras | 64 | (8) |
| 2010–2011 | Veria | 29 | (2) |
| 2011–2012 | Pierikos | 34 | (2) |
| 2012–2014 | Turnovo | 50 | (37) |
| 2014 | Khazar Lankaran | 19 | (3) |
| 2015–2018 | Vardar | 88 | (37) |
| 2018 | Tirana | 10 | (3) |
| 2019 | Rabotnički | 13 | (1) |
| 2019–2020 | Makedonija GP | 16 | (2) |
| 2020–2022 | Vardar | 47 | (8) |

International career
| 2012–2015 | Macedonia | 4 | (1) |
- * Club domestic league appearances and goals as of 14 July 2022

Dejan Blazhevski (Macedonian: Дејан Блажевски; born 6 December 1985) is a Macedonian professional footballer who plays as a left winger for FK Vardar.

== Club career ==
Blaževski had previously played for clubs such as Pelister, Vardar, Skopje, Bregalnica Delčevo and in Greece for Agrotikos Asteras.

In January 2014, Blaževski moved to Azerbaijan Premier League team Khazar Lankaran on an 18-month contract. In December 2014, Blaževski left Khazar Lankaran, going on to sign for FK Vardar.

On 24 June 2018, Tirana announced to have signed Blazhevski on a one-year contract with an option to renew. He made his official debut on 18 August in the 1–0 home loss to Kamza. He scored his first league goal on 16 September in the 3–1 win over Luftëtari Gjirokastër. It was Tirana's first top flight win in 484 days. Later on 3 October, he scored a brace in a 3–2 comeback win at Kastrioti Krujë to give Tirana its first away win since February 2016.

In August 2019, Blazhevski joined FK Makedonija Gjorče Petrov.

== International career ==
Blaževski made his senior debut on 14 November 2012 in a friendly against Slovenia, as Macedonia won 3–2. His first goal came one month later in another friendly, a 1–4 away defeat to Poland.

== Career statistics ==
=== Club ===
As of 11 December 2014

| Season | Club | Division | League | | Cup | | Europe | | Total | |
| Season | Club | Division | Apps | Goals | Apps | Goals | Apps | Goals | Apps | Goals |
|---|---|---|---|---|---|---|---|---|---|---|
| 2006–07 | Pelister | 1. MFL | 28 | 6 | | | - | | 28 | 6 |
| 2007–08 | Pelister | 1. MFL | 27 | 6 | | | - | | 27 | 6 |
| 2008–09 | Pelister | 1. MFL | 2 | 0 | | | - | | 2 | 0 |
| 2008–09 | Agrotikos Asteras | Football League | 32 | 4 | | | - | | 32 | 4 |
| 2009–10 | Agrotikos Asteras | Football League | 31 | 5 | | | - | | 31 | 5 |
| 2010–11 | Veria | Football League | 29 | 2 | 1 | 0 | - | | 30 | 2 |
| 2011–12 | Pierikos | Football League | 31 | 3 | 1 | 0 | - | | 32 | 3 |
| 2012–13 | Turnovo | 1. MFL | 32 | 18 | | | - | | 32 | 18 |
| 2013–14 | Turnovo | 1. MFL | 18 | 19 | | | - | | 18 | 19 |
| 2013–14 | Khazar Lankaran | Azerbaijan Premier League | 14 | 2 | 2 | 0 | 0 | 0 | 16 | 2 |
| 2014–15 | Khazar Lankaran | Azerbaijan Premier League | 5 | 1 | 0 | 0 | - | | 5 | 1 |
| Total | Macedonia | | 107 | 49 | | | - | | 107 | 49 |
| Total | Greece | | 123 | 14 | 2 | 0 | - | | 125 | 14 |
| Total | Azerbaijan | | 19 | 3 | 2 | 0 | 0 | 0 | 21 | 3 |
| Career total | | | 249 | 66 | 4 | 0 | 0 | 0 | 253 | 66 |

=== International ===
As of 30 March 2015

Appearances and goals by national team and year
| National team | Year | Apps | Goals |
|---|---|---|---|
| Macedonia | 2012 | 2 | 1 |
| Macedonia | 2015 | 2 | 0 |
| Total | | 4 | 1 |

=== International goals ===
Scores and results list Macedonia's goal tally first.

| # | Date | Venue | Opponent | Score | Result | Competition |
|---|---|---|---|---|---|---|
| 1. | 14 December 2012 | Mardan Sports Complex, Aksu | Poland | 1–4 | 1–4 | Friendly |

== Honours ==
=== Club ===
Vardar

- Macedonian First Football League: 2014–15, 2015–16, 2016–17

=== Individual ===
- Macedonian First Football League top goalscorer: 2013–14
