= Boško Stupić =

Bosnian footballer (born 1984)

Personal information
- Date of birth: 27 June 1984 (age 42)
- Place of birth: Mostar, SFR Yugoslavia
- Height: 1.91 m (6 ft 3 in)
- Position: Striker

Team information
- Current team: Kyran

Youth career
- Leotar

Senior career*
Years	Team	Apps	(Gls)
2001–2005	Leotar	60	(15)
2005–2006	Mladenovac	15	(7)
2006–2009	Sileks	83	(42)
2009	Vardar	12	(6)
2010	Istra 1961	23	(2)
2011	Olimpik Sarajevo	8	(0)
2011–2013	Rabotnički	24	(5)
2013–2014	Bregalnica Štip	19	(0)
2014	Pelister	17	(6)
2015	Bregalnica Štip	14	(3)
2015	Novi Pazar	0	(0)
2016	Mladost Podgorica	4	(0)
2016–2018	Kyzylzhar	51	(26)
2018	Kyran		
- * Club domestic league appearances and goals

Boško Stupić (Serbian Cyrillic: Бошко Ступић; born 27 June 1984) is a Bosnian footballer who plays for Kyran in the Kazakhstan First League.

== Club career ==
Born in Mostar, SR Bosnia and Herzegovina, he has played for Bosnian club FK Leotar, FK Mladost Velika Obarska, FK Hercegovac Bileća, Serbian OFK Mladenovac and Macedonian clubs FK Sileks FK Vardar, FK Rabotnički and FK Pelister. In July 2015 he signed with FK Novi Pazar.
