= Carev Dvor =

Carev Dvor Царев Двор
- Village
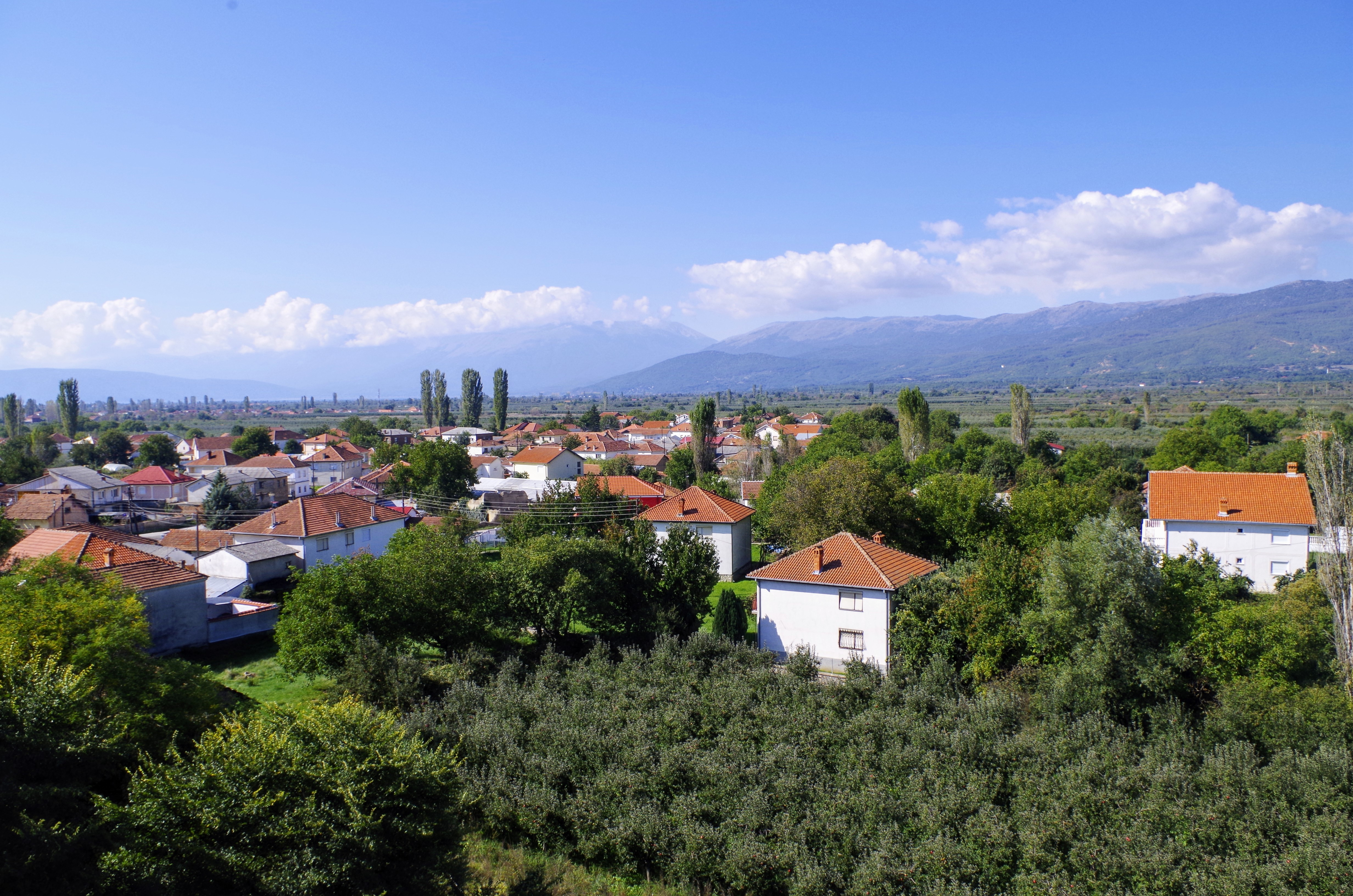

- Location within North Macedonia
- Coordinates: 41°02′35″N 21°0′26″E
- Country: North Macedonia
- Region: Pelagonia
- Municipality: Resen

Population (2002)
  - Total: 605
- Time zone: UTC+1 (CET)
  - Summer (DST): UTC+2 (CEST)
- Area code: +389
- Car plates: RE

Carev Dvor (Macedonian: Царев Двор, meaning Emperor's Court; Turkish: Kayser Sarayi) is a village in Resen Municipality in North Macedonia, roughly 5 kilometres (3.1 mi) from the municipal centre of Resen. It has 605 residents.

== Demographics ==
Carev Dvor is inhabited by Orthodox Macedonians and Muslim Turks. The total population of Carev Dvor has decreased more than half from the 1961 census to the most recent one in 2002. The village has also seen its proportion of Turkish residents drop significantly.

Ethnic group	census 1961		census 1971		census 1981		census 1991		census 1994		census 2002	
Ethnic group	Number	%	Number	%	Number	%	Number	%	Number	%	Number	%
Macedonians	951	72.9	836	72.6	875	71.0	814	76.3	612	86.4	520	86.0
Albanians	7	0.5	5	0.4	2	0.2	0	0.0	1	0.1	0	0.0
Turks	344	26.4	308	26.7	343	27.8	124	11.6	95	13.4	81	13.4
Serbs	1	0.1	1	0.1	4	0.3	0	0.0	0	0.0	0	0.0
others	0	0.0	2	0.2	9	0.7	129	12.1	0	0.0	4	0.7
Total	1,303		1,152		1,233		1,067		708		605	

== Sports ==
The village is also home to FK Mladost football club, formerly of the First Macedonian Football League.

== People from Carev Dvor ==
- Cvetko Uzunovski (1916 - 1993), communist and partizan
- Kiril of Polog and Kumanovo (1934 - 2013), metropolitan of the Diocese of Polog and Kumanovo of the Macedonian Orthodox Church - Ohrid Archbishopric
