= Blazhe Ilijoski =

Macedonian footballer

Personal information
- Full name: Blazhe Ilijoski; Блаже Илијоски
- Date of birth: 9 July 1984 (age 42)
- Place of birth: Skopje, SFR Yugoslavia (present-day North Macedonia)
- Height: 1.84 m (6 ft 0 in)
- Position: Forward

Senior career*
Years	Team	Apps	(Gls)
2002–2006	Rabotnichki	109	(47)
2006–2007	Incheon United	12	(3)
2007–2008	Rabotnichki	21	(10)
2009–2010	Metalurg	35	(15)
2010	Gangwon	7	(1)
2011–2012	Metalurg	17	(11)
2012	Braşov	12	(6)
2012	Rapid București	11	(2)
2013	Rabotnichki	10	(8)
2013	FC Gifu	16	(2)
2014	Rabotnichki	10	(8)
2014	Bangkok Glass	14	(8)
2015	Rabotnichki	32	(21)
2016	Kelantan	20	(14)
2017	Pelister	24	(9)
2018	Shkupi	26	(14)
2019	Rabotnichki	19	(2)

International career
2001–2003	Macedonia U-19	6	(1)
2003–2005	Macedonia U-21	10	(1)
2005–2015	Macedonia	14	(1)
- * Club domestic league appearances and goals

Blazhe Ilijoski (Macedonian: Блаже Илијоски), nicknamed Bazhe (born 9 July 1984) is a Macedonian football player who plays as a forward.

== Club career ==
=== FC Gifu ===
On 25 July 2013, Ilijoski signed for J2 League club FC Gifu.

=== Bangkok Glass ===
On 9 July 2014 Ilijoski score 2 goals on his debut with Bangkok Glass FC in ThaiCom FA Cup 1/8 round over Buriram United

=== Kelantan FA ===
On 27 January 2016, Ilijoski was revealed as Malaysia Super League side, Kelantan FA new signing. On 13 February 2015 Ilijoski made his debut as a professional player at Malaysia Super League against Perak TBG but the results ended in a 0–0 draw. He scored his first goal at minute 83 against UKM F.C. at Malaysia FA Cup competition on 20 February 2016. He scored his first goal in Malaysia Super League against Sarawak FA which ended in 2–2 draw with him scoring both the goal and becoming the man of the match on 26 February 2016. He gain his first hat-trick in a league match against Terengganu FA which resulted in 1–6 victory for the away team (Kelantan FA) with him scoring 4 of them with the rest each scored by Wander Luiz and Wan Zack Haikal.

== Malaysia Super League statistics ==
Club	Season	Super League		FA Cup		League Cup		Others		Total
Club	Season	App	Goals	App	Goals	App	Goals	App	Goals	App	Goals
Kelantan FA (Malaysia Super League)	2016	19	14	2	1	5	1	–	–	26	16
Kelantan FA (Malaysia Super League)	Club Total	19	14	2	1	5	1	–	–	26	16
Career totals		19	14	2	1	5	1	–	–	26	16
Last updated 22 October 2016

== International career ==
He made his senior debut for Macedonia in a November 2005 friendly match against Liechtenstein, in which he immediately scored a goal, and has earned a total of 14 caps, scoring 1 goal. His final international was a November 2015 friendly against Lebanon.

== Career statistics ==
=== International ===
Appearances and goals by national team and year
National team	Year	Apps	Goals
Macedonia	2005	1	1
Macedonia	2006	1	0
Macedonia	2007	–	
Macedonia	2008	–	
Macedonia	2009	–	
Macedonia	2010	4	0
Macedonia	2011	–	
Macedonia	2012	–	
Macedonia	2013	–	
Macedonia	2014	4	0
Macedonia	2015	4	1
Total		14	1

Scores and results list Macedonia's goal tally first, score column indicates score after each Ilijoski goal.

List of international goals scored by Blahze Ilijoski
No.	Date	Venue	Opponent	Score	Result	Competition
1	12 November 2005	Rheinpark Stadion, Vaduz, Liechtenstein	Liechtenstein	2–1	2–1	Friendly

== Honours ==
Rabotnički

- Macedonian First League: 2004–05, 2005–06, 2007–08, 2013–14
- Macedonian Football Cup: 2007–08, 2008–09, 2013–14, 2014–15

Metalurg Skopje

- Macedonian Football Cup: 2010–11

Bangkok Glass F.C.

- Thai FA Cup: 2014

Pelister

- Macedonian Football Cup: 2016–17
