= Vitaminka =

Macedonian food processing company

Vitaminka AD Prilep

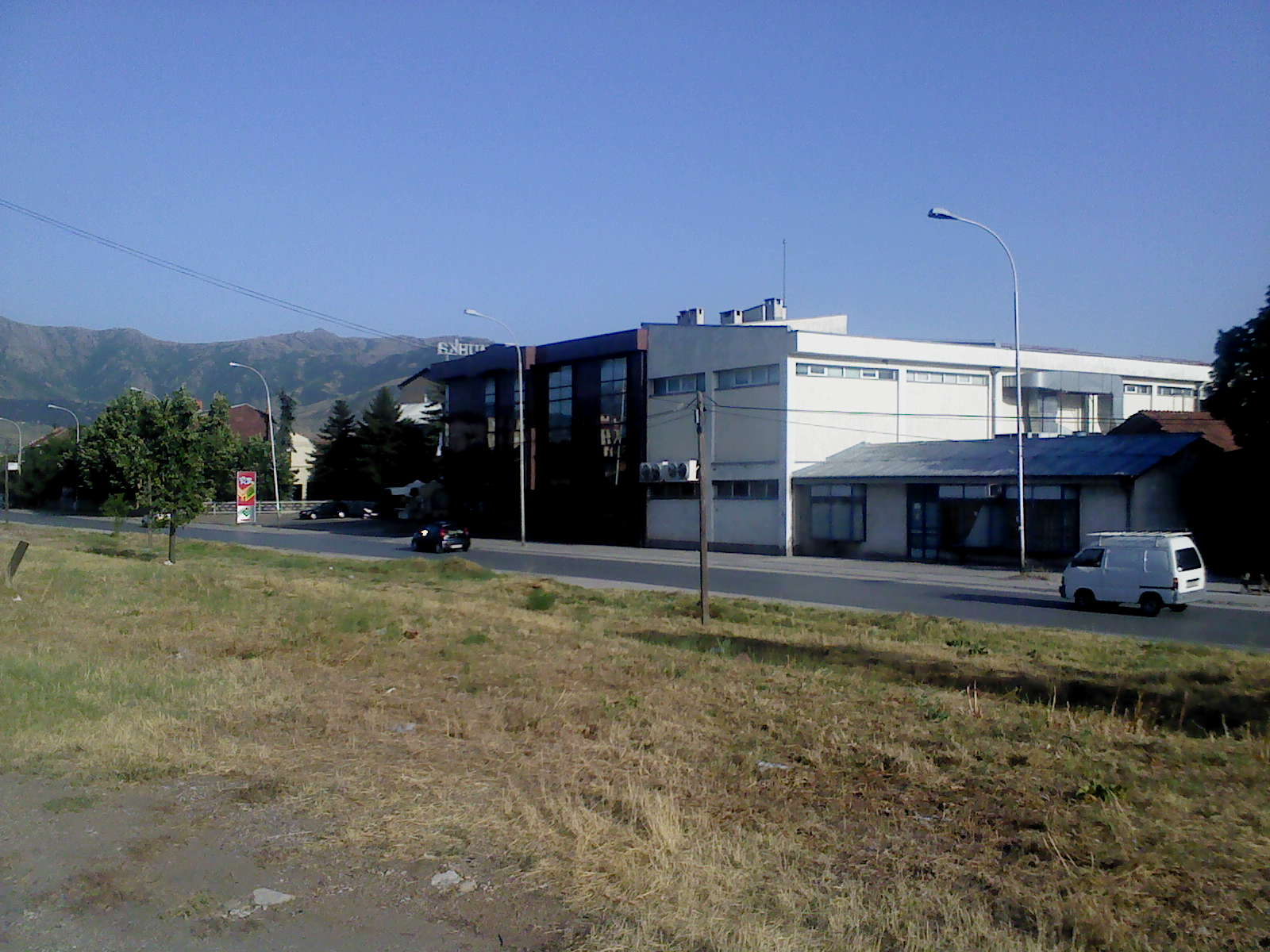
- Vitaminka factory in Prilep
- Native name: Витаминка АД Прилеп
- Company type: Private
- Industry: Food processing
- Headquarters: Prilep, North Macedonia
- Area served: North Macedonia and 30 countries
- Key people: Simon Naumoski (President); Sašo Naumoski (CEO)
- Revenue: ▲MKD 4,611,069 (2025); MKD 3,689,16 (2024)
- Website: https://vitaminka.company

Vitaminka AD Prilep, commonly known as Vitaminka, is a Macedonian food processing company headquartered in Prilep, North Macedonia. Founded in 1956, it has grown from a ground red pepper producer to a key regional player. The company produces a variety of snacks, spices, sauces, beverages and confectionery. As a joint-stock company, it is considered one of the largest food processing companies in the country, as well as a prominent competitor in its region.

== History ==
Vitaminka was initially established in 1956 in the Socialist Republic of Macedonia as a state-owned producer of ground red pepper. In 1974, the company expanded its product portfolio to include a broader range of food categories.

In 1987 and early 1988, Vitaminka further expanded its manufacturing capacities.

Following the dissolution of Yugoslavia in 1991, Vitaminka's revenue declined to approximately one-quarter of its previous annual level.

In 2007, the European Bank for Reconstruction and Development (EBRD) began investing in Vitaminka, starting with a €4 million loan, followed by another €2 million in 2016 to support infrastructure development.

Vitaminka was one of the eleven companies that founded Pakomak DOO Skopje, a non-profit packaging waste management organization formed on December 3, 2010.

In February 2018, Vitaminka acquired Brilijant, a cooking oil brand headquartered in Štip.

During the COVID-19 pandemic, Vitaminka set aside a budget of MKD 3.5 million as a response to the crisis, with most of the budget directed to the Ministry of Health and to non-governmental and humanitarian organizations for helping vulnerable groups of citizens.

== Products ==
Vitaminka produces over 400 packaging variants across several food categories, including snacks, spices, sauces, beverages and confectionery. Approximately 45% of Vitaminka's products are exported to over 30 countries. The company also holds an ISO certified Halal standard.

Notable brands include:

- Stobi Flips, a corn based, gluten-free snack and one of the company's best-known products
- Brilijant, a cooking oil brand based in Štip
- Vitaminka Ketchup, a branded line of tomato ketchup
- Dafinka, a spice made of various dried vegetables
- Atlantis, a chocolate sea shells brand
- Choco Stobi, chocolate-coated cereals
- Cevitana, an instant vitamin powder drink
- Vitanez, a mayonnaise brand

== Awards ==
In 2014, the Government of North Macedonia awarded Vitaminka the statuette for best social practices in the category of "Employee relations".

In 2024, Vitaminka was nominated for the "Most Desired Employer in Food Production" award by Vrabotuvanje.com.mk.
