= Saško Pandev =

Macedonian football player (born 1987)

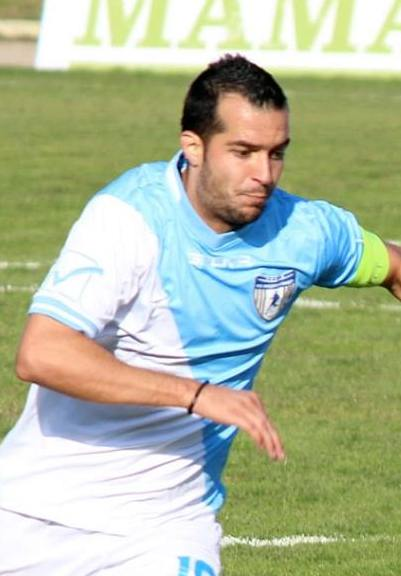

Personal information
- Date of birth: 1 May 1987 (age 39)
- Place of birth: Strumica, Macedonia
- Height: 1.88 m (6 ft 2 in)
- Position: Striker

Youth career
- Belasica

Senior career*
Years	Team	Apps	(Gls)
2003–2005	Belasica	57	(13)
2005–2010	Dinamo Zagreb	10	(1)
2007	→ Inter Zaprešić (loan)	14	(0)
2008	→ Međimurje (loan)	4	(0)
2009	→ Rabotnički (loan)	5	(1)
2009–2010	→ Turnovo (loan)	29	(5)
2010–2011	Muğan	16	(0)
2011	Turnovo	15	(0)
2012–2013	Renova	32	(5)
2013–2016	Turnovo	81	(24)
2016–2023	Akademija Pandev	147	(16)

International career
2004–2009	Macedonia U21	11	(2)
- * Club domestic league appearances and goals

Saško Pandev (Macedonian: Сашко Пандев, born 1 May 1987) is a Macedonian football player who is playing as a striker.

== Club career ==
He is currently playing for Horizont Turnovo. He started playing football in Belasica. He made his debut for Belasica, in May 2003. He played 57 games and he scored 13 goals for Belasica. In November 2005, he moved in Dinamo Zagreb. He made his Croatian First League debut on 14 October 2006 as a late substitute in Dinamo Zagreb's 4–1 home victory over NK Varteks and scored his first league goal for the club in their 3–2 away victory over Međimurje on 9 December 2006, which was also his first match in Dinamo's starting line-up. One week before the match against Međimurje, he assisted in both goals for Dinamo's 2–1 victory in a Zagreb derby against NK Zagreb, which eventually earned him his first start for Dinamo in a league match. He spent most of his career in Strumica. He played for Belasica (57 games), Horizont Turnovo (132 games) and Akademija Pandev (147 games). He won the Macedonian cup in 2009 with Rabotnichki, 2012 with Renova and 2019 with Akademija Pandev. He briefly played for Rabotnicki, Renova Tetovo and Mugan Azerbaijan. Although he played in top flight teams competing for titles and cups he didn't win many trophies. In his youth career he played for the Macedonian under 21 team.

== Personal life ==
Saško Pandev is the younger brother of retired Macedonian football international Goran Pandev.

== Honours ==
- Macedonian Football Cup (3)

2009 (Rabotnicki), 2012 (Renova),2019 (Akademija Pandev)
