= Martin Hristov (footballer, born 1997) =

Macedonian footballer

Personal information
- Full name: Martin Hristov; Мартин Христов
- Date of birth: 31 January 1997 (age 29)
- Place of birth: Skopje, Republic of Macedonia
- Height: 1.87 m (6 ft 1 1/2 in)
- Position: Striker

Youth career
- 2003–2007: Vardar
- 2007–2013: Makedonija

Senior career*
Years	Team	Apps	(Gls)
2013–2014	Makedonija	1	(0)
2014	Teteks	11	(0)
2015	Donji Srem	8	(0)
2015–2016	Euromilk GL		
2016	Koprivnica		
2017	Skopje		
2017-2018	Makedonija		
2018–2019	Skopje		

International career^{‡}
2013	Macedonia U-17	1	(0)
2014–	Macedonia U-18	6	(2)
- * Club domestic league appearances and goals as of 19 May 2015 ‡ National team caps and goals as of 6 April 2015

Martin Hristov (Macedonian: Мартин Христов; born 31 January 1997) is a Macedonian footballer who plays for FK Donji Srem in Serbian SuperLiga, and the Macedonia national under-19 football team as a striker.

== Club career ==
He played with FK Makedonija Gjorče Petrov and FK Teteks in the Macedonian First Football League. During the winter break of the 2014–15 season he moved to Serbian side FK Donji Srem. He made his debut in the 2014–15 Serbian SuperLiga on 21 February 2015 in the round 16 against Borac Čačak.

== International career ==
Martin Hristov played for the Macedonian U-17 team.
