= Cvetan Čurlinov =

Macedonian footballer

Personal information
- Date of birth: 24 July 1986 (age 40)
- Place of birth: Gevgelija, SFR Yugoslavia
- Height: 1.87 m (6 ft 1 1/2 in)
- Position: Forward

Team information
- Current team: FC Aegeri

Youth career
- Vardarski

Senior career*
Years	Team	Apps	(Gls)
2004–2005	Pobeda Prilep	3	(0)
2005–2006	Makedonija GP	14	(4)
2006–2007	Kalamata	7	(0)
2007–2008	Žalgiris Vilnius	15	(10)
2008	FK Baku	6	(1)
2009	Kožuf Gevgelija	13	(7)
2009	Pobeda Prilep	11	(4)
2010–2011	Horizont Turnovo	36	(11)
2011–2013	Metalurg Skopje	54	(16)
2013	Aiginiakos	7	(1)
2014	Horizont Turnovo	14	(2)
2014	Rabotnički	9	(2)
2015	Teteks		
2015–2016	Kožuf Miravci	14	(4)
2016–2017	Wangen bei Olten		
2017–2018	FC Rotkreuz		
2018–2019	Kožuf Gevgelija		
2020–2021	FC Rotkreuz		
2021–	FC Aegeri		

International career
2006–2007	Macedonia U21	4	(0)
- * Club domestic league appearances and goals as of 10 November 2014

Cvetan Čurlinov (Macedonian: Цветан Чурлинов; born 24 July 1986) is a Macedonian footballer who plays for FC Aegeri as a forward.

== Career ==
Čurlinov previously played for Kalamata where he made his debut in the Greek Beta Ethniki coming on as a second-half substitute against Kallithea on 24 September 2006. He also had a brief spell with FK Žalgiris Vilnius during the 2007 season. The forward joined in January 2010 from FK Pobeda to Macedonian First League rival FK Horizont Turnovo.

In August 2011, he signed a 2-year contract with FK Metalurg Skopje.
