= FK Mladost Carev Dvor =

Mladost Carev Dvor
- Full name: Fudbalski Klub Mladost Carev Dvor
- Founded: 1930; 95 years ago
- Dissolved: 2016; 9 years ago
- Ground: Gradski stadion Resen
- Capacity: 1,500
- 2015–16: Macedonian First League, 10th (relegated)
Home colours	Away colours

FK Mladost Carev Dvor (Macedonian: ФК Младост Царев Двор) is a football club based in the village of Carev Dvor near Resen, North Macedonia. They recently played in the Macedonian First League.

== History ==
The club was founded in 1930.

After promotion to the Macedonian Second League in 2014, in 2015 the club won promotion to the Macedonian First League for the first time in his history, but in the following season, Mladost was relegated after taking the last place in the league. But that was not the end of their problems, because the club withdrew from the Second League due to financial problems.

== Honours ==
(North Macedonia) Macedonian Second League:

- Runners-up (1): 2014–15
