= Stadion Kukuš =

Coordinates: 41°26′15″N 22°46′8″E

Kukuš Stadium Стадион Кукуш
- Interactive map of Kukuš Stadium; Стадион Кукуш
- Location: Strumica, North Macedonia
- Owner: FK Horizont Turnovo
- Capacity: 1,500
- Field size: 105 x 68 meters
- Surface: Grass

Tenants
- FK Horizont Turnovo; FK Brera Strumica

Kukus Stadium (Macedonian: Стадион Кукуш) is a multi-purpose stadium in Strumica, North Macedonia. It is used mostly for football matches and is currently the home stadium of FK Horizont Turnovo and FC AP Brera Strumica. The stadium holds 1,500 people.
