= Turnovo, North Macedonia =

Turnovo Турново
- Village
- Location within North Macedonia
- Country: North Macedonia
- Region: Southeastern
- Municipality: Bosilovo
- Elevation: 199 m (653 ft)

Population (2002)
  - Total: 941
- Time zone: UTC+1 (CET)
  - Summer (DST): UTC+2 (CEST)
- Postal code: 2433
- Car plates: SR
- Website: .

Turnovo (Macedonian: Турново) is a village in the municipality of Bosilovo, North Macedonia.

== Demographics ==
According to the 2002 census, the village had a total of 941 inhabitants. Ethnic groups in the village include:

- Macedonians 941

As of 2021, the village of Turnovo has 634 inhabitants and the ethnic composition was the following:

- Macedonians – 584
- others – 3
- Person without Data - 47

== Sports ==
Local football club FK Horizont have finished runners-up in the 2013–14 Macedonian First Football League and qualified for the UEFA Europa League twice. They play their home games in neighboring Strumica however.

== See also ==
- Bosilovo Municipality
- Strumica
- Bosilovo
