= KF Shkupi =

Macedonian professional football club

Shkupi
- Full name: Klubi Futbollistik Shkupi
- Nicknames: Pëllumbat (Pigeons); Shvercerat (Smugglers)
- Short name: Shkupi
- Founded: 1927; 99 years ago Merged in 2012; 14 years ago
- Ground: Čair Stadium
- Capacity: 4,500
- Owner: Bekim Baftjari
- Chairman: Bekim Baftjari
- Manager: Minas Osmani
- League: Macedonian Second Football League
- 2025–26: Macedonian First Football League, 12 of 12 (relegated)
- Website: fcshkupi.com
Home colours	Away colours	Third colours

FC Shkupi (Macedonian: Фудбалски Клуб Шкупи, romanized: Fudbalski Klub Škupi, Albanian: Klubi Futbollistik Shkupi) is a professional football club based in Čair, Skopje, North Macedonia. The club competes in the Macedonian Second Football League, the second highest tier of football in the country. Historically a dominant force in the modern era, Shkupi achieved a historic milestone by winning the league title in the 2021–22 season and subsequently representing North Macedonia in the UEFA Champions League and UEFA Europa League qualifying rounds.

As of February 2026, the club is navigating a period of severe administrative and competitive decline. This downturn followed the resignation of long-term president and primary sponsor Olgun Aydın in November 2024, who cited dissatisfaction with officiating and league governance as reasons for his departure. The ensuing financial instability led to a mass exodus of first-team players and coaching staff. By the mid-point of the 2025–26 season, Shkupi occupied the bottom of the league table, having secured only one point from 19 matches.

The club's struggles were further compounded by infrastructure challenges. Following the Football Federation of Macedonia's (FFM) mandatory implementation of VAR technology for all top-flight matches, the club's home ground, Čair Stadium, was declared ineligible due to technical deficiencies. This resulted in a series of forfeited matches and forced the team to play home fixtures at alternative venues, deepening the club's logistical and financial crisis.

== History ==
FC Shkupi traces its origins to 1927, when it was established as KF Zafer by football enthusiasts in the Čair neighborhood of Skopje. During the interwar period, the club competed in the Skopje League and regional divisions of the Kingdom of Yugoslavia, serving as a gathering point for various ethnic minorities, particularly the Albanian and Torbesh communities. Following World War II, the Yugoslav authorities renamed the club Sloga (meaning "United" or "Concord"). For several decades, the team played in the Macedonian Republic League, which functioned as a lower tier within the Yugoslav football league system.

In 1989, the club entered a period of significant growth following the arrival of sponsor Rafet Muminović and his company, Jugomagnat, leading to the name change to FK Sloga Jugomagnat. This era saw the club become a dominant force in the newly independent Macedonia, winning three consecutive league titles between 1999 and 2001. However, following the withdrawal of its primary sponsor in 2005, the club suffered from financial instability and was eventually suspended from the Macedonian First Football League in 2009.

In 2012, the club was administratively refounded through a merger with the lower-division FC Albarsa to form KF Shkupi. While the Football Federation of Macedonia (FFM) maintains that Shkupi is not the legal successor to Sloga Jugomagnat and keeps their records separate, the club's management and its primary supporter group, the Shvercerat, recognize the 1927 foundation as their official start date.

Following their return to the Macedonian First Football League, Shkupi established themselves as a consistent contender, qualifying for the UEFA Europa League in the 2017–18 season after finishing fourth. The club reached a historic milestone in the 2021–22 season, securing their first modern league title under manager Goce Sedloski with four matches remaining in the campaign. This success led to a notable 2022–23 European run, where they competed in the UEFA Champions League qualifiers, notably holding GNK Dinamo Zagreb to a 2–2 draw at the Stadion Maksimir.

However, the 2025–26 season was marked by a severe administrative and infrastructure crisis. Following the Football Federation of Macedonia's (FFM) mandatory implementation of VAR technology for all top-flight matches, the club's home ground, Čair Stadium, was deemed ineligible due to its failure to meet technical and safety requirements. The resulting inability to secure a sanctioned alternative venue led to a series of forfeited matches and complex legal disputes over venue availability. By February 2026, Shkupi occupied the bottom of the league table, having secured only one point in its first 18 matches amid ongoing financial deficits and a significant loss of first-team personnel.

== Supporters ==
On 13 February 2011, a large gathering of Vardar supporters, Komiti Skopje, congregated at the Skopje Fortress to protect a construction site on the grounds of the fortress. A brawl with ethnic Albanians, a lot being a part of the Shkupi supporters “Shvercerat”, ensued and the construction was called off.

The Shvercerat are known for taking rival team supporters' banners. They have succeeded in taking the Kratovo banner of Sileks, the Vojvodi banner of Teteks, Komiti Zapad banner of Vardar, Vinari banner of Vardar Negotino, Prilep banner of Pobeda, Green Front and BFC Hooligans banners of Pelister.

In 2018, three members of Shvercerat saw Komiti member, Nikola Sazdovski, late at night. They then proceeded to beat him to death. Two were sentenced to 19 years in prison in 2019, while the third member is a fugitive.

In 2023, an incident occurred during a Conference League qualifier match, Levski Sofia fans sung chants which provoked the fans of Shkupi to a brawl after the match. 21 people (19 Bulgarian) were arrested and 1 man was stabbed in the stomach. Shkupi fans were banned from attending the second leg in Sofia.

In late 2025 and early 2026, the relationship between the supporters and the club's management deteriorated significantly. On 10 February 2026, Shvercerat issued an official statement announcing an indefinite boycott of all organized activities and matches. The group cited a "deep crisis" within the club and demanded a transparent transfer of ownership from Yasin Konyaalli to a new management structure, expressing distrust toward the "acting" leadership and the reappearance of controversial figures from previous seasons. This boycott followed a period of poor performance where the team sat at the bottom of the Macedonian First Football League table with only one point midway through the 2025–26 season.

Disciplinary issues and violence have continued to mark the group's activities. On 30 November 2025, following a match against Vardar at the FFM "Petar Miloševski" complex, seven individuals were detained by the Ministry of Interior for public order violations, including the use of pyrotechnics and aggressive behavior toward police officers. Earlier in the 2025 season, the club suffered an official 0–3 forfeit defeat against FK Sileks because they were unable to secure a home stadium that met the newly mandatory VAR technology requirements, a situation that further fueled supporter frustration.

Despite these tensions, the club attempted to modernize its operations by signing a strategic cooperation agreement with the "Royal Business Council" from the United Arab Emirates on 5 May 2025, aimed at improving the club's infrastructure and academy development.

== Honours ==
- (North Macedonia) Macedonian First League:
  - Winners (1): 2021–22
  - Runners-up (2): 2020–21, 2022–23
- (North Macedonia) Macedonian Second League:
  - Winners (1): 2014–15
- (North Macedonia) Macedonian Third League:
  - Winners (1): 2012–13

== Crest and colours ==
The logo of Shkupi consists of a shield-shaped emblem primarily colored in blue and white, symbolizing the team’s identity and heritage. At the top of the shield, the words “Football Club SHKUPI” are prominently displayed, representing the club’s official name.

The central area features the initials “SH” surrounded by vertical stripes, which add a sense of structure and balance. Below the initials, the year “1927” is inscribed, marking the club’s foundation and highlighting its long-standing history in football.

The bottom section of the logo contains a stylized depiction of a football, emphasizing the sport the club represents. Flanking the shield on both sides are laurel branches, a traditional symbol of victory and achievement, underscoring the club’s aspirations and successes.

== Recent seasons ==
Season	League									Macedonian Cup	European competitions		
Season	Division	Pos	P	W	D	L	F	A	Pts	Macedonian Cup	UCL	UEL	UCL
2012–13	3. MFL North	1st ↑	28	23	4	1	80	26	73	~~N/A.~~	DNQ		
2013–14	2. MFL	4th	29	16	4	9	56	31	52	R1	DNQ		
2014–15	2. MFL	1st ↑	27	16	5	6	44	19	53	R2	DNQ		
2015–16	1. MFL	6th	32	9	11	12	29	34	38	R2	DNQ		
2016–17	1. MFL	8th	36	8	13	15	27	39	37	QF	DNQ		
2017–18	1. MFL	4th	36	13	12	11	51	46	51	R2	DNQ		
2018–19	1. MFL	4th	36	13	9	14	40	42	48	R1	—	QR1	—
2019–20^{1}	1. MFL	5th	23	7	8	8	28	28	29	~~N/A.~~	—	QR1	—
2020–21	1. MFL	2nd	33	16	11	6	41	24	59	QF	—	QR1	—
2021–22	1. MFL	1st	33	23	7	3	66	21	76	QF	—	—	QR2
2022–23	1. MFL	2nd	30	17	7	6	62	27	58	QF	QR2	QR3	PO
2023–24	1. MFL	3rd	33	17	11	5	42	23	62	SF	—	—	QR2
2024–25	1. MFL	7th	33	10	8	15	47	47	38	R2	DNQ		
2025–26	1. MFL	12th ↓	33	0	1	32	15	130	1	R2	DNQ		

^{1}The 2019–20 season was abandoned due to the COVID-19 pandemic in North Macedonia.

== Players ==
=== Current squad ===
As of 1 December 2025

Note: Flags indicate national team as defined under FIFA eligibility rules; some limited exceptions apply. Players may hold more than one non-FIFA nationality.

No.	Pos.	Nation	Player
2	DF	MKD	Venis Enuz
4	DF	KOS	Rigon Spahiu
6	MF	KOS	Adonis Milaj
7	MF	POR	Luís Ribeiro
9	MF	MKD	Amar Emurli
10	FW	MKD	Suhejlj Muharem (captain)
11	FW	MKD	Ariton Mehmedi
13	GK	MKD	Sefer Musliu
14	FW	MKD	Zani Nazifi
15	MF	MKD	Altin Ziberi
16	MF	CAN	Lorik Sadiku
17	FW	GER	Malik Hayvali
18	DF	ALB	Neshat Murati

No.	Pos.	Nation	Player
19	DF	MKD	Emre Kadri
21	MF	MKD	Xhihan Adili
23	DF	MKD	Andrej Richkov
27	DF	MKD	Asan Rifadov
29	MF	MKD	Blerim Mustafa
30	FW	MKD	Mario Stankovski
31	GK	MKD	Amar Meliqi
33	DF	MKD	Marko Ristov
34	FW	MKD	Ardit Destani
38	MF	TUR	Ahmet Öztürk
89	FW	MKD	Erion Shuku
99	GK	GER	Maximilian Grote

=== Youth players ===
Players from the U19 Youth Team that have been summoned with the first team in the current season.
Note: Flags indicate national team as defined under FIFA eligibility rules; some limited exceptions apply. Players may hold more than one non-FIFA nationality.

No.	Pos.	Nation	Player
5	DF	MKD	Anes Bajrami
8	MF	MKD	Fisnik Ismani
26	DF	MKD	Endrit Rustemi
41	MF	MKD	Jane Cvetkov
97	MF	MKD	Endrit Akiku

=== Retired numbers ===
Note: Flags indicate national team as defined under FIFA eligibility rules; some limited exceptions apply. Players may hold more than one non-FIFA nationality.

No.	Pos.	Nation	Player
77	MF	MKD	Andrej Lazarov (2025 – posthumous honour)

=== Notable former players ===
This is a list of KF Shkupi players with senior national team appearances:

1. (Albania) (North Macedonia) Jasir Asani
2. (North Macedonia) Enis Bardhi
3. (North Macedonia) Sedat Berisha
4. (North Macedonia) Besmir Bojku
5. (Kosovo) Rron Broja
6. (Jamaica) Renaldo Cephas
7. (Senegal) Mamadou Danfa
8. (North Macedonia) Besir Demiri
9. (North Macedonia) Agon Elezi
10. (Albania) (North Macedonia) Feta Fetai
11. (Equatorial Guinea) Basilio Ndong
12. (North Macedonia) Ardian Nuhiu
13. (Kosovo) Suad Sahiti
14. (North Macedonia) Kristijan Toshevski

== Coaching staff ==
As of 18 March 2025

Position	Name	Nationality
Head coach	Ümit Sahin	Turkish
Assistant coach	Minas Osmani	Macedonian
Conditioning coach	Ferid Veseli	Macedonian
Stadium and security director	Samir Osman	Macedonian
Doctor	Darko Dimitrovski	Macedonian
Physiotherapists	Goran Gjorgjievski	Macedonian
Physiotherapists	Harun Zeneli	Macedonian
Equipment manager	Feta Bahtijari	Macedonian

== KF Shkupi in European football ==
KF Shkupi made their debut in European competition during the 2018–19 UEFA Europa League, where they faced Scottish club Rangers. Despite securing a 0–0 draw in the home leg, they were eliminated following a 0–2 defeat in Glasgow. The club's most significant European campaign occurred in the 2022–23 season after winning their first Macedonian First Football League title. During this run, Shkupi defeated Lincoln Red Imps in the first qualifying round and held Croatian champions Dinamo Zagreb to a 2–2 draw at the Stadion Maksimir before narrowly losing the return leg 0–1. This season saw the club compete in all three major UEFA club competitions, eventually reaching the UEFA Europa Conference League play-off round, where they were eliminated by Kosovan side KF Ballkani.

In the 2023–24 UEFA Europa Conference League, Shkupi achieved their largest European victory to date, a 5–0 away win against Lithuanian side FC Hegelmann. However, the club did not qualify for European competitions in the 2024–25 or 2025–26 seasons. This absence was attributed to a 7th-place finish in the 2024–25 domestic league and a temporary reduction in the number of European qualification spots allocated to North Macedonia due to a decline in the national UEFA coefficient.

=== Summary ===
As of 26 February 2026

==== By competition ====
Competition	Pld	W	D	L	GF	GA	GD	Win%
UEFA Champions League	4	1	1	2	5	5	0	25.00
UEFA Europa League	7	0	2	5	7	14	−7	0.00
UEFA Conference League	10	2	2	6	9	12	−3	20.00
Total	21	3	5	13	21	31	−10	14.29

==== By country ====
Country	Pld	W	D	L	GF	GA	GD	Win%
Armenia	2	0	1	1	4	5	−1	0.00
Azerbaijan	1	0	0	1	1	2	−1	0.00
Bulgaria	2	0	0	2	0	3	−3	0.00
Croatia	2	0	1	1	2	3	−1	0.00
Gibraltar	2	1	0	1	3	2	+1	50.00
(Republic of Ireland) Ireland	2	0	0	2	2	5	−3	0.00
Kosovo	4	1	1	2	4	4	0	25.00
Lithuania	2	1	1	0	5	0	+5	50.00
Portugal	2	0	0	2	0	5	−5	0.00
Scotland	2	0	1	1	0	2	−2	0.00

==== Results ====
Season	Competition	Round	Opponent	Home	Away	Agg.
2018–19	UEFA Europa League	1Q	(Scotland) Rangers	0–0	0–2	0–2
2019–20	UEFA Europa League	1Q	(Armenia) Pyunik	1–2	3–3	4–5
2020–21	UEFA Europa League	1Q	(Azerbaijan) Neftçi	—N/a	1–2	—N/a
2021–22	UEFA Europa Conference League	1Q	(Kosovo) Llapi	2–0	1–1	3–1
2021–22	UEFA Europa Conference League	2Q	(Portugal) Santa Clara	0–3	0–2	0–5
2022–23	UEFA Champions League	1Q	(Gibraltar) Lincoln Red Imps	3–0	0–2	3–2
2022–23	UEFA Champions League	2Q	(Croatia) Dinamo Zagreb	0–1	2–2	2–3
2022–23	UEFA Europa League	3Q	(Republic of Ireland) Shamrock Rovers	1–2	1–3	2–5
2022–23	UEFA Europa Conference League	PO	(Kosovo) Ballkani	1–2	0–1	1–3
2023–24	UEFA Europa Conference League	1Q	(Lithuania) Hegelmann	0–0	5–0	5–0
2023–24	UEFA Europa Conference League	2Q	(Bulgaria) Levski Sofia	0–2	0–1	0–3

== See also ==
- KB Shkupi (basketball)
