= FK Horizont Turnovo =

Horizont Turnovo
- Full name: Fudbalski klub Horizont Turnovo
- Founded: 1950; 76 years ago
- Ground: Stadion Kukuš
- Capacity: 1,500
- Chairman: Orce Todorov
- Manager: Aco Stojanov
- League: Macedonian Third League (Region 3)
- 2025–26: 4th
- Website: http://fkhorizont-turnovo.com/index.php
Home colours	Away colours

FK Horizont Turnovo (Macedonian: ФК Хоризонт Турново) is a football club based in the village Turnovo near Strumica, North Macedonia. They are currently playing in the Macedonian Third League (Region 3).

== History ==
The club was founded in 1950.

In 2008, the Macedonian company Horizont became Turnovo's main sponsor and the club was renamed to Horizont Turnovo. They have been a part of the Macedonian First League for 9 seasons, after winning the Macedonian Second League in 2008.

== Honours ==
- (North Macedonia) Macedonian First League:
  - Runners-up (1): 2013–14
- (North Macedonia) Macedonian Second League:
  - Winners (1): 2007–08
  - Runners-up (1): 1993–94

== Recent seasons ==
Season	League									Cup	European competitions	
Season	Division	P	W	D	L	F	A	Pts	Pos	Cup	European competitions	
1992–93	3. MFL East	34	24	6	4	102	21	54	1st ↑			
1993–94	2. MFL East	26	13	4	9	49	33	30	3rd			
1994–95	2. MFL East	30	12	5	13	39	33	41	8th			
1995–96	2. MFL East	30	13	3	14	50	44	42	7th			
1996–97	2. MFL East	30	12	4	14	37	45	40	11th	R1		
1997–98^{1}	2. MFL East	15	3	3	9	14	44	9^{(−3)}	15th ↓	R1		
1998–99	3. MFL East	32	18	6	8	80	36	57^{(−3)}	3rd			
1999–00	3. MFL East	33	24	4	5	110	40	76	2nd	PR		
2000–01	3. MFL East	27	23	2	2	101	26	71	1st ↑	PR		
2001–02	2. MFL	34	14	8	12	49	50	50	6th	PR		
2002–03	2. MFL	36	17	3	16	59	58	54	8th	R1		
2003–04	2. MFL	32	15	7	10	54	39	52	5th	R2		
2004–05	2. MFL	33	18	4	11	59	40	58	4th	SF		
2005–06	2. MFL	30	11	6	13	39	36	39	7th	R1		
2006–07	2. MFL	33	12	9	12	36	41	45	5th	R1		
2007–08	2. MFL	32	22	5	5	58	23	71	1st ↑	R1		
2008–09	1. MFL	30	9	10	11	25	39	37	6th	R1		
2009–10	1. MFL	26	8	5	13	27	35	26	8th	R1		
2010–11	1. MFL	33	13	6	14	35	35	45	6th	QF		
2011–12	1. MFL	33	10	8	15	34	42	38	9th	SF		
2012–13	1. MFL	33	17	12	4	49	31	63	3rd	R2		
2013–14	1. MFL	33	18	6	9	61	33	60	2nd	R2	Europa League	QR2
2014–15	1. MFL	32	9	9	14	26	34	36	8th	SF	Europa League	QR1
2015–16	1. MFL	33	12	10	11	45	43	46	8th	SF		
2016–17	2. MFL	27	9	9	9	37	29	36	4th	R2		
2017–18^{2}	2. MFL East	9	1	0	8	8	26	3	10th ↓	R2		
2018–19	3. MFL Southeast	10	4	0	6	20	27	12	6th	PR		
2019–20	The club was not participated in the senior competition											
2020–21	3. MFL East	16	12	1	3	46	13	37	2nd	PR		
2021–22	The club was not participated in the senior competition											
2022–23	The club was not participated in the senior competition											
2023–24	The club was not participated in the senior competition											
2024–25	3. MFL East	18	7	5	6	24	40	26	3rd	PR		
2025–26	3. MFL East	18	10	4	4	45	28	34	4th	PR		

^{1}Turnovo was withdrawn from the league after 15th round.

^{2}Turnovo were expelled from the league for not paying participation fee for the league.

== Turnovo in Europe ==
Season	Competition	Round	Opponent	Home	Away	Aggregate
2013–14	UEFA Europa League	First qualifying round	(Lithuania) Sūduva Marijampolė	2–2	2–2	4–4 (5–4 p)
2013–14	UEFA Europa League	Second qualifying round	(Croatia) Hajduk Split	1–1	1–2	2–3
2014–15	UEFA Europa League	First qualifying round	(Georgia (country)) Chikhura Sachkhere	0–1	1–3	1–4

== Historical list of coaches ==
- (North Macedonia) Jugoslav Trenchovski (1 Jul 2003 - 30 Jun 2005)
- (North Macedonia) Jugoslav Trenchovski (1 Jun 2007 - 10 Sep 2007)
- (North Macedonia) Vlatko Kostov (11 Sep 2007 - 30 Jun 2008)
- (North Macedonia) Dragan Bočeski (Jul 2008 - Oct 2008)
- (Bulgaria) Zvonko Todorov (2 Nov 2008 - Dec 2008)
- (North Macedonia) Ace Stojanov (7 Dec 2008 - Mar 2009)
- (North Macedonia) Ratko Janusev (28 Mar 2010 - Jun 2010)
- (North Macedonia) Shefki Arifovski (Jul 2010 - Apr 2011)
- (North Macedonia) Ljupčo Dimitkovski (16 Apr 2011 – May 2011)
- (North Macedonia) Tome Petrov (19 May 2011 - Jun 2011)
- (North Macedonia) Dragan Hristovski (Jul 2011 – Sep 2011)
- (North Macedonia) Tome Petrov (28 Sep 2011 – 31 Oct 2011)
- (North Macedonia) Gjorgji Todorovski (3 Nov 2011 – 26 Feb 2012)
- (North Macedonia) Ljupčo Dimitkovski (1 Feb 2012 – 8 Jun 2013)
- (Turkey) Ali Güneş (8 Jun 2013 - Aug 2013)
- (North Macedonia) Goce Sedloski (21 Aug 2013 – 15 Jul 2014)
- (North Macedonia) Shefki Arifovski (16 Jul 2014 - 15 Sep 2015)
- (North Macedonia) Ljupčo Dimitkovski (16 Jul 2014 – Jun 2015)
- (North Macedonia) Jane Nikolovski (16 Sep 2015 – 30 Jun 2016)
