= 2015 General Aung San Shield final =

- AYA UTD Vs YDNB
- Event: General Aung San Shield
Ayeyawady United	Yadanarbon
2	1
- Date: 27 September 2015
- Venue: Bogyoke Aung San Stadium, Yangon
- Man of the Match: (Myanmar) Kyaw Min Oo
- Referee: (Thailand) Mr.Taweechai Supatwan
- Attendance: about 15,000
- Weather: Partly cloudy 20 °C (68 °F)

The 2015 General Aung San Shield final was the 5th final of the MFF Cup. Ayeyawady United won the match 2-1 with goals from Riste Naumov and Kyaw Min Oo, for their third title. Moukailou scored for Yadanarbon FC. Ayeyawady qualified to AFC Cup competition with its win. The match was played at Bogyoke Aung San Stadium in Yangon. on 27 September 2015 and was the final match of the Bogyoke Aung San Cup.

== Background ==
Ayeyawady United were playing a record 3rd MFF Cup final. They had previously won two, most recently last season's final against Nay Pyi Taw.

It was Yadanarbon's first MFF Cup final.

== Ticket allocation ==
Both Ayeyawady United FC and Yadanarbon FC received a ticket allocation of 10,000 for the game. Ticket price were 500 MMK (normal ticket) and 1000MMK (special ticket).

== Route to the final ==
=== Ayeyawady United ===
Round	Opposition	Score
2nd	All-University Selection FC	7–0
QF	Zwegapin United	2–2(p. 4-3)
SF	Rakhine United	2–0/1-0 (h/a)
Key: (h) = Home venue; (a) = Away venue; (n) = Neutral venue.

MFF Cup holders Ayeyawady United entered the competition in the second round as a Myanmar National League club. In their first match, they were drawn at Thuwunna Stadium against MNL-2 team All-University Selection FC. At the Thuwunna Stadium, Ayeyawady United won 7–0 with goals from Pyae Phyo Oo, Lazar, Thiha Zaw and Riste (4 goals). Riste got a hat trick. In the quarterfinal, Ayeyawady United drew a MNL team, Zwegapin United. At the Bogyoke Aung San Stadium, Ayeyawady United drew 2–2 and won (4-3) on penalty shots. In the semifinal round, Ayeyawady United beat Rakhine United 2-0 at home and 1-0 away.

=== Yadanarbon ===
Round	Opposition	Score
2nd	Horizon FC	9–0
QF	Hantharwady United	2-1
SF	Magway	6–0/2-0 (h/a)
Key: (h) = Home venue; (a) = Away venue; (n) = Neutral venue.

Also a Myanmar National League team, Yadanarbon entered the tournament in the second round with 9-0 win over MNL-2 club Horizon. In the quarterfinal, they defeated another second-tier team at Bogyoke Aung San Stadium, Hantharwady United, 2-1. Yadanarbon hosted the first leg of their semifinal on 12 August and defeated Magwe 6-0, with a halftime lead from Keith. They won 2-0 again in the second leg at the Thuwunna Stadium on 19 August with goals from Yeon Gisung and Aung Thu to reach the final for the first time.

== Match ==
=== Team selection ===
Ayeyawady United's Captain, Min Min Thu missed the final. Yadnarbon FC coach didn't choose Nanda Lin Kyaw Chit and Zaw Linn Tun.

=== Details ===
27 September 2015
16:00 MST

Ayeyawady United	2 - 1	Yadanarbon
Riste Naumov 64'; Kyaw Min Oo 71'		Moukailou 22'

Bogyoke Aung San Stadium, Yangon
Referee: (Thailand) Mr.Taweechai Supatwan

Ayeyawady United	Yadanarbon FC

GK	1	(Myanmar) Vanlal Hruala
RB	2	(Myanmar) San Myo Oo
CB	3	(Myanmar) Moe Win (c)
CB	28	(Nigeria) Anderson Ebimo West
LB	5	(Myanmar) Hein Thiha Zaw
CM	16	(Myanmar) Kyaw Min Oo	(yellow card) 78'	(substituted off) 88'
CM	26	(South Korea) Sim Woo Sub
RW	17	(Myanmar) Nay Lin Tun		(substituted off) 60'
LW	10	(Myanmar) Thiha Zaw	(yellow card) 90+2'
CF	29	(North Macedonia) Riste Naumov
CF	11	(Bosnia and Herzegovina) Vidic Lazar		(substituted off) 51'
Substitutes:
GK	25	(Myanmar) Chan Nyein Kyaw
MF	4	(Myanmar) Naing Lin Oo		(substituted on) 60'
DF	14	(Myanmar) Htike Htike Aung
MF	19	(Myanmar) Aung Kyaw Naing		(substituted on) 51'
DF	20	(Myanmar) Phyo Ko Ko Thein		(substituted on) 88'
MF	21	(Myanmar) Aung Kyaw Myo
FW	23	(Myanmar) Pyaw Phyo Oo
Manager:
(North Macedonia) Marjan Sekulovski

GK	18	(Myanmar) Nyi Nyi Lwin
RB	11	(Myanmar) Thet Naing	(red card) 66'
CB	2	(Cameroon) Moukailou
CB	7	(Ivory Coast) Maximum (c)
LB	30	(Myanmar) Nay Myo Aung
LM	21	(Myanmar) Sithu Aung
CM	31	(Myanmar) Myo Ko Tun	(yellow card) 58'	(substituted off) 61'
CM	26	(Myanmar) Ye Ko Oo		(substituted off) 75'
RM	20	(Myanmar) Shine Thu Ya		(substituted off) 80'
CF	8	(Myanmar) Aung Thu
CF	22	(Liberia) Keith Martu Nah
Substitutes:
GK	25	(Myanmar) Pyae Lyan Aung
DF	5	(Myanmar) Zaw Ye Tun
DM	6	(Myanmar) Tin Win Aung		(substituted on) 61'
FW	9	(Myanmar) Yan Paing		(substituted on) 75'
FW	15	(South Korea) Yeon Gisung		(substituted on) 80'
MF	16	(Myanmar) Hlaing Bo Bo
DF	23	(Myanmar) Hein Nay San
Manager:
(Belgium) René Desaeyere

Man of the match

- (Myanmar) Kyaw Min Oo

Match officials

- Assistant referees:
  - (Thailand) Mr.Suriya Lee-intr
  - (Thailand) Mr.Pattarapong Kijsathit
- Fourth official: (Myanmar) Mr.Win Htut
- Reserve official: (Myanmar) Mr.Tun Hla Aung
- Match Commissioner: (Myanmar) Mr.Myo Win Nyunt

Match rules

- 90 minutes.
- 30 minutes of extra-time if necessary.
- Penalty shoot-out if scores still level.
- Seven named substitutes.
- Maximum of three substitutions.

=== Statistics ===
Statistic	Ayeyawady United	Yadanarbon FC
Goals scored	2	1
Possession	30%	70%
Shots on target	4	12
Shots off target	7	5
Corner kicks	4	8
Fouls	9	14
Offsides	0	0
Yellow cards	2	1
Red cards	0	1

== Broadcasting rights ==
These matches were broadcast live on Myanmar television.

Round	MWD	Sky Net
Final	Ayeyawady United v Yadanarbon FC	
