= 2015 Ayeyawady United F.C. season =

Ayeyawady United
2015 season
- Owner: (Myanmar) U Zaw Win Shein
- Manager: (North Macedonia) Marjan Sekulovski
- Stadium: Ayar Stadium
- Myanmar National League: 4th
- Bogyoke Aung San Cup: Champions
- Charity Cup: Champions

== Achievements ==
- 2015 Charity Cup : Champions
- 2015 General Aung San Shield : Champions

== Sponsorship ==
Period	Sportswear	Sponsor
2015	(Thailand) FBT	(Myanmar) 100Plus

== Club ==
=== Coaching staff ===
Position	Staff
Manager	(North Macedonia) Marjan Sekulovski
Assistant Manager	(Myanmar) U Myo Win
Assistant Manager	(Myanmar)
Assistant Manager	(Myanmar)
Assistant Manager	(Myanmar)
Goalkeeper Coach	(Myanmar)
Fitness Coach	(Myanmar)

Source: Ayeyawady United FC

=== Other information ===
Owner	(Myanmar) Zaw Win Shein
Ground (capacity and dimensions)	Ayar Stadium (3,000 / 103x67 metres)
Training Ground	Ayar Stadium

=== 2015 AFC Cup ===
Season	Competition	Round		Club	Home	Away
2015	AFC Cup	Group	(Indonesia)	Persib Bandung	1–1	3–3
2015	AFC Cup	Group	(Maldives)	New Radiant	0–0	3–0
2015	AFC Cup	Group	(Laos)	Lao Toyota FC	4–3	2–2
2015	AFC Cup	Round of 16	(Malaysia)	Johor Darul Ta'zim	0–5	

=== Bogyoke Aung San Cup ===
13 July 2015 2nd Round	All-University Selection FC	7–0	Ayeyawady United	Yangon
		[ Summary]	Riste Naumov 7', 34', 43', 53'; Pyae Phyo Oo 22'; Vidic Lazar 83'; Thiha Zaw 90+3'	Stadium: Thuwunna Stadium Stadium

2 August 2015 Quarter-final	Ayeyawady United	2–2 (a.e.t.) (3–4 p)	Zwegapin United	Yangon
	Zivkovic 2'; Kaung Sithu 90+4'	[ Summary]	Riste Naumov 18', 30' (pen.)	Stadium: Bogyoke Aung San Stadium
	Penalties
	Zivkovic (penalty scored); Thein Zaw (penalty missed); Junior (penalty scored); Ken (penalty scored); Shwe Win Tun (penalty missed)		(penalty scored) Lazar; (penalty scored) Sim Woo Sub; (penalty scored) Moe Win; (penalty scored) San Myo Oo

13 August 2015 Semi-final(First-leg)	Ayeyawady United	2–0	Rakhine United	Yangon
	Vidic Lazar 9'; Riste Naumov 59' (pen.)	[ Summary]		Stadium: Thuwunna Stadium

20 August 2015 Semi-final(Second-leg)	Rakhine United	0–1	Ayeyawady United	Yangon
	Thiha Zaw 23'	[ Summary]		Stadium: Bogyoke Aung San Stadium

27 September 2015 Final	Ayeyawady United	2–1	Yadanarbon	Yangon
	Riste Naumov 67'; Kyaw Min Oo 77'		Kekere Moukailou 22'	Stadium: Bogyoke Aung San Stadium

=== First team squad ===
As of 4 August 2015.

Squad No.	Name	Nationality	Position(s)	Date of birth (age)
Goalkeepers
1	Vanlal Hruala	(Myanmar)	GK	25 May 1991 (age 34)
18	Aung Min Khant	(Myanmar)	GK	2 May 1992 (age 33)
25	Chan Nyein Kyaw	(Myanmar)	GK	27 October 1993 (age 32)
Defenders
2	San Myo Oo	(Myanmar)	RB	
3	Moe Win (vice-captain)	(Myanmar)	CB / DM	30 March 1988 (age 37)
5	Hein Thiha Zaw	(Myanmar)	LB	1 August 1995 (age 30)
6	Nay Lin Aung	(Myanmar)	CB	
8	Aye Ko Ko Maung	(Myanmar)	CB	
12	Thet Lwin Win	(Myanmar)	RB / LB	
14	Htike Htike Aung	(Myanmar)	CB / RB	1 February 1995 (age 31)
15	Chit San Maung	(Myanmar)	LB	25 January 1988 (age 38)
20	Phyo Ko Ko Thein	(Myanmar)	CB	24 January 1993 (age 33)
22	Aung Moe Htwe	(Myanmar)	CB	
24	Htoo Kyaw	(Myanmar)	CB	
28	Anderson Ebimo West	(Nigeria)	CB	31 August 1989 (age 36)
Midfielders
4	Naing Lin Oo	(Myanmar)	CM / DM	15 June 1993 (age 32)
7	Min Min Thu (captain)	(Myanmar)	CM / AM	30 March 1988 (age 37)
10	Thiha Zaw	(Myanmar)	RW / LW	28 December 1993 (age 32)
13	Soe Min Tun	(Myanmar)	LW / AM / RW	
16	Kyaw Min Oo	(Myanmar)	CM / AM	16 June 1996 (age 29)
17	Nay Lin Tun	(Myanmar)	RW	19 March 1993 (age 32)
19	Aung Kyaw Naing	(Myanmar)	RW / LW / CF	20 December 1994 (age 31)
26	Sim Woo Sub	(South Korea)	CM	
27	Zin Myo Aung	(Myanmar)	DM / CM	
30	Yan Paing Soe	(Myanmar)	AM / RW	
Strikers
9	Soe Kyaw Kyaw	(Myanmar)	CF	16 February 1991 (age 34)
11	Vidic Lazar	(Serbia)	CF	10 July 1989 (age 36)
21	Aung Kyaw Myo	(Myanmar)	CF	
23	Pyae Phyo Oo	(Myanmar)	CF	
29	Riste Naumov	(North Macedonia)	CF	14 April 1981 (age 44)

- HG^{1} = Association-trained player
- HG^{2} = Club-trained player
- U21 = Under-21 player

== Transfers ==
In: Note: Flags indicate national team as defined under FIFA eligibility rules; some limited exceptions apply. Players may hold more than one non-FIFA nationality.

No.	Pos.	Nation	Player
12	DF	MYA	Thet Lwin Win (from (Myanmar) Yangon United)
15	DF	MYA	Chit San Maung (from (Myanmar) Nay Pyi Taw)
19	MF	MYA	Aung Kyaw Naing (from (Myanmar) Nay Pyi Taw)
28	DF	CIV	Anderson Ebimo West
26	MF	Korea	Sim Woo Sub
29	FW	MKD	Riste Naumov
11	FW	SRB	Vidic Lazar
14	DF	MYA	Htike Htike Aung (from Youth Team)

Out: Note: Flags indicate national team as defined under FIFA eligibility rules; some limited exceptions apply. Players may hold more than one non-FIFA nationality.

No.	Pos.	Nation	Player
30	GK	MYA	Nay Hlaing (to (Myanmar) Yangon United)
