= 2015 MFF Charity Cup =

Ayeyawady United	Yadanarbon F.C.
1	0
- Date: 3 January 2015
- Venue: Aung San Stadium, Yangon
- Man of the Match: (North Macedonia) Riste Naumov
- Referee: (Myanmar) U Win Htut
- Weather: Partly cloudy 25 °C (77 °F)

The 2015 MFF Charity Cup is the 4th MFF Charity Cup, an annual Myanmar football match played between the winners of the previous season's Myanmar National League and 2014 MFF Cup. The match was contested by Ayeyawady United, the 2014 MFF Cup winners, and Yadanarbon F.C., champions of the 2014 Myanmar National League. It was held at Aung San Stadium on 3 January 2015.

This was Yadanarbon F.C.'s 1st Cup appearance and Ayeyawady United's 2nd.

== Background and pre-match ==
Yadanarbon F.C. qualified for the 2016 MFF Charity Cup as winners of the 2014 Myanmar National League. It was the club's third league title in 5 years. The other Charity Cup place went to Ayeyawady United, who defeated Nay Pyi Taw F.C. by two goals to win the 2014 MFF Cup and retain the trophy. Yadanarbon F.C. made their first appearance in the Charity Cup. By contrast, Ayeyawady United made their third Chairity Cup appearance, and won once. Both clubs had never met before in this Cup.

== Match ==
=== Details ===
27 September 2015
16:00 MST

Ayeyawady United	1 - 0	Yadanarbon F.C.
Riste Naumov 57'

Bogyoke Aung San Stadium, Yangon
Referee: (Myanmar) U Win Htut

Ayeyawady United	Yadanarbon FC

GK	1	(Myanmar) Vanlal Hruala
RB	2	(Myanmar) San Myo Oo
CB	3	(Myanmar) Moe Win
CB	28	(Nigeria) Anderson West
LB	15	(Myanmar) Chit San Maung
LM	10	(Myanmar) Thiha Zaw
DM	4	(Myanmar) Naing Lin Oo
CM	7	(Myanmar) Min Min Thu (c)
CM	26	(South Korea) Sim Woo Sub
RM	17	(Myanmar) Nay Lin Tun
CF	29	(North Macedonia) Riste Naumov
Substitutes:
GK	18	(Myanmar) Aung Min Khant
DF	5	(Myanmar) Hein Thiha Zaw
DF	6	(Myanmar) Nay Lin Aung
MF	19	(Myanmar) Aung Kyaw Naing
MF	20	(Myanmar) Phyo Ko Ko Thein
FW	21	(Myanmar) Aung Kyaw Myo
MF	23	(Myanmar) Pyae Phyo Oo
Manager:
(North Macedonia) Marjan Sekulovski

GK	1	(Myanmar) Thiha Sithu	(yellow card) 56'
RB	17	(Myanmar) Ye Win Aung
CB	2	(Nigeria) Happiness
CB	3	(Myanmar) Zaw Linn Tun
LB	21	(Myanmar) Sithu Aung
LM	10	(Myanmar) Nanda Lin Kyaw Chit
CM	7	(Ivory Coast) Maximin
CM	15	(Australia) James Meyer
RM	24	(Liberia) Boakay Eddie Foday
CF	9	(Myanmar) Yan Paing (c)
CF	28	(Myanmar) Zin Min Tun
Substitutes:
GK	18	(Myanmar) Nyi Nyi Lwin
DF	11	(Myanmar) Thet Naing
DM	14	(Myanmar) Tun Nyein
FW	22	(Myanmar) Aung Myo Lwin
CM	26	(Myanmar) Ye Ko Oo
MF	29	(Myanmar) Win Naing Soe
DF	30	(Myanmar) Nay Myo Aung
Manager:
(Myanmar) Khin Maung Tint

Man of the match

- (North Macedonia) Riste Naumov

Match officials

- Assistant referees:
  - (Myanmar) U Aung Moe
  - (Myanmar) U Han Thein
- Fourth official: (Myanmar) U Thant Zin Oo
- Reserve official: (Myanmar) U Hla Myint Lait
- Match Commissioner: (Myanmar) U Myo Win Nyunt

Match rules

- 90 minutes.
- 30 minutes of extra-time if necessary.
- Penalty shoot-out if scores still level.
- Seven named substitutes.
- Maximum of three substitutions.

=== Statistics ===
Statistic	Ayeyawady United	Yangon United
Goals scored	1	0
Possession		
Shots on target		
Shots off target		
Corner kicks		
Fouls		
Offsides		
Yellow cards		
Red cards		1
