= 2013–14 FK Pelister season =

Pelister
2013–14 season
- Chairman: Dimche Sherovski
- Manager: Dragan Bocheski
- Stadium: Stadion Tumbe Kafe
- First League: 6th
- Macedonian Cup: Quarter-finals
- Top goalscorer: League: Dimitar Vodenicharov (9); All: Dimitar Vodenicharov (10)
- Highest home attendance: 7,000 vs Vardar; 6 October 2013
- Lowest home attendance: 400 vs Gostivar; 30 March 2014
| Home colours | Away colours |

The 2013–14 season was a FK Pelister's 2nd consecutive season in First League. This article shows player statistics and all official matches that the club was played during the 2013–14 season.

== Current squad ==
As of 29 January 2014

Note: Flags indicate national team as defined under FIFA eligibility rules; some limited exceptions apply. Players may hold more than one non-FIFA nationality.

| No. | Pos. | Nation | Player |
|---|---|---|---|
| 1 | GK | MKD | Goran Pashovski (captain) |
| — | GK | MKD | Dejan Apostolovski |
| 3 | DF | BUL | Kiril Dinchev |
| 6 | DF | MKD | Hristijan Dragarski |
| 7 | DF | MKD | Vladica Brdarovski |
| 19 | DF | BUL | Martin Kovachev |
| 20 | DF | MKD | Ilir Elmazovski |
| — | DF | MKD | Toni Maglovski |
| — | DF | MKD | Hristijan Atanasovski |
| — | DF | MKD | Mile Petkovski |
| 5 | MF | MKD | Burhan Mustafov |
| 9 | MF | MKD | Aleksandar Anastasov |
| 10 | MF | MKD | Gjorgji Mojsov |

| No. | Pos. | Nation | Player |
|---|---|---|---|
| 13 | MF | MKD | Dimche Ristevski |
| 15 | MF | MKD | Petar Ljamchevski |
| 16 | MF | BUL | Nikolay Hristov |
| — | MF | BUL | Lyubomir Lyubenov |
| — | MF | MKD | Filip Milenkovski |
| — | MF | BIH | Rijad Demić |
| — | MF | MKD | Martin Mirčevski |
| — | MF | MKD | Antonio Stojkovski |
| — | MF | MKD | Jovančo Trajkoski |
| 11 | FW | MKD | Blagojče Markovski |
| 18 | FW | BUL | Dimitar Vodenicharov |
| — | FW | MKD | Blagojche Glavevski |
| — | FW | MKD | Darko Milevski |

== Competitions ==
=== First League ===
==== Results summary ====
| Overall | | | | | | | | Home | | | | | | Away | | | | | |
| Pld | W | D | L | GF | GA | GD | Pts | W | D | L | GF | GA | GD | W | D | L | GF | GA | GD |
|---|---|---|---|---|---|---|---|---|---|---|---|---|---|---|---|---|---|---|---|
| 33 | 14 | 10 | 9 | 40 | 40 | 0 | 52 | 10 | 3 | 3 | 21 | 13 | +8 | 4 | 7 | 6 | 19 | 27 | −8 |

==== Results by round ====
| Round | 1 | 2 | 3 | 4 | 5 | 6 | 7 | 8 | 9 | 10 | 11 | 12 | 13 | 14 | 15 | 16 | 17 | 18 | 19 | 20 | 21 | 22 | 23 | 24 | 25 | 26 | 27 | 28 | 29 | 30 | 31 | 32 | 33 |
|---|---|---|---|---|---|---|---|---|---|---|---|---|---|---|---|---|---|---|---|---|---|---|---|---|---|---|---|---|---|---|---|---|---|
| Ground | H | A | H | A | H | A | H | A | H | H | A | A | H | A | H | A | H | A | H | A | A | H | H | A | H | A | H | H | A | H | A | H | A |
| Result | W | W | D | L | D | D | W | D | W | L | D | D | L | W | W | W | W | D | W | L | D | W | W | W | W | L | L | W | D | L | L | D | L |
| Position | 4 | 2 | 3 | 3 | 5 | 5 | 3 | 5 | 1 | 4 | 5 | 7 | 7 | 6 | 4 | 3 | 2 | 4 | 3 | 4 | 4 | 4 | 3 | 1 | 1 | 2 | 5 | 4 | 4 | 5 | 6 | 6 | 6 |

Updated to match(es) played on 18 May 2014. Source: Competitive matches
A = Away; H = Home; W = Win; D = Draw; L = Loss

==== Results ====
| 4 August 2013 1 | Pelister | 1 – 0 | Gorno Lisiče | Bitola |
| 18:00 | Dragarski 69' | Report | | Stadium: Stadion Tumbe Kafe; Attendance: 3,000; Referee: Josip Barton (Tetovo) |

| 11 August 2013 2 | Renova | 1 – 2 | Pelister | Tetovo |
| 17:30 | Emini 26'; Musliu (red card) 35' | Report | Ristov 45' (o.g.); Milenkovski 72' | Stadium: Gradski stadion Attendance: 500; Referee: Konstantin Vlaho (Skopje) |

| 18 August 2013 3 | Pelister | 0 – 0 | Horizont Turnovo | Bitola |
| 17:30 | Kitanovski (yellow card) 61' (red card); Dragarski (yellow card) 71' (red card) | Report | Mitrev (yellow card) 87' (red card) | Stadium: Stadion Tumbe Kafe; Attendance: 4,000; Referee: Dimitar Mechkarovski (Skopje) |

| 25 August 2013 4 | Bregalnica Štip | 3 – 0 | Pelister | Štip |
| 17:00 | Stupić (red card) 11'; Iliev 32'; Stojanov 64'; Zdravkov 90+' | Report | | Stadium: Gradski stadion Attendance: 3,000; Referee: Dejan Jakimovski (Skopje) |

| 28 August 2013 5 | Pelister | 2 – 2 | Metalurg Skopje | Bitola |
| 17:00 | Altiparmakovski 2', 64' | Report | Vujović 19'; Krstev 57' | Stadium: Stadion Tumbe Kafe; Attendance: 2,500; Referee: Marjan Eckoski (Ohrid) |

| 1 September 2013 6 | Gostivar | 1 – 1 | Pelister | Gostivar |
| 16:30 | Lloga 36' (red card) 77' | Report | Júnior 42' | Stadium: Gradski stadion Attendance: 1,500; Referee: Stojanche Stojanov (Štip) |

| 15 September 2013 7 | Pelister | 1 – 0 | Shkëndija | Bitola |
| 16:00 | Kovachev 44' | Report | | Stadium: Stadion Tumbe Kafe; Attendance: 3,500; Referee: Dalibor Gjorgjevski (Kumanovo) |

| 22 September 2013 8 | Napredok | 2 – 2 | Pelister | Kičevo |
| 15:30 | Cvetanovski 79'; Mojsovski 90' | Report | Kitanovski 51'; Lyubenov 82' (pen.) | Stadium: Gradski stadion Attendance: 2,500; Referee: Marjan Eckoski (Ohrid) |

| 29 September 2013 9 | Pelister | 1 – 0 | Rabotnički | Bitola |
| 15:30 | Anastasov 84' | Report | | Stadium: Stadion Tumbe Kafe; Attendance: 3,500; Referee: Dimitar Mechkarovski (Skopje) |

| 6 October 2013 10 | Pelister | 1 – 2 | Vardar | Bitola |
| 15:00 | Júnior 11' | Report | Ademović 18'; Stojkov 69' | Stadium: Stadion Tumbe Kafe; Attendance: 7,000; Referee: Aleksandar Stavrev (Skopje) |

| 20 October 2013 11 | Makedonija GjP | 0 – 0 | Pelister | Skopje |
| 14:00 | | Report | | Stadium: Stadion Gjorče Petrov; Attendance: 1,000; Referee: Stevche Shuleski (Ohrid) |

| 27 October 2013 12 | Gorno Lisiče | 2 – 2 | Pelister | Skopje |
| 13:00 | Stojanovski 5'; Jasharovski 69' | Report | Anastasov 75'; Milevski 86' | Stadium: Stadion Boris Trajkovski; Attendance: 300; Referee: Stojanche Stojanov (Štip) |

| 30 October 2013 13 | Pelister | 0 – 4 | Renova | Bitola |
| 13:00 | | Report | Emini 8'; Rexhepi 70'; Ramadani 72'; Sali 76' | Stadium: Stadion Tumbe Kafe; Attendance: 700; Referee: Dimitar Mechkarovski (Skopje) |

| 3 November 2013 14 | Horizont Turnovo | 0 – 2 | Pelister | Turnovo |
| 13:00 | | Report | Lyubenov 37'; Júnior 75' | Stadium: Stadion Kukuš; Attendance: 800; Referee: Marjan Eckoski (Ohrid) |

| 10 November 2013 15 | Pelister | 1 – 0 | Bregalnica Štip | Bitola |
| 13:00 | Blazhevski 44' (o.g.) | Report | | Stadium: Stadion Tumbe Kafe; Attendance: 2,000; Referee: Josip Barton (Tetovo) |

| 24 November 2013 16 | Metalurg Skopje | 2 – 4 | Pelister | Skopje |
| 13:00 | Peev 24'; Krstev 50' | Report | Júnior 7', 34' (pen.), 67', 88' | Stadium: Stadion Železarnica; Attendance: 200; Referee: Marjan Eckoski (Ohrid) |

| 27 November 2013 17 | Pelister | 1 – 0 | Gostivar | Bitola |
| 13:00 | Vodenicharov 76' | Report | | Stadium: Stadion Tumbe Kafe; Attendance: 400; Referee: Simeon Stefkov (Skopje) |

| 1 December 2013 18 | Shkëndija | 0 – 0 | Pelister | Tetovo |
| 13:00 | | Report | | Stadium: Gradski stadion Attendance: 1,000; Referee: Konstantin Vlaho (Skopje) |

| 8 December 2013 19 | Pelister | 4 – 0 | Napredok | Bitola |
| 13:00 | Mojsov 26'; Vodenicharov 73', 79'; Altiparmakovski 85' | Report | | Stadium: Stadion Tumbe Kafe; Attendance: 1,000; Referee: Simeon Stefkov (Skopje) |

| 1 March 2014 20 | Rabotnički | 4 – 0 | Pelister | Skopje |
| 14:00 | Ilijoski 36', 43'; Manevski 49'; Todorovski 86' | Report | | Stadium: Philip II Arena; Attendance: 200; Referee: Konstantin Vlaho (Skopje) |

| 9 March 2014 21 | Vardar | 1 – 1 | Pelister | Skopje |
| 16:00 | Naumoski 41' (pen.); Cikarski (red card) 52' | Report | Ljamchevski 5' | Stadium: Philip II Arena; Attendance: 4,000; Referee: Dimitar Mechkarovski (Skopje) |

| 18 March 2014 22 | Pelister | 2 – 1 | Makedonija GjP | Bitola |
| 14:00 | Kovachev 66'; Vodenicharov 89' (pen.) | Report | Adem 2' | Stadium: Stadion Tumbe Kafe; Attendance: 1,500; Referee: Dalibor Gjorgjevski (Kumanovo) |

| 23 March 2014 23 | Pelister | 2 – 1 | Makedonija GjP | Bitola |
| 14:00 | Kovachev 89'; Vodenicharov 90+2' | Report | Gjurgjevikj 81' | Stadium: Tumbe Kafe; Attendance: 1,500; Referee: Marjan Eckoski (Ohrid) |

| 26 March 2014 24 | Napredok | 1 – 3 | Pelister | Kičevo |
| 15:00 | Balazhi 88' (pen.) | Report | Vodenicharov 39', 53'; Ljamchevski 68' | Stadium: Gradski stadion Attendance: 600; Referee: Dimitar Mechkarovski (Skopje) |

| 30 March 2014 25 | Pelister | 2 – 0 | Gostivar | Bitola |
| 16:00 | Lyubenov 26'; Vodenicharov 90' | Report | | Stadium: Stadion Tumbe Kafe; Attendance: 2,000; Referee: Dejan Jakimovski (Skopje) |

| 6 April 2014 26 | Renova | 2 – 1 | Pelister | Tetovo |
| 15:00 | Rexhepi 65'; Asani 89' | Report | Vodenicharov 79' | Stadium: Gradski stadion Attendance: 800; Referee: Goran Spirkoski (Prilep) |

| 12 April 2014 27 | Pelister | 1 – 3 | Metalurg Skopje | Bitola |
| 15:00 | Lyubenov 60' | Report | Radeski 30'; Peev 45+1'; Vujović 83' | Stadium: Stadion Tumbe Kafe; Attendance: 1,000; Referee: Josip Barton (Tetovo) |

| 19 April 2014 28 | Pelister | 1 – 0 | Gorno Lisiče | Bitola |
| 16:00 | Dragarski 23' | Report | Stojkovski (yellow card) 50' (yellow-red card) | Stadium: Stadion Tumbe Kafe; Attendance: 800; Referee: Dalibor Gjorgjevski (Kumanovo) |

| 23 April 2014 29 | Vardar | 0 – 0 | Pelister | Skopje |
| 18:00 | | Report | | Stadium: Philip II Arena; Attendance: 2,000; Referee: Stevche Shuleski (Ohrid) |

| 26 April 2014 30 | Pelister | 1 – 2 | Rabotnički | Bitola |
| 15:00 | Glavevski 89' | Report | Todorovski 3'; Manevski 54' | Stadium: Stadion Tumbe Kafe; Attendance: 500; Referee: Josip Barton (Tetovo) |

| 4 May 2014 31 | Horizont Turnovo | 1 – 0 | Pelister | Turnovo |
| 15:00 | Pandev 71' | Report | | Stadium: Stadion Kukuš; Attendance: 1,100; Referee: Dejan Jakimovski (Skopje) |

| 11 May 2014 32 | Pelister | 1 – 1 | Bregalnica Štip | Bitola |
| 16:00 | Vodenicharov 81' | Report | Naumov 16' | Stadium: Stadion Tumbe Kafe; Attendance: 500; Referee: Aleksandar Stavrev (Skopje) |

| 18 May 2014 33 | Shkëndija | 4 – 0 | Pelister | Tetovo |
| 16:30 | Vručina 54' (pen.), 67'; Shabani 59'; Nurishi 72' | Report | | Stadium: Gradski stadion Attendance: 5,500; Referee: Marjan Markoski (Ohrid) |

==== Table ====
| Pos | Team | Pld | W | D | L | GF | GA | GD | Pts | Qualification or relegation |
|---|---|---|---|---|---|---|---|---|---|---|
| 4 | Shkëndija | 33 | 16 | 9 | 8 | 53 | 32 | +21 | 57 | Qualification to Europa League first qualifying round (Note: Metalurg qualified for the Europa League first qualifying round as a runner-up of the 2013–14 Macedonian Football Cup.) |
| 5 | Vardar | 33 | 15 | 11 | 7 | 55 | 32 | +23 | 56 | |
| 6 | Pelister | 33 | 14 | 10 | 9 | 40 | 40 | 0 | 52 | |
| 7 | Bregalnica Shtip | 33 | 11 | 11 | 11 | 34 | 34 | 0 | 44 | |
| 8 | Renova | 33 | 10 | 14 | 9 | 42 | 46 | −4 | 44 | |

Source: MacedonianFootball.com
Rules for classification: 1) Points; 2) Goal difference; 3) Goals scored; 4) Head-to-head points; 5) Head-to-head goal difference; 6) Head-to-head away goals scored (only if two teams); 7) Head-to-head goals scored; 8) Draw; 9) Play-off. (Note: Criteria 2, 3 and 8 is only used if not deciding Champion, teams for UEFA competitions or relegation).

=== Macedonian Football Cup ===
==== First round ====
| 21 August 2013 | Karaorman | 0 – 5 | Pelister | Struga |
| 17:00 | | Report | Milenkovski 41'; K. Stepanovski 50'; Júnior 66'; Altiparmakovski 85'; Trajkoski 89' | Stadium: Stadion Gradska Plaža; Attendance: 500; Referee: Josip Barton (Tetovo) |

==== Second round ====
| 18 September 2013 First leg | Pelister | 2 – 0 | Miravci | Bitola |
| 16:00 | Vodenicharov 69'; Altiparmakovski 89' | Report | | Stadium: Stadion Tumbe Kafe; Attendance: 800; Referee: Darko Stojchevski (Skopje) |

| 25 September 2013 Second leg | Miravci | 2 – 0 (2 – 2 agg.) (2–3 p) | Pelister | Gevgelija |
| 16:00 | Gjonov 37'; Jakov 75' | Report | | Stadium: Gradski stadion Attendance: 1,000; Referee: Nikola Kostenčev (Skopje) |

==== Quarter-final ====
| 13 October 2013 First leg | Pelister | 1 – 0 | Rabotnički | Bitola |
| 14:00 | Altiparmakovski 22' | Report | | Stadium: Tumbe Kafe; Attendance: 1,500; Referee: Goran Spirkoski (Prilep) |

| 4 December 2013 Second leg | Rabotnički | 2 – 0 (2 – 1 agg.) | Pelister | Skopje |
| 13:00 | Imeri 77'; Velkoski 86' | Report | | Stadium: Philip II Arena; Attendance: 100; Referee: Goran Spirkoski (Prilep) |

== Statistics ==
=== Top scorers ===
| Rank | Name | League | Cup | Total |
|---|---|---|---|---|
| 1 | (Bulgaria) Dimitar Vodenicharov | 9 | 1 | 10 |
| 2 | (Brazil) Stênio Júnior | 7 | 1 | 8 |
| 3 | (North Macedonia) Marjan Altiparmakovski | 3 | 3 | 5 |
| 4 | (Bulgaria) Lyubomir Lyubenov | 4 | – | 4 |
| 5 | (Bulgaria) Martin Kovachev | 3 | – | 3 |
| 6 | (North Macedonia) Aleksandar Anastasov | 2 | – | 2 |
| 6 | (North Macedonia) Hristijan Dragarski | 2 | – | 2 |
| 6 | (North Macedonia) Petar Ljamchevski | 2 | – | 2 |
| 6 | (North Macedonia) Filip Milenkovski | 1 | 1 | 2 |
| 10 | (North Macedonia) Blagojche Glavevski | 1 | – | 1 |
| 10 | (North Macedonia) Tome Kitanovski | 1 | – | 1 |
| 10 | (North Macedonia) Darko Milevski | 1 | – | 1 |
| 10 | (North Macedonia) Gjorgji Mojsov | 1 | – | 1 |
| 10 | (North Macedonia) Kiril Stepanovski | – | 1 | 1 |
| 10 | (North Macedonia) Jovancho Trajkoski | – | 1 | 1 |
| | Own goals | 2 | – | 2 |
| | TOTALS | 40 | 8 | 48 |
