= 2000–01 Macedonian Football Cup =

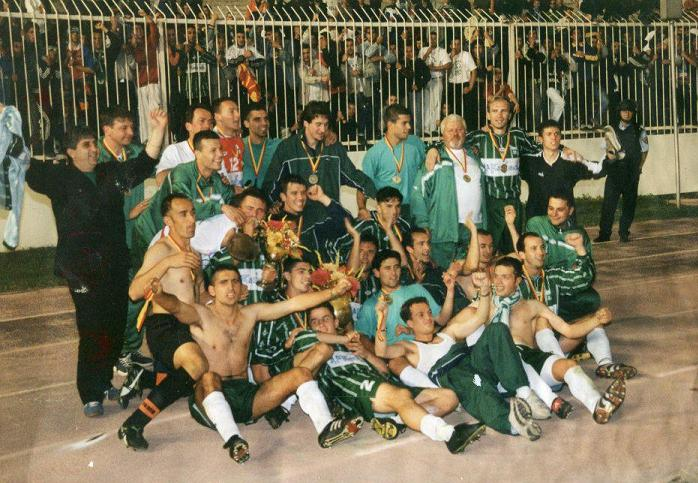
- Pelister winners of the cup in 2001

Tournament details
- Country: Macedonia
- Dates: 12 August 2000 – 24 May 2001
- Teams: 32

Final positions
- Champions: Pelister (1st title)
- Runners-up: Sloga Jugomagnat

Tournament statistics
- Matches played: 44
- Goals scored: 164 (3.73 per match)

The 2000–01 Macedonian Football Cup was the 9th season of Macedonia's football knockout competition. Sloga Jugomagnat were the defending champions, having won their second title the year before after reaching their fifth Final in a row. The 2000–01 champions were Pelister who beat the defending champions to claim their first title after twice been runners-up in the first 2 Macedonian Cups in 1992–93 & 1993–94.

== Competition calendar ==
Round	Date(s)	Fixtures	Clubs	New entries
First Round	12, 13, 14 August & 20 September 2000	16	32 → 16	32
Second Round	8, 29 November 2000	16	16 → 8	none
Quarter-finals	25 February & 4 April 2001	8	8 → 4	none
Semi-finals	17 April & 9 May 2001	4	4 → 2	none
Final	24 May 2001	1	2 → 1	none

== First round ==
Matches were played on 13 August 2000.

Team 1	Score	Team 2
12 August 2000
Vardar	2–1	Makedonija G.P.
13 August 2000
Sasa	1–1 (3–5 p)	Pelister
Tikvesh	0–5	Napredok
Sileks	2–1	Osogovo
Prespa	2–5	Sloga Jugomagnat
Bregalnica Shtip	3–0	11 Oktomvri
Shkëndija HB	1–0	Novaci
Karaorman	3–0	Mesna Industrija
Ohrid Super bingo	0–1	Cementarnica
Bitola	2–2 (6–7 p)	Bashkimi
Kozhuf	0–1	Madjari Solidarnost
Sloga Vinica	3–4	Alumina
Polet	0–14	Belasica
Metalurg Veles	0–3 (w/o)	Borec MHK
14 August 2000
Pobeda	14–0	Arsimi
20 September 2000
Kumanovo	1–2	Rabotnichki Kometal

Source: Dnevnik.mk (archived)

== Second round ==
The first legs were played on 8 November and second were played on 29 November 2000.

Team 1	Agg.	Team 2	1st leg	2nd leg
Sloga Jugomagnat	2–1	Pobeda	2–0	0–1
Pelister	(a) 5–5	Sileks	2–0	3–5
Rabotnichki Kometal	3–3 (1–3 p)	Shkëndija HB	2–1	1–2 (a.e.t.)
Belasica	7–1	Bregalnica Shtip	6–0	1–1
Karaorman	(a) 4–4	Borec MHK	3–0	1–4
Vardar	7–1	Napredok	5–1	2–0
Alumina	2–4	Bashkimi	1–0	1–4
Cementarnica	8–0	Madjari Solidarnost	2–0	6–0

== Quarter-finals ==
The first legs were played on 25 February and second were played on 4 April 2001.

=== Summary ===
Team 1	Agg.	Team 2	1st leg	2nd leg
Pelister	(a) 4–4	Vardar	2–1	2–3
Belasica	1–2	Sloga Jugomagnat	0–1	1–1
Karaorman	3–1	Cementarnica	0–0	3–1
Shkëndija HB	4–1	Bashkimi	2–0	2–1

=== Matches ===
25 February 2001
13:30 CET

Pelister	2–1	Vardar
Dimov 45'; Momirovski 47'	Report	Beganovikj 76'

Stadion Tumbe Kafe, Bitola
Attendance: 5,000
Referee: Angel Bungurov (Kavadarci)
4 April 2001
17:30 CEST

Vardar	3–2	Pelister
Zaharievski 35' (pen.); Bozhinov 78'; Beganovikj 80'	Report	Deliovski 45'; Delovski 90+4'

Gradski stadion, Skopje
Attendance: 2,000
Referee: Sasho Lazarevski (Kumanovo)

4–4 on aggregate. Pelister won on away goals.

25 February 2001
13:30 CET

Belasica	0–1	Sloga Jugomagnat
	Report	Presilski 28'

Stadion Mladost, Strumica
Attendance: 3,000
Referee: Ljubomir Krstevski (Bitola)
4 April 2001
15:30 CEST

Sloga Jugomagnat	1–1	Belasica

Stadion Chair, Skopje
Referee: Bekim Bauta (Struga)

Sloga Jugomagnat won 2–1 on aggregate.

25 February 2001
13:30 CET

Karaorman	0–0	Cementarnica 55
	Report

Gradska Plazha, Struga
Attendance: 300
Referee: Sasho Lazarevski (Kumanovo)
4 April 2001
15:30 CEST

Cementarnica 55	1–3	Karaorman

Stadion Cementarnica, Skopje
Referee: Ljubomir Krstevski (Bitola)

Karaorman won 1–3 on aggregate.

25 February 2001
13:30 CET

Shkëndija HB	2–0	Bashkimi
Osmani 24'; Emini 34'	Report

Gradski stadion, Tetovo
4 April 2001
15:30 CEST

Bashkimi	1–2	Shkëndija HB

Gradski stadion, Kumanovo
Referee: Delcho Jakimovski (Skopje)

Shkëndija HB won 4–1 on aggregate.

== Semi-finals ==
The first legs were played on 18 April 2001. The second legs were originally scheduled for 3 May 2001, but were postponed to 9 May 2001, due to situation at the border with FR Yugoslavia.

=== Summary ===
Team 1	Agg.	Team 2	1st leg	2nd leg
Shkëndija HB	0–6	Sloga Jugomagnat	0–1	0–5
Pelister	4–3	Karaorman	1–2	3–1

=== Matches ===
18 April 2001
16:00 CEST

Shkëndija HB	0–1	Sloga Jugomagnat
	Report	Zdravevski 39'

Gradski stadion, Tetovo
Attendance: 2,500
Referee: Angel Bungurov (Kavadarci)
9 May 2001
16:30 CEST

Sloga Jugomagnat	5–0	Shkëndija HB
Nuhiji 12'; Arif 67'; Stankovski 20', 78'; Presilski 35'	Report

Stadion Chair, Skopje
Attendance: 300
Referee: Bekim Bauta (Struga)

Sloga Jugomagnat won 6–0 on aggregate.

18 April 2001
16:00 CEST

Pelister	1–2	Karaorman
Micevski 75'	Report	Nichevski 3', 30'

Stadion Tumbe Kafe, Bitola
Attendance: 2,000
Referee: Delcho Jakimovski (Skopje)
9 May 2001
16:30 CEST

Karaorman	1−3	Pelister
Cvetanoski 80' (pen.)	Report	Dimitrovski 55'; Dimov 85'; Stojkovski 90'

Gradska Plazha, Struga
Attendance: 2,000
Referee: Emil Bozhinovski (Skopje)

Pelister won 4–3 on aggregate.

== Final ==
24 May 2001
19:30 CEST

Sloga Jugomagnat	1–2	Pelister
Stojmenovski 24' (o.g.)	Report 1 Report 2	Micevski 14'; Stojkovski 36'

Gradski stadion, Skopje
Attendance: 5,000
Referee: Bekim Bauta (Struga)

== See also ==
- 2000–01 Macedonian First Football League
- 2000–01 Macedonian Second Football League
