= 2006–07 Macedonian First Football League =

Macedonian First League
- Season: 2006–07
- Dates: 6 August 2006 – 27 May 2007
- Champions: Pobeda; 2nd domestic title
- Relegated: Bregalnica Shtip; Vëllazërimi
- Champions League: Pobeda
- UEFA Cup: Rabotnichki; Vardar
- Intertoto Cup: Makedonija G.P.
- Matches: 198
- Goals: 604 (3.05 per match)
- Top goalscorer: Boban Janchevski (26 goals)
- Biggest home win: Vardar 10–0 Vëllazërimi (15 April 2007)
- Biggest away win: Vëllazërimi 0–5; Makedonija G.P. (17 December 2006 and 18 April 2007); Bregalnica 0–5 Bashkimi (24 September 2006)
- Highest scoring: Vardar 10–0 Vëllazërimi (15 April 2007)

The 2006–07 Macedonian First League was the 15th season of the Macedonian First Football League, the highest football league of Macedonia. The first matches of the season were played on 6 August 2006 and the last on 27 May 2007. Rabotnichki were the defending champions, having won their second title. The 2006-07 champions were Pobeda who had won their second title.

== Promotion and relegation ==
At the start of the 2006–07 season

Promoted from 2005–06 Second League

- Pelister (winners)
- Napredok (runners-up)

Relegated to 2006–07 Second League

- Cementarnica 55 (11th)
- Belasica (12th)

At the end of the 2006–07 season

Promoted from 2006–07 Second League

- Milano (winners)
- Cementarnica 55 (runners-up)

Relegated to 2007–08 Second League

- Bregalnica Kraun (11th)
- Vëllazërimi (12th)

== Participating teams ==
Location of teams in 2006–07 Macedonian First League

Club	City	Stadium	Capacity
Bashkimi	Kumanovo	Gradski stadion Kumanovo	7,000
Bregalnica Kraun	Shtip	Gradski stadion Shtip	4,000
Makedonija G.P.	Skopje	Stadion Gjorche Petrov	3,000
Napredok	Kichevo	Gradski stadion Kichevo	5,000
Pelister	Bitola	Stadion Tumbe Kafe	8,000
Pobeda	Prilep	Stadion Goce Delchev	15,000
Rabotnichki Kometal	Skopje	Gradski stadion Skopje	18,104
Renova	Djepchishte	Gradski stadion Tetovo	15,000
Shkëndija 79	Tetovo	Gradski stadion Tetovo	15,000
Sileks	Kratovo	Stadion Sileks	5,000
Vardar	Skopje	Gradski stadion Skopje	18,104
Vëllazërimi	Kichevo	Gradski stadion Kichevo	5,000

== League table ==
Pos	Team	Pld	W	D	L	GF	GA	GD	Pts	Qualification or relegation
1	Pobeda (C)	33	21	8	4	73	42	+31	71	Qualification for the Champions League first qualifying round
2	Rabotnichki Kometal	33	19	10	4	75	25	+50	67	Qualification for the UEFA Cup first qualifying round
3	Makedonija G.P.	33	18	10	5	65	29	+36	64	Qualification for the Intertoto Cup first round
4	Vardar	33	17	8	8	63	34	+29	59	Qualification for the UEFA Cup first qualifying round (Note: Vardar qualified for the UEFA Cup first qualifying round by winning the 2006–07 Macedonian Football Cup.)
5	Renova	33	17	8	8	54	31	+23	59	
6	Pelister	33	14	3	16	37	32	+5	45	
7	Napredok	33	12	9	12	50	47	+3	45	
8	Bashkimi	33	12	6	15	54	60	−6	42	
9	Sileks (O)	33	12	5	16	54	50	+4	41	Qualification for the relegation playoff
10	Shkëndija (O)	33	10	8	15	39	63	−24	38	Qualification for the relegation playoff
11	Bregalnica Kraun (R)	33	3	4	26	19	97	−78	13	Relegation to the Macedonian Second League
12	Vëllazërimi (R)	33	2	3	28	22	95	−73	9	Relegation to the Macedonian Second League

Source: MacedonianFootball.com, RSSSF.org
Rules for classification: 1) Points; 2) Goal difference; 3) Goals scored; 4) Head-to-head points; 5) Head-to-head goal difference; 6) Head-to-head away goals scored (only if two teams); 7) Head-to-head goals scored; 8) Draw; 9) Play-off. (Note: Criteria 2, 3 and 8 is only used if not deciding Champion, teams for UEFA competitions or relegation).
(C) Champions; (O) Play-off winners; (R) Relegated

== Results ==
Every team will play three times against each other team for a total of 33 matches. The first 22 matchdays will consist of a regular double round-robin schedule. The league standings at this point will then be used to determine the games for the last 11 matchdays.

Home \ Away	BAS	BRE	MGP	NAP	PEL	POB	RAB	REN	SKE	SIL	VAR	VLZ	BAS	BRE	MGP	NAP	PEL	POB	RAB	REN	SKE	SIL	VAR	VLZ
Bashkimi	—	8–1	2–2	2–1	1–2	2–2	1–3	0–3	6–1	1–0	0–3 (Note: Match abandoned at the half-time after was Vardar's players been attacked in front of the locker room. Later, the match was awarded to Vardar.)	2–0	—	2–1	—	—	1–0	—	0–0	—	—	1–4	4–1	—
Bregalnica Kraun	0–5	—	2–3	1–2	0–4	1–1	0–3	1–0	0–3	0–2	0–3	5–1	—	—	—	—	0–1	—	0–3	—	1–2	—	0–2	2–1
Makedonija	1–1	3–0	—	2–1	2–0	0–0	3–0	1–1	2–0	3–1	0–2	3–0	3–0	4–0	—	2–1	2–0	—	—	—	—	2–0	1–1	—
Napredok	1–0	7–0	1–0	—	0–0	2–2	0–0	1–1	2–2	2–0	1–3	3–0 (Note: Match abandoned at the 34th minute by the result 1–0 due to the attack on the referee Marjan Markovski by the Vëllazërimi's players Vlatko Novakov, Burim Zulbeari and Agron Demiri. Later, the match was awarded to Napredok.)	4–0	2–0	—	—	—	—	—	—	2–1	2–0	5–3	3–1
Pelister	2–0	3–0	0–1	2–2	—	1–0	2–0	1–2	3–0	1–0	1–2	1–0	—	—	—	2–0	—	—	0–2	0–1	2–1	—	1–2	2–0
Pobeda	3–2	3–1	1–1	3–2	2–1	—	1–1	1–0	4–2	1–0	3–2	3–0	5–1	4–1	1–0	4–0	3–1	—	—	—	—	3–2	—	—
Rabotnichki	3–2	8–0	3–2	4–0	1–0	2–0	—	3–0	5–1	6–2	1–1	5–0	—	—	3–3	0–0	—	1–2	—	1–1	—	—	—	5–0
Renova	2–2	3–0	0–2	0–0	1–0	2–3	1–1	—	1–2	3–0	3–0	3–0	2–0	4–0	2–0	2–0	—	4–3	—	—	—	2–1	—	—
Shkëndija	2–0	3–1	2–2	2–1	0–1	1–1	1–1	1–5	—	2–1	0–2	2–0	1–1	—	1–1	—	—	0–2	—	2–1	—	—	—	4–2
Sileks	0–1	4–0	1–2	3–3	2–0	2–2	2–1	3–0	0–0	—	3–2	1–1	—	3–0	—	—	2–1	—	0–1	—	6–0	—	2–2	—
Vardar	3–0	1–1	2–2	5–1	2–1	2–1	0–2	1–1	0–0	0–1	—	3–0	—	—	—	2–0	—	2–3	0–0	0–1	1–0	—	—	10–0
Vëllazërimi	2–3	0–0	0–5	1–3	0–1	2–4	0–3	1–1	3–0	2–1	0–1	—	2–3	—	0–5	—	—	1–2	—	0–1	—	2–5	—	—

Source: RSSSF.org
Legend: Blue = home team win; Yellow = draw; Red = away team win.

== Relegation playoff ==
3 June 2007

Sileks	2–1	Skopje
Natkov 55'; Pavlović 60'		Markovski 90'

Stadion Tumbe Kafe, Bitola

24 June 2007

Shkëndija 79	3–0 (Awarded)	Teteks

Gradski stadion, Tetovo

== Top goalscorers ==
Rank	Player	Club	Goals
1	(North Macedonia) Boban Janchevski	Bashkimi & Renova	26
2	(North Macedonia) Blagoja Geshoski	Pobeda	19
3	(North Macedonia) Dušan Savić	Pobeda	16
4	(North Macedonia) Stevica Ristić	Sileks	14
4	(Bosnia and Herzegovina) Boško Stupić	Sileks	14
6	(North Macedonia) Argjend Beqiri	Renova	13
6	(North Macedonia) Goran Stankovski	Rabotnichki	13
6	(North Macedonia) Goce Toleski	Renova	13
9	(North Macedonia) Burhan Emurlahu	Shkëndija & Vardar	12
9	(Brazil) (North Macedonia) Wandeir	Vardar	12

Source: Macedonian Football (in English)

== See also ==
- 2006–07 Macedonian Football Cup
- 2006–07 Macedonian Second Football League
