= Gjore Jovanovski =

Macedonian footballer (born 1956)

Personal information
- Full name: Gjorgji Jovanovski; Ѓорѓи Јовановски
- Date of birth: 22 March 1956 (age 70)
- Place of birth: Skopje, PR Macedonia, FPR Yugoslavia
- Position: Midfielder

Senior career*
| Years | Team | Apps | (Gls) |
| 1974–1977 | Vardar | 53 | (1) |
| 1977–1978 | Red Star Belgrade | 1 | (0) |
| 1978–1986 | Vardar | 216 | (9) |
| 1986–1988 | Samsunspor | 65 | (0) |
| 1988–1989 | Ankaragücü | 13 | (0) |
| Total | | 348 | (10) |

Managerial career
- 1998–1999: Vardar
- 1999–2001: Sloga Jugomagnat
- 2001–2002: Macedonia
- 2002: Samsunspor
- 2003–2007: Rabotnichki
- 2007–2008: Milano Kumanovo
- 2008–2009: Metalurg Skopje
- 2010: CSKA Sofia
- 2011: Rabotnichki
- 2013: Shkëndija
- 2014: Bregalnica Shtip
- 2018: Rabotnichki
- 2021: FK Belasica
- 2023–2024: Al-Batin U19
- 2024: Al-Batin
- * Club domestic league appearances and goals

Gjorgji "Gjore" Jovanovski^{[a]} (Macedonian: Ѓорѓи "Ѓоре" Јовановски; born 22 March 1956) is a Macedonian football manager and former player.

== Playing career ==
As a player, he played for FK Vardar and Red Star Belgrade in the Yugoslav First League and for Turkish club Samsunspor and Ankaragücü.

== Coaching career ==
He had previously coached FK Vardar, FK Sloga Jugomagnat winning three championships and one cup title. After FK Rabotnichki Kometal winning two championship and qualified in the third round qualification for UEFA Champion League (eliminated by Lille/France)before moving to FK Milano Kumanovo and FK Metalurg Skopje. He was also a Head coach of Macedonian national team from 2001 till 2002. He was chosen three times for the award of the "best football coach in Macedonia" by Sport radio 90.3 fm having been one of the best coaches in Macedonia winning five league and two cup titles. He was also the head coach of the Macedonian national team from 2001 to 2002.

On 17 August 2010, Jovanovski was announced as the manager of CSKA Sofia. He qualified with CSKA Sofia in UEFA Europa League group stages

On 21 October 2010, Jovanovski was removed from his position of head coach of CSKA Sofia, after a 0:2 home loss against Rapid Vienna in a UEFA Europa League

On 8 November 2011, Jovanovski was named as manager of FK Rabotnichki but after only two months as the manager, the club board and he agreed to mutually terminate his contract on 28 December 2011.

On 25 September 2023, Jovanovski was appointed as manager of Al-Batin's U19 team. On 1 March 2024, Jovanovski was appointed as the manager of the first-team after the sacking of Quim Machado.

== Managerial statistics ==
As of 22 July 2019

Managerial record by team and tenure
| Team | From | To | Record | | | | |
| Team | From | To | G | W | D | L | Win % |
|---|---|---|---|---|---|---|---|
| Vardar | 1998 | 1999 | 26 | 15 | 4 | 7 | 57.69 |
| Sloga Jugomagnat | 1999 | 2001 | 52 | 38 | 10 | 4 | 73.08 |
| Macedonia | 2001 | 2002 | | | | | |
| Samsunspor | 2002 | 2002 | | | | | |
| Rabotnički | 2003 | 2007 | 132 | 78 | 28 | 26 | 59.09 |
| Milano Kumanovo | 2007 | 2008 | 41 | 27 | 4 | 10 | 65.85 |
| Metalurg Skopje | 2008 | 2009 | 30 | 6 | 11 | 13 | 20.00 |
| Al-Batin | 2024 | 2024 | 8 | 4 | 2 | 2 | 50.00 |
| Total | | | 288 | 168 | 59 | 61 | 58.33 |

== Honours ==
- FK Sloga Jugomagnat
  - Macedonian Football Cup: 1
    - Winner: 2003–04
- FK Rabotnichki Skopje
  - Macedonian First League: 2
    - Winner: 2004–05, 2005–06
    - Runner-up: 2006–07

== Notes ==
| a. | Macedonian spelling: Ǵorǵi "Ǵore" Jovanovski, Ѓopѓи "Ѓope" Joвaнoвcки, Romanized spelling: Đorđe Jovanovski. |
