= 2006–07 Macedonian Football Cup =

Tournament details
- Country: Macedonia
- Dates: 30 July 2006 – 24 May 2007
- Teams: 32

Final positions
- Champions: Vardar (5th title)
- Runners-up: Pobeda

Tournament statistics
- Matches played: 44
- Goals scored: 142 (3.23 per match)

The 2006–07 Macedonian Football Cup was the 15th season of Macedonia's football knockout competition. Makedonija G.P. were the defending champions, having won their first title. The 2006–07 champions were Vardar who won their fifth title.

== Competition calendar ==
Round	Date(s)	Fixtures	Clubs	New entries
First Round	30 July 2006	16	32 → 16	32
Second Round	20 September & 18 October 2006	16	16 → 8	none
Quarter-finals	1, 29 November 2006	8	8 → 4	none
Semi-finals	11 April & 2 May 2007	4	4 → 2	none
Final	24 May 2007	1	2 → 1	none

== First round ==
Matches were played on 30 July 2006.

Team 1	Score	Team 2
30 July 2006
Tikvesh (3)	0–5	Makedonija G.P. (1)
Babuna (3)	0–6	Madjari Solidarnost (2)
Lokomotiva (3)	1–6	Renova (1)
Ilinden Velmej (2)	2–1	Sileks (1)
Tiverija (3)	0–6	Pelister (1)
Osogovo (3)	0–2	Bashkimi (1)
Bregalnica Delchevo (3)	0–3 (w/o)^{1}	Shkëndija 79 (1)
Metalurg (2)	3–0	Belasica (2)
Drita (3)	0–0 (5–3 p)	Karaorman (2)
11 Oktomvri (3)	0–6	Vardar (1)
Novaci (3)	0–2	Rabotnichki Kometal (1)
Teteks (2)	2–2 (3–4 p)	Bregalnica Kraun (1)
Gostivar (3)	2–1	Napredok (1)
Turnovo (2)	1–3	Pobeda (1)
Milano (2)	2–1	Vëllazërimi (1)
Dojransko Ezero (3)	2–3	Meridian FCU (2)

^{1}Interrupted at 0–2. Match awarded to Shkëndija 79.

== Second round ==
The draw was held on 18 August 2006 in Skopje. The first legs were played on 20 September and second were played on 18 October 2006.

Team 1	Agg.	Team 2	1st leg	2nd leg
Pobeda (1)	3–0	Shkëndija 79 (1)	2–0	1–0
Vardar (1)	5–1	Metalurg (2)	4–1	1–0
Drita (3)	4–2	Bregalnica Kraun (1)	3–0	1–2
Gostivar (3)	3–6	Renova (1)	1–4	2–2
Milano (2)	4–3	Bashkimi (1)	2–1	2–2
Rabotnichki Kometal (1)	5–4	Ilinden Velmej (2)	4–0	1–4
Makedonija G.P. (1)	0–2	Meridian FCU (2)	0–2	0–0
Madjari Solidarnost (2)	2–4	Pelister (1)	2–2	0–2

== Quarter-finals ==
The draw was held on 20 October 2006 in Skopje. The first legs were played on 1 November and second were played on 29 November 2006.

=== Summary ===
Team 1	Agg.	Team 2	1st leg	2nd leg
Vardar (1)	4–2	Meridian FCU (2)	4–1	0–1
Rabotnichki Kometal (1)	1–2	Milano (2)	1–1	0–1
Drita (3)	3–7	Pobeda (1)	2–1	1–6
Pelister (1)	(a) 2–2	Renova (1)	0–1	2–1

=== Matches ===
1 November 2006
10:00 CET

Vardar (1)	4–1	Meridian FCU (2)
Wandeir 54', 70', 88'; Kostovski 64'	Report	Belchev 49'

Gradski stadion, Skopje
Attendance: 500
Referee: Aleksandar Stavrev (Skopje)
29 November 2006
13:00 CET

Meridian FCU (2)	1–0	Vardar (1)
Toleski 45' (pen.)	Report

Stadion Cementarnica, Skopje
Referee: Dimitar Mechkarovski (Skopje)

Vardar won 4–2 on aggregate.

1 November 2006
13:00 CET

Rabotnichki (1)	1–1	Milano (2)
Nexhipi 37'	Report	Osmani 17'

Gradski stadion, Skopje
Attendance: 300
Referee: Zorancho Temelkov (Kavadarci)
29 November 2006
13:00 CET

Milano (2)	1–0	Rabotnichki (1)
Nuhiji 68'	Report

Gradski stadion, Kumanovo
Attendance: 4,500
Referee: Zorancho Temelkov (Kavadarci)

Milano won 2–1 on aggregate.

1 November 2006
13:00 CET

Drita (3)	2–1	Pobeda (1)
Ismaili 3'; Imeri 72'	Report	Meglenski 13'

Gradski stadion, Tetovo
Attendance: 500
Referee: Dejan Jakimovski (Skopje)
29 November 2006
13:00 CET

Pobeda (1)	6–1	Drita (3)
Tanchevski; Geshoski	Report	Mustafi

Stadion Goce Delchev, Prilep
Referee: Zoran Petkovski (Veles)

Pobeda won 7–3 on aggregate.

1 November 2006
13:00 CET

Pelister (1)	0–1	Renova (1)
	Report	Ignjatovski 30'

Stadion Tumbe Kafe, Bitola
Attendance: 200
Referee: Dragan Stojanovski (Bitola)
29 November 2006
13:00 CET

Renova (1)	1–2	Pelister (1)
Beqiri 21'	Report	Delovski 38'; Stisnioski 90'

Gradski stadion, Tetovo
Referee: Aleksandar Stavrev (Skopje)

2–2 on aggregate. Pelister won on away goals.

== Semi-finals ==
The draw was held on 5 December 2006 in Skopje. The first legs were played on 11 April and the second on 2 May 2007.

=== Summary ===
Team 1	Agg.	Team 2	1st leg	2nd leg
Pobeda (1)	3–1	Milano (2)	2–1	1–0
Vardar (1)	3–2	Pelister (1)	2–1	1–1

=== Matches ===
11 April 2007
16:00 CEST

Pobeda (1)	2–1	Milano (2)
Meglenski 1' (pen.); Nacev 10'		Gligorovski 5'

Stadion Goce Delchev, Prilep
Referee: Ljubomir Krstevski (Bitola)
2 May 2007
16:00 CEST

Milano (2)	0−1	Pobeda (1)
	Report	Nacev 84'

Gradski stadion, Kumanovo
Attendance: 6,000
Referee: Dimitar Mechkarovski (Skopje)

Pobeda won 3–1 on aggregate.

11 April 2007
16:00 CEST

Vardar (1)	2–1	Pelister (1)
Wandeir 3'; Demiri 67'		Dimov 80'

Stadion Mladost, Strumica
Referee: Goran Spirkoski (Prilep)
2 May 2007
16:00 CEST

Pelister (1)	1−1	Vardar (1)
Momirovski 85'	Report	Ristevski 21'

Stadion Tumbe Kafe, Bitola
Attendance: 4,000
Referee: Goran Spirkoski (Prilep)

Vardar won 3–2 on aggregate.

== Final ==
24 May 2007
20:15 CEST

Pobeda (1)	1–2	Vardar (1)
Nacev 72'	Report 1 Report 2	Kirovski 22'; Wandeir 27'

Gradski stadion, Skopje
Attendance: 5,500
Referee: Aleksandar Stavrev (Skopje)

== See also ==
- 2006–07 Macedonian First Football League
- 2006–07 Macedonian Second Football League
