= 2006–07 Macedonian Second Football League =

Macedonian Second League
- Season: 2006–07
- Champions: Milano
- Promoted: Milano; Cementarnica
- Relegated: None

The 2006–07 Macedonian Second Football League was the fifteenth season since its establishment. It began on 5 August 2006 and ended on 26 May 2007.

== Participating teams ==
Location of teams in 2006–07 Macedonian Second League

Club	City	Stadium	Capacity
Belasica	Strumica	Stadion Mladost	6,370
Cementarnica 55	Skopje	Stadion Cementarnica	2,000
Ilinden	Velmej	Stadion Velmej	
Karaorman	Struga	Stadion Gradska Plazha	500
Madjari Solidarnost	Skopje	Stadion Boris Trajkovski	3,000
Metalurg	Skopje	Stadion Zhelezarnica	3,000
Milano	Kumanovo	Gradski stadion Kumanovo	1,000
Skopje	Skopje	Stadion Avtokomanda	4,000
Sloga Jugomagnat	Skopje	Chair Stadium	6,000
Teteks	Tetovo	Gradski stadion Tetovo	15,000
Turnovo	Turnovo	Stadion Kukush	1,500
Vardar Dekamel	Negotino	Gradski stadion Negotino	1,500

== League table ==
Pos	Team	Pld	W	D	L	GF	GA	GD	Pts	Promotion
1	Milano (C, P)	33	21	6	6	74	31	+43	69	Promotion to Macedonian First League
2	Cementarnica 55 (P)	33	16	11	6	53	24	+29	59	Promotion to Macedonian First League
3	Teteks	33	16	6	11	48	32	+16	54	Qualification to Promotion play-off
4	Skopje	33	13	10	10	32	21	+11	49	Qualification to Promotion play-off
5	Turnovo	33	12	9	12	36	41	−5	45	
6	Sloga Jugomagnat	33	12	7	14	48	46	+2	43	
7	Metalurg	33	10	13	10	38	37	+1	43	
8	Madjari Solidarnost	33	10	12	11	35	33	+2	42	
9	Belasica	33	11	7	15	36	59	−23	40	
10	Karaorman	33	12	3	18	37	50	−13	39	
11	Vardar Dekamel	33	9	6	18	26	56	−30	33	
12	Ilinden Velmej (Note: Ilinden Velmej was deducted six points.)	33	5	12	16	30	63	−33	21	

Source: MacedonianFootball.com, RSSSF.org
Rules for classification: 1) Points; 2) Head-to-head points; 3) Head-to-head goal difference; 4) Head-to-head away goals scored
(C) Champions; (P) Promoted

== Results ==
Every team will play three times against each other team for a total of 33 matches. The first 22 matchdays will consist of a regular double round-robin schedule. The league standings at this point will then be used to determine the games for the last 11 matchdays.

=== Matches 1–22 ===
Home \ Away	BEL	CEM	ILI	KAR	MAS	MET	MIL	SKO	SLO	TET	TUR	VDK
Belasica	—	1–6	3–0	0–2	2–1	2–2	0–3	0–1	3–1	0–1	0–0	1–1
Cementarnica 55	0–1	—	1–1	3–0	0–0	1–0	2–1	1–0	3–2	2–1	2–0	6–0
Ilinden Velmej	1–1	0–0	—	0–3	0–3	1–1	0–1	0–0	1–0	4–2	3–3	1–2
Karaorman	0–2	1–4	3–1	—	1–2	1–1	1–2	1–1	2–0	2–1	2–0	1–0
Madjari Solidarnost	1–1	0–0	1–1	0–1	—	1–1	1–2	0–0	1–1	1–0	1–1	2–0
Metalurg	4–0	0–0	4–1	3–2	1–3	—	0–0	1–1	2–1	1–0	0–0	3–0
Milano	5–0	2–1	2–2	4–1	5–0	3–0	—	2–0	3–1	3–2	4–1	1–1
Skopje	2–1	1–0	0–0	3–0	0–0	0–0	0–0	—	2–1	1–0	3–0	3–0
Sloga Jugomagnat	3–1	1–1	1–0	1–0	1–1	1–2	2–4	2–1	—	2–0	0–0	3–1
Teteks	0–0	1–2	6–1	1–0	2–1	2–2	1–1	1–0	3–1	—	3–0	5–0
Turnovo	1–0	0–2	2–0	1–1	0–0	3–2	0–2	2–1	1–0	0–1	—	4–0
Vardar Dekamel	0–5	0–0	3–1	1–0	1–3	2–1	0–2	0–0	2–1	0–1	0–1	—

Source: RSSSF.org
Legend: Blue = home team win; Yellow = draw; Red = away team win.

=== Matches 23–33 ===
Home \ Away	BEL	CEM	ILI	KAR	MAS	MET	MIL	SKO	SLO	TET	TUR	VDK
Belasica	—	0–2	—	1–0	2–1	—	—	1–0	—	—	—	2–2
Cementarnica 55	—	—	1–1	2–0	—	3–0	—	—	1–1	1–2	2–2	—
Ilinden Velmej	2–3	—	—	—	—	2–2	0–1	—	—	0–3	—	1–0
Karaorman	—	—	1–2	—	—	1–0	3–2	—	2–1	2–0	—	—
Madjari Solidarnost	—	0–1	0–1	2–1	—	—	—	1–0	1–2	—	4–0	—
Metalurg	0–1	—	—	—	0–0	—	2–0	—	—	0–0	2–1	1–0
Milano	7–0	2–2	—	—	1–2	—	—	1–0	—	—	2–1	4–1
Skopje	—	2–1	5–1	2–0	—	1–0	—	—	1–1	—	1–0	—
Sloga Jugomagnat	4–2	—	4–0	—	—	3–0	3–2	—	—	1–1	—	—
Teteks	3–0	—	—	—	2–1	—	1–0	2–0	—	—	0–3	0–0
Turnovo	3–0	—	1–1	3–2	—	—	—	—	1–0	—	—	1–0
Vardar Dekamel	—	1–0	—	4–0	2–0	—	—	1–0	1–2	—	—	—

Source: RSSSF.org
Legend: Blue = home team win; Yellow = draw; Red = away team win.

== Promotion playoff ==
3 June 2007

Sileks	2–1	Skopje
Natkov 55'; Pavlović 60'		Markovski 90'

Stadion Tumbe Kafe, Bitola

24 June 2007

Shkëndija 79	3–0 (Awarded)	Teteks

Gradski stadion, Tetovo

== Relegation playoff ==
Alumina	0–3 (Awarded)	Ohrid 2004

Gradski stadion, Kichevo

Miravci	3–0 (Awarded)	Nov Milenium

Drita	3–0 (Awarded)	Karaorman

Lokomotiva	2–0	Korab

Stadion Mladost, Strumica

Note: After the play-off chaos, the Football Federation of Macedonia was decided that no teams were relegated from the Second League and the all 5 winners from the Third League were promoted. In addition, the FFM was decided will be played an additional play-off match between the two second placed team from the Northern group of the Third League, Lokomotiva and the second placed from the Southwestern group Korabi and the winner Lokomotiva was promoted to the Second League.

== See also ==
- 2006–07 Macedonian Football Cup
- 2006–07 Macedonian First Football League
