= Júnior (footballer, born 1985) =

Brazilian footballer

Alessandro Machado Júnior Sousa (born 10 December 1985), known as Júnior, is a Brazilian professional footballer who last played as a forward for FC Banants in the Armenian Premier League.

Júnior played for Litex Lovech during the Bulgarian A PFG 2006–07 season. During the 2008–09 season he played with FK Pelister in the Macedonian First League. Afterwards, he played with Armenian FC Banants he scored three league goals during the 2010 season.
