= Thiha Zaw =

Burmese footballer (born 1993)

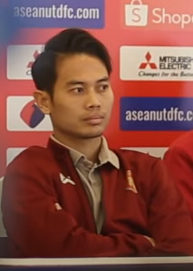
- Thiha Zaw in 2024

Personal information
- Full name: Thiha Zaw
- Date of birth: 28 December 1993 (age 32)
- Place of birth: Yangon, Myanmar
- Height: 1.72 m (5 ft 8 in)
- Position: Forward

Team information
- Current team: Dagon Star United
- Number: 90

Senior career*
Years	Team	Apps	(Gls)
2012–2020	Ayeyawady United	56	(18)
2021	Shan United		
2022–2023	Koh Kong	16	(15)
2023–2024	Prey Veng	26	(9)
2024–2025	Nagaworld	27	(7)
2025–2026	Immigration		

International career^{‡}
2013–2016	Myanmar U23	7	(1)
2015–	Myanmar	8	(3)
- * Club domestic league appearances and goals as of 1 August 2025 ‡ National team caps and goals as of 29 August 2017

Thiha Zaw (born 28 December 1993) is a Burmese professional footballer who plays as a forward. He is part of the Myanmar national team.

== Club career ==
Thiha Zaw has played at club level in the 2012 AFC Cup, 2013 AFC Cup, 2014 AFC Cup, 2015 AFC Cup and 2016 AFC Cup.

=== Immigration ===
In August 2025, Thiha signed contract with Immigration club to face the 2025–26 Malaysia Super League.

== Career statistics ==
=== Club ===
Appearances and goals by club team and year
Club team	Year	Apps	Goals	Assists
Prey Veng	2023–24	25	9	13
Total		25	9	13

=== International ===
As of match played 29 August 2017

Appearances and goals by national team and year
National team	Year	Apps	Goals
Myanmar	2015	5	1
Myanmar	2017	1	0
Total		6	1

International goals

#	Date	Venue	Opponent	Score	Result	Competition	Reference
1.	9 September 2015	Thuwunna Stadium, Yangon	New Zealand	1–1	1–1	Friendly	
2.	14 November 2024	Singapore National Stadium, Singapore	Singapore	1–2	3–2	Friendly	
3.	19 November 2024	Thuwunna Stadium, Yangon	Lebanon	1–1	2–3	Friendly	

== Honours ==
Ayeyawady United

- MFF Cup: 2012, 2014, 2015
- MFF Charity Cup: 2012, 2014, 2015
