= Naing Lin Oo =

Burmese footballer

Personal information
- Full name: Naing Lin Oo
- Date of birth: 15 January 1986 (age 40)
- Place of birth: Kyaiklat, Myanmar
- Position: Midfielder

Team information
- Current team: Thitsar Arman
- Number: 18

Senior career*
Years	Team	Apps	(Gls)
2009–2020	Ayeyawady United		
2023–2024	Dagon Port		
2024–	Thitsar Arman		

International career^{‡}
2012–	Myanmar	7	(0)
2012	Myanmar U-22	5	(1)
- * Club domestic league appearances and goals ‡ National team caps and goals as of May 8, 2015

Naing Lin Oo (Burmese: နိုင်လင်းဦး; born 15 January 1986) is a footballer from Burma, and a midfielder for Thitsar Arman. He played for Myanmar U-22 in 2013 AFC U-22 Asian Cup qualification He currently plays for Ayeyawady United in Myanmar National League.

== Honours ==
=== Club ===
Ayeyawady United

- MFF Cup (2): 2012, 2014
- 2015 General Aung San Shield:
