= Čkembari =

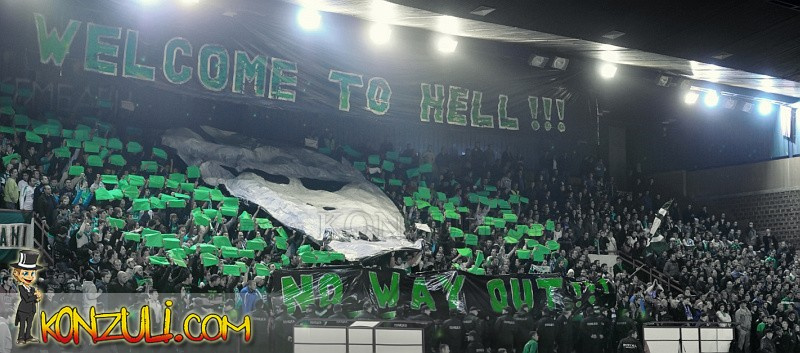
- Čkembari in 2011, supporting RK Eurofarm Pelister in an EHF Cup Winners' Cup match against HC Meshkov Brest
- Established: 25 September 1985
- Type: Supporters' group
- Team: FK Pelister; RK Eurofarm Pelister; KK Pelister
- Location: Bitola, North Macedonia
- Arena: Petar Miloševski Stadium; Sports Hall Boro Čurlevski
- Stand: North Stand
- Coordinates: 41°01′55″N 21°20′05″E
- Colors: Green, white

Čkembari (Macedonian: Чкембари) are a supporters' group, established in 1985, who support the sports clubs from Bitola, North Macedonia, that compete under the Pelister banner. Mainly, FK Pelister in football, RK Eurofarm Pelister in handball and KK Pelister in basketball.

== History ==
Čkembari was established on 25 September 1985 in Yugoslav Macedonia. The group is based in Bitola and supports clubs under the "Pelister" banner.
