= Vančo Micevski =

Macedonian footballer (born 1971)

Personal information
- Date of birth: 28 August 1971 (age 55)
- Place of birth: Skopje, SR Macedonia, SFRY
- Height: 1.78 m (5 ft 10 in)
- Position: Striker

Senior career*
Years	Team	Apps	(Gls)
1989–1990	Rabotnički		
1990–1994	Pelister		
1994–1996	Sileks		
1996–1998	Mechelen		
1998–1999	Union Berlin	17	(4)
1999–2001	Pelister	54	(31)
2001–2003	Pobeda	18	(4)
2003–2005	Madžari Solidarnost	28	(19)
2005–2007	Pelister		

International career
1993–1998	Macedonia	8	(4)
- * Club domestic league appearances and goals

Vančo Micevski (Macedonian: Ванчо Мицевски; born 28 August 1971) is a former Macedonian professional footballer who played as a striker. Since January 2022 he is the Director of Sports of Pelister. Born in SFR Yugoslavia, he represented the Macedonia national team internationally.

== Club career ==
Micevski was born in Skopje, SFR Yugoslavia. He began his career with Rabotnichki. The following years he moved to Pelister and Sileks where he had his most successful spell as a player. Micevski has scored 128 goals in Macedonian first league and he is second top scorer in the history of Macedonian League

In the 1996–97 season he was playing his club football for Sileks Kratovo, and was transferred in the winter break to KV Mechelen in Belgium. Following a short spell with Union Berlin he returned by the 1999–2000 season to be playing back in Macedonia for Pelister and scored a goal in their cup final victory over Sloga Jugomagnat. Later on his career he went on to play for Madžari before finishing his playing career with Pelister in 2007.

== International career ==
Micevski made eight international appearances for the Macedonia national team between October 1993 and June 1997. He scored four international goals during his international career against Albania, Liechtenstein and Malta.

== Career statistics ==
Scores and results list Macedonia's goal tally first, score column indicates score after each Micevski goal.

List of international goals scored by Vančo Micevski
No.	Date	Venue	Opponent	Score	Result	Competition
1	14 May 1994	Gradski stadion Tetovo, Tetovo, Macedonia	Albania		5–1	Friendly
2	14 May 1994	Gradski stadion Tetovo, Tetovo, Macedonia	Albania		5–1	Friendly
3	9 November 1996	Sportpark Eschen-Mauren, Eschen, Liechtenstein	Liechtenstein		11–1	1998 FIFA World Cup qualification
4	27 November 1996	Ta' Qali National Stadium, Ta' Qali, Malta	Malta		2–0	Friendly

== Honours ==
- Macedonian First League: 1995–96, 1996–97
- Macedonian Cup: 1996–97, 2000–01
- Macedonian Republic Cup: 1990-91
- Macedonian First League Top Scorer: 1996–97
