= Sašo Zdravevski =

Macedonian footballer

Personal information
- Full name: Sašo Zdravevski
- Date of birth: 11 August 1973 (age 53)
- Place of birth: Bitola, SFR Yugoslavia
- Height: 1.79 m (5 ft 10 in)
- Position: Defender

Senior career*
Years	Team	Apps	(Gls)
1991–1995	Pelister		
1995–1996	Sileks		
1996–1997	Makedonija		
1997–2002	Sloga Jugomagnat	69	(3)
2002–2005	Pobeda	87	(1)
2005–2007	Pelister	28	(0)

International career
2000–2003	Macedonia	6	(0)
- * Club domestic league appearances and goals

Sašo Zdravevski (Macedonian: Сашо Здравевски; born 11 August 1973) is a retired Macedonian football defender, who was last played for FK Pelister.

== International career ==
He made his senior debut for Macedonia in a March 2000 friendly match against Bosnia & Herzegovina and has earned a total of 6 caps, scoring no goals. His final international was an April 2003 friendly against Portugal.

== External sources ==
- Sašo Zdravevski at National-Football-Teams.com
