= Wandeir =

Brazilian footballer

Personal information
- Full name: Wandeir Oliveira dos Santos
- Date of birth: 15 May 1980 (age 46)
- Place of birth: Morada Nova de Minas, Brazil
- Height: 1.77 m (5 ft 10 in)
- Position: Forward

Youth career
- Cruzeiro

Senior career*
Years	Team	Apps	(Gls)
1998–2002	Cruzeiro	5	(1)
2002–2003	Cementarnica	12	(5)
2003–2005	Vardar	57	(36)
2005–2006	Kickers Offenbach	15	(0)
2006–2007	Vardar	22	(12)
2007–2008	Naval	1	(0)
2007–2008	→ Pandurii (loan)	3	(1)
2008–2009	Varzim	6	(0)
2009–2010	Rabotnički	41	(14)
2011	Vardar	14	(1)
2012–2017	São José		
- * Club domestic league appearances and goals

Wandeir Oliveira dos Santos (born 15 May 1980), better known as Wandeir, is a Brazilian former professional footballer who played as a forward.

== Club career ==
Wandeir was born on 15 May 1980 in Morada Nova de Minas, Brazil.

Wandeir started his career with popular Brazilian team Cruzeiro as a young boy from 1998 when he got in the team to 2002. After great performances he was bought by Macedonian team Cementarnica 55 who he helped in 2003 to win the Macedonian Cup. After six months with the club he moved to title contenders Skopje's FK Vardar which he helped them in 2007 to win the Macedonian Cup as he did for Cementarnica 55 four years before. Ahead of the 2005–06 season, he joined Kickers Offenbach, newly promoted to the 2. Bundesliga, but later returned to Vardar. Later he was transferred to Portuguese team Naval. In 2009, he came back to Macedonia to play for Rabotnički. From Rabotnički in 2011 he returned to Vardar and played 14 matches scoring 1 goal.

== International career ==
After playing in Macedonia for five years, Wandeir took Macedonian citizenship and decided to play for the Macedonia national team. He was once called up for Macedonia but never played.

== Honours ==
Cementarnica

- Macedonian Cup: 2002–03

Vardar

- Macedonian Cup: 2006–07

Rabotnički

- Macedonian Cup: 2008–09
