= Dimitar Vodenicharov =

Bulgarian footballer

Personal information
- Full name: Dimitar Petrov Vodenicharov
- Date of birth: 26 December 1987 (age 38)
- Place of birth: Blagoevgrad, Bulgaria
- Height: 1.80 m (5 ft 11 in)
- Position: Forward

Senior career*
Years	Team	Apps	(Gls)
2004–2009	Slavia Sofia	16	(2)
2008–2009	→ Spartak Varna (loan)	34	(4)
2010–2011	Pirin Blagoevgrad	29	(2)
2011–2012	Montana	30	(6)
2013	Lyubimets 2007	6	(1)
2013–2014	Pelister	21	(10)
2014	Vitosha Bistritsa	10	(6)
2015	Conegliano German	12	(7)
2015	Septemvri Sofia	7	(3)
2016	Vitosha Bistritsa	14	(13)
- * Club domestic league appearances and goals as of 1 July 2016

Dimitar Vodenicharov (Bulgarian: Димитър Воденичаров; born 26 December 1987 in Blagoevgrad) is a Bulgarian football striker.

== Career ==
Vodenicharov is a forward who was born in Blagoevgrad, but made his debut in professional football while being part of the Slavia Sofia's squad during the 2004–05 season. On 15 January 2008, he was loaned out to Spartak Varna. On 16 January 2010, he returned to his home town and signed a contract with Pirin Blagoevgrad. In 2014, he is playing in the Macedonian First League for football team Pelister, and is one of the best ones in the crew.
