= Ilir Elmazovski =

Footballer

Personal information
- Full name: Ilir Elmazovski
- Date of birth: 18 November 1979 (age 46)
- Place of birth: Bitola, SFR Yugoslavia
- Position: Defender

Senior career*
Years	Team	Apps	(Gls)
1999–2001	Pelister	41	(3)
2001–2003	Vardar	15	(0)
2003–2007	Bashkimi	67	(6)
2007	Pobeda	0	(0)
2007–2008	Pelister	26	(2)
2008–2012	Shkëndija	28	(1)
2012–2014	Pelister	20	(1)
2014–2016	Mladost CD		
2016–2017	Novaci		

International career^{‡}
2000–2001	Macedonia	2	(0)
- * Club domestic league appearances and goals as of 13 April 2013 ‡ National team caps and goals as of 11 August 2010

Ilir Elmazovski (Macedonian: Илир Елмазовски; Albanian: Ilir Elmazi; born 18 November 1979 in Bitola) is a Macedonian retired football player of Albanian descent who finished his career at FK Novaci in Macedonian Second League.

== International career ==
He made his senior debut for Macedonia in a July 2000 friendly match against Azerbaijan and has earned a total of 2 caps, scoring no goals. His second and final international was a July 2001 friendly against Qatar.
