= FK Pelister =

Pelister
- Full name: Fudbalski klub Pelister (Фудбалски клуб Пелистер)
- Nickname: Зелено-бели / Zeleno-beli (The Green-Whites)
- Short name: Pelister, PEL, FKP
- Founded: 1945; 81 years ago
- Ground: Petar Miloševski Stadium
- Capacity: 8,587 (all-seater)
- Owner: Municipality of Bitola
- Chairman: Dimitar Mitrevski
- Head coach: Borče Hristov
- League: Macedonian Second League
- 2025–26: Macedonian First League, 8th (relegated)
- Website: fcpelister.com.mk
Home colours	Away colours

FK Pelister (Macedonian: ФК Пелистер) is a professional football club based in the city of Bitola, North Macedonia. They are currently competing in the Macedonian Second League and play their games at the Petar Miloševski Stadium.

== History ==
FK Pelister was originally formed in 1924. First under the name "Omladina", which was later changed to "Pelister" and then to "SK Bitola". SK Bitola became champion in 1926. The club reappeared under the old name "Pelister" after World War II liberation in 1945.

Already in 1946 it became champion of the Bitola physical education district, which was part of the 1945-46 Macedonian Republic League. They finished 3rd in the playoffs. That same year, the club merged with "FK Rabotnik", but kept the name Pelister. The club from Bitola won the title once again in 1949–50 and 1950–51. During that time the most influential players were: Georgievski, Dimitrovski, Petrovski, Naumovski, Lazarevski, Sekerdžievski, Avramovski, Nestorov and Eftimovski.

The team played primarily in the lower divisions of the former Yugoslavia and were champions of the Macedonian Republic League on four occasions, along with winning the Macedonian Republic Cup four times in: 1959, 1962, 1985 and 1991. They earned promotion to the Yugoslav Second League group east (that included clubs from Serbia, Montenegro and Macedonia) for the first time in 1974, which was a big success for that generation. Some of the most famous players at the time were: Grbevski, Dukovski, Cvetkovski, Taškov, Bogoevski, Gočevski, Ristevski, Tristovski, Mickovski, Dimovski, Markovski, Upalevski and the manager Stavre Eftimovski. Soon after, they were relegated but made another comeback in 1982 with Mitko Butlevski as chairman and Ivan Čabrinović as manager.

The club played 350 matches and had an overall record of 143 wins, 69 draws and 138 losses in the Yugoslav Second League. The biggest success came in the 1990–91 Yugoslav Cup when they reached the 1/8 final, getting eliminated on away goals by the eventual champion Hajduk Split. Pelister played their final season in the Yugoslav league system in the 1991–92 Yugoslav First League finishing in 15th place.

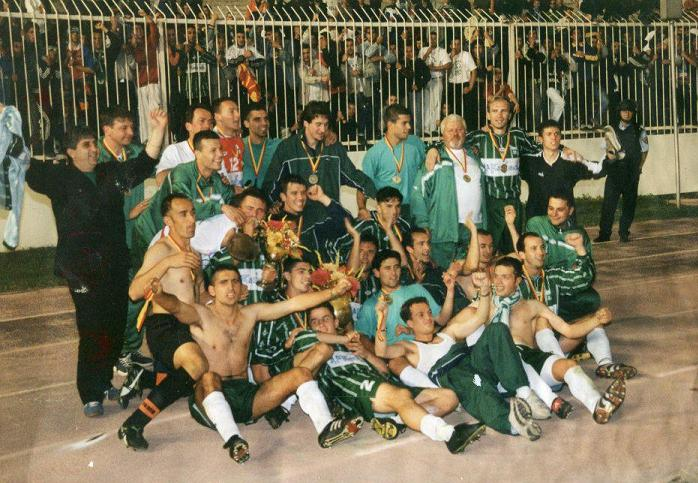
After winning the Cup in 2001.

Following the formation of the First Macedonian Football League, Pelister had early success consistently finishing in the Top 5. They also made it to the Macedonian Cup final the first two seasons coming up short both times. The club became rivals with Vardar Skopje which created the Eternal derby of Macedonia and continued the Pelagonia regional derby with Pobeda Prilep.

In 2000, Pelister became the first team in independent Macedonia to reach the third phase of a European competition. They made it to round three of the 2000 UEFA Intertoto Cup, losing 1–5 on aggregate to one of the winners Celta de Vigo. Finally, the club earned its first major trophy in 2001 by winning the Macedonian Cup, after which they played in the UEFA Cup.

In 2003, the team fell on hard times caused by financial problems and was relegated. A few years later, former players Mitko Stojkovski and Toni Micevski were able to save the club from collapse. After taking over the club they brought instant success with the team winning the 2005–06 Macedonian Second League title. The following year they made a successful comeback to the Macedonian First League and got to the 2006–07 Macedonian Cup semifinal. In the 2007–08 season, the club had its best season to date finishing in 3rd place. Once again, they played in the UEFA Cup where they lost 0–1 on aggregate to APOEL.

Another case of financial difficulties and poor results, once again relegated them back to second division for the 2011–12 season. This time, however, relying mostly on young players from Bitola and led by captain Dragan Dimitrovski, Pelister made an immediate return to the top division, but after the 2014–15 season, the club was once again relegated. This time it happened under the managerial leadership of Gjoko Hadžievski and new owner Cermat, represented by Zoran Ristevski. Under the ownership of Cermat and municipality of Bitola, after being relegated the team has continued to languish in the second division. But, after a following season, the club was again immediately returned to the First League, despite the relegation battle.

In the following season, the club won the 2016–17 Macedonian Cup for the second time and ended up playing in the Europa League, which was the first participation in a European competition since 2008. Unfortunately, this was not an end to the turbulent period for the club, since they were relegated for the fourth time the following season. The problems went deeper as players and board left the club, while facing more financial problems. Despite all that, they still made the final of the 2017–18 Macedonian Football Cup.

== Home Ground ==
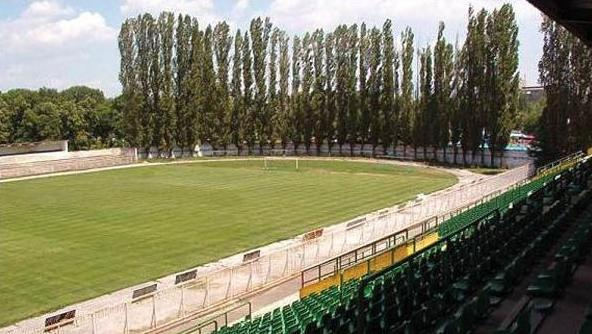
Petar Miloševski stadium

Petar Miloševski stadium has a current capacity of 8,587 seats. The newly built north stand has 4,584 seats, while the renovated south stand has 4,003 seats. The next construction phase will have a running track installed for athletics.

== Colours and crest ==
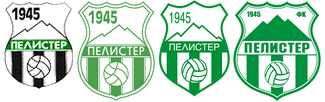
Pelister's crest evolution.

The club colours have traditionally been green and white. The crest is formed in a shape of a shield, at the top left corner it has always had the number 1945 inscribed, which is the year of the club's foundation. In the latest version it includes the Cyrillic letters FK, on the right side. Shape of a mountain forms in the backdrop (to honor the mountain peak Pelister) with the name of the club in the center and a classic leather football underneath it. Early versions of the crest included the colour black, but now the entire badge uses only two colours, green and white.

Prior to the 2016 season, Australian club Pascoe Vale FC (Formerly Pascoe Vale Pelister) announced they would adopt a new logo, inspired by that of FK Pelister, to tie back to their original namesake and immigrant origins.

== Supporters ==
FK Pelister football fan shop in the stadium

Čkembari (Macedonian: Чкембари) are a supporters' group, established on 25 September 1985, who support the Macedonian sports clubs from Bitola that compete under the Pelister banner, mainly FK Pelister in football and RK Pelister in handball. The group was founded when a caravan of 15 buses traveled to support RK Pelister who was playing against Partizan Bjelovar in a handball relegation play-off match.

== Rivalries ==
The club's main rival is FK Vardar from Skopje; their matches are called the Eternal derby of Macedonia. The other significant rival are FK Pobeda in what is known as the Pelagonia derby. It’s a derby between the two best clubs from two cities with fierce rivalry, Bitola and Prilep, both located in the ancient Macedonian province of Pelagonia.

== Honours ==
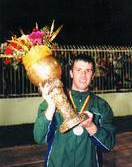
Mitko Stojkovski with the 2001 Macedonian Cup

- (Socialist Republic of Macedonia) Macedonian Republic League
  - Winners (8): 1926, 1950, 1951,1957, 1960, 1961, 1975 and 1982
- (North Macedonia) Macedonian Second League
  - Winners (2): 2005–06 and 2011–12
- (Socialist Republic of Macedonia) Macedonian Republic Cup
  - Winners (4): 1958–59, 1961–62, 1984–85 and 1990–91
- (North Macedonia) Macedonian Football Cup
  - Winners (2): 2000–01 and 2016–17
  - Runners-up (3): 1992–93, 1993–94 and 2017–18

== Recent seasons ==
Season	League									Cup	European competitions		Top goalscorer	
Season	Division	P	W	D	L	F	A	Pts	Pos	Cup	European competitions		Player	Goals
1992–93	1. MFL	34	14	8	12	47	36	36	4th	RU				
1993–94	1. MFL	30	14	8	8	49	31	36	4th	RU				
1994–95	1. MFL	30	15	6	9	57	40	51	5th					
1995–96	1. MFL	28	13	4	11	51	40	43	5th	SF				
1996–97	1. MFL	26	9	6	11	36	35	33	9th	R2			Vancho Micevski	12
1997–98	1. MFL	25	10	7	8	31	24	37	6th				Fernando Jefferson	10
1998–99	1. MFL	26	7	8	11	30	50	29	10th	R2				
1999–00	1. MFL	26	14	5	7	48	30	47	4th	SF			Toni Micevski	11
2000–01	1. MFL	26	10	4	12	41	38	34	8th	W	Intertoto Cup	R3	Vancho Micevski	12
2001–02	1. MFL	20	8	3	9	37	35	27	10th	R2	UEFA Cup	QR	Vancho Micevski	19
2002–03	1. MFL	33	7	7	19	30	60	28	11th ↓	R2			Igor Momirovski	8
2003–04	2. MFL	32	16	4	12	48	42	52	6th	R2				
2004–05	2. MFL	33	12	7	14	40	43	43	6th	PR				
2005–06	2. MFL	33	19	4	7	52	22	61	1st ↑	PR				
2006–07	1. MFL	33	14	3	16	37	32	45	6th	SF			Blagojche Glavevski	7
2007–08	1. MFL	32	17	7	9	42	27	58	3rd	R2			Blagojche Glavevski	8
2008–09	1. MFL	30	7	7	16	25	42	28	10th	QF	UEFA Cup	QR1	Dragan Dimitrovski	9
2009–10	1. MFL	26	11	6	9	28	27	39	4th	SF			Dragan Dimitrovski	9
2010–11	1. MFL	33	5	3	25	25	82	18	12th ↓	R2			Igor Talevski	5
2011–12	2. MFL	30	19	4	7	42	23	61	1st ↑	R2				
2012–13	1. MFL	33	9	10	14	27	36	37	10th	QF			Blagojche Glavevski	6
2013–14	1. MFL	33	14	10	9	40	40	52	6th	QF			Dimitar Vodenicharov	10
2014–15	1. MFL	33	7	9	17	21	35	30	9th ↓	R2			Boško Stupić	6
2015–16	2. MFL	27	9	12	6	33	32	39	3rd ↑	R2			Blagojche Glavevski	6
2016–17	1. MFL	36	14	10	12	44	35	52	4th	W			Lucas Cardoso	11
2017–18	1. MFL	36	8	10	18	37	68	34	10th ↓	RU	Europa League	QR1	Ive Trifunovski	7
2018–19	2. MFL	27	11	8	8	27	20	41	3rd	R2			Blagojche Glavevski	10
2019–20^{1}	2. MFL West	16	10	3	3	32	14	33	1st ↑	N/A			Blagojche Glavevski	6
2020–21	1. MFL	33	12	9	12	38	48	45	6th	R2			Borche Manevski	7
2021–22	1. MFL	33	2	8	23	16	54	14	12th ↓	SF			Petar Ljamchevski	3
2022–23	2. MFL	30	17	7	6	64	26	58	4th	R2			Borche Manevski	15
2023–24	2. MFL	30	22	4	4	57	17	70	2nd ↑	R2			Simeon Hristov; Bojan Spirkoski	12
2024–25	1. MFL	33	10	9	14	26	38	39	6th	R2			Mirko Ivanovski	6
2025–26	1. MFL	33	10	10	13	40	42	40	8th ↓	R2			Luka Bulatović	10

^{1}The 2019–20 season was abandoned due to the COVID-19 pandemic in North Macedonia.

== Pelister in Europe ==
=== Results ===
Season	Competition	Round	Club	Home	Away	Aggregate
2000	UEFA Intertoto Cup	R1	(Luxembourg) Hobscheid	3–1	1–0	4–1
2000	UEFA Intertoto Cup	R2	(Sweden) Västra Frölunda	3–1	0–0	3–1
2000	UEFA Intertoto Cup	R3	(Spain) Celta de Vigo	1–2	0–3	1–5
2001–02	UEFA Cup	QR	(Switzerland) St. Gallen	0–2	3–2	3–4
2008–09	UEFA Cup	QR1	(Cyprus) APOEL	0–0	0–1	0–1
2017–18	UEFA Europa League	QR1	(Poland) Lech Poznań	0–3	0–4	0–7

=== UEFA club competition record ===
Competition	GP	W	D	L	GF	GA
UEFA Champions League	0	0	0	0	0	0
UEFA Europa League	2	0	0	2	0	7
UEFA Cup	4	1	1	2	3	5
UEFA Intertoto Cup	6	3	1	2	8	7
Total	12	4	2	6	11	19

=== Club rankings ===
UEFA club coefficient ranking

(As of 25 September 2021)

Rank	Team	Points
412	(Malta) Mosta FC	1.000
412	(Georgia (country)) FC Dila Gori	1.000
416	(Malta) Sirens FC	1.000
417	(North Macedonia) FK Makedonija	1.000
417	(North Macedonia) Akademija Pandev	1.000
419	(North Macedonia) FK Pelister	0.250

=== Club records in UEFA competitions ===
- Biggest Win in UEFA Competition: 17/06/2000, Pelister 3–1 Hobscheid, at Bitola
- Biggest Defeat in UEFA Competition: 30/06/2017, Lech Poznań 4–0 Pelister, at Poznań
- Club Appearances in UEFA Competition: 4
- Player with Most UEFA Appearances: (North Macedonia) Mile Dimov – 9 appearances
- Top Scorer in UEFA Club Competitions: (North Macedonia) Ilir Elmazovski – 3 goals

== Players ==
=== Current squad ===
As of 28 July 2026

Note: Flags indicate national team as defined under FIFA eligibility rules; some limited exceptions apply. Players may hold more than one non-FIFA nationality.

No.	Pos.	Nation	Player
1	GK	MKD	Nataniel Dimovski
2	DF	MKD	Hristijan Stojanovski
5	MF	MKD	Andrej Murgovski
6	DF	MKD	Hristijan Grozdanovski
7	FW	MKD	Ivan Ivanovski
8	MF	MKD	Danail Tasev
10	MF	MKD	Stefan Spirovski
11	FW	MKD	Martin Mirchevski
14	DF	MKD	Maksim Slavkov
16	MF	MKD	Petar Ristevski
17	DF	MKD	Alek Sivakov
19	FW	MKD	Kostadin Kapsarov
20	FW	MKD	Jakov Presilski
21	MF	MKD	Gabriel Krstevski

No.	Pos.	Nation	Player
22	DF	MKD	Enver Fejzulovski
23	MF	MKD	Petar Ljamchevski
24	MF	MKD	Jordancho Naumoski
25	DF	MKD	Marko Stojilevski
26	DF	MKD	Mite Cikarski
30	FW	MKD	Jovan Mrmachovski
34	FW	MKD	David Ivanovski
38	FW	MKD	Nikola Kapsarov
47	MF	MKD	Martin Talevski
70	FW	MKD	Simeon Hristov
82	GK	MKD	David Iloski
88	MF	MKD	Blagojche Spirkoski
99	FW	MKD	Kire Stojanov

==== In ====
Date	Position	Player	Moving from
9 July 2026	LW	(North Macedonia) Martin Mirchevski	(North Macedonia) FK Sileks
9 July 2026	AM	(North Macedonia) Petar Ljamchevski	(North Macedonia) FK Novaci
9 July 2026	ST	(North Macedonia) Simeon Hristov	(North Macedonia) FK Skopje
9 July 2026	DM	(North Macedonia) Jordancho Naumoski	(North Macedonia) FK Bregalnica
9 July 2026	CM	(North Macedonia) Daniel Tasev	(North Macedonia) GFK Tikvesh
9 July 2026	GK	(North Macedonia) David Iloski	(North Macedonia) Brera Strumica
9 July 2026	LB	(North Macedonia) Maksim Slavkov	(Czech Republic) SK Sparta Kolín
23 July 2026	RW	(North Macedonia) Kostain Kapsarov	(North Macedonia) FK Bregalnica
28 July 2026	DM	(North Macedonia) Blagojche Spirskoski	(North Macedonia) FK Ohrid
5 August 2026	CF	(North Macedonia) David Ivanovski	(North Macedonia) FK Kozhuf
11 August 2026	LW	(North Macedonia) Kire Stojanov	(North Macedonia) Brera Strumica
25 August 2026	RW	(North Macedonia) Ivan Ivanovski	(Jordan) Al-Ramtha SC
25 August 2026	RB	(North Macedonia) Marko Stojilevski	(Serbia) FK Smederevo
8 September 2026	LB	(North Macedonia) Mite Cikarski	(North Macedonia) FK Belasica

==== Out ====
Date	Position	Player	Moving to
26 June 2026	LW	(North Macedonia) Vildan Kerim	(North Macedonia) Shkëndija Haraçinë
5 July 2026	GK	(North Macedonia) Andrej Jovcevski	(North Macedonia) FC Struga Trim & Lum
6 July 2026	ST	(North Macedonia) Mirko Ivanovski	Retires
6 July 2026	CM	(North Macedonia) David Angelevski	(Serbia) Spartak Subotica
2 August 2026	RB	(North Macedonia) Filip Boshkovski	(Albania) Flamurtari
3 August 2026	RW	(Serbia) Luka Bulatovic	(Indonesia) PSM Makassar
4 August 2026	LWB	(Serbia) Milan Srbijanac	(Serbia) FK Bor 1919
11 August 2026	RB	(North Macedonia) Stefan Ivanovski	(North Macedonia) FK Novaci
1 September 2026	CM	(North Macedonia) Tomche Grozdanovski	(North Macedonia) FK Skopje
TBA	CB	(North Macedonia) Aleksandar Ristevski	TBA
TBA	CF	(North Macedonia) Petar Petkovski	TBA
TBA	LW	(North Macedonia) Marjan Ristovski	TBA
TBA	CF	(Serbia) Filip Petrovic	TBA
TBA	CB	(Serbia) Nemanja Zdravkovic	TBA

=== Youth players ===
Players from the U19 Youth Team that have been summoned with the first team in the current season.

Note: Flags indicate national team as defined under FIFA eligibility rules; some limited exceptions apply. Players may hold more than one non-FIFA nationality.

No.	Pos.	Nation	Player

=== Out on loan ===
Note: Flags indicate national team as defined under FIFA eligibility rules; some limited exceptions apply. Players may hold more than one non-FIFA nationality.

No.	Pos.	Nation	Player

=== Club officials ===
As of 18 August 2025

Position	Staff
President - General executive director	(North Macedonia) Dimitar Mitrevski
Sports director	(North Macedonia) Vančo Micevski
Technical director	(North Macedonia) Sašo Zdravevski
General secretary	(North Macedonia) Bruno Presilski
Executive director	(North Macedonia) Stefani N. Dimovska
Chairman of the board of directors	(North Macedonia) Stefanija Bocevska
Head coach	(North Macedonia) Borche Hristov
Assistant coach	(North Macedonia) Goran Ganchev
Assistant coach	(North Macedonia) Trajche Stojkovski
Conditioning trainer	(North Macedonia) Sashe Veljanvoski
Goalkeeping coach	(North Macedonia) Ilche Petrovski
Economist	(North Macedonia) Goce Stavrevski
Physiotherapist	(North Macedonia) Hristijan Trpevski
Physiotherapist	(North Macedonia) Nikolche Mitrevski
Head doctor of FC Pelister	(North Macedonia) D-r. Hristo Bojadzhiev

=== Historical list of coaches ===
- (Socialist Federal Republic of Yugoslavia) Stavre Eftimovski
- (Socialist Federal Republic of Yugoslavia) Ivan Čabrinović
- (Socialist Federal Republic of Yugoslavia) Gjoko Hadjievski (1988 – 1990)
- (Socialist Federal Republic of Yugoslavia) Tome Dimitrovski (1990 – 1992)
- (North Macedonia) Kire Gruevski (1992 – 1993)
- (North Macedonia) Zoran Smileski
- (North Macedonia) Ilija Dimoski
- (North Macedonia) Dushan Kechan (1995 – 1996)
- (North Macedonia) Nexhat Husein (1999)
- (North Macedonia) Kiril Dojchinovski (2000)
- (Federal Republic of Yugoslavia) Branko Božić (2000)
- (North Macedonia) Spase Ristevski (2001)
- (North Macedonia) Blagoja Kitanovski (2001 – 2002)
- (North Macedonia) Perica Gruevski (2003)
- (North Macedonia) Marjan Sekulovski (2004 – 2007)
- (North Macedonia) Nexhat Husein (2007 – Nov 2008)
- (North Macedonia) Zlatko Cvetanovski (interim) (16 Nov 2008 - Feb 2009)
- (North Macedonia) Alekso Mackov (1 Mar 2009 - Sep 2009)
- (North Macedonia) Gjoko Ilievski (29 Sep 2009 - Oct 2009)
- (North Macedonia) Naum Ljamchevski (6 Oct 2009 - Sep 2010)
- (North Macedonia) Nexhat Husein (24 Sep 2010 – Jun 2011)
- (North Macedonia) Marjan Sekulovski (2011 – 2012)
- (North Macedonia) Mile Dimov (interim) (2012)
- (North Macedonia) Gorazd Mihajlov (Jul 2012 - Dec 2012)
- (North Macedonia) Gordan Zdravkov (11 Jan 2013 - May 2013)
- (North Macedonia) Mile Dimov (interim) (6 May 2013 – Jun 2013)
- (North Macedonia) Dragan Bocheski (Jul 2013 – Jun 2014)
- (North Macedonia) Marjan Sekulovski (Jul 2014 - Nov 2014)
- (North Macedonia) Dimitar Kapinkovski (interim) (24 Nov 2014 - Dec 2014)
- (North Macedonia) Gjoko Hadžievski (4 Dec 2014 – 2015)
- (North Macedonia) Naum Ljamchevski (Jul 2015 - Oct 2016)
- (Kosovo) (Turkey) Naci Şensoy (Oct 2016 – Jul 2017)
- (North Macedonia) Srgjan Zaharievski (19 Jul 2017 – 26 Oct 2017)
- (North Macedonia) Spase Ristevski (interim) (Nov 2017 – 31 Dec 2017)
- (North Macedonia) Marjan Sekulovski (Jan 2018 – Apr 2018)
- (North Macedonia) Nexhat Husein (2018)
- (North Macedonia) Tome Trajanovski (2018)
- (North Macedonia) Darko Krsteski (2018 – 2019)
- (North Macedonia) Zoran Shterjovski (2019-2020)
- (North Macedonia) Dimitar Kapinkovski (2021)
- (North Macedonia) Marjan Sekulovski (2022)
- (North Macedonia) Boban Babunski (2023)
- (North Macedonia) Vlatko Kostov (2023 – 2024)
- (North Macedonia) Srgjan Zaharievski (2025 –2026)
- (North Macedonia) Marjan Sekulovski (2026)
