= 2012 MFF Cup =

Tournament details
- Country: Myanmar

Final positions
- Champions: Ayeyawady United (1st title)
- Runners-up: Kanbawza

The MFF Digicel Cup 2012 was the 2012 edition of the MFF Cup. The winner qualified for the 2013 AFC Cup.

== First round ==
Draw:

Results (in Burmese):

Team 1	Score	Team 2
Rakhine United	1–0	Zwegabin United
Zeyashwemye	2–0	Mawyawadi
Yangon United	5–1	Magway
Kanbawza	9–2	Chin United
Ayeyawady United	1–1 (aet) (3–2 p)	MOD
Yadanarbon	2–1	Manawmye
Hanthawardy United	3–1	Southern Myanmar United
Naypyidaw	w/o	ACE

== Quarter-finals ==
Results:

Team 1	Score	Team 2
Yangon United	1–0	Zeyashwemye
Naypyidaw	0–1	Hanthawardy United
Kanbawza	6–1	Rakhine United
Yadanarbon	1–1 (aet) (1–4 p)	Ayeyawady United

== Semi-finals ==
Team 1	Score	Team 2
Hanthawardy United	1–1 (aet) (3–4 p)	Ayeyawady United
Yangon United	1–2	Kanbawza

== Final ==
31 October 2012

Ayeyawady United	1 – 0	Kanbawza
	Report

Thuwunna Stadium, Yangon
