= Kyaw Min Oo =

Burmese professional footballer (born 1996)

Personal information
- Full name: Kyaw Min Oo
- Date of birth: 16 May 1996 (age 30)
- Place of birth: Oktwin, Myanmar
- Height: 1.78 m (5 ft 10 in)
- Positions: Defensive midfielder; centre-back

Team information
- Current team: Terengganu
- Number: 23

Youth career
- 2010: Yangon Sport College
- 2011–2013: Mandalay Football Academy

Senior career*
Years	Team	Apps	(Gls)
2014–2015	Ayeyawady United	10	(2)
2016–2019	Yangon United	28	(0)
2022–2023	Yangon United	17	(0)
2023–2026	PDRM	62	(2)
2026–	Terengganu	14	(0)

International career^{‡}
2011	Myanmar U16	4	(0)
2013–2015	Myanmar U19	12	(0)
2013–2019	Myanmar U23	6	(0)
2014–	Myanmar	46	(2)
- * Club domestic league appearances and goals as of 28 July 2026 ‡ National team caps and goals as of 4 August 2026

Kyaw Min Oo (Burmese: ကျော်မင်းဦး; born 16 June 1996) is a Burmese professional footballer who plays as a defensive midfielder or centre-back for Malaysia Super League club Terengganu and the Myanmar national team.

Kyaw has represented Myanmar at U17, U20, U23, and senior level. In 2015, he represented Myanmar at the FIFA U-20 World Cup.

== Club career ==
Kyaw was born in Oktwin Township, Bago District. He studied in Myanmar Football Academy (Mandalay) for about three years.

On 25 January 2014, Ayeyawady United signed Kyaw where played two years for Ayeyawady United and then he moved to Yangon United at the end of his contract in January 2016.

Kyaw retired in early 2019, citing several injuries from he suffered since 2016. In May 2022, he healed his injuries with help from the president of the Myanmar Football Federation, Zaw Zaw and returned to the playing football professionally after a three years break. Kyaw returned and featured for Yangon United in May 2022.

On 8 February 2023, Kyaw was recruited by Malaysia Super League club PDRM as their ASEAN import. He make his club debut on 25 February in a 4–0 lost to Sabah. Kyaw recorded a brace of assists in a 3–0 win against Penang on 27 August. He then scored his first goal since his returned from injury in a 7–2 win over Kelantan on 10 December.

During the start of the 2025–26 season, Kyaw was name as the club captain of PDRM.

On 29 September 2025, Kyaw signed for Terengganu.

== International career ==
=== Youth ===
Kyaw first appeared on the Myanmar under-16 team that took part in the 2011 AFF U-16 Youth Championship before gradually making it to the higher levels of national teams. He is a playmaker with good passing, tackling, and good vision.

Kyaw played an important role in Myanmar under-20 squad for 2015 FIFA U-20 World Cup in New Zealand.

== Internationals goals and apps ==
– Internationals goals and apps
Team	Internationals	Goals	apps
Yangon United	AFC Champions League 2	0	2

– Internationals goals and apps
National Team	Internationals	Goals	apps
Myanmar U20	FIFA U20 World Cup	0	3

== Club statistics ==
As of 19 July 2026

Appearances and goals by club team and year
Club team	Year	Apps	Goals	Assists
PDRM	2023	27	1	3
PDRM	2024	30	0	4
PDRM	2025–2026	5	1	1
Terengganu	2025–2026	14	0	1
Total		76	2	9

== Career statistics ==
=== International ===
As of 28 July 2026

Appearances and goals by national team and year
National team	Year	Apps	Goals
Myanmar	2014	5	0
Myanmar	2015	6	0
Myanmar	2016	0	0
Myanmar	2017	0	0
Myanmar	2018	0	0
Myanmar	2019	0	0
Myanmar	2020	0	0
Myanmar	2021	0	0
Myanmar	2022	9	1
Myanmar	2023	8	0
Myanmar	2024	5	0
Myanmar	2025	6	0
Myanmar	2026	7	1
Total		46	2

As of match played 28 July 2026:
Myanmar score listed first, score column indicates score after each Kyaw Min Oo goal

List of international goals scored by Kyaw Min Oo
No.	Date	Venue	Cap	Opponent	Score	Result	Competition
1	30 December 2022	Thuwunna Stadium, Yangon, Myanmar	20	Laos	1–1	2–2	2022 AFF Championship
2	28 July 2026	New Clark City Athletics Stadium, Capas, Philippines	45	Philippines	1–0	4–1	2026 ASEAN Championship

== Honours ==
Myanmar

- Tri-Nation Series (India) runner-up: 2023
- Hassanal Bolkiah Trophy: 2014
- 2015 General Aung San Shield: 2015

PDRM

- MFL Challenge Cup: 2023
