= 2015 General Aung San Shield =

2015 Bogyoke Aung San Shield
MFF Cup

Tournament details
- Country: Myanmar
- City: Yangon
- Venue: Bogyoke Aung San Stadium
- Dates: 25 April 2015 – 27 September 2015
- Teams: 20

Final positions
- Champions: Ayeyawady United(3rd title)
- Runners-up: Yadanarbon

Tournament statistics
- Matches played: 18
- Goals scored: 94 (5.22 per match)
- Top goal scorer: Riste Naumov (8 goals)

The 2015 General Aung San Shield (Burmese: Bogyoke Aung San Shield) is the first season of Myanmar knockout football competition. The tournament is organized by the Myanmar Football Federation. It is the league cup competition started in 2015 Myanmar football season. This cup succeeded the Myanmar Football Federation Cup. MFF has changed the cup competition style as follows.

In the first round, ten clubs competing in 2015 MNL-2 and two clubs which were promoted to 2015 MNL, twelve teams in total, will be involved playing at a neutral ground with six teams emerged as winners. In the second round, ten clubs competing in 2015 MNL and the six winners from the first round, sixteen teams in total, will be involved playing at a neutral ground with eight teams emerged as winners. The Quarter-finals will still be played as one-legged matches but the Semi-final will be competed as two-legged (Home and Away) matches.

The cup winner is guaranteed a place in the 2016 AFC Cup.

== Prize fund ==
Round	No. of Clubs receive fund	Prize fund per club
Final runners-up	1	150,000,000MMK
Final winner	1	300,000,000MMK
Total		450,000,000MMK

== Results ==
=== Preliminary round ===
Preliminary round consists of two rounds for teams currently playing in the Regional League Division 1 level. The First round was held 25 April 2015.

==== First round ====
25 April 2015	Mawyawadi FC	0 – 2	Horizon FC

25 April 2015	Hantharwady United	11 – 1	Pong Gan FC
	Ousmanou 13'; Aung Min Thein 16'; Aung Myo Thura 23', 36', 54', 57', 64'; Myint Naing 27', 43'; Zaw Zin Oo 59', 86'		Zagun Sin Aung 63'

26 April 2015	Myawady FC	1 – 1 (1 - 2 p)	GFA FC

26 April 2015	Silver Stars FC	2 – 4	All-University Selection FC

27 April 2015	Southern Myanmar United	2 – 0	Best United FC

27 April 2015	Dagon FC	1 – 4	Rakhine United

==== Second round ====
11 July 2015	Yadanarbon	9 – 0	Horizon FC	Bogyoke Aung San Stadium
4:00 PM	Moukailou 2'; Shine Thura 20'; Keith 41', 43', 51'; Maximin 73', 89'; Yeon Gisung 78', 80'

11 July 2015	Hantharwady United	3 – 1	Kanbawza	Thuwunna Stadium, Yangon
4:00 PM	Aung Aung Oo 64'; Bamba 68'; Aung Myo Thura 82'		Soe Min Oo 53'

12 July 2015	Magway	1 – 0	Chin United	Thuwunna Stadium, Yangon
4:00 PM	Sylla 79'

12 July 2015	GFA FC	1 – 0	Yangon United	Bogyoke Aung San Stadium
	Micheal 59'

13 July 2015	Zwegapin United	4 – 3 (a.e.t.)	Zeyar Shwe Myay	Bogyoke Aung San Stadium
	Sai Min Tun 61'; Zivkovic 65', 90+2'; Ken 90+1'		Yan Naing Oo 19'; Victor 44', 81'

13 July 2015	All-University Selection FC	0 – 7	Ayeyawady United	Thuwunna Stadium, Yangon
			Riste 7', 34', 43', 53'; Pyae Phyo Oo 22'; Lazar 82'; Thiha Zaw 90+3'

14 July 2015	Rakhine United	2 – 0	Nay Pyi Taw	Bogyoke Aung San Stadium
	Thi Ha Aung 39'; Wai Phyo Lwin 81'

14 July 2015	Manaw Myay	2 – 1 (a.e.t.)	Southern Myanmar	Thuwunna Stadium, Yangon
	Zaw Khar 13' (o.g.); Sa Htet Naing Win 115'		Khine Zaw Tun 68'

=== Quarterfinal ===
1 August 2015	Yadanarbon	2 - 1 (a.e.t.)	Hantharwady United	Bogyoke Aung San Stadium
4:00 PM	Shine Thu Ya 45+1'; Keith 115'		Bamba 10'	Referee: U Ko Ko Naing

1 August 2015	Magway	2 - 0	GFA FC	Thuwunna Stadium
4:00 PM	Micheal 58'; Sett Phyo Wai 90+3'			Referee: U Than Tin

2 August 2015	Zwegapin United	2 - 2 (a.e.t.) (3–4 p)	Ayeyawady United	Bogyoke Aung San Stadium
4:00 PM	Zivkovic 2'; Kaung Sithu 90+4'		Riste 18', 30' (pen.)	Referee: U Zaw Khine
	Penalties
	Zivkovic (penalty scored); Thein Zaw (penalty missed); Junior (penalty scored); Ken (penalty scored); Shwe Win Tun (penalty missed)		(penalty scored) Lazar; (penalty scored) Sim Woo Sub; (penalty scored) Moe Win; (penalty scored) San Myo Oo

2 August 2015	Rakhine United	7 - 2	Manaw Myay	Thuwunna Stadium
4:00 PM	Pyi Moe 12', 31', 48', 85'; Naing Naing Kyaw 72'; Min Ko Thu 90+1', 90+3'		Amaobi 10'; Ibrahim 23'

=== First leg ===
12 August 2015	Yadanarbon	6 - 0	Magway	Bahtoo Stadium, Mandalay
16:00 MST	Aung Thu 36', 66'; Keith Martu Nah 42', 51' (pen.), 63'; Yeon Gisung 59'			Referee: Suhaizi Bin Shukri

13 August 2015	Ayeyawady United	2 - 0	Rakhine United	Thuwunna Stadium, Yangon
16:00 MST	Lazar 9'; Riste 59' (pen.)			Referee: Suhaizi Bin Shukri

=== Second leg ===
19 August 2015	Magway	0 - 2	Yadanarbon	Thuwunna Stadium, Yangon
16:00 MST			Yeon Gisung 55'; Sithu Aung 77'	Referee: (Thailand) Mr.Ketdumrong Ktem Thomg

20 August 2015	Rakhine United	0 - 1	Ayeyawady United	Bogyoke Aung San Stadium, Yangon
16:00 MST			Thiha Zaw 23'	Referee: (Thailand) Mr.Sangnakorn

=== Final ===
27 September 2015	Ayeyawady United	2 - 1	Yadanarbon	Bogyoke Aung San Stadium, Yangon
16:00 MST	Riste Naumov 64'; Kyaw Min Oo 71'		Moukailou 22'	Referee: (Thailand) Mr.Taweechai Supatwan

== Top goalscorers ==
Rank	Player	Club	Goals
1	(North Macedonia) Riste	Ayeyawady United	8
2	(Liberia) Keith Martu Nah	Yadanarbon	7
3	(Myanmar) Aung Myo Thu Ra	Hantharwady United	6
4	(Myanmar) Pyi Moe	Rakhine United	4
4	(South Korea) Yeon Gi Sung	Yadanarbon	4
6	(Croatia) Zivkovic	Zwegapin United	3
7	(Ivory Coast) Maximum	Yadanarbon	2
7	(Myanmar) Aung Thu	Yadanarbon	2
