= Lazar Vidić =

Serbian footballer

Personal information
- Full name: Lazar Vidić
- Date of birth: 10 July 1989 (age 37)
- Place of birth: Skopje, SFR Yugoslavia
- Height: 1.83 m (6 ft 0 in)
- Position: Forward

Youth career
- Bregalnica Štip

Senior career*
Years	Team	Apps	(Gls)
2011–2012	Radnicki Kragujevac	21	(3)
2011	→ Mladi Radnik (Loan)	9	(0)
2012–2013	Slavija Sarajevo	26	(4)
2013	Velež Mostar	12	(0)
2013–2014	Rudar Prijedor	25	(7)
2014	Mladost Obarska	16	(1)
2015	Metalleghe-BSI	12	(4)
2015	Ayeyawady United		
2016	Lynx	5	(4)
2016	Radnicki Kragujevax		
2016	Eastern District	11	(2)
2017	Biu Chun Glory Sky	5	(1)
2017	Dinamo Vranje	4	(0)
2018	Šumadija 1903		
- * Club domestic league appearances and goals as of 23 January 2018

Lazar Vidić (Serbian: Vidic Lazar; born 10 July 1989) is a Serbian retired football striker and a professional poker player.

In younger days his football role model was Paul Gascoigne, Diego Maradona and Claudio Caniggia.
