= Van Lar Hruaia =

Burmese footballer

Vanlalhruaia
Personal information
- Full name: Vanlalhruaia
- Date of birth: 25 May 1991 (age 35)
- Place of birth: Myanmar
- Height: 1.73 m (5 ft 8 in)
- Position: Goalkeeper

Team information
- Current team: Rakhine United
- Number: 31

Senior career*
Years	Team	Apps	(Gls)
2013–2014	Nay Pyi Taw		
2014–2018	Ayeyawady United		
2019	Dagon		
2020–	Rakhine United		

International career^{‡}
2015	Myanmar	3	(0)
- * Club domestic league appearances and goals as of 23 April 2020 ‡ National team caps and goals as of 16 June 2015

Vanlalhruaia (born 25 May 1991) is a Burmese footballer who plays as a goalkeeper for Rakhine United. He made his international debut on 30 March 2015 against Indonesia.
