= Marjan Sekulovski =

Macedonian footballer and manager

Personal information
- Full name: Marjan Sekulovski; Марјан Секуловски
- Date of birth: 13 March 1973 (age 53)
- Place of birth: Bitola, SFR Yugoslavia
- Height: 1.70 m (5 ft 7 in)
- Position: Midfielder

Youth career
- Pelister

Senior career*
Years	Team	Apps	(Gls)
- Pelister
- Borec
- Prespa
- Napredok
- Novaci
- Bitola

International career
- Macedonia U15
- Macedonia U17
- Macedonia U19

Managerial career
- 2001–2004: Pelister (youth team)
- 2004–2007: Pelister
- 2007–2008: Sileks
- 2009–2010: 11 Oktomvri
- 2010–2011: Novaci
- 2011–2012: 11 Oktomvri
- 2011–2012: Pelister
- 2012: Ayeyawady United
- 2013: Ayeyawady United
- 2014: Makedonija Gjorče Petrov
- 2014: Pelister
- 2014: Ayeyawady United
- 2015: Ayeyawady United
- 2016: Yangon United
- 2017: Maziya S&RC
- 2017–2018: Pelister
- 2018: Shan United
- 2019–2020: Maziya S&RC
- 2020–2022: Bregalnica Štip
- 2022–2023: Pelister
- 2023–2024: Sheikh Jamal Dhanmondi
- 2026: Pelister
- * Club domestic league appearances and goals

Marjan Sekulovski (Macedonian: Марјан Секуловски; born 13 March 1973) is a Macedonian football manager and former player. As of 2026, he was the recent coach of FK Pelister in the Macedonian First League.

== Playing career ==
Sekulovski played for Macedonian club teams FK Pelister, FK Prespa, FK Novaci, FK Bitola, FK Borec and FK Napredok. He also played for the Macedonian National Teams (U-15, U-17, and U-19). He played in the attacking (creative) midfielder position.

At the age of 28, he suffered a severe injury of his Achilles tendon, and finished his career as a player. In May 2001, he started his coaching career.

== Managerial career ==
In June 2001, Sekulovski started his coaching career as Head Coach of the FK Pelister Youth Team, FK Pelister. In all of his first three seasons as coach, the FK Pelister Youth Team were runners-up in the Macedonian First Youth League. In May 2004, FK Pelister, won the Macedonian National Cup.

In June 2004, Sekulovski became the club's youngest-ever Head Coach when he took over coaching the Professional Senior Team of the FK Pelister. During the 2005-2006 season, he led the team to their first Macedonian Second League title, with an unbeaten record of 18 official matches in a row. In the following season, FK Pelister finished in 5th position and played 1/2 final match in the National Cup. Over the next few years, Sekulovski transferred between various football clubs:

- 2007-2008 season: coached FK Sileks in the Macedonian First League
- 2009-2010 season: coached FK Oktomvri in the Macedonian Second League
- 2010-2011 season: coached FK Novaci in the Macedonian Second League
- 2011-2012 season: coached FK Pelister in the Macedonian Second League, leading them to a title and an undefeated streak of 14 official matches in a row

In May 2012, Sekulovski left FK Pelister and went to Myanmar to manage his first international club, Ayeyawady United. That season, for the first time in history, Ayeyawady United FC won the Myanmar National Cup and qualified to play in the AFC CUP Group Stage. In January 2013, Ayeyawady United FC was the runner-up in the Myanmar Super Cup 2013.

In 2014, Sekulovski returned to Macedonia to coach FK Makedonija and later FK Pelister in the Macedonian First League. In December 2014, the Macedonian Football Federation awarded Marjan Sekulovski the Best Macedonian Football Coach Who Works Abroad.

In 2015, Sekulovski returned to Ayeyawady United FC, which won the Myanmar Super Cup (MFF Charity Cup), then successfully finished and passed the Group Stage in the AFC CUP, without losing a match, qualifying to play the 1/8 final match in AFC CUP for the first time in the club's history. Meanwhile, Ayeyawady United FC successfully played in the Myanmar National League 2015 and the AFC CUP 2015, with an unbeaten record of 15 official matches in a row. In September 2015, for the second time under Sekulovski's management, Ayeyawady United FC won the Myanmar National Cup and qualified to play in the AFC CUP Group Stage in 2016.

In January 2016, Marjan Sekulovski signed a contract with Yangon United FC, in Myanmar. They went on to play a second preliminary round qualification match in the Asian Champions League, for the first time in history. By the time Sekulovski left the team, Yangon United FC was in second position in the Myanmar National League and already qualified in the Semifinal of the Myanmar National Cup.

Sekulovski signed a 10-month contract for the full 2017 season with Maziya Sports and Recreation Club FC, one of the most famous clubs in Maldives and the current Champion of Maldives. Under his leadership, Maziya S&RC FC won the Super Cup of Maldives (Charity Shield), became the first Maldivian football team to defeat an Indian football team in India, played in the AFC Cup Group stage and scored the best record in their team's history, won the Sto Male League, and won the Maldivian National League. Sekulovski stayed in Maziya S&RC FC until the end of his 10-month contract on 31 October 2017.

In January 2018, Sekulovski returned to Macedonia as the head coach of FK Pelister for the fourth time. When he left the club in April 2018, FK Pelister was qualified for the final game of the National Cup of Macedonia. He transferred to Shan United from Myanmar on a 5-month contract until the end of the 2018 season. United was the League and Cup Champion of Myanmar in 2017, and with Sekulovski as head coach, Shan United placed second in the Myanmar National League and qualified to play in AFC Cup Group Stage.

For the 2019-2020 season, Sekulovski signed a contract with Maziya S&RC FC for the second time. Under Sekulovski, they broke two historical records for the biggest win in Maldivian National League history (Maziya 13 : 0 Nilandhoo, 25 June 2019) and the fastest goal in Maldivian National League history (when Asadhulla Abdhulla scored in 15 seconds, 3 August 2019). Maziya S&RC FC won the Maldives National League Championship and had success in the AFC Cup Qualification Round and Group Stage.

From November 2020 to June 2022, Sekulovski signed a long-term contract as head coach with FK Bregalnica Štip in Мacedonia. FK Bregalnica Štip became the champions of the Macedonian Second League in the 2020-2021 season. On January 10, 2022, Sekulovski canceled his contract before its expiration and left Bregalnica Štip because of private reasons. When he left the team, FK Bregalnica Štip was in 4th position in the Macedonian First League. Ten days later, he signed an 18-month contract with FK Pelister in the Macedonian First League. He coached the team for one year, then in January 2023, he cancelled his contract early. On September 1, 2023, Sekulovski signed a contract for the upcoming 2023-2024 season with Sheikh Jamal DC, a team in the Bangladesh Premier League.

== Achievements ==
Head Coach Awards and Achievements:

- CHAMPION - NATIONAL LEAGUE (5): 2005/2006, 2011/2012, 2017, 2019/2020, 2020/2021
- CHAMPION - NATIONAL CUP (3): 2003/2004, 2012, 2015
- CHAMPION - NATIONAL SUPER CUP (2): 2015, 2017
- RUNNERS UP - NATIONAL LEAGUE (4): 2001/2002, 2002/2003, 2003/2004, 2018
- RUNNERS UP - NATIONAL CUP (1): 2017/2018
- RUNNERS UP - NATIONAL SUPER CUP (1): 2013
- AFC CUP - GROUP STAGE (5): 2013, 2015, 2016, 2017, 2020
- AFC CUP - ROUND OF 16 (1): 2015
- ACL - SECOND PRELIMINARY ROUND (1): 2016
- AFC CUP - CHAMPION / WINNER AT QUALIFICATIONS ROUND/STAGE FOR AFC CUP 2020 IN SOUTH ASIA ZONE (1): 2020
- AFC CUP - CHAMPION / WINNER AT PLAYOFF ROUND/STAGE FOR AFC CUP 2020 IN SOUTH ASIA ZONE (1): 2020
- 2001 / 2002 - FC "PELISTER" - BITOLA (YOUTH TEAM U - 15) - RUNNER UP - MACEDONIA NATIONAL YOUTH LEAGUE (U – 15)
- 2002 / 2003 - FC "PELISTER" - BITOLA (YOUTH TEAM U - 16) - RUNNER UP - MACEDONIA NATIONAL YOUTH LEAGUE (U – 16)
- 2003 / 2004 - FC "PELISTER" - BITOLA (YOUTH TEAM U - 17) - RUNNER UP - MACEDONIA NATIONAL YOUTH LEAGUE (U – 17)
- 2003 / 2004 - FC "PELISTER" - BITOLA (YOUTH TEAM U - 17) - CHAMPION / WINNER - MACEDONIA NATIONAL CUP
- 2005 / 2006 - FC "PELISTER" - BITOLA (MACEDONIA) - CHAMPION / WINNER - I PLACE - PROMOTION IN I MFL
- 2006 / 2007 - FC "PELISTER" - BITOLA (MACEDONIA) - 1 / 2 FINAL MATCH - MACEDONIA NATIONAL CUP
- 2009 / 2010 - UEFA PRO DIPLOMA / LICENCE - FOOTBALL HEAD COACH - GRADUATION
- 2011 / 2012 - FC "PELISTER" - BITOLA (MACEDONIA) - CHAMPION / WINNER - I PLACE - PROMOTION IN I MFL
- 2012 - "AYEYAWADY UNITED FC" (MYANMAR) - CHAMPION / WINNER - MYANMAR NATIONAL CUP 2012 (MFF DIGICEL CUP 2012)
- 2013 - "AYEYAWADY UNITED FC" (MYANMAR) - RUNNER UP - MYANMAR SUPER CUP 2013 (MFF CHARITY CUP 2013)
- 2013 - "AYEYAWADY UNITED FC" (MYANMAR) - AFC CUP 2013 - GROUP STAGE
- 2014 - THE BEST MACEDONIAN COACH ABROAD - AWARDED FROM FOOTBALL FEDERATION OF MACEDONIA
- 2015 - "AYEYAWADY UNITED FC" (MYANMAR) - CHAMPION / WINNER - MYANMAR SUPER CUP 2015 (MFF CHARITY CUP 2015)
- 2015 - "AYEYAWADY UNITED FC" (MYANMAR) - AFC CUP 2015 - PASS THE GROUP STAGE AND QUALIFIED TO PLAY 1/8 FINAL IN AFC CUP 2015
- 2015 - "AYEYAWADY UNITED FC" (MYANMAR) - CHAMPION / WINNER - MYANMAR NATIONAL CUP 2015 (GENERAL AUNG SAN SHIELD 2015)
- 2016 - "YANGON UNITED FC" (MYANMAR) - ASIAN CHAMPIONS LEAGUE 2016 - SECOND PRELIMINARY STAGE
- 2016 - "YANGON UNITED FC" (MYANMAR) - AFC CUP 2016 - GROUP STAGE
- 2017 - "MAZIYA S & RC FC" (MALDIVES) - CHAMPION / WINNER - SUPER CUP OF MALDIVES 2017 - CHARITY SHIELD 2017
- 2017 - "MAZIYA S & RC FC" (MALDIVES) - AFC CUP 2017 - GROUP STAGE
- 2017 - "MAZIYA S & RC FC" (MALDIVES) - CHAMPION / WINNER - STO MALE LEAGUE 2017 - MALDIVIAN NATIONAL FOOTBALL LEAGUE 2017
- 2017 / 2018 - "FC PELISTER" - BITOLA (MACEDONIA) - FINALIST / RUNNER UP - MACEDONIA NATIONAL CUP
- 2018 - "SHAN UNITED FC" (MYANMAR) - RUNNER UP - MYANMAR NATIONAL LEAGUE 2018
- 2019 / 2020 - "MAZIYA S & RC FC" (MALDIVES) - CHAMPION / WINNER - DDPL 2019 / 2020 - MALDIVIAN NATIONAL FOOTBALL LEAGUE 2019 / 2020
- 2020 - "MAZIYA S & RC FC" (MALDIVES) - CHAMPION / WINNER AT QUALIFICATIONS ROUND/STAGE FOR AFC CUP 2020 IN SOUTH ASIA ZONE
- 2020 - "MAZIYA S & RC FC" (MALDIVES) - CHAMPION / WINNER AT PLAYOFF ROUND/STAGE FOR AFC CUP 2020 IN SOUTH ASIA ZONE
- 2020 - "MAZIYA S & RC FC" (MALDIVES) - AFC CUP 2020 - GROUP STAGE
- 2020 / 2021 - FC "BREGALNICA" - STIP (MACEDONIA) - CHAMPION / WINNER - I PLACE - PROMOTION IN I MFL
