= 2014 MFF Cup =

Tournament details
- Country: Myanmar
- Teams: 22

Final positions
- Champions: Ayeyawady United (2nd title)
- Runners-up: Nay Pyi Taw

The MFF Ooredoo Cup 2014 was the 2014 edition of the MFF Cup. The winner qualified for the 2015 AFC Cup.

A total of 22 teams entered the competition.

== First round ==
Draw held on 31 March 2014.

Matches played on 5 and 6 April 2014.

| Team 1 | Score | Team 2 |
|---|---|---|
| Silver Stars | 2–4 | Horizon |
| Dagon | 3–0 | University |
| Best United | 2–4 | Mawyawaddy |

== Second round ==
Draw held on 2 May 2014.

Matches played on 7, 8 and 9 May 2014.

| Team 1 | Score | Team 2 |
|---|---|---|
| Hanthawardy United | 2–0 | Mawyawaddy |
| Myawady | 2–0 | GFA |
| Rakhine United | 0–1 | Southern Myanmar United |
| Dagon | 0–2 | Chin United |
| Horizon | – | U-19 |

== Third round ==
Draw held on 30 June 2014.

Matches played on 5, 6 and 7 July 2014.

| Team 1 | Score | Team 2 |
|---|---|---|
| Southern Myanmar United | 1–3 | Yadanarbon |
| Myawady | 0–2 | Magway |
| Kanbawza | 0–2 | Zwegabin United |
| Chin United | 2–1 | Manawmye |
| Ayeyawady United | 1–0 | Zeyashwemye |
| Hanthawardy United | 1–0 | Horizon |

== Quarter-finals ==
Matches played on 20 and 21 July 2014.

| Team 1 | Score | Team 2 |
|---|---|---|
| Yangon United | 1–2 | Yadanarbon |
| Chin United | 1–0 | Hanthawardy United |
| Nay Pyi Taw | 0–0 (a.e.t.) (7–6 p) | Magway |
| Zwegabin United | 1–2 (a.e.t.) | Ayeyawady United |

== Semi-finals ==
Matches played on 6 August 2014.

| Team 1 | Score | Team 2 |
|---|---|---|
| Ayeyawady United | 1–0 | Yadanarbon |
| Nay Pyi Taw | 1–0 | Chin United |

== Final ==
Final played on 21 September 2014.

21 September 2014
16:00

| Ayeyawady United | 2–0 | Nay Pyi Taw |
|---|---|---|
| | Report |

Thuwunna Stadium, Yangon
