= Nay Pyi Taw F.C. =

Nay Pyi Taw Football Club
- Full name: Nay Pyi Taw Football Club
- Nickname: White Elephant
- Founded: 2010; 15 years ago
- Ground: Paung Laung Stadium; Pyinmana, Nay Pyi Taw
- Capacity: 30,000
- Chairman: Phyo Ko Ko Tint San
- Head coach: U Kyaw Min Htoo
- League: Myanmar National League
Home colours	Away colours

Nay Pyi Taw Football Club (Burmese: နေပြည်တော် ဘောလုံးအသင်း) was a professional football club based at Wunna Theikdi Stadium in Nay Pyi Taw, Myanmar. Owned by businessman Phyo Ko Ko Tint San, the club was founded in 2010 and finished as runners-up in MNL Cup 2012.

Nay Pyi Taw F.C. played as semi-professional club (ACE FC) in the Myanmar League, which was the highest football league in Myanmar. The first manager was Zaw Win, and the coach was San Lwin. Since 2010, Nay Pyi Taw Football Club changed as a professional football club to play in the Myanmar National League, which was changed from Myanmar League.

== History ==
Nay Pyi Taw FC is a Myanmar professional football team, established in 2010. While initially based in Yangon, the team was relocated to the capital Nay Pyi Taw in 2011. In that year, Nay Pyi Taw FC football team renovated the Paung Laung Stadium as a modern 15,000 capacity stadium and uses it as its home field.

Nay Pyi Taw FC won by 6 goals over Zwegabin United FC (5 April 2010) as their first ever professional football match win. Their first ever professional hat-trick goal was produced by Aruna who scored his first professional goal against Zwegabin United FC. The 2013 Myanmar National League was a breakthrough season for the club where the team finished as runners-up, its highest position ever, and qualified for the 2014 AFC Cup.

== Performance in AFC Cup ==
=== 2014 ===
Nay Pyi Taw FC qualified for the 2014 AFC Cup and was placed in Group H comprising Kitchee FC from Hong Kong, Tampines Rovers FC from Singapore and Pune FC from India. This was Nay Pyi Taw FC's first foray in Asian level competition. Nay Pyi Taw progressed to the AFC Cup Round of 16 where they met Hanoi T&T in a one-off game to see who progressed to the Quarter-finals of the AFC Cup.

==== Group H ====
Team	Pld	W	D	L	GF	GA	GD	Pts	KIT	NPT	TAM	PUN
(Hong Kong) Kitchee	6	4	1	1	15	5	+10	13		2–0	4–0	2–2
(Myanmar) Nay Pyi Taw	6	2	2	2	10	10	0	8	1–2		3–1	3–3
(Singapore) Tampines Rovers	6	2	0	4	9	16	−7	6 (Note: Tiebreakers: Tampines Rovers and Pune are ranked on head-to-head record.)	0–5	0–1		3–1
(India) Pune	6	1	3	2	12	15	−3	6	2–0	2–2	2–5	

== Honour ==
=== Domestics ===
- Myanmar National League
  - Runners-up (1): 2013
- MFF Cup
  - Runners-up (2): 2012, 2014

=== AFC Competition ===
- AFC Cup
  - Round of 16 (1): 2014

== Sponsorship ==
Period	Sportswear	Sponsor
2010, 2011	(Thailand) FBT	Hotel Ace
2012	(Japan) Nike	KTM
2013	(Malaysia) Warriors	U'JAZZ
2014	(Malaysia) Warriors	-
2017	(Thailand) Warrix Sports	Hotel ACE

== Final squad ==
As of 2016

== Seasons ==
MNL	Pos	P	W	D	L	F	A	Pts	MFF Cup	AFC Cup
2010	10th	20	3	3	14	25	36	12	Quarter-Finals	-
2011	6th	22	8	6	8	33	28	30	Runners-up	-
2012	7th	26	12	6	8	38	25	42	Quarter-Finals	-
2013	2nd	22	12	6	4	36	21	42	Group Stage	-
2014	6th	21	10	2	9	33	31	32	Runner Up	Round of 16
2015	12th	22	4	5	13	22	42	17	2nd round	-
2016 MNL-2	3rd	22	15	3	4	62	29	38	2nd round	-
