= Petar Miloševski Football Stadium =

Football stadium in Bitola, North Macedonia

Coordinates: 41°01′05″N 21°20′20″E

Petar Miloševski Stadium Стадион Петар Милошевски
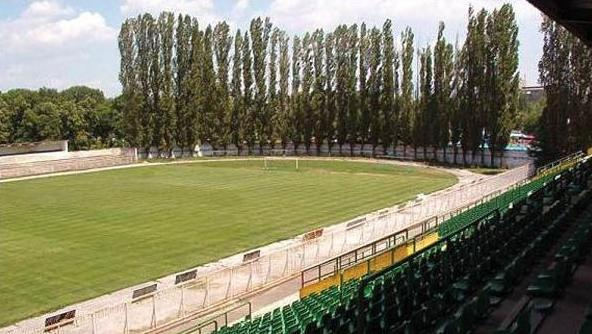
- Interactive map of Petar Miloševski Stadium; Стадион Петар Милошевски
- Full name: Petar Miloševski Football Stadium
- Former names: City stadium under Tumbe Kafe; Tumbe Kafe stadium
- Location: Gradski stadion bb, 7000; Bitola, North Macedonia
- Owner: Municipality of Bitola
- Capacity: 8,587 (all-seater)
- Surface: Grass
- Field size: 100 x 65 meters

Construction
- Opened: 1937
- Renovated: 2015-2024 (north stand)
- Expanded: 1980 (south stand)

Tenant
- FK Pelister

Petar Miloševski Stadium (Macedonian: Стадион Петар Милошевски) is a football stadium in Bitola, North Macedonia and the home of FK Pelister. The stadium is divided into two stands: North, which consists of 4,500 seats among which is the press box along with the team pads, and the South, which consists mainly of the Pelister supporters and seats about 5,000. When the final construction project is complete, the stadium will have a capacity of 10,000.

== History ==
The stadium was built back in 1937.

A record paid attendance of 9,700 was set in March of 1991 for the Yugoslav Cup match against Hajduk Split.

Pelister have hosted European cup matches at Tumbe Kafe on four occasions. Swiss club St. Gallen was the last team to visit the stadium back on 9 August 2001 for the UEFA Cup. The stadium is most remembered for the violence that occurred back on 13 June 1993, before a Macedonian First League fixture between eternal rivals Pelister and Vardar. The match never got started because Pelister supporters Čkembari set fire to the wooden bleacher seats, collapsed the old protective fence and clashed with the police. During the incident, most of the south stand was destroyed.

In June 2010, several necropolises were discovered at Tumbe Kafe that may date back to the third century.

On 2 June 2012, the stadium was host to a relegation/promotion play-off match between FK Teteks and FK Skopje.

In December 2021, The Association of Citizens and Veterans of FK Pelister submitted a request to the Bitola Municipality Council to be considered on 27 December, referring to the name of the city stadium. The famous "Tumbe Kafe" gets a new character, is being renovated and will be given a modern grandstand. The association's initiative to be considered on Monday is to rename the stadium. The new name would be the Petar Miloševski Football Stadium, in honor of the former Macedonian national team goalkeeper.

On 27 December 2021, The Bitola Municipality Council decided at its regular session today to change the name of the football stadium from "Pod Tumbe Kafe" to the Petar Miloševski Football Stadium.

== Reconstruction and expansion ==
On 8 April 2014, Bitola mayor Vladimir Taleski along with architectural firm MEGARON Engineering from Skopje, promoted a new stadium reconstruction. According to the plan, the construction work is set to begin in June 2014 and the investment is worth over €8 million. The stadium will have a capacity of 12,000 seats and would be a UEFA category two standard which means it will be able to host European and international matches. Three new stands are to be built and the current southern stand is to be overhauled, along with adding an athletic track around the pitch. In the press release Taleski stated, "We are going to build a stadium that Bitola has never had since the time of Heraclea. The realization of the project will start on June 1, where the largest investment and contents are related to the northern stand which is to amount to about €4.5 million, while the total amount of the whole stadium is around €8 million."

In April 2015, renovations began of UEFA's "Hat-trick 4" project.

== Sakame Stadion campaign ==
In 2014, citizens of Bitola began an internet campaign called "Sakame Stadion", or "We Want a Stadium". The main reason for the campaign was to generate support for building a new stadium in Bitola. It was also to bring notice of the current stadium's deteriorating condition and put pressure on mayor Taleski to fulfil his campaign promise from 2012. The "Sakame Stadion" motto has now been used on hundreds of occasions, by fans, citizens and representatives of the Macedonian diaspora around the world. Photos of people holding the message on paper are published regularly online, among those from famous sportsmen (most notably footballers Goran Pandev and Gonzalo Higuaín), reporters, celebrities, officials and football clubs from Macedonia and beyond.
