= Riste Naumov =

Macedonian football forward (born 1981)

Personal information
- Full name: Riste Naumov; Ристе Наумов
- Date of birth: 14 April 1981 (age 45)
- Place of birth: Štip, SFR Yugoslavia
- Height: 1.83 m (6 ft 0 in)
- Position: Forward

Team information
- Current team: Bregalnica Štip
- Number: 11

Youth career
- Bregalnica Štip

Senior career*
Years	Team	Apps	(Gls)
1999–2000	Bregalnica Štip		
2000–2003	Cementarnica 55	76	(19)
2003–2006	Vardar Skopje	79	(45)
2007–2008	Omonia Nicosia	6	(1)
2008	Ethnikos Achnas	18	(12)
2008–2009	Viktoria Žižkov	22	(10)
2009–2011	Slavia Prague	14	(3)
2012	Spartak Trnava	0	(0)
2012–2013	Bregalnica Štip	20	(8)
2013	Zwekapin United	12	(5)
2013–2014	Bregalnica Štip	27	(9)
2014	Maziya	9	(7)
2015	Ayeyawady United	32	(28)
2016	Eagles		
2017–2020	Bregalnica Štip		
Total		315	(147)

International career^{‡}
1999	Macedonia U19	1	(0)
2001–2002	Macedonia U21	7	(0)
2005	Macedonia	2	(0)
- * Club domestic league appearances and goals as of 1 February 2012 ‡ National team caps and goals as of 13 November 2010

Riste Naumov (Macedonian: Ристе Наумов; born 14 April 1981) is a retired Macedonian football forward.

== Club career ==
Following his transfer from AC Omonia in January 2008 to Ethnikos Achnas, Naumov was a prolific goal-scorer, scoring 12 goals in 16 appearances and was therefore the leading scorer in the second round of the Cypriot first division. At FK Viktoria Žižkov, who were at that time in the Czech First League, he played regularly and was their top scorer in a season (2008–9) which saw them relegated. His move to SK Slavia Prague came as a result. However at Slavia he only managed 14 appearances, several as substitute, in two seasons and was released at the end of the 2010–11 season.

He retired at the end of the 2020/21 season at Bregalnica Štip after winning promotion with his boyhood club.

== International career ==
He made his senior debut for Macedonia in a November 2005 friendly match against Iran and his second and final international was two days later against Paraguay.
