= 2015–16 FK Vardar season =

Vardar
2015–16 season
- Owner: Sergei Samsonenko
- Chairman: Mirko Spaseski
- Manager: Sergey Andreyev; Goce Sedloski
- Stadium: Philip II Arena
- First League: 1st
- Macedonian Cup: Quarter-finals
- Super Cup: Winners
- Champions League: Second Qualifying Round
- Top goalscorer: League: Dejan Blazhevski (9); All: Dejan Blazhevski (10)
- Highest home attendance: 22,540 vs APOEL; 21 July 2015
- Lowest home attendance: 150 vs Sileks; 10 December 2015
Home colours	Away colours

The 2015–16 season was FK Vardar's 24th consecutive season in the First League. This article shows player statistics and all official matches that the club will play during the 2015–16 season.

== Squad ==
As of 20 February 2016

Note: Flags indicate national team as defined under FIFA eligibility rules; some limited exceptions apply. Players may hold more than one non-FIFA nationality.

No.	Pos.	Nation	Player
28	GK	MKD	Tome Pachovski
41	GK	CRO	Matija Kobetić
90	GK	MKD	Filip Gačevski
3	DF	MKD	Goran Popov
4	DF	MNE	Nemanja Mijušković
5	DF	MKD	Zlatko Tanevski (captain)
6	DF	MKD	Boban Grncharov (vice-captain)
14	DF	MKD	Darko Velkovski
19	DF	ARM	Hovhannes Hambardzumyan
21	DF	UKR	Yevhen Novak
32	DF	MKD	Darko Glišić
77	DF	MKD	Vladica Brdarovski
7	MF	MKD	Blagoja Ljamchevski

No.	Pos.	Nation	Player
8	MF	MKD	Stefan Spirovski
9	MF	MKD	Dejan Blazhevski
10	MF	ARM	Artak Dashyan
11	MF	MKD	Jasir Asani
16	MF	MKD	Nikola Gligorov
20	MF	MKD	Boban Nikolov
26	MF	MKD	Hristijan Denkovski
70	MF	BRA	Juan Felipe
87	MF	MKD	Vlatko Grozdanoski
97	MF	MKD	Petar Petkovski
99	MF	MNE	Damir Kojašević
17	FW	MKD	Aco Stojkov
18	FW	SRB	Dragan Ćeran
22	FW	MKD	Filip Ivanovski

=== Left club during season ===
Note: Flags indicate national team as defined under FIFA eligibility rules; some limited exceptions apply. Players may hold more than one non-FIFA nationality.

No.	Pos.	Nation	Player
1	GK	MNE	Igor Pavlović (released)
9	FW	MKD	Filip Petkovski (to FK Shkupi)
24	MF	MKD	Aleksandar Temelkov (to FK Bregalnica Shtip)
34	DF	MKD	Dino Najdoski (released)

No.	Pos.	Nation	Player
58	FW	USA	Cesar Romero (to Coras de Tepic)
—	FW	MKD	Dimitar Ivanov (released)
—	MF	MKD	Viktor Serafimovski (to FK Gorno Lisiche)
—	DF	MKD	Stojan Stojchevski (to FK Teteks)

== Competitions ==
=== Supercup ===
23 September 2015 Final	Vardar	1–1 (a.e.t.) (4–3 p)	Rabotnichki	Skopje
20:00	Ivanovski 11'	Report	Ilijoski 47'	Stadium: Philip II Arena; Attendance: 1,500; Referee: Aleksandar Stavrev (Skopje)
	Penalties
	Hambardzumyan (penalty scored); Stojkov (penalty scored); Ivanovski (penalty missed); Gligorov (penalty scored); Felipe (penalty scored)		Cikarski (penalty scored); Vujčić (penalty scored); Ilievski (penalty scored); Altiparmakovski (penalty missed); Ristevski (penalty missed)

=== First League ===
==== League table ====
===== First phase =====
Pos	Team	Pld	W	D	L	GF	GA	GD	Pts	Qualification
1	Vardar	27	20	5	2	59	15	+44	65	Qualification for the championship round
2	Shkëndija	27	19	6	2	62	21	+41	63	Qualification for the championship round
3	Sileks	27	11	7	9	32	32	0	40	Qualification for the championship round
4	Shkupi	27	9	11	7	28	25	+3	38	Qualification for the championship round
5	Rabotnichki	27	8	12	7	32	26	+6	36	Qualification for the championship round

Source: MacedonianFootball.com, Soccerway
Rules for classification: 1) Points; 2) Goal difference; 3) Goals scored; 4) Head-to-head points; 5) Head-to-head goal difference; 6) Head-to-head away goals scored (only if two teams); 7) Head-to-head goals scored; 8) Draw; 9) Play-off. (Note: Criteria 2, 3 and 8 is only used if not deciding teams for championship or relegation round).

===== Second phase =====
Pos	Team	Pld	W	D	L	GF	GA	GD	Pts	Qualification
1	Vardar (C)	32	25	5	2	67	17	+50	80	Qualification for the Champions League second qualifying round
2	Shkëndija	32	23	6	3	74	24	+50	75	Qualification for the Europa League first qualifying round (Note: Shkëndija qualified for the Europa League first qualifying round by winning the 2015–16 Macedonian Football Cup.)
3	Sileks	32	12	8	12	35	40	−5	44	Qualification for the Europa League first qualifying round
4	Rabotnichki	32	10	13	9	36	30	+6	43	Qualification for the Europa League first qualifying round
5	Bregalnica Shtip	32	10	8	14	42	49	−7	38	
6	Shkupi	32	9	11	12	29	34	−5	38	

Source: MacedonianFootball.com, Soccerway
Rules for classification: 1) Points; 2) Goal difference; 3) Goals scored; 4) Head-to-head points; 5) Head-to-head goal difference; 6) Head-to-head away goals scored (only if two teams); 7) Head-to-head goals scored; 8) Draw; 9) Play-off. (Note: Criteria 2, 3 and 8 is only used if not deciding Champion or teams for UEFA competitions).
(C) Champions

==== Results summary ====
Overall								Home						Away					
Pld	W	D	L	GF	GA	GD	Pts	W	D	L	GF	GA	GD	W	D	L	GF	GA	GD
32	25	5	2	67	17	+50	80	14	3	0	42	9	+33	11	2	2	25	8	+17

==== Results by round ====
Round	1	2	3	4	5	6	7	8	9	10	11	12	13	14	15	16	17	18	19	20	21	22	23	24	25	26	27	28	29	30	31	32
Ground	H	A	H	H	A	H	A	H	A	A	H	A	A	H	A	H	A	H	H	A	H	A	H	A	H	A	H	H	H	A	H	A
Result	D	W	W	W	W	W	D	W	W	W	D	W	W	W	L	W	D	W	W	W	W	W	W	W	W	L	D	W	W	W	W	W
Position	6	2	1	1	1	1	2	2	2	1	1	1	1	1	1	1	1	1	1	1	1	1	1	1	1	1	1	1	1	1	1	1

Source: Competitive Matches
A = Away; H = Home; W = Win; D = Draw; L = Loss

==== Matches ====
===== First phase =====
9 August 2015 1	Vardar	2–2	Shkupi	Skopje
20:00	Blazhevski 66' (pen.); Ivanovski 87'	Report	Nuhiji 22'; Osmani 90'	Stadium: Philip II Arena; Attendance: 1,000; Referee: Aleksandar Stavrev (Skopje)

16 August 2015 2	Shkëndija	1–3	Vardar	Kumanovo
17:30	Radeski 42'	Report	Ivanovski 19'; Felipe 88'; Romero 90'	Stadium: Stadion Baškimi; Attendance: 3,000; Referee: Dimitar Mechkarovski (Skopje)

23 August 2015 3	Vardar	6–0	Mladost (CD)	Skopje
16:30	Blazhevski 9', 35'; Hambardzumyan 45'; Dashyan 55', 62'; Ljamchevski 76'	Report		Stadium: Stadion Gjorche Petrov; Attendance: 700; Referee: Josip Barton (Tetovo)

26 August 2015 4	Vardar	1–0	Metalurg Skopje	Skopje
16:30	Blazhevski 14' (pen.)	Report		Stadium: Stadion Gjorche Petrov; Attendance: 300; Referee: Faton Mustafi (Tetovo)

29 August 2015 5	Bregalnica Shtip	0–2	Vardar	Kochani
16:30		Report	Blazhevski 5'; Felipe 24'	Stadium: Stadion Nikola Mantov; Attendance: 1,200; Referee: Dejan Jakimovski (Skopje)

13 September 2015 6	Vardar	5–1	Horizont Turnovo	Skopje
16:00	Ivanovski 16'; Blazhevski 18', 66'; Romero 35', 45' (red card) 59'	Report	Ivanov 90'	Stadium: Philip II Arena; Attendance: 200; Referee: Dalibor Gjorgjevski (Kumanovo)

20 September 2015 7	Renova	0–0	Vardar	Bogovinje
15:30		Report		Stadium: Stadion Bogovinje; Attendance: 300; Referee: Stevche Shuleski (Ohrid)

27 September 2015 8	Vardar	2–1	Rabotnichki	Skopje
15:30	Ivanovski 51'; Romero (red card) 82'; Popov 90+3'	Report	Ilijoski 23'	Stadium: Philip II Arena; Attendance: 400; Referee: Dejan Jakimovski (Skopje)

4 October 2015 9	Sileks	0–3	Vardar	Kratovo
15:00		Report	Mijušković 30'; Hambardzumyan 64'; J. Asani 84'	Stadium: Stadion Sileks; Attendance: 800; Referee: Faton Mustafi (Tetovo)

18 October 2015 10	Shkupi	0–3	Vardar	Skopje
14:30		Report	Ivanovski 8'; Blazhevski 36'; Ljamchevski 90'	Stadium: Stadion Chair; Attendance: 3,000; Referee: Josip Barton (Tetovo)

25 October 2015 11	Vardar	0–0	Shkëndija	Skopje
13:30		Report		Stadium: Philip II Arena; Attendance: 1,000; Referee: Zorancho Temelkov (Kavadarci)

28 October 2015 12	Mladost (CD)	0–1	Vardar	Ohrid
13:30		Report	Felipe 37' (pen.)	Stadium: SRC Biljanini Izvori; Attendance: 200; Referee: Riste Sejmenov (Strumica)

1 November 2015 13	Metalurg Skopje	0–1	Vardar	Skopje
13:30		Report	Romero 20'	Stadium: Stadion Zhelezarnica; Attendance: 300; Referee: Faton Mustafi (Tetovo)

8 November 2015 14	Vardar	3–1	Bregalnica Shtip	Skopje
13:00	Ivanovski 27'; Hambardzumyan 79'; Spirovski 85'	Report	Nacev 6'	Stadium: Philip II Arena; Attendance: 400; Referee: Dalibor Gjorgjevski (Kumanovo)

22 November 2015 15	Horizont Turnovo	2–1	Vardar	Turnovo
13:00	Pandev 49'; Najdenov 88'	Report	Stojkov 78'	Stadium: Stadion Kukush; Attendance: 1,000; Referee: Josip Barton (Tetovo)

29 November 2015 16	Vardar	2–0	Renova	Skopje
13:00	Dashyan 47'; P. Petkovski 79'	Report		Stadium: Philip II Arena; Attendance: 400; Referee: Zorancho Temelkov (Kavadarci)

5 December 2015 17	Rabotnichki	1–1	Vardar	Veles
13:00	Vujčić 79' (pen.)	Report	P. Petkovski 9'	Stadium: Gradski stadion Attendance: 300; Referee: Dejan Jakimovski (Skopje)

10 December 2015 18	Vardar	4–0	Sileks	Veles
13:00	Grncharov 29'; Ivanovski 72'; Stojkov 76', 86'	Report		Stadium: Gradski stadion Attendance: 150; Referee: Riste Sejmenov (Strumica)

21 February 2016 19	Vardar	4–1	Renova	Skopje
14:00	Ćeran 23', 68'; Felipe 37'; Blazhevski 77'	Report	Gafuri 90'	Stadium: Philip II Arena; Attendance: 500; Referee: Dalibor Gjorgjevski (Kumanovo)

28 February 2016 20	Horizont Turnovo	0–1	Vardar	Turnovo
14:00		Report	Hambardzumyan 52'	Stadium: Stadion Kukush; Attendance: 800; Referee: Dimitar Mechkarovski (Skopje)

8 March 2016 21	Vardar	4–0	Bregalnica Shtip	Skopje
14:00	Grncharov 6', 73'; Felipe 37' (pen.); Hambardzumyan 59'	Report		Stadium: Philip II Arena; Referee: Zorancho Temelkov (Kavadarci)

13 March 2016 22	Mladost (CD)	0–3	Vardar	Ohrid
14:00		Summary	Ćeran 14' (pen.); Nikolov 58'; Hambardzumyan 80'	Stadium: SRC Biljanini Izvori; Attendance: 200; Referee: Josip Barton (Tetovo)

19 March 2016 23	Vardar	2–1	Metalurg Skopje	Skopje
14:00	Kojašević 26' (pen.); Ćeran 80'	Summary	Xh. Asani 72'	Stadium: Philip II Arena; Attendance: 400; Referee: Riste Sejmenov (Strumica)

3 April 2016 24	Shkupi	0–1	Vardar	Skopje
16:00		Report	Juan Felipe 68'	Stadium: Stadion Chair; Attendance: 4,000; Referee: Dimitar Mechkarovski (Skopje)

6 April 2016 25	Vardar	1–0	Rabotnichki	Skopje
				Stadium: Philip II Arena

10 April 2016 26	Sileks	3–2	Vardar	Kratovo
16:00				Stadium: Stadion Sileks

17 April 2016 27	Vardar	1–1	Shkëndija	Skopje
16:00				Stadium: Philip II Arena

=== Macedonian Cup ===
==== First round ====
12 August 2015	Kozhuf Miravci	0–1	Vardar	Gevgelija
17:30		Report	Blazhevski 32' (pen.)	Stadium: Gradski stadion Referee: Stojanche Stojanov (Shtip)

==== Second round ====
30 September 2015 First leg	Vardar	4–1	Pelister	Skopje
17:00	Dashyan 21'; Velkovski 26'; Hambardzumyan 45'; Grncharov 64'	Report	Nedanoski 58'	Stadium: Philip II Arena; Attendance: 300; Referee: Zorancho Temelkov (Kavadarci)

21 October 2015 Second leg	Pelister	0–2 (1–6 agg.)	Vardar	Prilep
14:30		Report	Trajkovski 27' (o.g.); Stojkov 40' (pen.)	Stadium: Stadion Goce Delchev; Attendance: 1,000; Referee: Goran Spirkoski (Prilep)

==== Quarter-finals ====
26 November 2015 First leg	Shkëndija	3–0	Vardar	Skopje
13:00	Júnior 22'; Cuculi 41'; Radeski 90'	Report		Stadium: Stadion Chair; Attendance: 3,000; Referee: Aleksandar Stavrev (Skopje)

2 December 2015 Second leg	Vardar	1–2 (1–5 agg.)	Shkëndija	Skopje
13:00	Mijušković 60'	Report	Júnior 43'; Kirovski 82'	Stadium: Stadion Gjorche Petrov; Attendance: 1,500; Referee: Dimitar Mechkarovski (Skopje)

=== UEFA Champions League ===
==== Second qualifying round ====
14 July 2015 First leg	APOEL (Cyprus)	0–0	(North Macedonia) Vardar	Nicosia
19:00		Report		Stadium: GSP Stadium; Attendance: 14,531; Referee: Aliyar Aghayev (Azerbaijan)

21 July 2015 Second leg	Vardar (North Macedonia)	1–1 (1–1a agg.)	(Cyprus) APOEL	Skopje
20:00	Ljamchevski 90+4'	Report	De Vincenti 60'	Stadium: Philip II Arena; Attendance: 22,540; Referee: Davide Massa (Italy)

== Statistics ==
=== Top scorers ===
Rank	Name	League	Europe	Cup	Supercup	Total
1	(North Macedonia) Dejan Blazhevski	9	–	1	–	10
2	(North Macedonia) Filip Ivanovski	7	–	–	1	8
3	(Armenia) Hovhannes Hambardzumyan	5	–	1	–	6
4	(Brazil) Juan Felipe	5	–	–	–	5
5	(Armenia) Artak Dashyan	3	–	1	–	4
5	(North Macedonia) Boban Grncharov	3	–	1	–	4
5	(United States) Cesar Romero	4	–	–	–	4
5	(North Macedonia) Aco Stojkov	3	–	1	–	4
9	(North Macedonia) Blagoja Ljamchevski	2	1	–	–	3
10	(Serbia) Dragan Ćeran	2	–	–	–	2
10	(Montenegro) Nemanja Mijušković	1	–	1	–	2
10	(North Macedonia) Petar Petkovski	2	–	–	–	2
13	(North Macedonia) Jasir Asani	1	–	–	–	1
13	(North Macedonia) Goran Popov	1	–	–	–	1
13	(North Macedonia) Stefan Spirovski	1	–	–	–	1
13	(North Macedonia) Darko Velkovski	–	–	1	–	1
	Own goals	–	–	1	–	1
	TOTALS	49	1	8	1	59

- Players whose names are written with Italic letters played only in the first half of the season.
