= 2017–18 FK Vardar season =

Vardar
2017–18 season
- Owner: Sergei Samsonenko
- Chairman: Mirko Spaseski
- Manager: Goce Sedloski; Chedomir Janevski; Boban Babunski
- Stadium: Philip II Arena
- First League: 2nd
- Macedonian Cup: Quarter-finals
- Champions League: Third qualifying round
- Europa League: Group stage
- Top goalscorer: League: Tigran Barseghyan (2); All: Tigran Barseghyan (4)
- Highest home attendance: 20,863 vs Fenerbahçe; 17 August 2017
- Lowest home attendance: 500 vs Pobeda; 20 August 2017
Home colours	Away colours

The 2017–18 season was FK Vardar's 26th consecutive season in the First League.

== Squad ==
As of 25 August 2017

Note: Flags indicate national team as defined under FIFA eligibility rules; some limited exceptions apply. Players may hold more than one non-FIFA nationality.

No.	Pos.	Nation	Player
1	GK	MKD	Igor Aleksovski
3	DF	MKD	Goran Popov
5	DF	MKD	Visar Musliu
6	DF	MKD	Boban Grncharov (captain)
7	MF	GEO	Jambul Jighuari
8	MF	SRB	Vanja Marković
9	FW	MKD	Dejan Blazhevski
10	MF	MKD	Boban Nikolov
11	MF	ARM	Tigran Barseghyan
14	DF	MKD	Darko Velkovski
16	MF	MKD	Nikola Gligorov
17	FW	MKD	Aco Stojkov
18	FW	MKD	Bojan Kolevski

No.	Pos.	Nation	Player
19	DF	ARM	Hovhannes Hambardzumyan
21	DF	UKR	Yevhen Novak
22	MF	MKD	Filip Stojchevski
23	DF	MKD	Besir Demiri
28	GK	MKD	Tome Pachovski
32	DF	MKD	Darko Glishikj
33	MF	MKD	Besar Iseni
48	FW	BRA	Ytalo
70	MF	BRA	Juan Felipe Ribeiro
77	DF	MKD	Vladica Brdarovski
90	GK	MKD	Filip Gačevski
97	FW	MKD	Petar Petkovski
-	FW	RUS	Maksim Maksimov

=== Left club during season ===
Note: Flags indicate national team as defined under FIFA eligibility rules; some limited exceptions apply. Players may hold more than one non-FIFA nationality.

No.	Pos.	Nation	Player
8	MF	MKD	Stefan Spirovski (to Ferencváros)
10	MF	MNE	Damir Kojašević (to Vojvodina)
89	FW	BRA	Jonathan Balotelli (to Al-Gharafa)
—	MF	GHA	Moustapha Quaynor (on loan to Pelister)

== Competitions ==
=== First League ===
==== League table ====
Pos	Team	Pld	W	D	L	GF	GA	GD	Pts	Qualification or relegation
1	Shkëndija (C)	36	29	4	3	101	27	+74	91	Qualification for the Champions League first qualifying round
2	Vardar	36	16	8	12	53	41	+12	56	Qualification for the Europa League first qualifying round
3	Rabotnički	36	14	10	12	50	43	+7	52	Qualification for the Europa League first qualifying round
4	Shkupi	36	13	12	11	51	46	+5	51	Qualification for the Europa League first qualifying round
5	Sileks	36	13	11	12	30	37	−7	50	

Source: MacedonianFootball.com, Soccerway
Rules for classification: 1) Points; 2) Goal difference; 3) Goals scored; 4) Head-to-head points; 5) Head-to-head goal difference; 6) Head-to-head away goals scored (only if two teams); 7) Head-to-head goals scored; 8) Draw; 9) Play-off. (Note: Criteria 2, 3 and 8 is only used if not deciding Champion, teams for UEFA competitions or relegation).
(C) Champions

==== Results summary ====
Overall								Home						Away					
Pld	W	D	L	GF	GA	GD	Pts	W	D	L	GF	GA	GD	W	D	L	GF	GA	GD
36	16	8	12	53	41	+12	56	12	1	5	36	19	+17	4	7	7	17	22	−5

==== Results by round ====
Round	1	2	3	4	5	6	7	8	9	10	11	12	13	14	15	16	17	18	19	20	21	22	23	24	25	26	27	28	29	30	31	32	33	34	35	36
Ground	A	H	A	H	A	H	A	A	H	H	A	A	A	H	A	H	H	H	A	H	A	H	A	H	A	A	H	H	A	H	A	H	A	H	H	A
Result	L	W	L	W	D	W	W	W	W	W	L	L	D	W	W	W	W	W	D	W	L	L	D	W	D	D	D	L	L	L	W	L	D	L	W	L
Position	10	5	5	4	4	3	3	3	3	2	2	2	3	3	2	2	2	2	2	2	2	2	2	2	2	2	2	2	2	2	2	2	2	2	2	2

Source: Competitive Matches
A = Away; H = Home; W = Win; D = Draw; L = Loss; P = Postponed

==== Matches ====
12 August 2017 1	Shkëndija	2–0	Vardar	Tetovo
17:00	Alimi 62'; Júnior 66'	Report		Stadium: Gradski stadion Attendance: 10,000; Referee: Dimitar Mechkarovski (Skopje)

20 August 2017 2	Vardar	4–0	Pobeda	Skopje
17:00	Barseghyan 4'; Kojašević 45+1'; Ytalo 68'; Felipe 86' (pen.)	Report		Stadium: Stadion Gjorche Petrov; Attendance: 500; Referee: Dimitar Mechkarovski (Skopje)

10 September 2017 4	Vardar	3–1	Sileks	Skopje
16:00	Grncharov 19'; Barseghyan 57'; Gligorov 66'	Report	Đorđević 73'	Stadium: Philip II Arena; Attendance: 300; Referee: Aleksandar Stavrev (Skopje)

17 September 2017 5	Skopje	1–1	Vardar	Skopje
15:30		Report	Juan Felipe 27'; Grncharov (red card) 51'	Stadium: Stadion Zhelezarnica; Attendance: 500; Referee: Dimitar Mechkarovski (Skopje)

20 September 2017 6	Vardar	2–1	Renova	Skopje
15:30	Barseghyan 26'; Alves 83'	Report	Ramadani 41'	Stadium: Boris Trajkovski Stadium; Attendance: 400; Referee: Aleksandar Stavrev (Skopje)

24 September 2017 7	Pelister	0–1	Vardar	Bitola
15:30		Report	Blazhevski 30'	Stadium: Stadion Tumbe Kafe; Attendance: 5,000; Referee: Aleksandar Stavrev (Skopje)

1 October 2017 9	Vardar	1–0	Shkupi	Skopje
15:00	Barseghyan 57'	Report		Stadium: Philip II Arena; Attendance: 300; Referee: Konstantin Vlaho (Skopje)

14 October 2017 10	Vardar	4–2	Shkëndija	Skopje
14:30	4		2	Stadium: Philip II Arena; Attendance: 500

22 October 2017 11	Pobeda	1–0	Vardar	Prilep
14:30	1		0	Stadium: Stadion Goce Delchev

25 October 2017 3	Rabotnichki	3–1	Vardar	Skopje
14:30	3		1	Stadium: Philip II Arena; Referee: Dimitar Mechkarovski (Skopje)

29 October 2017 13	Sileks	0–0	Vardar	Kratovo
13:30	0		0	Stadium: Stadion Sileks

5 November 2017 14	Vardar	3–0	Skopje	Skopje
13:30	3		0	Stadium: Philip II Arena

16 November 2017 15	Renova	2–5	Vardar	Tetovo
13:00	2		5	Stadium: Gradski stadion

19 November 2017 16	Vardar	1–0	Pelister	Skopje
18:00	1		0	Stadium: Philip II Arena

26 November 2017 8	Akademija Pandev	1–3	Vardar	Strumica
14:00	1		3	Stadium: Stadion Mladost

3 December 2017 18	Shkupi	2–0	Vardar	Skopje
13:00	2		0	Stadium: Stadion Chair

13 December 2017 12	Vardar	1–0	Rabotnichki	Skopje
14:30	1		0	Stadium: Philip II Arena

14 February 2018 19	Shkëndija	1–1	Vardar	Tetovo
14:00	1		1	Stadium: Gradski stadion

18 February 2018 20	Vardar	3–0	Pobeda	Skopje
				Stadium: Philip II Arena

24 February 2018 21	Rabotnichki	2–1	Vardar	Skopje
				Stadium: Philip II Arena

4 March 2018 22	Vardar	2–3	Sileks	Skopje
				Stadium: Philip II Arena

11 March 2018 23	Skopje	0–0	Vardar	Skopje
				Stadium: Stadion Zhelezarnica

17 March 2018 24	Vardar	1–0	Renova	Skopje
				Stadium: Philip II Arena

1 April 2018 25	Pelister	0–0	Vardar	Bitola
				Stadium: Stadion Tumbe Kafe

7 April 2018 26	Akademija Pandev	1–1	Vardar	Strumica
				Stadium: Stadion Mladost

15 April 2018 27	Vardar	1–1	Shkupi	Skopje
				Stadium: Philip II Arena

18 April 2018 28	Vardar	2–3	Shkëndija	Skopje
				Stadium: Philip II Arena

22 April 2018 29	Pobeda	2–0	Vardar	Prilep
				Stadium: Stadion Goce Delchev

25 April 2018 30	Vardar	0–1	Rabotnichki	Skopje
				Stadium: Philip II Arena

29 April 2018 31	Sileks	0–2	Vardar	Kratovo
				Stadium: Stadion Sileks

2 May 2018 32	Vardar	0–1	Skopje	Skopje
				Stadium: Philip II Arena

6 May 2018 33	Renova	1–1	Vardar	Tetovo
				Stadium: Gradski stadion

13 May 2018 34	Vardar	2–3	Pelister	Skopje
				Stadium: Philip II Arena

16 May 2018 35	Vardar	3–2	Akademija Pandev	Skopje
				Stadium: Philip II Arena

20 May 2018 36	Shkupi	4–1	Vardar	Skopje
				Stadium: Stadion Chair

=== Macedonian Cup ===
==== First round ====
31 August 2017	Lokomotiva	1–4	Vardar	Skopje
16:30	Stojanovski 86'	Report	Blazhevski 21'; Iseni 30', 90'; Demiri 39'	Stadium: Lokomotiva Stadium; Attendance: 400; Referee: Konstantin Vlaho (Skopje)

==== Second round ====
30 November 2017 First leg	Vardar	1–1	Shkupi	Skopje
	1		1	Stadium: Philip II Arena; Referee: Zorancho Temelkov (Kavadarci)

17 December 2017 Second leg	Shkupi	0–2 (1–3 agg.)	Vardar	Skopje
	0		2	Stadium: Stadion Chair

==== Quarter-finals ====
21 February 2018 First leg	Vardar	1–1	Shkëndija	Skopje
				Stadium: Philip II Arena

7 March 2018 Second leg	Shkëndija	4–0 (5–1 agg.)	Vardar	Tetovo
13:00				Stadium: Gradski stadion

=== UEFA Champions League ===
==== Second qualifying round ====
12 July 2017 First leg	Malmö FF (Sweden)	1–1	(North Macedonia) Vardar	Malmö
19:00	Brorsson 75'	Report	Nikolov 63'	Stadium: Swedbank Stadion; Attendance: 20,058; Referee: Þorvaldur Árnason (Iceland)

18 July 2017 Second leg	Vardar (North Macedonia)	3–1 (4–2 agg.)	(Sweden) Malmö FF	Strumica
18:00	Grncharov 56'; Barseghyan 61'; Nikolov 90+1'	Report	Rosenberg 16' (pen.)	Stadium: Stadion Mladost (Note: Vardar played their second qualifying round home match at Stadion Mladost, Strumica, instead of their regular stadium Philip II Arena, Skopje, which was unavailable due to preparation for the 2017 UEFA Super Cup.); Attendance: 2,800; Referee: Anatoliy Zhabchenko (Ukraine)

==== Third qualifying round ====
25 July 2017 First leg	Vardar (North Macedonia)	1–0	(Denmark) Copenhagen	Skopje
20:00	Jonathan 65'	Report		Stadium: Philip II Arena; Attendance: 12,000; Referee: Daniel Siebert (Germany)

2 August 2017 Second leg	Copenhagen (Denmark)	4–1 (4–2 agg.)	(North Macedonia) Vardar	Copenhagen
20:00	Greguš 2', (yellow card) 28' (yellow-red card) 71'; Barseghyan 26' (o.g.); Santander 75'; Sotiriou 88' (pen.)	Report	Nikolov 19'	Stadium: Parken Stadium; Attendance: 15,224; Referee: John Beaton (Scotland)

=== UEFA Europa League ===
==== Play-off round ====
17 August 2017 First leg	Vardar (North Macedonia)	2–0	(Turkey) Fenerbahçe	Skopje
20:00	Barseghyan 20'; Grncharov (yellow card) 51' (yellow-red card) 89'; Topal 90+2' (o.g.)	Report	Souza (red card) 90+3'	Stadium: Philip II Arena; Attendance: 20,863; Referee: Luca Banti (Italy)

24 August 2017 Second leg	Fenerbahçe (Turkey)	1–2 (1–4 agg.)	(North Macedonia) Vardar	Istanbul
19:30	Neustädter 61'	Report	Jighauri 68'; Gligorov 90+1'	Stadium: Şükrü Saracoğlu Stadium; Attendance: 32,480; Referee: Daniel Stefański (Poland)

==== Group stage ====
Pos	Team	Pld	W	D	L	GF	GA	GD	Pts	Qualification	ZEN	RS	ROS	VRD
1	(Russia) Zenit Saint Petersburg	6	5	1	0	17	5	+12	16	Advance to knockout phase	—	3–1	3–1	2–1
2	(Spain) Real Sociedad	6	4	0	2	16	6	+10	12	Advance to knockout phase	1–3	—	4–0	3–0
3	(Norway) Rosenborg	6	1	2	3	6	11	−5	5		1–1	0–1	—	3–1
4	(North Macedonia) Vardar	6	0	1	5	3	20	−17	1		0–5	0–6	1–1	—

Source: UEFA

14 September 2017 1	Vardar (North Macedonia)	0–5	(Russia) Zenit Saint Petersburg	Skopje
21:05		Report	Kokorin 6', 21'; Dzyuba 39'; Ivanović 66'; Rigoni 89'	Stadium: Philip II Arena; Attendance: 11,118; Referee: Jakob Kehlet (Denmark)

28 September 2017 2	Rosenborg (Norway)	3–1	(North Macedonia) Vardar	Trondheim
19:00	Bendtner 25' (pen.); A. Konradsen 56'; Hedenstad 68'	Report	Juan Felipe 90+1'	Stadium: Lerkendal Stadion; Attendance: 16,038; Referee: Georgi Kabakov (Bulgaria)

19 October 2017 3	Vardar (North Macedonia)	0–6	(Spain) Real Sociedad	Skopje
19:00		Report	Oyarzabal 12'; Willian José 34', 42', 55', 59'; De la Bella 90'	Stadium: Philip II Arena; Attendance: 20,368; Referee: Aliyar Aghayev (Azerbaijan)

2 November 2017 4	Real Sociedad (Spain)	3–0	(North Macedonia) Vardar	San Sebastián
21:05	Juanmi 31'; De la Bella 69'; Bautista 81'	Report		Stadium: Anoeta; Attendance: 17,242; Referee: Robert Schörgenhofer (Austria)

23 November 2017 5	Zenit Saint Petersburg (Russia)	2–1	(North Macedonia) Vardar	Saint Petersburg
19:00	Poloz 16'; Rigoni 43'	Report	Blazhevski 90+3'	Stadium: Krestovsky Stadium; Attendance: 38,196; Referee: Bart Vertenten (Belgium)

7 December 2017 6	Vardar (North Macedonia)	1–1	(Norway) Rosenborg	Skopje
21:05	Ytalo 9'	Report	Bendtner 45+2' (pen.)	Stadium: Philip II Arena; Attendance: 7,839; Referee: Serhiy Boyko (Ukraine)

== Statistics ==
=== Top scorers ===
Rank	Name	League	Europe	Cup	Total
1	(Armenia) Tigran Barseghyan	2	2	–	4
2	(North Macedonia) Boban Nikolov	–	3	–	3
3	(North Macedonia) Nikola Gligorov	1	1	–	2
3	(North Macedonia) Boban Grncharov	1	1	–	2
3	(North Macedonia) Besar Iseni	–	–	2	2
6	(North Macedonia) Dejan Blazhevski	–	–	1	1
6	(Brazil) Jonathan Balotelli	–	1	–	1
6	(North Macedonia) Besir Demiri	–	–	1	1
6	(Brazil) Juan Felipe	1	–	–	1
6	(Georgia (country)) Jambul Jighauri	–	1	–	1
6	(Montenegro) Damir Kojašević	1	–	–	1
6	(Brazil) Ytalo	1	–	–	1
	Own goals	–	1	–	1
	TOTALS	7	10	4	21
