= 2015 Macedonian Football Supercup =

2015 Macedonian Supercup
Vardar	Rabotnički
1	1
- Vardar won 4–3 on penalties
- Date: 23 September 2015
- Venue: Philip II Arena, Skopje
- Referee: Aleksandar Stavrev
- Attendance: 1,500
- Weather: Clear

The 2015 Macedonian Supercup was the fourth (officially third) and last Macedonian Football Supercup, an annual Macedonian football match played between the winners of the previous season's First League and Macedonian Cup. The game will be played between Rabotnički, who beat Teteks to win the 2015 Macedonian Cup Final, and Vardar, champions of the 2014–15 First League. It was played at Philip II Arena, Skopje and was won by Vardar by 4–3 on penalties after the match was ended 1–1 after the regular and extra time.

== Match details ==
23 September 2015
20:00 CEST

Vardar	1–1 (a.e.t.)	Rabotnički
Ivanovski 11'	Report	Ilijoski 47'
Penalties
Hambardzumyan (penalty scored); Stojkov (penalty scored); Ivanovski (penalty missed); Gligorov (penalty scored); Felipe (penalty scored)	4–3	(penalty scored) Cikarski; (penalty scored) Vujčić; (penalty scored) Ilievski; (penalty missed) Altiparmakovski; (penalty missed) Ristevski

Philip II Arena, Skopje
Attendance: 1,500
Referee: Aleksandar Stavrev (Skopje)

Vardar	Rabotnički

Vardar:
GK	90	(North Macedonia) Filip Gachevski
DF	19	(Armenia) Hovhannes Hambardzumyan	(yellow card)
DF	4	(Montenegro) Nemanja Mijušković	(yellow card)
DF	14	(North Macedonia) Darko Velkovski		(substituted off) 90'
DF	3	(North Macedonia) Goran Popov
MF	16	(North Macedonia) Nikola Gligorov (c)
MF	20	(North Macedonia) Boban Nikolov
MF	15	(North Macedonia) Petar Petkovski		(substituted off) 56'
MF	70	(Brazil) Juan Felipe
FW	22	(North Macedonia) Filip Ivanovski
FW	17	(North Macedonia) Dejan Blazhevski		(substituted off) 74'
Substitutes:
FW	17	(North Macedonia) Aco Stojkov		(substituted on) 56'
MF	7	(North Macedonia) Blagoja Ljamchevski		(substituted on) 74'
DF	6	(North Macedonia) Boban Grncharov		(substituted on) 90'
Manager:
(North Macedonia) Goce Sedloski

Rabotnički:
GK	77	(North Macedonia) Damjan Shishkovski
DF	27	(North Macedonia) Milan Ilievski	Booked
DF	2	(North Macedonia) Leon Najdovski
DF	14	(North Macedonia) Kire Ristevski
DF	6	(Colombia) Sebastián Herrera	Booked	(substituted off) 75'
MF	24	(North Macedonia) Dushko Trajchevski
MF	17	(North Macedonia) Milovan Petrovikj
MF	26	(North Macedonia) Mite Cikarski
MF	15	(North Macedonia) Kire Markoski
FW	23	(North Macedonia) Milan Ristovski		(substituted off) 59'
FW	19	(North Macedonia) Blazhe Ilijoski (c)	Booked	(substituted off) 65'
Substitutes:
MF	8	(Germany) Stephan Vujčić		(substituted on) 59'
FW	22	(North Macedonia) Marjan Altiparmakovski		(substituted on) 65'
MF	21	(North Macedonia) Ivan Mitrov		(substituted on) 75'
Manager:
(North Macedonia) Igor Angelovski

MATCH OFFICIALS

- Assistant referees:
  - Marjan Kirovski (Skopje)
  - Dejan Kostadinov (Skopje)

Match rules

- 90 minutes.
- 30 minutes of extra-time if necessary.
- Penalty shoot-out if scores level.
- Seven named substitutes, of which up to five may be used.
