= Petar Petkovski =

Macedonian footballer

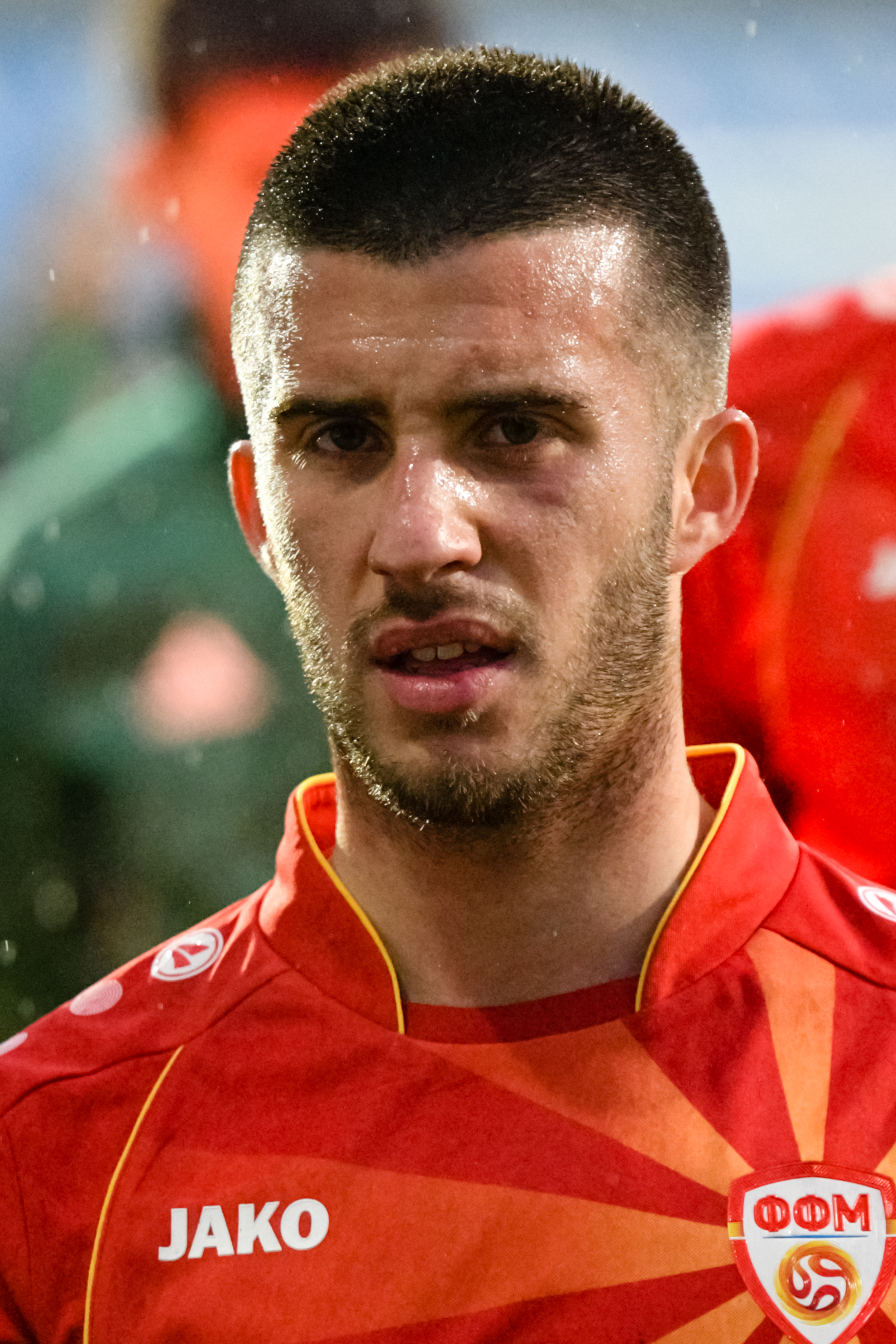

Personal information
- Date of birth: 3 January 1997 (age 29)
- Place of birth: Skopje, Macedonia
- Height: 1.70 m (5 ft 7 in)
- Position: Left winger

Team information
- Current team: Pelister
- Number: 8

Youth career
- –2014: Vardar

Senior career*
| Years | Team | Apps | (Gls) |
| 2015–2017 | Vardar | 44 | (4) |
| 2018–2021 | Rabotnički | 83 | (16) |
| 2021–2023 | Botoșani | 25 | (1) |
| 2023 | Concordia Chiajna | 7 | (2) |
| 2023–2024 | Rabotnički | 26 | (0) |
| 2024–2025 | Concordia Chiajna | 18 | (5) |
| 2025– | Pelister | 22 | (5) |

International career
| 2013 | Macedonia U17 | 2 | (0) |
| 2014–2015 | Macedonia U18 | 3 | (2) |
| 2014–2015 | Macedonia U19 | 8 | (3) |
| 2015–2018 | Macedonia U21 | 12 | (2) |
- * Club domestic league appearances and goals as of 25 May 2026

Petar Petkovski (Macedonian: Петар Петковски, born 3 January 1997) is a Macedonian professional footballer who plays as a left winger for Pelister.

== Honours ==
Vardar

- 1. MFL: 2014–15, 2015–16, 2016–17
- Macedonian Super Cup: 2015
