= Stefan Spirovski =

Macedonian footballer

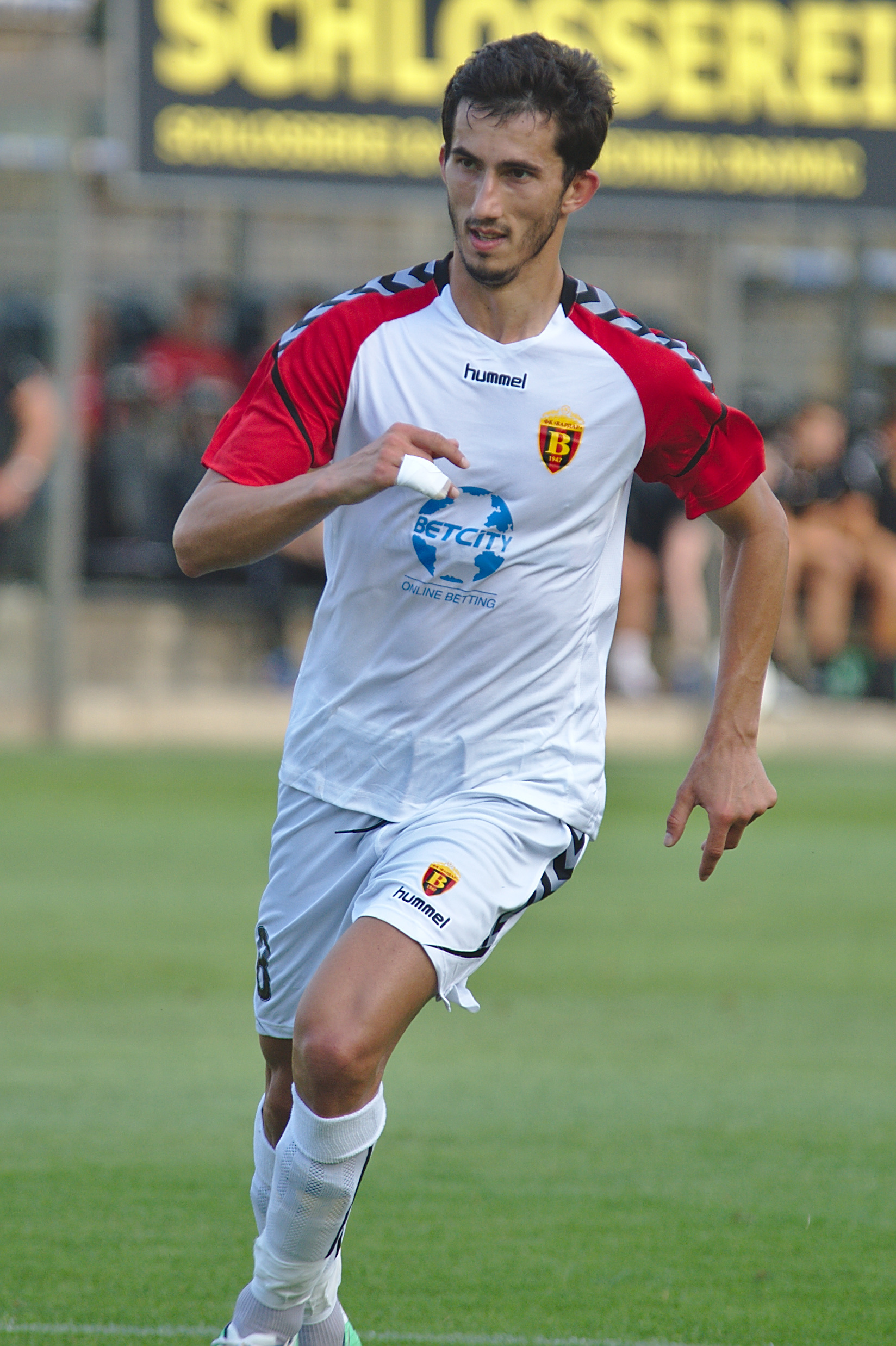
- Spirovski playing for Vardar in 2017

Personal information
- Full name: Stefan Spirovski; Стефан Спировски
- Date of birth: 23 August 1990 (age 36)
- Place of birth: Bitola, SR Macedonia, Yugoslavia
- Height: 1.85 m (6 ft 1 in)
- Position: Central midfielder

Team information
- Current team: Pelister
- Number: 10

Senior career*
Years	Team	Apps	(Gls)
2007–2009	Pelister	42	(2)
2009–2013	Borac Čačak	53	(2)
2012	→ Rabotnički (loan)	9	(1)
2014	Beroe	19	(2)
2015–2017	Vardar	56	(6)
2017–2019	Ferencváros	40	(5)
2019–2020	Hapoel Tel Aviv	21	(3)
2020–2021	AEK Larnaca	31	(1)
2021	Mariupol	6	(1)
2022	MTK Budapest	6	(0)
2022–2023	Pyunik	16	(1)
2023–2024	Ethnikos Achna	34	(1)
2024–2025	Struga	27	(1)
2025–	Pelister	31	(4)

International career^{‡}
2006	Macedonia U-17	2	(0)
2008–2009	Macedonia U-19	3	(0)
2009–2012	Macedonia U-21	21	(2)
2011–2022	North Macedonia	55	(1)
- * Club domestic league appearances and goals as of 25 May 2026 ‡ National team caps and goals as of 17 April 2023

Stefan Spirovski (Macedonian: Стефан Спировски, born 23 August 1990) is a Macedonian professional footballer who plays as a midfielder for Pelister and the North Macedonia national team.

== Career ==
Born in Bitola, SR Macedonia, he played for FK Pelister in the Macedonian First League between 2007 and 2009. He signed with Borac Čačak in the winter break of the 2009–10 season and has played regularly with Borac for the following two and a half seasons. At the end of the 2011–12 season, Borac ended unexpectedly relegated to the Serbian First League and in August 2012 he was loaned to Macedonian top flight side FK Rabotnički. In 2014 he joined Beroe. In January 2015 Vardar bought him from Beroe.

On 6 September 2019 signed to Hapoel Tel Aviv.

=== Ferencváros ===
On 16 June 2020, he became champion with Ferencváros by beating Budapest Honvéd FC at the Hidegkuti Nándor Stadion on the 30th match day of the 2019–20 Nemzeti Bajnokság I season.

=== Pyunik ===
On 16 June 2023, Pyunik confirmed the departure of Spirovski.

== International career ==
Spirovski was part of the Macedonia national under-21 football team. In the past he was part of the U-19 and U-17 teams as well.

On 10 August 2011, he made his debut for the Macedonian national team in a friendly match against Azerbaijan. As of April 2020, he has earned a total of 31 caps, scoring 1 goal.

== Career statistics ==
=== Club ===
As of matches played 20 April 2020

Club	Season	League		Cup		Europe		Total	
Club	Season	Apps	Goals	Apps	Goals	Apps	Goals	Apps	Goals
Pelister	2007–08	3	0	0	0	0	0	3	0
Pelister	2008–09	24	1	0	0	1	0	25	1
Pelister	2009–10	15	1	0	0	–	–	15	1
Pelister	Total	42	2	0	0	1	0	43	2
Borac Čačak	2009–10	12	1	0	0	–	–	12	1
Borac Čačak	2010–11	17	0	0	0	–	–	17	0
Borac Čačak	2011–12	15	0	5	0	–	–	20	0
Borac Čačak	2012–13	7	1	0	0	–	–	7	1
Borac Čačak	2013–14	2	0	2	0	–	–	4	0
Borac Čačak	Total	53	2	7	0	0	0	60	2
Rabotnički	2012–13	9	1	0	0	–	–	9	1
Rabotnički	Total	9	1	0	0	0	0	9	1
Beroe	2013–14	10	1	0	0	–	–	10	1
Beroe	2014–15	9	1	1	0	–	–	10	1
Beroe	Total	19	1	1	0	0	0	20	1
Vardar	2014–05	10	1	0	0	0	0	10	1
Vardar	2015–16	16	1	0	0	0	0	16	1
Vardar	2016–17	29	4	2	0	2	0	33	4
Vardar	2017–18	1	0	0	0	6	0	7	0
Vardar	Total	56	6	2	0	8	0	66	6
Ferencváros	2017–18	25	2	2	0	0	0	27	2
Ferencváros	2018–19	14	2	2	0	2	1	18	3
Ferencváros	2019–20	1	1	0	0	0	0	1	1
Ferencváros	Total	40	5	4	0	2	1	46	6
Hapoel Tel Aviv	2019–20	21	3	3	3	–	–	16	5
Hapoel Tel Aviv	Total	21	3	3	3	0	0	24	6
Career total		240	20	17	3	11	1	268	24

=== International goals ===
As of matches played 28 March 2017. Macedonia score listed first, score column indicates score after each Spirovski goal

International goals by date, venue, cap, opponent, score, result and competition
No.	Date	Venue	Cap	Opponent	Score	Result	Competition
1	28 March 2017	Philip II Arena, Skopje, North Macedonia	14	Belarus	1–0	3–0	Friendly

== Honours ==
=== Club ===
Borac Čačak

- Serbian Cup runner-up: 2011–12

Vardar

- Macedonian First League: 2014–15, 2015–16, 2016–17
- Macedonian Super Cup: 2015

=== Individual ===
- Macedonian player of the year: 2016–17
