= Boban Nikolov =

Macedonian footballer

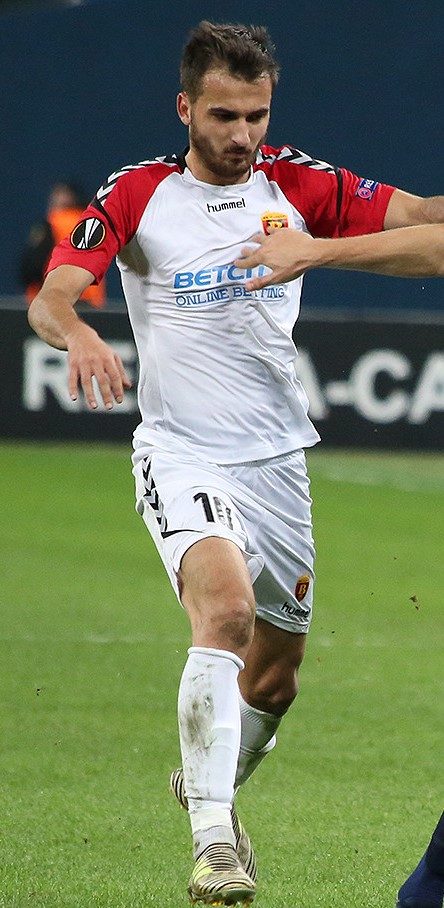
- Nikolov with Vardar in 2017

Personal information
- Full name: Boban Nikolov
- Date of birth: 28 July 1994 (age 32)
- Place of birth: Štip, Macedonia
- Height: 1.82 m (6 ft 0 in)
- Position: Midfielder

Team information
- Current team: Vardar
- Number: 8

Youth career
- –2010: Bregalnica Štip
- 2010–2012: Gheorghe Hagi Academy

Senior career*
| Years | Team | Apps | (Gls) |
| 2012–2015 | Viitorul Constanța | 38 | (2) |
| 2015–2018 | Vardar | 64 | (8) |
| 2018–2021 | Fehérvár | 106 | (7) |
| 2021 | Lecce | 15 | (0) |
| 2021–2022 | Sheriff Tiraspol | 22 | (4) |
| 2022–2023 | FCSB | 12 | (0) |
| 2023–2024 | Kisvárda | 26 | (2) |
| 2024–2025 | Borac Banja Luka | 42 | (0) |
| 2025–2026 | Farul Constanța | 6 | (0) |
| 2026– | Vardar | 14 | (3) |

International career^{‡}
| 2010 | Macedonia U17 | 3 | (1) |
| 2011–2012 | Macedonia U19 | 9 | (0) |
| 2013–2017 | Macedonia U21 | 22 | (1) |
| 2016–2022 | North Macedonia | 52 | (4) |
- * Club domestic league appearances and goals as of 9 May 2026 ‡ National team caps and goals as of 13 November 2026

Boban Nikolov (Macedonian: Бобан Николов; born 28 July 1994) is a Macedonian professional footballer who plays as a central midfielder for 1. MFL club Vardar.

== Club career ==
=== Viitorul Constanța ===
On 8 March 2013, Nikolov made his debut for Viitorul Constanța in the Liga I, in a 4–1 defeat to Gaz Metan Mediaș. On 19 May of the same year, he scored his first Liga I goal in a 5–2 win against Steaua București.

=== Lecce ===
On 19 January 2021 he was signed by Italian Serie B club Lecce.

=== Sheriff Tiraspol ===
Seven months later, on 20 August 2021, he signed for Moldovan National Division club Sheriff Tiraspol.

=== FCSB ===
On 17 September 2022, Nikolov signed for Liga I club FCSB on a one-year deal, with an option to extend for a further year.

== International career ==
On 29 May 2016, Nikolov made his international debut against Azerbaijan, and on 24 March 2017 he scored his first goal in the 2018 World Cup qualifier against Liechtenstein. He was also a regular in the U21 and U19 categories, where he also served as captain. As of April 2020, he has earned a total of 22 caps, scoring 2 goals. He represented the nation at UEFA Euro 2020, their first major tournament.

== Personal life ==
Boban Nikolov is an ethnic Aromanian, and he speaks Aromanian.

== Career statistics ==
=== Club ===
As of match played 7 December 2025

Appearances and goals by club, season and competition
| Club | Season | League | | | National cup (Note: Includes Cupa României, Magyar Kupa, Moldovan Cup, Bosnia and Herzegovina Cup) | | Europe | | Other | | Total | |
| Club | Season | Division | Apps | Goals | Apps | Goals | Apps | Goals | Apps | Goals | Apps | Goals |
|---|---|---|---|---|---|---|---|---|---|---|---|---|
| Viitorul Constanța | 2012–13 | Liga I | 5 | 1 | 0 | 0 | — | | — | | 5 | 1 |
| Viitorul Constanța | 2013–14 | Liga I | 18 | 0 | 2 | 0 | — | | — | | 20 | 0 |
| Viitorul Constanța | 2014–15 | Liga I | 15 | 1 | 1 | 0 | — | | — | | 16 | 1 |
| Viitorul Constanța | Total | | 38 | 2 | 3 | 0 | — | | — | | 41 | 2 |
| Vardar | 2015–16 | 1. MFL | 20 | 1 | 2 | 0 | 1 (Note: Appearance in UEFA Champions League) | 0 | 1 (Note: Appearance in Macedonian Super Cup) | 0 | 24 | 1 |
| Vardar | 2016–17 | 1. MFL | 34 | 7 | 3 | 2 | 1 | 0 | — | | 38 | 9 |
| Vardar | 2017–18 | 1. MFL | 10 | 0 | 0 | 0 | 12 (Note: Four appearances and three goals in UEFA Champions League, eight appearances in UEFA Europa League) | 3 | — | | 22 | 3 |
| Vardar | Total | | 64 | 8 | 5 | 2 | 14 | 3 | 1 | 0 | 84 | 13 |
| Fehérvár | 2017–18 | Nemzeti Bajnokság I | 13 | 3 | — | | — | | — | | 13 | 3 |
| Fehérvár | 2018–19 | Nemzeti Bajnokság I | 29 | 2 | 8 | 1 | 14 (Note: Eight appearances in UEFA Champions League, six appearances in UEFA Europa League) | 0 | — | | 51 | 3 |
| Fehérvár | 2019–20 | Nemzeti Bajnokság I | 22 | 1 | 4 | 2 | 3 (Note: Appearances in UEFA Europa League) | 0 | — | | 29 | 3 |
| Fehérvár | 2020–21 | Nemzeti Bajnokság I | 9 | 1 | 0 | 0 | 4 | 1 | — | | 13 | 2 |
| Fehérvár | Total | | 73 | 7 | 12 | 3 | 21 | 1 | — | | 106 | 11 |
| Lecce | 2020–21 | Serie B | 15 | 0 | 0 | 0 | — | | — | | 15 | 0 |
| Sheriff Tiraspol | 2021–22 | Moldovan National Division | 14 | 3 | 1 | 0 | 7 (Note: Five appearances and one goal in UEFA Champions League, two appearances in UEFA Europa League) | 1 | — | | 22 | 4 |
| FCSB | 2022–23 | Liga I | 11 | 0 | 2 | 0 | — | | — | | 13 | 0 |
| Kisvárda | 2023–24 | Nemzeti Bajnokság I | 22 | 1 | 4 | 1 | — | | — | | 26 | 2 |
| Borac Banja Luka | 2024–25 | Premier League of Bosnia and Herzegovina | 27 | 0 | 5 | 0 | 9 (Note: Appearances in UEFA Conference League) | 0 | 1 (Note: Appearance in Supercup of Bosnia and Herzegovina) | 0 | 42 | 0 |
| Farul Constanța | 2025–26 | Liga I | 6 | 0 | 1 | 0 | — | | — | | 7 | 0 |
| Vardar | 2025–26 | 1. MFL | 0 | 0 | 0 | 0 | — | | — | | 0 | 0 |
| Career total | | | 257 | 21 | 33 | 6 | 51 | 5 | 2 | 0 | 343 | 32 |

=== International ===
As of match played 20 November 2022

Appearances and goals by national team and year
| National team | Year | Apps | Goals |
|---|---|---|---|
North Macedonia
| North Macedonia | 2016 | 2 | 0 |
| North Macedonia | 2017 | 4 | 1 |
| North Macedonia | 2018 | 7 | 0 |
| North Macedonia | 2019 | 9 | 1 |
| North Macedonia | 2020 | 7 | 0 |
| North Macedonia | 2021 | 11 | 1 |
| North Macedonia | 2022 | 8 | 1 |
| Total | | 48 | 4 |

As of match played 5 June 2022. North Macedonia score listed first, score column indicates score after each Nikolov goal.

International goals by date, venue, cap, opponent, score, result and competition
| No. | Date | Venue | Cap | Opponent | Score | Result | Competition |
|---|---|---|---|---|---|---|---|
| 1 | 24 March 2017 | Rheinpark Stadion, Vaduz, Liechtenstein | 3 | Liechtenstein | 1–0 | 3–0 | 2018 FIFA World Cup qualification |
| 2 | 19 November 2019 | Toše Proeski Arena, Skopje, North Macedonia | 22 | Israel | 1–0 | 1–0 | UEFA Euro 2020 qualification |
| 3 | 8 October 2021 | Rheinpark Stadion, Vaduz, Liechtenstein | 37 | Liechtenstein | 3–0 | 4–0 | 2022 FIFA World Cup qualification |
| 4 | 5 June 2022 | Victoria Stadium, Gibraltar | 44 | Gibraltar | 2–0 | 2–0 | 2022–23 UEFA Nations League C |

== Honours ==
Vardar

- 1. MFL: 2015–16, 2016–17
- Macedonian Super Cup: 2015

Fehérvár

- Nemzeti Bajnokság I: 2017–18
- Magyar Kupa: 2018–19

Sheriff Tiraspol

- Divizia Națională: 2021–22
- Moldovan Cup: 2021–22

Borac Banja Luka

- Bosnian Supercup runner-up: 2024
