= Damir Kojašević =

Montenegrin footballer

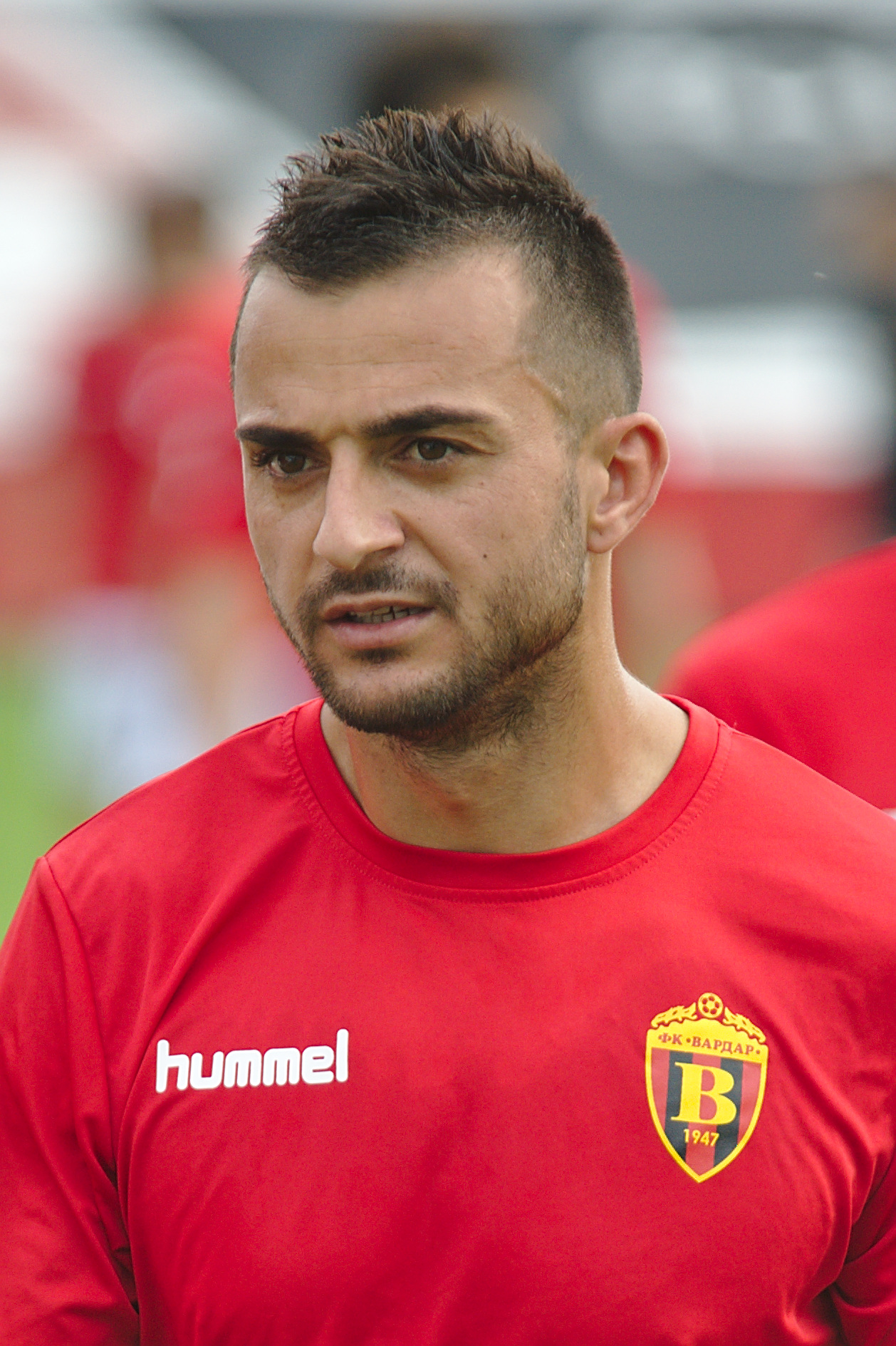
- Kojašević with Vardar in 2017

Personal information
- Date of birth: 3 June 1987 (age 39)
- Place of birth: Titograd, SFR Yugoslavia
- Height: 1.72 m (5 ft 8 in)
- Position: Winger

Team information
- Current team: Rudar Pljevlja
- Number: 10

Senior career*
Years	Team	Apps	(Gls)
2007–2008	Dečić	41	(4)
2008–2009	Jagiellonia Białystok	23	(1)
2009	→ Górnik Łęczna (loan)	7	(0)
2009	→ Górnik Łęczna II (loan)	1	(0)
2010	Zeta	12	(2)
2010–2012	Sarajevo	40	(9)
2012	Budućnost Podgorica	15	(2)
2012–2015	Astana	61	(12)
2015	→ Lokomotiv Tashkent (loan)	8	(1)
2015	Mladost Podgorica	14	(7)
2016–2017	Vardar	40	(13)
2017–2018	Vojvodina	14	(4)
2018	Shakhter Karagandy	26	(8)
2019	Radnički Niš	10	(2)
2019–2020	Sutjeska Nikšić	31	(9)
2021	Feronikeli	6	(1)
2021	Dečić	13	(1)
2022	Iskra Danilovgrad	31	(3)
2023	Jezero	12	(1)
2023	Arsenal Tivat	7	(0)
2024	Fushë Kosova	13	(1)
2024–	Rudar Pljevlja	23	(1)

International career
2016–2019	Montenegro	9	(1)
- * Club domestic league appearances and goals as of 3 April 2025

Damir Kojašević (Montenegrin Cyrillic: Дамир Којашевић; born 3 June 1987) is a Montenegrin professional footballer who plays as a winger for Rudar Pljevlja.

While playing as a professional in Kazakhstan, Talgat Baysufinov called him "the little scoundrel", referring to his playing style on the field.

== Club career ==
=== Early career ===
Kojašević signed his first professional contract with Montenegrin club Dečić at the age of 16. At the age of 18, he completed his first international transfer to Polish team Jagiellonia Białystok in 2008. At the age of 19, he was named the best foreign player in the Ekstraklasa. He left after a season due to a disagreement with the coach. He then returned to Montenegro and joined Zeta, with whom he played for three months.

=== Sarajevo ===
In 2010, Kojašević joined Bosnian team Sarajevo after being scouted by the club president at the time, Zijad Blekić. Over the course of two seasons with Sarajevo, he was considered to be one of the best players in the Premijer Liga. After the club told him they could not afford to pay his salary, Kojašević voluntarily terminated his contract. He subsequently joined Budućnost in a free transfer in January 2012, but played for them for only three months.

=== Astana ===
After only a brief period with Budućnost, Kojašević joined Kazakh side FC Astana in the spring of 2012. During his time with Astana, he enjoyed clubbing after games. In February 2015, Kojašević moved from Astana to Lokomotiv Tashkent on loan.

=== Mladost Podgorica ===
In August 2015, Kojašević turned down clubs from other countries to join Mladost Podgorica, citing family reasons. At Mladost his coach was Nikola Rakojević. In November 2015 he suffered a calf injury. Although he only spent a half-season at Mladost, Kojašević contributed to Mladost winning the league that season with seven goals.

=== Vardar ===
In December 2015, Kojašević signed with Vardar. He contributed in Vardar's first ever successful qualifying campaign to the 2017–18 UEFA Europa League, and played in their historic upset of heavily favored Fenerbahçe in front of an audience of 45,000 at the Şükrü Saracoğlu Stadium on 24 August 2017. Despite Vardar entering the Europa League group stage for the first time, Kojašević left the team before the group stage allegedly due to financial issues with club owner Sergey Samsonenko. Vardar ended up without a single win in Europa League Group L that season.

=== Vojvodina ===
In September 2017, Kojašević signed a one-year contract with Serbian club Vojvodina. On 29 September 2017, he scored two goals against Mladost Lučani. On 28 October 2017, he scored an olympic goal in a 3–0 win against Rad. On 3 December 2017, Kojašević scored a goal in a 1–1 tie against Partizan at their stadium in snowy conditions. In the half-season he played for Vojvodina, he scored four goals over the course of 14 matches. He was a teammate with Dušan Jovančić. Although he allegedly agreed to remain in Vojvodina for the remainder of the season, he terminated his contract in late January 2018.

=== Shakhter Karagandy ===
On 12 February 2018, Shakhter Karagandy announced the signing of Kojašević. At the time he joined, the team was coached by Uladzimir Zhuravel, with whom Kojašević worked well and got playing time. However, the team's record under Zhuravel experienced a period of losses in addition to Zhuravel's health problems. Later in 2018 Zhuravel was replaced by Nikolay Kostov, with whom Kojašević also saw playing time in addition to a significantly improved record during the season.

In August 2018, Kojašević went to the coal mine in Karaganda with the rest of the team. Although he was initially scared, the mine left a strong impression with him, as he had never gone down a mine before.

=== Radnički Niš ===
On 16 January 2019, Kojašević joined Serbian club Radnički Niš. Coach Nenad Lalatović had insisted on Kojašević's signing, referring to him as one of the best playmakers in the Serbian SuperLiga. On 29 January 2019, he scored his first goal for Radnički Niš in a 3-0 friendly win against Russian club Avangard. On 7 April 2019, he scored two goals in a 5–1 win against OFK Bačka.

=== Sutjeska Nikšić ===
On 14 June 2019, Kojašević signed a one-year contract with Montenegrin club Sutjeska Nikšić. On 10 July 2019, he scored a goal in a 1–1 tie against Slovan Bratislava in the first leg of the first qualifying round for the 2019–20 UEFA Champions League. On 6 August 2019, he scored from a free kick in a 1–2 loss against Linfield in the first leg of the third qualifying round for the 2019–20 UEFA Europa League.

== International career ==
Kojašević was called up to the senior Montenegro squad for a friendly against Turkey in June 2016. However, he did not make his debut until substituting Marko Vešović in a match against Romania on 4 September 2016. Less than 10 minutes after coming on the field, Kojašević made an assist for teammate Stevan Jovetić, whose goal tied the game 1-1. On 27 March 2017, he made another assist for teammate Stefan Mugoša in his goal against Poland, although Montenegro ended up losing 1–2. As of September 2020, he has earned a total of 9 caps, scoring 1 goal.

== Career statistics ==
Appearances and goals by club, season and competition
Club	Season	League			National cup		Continental		Other		Total	
Club	Season	Division	Apps	Goals	Apps	Goals	Apps	Goals	Apps	Goals	Apps	Goals
Dečić	2006–07	Montenegrin First League	10	0			—		1 (Note: Appearance in Relegation play-offs)	1	11	1
Dečić	2007–08	Montenegrin First League	31	4			—		—		31	4
Dečić	Total		41	4			—		1	1	42	5
Jagiellonia Białystok	2008–09	Ekstraklasa	23	1	2	0	—		5 (Note: Appearances in Ekstraklasa Cup)	1	30	2
Górnik Łęczna (loan)	2009–10	I liga	7	0	1	0	—		—		8	0
Górnik Łęczna II (loan)	2009–10	III liga	1	0	—		—		—		1	0
Zeta	2009–10	Montenegrin First League	12	2	0	0	0	0	—		12	2
Zeta	2010–11	Montenegrin First League	0	0	0	0	2	0	—		2	0
Zeta	Total		12	2	0	0	2	0	—		14	2
Sarajevo	2010–11	Bosnian Premier League	26	4	3	0	—		—		29	4
Sarajevo	2011–12	Bosnian Premier League	14	5	4	1	4	0	—		22	6
Sarajevo	Total		40	9	7	1	4	0	—		51	10
Budućnost Podgorica	2011–12	Montenegrin First League	15	2	0	0	0	0	—		15	2
Astana	2012	Kazakhstan Premier League	11	2	5	2	—		—		16	4
Astana	2013	Kazakhstan Premier League	29	6	2	1	2	0	1 (Note: Appearance in Kazakhstan Super Cup)	0	34	7
Astana	2014	Kazakhstan Premier League	21	4	3	2	3	0	—		27	6
Astana	Total		61	12	10	5	5	0	1	0	77	17
Lokomotiv Tashkent (loan)	2015	Uzbek League	8	1	2	0	4	2	0	0	14	3
Mladost Podgorica	2015–16	Montenegrin First League	14	7	1	0	—		—		15	7
Vardar	2015–16	Macedonian First League	13	3	0	0	—		—		13	3
Vardar	2016–17	Macedonian First League	26	9	2	0	2	0	—		30	9
Vardar	2017–18	Macedonian First League	1	1	0	0	5	0	—		6	1
Vardar	Total		40	13	2	0	7	0	—		49	13
Vojvodina	2017–18	Serbian SuperLiga	14	4	1	1	0	0	—		15	5
Shakhter Karagandy	2018	Kazakhstan Premier League	26	8	3	1	—		—		29	9
Radnički Niš	2018–19	Serbian SuperLiga	10	2	2	0	0	0	—		12	2
Sutjeska Nikšić	2019–20	Montenegrin First League	24	8	4	0	6	2	—		34	10
Sutjeska Nikšić	2020–21	Montenegrin First League	7	1	0	0	1	0	—		8	1
Sutjeska Nikšić	Total		31	9	4	0	7	2	—		42	11
Career total			343	74	35	8	29	4	7	2	414	88

=== International goals ===
Scores and results list Montenegro's goal tally first.

No	Date	Venue	Opponent	Score	Result	Competition
1	11 November 2016	Vazgen Sargsyan Republican Stadium, Yerevan, Armenia	Armenia	1–0	2–3	2018 FIFA World Cup qualification

== Honours ==
Budućnost Podgorica

- Montenegrin First League: 2011–12

Astana

- Kazakhstan Premier League: 2014
- Kazakhstan Cup: 2012

Vardar

- Macedonian First League: 2015–16, 2016–17
