= Emran Ramadani =

Association football player

Personal information
- Full name: Emran Ramadani; Емран Рамадани
- Date of birth: 29 January 1992 (age 34)
- Place of birth: Tetovo, Macedonia
- Height: 1.74 m (5 ft 8 1/2 in)
- Position: Winger

Team information
- Current team: Gostivari
- Number: 22

Youth career
- –2010: Teteks

Senior career*
Years	Team	Apps	(Gls)
2009–2010	Teteks	21	(4)
2010–2011	Hajduk Kula	11	(0)
2011	Shkëndija	6	(0)
2012–2013	Korabi	32	(14)
2013–2017	Renova	119	(19)
2018	Partizani Tirana	6	(1)
2018–2019	Renova	31	(11)
2019–2020	Struga	20	(0)
2020–2022	Renova	60	(2)
2022–2024	Gostivari	7	(0)
2024	Arsimi		
- * Club domestic league appearances and goals as of 19 October 2023

Emran Ramadani (Macedonian: Емран Рамадани, born 29 January 1992) is a Macedonian footballer playing with Gostivari in the Macedonian First Football League.

== Club career ==
Born in Tetovo, coming from FK Teteks, Emran Ramadani joined Serbian club FK Hajduk Kula and played eleven games with them in the 2010–11 Serbian SuperLiga.

In summer 2011 he returned to Macedonia and joined Macedonian First League side FK Shkëndija playing with them the first half of the 2011–12 season and winning the 2011 Macedonian Super Cup title. Then he played a year and a half with second-tier side FK Korabi, before returning to Macedonian First League this time by joining FK Renova in summer 2013. He played with Renova in both matches of the first round of the 2015–16 UEFA Europa League.

After playing with Renova 4 1/2 seasons, he moved to Albanian side FK Partizani Tirana during winter-break of the 2017–18 season.

== Honours ==
Shkëndija

- Macedonian Super Cup: 2011
