= Haris Fakić =

Macedonian footballer

Personal information
- Date of birth: 3 March 1982 (age 44)
- Place of birth: Skopje, SR Macedonia, SFR Yugoslavia
- Height: 1.85 m (6 ft 1 in)
- Position: Defender

Team information
- Current team: Dinamo City (sporting director)

Senior career*
Years	Team	Apps	(Gls)
2001–2002	Sloga Jugomagnat	14	(0)
2003–2004	OFK Beograd		
2004–2005	Cementarnica 55	7	(0)
2005–2007	Bregalnica Štip		
2007–2008	PoPa		
2008	Metalurg Skopje	8	(0)
2009–2010	Shkëndija		

International career
2001–2002	Macedonia U21		
- * Club domestic league appearances and goals

Haris Fakić (Macedonian: Харис Факиќ, born 3 March 1982) is a Macedonian retired footballer who played as a defender.

== Club career ==
Born in Skopje, he played from 2001 to 2002 Sloga Jugomagnat Skopje where he won the championship and the national cup. As early as next season's first transfer of the Serbian OFK Belgrade where he stayed only one season and won the award for the third best defender on the team OFK Belgrade. followed by the transfer of the team FC Cementarnica 55 where he won the national cup. where he won the national cup Beside various Macedonian clubs that he represented, he played in Serbia in OFK Beograd, and in Finland in Porin Palloilijat better known simply as FC PoPa. in 2015, he became sporting director of FC Skenderbeu Korce.

== International career ==
Despite having Bosnian roots, Haris was selected several times to represent the Macedonia national under-21 team.
