= Nemanja Mijušković =

Montenegrin footballer

Personal information
- Date of birth: 4 March 1992 (age 34)
- Place of birth: Podgorica, SFR Yugoslavia
- Height: 1.85 m (6 ft 1 in)
- Position: Centre-back

Team information
- Current team: Odra Opole
- Number: 35

Youth career
- –2008: Budućnost Podgorica
- 2008–2009: OFK Beograd
- 2009–2010: Jedinstvo Ub

Senior career*
Years	Team	Apps	(Gls)
2009–2010	OFK Beograd	0	(0)
2010–2012	Dynamo Moscow	0	(0)
2011–2012	→ Amkar Perm (loan)	0	(0)
2012–2013	FK Sarajevo	2	(0)
2013–2015	Rudar Pljevlja	59	(4)
2015–2017	FK Vardar	26	(2)
2017	Taraz	27	(1)
2018	Tosno	2	(0)
2019	Hermannstadt	30	(0)
2019–2024	Miedź Legnica	150	(21)
2025–2026	Wisła Płock	43	(1)
2026–	Odra Opole	0	(0)

International career
2008	Montenegro U17	2	(0)
2010–2011	Montenegro U19	4	(0)
2011	Montenegro U21	2	(0)
2016–2018	Montenegro	4	(0)
- * Club domestic league appearances and goals as of 18:21, 29 May 2026 (UTC)

Nemanja Mijušković (Serbian Cyrillic: Немања Мијушковић, pronounced [němaɲa mǐjuʃkoʋitɕ, - mijǔː-]; born 4 March 1992) is a Montenegrin professional footballer who plays as a centre-back for I liga club Odra Opole.

== Club career ==
Born in Podgorica, Mijušković started his career with local side Budućnost Podgorica, although he would never make an appearance for the first team. He moved to Serbia to join the youth team of OFK Beograd in 2008. Mijušjović would be signed to the senior team in 2009, although he would never play in a first team match. In February 2010 he was part of Jedinstvo Ub squad at the 2010 Torneo di Viareggio. By the end of the 2009–10 winter break, Russian side Dynamo Moscow bought Mijušković from OFK Beograd. He stayed in Russia until the summer of 2012, appearing for the reserve team of Dynamo Moscow and going on loan to the reserve team of Amkar Perm. For the 2012–13 season, Mijušković moved to FK Sarajevo in the Premier League of Bosnia and Herzegovina, where he would make his senior debut. In the summer of 2013 he returned to Montenegro and joined with Rudar Pljevlja, playing with the club for two seasons in the Montenegrin First League. He would make more than 50 appearances and score four times for Rudar. In the summer of 2015, he left Montenegro to sign with Macedonian side FK Vardar. He left the club at the end of 2016.

On 1 January 2018, he signed a two-year contract with the Russian Premier League club FC Tosno.

== International career ==
Mijušković made his debut for Montenegro in a May 2016 friendly match against Turkey and has, as of September 2020, earned a total of 4 caps, scoring no goals.

== Career statistics ==
=== Club ===
As of match played 23 May 2026

Appearances and goals by club, season and competition
Club	Season	League			National cup (Note: Includes Macedonian Cup, Cupa României, Polish Cup)		Continental		Other		Total	
Club	Season	Division	Apps	Goals	Apps	Goals	Apps	Goals	Apps	Goals	Apps	Goals
OFK Beograd	2009–10	Serbian SuperLiga	0	0	0	0	—		—		0	0
Dynamo Moscow	2010	Russian Premier League	0	0	0	0	—		—		0	0
Dynamo Moscow	2011–12	Russian Premier League	0	0	0	0	—		—		0	0
Dynamo Moscow	Total		0	0	0	0	0	0	0	0	0	0
Amkar Perm (loan)	2011–12	Russian Premier League	0	0	0	0	—		—		0	0
FK Sarajevo	2012–13	Bosnian Premier League	2	0	0	0	0	0	—		2	0
Rudar Pljevlja	2013–14	Montenegrin First League	30	0	0	0	1 (Note: Appearance(s) in UEFA Europa League)	0	—		31	0
Rudar Pljevlja	2014–15	Montenegrin First League	29	4	0	0	—		—		29	4
Rudar Pljevlja	Total		59	4	0	0	1	0	0	0	60	4
FK Vardar	2015–16	Macedonian First League	22	1	2	1	2 (Note: Appearance in UEFA Champions League)	0	1 (Note: Appearance in Macedonian Football Supercup)	0	27	2
FK Vardar	2016–17	Macedonian First League	4	1	0	0	1	0	—		5	1
FK Vardar	Total		26	2	2	1	3	0	1	0	32	3
Taraz	2017	Kazakhstan Premier League	27	1	0	0	—		—		27	1
Tosno	2017–18	Russian Premier League	2	0	0	0	—		—		2	0
Hermannstadt	2018–19	Liga I	30	0	2	0	—		—		32	0
Miedź Legnica	2019–20	I liga	28	2	2	0	—		1 (Note: Appearance(s) in I liga promotion play-offs)	0	31	2
Miedź Legnica	2020–21	I liga	22	4	1	0	—		—		23	4
Miedź Legnica	2021–22	I liga	32	6	2	1	—		—		34	7
Miedź Legnica	2022–23	Ekstraklasa	28	2	0	0	—		—		28	2
Miedź Legnica	2023–24	I liga	34	6	1	0	—		—		35	6
Miedź Legnica	2024–25	I liga	5	1	0	0	—		—		5	1
Miedź Legnica	Total		149	21	6	1	—		1	0	156	22
Wisła Płock	2024–25	I liga	13	1	—		—		2	0	15	1
Wisła Płock	2025–26	Ekstraklasa	28	0	1	0	—		—		29	0
Wisła Płock	Total		41	1	1	0	—		2	0	44	1
Odra Opole	2026–27	I liga	0	0	0	0	—		—		0	0
Career total			336	29	11	2	4	0	4	0	355	31

=== International ===
Appearances and goals by national team and year
National team	Year	Apps	Goals
Montenegro
Montenegro	2016	2	0
Montenegro	2017	1	0
Montenegro	2018	1	0
Total		4	0

== Honours ==
Rudar Pljevlja

- Montenegrin First League: 2014–15

Vardar

- Macedonian First League: 2015–16, 2016–17
- Macedonian Football Supercup: 2015

Tosno

- Russian Cup: 2017–18

Miedź Legnica

- I liga: 2021–22
