= Goran Popov =

Macedonian footballer (born 1984)

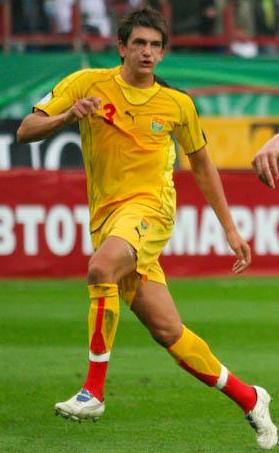

Personal information
- Full name: Goran Popov
- Date of birth: 2 October 1984 (age 42)
- Place of birth: Strumica, SFR Yugoslavia
- Height: 1.89 m (6 ft 2 in)
- Positions: Left-back; left midfielder

Senior career*
Years	Team	Apps	(Gls)
2002–2004	Belasica	6	(0)
2003	→ Proodeftiki (loan)	0	(0)
2004	→ AEK Athens (loan)	8	(0)
2004	Red Star Belgrade	0	(0)
2004–2005	→ Odra Wodzisław (loan)	11	(0)
2005–2008	Egaleo	45	(1)
2007–2008	→ Levadiakos (loan)	20	(0)
2008–2010	Heerenveen	51	(2)
2010–2014	Dynamo Kyiv	32	(2)
2012–2014	→ West Bromwich Albion (loan)	18	(0)
2014–2017	Vardar	43	(3)
2017	Doxa Katokopias	0	(0)
2017–2019	Vardar	19	(3)

International career
2002	Macedonia U19	5	(2)
	Macedonia U21	10	(2)
2004–2014	Macedonia	46	(2)
- * Club domestic league appearances and goals

Goran Popov (Macedonian: Горан Попов; born 2 October 1984) is a Macedonian former professional footballer who played as a defender.

Popov started his career with local side Belasica and moved to Greece with Proodeftiki and AEK Athens. He signed for Red Star Belgrade in 2004 but injuries prevented him from making an impact and he returned to Greek football with Egaleo after a short loan spell in Poland with Odra Wodzisław. Egaleo were relegated in 2007 and Popov joined Levadiakos before moving to Dutch club Heerenveen in July 2008. At Heerenveen he finally found some success and won the KNVB Cup in 2009 scoring in the final against FC Twente. After good form in European competitions Popov signed for Ukrainian side Dynamo Kyiv.

== Club career ==
Popov was started his football career in 2002 with local club Belasica making six appearances as the side finished second in the First Macedonian Football League. In 2002 he was loaned to Greek side Proodeftiki. On 9 January 2004 he was loaned to another Greek club, AEK Athens for a fee of €50,000 and a buy-out option. His time at Athens was short and after eight matches he left for Red Star Belgrade where he made his debut away at PSV Eindhoven in the UEFA Champions League as Red Star lost 5–0. Injuries prevented him from making at impact with Red Star and he joined Polish side Odra Wodzisław on loan. At the end of the 2004–05 season Popov returned to Greek football with Egaleo spending two seasons there and then one season with Levadiakos. In 2008, he made the move to Dutch football with Heerenveen where he won the KNVB Cup in 2009 and impressed enough in European football to earn a move to Ukrainian giants Dynamo Kyiv in June 2010.

On 10 August 2012, Popov initially signed for English Premier League side Stoke City on a season long loan deal, but the move fell through after he failed to be granted a UK work permit. On deadline day, Popov received a UK work permit and he signed instead on a season-long loan for West Bromwich Albion. After Artim Šakiri, Goran Popov is the second Macedonian football player who has ever played at West Bromwich Albion.

On 3 February 2013, Popov was dismissed by referee Mark Clattenburg for allegedly spitting at fullback Kyle Walker, in a game that ended 1–0 to Tottenham Hotspur.

On 9 July 2013, Popov signed a one-year loan deal to return to West Bromwich Albion.

On 18 September, Popov signed a three-year contract with Vardar for undisclosed fee. At the end of the 2018–19 season, Popov's contract with Vardar expired and he retired from football.

== International career ==
Goran Popov has been part of the Macedonian U19 and U21 teams before making his debut senior for the Macedonian national team in June 2004 in a friendly match against Estonia. He has earned a total of 46 caps, scoring 2 goals and his final international was a May 2014 friendly against Cameroon.

In addition to Macedonian, he also holds Bulgarian citizenship.

=== International goals ===
#	Date	Venue	Opponent	Score	Result	Competition
1.	30 May 2004	A. Le Coq Arena, Tallinn, Estonia	Estonia	2–4	Win	Friendly
2.	19 November 2008	Estadi Comunal d'Aixovall, Andorra la Vella, Andorra	Montenegro	2–1	Lost	Friendly
Correct as of 13 January 2013

== Career statistics ==
=== Club ===
Statistics accurate as of match played 4 January 2014

Club	Season	League			FA Cup		League Cup		Europe		Other^{[A]}		Total	
Club	Season	Division	Apps	Goals	Apps	Goals	Apps	Goals	Apps	Goals	Apps	Goals	Apps	Goals
Belasica	2002–03	1. MFL	6	0	0	0	0	0	1	0	–		7	0
AEK Athens	2003–04	Alpha Ethniki	8	0	0	0	0	0	0	0	–		8	0
Red Star Belgrade	2004–05	First League	0	0	0	0	0	0	3	0	–		3	0
Odra Wodzisław (loan)	2004–05	Ekstraklasa	11	0	0	0	0	0	–		–		11	0
Egaleo	2005–06	Alpha Ethniki	19	0	0	0	0	0	–		–		19	0
Egaleo	2006–07	Super League Greece	26	1	0	0	0	0	–		–		26	1
Egaleo	Total		45	1	0	0	0	0	0	0	0	0	45	1
Levadiakos (loan)	2007–08	Super League Greece	20	0	0	0	0	0	–		–		20	0
Heerenveen	2008–09	Eredivisie	24	1	5	2	0	0	4	0	–		33	3
Heerenveen	2009–10	Eredivisie	27	1	3	1	0	0	8	0	1	0	39	2
Heerenveen	Total		51	2	8	3	0	0	12	0	1	0	72	5
Dynamo Kyiv	2010–11	Ukrainian Premier League	15	1	3	0	0	0	11	0	–		29	1
Dynamo Kyiv	2011–12	Ukrainian Premier League	16	1	1	0	0	0	6	0	1	0	24	1
Dynamo Kyiv	2012–13	Ukrainian Premier League	1	0	0	0	0	0	2	0	1	0	4	0
Dynamo Kyiv	Total		32	2	4	0	0	0	19	0	2	0	57	2
West Bromwich Albion (loan)	2012–13	Premier League	12	0	1	0	0	0	–		–		13	0
West Bromwich Albion (loan)	2013–14	Premier League	2	0	1	0	2	0	–		–		5	0
West Bromwich Albion (loan)	Total		14	0	2	0	2	0	0	0	0	0	18	0
Career total			187	5	14	3	2	0	35	0	3	0	241	8

A. The "Other" column constitutes appearances and goals in the Johan Cruijff-schaal XIV and Ukrainian Super Cup.

=== International ===
As of August 2012

Macedonia national team
Year	Apps	Goals
2004	2	1
2005	6	0
2006	1	0
2007	5	0
2008	5	1
2009	10	0
2010	6	0
2011	6	0
2012	3	0
2014	2	0
Total	46	2

== Personal life ==
He is the younger brother of Robert Popov who is also a football player.

== Honours ==
sc Heerenveen

- KNVB Cup: 2008–09

Dynamo Kyiv

- Ukrainian Super Cup: 2011

Vardar

- Macedonian First Football League: 2014–15, 2015–16, 2016–17
- Macedonian Supercup: 2015
