= Filip Ivanovski =

Macedonian footballer

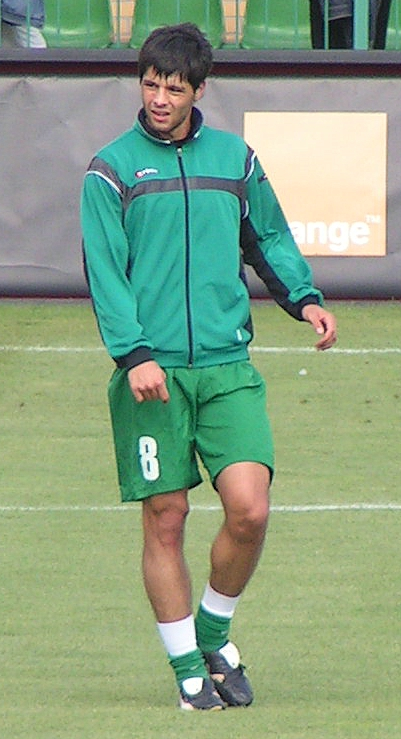

Personal information
- Full name: Filip Ivanovski; Филип Ивановски
- Date of birth: 1 May 1985 (age 41)
- Place of birth: Skopje, SFR Yugoslavia
- Height: 1.86 m (6 ft 1 in)
- Position: Striker

Youth career
- Vardar
- Rabotnichki

Senior career*
Years	Team	Apps	(Gls)
2002–2003	Rabotnički	9	(0)
2004	Alumina		
2005–2006	Makedonija	48	(32)
2007–2008	Dyskobolia Grodzisk	33	(7)
2008–2010	Polonia Warsaw	44	(14)
2010–2011	Ethnikos Achnas	14	(1)
2011–2012	Vardar	32	(24)
2012–2013	Astana	21	(3)
2014–2016	Vardar	61	(21)
2016–2017	Rabotnički	34	(7)
2017–2018	Javor Ivanjica	18	(3)
2018	RoPS	16	(6)
2018	Belasica	12	(4)
2019–2020	KPV	4	(0)

International career
2009–2012	Macedonia	8	(1)
- * Club domestic league appearances and goals

Filip Ivanovski (Macedonian: Филип Ивановски, born 1 May 1985) is a Macedonian former professional footballer who played as a striker.

== Club career ==
Ivanovski made his name in Poland with Dyskobolia Grodzisk and on 11 March 2008, he scored one goal in a match between Foreign Stars of Orange Ekstraklasa and the Poland national football team. His debut for Polonia came on 16 August 2008 in a 0–2 loss to Wisła Kraków. He scored his first goal for the club in the next outing, in the 85th minute of a 2–1 win over ŁKS Łódź on 23 August.

Ivanovski's contract with Polonia expired in the summer of 2010 and he decided to continue his career in Cyprus by signing a 1-year deal with an option for an additional year with Ethnikos Achnas.

After Ethnikos Achnas Ivanovski travelled to FK Vardar in Macedonia for a season, scoring 24 goals in 32 games and just shortly to make a transfer to the squad of FC Astana playing in Kazakhstan Premier League where he also spent just one season. Then Ivanoski returned to his old youth club FK Vardar between 2014 and 2016. After that he returned to another old youth club of his career in Macedonia, FK Rabotnichki.

On 7 July 2017, Ivanovski signed for Javor Ivanjica in the Serbian SuperLiga. On 4 April 2018, Ivanovski signed for Finnish club RoPS until July 2018, with an option to extend the deal until the end of the year.

== International career ==
He made his senior debut for Macedonia in a June 2009 FIFA World Cup qualification match against Iceland in which he immediately scored a goal and has earned a total of 8 caps, scoring 1 goal. His final international was a May 2012 friendly match against Angola.

=== International goals ===
Filip Ivanovski: International Goals
#	Date	Venue	Opponent	Score	Result	Competition
1	10 June 2009	Skopje, Macedonia	Iceland	2–0	Win	2010 FIFA World Cup qualification

== Honours ==
Makedonija

- Macedonian Football Cup: 2005–06

Dyskobolia Grodzisk

- Polish Cup: 2006–07
- Ekstraklasa Cup: 2006–07, 2007–08

Astana

- Kazakhstan Cup: 2012

Vardar

- Macedonian First Football League: 2011–12, 2014–15, 2015–16
- Macedonian Football Supercup: 2015

Individual

- First Macedonian Football League top scorer: 2011–12
