= Hovhannes Hambardzumyan =

Armenian footballer

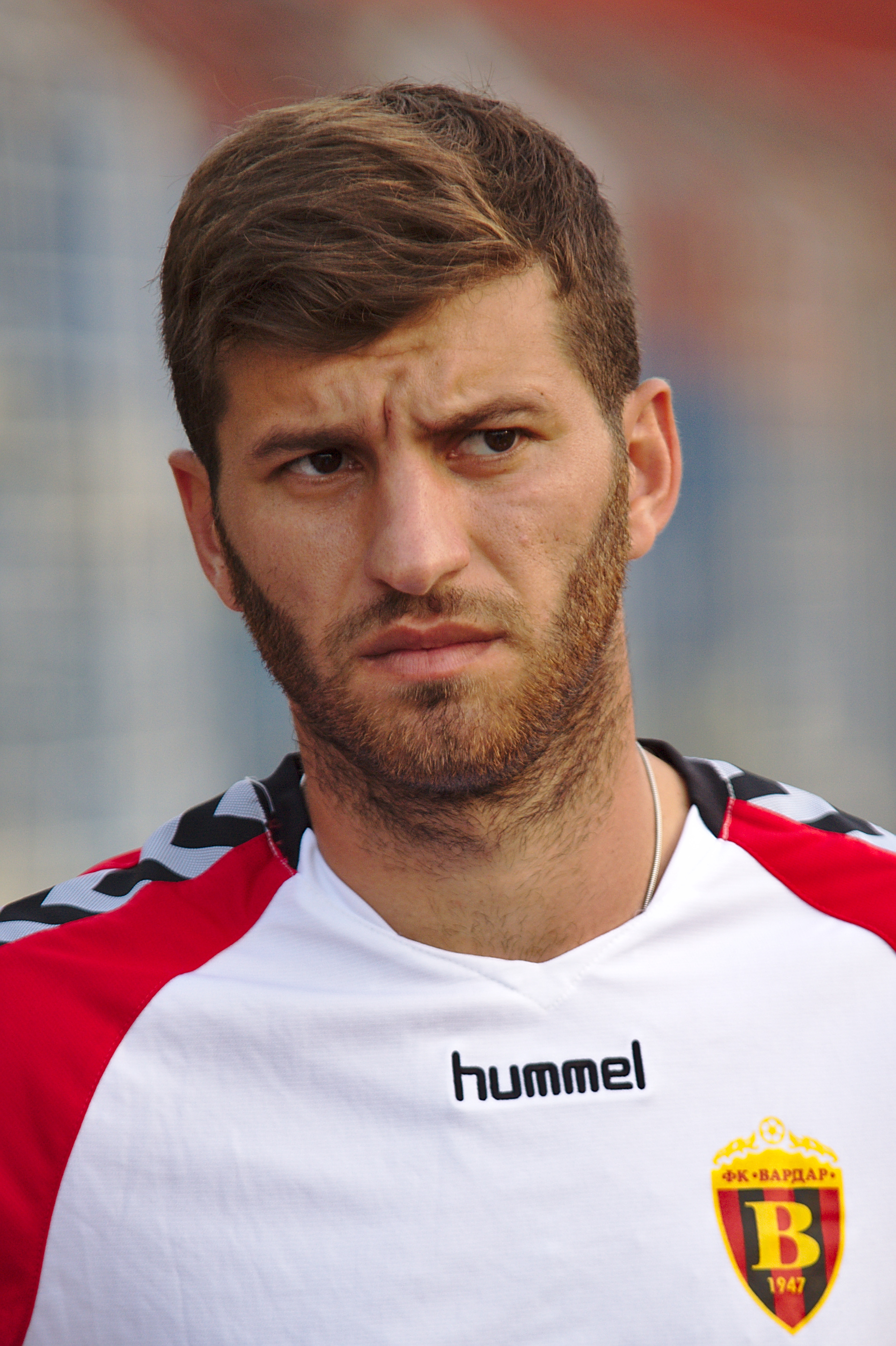
- Hambardzumyan with Vardar in 2017

Personal information
- Full name: Hovhannes Sarkisovich Hambardzumyan
- Date of birth: 4 October 1990 (age 36)
- Place of birth: Yerevan, Armenian SSR, Soviet Union
- Height: 1.81 m (5 ft 11 in)
- Position: Right-back

Team information
- Current team: Noah
- Number: 19

Youth career
- 2007–2009: Banants Yerevan

Senior career*
Years	Team	Apps	(Gls)
2008–2014	Banants Yerevan	130	(14)
2014–2018	Vardar	79	(13)
2018–2020	Enosis Neon Paralimni	42	(4)
2020–2023	Anorthosis Famgusta	64	(6)
2023–	Noah	64	(6)

International career^{‡}
2008–2009	Armenia U19	7	(0)
2009–2012	Armenia U21	9	(1)
2010–	Armenia	53	(4)
- * Club domestic league appearances and goals as of 18 June 2026 ‡ National team caps and goals as of 6 June 2025

Hovhannes Hambardzumyan (Armenian: Հովհաննես Համբարձումյան; born 4 October 1990) is an Armenian professional footballer who plays as a right-back. for Noah and the Armenia national team.

== Club career ==
Hambardzumyan was a student of the football school Banants Yerevan, becoming one of the children of the club. Initially he played in the first division for Banants-2. In the 2008 season, he had one match for Banants in the Armenian Premier League. His debut took place on 23 August in a game against the guest Ararat Yerevan and ended with a 1–0 defeat of Banants. Hambardzumyan came in on the 84th minute of the match, replacing Seven Muradyan. As of next season, Hambardzumyan was regularly exposed to the participation for matches like the Armenian Premier League and the Armenian Cup. Banants became the finalists of the Armenian Cup for three seasons in 2008, 2009 and 2010. In the 2010 season, by participating in three events held under the regulation of the Football Federation of Armenia, Banants came in second in the Premier League, Cup and Armenian Supercup.

On 18 June 2014, Hambardzumyan signed a two-year contract with Macedonian side FK Vardar. At the end of the 2014–15 season, Hambardzumyan was voted player of the year in Macedonia. In July 2015, Hambardzumyan started both UEFA Champions League qualification matches against APOEL FC.

In August 2023, he returned to his homeland, signing a contract with Noah.

== International career ==
With the introduction of the core team at the club, Hambardzumyan was invited to the Armenia U-19 youth team, for which he played for a little more than two years seven matches. This was followed by an invitation already from the Armenia U21 junior coaching department. He debuted for the second team on 4 September 2009 against peers from Switzerland U21. Hambardzumyan left to the field after the break in the second half, replacing Artak Yedigaryan. The Armenian team was defeated 3–1. The second match was played against the Estonia U21 team on 20 May next year. However, in this match, Hambardzumyan was released only in the 88th minute of the game, coming out on the field in place of Edgar Malakyan. The final score was 3–2 in favor of the youth national team of Estonia. Only in the third match of Hambardzumyan was he entrusted a place in the first team. The junior team played sensationally in the match and defeated Montenegro U-21 4–1. The entire team, including Hambardzumyan, were awarded high marks.

Hambardzumyan debuted in the Armenia national football team after he got called for the UEFA Euro 2012 qualifying matches. The first game of this series took place against Ireland, with Hambardzumyan coming in as substitute in the 71st minute for Artak Yedigaryan. But the debut match for the national team held on 11 August, against the national team of Iran, ended in a defeat. Ambartsumian left in the field for 76 minutes, replacing Aghvan Mkrtchyan.

== Career statistics ==
=== Club ===
As of matches played on 14 May 2023

Appearances and goals by club, season and competition
Club	Season	League			National cup		Super cup		Europe		Other		Total	
Club	Season	Division	Apps	Goals	Apps	Goals	Apps	Goals	Apps	Goals	Apps	Goals	Apps	Goals
Banants Yerevan	2010	Armenian Premier League	25	1	4	0	0	0	2	0	0	0	31	1
Banants Yerevan	2011	Armenian Premier League	26	1	4	0	1	0	2	0	0	0	33	1
Banants Yerevan	2012-13	Armenian Premier League	36	7	1	0	0	0	0	0	0	0	37	7
Banants Yerevan	2013-14	Armenian Premier League	27	4	2	0	0	0	0	0	0	0	29	4
Banants Yerevan	Total		114	13	11	0	1	0	4	0	0	0	130	13
Vardar	2014-15	First League	27	3	1	0	0	0	0	0	0	0	28	3
Vardar	2015-16	First League	26	7	2	0	1	0	2	0	0	0	31	7
Vardar	2016-17	First League	12	1	1	0	0	0	2	0	0	0	15	1
Vardar	2017-18	First League	14	2	0	0	0	0	11	0	0	0	25	2
Vardar	Total		79	13	4	0	1	0	15	0	0	0	99	13
EN Paralimni	2018–19	Cypriot First Division	24	1	4	0	0	0	0	0	0	0	28	1
EN Paralimni	2019–20	Cypriot First Division	18	3	2	0	0	0	0	0	0	0	20	3
EN Paralimni	Total		42	4	6	0	0	0	0	0	0	0	48	4
Anorthosis	2020–21	Cypriot First	21	2	3	0	0	0	1	0	0	0	25	2
Anorthosis	2021–22	Cypriot First	26	3	6	2	1	0	8	0	0	0	41	5
Anorthosis	2022–23	Cypriot First	18	1	2	0	0	0	0	0	0	0	20	1
Anorthosis	Total		65	6	11	2	1	0	9	0	0	0	68	7
Career total			300	36	32	2	3	0	28	0	0	0	363	38

=== International ===
As of match played 6 June 2025

Appearances and goals by national team and year
National team	Year	Apps	Goals
Armenia	2010	2	0
Armenia	2012	2	0
Armenia	2013	1	0
Armenia	2014	4	0
Armenia	2015	2	0
Armenia	2016	5	1
Armenia	2017	5	1
Armenia	2018	6	0
Armenia	2019	8	1
Armenia	2020	4	1
Armenia	2021	6	0
Armenia	2022	5	0
Armenia	2024	1	0
Armenia	2025	2	0
Total		53	4

Scores and results list Armenia's goal tally first, score column indicates score after each Hambardzumyan goal.

List of international goals scored by Hovhannes Hambardzumyan
No.	Date	Venue	Opponent	Score	Result	Competition
1.	1 June 2016	StubHub Center, Carson, United States	El Salvador	2–0	4–0	Friendly
2.	5 October 2017	Vazgen Sargsyan Republican Stadium, Yerevan, Armenia	Poland	1–3	1–6	2018 FIFA World Cup qualification
3.	8 September 2019	Vazgen Sargsyan Republican Stadium, Yerevan, Armenia	Bosnia and Herzegovina	3–2	4–2	UEFA Euro 2020 qualification
4.	18 November 2020	GSP Stadium, Nicosia, Cyprus	North Macedonia	1–0	1–0	2020–21 UEFA Nations League C

== Honours ==
Noah

- Armenian Premier League: 2024–25
- Armenian Cup: 2024–25, 2025–26
- Armenian Supercup: 2025

Banants Yerevan

- Armenian Premier League
  - Winner: 2013–14
  - Runner-up: 2010–11
- Armenian Cup
  - Runner-up: 2008-9, 2009–10, 2010–11
- Armenian Super Cup
  - Runner-up: 2008–9, 2010–11

Vardar

- Macedonian First League
  - Winner: 2014–15, 2015–16, 2016–17
- Macedonian Super Cup
  - Winner: 2015

Anorthosis

- Cypriot Cup
  - Winner: 2020–21
