= Boban Grnčarov =

Macedonian footballer

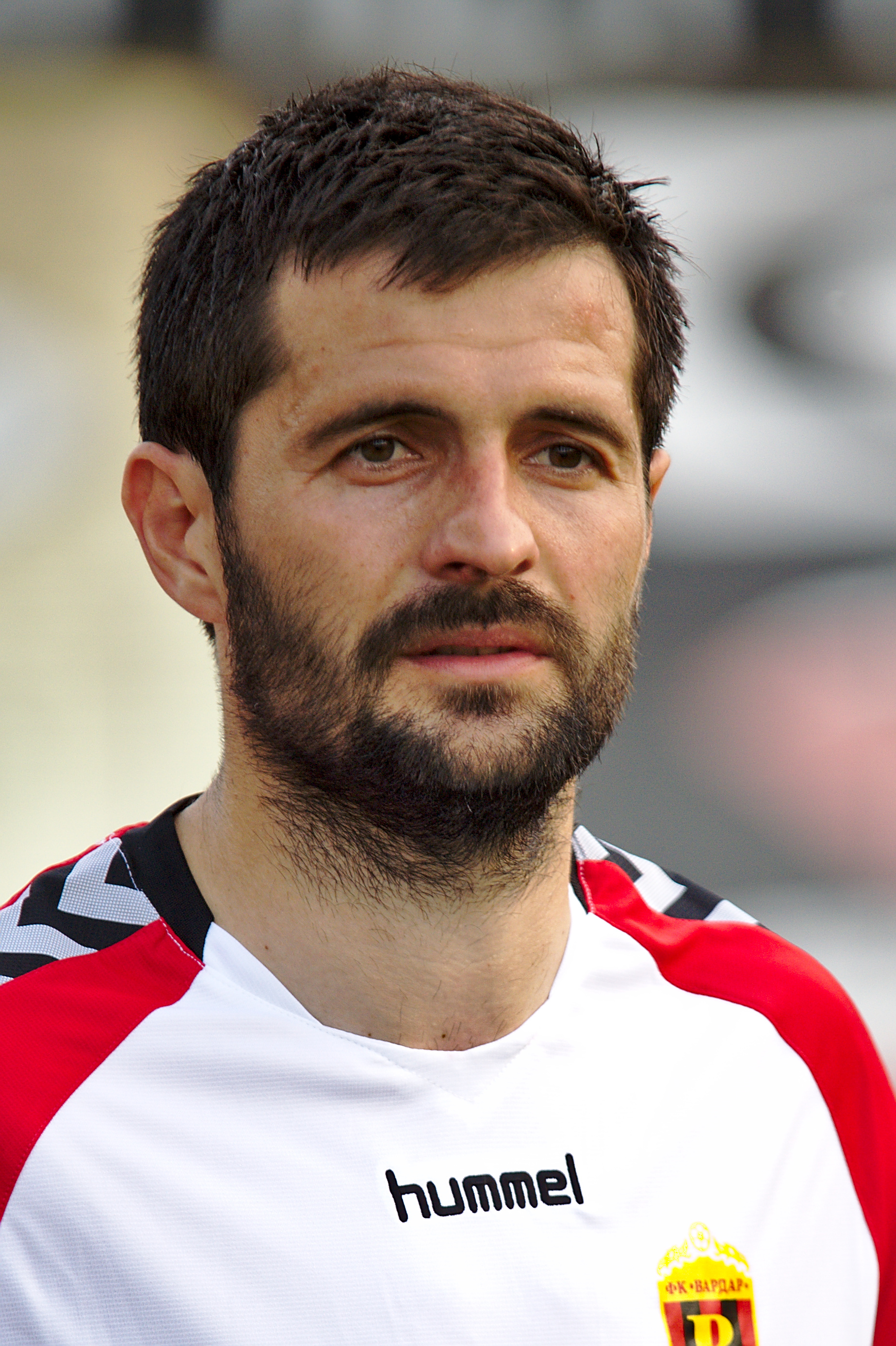
- Grnčarov with Vardar in 2017

Personal information
- Full name: Boban Grnčarov
- Date of birth: 12 August 1982 (age 44)
- Place of birth: Skopje, SFR Yugoslavia
- Height: 1.93 m (6 ft 4 in)
- Position: Centre-back

Youth career
- Vardar

Senior career*
Years	Team	Apps	(Gls)
1999–2000	Vardar	4	(0)
2000–2003	OFK Beograd	53	(2)
2003–2007	Metalurh Donetsk	29	(1)
2003	→ Metalurh-2 Donetsk	2	(0)
2006–2007	→ Stal Alchevsk (loan)	19	(1)
2007–2009	Gent	20	(3)
2008–2009	→ Maccabi Petah Tikva (loan)	31	(2)
2009–2011	APOEL	43	(8)
2011–2012	Lierse	29	(2)
2012–2013	Botev Plovdiv	45	(3)
2014	Tavriya Simferopol	8	(0)
2014–2018	Vardar	104	(11)

International career
2001–2014	Macedonia	34	(1)

Managerial career
- 2022–2023: Vardar
- 2024–: Makedonija G.P.
- * Club domestic league appearances and goals

Boban Grnčarov (Macedonian: Бобан Грнчаров; born 12 August 1982) is a Macedonian retired footballer who played as a central defender.

== Club career ==
=== OFK Beograd ===
Born in Skopje (SR Macedonia, SFR Yugoslavia), Grnčarov began his career playing with FK Vardar. After playing in their youth team, he made his senior debut in the 1998–99 season of the First Macedonian Football League. In 2000, he moved to Serbia and signed with OFK Beograd. By then he had already been a regular in the U-16, U-18 and U-21 national team levels his regular appearances in the First League of FR Yugoslavia at his first season with OFK made him earn his debut for the Macedonia national football team at the young age of 20. Despite his age, he has been a regular in the league starting line-up during those seasons in Belgrade, and following the success of his signing, OFK had turned their attention to the Macedonian market and, by the 2002–03 season, 5 other Macedonians were playing in OFK along Grnčarov: Bajevski, Despotovski, Fakić, Kirovski and Panov. During the previous seasons the club had been struggling to maintain consistency and Grnčarov became one of the fundamental players in the 2002–03 season when OFK finished the season in 3rd place and archive to qualify for European competitions after exactly 30 years of their last continental competition appearance. Grnčarov had played a total of 53 league matches, and scored 2 goals, at the time he left OFK Beograd.

In 2003, he moved to Ukraine and signed with Metalurh Donetsk where he played until 2006. After spending the first half of the 2006–07 season on loan to FC Stal Alchevsk, Grncarov signed a deal with KAA Gent in the Belgian Jupiler League. The season 2008–09 he moved on loan to Maccabi Petah Tikva.

=== APOEL ===
In June 2009, the board of APOEL announced that the player signed a two-year contract with the club. In his first season in Cyprus, he won the Super Cup (he scored a goal in the Super Cup final) and he also appeared in four official group stage matches of the 2009–10 UEFA Champions League with APOEL. The next season, he became an essential member of APOEL and – although he played in all matches as a central defender – he scored 6 goals in the league (all goals scored by head), helping his team to win the 2010–11 Cypriot First Division. In May 2011, Grnčarov left APOEL after two years, when the club and the player did not agree on signing a new contract due to financial reasons.

=== Lierse ===
On 5 July 2011, Grnčarov signed a one-year deal with Lierse with an option for an additional season.

=== Botev Plovdiv ===
On 3 July 2012, Grnčarov signed a three-year contract with Botev Plovdiv of the Bulgarian A PFG. On 9 March 2013, he scored the opening goal for Botev Plovdiv in the 2:0 milestone home win (the first one in 16 years) over Levski Sofia. In the end of 2013 Grncarov was removed from the first team after a scandal with the sports director of Botev Aleksandar Aleksandrov. During the winter break Grnčarov's contract was mutually terminated and after spending some time as a free agent, in mid January 2014 he joined Tavriya Simferopol in the Ukrainian Premier League.

== International career ==
He made his senior debut for Macedonia in a December 2001 friendly match against Oman and has earned a total of 34 caps, scoring 1 goal against Norway on 9 September 2009. His final international was a May 2014 friendly against Qatar.

=== International goals ===
Scores and results list Macedonia's goal tally first.

#	Date	Venue	Opponent	Score	Result	Competition
1.	9 September 2009	Ullevaal Stadion, Oslo, Norway	Norway	1–2	1–2	2010 FIFA World Cup qualification

== Honours ==
APOEL

- Cypriot First Division: 2010–11
- Cypriot Super Cup: 2009
