= Vladica Brdarovski =

Macedonian footballer

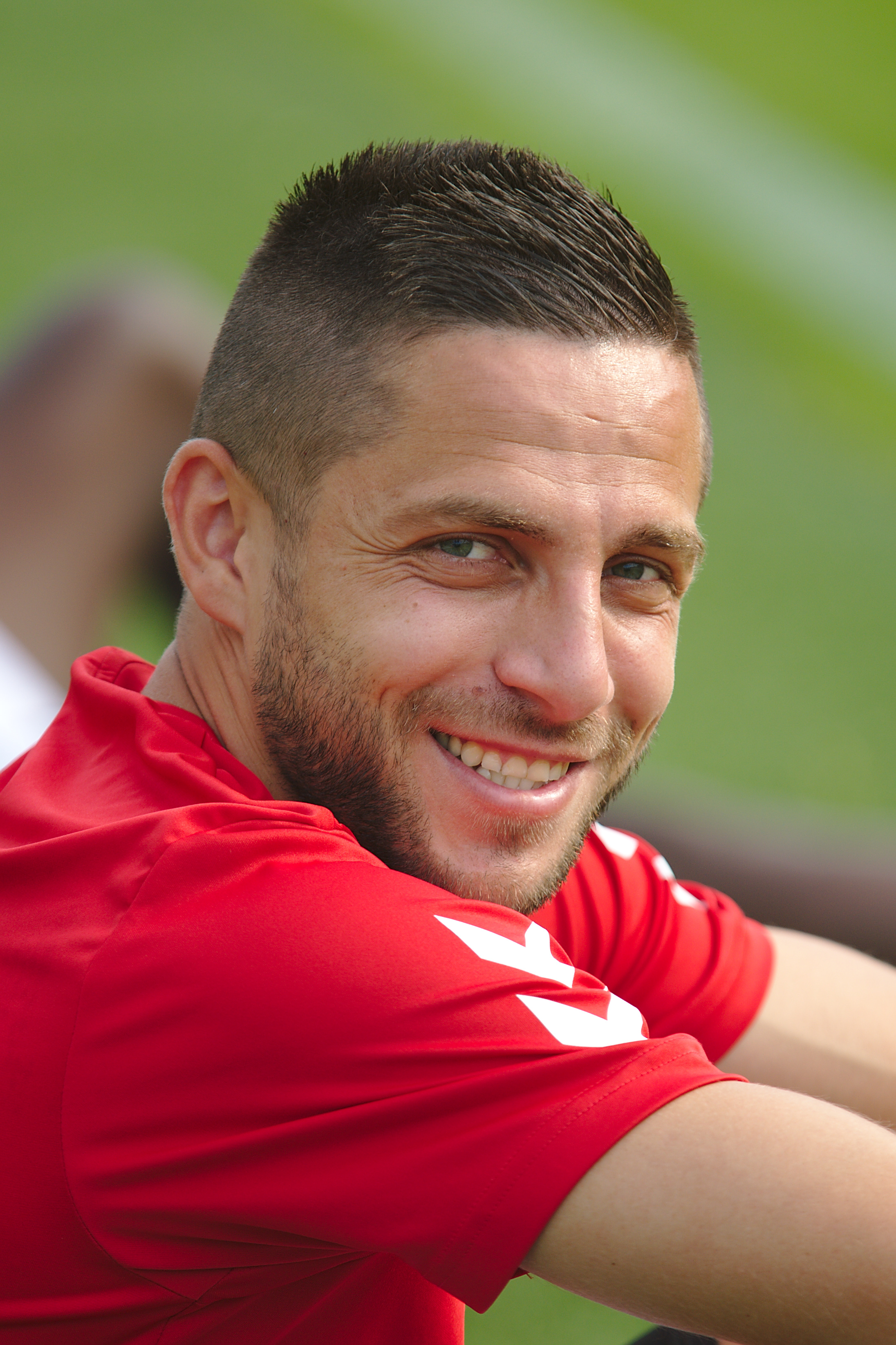

Personal information
- Full name: Vladica Brdarovski
- Date of birth: 7 February 1990 (age 36)
- Place of birth: Bitola, SR Macedonia, SFR Yugoslavia
- Height: 1.83 m (6 ft 0 in)
- Position: Right back

Team information
- Current team: Vardar
- Number: 77

Youth career
- Pelister

Senior career*
| Years | Team | Apps | (Gls) |
| 2009–2011 | Pelister | 28 | (0) |
| 2011 | Zbrojovka Brno | 3 | (0) |
| 2011–2013 | Rabotnichki | 53 | (0) |
| 2013–2014 | Pelister | 36 | (0) |
| 2015 | Győri ETO | 11 | (0) |
| 2015–2020 | Vardar | 109 | (5) |
| 2020–2021 | Drita | 18 | (0) |
| 2021–2023 | Shkupi | 51 | (0) |
| 2023– | Vardar | 40 | (0) |

International career^{‡}
| 2010–2012 | North Macedonia U21 | 17 | (1) |
| 2012–2023 | North Macedonia | 9 | (0) |
- * Club domestic league appearances and goals as of 8 December 2024 ‡ National team caps and goals as of 17 November 2015

Vladica Brdarovski (Macedonian: Владица Брдаровски; born 7 February 1990 in Bitola) is a Macedonian footballer who currently plays for Vardar.

== Club career ==
Brdarovski began his career with his home town club FK Pelister before he joined Rabotnički in January 2011. The same month he received the award for Best young player of the first half-season in 2010–11 by the internet portal MacedonianFootball.com.

Brdarovski made a comeback to his first club FK Pelister on 1 August 2013.

== International career ==
He made his senior debut for North Macedonia in a December 2012 friendly match against Poland and has earned a total of 7 caps, scoring no goals. His final international was a November 2015 friendly match against Lebanon.
