= Nikola Gligorov =

Macedonian footballer

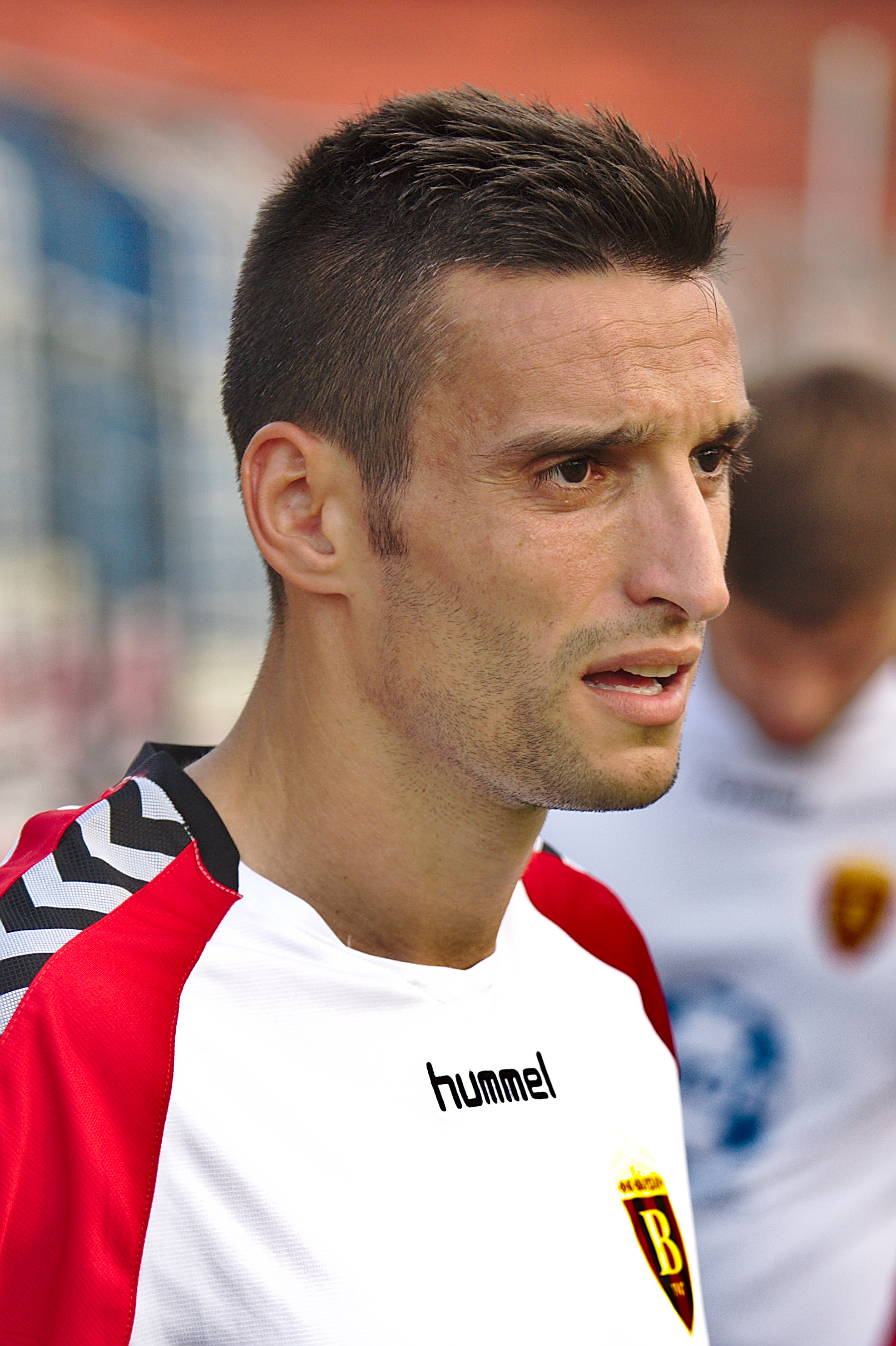
- Gligorov 2017

Personal information
- Date of birth: 15 August 1983 (age 43)
- Place of birth: Skopje, SR Macedonia, Yugoslavia
- Height: 1.78 m (5 ft 10 in)
- Position: Central midfielder

Senior career*
Years	Team	Apps	(Gls)
2001–2002	Alumina	0	(0)
2002–2004	Cementarnica 55	38	(2)
2004–2006	Vardar	54	(2)
2007	Bežanija	6	(0)
2007–2008	Rabotnichki	27	(2)
2008–2009	Vardar	24	(3)
2009–2011	Rabotnichki	62	(8)
2011–2013	Alki Larnaca	54	(3)
2013–2014	Khazar Lankaran	23	(2)
2014–2018	Vardar	114	(4)
2018–2019	Ethnikos Achna	29	(4)
Total		431	(28)

International career^{‡}
1999	Macedonia U-16	2	(0)
	Macedonia U-19	4	(0)
	Macedonia U-21	11	(1)
2010–2016	Macedonia	25	(0)

Managerial career
- 2019–2020: Vardar (youth team coach)
- 2020–2021: Vardar (assistant)
- 2021–2022: Vardar
- * Club domestic league appearances and goals as of 5 August 2020 ‡ National team caps and goals as of 5 August 2020

Nikola Gligorov (Macedonian: Никола Глигоров; born 15 August 1983) is a Macedonian football manager and former professional player who played as a defensive midfielder. He was a recently the head coach of FK Vardar.

== Club career ==
Gligorov started his career at Vardar Skopje but was loaned right away to FK Alumina, and later to FK Cementarnica 55 Skopje. At 2004–05 season he was regular at Vardar Skopje and stayed there until the winter-breal of the 2006–07 season. Then he moved to neighbouring Serbia where he joined Serbian SuperLiga side FK Bežanija playing there the second half of the 2006–07 season along his compatriots Mario Đurovski, Bojan Markoski, Perica Stančeski and Aleksandar Donev. They finished the season at 4th place, however, he left the Serbian club at the end of the season. He came back to the Macedonian championship, playing for Rabotnički Skopje, and from there he made a transfer to Vardar Skopje just to get back to Rabotnički Skopje the following season where he stayed till the end of the season 2010/2011. After that he played for a Cypriot club Alki Larnaca for two seasons, before signing for FK Khazar Lankaran on 28 May 2013. He made his debut in the first game of the season in a 1–1 draw against Sliema from Malta in Europa league qualification round.

== International career ==
Gligorov made his senior debut for Macedonian national team on 11 August 2010 in an away friendly game against Malta that finished 1–1. He is yet to score his debut goal. He had previously represented the U-16, U-19 and U-21 teams since 1999. He has earned a total of 25 caps, scoring no goals and his final international was a March 2016 friendly match against Bulgaria.

== Career statistics ==
As of 22 November 2013

Club statistics
Season	Club	League	League		Cup		Other		Total	
Season	Club	League	App	Goals	App	Goals	App	Goals	App	Goals
2002–03	Cementarnica 55	1. MFL	13	0					13	0
2003–04	Cementarnica 55	1. MFL	25	2			4	0	29	2
2004–05	Vardar	1. MFL	30	1					30	1
2005–06	Vardar	1. MFL	14	0			4	0	18	0
2006–07	Vardar	1. MFL	10	1			2	0	12	1
2006–07	Bežanija	Serbian SuperLiga	6	0			-		6	0
2007–08	Rabotnički	1. MFL	27	2			-		27	2
2008–09	Vardar	1. MFL	24	3			-		24	3
2009–10	Rabotnički	1. MFL	25	2			3	0	28	2
2010–11	Rabotnički	1. MFL	32	4			6	1	38	5
2011–12	Rabotnički	1. MFL	1	0			0	0	1	0
2011–12	Alki Larnaca	Cypriot First Division	28	2	4	1	-		32	3
2012–13	Alki Larnaca	Cypriot First Division	26	1	2	0	-		28	1
2013–14	Khazar Lankaran	Azerbaijan Premier League	19	1	0	0	4	0	23	1
Macedonia			197	15			19	1	216	16
Serbia			6	0			0	0	6	0
Cyprus			54	3	6	1	0	0	60	4
Azerbaijan			19	1	0	0	4	0	23	1
Total			265	18	6	1	23	1	294	20

== Honours ==
=== Club ===
Cementarnica 55

- Macedonian Cup: 2002-03

Rabotnicki Skopje

- Macedonian League: 2007-08
- Macedonian Cup: 2007-08

Khazar Lankaran

- Azerbaijan Supercup: 2013

Vardar Skopje

- Macedonian League: 2014–15, 2015-16, 2016–17
- Macedonian Super Cup: 2015
