= Aco Stojkov =

Macedonian footballer

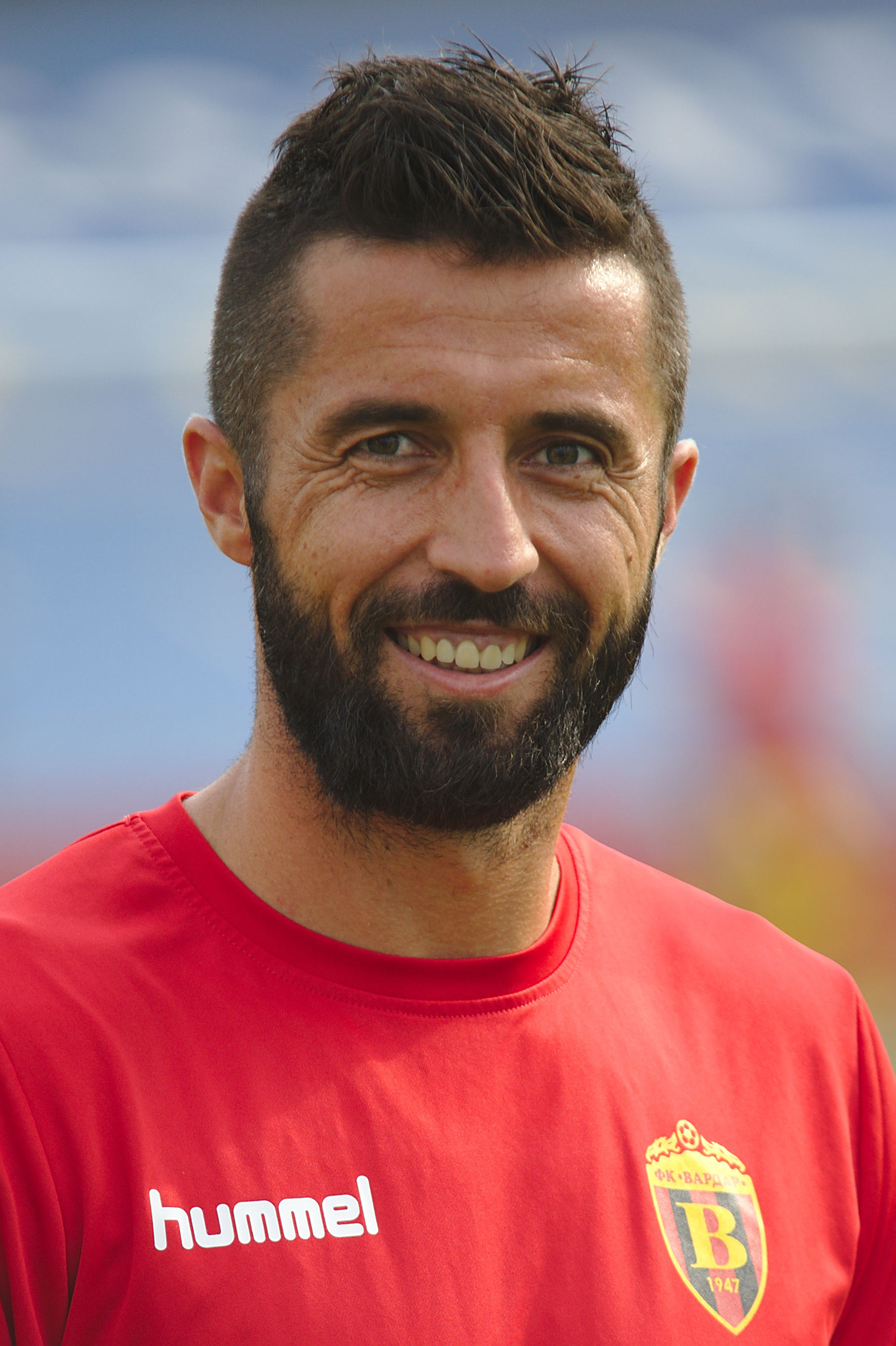
- Stojkov with Vardar in 2017

Personal information
- Date of birth: 29 April 1983 (age 43)
- Place of birth: Strumica, SFR Yugoslavia
- Height: 1.77 m (5 ft 9 1/2 in)
- Position: Striker

Youth career
- –1999: Belasica
- 2001–2002: Inter Milan

Senior career*
Years	Team	Apps	(Gls)
2000–2001	Belasica	15	(7)
2001–2005	Inter Milan	0	(0)
2002–2003	→ Spezia (loan)	14	(0)
2003	→ Górnik Zabrze (loan)	5	(1)
2004	→ Castel di Sangro (loan)	8	(1)
2004–2005	→ Andria (loan)	20	(2)
2005–2006	La Louviére	14	(7)
2006	Partizan	0	(0)
2007–2009	Debrecen	20	(6)
2008–2009	→ Nyíregyháza (loan)	25	(6)
2010–2012	FC Aarau	67	(23)
2012	Zob Ahan	5	(1)
2013	Vardar	27	(17)
2014	Botoșani	13	(2)
2014	Rabotnički	11	(9)
2015	Skënderbeu	13	(3)
2015–2018	Vardar	29	(5)
2018–2019	Akademija Pandev	28	(2)
2019	Osogovo	11	(2)

International career
	Macedonia U17	5	(2)
	Macedonia U18	2	(1)
	Macedonia U19	2	(0)
	Macedonia U21	13	(4)
2002–2014	Macedonia	42	(5)
- * Club domestic league appearances and goals

Aco Stojkov (Macedonian: Ацо Стојков; born 29 April 1983) is a Macedonian former professional footballer who played as a striker.

== Club career ==
In his early years, he played with his compatriot Goran Pandev for Inter Milan youth teams. He was then loaned to lower-level teams in Italy and Polish top flight to gain some experience but failed to impress Inter and his contract with them expired. Stojkov has since played in Belgium, Serbia, Hungary and Switzerland. He joined Partizan in summer of 2006 and played with the club during the first half of the 2006–07 season. Although he did not made any league appearance, he played one match in the Serbian Cup. He was renowned for his speed and dribbling abilities.

== International career ==
He has represented his country on all youth levels before making his senior debut for Macedonia in an August 2002 friendly match against Malta in Skopje. He has earned a total of 42 caps, scoring 5 goals. His final international was a November 2014 European Championship qualification match against Slovakia.

=== International goals ===
Scores and results list Macedonia's goal tally first, score column indicates score after each Stojkov goal.

List of international goals scored by Aco Stojkov
No.	Date	Venue	Opponent	Score	Result	Competition
1	21 August 2002	Toše Proeski Arena, Skopje, Macedonia	Malta	1–0	5–0	Friendly
2	7 June 2003	Toše Proeski Arena, Skopje, Macedonia	Liechtenstein	3–1	3–1	UEFA Euro 2004 qualifying
3	9 October 2004	Toše Proeski Arena, Skopje, Macedonia	Netherlands	2–2	2–2	2006 FIFA World Cup qualifying
4	2 June 2007	Toše Proeski Arena, Skopje, Macedonia	Israel	1–1	1–2	UEFA Euro 2008 qualifying
5	10 June 2009	Toše Proeski Arena, Skopje, Macedonia	Iceland	1–0	2–0	2010 FIFA World Cup qualifying

== Honours ==
Debrecen

- Nemzeti Bajnokság I: 2006–07
- Magyar Kupa: 2007–08
- Szuperkupa: 2007

Vardar

- Macedonian First League: 2012–13, 2015–16, 2016–17
- Macedonian Super Cup: 2013, 2015

Rabotnicki

- Macedonian Cup: 2014–15

Skënderbeu

- Albanian Superliga: 2014–15

Akademija Pandev

- Macedonian Cup: 2018–19
