= Juan Felipe =

Brazilian footballer

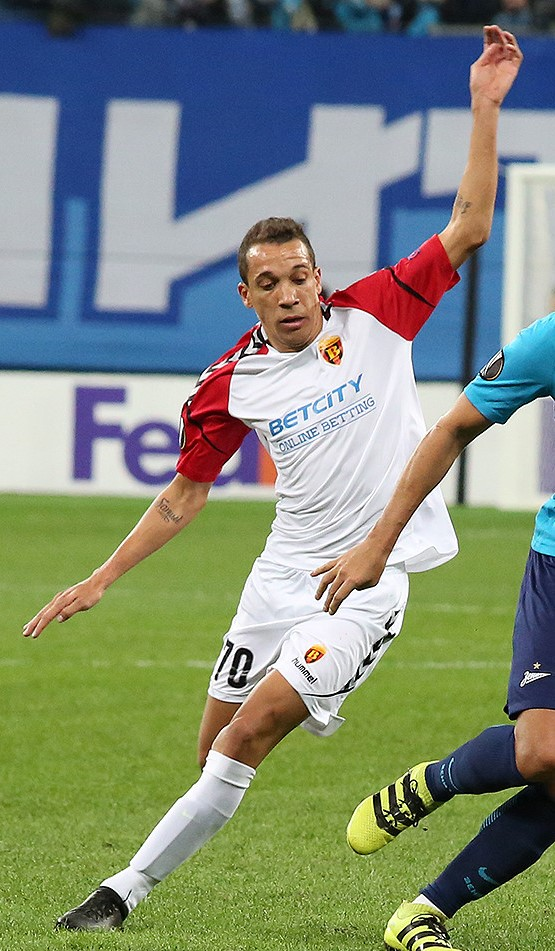

Personal information
- Full name: Juan Felipe Alves Ribeiro
- Date of birth: 5 December 1987 (age 38)
- Place of birth: São Vicente, Brazil
- Height: 1.75 m (5 ft 9 in)
- Position: Midfielder

Team information
- Current team: Enosis Neon Paralimni
- Number: 70

Youth career
- Santos
- 2007: São Vicente

Senior career*
Years	Team	Apps	(Gls)
2008	Jabaquara		
2009	Santa Cruz		
2009–2010	Mirassol		
2011	Santo André	14	(1)
2012	Red Bull Brasil	2	(0)
2012–2013	Oriente Petrolero	9	(1)
2013	Oratório		
2013–2014	São Carlos	13	(1)
2014–2015	CSKA Sofia	28	(3)
2015–2018	Vardar	87	(24)
2018	Kairat	24	(0)
2019	Vardar	18	(4)
2019	Shkëndija	10	(1)
2020	Bangu	5	(1)
2020–	Enosis Neon Paralimni	37	(8)
- * Club domestic league appearances and goals as of 09:58, 9 June 2021 (UTC)

Juan Felipe Alves Ribeiro, better known as Juan Felipe, (born 5 December 1987) is a Brazilian professional footballer who plays as a midfielder for Enosis Neon Paralimni.

== Career ==
Juan Felipe played for Santo Andre and Red Bull Brasil, before moving to Bolivia in 2012 to play for Oriente Petrolero. Felipe only made nine league appearances during the season with Oriente Petrolero, scoring one goal. After one season in the Liga de Fútbol Profesional Boliviano he moved to São Carlos.

On 12 July 2014, Juan Felipe signed with Bulgarian side CSKA Sofia on a two-year deal. He made his debut in a 4–0 home win over Haskovo on 10 August, coming on as a second-half substitute. His first goal came twenty days later, netting the 3rd in a 3–0 away win over Lokomotiv Plovdiv. On 30 November, Felipe missed a penalty for CSKA in a 0–0 draw against Marek Dupnitsa at Bonchuk Stadium.

On 29 March 2018, Felipe signed a one-year contract, with the option of an additional year, with Kazakhstan Premier League club FC Kairat.

== Career statistics ==
As of 31 May 2015

Appearances and goals by club, season and competition
Club	Season	League			State league		Cup		Continental		Total	
Club	Season	Division	Apps	Goals	Apps	Goals	Apps	Goals	Apps	Goals	Apps	Goals
Santo Andre	2011	Série C	0	0	14	1	2	0	–		16	1
Red Bull Brasil	2012		0	0	2	0	0	0	–		2	0
Oriente Petrolero	2012–13	Liga Boliviano	9	1	–		0	0	2	0	11	1
São Carlos	2013		0	0	0	0	11	1	–		11	1
São Carlos	2014		0	0	13	1	0	0	–		13	1
CSKA Sofia	2014–15	A Group	28	3	–		1	0	0	0	29	3
Career total			37	4	29	2	15	1	2	0	83	7

== Honours ==
Vardar

- Macedonian First League: 2015–16, 2016–17
- Macedonian Super Cup: 2015
