= Stephan Vujčić =

German footballer

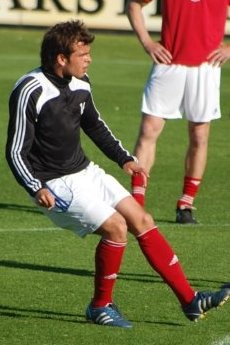
- Vujčić with Holstein Kiel

Personal information
- Date of birth: 3 January 1986 (age 40)
- Place of birth: Hamburg, West Germany
- Height: 1.83 m (6 ft 0 in)
- Position: Midfielder

Youth career
- Hamburger SV
- Holstein Kiel

Senior career*
Years	Team	Apps	(Gls)
2005–2007	Holstein Kiel II	50	(1)
2007–2010	Holstein Kiel	53	(2)
2010–2011	Rabotnichki	42	(4)
2011–2013	Inter Zaprešić	66	(1)
2014–2016	Rabotnichki	57	(2)
2016–2018	Shkendija	62	(1)
2018	Shkupi	10	(0)
2018–2019	Belasica	22	(0)
2020–2022	USC Paloma	6	(2)
- * Club domestic league appearances and goals as of 22:30, 20 September 2022 (UTC)

Stephan Vujčić (Croatian: Štefan Vujčić; born 3 January 1986) is a former German professional footballer who most recently played for USC Paloma.

== Career ==
Vujčić was born in Hamburg. He has previously played for the youth team of Hamburger SV and in senior career he played for Holstein Kiel, FK Rabotnički and KF Shkëndija. He made his professional debut in 2009, when Kiel beat Werder Bremen II 4–0.

After nearly five years in North Macedonia, Vujčić returned to Germany and joined USC Paloma in March 2020.
