= Filip Gachevski =

Slovenian-Macedonian footballer

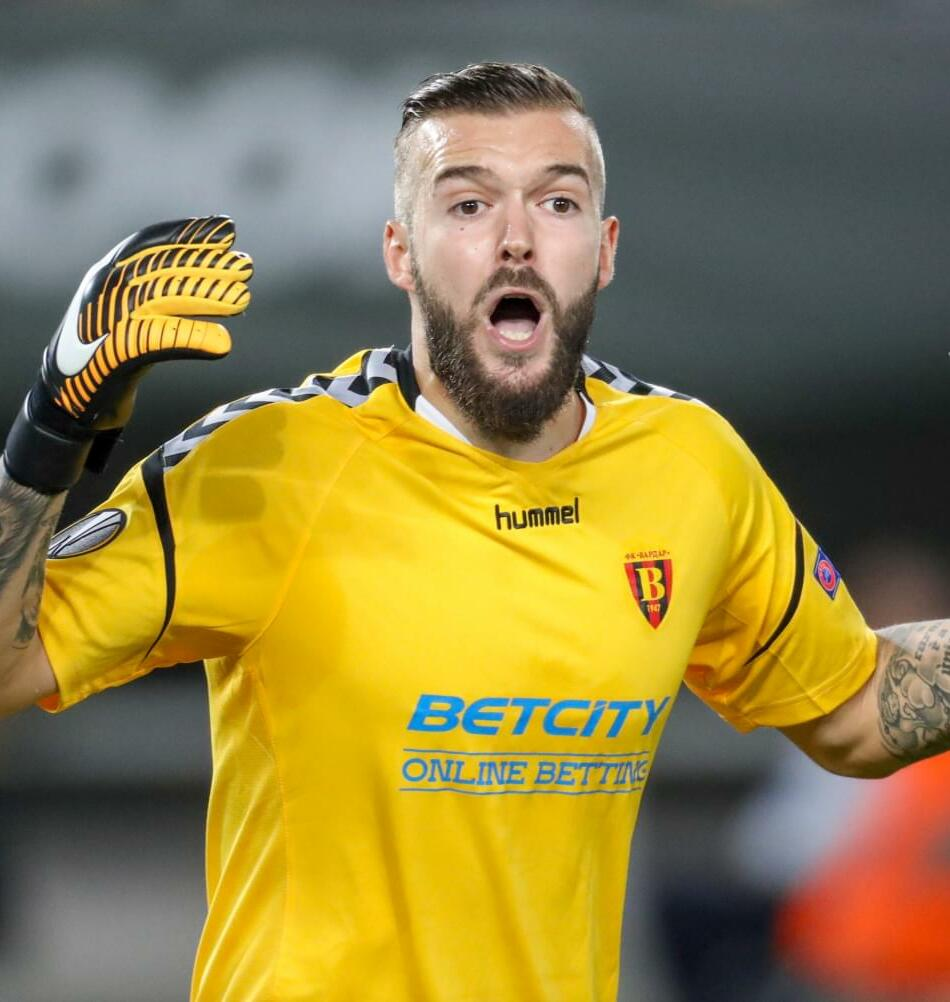
- Gachevski with Vardar in 2017

Personal information
- Date of birth: 17 August 1990 (age 36)
- Place of birth: Murska Sobota, SR Slovenia, SFR Yugoslavia
- Height: 1.92 m (6 ft 4 in)
- Position: Goalkeeper

Team information
- Current team: Vardar
- Number: 87

Senior career*
| Years | Team | Apps | (Gls) |
| 2008–2010 | Mura 05 | 16 | (0) |
| 2010–2014 | Kapfenberger SV | 4 | (0) |
| 2010–2014 | Kapfenberger SV II | 40 | (0) |
| 2013 | → FC Lustenau 07 (loan) | 17 | (0) |
| 2014–2015 | Bregalnica Štip | 33 | (0) |
| 2015–2020 | Vardar | 117 | (0) |
| 2020–2021 | Enosis Neon Paralimni | 29 | (0) |
| 2022– | Vardar | 87 | (0) |

International career^{‡}
| 2008–2012 | Macedonia U21 | 15 | (0) |
- * Club domestic league appearances and goals as of 8 December 2024 ‡ National team caps and goals as of 26 August 2015

Filip Gachevski (Macedonian: Филип Гачевски, born 17 August 1990) is a Macedonian footballer who plays as a goalkeeper for Macedonian First League club Vardar.

== Youth career ==
In his youth, Filip played football in Slovenian and Austrian football clubs, most prominently in his local club Mura 05, before moving to Macedonia.

== International career ==
In November 2016 he received his first call-up to the senior Macedonia squad for a match against Spain.
