= Macedonian Football Supercup =

- Founded: 1996 (unofficial); 2011 (official)
- Abolished: 2015
- Region: North Macedonia
- Teams: 2
- Last champions: Vardar Skopje (2nd title)
- Most championships: Vardar Skopje (2 titles)

The Macedonian Football Supercup was an annual one-match football competition. The two participating clubs were the Macedonian First Football League champion and the Macedonian Football Cup winner.

The inaugural edition of the trophy was in 1996 which was won by Sloga Jugomagnat, but the edition is still not officially recognized by Football Federation of Macedonia. The first official edition of the trophy was in 2011 which was won by Shkëndija. The competition was played for only two more years, in 2013 and 2015, both times he won Vardar.

== Matches ==
=== Unofficial ===
==== 1996 ====
16 June 1996
18:00 CEST

Sileks	0–2	Sloga Jugomagnat
	Report	Kolashinac 8'; Miserdovski 23'

Stadion Mladost, Strumica
Referee: Stojcho Saganov (Strumica)
From 10th minute: Vancho Kocev (Shtip)

=== Official ===
==== 2011 ====
24 July 2011
18:30 CEST

Shkëndija	2–1	Metalurg
Mustafi 6' (pen.); Sali 84'	Report	Stevanović 87'

Philip II Arena, Skopje
Attendance: 2,000
Referee: Dimitar Mechkarovski (Skopje)

==== 2013 ====
28 July 2013
20:00 CEST

Vardar	1–0	Teteks
Petrov 54'	Report

Philip II Arena, Skopje
Attendance: 100
Referee: Dimitar Mechkarovski (Skopje)

==== 2015 ====
23 September 2015
20:00 CEST

Vardar	1–1 (a.e.t.)	Rabotnički
Ivanovski 11'	Report	Ilijoski 47'
Penalties
Hambardzumyan (penalty scored); Stojkov (penalty scored); Ivanovski (penalty missed); Gligorov (penalty scored); Felipe (penalty scored)	4–3	(penalty scored) Cikarski; (penalty scored) Vujčić; (penalty scored) Ilievski; (penalty missed) Altiparmakovski; (penalty missed) Ristevski

Philip II Arena, Skopje
Attendance: 1,500
Referee: Aleksandar Stavrev (Skopje)

== Performances ==
=== Performance by club ===
Club	Winners	Runners-up	Winning Years	Runners-up Years
Vardar	2	–	2013, 2015	–
Shkëndija	1	–	2011	–
Sloga Jugomagnat	1	–	1996	–
Sileks	–	1	–	1996
Metalurg	–	1	–	2011
Rabotnichki	–	1	–	2015
Teteks	–	1	–	2013
