= List of North Macedonia international footballers =

This is a list of all footballers that have played for national team of North Macedonia. Ordered by position and followed by number of appearances and goals.

== List ==
Most recent call-ups are in bold.

Updated 13 November 2026.

=== Goalkeepers ===
- **Stole Dimitrievski** (96/0)
- Petar Miloševski (59/0)
- Tome Pachovski (46/0)
- Jane Nikolovski (27/0)
- Dančo Celeski (22/0)
- Martin Bogatinov (18/0)
- Edin Nuredinoski (14/0)
- **Damjan Shishkovski** (12/0)
- Antonio Filevski (10/0)
- Gogo Jovčev (9/0)
- Goce Grujovski (8/0)
- Kristijan Naumovski (7/0)
- Kire Trajchev (7/0)
- Saša Ilić (5/0)
- Oka Nikolov (5/0)
- Muarem Zekir (4/0)
- Filip Madžovski (3/0)
- Zoran Micevski (3/0)
- Andreja Efremov (2/0)
- Igor Aleksovski (1/0)
- Dejan Iliev (1/0)
- Ljupčo Kmetovski (1/0)
- David Mitov Nilsson (1/0)
- **Davor Taleski** (1/0)
- Darko Tofiloski (1/0)
- Kostadin Zahov (1/0)

=== Defenders ===
- Goce Sedloski (100/8)
- **Ezgjan Alioski** (94/13)
- Stefan Ristovski (82/2)
- **Visar Musliu** (80/2)
- Igor Mitreski (70/1)
- Nikolče Noveski (64/5)
- Darko Velkovski (62/3)
- Kire Ristevski (59/0)
- Vanče Šikov (56/4)
- Gjoko Zajkov (48/1)
- Goran Popov (46/2)
- Igor Nikolovski (43/2)
- Vlade Lazarevski (43/0)
- Goran Stavrevski (40/3)
- Stefan Ashkovski (40/0)
- Daniel Mojsov (39/0)
- Aleksandar Vasoski (34/2)
- Boban Grnčarov (34/1)
- Robert Petrov (31/0)
- Ljupčo Markovski (30/1)
- **Nikola Serafimov** (29/1)
- Zoran Jovanovski (29/0)
- Mitko Stojkovski (27/5)
- Egzon Bejtulai (27/0)
- Milan Stojanoski (26/1)
- Boban Babunski (23/1) + YUG (2/0)
- Daniel Georgievski (22/0)
- Bojan Dimoski (21/0)
- Dragan Veselinovski (20/0)
- Robert Popov (18/0)
- Igor Gjuzelov (17/1)
- Vasko Božinovski (17/0)
- Aleksandar Todorovski (16/0)
- Leonard Zuta (15/0)
- **Bojan Ilievski** (14/0)
- Aleksandar Lazevski (14/0)
- Jovan Manev (13/1)
- Ilija Najdoski (10/0) + YUG (11/1)
- Andrej Stojchevski (10/0)
- Vladica Brdarovski (9/0)
- Marjan Gerasimovski (9/0)
- Dimitar Kapinkovski (9/0)
- Panče Ḱumbev (9/0)
- Ljubodrag Milošević (9/0)
- Kristijan Toshevski (9/0)
- Miroslav Vajs (9/0)
- Risto Milosavov (8/0)
- Sašo Zdravevski (8/0)
- Kire Grozdanov (7/0)
- Zekirija Ramadan (7/0)
- Vujadin Stanojković (7/0) + YUG (21/1)
- Aguinaldo Braga (6/0)
- Ardian Cuculi (6/0)
- Dejan Dimitrovski (6/0)
- **Mario Mladenovski** (6/0)
- Todor Todoroski (6/0)
- Čedomir Janevski (5/1) + YUG (2/0)
- **Sebastián Herrera** (5/0)
- Ahmed Iljazovski (5/0)
- Sasho Karadjov (4/1)
- Husein Beganović (4/0)
- Aleksandar Damčevski (4/0)
- **Stefan Despotovski** (4/0)
- Vladimir Dimitrovski (4/0)
- Daniel Ivanovski (4/0)
- Sašo Janev (4/0)
- Igor Nikolaevski (4/0)
- Goran Siljanovski (4/0)
- Svetozar Stankovski (4/0)
- Nikola Tanushev (4/0)
- Borche Jovanovski (3/1)
- Din Alomerovikj (3/0)
- Mite Cikarski (3/0)
- **Imran Fetai** (3/0)
- Nikola Karčev (3/0)
- Igor Kralevski (3/0)
- Blagoja Ljamchevski (3/0)
- **Anes Meliqi** (3/0)
- Igor Stojanov (3/0)
- Yani Urdinov (3/0)
- Xhelil Abdulla (2/0)
- Shkumbin Arsllani (2/0)
- Besir Demiri (2/0)
- Ilir Elmazovski (2/0)
- Goran Georgievski (2/0)
- Darko Glishikj (2/0)
- Goran Hristovski (2/0)
- Goran Jovanovski (2/0)
- Tome Kitanovski (2/0)
- Darko Krsteski (2/0)
- Marjan Nikolov (2/0)
- Dragan Siljanovski (2/0)
- Goran Stanić (2/0)
- Sedat Berisha (1/0)
- Esad Čolaković (1/0)
- Gjorge Djekov (1/0)
- Toni Jakimovski (1/0)
- Georgije Jankulov (1/0)
- Vancho Kostov (1/0)
- Metodi Maksimov (1/0)
- Bojan Markovski (1/0)
- Agron Memedi (1/0)
- Zija Merxhani (1/0)
- Blagoja Milevski (1/0)
- Vlatko Novakov (1/0)
- Panche Ristevski (1/0)
- Perica Stančeski (1/0)
- Metodija Stepanovski (1/0)
- Jordancho Stojmenovski (1/0)
- Zlatko Tanevski (1/0)
- Vlado Trifunov (1/0)

=== Midfielders ===
- **Enis Bardhi** (88/20)
- **Eljif Elmas** (85/14)
- Veliče Šumulikoski (84/1)
- Artim Šakiri (72/15)
- Stefan Spirovski (55/1)
- **Boban Nikolov** (52/4)
- Vlatko Grozdanoski (50/4)
- Darko Tasevski (45/1)
- **Darko Churlinov** (44/5)
- Toni Micevski (44/4)
- Ferhan Hasani (43/2)
- Agim Ibraimi (40/7)
- Tihomir Kostadinov (38/0)
- Vančo Trajanov (36/3)
- **Jani Atanasov** (35/3)
- Žarko Serafimovski (34/3)
- Aleksandar Mitreski (34/0)
- Arijan Ademi (33/4)
- Nedžmedin Memedi (32/2)
- Igor Jančevski (28/0)
- Dževdet Šainovski (26/2)
- Muhamed Demiri (25/0)
- Nikola Gligorov (25/0)
- Goran Lazarevski (25/0)
- Isnik Alimi (23/2)
- Srgjan Zaharievski (22/3)
- Mile Krstev (22/2)
- Vlatko Gošev (22/0)
- Slavčo Georgievski (21/0)
- **Agon Elezi** (20/0)
- Goce Toleski (18/1)
- David Babunski (18/0)
- Filip Despotovski (18/0)
- Ostoja Stjepanović (18/0)
- Viktor Trenevski (17/0)
- Artim Položani (14/0)
- Armend Alimi (13/0)
- Panče Stojanov (13/0)
- Mario Gjurovski (12/2)
- Besart Abdurahimi (12/1)
- Stojan Ignatov (11/0)
- Sašo Lazarevski (11/0)
- Sašo Miloševski (10/1)
- **Dimitar Mitrovski** (11/0)
- Dragi Kanatlarovski (9/2) + YUG (1/0)
- Milovan Petrovikj (9/0)
- Rade Karanfilovski (8/1)
- Daniel Avramovski (8/0)
- Toni Savevski (8/0) + YUG (2/0)
- Boško Gjurovski (7/3) + YUG (4/0)
- **Luka Stankovski** (7/1)
- Blaže Georgioski (7/0)
- Muarem Muarem (7/0)
- Nebi Mustafi (7/0)
- Vančo Trajčev (7/0)
- Marjan Stojkovski (6/1)
- **Matej Gashtarov** (6/0)
- Toni Naumovski (6/0)
- Dushko Trajchevski (6/0)
- Kire Markoski (5/1)
- Ilcho Borov (5/0)
- Blaže Georgioski (5/0)
- Nikola Gjorgjev (5/0)
- Dančo Masev (5/0)
- Dejan Blazhevski (4/1)
- Toni Banduliev (4/0)
- Valon Ethemi (4/0)
- Gorancho Georgiev (4/0)
- Ilami Halimi (4/0)
- Bojan Najdenov (4/0)
- Blagoja Todorovski (4/0)
- Jovica Trajčev (4/0)
- Vulnet Emini (3/0)
- Dragan Gjorgiev (3/0)
- Goce Markovski (3/0)
- Toni Meglenski (3/0)
- Ivan Nastevski (3/0)
- Reshat Ramadani (3/0)
- Predrag Ranđelović (3/0)
- Zoran Vasevski (3/0)
- Nikolche Zdravevski (3/0)
- Almir Bajramovski (2/0)
- Naum Batkoski (2/0)
- Besmir Bojku (2/0)
- Blagoja Dimitrov (2/0)
- Nijaz Lena (2/0)
- Riste Markoski (2/0)
- Darko Micevski (2/0)
- Dejan Peshevski (2/0)
- Erdal Rakip (2/0)
- Tauljant Sulejmanov (2/0)
- Zlatko Todorovski (2/0)
- Borislav Tomovski (2/0)
- Erol Topchiu (2/0)
- Ennur Totre (2/0)
- Ali Adem (1/0)
- Darko Angjeleski (1/0)
- Muharem Bajrami (1/0)
- Bobi Bozhinovski (1/0)
- Ertan Demiri (1/0)
- Sefer Emini (1/0)
- Enis Fazlagikj (1/0)
- Gilson (1/0)
- Tomche Grozdanovski (1/0)
- Gligor Gligorov (1/0)
- Muhamed Huseini (1/0)
- Dejan Milošeski (1/0)
- Martin Mirchevski (1/0)
- Ivan Mitrov (1/0)
- Nderim Nexhipi (1/0)
- Ivan Nikolov (1/0)
- Bunjamin Shabani (1/0)
- Gjorgi Stoilov (1/0)
- Denis Trajkovski (1/0)

=== Forwards ===
- Goran Pandev (122/38)
- Aleksandar Trajkovski (98/24)
- Ivan Trichkovski (67/7)
- Ilija Nestorovski (52/10)
- Georgi Hristov (48/16)
- Ilčo Naumoski (46/9)
- Goran Maznov (45/10)
- Bojan Miovski (45/8)
- Aco Stojkov (43/5)
- Milan Ristovski (40/4)
- Mirko Ivanovski (27/1)
- Saša Ćirić (26/8)
- Adis Jahović (19/3)
- Argjend Beqiri (17/1)
- Marjan Radeski (17/1)
- Stevica Ristić (17/1)
- Zoran Boškovski (16/5)
- Besart Ibraimi (16/0)
- **Ljupcho Doriev** (15/0)
- Krste Velkoski (15/0)
- Dragan Dimitrovski (14/2)
- Lirim Qamili (14/2)
- Blazhe Ilijoski (14/1)
- Dragan Načevski (14/1)
- Jovan Kostovski (13/2)
- **Elmin Rastoder** (13/1)
- Vlatko Stojanovski (10/2)
- Vančo Micevski (9/4)
- Dušan Savić (9/0)
- Miroslav Gjokić (8/2)
- Filip Ivanovski (8/1)
- Dragan Čadikovski (8/0)
- Dorian Babunski (7/0)
- Samir Fazli (7/0)
- Zoran Miserdovski (7/0)
- **Azer Omeragikj** (7/0)
- Darko Pančev (6/1) + YUG (27/17)
- Sašo Krstev (6/0)
- Risto Božinov (5/2)
- Arbën Nuhiji (5/2)
- Jurica Siljanoski (5/1)
- Aleksandar Bajevski (5/0)
- Ardijan Nuhiji (5/0)
- Dejvi Glavevski (4/3)
- Zoran Baldovaliev (4/1)
- Bajram Fetai (4/0)
- **Hristijan Maleski** (4/0)
- Goran Petreski (4/0)
- Goran Stankovski (4/0)
- Milko Gjurovski (3/0) + YUG (6/2)
- Ivica Gligorovski (3/0)
- Ismail Ismaili (3/0)
- Borče Manevski (3/0)
- Dejan Ristovski (3/0)
- Marko Simonovski (3/0)
- Muzafer Ejupi (2/0)
- Hristijan Kirovski (2/0)
- Mensur Kurtiši (2/0)
- Danny Musovski (2/0)
- Riste Naumov (2/0)
- Angelko Panov (2/0)
- Kristijan Trapanovski (2/0)
- Erdon Daci (1/1)
- Viktor Angelov (1/0)
- Darko Dodev (1/0)
- **Marko Gjorgjievski** (1/0)
- Mario Ilievski (1/0)
- David Toshevski (1/0)
- Zoran Zlatkovski (1/0)
