= 2013–14 FK Bregalnica Štip season =

Bregalnica Štip
2013–14 season
- Chairman: Vasil Kocev
- Manager: Dobrinko Ilievski
- Stadium: Gradski stadion Štip
- First League: 2nd
- Macedonian Cup: Second Round
- Top goalscorer: League: Aksentiev, Zdravkov (2); All: Aksentiev, Zdravkov (2)
- Highest home attendance: 3,000 vs Pelister; 25 August 2013
- Lowest home attendance: 2,500 vs Shkëndija; 11 August 2013
Home colours	Away colours

The 2013–14 season is FK Bregalnica Štip's 4th consecutive season in First League. This article shows player statistics and all official matches that the club will play during the 2013–14 season.

== Squad ==
As of 11 August 2013 Note: Flags indicate national team as defined under FIFA eligibility rules; some limited exceptions apply. Players may hold more than one non-FIFA nationality.

No.	Pos.	Nation	Player
—	GK	MKD	Daniel Božinovski
—	GK	MKD	Ljupčo Kolev
—	DF	MKD	Tomislav Blažeski
—	DF	MKD	Darko Božinov
—	DF	MKD	Sašo Gjoreski
—	DF	MKD	Nikola Mišovski
—	DF	MKD	Darko Stojanov
—	DF	MKD	Igor Stojanov
—	DF	MKD	Slavčo Velkoski

No.	Pos.	Nation	Player
—	MF	MKD	Eftim Aksentiev
—	MF	MKD	Gligor Gligorov
—	MF	MKD	Dragan Paunov
—	MF	BUL	Vasil Shopov
—	MF	MKD	Goran Zdravkov (captain)
—	FW	MKD	Lazar Iliev
—	FW	BIH	Boško Stupić

== Competitions ==
=== First League ===
==== Results summary ====
Overall								Home						Away					
Pld	W	D	L	GF	GA	GD	Pts	W	D	L	GF	GA	GD	W	D	L	GF	GA	GD
19	5	7	7	18	22	−4	22	2	6	0	10	6	+4	3	1	7	8	16	−8

==== Results ====
4 August 2013 1	Gostivar	0 – 1	Bregalnica Štip	Gostivar
18:00		Summary	Aksentiev 75'	Stadium: Gradski stadion Attendance: 2,500; Referee: Dimitar Mečkarovski (Skopje)

11 August 2013 2	Bregalnica Štip	1 – 1	Shkëndija	Štip
17:30	Zdravkov 15'	Summary	Maznov 70'	Stadium: Gradski stadion Attendance: 2,500; Referee: Zorančo Temelkov (Kavadarci)

18 August 2013 3	Napredok	0 – 2	Bregalnica Štip	Kičevo
17:30		Summary	Božinov 68'; Zdravkov 78'	Stadium: Gradski stadion Attendance: 1,500; Referee: Petar Mantev (Negotino)

25 August 2013 4	Bregalnica Štip	3 – 0	Pelister	Štip
17:00	Iliev 32'; Stojanov 64'; Aksentiev 90+'; Stupić (red card) 11'	Report		Stadium: Gradski stadion Attendance: 3,000; Referee: Dejan Jakimovski (Skopje)

28 August 2013 5	Vardar	1 – 0	Bregalnica Štip	Skopje
17:00	Ademović 16'; Bojović (yellow card) 87' (yellow-red card)	Report		Stadium: Philip II Arena; Attendance: 200; Referee: Josip Barton (Tetovo)

1 September 2013 6	Bregalnica Štip	0 – 0	Makedonija GjP	Štip
16:30				Stadium: Gradski stadion Referee: Marjan Markovski (Ohrid)

15 September 2013 7	Gorno Lisiče	0 – 3	Bregalnica Štip	Skopje
16:00	Trajče Stojkovski (yellow card); Boban Davčevski (yellow card)	Summary	Darko Stojanov (yellow card); Simeon Hristov (yellow card); Goran Zdravkov 67', 90+1'; Riste Naumov 72'	Stadium: Stadion Boris Trajkovski; Attendance: 300; Referee: (North Macedonia) Aleksandr Stavrev

22 September 2013 8	Bregalnica Štip	0 – 0	Renova	Štip
15:30	Doncho Argirovski (yellow card); Slavčo Velkoski (yellow card)	Summary	Memedi (yellow card); Ersen Sali (yellow card)	Stadium: Gradski stadion Štip; Attendance: 2,500; Referee: (North Macedonia) Marjan Markoski

28 September 2013 9	Turnovo	3 – 1	Bregalnica Štip	Turnovo
15:30	Blaževski (yellow card) (goal) 36' (pen.) 88'; Ejupi 51'; Dejan Mitrev (yellow card) 60' (yellow-red card)	Summary	Darko Božinov (yellow card); Darko Stojanov 45'; Aksentiev (yellow card)	Stadium: Stadion Kukuš; Attendance: 800; Referee: (North Macedonia) Marjan Eckoski

5 October 2013 10	Rabotnički	3 – 0	Bregalnica Štip	Skopje
15:00	Manevski 5'; Velkoski 12', 88'; Goran Siljanovski (yellow card)	Summary	Darko Stojanov (yellow card); Aksentiev (yellow card)	Stadium: Philip II Arena; Attendance: 200; Referee: (North Macedonia) Marjan Markoski

20 October 2013 11	Bregalnica Štip	0 – 0	Metalurg Skopje	Štip
14:00	Stojanov (yellow card)	Summary	Blagoja Ljamčevski (yellow card); Krstev (yellow card); Martin Šiškov (yellow card)	Stadium: Gradski stadion Attendance: 2,500; Referee: (North Macedonia) Marjan Eckoski

27 October 2013 12	Bregalnica Štip	2 – 1	Gostivar	Štip
13:00	Goran Zdravkov 2' (pen.); Vasil Shopov (yellow card); Riste Naumov 85'	Summary	Nikola Zerdeski (red card) 1'; Ekrem Hodžić (yellow card); Gjoko Cvetanovski (yellow card); Ester Deari 60'; Valon Neziri (yellow card)	Stadium: Gradski stadion Attendance: 2,000; Referee: (North Macedonia) Nikola Kostenchev

30 October 2013 13	Shkëndija	2 – 0	Bregalnica Štip	Tetovo
13:00	Jasir Selmani 13', 45'; Egzon Bejtulai (yellow card); Sakir Redzhepi (yellow card)	Summary	Daniel Božinovski (yellow card); Gligorov (yellow card)	Stadium: Gradski stadion Attendance: 3,000; Referee: (North Macedonia) Dalibor Gjorgjevski

3 November 2013 14	Bregalnica Štip	2 – 2	Napredok	Štip
13:00	Vasil Shopov (yellow card) (goal) 29'; Naumov 47'; Dusko Andonov (yellow card)	Summary	Daniel Veljanoski (yellow card); Toni Veljanovski (yellow card); Vladimir Mojsovski 43', 73'; Hristijan Dimoski (yellow card) 90' (yellow-red card); Đorđe Krkeljić (yellow card) 90' (yellow-red card)	Stadium: Gradski stadion Attendance: 2,000; Referee: (North Macedonia) Aleksandr Stavrev

10 November 2013 15	Pelister	1 – 0	Bregalnica Štip	Bitola
13:00	Elmazovski (yellow card); Hristijan Dragarski (yellow card); Hristov (yellow card) 40' (yellow-red card); Petar Ljamčevski (yellow card); Tomislav Blažeski 44' (o.g.)	Summary	Stojanov (yellow card) 40' (yellow-red card)	Stadium: Stadion Tumbe Kafe; Attendance: 2,000; Referee: (North Macedonia) Josip Barton

24 November 2013 16	Bregalnica Štip	1 – 1	Vardar	Štip
13:00	Stojanov (yellow card); Dusko Andonov (yellow card); Slavco Velkovski 34'; Goran Zdravkov (yellow card)	Summary	Aco Stojkov 15'; Cikarski (yellow card)	Stadium: Gradski stadion Attendance: 2,000; Referee: (North Macedonia) Aleksandr Stavrev

27 November 2013 17	Makedonija GjP	3 – 0	Bregalnica Štip	Skopje
13:00	Božinovski (yellow card); Filip Kolekeski 71'; Fahrudin Gjurgjevikj 78', 90'	Summary	Darko Bozhinov (yellow card); Lazar Iliev (yellow card)	Stadium: Gjorče Petrov Stadium; Attendance: 100; Referee: (North Macedonia) Petar Mantev

1 December 2013 18	Bregalnica Štip	1 – 1	Gorno Lisiče	Štip
13:00	Stupić (yellow card); Goran Zdravkov 80' (pen.)	Summary	Alen Jasharovski 36'; Marjan Mickov (yellow card) 30' (yellow-red card); Dejan Leskaroski (yellow card); Saa Illikj (yellow card)	Stadium: Gradski stadion Attendance: 1,000; Referee: (North Macedonia) Dimitar Mechkarovski

8 December 2013 19	Renova	3 – 1	Bregalnica Štip	Tetovo
13:00	Burim Sadiki (yellow card); Saimir Fetai (yellow card) (goal) 51'; Elmedin Rexhepi (yellow card) (goal) 65'; Memedi (yellow card) (goal) 68' (pen.)	Summary	Dusko Andonov (yellow card); Lazar Iliev 44'; Stupić (yellow card)	Stadium: Gradski stadion Attendance: 500; Referee: (North Macedonia) Konstantin Vlaho

2 March 2014 20	Bregalnica Štip	2 – 0	Turnovo	Štip
14:00	Aksentiev 3'; Stojanov (yellow card); Martin Shishkov (yellow card); Ivan Mitrov 71'	Summary	Tome Iliev (yellow card); Stefan Ristevski (yellow card); Pandev (red card) 68'	Stadium: Gradski stadion Attendance: 1,000; Referee: (North Macedonia) Dalibor Gjorgjevski

9 March 2014 21	Bregalnica Štip	1 – 1	Rabotnički	Štip
14:00	Gligorov (yellow card); Martin Shishkov (yellow card); Ivan Mitrov (yellow card); Riste Markoski 73'	Summary	Goran Siljanovski (yellow card); Dino Najdoski (yellow card) 20' (yellow-red card); Ilioski 85'	Stadium: Gradski stadion Attendance: 2,500; Referee: (North Macedonia) Aleksandr Stavrev

15 March 2014 22	Metalurg Skopje	1 – 2	Bregalnica Štip	Skopje
15:00	Blagojche Ljamchevski (yellow card); Ljubomir Stevanovic (yellow card); Zoran Vujović (yellow card) (goal) 30'; Marjan Radeski (yellow card)	Summary	Goran Zdravkov 8'; Lazar Iliev (yellow card); Ivan Mitrov (yellow card); Slavcho Velkovski (yellow card); Riste Markoski 78'	Stadium: Stadion Železarnica; Attendance: 100; Referee: (North Macedonia) Josip Barton

==== Table ====
Pos	Team	Pld	W	D	L	GF	GA	GD	Pts	Qualification or relegation
5	Vardar	33	15	11	7	55	32	+23	56	
6	Pelister	33	14	10	9	40	40	0	52	
7	Bregalnica Shtip	33	11	11	11	34	34	0	44	
8	Renova	33	10	14	9	42	46	−4	44	
9	Euromilk Gorno Lisiche (R)	33	9	12	12	34	37	−3	39	Relegation to Macedonian Second League

Source: MacedonianFootball.com
Rules for classification: 1) Points; 2) Goal difference; 3) Goals scored; 4) Head-to-head points; 5) Head-to-head goal difference; 6) Head-to-head away goals scored (only if two teams); 7) Head-to-head goals scored; 8) Draw; 9) Play-off. (Note: Criteria 2, 3 and 8 is only used if not deciding Champion, teams for UEFA competitions or relegation).
(R) Relegated

=== Macedonian Cup ===
22 August 2013 First Round	Sateska	0 – 3 Awarded	Bregalnica Štip	Ohrid
17:00				Stadium: Biljanini Izvori; Referee: Toni Mitrevski (Bitola)

18 September 2013 Second Round; First leg	Horizont Turnovo	1 – 0	Bregalnica Štip	Turnovo
16:00		Summary		Stadium: Stadion Kukuš

25 September 2013 Second Round; Second leg	Bregalnica Štip	1 – 0 (1 – 1 agg.) (3 - 0 p)	Horizont Turnovo	Štip
16:00		Summary		Stadium: Gradski stadion

12 October 2013 Quarter Final; First Leg	Bregalnica Štip	v	FK Shkëndija	Štip
14:00				Stadium: Gradski stadion

19 November 2013 Quarter Final; Second Leg	FK Shkëndija	v	Bregalnica Štip	Tetovo
				Stadium: Gradski stadion Tetovo

== Statistics ==
=== Top scorers ===
Rank	Name	League	Cup	Total
1	(North Macedonia) Eftim Aksentiev	2	–	2
1	(North Macedonia) Goran Zdravkov	2	–	2
3	(North Macedonia) Darko Božinov	1	–	1
3	(North Macedonia) Lazar Iliev	1	–	1
3	(North Macedonia) Darko Stojanov	1	–	1
	TOTALS	7	0	7
