= 2008–09 Macedonian First Football League =

Macedonian First League
- Season: 2008–09
- Dates: 3 August 2008 – 31 May 2009
- Champions: Makedonija G.P. 1st domestic title
- Relegated: Napredok
- Champions League: Makedonija G.P.
- Europa League: Milano; Renova; Rabotnichki
- Matches: 165
- Goals: 380 (2.3 per match)
- Top goalscorer: Ivica Gligorovski (14 goals)
- Biggest home win: Sileks 7–1 Napredok (16 November 2008)
- Biggest away win: Sileks 0–3 Metalurg (18 April 2009)
- Highest scoring: Sileks 7–1 Napredok (16 November 2008)

The 2008–09 Macedonian First League was the 17th season of the Macedonian First Football League, the highest football league of Macedonia. It began on 3 August 2008 and ended on 31 May 2009. Rabotnichki were the defending champions, having won their third title the previous year. Bashkimi withdrew from the championship due to financial reasons.

== Promotion and relegation ==
At the start of the 2008–09 season

Promoted from 2007–08 Second League

- Horizont Turnovo (winners)
- Metalurg Skopje (runners-up)

Relegated to 2008–09 Second League

- Shkëndija (11th)
- Cementarnica 55 (12th)
- Bashkimi (10th)^{1}

At the end of the 2008–09 season

Promoted from 2008–09 Second League

- Teteks (winners)
- Sloga Jugomagnat (runners-up)

Relegated to 2009–10 Second League

- Napredok (11th)

1 Bashkimi was withdraw from the First League due to financial reasons.

== Participating teams ==
Location of teams in 2008–09 Macedonian First League

Club	Manager	City	Stadium	Capacity
Makedonija G.P.	(North Macedonia) Ilcho Gjorgioski	Skopje	Stadion Gjorche Petrov	3,000
Metalurg	(North Macedonia) Gjore Jovanovski	Skopje	Stadion Zhelezarnica	4,000
Milano	(Kosovo) Bylbyl Sokoli	Kumanovo	Milano Arena	3,500
Napredok	(North Macedonia) Dragan Bocheski	Kichevo	Gradski stadion Kichevo	5,000
Pelister	(North Macedonia) Alekso Mackov	Bitola	Stadion Tumbe Kafe	8,000
Pobeda	(Serbia) Nebojša Petrović	Prilep	Stadion Goce Delchev	15,000
Rabotnichki	(North Macedonia) Boban Babunski	Skopje	Philip II Arena (Note: The stadium was called Gradski stadion Skopje until January 2009.)	18,104
Renova	(North Macedonia) Nexhat Shabani	Djepchishte	Gradski stadion Tetovo	15,000
Sileks	(North Macedonia) Marjan Sekulovski	Kratovo	Stadion Sileks	5,000
Horizont Turnovo	(North Macedonia) Dragan Hristovski	Turnovo	Stadion Kukush	1,500
Vardar	(North Macedonia) Zhikica Tasevski	Skopje	Philip II Arena	18,104

== League table ==
Pos	Team	Pld	W	D	L	GF	GA	GD	Pts	Qualification or relegation
1	Makedonija G.P. (C)	30	17	10	3	46	15	+31	61	Qualification for the Champions League second qualifying round
2	Milano	30	17	4	9	48	35	+13	55	Qualification for the Europa League second qualifying round
3	Renova	30	14	12	4	41	26	+15	54	Qualification for the Europa League first qualifying round
4	Rabotnichki	30	13	8	9	40	25	+15	47	Qualification for the Europa League second qualifying round (Note: Rabotnichki qualified for the Europa League second qualifying round by winning the 2008–09 Macedonian Football Cup.)
5	Vardar	30	11	12	7	35	23	+12	45	
6	Horizont Turnovo	30	9	10	11	25	39	−14	37	
7	Sileks	30	9	9	12	38	41	−3	36	
8	Pobeda	30	8	8	14	31	47	−16	32	
9	Metalurg (O)	30	6	11	13	25	35	−10	29	Qualification for the relegation playoff
10	Pelister (O)	30	7	7	16	25	42	−17	28	Qualification for the relegation playoff
11	Napredok (R)	30	4	9	17	26	52	−26	21	Relegation to the Macedonian Second League
–	Bashkimi (Note: Bashkimi withdrew their participation prior to the start of the season due to financial problems.) (D, R)	0	0	0	0	0	0	0	0	Banned from the Macedonian Second League

Source: MacedonianFootball.com, RSSSF.org
Rules for classification: 1) Points; 2) Goal difference; 3) Goals scored; 4) Head-to-head points; 5) Head-to-head goal difference; 6) Head-to-head away goals scored (only if two teams); 7) Head-to-head goals scored; 8) Draw; 9) Play-off. (Note: Criteria 2, 3 and 8 is only used if not deciding Champion, teams for UEFA competitions or relegation).
(C) Champions; (D) Disqualified; (O) Play-off winners; (R) Relegated

== Results ==
The schedule consists of three rounds. During the first two rounds, each team played each other once home and away for a total of 20 matches. The pairings of the third round were then set according to the standings after the first two rounds, giving every team a third game against each opponent for a total of 30 games per team.

Home \ Away	MGP	MET	MIL	NAP	PEL	POB	RAB	REN	SIL	TUR	VAR	MGP	MET	MIL	NAP	PEL	POB	RAB	REN	SIL	TUR	VAR
Makedonija	—	2–0	0–0	1–0	2–0	5–0	2–0	1–1	4–1	4–0	1–0	—	—	—	—	0–0	3–0	—	1–1	2–0	1–0	0–0
Metalurg	0–1	—	0–1	0–0	1–0	2–1	0–1	1–1	2–0	1–1	1–1	1–1	—	0–1	1–0	—	—	0–1	—	—	—	—
Milano	1–0	2–1	—	5–0	3–0	5–2	1–0	3–1	1–0	3–0	1–3	2–0	—	—	—	4–1	3–1	—	—	3–2	1–2	1–0
Napredok	1–0	1–2	3–1	—	3–1	2–0	1–1	1–2	1–1	0–0	1–1	1–1	—	1–1	—	—	1–1	0–1	—	—	—	—
Pelister	0–2	2–0	2–0	1–0	—	0–1	1–1	0–1	3–1	3–1	0–0	—	2–2	—	3–1	—	—	—	1–0	—	2–2	0–0
Pobeda	1–2	3–1	0–0	1–0	2–0	—	0–0	0–1	1–2	2–1	0–0	—	1–1	—	—	2–1	—	—	2–2	—	2–0	1–1
Rabotnichki	3–3	1–0	4–0	1–1	3–0	2–2	—	1–3	3–0	4–1	2–0	0–1	—	2–0	—	2–0	2–0	—	—	1–2	3–1	—
Renova	0–3 (Note: The match of Round 8 was awarded to Makedonija Gjorče Petrov after it was interrupted in 45th minute due to Renova's fans attacking Makedonija's midfielder Georges Ambourouet.)	1–1	1–0	1–0	3–1	2–1	1–0	—	0–0	1–0	1–1	—	4–0	4–1	3–0	—	—	1–0	—	2–2	—	—
Sileks	1–1	2–2	0–0	7–1	1–0	2–1	0–0	1–1	—	4–0	0–0	—	0–3	—	4–2	1–0	2–3	—	—	—	—	—
Horizont Turnovo	1–1	1–0	2–0	3–2	0–0	1–0	0–0	0–0	1–0	—	1–0	—	1–1	—	2–0		—	—	1–1	1–0	—	1–1
Vardar	0–1	1–1	2–4	4–2	3–0	3–0	2–1	3–1	2–0	2–0	—	—	1–0	—	2–0	—	—	2–0	0–0	0–2	—	—

Source: MacedonianFootball.com
Legend: Blue = home team win; Yellow = draw; Red = away team win.

== Relegation playoff ==
13 June 2009
16:30 CEST

Metalurg	5–1	Bregalnica Shtip
Đurić 10'; Ilijoski 15', 75'; Mihajlović 79'; Velkoski 89'		Novakov 55'

Stadion Goce Delchev, Prilep
Referee: Goran Spirkoski (Prilep)

13 June 2009
16:30 CEST

Pelister	3–0	Shkëndija 79
Glavevski 64', 68'; Dimitrovski 85'

Stadion Mladost, Strumica
Referee: Vladimir Kiprijanovski (Skopje)

== Top goalscorers ==
Rank	Player	Club	Goals
1	(North Macedonia) Ivica Gligorovski	Milano	14
2	(North Macedonia) Besart Ibraimi	Renova	13
3	(Bosnia and Herzegovina) Boško Stupić	Sileks	12
4	(Brazil) César de Brito	Makedonija G.P.	11
4	(North Macedonia) Blagoj Levkov	Napredok	11
6	(North Macedonia) Boban Janchevski	Vardar	10
7	(North Macedonia) Dragan Dimitrovski	Pelister	9
8	(North Macedonia) Blagoja Geshoski	Milano	8
8	(North Macedonia) Gligor Gligorov	Sileks	8
8	(North Macedonia) Hristijan Kirovski	Rabotnichki	8
8	(Brazil) Washington	Makedonija G.P.	8

Source: Macedonian Football (in English)

== See also ==
- 2008–09 Macedonian Football Cup
- 2008–09 Macedonian Second Football League
