= Daniel Mojsov =

Macedonian footballer

Personal information
- Full name: Daniel Mojsov
- Date of birth: 25 December 1987 (age 38)
- Place of birth: Kavadarci, SFR Yugoslavia
- Height: 1.90 m (6 ft 3 in)
- Position: Centre back

Team information
- Current team: Tikvesh
- Number: 5

Youth career
- Tikvesh

Senior career*
Years	Team	Apps	(Gls)
2005–2006	Tikvesh	21	(1)
2006–2010	Makedonija	70	(5)
2010	Vardar	7	(0)
2010–2012	Vojvodina	55	(4)
2013–2014	Brann	29	(3)
2015	Lierse	13	(1)
2015	Adana Demirspor	9	(2)
2016–2021	AEK Larnaca	108	(5)
2021–2023	Bregalnica	42	(1)
2023–	Tikvesh	68	(2)

International career^{‡}
2007–2008	Macedonia U21	5	(0)
2008–2017	Macedonia	39	(0)
- * Club domestic league appearances and goals as of 1 June 2026 ‡ National team caps and goals as of 11 June 2017

Daniel Mojsov (Macedonian: Даниел Мојсов; born 25 December 1987) is a Macedonian professional footballer who plays as a centre back for Tikvesh.

== Club career ==
After starting his career with FK Tikvesh, he played with FK Makedonija Gjorče Petrov and FK Vardar in Macedonian First League before moving to FK Vojvodina.

=== Makedonija Gjorče Petrov ===
It was in the 2006-07 season that he made his debut in the First Macedonian Football League with FK Makedonija Gjorče Petrov after signing from FK Tikvesh. He immediately made an impact in the squad and in the next season he became a key defensive player of the ambitious team. His 28 league appearances with 2 goals made his earn a call for the national team while he was still only 20 years old. His impressive displays in the league continued in the following season, 2008–09, the one in which FK Makedonija conquered its first and only championship. As key defensive player, Mojsov was one of the major contributors for that great season, and his club finished as the less beaten defence, conceding only 15 goals in 30 matches.

=== Vardar ===
In the following season, 2009–10 FK Makedonija experienced major difficulties and ended up being suspended in the league. Despite everything, Mojsov continued his top form displays and during the winter break Serbian club FK Vojvodina had him as their major target for the transfer window. However, due to bureaucratic problems, Mojsov would have to wait for the summer to join his new club and in the meantime he stayed in his home country and play the rest of the season with FK Vardar, the domestic powerhouse.

=== Vojvodina ===
During summer 2010 he finally moved to FK Vojvodina. Along his new teammates there was another Macedonian national team player, Mario Gjurovski. During his first season, 2010–11, he made 21 appearances in the Serbian SuperLiga becoming, again, a key player in the center of the defense. Vojvodina finished third in the league, and they reached the 2010–11 Serbian Cup final in which Mojsov scored his team only goal (the second from him was withdrawn). However, the cup final was interrupted at 83rd minute (result 2–1 for Partizan) due to refusal of Vojvodina to continue playing and they abandoned the match in protest against several referee decisions during the match. In result, Partizan was awarded with a 3–0 win.

At the end of the season, Mojsov was elected for the 2010–11 Serbian SuperLiga Team of the Season, along with Montenegrin international and Partizan player Stefan Savić (now Fiorentina) as the two best central defenders. During the summer of 2011, Mojsov was among the Serbian SuperLiga players with the most interest from both, other top domestic clubs, and from abroad, however after much speculation Mojsov stayed with Vojvodina for the 2011–12 Serbian SuperLiga season.

=== Brann ===
As a free agent, Mojsov signed a contract with the Norwegian Tippeligaen side Brann in May 2013. He had to wait for the transfer window to open before he made his debut in the 1–4 loss against Rosenborg at home on 28 July 2013.

=== Lierse ===
On 7 January 2015 he signed with Lierse.

=== Adana Demirspor ===
On 3 June 2015, Mojsov joined to Turkish club Adana Demirspor.

== International career ==
Mojsov was already a Macedonian under-21 international when he made his debut for the Macedonia national football team as a second-half substitute in a friendly against Montenegro on 19 November 2008. Since then, Mojsov had been a regular in the national team. He has earned a total of 39 caps, scoring no goals and his final international was a June 2017 FIFA World Cup qualification match against Spain.

== Honours ==
=== Club ===
Makedonija Gjorče Petrov

- Macedonian First League: 2008–09

Vojvodina

- Serbian Cup runner-up: 2010–11

AEK Larnaca

- Cypriot Cup: 2017–18
- Cypriot Super Cup: 2018

Tikvesh

- Macedonian Cup: 2023–24

Individual:

- 2010–11 Serbian SuperLiga Team of the season
