= Taleski =

Taleski is a surname. Notable people with the surname include:

- Davor Taleski (born 1995), Macedonian footballer
- Filip Taleski (born 1996), Macedonian handballer
