= Boban Jančevski =

Macedonian retired football striker (born 1978)

Personal information
- Full name: Boban Jančevski-Janker; Бобан Јанчевски - Јанкер
- Date of birth: 30 April 1978 (age 48)
- Place of birth: Vienna, Austria
- Height: 1.90 m (6 ft 3 in)
- Position: Striker

Youth career
- Teteks

Senior career*
Years	Team	Apps	(Gls)
	Teteks	1	(0)
2002–2003	Tikvesh	5	(1)
2003–2005	Lokomotiv Plovdiv	66	(19)
2005	Bashkimi	16	(7)
2006–2007	Renova	18	(19)
2007–2008	Lokeren	5	(1)
2008	Rabotnički	19	(5)
2008–2009	Vardar	26	(10)
2009–2013	Renova	89	(37)
2013–2014	Makedonija	23	(6)
2015	Ljubanci		
2015-2016	Makedonija		
2016	Teteks		
- * Club domestic league appearances and goals as of 15 July 2014

Boban Jančevski - Janker (Macedonian: Бобан Јанчевски - Јанкер) (born 30 April 1978, Vienna, Austria) is a Macedonian retired football striker who last played for FK Teteks in the Macedonian Second League.

== Club career ==
Boban grew up in the village of Rogačevo, in the Tetovo multiplicity where he worked his way up in the local academies. The experienced striker is known for his powerful shots, pace, and his ability to score. Jancevski wears the number 9.

== Awards ==
- PFC Lokomotiv Plovdiv
  - Bulgarian A Professional Football Group: 1
    - Winner: 2003–04
- FK Bashkimi Kumanovo
  - Macedonian Cup: 1
    - Winner: 2005
- FK Rabotnički Skopje
  - First Macedonian Football League: 1
    - Winner: 2007–08
  - Macedonian Cup: 1
    - Winner: 2007–08
- FK Renova Dzepciste
  - First Macedonian Football League: 1
    - Winner: 2009–10
