= Dragan Veselinovski =

Macedonian retired football player (born 1968)

Personal information
- Full name: Dragan Veselinovski
- Date of birth: 11 August 1968 (age 58)
- Place of birth: Bitola, SR Macedonia, SFR Yugoslavia
- Position: Defender

Senior career*
Years	Team	Apps	(Gls)
1988–1990	Pelister	63	(2)
1990–1991	Vardar	15	(0)
1991–1995	Pelister	85	(1+)
1995–1999	Sileks	41+	(0)
1999–2000	Makedonija	20	(1)
2000–2004	Vardar	106	(0)
2004–2006	Renova	31	
2006–2007	Drita		

International career^{‡}
1995–2001	Macedonia	20	(0)
- * Club domestic league appearances and goals as of 14 August 2010 ‡ National team caps and goals as of 11 August 2010

Dragan Veselinovski (Macedonian: Драган Веселиновски; born 11 August 1968 in Bitola) is a Macedonian retired football player.

== Club career ==
He captained Vardar in the Champions League.

== International career ==
He made his senior debut for Macedonia in an August 1995 friendly match away against Turkey and has earned a total of 20 caps, scoring no goals. His final international was an August 2001 friendly against Saudi Arabia.
