= Argjent Gafuri =

Macedonian footballer (born 1989)

Personal information
- Date of birth: 1 February 1989 (age 37)
- Place of birth: Novi Pazar, SFR Yugoslavia
- Height: 1.83 m (6 ft 0 in)
- Position: Midfielder

Team information
- Current team: Arsimi

Youth career
- Joshanica

Senior career*
Years	Team	Apps	(Gls)
2007–2018	Renova	225	(36)
2018	→ Flamurtari Vlorë (loan)	0	(0)
2018–2022	Renova	72	(6)
2022	Voska Sport		
2022–	Arsimi	29+	(1+)

International career
2008	Macedonia U21	1	(0)
- * Club domestic league appearances and goals as of 11 May 2026

Argjent Gafuri (born 1 February 1989) is a Macedonian professional footballer who plays as a midfielder for KF Arsimi. Born in Novi Pazar, he represented North Macedonia internationally. With over 300 games for KF Renova, he is the most capped player in the history of the club.

== Honours ==
Renova

- Macedonian First Football League: 2009–10
- Macedonian Football Cup: 2011–12
