= Gjorgji Todorovski =

Association football player

Gjorgji Todorovski (Ѓорѓи Тодоровски – Џони)
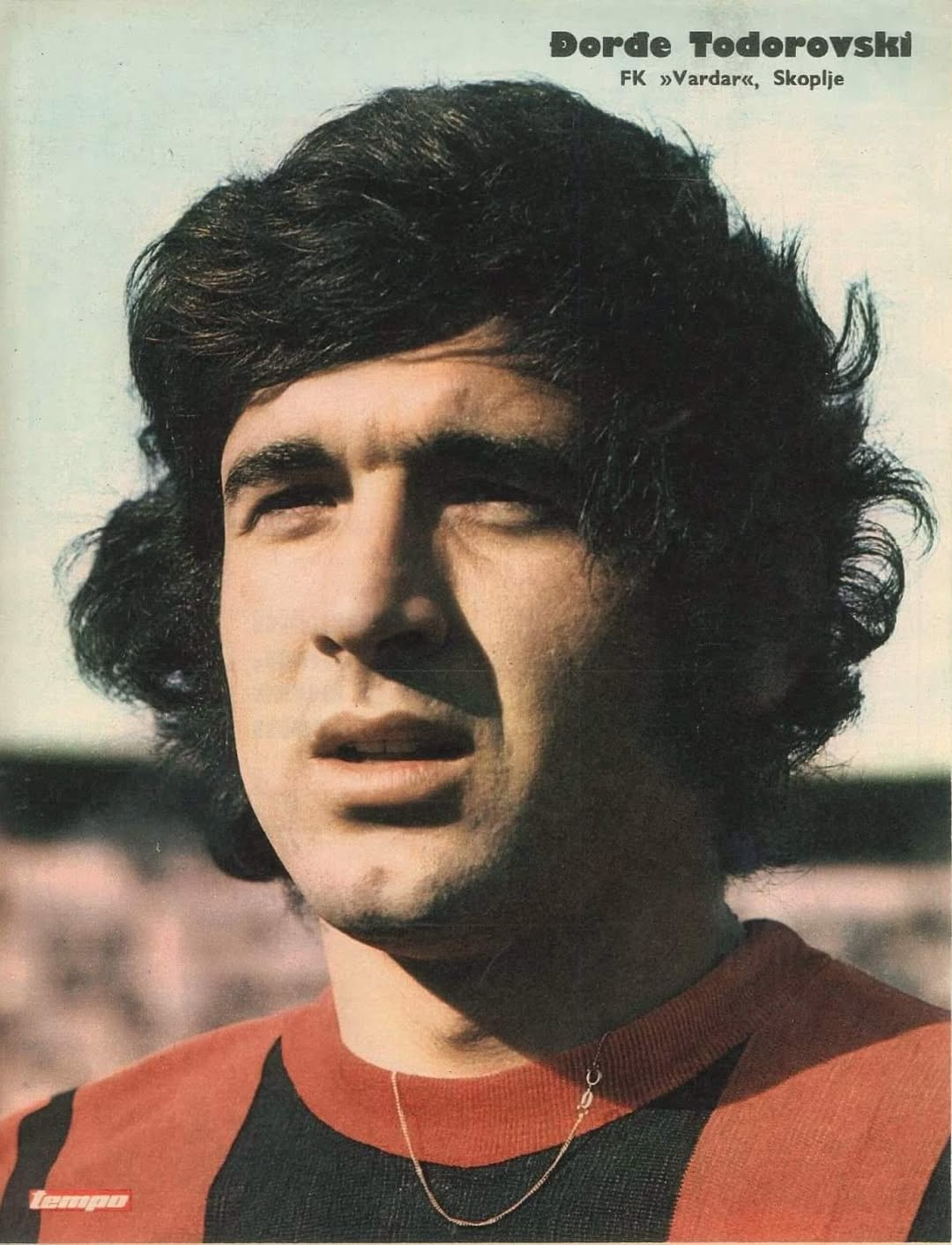

Personal information
- Date of birth: 19 February 1955 (age 71)
- Place of birth: Belgrade, FPR Yugoslavia
- Height: 1.85 m (6 ft 1 in)
- Position: Defender

Youth career
- 1970–1973: FK Vardar Skopje

Senior career*
Years	Team	Apps	(Gls)
1973–1981	FK Vardar Skopje	300	(11)
1982–1984	Preston Makedonia Australia	36	(0)
1984–1985	Teteks		

International career
1975/76	Yugoslavia U-21/23	2	(0)

Managerial career
- 2005–2006: Makedonija Gjorce Petrov
- 2010: FK Vardar Skopje
- 2011–2012: Horizont Turnovo
- 2012–2013: Teteks
- 2014: Makedonija Gjorce Petrov
- * Club domestic league appearances and goals

Gjorgji Todorovski ^{[a]} (Macedonian: Ѓopѓи Тодоровски Џони; born 19 February 1955) is a Macedonian football manager and former professional football player.

== Playing career ==
=== Club ===
Gjorgji Todorovski began his career in the youth ranks of FK Vardar a prominent football club competing in the Yugoslav First League.

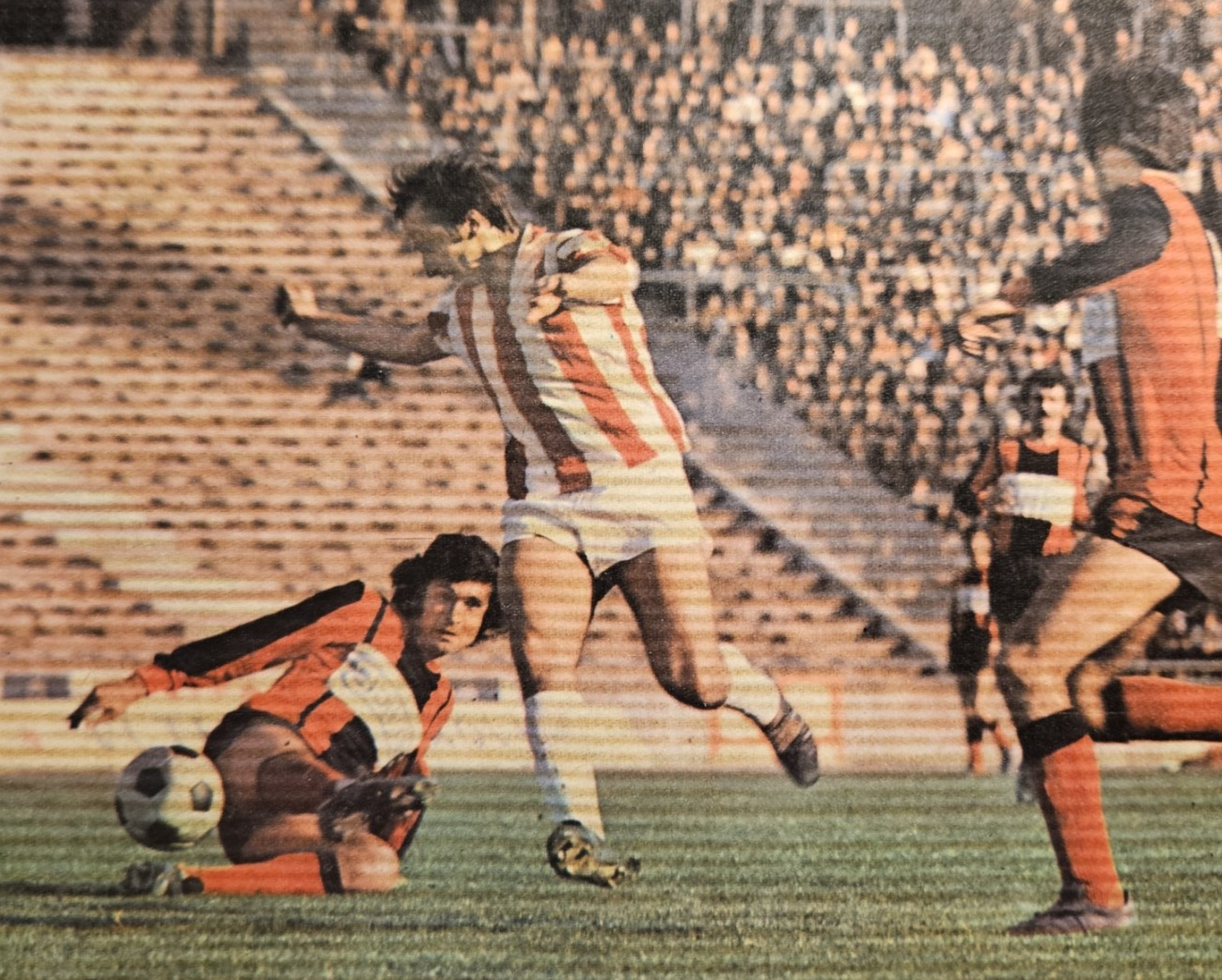
Todorovski (left) in a sliding tackle against Red Star Belgrade's Jovan Aćimović during a 1975 match.

He made his senior debut for the club during the 1973/74 season, at the age of 18. One of the most memorable games of his career was the decisive 2–1 victory against FK Trepca in 1979.] Played in Skopje before an enthusiastic crowd of 30,000 fans, this win secured Vardar's return to the Yugoslav First Division after a three-year absence. He went on to make over 300 appearances and remained with the club until 1982.

At the age of 27, he then moved to Australia and joined Preston Makedonia in 1982, playing two seasons and making 36 appearances in the Australian National Soccer League currently known as the A-League

=== International ===
Todorovski represented Yugoslavia in the 1976 UEFA European Under-23 Championship. He made his debut on 5 June 1975 in a group stage match against Sweden, which ended in a 1–1 draw in Kramfors. The team advanced through the group stage and the quarter-finals before being eliminated in the semi-finals by Hungary. The Soviet Union went on to win the competition

== Managerial career ==
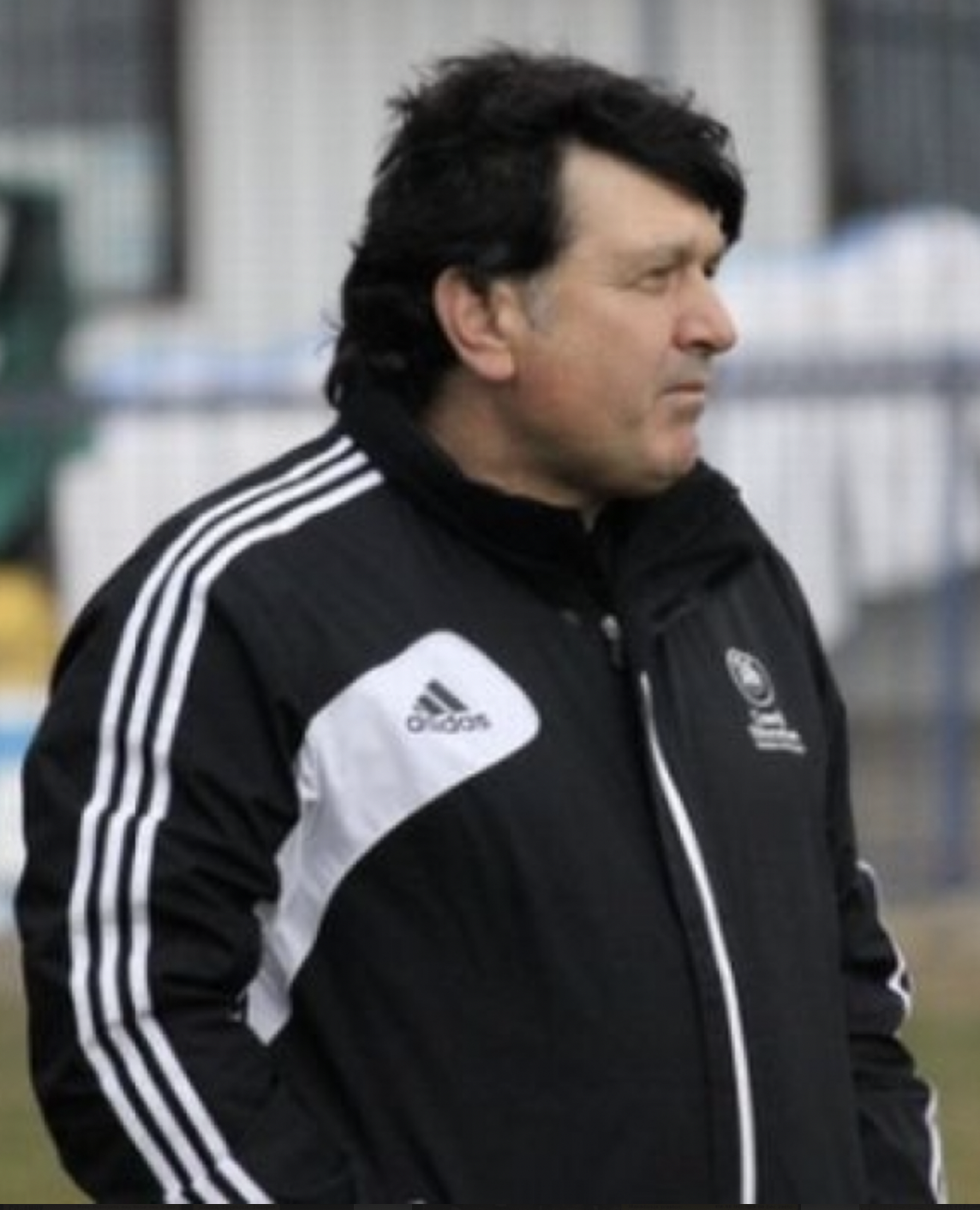
Gjorgji Todorovski

Gjorgji Todorovski began his coaching career as an assistant, where he achieved early success. In 2006, while serving as the assistant coach for Makedonija Gjorce Petrov. He was part of the coaching staff that led the club to victory in the Macedonian Football Cup. This achievement marked a significant moment in the club's history.

In the following years he transitioned into head coaching roles, taking charge of several teams in the Macedonian First Football League. He served as the head coach for prominent clubs such as FK Vardar, FK Horizont Turnovo, and FK Teteks, guiding these teams through their respective campaigns.

In 2011, he further solidified his credentials by successfully completing the program to earn his UEFA Pro Licence, the highest coaching qualification recognized in Europe. This license qualifies him to manage clubs in top-level European leagues and national teams.

== Honours ==
- FK Makedonija Gorce Petrov

Macedonian Football Cup: 2005–06

== Notes ==
a.
Macedonian spelling: Ǵorǵi Todorovski, Ѓopѓи Тодоровски, Romanized spelling: Đorđe Тодоровски.

English George Todorovski
