= Marjan Stojkovski =

Macedonian footballer

Personal information
- Full name: Marjan Stojkovski; Марјан Стојковски
- Date of birth: 7 July 1965 (age 61)
- Position: Midfielder

Senior career*
Years	Team	Apps	(Gls)
1992-1994	Pobeda		
1994-1995	Makedonija		
1995-1996	Vardar		
2000-2001	Pobeda		

International career
1994–1995	Macedonia	4	(1)
- * Club domestic league appearances and goals

Marjan Stojkovski (Macedonian: Марјан Стојковски; born 7 July 1965) is a retired Macedonian football midfielder.

== International career ==
He made his senior debut for Macedonia in a May 1994 friendly match against Albania in which he immediately scored, and has earned a total of 4 caps, scoring 1 goal. His final international was an April 1995 European Championship qualification match against Denmark.

== External sources ==
- Marjan Stojkovski at National-Football-Teams.com
