= Gilson (footballer, born 1973) =

Brazilian-Macedonian footballer

Personal information
- Full name: Gilson Jesus da Silva
- Date of birth: 12 June 1973 (age 53)
- Place of birth: São Paulo, Brazil
- Height: 1.74 m (5 ft 9 in)
- Position: Midfielder

Senior career*
Years	Team	Apps	(Gls)
1999–2005	Pobeda	154	(26)
2005–2007	Kastoria	63	(2)
2007	Pobeda		
2008	Besëlidhja	15	(5)

International career
2006	Macedonia	1	(0)
- * Club domestic league appearances and goals

Gilson Jesus da Silva (born 12 June 1973), known as Gilson (Macedonian: Жилсон), is a Brazilian-born naturalized Macedonian retired footballer.

== Club career ==
He played for many seasons with FK Pobeda in the Macedonian First League. He also had spells with Kastoria F.C. in Greek Beta Ethniki and KF Besëlidhja Lezhë in Albanian Superliga.

== International career ==
He played one match for the Macedonian national team, coming on as a second-half substitute for Vulnet Emini in a 1–0 victory over Turkey in a friendly match played on 4 June 2006.

== Honours ==
Pobeda

- Macedonian First League: 2003–04
- Macedonian Cup: 2001–02

Individual

- Macedonian First League best foreign player: 2004
