= Jordančo Stojmenovski =

Macedonian footballer

Personal information
- Date of birth: 11 March 1978 (age 48)
- Position: Defender

Senior career*
Years	Team	Apps	(Gls)
-2001	Makedonija GP		
2001-2002	FK Pelister		
2003-2006	KF Bashkimi		
2008-2013	FK Belasica		

International career
2001	Macedonia	1	(0)
- * Club domestic league appearances and goals

Jordančo Stojmenovski (born 11 March 1978) is a retired Macedonian football defender.
