= 2009–10 Macedonian Football Cup =

Tournament details
- Country: Macedonia
- Dates: 18 August 2009 – 26 May 2010
- Teams: 32

Final positions
- Champions: Teteks (1st title)
- Runners-up: Rabotnichki

Tournament statistics
- Matches played: 38
- Goals scored: 117 (3.08 per match)

The 2009–10 Macedonian Football Cup was the 18th season of Macedonia's football knockout competition. Rabotnichki were the defending champions, having won their second title. The 2009–10 champions were Teteks who won their first title.

== Competition calendar ==
Round	Date(s)	Fixtures	Clubs	New entries
First Round	26 August 2009	16	32 → 16	32
Second Round	22, 23, 29, 30 September 2009	16	16 → 8	none
Quarter-finals	28 October & 25 November 2009	8	8 → 4	none
Semi-finals	7 April & 5 May 2010	4	4 → 2	none
Final	26 May 2010	1	2 → 1	none

== Preliminary round ==
Team 1	Score	Team 2
Teteks (1)	3–0 (w/o)	Shkëndija 79 (2)

== First round ==
The draw was held on 28 June 2009 in Skopje. Matches were played on 26 August 2009.

Team 1	Score	Team 2
26 August 2009
Gostivar (x)	0–3 (w/o)	Lokomotiva (2)
11 Oktomvri (2)	3–1	Vardar (1)
Mirche Acev (3)	0–11	Renova (1)
Bregalnica Delchevo (3)	0–2	Pobeda (1)
Belasica (2)	3–1	Milano (1)
Prevalec (3)	0–4	Teteks (1)
Skopje (2)	2–1	Sloga Jugomagnat (1)
Ohrid 2004 (2)	3–0	Horizont Turnovo (1)
Dobrushevo (3)	1–13	Sileks (1)
Vëllazërimi (2)	0–3	Pelister (1)
Babuna (3)	1–3	Metalurg (1)
Vlaznimi (2)	0–0 (4–3 p)	Bregalnica 2008 (2)
Kozhuf (3)	0–5	Rabotnichki (1)
Drita (2)	1–0	Napredok (2)
Karbinci (2)	1–4	Makedonija G.P. (1)
Lepenec (3)	0–3 (w/o)	Fortuna (3)

== Second round ==
The draw was held on 16 September 2009 in Skopje. The first legs were played on 22 and 23 September 2009 and second were played on 29 and 30 September 2009.

Team 1	Agg.	Team 2	1st leg	2nd leg
Pelister (1)	5–0^{1}	Ohrid 2004 (2)	2–0	3–0 (w/o)
Lokomotiva (2)	0–6^{1}	Renova (1)	0–3 (w/o)	0–3 (w/o)
Metalurg (1)	1–1 (4–3 p)	Pobeda (1)	1–0	0–1
Vlaznimi (2)	1–2	Drita (2)	0–1	1–1
Belasica (2)	1–4	Teteks (1)	1–3	0–1
Fortuna (3)	0–9^{1}	Rabotnichki (1)	0–6	0–3 (w/o)
Skopje (2)	3–2	11 Oktomvri (2)	3–1	0–1
Sileks (1)	2–3	Makedonija G.P. (1)	1–1	1–2

^{1} Ohrid, Lokomotiva and Fortuna withdrew their participations due to financial problems.

== Quarter-finals ==
The draw was held on 20 October 2009 in Skopje. The first legs were played on 28 October 2009 and second were played on 25 November 2009.

=== Summary ===
Team 1	Agg.	Team 2	1st leg	2nd leg
Skopje (2)	(a) 2–2	Metalurg (1)	0–0	2–2
Rabotnichki (1)	5–0	Renova (1)	4–0	1–0
Makedonija G.P. (1)	2–3	Teteks (1)	2–0	0–3 (w/o)
Pelister (1)	3–2	Drita (2)	2–2	1–0

=== Matches ===
28 October 2009
14:00 CEST

Skopje (2)	0–0	Metalurg (1)

Stadion Avtokomanda, Skopje
25 November 2009
13:00 CET

Metalurg (1)	2–2	Skopje (2)
Ilijoski 4'; Krstev 6'		Mojsov 10'; Donev 90+3'

Stadion Zhelezarnica, Skopje

2–2 on aggregate. Skopje won on away goals.

28 October 2009
14:00 CEST

Rabotnichki (1)	4–0	Renova (1)
Wandeir 38' (pen.); Bojović 45'; Gligorov 77'; Petkovski 90'

Philip II Arena, Skopje
25 November 2009
13:00 CET

Renova (1)	0–1	Rabotnichki (1)
		Gligorov 59'

Gradski stadion, Tetovo

Rabotnichki won 5–0 on aggregate.

28 October 2009
14:00 CEST

Makedonija G.P. (1)	2–0	Teteks (1)
Brnjarchevski 63'; Ilievski 65'

Gjorche Petrov Stadium, Skopje
26 November 2009
13:00 CET

Teteks (1)	3–0 (Awarded)	Makedonija G.P. (1)

Gradski stadion, Tetovo

Teteks won 3–2 on aggregate.

28 October 2009
14:00 CEST

Pelister (1)	2–2	Drita (2)
Klechkarovski 7'; Ganchev 87'		Aliji 56'; Ramadani 77'

Stadion Tumbe Kafe, Bitola
25 November 2009
13:00 CET

Drita (2)	0–1	Pelister (1)
		Dimitrovski 45'

Stadion Bogovinje, Bogovinje

Pelister won 3–2 on aggregate.

== Semi-finals ==
The draw was held on 8 December 2009 in Skopje. The first legs were played on 7 April 2010 and the second on 5 May 2010.

=== Summary ===
Team 1	Agg.	Team 2	1st leg	2nd leg
Pelister (1)	1–1 (4–5 p)	Rabotnichki (1)	1–0	0–1
Teteks (1)	2–1	Skopje (2)	0–0	2–1

=== Matches ===
7 April 2010
16:00 CEST

Pelister (1)	1−0	Rabotnichki (1)
Veljanovski 8'

Stadion Tumbe Kafe, Bitola
Attendance: 500
Referee: Marjan Eckoski (Ohrid)
5 May 2010
16:30 CEST

Rabotnichki (1)	1−0	Pelister (1)
Bojović 38'
Penalties
Gligorov (penalty scored); Dimovski (penalty scored); B. Bozhinovski (penalty scored); Marcio (penalty scored); Fernando (penalty scored)	5–4	(penalty missed) Altiparmakovski; (penalty scored) Ljamchevski; (penalty scored) Brdarovski; (penalty scored) Stefanović; (penalty scored) Simonovski

Philip II Arena, Skopje
Attendance: 2,000
Referee: Marjan Eckoski (Ohrid)

1–1 on aggregate. Rabotnichki won 5–4 in penalty shootout.

7 April 2010
16:00 CEST

Teteks (1)	0−0	Skopje (2)

Gradski stadion, Tetovo
5 May 2010
16:30 CEST

Skopje (2)	1−2	Teteks (1)
Mojsovski 89'		Radonjić 14'; Ristovski 40'

Stadion Avtokomanda, Skopje

Teteks won 2–1 on aggregate.

== Final ==
26 May 2010
16:00 CEST

Rabotnichki (1)	2–3	Teteks (1)
Gligorov 69'; Petkovski 82'	Report 1 Report 2	Zaharievski 47' (pen.); Iseni 49'; Stojanovski 64'

Philip II Arena, Skopje
Attendance: 4,000
Referee: Vladimir Kiprijanovski (Skopje)

== See also ==
- 2009–10 Macedonian First Football League
- 2009–10 Macedonian Second Football League
