= 2009–10 Macedonian First Football League =

Macedonian First League
- Season: 2009–10
- Dates: 1 August 2009 – 19 May 2010
- Champions: Renova; 1st domestic title
- Relegated: Makedonija G.P. Milano; Pobeda; Sloga Jugomagnat
- Champions League: Renova
- Europa League: Rabotnichki; Metalurg; Teteks
- Matches: 117
- Goals: 310 (2.65 per match)
- Top goalscorer: Bobi Bozhinovski (15 goals)
- Biggest home win: Makedonija 8–0 Milano (26 September 2009)
- Biggest away win: Sileks 0–5 Renova (18 October 2009)
- Highest scoring: Makedonija 8–0 Milano (26 September 2009)

The 2009–10 Macedonian First League was the 18th season of the Macedonian First Football League, the highest football league of Macedonia. It began on 1 August 2009 and ended on 19 May 2010. Makedonija G.P. were the defending champions having won their first Macedonian championship last season.

== Promotion and relegation ==
At the start of the 2009–10 season

Promoted from 2008–09 Second League

- Teteks (winners)
- Sloga Jugomagnat (runners-up)

Relegated to 2009–10 Second League

- Napredok (11th)

At the end of the 2009–10 season

Promoted from 2009–10 Second League

- Shkëndija (winners)
- Skopje (runners-up)
- Napredok (Third placed)^{1}
- Bregalnica Shtip (Fourth placed; won play-off match)

Relegated to 2010–11 Second League

- Milano (11th; lost play-off match)
- Makedonija G.P. (9th)^{1}
- Sloga Jugomagnat (10th)^{1}
- Pobeda (12th)^{2}

1 Makedonija G.P. and Sloga Jugomagnat were expelled from the First League due to boycotting two matches in the season. However, Napredok was directly promoted.
2 Pobeda was expelled from the First League due to the eight-year suspension from FIFA for their involvement in match-fixing scandal.

== Participating teams ==
Location of teams in 2009–10 Macedonian First League

Club	Manager	City	Stadium	Capacity
Makedonija G.P.	(North Macedonia) Ilcho Gjorgioski	Skopje	Stadion Gjorche Petrov	3,000
Metalurg Skopje	(North Macedonia) Zhikica Tasevski	Skopje	Stadion Zhelezarnica	4,000
Milano	(Kosovo) Bylbyl Sokoli	Kumanovo	Milano Arena	3,500
Pelister	(North Macedonia) Naum Ljamchevski	Bitola	Stadion Tumbe Kafe	8,000
Pobeda	(North Macedonia) Goran Todoroski	Prilep	Stadion Goce Delchev	15,000
Rabotnichki	(North Macedonia) Zoran Stratev	Skopje	Philip II Arena	25,000
Renova	(North Macedonia) Nexhat Shabani	Djepchishte	Gradski stadion Tetovo	15,000
Sileks	(North Macedonia) Ane Andovski	Kratovo	Stadion Sileks	5,000
Sloga Jugomagnat	(North Macedonia) Mensur Nexhipi	Skopje	Chair Stadium	4,500
Teteks	(North Macedonia) Toni Jakimovski	Tetovo	Gradski stadion Tetovo	15,000
Horizont Turnovo	(North Macedonia) Dragan Hristovski	Turnovo	Stadion Kukush	1,500
Vardar	(North Macedonia) Gjorgji Todorovski	Skopje	Philip II Arena	25,000

== League table ==
Pos	Team	Pld	W	D	L	GF	GA	GD	Pts	Qualification or relegation
1	Renova (C)	26	17	4	5	45	21	+24	55	Qualification for the Champions League second qualifying round
2	Rabotnichki	26	15	5	6	38	20	+18	50	Qualification for the Europa League first qualifying round
3	Metalurg	26	12	11	3	35	16	+19	47	Qualification for the Europa League first qualifying round
4	Pelister	26	11	6	9	28	27	+1	39	
5	Sileks	26	8	8	10	29	33	−4	32	
6	Vardar (Note: Vardar were deducted three points for not showing up for the match against Metalurg in the 18th round.)	26	9	6	11	31	28	+3	30	
7	Teteks	26	8	6	12	31	30	+1	30	Qualification for the Europa League second qualifying round (Note: Teteks qualified for the Europa League second qualifying round by winning the 2009–10 Macedonian Football Cup.)
8	Horizont Turnovo (Note: Horizont Turnovo were deducted three points for not showing up for the match against Metalurg in the 14th round.)	26	8	5	13	27	35	−8	26	
9	Makedonija G.P. (Note: Makedonija G.P. and Sloga Jugomagnat were suspended and expelled from Prva Liga for not appearing in two consecutive matches in the championship. Their matches from the 12th round onwards were expunged.) (D, R)	10	5	4	1	23	5	+18	19	Banned from playing in the league system
10	Sloga Jugomagnat (D, R)	10	3	2	5	9	14	−5	11	Banned from playing in the league system
11	Milano (R)	26	1	3	22	14	81	−67	6	Qualification for the relegation playoff
–	Pobeda (Note: Pobeda were suspended and expelled from Prva Liga. All their matches were expunged.) (D, R)	0	0	0	0	0	0	0	0	Banned from playing in the league system

Source: MacedonianFootball.com, RSSSF.org
Rules for classification: 1) Points; 2) Goal difference; 3) Goals scored; 4) Head-to-head points; 5) Head-to-head goal difference; 6) Head-to-head away goals scored (only if two teams); 7) Head-to-head goals scored; 8) Draw; 9) Play-off. (Note: Criteria 2, 3 and 8 is only used if not deciding Champion, teams for UEFA competitions or relegation).
(C) Champions; (D) Banned; (R) Relegated

== Results ==
The schedule consists of three rounds. During the first two rounds, each team plays each other once home and away for a total of 22 matches. This season, due to the suspension of two teams, each team will play a total of 20 games. The pairings of the third round will then be set according to the standings after the first two rounds, giving every team a third game against each opponent for a total of 29 games per team.

=== Matches 1–22 ===
Home \ Away	MGP	MET	MIL	PEL	POB	RAB	REN	SIL	SLO	TET	TUR	VAR	MGP	MET	MIL	PEL	POB	RAB	REN	SIL	SLO	TET	TUR	VAR
Makedonija	—	—	8–0	0–0	0–3^{2}	—	0–1^{2}	2–0	4–1	1–0^{2}	—	5–0	—	—	—	—	—	—	—	—	—	—	—	—
Metalurg	0–0	—	4–0	1–2	2–1^{2}	1–1	3–1	2–2	—	4–0	3–0^{1}	3–0^{3}	—	—	3–0	1–0	3–0^{2}	—	1–0	—	—	—	1–1	—
Milano	—	0–0	—	3–0^{1}	3–2^{2}	0–2	0–2	1–4	0–3	1–5	0–2	0–4	—	—	—	2–2	—	0–2	—	—	—	2–4	—	0–5
Pelister	—	3–0	3–1	—	1–0^{2}	1–0	1–1	1–1	0–0	3–1	1–2	1–0	—	—	—	—	1–0^{2}	1–0	—	1–0	—	0–0	—	1–0
Pobeda	0–0^{2}	0–1^{2}	4–1^{2}	0–0^{2}	—	4–2^{2}	0–4^{2}	2–2^{2}	2–0^{2}	2–0^{2}	1–0^{2}	2–1^{2}	—	—	—	—	—	—	—	—	—	2–0^{2}	0–1^{2}	—
Rabotnichki	1–1	1–1	5–1	3–0	6–2^{2}	—	2–1	1–1	—	3–1	1–0	1–0	—	1–2	—	—	—	—	—	1–2	—	2–1	—	1–1
Renova	1–0	3–1	4–0	1–0	2–1^{2}	2–0	—	3–1	3–1	1–0	3–2	3–2	—	—	1–0	3–1	2–1^{2}	0–1	—	—	—	—	2–0	—
Sileks	—	0–1	4–0	1–0	0–1^{2}	2–0	0–5	—	2–1	1–0	3–0	1–1	—	0–1	1–1	—	3–0^{2}	—	0–0	—	—	—	1–1	—
Sloga Jugomagnat	—	0–1	—	1–3^{2}	—	0–3	—	0–3^{2}	—	1–0	1–0	1–0	—	—	—	—	—	—	—	—	—	—	—	—
Teteks	2–2	0–0	6–0	1–2	3–1^{2}	0–1	0–1	1–1	3–0^{2}	—	1–0	1–0	—	0–0	—	—	—	—	0–1	2–0	—	—	—	1–1
Horizont Turnovo	0–1	1–1	3–1	4–3	3–1^{2}	0–2	2–2	2–0	2–0^{2}	0–2	—	0–1	—	—	2–1	0–1	—	0–1	—	—	—	0–1	—	—
Vardar	3–0^{2}	0–0	2–0	1–0	0–0^{2}	1–2	1–1	3–1	—	3–1	1–3	—	—	0–0	—	—	—	—	2–0	2–0	—	—	0–1	—

Source: MacedonianFootball.com
Legend: Blue = home team win; Yellow = draw; Red = away team win.
- ^{1} Matches awarded because Makedonija, Turnovo, Sloga Jugomagnat and Pelister were boycotting the championship; Turnovo and Pelister later changed their positions.
- ^{2} Matches expunged after the suspension and expulsion of Makedonija, Sloga Jugomagnat and Pobeda.
- ^{3} The match was awarded to Metalurg after Vardar boycotted the match due to FFM's involvement in cancellation of Vardar's contract with Stefan Ristovski with illegal documents.

== Relegation playoff ==
30 May 2010
16:30 CEST

Milano	1–2 (a.e.t.)	Bregalnica Shtip
Stojanovski 78'	Report	Dimovski 72'; Novakov 110' (pen.)

Stadion Gjorche Petrov, Skopje
Attendance: 1,000
Referee: Dimitar Mechkarovski (Skopje)

== Top goalscorers ==
Rank	Player	Club	Goals
1	(North Macedonia) Bobi Bozhinovski	Rabotnichki	15
2	(North Macedonia) Besart Ibraimi	Renova	12
2	(North Macedonia) Dushan Savikj	Rabotnichki	12
4	(North Macedonia) Dragan Dimitrovski	Pelister & Pobeda	11
4	(North Macedonia) Boban Janchevski	Renova	11
6	(North Macedonia) Ilija Nestorovski	Pobeda	10
7	(North Macedonia) Blazhe Ilijoski	Metalurg	9
8	(North Macedonia) Ilber Ali	Renova	7
8	(North Macedonia) Marjan Altiparmakovski	Pelister	7
8	(North Macedonia) Dragan Georgiev	Turnovo	7
8	(North Macedonia) Ivica Gligorovski	Makedonija & Teteks	7
8	(North Macedonia) Mile Krstev	Metalurg	7
8	(North Macedonia) Aleksandar Stojanovski	Teteks & Milano	7
8	(Bosnia and Herzegovina) Boško Stupić	Vardar	7
8	(Brazil) (North Macedonia) Wandeir	Rabotnichki	7

Source: Soccerway

== See also ==
- 2009–10 Macedonian Football Cup
- 2009–10 Macedonian Second Football League
