= Angelko Panov =

Macedonian footballer

Personal information
- Full name: Angelko Panov; Ангелко Панов
- Date of birth: 21 January 1979 (age 47)
- Place of birth: Skopje, SFR Yugoslavia
- Height: 1.87 m (6 ft 2 in)
- Position: Midfielder

Senior career*
Years	Team	Apps	(Gls)
1998–1999	Rabotnički		
1999–2000	Pobeda	9	(2)
1999–2000	Hajduk Split	2	(0)
2000–2001	Rabotnički	17	(4)
2001	Vardar	12	(2)
2002	Makedonija	15	(2)
2002–2003	OFK Beograd	14	(3)

International career
2001	Macedonia U21		
2001–2002	Macedonia	2	(0)
- * Club domestic league appearances and goals

Angelko Panov (Macedonian: Ангелко Панов; born 21 January 1979) is a Macedonian retired footballer.

== Club career ==
After having played in several best teams in his country, and also HNK Hajduk Split in the Croatian First Leaguye, in 2002, he moved to Serbia to play in the capital's club OFK Belgrade.

== International career ==
Panov made his senior debut for Macedonia in a November 2001 friendly match against Hungary and has earned a total of 2 caps, scoring no goals. His second and final international was an August 2008 friendly against Malta.

== Honours ==
Vardar

- Macedonian First Football League: 2001–02
