= Vlatko Novakov =

Macedonian footballer

Personal information
- Date of birth: 28 September 1978 (age 48)
- Height: 1.79 m (5 ft 10 in)
- Position: Defender

Senior career*
Years	Team	Apps	(Gls)
1997–2001	FK Sileks		
2001–2002	FK Vardar		
2002–2003?	FK Napredok Kičevo		
2004?–2005	FK Bregalnica Štip		
2005–2007	FK Vlazrimi		

International career
1998	Macedonia	1	(0)
- * Club domestic league appearances and goals

Vlatko Novakov (born 28 September 1978) is a retired Macedonian football defender.
