= Toni Jakimovski =

Macedonian footballer (born 1966)

Personal information
- Date of birth: 19 April 1966 (age 60)
- Place of birth: Tetovo, SFR Yugoslavia
- Height: 1.80 m (5 ft 11 in)
- Position: Defender

Senior career*
Years	Team	Apps	(Gls)
1982–1986	Teteks	42	(4)
1988–1989	Radnički Kragujevac	30	(3)
- Ljuboten
1995–1997	Vardar		
1999–2003	Cementarnica 55		

International career
1995	Macedonia	1	(0)

Managerial career
- 2003-2004: Vardar (assistant)
- 2004: Vardar
- 2005–2006: Renova
- 2008–2011: Teteks
- 2012–2013: Gostivar
- 2014–2015: Gorno Lisiče
- 2015–2016: Bregalnica Štip
- 2017: Utenis Utena (assistant)
- * Club domestic league appearances and goals

Toni Jakimovski (Macedonian: Тони Јакимовски, born 19 April 1966) is a Macedonian football manager and former player.

== Playing career ==
=== Club ===
Born in Tetovo, SR Macedonia, back then within Yugoslavia he played with FK Vardar in the Macedonian First Football League. He played with Vardar in the 1996–97 UEFA Cup. Earlier he had played in the Yugoslav Second League with FK Teteks between 1982 and 1986 and with FK Radnički Kragujevac in 1988–89.

=== International ===
He made one appearance for the Macedonian national team in 1995 in a friendly match against Turkey in Istanbul.

== Managerial career ==
Toni Jakimovski was FK Vardar coach for a short period during the 2003–04 season. He also managed FK Teteks in the 2009–10 and 2010–11 seasons, FK Gostivar in 2013–14 and FK Gorno Lisiče during the 2014–15 season. In September 2015, Jakimovski became a coach of FK Bregalnica Štip.

On 23 March 2017 he joined Lithuanian A Lyga club Utenis Utena as an assistant manager to Zvezdan Milošević, but left the club in May, month after the Swede was sacked.

== Managerial statistics ==
As of 4 October 2020

Managerial record by team and tenure
Team	From	To	Record				
Team	From	To	G	W	D	L	Win %
Vardar	2004	2004	2	2	0	0	100.00
Renova	December 2005	June 2006					
Teteks	2008	July 2011	112	49	27	36	43.75
Gostivar	July 2012	2013					
Gorno Lisiče	July 2014	Juni 2015	27	10	5	12	37.04
Bregalnica Štip	Sep 2015	Mar 2016					
Total			141	61	32	48	43.26

== Honours ==
=== Club ===
Cementarnica 55

  - Macedonian Cup:
    - Winners (1): 2002–03
    - Runners-up (1): 2001–02

=== Manager ===
Teteks

  - Macedonian Second League:
    - Winners (1): 2008-09
  - Macedonian Cup:
    - Winners (1): 2009–10
    - Runners-up (1): 2010–11
