= Agron Memedi =

North Macedonian footballer (1980–2026)

Personal information
- Date of birth: 5 November 1980
- Place of birth: Tetovo, SR Macedonia, SFR Yugoslavia
- Date of death: 14 November 2026 (aged 46)
- Place of death: Tetovo, North Macedonia
- Height: 1.73 m (5 ft 8 in)
- Position: Left-back

Youth career
- –2004: Shkëndija

Senior career*
Years	Team	Apps	(Gls)
2004–2007	Shkëndija	71	(4)
2007–2011	Renova	123	(8)
2011–2012	Metalurg Skopje	43	(0)
2012–2016	Renova	108	(11)
2017	Renova	1	(0)
Total		345	(23)

International career
2010	Macedonia	1	(0)

Managerial career
- 2018: Renova
- * Club domestic league appearances and goals

Agron Memedi (Macedonian: Агрон Мемеди; 5 November 1980 – 14 November 2026) was a Macedonian footballer who played as a left-back.

== Playing career ==
Memedi started his career in the youth teams of Shkëndija, before being promoted to the first team in 2004. He spent his whole career in North Macedonia, playing for Shkëndija, Renova, and Metalurg Skopje, initially announcing his retirement in January 2017, but briefly returned for a league match against Brera Strumica in September 2017.

He made one appearance for the Macedonia national team, in a 0–0 draw against Albania on 17 November 2010. He had previously been an unused substitute for Macedonia in a 0–0 draw against Norway during 2010 FIFA World Cup qualification.

== Post-playing career ==
Following his retirement, he briefly served as the manager of Renova in 2018. Afterwards, he worked with Shkëndija's youth teams, before being promoted to one of the club's first-team coaches on 10 August 2026.

== Death ==
On 14 November 2026, Memedi collapsed during a training session in Tetovo. He was taken to hospital, but died later that day, at the age of 46.

== Honours ==
Renova

- Macedonian First Football League: 2009–10

Metalurg Skopje

- Macedonian Football Cup: 2010–11
