= Vlado Trifunov =

Macedonian footballer

Personal information
- Date of birth: 18 April 1970 (age 56)
- Position: Midfielder

Senior career*
Years	Team	Apps	(Gls)
1994–1999	FK Makedonija Gjorče Petrov		

International career
1995	Macedonia	1	(0)
- * Club domestic league appearances and goals

Vlado Trifunov (born 18 April 1970) is a retired Macedonian football midfielder.
