= Metodija Stepanovski =

Macedonian footballer

Personal information
- Date of birth: 26 May 1983 (age 43)
- Place of birth: Bitola, SFR Yugoslavia
- Height: 1.86 m (6 ft 1 in)
- Position: Defender

Senior career*
Years	Team	Apps	(Gls)
2001-2003	FK Pelister	12	(0)
2003-2004	FK Napredok	21	(1)
2004-2005	Ionikos	2	(0)
2005-2007	FK Rabotnički	20	(5)
2007-2009	FK Pelister	35	(1)
2009-2013	FK Renova	100	(5)
2013-2016	FK Pelister	49	(1)
2013-2014	→ FK Napredok (loan)	12	(0)
2017	FK Novaci	10	(1)

International career
	Macedonia U-21	6	(1)
2010	Macedonia	1	(0)
- * Club domestic league appearances and goals

Metodija Stepanovski (Macedonian: Методија Степановски; born 26 May 1983 in Bitola) is a retired Macedonian football defender.
