= Nedžat Šabani =

Association football player

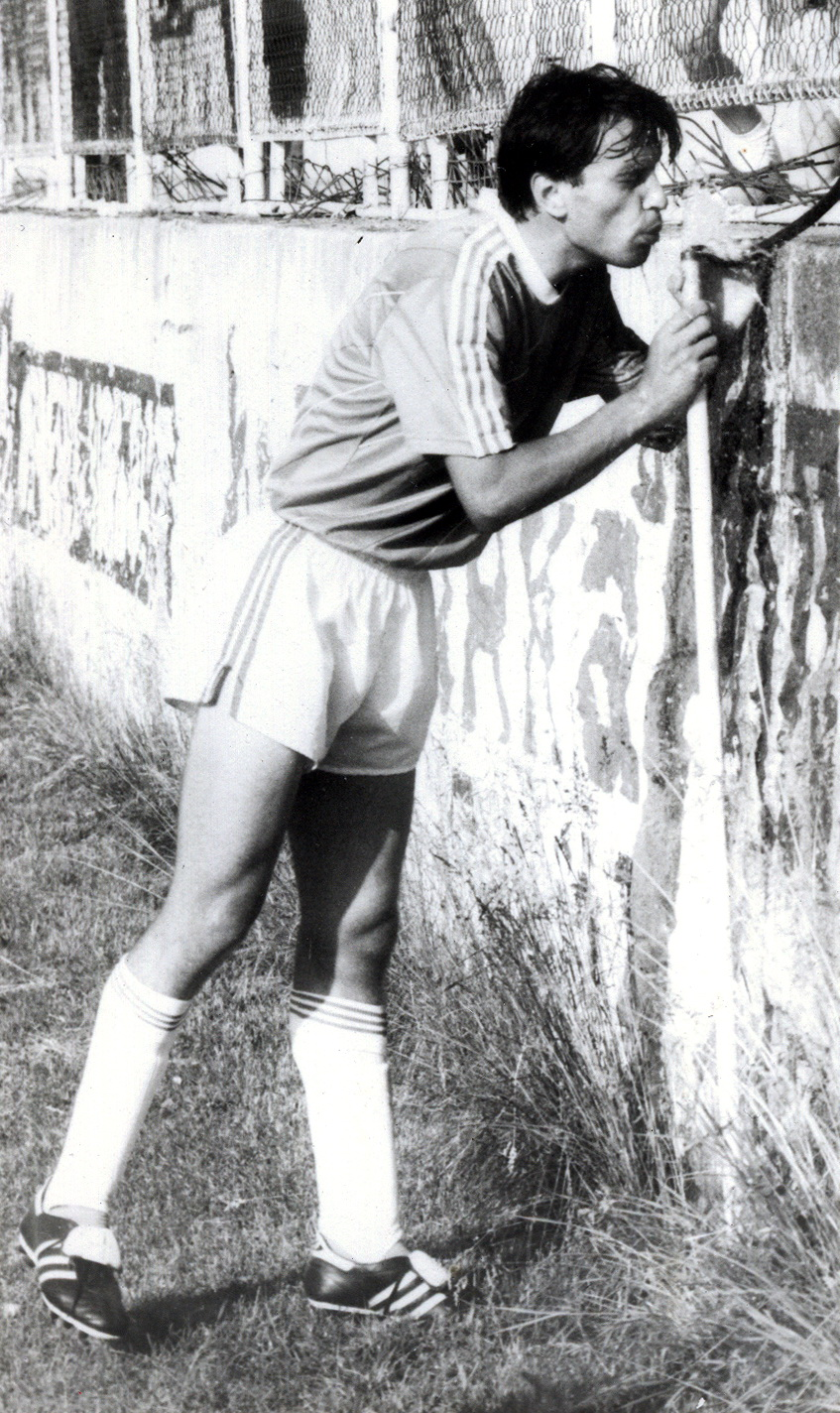
- Nedžat Šabani in 1980's

Personal information
- Full name: Nexhat Shabani; Неџат Шабани
- Date of birth: 11 November 1963 (age 63)
- Place of birth: Gjilan, SFR Yugoslavia
- Position: Forward

Senior career*
Years	Team	Apps	(Gls)
1983–1984	Vardar	1	(0)
1984–1985	Liria Prizren	18	(4)
1985–1987	Belasica	48	(19)
1987–1989	Proleter Zrenjanin	15	(0)
1989–1991	Metalurg Skopje		
1992–1993	Sarıyer	9	(4)
1993–1994	Kayserispor	13	(3)

Managerial career
- 2002: Sloga Jugomagnat
- 2003–2006: Sloga Jugomagnat (assistant)
- 2006: Vëllazërimi
- 2007: Sloga Jugomagnat
- 2007-2008: Bashkimi
- 2009: Sloga Jugomagnat
- 2010: Renova
- 2011–2012: Shkëndija
- * Club domestic league appearances and goals

Nedžat Šabani (Macedonian: Неџат Шабани; Albanian: Nexhat Shabani; born 11 November 1963) is a Macedonian football manager and former striker of Albanian descent.

== Club career ==
After playing initially with Vardar in the Yugoslav First League, he went on during the mid-1980s to several Yugoslav Second League clubs in order to gain more experience, such were Liria Prizren, Belasica and Proleter Zrenjanin. He then also played with third-level side Metalurg Skopje which was at time rising to become in the flowing decade a regular participant in the Macedonian top-league.

He then moved to Turkey and played in the Süper Lig one season with Sarıyer (1992/93), and another with Kayserispor (1993/94).

== Managerial career ==
He started coaching Sloga Jugomagnat in March 2002 after the departure of the main coach Gjore Jovanovski whose Šabani was working with as assistant manager. Once Jovanovski left to Turkey to coach Sansunspor, the Renova direction board decided to give a chance to Šabani to demonstrate his skills as main coach. He would resign in late October that year.

Šabani later coached Renova from July 2008 till November 2010. What he became best known was by taking the relatively unknown village club to win the 2009–10 Macedonian First Football League.

In October 2011 Šabani was appointed as the main coach of KF Shkëndija.

== Honours ==
As coach:

Renova

- Macedonian First League: 2009–10
