= Panče Ristevski =

Macedonian footballer

Personal information
- Date of birth: 30 September 1974 (age 52)
- Height: 1.79 m (5 ft 10 in)
- Position: Midfielder

Senior career*
Years	Team	Apps	(Gls)
1999–2002	FK Pobeda		
2002–2003	FK Rabotnički		
2003–2004	FK Belasica		
2004–2006	FK Pobeda		
2006	KF Apolonia Fier		
2007	FK Pobeda		

International career
2000	North Macedonia	1	(0)
- * Club domestic league appearances and goals

Panče Ristevski (born 30 September 1974) is a retired Macedonian football midfielder.
