= Eftim Aksentiev =

Macedonian footballer

Personal information
- Full name: Eftim Aksentiev
- Date of birth: 17 August 1985 (age 41)
- Place of birth: Kočani, SR Macedonia, SFR Yugoslavia
- Height: 1.71 m (5 ft 7 1/2 in)
- Positions: Midfielder; striker

Team information
- Current team: FK Osogovo

Senior career*
Years	Team	Apps	(Gls)
2004–2007	Sileks	65	(12)
2008–2010	Rabotnički	18	(1)
2010–2011	Skënderbeu Korçë	4	(1)
2011	→ FC CSKA Moscow (loan)		
2011	Bregalnica	11	(0)
2012–2013	Gostivar		
2013–2014	Bregalnica	34	(3)
2015–2015	Euromilk GL		
2016–2017	Osogovo	46	(18)
2017–2018	Sasa	14	(2)
2018–	Osogovo	0	(0)
- * Club domestic league appearances and goals

Eftim Aksentiev (Macedonian: Ефтим Аксентиев; born 17 August 1985) is a footballer from the Republic of Macedonia that plays as a midfielder / striker for FK Osogovo
