= Muharem Bajrami =

Macedonian footballer (born 1985)

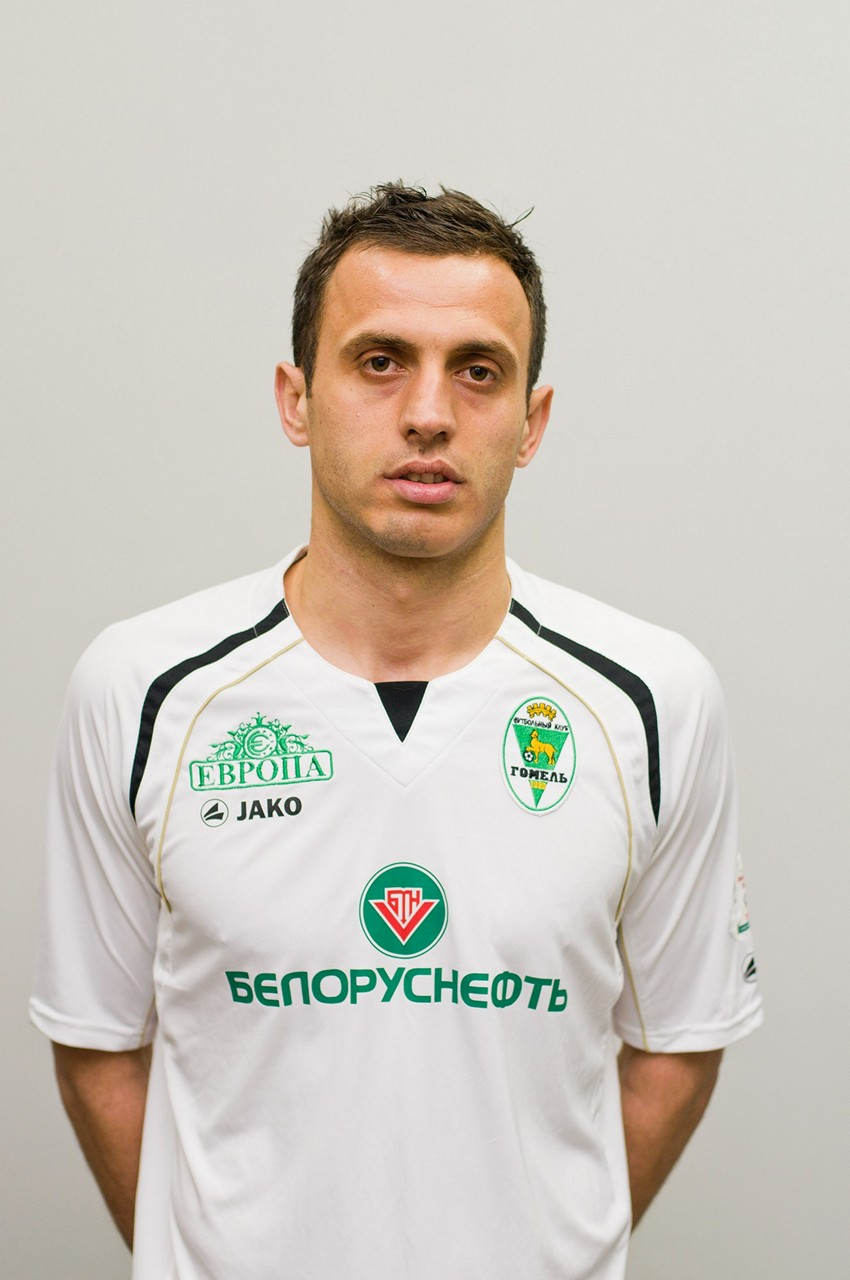

Personal information
- Date of birth: 29 November 1985 (age 40)
- Place of birth: Skopje, SFR Yugoslavia
- Height: 1.85 m (6 ft 1 in)
- Position: Midfielder

Senior career*
| Years | Team | Apps | (Gls) |
| 2004–2005 | Sloga Jugomagnat | | |
| 2005–2006 | Vëllazërimi | 25 | (15) |
| 2006–2007 | FBK Kaunas | 5 | (0) |
| 2008 | Šilutė | 17 | (4) |
| 2009–2012 | Renova | 95 | (22) |
| 2013 | Gomel | 1 | (0) |
| 2013 | Shkëndija | 10 | (1) |
| 2014–2020 | Shkupi | 145 | (16) |

International career
| 2002 | Macedonia U21 | 7 | (1) |
| 2005 | Macedonia B | 1 | (0) |

Managerial career
- 2020: Shkupi
- 2021–2023: Makedonija Gjorče Petrov
- 2023: Shkëndija (assistant)
- 2024–2025: Gjilani (assistant)
- * Club domestic league appearances and goals

Muharem Bajrami (Macedonian: Мухарем Бајрами; born 29 November 1985) is a Macedonian retired professional footballer who played as a midfielder.

== Club career ==
Bajrami started his playing career in FK Sloga Jugomagnat, but after the relegation of Sloga Jugomagnat, He joined the new team in the first Macedonian league Vëllazërimi along with his teammate Minas Osmani who was in Vëllazërimi on loan from FK Vardar. Bajrami had an excellent half-season in Vëllazërimi, in which he scored 15 goals and was named man of the match 11 times. He was a leader in both the top scorers table and in the MVP table. These statistics led to Bajrami being watched by several teams, before FBK Kaunas eventually signed him on a five-year contract.

== International career ==
Bajrami was also a member of the Macedonia U21 national team. He has a younger brother, Idai Bajrami, who played for FK Sloga Jugomagnat and was capped in the Republic of Macedonian U-17 squad.
