= Igor Stojanov =

Macedonian footballer and coach

Personal information
- Full name: Igor Stojanov; Игор Стојанов
- Date of birth: 12 February 1976 (age 50)
- Place of birth: Štip, SFR Yugoslavia
- Height: 1.81 m (5 ft 11 1/2 in)
- Position: Defender

Senior career*
Years	Team	Apps	(Gls)
1998–2002	Vardar	99	(0)
2004–2006	Rabotnički	39	(0)
2006	Elbasani		
2007–2010	Renova	94	(2)
2011	Rabotnički	18	(0)
2012–2014	Bregalnica Štip	54	(1)

International career
2000–2001	Macedonia	5	(0)

Managerial career
- 2015: Bregalnica Štip
- 2016: Bregalnica Štip
- * Club domestic league appearances and goals

Igor Stojanov (Macedonian: Игор Стојанов) (born 12 February 1976) is a Macedonian retired football player and coach, who was coach at FK Bregalnica Štip in the Macedonian First League.

== Playing career ==
=== Club ===
Born in Štip, SR Macedonia, SFR Yugoslavia, he played with several clubs in the Macedonian First League, namely, FK Vardar, FK Rabotnički, FK Renova and FK Bregalnica Štip. He had a spell in Albania in 2006 with Elbasani (2006)

=== International ===
He made his senior debut for Macedonia in a July 2000 friendly match against Azerbaijan and has earned a total of 5 caps, scoring no goals. His final international was an October 2001 FIFA World Cup qualification match against Slovakia.

== Managerial career ==
After the retirement in 2014, two years later, he became a coach of Bregalnica Štip.
