= Vasko Božinovski =

Macedonian footballer

Personal information
- Full name: Vasko Božinovski
- Date of birth: 11 March 1975 (age 51)
- Place of birth: Skopje, SFR Yugoslavia
- Height: 1.83 m (6 ft 0 in)
- Position: Defender

Youth career
- Makedonija Gjorče Petrov

Senior career*
Years	Team	Apps	(Gls)
1999–2001	Makedonija	31	(1)
2002–2004	Osijek	63	(3)
2004–2005	Kamen Ingrad	41	(0)
2006–2007	Makedonija	29	(1)
2007–2008	Rabotnički	22	(0)
2008–2009	Vardar	23	(0)
2009–2010	Rabotnički	15	(0)
2010–2016	Makedonija	29	(1)

International career^{‡}
2004–2006	Macedonia	16	(0)
- * Club domestic league appearances and goals as of 17 July 2009 ‡ National team caps and goals as of 17 July 2009

Vasko Božinovski (Macedonian: Васко Божиновски; born 11 March 1975) is a retired footballer from the Republic of Macedonia who played most of his career as a central defender for Makedonija Gjorče Petrov.

== International career ==
He made his senior debut for Macedonia in a January 2004 friendly match away against China and has earned a total of 16 caps, scoring no goals. His final international was a March 2006 friendly match against Bulgaria in Skopje.
