= 2009–10 Macedonian Second Football League =

Macedonian Second League
- Season: 2009–10
- Champions: Shkëndija
- Promoted: Shkëndija; Skopje; Napredok; Bregalnica Shtip
- Relegated: None

The 2009–10 Macedonian Second Football League was the eighteenth season since its establishment. It began on 15 August 2009 and ended on 19 May 2010. Due to the expansion of the league, no teams were relegated that season.

== Participating teams ==
Location of teams in 2009–10 Macedonian Second League

| Club | City | Stadium | Capacity |
|---|---|---|---|
| 11 Oktomvri | Prilep | Stadion Goce Delchev | 15,000 |
| Belasica | Strumica | Stadion Mladost | 6,370 |
| Bregalnica 2008 | Shtip | Gradski stadion Shtip | 4,000 |
| Cementarnica 55 | Skopje | Stadion Cementarnica | 2,000 |
| Drita | Bogovinje | Stadion Bogovinje | 500 |
| Lokomotiva | Skopje | Stadion Komunalec | 1,000 |
| Miravci | Miravci | Stadion Miravci | 1,000 |
| Napredok | Kichevo | Gradski stadion Kichevo | 5,000 |
| Novaci 2005 | Novaci | Stadion Novaci | 500 |
| Ohrid 2004 | Ohrid | SRC Biljanini Izvori | 3,000 |
| Skopje | Skopje | Stadion Avtokomanda | 4,000 |
| Shkëndija 79 | Tetovo | Gradski stadion Tetovo | 15,000 |
| Vlaznimi | Struga | Stadion Gradska Plazha | 500 |
| Vëllazërimi | Kichevo | Gradski stadion Kichevo | 5,000 |

== League table ==
| Pos | Team | Pld | W | D | L | GF | GA | GD | Pts | Promotion |
|---|---|---|---|---|---|---|---|---|---|---|
| 1 | Shkëndija (Note: Shkëndija were deducted 6 points for unpaid obligations to three Senegalese players.) (C, P) | 26 | 20 | 3 | 3 | 57 | 15 | +42 | 57 | Promotion to Macedonian First League |
| 2 | Skopje (P) | 26 | 17 | 6 | 3 | 49 | 22 | +27 | 57 | Promotion to Macedonian First League |
| 3 | Napredok (P) | 26 | 17 | 3 | 6 | 55 | 32 | +23 | 54 | Promotion to Macedonian First League |
| 4 | Bregalnica Shtip (P) | 26 | 15 | 7 | 4 | 49 | 20 | +29 | 52 | Qualification to Promotion play-off |
| 5 | Drita | 26 | 12 | 5 | 9 | 36 | 34 | +2 | 41 | |
| 6 | Miravci | 26 | 11 | 3 | 12 | 31 | 31 | 0 | 36 | |
| 7 | 11 Oktomvri | 26 | 10 | 4 | 12 | 30 | 34 | −4 | 34 | |
| 8 | Belasica | 26 | 10 | 3 | 13 | 27 | 40 | −13 | 33 | |
| 9 | Novaci | 26 | 8 | 7 | 11 | 26 | 37 | −11 | 31 | |
| 10 | Lokomotiva | 26 | 8 | 5 | 13 | 29 | 30 | −1 | 29 | |
| 11 | Vlaznimi | 26 | 7 | 7 | 12 | 26 | 42 | −16 | 28 | |
| 12 | Cementarnica 55 | 26 | 7 | 5 | 14 | 21 | 40 | −19 | 26 | |
| 13 | Vëllazërimi | 26 | 3 | 5 | 18 | 16 | 49 | −33 | 14 | |
| 14 | Ohrid (Note: Ohrid were deducted 3 points.) | 26 | 5 | 1 | 20 | 26 | 52 | −26 | 13 | |

Source: MacedonianFootball.com, Soccerway
Rules for classification: 1) Points; 2) Head-to-head points; 3) Head-to-head goal difference; 4) Head-to-head away goals scored
(C) Champions; (P) Promoted

== Results ==
| Home \ Away | OKT | BEL | BRE | CEM | DRI | LOK | MIR | NAP | NOV | OHR | SKO | SKE | VLN | VLZ |
|---|---|---|---|---|---|---|---|---|---|---|---|---|---|---|
| 11 Oktomvri | — | 1–0 | 0–0 | 2–2 | 2–1 | 2–0 | 0–1 | 0–1 | 0–1 | 2–0 | 0–1 | 1–0 | 2–0 | 1–0 |
| Belasica | 2–4 | — | 0–3 | 1–2 | 3–1 | 2–1 | 0–0 | 0–3 | 2–1 | 2–1 | 1–1 | 0–2 | 3–0 | 0–0 |
| Bregalnica Shtip | 4–1 | 1–0 | — | 5–0 | 2–1 | 1–0 | 3–1 | 2–3 | 1–1 | 1–0 | 2–3 | 0–1 | 5–1 | 5–0 |
| Cementarnica 55 | 2–1 | 4–1 | 1–2 | — | 0–2 | 0–0 | 2–0 | 1–2 | 0–1 | 0–3 | 0–2 | 0–1 | 1–0 | 1–0 |
| Drita | 1–1 | 3–0 | 1–1 | 1–0 | — | 3–1 | 1–0 | 2–1 | 1–1 | 1–0 | 2–3 | 0–0 | 2–0 | 1–0 |
| Lokomotiva | 3–0 | 0–1 | 0–1 | 2–0 | 2–0 | — | 0–1 | 0–1 | 3–0 | 2–0 | 1–2 | 1–2 | 0–0 | 2–0 |
| Miravci | 1–0 | 3–1 | 0–2 | 2–1 | 1–3 | 5–1 | — | 3–1 | 3–1 | 0–0 | 1–1 | 0–4 | 1–0 | 3–0 |
| Napredok | 1–1 | 1–2 | 0–0 | 5–0 | 4–0 | 2–3 | 2–1 | — | 3–1 | 2–1 | 3–2 | 2–2 | 5–1 | 1–0 |
| Novaci | 1–2 | 0–1 | 1–1 | 0–0 | 0–1 | 0–0 | 1–0 | 0–2 | — | 3–0 | 2–4 | 2–0 | 2–1 | 2–1 |
| Ohrid | 2–3 | 0–2 | 0–3 | 3–0 | 3–2 | 0–3 | 3–2 | 1–2 | 2–3 | — | 0–1 | 1–3 | 0–2 | 4–1 |
| Skopje | 2–0 | 3–0 | 0–0 | 0–0 | 1–3 | 2–0 | 2–0 | 2–1 | 2–0 | 5–0 | — | 1–1 | 2–0 | 4–0 |
| Shkëndija | 3–1 | 2–0 | 3–0 | 2–1 | 5–1 | 1–0 | 1–0 | 4–1 | 5–0 | 4–1 | 4–0 | — | 3–0 | 2–0 |
| Vlaznimi | 2–1 | 2–1 | 1–1 | 1–1 | 1–1 | 2–2 | 1–0 | 2–3 | 2–2 | 1–0 | 0–2 | 2–1 | — | 1–0 |
| Vëllazërimi | 3–2 | 0–2 | 0–3 | 1–2 | 2–1 | 2–2 | 0–1 | 1–3 | 0–0 | 2–1 | 1–1 | 0–1 | 2–2 | — |

Source: MacedonianFootball.com, Soccerway
Legend: Blue = home team win; Yellow = draw; Red = away team win.

== Promotion playoff ==
30 May 2010
16:30 CEST

| Milano | 1–2 (a.e.t.) | Bregalnica Shtip |
|---|---|---|
| Stojanovski 78' | Report | Dimovski 72'; Novakov 110' (pen.) |

Stadion Gjorche Petrov, Skopje
Attendance: 1,000
Referee: Dimitar Mechkarovski (Skopje)

== See also ==
- 2009–10 Macedonian Football Cup
- 2009–10 Macedonian First Football League
