= Vulnet Emini =

Macedonian footballer (born 1978)

Vullnet Emini
Personal information
- Date of birth: 10 September 1978 (age 48)
- Place of birth: Tetovo, SFR Yugoslavia
- Height: 1.80 m (5 ft 11 in)
- Position: Midfielder

Senior career*
Years	Team	Apps	(Gls)
2001–2003	VfR Aalen	5	(0)
2002–2007	Shkëndija	70	(19)
2007–2012	Renova	152	(27)
2013	FC Gossau		

International career
2005–2006	Macedonia B	3	(0)
2006	Macedonia	1	(0)
- * Club domestic league appearances and goals

Vullnet Emini (Macedonian: Вулнет Емини; born 10 September 1978) is a Macedonian former professional footballer who played as a midfielder. He twice represented the Macedonia national team.

Emini made his senior debut for Macedonia in a November 2005 friendly match against Paraguay and has earned a total of three caps. His final international was a June 2006 friendly against Turkey.

== External sources ==
- Vulnet Emini at National-Football-Teams.com
- Vulnet Emini at WorldFootball.net
- Profile at MacedonianFootball
