= Davor Taleski =

Macedonian professional footballer (born 1995)

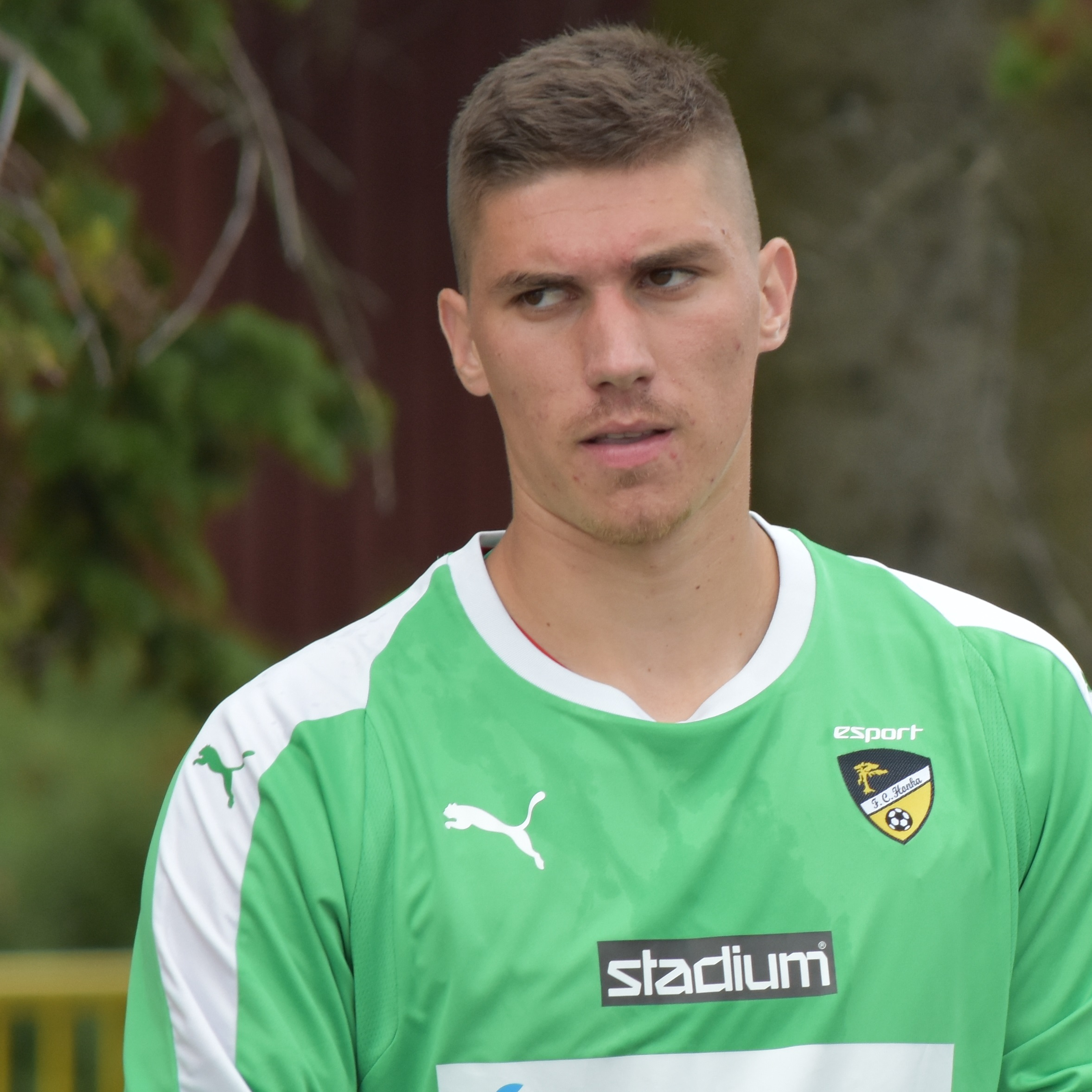

Personal information
- Full name: Davor Taleski; Давор Талески
- Date of birth: 19 May 1995 (age 31)
- Place of birth: Prilep, Republic of Macedonia
- Height: 1.93 m (6 ft 4 in)
- Position: Goalkeeper

Team information
- Current team: Vardar
- Number: 95

Youth career
- –2012: 11 Oktomvri

Senior career*
Years	Team	Apps	(Gls)
2012–2013	11 Oktomvri	1	(0)
2013–2016	Metalurg	32	(0)
2016–2018	Pobeda	49	(0)
2018–2019	Honka	23	(0)
2019	AE Larisa	0	(0)
2019–2020	Bregalnica		
2020–2021	Pelister	29	(0)
2021–2022	Struga	30	(0)
2022–2025	Shkëndija	46	(0)
2025–	Vardar	43	(0)

International career^{‡}
2012	Macedonia U18	1	(0)
2008–2013	Macedonia U19	2	(0)
2014	Macedonia U20	3	(0)
2015	Macedonia U21	0	(0)
2026–	North Macedonia	1	(0)
- * Club domestic league appearances and goals as of 23 May 2026 ‡ National team caps and goals as of 16:43, 2 June 2026 (UTC)

Davor Taleski (Давор Талески; born 19 May 1995) is a Macedonian professional footballer who plays as a goalkeeper for Vardar and the North Macedonia national team.

== International career ==
Taleski was called up to the North Macedonia national team for a set of friendlies in June 2026.
