= Ivica Gligorovski =

Macedonian footballer

Personal information
- Full name: Ivica Gligorovski; Ивица Глигоровски
- Date of birth: 15 April 1981 (age 45)
- Place of birth: SFR Yugoslavia
- Height: 1.81 m (5 ft 11 in)
- Positions: Winger; striker

Senior career*
Years	Team	Apps	(Gls)
1999–2000	Borec	24	(4)
2000–2004	Sileks	103	(49)
2004–2005	Ethnikos	14	(2)
2005–2007	Vardar	29	(1)
2007–2009	Milano Kumanovo	52	(30)
2009–2010	Makedonija	12	(5)
2010–2011	Teteks	38	(5)
2012	Bregalnica Štip	2	(0)

International career
2003–2004	Macedonia	3	(0)

Managerial career
- 2012–2013: Rudar Probistip
- 2013–2014: Akademija Gligorovski
- 2014–: Sileks Youth
- * Club domestic league appearances and goals as of 17 July 2009

Ivica Gligorovski (Macedonian: Ивица Глигоровски; born 15 April 1981) is a Macedonian football player who currently is coaching in his own youth academy.

Gligorovski has twice been the top scorer of the First Macedonian Football League, scoring 15 goals during the 2007–08 and 14 goals during the 2008–09 season, with FK Milano Kumanovo.

== International career ==
Gligorovski has made 3 appearances for the Macedonia national football team, making his debut as a second-half substitute in a friendly against Croatia on 9 February 2003. His final international was a January 2004 friendly match against China.
