= KF Renova =

Macedonian association football club

- Full name: Klubi Futbollit Renova Xhepçisht
- Nickname: Гипсари (Plaster Makers)
- Founded: 2003; 23 years ago
- Ground: Renova Stadium
- Chairman: Qenan Idrizi
- Manager: None
- 2025–26: Third League (West), 9th (withdraw)
Home colours	Away colours

KF Renova (Macedonian: ФК Ренова) is a football club based in the village of Džepčište, Tetovo Municipality, North Macedonia. They recently competed in the Macedonian Third League (West Division).

== History ==
FK Renova was founded in 2003 but was derived from the football school established in 2000. As a result of successful work in 2003, the people from Džepčište began to invest in this school of football. Since then, the football school was named Renova, after the Džepčište based manufacturing company, which invested the most to the club. Renova then merged with the Tetovo club FK Shkumbini and was initiated into the Macedonian Third League.

In the club's first season, they came first in the league. To achieve promotion into the second league, Renova had to beat Vardar from Negotino. Renova won the game via penalty shootout. In the 2004–2005 season, Renova achieved second position, allowing the club to move up to the Macedonian First League.

In the 2009-10 season, Renova won the Macedonian First League title, being the youngest Macedonian football club to do so. Two years later they won their first Macedonian Cup title by defeating Rabotnički 3–1 in the final.

In July 2022, Renova withdrew from the First Macedonian Football League due to financial reasons. From the 2022–23 season, they restarted from the Macedonian Regional Football Leagues. But achieved promotion to the Macedonian Third Football League in the 2023-24 season where they competed until the 2025-26 season, withdrawing again at the end of the season back to the regional league.

== Honours ==
- (North Macedonia) Macedonian First League
  - Winners (1): 2009–10
- (North Macedonia) Macedonian Second League
  - Runners-up (1): 2004–05
- (North Macedonia) Macedonian Third League
  - Winners (1): 2003–04
- (North Macedonia) Macedonian Football Cup
  - Winners (1): 2012

== Recent seasons ==
Season	League									Cup	European competitions	
Season	Division	P	W	D	L	F	A	Pts	Pos	Cup	European competitions	
2003–04	3. MFL North	?	?	?	?	?	?	?	1st ↑			
2004–05	2. MFL	33	22	5	6	63	27	71	2nd ↑	PR		
2005–06	1. MFL	33	13	5	15	45	49	44	7th	R2		
2006–07	1. MFL	33	17	8	8	53	31	59	5th	QF		
2007–08	1. MFL	33	13	8	12	34	34	41	5th	QF		
2008–09	1. MFL	30	14	12	4	41	26	54	3rd	QF	Intertoto Cup	R2
2009–10	1. MFL	26	17	4	5	45	21	55	1st	QF	Europa League	QR1
2010–11	1. MFL	33	17	9	7	54	31	60	3rd	R2	Champions League	QR2
2011–12	1. MFL	33	13	13	7	56	38	52	4th	W	Europa League	QR1
2012–13	1. MFL	33	12	7	14	35	46	43	8th	QF	Europa League	QR2
2013–14	1. MFL	33	10	14	9	42	46	44	8th	R2		
2014–15	1. MFL	32	13	9	10	41	39	48	4th	SF		
2015–16	1. MFL	33	13	8	12	49	42	47	7th	R2	Europa League	QR1
2016–17	1. MFL	36	13	13	10	42	37	52	5th	R2		
2017–18	1. MFL	36	10	11	15	36	53	41	7th	SF		
2018–19	1. MFL	36	12	11	13	53	49	47	6th	R1		
2019–20^{1}	1. MFL	23	9	4	10	25	33	31	4th	N/A		
2020–21	1. MFL	33	8	12	13	36	46	36	4th	QF	Europa League	QR2
2021–22	1. MFL	33	12	12	9	42	29	48	5th	R2		
2022–23	1. MFL	The club have withdrawn from the league							↓	N/A		
2023–24	OFS Tetovo	24	15	2	7	72	43	47	4th ↑			
2024–25	3. MFL West	24	9	2	13	61	67	29	9th			
2025–26	3. MFL West	20	6	2	12	42	61	20	9th ↓			

^{1}The 2019–20 season was abandoned due to the COVID-19 pandemic in North Macedonia.

== Renova in Europe ==
- Q = qualifier
- R1 = first round / R2 = second round

Season	Competition	Round		Club	Score
2008	UEFA Intertoto Cup	R1	(Croatia)	HNK Rijeka	0–0, 2–0
2008	UEFA Intertoto Cup	R2	(Israel)	Bnei Sakhnin	1–2, 0–1
2009–10	UEFA Europa League	Q1	(Belarus)	FC Dinamo Minsk	1–2, 1–1
2010–11	UEFA Champions League	Q2	(Cyprus)	AC Omonia	0–3, 0–2
2011–12	UEFA Europa League	Q1	(Northern Ireland)	Glentoran FC	2–1, 1–2 (p)
2012–13	UEFA Europa League	Q1	(San Marino)	AC Libertas	4–0, 4–0
2012–13	UEFA Europa League	Q2	(Belarus)	FC Gomel	0–2, 1–0
2015–16	UEFA Europa League	Q1	(Moldova)	Dacia Chisinau	0–1, 1–4
2020–21	UEFA Europa League	Q1	(Armenia)	Alashkert	1–0
2020–21	UEFA Europa League	Q2	(Croatia)	Hajduk Split	0−1

== Notable players ==
Had international caps for their respective countries. Players whose name is listed in bold represented their countries while playing for KF Renova.

- (Cameroon) Patrick Mevoungou
- (North Macedonia) Xhelil Abdulla
- (North Macedonia) Muharem Bajrami
- (North Macedonia) Argjend Beqiri
- (North Macedonia) Vulnet Emini
- (North Macedonia) Argjent Gafuri
- (North Macedonia) **Besart Ibraimi**
- (North Macedonia) **Agron Memedi**
- (North Macedonia) Visar Musliu
- (North Macedonia) Igor Savevski
- (North Macedonia) Goran Siljanovski
- (North Macedonia) **Metodija Stepanovski**
- (North Macedonia) Vlatko Stojanovski
- (Mauritania) Abdoulaye Sileye Gaye

== Historical list of coaches ==
- (Kosovo) Gani Sejdiu (Jun 2005 – Dec 2005)
- (North Macedonia) Toni Jakimovski (7 Dec 2005 – Jun 2006)
- (North Macedonia) Zoran Smileski (Jul 2006 – Nov 2006)
- (North Macedonia) Vlatko Kostov (1 Dec 2006 – Nov 2007)
- (Kosovo) Bylbyl Sokoli (15 Nov 2007 – Jun 2008)
- (North Macedonia) Vlatko Kostov (Jul 2008 – 14 Jun 2010)
- (North Macedonia) Nexhat Shabani (1 Jul 2010 – 5 Nov 2010)
- (Kosovo) Bylbyl Sokoli (10 Nov 2010 – 29 Jul 2011)
- (North Macedonia) Bujar Islami (30 Jul 2011 – 22 Aug 2011)
- (North Macedonia) Vlatko Kostov (23 Aug 2011 – 12 Aug 2012)
- (Croatia) (North Macedonia) Qatip Osmani (22 Aug 2012 – 1 Jun 2017)
- (North Macedonia) Vlatko Kostov (14 Jun 2017 – 9 Apr 2018)
- (North Macedonia) Agron Memedi & Kushtrim Abdulahu (10 Apr 2018 – 20 Jun 2018)
- (North Macedonia) Jeton Beqiri (21 Jun 2018 – 25 Sep 2018)
- (North Macedonia) Nikola Ilievski (9 Oct 2018 – 30 Jun 2019)
- (North Macedonia) Bujar Islami (1 Jul 2019 – present)
