= Dragan Dimitrovski =

Macedonian footballer

Personal information
- Date of birth: 26 July 1977 (age 49)
- Place of birth: Bitola, SFR Yugoslavia
- Position: Striker

Youth career
- Pelister

Senior career*
Years	Team	Apps	(Gls)
1999–2000	Tikveš	18	(19)
2000–2002	Pelister	64	(38)
2003–2005	Pobeda	77	(57)
2005–2010	Pelister	95	(49)
2010	Pobeda	5	(8)
2010–2011	11 Oktomvri	15	(2)
2011–2013	Pelister	25	(11)

International career^{‡}
2001–2004	Macedonia	14	(2)
- * Club domestic league appearances and goals as of 5 June 2012 ‡ National team caps and goals as of 17 July 2009

Dragan Dimitrovski (Macedonian: Драган Димитровски; born 26 July 1977 in Bitola, Yugoslavia) is a retired Macedonian footballer who last played as a forward for FK Pelister in the Macedonian First League. He has also played for the Macedonian national team.

== Club career ==
In 2009, while playing for Pelister, he scored his 100th league goal in a 3–0 win over Metalurg becoming only the third player to reach 100 league goals in Macedonia. After the match, he would say "I expected to score the 100th goal but not the gift from Čkembari. I promise more goals in the future and trust me, you have not heard the last word from this young team. We won the match easier than expected congrats to all our footballers."

== International career ==
He made his senior debut for Macedonia in a December 2001 friendly match away against Oman and has earned a total of 14 caps, scoring 2 goals. His final international was an August 2004 FIFA World Cup qualification match against Armenia.

== Career statistics ==
=== International ===
Appearances and goals by national team and year
National team	Year	Apps	Goals
Macedonia	2001	1	0
Macedonia	2002	3	0
Macedonia	2003	5	2
Macedonia	2004	5	0
Total		14	2

Scores and results list Macedonia's goal tally first, score column indicates score after each Dimitrovski goal.

List of international goals scored by Dragan Dimitrovski
No.	Date	Venue	Opponent	Score	Result	Competition	Ref.
1	20 August 2003	Stadion Goce Delčev, Prilep, Macedonia	Albania	3–1	3–1	Friendly	
2	10 September 2003	Štadión pod Dubňom, Žilina, Slovakia	Slovakia	1–1	1–1	UEFA Euro 2004 qualifying	

== Honours ==
=== Pelister ===
- Macedonian Cup: 2000–01
- Macedonian Second League: 2005–06, 2011–12

=== Pobeda ===
- Macedonian First League: 2003–04

-the best player in the Macedonian Football League 2003 -top scorer in the Macedonian Football League 2004 with 26 goals

=== 11 Oktomvri ===
- Macedonian Second League: 2010-11
