= FK Makedonija G.P. =

Macedonian association football club

Makedonija GP
- Full name: FK Makedonija Gjorche Petrov
- Nicknames: Лавови (Lions); Жолто-црвени (The Yellow-reds)
- Founded: 1932; 94 years ago
- Ground: Gjorče Petrov Stadium
- Capacity: 3,000
- Owner: Gjorche Petrov Municipality
- Manager: Bobi Bozhinovski
- League: Macedonian Second League
- 2025–26: Macedonian First League, 10th (relegated)
- Website: fkmakedonija.mk
Home colours	Away colours	Third colours

FK Makedonija Gjorche Petrov (Macedonian: ФК Македонија Ѓорче Петров), commonly referred to as Makedonija GP (Macedonian: ФК Македонија Ѓ.П.), is a football club based in the municipality of Gjorche Petrov, in Skopje, North Macedonia. They are currently playing in the Macedonian Second League.

== History ==
The club was founded in 1932 as HASK (Hanrievski amaterski sportski klub). During its history, the club was also known as Lokomotiva, Rudar, Industrijalec, and Jugokokta. The club received its current name in the 1989/90 season in commemoration of Gyorche Petrov, a revolutionary considered an important figure of the Internal Macedonian Revolutionary Organization.

Champions 1991 Makedonija had a great season, with 23 victories 9 losses and only 2 draws. Finishing on the top of the league table in front of traditionally great teams like: Rabotnichki, Belasica, SKOPJE, Tikvesh, Metalurg, KUMANOVO all previous Champions at the time and next season up-coming champion SASA. The title was won mainly because of the great games and victories at the home ground in Gjorche Petrov. That season Makedonija got up on the higher level and established the club as the league favorites.

Makedonija entered the Macedonian First League when Macedonian Republic League transformed into First League in 1992. They were relegated in 1993/94 season. After playing one season in the Macedonian Second League they were back in the top division. In the 1997/98 season they finished third and qualified to play in the Intertoto Cup, where they played against NK Olimpija Ljubljana from Sloveniain the first round, and SC Bastia from France in the second. In the 2001/02 season they were relegated again, and played three seasons in the second division. Makedonija GP returned to the First League in the 2005/06 season with their best performance, finishing second.

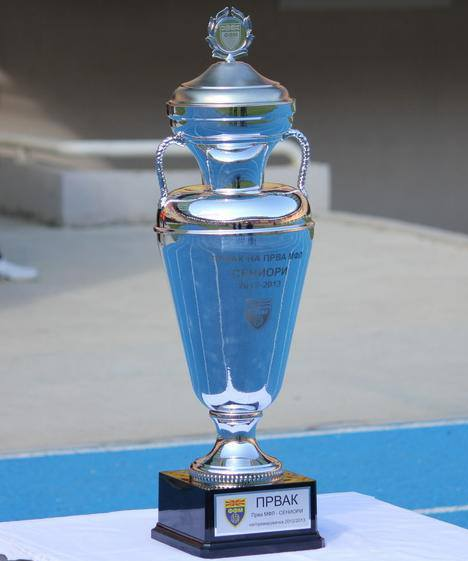
Macedonian First League Trophy 1991, 2009

Cup Winners 2006 In the season 2005-06 FK Makedonija won the National Cup for the first time. In the final first round they had to face FK Ohrid at their famous Bilyana's Springs stadium. FK Makedonija managed to pull out an easy away win 0–3. In the second round they've eliminated FK Napredok on aggregate 4-2, winning the home game 2-0 and drawing away 2-2. The Quarter-finals came and they faced FK Cementarnica winning both matches home and away 1-0 making it 2-0 on aggregate. In the semi-finals they've faced FK Sileks, drawing the first match at home 1-1, while winning the famous game away 2-1 and reaching their first final.

The final game was held at the City Park National Arena. In a thriller match they won their first final by 3-2 with a goal in 92 second minute of stoppage time. The goal scorer was legendary Filip Ivanovski.

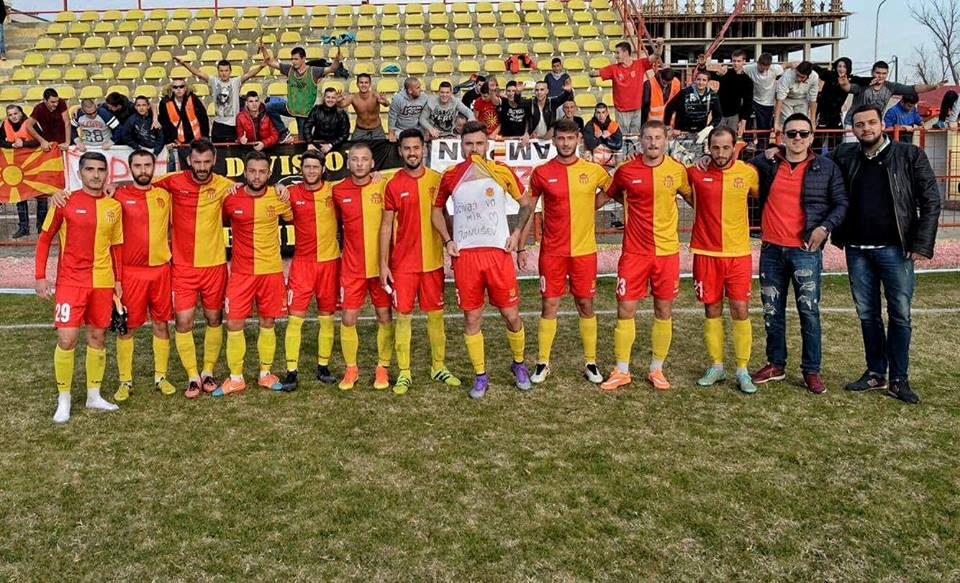
Team Makedonija G.P

They played in the qualifying rounds of the UEFA Cup 2006-07, where they lost to Lokomotiv Sofia 3–1 on aggregate.

Champions 2009 Makedonija had another great season and this time with even more difficult opponents such as: Vardar, Sileks, Pobeda, Pelister, Rabotnichki all numerous times Champions in the decades before. This time Makedonija played great winning both Home and Away games. This season Makedonija managed to reach the European Champions League qualifying stage. They've finished their Marvelous season on the top of the league table by Winning 17 games, 10 draws and only 3 defeats, establishing the reputation of the big team in the domestic league championship.

After Makedonija GP quit the first league at the 2009–10 season, the club was unable to participate at any senior level; however, the club's board took over a third-tier club MFK Treska from the nearby village of Šiševo, moving the team to Makedonija's stadium, and became supported by the old Makedonija's fans. MFK Treska won the Macedonian Third League North promotion play-off in 2010–11, and had been playing in the Macedonian Second League in the 2011–12 season with ambitions to gain promotion to the top flight by sharing the top place on the table after the first round of the season. The name change request was expected for some time now, and the Football Federation of Macedonia, on January 10, 2012, finally accepted the request by MFK Treska to change its name and become officially registered as FK Makedonija Ǵorče Petrov, name under which they will compete for the rest of the season.

Cup Winners 2022-The Shoot Out Champions In the season 2021-22 FK Makedonija won the National Cup. In the Final Round 1 they met FK Detonit and managed easy away Victory 0–3. In the second round they draw away with Akademija Pandev 1-1 and the penalty roulette decided the match, ending 3-5 for FK Makedonija. They had the home ground advantage in the quarter-finals eliminating the Champions. Regular time was a draw 0-0 and after the shootout 4-1 for the hosts. In the semi-finals, they had to play away again. The match finished 0-0, and again they've beat the home side FK Struga after penalty roulette 2-4.
The final match was played at the City Park National Arena. It was a draw after the regular time again finishing 0-0. FK Makedonija managed to beat FK Sileks in the final match after the shoot out this time 4-3.

FK Makedonija did not manage to climb high on the Championship table in the season 2022-23, and they ended up on 7th place. Only top three teams qualify for the European Competitions, so FK Makedonija had to focus on the national Cup. And they managed to defend the title from 2021-22 that brought them European summer again.

Cup Winners 2023-Again in a Shoot Out thriller In the season 2022-23 FK Makedonija won the National Cup again second time in a row. In the first round 1 they managed easy way through by bye as defending champions. In the second round they met Pobeda away, winning 0-2. They had the home ground advantage beating Akademija Pandev by 1-0 in the quarter-finals. In the semi-finals, they met with Tetovo team home drawing 1-1 in a tough equal match. They had to go in a penalty roulette for the heavy victory of 4-3.
The final match was played at the FFM Petar Milosevski ground. They had to face the National league Champions and the best team for this season FK Struga. After the regular time it was a draw again finishing 1-1. FK Makedonija won the final match against Champions FK Struga in a penalty shootout 2-0.

== Honours ==
=== Domestic League ===
- Champions
  - Winners (2): 1990-91, 2008–09

=== Domestic Cup ===
- Macedonian Football Cup
  - Winners (3): 2005-06, 2021–22, 2022–23

== Home Ground ==
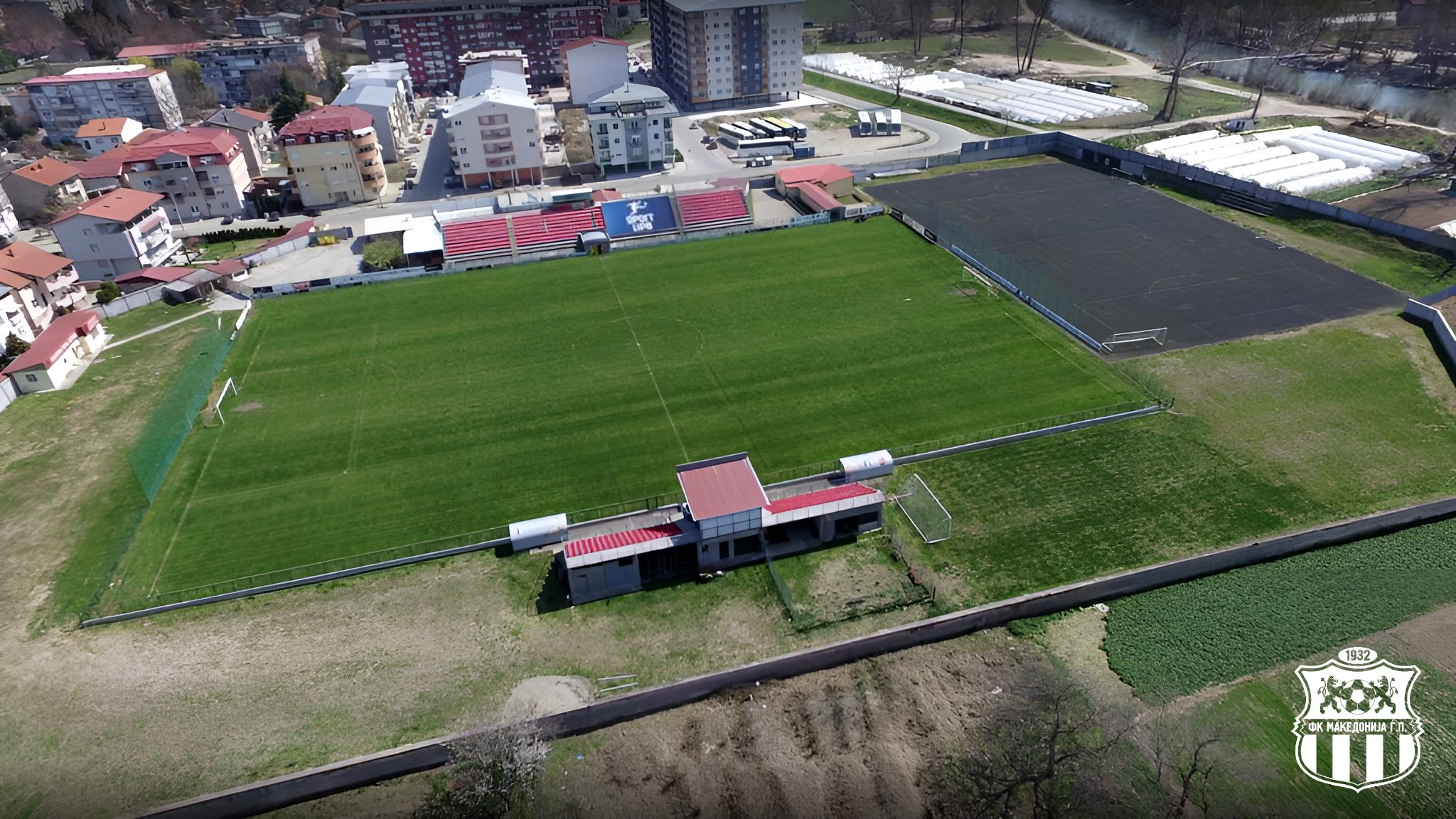
Makedonija home ground

Makedonija plays it's matches at George Petrov Stadium .Gjorče Petrov Stadium (Macedonian: Стадион Ѓорче Петров, English: George Petrov Stadium) is a multi-use stadium in Skopje, Macedonia. The stadium seats 3,000 people.The FK Makedonija pitch in its current location was created after the 1963 earthquake, when the area of the club's previous stadium (then called FK Rudar) was used to build houses for people who had lost their homes.The new stadium was opened in 1971 and had only one stand. In the 2004/2005 season, reconstruction was carried out: a second stand was built, the infrastructure was improved and the capacity of the old stand was increased.

== Recent seasons ==
Logo of Treska

Season	League									Cup	European competitions		Top goalscorer	
Season	Division	P	W	D	L	F	A	Pts	Pos	Cup	European competitions		Player	Goals
1992–93	1. MFL	34	10	12	12	31	51	32	14th					
1993–94	1. MFL	30	2	6	22	17	55	10	16th ↓	R2				
1994–95	2. MFL West	30	9	6	15	31	40	33	1st ↑					
1995–96	1. MFL	28	10	7	11	35	37	37	7th	QF				
1996–97	1. MFL	26	10	4	12	38	30	34	7th	SF			Dragan Mučibabić	12
1997–98	1. MFL	25	12	5	8	34	25	42	3rd	QF			Vlado Trifunov	11
1998–99	1. MFL	29	10	7	9	44	40	37	6th	QF	Intertoto Cup	R2		
1999–00	1. MFL	26	10	6	10	29	28	36	7th	QF			Mario Petkov	11
2000–01	1. MFL	26	9	4	13	46	42	31	10th	R1			Mario Petkov	19
2001–02	1. MFL	20	7	3	10	29	28	24	11th ↓	R2				
2002–03	2. MFL	36	11	9	13	45	39	42	8th	R2				
2003–04	2. MFL	32	15	6	11	50	46	51	7th	R2				
2004–05	2. MFL	33	22	5	6	76	34	71	3rd ↑	R2				
2005–06	1. MFL	33	21	6	6	55	23	69	2nd	W			Filip Ivanovski	22
2006–07	1. MFL	33	18	10	5	65	29	64	3rd	R2	UEFA Cup	QR1	Filip Ivanovski	10
2007–08	1. MFL	33	13	5	15	34	42	24	7th	SF	Intertoto Cup	R2		
2008–09	1. MFL	30	17	10	3	46	15	61	1st	RU			César de Brito	11
2009–10	1. MFL	FFM expelled Makedonija GP from the league							↓	QF	Champions League	QR2	Ivica Gligorovski	14
2010–11^{1}	3. MFL North; Group A	21	15	1	5	61	25	46	1st ↑	PR				
2011–12^{1}	2. MFL	33	14	6	10	48	31	48	4th	R1				
2012–13	2. MFL	30	21	4	5	60	21	67	1st ↑	PR			Vladimir Mojsovski	13
2013–14	1. MFL	33	9	5	19	40	56	32	10th ↓	R2			Ermedin Adem	11
2014–15	2. MFL	27	11	8	8	29	18	41	4th	R1				
2015–16	2. MFL	27	13	7	7	35	33	46	2nd ↑	QF			Kristijan Stojkoski	14
2016–17	1. MFL	36	4	11	21	35	80	23	10th ↓	R1			Alen Jasharoski	12
2017–18	2. MFL West	27	17	5	5	49	23	56	1st ↑	R1			Bobi Bozhinovski	13
2018–19	1. MFL	36	12	11	13	45	50	47	5th	RU			Hristijan Kirovski	11
2019–20^{2}	1. MFL	23	7	8	8	24	28	29	6th	N/A	Europa League	QR1	Padú	7
2020–21	1. MFL	33	16	7	10	53	43	55	4th	SF			Bobi Bozhinovski	8
2021–22	1. MFL	33	17	6	10	46	44	57	4th	W	Conference League	QR2	Ermedin Adem	11
2022–23	1. MFL	30	10	9	11	37	33	39	7th	W	Conference League	QR1	Filip Mishevski	6
2023–24	1. MFL	33	8	5	20	29	44	29	11th ↓	SF	Conference League	QR1	Keith Larson; Krste Velkoski	4
2024–25	2. MFL	30	19	8	3	47	8	65	1st ↑	R2			Simeon Hristov	18
2025–26	1. MFL	33	9	7	17	42	57	34	10th ↓	R2			Exneyder Guerrero	5

^{1} In the 2010–11 and in the autumn part of 2011–12 season the club was competed under the name Treska.

^{2} The 2019–20 season was abandoned due to the COVID-19 pandemic in North Macedonia.

== Makedonija GP in Europe ==
- Q = qualifier
- R1 = first round / R2 = second round

Season	Competition	Round		Club	Score
1998	UEFA Intertoto Cup	R1	(Slovenia)	Olimpija Ljubljana	4–2, 1–1
		R2	(France)	SC Bastia	1–0, 0–7
2006/07	UEFA Cup	Q1	(Bulgaria)	Lokomotiv Sofia	0–2, 1–1
2007	UEFA Intertoto Cup	R1	(Cyprus)	Ethnikos Achnas	0–1, 2–0
		R2	(Bulgaria)	Cherno More Varna	0–4, 0–3
2009/10	UEFA Champions League	Q2	(Belarus)	BATE Borisov	0–2, 0–2
2019/20	UEFA Europa League	Q1	(Armenia)	Alashkert	1–3, 0–3
2022/23	UEFA Europa Conference League	Q2	(Bulgaria)	CSKA Sofia	0–0, 0−4
2023/24	UEFA Europa Conference League	Q1	(Latvia)	RFS	0–1, 1–4

== Players ==
=== Current squad ===
As of 25 June 2026

Note: Flags indicate national team as defined under FIFA eligibility rules; some limited exceptions apply. Players may hold more than one non-FIFA nationality.

No.	Pos.	Nation	Player
1	GK	MKD	Darko Jovchev
2	DF	MKD	Dimitar Martinovski
3	DF	MKD	Mihail Mitrevski
4	DF	MKD	Mihael Jovanovikj
8	MF	MKD	Filip Kostikj
10	MF	MKD	Besmir Ismani
11	MF	MKD	Rijad Murtezani
12	GK	MKD	Darijan Denkovski
13	DF	MKD	Kristijan Tanevski
14	MF	MKD	Konstantin Apostolovski
16	DF	MKD	Kristijan Karulovski
17	MF	MKD	Betim Sadiki
18	MF	MKD	Filip Stefanov
19	MF	MKD	Omer Sulejmani
20	MF	MKD	Trajche Talevski
22	MF	MKD	Marko Blazheski
23	MF	MKD	Borjan Tomovski
31	MF	MKD	Fidan Sherifi
43	FW	MKD	Antian Emini
44	MF	MKD	Alman Etemi

== Historical list of coaches ==
- (North Macedonia) Zoran Stratev (1991–1995)
- (North Macedonia) Kiril Dojčinovski (1999)
- (North Macedonia) Slobodan Goračinov (1999)
- (North Macedonia) Vujadin Stanojković (2000)
- (North Macedonia) Zoran Tanevski (2001)
- (North Macedonia) Baze Lazarevski (2001)
- (North Macedonia) Dobre Dimovski (2001)
- (North Macedonia) Ane Andovski (2002)
- (North Macedonia) Perica Gruevski (2005 – 9 Feb 2006)
- (Serbia) Radmilo Ivančević (10 Feb 2006 – 25 Aug 2007)
- (North Macedonia) Zoran Stratev (2007)
- (North Macedonia) Robert Stojanovski (26 Aug 2007 – 10 Nov 2007)
- (North Macedonia) Ilcho Gjorgioski (11 Nov 2007 – 2010)
- (North Macedonia) Ljupcho Matevski (2012)
- (North Macedonia) Vasko Bozhinovski (2012)
- (North Macedonia) Bobi Stojkoski (2012 – 2013)
- (North Macedonia) Borce Hristov (1 Jul 2013 – 5 Aug 2013)
- (North Macedonia) Gjorgji Todorovski (8 Aug 2013 – 3 Mar 2014)
- (North Macedonia) Marjan Sekulovski (4 Mar 2014 – 5 May 2014)
- (Serbia) Jovica Knežević (1 Jul 2015 – 30 Jun 2016)
- (North Macedonia) Bobi Stojkoski (8 Apr 2016 – 20 Aug 2016)
- (Serbia) Jovica Knežević (1 Jan 2016 – 15 Jun 2018)
- (North Macedonia) Aleksandar Tanevski (1 Jul 2018 – 11 Nov 2019)
- (Kosovo) (Turkey) Naci Şensoy (20 Nov 2019 – 11 Mar 2020)
- (North Macedonia) Zikica Tasevski (12 Mar 2020 – 25 Apr 2021)
- (North Macedonia) Aleksandar Tanevski (26 Apr 2021 – 17 Oct 2021)
- (North Macedonia) Muharem Bajrami (17 Oct 2021 – 9 Mar 2023)
- (Serbia) Goran Simov (13 Mar 2023 – present)
