= 2015–16 in Republic of Macedonia football =

Football in Republic of Macedonia
- Season: 2015–16

Men's football
- First League: Vardar
- Second League: Pobeda
- Third League: Goblen Junior (North); Vardar (N) (South); Akademija Pandev (East); Vardari (West); Novaci 2005 (Southwest)
- Macedonian Cup: Shkëndija
- Super Cup: Vardar

The following article presents a summary of the 2015–16 football season in the Republic of Macedonia, which was the 24th season of competitive football in the country.

== League competitions ==
=== First League ===
==== First phase ====
Pos	Team	Pld	W	D	L	GF	GA	GD	Pts	Qualification
1	Vardar	27	20	5	2	59	15	+44	65	Qualification for the championship round
2	Shkëndija	27	19	6	2	62	21	+41	63	Qualification for the championship round
3	Sileks	27	11	7	9	32	32	0	40	Qualification for the championship round
4	Shkupi	27	9	11	7	28	25	+3	38	Qualification for the championship round
5	Rabotnichki	27	8	12	7	32	26	+6	36	Qualification for the championship round
6	Bregalnica Shtip	27	9	6	12	38	43	−5	33	Qualification for the championship round
7	Horizont Turnovo	27	8	9	10	32	42	−10	33	Qualification for the relegation round
8	Renova	27	8	7	12	33	37	−4	31	Qualification for the relegation round
9	Metalurg	27	4	4	19	20	48	−28	16	Qualification for the relegation round
10	Mladost Carev Dvor	27	5	1	21	18	65	−47	16	Qualification for the relegation round

Source: MacedonianFootball.com, Soccerway
Rules for classification: 1) Points; 2) Goal difference; 3) Goals scored; 4) Head-to-head points; 5) Head-to-head goal difference; 6) Head-to-head away goals scored (only if two teams); 7) Head-to-head goals scored; 8) Draw; 9) Play-off. (Note: Criteria 2, 3 and 8 is only used if not deciding teams for championship or relegation round).

==== Championship group ====
Pos	Team	Pld	W	D	L	GF	GA	GD	Pts	Qualification
1	Vardar (C)	32	25	5	2	67	17	+50	80	Qualification for the Champions League second qualifying round
2	Shkëndija	32	23	6	3	74	24	+50	75	Qualification for the Europa League first qualifying round (Note: Shkëndija qualified for the Europa League first qualifying round by winning the 2015–16 Macedonian Football Cup.)
3	Sileks	32	12	8	12	35	40	−5	44	Qualification for the Europa League first qualifying round
4	Rabotnichki	32	10	13	9	36	30	+6	43	Qualification for the Europa League first qualifying round
5	Bregalnica Shtip	32	10	8	14	42	49	−7	38	
6	Shkupi	32	9	11	12	29	34	−5	38	

Source: MacedonianFootball.com, Soccerway
Rules for classification: 1) Points; 2) Goal difference; 3) Goals scored; 4) Head-to-head points; 5) Head-to-head goal difference; 6) Head-to-head away goals scored (only if two teams); 7) Head-to-head goals scored; 8) Draw; 9) Play-off. (Note: Criteria 2, 3 and 8 is only used if not deciding Champion or teams for UEFA competitions).
(C) Champions

==== Relegation group ====
Pos	Team	Pld	W	D	L	GF	GA	GD	Pts	Relegation
7	Renova	33	13	8	12	49	42	+7	47	
8	Horizont Turnovo (R)	33	12	10	11	45	43	+2	46	Qualification for the relegation play-offs
9	Metalurg (R)	33	5	4	24	27	66	−39	19	Relegation to the Macedonian Second League
10	Mladost Carev Dvor (R)	33	6	1	26	22	81	−59	19	Relegation to the Macedonian Second League

Source: MacedonianFootball.com, Soccerway
Rules for classification: 1) Points; 2) Goal difference; 3) Goals scored; 4) Head-to-head points; 5) Head-to-head goal difference; 6) Head-to-head away goals scored (only if two teams); 7) Head-to-head goals scored; 8) Draw; 9) Play-off. (Note: Criteria 2, 3 and 8 is only used if not deciding teams for relegation).
(R) Relegated

=== Second League ===
Pos	Team	Pld	W	D	L	GF	GA	GD	Pts	Promotion or relegation
1	Pobeda (C, P)	27	13	8	6	40	23	+17	47	Promotion to Macedonian First League
2	Makedonija G.P. (P)	27	13	7	7	35	33	+2	46	Promotion to Macedonian First League
3	Pelister (P)	27	9	12	6	33	32	+1	39	Qualification to Promotion play-off
4	Teteks	27	10	9	8	27	25	+2	39	
5	Vëllazërimi	27	10	8	9	30	30	0	38	
6	Skopje	27	9	9	9	27	23	+4	36	
7	Euromilk Gorno Lisiche	27	9	9	9	26	29	−3	36	
8	Ljubanci (O)	27	9	7	11	32	31	+1	34	Qualification to Relegation play-off
9	Gostivar (R)	27	9	6	12	29	34	−5	33	Relegation to Macedonian Third League
10	Kozhuf Miravci (R)	27	4	5	18	17	36	−19	17	Relegation to Macedonian Third League

Source: MacedonianFootball.com, Soccerway
Rules for classification: 1) Points; 2) Head-to-head points; 3) Head-to-head goal difference; 4) Head-to-head away goals scored
(C) Champions; (O) Play-off winners; (P) Promoted; (R) Relegated

== Macedonian Cup ==
=== Quarter-finals ===
Team 1	Agg.	Team 2	1st leg	2nd leg
Shkëndija (1)	5–1	Vardar (1)	3–0	2–1
Rabotnichki (1)	5–1	Sileks (1)	3–0	2–1
Mladost Carev Dvor (1)	2–5	Bregalnica Shtip (1)	1–1	1–4
Makedonija GP (2)	3–4	Horizont Turnovo (1)	2–4	1–0

=== Semi-finals ===
Team 1	Agg.	Team 2	1st leg	2nd leg
Horizont Turnovo	1–4	Shkëndija	0–2	1–2
Bregalnica Shtip	1–4	Rabotnichki	1–1	0–3

=== Final ===
16 May 2016
20:00 CEST

Shkëndija	2–0	Rabotnichki
Radeski 7'; Júnior 90+5'	Report

Philip II Arena, Skopje
Attendance: 8,000
Referee: Goran Spirkoski (Prilep)

== Macedonian Super Cup ==
23 September 2015
20:00 CEST (UTC+2)

Vardar	1–1 (a.e.t.)	Rabotnički
Ivanovski 11'	Report	Ilijoski 47'
Penalties
Hambardzumyan (penalty scored); Stojkov (penalty scored); Ivanovski (penalty missed); Gligorov (penalty scored); Felipe (penalty scored)	4–3	Cikarski (penalty scored); Vujčić (penalty scored); Ilievski (penalty scored); Altiparmakovski (penalty missed); Ristevski (penalty missed)

Philip II Arena, Skopje
Attendance: 1,500
Referee: Aleksandar Stavrev (Skopje)

== Macedonian clubs in Europe ==
=== Vardar ===
2015–16 UEFA Champions League

14 July 2015 Second qualifying round	APOEL (Cyprus)	0–0	(North Macedonia) Vardar	GSP Stadium, Nicosia
19:00 CEST (UTC+2)		Report		Attendance: 14,531; Referee: Aliyar Aghayev (Azerbaijan)

21 July 2015 Second qualifying round	Vardar (North Macedonia)	1–1 (1–1a agg.)	(Cyprus) APOEL	Philip II Arena, Skopje
20:00 CEST (UTC+2)	Ljamchevski 90+4'	Report	De Vincenti 60'	Attendance: 22,540; Referee: Davide Massa (Italy)

=== Rabotnički ===
2015–16 UEFA Europa League

2 July 2015 First qualifying round	Flora Tallinn (Estonia)	1–0	(North Macedonia) Rabotnički	A. Le Coq Arena, Tallinn
19:00 EEST (UTC+3)	Gussev 59'	Report		Attendance: 1,236; Referee: Mohammed Al-Hakim (Sweden)

9 July 2015 First qualifying round	Rabotnički (North Macedonia)	2–0 (2–1 agg.)	(Estonia) Flora Tallinn	Philip II Arena, Skopje
20:00 CEST (UTC+2)	Anene 48'; Altiparmakovski 54'	Report		Attendance: 1,690; Referee: Markus Hameter (Austria)

16 July 2015 Second qualifying round	Jelgava (Latvia)	1–0	(North Macedonia) Rabotnički	Olympic Sports Center of Zemgale, Jelgava
18:30 EEST (UTC+3)	Kļuškins 87'	Report		Attendance: 1,510; Referee: Tore Hansen (Norway)

23 July 2015 Second qualifying round	Rabotnički (North Macedonia)	2–0 (2–1 agg.)	(Latvia) Jelgava	Philip II Arena, Skopje
20:00 CEST (UTC+2)	Ilijoski 6'; Sahiti 17'	Report		Attendance: 2,300; Referee: István Kovács (Romania)

30 July 2015 Third qualifying round	Rabotnički (North Macedonia)	1–0	(Turkey) Trabzonspor	Philip II Arena, Skopje
21:00 EEST (UTC+3)	Ilijoski 23'	Report		Attendance: 6,200; Referee: Paweł Gil (Poland)

6 August 2015 Third qualifying round	Trabzonspor (Turkey)	1–1 (a.e.t.) (1–2 agg.)	(North Macedonia) Rabotnički	Hüseyin Avni Aker Stadium, Trabzon
19:00 CEST (UTC+2)	Yokuşlu 55'	Report	Markoski 112'	Attendance: 13,704; Referee: Steven McLean (Scotland)

20 August 2015 Play-off round	Rabotnički (North Macedonia)	1–1	(Russia) Rubin Kazan	Philip II Arena, Skopje
20:00 CEST (UTC+2)	Ristevski 85'	Report	Karadeniz 68'	Attendance: 10,000; Referee: István Vad (Hungary)

27 August 2015 Play-off round	Rubin Kazan (Russia)	1–0 (2–1 agg.)	(North Macedonia) Rabotnički	Central Stadium, Kazan (Note: Rubin Kazan played their home match at Central Stadium, Kazan, instead of their regular stadium Kazan Arena, Kazan, as Rubin Kazan's stadium was hosting the 2015 World Aquatics Championships.)
19:00 FET (UTC+3)	Carlos Eduardo 35'	Report		Attendance: 4,231; Referee: Hüseyin Göçek (Turkey)

=== Shkëndija ===
2015–16 UEFA Europa League

2 July 2015 First qualifying round	Shkëndija (North Macedonia)	1–1	(Scotland) Aberdeen	Philip II Arena, Skopje (Note: Shkëndija played their home match at Philip II Arena, Skopje, instead of their regular stadium Gradski stadion, Tetovo.)
21:05 CEST (UTC+2)	Kirovski 84'	Report	McGinn 79'	Attendance: 7,040; Referee: Tolga Ozkalfa (Turkey)

9 July 2015 First qualifying round	Aberdeen (Scotland)	0–0 (1a–1 agg.)	(North Macedonia) Shkëndija	Pittodrie Stadium, Aberdeen
20:45 CEST (UTC+2)		Report		Attendance: 14,112; Referee: Nikolaj Hänni (Switzerland)

=== Renova ===
2015–16 UEFA Europa League

30 June 2015 First qualifying round	Renova (North Macedonia)	0–1	(Moldova) Dacia Chișinău	Philip II Arena, Skopje (Note: Renova played their home match at Philip II Arena, Skopje, instead of their regular stadium Gradski stadion, Tetovo.)
21:00 CEST (UTC+2)		Report	Roșca 12'	Attendance: 1,500; Referee: Eiko Saar (Estonia)

9 July 2015 First qualifying round	Dacia Chișinău (Moldova)	4–1 (5–1 agg.)	(North Macedonia) Renova	CSR Orhei, Orhei (Note: Dacia Chișinău played their home match at CSR Orhei, Orhei, instead of their regular stadium Stadionul Moldova, Speia.)
17:00 CEST (UTC+2)	Cociuc 9'; Jardan 55'; Pavlov 60'; Lozoviy 88'	Report	Emini 32'	Attendance: 800; Referee: Denis Scherbakov (Belarus)

== Macedonian women's clubs in Europe ==
=== ŽFK Dragon 2014 ===
11 August 2015 Qualifying round	NSA Sofia (Bulgaria)	6–0	(North Macedonia) ŽFK Dragon 2014	Seaview, Belfast
14:00 WEST (UTC+1)	Zhekova 15', 37'; Asenova 17'; Koshuleva 27'; Gospodinova 34'; Penkova 70'	Report		Attendance: 22; Referee: Tânia Fernandes Morais (Luxembourg)

13 August 2015 Qualifying round	PAOK (Greece)	10–0	(North Macedonia) ŽFK Dragon 2014	Seaview, Belfast
14:00 WEST (UTC+1)	Dimitriou 37'; Panteliadou 39', 42', 49'; Dimitrijević 45+1', 62'; Kakambouki 51', 66'; Naceva 60' (o.g.); Chatzigiannidou 74' (pen.)	Report		Attendance: 36; Referee: Kseniya Goryacheva (Russia)

16 August 2015 Qualifying round	ŽFK Dragon 2014 (North Macedonia)	0–2	(Northern Ireland) Glentoran Belfast United	Seaview, Belfast
16:00 WEST (UTC+1)		Report	Rogan 31'; Wade 36'	Attendance: 172; Referee: Kseniya Goryacheva (Russia)

== National teams ==
=== Macedonia national team ===
5 September 2015 UEFA Euro 2016 qualifying	Luxembourg	1–0	Macedonia	Stade Josy Barthel, Luxembourg City
18:00 CEST (UTC+2)	Thill 90+2'	Report		Attendance: 1,657; Referee: Simon Lee Evans (Wales)

8 September 2015 UEFA Euro 2016 qualifying	Macedonia	0–1	Spain	Philip II Arena, Skopje
20:45 CEST (UTC+2)		Report	Pachovski 8' (o.g.)	Attendance: 31,657; Referee: Paolo Tagliavento (Italy)

9 October 2015 UEFA Euro 2016 qualifying	Macedonia	0–2	Ukraine	Philip II Arena, Skopje
20:45 CEST (UTC+2)		Report	Seleznyov 59' (pen.); Kravets 87'	Attendance: 1,250; Referee: Ovidiu Hațegan (Romania)

12 October 2015 UEFA Euro 2016 qualifying	Belarus	0–0	Macedonia	Borisov Arena, Barysaw
21:45 FET (UTC+3)		Report		Attendance: 1,545; Referee: Christian Dingert (Germany)

12 November 2015 Friendly	Macedonia	4–1	Montenegro	Philip II Arena, Skopje
18:00 CET (UTC+1)	Shikov 35'; Trajkovski 38' (pen.), 40', 64'	Report	Jovetić 88'	Attendance: 400; Referee: Ivaylo Stoyanov (Bulgaria)

17 November 2015 Friendly	Macedonia	0–1	Lebanon	Philip II Arena, Skopje
13:00 CET (UTC+1)		Report	Oumari 47'	Attendance: 400; Referee: Damir Skomina (Slovenia)

12 December 2015 Friendly (Unofficial)	Macedonia	2–1	First League foreign players	Petar Miloshevski Stadium, Skopje
13:00 CET (UTC+1)	Radeski 26'; Altiparmakovski 89'	Report	Herrera 88'

14 December 2015 Friendly (Unofficial)	Macedonia A (North Macedonia)	0–0	(North Macedonia) Macedonia U-21	Gradski stadion, Veles
13:00 CET (UTC+1)		Report

23 March 2016 Friendly	Slovenia	v	Macedonia	Bonifika Stadium, Koper
18:00 CET (UTC+1)

29 March 2016 Friendly	Macedonia	v	Bulgaria	Philip II Arena, Skopje
19:00 CEST (UTC+2)

2 June 2016 Friendly	Macedonia	v	Iran	Philip II Arena, Skopje

=== Macedonia U-21 national team ===
5 September 2015 UEFA Euro U-21 Champ. qual.	Macedonia	1–0	Ukraine	Petar Miloshevski Stadium, Skopje
16:00 CEST (UTC+2)	Radeski 90+3'	Report		Attendance: 500; Referee: Daniel Stefański (Poland)

7 September 2015 Friendly	Macedonia	3–1	Australia	Petar Miloshevski Stadium, Skopje
16:30 CEST (UTC+2)	Imeri 5'; Angelov 42'; Petkovski 63'	Report	Taggart 16'	Attendance: 400; Referee: Tihomir Pejin (Croatia)

13 October 2015 UEFA Euro U-21 Champ. qual.	Northern Ireland	1–2	Macedonia	Mourneview Park, Lurgan
17:00 WEST (UTC+1)	Doherty 43'	Report	Babunski 46'; Markoski 85'	Attendance: 100; Referee: Sandor Szabo (Hungary)

15 November 2015 UEFA Euro U-21 Champ. qual.	Macedonia	2–2	France	Petar Miloshevski Stadium, Skopje
13:00 CET (UTC+1)	Angelov 19'; Radeski 40'	Report	Haller 65'; Nkoudou 72'	Attendance: 1,500; Referee: Vitali Meshkov (Russia)

12 December 2015 Friendly (Unofficial)	Macedonia	2–0	Horizont Turnovo	Gradski stadion, Veles
	Imeri 62' (pen.); Kochoski 74'	Report

14 December 2015 Friendly (Unofficial)	Macedonia A (North Macedonia)	0–0	(North Macedonia) Macedonia U-21	Gradski stadion, Veles
13:00 CET (UTC+1)		Report

24 March 2016 UEFA Euro U-21 Champ. qual.	Macedonia	v	Iceland	Petar Miloshevski Stadium, Skopje
14:00 CET (UTC+1)		Report

28 March 2016 UEFA Euro U-21 Champ. qual.	France	v	Macedonia	MMArena, Le Mans
21:00 CEST (UTC+2)		Report

27 May 2016 UEFA Euro U-21; Champ. qual.	Ukraine	v	Macedonia	TBD
		Report

=== Macedonia U-19 national team ===
11 August 2015 Friendly	Slovenia	4–0	Macedonia	Sports Park, Slovenska Bistrica
17:00 CEST (UTC+2)	Repas 7'; Alomerović 22' (o.g.); Ivkič 49'; Šušnjara 78'	Report		Referee: Alen Hliš (Slovenia)

13 August 2015 Friendly	Slovenia	0–2	Macedonia	Sports Park, Slovenska Bistrica
17:00 CEST (UTC+2)		Report	Kochoski 40'; Hristov 89'	Referee: Borut Janžekovič (Slovenia)

15 September 2015 Friendly	Macedonia	2–5	Bosnia and Herzegovina	Gjorče Petrov Stadium, Skopje
16:00 CEST (UTC+2)	Petkovski 43', 58'	Report	Kremenović 35', 61', 82'; Osmanković 44'; Matić 90'	Referee: Kostadin Vlaho (Macedonia)

17 September 2015 Friendly	Macedonia	4–1	Bosnia and Herzegovina	Gjorče Petrov Stadium, Skopje
11:00 CEST (UTC+2)	Kochoski 21'; Zdravkovski 47'; Abaz 48'; Petkovski 55' (pen.)	Report	Herić 32' (pen.)	Referee: Faton Mustafi (Macedonia)

8 October 2015 UEFA Euro. U-19 Champ. qual.	England	2–0	Macedonia	Petar Miloshevski Stadium, Skopje
15:00 CEST (UTC+2)	Armstrong 67'; Maitland-Niles 90+4'	Report		Referee: Mete Kalkavan (Turkey)

10 October 2015 UEFA Euro. U-19 Champ. qual.	Italy	3–2	Macedonia	Petar Miloshevski Stadium, Skopje
15:00 CEST (UTC+2)	Vido 11', 69', 71' (pen.)	Report	Alomerović 16'; Jevtoski 34' (pen.)	Referee: Nicolas Laforge (Belgium)

13 October 2015 UEFA Euro. U-19 Champ. qual.	Macedonia	1–2	Finland	Petar Miloshevski Stadium, Skopje
15:00 CEST (UTC+2)	Petkovski 84' (pen.)	Report	Peiponen 56'; Jakonen 69'	Referee: Nicolas Laforge (Belgium)

=== Macedonia women's national team ===
22 October 2015 UEFA Women's; Euro qual.	Macedonia	0–4	Iceland	Petar Miloshevski Stadium, Skopje
13:30 CEST (UTC+2)		Report	M. Viðarsdóttir 9', 29'; Viggósdóttir 12'; Þorsteinsdóttir 17'	Attendance: 200; Referee: Lois Otte (Belgium)

27 October 2015 UEFA Women's; Euro qual.	Macedonia	1–4	Scotland	Petar Miloshevski Stadium, Skopje
13:30 CET (UTC+1)	Rochi 44'	Report	Little 22'; Corsie 27', 28'; Weir 31'	Attendance: 100; Referee: Anastasia Pustovoitova (Russia)

26 November 2015 UEFA Women's Euro qual.	Macedonia	0–2	Belarus	Petar Miloshevski Stadium, Skopje
13:00 CET (UTC+1)		Report	Slesarchik 67'; Avkhimovich 90+3'	Attendance: 193; Referee: Paula Brady (Republic of Ireland)

29 November 2015 UEFA Women's Euro qual.	Scotland	10–0	Macedonia	St Mirren Park, Paisley
15:05 WET (UTC±0)	J. Ross 3', 59', 61', 87'; Love 8', 40', 53'; Beattie 24'; Lauder 27'; Evans 35'	Report		Attendance: 1,304; Referee: Vesna Budimir (Croatia)

12 April 2016 UEFA Women's; Euro qual.	Slovenia	v	Macedonia	Lendava Sports Park, Lendava

3 June 2016 UEFA Women's; Euro qual.	Macedonia	v	Slovenia	Petar Miloshevski Stadium, Skopje

7 June 2016 UEFA Women's; Euro qual.	Iceland	v	Macedonia	TBD
