= 2015–16 Macedonian Football Cup =

Tournament details
- Country: Macedonia
- Dates: 12 August 2015 – 16 May 2016
- Teams: 32

Final positions
- Champions: Shkëndija (1st title)
- Runners-up: Rabotnichki

Tournament statistics
- Matches played: 41
- Goals scored: 157 (3.83 per match)

The 2015–16 Macedonian Football Cup was the 24th season of Macedonia's football knockout competition. Rabotnichki are the defending champions, having won their fourth title in the previous year.

== Competition calendar ==
Round	Date(s)	Fixtures	Clubs	New entries
First Round	12, 13 August 2015	16	32 → 16	32
Second Round	30 September & 21 October 2015	16	16 → 8	none
Quarter-finals	25, 26 November & 2 December 2015	8	8 → 4	none
Semi-finals	2 March & 13 April 2016	4	4 → 2	none
Final	16 May 2016	1	2 → 1	none

== First round ==
The Matches were played on 12 and 13 August 2015.

Team 1	Score	Team 2
12 August 2015
Gorno Lisiche (2)	1–2	Renova (1)
Vulkan (4)	0–3 (w/o)^{1}	Makedonija G.P. (2)
Prevalec (3)	0–4	Sileks (1)
Liria Zagrachani (4)	0–11	Horizont Turnovo (1)
Zajazi (3)	0–4	Shkëndija (1)
Belasica (3)	0–2	Skopje (1)
Ljubanci 1974 (2)	1–1 (4–3 p)	Teteks (2)
Pobeda (2)	1–1 (6–7 p)	Mladost Carev Dvor (1)
Kozhuf Miravci (2)	0–1	Vardar (1)
Drita (3)	0–3 (w/o)	Vëllazërimi 77 (2)
Poeshevo (3)	0–0 (3–5 p)	Gostivar (2)
Malesh (4)	1–9	Metalurg (1)
Ljuboten (4)	1–5	Shkupi (1)
13 August 2015
Fortuna (3)	0–11	Rabotnichki (1)
11 Oktomvri (3)	0–8	Pelister (2)
Plachkovica (3)	0–2	Bregalnica Shtip (1)

^{1}The match was awarded to Makedonija G.P. because as the Vulkan players not showing at the pitch in the second half, when they were leading 2–0 after the first half.

== Second round ==
Entering this round are the 16 winners from the first round. The draw was held on 1 September 2015. The first legs were played on 30 September and the second legs were played on 21 October 2015.

Team 1	Agg.	Team 2	1st leg	2nd leg
Vardar (1)	6–1	Pelister (2)	4–1	2–0
Shkëndija (1)	7–0	Metalurg (1)	2–0	5–0
Gostivar (2)	0–8	Rabotnichki (1)	0–4	0–4
Renova (2)	2–5	Sileks (1)	1–2	1–3
Bregalnica Shtip (1)	2–1	Shkupi (1)	2–0	0–1
Horizont Turnovo (1)	5–3	Skopje (2)	3–1	2–2
Velazerimi (2)	5–7	Mladost Carev Dvor (1)	2–4	3–3
Makedonija G.P. (2)	3–2	Ljubanci 1974 (2)	3–2	0–0

== Quarter-finals ==
Entering this round are the 8 winners from the second round. The first legs were played on 25 and 26 November and the second legs were played on 2 December 2015.

=== Summary ===
Team 1	Agg.	Team 2	1st leg	2nd leg
Shkëndija (1)	5–1	Vardar (1)	3–0	2–1
Rabotnichki (1)	5–1	Sileks (1)	3–0	2–1
Mladost Carev Dvor (1)	2–5	Bregalnica Shtip (1)	1–1	1–4
Makedonija G.P. (2)	3–4	Horizont Turnovo (1)	2–4	1–0

=== Matches ===
26 November 2015
13:00 CET

Shkëndija (1)	3–0	Vardar (1)
Júnior 22'; Cuculi 41'; Radeski 90'

Gradski stadion, Tetovo
Referee: Aleksandar Stavrev (Skopje)
2 December 2015
13:00 CET

Vardar (1)	1–2	Shkëndija (1)
Mijušković 60'		Júnior 43'; Kirovski 82'

Stadion Gjorche Petrov, Skopje
Referee: Dimitar Mechkarovski (Skopje)

Shkëndija won 5–1 on aggregate.

25 November 2015
13:00 CET

Rabotnichki (1)	3–0	Sileks (1)
Altiparmakovski 55'; Ilijoski 68'; Vujčić 82' (pen.)

Gradski stadion, Veles
Referee: Stevche Shulevski (Ohrid)
2 December 2015
13:00 CET

Sileks (1)	1–2	Rabotnichki (1)
Marikj 60' (pen.)		Altiparmakovski 13'; Markoski 75' (pen.)

Gradski stadion, Kratovo
Referee: Faton Mustafi (Tetovo)

Rabotnichki won 5–1 on aggregate.

25 November 2015
13:00 CET

Mladost Carev Dvor (1)	1–1	Bregalnica Shtip (1)
Cvetanoski 45'		Ristovski 80'

SRC Biljanini Izvori, Ohrid
Referee: Faton Mustafi (Tetovo)
2 December 2015
13:00 CET

Bregalnica Shtip (1)	4–1	Mladost Carev Dvor (1)
Mishev 27'; Zdravkov 36' (pen.); Stojanov 57'; Nikovski 74'		Merko 85'

Stadion Nikola Mantov, Kochani
Referee: Marjan Gocevski (Strumica)

Bregalnica Shtip won 5–2 on aggregate.

25 November 2015
13:00 CET

Makedonija G.P. (1)	2–4	Horizont Turnovo (1)
Shajnoski 62'; Stojkoski 90'		Stoilov 17'; Imeri 67', 72'; Bozhinov 82'

Stadion Gjorche Petrov, Skopje
Referee: Marjan Eckoski (Ohrid)
2 December 2015
13:00 CET

Horizont Turnovo (1)	0–1	Makedonija G.P. (1)
		Kostovski 29'

Stadion Kukush, Turnovo
Referee: Dalibor Gjorgjevski (Kumanovo)

Horizont Turnovo won 4–3 on aggregate.

== Semi-finals ==
The first legs were played on 2 March 2016 and the return legs on 13 April 2016.

=== Summary ===
Team 1	Agg.	Team 2	1st leg	2nd leg
Horizont Turnovo (1)	1–4	Shkëndija (1)	0–2	1–2
Bregalnica Shtip (1)	1–4	Rabotnichki (1)	1–1	0–3

=== Matches ===
2 March 2016
14:00 CET

Horizont Turnovo (1)	0–2	Shkëndija (1)
		Ibraimi 11'; Radeski 51'

Stadion Kukuš, Turnovo
Attendance: 1,000
Referee: Aleksandar Stavrev (Skopje)
13 April 2016
16:00 CEST

Shkëndija (1)	2–1	Horizont Turnovo (1)
Juffo 45+1' (pen.); Nexhipi 57'		Timov 56'

Gradski stadion, Tetovo
Attendance: 4,000
Referee: Goran Spirkoski (Prilep)

Shkëndija won 4–1 on aggregate.

2 March 2016
14:00 CET

Bregalnica Shtip (1)	1–1	Rabotnichki (1)
Nacev 63'		Altiparmakovski 73' (pen.)

Stadion Nikola Mantov, Kochani
Attendance: 300
Referee: Dimitar Mechkarovski (Skopje)
13 April 2016
16:00 CEST

Rabotnichki (1)	3–0	Bregalnica Shtip (1)
Altiparmakovski 21', 59'; Elmas 85'

Philip II Arena, Skopje
Attendance: 300
Referee: Marjan Markoski (Ohrid)

Rabotnichki won 4–1 on aggregate.

== Final ==
16 May 2016
20:00 CEST

Shkëndija (1)	2–0	Rabotnichki (1)
Radeski 7'; Júnior 90+5'	Report

Philip II Arena, Skopje
Attendance: 8,000
Referee: Goran Spirkoski (Prilep)

== Season statistics ==
=== Top scorers ===
As of 17 May 2016.

Rank	Player	Club	Goals
1	(North Macedonia) Marjan Altiparmakovski	Rabotnichki	9
2	(North Macedonia) Marjan Radeski	Shkendija	5
3	(North Macedonia) Blazhe Ilijoski	Rabotnichki	4
3	(North Macedonia) Gjorgi Stoilov	Horizont Turnovo	4
3	(North Macedonia) Demir Imeri	Horizont Turnovo	4
3	(North Macedonia) Hristijan Kirovski	Shkendija	4
7	(Brazil) Stênio Júnior	Shkendija	3
7	(North Macedonia) Antonio Kalanoski	Mladost	3
7	(North Macedonia) Kristijan Kostovski	Makedonija GP	3
7	(North Macedonia) Goran Zdravkov	Bregalnica	3
7	(North Macedonia) Gjorgji Tanushev	Bregalnica	3
7	(North Macedonia) Boban Marikj	Sileks	3
7	(North Macedonia) Blagojče Glavevski	Pelister	3

== See also ==
- 2015–16 Macedonian First Football League
- 2015–16 Macedonian Second Football League
- 2015–16 Macedonian Third Football League
