= 2012 Slovenian Football Cup final =

Football match

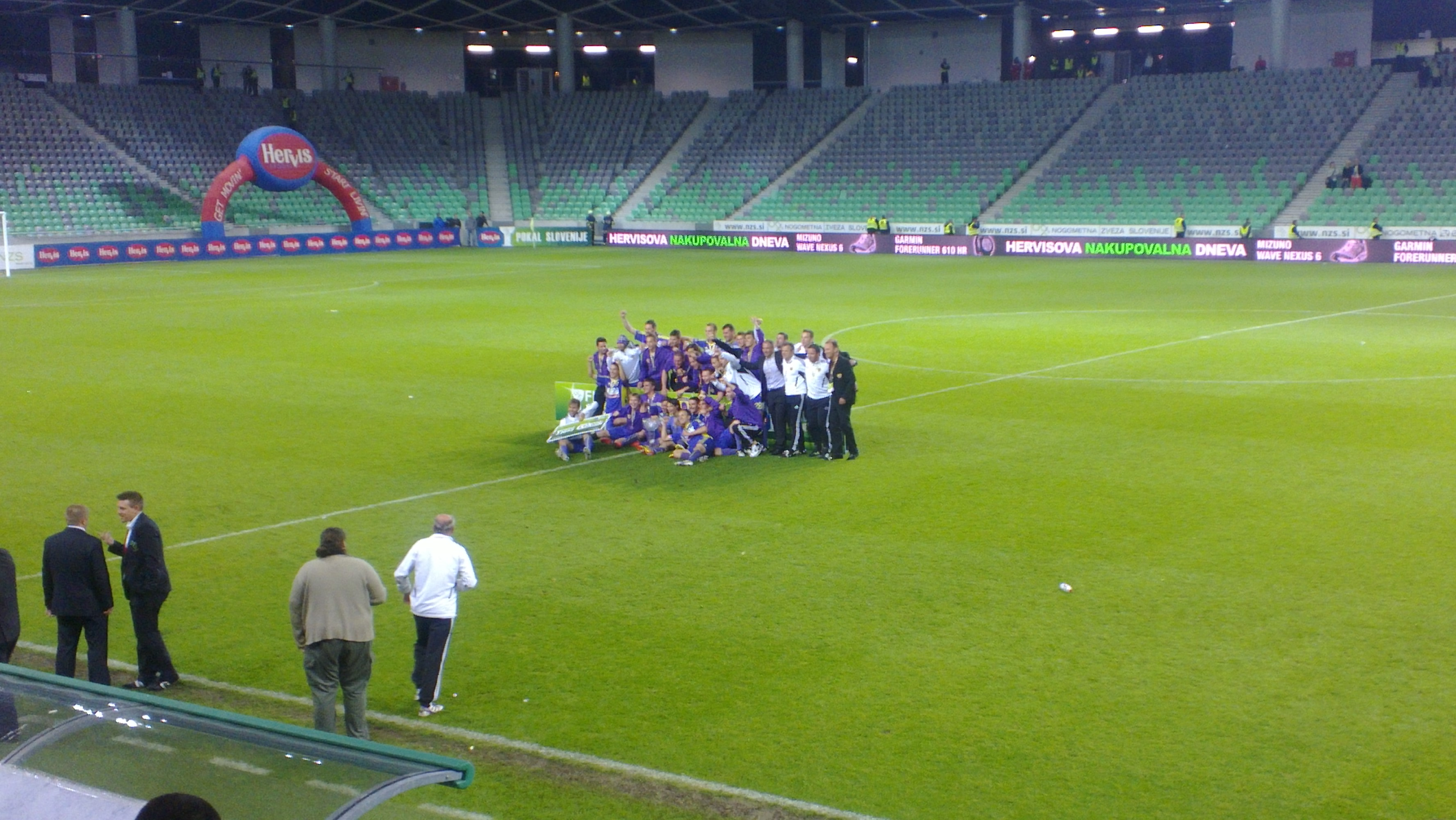
- Event: 2011–12 Slovenian Football Cup
Celje	Maribor
2	2
- After extra time. Maribor won 3–2 on penalties.
- Date: 23 May 2012
- Venue: Stožice Stadium, Ljubljana
- Referee: Matej Jug
- Attendance: 4,132

The 2012 Slovenian Cup final was a football match played between Celje and Maribor on 23 May 2012 at the Stožice Stadium, Ljubljana. It was the final match of the 2011–12 Slovenian Football Cup, the 21st season of Slovenia's football knockout competition, the Slovenian Football Cup. Celje were participating in their sixth final; they had previously won one and lost four. Maribor were appearing in their tenth final; they had previously won six and lost three.

Celje entered the competition in the first round and Maribor in the second (round of 16) after receiving a bye as one of the top four clubs in the 2010–11 Slovenian PrvaLiga. Matches up to the quarter-finals were contested on a one-off basis, with extra time and penalties being played if a match ended in a draw. The quarter-finals and semi-finals were played over two legs. To reach the final Celje defeated Grad, Triglav Kranj, Interblock and Šenčur. Maribor's route to the final comprised victories over Adria, Zavrč and Rudar Velenje.

Watched by a crowd of 4,132, Alen Romih scored in the 36th minute giving Celje the lead at the end of the first half. Dalibor Volaš was substituted on at the start of the second half and equalised for Maribor in under a minute. The score remained 1–1 after 90 minutes and the game went to extra time. Within a minute of the start Celje restored their lead through Benjamin Verbič. Maribor levelled the scores for a second time in the 99th minute with Matic Črnic scoring. At full-time with the score being 2–2, the cup winners were to be decided by a penalty shoot-out. Celje missed three of their five penalties while Maribor converted three of five to win the shoot-out 3–2.

The victory meant Maribor won the Slovenian Football Cup for the seventh time. They later played against their Eternal derby rivals, the 2011–12 Slovenian PrvaLiga runners-up, Olimpija Ljubljana in the 2012 Slovenian Supercup. Given Maribor had already qualified for Europe as league champions, their UEFA Europa League spot was awarded to runners-up Celje.

== Route to the final ==
=== Celje ===
Round	Opponents	Venue	Score
R1	Grad	A	3–1
R2	Triglav Kranj	A	1–0
QF	Interblock	A H	0–2 7–0
SF	Šenčur	A H	1–1 1–1 (8–7 pen.)

Celje entered the competition in the first round. They were drawn away to Slovenian Third League side Grad. Goals from Saša Bakarič and Dejan Krljanović gave Celje a 2–0 lead at half-time; each team scored one goal in the second half with Celje winning 3–1. Their second round (round of 16) draw was away to fellow PrvaLiga side Triglav Kranj. Iztok Močivnik's twelfth-minute goal was enough for Celje to progress through. Their quarter-final opponents were Second League side Interblock. The first leg was played at Interblock's home stadium. Second half goals from Andraž Šporar and Maximiliano Klebčar gave the home side a surprise 2–0 advantage going into the second leg. Within 22 minutes of the second match Celje scored twice to wipe out Interblock's advantage and went on to win the match 7–0 to reach the semi-finals. Celje's final tie before the final was against Second League side Šenčur; with Šenčur at home first. In both legs Celje game from a goal down to draw 1–1, the second leg remained at 1–1 after extra time and Celje won the subsequent penalty shootout 8–7.

=== Maribor ===
Round	Opponents	Venue	Score
R2	Adria	A	2–0
QF	Zavrč	A H	1–1 1–0
SF	Rudar Velenje	A H	4–2 4–2

As one of the top four clubs in the 2010–11 Slovenian PrvaLiga Maribor were given a bye into the second round. They were drawn away to Third League side Adria. A goal from Zoran Lesjak in the first half and Dalibor Volaš in the second saw Maribor win 2–0 to qualify for the quarter-finals. Their first two legged tie of the competition was against Zavrč also of the Third League. The first match ended 1–1 and a 76th-minute goal from Etien Velikonja in the second match was enough for Maribor to reach the semi-finals. Fellow PrvaLiga member Rudar Velenje were Maribor's last tie before the final. They won both legs (away first) 4–2 with forward Etien Velikonja scoring a brace in each. The 8–4 aggregate score is the highest scoring semi-final of the competition with 12 goals breaking the 11 goals record in the 2009–10 semi-final between Celje and Maribor.

== Match ==
=== Details ===
23 May 2012
20:45 CEST

Celje	2–2 (a.e.t.)	Maribor
Romih 36'; Verbič 92'	Report	Volaš 46'; Črnic 99'
Penalties
Verbič (penalty missed); Gobec (penalty scored); Bezjak (penalty missed); Romih (penalty scored); Centrih (penalty missed)	2–3	(penalty missed) Cvijanović; (penalty scored) Rajčević; (penalty scored) Volaš; (penalty missed) Mejač; (penalty scored) Tavares

Stožice, Ljubljana
Attendance: 4,132
Referee: Matej Jug

Celje	Maribor

GK	1	(Bosnia and Herzegovina) Amel Mujčinović
	26	(Slovenia) Matej Centrih
	88	(Slovenia) Klemen Medved	(yellow card) 22'	(substituted off) 48'
	15	(Slovenia) Bekim Kapić	(yellow card) 59'
	25	(Slovenia) Sebastjan Gobec	(yellow card) 86'
	13	(Slovenia) Saša Bakarič
	28	(Slovenia) Marijo Moćić	(red card) 119'	(substituted off) 100'
	3	(Slovenia) Saša Kovjenić		(substituted off) 57'
	8	(Slovenia) Alen Romih	(yellow card) 36'
	21	(North Macedonia) Stefan Ristovski	(yellow card) 15'
	11	(Slovenia) Roman Bezjak
Substitutes:
GK	31	(Slovenia) Matic Kotnik
	14	(Slovenia) Jure Škafar		(substituted on) 48'
	19	(Slovenia) Benjamin Verbič	(yellow card) 92'	(substituted on) 57'
	9	(Slovenia) Tadej Kotnik	(yellow card) 110'	(substituted on) 100'
	18	(Slovenia) David Bezovnik
	23	(Slovenia) Tadej Gaber
	30	(Slovenia) Tadej Vidmajer
Manager:
(Slovenia) Damijan Romih

GK	12	(Slovenia) Marko Pridigar
26	(Slovenia) Aleksander Rajčević
28	(Slovenia) Mitja Viler	(yellow card) 88'
7	(Slovenia) Aleš Mejač	(yellow card) 36'
44	(Brazil) Arghus
20	(Slovenia) Goran Cvijanović	(yellow card) 94'
8	(Croatia) Dejan Mezga	(substituted off) 67'
70	(Slovenia) Aleš Mertelj
11	(Slovenia) Etien Velikonja	(substituted off) 91'
10	(North Macedonia) Agim Ibraimi	(yellow card) 13' (yellow-red card) 117'
32	(Slovenia) Robert Berić	(substituted off) 46'
Substitutes:
GK	33	(Slovenia) Jasmin Handanović
17	(Slovenia) Dalibor Volaš	(yellow card) 110'	(substituted on) 46'
9	(Brazil) Marcos Tavares	(substituted on) 67'
92	(Slovenia) Matic Črnic	(substituted on) 91'
36	(Slovenia) Aleš Majer
4	(Slovenia) Jovan Vidović
5	(Slovenia) Željko Filipović
Manager:
(Slovenia) Darko Milanič
