= Destan =

Destan may refer to:

== Business and entertainment ==
- Destan (TV series), a Turkish drama series

== People ==
=== Surname ===
- Ebru Destan (born 1977), Turkish actress and singer
- Enis Destan (born 2002), Turkish footballer

=== Given name ===
- Destan Bajselmani (born 1999), Kosovo footballer
- Destan Haciya (born 1993), Macedonian footballer

== See also ==
- Dastan, a form of oral history
