= Bakarić =

Bakarić is a surname. Notable people with the surname include:

- Frano Bakarić (born 1977), Croatian sprinter
- Saša Bakarić (born 1987), Slovenian football player
- Vladimir Bakarić (1912–1983), Yugoslav Croatian politician
