= Destan Haciya =

Macedonian footballer

Personal information
- Full name: Destan Haciya; Дестан Хаџија
- Date of birth: 2 August 1993 (age 33)
- Place of birth: Skopje, Republic of Macedonia
- Height: 1.85 m (6 ft 1 in)
- Position: Forward

Senior career*
Years	Team	Apps	(Gls)
2011–2015	Rabotnički	0	(0)
2015–2016	Ljubanci 1974		
2016–2017	Makedonija	17	(1)
2017–2018	Borac Čačak	12	(0)
- * Club domestic league appearances and goals as of 16 December 2017

Destan Haciya, also spelled as Destan Hadzhija or Destan Hadžija (Macedonian: Дестан Хаџија, born 2 August 1993) is a Macedonian football striker of Turkish descent.

== Club career ==
Born in Macedonian capital Skopje, Haciya played with FK Rabotnički between 2011 and 2015. In summer 2015 he joined lower-league side FK Ljubanci 1974 but during the winter-break he was brought by FK Makedonija Gjorče Petrov playing with them the second half of the 2016–17 Macedonian First Football League. Makedonija finished bottom and was relegated, but since Haciya was regular in the squad, he got attention from other clubs. It will be Serbian side FK Borac Čačak that will sign him after trials on 30 August 2017. Haciya made his debut for Borac in the 2017–18 Serbian SuperLiga on 24 September, as a substitute in an away game against FK Čukarički.
