= 2015–16 UEFA Champions League =

European football tournament

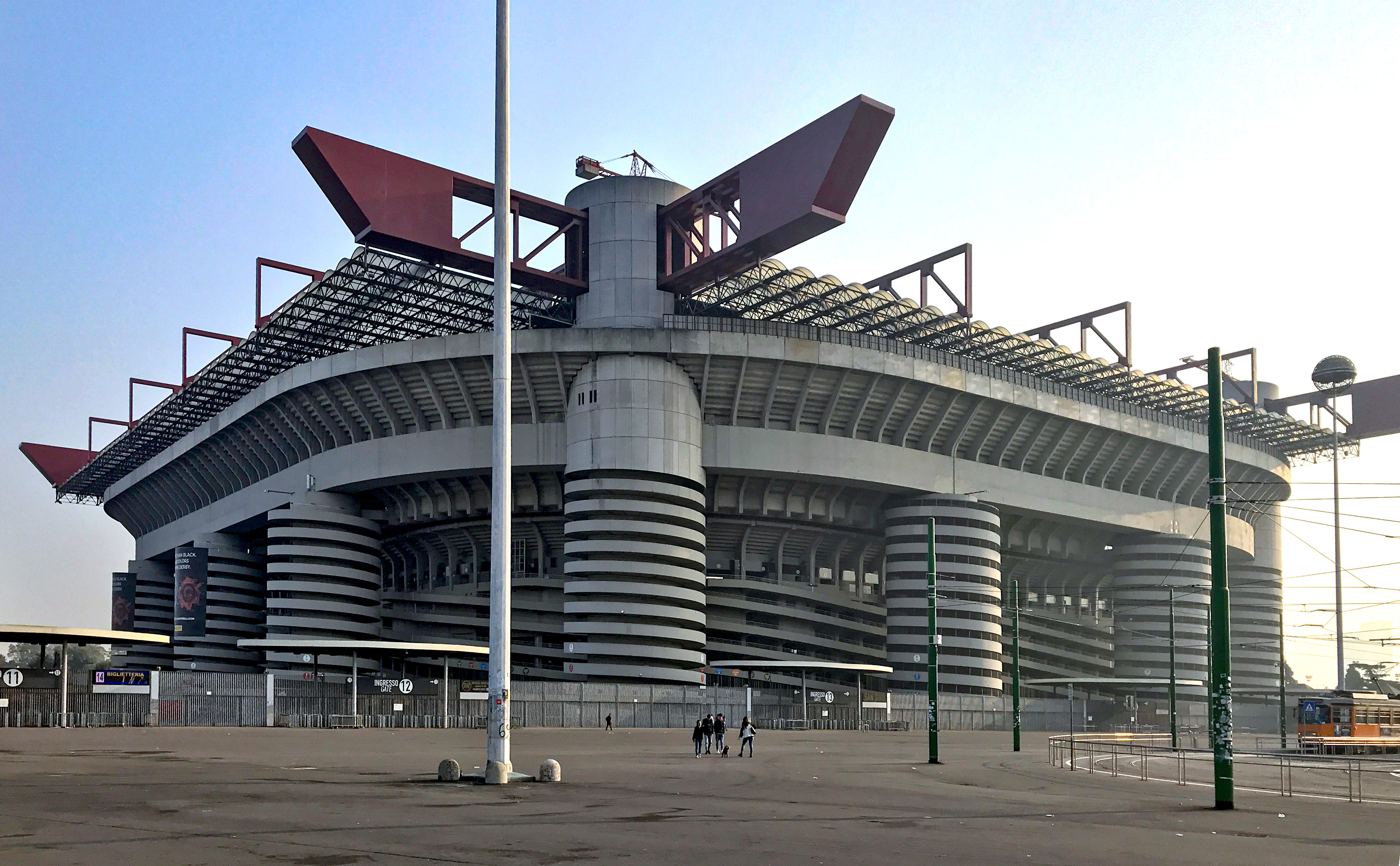
- The Stadio San Siro in Milan hosted the final

Tournament details
- Dates: Qualifying: 30 June – 26 August 2015; Competition proper: 15 September 2015 – 28 May 2016
- Teams: Competition proper: 32; Total: 78 (from 53 associations)

Final positions
- Champions: (Spain) Real Madrid (11th title)
- Runners-up: (Spain) Atlético Madrid

Tournament statistics
- Matches played: 125
- Goals scored: 347 (2.78 per match)
- Attendance: 5,114,427 (40,915 per match)
- Top scorer(s): Cristiano Ronaldo (Real Madrid); 16 goals

The 2015–16 UEFA Champions League was the 61st season of Europe's premier club football tournament organised by UEFA, and the 24th season since it was renamed from the European Champion Clubs' Cup to the UEFA Champions League. Barcelona were the title holders, but were eliminated by Atlético Madrid in the quarter-finals.

The final was played between Real Madrid and Atlético Madrid at the Stadio San Siro in Milan, Italy, with Real defeating Atlético 5–3 on penalties (1–1 after extra time) to win a record-extending eleventh European Cup/Champions League title. It was the second time in the tournament's history that both finalists were from the same city, after the same clubs faced each other in the 2014 final.

As the winners of the 2015–16 UEFA Champions League, Real Madrid qualified as the UEFA representative for the 2016 FIFA Club World Cup in Japan (their third Club World Cup appearance), and also earned the right to play against the winners of the 2015–16 UEFA Europa League, Sevilla, in the 2016 UEFA Super Cup. Madrid won both competitions.

== Format changes ==
The UEFA Executive Committee held in May 2013 approved the following changes to the UEFA Champions League starting from the 2015–16 season (for the three-year cycle until the 2017–18 season):

- The winners of the previous season's UEFA Europa League will qualify for the UEFA Champions League. They will enter at least the play-off round, and will enter the group stage if the berth reserved for the Champions League title holders is not used.
- The previous limit of a maximum of four teams per association will be increased to five, meaning that if the Champions League title holders or the Europa League title holders are from the top three ranked associations (but not both from the same one) and finish outside the top four of their domestic league, the fourth-placed team of their association will not be prevented from participating in the tournament. However, if both the Champions League title holders and the Europa League title holders are from the same top three ranked association and finish outside the top four of their domestic league, the fourth-placed team of their association will be moved to the Europa League.

== Association team allocation ==
A total of 78 teams from 53 of the 54 UEFA member associations participated in the 2015–16 UEFA Champions League (the exception being Liechtenstein, which does not organise a domestic league). The association ranking based on the UEFA country coefficients was used to determine the number of participating teams for each association:

- Associations 1–3 each have four teams qualify.
- Associations 4–6 each have three teams qualify.
- Associations 7–15 each have two teams qualify.
- Associations 16–54 (except Liechtenstein) each have one team qualify.
- The winners of the 2014–15 UEFA Champions League and 2014–15 UEFA Europa League were each given an additional entry if they would not qualify for the 2015–16 UEFA Champions League through their domestic league. Because a maximum of five teams from one association can enter the UEFA Champions League, if both the Champions League title holders and the Europa League title holders were from the same top three ranked association and finished outside the top four of their domestic league, the fourth-placed team of their association would be moved to the Europa League. For this season:
  - The winners of the 2014–15 UEFA Champions League, Barcelona, qualified through their domestic league, meaning the additional entry for the Champions League title holders was not necessary.
  - The winners of the 2014–15 UEFA Europa League, Sevilla, did not qualify through their domestic league, meaning the additional entry for the Europa League title holders was necessary.

=== Association ranking ===
For the 2015–16 UEFA Champions League, the associations are allocated places according to their 2014 UEFA country coefficients, which takes into account their performance in European competitions from 2009–10 to 2013–14.

Apart from the allocation based on the country coefficients, associations may have additional teams participating in the Champions League, as noted below:

- (EL) – Additional berth for Europa League title holders

Rank	Association	Coeff.	Teams	Notes
1	Spain	97.713	4	+1 (EL)
2	England	84.748	4	
3	Germany	81.641	4	
4	Italy	66.938	3	
5	Portugal	62.299	3	
6	France	56.500	3	
7	Russia	46.998	2	
8	Netherlands	44.312	2	
9	Ukraine	40.966	2	
10	Belgium	36.300	2	
11	Turkey	34.200	2	
12	Greece	33.600	2	
13	Switzerland	33.225	2	
14	Austria	30.925	2	
15	Czech Republic	29.350	2	
16	Romania	27.257	1	
17	Israel	26.875	1	
18	Cyprus	23.250	1	

Rank	Association	Coeff.	Teams	Notes
19	Denmark	21.300	1	
20	Croatia	19.625	1	
21	Poland	18.875	1	
22	Belarus	18.625	1	
23	Scotland	16.566	1	
24	Sweden	16.325	1	
25	Bulgaria	15.625	1	
26	Norway	14.275	1	
27	Serbia	14.125	1	
28	Hungary	11.625	1	
29	Slovenia	11.000	1	
30	Slovakia	11.000	1	
31	Moldova	10.375	1	
32	Azerbaijan	10.375	1	
33	Georgia	9.875	1	
34	Kazakhstan	8.250	1	
35	Bosnia and Herzegovina	7.500	1	
36	Finland	7.175	1	

Rank	Association	Coeff.	Teams	Notes
37	Iceland	6.750	1	
38	Latvia	6.250	1	
39	Montenegro	6.000	1	
40	Albania	5.500	1	
41	Lithuania	5.250	1	
42	Macedonia	5.250	1	
43	Republic of Ireland	5.125	1	
44	Luxembourg	4.875	1	
45	Malta	4.833	1	
46	Liechtenstein	4.500	0	
47	Northern Ireland	3.625	1	
48	Wales	3.000	1	
49	Armenia	2.875	1	
50	Estonia	2.875	1	
51	Faroe Islands	2.125	1	
52	San Marino	0.999	1	
53	Andorra	0.833	1	
54	Gibraltar	0.000	1	

=== Distribution ===
In the default access list, the Champions League title holders enter the group stage. However, since Barcelona already qualified for the group stage (as the champions of the 2014–15 La Liga), the Champions League title holders berth in the group stage is given to the Europa League title holders, Sevilla and the following changes to the default allocation system are made:

- The third-placed teams of associations 4 (Italy) and 5 (Portugal) are promoted from the third qualifying round to the play-off round.

		Teams entering in this round	Teams advancing from previous round
First qualifying round (8 teams)		8 champions from associations 47–54	
Second qualifying round (34 teams)		30 champions from associations 16–46 (except Liechtenstein)	4 winners from the first qualifying round
Third qualifying round	Champions Route (20 teams)	3 champions from associations 13–15	17 winners from the second qualifying round
Third qualifying round	League Route (10 teams)	9 runners-up from associations 7–15; 1 third-placed team from association 6	
Play-off round	Champions Route (10 teams)		10 winners from the third qualifying round (Champions Route)
Play-off round	League Route (10 teams)	2 third-placed teams from associations 4–5; 3 fourth-placed teams from associations 1–3	5 winners from the third qualifying round (League Route)
Group stage (32 teams)		Europa League title holders; 12 champions from associations 1–12; 6 runners-up from associations 1–6; 3 third-placed teams from associations 1–3	5 winners from the play-off round (Champions Route); 5 winners from the play-off round (League Route)
Knockout phase (16 teams)			8 group winners from the group stage; 8 group runners-up from the group stage

=== Teams ===
League positions of the previous season qualified via league position shown in parentheses. Sevilla qualified as Europa League title holders. (TH: Champions League title holders; EL: Europa League title holders).

Group stage
(Spain) Barcelona (1st)^{TH}	(England) Arsenal (3rd)	(Portugal) Benfica (1st)	(Ukraine) Dynamo Kyiv (1st)
(Spain) Real Madrid (2nd)	(Germany) Bayern Munich (1st)	(Portugal) Porto (2nd)	(Belgium) Gent (1st)
(Spain) Atlético Madrid (3rd)	(Germany) VfL Wolfsburg (2nd)	(France) Paris Saint-Germain (1st)	(Turkey) Galatasaray (1st)
(Spain) Sevilla (EL)	(Germany) Borussia Mönchengladbach (3rd)	(France) Lyon (2nd)	(Greece) Olympiacos (1st)
(England) Chelsea (1st)	(Italy) Juventus (1st)	(Russia) Zenit Saint Petersburg (1st)	
(England) Manchester City (2nd)	(Italy) Roma (2nd)	(Netherlands) PSV Eindhoven (1st)	
Play-off round
Champions Route	League Route		
	(Spain) Valencia (4th)	(Germany) Bayer Leverkusen (4th)	(Portugal) Sporting CP (3rd)
	(England) Manchester United (4th)	(Italy) Lazio (3rd)	
Third qualifying round
Champions Route	League Route		
(Switzerland) Basel (1st)	(France) Monaco (3rd)	(Belgium) Club Brugge (2nd)	(Austria) Rapid Wien (2nd)
(Austria) Red Bull Salzburg (1st)	(Russia) CSKA Moscow (2nd)	(Turkey) Fenerbahçe (2nd)	(Czech Republic) Sparta Prague (2nd)
(Czech Republic) Viktoria Plzeň (1st)	(Netherlands) Ajax (2nd)	(Greece) Panathinaikos (2nd)	
	(Ukraine) Shakhtar Donetsk (2nd)	(Switzerland) Young Boys (2nd)	
Second qualifying round
(Romania) Steaua București (1st)	(Sweden) Malmö FF (1st)	(Azerbaijan) Qarabağ (1st)	(Albania) Skënderbeu (1st)
(Israel) Maccabi Tel Aviv (1st)	(Bulgaria) Ludogorets Razgrad (1st)	(Georgia (country)) Dila Gori (1st)	(Lithuania) Žalgiris (1st)
(Cyprus) APOEL (1st)	(Norway) Molde (1st)	(Kazakhstan) Astana (1st)	(North Macedonia) Vardar (1st)
(Denmark) Midtjylland (1st)	(Serbia) Partizan (1st)	(Bosnia and Herzegovina) Sarajevo (1st)	(Republic of Ireland) Dundalk (1st)
(Croatia) Dinamo Zagreb (1st)	(Hungary) Videoton (1st)	(Finland) HJK (1st)	(Luxembourg) Fola Esch (1st)
(Poland) Lech Poznań (1st)	(Slovenia) Maribor (1st)	(Iceland) Stjarnan (1st)	(Malta) Hibernians (1st)
(Belarus) BATE Borisov (1st)	(Slovakia) Trenčín (1st)	(Latvia) Ventspils (1st)	
(Scotland) Celtic (1st)	(Moldova) Milsami Orhei (1st)	(Montenegro) Rudar Pljevlja (1st)	
First qualifying round
(Northern Ireland) Crusaders (1st)	(Armenia) Pyunik (1st)	(Faroe Islands) B36 (1st)	(Andorra) FC Santa Coloma (1st)
(Wales) The New Saints (1st)	(Estonia) Levadia Tallinn (1st)	(San Marino) Folgore (1st)	(Gibraltar) Lincoln Red Imps (1st)

== Round and draw dates ==
The schedule of the competition was as follows (all draws were held at UEFA headquarters in Nyon, Switzerland, unless stated otherwise).

Phase	Round	Draw date	First leg	Second leg
Qualifying	First qualifying round	22 June 2015	30 June–1 July 2015	7–8 July 2015
Qualifying	Second qualifying round	22 June 2015	14–15 July 2015	21–22 July 2015
Qualifying	Third qualifying round	17 July 2015	28–29 July 2015	4–5 August 2015
Play-off	Play-off round	7 August 2015	18–19 August 2015	25–26 August 2015
Group stage	Matchday 1	27 August 2015 (Monaco)	15–16 September 2015	
Group stage	Matchday 2	27 August 2015 (Monaco)	29–30 September 2015	
Group stage	Matchday 3	27 August 2015 (Monaco)	20–21 October 2015	
Group stage	Matchday 4	27 August 2015 (Monaco)	3–4 November 2015	
Group stage	Matchday 5	27 August 2015 (Monaco)	24–25 November 2015	
Group stage	Matchday 6	27 August 2015 (Monaco)	8–9 December 2015	
Knockout phase	Round of 16	14 December 2015	16–17 & 23–24 February 2016	8–9 & 15–16 March 2016
Knockout phase	Quarter-finals	18 March 2016	5–6 April 2016	12–13 April 2016
Knockout phase	Semi-finals	15 April 2016	26–27 April 2016	3–4 May 2016
Knockout phase	Final	15 April 2016	28 May 2016 at Stadio San Siro, Milan	

== Qualifying rounds ==
In the qualifying rounds and the play-off round, teams were divided into seeded and unseeded teams based on their 2015 UEFA club coefficients, and then drawn into two-legged home-and-away ties. Teams from the same association could not be drawn against each other.

=== First qualifying round ===
The draw for the first and second qualifying rounds was held on 22 June 2015. The first legs were played on 30 June and 1 July, and the second legs were played on 7 July 2015.

Lincoln Red Imps became the first Gibraltar team to win a tie in a UEFA competition, two years after Gibraltar's teams were first admitted entry.

Team 1	Agg.	Team 2	1st leg	2nd leg
Lincoln Red Imps (Gibraltar)	2–1	(Andorra) FC Santa Coloma	0–0	2–1
Crusaders (Northern Ireland)	1–1 (a)	(Estonia) Levadia Tallinn	0–0	1–1
Pyunik (Armenia)	4–2	(San Marino) Folgore	2–1	2–1
B36 (Faroe Islands)	2–6	(Wales) The New Saints	1–2	1–4

=== Second qualifying round ===
The first legs were played on 14 and 15 July, and the second legs were played on 21 and 22 July 2015.

Team 1	Agg.	Team 2	1st leg	2nd leg
Hibernians (Malta)	3–6	(Israel) Maccabi Tel Aviv	2–1	1–5
APOEL (Cyprus)	1–1 (a)	(North Macedonia) Vardar	0–0	1–1
Qarabağ (Azerbaijan)	1–0	(Montenegro) Rudar Pljevlja	0–0	1–0
Sarajevo (Bosnia and Herzegovina)	0–3	(Poland) Lech Poznań	0–2	0–1
Maribor (Slovenia)	2–3	(Kazakhstan) Astana	1–0	1–3
BATE Borisov (Belarus)	2–1	(Republic of Ireland) Dundalk	2–1	0–0
Ventspils (Latvia)	1–4 (Note: Order of legs reversed after original draw.)	(Finland) HJK	1–3	0–1
Midtjylland (Denmark)	3–0	(Gibraltar) Lincoln Red Imps	1–0	2–0
Molde (Norway)	5–1	(Armenia) Pyunik	5–0	0–1
Malmö FF (Sweden)	1–0	(Lithuania) Žalgiris	0–0	1–0
Celtic (Scotland)	6–1	(Iceland) Stjarnan	2–0	4–1
Trenčín (Slovakia)	3–4	(Romania) Steaua București	0–2	3–2
Partizan (Serbia)	3–0	(Georgia (country)) Dila Gori	1–0	2–0
Ludogorets Razgrad (Bulgaria)	1–3	(Moldova) Milsami Orhei	0–1	1–2
Dinamo Zagreb (Croatia)	4–1	(Luxembourg) Fola Esch	1–1	3–0
Skënderbeu (Albania)	6–4	(Northern Ireland) Crusaders	4–1	2–3
The New Saints (Wales)	1–2	(Hungary) Videoton	0–1	1–1 (a.e.t.)

=== Third qualifying round ===
The third qualifying round was split into two separate sections: Champions Route (for league champions) and League Route (for league non-champions). The losing teams in both sections entered the 2015–16 UEFA Europa League play-off round.

The draw for the third qualifying round was held on 17 July 2015. The first legs were played on 28 and 29 July, and the second legs were played on 4 and 5 August 2015.

Team 1	Agg.	Team 2	1st leg	2nd leg
Champions Route
Lech Poznań (Poland)	1–4	(Switzerland) Basel	1–3	0–1
Milsami Orhei (Moldova)	0–4	(Albania) Skënderbeu	0–2	0–2
HJK (Finland)	3–4	(Kazakhstan) Astana	0–0	3–4
Celtic (Scotland)	1–0	(Azerbaijan) Qarabağ	1–0	0–0
Steaua București (Romania)	3–5	(Serbia) Partizan	1–1	2–4
Midtjylland (Denmark)	2–2 (a)	(Cyprus) APOEL	1–2	1–0
Maccabi Tel Aviv (Israel)	3–2	(Czech Republic) Viktoria Plzeň	1–2	2–0
Dinamo Zagreb (Croatia)	4–4 (a)	(Norway) Molde	1–1	3–3
Videoton (Hungary)	1–2	(Belarus) BATE Borisov	1–1	0–1
Red Bull Salzburg (Austria)	2–3	(Sweden) Malmö FF	2–0	0–3
League Route
Panathinaikos (Greece)	2–4	(Belgium) Club Brugge	2–1	0–3
Young Boys (Switzerland)	1–7	(France) Monaco	1–3	0–4
CSKA Moscow (Russia)	5–4	(Czech Republic) Sparta Prague	2–2	3–2
Rapid Wien (Austria)	5–4	(Netherlands) Ajax	2–2	3–2
Fenerbahçe (Turkey)	0–3	(Ukraine) Shakhtar Donetsk	0–0	0–3

== Play-off round ==
The play-off round was split into two separate sections: Champions Route (for league champions) and League Route (for league non-champions). The losing teams in both sections entered the 2015–16 UEFA Europa League group stage.

The draw for the play-off round was held on 7 August 2015. The first legs were played on 18 and 19 August, and the second legs were played on 25 and 26 August 2015.

Team 1	Agg.	Team 2	1st leg	2nd leg
Champions Route
Astana (Kazakhstan)	2–1	(Cyprus) APOEL	1–0	1–1
Skënderbeu (Albania)	2–6	(Croatia) Dinamo Zagreb	1–2	1–4
Celtic (Scotland)	3–4	(Sweden) Malmö FF	3–2	0–2
Basel (Switzerland)	3–3 (a)	(Israel) Maccabi Tel Aviv	2–2	1–1
BATE Borisov (Belarus)	2–2 (a)	(Serbia) Partizan	1–0	1–2
League Route
Lazio (Italy)	1–3	(Germany) Bayer Leverkusen	1–0	0–3
Manchester United (England)	7–1	(Belgium) Club Brugge	3–1	4–0
Sporting CP (Portugal)	3–4	(Russia) CSKA Moscow	2–1	1–3
Rapid Wien (Austria)	2–3	(Ukraine) Shakhtar Donetsk	0–1	2–2
Valencia (Spain)	4–3	(France) Monaco	3–1	1–2

== Group stage ==
Location of teams of the 2015–16 UEFA Champions League group stage.
Brown: Group A; Red: Group B; Orange: Group C; Yellow: Group D;
Green: Group E; Blue: Group F; Purple: Group G; Pink: Group H.

The draw for the group stage was held in Monaco on 27 August 2015. The 32 teams were drawn into eight groups of four, with the restriction that teams from the same association could not be drawn against each other. For the draw, the teams were seeded into four pots based on the following principles (introduced starting this season):

- Pot 1 contained the title holders and the champions of the top seven associations based on their 2014 UEFA country coefficients. As the title holders (Barcelona) were one of the champions of the top seven associations, the champions of the association ranked eighth (Netherlands' PSV Eindhoven) were also seeded into Pot 1 (regulations Article 13.05).
- Pot 2, 3 and 4 contained the remaining teams, seeded based on their 2015 UEFA club coefficients.

In each group, teams played against each other home-and-away in a round-robin format. The group winners and runners-up advanced to the round of 16, while the third-placed teams entered the 2015–16 UEFA Europa League round of 32. The matchdays were 15–16 September, 29–30 September, 20–21 October, 3–4 November, 24–25 November, and 8–9 December 2015.

The youth teams of the clubs that qualified for the group stage also played in the 2015–16 UEFA Youth League on the same matchdays, where they competed in the UEFA Champions League Path (with the UEFA Youth League expanded to 64 teams, the youth domestic champions of the top 32 associations compete in a separate Domestic Champions Path until the play-offs).

A total of 17 national associations were represented in the group stage. Astana, Borussia Mönchengladbach and Gent made their debut appearances in the group stage. Astana were the first team from Kazakhstan to play in the Champions League group stage. With the maximum teams from the same association in the group stage increased from four to five, Spain became the first association to have five teams in the Champions League group stage. Since all three qualifying teams from the highest ranked leagues won their ties in the league route playoff round, the three countries of Spain, England and Germany had 13 of the 32 clubs in the group stage.

Tiebreakers
The teams were ranked according to points (3 points for a win, 1 point for a draw, 0 points for a loss). If two or more teams were equal on points on completion of the group matches, the following criteria were applied in the order given to determine the rankings (regulations Article 17.01):
1. higher number of points obtained in the group matches played among the teams in question;
2. superior goal difference from the group matches played among the teams in question;
3. higher number of goals scored in the group matches played among the teams in question;
4. higher number of goals scored away from home in the group matches played among the teams in question;
5. if, after having applied criteria 1 to 4, teams still had an equal ranking, criteria 1 to 4 were reapplied exclusively to the matches between the teams in question to determine their final rankings. If this procedure did not lead to a decision, criteria 6 to 12 applied;
6. superior goal difference in all group matches;
7. higher number of goals scored in all group matches;
8. higher number of away goals scored in all group matches;
9. higher number of wins in all group matches;
10. higher number of away wins in all group matches;
11. lower disciplinary points total based only on yellow and red cards received in all group matches (red card = 3 points, yellow card = 1 point, expulsion for two yellow cards in one match = 3 points);
12. higher club coefficient.

=== Group A ===
Pos	Team	Pld	W	D	L	GF	GA	GD	Pts	Qualification	RMA	PAR	SHK	MAL
1	(Spain) Real Madrid	6	5	1	0	19	3	+16	16	Advance to knockout phase	—	1–0	4–0	8–0
2	(France) Paris Saint-Germain	6	4	1	1	12	1	+11	13	Advance to knockout phase	0–0	—	2–0	2–0
3	(Ukraine) Shakhtar Donetsk	6	1	0	5	7	14	−7	3	Transfer to Europa League	3–4	0–3	—	4–0
4	(Sweden) Malmö FF	6	1	0	5	1	21	−20	3		0–2	0–5	1–0	—

Source: UEFA

=== Group B ===
Pos	Team	Pld	W	D	L	GF	GA	GD	Pts	Qualification	WOL	PSV	MUN	CSKA
1	(Germany) VfL Wolfsburg	6	4	0	2	9	6	+3	12	Advance to knockout phase	—	2–0	3–2	1–0
2	(Netherlands) PSV Eindhoven	6	3	1	2	8	7	+1	10	Advance to knockout phase	2–0	—	2–1	2–1
3	(England) Manchester United	6	2	2	2	7	7	0	8	Transfer to Europa League	2–1	0–0	—	1–0
4	(Russia) CSKA Moscow	6	1	1	4	5	9	−4	4		0–2	3–2	1–1	—

Source: UEFA

=== Group C ===
Pos	Team	Pld	W	D	L	GF	GA	GD	Pts	Qualification	ATM	BEN	GAL	AST
1	(Spain) Atlético Madrid	6	4	1	1	11	3	+8	13	Advance to knockout phase	—	1–2	2–0	4–0
2	(Portugal) Benfica	6	3	1	2	10	8	+2	10	Advance to knockout phase	1–2	—	2–1	2–0
3	(Turkey) Galatasaray	6	1	2	3	6	10	−4	5	Transfer to Europa League	0–2	2–1	—	1–1
4	(Kazakhstan) Astana	6	0	4	2	5	11	−6	4		0–0	2–2	2–2	—

Source: UEFA

=== Group D ===
Pos	Team	Pld	W	D	L	GF	GA	GD	Pts	Qualification	MCI	JUV	SEV	BMG
1	(England) Manchester City	6	4	0	2	12	8	+4	12	Advance to knockout phase	—	1–2	2–1	4–2
2	(Italy) Juventus	6	3	2	1	6	3	+3	11	Advance to knockout phase	1–0	—	2–0	0–0
3	(Spain) Sevilla	6	2	0	4	8	11	−3	6	Transfer to Europa League	1–3	1–0	—	3–0
4	(Germany) Borussia Mönchengladbach	6	1	2	3	8	12	−4	5		1–2	1–1	4–2	—

Source: UEFA

=== Group E ===
Pos	Team	Pld	W	D	L	GF	GA	GD	Pts	Qualification	BAR	ROM	LEV	BATE
1	(Spain) Barcelona	6	4	2	0	15	4	+11	14	Advance to knockout phase	—	6–1	2–1	3–0
2	(Italy) Roma	6	1	3	2	11	16	−5	6	Advance to knockout phase	1–1	—	3–2	0–0
3	(Germany) Bayer Leverkusen	6	1	3	2	13	12	+1	6	Transfer to Europa League	1–1	4–4	—	4–1
4	(Belarus) BATE Borisov	6	1	2	3	5	12	−7	5		0–2	3–2	1–1	—

Source: UEFA

=== Group F ===
Pos	Team	Pld	W	D	L	GF	GA	GD	Pts	Qualification	BAY	ARS	OLY	DZG
1	(Germany) Bayern Munich	6	5	0	1	19	3	+16	15	Advance to knockout phase	—	5–1	4–0	5–0
2	(England) Arsenal	6	3	0	3	12	10	+2	9	Advance to knockout phase	2–0	—	2–3	3–0
3	(Greece) Olympiacos	6	3	0	3	6	13	−7	9	Transfer to Europa League	0–3	0–3	—	2–1
4	(Croatia) Dinamo Zagreb	6	1	0	5	3	14	−11	3		0–2	2–1	0–1	—

Source: UEFA

=== Group G ===
Pos	Team	Pld	W	D	L	GF	GA	GD	Pts	Qualification	CHE	DKV	POR	MTA
1	(England) Chelsea	6	4	1	1	13	3	+10	13	Advance to knockout phase	—	2–1	2–0	4–0
2	(Ukraine) Dynamo Kyiv	6	3	2	1	8	4	+4	11	Advance to knockout phase	0–0	—	2–2	1–0
3	(Portugal) Porto	6	3	1	2	9	8	+1	10	Transfer to Europa League	2–1	0–2	—	2–0
4	(Israel) Maccabi Tel Aviv	6	0	0	6	1	16	−15	0		0–4	0–2	1–3	—

Source: UEFA

=== Group H ===
Pos	Team	Pld	W	D	L	GF	GA	GD	Pts	Qualification	ZEN	GNT	VAL	LYO
1	(Russia) Zenit Saint Petersburg	6	5	0	1	13	6	+7	15	Advance to knockout phase	—	2–1	2–0	3–1
2	(Belgium) Gent	6	3	1	2	8	7	+1	10	Advance to knockout phase	2–1	—	1–0	1–1
3	(Spain) Valencia	6	2	0	4	5	9	−4	6	Transfer to Europa League	2–3	2–1	—	0–2
4	(France) Lyon	6	1	1	4	5	9	−4	4		0–2	1–2	0–1	—

Source: UEFA

== Knockout phase ==
In the knockout phase, teams played against each other over two legs on a home-and-away basis, except for the one-match final. The mechanism of the draws for each round was as follows:

- In the draw for the round of 16, the eight group winners were seeded, and the eight group runners-up were unseeded. The seeded teams were drawn against the unseeded teams, with the seeded teams hosting the second leg. Teams from the same group or the same association could not be drawn against each other.
- In the draws for the quarter-finals onwards, there were no seedings, and teams from the same group or the same association could be drawn against each other.

=== Bracket ===
Round of 16
(France) Paris Saint-Germain	2	2	4
(England) Chelsea	1	1	2
(Ukraine) Dynamo Kyiv	1	0	1
(England) Manchester City	3	0	3
(Belgium) Gent	2	0	2
(Germany) VfL Wolfsburg	3	1	4
(Italy) Roma	0	0	0
(Spain) Real Madrid	2	2	4
(England) Arsenal	0	1	1
(Spain) Barcelona	2	3	5
(Netherlands) PSV Eindhoven	0	0	0 (7)
(Spain) Atlético Madrid (p)	0	0	0 (8)
(Italy) Juventus	2	2	4
(Germany) Bayern Munich (a.e.t.)	2	4	6
(Portugal) Benfica	1	2	3
(Russia) Zenit Saint Petersburg	0	1	1

Quarter-finals
(France) Paris Saint-Germain	2	0	2
(England) Manchester City	2	1	3
(Germany) VfL Wolfsburg	2	0	2
(Spain) Real Madrid	0	3	3
(Spain) Barcelona	2	0	2
(Spain) Atlético Madrid	1	2	3
(Germany) Bayern Munich	1	2	3
(Portugal) Benfica	0	2	2

Semi-finals
(England) Manchester City	0	0	0
(Spain) Real Madrid	0	1	1
(Spain) Atlético Madrid (a)	1	1	2
(Germany) Bayern Munich	0	2	2

Final
28 May – Milan
(Spain) Real Madrid (p)	1 (5)
(Spain) Atlético Madrid	1 (3)

=== Round of 16 ===
The draw for the round of 16 was held on 14 December 2015. The first legs were played on 16, 17, 23 and 24 February, and the second legs were played on 8, 9, 15 and 16 March 2016.

Team 1	Agg.	Team 2	1st leg	2nd leg
Gent (Belgium)	2–4	(Germany) VfL Wolfsburg	2–3	0–1
Roma (Italy)	0–4	(Spain) Real Madrid	0–2	0–2
Paris Saint-Germain (France)	4–2	(England) Chelsea	2–1	2–1
Arsenal (England)	1–5	(Spain) Barcelona	0–2	1–3
Juventus (Italy)	4–6	(Germany) Bayern Munich	2–2	2–4 (a.e.t.)
PSV Eindhoven (Netherlands)	0–0 (7–8 p)	(Spain) Atlético Madrid	0–0	0–0 (a.e.t.)
Benfica (Portugal)	3–1	(Russia) Zenit Saint Petersburg	1–0	2–1
Dynamo Kyiv (Ukraine)	1–3	(England) Manchester City	1–3	0–0

=== Quarter-finals ===
The draw for the quarter-finals was held on 18 March 2016. The first legs were played on 5 and 6 April, and the second legs were played on 12 and 13 April 2016.

Team 1	Agg.	Team 2	1st leg	2nd leg
VfL Wolfsburg (Germany)	2–3	(Spain) Real Madrid	2–0	0–3
Bayern Munich (Germany)	3–2	(Portugal) Benfica	1–0	2–2
Barcelona (Spain)	2–3	(Spain) Atlético Madrid	2–1	0–2
Paris Saint-Germain (France)	2–3	(England) Manchester City	2–2	0–1

=== Semi-finals ===
The draw for the semi-finals was held on 15 April 2016. The first legs were played on 26 and 27 April, and the second legs were played on 3 and 4 May 2016.

Team 1	Agg.	Team 2	1st leg	2nd leg
Manchester City (England)	0–1	(Spain) Real Madrid	0–0	0–1
Atlético Madrid (Spain)	2–2 (a)	(Germany) Bayern Munich	1–0	1–2

=== Final ===
The final was played on 28 May 2016 at Stadio San Siro in Milan, Italy. The "home" team (for administrative purposes) was determined by an additional draw held after the semi-final draw.

28 May 2016
20:45 UTC+2

Real Madrid (Spain)	1–1 (a.e.t.)	(Spain) Atlético Madrid
Ramos 15'	Report	Carrasco 79'
Penalties
Vázquez (penalty scored); Marcelo (penalty scored); Bale (penalty scored); Ramos (penalty scored); Ronaldo (penalty scored)	5–3	(penalty scored) Griezmann; (penalty scored) Gabi; (penalty scored) Saúl; (penalty missed) Juanfran

Stadio San Siro, Milan
Attendance: 71,942
Referee: Mark Clattenburg (England)

== Statistics ==
Statistics exclude qualifying rounds and play-off round.

=== Top goalscorers ===
Rank	Player	Team	Goals	Minutes played
1	(Portugal) Cristiano Ronaldo	(Spain) Real Madrid	16	1109
2	(Poland) Robert Lewandowski	(Germany) Bayern Munich	9	942
3	(Uruguay) Luis Suárez	(Spain) Barcelona	8	810
3	(Germany) Thomas Müller	(Germany) Bayern Munich	8	926
5	(France) Antoine Griezmann	(Spain) Atlético Madrid	7	1135
6	(Argentina) Lionel Messi	(Spain) Barcelona	6	630
6	(Russia) Artem Dzyuba	(Russia) Zenit Saint Petersburg	6	633
8	(France) Olivier Giroud	(England) Arsenal	5	384
8	(Mexico) Javier Hernández	(Germany) Bayer Leverkusen	5	487
8	(Brazil) Willian	(England) Chelsea	5	642
8	(Sweden) Zlatan Ibrahimović	(France) Paris Saint-Germain	5	880

=== Squad of the Season ===
The UEFA Technical Study Group selected the following 18 players as the squad of the tournament.

Pos.	Name	Team
GK	(Slovenia) Jan Oblak	(Spain) Atlético Madrid
GK	(Germany) Manuel Neuer	(Germany) Bayern Munich
DF	(Uruguay) Diego Godín	(Spain) Atlético Madrid
DF	(Spain) Juanfran	(Spain) Atlético Madrid
DF	(Brazil) Thiago Silva	(France) Paris Saint-Germain
DF	(Spain) Sergio Ramos	(Spain) Real Madrid
DF	(Brazil) Marcelo	(Spain) Real Madrid
MF	(Spain) Gabi	(Spain) Atlético Madrid
MF	(Spain) Koke	(Spain) Atlético Madrid
MF	(Spain) Andrés Iniesta	(Spain) Barcelona
MF	(Germany) Toni Kroos	(Spain) Real Madrid
MF	(Croatia) Luka Modrić	(Spain) Real Madrid
FW	(France) Antoine Griezmann	(Spain) Atlético Madrid
FW	(Uruguay) Luis Suárez	(Spain) Barcelona
FW	(Argentina) Lionel Messi	(Spain) Barcelona
FW	(Poland) Robert Lewandowski	(Germany) Bayern Munich
FW	(Portugal) Cristiano Ronaldo	(Spain) Real Madrid
FW	(Wales) Gareth Bale	(Spain) Real Madrid

== See also ==
- 2015–16 UEFA Europa League
- 2015–16 UEFA Youth League
- 2016 UEFA Super Cup
- 2016 FIFA Club World Cup
- 2015–16 UEFA Women's Champions League
