= 2015–16 UEFA Champions League qualifying =

European football tournament

2015–16 UEFA Champions League qualifying was the preliminary phase of the 2015–16 UEFA Champions League, prior to the competition proper. Qualification consisted of the qualifying phase (first to third rounds) and the play-off round. It began on 30 June and ended on 26 August 2015. A total of 56 teams competed to decide 10 of the 32 places in the group stage.

All times were CEST (UTC+2).

== Round and draw dates ==
All draws were held at UEFA headquarters in Nyon, Switzerland.

Round	Draw date and time	First leg	Second leg
First qualifying round	22 June 2015, 12:00	30 June – 1 July 2015	7–8 July 2015
Second qualifying round	22 June 2015, 12:00	14–15 July 2015	21–22 July 2015
Third qualifying round	17 July 2015, 12:00	28–29 July 2015	4–5 August 2015
Play-off round	7 August 2015, 12:00	18–19 August 2015	25–26 August 2015

== Format ==
In the qualifying phase and play-off round, each tie was played over two legs, with each team playing one leg at home. The team that scored more goals on aggregate over the two legs advanced to the next round. If the aggregate score was level, the away goals rule was applied, i.e., the team that scored more goals away from home over the two legs advanced. If away goals were also equal, then 30 minutes of extra time were played, divided into two 15-minute halves. The away goals rule was again applied after extra time, i.e., if there were goals scored during extra time and the aggregate score was still level, the visiting team advanced by virtue of more away goals scored. If no goals were scored during extra time, the tie was decided by a penalty shoot-out.

In the draws for each round, teams were seeded based on their UEFA club coefficients at the beginning of the season, with the teams divided into seeded and unseeded pots. A seeded team was drawn against an unseeded team, with the order of legs in each tie decided by draw. Due to the limited time between matches, the draws for the second and third qualifying rounds took place before the results of the previous round were known. For these draws (or in any cases where the result of a tie in the previous round was not known at the time of the draw), the seeding was carried out under the assumption that the team with the higher coefficient of an undecided tie advanced to this round, which means if the team with the lower coefficient was to advance, it simply took the seeding of its defeated opponent. Prior to the draws, UEFA formed "groups" in accordance with the principles set by the Club Competitions Committee, but they were purely for convenience of the draw and for ensuring that teams from the same association were not drawn against each other, and did not resemble any real groupings in the sense of the competition.

== Teams ==
There were two routes which the teams were separated into during qualifying:

- Champions Route, which included all domestic champions which had not qualified for the group stage.
- League Route (also called the Non-champions Path or the Best-placed Path), which included all domestic non-champions which had not qualified for the group stage.

A total of 56 teams (41 in Champions Route, 15 in League Route) were involved in the qualifying phase and play-off round. The 10 winners of the play-off round (5 in Champions Route, 5 in League Route) advanced to the group stage to join the 22 teams which entered in the group stage. The 15 losers of the third qualifying round entered the Europa League play-off round, and the 10 losers of the play-off round entered the Europa League group stage.

Below are the participating teams (with their 2015 UEFA club coefficients), grouped by their starting rounds.

Key to colours
Winners of the play-off round advanced to the group stage
Losers of the play-off round entered the Europa League group stage
Losers of the third qualifying round entered the Europa League play-off round

=== Champions Route ===
Third qualifying round
Team	Coeff
(Switzerland) Basel	84.875
(Austria) Red Bull Salzburg	43.135
(Czech Republic) Viktoria Plzeň	41.825

Second qualifying round
Team	Coeff
(Romania) Steaua București	40.259
(Scotland) Celtic	39.080
(Cyprus) APOEL	35.460
(Belarus) BATE Borisov	35.150
(Bulgaria) Ludogorets Razgrad	25.350
(Croatia) Dinamo Zagreb	24.700
(Slovenia) Maribor	22.225
(Israel) Maccabi Tel Aviv	18.200
(Poland) Lech Poznań	17.300
(Serbia) Partizan	14.775
(Sweden) Malmö FF	12.545
(Azerbaijan) Qarabağ	11.500
(Finland) HJK	11.140
(Norway) Molde	10.375
(Denmark) Midtjylland	7.960
(Hungary) Videoton	7.950
(Albania) Skënderbeu	5.575
(Bosnia and Herzegovina) Sarajevo	5.500
(Latvia) Ventspils	5.350
(Georgia (country)) Dila Gori	4.875
(Slovakia) Trenčín	4.250
(Lithuania) Žalgiris	3.900
(Kazakhstan) Astana	3.825
(Moldova) Milsami Orhei	3.750
(Montenegro) Rudar Pljevlja	3.375
(North Macedonia) Vardar	3.175
(Iceland) Stjarnan	3.100
(Luxembourg) Fola Esch	2.525
(Republic of Ireland) Dundalk	2.150
(Malta) Hibernians	1.591

First qualifying round
Team	Coeff
(Wales) The New Saints	5.575
(Estonia) Levadia Tallinn	4.200
(Armenia) Pyunik	3.550
(Andorra) FC Santa Coloma	2.666
(Northern Ireland) Crusaders	2.475
(Faroe Islands) B36	1.450
(Gibraltar) Lincoln Red Imps	0.550
(San Marino) Folgore	0.349

=== League Route ===
Play-off round
Team	Coeff
(England) Manchester United	103.078
(Spain) Valencia	99.999
(Germany) Bayer Leverkusen	87.883
(Portugal) Sporting CP	56.276
(Italy) Lazio	49.102

Third qualifying round
Team	Coeff
(Ukraine) Shakhtar Donetsk	86.033
(Netherlands) Ajax	66.195
(Russia) CSKA Moscow	55.599
(Belgium) Club Brugge	41.440
(France) Monaco	31.483
(Switzerland) Young Boys	31.375
(Czech Republic) Sparta Prague	30.825
(Turkey) Fenerbahçe	30.020
(Greece) Panathinaikos	19.880
(Austria) Rapid Wien	15.635

== First qualifying round ==
=== Seeding ===
A total of eight teams played in the first qualifying round. The draw was held on 22 June 2015.

Seeded	Unseeded
(Wales) The New Saints (Estonia) Levadia Tallinn (Armenia) Pyunik (Andorra) FC Santa Coloma	(Northern Ireland) Crusaders (Faroe Islands) B36 (Gibraltar) Lincoln Red Imps (San Marino) Folgore

=== Summary ===
The first legs were played on 30 June and 1 July, and the second legs were played on 7 July 2015.

Team 1	Agg.	Team 2	1st leg	2nd leg
Lincoln Red Imps (Gibraltar)	2–1	(Andorra) FC Santa Coloma	0–0	2–1
Crusaders (Northern Ireland)	1–1 (a)	(Estonia) Levadia Tallinn	0–0	1–1
Pyunik (Armenia)	4–2	(San Marino) Folgore	2–1	2–1
B36 (Faroe Islands)	2–6	(Wales) The New Saints	1–2	1–4

=== Matches ===
30 June 2015
20:00

Lincoln Red Imps (Gibraltar)	0–0	(Andorra) FC Santa Coloma
	Report

Victoria Stadium, Gibraltar
Attendance: 1,520
Referee: Johnny Casanova (San Marino)
7 July 2015
20:00

FC Santa Coloma (Andorra)	1–2	(Gibraltar) Lincoln Red Imps
Lima 44'	Report	Bardon 48'; L. Casciaro 64'

Estadi Comunal, Andorra la Vella
Attendance: 700
Referee: Roomer Tarajev (Estonia)

Lincoln Red Imps won 2–1 on aggregate.

30 June 2015
20:45

Crusaders (Northern Ireland)	0–0	(Estonia) Levadia Tallinn
	Report

Seaview, Belfast
Attendance: 1,748
Referee: Þorvaldur Árnason (Iceland)
7 July 2015
18:00

Levadia Tallinn (Estonia)	1–1	(Northern Ireland) Crusaders
Luts 22'	Report	Carvill 4'

A. Le Coq Arena, Tallinn (Note: Levadia Tallinn played their home match at A. Le Coq Arena, Tallinn, instead of their regular stadium Kadriorg Stadium, Tallinn.)
Attendance: 1,230
Referee: Giorgi Kruashvili (Georgia)

1–1 on aggregate; Crusaders won on away goals.

30 June 2015
18:00

Pyunik (Armenia)	2–1	(San Marino) Folgore
Satumyan 45+2'; Romero 48'	Report	Hirsch 71'

Vazgen Sargsyan Republican Stadium, Yerevan (Note: Pyunik played their home matches at Vazgen Sargsyan Republican Stadium, Yerevan, instead of their regular stadium Football Academy Stadium, Yerevan.)
Attendance: 4,000
Referee: Dimitrios Massias (Cyprus)
7 July 2015
20:30

Folgore (San Marino)	1–2	(Armenia) Pyunik
Traini 65'	Report	K. Hovhannisyan 6'; Satumyan 41'

San Marino Stadium, Serravalle
Attendance: 821
Referee: Ignasi Villamayor Rozados (Andorra)

Pyunik won 4–2 on aggregate.

1 July 2015
20:00

B36 (Faroe Islands)	1–2	(Wales) The New Saints
Samuelsen 7'	Report	Quigley 9'; Wilde 90'

Tórsvøllur, Tórshavn (Note: B36 Tórshavn played their home match at Tórsvøllur, Tórshavn, instead of their regular stadium Gundadalur, Tórshavn.)
Attendance: 1,050
Referee: Sven Bindels (Luxembourg)
7 July 2015
20:00

The New Saints (Wales)	4–1	(Faroe Islands) B36
Wilde 15', 27', 47'; Williams 89'	Report	Cieślewicz 90+1'

Park Hall, Oswestry
Attendance: 1,148
Referee: Ville Nevalainen (Finland)

The New Saints won 6–2 on aggregate.

== Second qualifying round ==
=== Seeding ===
A total of 34 teams played in the second qualifying round: 30 teams which entered in this round, and the four winners of the first qualifying round. The draw was held on 22 June 2015.

Group 1		Group 2		Group 3	
Seeded	Unseeded	Seeded	Unseeded	Seeded	Unseeded
(Cyprus) APOEL (Slovenia) Maribor (Israel) Maccabi Tel Aviv (Poland) Lech Poznań (Azerbaijan) Qarabağ	(Bosnia and Herzegovina) Sarajevo (Kazakhstan) Astana (Montenegro) Rudar Pljevlja (North Macedonia) Vardar (Malta) Hibernians	(Scotland) Celtic (Belarus) BATE Borisov (Sweden) Malmö FF (Finland) HJK (Norway) Molde (Denmark) Midtjylland	(Latvia) Ventspils (Lithuania) Žalgiris (Armenia) Pyunik (Iceland) Stjarnan (Gibraltar) Lincoln Red Imps (Republic of Ireland) Dundalk	(Romania) Steaua București (Bulgaria) Ludogorets Razgrad (Croatia) Dinamo Zagreb (Serbia) Partizan (Hungary) Videoton (Albania) Skënderbeu	(Wales) The New Saints (Georgia (country)) Dila Gori (Slovakia) Trenčín (Northern Ireland) Crusaders (Moldova) Milsami Orhei (Luxembourg) Fola Esch

Notes

1. ^{†} Winners of the first qualifying round whose identity was not known at the time of the draw. Teams in italics defeated a team with a higher coefficient in the first qualifying round, thus effectively taking the coefficient of their defeated opponent in the draw for the second qualifying round.

=== Summary ===
The first legs were played on 14 and 15 July, and the second legs were played on 21 and 22 July 2015.

Team 1	Agg.	Team 2	1st leg	2nd leg
Hibernians (Malta)	3–6	(Israel) Maccabi Tel Aviv	2–1	1–5
APOEL (Cyprus)	1–1 (a)	(North Macedonia) Vardar	0–0	1–1
Qarabağ (Azerbaijan)	1–0	(Montenegro) Rudar Pljevlja	0–0	1–0
Sarajevo (Bosnia and Herzegovina)	0–3	(Poland) Lech Poznań	0–2	0–1
Maribor (Slovenia)	2–3	(Kazakhstan) Astana	1–0	1–3
BATE Borisov (Belarus)	2–1	(Republic of Ireland) Dundalk	2–1	0–0
Ventspils (Latvia)	1–4 (Note: Order of legs reversed after original draw.)	(Finland) HJK	1–3	0–1
Midtjylland (Denmark)	3–0	(Gibraltar) Lincoln Red Imps	1–0	2–0
Molde (Norway)	5–1	(Armenia) Pyunik	5–0	0–1
Malmö FF (Sweden)	1–0	(Lithuania) Žalgiris	0–0	1–0
Celtic (Scotland)	6–1	(Iceland) Stjarnan	2–0	4–1
Trenčín (Slovakia)	3–4	(Romania) Steaua București	0–2	3–2
Partizan (Serbia)	3–0	(Georgia (country)) Dila Gori	1–0	2–0
Ludogorets Razgrad (Bulgaria)	1–3	(Moldova) Milsami Orhei	0–1	1–2
Dinamo Zagreb (Croatia)	4–1	(Luxembourg) Fola Esch	1–1	3–0
Skënderbeu (Albania)	6–4	(Northern Ireland) Crusaders	4–1	2–3
The New Saints (Wales)	1–2	(Hungary) Videoton	0–1	1–1 (a.e.t.)

=== Matches ===
14 July 2015
20:00

Hibernians (Malta)	2–1	(Israel) Maccabi Tel Aviv
Jorginho 74'; Lima 85'	Report	Igiebor 22'

Hibernians Ground, Paola
Attendance: 1,470
Referee: Sergey Lapochkin (Russia)
21 July 2015
19:30

Maccabi Tel Aviv (Israel)	5–1	(Malta) Hibernians
Jorginho 32' (o.g.); Zahavi 58' (pen.), 90'; Ben Haim II 61'; Igiebor 82'	Report	Soares 52'

Bloomfield Stadium, Tel Aviv
Attendance: 13,125
Referee: Andris Treimanis (Latvia)

Maccabi Tel Aviv won 6–3 on aggregate.

14 July 2015
19:00

APOEL (Cyprus)	0–0	(North Macedonia) Vardar
	Report

GSP Stadium, Nicosia
Attendance: 14,531
Referee: Aliyar Aghayev (Azerbaijan)
21 July 2015
20:00

Vardar (North Macedonia)	1–1	(Cyprus) APOEL
Ljamčevski 90+4'	Report	De Vincenti 60'

Philip II Arena, Skopje
Attendance: 22,540
Referee: Davide Massa (Italy)

1–1 on aggregate; APOEL won on away goals.

15 July 2015
18:30

Qarabağ (Azerbaijan)	0–0	(Montenegro) Rudar Pljevlja
	Report

Tofiq Bahramov Republican Stadium, Baku
Attendance: 28,854
Referee: Sebastian Colțescu (Romania)
22 July 2015
20:45

Rudar Pljevlja (Montenegro)	0–1	(Azerbaijan) Qarabağ
	Report	Reynaldo 57'

Stadion pod Malim brdom, Petrovac (Note: Rudar Pljevlja played their home match at Stadion pod Malim brdom, Petrovac, instead of their regular stadium Gradski stadion, Pljevlja.)
Attendance: 1,400
Referee: Georgi Kabakov (Bulgaria)

Qarabağ won 1–0 on aggregate.

14 July 2015
21:00

Sarajevo (Bosnia and Herzegovina)	0–2	(Poland) Lech Poznań
	Report	Hämäläinen 40'; Thomalla 62'

Asim Ferhatović Hase Stadium, Sarajevo
Attendance: 16,500
Referee: Paolo Valeri (Italy)
22 July 2015
20:45

Lech Poznań (Poland)	1–0	(Bosnia and Herzegovina) Sarajevo
Douglas 6'	Report

INEA Stadion, Poznań
Attendance: 22,205
Referee: Kevin Clancy (Scotland)

Lech Poznań won 3–0 on aggregate.

14 July 2015
20:30

Maribor (Slovenia)	1–0	(Kazakhstan) Astana
Šuler 5'	Report

Ljudski vrt, Maribor
Attendance: 10,458
Referee: Carlos del Cerro Grande (Spain)
22 July 2015
16:00

Astana (Kazakhstan)	3–1	(Slovenia) Maribor
Dzholchiyev 12'; Cañas 43'; Twumasi 58'	Report	Rajčević 39'

Astana Arena, Astana
Attendance: 23,650
Referee: Adrien Jaccottet (Switzerland)

Astana won 3–2 on aggregate.

15 July 2015
19:30

BATE Borisov (Belarus)	2–1	(Republic of Ireland) Dundalk
Karnitsky 11'; Yablonskiy 38'	Report	McMillan 32'

Borisov Arena, Barysaw
Attendance: 11,421
Referee: Vlado Glođović (Serbia)
22 July 2015
20:45

Dundalk (Republic of Ireland)	0–0	(Belarus) BATE Borisov
	Report

Oriel Park, Dundalk
Attendance: 3,103
Referee: Stavros Tritsonis (Greece)

BATE Borisov won 2–1 on aggregate.

14 July 2015
17:30

Ventspils (Latvia)	1–3	(Finland) HJK
Jemeļins 63'	Report	Zeneli 75' (pen.); Jallow 86'; Tanaka 90+2'

Ventspils Olimpiskais Stadions, Ventspils
Attendance: 2,450
Referee: Jakob Kehlet (Denmark)
21 July 2015
18:00

HJK (Finland)	1–0	(Latvia) Ventspils
Havenaar 83'	Report

Sonera Stadium, Helsinki
Attendance: 6,562
Referee: Andreas Ekberg (Sweden)

HJK won 4–1 on aggregate.

14 July 2015
19:30

Midtjylland (Denmark)	1–0	(Gibraltar) Lincoln Red Imps
Rasmussen 33'	Report

MCH Arena, Herning
Attendance: 5,291
Referee: Alan Mario Sant (Malta)
21 July 2015
20:00

Lincoln Red Imps (Gibraltar)	0–2	(Denmark) Midtjylland
	Report	Pušić 44'; Duelund 89'

Victoria Stadium, Gibraltar
Attendance: 1,950
Referee: Hugo Miguel (Portugal)

Midtjylland won 3–0 on aggregate.

14 July 2015
20:00

Molde (Norway)	5–0	(Armenia) Pyunik
Elyounoussi 35', 44'; Kamara 84', 90+2'; Moström 90+5'	Report

Aker Stadion, Molde
Attendance: 5,650
Referee: Pavle Radovanović (Montenegro)
21 July 2015
16:00

Pyunik (Armenia)	1–0	(Norway) Molde
Badoyan 74'	Report

Vazgen Sargsyan Republican Stadium, Yerevan
Attendance: 2,500
Referee: Anatoliy Abdula (Ukraine)

Molde won 5–1 on aggregate.

15 July 2015
19:00

Malmö FF (Sweden)	0–0	(Lithuania) Žalgiris
	Report

Swedbank Stadion, Malmö
Attendance: 12,436
Referee: Eitan Shemeulevitch (Israel)
21 July 2015
20:10

Žalgiris (Lithuania)	0–1	(Sweden) Malmö FF
	Report	Tinnerholm 55'

LFF Stadium, Vilnius
Attendance: 4,933
Referee: Benoît Bastien (France)

Malmö FF won 1–0 on aggregate.

15 July 2015
20:45

Celtic (Scotland)	2–0	(Iceland) Stjarnan
Boyata 44'; Johansen 56'	Report

Celtic Park, Glasgow
Attendance: 37,969
Referee: Daniel Siebert (Germany)
22 July 2015
21:15

Stjarnan (Iceland)	1–4	(Scotland) Celtic
Finsen 7'	Report	Bitton 33'; Mulgrew 49'; Griffiths 88'; Johansen 90+3'

Stjörnuvöllur, Garðabær
Attendance: 1,022
Referee: Jonathan Lardot (Belgium)

Celtic won 6–1 on aggregate.

14 July 2015
20:30

Trenčín (Slovakia)	0–2	(Romania) Steaua București
	Report	Stanciu 63'; Hamroun 70'

Štadión pod Dubňom, Žilina (Note: Trenčín played their home match at Štadión pod Dubňom, Žilina, instead of their regular stadium Štadión na Sihoti, Trenčín.)
Attendance: 6,936
Referee: Alejandro Hernández Hernández (Spain)
22 July 2015
20:30

Steaua București (Romania)	2–3	(Slovakia) Trenčín
Muniru 57'; Tadé 60' (pen.)	Report	Wesley 13', 84'; Bero 21'

Arena Națională, Bucharest
Attendance: 0 (Note: Steaua București played their home matches behind closed doors due to UEFA punishment.)
Referee: Paweł Raczkowski (Poland)

Steaua București won 4–3 on aggregate.

14 July 2015
20:45

Partizan (Serbia)	1–0	(Georgia (country)) Dila Gori
Babović 83'	Report

Partizan Stadium, Belgrade
Attendance: 11,746
Referee: Bastian Dankert (Germany)
21 July 2015
14:30

Dila Gori (Georgia (country))	0–2	(Serbia) Partizan
	Report	Brašanac 37'; Oumarou 64'

Tengiz Burjanadze Stadium, Gori
Attendance: 3,842
Referee: Daniel Stefański (Poland)

Partizan won 3–0 on aggregate.

14 July 2015
19:45

Ludogorets Razgrad (Bulgaria)	0–1	(Moldova) Milsami Orhei
	Report	Antoniuc 41'

Ludogorets Arena, Razgrad
Attendance: 5,120
Referee: Antti Munukka (Finland)
21 July 2015
17:00

Milsami Orhei (Moldova)	2–1	(Bulgaria) Ludogorets Razgrad
Andronic 26'; Racu 89'	Report	Wanderson 25'

CSR Orhei, Orhei
Attendance: 2,970
Referee: Svein-Erik Edvartsen (Norway)

Milsami Orhei won 3–1 on aggregate.

15 July 2015
21:00

Dinamo Zagreb (Croatia)	1–1	(Luxembourg) Fola Esch
Henríquez 36'	Report	Hadji 25'

Stadion Maksimir, Zagreb
Attendance: 9,100
Referee: Neil Doyle (Republic of Ireland)
22 July 2015
20:00

Fola Esch (Luxembourg)	0–3	(Croatia) Dinamo Zagreb
	Report	Pjaca 29', 40'; Rog 75'

Stade Josy Barthel, Luxembourg City (Note: Fola Esch played their home match at Stade Josy Barthel, Luxembourg City, instead of their regular stadium Stade Émile Mayrisch, Esch-sur-Alzette.)
Attendance: 3,300
Referee: Sergey Tsinkevich (Belarus)

Dinamo Zagreb won 4–1 on aggregate.

14 July 2015
20:00

Skënderbeu (Albania)	4–1	(Northern Ireland) Crusaders
Nimaga 15'; Salihi 34', 83'; Berisha 76'	Report	Owens 48'

Skënderbeu Stadium, Korçë
Attendance: 5,500
Referee: Alexander Harkam (Austria)
21 July 2015
20:45

Crusaders (Northern Ireland)	3–2	(Albania) Skënderbeu
O'Flynn 50'; Snoddy 90+2'; Mitchell 90+3'	Report	Berisha 69'; Latifi 77'

Seaview, Belfast
Attendance: 1,548
Referee: Christos Nicolaides (Cyprus)

Skënderbeu won 6–4 on aggregate.

14 July 2015
20:00

The New Saints (Wales)	0–1	(Hungary) Videoton
	Report	Gyurcsó 77'

Park Hall, Oswestry
Attendance: 1,068
Referee: Ján Valášek (Slovakia)
22 July 2015
20:30

Videoton (Hungary)	1–1 (a.e.t.)	(Wales) The New Saints
Gyurcsó 107'	Report	Williams 78'

Sóstói Stadion, Székesfehérvár
Attendance: 3,268
Referee: Nerijus Dunauskas (Lithuania)

Videoton won 2–1 on aggregate.

== Third qualifying round ==
=== Seeding ===
The third qualifying round was split into two separate sections: Champions Route (for league champions) and League Route (for league non-champions). The losing teams in both sections entered the 2015–16 UEFA Europa League play-off round.

A total of 30 teams played in the third qualifying round:

- Champions Route: three teams which entered in this round, and the 17 winners of the second qualifying round.
- League Route: ten teams which entered in this round.

The draw was held on 17 July 2015.

Champions Route				League Route	
Group 1		Group 2		League Route	
Seeded	Unseeded	Seeded	Unseeded	Seeded	Unseeded
(Switzerland) Basel (Romania) Steaua București (Scotland) Celtic (Moldova) Milsami Orhei (Kazakhstan) Astana	(Poland) Lech Poznań (Serbia) Partizan (Azerbaijan) Qarabağ (Finland) HJK (Albania) Skënderbeu	(Austria) Red Bull Salzburg (Czech Republic) Viktoria Plzeň (Cyprus) APOEL (Belarus) BATE Borisov (Croatia) Dinamo Zagreb	(Israel) Maccabi Tel Aviv (Sweden) Malmö FF (Norway) Molde (Denmark) Midtjylland (Hungary) Videoton	(Ukraine) Shakhtar Donetsk (Netherlands) Ajax (Russia) CSKA Moscow (Belgium) Club Brugge (France) Monaco	(Switzerland) Young Boys (Czech Republic) Sparta Prague (Turkey) Fenerbahçe (Greece) Panathinaikos (Austria) Rapid Wien

Notes

1. ^{†} Winners of the second qualifying round, whose identity was not known at the time of the draw. Teams in italics defeated a team with a higher coefficient in the second qualifying round, thus effectively taking the coefficient of their defeated opponent in the draw for the third qualifying round.

=== Summary ===
The first legs were played on 28 and 29 July, and the second legs were played on 4 and 5 August 2015.

Team 1	Agg.	Team 2	1st leg	2nd leg
Champions Route
Lech Poznań (Poland)	1–4	(Switzerland) Basel	1–3	0–1
Milsami Orhei (Moldova)	0–4	(Albania) Skënderbeu	0–2	0–2
HJK (Finland)	3–4	(Kazakhstan) Astana	0–0	3–4
Celtic (Scotland)	1–0	(Azerbaijan) Qarabağ	1–0	0–0
Steaua București (Romania)	3–5	(Serbia) Partizan	1–1	2–4
Midtjylland (Denmark)	2–2 (a)	(Cyprus) APOEL	1–2	1–0
Maccabi Tel Aviv (Israel)	3–2	(Czech Republic) Viktoria Plzeň	1–2	2–0
Dinamo Zagreb (Croatia)	4–4 (a)	(Norway) Molde	1–1	3–3
Videoton (Hungary)	1–2	(Belarus) BATE Borisov	1–1	0–1
Red Bull Salzburg (Austria)	2–3	(Sweden) Malmö FF	2–0	0–3
League Route
Panathinaikos (Greece)	2–4	(Belgium) Club Brugge	2–1	0–3
Young Boys (Switzerland)	1–7	(France) Monaco	1–3	0–4
CSKA Moscow (Russia)	5–4	(Czech Republic) Sparta Prague	2–2	3–2
Rapid Wien (Austria)	5–4	(Netherlands) Ajax	2–2	3–2
Fenerbahçe (Turkey)	0–3	(Ukraine) Shakhtar Donetsk	0–0	0–3

=== Champions Route matches ===
29 July 2015
20:45

Lech Poznań (Poland)	1–3	(Switzerland) Basel
Thomalla 36'	Report	Lang 34'; Janko 77'; Callà 90+2'

INEA Stadion, Poznań
Attendance: 25,478
Referee: Anthony Taylor (England)
5 August 2015
20:15

Basel (Switzerland)	1–0	(Poland) Lech Poznań
Bjarnason 90+1'	Report

St. Jakob-Park, Basel
Attendance: 18,196
Referee: Ruddy Buquet (France)

Basel won 4–1 on aggregate.

28 July 2015
19:00

Milsami Orhei (Moldova)	0–2	(Albania) Skënderbeu
	Report	Salihi 49', 73' (pen.)

Zimbru Stadium, Chișinău (Note: Milsami Orhei played their third qualifying round home match at Zimbru Stadium, Chișinău, instead of their regular stadium CSR Orhei, Orhei.)
Attendance: 7,227
Referee: Hüseyin Göçek (Turkey)
5 August 2015
20:45

Skënderbeu (Albania)	2–0	(Moldova) Milsami Orhei
Salihi 16'; Progni 55'	Report

Elbasan Arena, Elbasan (Note: Skënderbeu played their third qualifying and play-off rounds home matches at Elbasan Arena, Elbasan, instead of their regular stadium Skënderbeu Stadium, Korçë.)
Attendance: 7,800
Referee: Artur Soares Dias (Portugal)

Skënderbeu won 4–0 on aggregate.

29 July 2015
18:00

HJK (Finland)	0–0	(Kazakhstan) Astana
	Report

Sonera Stadium, Helsinki
Attendance: 9,788
Referee: Alexandru Tudor (Romania)
5 August 2015
16:00

Astana (Kazakhstan)	4–3	(Finland) HJK
Twumasi 44'; Cañas 47' (pen.); Shomko 56'; Postnikov 90+3'	Report	Jallow 4'; Baah 42'; Zeneli 86' (pen.)

Astana Arena, Astana
Attendance: 27,937
Referee: Alon Yefet (Israel)

Astana won 4–3 on aggregate.

29 July 2015
20:45

Celtic (Scotland)	1–0	(Azerbaijan) Qarabağ
Boyata 82'	Report

Celtic Park, Glasgow
Attendance: 43,011
Referee: Robert Schörgenhofer (Austria)
5 August 2015
18:30

Qarabağ (Azerbaijan)	0–0	(Scotland) Celtic
	Report

Tofiq Bahramov Republican Stadium, Baku
Attendance: 31,850
Referee: Martin Strömbergsson (Sweden)

Celtic won 1–0 on aggregate.

29 July 2015
20:30

Steaua București (Romania)	1–1	(Serbia) Partizan
Varela 81'	Report	Vulićević 62'

Arena Națională, Bucharest
Attendance: 0
Referee: Kevin Blom (Netherlands)
5 August 2015
20:30

Partizan (Serbia)	4–2	(Romania) Steaua București
Babović 8'; Jevtović 60'; A. Živković 70'; Trujić 90+1'	Report	Muniru 11'; Hamroun 33'

Partizan Stadium, Belgrade
Attendance: 26,775
Referee: István Vad (Hungary)

Partizan won 5–3 on aggregate.

28 July 2015
19:00

Midtjylland (Denmark)	1–2	(Cyprus) APOEL
Poulsen 88'	Report	Hansen 30' (o.g.); De Vincenti 33'

MCH Arena, Herning
Attendance: 8,253
Referee: Slavko Vinčić (Slovenia)
4 August 2015
19:00

APOEL (Cyprus)	0–1	(Denmark) Midtjylland
	Report	Sviatchenko 3'

GSP Stadium, Nicosia
Attendance: 16,070
Referee: Bobby Madden (Scotland)

2–2 on aggregate; APOEL won on away goals.

28 July 2015
19:30

Maccabi Tel Aviv (Israel)	1–2	(Czech Republic) Viktoria Plzeň
Yitzhaki 79'	Report	Mahmutović 17'; Petržela 21'

Bloomfield Stadium, Tel Aviv
Attendance: 13,420
Referee: Aleksei Kulbakov (Belarus)
5 August 2015
20:45

Viktoria Plzeň (Czech Republic)	0–2	(Israel) Maccabi Tel Aviv
	Report	Zahavi 76' (pen.), 83'

Doosan Arena, Plzeň
Attendance: 11,242
Referee: Yevhen Aranovskyi (Ukraine)

Maccabi Tel Aviv won 3–2 on aggregate.

28 July 2015
21:00

Dinamo Zagreb (Croatia)	1–1	(Norway) Molde
Henríquez 18'	Report	Kamara 21'

Stadion Maksimir, Zagreb
Attendance: 9,327
Referee: Serge Gumienny (Belgium)
4 August 2015
19:00

Molde (Norway)	3–3	(Croatia) Dinamo Zagreb
Hussain 43'; Elyounoussi 52' (pen.); Kamara 75'	Report	Pjaca 17'; Ademi 20'; Rog 22'

Aker Stadion, Molde
Attendance: 7,017
Referee: Michael Oliver (England)

4–4 on aggregate; Dinamo Zagreb won on away goals.

28 July 2015
20:30

Videoton (Hungary)	1–1	(Belarus) BATE Borisov
Vinícius 89'	Report	Karnitsky 56'

Sóstói Stadion, Székesfehérvár
Attendance: 3,118
Referee: Aleksandar Stavrev (Macedonia)
5 August 2015
19:30

BATE Borisov (Belarus)	1–0	(Hungary) Videoton
Nikolić 82'	Report

Borisov Arena, Barysaw
Attendance: 12,498
Referee: Kenn Hansen (Denmark)

BATE Borisov won 2–1 on aggregate.

29 July 2015
19:00

Red Bull Salzburg (Austria)	2–0	(Sweden) Malmö FF
Ulmer 51'; Hinteregger 89' (pen.)	Report

Red Bull Arena, Wals-Siezenheim
Attendance: 15,027
Referee: Luca Banti (Italy)
5 August 2015
20:30

Malmö FF (Sweden)	3–0	(Austria) Red Bull Salzburg
Đurđić 7'; Rosenberg 14'; Rodić 42'	Report

Swedbank Stadion, Malmö
Attendance: 19,522
Referee: Michael Koukoulakis (Greece)

Malmö FF won 3–2 on aggregate.

=== League Route matches ===
28 July 2015
20:00

Panathinaikos (Greece)	2–1	(Belgium) Club Brugge
Berg 37'; Karelis 65' (pen.)	Report	Bolingoli-Mbombo 10'

Leoforos Alexandras Stadium, Athens
Attendance: 12,874
Referee: Vladislav Bezborodov (Russia)
5 August 2015
20:30

Club Brugge (Belgium)	3–0	(Greece) Panathinaikos
Cools 53'; Vázquez 58'; Oularé 82'	Report

Jan Breydel Stadium, Bruges
Attendance: 27,038
Referee: Stefan Johannesson (Sweden)

Club Brugge won 4–2 on aggregate.

28 July 2015
20:15

Young Boys (Switzerland)	1–3	(France) Monaco
Nuzzolo 74'	Report	Kurzawa 64'; Carrillo 72'; Pašalić 75'

Stade de Suisse, Bern
Attendance: 16,079
Referee: Matej Jug (Slovenia)
4 August 2015
20:45

Monaco (France)	4–0	(Switzerland) Young Boys
Cavaleiro 54'; Kurzawa 64'; Martial 70'; El Shaarawy 77'	Report

Stade Louis II, Monaco
Attendance: 10,457
Referee: Danny Makkelie (Netherlands)

Monaco won 7–1 on aggregate.

28 July 2015
18:15

CSKA Moscow (Russia)	2–2	(Czech Republic) Sparta Prague
Dzagoev 14'; Tošić 53'	Report	Fatai 15'; Krejčí 57'

Arena Khimki, Khimki
Attendance: 10,500
Referee: Xavier Estrada Fernández (Spain)
5 August 2015
18:45

Sparta Prague (Czech Republic)	2–3	(Russia) CSKA Moscow
Krejčí 6'; Fatai 16'	Report	Musa 34', 51'; Dzagoev 76'

Generali Arena, Prague
Attendance: 16,580
Referee: Paolo Mazzoleni (Italy)

CSKA Moscow won 5–4 on aggregate.

29 July 2015
21:05

Rapid Wien (Austria)	2–2	(Netherlands) Ajax
Kainz 48'; Berić 76'	Report	Klaassen 25', 43'

Ernst-Happel-Stadion, Vienna
Attendance: 43,200
Referee: Willie Collum (Scotland)
4 August 2015
20:15

Ajax (Netherlands)	2–3	(Austria) Rapid Wien
Milik 52'; Gudelj 75'	Report	Berić 12'; Schaub 39', 77'

Amsterdam Arena, Amsterdam
Attendance: 53,502
Referee: Ivan Kružliak (Slovakia)

Rapid Wien won 5–4 on aggregate.

28 July 2015
20:00

Fenerbahçe (Turkey)	0–0	(Ukraine) Shakhtar Donetsk
	Report

Şükrü Saracoğlu Stadium, Istanbul
Attendance: 37,342
Referee: Jorge Sousa (Portugal)
5 August 2015
20:45

Shakhtar Donetsk (Ukraine)	3–0	(Turkey) Fenerbahçe
Hladkyy 25'; Srna 65' (pen.); Teixeira 68'	Report

Arena Lviv, Lviv (Note: Shakhtar Donetsk played their home matches at Arena Lviv, Lviv, instead of their regular stadium, the Donbas Arena in Donetsk, due to the war in Donbas.)
Attendance: 33,179
Referee: Felix Zwayer (Germany)

Shakhtar Donetsk won 3–0 on aggregate.

== Play-off round ==
=== Seeding ===
The play-off round was split into two sections: Champions Route (for league champions) and League Route (for league non-champions). The losing teams in both sections entered the 2015–16 UEFA Europa League group stage.

A total of 20 teams played in the play-off round:

- Champions Route: the ten Champions Route winners of the third qualifying round.
- League Route: five teams which entered in this round, and the five League Route winners of the third qualifying round.

The draw was held on 7 August 2015.

Champions Route		League Route	
Seeded	Unseeded	Seeded	Unseeded
(Switzerland) Basel (Scotland) Celtic (Cyprus) APOEL (Belarus) BATE Borisov (Croatia) Dinamo Zagreb	(Israel) Maccabi Tel Aviv (Serbia) Partizan (Sweden) Malmö FF (Albania) Skënderbeu (Kazakhstan) Astana	(England) Manchester United (Spain) Valencia (Germany) Bayer Leverkusen (Ukraine) Shakhtar Donetsk (Portugal) Sporting CP	(Russia) CSKA Moscow (Italy) Lazio (Belgium) Club Brugge (France) Monaco (Austria) Rapid Wien

Notes

1. ^{‡} Due to UEFA's decision in preventing Russian and Ukrainian teams playing each other, Shakhtar Donetsk could not be drawn against CSKA Moscow.

=== Summary ===
The first legs were played on 18 and 19 August, and the second legs were played on 25 and 26 August 2015.

Team 1	Agg.	Team 2	1st leg	2nd leg
Champions Route
Astana (Kazakhstan)	2–1	(Cyprus) APOEL	1–0	1–1
Skënderbeu (Albania)	2–6	(Croatia) Dinamo Zagreb	1–2	1–4
Celtic (Scotland)	3–4	(Sweden) Malmö FF	3–2	0–2
Basel (Switzerland)	3–3 (a)	(Israel) Maccabi Tel Aviv	2–2	1–1
BATE Borisov (Belarus)	2–2 (a)	(Serbia) Partizan	1–0	1–2
League Route
Lazio (Italy)	1–3	(Germany) Bayer Leverkusen	1–0	0–3
Manchester United (England)	7–1	(Belgium) Club Brugge	3–1	4–0
Sporting CP (Portugal)	3–4	(Russia) CSKA Moscow	2–1	1–3
Rapid Wien (Austria)	2–3	(Ukraine) Shakhtar Donetsk	0–1	2–2
Valencia (Spain)	4–3	(France) Monaco	3–1	1–2

=== Champions Route matches ===
18 August 2015
18:00

Astana (Kazakhstan)	1–0	(Cyprus) APOEL
Dzholchiyev 14'	Report

Astana Arena, Astana
Attendance: 30,000
Referee: Viktor Kassai (Hungary)
26 August 2015
20:45

APOEL (Cyprus)	1–1	(Kazakhstan) Astana
Štilić 60'	Report	Maksimović 84'

GSP Stadium, Nicosia
Attendance: 17,699
Referee: Martin Atkinson (England)

Astana won 2–1 on aggregate.

19 August 2015
20:45

Skënderbeu (Albania)	1–2	(Croatia) Dinamo Zagreb
Shkëmbi 37'	Report	Soudani 66'; Pivarić 90+3'

Elbasan Arena, Elbasan
Attendance: 12,163
Referee: Sergei Karasev (Russia)
25 August 2015
20:45

Dinamo Zagreb (Croatia)	4–1	(Albania) Skënderbeu
Soudani 9', 80'; Hodžić 15'; Taravel 55'	Report	Esquerdinha 10'

Stadion Maksimir, Zagreb
Attendance: 16,888
Referee: Gianluca Rocchi (Italy)

Dinamo Zagreb won 6–2 on aggregate.

19 August 2015
20:45

Celtic (Scotland)	3–2	(Sweden) Malmö FF
Griffiths 3', 61'; Bitton 10'	Report	Berget 52', 90+5'

Celtic Park, Glasgow
Attendance: 52,412
Referee: Felix Brych (Germany)
25 August 2015
20:45

Malmö FF (Sweden)	2–0	(Scotland) Celtic
Rosenberg 23'; Boyata 54' (o.g.)	Report

Swedbank Stadion, Malmö
Attendance: 20,500
Referee: Milorad Mažić (Serbia)

Malmö FF won 4–3 on aggregate.

19 August 2015
20:45

Basel (Switzerland)	2–2	(Israel) Maccabi Tel Aviv
Delgado 39' (pen.); Embolo 88'	Report	Zahavi 31', 90+6'

St. Jakob-Park, Basel
Attendance: 15,620
Referee: Willie Collum (Scotland)
25 August 2015
20:45

Maccabi Tel Aviv (Israel)	1–1	(Switzerland) Basel
Zahavi 24'	Report	Zuffi 11'

Bloomfield Stadium, Tel Aviv
Attendance: 13,350
Referee: Damir Skomina (Slovenia)

3–3 on aggregate; Maccabi Tel Aviv won on away goals.

18 August 2015
20:45

BATE Borisov (Belarus)	1–0	(Serbia) Partizan
Gordeichuk 75'	Report

Borisov Arena, Barysaw
Attendance: 11,628
Referee: Craig Thomson (Scotland)
26 August 2015
20:45

Partizan (Serbia)	2–1	(Belarus) BATE Borisov
Zhavnerchik 74' (o.g.); Šaponjić 90+3'	Report	Stasevich 25'

Partizan Stadium, Belgrade
Attendance: 27,234
Referee: Svein Oddvar Moen (Norway)

2–2 on aggregate; BATE Borisov won on away goals.

=== League Route matches ===
18 August 2015
20:45

Lazio (Italy)	1–0	(Germany) Bayer Leverkusen
Keita 77'	Report

Stadio Olimpico, Rome
Attendance: 38,917
Referee: Jonas Eriksson (Sweden)
26 August 2015
20:45

Bayer Leverkusen (Germany)	3–0	(Italy) Lazio
Çalhanoğlu 40'; Mehmedi 48'; Bellarabi 88'	Report

BayArena, Leverkusen
Attendance: 28,222
Referee: Carlos Velasco Carballo (Spain)

Bayer Leverkusen won 3–1 on aggregate.

18 August 2015
20:45

Manchester United (England)	3–1	(Belgium) Club Brugge
Depay 13', 43'; Fellaini 90+4'	Report	Carrick 8' (o.g.)

Old Trafford, Manchester
Attendance: 75,312
Referee: Deniz Aytekin (Germany)
26 August 2015
20:45

Club Brugge (Belgium)	0–4	(England) Manchester United
	Report	Rooney 20', 49', 57'; Herrera 63'

Jan Breydel Stadium, Bruges
Attendance: 28,733
Referee: Antonio Mateu Lahoz (Spain)

Manchester United won 7–1 on aggregate.

18 August 2015
20:45

Sporting CP (Portugal)	2–1	(Russia) CSKA Moscow
Gutiérrez 12'; Slimani 82'	Report	Doumbia 40'

Estádio José Alvalade, Lisbon
Attendance: 41,826
Referee: Cüneyt Çakır (Turkey)
26 August 2015
20:45

CSKA Moscow (Russia)	3–1	(Portugal) Sporting CP
Doumbia 49', 72'; Musa 85'	Report	Gutiérrez 36'

Arena Khimki, Khimki
Attendance: 17,259
Referee: Pavel Královec (Czech Republic)

CSKA Moscow won 4–3 on aggregate.

19 August 2015
20:45

Rapid Wien (Austria)	0–1	(Ukraine) Shakhtar Donetsk
	Report	Marlos 44'

Ernst-Happel-Stadion, Vienna
Attendance: 46,400
Referee: Björn Kuipers (Netherlands)
25 August 2015
20:45

Shakhtar Donetsk (Ukraine)	2–2	(Austria) Rapid Wien
Marlos 10'; Hladkyy 27'	Report	Schaub 13'; S. Hofmann 22'

Arena Lviv, Lviv
Attendance: 28,417
Referee: Szymon Marciniak (Poland)

Shakhtar Donetsk won 3–2 on aggregate.

19 August 2015
20:45

Valencia (Spain)	3–1	(France) Monaco
Rodrigo 4'; Parejo 59'; Feghouli 86'	Report	Pašalić 49'

Mestalla, Valencia
Attendance: 45,633
Referee: Mark Clattenburg (England)
25 August 2015
20:45

Monaco (France)	2–1	(Spain) Valencia
Raggi 17'; Elderson 75'	Report	Negredo 4'

Stade Louis II, Monaco
Attendance: 13,165
Referee: Nicola Rizzoli (Italy)

Valencia won 4–3 on aggregate.

== Statistics ==
There were 240 goals in 92 matches in the qualifying phase and play-off round, for an average of 2.61 goals per match.

=== Top goalscorers ===
Rank	Player	Team	Goals	Minutes played
1	(Israel) Eran Zahavi	(Israel) Maccabi Tel Aviv	7	450
2	(Albania) Hamdi Salihi	(Albania) Skënderbeu	5	438
3	(Norway) Ola Kamara	(Norway) Molde	4	331
3	(England) Michael Wilde	(Wales) The New Saints	4	368
5	(England) Wayne Rooney	(England) Manchester United	3	174
5	(Ivory Coast) Seydou Doumbia	(Russia) CSKA Moscow	3	178
5	(Scotland) Leigh Griffiths	(Scotland) Celtic	3	268
5	(Austria) Louis Schaub	(Austria) Rapid Wien	3	284
5	(Norway) Mohamed Elyounoussi	(Norway) Molde	3	360
5	(Nigeria) Ahmed Musa	(Russia) CSKA Moscow	3	360
5	(Algeria) Hillal Soudani	(Croatia) Dinamo Zagreb	3	479
5	(Croatia) Marko Pjaca	(Croatia) Dinamo Zagreb	3	527

Source: UEFA.com

=== Top assists ===
Rank	Player	Team	Assists	Minutes played
1	(Norway) Stefan Johansen	(Scotland) Celtic	4	540
2	(Brazil) Jairo da Silva	(Slovakia) Trenčín	3	177
2	(Finland) Roman Eremenko	(Russia) CSKA Moscow	3	360
2	(Denmark) Jakob Poulsen	(Denmark) Midtjylland	3	360
2	(Serbia) Andrija Živković	(Serbia) Partizan	3	479
6	23 players		2	—N/a

Source: UEFA.com
