= 2015–16 Macedonian Second Football League =

Macedonian Second League
- Season: 2015–16
- Champions: Pobeda
- Promoted: Pobeda; Makedonija G.P. Pelister
- Relegated: Gostivar; Kozhuf
- Matches: 135
- Goals: 296 (2.19 per match)
- Top goalscorer: Kristijan Stojkoski (14 goals)
- Biggest home win: Ljubanci 5–0 Euromilk
- Biggest away win: Kozhuf 0–3 Skopje; Makedonija G.P. 0–3 Velazerimi; Pelister 1–4 Pobeda
- Highest scoring: Skopje 3–3 Pobeda
- Longest winning run: 7 games Pobeda
- Longest unbeaten run: 12 games Pelister
- Longest winless run: 8 games Kozhuf
- Longest losing run: 7 games Kozhuf

The 2015–16 Macedonian Second Football League was the 24th season of the Macedonian Second Football League, the second football division of Macedonia. It began on 15 August 2015 and ended on 14 May 2016.

== Participating teams ==
Location of teams in 2015–16 Macedonian Second League

Club	City	Stadium	Capacity
Euromilk Gorno Lisiche	Skopje	Stadion Cementarnica	2,000
Gostivar	Gostivar	Gradski stadion Gostivar	1,000
Ljubanci 1974	Ljubanci	Stadion Gjorche Petrov	3,000
Kozhuf Miravci	Gevgelija	Gradski stadion Gevgelija	2,500
Makedonija G.P.	Skopje	Stadion Gjorche Petrov	3,000
Pelister	Bitola	Stadion Tumbe Kafe	8,000
Pobeda	Prilep	Stadium Goce Delchev	15,000
Skopje	Skopje	Stadion Avtokomanda	4,000
Teteks	Tetovo	Gradski stadion Tetovo	15,000
Velazerimi 77	Kichevo	Velazerimi Arena	3,000

== League table ==
Pos	Team	Pld	W	D	L	GF	GA	GD	Pts	Promotion or relegation
1	Pobeda (C, P)	27	13	8	6	40	23	+17	47	Promotion to Macedonian First League
2	Makedonija G.P. (P)	27	13	7	7	35	33	+2	46	Promotion to Macedonian First League
3	Pelister (P)	27	9	12	6	33	32	+1	39	Qualification to Promotion play-off
4	Teteks	27	10	9	8	27	25	+2	39	
5	Vëllazërimi	27	10	8	9	30	30	0	38	
6	Skopje	27	9	9	9	27	23	+4	36	
7	Euromilk Gorno Lisiche	27	9	9	9	26	29	−3	36	
8	Ljubanci (O)	27	9	7	11	32	31	+1	34	Qualification to Relegation play-off
9	Gostivar (R)	27	9	6	12	29	34	−5	33	Relegation to Macedonian Third League
10	Kozhuf Miravci (R)	27	4	5	18	17	36	−19	17	Relegation to Macedonian Third League

Source: MacedonianFootball.com, Soccerway
Rules for classification: 1) Points; 2) Head-to-head points; 3) Head-to-head goal difference; 4) Head-to-head away goals scored
(C) Champions; (O) Play-off winners; (P) Promoted; (R) Relegated

== Results ==
=== Matches 1–18 ===
Home \ Away	EGL	GOS	LJU	MGP	MIR	PEL	POB	SKO	TET	VLZ
Euromilk Gorno Lisiche	—	0–0	0–1	2–2	1–1	1–1	1–1	2–1	1–1	2–1
Gostivar	0–2	—	4–2	0–1	3–0	1–2	1–1	0–0	0–1	1–1
Ljubanci 1974	5–0	0–2	—	3–2	0–1	1–0	0–1	2–1	2–2	1–1
Makedonija	2–1	3–0	3–2	—	1–0	2–2	0–0	3–2	0–1	0–3
Miravci	0–1	3–0	1–1	0–1	—	2–1	0–1	0–3	0–1	0–2
Pelister	1–2	1–1	3–1	1–1	1–1	—	2–1	0–2	0–0	0–0
Pobeda	1–2	1–2	3–0	0–1	2–1	1–1	—	0–0	1–1	1–1
Skopje	1–0	1–0	0–1	2–1	1–0	0–1	3–3	—	0–0	3–2
Teteks	1–0	1–0	1–1	4–0	1–0	1–1	1–3	0–0	—	1–2
Vëllazërimi	2–0	1–2	0–1	1–1	2–2	1–1	2–1	1–0	2–1	—

Source: MacedonianFootball.com
Legend: Blue = home team win; Yellow = draw; Red = away team win.

=== Matches 19–27 ===
Home \ Away	EGL	GOS	LJU	MGP	MIR	PEL	POB	SKO	TET	VLZ
Euromilk Gorno Lisiche	—	1–1	—	—	1–0	2–0	1–2	—	—	—
Gostivar	—	—	3–2	—	—	1–2	—	—	4–1	2–1
Ljubanci 1974	2–0	—	—	—	0–1	0–0	—	—	0–1	4–0
Makedonija	1–0	1–0	0–0	—	—	—	1–3	—	—	1–0
Miravci	—	0–1	—	1–3	—	—	0–2	1–1	—	—
Pelister	—	—	—	3–1	3–2	—	1–4	1–0	—	—
Pobeda	—	3–0	1–0	—	—	—	—	—	1–0	2–0
Skopje	1–1	2–0	0–0	1–1	—	—	1–0	—	—	—
Teteks	0–0	—	—	1–2	1–0	2–3	—	2–1	—	—
Vëllazërimi	0–2	—	—	—	1–0	1–1	—	1–0	1–0	—

Source: MacedonianFootball.com
Legend: Blue = home team win; Yellow = draw; Red = away team win.

== Promotion play-off ==
=== First leg ===
25 May 2016
16:00 CEST

Horizont Turnovo	1–2	Pelister
Pandev 4'	Report	Markovski 23' (pen.), 29' (pen.)

Stadion Gjorche Petrov, Skopje
Attendance: 400
Referee: Josip Barton (Tetovo)

=== Second leg ===
29 May 2016
16:00 CEST

Pelister	1–0	Horizont Turnovo
Cvetanoski 62'	Report

Stadion Gjorche Petrov, Skopje
Attendance: 800
Referee: Aleksandar Stavrev (Skopje)

Pelister won 3–1 on aggregate.

== Relegation play-off ==
The Relegation Playoff includes 6 clubs (the 8th placed theam from the Second League, as well as the 5 winners of the Third Leagues) which are going to be arranged in 3 pairs, playing on home-away rule. The winners of those playoffs win a spot for the next seasons Second League.

=== First leg ===
25 May 2016
16:00 CEST

Ljubanci	3–1	Novaci
Hadzija 8', 53', 88'		Veljanoski 24'

Gradski stadion, Kichevo
25 May 2016
16:00 CEST

Akademija Pandev	2–1	Goblen
own goal 31'; Zlatkovski 51'		Memedi 16'

Stadion Nikola Mantov, Kochani
29 May 2016
16:00 CEST

Vardar Negotino	3–0	Vardari Forino

Stadion Goce Delchev, Prilep

=== Second leg ===
29 May 2016
16:00 CEST

Novaci	2–0 (a.e.t.)	Ljubanci
Penalties
	3–5

Gradski stadion, Kichevo

3–3 on aggregate. Ljubanci won 5–3 in penalty shootout.

29 May 2016
16:00 CEST

Goblen	1–3	Akademija Pandev

Stadion Nikola Mantov, Kochani

Akademija Pandev won 5–2 on aggregate.

1 June 2016
16:00 CEST

Vardari Forino	0–2	Vardar Negotino
		Chaushev 24'; Najdov 67'

Stadion Goce Delchev, Prilep

Vardar Negotino won 5–0 on aggregate.

== Season statistics ==
=== Top scorers ===
As of 14 May 2016

Rank	Player	Club	Goals
1	(North Macedonia) Kristijan Stojkoski	Makedonija GP	13
2	(North Macedonia) Blagoja Geshoski	Pobeda	12
3	(North Macedonia) Darko Shterjov	Kozhuf	9
4	(North Macedonia) Benjamin Demir	Teteks	8
5	(North Macedonia) Dario Desnikj	Skopje	7
5	(North Macedonia) Boban Janchevski	Makedonija GP	7
7	(North Macedonia) Jovanche Dunimagloski	Pobeda	6
7	(North Macedonia) Blagojche Glavevski	Pelister	6
7	(North Macedonia) Alen Jasharoski	Euromilk GL	6
7	(North Macedonia) Boban Marikj	Gostivar	6
7	(North Macedonia) Nikola Sharkoski	Pobeda	6
7	(North Macedonia) Ive Trifunovski	Pelister	6

Source: MacedonianFootball.com

== See also ==
- 2015–16 Macedonian Football Cup
- 2015–16 Macedonian First Football League
- 2015–16 Macedonian Third Football League
