= Stefan Ristovski (footballer, born December 1992) =

Macedonian footballer

Personal information
- Full name: Stefan Ristovski; Стефан Ристовски
- Date of birth: 21 December 1992 (age 33)
- Place of birth: Macedonia
- Position: Defender

Youth career
- –2010: Vardar
- 2011: Celje

Senior career*
Years	Team	Apps	(Gls)
2010	Vardar	5	(0)
2011–2013	Celje	11	(0)
2012–2013	→ Šmartno 1928 (loan)	19	(1)
2013–2014	Turnovo	18	(1)
2014–2017	Bregalnica Štip	88	(3)
- * Club domestic league appearances and goals as of 09:43, 28 April 2013 (UTC)

Stefan Ristovski (Macedonian: Стефан Ристовски) (born 21 December 1992 in Republic of Macedonia) is a Macedonian football player.
