= Kire Markoski =

Macedonian footballer (born 1995)

Personal information
- Full name: Kire Markoski; Кире Маркоски
- Date of birth: 20 February 1995 (age 31)
- Place of birth: Ohrid, Macedonia
- Height: 1.82 m (6 ft 0 in)
- Position: Winger

Youth career
- Rabotnički Skopje

Senior career*
Years	Team	Apps	(Gls)
2012–2018	Rabotnički Skopje	113	(26)
2018–2019	AEL Limassol	13	(1)
2019	→ Spartak Trnava (loan)	12	(1)
2020–2021	Akademija Pandev	12	(2)
2021–2022	Shkupi	16	(2)
2022	Shkëndija	9	(1)
2022	Vardar	7	(4)
2023–2024	Rabotnički	14	(2)
2024–2025	Makedonija GP	11	(1)

International career^{‡}
2013–2017	Macedonia U21	16	(6)
2014–	Macedonia	5	(1)
- * Club domestic league appearances and goals as of 10 January 2026 ‡ National team caps and goals as of 25 March 2019

Kire Markoski (Macedonian: Кире Маркоски; born 20 February 1995) is a Macedonian footballer who plays for the Macedonia national football team as a winger.

== Club career ==
=== Rabotnički ===
On 6 August 2015, Markoski scored his first European goal, a 112th-minute winner in a 1–1 extra-time (2–1 aggregate) win over Turkish side Trabzonspor in the second leg of the Europa League third qualifying round.

== International career ==
Markoski made his senior debut in a friendly on 18 June 2014, a 2–0 loss against China.

=== International goals ===
Scores and results list North Macedonia's goal tally first.

No	Date	Venue	Opponent	Score	Result	Competition
1.	11 November 2017	Philip II Arena, Skopje, Macedonia	Norway	2–0	2–0	Friendly

== Honours ==
Rabotnički

- Macedonian First League: 2013–14
- Macedonian Cup: 2013–14, 2014–15

Spartak Trnava

- Slovak Cup: 2018–19
