= Marjan Altiparmakovski =

Macedonian footballer

Personal information
- Date of birth: 18 July 1991 (age 35)
- Place of birth: Bitola, SR Macedonia, SFR Yugoslavia
- Height: 1.85 m (6 ft 1 in)
- Positions: Striker; second striker

Team information
- Current team: Vardar
- Number: 10

Youth career
- –2009: Pelister

Senior career*
Years	Team	Apps	(Gls)
2009–2010	Pelister	25	(6)
2010–2013	Skoda Xanthi	4	(1)
2013	Pelister	18	(3)
2014	Paniliakos	10	(2)
2014–2016	Rabotnički	63	(20)
2016–2017	Inter Zaprešić	10	(0)
2017	Sūduva	21	(5)
2018	Sarajevo	2	(0)
2018	Laçi	14	(1)
2019–2020	Pirin Blagoevgrad	1	(0)
2020–2021	Struga	29	(7)
2021–2023	Bregalnica Štip	54	(11)
2023	Radnički Beograd	6	(0)
2024–	Vardar	14	(1)

International career
2007	Macedonia U17	1	(0)
2010–2012	Macedonia U21	13	(1)
- * Club domestic league appearances and goals as of 26 May 2024

Marjan Altiparmakovski (Macedonian: Марјан Алтипармаковски; born 18 July 1991) is a Macedonian footballer who plays as a striker for Vardar. Marjan Altiparmakovski at Soccerway (archived) He also has Croatian nationality.

== Career ==
Altiparmakovski started his career with FK Pelister of Bitola. He signed a five-year deal with Skoda Xanthi on 5 July 2010, but departed the club in May 2013. He then returned to Macedonia and FK Pelister. In January 2014, Altiparmakovski agreed a contract with Paniliakos. Before the 2017 season, he joined Lithuanian A Lyga side Sūduva. Altiparmakovski signed for FK Sarajevo on 7 February 2018. He had a spell with Bulgarian club Pirin Blagoevgrad between September 2019 and April 2020, during which he struggled with injuries..On 16 July 2020, he joined Macedonian side Struga.
