= Saša Bakarić =

Slovenian footballer

Personal information
- Full name: Saša Bakarić
- Date of birth: 18 March 1987 (age 39)
- Place of birth: Celje, SFR Yugoslavia
- Height: 1.77 m (5 ft 10 in)
- Positions: Midfielder; full-back

Team information
- Current team: SC Kappel
- Number: 9

Youth career
- –2006: Celje

Senior career*
Years	Team	Apps	(Gls)
2005–2012	Celje	124	(5)
2006–2008	→ Zagorje (loan)	26	(1)
2008	→ MU Šentjur (loan)	10	(3)
2012–2013	Rudar Velenje	14	(0)
2014	SV Wildon	11	(0)
2014	SV Mühlgraben	15	(5)
2015	SVU Wolfsberg	26	(6)
2016–2017	USV Wies	36	(9)
2017–2018	SV Eberstein	29	(0)
2018–	SC Kappel	73	(10)

International career
2006–2007	Slovenia U20	4	(0)
2007	Slovenia U21	1	(0)
- * Club domestic league appearances and goals as of 3 August 2023

Saša Bakarić (born 18 March 1987) is a Slovenian footballer who plays for Austrian club SC Kappel.

== Club career ==
After a lengthy spell at hometown club Celje, Bakarić moved abroad to play in the Austrian lower leagues.
