= FK Ljubanci 1974 =

- Full name: Fudbalski Klub Ljubanci 1974
- Founded: 1974
- Ground: Gjorče Petrov Stadium
- Capacity: 3,000
- League: none
- 2015–16: Macedonian Second League, 8th (withdraw)

FK Ljubanci 1974 (Macedonian: ФК Љубанци 1974) is a football club based in the village of Ljubanci near Skopje, Republic of Macedonia. They was recently played in the Macedonian Second League.

== History ==
The club was founded in 1974.

== Current squad ==
As of 8 July 2015

Note: Flags indicate national team as defined under FIFA eligibility rules; some limited exceptions apply. Players may hold more than one non-FIFA nationality.

No.	Pos.	Nation	Player
12	GK	(North Macedonia) MKD	Viktor Ivanovikj
—	GK	(North Macedonia) MKD	Borche Kartov
2	DF	(North Macedonia) MKD	Vane Pandev
6	DF	(North Macedonia) MKD	Kirche Krstevski
—	DF	(North Macedonia) MKD	Martin Shishkov

No.	Pos.	Nation	Player
9	MF	(North Macedonia) MKD	Darko Lazarevski
11	MF	(North Macedonia) MKD	Robert Mitev
15	MF	(North Macedonia) MKD	Ivo Janakievski
17	MF	(North Macedonia) MKD	Zoran Nedeski
—	FW	(North Macedonia) MKD	Trajche Krstev
—	FW	(North Macedonia) MKD	Stojanche Nasevski
