= 2013–14 Macedonian Second Football League =

Macedonian Second League
- Season: 2013–14
- Champions: Sileks
- Promoted: Sileks; Teteks
- Relegated: Vrapchishte; Zajazi; Pobeda Junior; Tiverija; Madjari Solidarnost; Novaci; Lokomotiva; 11 Oktomvri; Borec; Rufeja

The 2013–14 Macedonian Second Football League was the 22nd season since its establishment. It began on 10 August 2013 and ended on 17 May 2014. This was the final season with 16 teams, because the Football Federation of Macedonia approved reducing the league to 10 teams. Therefore, the 3 teams from 7th and 9th position played relegation play-offs, and the 7 teams were directly relegated.

== Participating teams ==
Location of teams in 2013–14 Macedonian Second League

Club	City	Stadium	Capacity
11 Oktomvri	Prilep	Stadion Goce Delchev	15,000
Borec	Veles	Gradski stadion Veles	2,000
Drita	Bogovinje	Stadion Bogovinje	500
Lokomotiva	Skopje	Komunalec Stadium	1,000
Madjari Solidarnost	Skopje	Boris Trajkovski Stadium	3,000
Miravci	Miravci	Stadion Miravci	1,000
Novaci 2005	Novaci	Stadion Novaci	500
Pobeda Junior	Prilep	Stadion Goce Delchev	15,000
Rufeja	Miletino, Brvenica	Stadion Miletino	500
Shkupi^{1}	Skopje	Chair Stadium	6,000
Sileks	Kratovo	Stadion Sileks	1,800
Skopje	Skopje	Stadion Avtokomanda	4,000
Teteks	Tetovo	Gradski stadion Tetovo	15,000
Tiverija	Strumica	Stadion Mladost	6,500
Vrapchishte	Vrapchishte	Vrapchishte Stadium	500
Zajazi	Zajas	Gradski stadion Kičevo	5,000

^{1} Shkupi was in the first part of season participated as Korzo.

== League table ==
Pos	Team	Pld	W	D	L	GF	GA	GD	Pts	Promotion or relegation
1	Sileks (C, P)	29	20	4	5	66	24	+42	64	Promotion to the Macedonian First League
2	Teteks (P)	29	18	6	5	54	20	+34	60	Promotion to the Macedonian First League
3	Skopje	29	16	5	8	48	32	+16	53	
4	Drita (Note: Drita were deducted 3 points.)	29	16	7	6	46	26	+20	52 (Note: Head-to-head record: Drita 9 pts, Vrapchishte 6 pts, Shkupi 3 pts.)	
5	Vrapchishte (Note: Vrapchishte was relegated due to merger with Vëllazërimi.) (R)	29	16	4	9	55	33	+22	52	Relegation to Macedonian Third League
6	Shkupi	29	16	4	9	56	31	+25	52	
7	Miravci (O)	29	14	8	7	50	30	+20	50	Qualification for the Relegation play-off
8	Zajazi (R)	29	14	3	12	43	39	+4	45	Qualification for the Relegation play-off
9	Pobeda Junior (R)	29	12	7	10	44	31	+13	43	Qualification for the Relegation play-off
10	Tiverija (R)	29	12	5	12	35	43	−8	41	Relegation to Macedonian Third League
11	Madjari Solidarnost (R)	29	10	4	15	29	50	−21	34	Relegation to Macedonian Third League
12	Novaci 2005 (R)	29	8	0	21	29	60	−31	24	Relegation to Macedonian Third League
13	Lokomotiva (R)	29	5	5	19	25	60	−35	20	Relegation to Macedonian Third League
14	11 Oktomvri (R)	29	5	4	20	27	62	−35	19	Relegation to Macedonian Third League
15	Borec (R)	29	4	2	23	29	80	−51	14	Relegation to Macedonian Third League
16	Rufeja (Note: Rufeja were deducted 12 points.) (R)	15	4	2	9	11	26	−15	2	Relegation to Macedonian Third League

Source: MacedonianFootball.com, Soccerway
Rules for classification: 1) Points; 2) Head-to-head points; 3) Head-to-head goal difference; 4) Head-to-head away goals scored
(C) Champions; (O) Play-off winners; (P) Promoted; (R) Relegated

== Results ==
Every team will play each other team twice (home and away) for a total of 30 matches each.

Home \ Away	OKT	BOR	DRI	LOK	MAS	MIR	NOV	POB	RUF	SHK	SIL	SKO	TET	TIV	VRA	ZAJ
11 Oktomvri	—	1–0	0–2	1–0	2–2	0–2	1–0	0–1	—	1–2	0–0	1–3	2–2	2–1	2–5	1–3
Borec	1–1	—	1–2	0–3	0–1	0–1	4–1	0–1	0–2	1–4	1–3	3–2	0–5	2–3	0–6	2–0
Drita	4–1	3–0	—	4–1	3–2	1–1	1–0	2–1	—	3–0	1–0	3–0	0–0	3–3	1–0	1–0
Lokomotiva	2–4	0–6	1–1	—	3–1	0–0	2–1	1–1	—	1–3	1–2	0–3	0–2	0–1	2–1	1–0
Madjari Solidarnost	3–1	2–1	1–1	0–0	—	0–3	1–0	0–0	1–0	0–0	0–3	1–3	0–1	1–0	3–1	1–2
Miravci	1–0	0–0	1–1	3–0	4–0	—	8–3	2–0	—	3–1	0–4	1–2	1–1	3–0	1–1	3–1
Novaci	3–2	2–1	2–3	3–2	1–2	1–2	—	1–0	1–0	3–0	0–2	1–0	1–0	0–2	0–1	0–2
Pobeda Junior	2–1	12–1	1–2	3–1	1–0	0–2	2–0	—	1–0	1–1	1–1	0–0	3–2	4–1	2–1	3–0
Rufeja	2–0	—	1–1	1–1	—	0–3	—	—	—	—	—	1–0	—	1–5	—	2–1
Shkupi	4–1	2–1	3–0	3–0	1–0	3–1	3–0	2–2	3–0	—	4–1	3–0	1–0	3–0	1–2	4–2
Sileks	4–0	8–1	1–0	2–1	4–0	0–0	2–0	2–0	2–0	2–1	—	3–1	2–0	3–0	3–1	5–1
Skopje	2–1	3–1	1–0	2–0	4–1	3–0	3–1	0–0	—	1–0	5–4	—	0–0	3–0	3–1	3–1
Teteks	3–0	4–0	2–1	3–1	5–1	1–0	1–0	3–1	3–0	1–1	1–0	3–0	—	3–0	2–1	1–1
Tiverija	2–1	2–1	1–0	2–0	2–3	2–2	2–0	1–0	—	1–0	0–1	1–1	0–2	—	1–1	2–0
Vrapchishte	3–0	2–1	0–1	3–0	3–1	3–2	4–2	1–0	4–1	1–0	1–1	0–0	3–1	3–0	—	1–0
Zajazi	3–0	4–0	0–0	4–1	1–0	2–0	5–2	2–1	—	2–1	3–1	1–0	0–2	0–0	2–1	—

Source: MacedonianFootball.com
Legend: Blue = home team win; Yellow = draw; Red = away team win.

== Relegation playoff ==
=== First round ===
The first Round included 8 clubs (3 from the Second League as well as the 5 winners of the Third Leagues) which were arranged in 4 pairs, playing one game on neutral field with the winners advancing to the second round. The games will be played on 31 May 2014.

31 May 2014
16:00 CEST

Miravci	2–0	Goblen
Mizhorov 36'; Kostovski 69'

Stadion Nikola Mantov, Kochani
31 May 2014
16:00 CEST

Zajazi	1–2 (a.e.t.)	Mladost Carev Dvor
Tefe 45'		Veljanovski 4'; Daraliovski 105'

Stadion Goce Delchev, Prilep
Referee: Aleksandar Stavrev (Skopje)
31 May 2014
16:00 CEST

Pobeda Junior	3–0 (a.e.t.)	Vëllazërimi
Gesoski 103', 108'; Aceski 117'

Gradski stadion, Shtip
31 May 2014
16:00 CEST

Vardar Negotino	2–1	Belasica
Spasov 78'; Tripunov 81'		Gligorov 90+3'

Stadion Gjorche Petrov, Skopje

=== Second round ===
The Second Round included 4 clubs, the four winners of the matches in the first round: Miravci, Mladost Carev Dvor, Pobeda Junior and Vardar Negotino. In this round they were playing two games, both on neutral field with the winners getting a spot in the 2014–15 Macedonian Second League. The games will be played on 4 and 8 June 2014.

==== First leg ====
4 June 2014
17:00 CEST

Miravci	1–0	Vardar Negotino
Donev

Gradski stadion, Shtip
4 June 2014
17:00 CEST

Pobeda Junior	1–3	Mladost Carev Dvor
Karcheski 15'		Klechkaroski 45', 56', 89'

SRC Biljanini Izvori, Ohrid

==== Second leg ====
8 June 2014
16:00 CEST

Vardar Negotino	0–5	Miravci

Gradski stadion, Shtip

Miravci won 6–0 on aggregate

8 June 2014
16:00 CEST

Mladost Carev Dvor	1–2	Pobeda Junior
Klechkaroski 20'		Gesoski 15'; Aceski 84'

SRC Biljanini Izvori, Ohrid

Mladost Carev Dvor won 4–3 on aggregate

== See also ==
- 2013–14 Macedonian Football Cup
- 2013–14 Macedonian First Football League
- 2013–14 Macedonian Third Football League
