= 2012–13 Macedonian Second Football League =

Macedonian Second League
- Season: 2012–13
- Champions: Makedonija G.P.
- Promoted: Makedonija G.P. Gostivar
- Relegated: Babi; Tikvesh; Ohrid

The 2012–13 Macedonian Second Football League was the 21st season since its establishment. It began on 11 August 2012 and ended on 28 May 2013.

== Participating teams ==
Location of teams in 2012–13 Macedonian Second League

Club	City	Stadium	Capacity
11 Oktomvri	Prilep	Stadion Goce Delchev	15,000
Babi	Shtip	Gradski stadion Shtip	4,000
Euromilk Gorno Lisiche	Skopje	Stadion Gorno Lisiche	1,500
Gostivar	Gostivar	Gradski stadion Gostivar	1,000
Korzo	Prilep	Stadion Goce Delchev	15,000
Lokomotiva	Skopje	Komunalec Stadium	1,000
Madzhari Solidarnost	Skopje	Boris Trajkovski Stadium	3,000
Makedonija G.P.	Skopje	Stadion Gjorche Petrov	3,000
Miravci	Miravci	Stadion Miravci	1,000
Novaci 2005	Novaci	Stadion Novaci	500
Ohrid	Ohrid	SRC Biljanini Izvori	3,000
Pobeda Junior	Prilep	Stadion Goce Delchev	15,000
Rufeja	Miletino, Brvenica	Stadion Miletino	500
Skopje	Skopje	Stadion Avtokomanda	4,000
Tikvesh	Kavadarci	Gradski Stadion Kavadarci	7,500
Vrapchishte	Vrapchishte	Vrapchishte Stadium	500

== League table ==
Pos	Team	Pld	W	D	L	GF	GA	GD	Pts	Promotion or relegation
1	Makedonija G.P. (C, P)	30	21	4	5	60	21	+39	67	Promotion to Macedonian First League
2	Gostivar (P)	30	19	8	3	55	17	+38	65	Promotion to Macedonian First League
3	Skopje	30	19	6	5	59	18	+41	63	Qualification to Promotion play-off
4	Euromilk Gorno Lisiche (Note: Euromilk Gorno Lisiche were deducted three points.) (P)	30	19	7	4	47	16	+31	61	Qualification to Promotion play-off
5	Rufeja	30	16	8	6	46	19	+27	56	
6	Miravci	30	16	5	9	50	29	+21	53	
7	Pobeda Junior	30	12	3	15	34	44	−10	39	
8	Vrapchishte	30	9	10	11	39	41	−2	37	
9	Korzo	30	8	11	11	42	42	0	35	
10	Madjari Solidarnost	30	9	7	14	39	44	−5	34 (Note: Head-to-head record: Madjari Solidarnost 3 pts, Novaci 3 pts. Goal difference: +2 for Madjari Solidarnost.)	
11	Novaci	30	10	4	16	40	57	−17	34	
12	Lokomotiva	30	10	3	17	41	52	−11	33 (Note: Head-to-head record: Lokomotiva 3 pts, 11 Oktomvri 3 pts. Goal difference: +5 for Lokomotiva.)	
13	11 Oktomvri	30	10	3	17	40	55	−15	33	
14	Babi (R)	30	9	3	18	34	44	−10	30	Qualification to Relegation play-off
15	Tikvesh (R)	30	4	7	19	24	76	−52	19	Relegation to Macedonian Third League
16	Ohrid (Note: Ohrid were deducted six points.) (R)	30	4	1	25	25	100	−75	7	Relegation to Macedonian Third League

Source: MacedonianFootball.com, Soccerway
Rules for classification: 1) Points; 2) Head-to-head points; 3) Head-to-head goal difference; 4) Head-to-head away goals scored
(C) Champions; (P) Promoted; (R) Relegated

== Results ==
Every team will play each other team twice (home and away) for a total of 30 matches each.

Home \ Away	OKT	BAB	EGL	GOS	KOR	LOK	MAS	MGP	MIR	NOV	OHR	POB	RUF	SKO	TIK	VRA
11 Oktomvri	—	2–1	0–1	1–3	2–2	1–0	2–1	0–2	0–1	1–1	4–2	1–0	1–3	0–1	5–0	2–0
Babi	5–1	—	0–1	0–2	1–1	4–1	1–1	0–1	0–2	3–1	3–0	3–0	1–0	0–3	1–0	2–1
Euromilk Gorno Lisiche	3–1	3–0	—	2–1	3–1	2–0	0–0	2–1	2–1	3–1	3–0	2–0	0–0	0–0	0–0	1–0
Gostivar	1–0	2–0	1–1	—	2–0	2–0	0–0	0–0	1–1	3–0	1–0	5–1	1–0	2–0	0–0	5–0
Korzo	3–2	2–0	0–1	2–2	—	2–1	1–0	0–2	0–1	2–1	6–1	2–1	1–1	1–1	0–0	0–0
Lokomotiva	7–1	2–0	1–1	0–1	2–1	—	1–0	0–4	0–2	3–0	3–0	4–1	0–3	1–3	1–4	2–2
Madjari Solidarnost	3–0	2–4	0–4	0–2	2–2	0–2	—	1–0	1–0	3–0	5–2	1–0	1–1	1–1	6–0	0–0
Makedonija	0–1	2–0	2–1	1–0	1–1	2–0	4–2	—	2–0	3–1	3–1	2–0	1–0	3–2	3–0	3–1
Miravci	5–1	3–0	2–0	1–3	1–1	4–1	5–1	0–0	—	3–2	2–1	0–2	1–0	3–1	3–1	2–0
Novaci	2–1	1–0	0–1	2–5	2–0	2–2	2–1	0–0	2–0	—	3–0	2–1	0–1	0–3	4–0	2–2
Ohrid	2–5	4–3	0–1	0–2	1–0	2–1	0–3	2–10	0–3	1–4	—	1–2	1–3	0–4	0–0	2–1
Pobeda Junior	2–1	2–1	1–0	0–2	3–0	1–0	0–1	2–4	1–0	3–1	2–1	—	0–2	1–1	1–0	1–1
Rufeja	0–0	1–0	2–1	0–0	3–1	2–0	4–2	0–2	1–1	4–1	3–0	3–0	—	1–0	5–0	0–1
Skopje	2–0	2–1	1–1	4–0	3–1	1–0	2–0	2–0	1–0	7–0	5–0	1–0	1–1	—	3–0	2–0
Tikvesh	0–3	0–0	0–4	0–5	0–7	1–2	2–1	1–2	3–2	0–3	9–1	0–4	1–1	0–2	—	1–6
Vrapchishte	2–1	1–0	0–3	1–1	2–2	3–4	2–0	1–0	1–1	1–0	6–0	2–2	0–1	1–0	1–1	—

Source: MacedonianFootball.com, Soccerway
Legend: Blue = home team win; Yellow = draw; Red = away team win.

== Promotion playoff ==
12 June 2013
16:30 CEST

Drita	0–3 (Awarded)	Gorno Lisiche
Barać 53'; Nuhiji 65'	Report	Pandovski 11', 45'; Mickov 54'

Gradski stadion, Shtip
Attendance: 1,500
Referee: Dalibor Gjorgjevski (Kumanovo)

12 June 2013
16:30 CEST

Pelister	1–0	Skopje
Dimitrovski 68'	Report

Gradski stadion, Kichevo
Attendance: 3,000
Referee: Josip Barton (Tetovo)

== Relegation playoff ==
15 June 2013
16:30 CEST

Babi	0–1	Zajazi
		Dani 70'

Stadion Gjorche Petrov, Skopje

15 June 2013
16:30 CEST

Tiverija	1–0	Shkupi
Gucev 75' (pen.)

Gradski stadion, Shtip

15 June 2013
16:30 CEST

Borec	3–0	Korabi
Todorovski; Chokov; Levkov

Stadion Tumbe Kafe, Bitola

== See also ==
- 2012–13 Macedonian Football Cup
- 2012–13 Macedonian First Football League
- 2012–13 Macedonian Third Football League
