= 2013–14 Macedonian Football Cup =

Tournament details
- Country: Macedonia
- Dates: 21 August 2013 – 7 May 2014
- Teams: 32

Final positions
- Champions: Rabotnichki (3rd title)
- Runners-up: Metalurg

Tournament statistics
- Matches played: 42
- Goals scored: 122 (2.9 per match)

The 2013–14 Macedonian Football Cup was the 22nd season of Macedonia's football knockout competition. Teteks are the defending champions, having won their first title. The 2013–14 champions were FK Rabotnichki who won their third title.

== Competition calendar ==
Round	Date(s)	Fixtures	Clubs	New entries
First Round	21, 22 August 2013	16	32 → 16	32
Second Round	18, 25 September 2013	16	16 → 8	none
Quarter-finals	12, 13 October & 20 November 2013	8	8 → 4	none
Semi-finals	19 March & 16 April 2014	4	4 → 2	none
Final	7 May 2014	1	2 → 1	none

== First round ==
Matches were played on 21 and 22 August 2013.

Team 1	Score	Team 2
21 August 2013
Zajazi (2)	2–4	Vardar (1)
Lokomotiva (2)	1–5	Napredok (1)
Babi (3)	0–3 (w/o)	Gostivar (1)
Karaorman (3)	0–5	Pelister (1)
Belasica (3)	0–4	Horizont Turnovo (1)
11 Oktomvri (2)	0–4	Renova (1)
Mogila (3)	2–3	Sileks (2)
Novaci 2005 (2)	2–1	Gorno Lisiche (1)
Shkupi (x)	0–3 (w/o)	Teteks (2)
Korzo (2)	0–1	Metalurg (1)
Miravci (2)	3–0	Rufeja (2)
Borec (2)	1–2	Drita (2)
Ljuboten (3)	0–3	Makedonija G.P. (1)
22 August 2013
Rabotnik Dzhumajlija (3)	0–7	Shkëndija (1)
Sateska (4)	0–3 (w/o)	Bregalnica Shtip (1)
Karbinci (3)	1–9	Rabotnichki (1)

== Second round ==
Entering this round are the 16 winners from the first round. The first legs took place on 18 September and the second legs took place on 25 September 2013.

Team 1	Agg.	Team 2	1st leg	2nd leg
Metalurg (1)	(a) 2–2	Vardar (1)	1–0	1–2
Horizont Turnovo (1)	1–1 (0–3 p)	Bregalnica Shtip (1)	1–0	0–1
Teteks (2)	4–4 (5–4 p)	Renova (1)	2–2	2–2
Pelister (1)	2–2 (3–2 p)	Miravci (2)	2–0	0–2
Rabotnichki (1)	6–1	Novaci 2005 (2)	4–0	2–1
Sileks (2)	1–1 (7–8 p)	Drita (2)	1–0	0–1
Gostivar (1)	2–4	Napredok (1)	0–3	2–1
Shkëndija (1)	4–0	Makedonija G.P. (1)	2–0	2–0

== Quarter-finals ==
Entering this round are the 8 winners from the second round. The first legs took place on 12 and 13 October and the second legs took place on 20 November and 4 December 2013.

=== Summary ===
Team 1	Agg.	Team 2	1st leg	2nd leg
Teteks (2)	2–1	Napredok (1)	0–0	2–1
Bregalnica Shtip (1)	3–2	Shkëndija (1)	2–1	1–1
Drita (2)	1–10	Metalurg (1)	0–3	1–7
Pelister (1)	1–2	Rabotnichki (1)	1–0	0–2

=== Matches ===
13 October 2013
14:00 CEST

Teteks (2)	0–0	Napredok (1)

Stadion Gjorche Petrov, Skopje
Referee: Stojanche Stojanov (Shtip)
20 November 2013
13:00 CET

Napredok (1)	1–2	Teteks (2)
Kralevski 89' (o.g.)		Petkovski 11' (pen.); Bozhinovski 69'

Gradski stadion, Kichevo
Referee: Konstantin Vlaho (Ohrid)

Teteks won 2–1 on aggregate.

12 October 2013
14:00 CEST

Bregalnica Shtip (1)	2–1	Shkëndija (1)
Zdravkov 19' (pen.); Velkovski 21'		Mustafi 3'

Gradski stadion, Shtip
Referee: Dalibor Gjorgjevski (Kumanovo)
20 November 2013
13:00 CET

Shkëndija (1)	1–1	Bregalnica Shtip (1)
Pollozhani 33'		Zdravkov 7'

Gradski stadion, Tetovo
Referee: Aleksandar Stavrev (Skopje)

Bregalnica Shtip won 3–2 on aggregate.

13 October 2013
14:00 CEST

Drita (2)	0–3	Metalurg (1)
		Krstev 3'; Simonovski 16' (pen.), 35'

Stadion Bogovinje, Bogovinje
Referee: Josip Barton (Tetovo)
20 November 2013
13:00 CET

Metalurg (1)	7–1	Drita (2)
Simonovski 33', 48', 78'; Naumovski 52'; Vujović 60'; Ristovski 76'; Shaipi 87' (o.g.)		Aliu 56' (pen.)

Stadion Zhelezarnica, Skopje
Referee: Stevche Shulevski (Ohrid)

Metalurg won 7–1 on aggregate.

13 October 2013
14:00 CEST

Pelister (1)	1–0	Rabotnichki (1)
Altiparmakovski 22'

Stadion Tumbe Kafe, Bitola
Referee: Goran Spirkoski (Prilep)
20 November 2013
13:00 CET

Rabotnichki (1)	2–0	Pelister (1)
Imeri 77'; Velkoski 86'

Stadion Gjorche Petrov, Skopje
Referee: Goran Spirkoski (Prilep)

Rabotnichki won 2–1 on aggregate.

== Semi-finals ==
Entering this round are the 4 winners from the quarter-finals. The first legs were played on 19 March and the second legs were played on 16 April 2014.

=== Summary ===
Team 1	Agg.	Team 2	1st leg	2nd leg
Rabotnichki (1)	2–2 (5–4 p)	Bregalnica Shtip (1)	2–0	0–2
Teteks (2)	0–1	Metalurg (1)	0–0	0–1

=== Matches ===
19 March 2014
14:00 CET

Rabotnichki (1)	2−0	Bregalnica Shtip (1)
Petrovikj 1'; Seferi 72'

Philip II Arena, Skopje
Attendance: 200
Referee: Goran Spirkoski (Prilep)
16 April 2014
16:00 CEST

Bregalnica Shtip (1)	2–0	Rabotnichki (1)
Aksentiev 27'; Mitrov 83'
Penalties
Zdravkov (penalty missed); Markoski (penalty missed); Blazheski (penalty missed); Mitrov (penalty scored); Aksentiev (penalty scored); Stupić (penalty scored); Shishkov (penalty scored); S. Velkovski (penalty missed)	4–5	(penalty scored) Milushev; (penalty missed) Ilievski; (penalty missed) Ilijoski; (penalty scored) Manevski; (penalty missed) Todorovski; (penalty scored) D. Velkovski; (penalty scored) Seferi; (penalty scored) Petrovikj

Gradski stadion, Shtip
Attendance: 1,000
Referee: Goran Spirkoski (Prilep)

3–3 on aggregate. Rabotnichki won 5–4 in penalty shootout.

19 March 2014
14:00 CET

Teteks (2)	0−0	Metalurg (1)

Stadion Gjorche Petrov, Skopje
Attendance: 200
Referee: Marjan Markoski (Ohrid)
16 April 2014
16:00 CEST

Metalurg (1)	1−0	Teteks (2)
Simonovski 80'

Philip II Arena, Skopje
Attendance: 250
Referee: Stevche Shuleski (Ohrid)

Metalurg won 1–0 on aggregate.

== Final ==
7 May 2014
20:00 CEST

Rabotnichki (1)	2−0	Metalurg (1)
Manevski 45+3' (pen.); Petrov 90+2'	Report

Philip II Arena, Skopje
Attendance: 1,500
Referee: Dimitar Mechkarovski (Skopje)

== Season statistics ==
=== Top scorers ===
As of 7 May 2014

Rank	Player	Club	Goals
1	(North Macedonia) Krste Velkoski	Rabotnichki	6
1	(North Macedonia) Marko Simonovski	Metalurg Skopje	6
3	(North Macedonia) Borche Manevski	Pelister	5
4	(North Macedonia) Filip Petkovski	Teteks	4
9	(North Macedonia) Izair Emini	Renova	3
9	(Serbia) Edin Ademović	Vardar	3
9	(North Macedonia) Marjan Altiparmakovski	Pelister	3
9	(Serbia) Zoran Vujović	Metalurg Skopje	3
9	(North Macedonia) Saško Pandev	Horizont Turnovo	3

== See also ==
- 2013–14 Macedonian First Football League
- 2013–14 Macedonian Second Football League
- 2013–14 Macedonian Third Football League
