= 2012–13 Macedonian Football Cup =

Tournament details
- Country: Macedonia
- Dates: 22 August 2012 – 22 May 2013
- Teams: 32

Final positions
- Champions: Teteks (2nd title)
- Runners-up: Shkëndija

Tournament statistics
- Matches played: 43
- Goals scored: 117 (2.72 per match)

The 2012–13 Macedonian Football Cup was the 21st season of Macedonia's football knockout competition. Renova are the defending champions, having won their first title. The 2012–13 champions were FK Teteks who won their second title.

== Competition calendar ==
Round	Date(s)	Fixtures	Clubs	New entries
First Round	22 August 2012	16	32 → 16	32
Second Round	9, 19, 26, 27 September 2012	16	16 → 8	none
Quarter-finals	14 October & 7, 21 November 2012	8	8 → 4	none
Semi-finals	17 April & 2 May 2013	4	4 → 2	none
Final	22 May 2013	1	2 → 1	none

== First round ==
Matches were played on 21 and 22 August 2012.

Team 1	Score	Team 2
21 August 2012
Astibo (3)	0–3 (w/o)	11 Oktomvri (2)
22 August 2012
Karaorman (3)	1–2	Metalurg (1)
Madjari Solidarnost (2)	0–1	Drita (1)
Poeshevo (3)	1–2	Renova (1)
Babi (2)	1–0	Napredok (1)
Gostivar (2)	0–0 (1–3 p)	Bregalnica Shtip (1)
Rufeja (2)	0–2	Vardar (1)
Plachkovica (3)	0–3 (w/o)	Shkëndija (1)
Belasica (3)	1–3	Sileks (1)
Bashkimi (3)	2–2 (5–4 p)	Tikvesh (2)
Babuna (3)	0–4	Horizont Turnovo (1)
Ljuboten (3)	0–5	Gorno Lisiche (2)
Ohrid 2004 (2)	2–7	Teteks (1)
Slavej (4)	0–6	Pelister (1)
Pobeda Junior (2)	0–0 (5–3 p)	Rabotnichki (1)
Lokomotiva (2)	2–2 (4–2 p)	Miravci (2)

== Second round ==
Entering this round are the 16 winners from the First Round. The first legs took place on 9 and 19 September 2012 and the second legs took place on 26 and 27 September 2012.

Team 1	Agg.	Team 2	1st leg	2nd leg
Metalurg (1)	4–3	Horizont Turnovo (1)	3–3	1–0
Lokomotiva (2)	0–9	Teteks (1)	0–2	0–7
Bashkimi (3)	1–4	Sileks (1)	1–1	0–3
Vardar (1)	4–1	Gorno Lisiche (2)	2–0	2–1
Pelister (1)	6–1	Babi (2)	5–0	1–1
Shkëndija (1)	2–0	Bregalnica Shtip (1)	1–0	1–0
Pobeda Junior (2)	0–2	Drita (1)	0–0	0–2
11 Oktomvri (2)	0–10	Renova (1)	0–5	0–5

== Quarter-finals ==
The first legs of the quarter-finals took place on 14 October and 7 November 2012, while the second legs took place on 21 November 2012.

=== Summary ===
Team 1	Agg.	Team 2	1st leg	2nd leg
Pelister (1)	0–3	Vardar (1)	0–1	0–2
Shkëndija (1)	6–1	Metalurg (1)	1–0	5–1
Drita (1)	1–5	Sileks (1)	1–2	0–3
Teteks (1)	1–0	Renova (1)	0–0	1–0

=== Matches ===
7 November 2012
13:00 CET

Pelister (1)	0–1	Vardar (1)
		Petrov 77'

Stadion Tumbe Kafe, Bitola
Referee: Marjan Eckoski (Ohrid)
21 November 2012
18:00 CET

Vardar (1)	2–0	Pelister (1)
Petrov 66'; Giménez 85'

Philip II Arena, Skopje
Referee: Marjan Eckoski (Ohrid)

Vardar won 3–0 on aggregate.

14 October 2012
14:00 CEST

Shkëndija (1)	1–0	Metalurg (1)
Ejupi 33'

Gradski stadion, Tetovo
Referee: Goran Spirkoski (Prilep)
21 November 2012
13:00 CET

Metalurg (1)	1–5	Shkëndija (1)
Maznov 40'		Ejupi 50', 71', 79', 82'; Neziri 61'

Stadion Zhelezarnica, Skopje
Referee: Stevche Shulevski (Ohrid)

Shkëndija won 6–1 on aggregate.

14 October 2012
14:00 CEST

Drita (1)	1–2	Sileks (1)
Idrizi 29'		Sadiki 33' (o.g.); Velinov 48'

Stadion Bogovinje, Bogovinje
Referee: Marjan Eckoski (Ohrid)
21 November 2012
13:00 CET

Sileks (1)	3–0	Drita (1)
Velinov 45', 65', 72'

Stadion Sileks, Kratovo
Referee: Dalibor Gjorgjevski (Kumanovo)

Sileks won 5–1 on aggregate.

14 October 2012
14:00 CEST

Teteks (1)	0–0	Renova (1)

Stadion Gjorche Petrov, Skopje
Referee: Dalibor Gjorgjevski (Kumanovo)
21 November 2012
13:00 CET

Renova (1)	0–1	Teteks (1)
		Bozhinovski 19'

Gradski stadion, Tetovo
Referee: Goran Spirkoski (Prilep)

Teteks won 1–0 on aggregate.

== Semi-finals ==
The first legs of the semi-finals took place on 17 April 2013, while the second legs took place on 2 May 2013.

=== Summary ===
Team 1	Agg.	Team 2	1st leg	2nd leg
Shkëndija (1)	(a) 1–1	Vardar (1)	0–0	1–1
Sileks (1)	0–3	Teteks (1)	0–1	0–2

=== Matches ===
17 April 2013
16:00 CEST

Shkëndija (1)	0–0	Vardar (1)

Gradski stadion, Tetovo
Attendance: 4,500
Referee: Marjan Markoski (Ohrid)
1 May 2013
18:30 CEST

Vardar (1)	1−1	Shkëndija (1)
Petrov 90'		Rexhepi 81'

Philip II Arena, Skopje
Attendance: 2,000
Referee: Marjan Eckoski (Ohrid)

1–1 on aggregate. Shkëndija won on away goals.

17 April 2013
16:00 CEST

Sileks (1)	0–1	Teteks (1)
		Nastevski 83'

Stadion Sileks, Kratovo
Attendance: 400
Referee: Stojanche Stojanov (Shtip)
1 May 2013
16:00 CEST

Teteks (1)	2−0	Sileks (1)
Jovanovski 75'; Bozhinovski 86' (pen.)

Stadion Gjorche Petrov, Skopje
Referee: Konstantin Vlaho (Skopje)

Teteks won 3–0 on aggregate.

== Final ==
=== Original Match ===
Initial match was played on 22 May 2013, but the game was abandoned just 10 minutes after the start, because of the crowd trouble when the both ultras groups were chanting nationalistic chants.

22 May 2013
20:30 CEST

Shkëndija (1)	0–0	Teteks (1)

Philip II Arena, Skopje
Referee: Aleksandar Stavrev (Skopje)

=== Rematch ===
26 May 2013
20:00 CEST

Shkëndija (1)	1–1 (a.e.t.)	Teteks (1)
Ejupi 15'	Report	Micevski 68'
Penalties
Ejupi (penalty missed); Aliji (penalty scored); Shabani (penalty scored); Cuculi (penalty scored); Taipi (penalty scored); Useini (penalty scored); Berisha (penalty missed)	5–6	(penalty scored) Nastevski; (penalty missed) Despotovski; (penalty scored) Drobarov; (penalty scored) Petkovski; (penalty scored) Kralevski; (penalty scored) Manchevski; (penalty scored) Iseni

Philip II Arena, Skopje
Attendance: 0
Referee: Aleksandar Stavrev (Skopje)

== See also ==
- 2012–13 Macedonian First Football League
- 2012–13 Macedonian Second Football League
- 2012–13 Macedonian Third Football League
