= 2012–13 Macedonian First Football League =

Macedonian First League
- Season: 2012–13
- Dates: 11 August 2012 – 2 June 2013
- Champions: Vardar; 7th Macedonian title 8th domestic title
- Relegated: Teteks; Sileks; Drita
- Champions League: Vardar
- Europa League: Metalurg; Turnovo; Teteks
- Matches: 186
- Goals: 448 (2.41 per match)
- Top goalscorer: Jovan Kostovski (22 goals)
- Biggest home win: Vardar 6–1 Shkëndija (12 March 2013); Vardar 5–0 Sileks (9 December 2012); Vardar 5–0 Turnovo (2 June 2013)
- Biggest away win: Teteks 0–3 Renova (18 August 2012); Renova 0–3 Shkëndija (29 September 2012); Shkëndija 0–3 Bregalnica (18 November 2012); Napredok 0–3 Shkëndija (27 April 2013); Teteks 0–3 Vardar (7 May 2013)
- Highest scoring: Sileks 3–5 Rabotnichki (26 August 2012)
- Longest winning run: 5 games Metalurg
- Longest unbeaten run: 10 games Turnovo
- Longest winless run: 12 games Napredok
- Longest losing run: 6 games Napredok

The 2012–13 Macedonian First League was the 21st season of the Macedonian First Football League, the highest football league of Macedonia. Vardar were the defending champions after winning their sixth Macedonian championship at the end of the 2011–12 season. Twelve teams contested the league, comprising ten sides from the 2011–12 season and two promoted from the 2011–12 2. MFL.

== Promotion and relegation ==
At the start of the 2012–13 season

Promoted from 2011–12 Second League

- Pelister (winners)
- Drita (runners-up)

Relegated to 2012–13 Second League

- Ohrid (11th)
- 11 Oktomvri (12th)

At the end of the 2012–13 season

Promoted from 2012–13 Second League

- Makedonija G.P. (winners)
- Gostivar (runners-up)
- Gorno Lisiche (Fourth placed; won play-off match)

Relegated to 2013–14 Second League

- Drita (9th; lost play-off match)
- Teteks (11th)
- Sileks (12th)

== Participating teams ==
Location of teams in 2012–13 Macedonian First League

Club	Manager	City	Stadium	Capacity
Bregalnica	(North Macedonia) Dobrinko Ilievski	Shtip	Gradski stadion Shtip	4,000
Drita	(North Macedonia) Nexhat Husein	Bogovinje	Stadion Bogovinje	500
Metalurg Skopje	(North Macedonia) Srgjan Zaharievski	Skopje	Stadion Zhelezarnica	3,000
Napredok	(North Macedonia) Dragan Bocheski	Kichevo	Gradski stadion Kichevo	5,000
Pelister	(North Macedonia) Mile Dimov (interim)	Bitola	Stadion Tumbe Kafe	8,000
Rabotnichki	(North Macedonia) Zhikica Tasevski	Skopje	Philip II Arena	33,460
Renova	(North Macedonia) Qatip Osmani	Djepchishte	Gradski stadion Tetovo	15,000
Shkëndija	(North Macedonia) Artim Shakiri	Tetovo	Gradski stadion Tetovo	15,000
Sileks	(North Macedonia) Trajche Senev	Kratovo	Stadion Sileks	1,800
Teteks	(North Macedonia) Gorazd Mihajlov	Tetovo	Gradski stadion Tetovo	15,000
Horizont Turnovo	(North Macedonia) Ljupcho Dimitkovski	Turnovo	Stadion Kukush	1,500
Vardar	(North Macedonia) Blagoja Milevski	Skopje	Philip II Arena	33,460

== League table ==
Pos	Team	Pld	W	D	L	GF	GA	GD	Pts	Qualification or relegation
1	Vardar (C)	33	20	8	5	71	21	+50	68	Qualification for the Champions League second qualifying round
2	Metalurg	33	18	9	6	48	28	+20	63	Qualification for the Europa League first qualifying round
3	Horizont Turnovo	33	17	12	4	49	31	+18	63	Qualification for the Europa League first qualifying round
4	Rabotnichki	33	16	5	12	47	42	+5	53	
5	Shkëndija (Note: Shkëndija were deducted three points for leaving the pitch in the match against Teteks in the 19th round.)	33	13	8	12	52	49	+3	44	
6	Bregalnica Shtip	33	12	7	14	37	35	+2	43	
7	Napredok	33	12	7	14	29	39	−10	43	
8	Renova	33	12	7	14	35	46	−11	43	
9	Drita (R)	33	11	7	15	35	50	−15	40	Qualification for the relegation play-offs
10	Pelister (O)	33	9	10	14	27	36	−9	37	Qualification for the relegation play-offs
11	Teteks (R)	33	6	7	20	22	47	−25	25	Europa League qualifying and relegation to the Second League (Note: Teteks qualified for the Europa League first qualifying round by winning the 2012–13 Macedonian Football Cup.)
12	Sileks (R)	33	6	5	22	33	61	−28	23	Relegation to Macedonian Second League

Source: MacedonianFootball.com
Rules for classification: 1) Points; 2) Goal difference; 3) Goals scored; 4) Head-to-head points; 5) Head-to-head goal difference; 6) Head-to-head away goals scored (only if two teams); 7) Head-to-head goals scored; 8) Draw; 9) Play-off. (Note: Criteria 2, 3 and 8 is only used if not deciding Champion, teams for UEFA competitions or relegation).
(C) Champions; (O) Play-off winners; (R) Relegated

== Results ==
Every team played three times against each other team for a total of 33 matches. The first 22 matchdays consisted of a regular double round-robin schedule. The league standings at this point were then used to determine the games for the last 11 matchdays.

Home \ Away	BRE	DRI	MET	NAP	PEL	RAB	REN	SKE	SIL	TET	TUR	VAR	BRE	DRI	MET	NAP	PEL	RAB	REN	SKE	SIL	TET	TUR	VAR
Bregalnica Shtip	—	3–0	0–1	0–1	1–0	2–0	0–0	0–0	2–0	2–0	1–1	1–1	—	1–0	2–3	—	—	—	—	4–3	—	2–0	—	1–1
Drita	0–1	—	1–2	3–0	1–1	1–0	2–4	2–2	2–1	1–0	0–0	0–1	—	—	0–2	—	2–0	—	—	3–1	—	2–0	—	1–3
Metalurg	2–1	0–1	—	3–2	1–0	2–1	4–0	0–1	1–1	0–0	1–1	3–2	—	—	—	2–0	1–0	1–1	3–1	—	3–0	—	—	1–1
Napredok	2–1	1–1	1–1	—	1–0	0–2	2–0	3–1	1–0	2–0	0–0	1–0	2–1	1–2	—	—	—	0–2	—	0–3	—	0–0	0–2	—
Pelister	1–0	1–1	0–1	2–0	—	1–0	3–1	1–1	2–1	2–1	1–1	0–0	0–0	—	—	1–2	—	—	1–0	—	2–4	—	1–1	—
Rabotnichki	3–1	2–2	2–0	0–1	2–1	—	3–0	1–1	1–0	1–0	2–0	0–2	1–1	2–0	—	—	1–0	—	—	—	3–2	3–1	—	—
Renova	2–0	2–0	1–0	1–1	0–0	3–1	—	0–3	2–0	1–0	0–0	0–2	2–1	1–1	—	2–1	—	0–2	—	—	—	3–1	0–2	—
Shkëndija	0–3	2–1	1–0	2–2	3–1	5–1	1–2	—	1–0	4–1	1–2	2–1	—	—	1–1	—	0–1	1–0	1–1	—	3–0	—	—	0–1
Sileks	2–1	4–0	0–2	0–2	2–0	3–5	1–0	2–3	—	2–1	1–1	0–0	0–1	1–2	—	0–0	—	—	2–2	—	—	—	1–2	—
Teteks	0–2	1–2	0–1	0–1	2–0	1–1	0–3	3–0	2–1	—	0–1	0–0	—	—	1–1	—	0–0	—	—	2–1	4–0	—	—	0–3
Horizont Turnovo	2–0	2–1	2–0	1–0	2–2	3–0	2–0	3–2	3–1	0–0	—	0–0	2–1	4–0	2–4	—	—	3–0	—	1–1	—	2–0	—	—
Vardar	3–0	4–0	1–1	1–0	3–1	3–2	3–0	6–1	5–0	4–0	5–1	—	—	—	—	4–0	0–1	1–2	3–1	—	2–1	—	5–0	—

Source: MacedonianFootball.com
Legend: Blue = home team win; Yellow = draw; Red = away team win.

== Relegation play-offs ==
12 June 2013
16:30 CEST

Drita	0–3 (Awarded)	Gorno Lisiche
Barać 53'; Nuhiji 65'	Report	Pandovski 11', 45'; Mickov 54'

Gradski stadion, Shtip
Attendance: 1,500
Referee: Dalibor Gjorgjevski (Kumanovo)

12 June 2013
16:30 CEST

Pelister	1–0	Skopje
Dimitrovski 68'	Report

Gradski stadion, Kichevo
Attendance: 3,000
Referee: Josip Barton (Tetovo)

== Season statistics ==
=== Top scorers ===
As of 2 June 2013

Rank	Player	Club	Goals
1	(North Macedonia) Jovan Kostovski	Vardar	22
2	(North Macedonia) Muzafer Ejupi	Shkëndija	20
3	(North Macedonia) Dejan Blazhevski	Turnovo	18
4	(North Macedonia) Zoran Baldovaliev	Turnovo	16
5	(North Macedonia) Nikola Georgiev	Sileks	13
5	(North Macedonia) Mile Krstev	Metalurg	13
5	(North Macedonia) Krste Velkoski	Rabotnichki	13
8	(North Macedonia) Izair Emini	Shkëndija and Renova	10
8	(North Macedonia) Marko Simonovski	Napredok and Metalurg	10
10	(North Macedonia) Ardijan Nuhiji	Drita	9

- Players whose names are written with Italic letters played only during the first half of the season.

== See also ==
- 2012–13 Macedonian Football Cup
- 2012–13 Macedonian Second Football League
- 2012–13 Macedonian Third Football League
