= Xhengis Rexhepi =

Macedonian coach and former footballer

Personal information
- Date of birth: 8 July 1982 (age 44)
- Place of birth: Tetovo, SFR Yugoslavia

Youth career
- Teteks

Senior career*
Years	Team	Apps	(Gls)
–2002	Teteks		
2002–2003	Shkëndija		
2003–2004	Renova		
2004–2005	Erdekspor		
2005–2006	Karacabeyspor		
2006–2007	Bandırmaspor		
2007–2008	Burgazspor		
2008–2009	Burhaniye		
2009–2010	Zonguldak Kömürspor		
2010–2011	Teteks	2	(0)

Managerial career
- 2012: Rrufeja
- 2013–2014: Vrapçisht
- 2014: Drita Bogovinë
- 2015: Kozhuf
- 2015–2017: Vëllazërimi 77
- 2017–2021: North Macedonia (assistant)
- 2018: Sivasspor (assistant)
- 2018–2019: Llapi
- 2019: Dukagjini
- 2022: Besa Dobërdoll
- 2022–2023: Liria Prizren
- 2023: Feronikeli
- 2024: Trepça '89
- 2025–: Vëllaznimi
- * Club domestic league appearances and goals

Xhengis Rexhepi (born 8 July 1982) is a Macedonian coach for Vëllaznimi and former footballer.

== Coaching career ==
=== Llapi ===
On 19 December 2019, Rexhepi signed for Llapi of the Football Superleague of Kosovo.

=== Trepça '89 ===
In July 2024, Rexhepi signed for Trepça '89 of the First Football League of Kosovo.

=== Vëllaznimi ===
In 2025, Vëllaznimi announced that Rexhepi would be the head coach.
