= Taulant Seferi =

Albanian footballer (born 1996)

Personal information
- Birth name: Tauljant Sulejmanov
- Date of birth: 15 November 1996 (age 30)
- Place of birth: Kumanovo, Macedonia
- Height: 1.77 m (5 ft 10 in)
- Positions: Left winger; forward

Team information
- Current team: Kayserispor
- Number: 97

Youth career
- 2002–2011: Milano Kumanovë
- 2011–2013: Rabotnicki

Senior career*
Years	Team	Apps	(Gls)
2012–2014	Rabotnicki	31	(6)
2015–2016	Young Boys II	14	(6)
2015–2021	Young Boys	8	(0)
2018	→ Wohlen (loan)	8	(3)
2018–2019	→ Winterthur (loan)	31	(10)
2019–2020	→ Neuchâtel Xamax (loan)	29	(1)
2021	→ Tirana (loan)	23	(7)
2021–2022	Tirana	36	(19)
2022–2024	Vorskla Poltava	28	(13)
2023–2024	→ Baniyas (loan)	25	(11)
2024–2026	Bodrum	70	(20)
2026–	Kayserispor	15	(11)

International career^{‡}
2009	Macedonia U15	9	(7)
2011–2012	Macedonia U17	3	(2)
2012–2013	Macedonia U18	5	(3)
2013	Macedonia U19	10	(4)
2014–2016	Macedonia U21	2	(1)
2014	Macedonia	2	(0)
2017–2018	Albania U21	12	(0)
2019–	Albania	28	(3)
- * Club domestic league appearances and goals as of 21 November 2026 ‡ National team caps and goals as of 26 September 2026

Taulant Seferi (Albanian pronunciation: [ta.uˈlant sɛˈfɛɾi]; formerly known as Tauljant Sulejmanov (Macedonian: Таулјант Сулејманов); born 15 November 1996) is a professional footballer who plays as a Left winger for TFF 1. Lig club Kayserispor and the Albania national team.

Seferi began his youth career at hometown club Milano Kumanovë before joining Rabotnicki, where he made his professional debut at the age of 16 and won the domestic league and cup in the 2013–14 season. In 2015, he moved abroad to Switzerland to join Young Boys, where he made his senior debut and gained experience through several loan spells within the country. He later joined Tirana in 2021, initially on loan, and after signing permanently, briefly featured in European competitions on loan at Teuta before establishing himself as a key player at Tirana and winning the Kategoria Superiore title in the 2021–22 season. Following his success in Albania, he continued his career abroad, notably playing in Ukraine with Vorskla Poltava and later in Turkey with Bodrum.

Born in Macedonia, he represented that country at youth and senior levels before switching allegiance to Albania in 2017, where he initially featured for the under-21 side before establishing himself with the senior team, taking part in the UEFA Euro 2024 finals.

== Club career ==
=== Early career and Rabotnički ===
Seferi began his youth career in 2002 at his hometown club Milano Kumanovë and stayed there until 2011, when he transferred to Rabotnicki. In the 2013–14 season, he was promoted to the first team and made his debut on 5 October 2013 against Bregalnica Štip at the age of 16 years, 10 months, and 20 days, coming on as a substitute in the 90+1st minute for Krste Velkoski. He scored his first goal on 23 November 2013 against Shkëndija, coming on as a substitute in the 61st minute for Demir Imeri and scoring in the 81st minute in a 5–0 victory. He finished his first season with 16 appearances and three goals, as Rabotnicki won both the league and cup. He made 12 appearances in the first half of the 2014–15 Macedonian First Football League before moving abroad to join Young Boys in Switzerland.

=== Young Boys ===
In January 2015, Seferi joined Young Boys, marking his first move abroad. He initially made one appearance for the under-21 team in the 1. Liga Classic. He debuted for the first team on 14 February 2015 against Grasshoppers, coming on as a substitute in the 78th minute for Renato Steffen. Five days later, he made his UEFA competition debut in the 2014–15 UEFA Europa League Round of 32 match against Everton, again appearing as a substitute for Steffen in the 79th minute. He became a regular member of the first team under coach Uli Forte, featuring in all matches until March 2015, when he suffered a serious knee injury that required surgery and sidelined him for around 18 months. He returned to action in October 2016 with the under-21 team, before making his first-team return on 5 February 2017 against Sion as an 88th-minute substitute for Thorsten Schick.

He spent the second half of the 2017–18 season on loan at Wohlen and on 16 July 2018, he was loaned to Winterthur for the 2018–19 season.

On 10 July 2019, Seferi was loaned to Neuchâtel Xamax for the remainder of the season.

=== Tirana ===
Seferi joined Albanian club and reigning Kategoria Superiore champions Tirana on 4 January 2021 on loan for the remainder of the 2020–21 season. He made his debut for the club on 16 January 2021, in matchday 14 of the 2020–21 Kategoria Superiore, against Kastrioti, coming on as a substitute in the 53rd minute in a 2–1 home win. Seferi established himself as a regular starter for the remainder of the 2020–21 season, featuring consistently in the starting lineup, being nearly ever-present, recording full-match appearances in the majority of fixtures, and scoring seven goals, contributing directly to several match results during the campaign. He scored his first goal on 31 January 2021, on matchday 17 against Apolonia, netting the winner in the 77th minute with a right-footed shot following an Ernest Muçi assist. He followed up with another goal on 6 February 2021 in a 2–0 win over Skënderbeu. On 7 March 2021 Seferi scored from a penalty on matchday 23, as Tirana defeated Kastrioti 2–1 away. On 17 April 2021, Seferi scored against Kukësi with a header in the 71st minute to equalize 1–1, and the match ended in a 2–2 draw. On 21 May 2021, during the penultimate matchday, Seferi scored a penalty as Tirana drew 1–1 away against Apolonia Fier. On 26 May 2021, in the final matchday of the championship, Seferi scored two goals as Tirana defeated Skënderbeu 3–1, but despite the win, Tirana finished fifth, missing out on European qualification by three points.

After signing permanently with the club on a three-year contract, Seferi was immediately loaned to reigning champions Teuta for their UEFA Champions League qualification matches. Seferi made his European debut for Teuta in the first qualifying round on 7 July 2021, playing 85 minutes in the 0–4 home loss to Sheriff Tiraspol and the full 90 minutes in the second leg on 13 July 2021, which ended in a 0–1 away defeat, with Teuta eliminated 0–5 on aggregate. He also featured in the 2021–22 UEFA Europa Conference League qualifying, starting in all four matches as Teuta advanced past Inter d’Escaldes 3–2 on aggregate after a 3–0 extra-time win in the second leg, before being eliminated in the third qualifying round by Shamrock Rovers with a 0–3 aggregate defeat.

Seferi was one of the main players for Tirana as they won the 26th Kategoria Superiore title in the 2021–22 season. During the season, he formed a partnership with Redon Xhixha, with the duo having either scored or assisted 49 of Tirana's 64 league goals. Individually, Seferi scored 19 goals in 35 appearances and finished level with Laçi's Saliou Guindo for the league's Golden Boot award, but missed out due to a lower goal ratio. During the 2021–22 season, Seferi received widespread recognition for his performances in the Kategoria Superiore, with commentators praising his physical strength, dribbling ability, and overall impact on matches; following his goal against Skënderbeu on 11 April 2022, the club's media highlighted his skill with the phrase "Dribble like Jerry and shoot like Tomi," reflecting his standout attacking qualities.

=== Vorskla Poltava ===
On 22 August 2022, Seferi was transferred to Vorskla Poltava in the Ukrainian Premier League, signing a three-year contract for a reported €500,000 transfer fee, earning an estimated $700,000. Seferi made his league debut at the start of the 2022–23 Ukrainian Premier League season, playing 22 minutes against Zorya Luhansk, and quickly established himself as an ever-present figure in the starting lineup, featuring in the vast majority of matches and regularly completing the full 90 minutes. On 8 October 2022, Seferi scored his first goal in his sixth appearance, netting a late winner in the 88th minute in a 2–1 victory against Chornomorets Odesa. On 29 October 2022, Seferi scored in a 2–0 win against Mynai, netting the opening goal in the 19th minute. On 9 November 2022, Seferi was sent off in a 1–0 away defeat to Kryvbas Kryvyi Rih, receiving a second yellow card in the first half. On 19 November 2022, Seferi scored the opening goal in a 2–1 away win against Kolos.

On 5 March 2023, Seferi scored twice to give Vorskla Poltava a 2–0 early lead against Zorya Luhansk, opening the scoring in the 6th minute and adding a second goal from a penalty ten minutes later, bringing his league tally to six goals; despite Seferi's early goals, Vorskla eventually lost 3–2 after Zorya came back scoring in the 57th minute, equalizing and overturning the score in stoppage time. On 12 March 2023, Seferi scored twice in a 2–2 away draw against Veres Rivne, netting in the 25th minute to give his team the lead and later converting a penalty in the 86th minute to secure the draw, marking his fourth consecutive match on the scoresheet and taking his tally to eight league goals. On 16 April 2023, Seferi scored the only goal in an away win against Chornomorets Odesa, marking his ninth goal of the season and placing him third among the league's top scorers. On 22 April 2023, Seferi scored twice and provided an assist in the first half of the matchday 22 against Metalist Kharkiv, converting two penalties and contributing to a 3–1 lead at half-time, as the match eventually ended in a 3–2 win. On 14 May 2023, Seferi scored his 12th league goal of the season in a 2–0 away win against Lviv, converting a penalty in the 56th minute to give his team the lead. On 4 June 2023, Seferi scored in a 2–1 win over Shakhtar Donetsk on the final matchday of the season, helping Vorskla Poltava secure qualification for the UEFA Europa Conference League for the following season. He finished the season with 13 league goals, joint-second in the scoring charts.

==== Loan to Baniyas ====
On 22 July 2023, Seferi joined Baniyas on a season-long loan with an option to buy, moving to the UAE Pro League, in a deal reportedly worth around €900,000. During his spell, Seferi was a key contributor, scoring nine goals and providing three assists in his first 19 league appearances in the 2023–24 UAE Pro League, being involved in a significant portion of the team's goals, most notably on 26 April 2024 when he scored twice and provided two assists against Hatta in a 4–2 comeback win after trailing 0–2. By the end of the season, Seferi had made 28 appearances and scored 12 goals across all domestic competitions, including the President's Cup and League Cup, as Baniyas retained their top-flight status.

=== Bodrum ===
On 31 August 2024, Seferi joined Bodrum for a reported transfer fee of €1.5 million. He made his debut on 14 September 2024 in the 2024–25 Süper Lig matchday 5 against İstanbul Başakşehir, featuring in a 1–0 away defeat. He quickly established himself as a regular starter, primarily playing as an attacking midfielder but also featuring as a forward, making a total of 30 league appearances, 22 as a starter, and contributing goals as the campaign progressed. He scored his first goal on 20 September 2024, netting the winner in a 1–0 victory over Hatayspor in only his second appearance. He followed with another goal on 29 September 2024 in a 3–1 home win over Adana Demirspor. On 13 December 2024, he scored his third and final league goal in a 2–0 home victory over Sivasspor, opening the scoring in the 49th minute. On 2 April 2025, Seferi scored a goal and provided an assist within five minutes to help Bodrum take a 2–1 lead against Trabzonspor in the quarter-finals of the 2024–25 Turkish Cup; however, Trabzonspor overturned the result and won 3–2 after extra time, with the decisive goal in the 98th minute, while Seferi played until the 101st minute.

On 2 February 2026, he scored in a 3–0 win against Serik Belediyespor. On 23 March 2026, Seferi scored the only goal in a 1–0 home win over İstanbulspor in the 2025–26 TFF 1. Lig, converting an assist from Arlind Ajeti.

=== Kayserispor ===
On 7 August 2026, Seferi joined Kayserispor in the TFF 1. Lig ahead of the 2026–27 season, signing a three-year contract. He made his debut on 9 August, scoring both goals in a 2–0 away win over Vanspor in the opening TFF 1. Lig fixture, finding the net in the ninth and 56th minutes. On 14 September, he scored twice in a 4–0 victory over İstanbulspor, taking his tally to seven goals in his first seven league appearances. He remained a regular starter, featuring as a starter in each of Kayserispor's first 13 consecutive league matches. On 2 November, Seferi scored and provided an assist in Kayserispor's 6–0 victory over Muğlaspor in the league, taking his league tally to ten goals and two assists for the season.

== International career ==
=== Macedonia ===
From 2009 to 2016, Seferi represented Macedonia at youth international level, featuring for the U15, U17, U18, U19 and U21 teams, making 29 appearances and scoring 17 goals.

On 26 May 2014, Seferi made his senior international debut for Macedonia as a 57th-minute substitute in a 2–0 win over Cameroon, becoming the team's youngest player at 17 years and six months and breaking Goran Pandev's record, set in 2001 at the age of 17 years, 10 months and 11 days.

=== Albania ===
In January 2017, following his appointment as Albania U21 coach, Alban Bushi reportedly persuaded Seferi to switch his international allegiance to Albania, as he had not made a competitive appearance for Macedonia. On 20 March, Seferi was granted Albanian citizenship, followed by FIFA approval to represent Albania in competitive matches on 8 June. He made his competitive debut four days later in Albania U21's 2019 UEFA European Under-21 Championship qualifying campaign and, after undergoing groin surgery later that year, returned to feature regularly in the remainder of the campaign, scoring both goals in a 2–2 away draw against Estonia on 16 October 2018 in the final fixture.

Seferi received his first senior team call-up by manager Edoardo Reja for the closing fixtures of UEFA Euro 2020 qualifying against Andorra and France in November 2019, debuting against the former as a second-half substitute in a 2–2 draw at Elbasan Arena. Seferi made three appearances in the 2020–21 UEFA Nations League C in autumn 2020, including one start and two substitute appearances, totalling approximately 90 minutes, but remained unused in Albania's final match, a 3–2 win over Belarus that secured first place in the group and promotion to League B. On 5 June 2022, he scored his first international goal in a 1–1 away draw against Iceland in Albania's opening match of the 2022–23 UEFA Nations League B. He made no further appearances in the campaign, as Albania collected only one additional point and finished bottom of their group.

During the UEFA Euro 2024 qualifying campaign under manager Sylvinho, Seferi was initially a substitute before becoming a starter on the left wing, competing with Myrto Uzuni and making four starts in which he played almost the full 90 minutes. On 12 October 2023, he scored twice in a 3–0 win over the Czech Republic, helping Albania retain first place in Group E with 13 points and move closer to qualification for the finals with two matches remained. On 17 November, Seferi won a penalty converted by Sokol Cikalleshi in a 1–1 draw against Moldova, a result that mathematically secured Albania's qualification for the European Championship for only the second time in its history. After a goalless home draw against the Faroe Islands in their final match three days later, Albania finished top of the group for the first time, level on 15 points with the Czech Republic but ahead on head-to-head results.

He was named in Albania's 26-man squad for the final tournament in June 2024 in Germany and made his major tournament debut in the opening Group B match against Italy in Dortmund on 15 June, playing 68 minutes in a 2–1 defeat after Albania had taken the lead through Nedim Bajrami's record-breaking goal after 23 seconds. He also appeared as a substitute in the second group match against Croatia in Hamburg on 19 June, playing the final 26 minutes as Albania secured a 2–2 draw with a late equaliser to earn their only point of the tournament. Albania were eliminated in the group stage after losing 1–0 to Spain in Düsseldorf in their final match.

== Personal life ==
Seferi stated that, although he was previously known and registered in Macedonia as Tauljant Sulejmanov (Macedonian: Таулјант Сулејманов), his family surname is Seferi, which he has preferred to use since switching to represent Albania. His father is Fatmir Seferi.

== Career statistics ==
=== Club ===
As of 21 November 2026

Appearances and goals by club, season and competition
Club	Season	League			Cup		Europe (Note: Includes UEFA Champions League, UEFA Europa League and UEFA Conference League)		Other (Note: Includes Superkupa e Shqipërisë)		Total	
Club	Season	Division	Apps	Goals	Apps	Goals	Apps	Goals	Apps	Goals	Apps	Goals
Rabotnicki	2013–14	Macedonian First League	16	3	4	1	—		—		20	4
Rabotnicki	2014–15	Macedonian First League	12	0	1	0	2	0	—		15	0
Rabotnicki	Total		28	3	5	1	2	0	—		35	4
Young Boys II	2014–15	Swiss 1. Liga	1	0	—		—		—		1	0
Young Boys II	2015–16	Swiss 1. Liga	1	0	—		—		—		1	0
Young Boys II	2016–17	Swiss 1. Liga	12	6	—		—		—		12	6
Young Boys II	Total		14	6	—		—		—		14	6
Young Boys	2014–15	Swiss Super League	1	0	—		1	0	—		2	0
Young Boys	2015–16	Swiss Super League	0	0	—		0	0	—		0	0
Young Boys	2016–17	Swiss Super League	7	0	0	0	0	0	—		7	0
Young Boys	2017–18	Swiss Super League	0	0	—		—		—		0	0
Young Boys	2018–19	Swiss Super League	0	0	—		—		—		0	0
Young Boys	2019–20	Swiss Super League	0	0	—		—		—		0	0
Young Boys	2020–21	Swiss Super League	0	0	—		0	0	—		0	0
Young Boys	Total		8	0	0	0	1	0	—		9	0
Wohlen (loan)	2017–18	Swiss Challenge League	13	3	—		—		—		13	3
Winterthur (loan)	2018–19	Swiss Challenge League	32	10	2	0	—		—		34	10
Neuchâtel Xamax (loan)	2019–20	Swiss Super League	29	1	1	0	—		—		30	1
Tirana (loan)	2020–21	Kategoria Superiore	23	7	—		—		—		23	7
Tirana	2021–22	Kategoria Superiore	35	19	2	0	6 (Note: Played for Teuta on a short-time loan for European competition matches)	0	—		43	19
Tirana	2022–23	Kategoria Superiore	1	0	0	0	—		—		1	0
Tirana	Total		36	19	2	0	6	0	—		44	19
Vorskla Poltava	2022–23	Ukrainian Premier League	28	13	—		4	0	—		32	13
Baniyas (loan)	2023–24	UAE Pro League	25	11	1	0	—		2	1	28	12
Bodrum	2024–25	Süper Lig	30	3	1	1	—		—		31	4
Bodrum	2025–26	TFF 1. Lig	40	17	2	0	—		—		42	17
Bodrum	Total		70	20	3	1	—		—		73	21
Kayserispor	2026–27	TFF 1. Lig	15	11	—		—		—		15	11
Career total			321	104	14	2	13	0	2	1	350	107

=== International ===
As of 26 September 2026

Appearances and goals by national team and year
National team	Year	Apps	Goals
Macedonia	2014	2	0
Total		2	0
Albania	2019	1	0
Albania	2020	4	0
Albania	2021	3	0
Albania	2022	2	1
Albania	2023	7	2
Albania	2024	9	0
Albania	2025	0	0
Albania	2026	2	0
Total		28	3

Scores and results list Albanian goal tally first, score column indicates score after each Seferi goal.

List of international goals scored by Taulant Seferi
No.	Date	Venue	Opponent	Score	Result	Competition
1	6 June 2022	Laugardalsvöllur, Reykjavík, Iceland	Iceland	1–0	1–1	2022–23 Nations League
2	12 October 2023	Arena Kombëtare, Tirana, Albania	Czech Republic	2–0	3–0	UEFA Euro 2024 qualifying
3	12 October 2023	Arena Kombëtare, Tirana, Albania	Czech Republic	3–0	3–0	UEFA Euro 2024 qualifying

== Honours ==
Rabotnički

- Macedonian First League: 2013–14
- Macedonian Cup: 2013–14

Young Boys

- Swiss Super League runners-up: 2014–15, 2015–16, 2016–17

Tirana

- Kategoria Superiore: 2021–22
