= Ismail Ismaili =

Macedonian association football player

Personal information
- Full name: Ismail Ismaili; Исмаил Исмаили
- Date of birth: 14 November 1981 (age 44)
- Place of birth: Tetovo, SFR Yugoslavia
- Height: 1.80 m (5 ft 11 in)
- Position: Striker

Senior career*
Years	Team	Apps	(Gls)
1998–2001	Shkëndija	66	(24)
2001–2003	Pomorac Kostrena	33	(21)
2004–2005	Shkëndija	41	(12)
2005–2007	Makedonija	50	(5)
2007–2012	Renova	134	(8)
2013	Shkëndija	5	(0)
2014	Zajazi	19	(9)
2014–2015	Rrufeja		

International career^{‡}
2005–2006	Macedonia	2	(0)

Managerial career
- 2017–2018: Zajazi
- * Club domestic league appearances and goals as of 28 May 2014 ‡ National team caps and goals as of 24 January 2010

Ismail Ismaili (Macedonian: Исмаил Исмаили; born 14 November 1981) is an ethnic Albanian footballer from North Macedonia, who last played for FK Rufeja.

== Club career ==
Ismaili played over 200 games in the Macedonian league, winning the title in 2010 with Renova. Ismaili scored for FK Renova in a 2011 UEFA Cup qualifying match against Glentoran, but his side went out 3–3 on penalties.

== International career ==
He made his senior debut for North Macedonia in a June 2005 FIFA World Cup qualification match away against Armenia and has earned a total of 2 caps, scoring no goals. His second and final international was a March 2006 friendly match against Bulgaria.
