= Darko Micevski =

Macedonian footballer

Personal information
- Full name: Darko Micevski; Дарко Мицевски
- Date of birth: 12 April 1992 (age 34)
- Place of birth: Skopje, Macedonia
- Height: 1.80 m (5 ft 11 in)
- Position: Defensive midfielder

Team information
- Current team: Sileks
- Number: 18

Youth career
- –2009: Vardar

Senior career*
Years	Team	Apps	(Gls)
2009	Sevojno	0	(0)
2010	Sloboda Užice	0	(0)
2011–2012	Rabotnički	23	(0)
2013	Teteks	14	(0)
2013–2015	OFK Beograd	38	(4)
2015	Teteks		
2016	Novi Pazar	31	(0)
2017	Minsk	28	(0)
2018	Nejmeh	11	(1)
2018–2020	Vardar	69	(15)
2021	RFS	17	(3)
2022–2024	Vardar	51	(10)
2025–	Sileks	11	(0)

International career^{‡}
	Macedonia U17	3	(1)
	Macedonia U19	14	(1)
2012–2014	Macedonia U21	18	(0)
2020	North Macedonia	2	(0)
- * Club domestic league appearances and goals as of 1 June 2025 ‡ National team caps and goals as of 19 November 2020

Darko Micevski (Macedonian: Дарко Мицевски, born 12 April 1992) is a Macedonian footballer who plays for Sileks.

== Club career ==
Born in Skopje, he played in the youth team of FK Rabotnički before moving to Serbia in summer 2009 and joining FK Sevojno playing in the Serbian First League, later merged with FK Sloboda Užice and promoted to the 2010–11 Serbian SuperLiga. During the winter break of the 2010–11 season he returned to Macedonia and joined his former team FK Rabotnički where he played in the First Macedonian Football League for 2 years. During the winter break of the 2012–13 season he moved to another Macedonian top league sid, FK Teteks, having helped them to win the Macedonian Cup that season by scoring the only goal for his team at the final. He played with Teteks in their 2013–14 UEFA Europa League qualifying matches, before returning to Serbia and after a trial joining OFK Beograd. He made his debut for OFK in the 2013–14 Serbian SuperLiga as a substitute in the 3rd round match against FK Čukarički.

== International career ==
Micevski represented Macedonia at U-17, U-19 and U-21 levels.

== Honours ==
Teteks

- Macedonian Cup: 2012–13
