= 2013–14 Macedonian First Football League =

Macedonian First League
- Season: 2013–14
- Dates: 4 August 2013 – 18 May 2014
- Champions: Rabotnichki; 4th domestic title
- Relegated: Gorno Lisiche; Makedonija G.P. Napredok; Gostivar
- Champions League: Rabotnichki
- Europa League: Turnovo; Metalurg; Shkëndija
- Matches: 198
- Goals: 518 (2.62 per match)
- Top goalscorer: Dejan Blazhevski (19 goals)
- Biggest home win: Vardar 6–0 Napredok (30 March 2014)
- Biggest away win: Pelister 0–4 Renova (30 October 2013); Gostivar 1–5 Metalurg (26 February 2014); Renova 2–6 Rabotnichki (19 April 2014)
- Highest scoring: Rabotnichki 5–3 Turnovo (22 September 2013); Renova 2–6 Rabotnichki (19 April 2014)
- Longest winning run: 7 games Shkëndija
- Longest unbeaten run: 13 games Vardar
- Longest winless run: 21 games Napredok
- Longest losing run: 9 games Napredok; Gostivar

The 2013–14 Macedonian First League was the 22nd season of the Macedonian First Football League, the highest football league of Macedonia. Vardar are the defending champions after winning their seventh Macedonian championship at the end of the 2012–13 season. It began on 4 August 2013 and ended on 18 May 2014. This was the final season with 12 teams, because the Football Federation of Macedonia approved reducing the league to 10 teams. Therefore, 4 teams was directly relegated.

== Promotion and relegation ==
At the start of the 2013–14 season

Promoted from 2012–13 Second League

- Makedonija G.P. (winners)
- Gostivar (runners-up)
- Gorno Lisiche (Fourth placed; won play-off match)

Relegated to 2013–14 Second League

- Drita (9th; lost play-off match)
- Teteks (11th)
- Sileks (12th)

At the end of the 2013–14 season

Promoted from 2013–14 Second League

- Sileks (winners)
- Teteks (runners-up)

Relegated to 2014–15 Second League

- Gorno Lisiche (9th)
- Makedonija G.P. (10th)
- Napredok (11th)
- Gostivar (12th)

== Participating teams ==
Location of teams in 2013–14 Macedonian First League

Club	City	Stadium	Capacity
Bregalnica	Shtip	Gradski stadion Shtip	4,000
Euromilk Gorno Lisiche	Skopje	Stadion Gorno Lisiche (Note: Gorno Lisiche was played their home games on Boris Trajkovski Stadium because their Stadion Gorno Lisiche doesn't fulfill criteria for First League.)	1,500
Gostivar	Gostivar	Gradski stadion Gostivar	1,000
Makedonija G.P.	Skopje	Stadion Gjorche Petrov	3,000
Metalurg	Skopje	Stadion Zhelezarnica	3,000
Napredok	Kičevo	Gradski stadion Kichevo	5,000
Pelister	Bitola	Stadion Tumbe Kafe	8,000
Rabotnichki	Skopje	Philip II Arena	33,460
Renova	Djepchishte	Gradski stadion Tetovo	15,000
Shkëndija	Tetovo	Gradski stadion Tetovo	15,000
Horizont Turnovo	Turnovo	Stadion Kukush	1,500
Vardar	Skopje	Philip II Arena	33,460

=== Personnel and kits ===
Note: Flags indicate national team as has been defined under FIFA eligibility rules. Players may hold more than one non-FIFA nationality.

Team	Manager	Captain	Kit manufacturer	Shirt sponsor
Bregalnica	(Turkey) Ali Güneş	(North Macedonia) Goran Zdravkov		
Gorno Lisiče	(North Macedonia) Ljubodrag Milošević	(North Macedonia) Aleksandar Pandovski		Euromilk
Gostivar	(North Macedonia) Mite Mitev		Nike	
Makedonija G.P.	(North Macedonia) Marjan Sekulovski		Nike	
Metalurg	(North Macedonia) Srgjan Zaharievski	(North Macedonia) Mile Krstev	Legea	Makstil
Napredok	(North Macedonia) Dragan Mateski		Legea	
Pelister	(North Macedonia) Dragan Bocheski	(North Macedonia) Goran Pashovski	Jako	Pelisterka
Rabotnichki	(North Macedonia) Igor Angelovski	(North Macedonia) Blazhe Todorovski	Joma	
Renova	(North Macedonia) Qatip Osmani	(North Macedonia) Izair Emini	Jako	Renova
Shkëndija	(Albania) Shpëtim Duro	(North Macedonia) Artim Pollozhani	Nike	Ecolog
Turnovo	(North Macedonia) Goce Sedloski	(North Macedonia) Stojan Dimovski	Jako	Vitaminka
Vardar	(Russia) Sergey Andreyev	(Serbia) Radenko Bojović	Li-Ning	

== League table ==
Pos	Team	Pld	W	D	L	GF	GA	GD	Pts	Qualification or relegation
1	Rabotnichki (C)	33	18	8	7	66	35	+31	62	Qualification to Champions League second qualifying round
2	Horizont Turnovo	33	18	6	9	61	33	+28	60	Qualification to Europa League first qualifying round (Note: Metalurg qualified for the Europa League first qualifying round as a runner-up of the 2013–14 Macedonian Football Cup.)
3	Metalurg	33	16	11	6	48	29	+19	59	Qualification to Europa League first qualifying round
4	Shkëndija	33	16	9	8	53	32	+21	57	Qualification to Europa League first qualifying round
5	Vardar	33	15	11	7	55	32	+23	56	
6	Pelister	33	14	10	9	40	40	0	52	
7	Bregalnica Shtip	33	11	11	11	34	34	0	44	
8	Renova	33	10	14	9	42	46	−4	44	
9	Euromilk Gorno Lisiche (R)	33	9	12	12	34	37	−3	39	Relegation to Macedonian Second League
10	Makedonija G.P. (R)	33	9	5	19	40	56	−16	32	Relegation to Macedonian Second League
11	Napredok (R)	33	3	9	21	27	75	−48	18	Relegation to Macedonian Second League
12	Gostivar (R)	33	3	6	24	19	70	−51	15	Relegation to Macedonian Second League

Source: MacedonianFootball.com
Rules for classification: 1) Points; 2) Goal difference; 3) Goals scored; 4) Head-to-head points; 5) Head-to-head goal difference; 6) Head-to-head away goals scored (only if two teams); 7) Head-to-head goals scored; 8) Draw; 9) Play-off. (Note: Criteria 2, 3 and 8 is only used if not deciding Champion, teams for UEFA competitions or relegation).
(C) Champions; (R) Relegated

== Results ==
Every team will play three times against each other team for a total of 33 matches. The first 22 matchdays will consist of a regular double round-robin schedule. The league standings at this point will then be used to determine the games for the last 11 matchdays.

Home \ Away	BRE	EGL	GOS	MGP	MET	NAP	PEL	RAB	REN	SKE	TUR	VAR	BRE	EGL	GOS	MGP	MET	NAP	PEL	RAB	REN	SKE	TUR	VAR
Bregalnica Shtip	—	1–1	2–1	0–0	0–0	2–2	3–0	1–1	0–0	1–1	2–0	1–1	—	—	3–0	1–2	0–1	—	—	—	—	—	1–0	0–0
Euromilk G.L.	0–3	—	2–2	1–0	0–0	2–0	2–2	1–0	1–2	2–1	0–2	2–2	0–0	—	1–1	3–1	—	4–1	—	—	—	0–2	—	—
Gostivar	0–1	0–2	—	0–1	3–1	0–0	1–1	2–0	1–1	0–0	0–1	1–2	—	—	—	—	1–5	2–3	—	—	—	0–3	1–2	0–2
Makedonija	3–0	0–1	4–0	—	1–1	3–1	0–0	2–3	2–1	0–0	2–1	1–3	—	—	2–1	—	1–3	—	—	—	—	1–3	1–2	2–2
Metalurg	1–2	2–1	4–0	1–0	—	0–0	2–4	0–0	1–0	2–0	1–0	3–0	—	1–0	—	—	—	2–0	3–1	—	2–2	1–2	1–2	2–1
Napredok	0–2	1–1	3–0	2–1	0–2	—	2–2	1–3	1–1	0–0	2–2	0–1	1–3	—	—	1–3	—	—	1–3	0–2	0–0	—	—	—
Pelister	1–0	1–0	1–0	2–1	2–2	4–0	—	1–0	0–4	1–0	0–0	1–2	1–1	1–0	2–0	2–1	1–3	—	—	1–2	—	—	—	—
Rabotnichki	3–0	2–2	2–0	1–0	1–1	4–3	4–0	—	0–0	5–0	5–3	2–1	4–0	2–0	3–0	2–0	1–2	—	—	—	—	—	—	3–1
Renova	3–1	0–0	3–0	2–1	1–1	2–0	1–2	1–1	—	1–3	4–2	0–0	1–0	1–1	0–1	4–2	—	—	2–1	2–6	—	—	—	—
Shkëndija	2–0	0–3	4–0	3–0	0–0	3–2	0–0	2–2	0–0	—	0–3	3–1	0–2	—	—	—	—	4–0	4–0	3–1	5–0	—	—	—
Horizont Turnovo	3–1	1–1	5–1	5–1	0–0	4–0	0–2	3–0	4–0	3–1	—	2–0	—	2–0	—	—	—	4–0	1–0	1–0	1–1	0–2	—	—
Vardar	1–0	2–0	4–0	4–1	3–0	3–0	1–1	1–1	1–1	0–0	1–1	—	—	1–0	—	—	—	6–0	0–0	—	5–1	1–2	2–1	—

Source: MacedonianFootball.com
Legend: Blue = home team win; Yellow = draw; Red = away team win.

== Season statistics ==
=== Top scorers ===
As of 18 May 2014

Rank	Player	Club	Goals
1	(North Macedonia) Dejan Blazhevski	Turnovo	19
2	(North Macedonia) Borche Manevski	Rabotnichki	17
3	(North Macedonia) Muzafer Ejupi	Turnovo	15
4	(Brazil) Stênio Júnior	Pelister & Shkëndija	13
4	(North Macedonia) Krste Velkoski	Rabotnichki	13
6	(North Macedonia) Ermedin Adem	Makedonija G.P.	11
7	(North Macedonia) Vladimir Mojsovski	Napredok	10
7	(North Macedonia) Aco Stojkov	Vardar	10
7	(Bulgaria) Dimitar Vodenicharov	Pelister	10
7	(Croatia) Bojan Vručina	Shkëndija	10

- Players whose names are written in italic letters played only in the first part of the League

== See also ==
- 2013–14 Macedonian Football Cup
- 2013–14 Macedonian Second Football League
- 2013–14 Macedonian Third Football League
