= Igor Angelovski =

Macedonian football manager and player

Personal information
- Date of birth: 2 June 1976 (age 50)
- Place of birth: Skopje, SR Macedonia, SFR Yugoslavia
- Position: Midfielder

Team information
- Current team: Tajikistan (head coach)

Senior career*
Years	Team	Apps	(Gls)
1994–1996	Makedonija GP		
1996–1997	Pelister		
1998–2000	Publikum Celje	19	(3)
2000–2001	Cementarnica	25	(4)
2001–2002	Pobeda	23	(1)
2002–2008	Cementarnica		
Total		67	(8)

Managerial career
- 2013–2015: Rabotnički
- 2015: North Macedonia (assistant)
- 2015–2021: North Macedonia
- 2022: Gorica
- 2023: Caspiy
- 2025: Ethnikos Achna
- 2026–: Tajikistan
- * Club domestic league appearances and goals

Igor Angelovski (Macedonian: Игор Ангеловски; born 2 June 1976) is a Macedonian professional football manager and former player who is currently the head coach for Tajikistan.

== Playing career ==
As player he played in the Slovenian First League with Publikum Celje between 1998 and 2000. He also played with Makedonija Gjorce Petrov, Pelister, Cementarnica (twice) and Pobeda.

== Managerial career ==
In October 2015, Angelovski became the new manager of the Macedonia national team as a successor to Ljubinko Drulović who has left to the Serbian SuperLiga club Partizan. Among the national team, to December 2015, Angelovski had coached Rabotnički in the Macedonian First League. During his time as national team manager for Macedonia, his 3-5-2 formation helped the side qualify for its first major tournament at Euro 2020 by winning the League D after finishing first in its League D group. Despite this, the new administration that took over in 2019 was intent on having their own manager, except that the team was successful. It eventually led to a scandal regarding Angelovski's tenure, as there were opportunities to allow him to continue given that he was without contract, but not formally told he wasn't to be renewed for several months. As such, he was a de facto manager with no games taking place during that time. Eventually Angelovski made it know that he would not be retained by the new administration, with the convenient performance at Euros a presumably justifiable cause for dismissal. The situation revolving Angelovski was somewhat of a precursor to the departure of Stefan Ristovski in 2023, who was unhappy with the direction under Angelovski's replacement as head coach.

He was replaced at Croatian side Gorica by Željko Sopić in November 2022. In April 2023, Angelovski became the new manager of Caspiy.

In April 2026, Angelovski was appointed as the new head coach of Tajikistan.

== Managerial statistics ==
As of 17 July 2023

Team	From	To	Record				
Team	From	To	G	W	D	L	Win %
Rabotnički	1 July 2013	16 December 2015	86	43	24	19	50.00
North Macedonia	16 October 2015	31 July 2021	53	23	11	19	43.40
Gorica	27 August 2022	5 November 2022	11	1	2	8	9.09
Caspiy	17 April 2023	17 July 2023	10	1	4	5	10.00
Ethnikos Achna	2 October 2025	13 December 2025	10	3	0	7	30.00
Tajikistan	30 April 2026		6	3	1	2	50.00
Total			176	74	42	60	42.05

== Honours ==
=== Player ===
Cementarnica

- Macedonian Cup: 2002–03

Pobeda

- Macedonian Cup: 2001–02

=== Manager ===
Rabotnički

- Macedonian First League: 2013–14
- Macedonian Cup: 2013–14, 2014–15
