= Muhamed Useini =

Macedonian footballer

Personal information
- Date of birth: 21 November 1988 (age 37)
- Place of birth: Tetovo, SFR Yugoslavia
- Height: 1.81 m (5 ft 11 in)
- Position: Midfielder

Team information
- Current team: Llapi
- Number: 22

Youth career
- 2005–2009: Shkëndija

Senior career*
Years	Team	Apps	(Gls)
2009–2013	Shkëndija	97	(6)
2013–2014	Rabotnički	13	(0)
2014–2016	Shkëndija	49	(1)
2016–2017	Renova	40	(2)
2017–2019	Flamurtari	50	(2)
2019	Renova	13	(3)
2019–2022	Gjilani	83	(2)
2022–2024	Prishtina	61	(3)
2024–	Llapi	17	(0)

International career
2011	Macedonia	1	(0)
- * Club domestic league appearances and goals as of 26 June 2025

Muhamed Useini (Macedonian: Мухамед Хусеини; born 21 November 1988) is a Macedonian professional footballer who plays as a midfielder for Kosovan club Llapi.

== Club career ==
=== Flamurtari Vlorë ===
On 22 June 2017, Useini completed a transfer to Albanian club Flamurtari Vlorë by signing a one-year contract.

== International career ==
In September 2011, Useini received a call-up for the UEFA Euro 2012 qualifying match against Russia and Andorra.UEFA Euro 2012 qualifying Group B He made his senior debut on 6 September, playing in the last 13 minutes of a 1–0 home win against Andorra. It proved to be his sole international appearance.

== Honours ==
Rabotnički

- Macedonian First Football League: 2013–14
- Macedonian Football Cup: 2013–14
