= Milovan Petrovikj =

Macedonian footballer

Personal information
- Full name: Milovan Petrovikj; Милован Петровиќ
- Date of birth: 23 January 1990 (age 36)
- Place of birth: Kavadarci, SFR Yugoslavia
- Height: 1.74 m (5 ft 8 1/2 in)
- Position: Midfielder

Team information
- Current team: Tikvesh
- Number: 11

Youth career
- –2008: Tikvesh

Senior career*
Years	Team	Apps	(Gls)
2008–2009	Tikvesh	21	(4)
2009–2010	Pobeda	25	(1)
2010–2016	Rabotnički	156	(5)
2016–2018	Osijek	21	(0)
2017–2018	→ Sepsi OSK (loan)	29	(1)
2018	Larissa		
2019	Rabotnički	15	(0)
2019	Sutjeska Nikšić	8	(0)
2020–2021	Vardar	14	(1)
2021	Radnik Surdulica	2	(0)
2023	FK Zlatibor Cajetina	17	(0)
2023–2024	Club Eagles	1	(0)
2024–	Tikvesh	41	(0)

International career^{‡}
2008–2010	Macedonia U21	5	(0)
2015–2016	Macedonia	9	(0)
- * Club domestic league appearances and goals as of 1 June 2026 ‡ National team caps and goals as of 9 October 2016

Milovan Petrovikj^{[a]} (Macedonian: Милован Петровиќ; born 23 January 1990 in Kavadarci) is a Macedonian footballer who plays as a central midfielder for Tikvesh.

== International career ==
He made his senior debut for Macedonia in a September 2015 European Championship qualification match against Luxembourg and has earned a total of 9 caps, scoring no goals. His final international was an October 2016 FIFA World Cup qualification match against Italy.

== Honours ==
Rabotnički

- Macedonian First League: 2013–14
- Macedonian Football Cup: 2013–14, 2014–15

== Notes ==
a.	Macedonian spelling: Milovan Petrovikj, Милован Петровиќ, Romanized spelling: Milovan Petroviḱ. Serbian spelling in its both forms: Милован Петровић or Milovan Petrović.
