= Filip Ristovski =

Macedonian footballer

Personal information
- Date of birth: 3 January 1995 (age 31)
- Place of birth: Negotino, Macedonia
- Height: 1.74 m (5 ft 9 in)
- Position: Right-back

Youth career
- –2013: Metalurg Skopje

Senior career*
Years	Team	Apps	(Gls)
2013–2015	Metalurg Skopje	48	(0)
2016	Borac Banja Luka	8	(0)
2016–2018	Javor Ivanjica	36	(0)
2018	Sileks	13	(0)
2019	Shkupi	18	(0)
2019–2021	Borec	46	(0)
2021–2023	TuS Mechtersheim	63	(0)

International career
2013	Macedonia U-19	3	(0)
2014–2015	Macedonia U-21	7	(0)
- * Club domestic league appearances and goals as of 16:53, 12 April 2025 (UTC)

Filip Ristovski (Macedonian: Филип Ристовски; born 3 January 1995) is a Macedonian football who plays as a right-back.

== Club career ==
Born in Negotino, Ristovski played two and a half seasons with FK Metalurg Skopje in the Macedonian First Football League.

During the winter-brak of the 2015–16 season he moved abroad to Bosnian side FK Borac Banja Luka and played with them the second half of the 2015–16 Premier League of Bosnia and Herzegovina.

As Borac ended relegated, Ristovski decided to move, and after a successful trial period, he signed with Serbian side FK Javor Ivanjica in August 2016. He made his debut for Javor in the 2016–17 Serbian SuperLiga on 25 February 2017 in a 23rd-round game against FK Spartak Subotica in a home 3–2 defeat.

Ristovski joined FK Shkupi in January 2019.

== International career ==
Ristovski played for Macedonia U-19 and U-21 national teams.
