= KF Zajazi =

- Full name: Klubi Futbollistik Zajazi
- Nickname: Shqipet e Uskanës (Uskana Eagles)
- Founded: 1979 (34 years ago)
- Ground: Gradski stadion Kičevo
- Capacity: 5,000
- Chairman: Fekri Ahmedi
- Manager: Nazmi Ajdini
- 2025–26: Third League (West), 12th (withdraw)
- Website: https://www.facebook.com/pages/Kf-Zajazi/159035744156072?ref=br_tf
| Home colours | Away colours | Third colours |

KF Zajazi (Macedonian: ФК Зајас, English: FC Zajas) is a football club based in the village of Zajaz, Kičevo, North Macedonia. They were recently competed in the Macedonian Third League (West Division). KF Zajazi was founded in 1979. The club's major success was achieved in the season 2012–13 when they won the Macedonian Third League – West. Then in the play off game they faced FK Babi Stip which they won 1–0 and got promoted to the Macedonian Second League for the first time in their history.

== History ==
=== Early years 1977–2000 ===
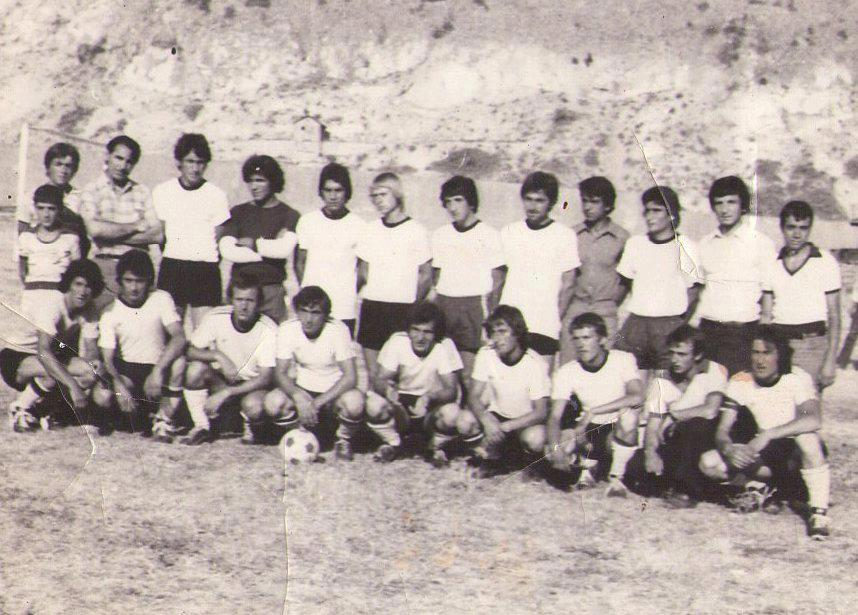
KF Zajazi's first ever squad in 1977

KF Zajazi was founded in 1977, but they didn't play a competitive match until 1979, so their official foundation by the Macedonian Football Federation is recognized as 1979 instead of 1977. Before entering a competitive league, KF Zajazi mainly played friendly matches against other local teams.

Since the breakup of the Republic of Macedonia from Yugoslavia and the declaration of independence, KF Zajazi have mainly played their trade in the 4th and 3rd Macedonian Football Leagues.

=== First success 2001–2011 ===
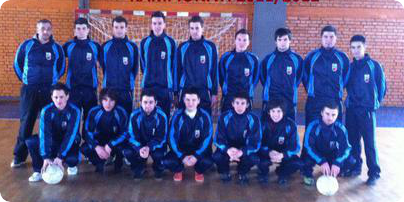
KF Zajazi's 2011–2012 Squad

It was the 2001–02 season when KF Zajazi for the first time was considered for being as one of the favorites for a promotion in the Macedonian Second Football League, with the city rivals FK Vlazrimi being the other one. And as it was expected both teams lived up to their expectations. In a very intense season, both teams managed to beat their respective city rivals at their home games, with the KF Zajazi's win being the most dramatic one, as they won against FK Vlazrimi 1–0 in the penultimate fixture of the season, thus tying them in the top of the table with equal points. Both teams managed to win their last season games away from homes and they both finished on the top of the table with equal points. The Football Federation of Macedonia decided that a play off match has to be played between the two teams in order to be decided which team will get promoted to the Macedonian Second Football League. The two rivals locked horns again, this time, for the safety of the fans the Football Federation of Macedonia decided that the game will not be played in Kičevo, the hometown of both teams. But the story was a sad ending story for KF Zajazi as they lost the playoff game and FK Vlazrimi instead gained promotion to the Macedonian Second Football League. For more than a decade KF Zajazi fought a hard battle against financial difficulties and was unable to replicate the success they had in the 2001–02 season. Although they managed to sit in the middle of the table of the Macedonian Third League – West for most of the seasons, but nothing more than that. They were never considered as a strong favorite for a promotion to the Macedonian Second Football League.

=== New era 2011– ===
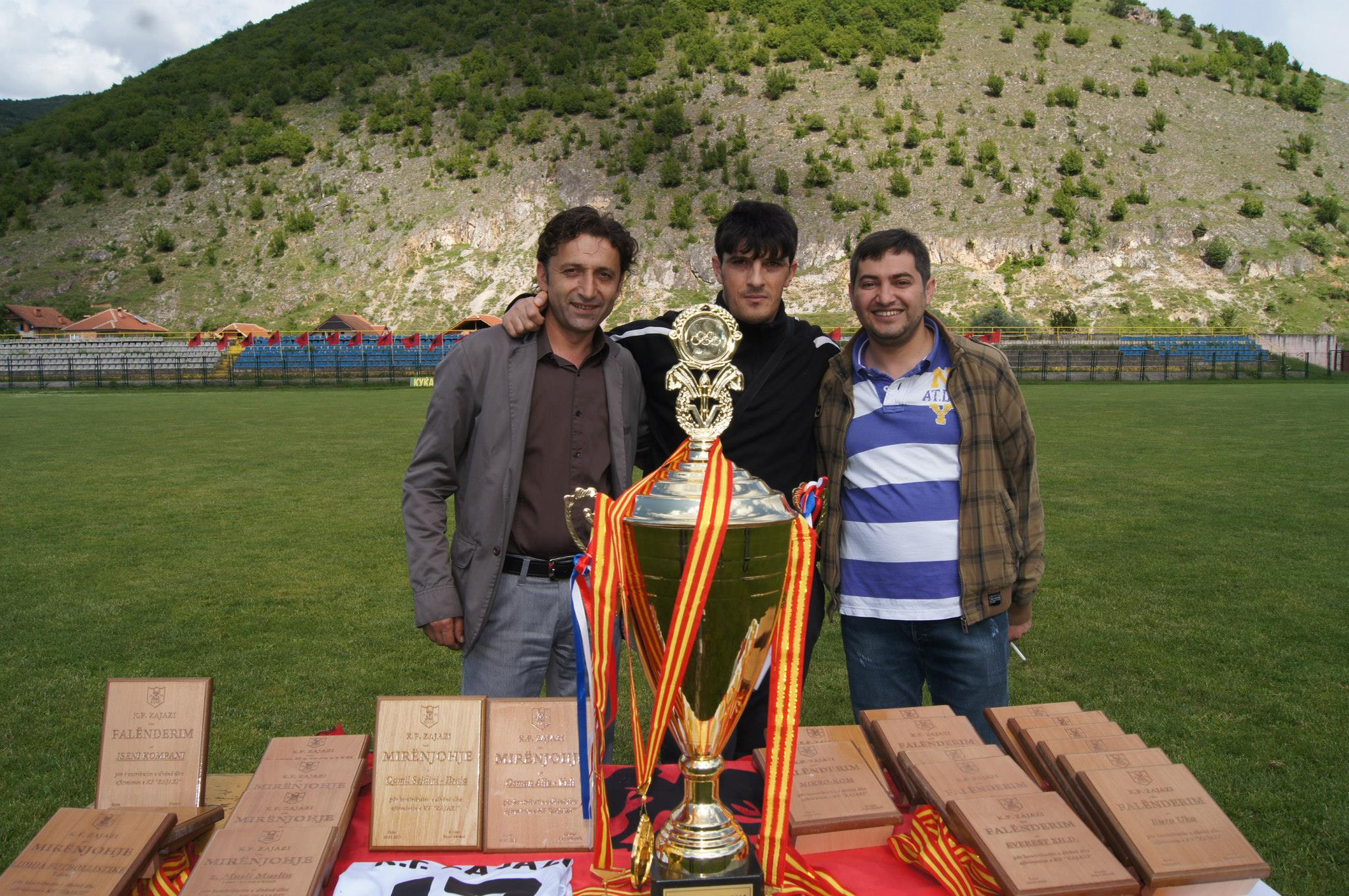
KF Zajazi's title celebrations 2012–2013

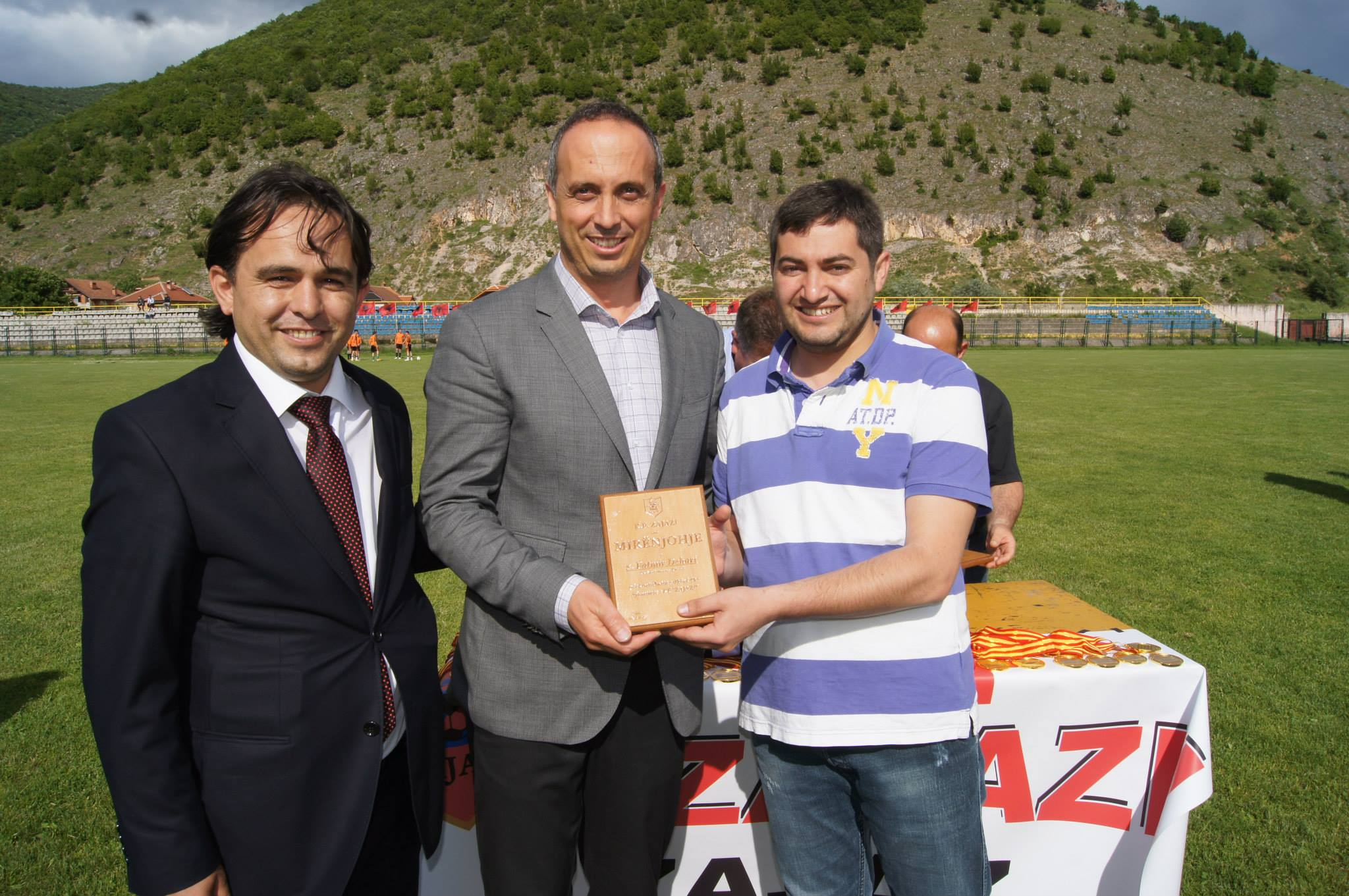
Chairman Mr. Bujar Ahmedi giving a Gratitude to the Mayor of Kërçova, Mr.Fatmir Dehari Mayor: Fatmir Dehari (middle), Chairman: Bujar Ahmedi (right)

It was the 2011–12 season when they showed a positive spark again, when a number of the club's youth products, such as: Buletin Xheladini, Kastriot Jonuzi, Osman Ismaili, Dardan Xheladini, Shqiprim Asani, Flamur Osmani etc. managed to win most of their home games, but their lack of experience showed in important away games, which gave them no chance for putting a serious bid for a promotion to the Macedonian Second Football League. But it was a huge success for a team with an average age of below 20 years and with serious financial problems.

It was the 2012–13 season which put KF Zajazi on the football map again. With the reconstruction of the club board and with the appointment of Bujar Ahmedi as the new chairman of the club, KF Zajazi had bright times ahead of them.

The appointment of Bujar Ahmedi as the new chairman of the club soon proved to have been a positive development for the club. As the young chairman had a clear idea where he wanted the club to be, and that was the Macedonian Second Football League. He wasted no time in pursuing his goal. He soon began the reconstruction of the team, although he truly recognized and appreciated all the youth potential the team had, he also strongly believed that they lacked experience. So his search for experienced and talented players began. Bujar Ahmedi's first signing was Jetmir Kadriu, an experienced midfielder, who had previously paid his trade in the Macedonian First Football League and Macedonian Second Football League, with city rivals FK Vlazrimi. With Jetmir Kadriu being considered as a local football hero to both KF Vlazrimi's and Kf Zajazi fans, the chairman had made a very important signing, by acquiring a key player who became a valuable asset to the club. The other two most notable acquirement were Oliver Askov, an experienced defender brought from the other city rival FK Napredok; and he also brought back to the team former KF Zajazi youth product Vullnet Mustafa. He also brought to the team Lulzim Tairi and Mergim Dani, who very soon emerged as key players for the team.

With the youth potential of Buletin Xheladini, Osman Ismaili, Dardan Xheladini, Lulzim Tairi and Mergim Dani under the guidance and the leadership of Jetmir Kadriu, Oliver Askov and Vullnet Mustafa, KF Zajazi had found a new combination on the football field.

But there were still a lot of financial difficulties which the new appointed chairman, Bujar Ahmedi, managed to settle in a very short period of time. With all these new changes, now, KF Zajazi from an outsider managed to being named by experts as the main favorite for winning the Macedonian Third League – West and gaining promotion to the Macedonian Second Football League. Their biggest rivals were thought to be, again, their city rivals FK Vlazrimi. But this time it was a different story from the one 11 years ago, as KF Zajazi beat their rivals in an away match in the 4th round, thus gaining a clear 6 points advantage. This advantage soon increased, as KF Zajazi emerged absolute favorites of winning the league. Kf Zajazi created a big advantage towards the other teams and managed to lift the Trophy very early in the season, with a lot of games remaining.

=== Promotion 2012–2013 ===
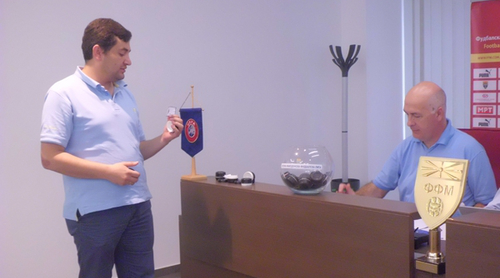
Chairman Bujar Ahmedi drawing the opponent for the 2012–13 playoff

The club's major success was achieved in the season 2012–13 when they won the Macedonian Third League – West. Finishing first in the Macedonian Third League – West; gave them the right to compete in the play-offs for a promotion to the Macedonian Second Football League. In the play off game they were drawn against FK Babi Stip (Macedonian: ФК Баби). A match which they won 1–0 and got promoted to the Macedonian Second Football League for the first time in their history. The game against FK Babi Stip was a very intense one, with KF Zajazi clearly being the better team during all the match, but they failed to capitalize the changes they created. It needed an 84th-minute header from Mergim Dani, following a cross from Lulzim Tairi to put the match to sleep and send KF Zajazi to the Second Macedonian Football League.

The 2013–14 season began in the same fashion as one year ago. New players were brought to the team the most notable one being the signing of Ismail Ismaili, a former international for the Macedonian National Team. They also brought the young star of city rivals, FK Vlazrimi, Florian Kadriu. Ismail Ismaili and Florian Kadriu, along with a couple of other signings were great additions, who added quality and depth in the team. But the season didn't began as everybody expected, after a disappointing preseason, followed a tough draw in the opening games of the season, KF Zajazi was scheduled to play their first to matches away which they both lost. KF Zajazi managed only to take one point in a home match against FK Drita, which was followed by a defeat in the hands of FK Skopje. But KF Zajazi bounced back, with a well deserved home victory against FK Lokomotiva Skopje. KF Zajazi continued their terrible away record with a defeat against FK Miravci. After that they recorded the second win in a row at home against FK 11 Oktomvri. Currently KF Zajazi sit on the 12th position of the Macedonian Second Football League.

== Honours ==
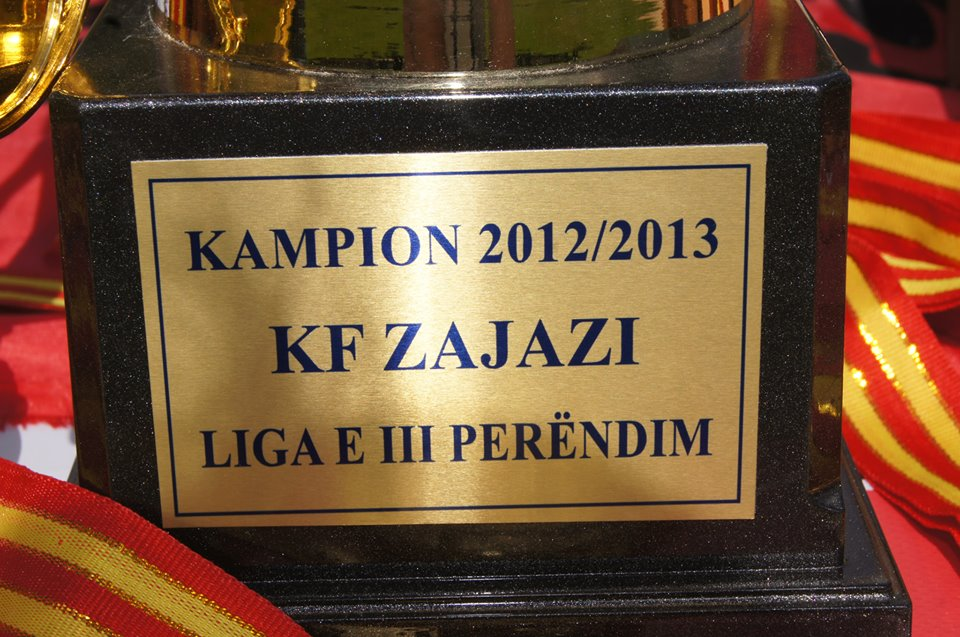
2012–13 Champions Trophy

(North Macedonia) Macedonian Third League - West:

- Winners (2): 2012–13, 2014–15

== Rivalry ==
Being a club with a strong Albanian background, Zajazi has rivalry with most of the Macedonian football clubs. However, the biggest rivalry is with FK Napredok. KF Zajazi has a very intense rivalry with the other Albanian football club in Kicevo FK Vlazrimi.

The intense rivalry with FK Vlazrimi began since the time the clubs were founded in 1977. The rivalry got more fierce in the season 2001–02 when both teams were fighting for becoming champions of the Third Macedonian Football League -West and for a promotion to the Macedonian Second Football League. The season was so close that both teams ended on the top of the table with equal number of points and it was required an extra match between them in order to decide which team will get promoted.

The rivalry was revived again in the 2012–13 season, when FK Vlazrimi emerged as the main opponent to KF Zajazi for winning the league and securing promotion. But this time the race wasn't by far as close as the one eleven years before, as KF Zajazi finished top of the table, leading by double figure number of points ahead of the second placed team and FK Vlazrimi had a disappointing season and finished in the mid table.

== Training facility ==
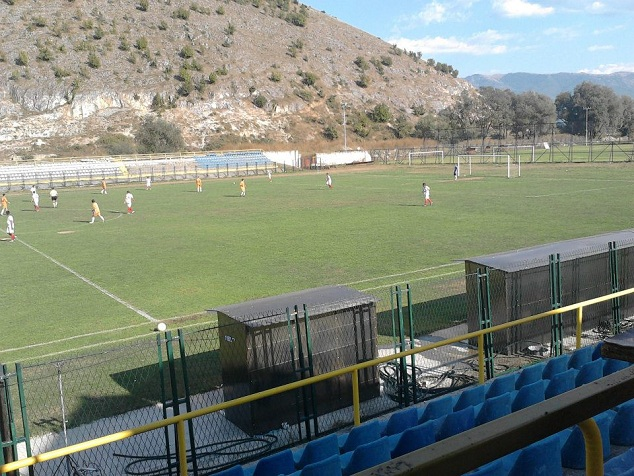
Venue: Gradski stadion Kicevo City Stadium Kicevo Capacity: 5,000

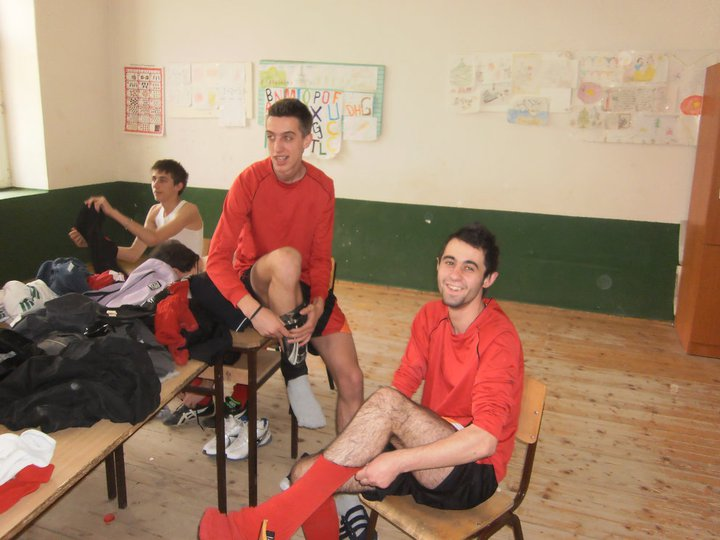
KF Zajazi dressing room Before a match in the 2011–12 season Dardan Xheladini (left), Buletin Xheladini (middle), Kastriot Jonuzi (right)

Since their foundation KF Zajazi have used different locations as their stadiums and as their training facilities, but currently KF Zajazi are using the City Stadium Kičevo as their main stadium and the City Stadium of Kicevo facilities as their training ground. KF Zajazi stadium and training facilities are located in Kičevo which is a town in the west part of the Republic of Macedonia.

KF Zajazi training facilities, for both the professional and the Junior Team, are located near at the City Stadium of Kicevo. There are two grass pitches. These pitches are also used by the Youth academy of KF Zajazi which trains young talents of different age from the town of Kërçova and the villages near.

City Stadium Kicevo is a multi-purpose stadium in Kicevo, Republic of Macedonia. It is currently used mostly for football matches and is currently the home stadium of KF Zajazi, FK Napredok and sometimes also to FK Vlazrimi, but FK Vlazrimi mainly uses its own court for their games. The stadium holds 5,000 people.

== Players ==
=== First-team squad ===
As of 18 August 2017

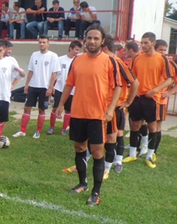
Jetmir Kadriu, 2013–14 season

Note: Flags indicate national team as defined under FIFA eligibility rules; some limited exceptions apply. Players may hold more than one non-FIFA nationality.

| No. | Pos. | Nation | Player |
|---|---|---|---|
| 1 | GK | MKD | Vullnet Mustafa (Captain) |
| 12 | GK | MKD | Muharrem Adili |
| 2 | DF | MKD | Lulzim Tairi |
| 3 | DF | MKD | Oliver Askov |
| 5 | DF | MKD | Buletin Xheladini (Vice-Captain) |
| 6 | DF | MKD | Liridon Ramadani |
| 14 | DF | MKD | Mehmet Cupi |
| 15 | DF | MKD | Filip Gjorgjioski |
| 16 | DF | MKD | Vlorian Ismaili |
| 17 | DF | MKD | Flamur Osmani |
| 23 | DF | MKD | Xhevat Shaqiri |
| 25 | DF | MKD | Gentian Aliu |

| No. | Pos. | Nation | Player |
|---|---|---|---|
| 4 | MF | MKD | Shqiprim Asani |
| 8 | MF | MKD | Jetmir Kadriu (Vice-Captain) |
| 10 | MF | MKD | Mergim Dani |
| 18 | MF | MKD | Valmir Sefa |
| 19 | MF | MKD | Belul Nebiu |
| 20 | MF | MKD | Dardan Xheladini |
| 21 | MF | MKD | Skender Nebija |
| 22 | MF | MKD | Shqiprim Rufati |
| 7 | FW | MKD | Valdet Osmani |
| 9 | FW | MKD | Ismail Ismaili |
| 11 | FW | MKD | Florian Kadriu |
| 13 | FW | MKD | Ylber Aliji |

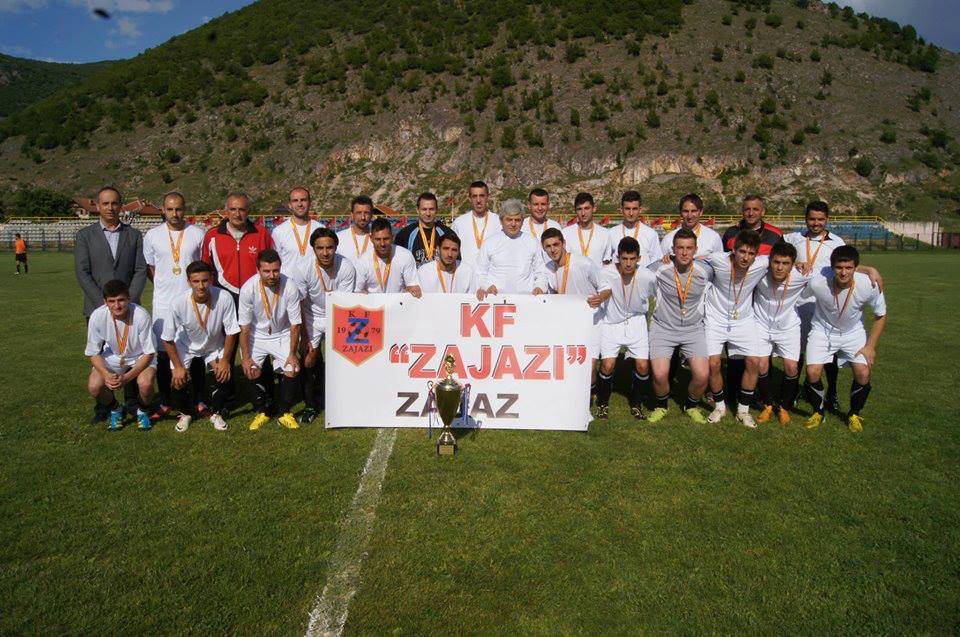
KF Zajazi Champions Squad with Mr. Ali Ahmeti

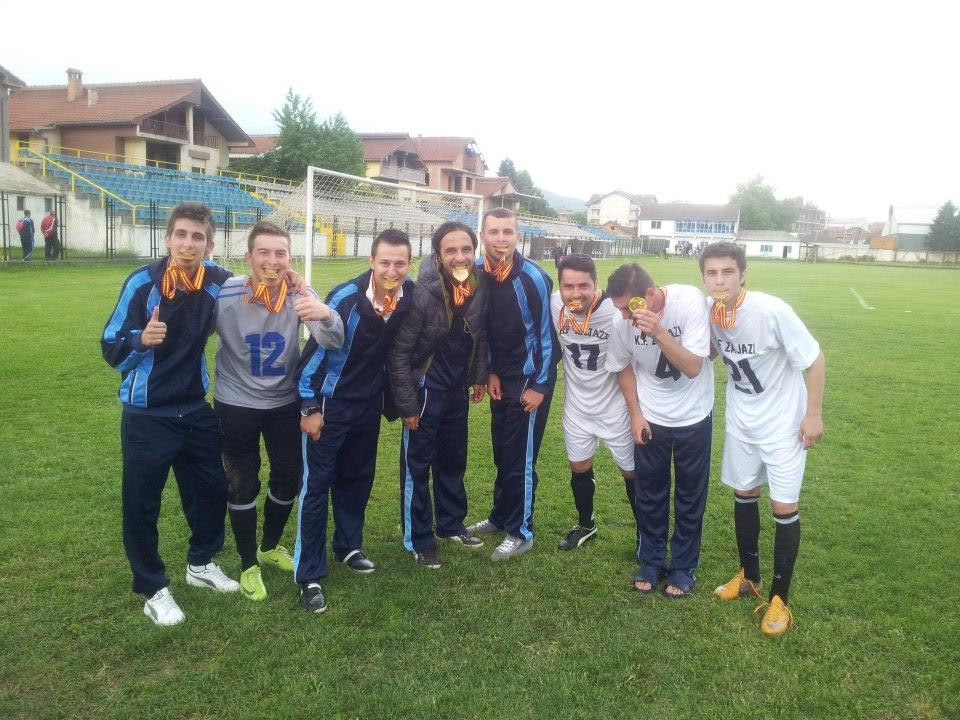
KF Zajazi Players Celebrating Champions Title

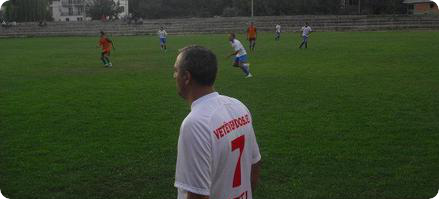
KF Zajazi 2011–2012 Match Field(orange kit): Kastriot Jonuzi (left), Osman Ismaili (right)

== Supporters ==
KF Zajazi supporters are known as Uskana Eagles.

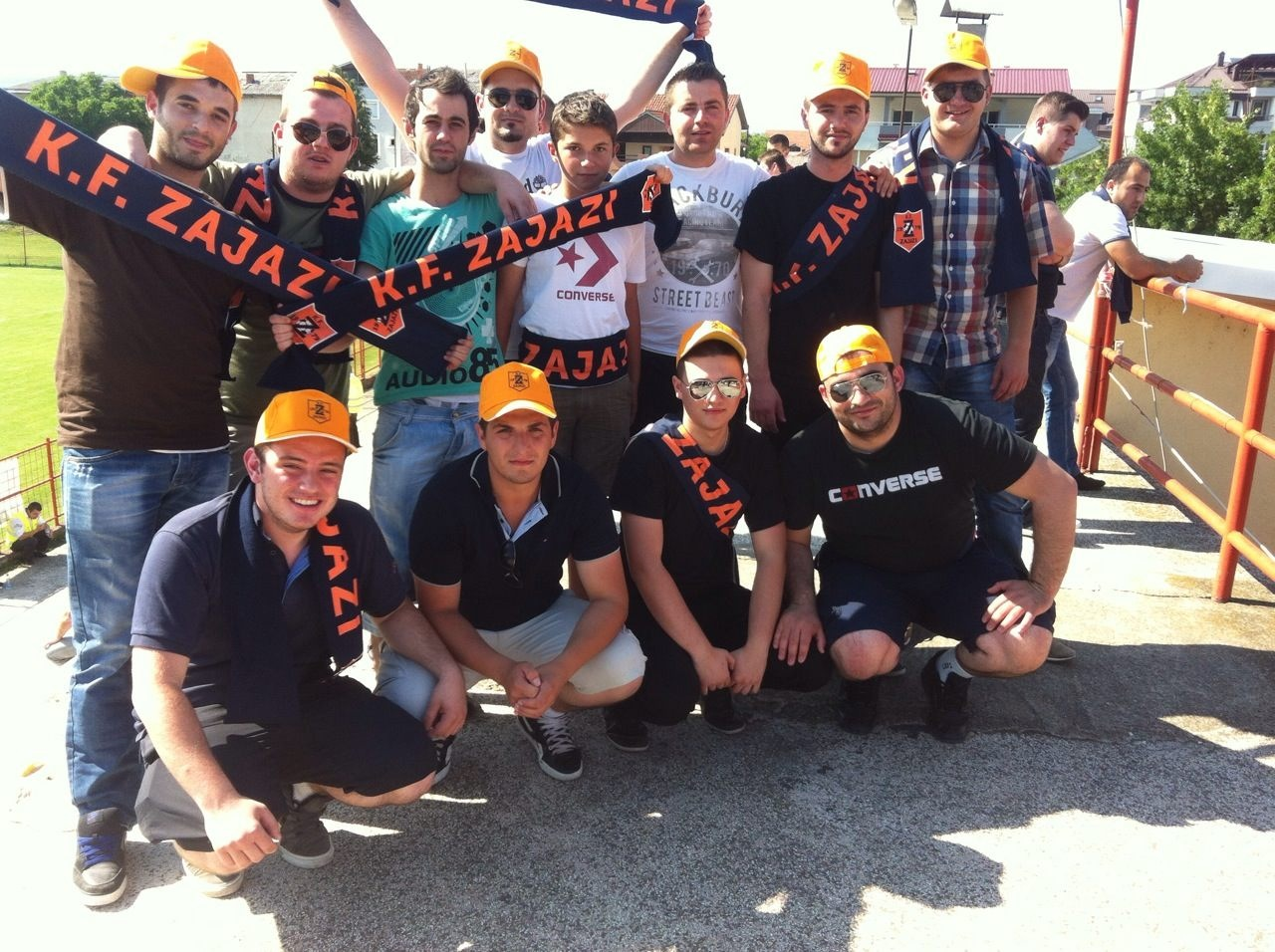
KF Zajazi fans during the play off match against FK Babi

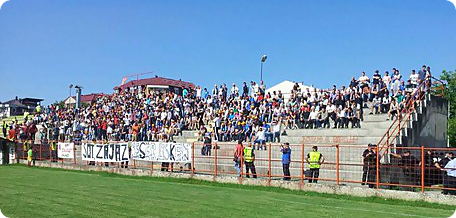
KF Zajazi fans during the play off match against FK Babi
