= Mexhit Neziri =

Association football player

Personal information
- Full name: Mexhit Neziri
- Date of birth: 2 September 1990 (age 36)
- Place of birth: Tetovo, SR Macedonia, SFR Yugoslavia
- Height: 1.81 m (5 ft 11 1/2 in)
- Position: Right back

Team information
- Current team: Ferizaj
- Number: 18

Senior career*
Years	Team	Apps	(Gls)
2010–2013	Shkendija	67	(0)
2013–2015	Renova	58	(3)
2015–2016	Dacia	16	(0)
2016–2018	Renova	66	(4)
2018–2019	Ventspils	21	(0)
2019–2022	Shkendija	76	(1)
2023–2024	Struga	44	(1)
2024–2025	Besa	31	(2)
2025–	Ferizaj	31	(0)
- * Club domestic league appearances and goals as of 22 June 2026

Mexhit Neziri (Macedonian: Меџит Незири, Albanian: Mexhit Neziri, born 2 September 1990) is a Macedonian football defender who plays for Ferizaj.

== Honours ==
=== Club ===
Shkëndija

- First Macedonian Football League: 2010–11
- Macedonian Super Cup (1): 2011

Struga

- Macedonian First Football League: 2023–24,
