= Vrapčište =

Vrapčište Врапчиште Vrapçisht Vrapçişte
- Village
- Location within North Macedonia
- Coordinates: 41°50′02″N 20°53′07″E
- Country: North Macedonia
- Region: Polog
- Municipality: Vrapčište

Population (2021)
  - Total: 4,003
- Time zone: UTC+1 (CET)
  - Summer (DST): UTC+2 (CEST)
- Vehicle registration: GV
- Website: .

Vrapčište (Macedonian: Врапчиште, Turkish: Vrapçişte, Albanian: Vrapçisht) is a village and seat of the municipality of Vrapčište, North Macedonia.

== History ==
Vrapčište is attested in the 1467/68 Ottoman tax registry (defter) for the Nahiyah of Kalkandelen. The village had a total of 240 Christian households, two widows and 17 bachelors.

According to the 1467-68 Ottoman defter, Vrapčište exhibits predominantly Orthodox Christian Slavic and minority Albanian anthroponyms.

According to the Bulgarian ethnographer Vasil Kanchov in 1900, the village of Vrapčište (Vrapchista) was inhabited by 1300 Turks, 325 Christian Bulgarians, 165 Muslim Albanians and 50 Romani.

== Demographics ==
As of the 2021 census, Vrapčište had 4,003 residents with the following ethnic composition:

- Turks 2,765
- Albanians 912
- Persons for whom data are taken from administrative sources 203
- Macedonians 118
- Others 5

According to the 2002 census, the village had a total of 4,874 inhabitants. Ethnic groups in the village include:

- Turks 2,899
- Albanians 1,777
- Macedonians 172
- Others 26

== Sports ==
Local football club FK Vrapčište plays in the OFS Gostivar league. Besart Abdurahimi is originally from Vrapčište.
