= Miletino =

Miletino Милетино Miletinë
- Village
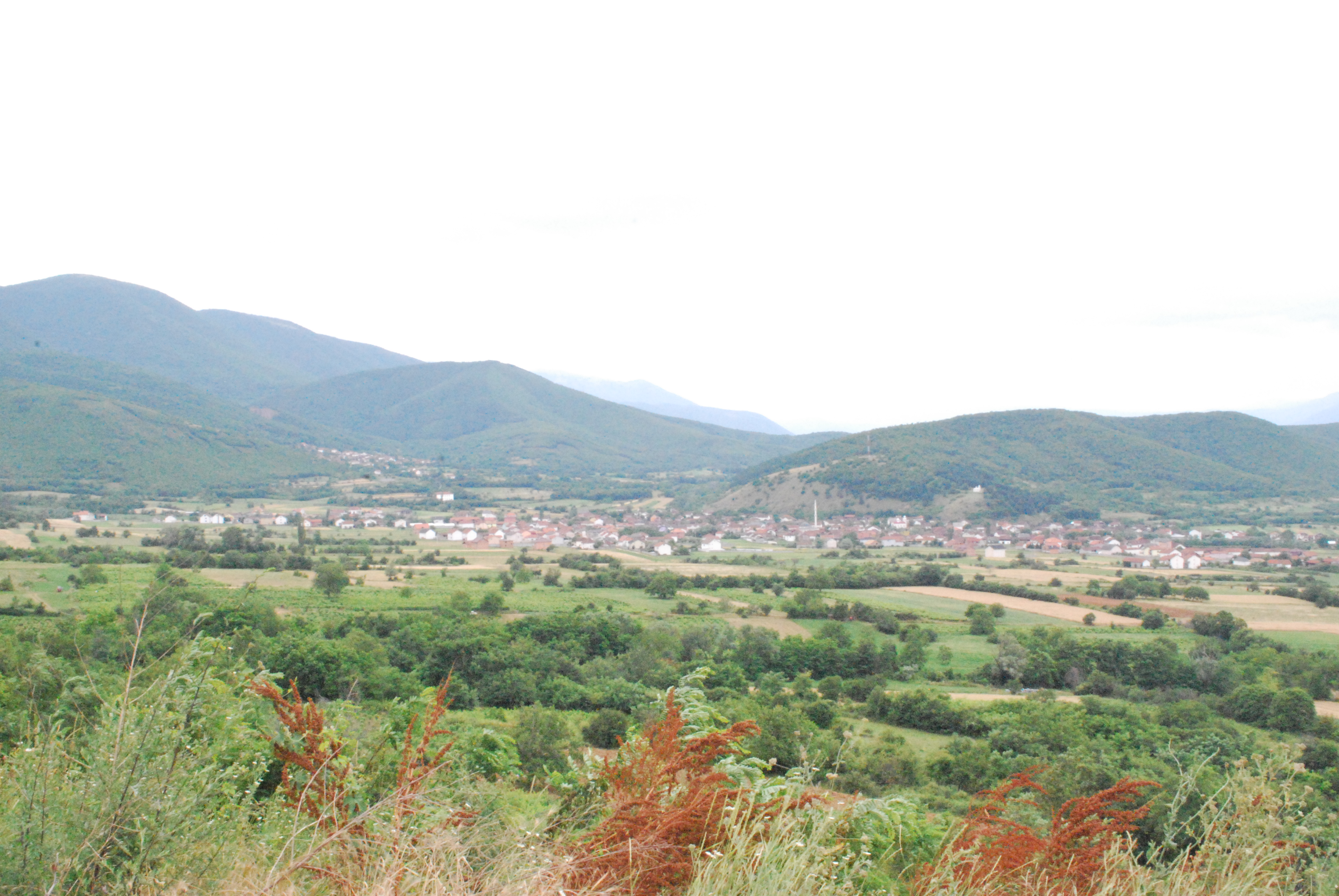

- Location within North Macedonia
- Coordinates: 41°54′N 21°01′E
- Country: North Macedonia
- Region: Polog
- Municipality: Brvenica

Population (2021)
  - Total: 1,674
- Time zone: UTC+1 (CET)
  - Summer (DST): UTC+2 (CEST)
- Car plates: TE
- Website: .

Miletino (Macedonian: Милетино, Albanian: Miletinë) is a village in the municipality of Brvenica, North Macedonia.

== History ==
Miletino is attested in the 1467/68 Ottoman tax registry (defter) for the Nahiyah of Kalkandelen. The village had a total of 145 Christian households, 7 bachelors and 6 widows.

According to the 1467-68 Ottoman defter, Miletino exhibits a mixture of Orthodox Christian Slavic and Albanian anthroponyms.

== Demographics ==
As of the 2021 census, Miletino had 1,674 residents with the following ethnic composition:

- Albanians 1,105
- Macedonians 501
- Persons for whom data are taken from administrative sources 64
- Others 4

According to the 2002 census, the village had a total of 1,986 inhabitants.

Ethnic groups in the village include:

- Albanians – 1,336
- Macedonians – 642
- Serbs – 2
- Others – 6

According to the 1942 Albanian census, Miletino was inhabited by 637 Serbs, 603 Muslim Albanians and 16 Bulgarians.

In statistics gathered by Vasil Kanchov in 1900, the village of Miletino (Meletino) was inhabited by 200 Christian Bulgarians and 135 Muslim Albanians.

== Sports ==
Local football club KF Rrufeja plays in the OFS Tetovo league.
