= FK Vrapčište =

Football club in Macedonia

- Full name: Futbol Kulübü Vrapčište
- Founded: 1958
- Ground: Vrapčište StadArena
- Capacity: 2,000
- Chairman: İlami Hasipi
- Manager: Ekrem Mehmet
- League: Macedonian Third League (West)
- 2018–19: OFL Gostivar, 2nd
Home colours	Away colours

FK Vrapčište (Macedonian: ФК Врапчиште; Albanian: KF Vrapçisht) is a football club based in the village of Vrapčište, near Gostivar, Republic of Macedonia. They are currently competing in the Macedonian Third League (West Division).

== History ==
The club was founded in 1958.

It used the name FK Murgovec until 2011.

== List of managers ==
- (North Macedonia) (Albania) Xhengis Rexhepi (1 January 2013 – 30 June 2014)
