= Brvenica, North Macedonia =

Brvenica Брвеница
- Village
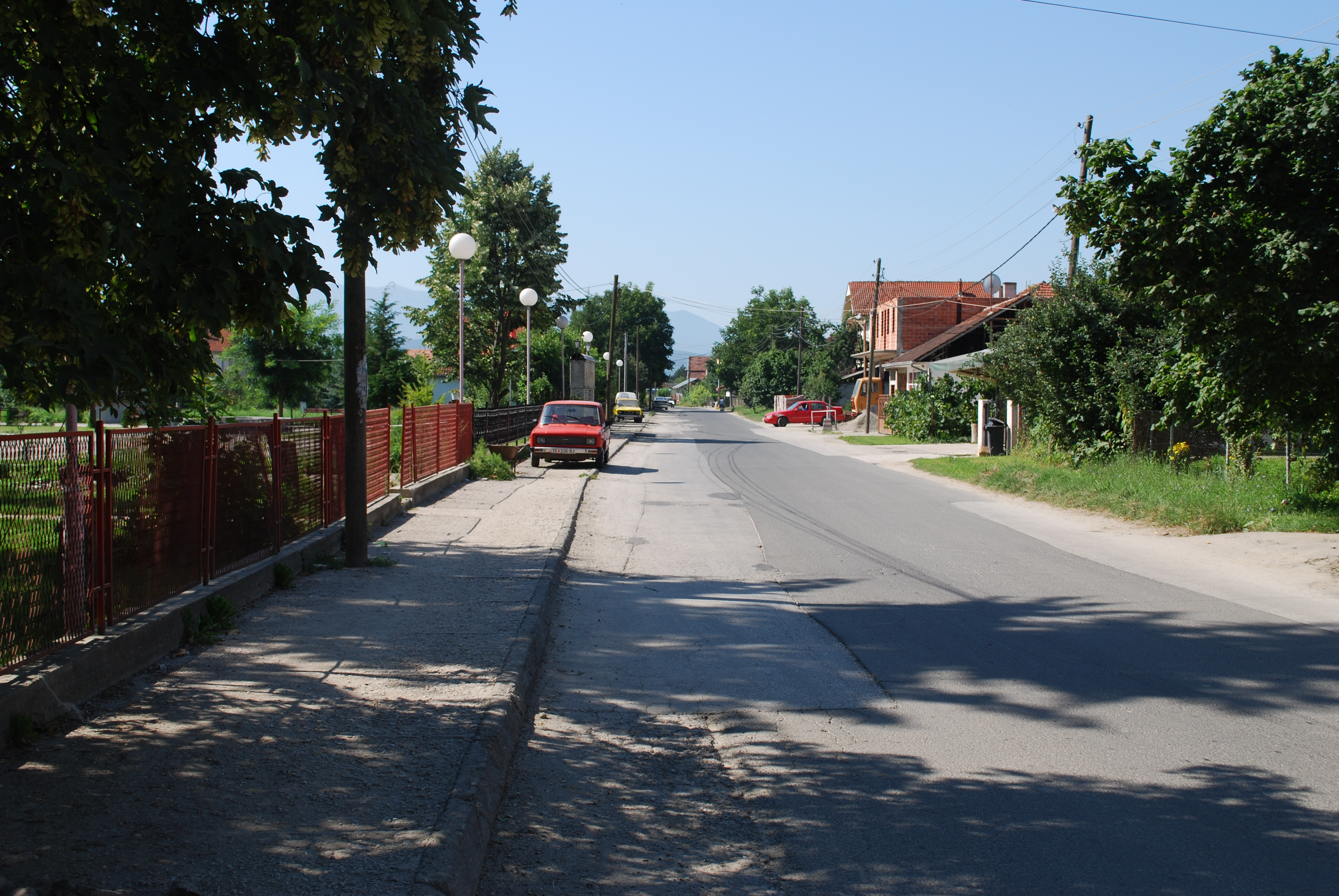

- Coat of arms

- Location in Brvenica Municipality

- Location within North Macedonia
- Country: North Macedonia
- Region: Polog
- Municipality: Brvenica

Area
  - Total: 164.30 km^{2} (63.44 sq mi)

Population (2021)
  - Total: 3,102
  - Density: 18.88/km^{2} (48.90/sq mi)
- Time zone: UTC+1 (CET)
- Postal code: 1216
- Area code: 044
- Vehicle registration: TE
- Website: Official Website

Brvenica (Macedonian: Брвеница) is a village in the municipality of Brvenica, North Macedonia. It is the seat of the Brvenica Municipality.

== History ==
Brvenica is attested in the 1467/68 Ottoman tax registry (defter) for the Nahiyah of Kalkandelen. The village had a total of 100 Christian households, three bachelors and three widows.

In statistics gathered by Vasil Kanchov in 1900, the village of Brvenica was inhabited by 105 Christian Bulgarians.

== Demographics ==
As of the 2021 census, Brvenica had 3,102 residents with the following ethnic composition:

- Macedonians 2,973
- Serbs 37
- Persons for whom data are taken from administrative sources 68
- Others 24

According to the 2002 census, the village had a total of 2,981 inhabitants.

Ethnic groups in the village include:

- Macedonians 2,893
- Serbs 21
- Albanians 2
- Others 2
