= FK Babi =

- Full name: Fudbalski klub Babi Štip
- Nickname(s): Бабите (The Grandmothers)
- Founded: 1994
- Ground: City Stadium Štip
- Capacity: 4,000
- Chairman: Vane Arsov
- Manager: Grozde Kuzmanov
- League: Macedonian Third League (East)
- 2014–15: 9th
| Home colours | Away colours |

FK Babi (Macedonian: ФК Баби) is a football club based in the city of Štip, Republic of Macedonia. They currently play in the Macedonian Third League.

== History ==
The club was founded in 1994.
