= FK Korzo =

ФК Корзо FK Korzo
- Full name: Fudbalski Klub Korzo Prilep
- Founded: 1972
- Ground: Stadion Mogila
- League: OFS Prilep B
- 2023–24: 8th
Home colours	Away colours

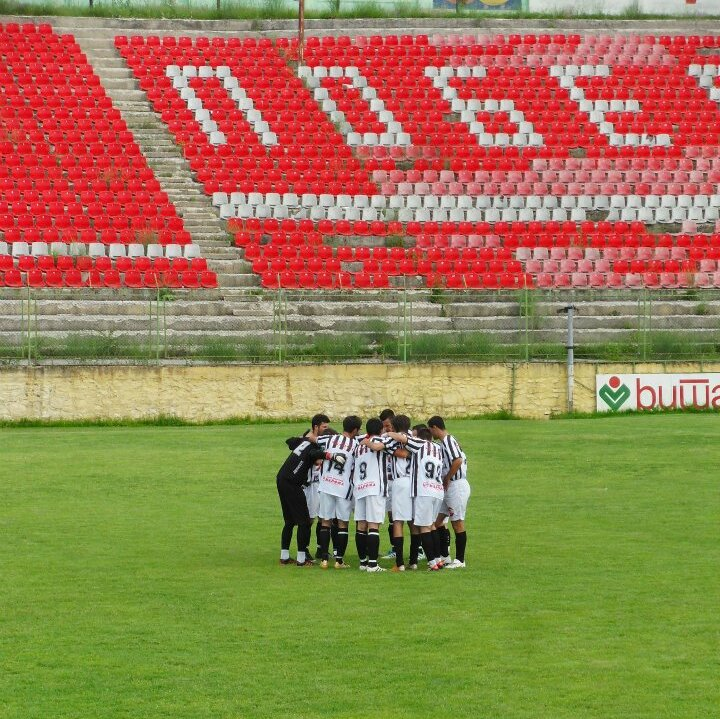
FK Korzo after winning a match

FK Korzo (Macedonian: ФК Корзо) is a football club based in the city of Prilep, North Macedonia. They currently play in the OFS Prilep B league.

== History ==
The club was founded in 1972.

FK Korzo is short for the Prilep settlement Staro Korzo. The club was re-established in the summer of 2007. It went up two tiers in just two years and after winning the Regional A and B Leagues they qualified for the Macedonian Third League. In June 2012 after beating the guest Vardar Negotino with 5–1 Korzo qualified for the Macedonian Second League.
