= Mile Krstev =

Macedonian footballer (born 1979)

Milorad Krstev
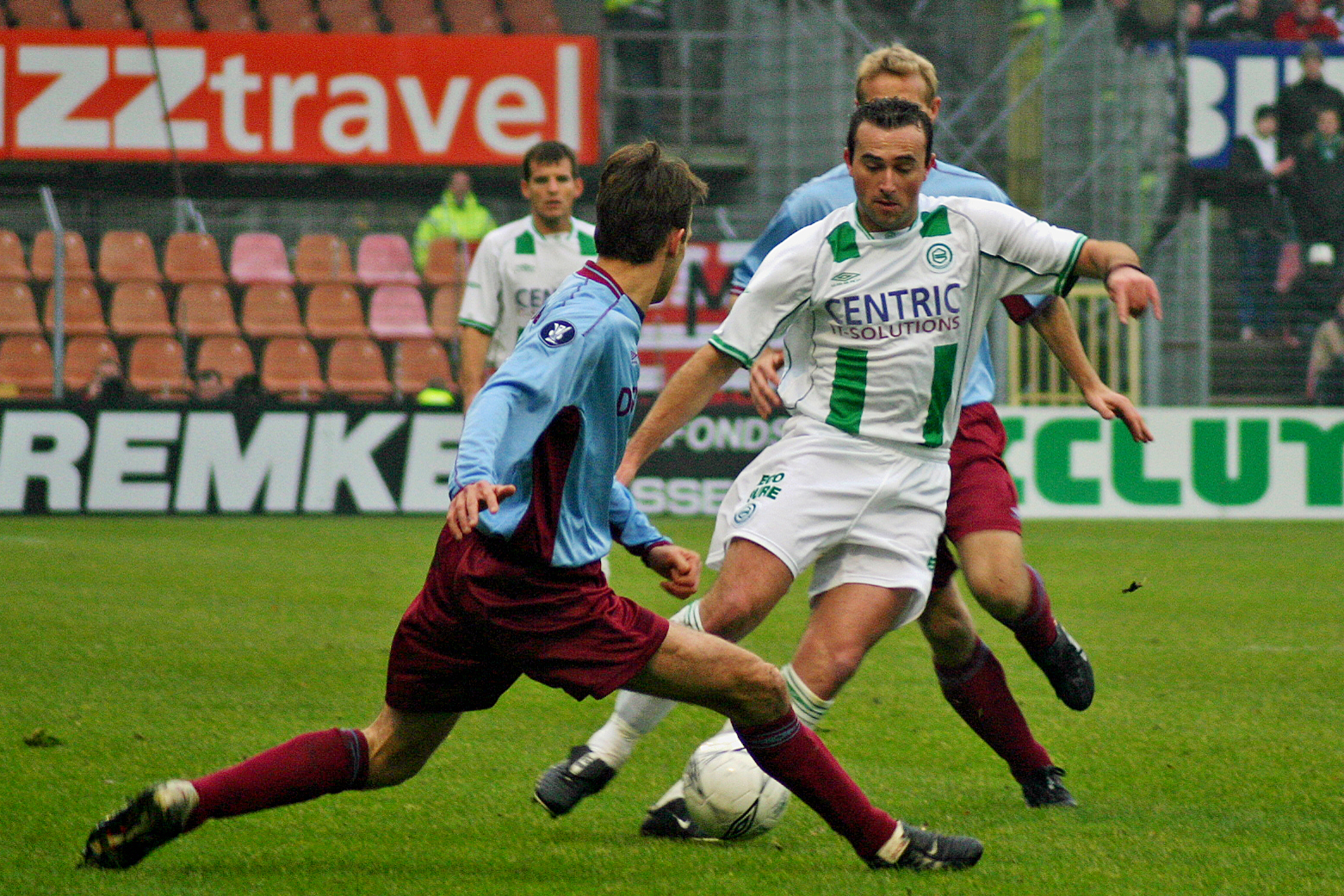

Personal information
- Date of birth: 13 May 1979 (age 47)
- Place of birth: Negotino, SFR Yugoslavia
- Height: 1.81 m (5 ft 11 in)
- Position: Midfielder

Senior career*
Years	Team	Apps	(Gls)
1996–1997	Pobeda	0	(0)
1997–1998	Athinaikos	13	(0)
1998–2001	Heerenveen	21	(0)
2001	Veendam	9	(4)
2001–2005	Groningen	82	(7)
2005–2008	Veendam	65	(8)
2008–2009	Pobeda	19	(8)
2009–2016	Metalurg Skopje	165	(43)
Total		374	(70)

International career
1996–2005	Macedonia	22	(2)
- * Club domestic league appearances and goals

Milorad 'Mile' Krstev (born 13 May 1979) is a Macedonian former professional footballer who played as a midfielder. He played for the Macedonia national team internationally.

== International career ==
Krstev made his senior debut for Republic of Macedonia in a November 1996 friendly match away against Malta and has earned a total of 22 caps, scoring 2 goals. His final international was a June 2005 FIFA World Cup qualification match against the Czech Republic.
