= Stadion Bogovinje =

Stadium in North Macedonia

Coordinates: 41°26′15″N 22°46′8″E

Stadium Bogovinje (Albanian: Stadiumi i Bogovinës) is a multi-purpose stadium in the village Bogovinje near Tetovo, North Macedonia. It is used mostly for football matches and is currently the home stadium of KF Drita Bogovinë. The stadium holds 2,500 people.
