= Bogovinje =

Bogovinje Боговиње Bogovinë
- Village
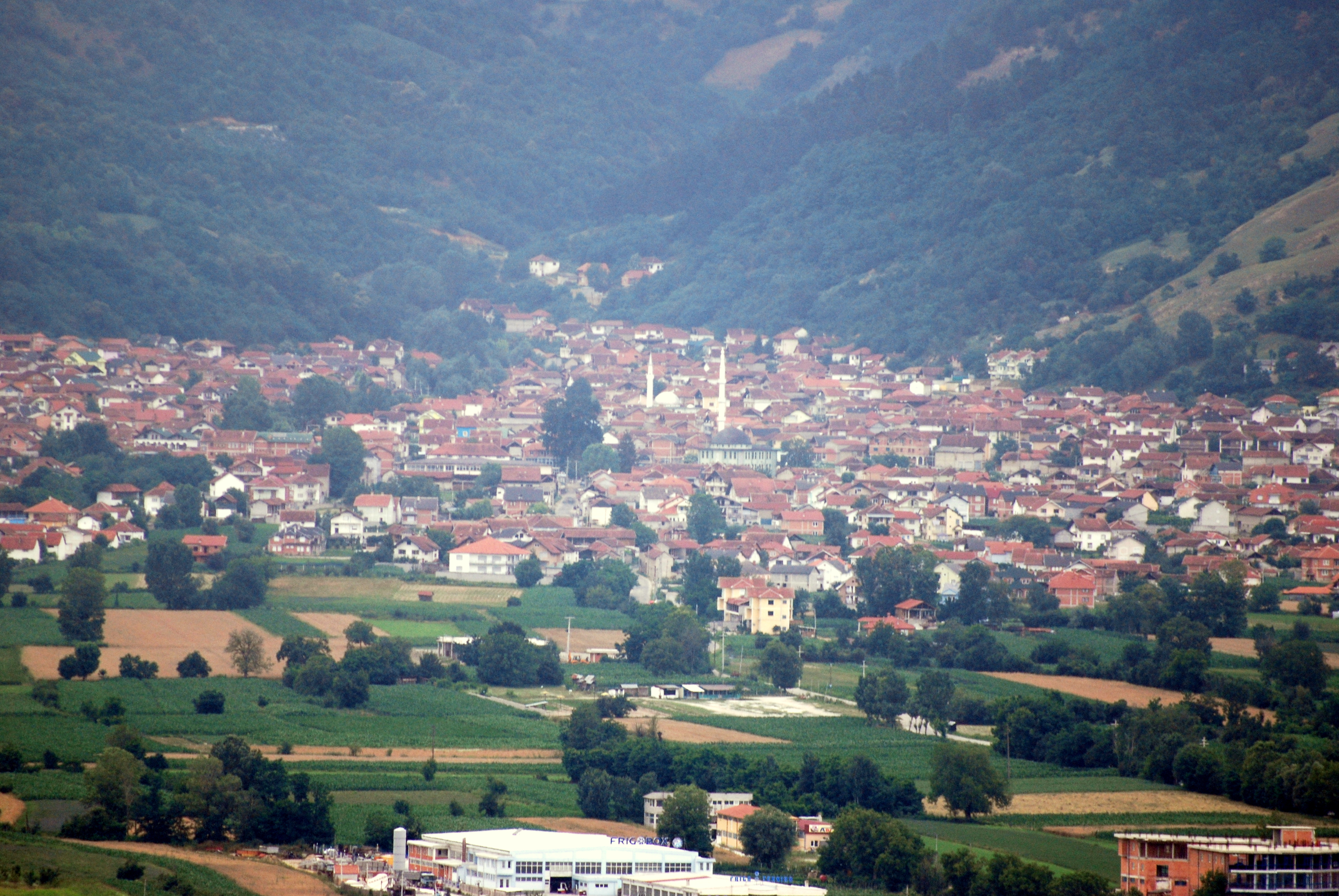
- View of the village

- Location within North Macedonia
- Coordinates: 41°55′24″N 20°54′48″E
- Country: North Macedonia
- Region: Polog
- Municipality: Bogovinje

Government
  - mayor: Feti Abazi (VLEN)
- Elevation: 503 m (1,650 ft)

Population (2021)
  - Total: 5,239
- Time zone: UTC+1 (CET)
  - Summer (DST): UTC+2 (CEST)
- Postal code: 1220
- Vehicle registration: TE

Bogovinje (Macedonian: Боговиње; Albanian: Bogovinë) is a village in the municipality of Bogovinje, North Macedonia. It is a seat of the Bogovinje municipality.

== History ==
Bogovinje is attested in the 1467/68 Ottoman tax registry (defter) for the Nahiyah of Kalkandelen. The village had a total of 42 Christian households, 2 bachelors and 1 widow.

According to the 1467-68 Ottoman defter, Bogovinje exhibits a majority Orthodox Christian Slavic anthroponomy, alongside a minority of names belonging to the Albanian onomastic sphere.

== Sports ==
The village also has a stadium home to FK Drita called Stadion Bogovinje.

== Demographics ==
As of the 2021 census, Bogovinje had 5,239 residents with the following ethnic composition:

- Albanians 4,829
- Persons for whom data are taken from administrative sources 405
- Macedonians 1
- Others 4

According to the 2002 census, the village had a total of 6,328 inhabitants. Ethnic groups in the village include:

- Albanians 6,273
- Macedonians 1
- Romani 5
- Others 49

According to the 1942 Albanian census, Bogovinje was inhabited by 2,023 Muslim Albanians.

According to the Bulgarian scientific expedition during the First World War, Bogovinje was inhabited by 1,188 Pomaks.

According to the Bulgarian ethnographer Vasil Kanchov in 1900, the village of Bogovinje was inhabited by 600 Muslim Albanians.
