= KF Rrufeja =

ФК Руфеја KF Rrufeja
- Full name: Klubi Futbollistik Rufeja 93 Miletinë
- Founded: 1993; 32 years ago
- Ground: Stadion Miletino
- Capacity: 500
- League: OFS Tetovo
Home colours	Away colours

KF Rrufeja Miletinë (Macedonian: ФК Руфеја Милетино, romanized: FK Rufeja Miletino) is a football club based in the village of Miletinë, Brvenica Municipality, North Macedonia. They are currently competing in the OFS Tetovo league.

== History ==
The club was founded in 1993.
