= Gradski stadion Štip =

Multi-purpose stadium in Štip, North Macedonia

Coordinates: 41.737617°N 22.208358°E

Градски стадион Штип City Stadium Štip
- Interactive map of Градски стадион Штип; City Stadium Štip
- Full name: Gradski stadion Štip
- Location: Štip, North Macedonia
- Owner: Štip Municipality
- Capacity: 8,000
- Surface: Grass

Construction
- Renovated: 2016

Tenant
- FK Bregalnica Štip

City Stadium Štip (Macedonian: Градски стадион Штип) is a multi-purpose stadium in Štip, North Macedonia. It is mostly used for football matches and is currently the home stadium of FK Bregalnica Štip. The stadium holds 8,000 people. It will hold maybe over 10,000 people by 2016

On 2 May 2012, for the first time in Macedonian football history, the Gradski stadium in Štip was host of the domestic cup final. In preparation for the event, the board of Bregalnica was fixed up the stadium by painting the fence, renovating the press box, locker rooms and bathrooms.

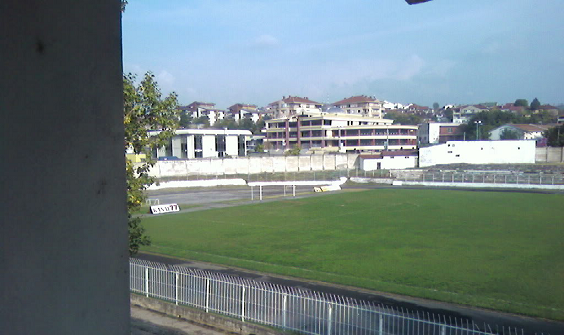
