= KF Drita Bogovinë =

KF Drita
- Full name: Klubi Futbollistik Drita Bogovinë
- Founded: 1994; 32 years ago
- Ground: Stadion Bogovinje
- Capacity: 500
- Manager: Argjend Ramadani
- League: Macedonian Third League (Region 6)
- 2025–26: 7th
Home colours	Away colours

KF Drita Bogovinë (Macedonian: ФК Дрита Боговиње, romanized: FK Drita Bogovinje) is a football club based in Bogovinje, North Macedonia. They are currently competing in the Macedonian Third Football League (Region 6).

== History ==
The club was founded in 1994 under the name Bogovinje (Macedonian: Боговиње).

The biggest success of the club was playing in the Macedonian First League in the 2012–13 season, after the promotion from the Macedonian Second League. Drita was relegated after the play-off against FK Gorno Lisiče which was ended in the 70th minute after the players of Drita left the ground because they were disappointed with the referee's decisions.

== Honours ==
Macedonian Second League:

- Runners-up (1): 2011–12

== Current squad ==
Note: Flags indicate national team as defined under FIFA eligibility rules; some limited exceptions apply. Players may hold more than one non-FIFA nationality.

No.	Pos.	Nation	Player
3	DF	MKD	Muharem Mislimi
4	DF	MKD	Faton Rexhepi
5	DF	MKD	Amir Aliu
9		MKD	Vildan Islami
10		MKD	Arsim Ramadani
7	MF	MKD	Lirim Beshiri
11	MF	MKD	Betim Miftari
13	GK	MKD	Vulnet Islami
14		MKD	Premtim Jakupi
15		MKD	Bekim Ferati
16		MKD	Ardit Zeqiri
17		MKD	Besim Alili
19		MKD	Agron Shefiti
