= 2010–11 Macedonian Football Cup =

Tournament details
- Country: Macedonia
- Dates: 18 August 2010 – 24 May 2011
- Teams: 32

Final positions
- Champions: Metalurg (1st title)
- Runners-up: Teteks

Tournament statistics
- Matches played: 44
- Goals scored: 106 (2.41 per match)

The 2010–11 Macedonian Football Cup was the 19th season of Macedonia's football knockout competition. Teteks were the defending champions, having won their first title. The 2010–11 champions were Metalurg who won their first title.

== Competition calendar ==
Round	Date(s)	Fixtures	Clubs	New entries
First Round	18 August 2010	16	32 → 16	32
Second Round	15, 28, 29 September & 9, 10 October 2010	16	16 → 8	none
Quarter-finals	20 October & 10 November 2010	8	8 → 4	none
Semi-finals	20 April & 4 May 2011	4	4 → 2	none
Final	24 May 2011	1	2 → 1	none

== First round ==
The draw was held on 7 July 2010 in Skopje. Matches were played on 18 August 2010.

Team 1	Score	Team 2
18 August 2010
Osogovo (3)	6–0	Prevalec (3)
Bregalnica Shtip (1)	3–1	Ohrid Lote (2)
Lokomotiva (2)	1–0	Belasica (2)
Miravci (2)	1–0	Rabotnichki (1)
Ohrid 2004 (2)	0–1	Sileks (1)
Rinia Gostivar (2)	3–0 (w/o)	Milano (3)
Novaci 2005 (2)	2–3	Vardar (1)
11 Oktomvri (2)	2–1	Skopje (1)
Vlaznimi (2)	3–3 (5–4 p)	Shkëndija (1)
Bair Krkardash (3)	1–3	Pelister (1)
Tikvesh (2)	2–1	Drita (2)
Prespa (3)	0–7	Metalurg (1)
Gorno Lisiche (2)	1–1 (1–4 p)	Napredok (1)
Karbinci (3)	0–5	Horizont Turnovo (1)
Kamenica Sasa (3)	1–2	Teteks (1)
Cementarnica 55 (2)	0–1	Renova (1)

== Second round ==
Entering this round are the 16 winners from the First Round. The first legs took place on 15 September 2010 and the second legs took place on 28, 29 September, 9 and 10 October 2010.

Team 1	Agg.	Team 2	1st leg	2nd leg
Napredok (1)	4–2	Vlaznimi (2)	4–0	0–2
Rinia Gostivar (2)	0–4	Horizont Turnovo (1)	0–3	0–1
Bregalnica Shtip (1)	2–0	Pelister (1)	0–0	2–0
Sileks (1)	0–3	Teteks (1)	0–1	0–2
Osogovo (3)	1–3	Tikvesh (2)	0–3	1–0
Lokomotiva (2)	0–0 (4–3 p)	Miravci (2)	0–0	0–0
11 Oktomvri (2)	1–1 (6–7 p)	Metalurg (1)	1–0	0–1
Vardar (1)	2–1	Renova (1)	1–1	1–0

== Quarter-finals ==
The first legs of the quarterfinals took place on 20 October 2010, while the second legs took place on 10 November 2010.

=== Summary ===
Team 1	Agg.	Team 2	1st leg	2nd leg
Lokomotiva (2)	1–4	Metalurg (1)	0–3	1–1
Bregalnica Shtip (1)	0–2	Napredok (1)	0–1	0–1
Horizont Turnovo (1)	1–3	Teteks (1)	1–2	0–1
Vardar (1)	4–5	Tikvesh (2)	4–1	0–4

=== Matches ===
20 October 2010
14:00 CEST

Lokomotiva (2)	0–3	Metalurg (1)
		Dameski 45+1'; M. Krstev 46', 47'

Stadion Lokomotiva, Skopje
10 November 2010
13:00 CET

Metalurg (1)	1–1	Lokomotiva (2)
Ejupi 88'		Shabani 82'

Stadion Zhelezarnica, Skopje

Metalurg won 7–1 on aggregate.

20 October 2010
14:00 CEST

Bregalnica Shtip (1)	0–1	Napredok (1)
		Mihajloski 75'

Gradski stadion, Shtip
10 November 2010
13:00 CET

Napredok (1)	1–0	Bregalnica Shtip (1)
Stepanovski 55' (pen.)

Gradski stadion, Kichevo

Napredok won 2–0 on aggregate.

20 October 2010
14:00 CEST

Horizont Turnovo (1)	1–2	Teteks (1)
Bajlozov 68'		Ristovski 71', 89'

Stadion Kukush, Turnovo
10 November 2010
13:00 CET

Teteks (1)	1–0	Horizont Turnovo (1)
Iseni 41'

Gradski stadion, Tetovo

Teteks won 3–1 on aggregate.

20 October 2010
14:00 CEST

Vardar (1)	4–1	Tikvesh (2)
Gjurgjevikj 8'; Nastevski 10'; Siljanovski 12'; Pandovski 64'		Rangotov 50'

Philip II Arena, Skopje
10 November 2010
13:00 CET

Tikvesh (2)	4–0	Vardar (1)
T. Krstev 16', 52'; Dimov 40'; Stojanovski 73'

Gradski stadion, Kavadarci

Tikvesh won 5–4 on aggregate.

== Semi-finals ==
The first legs of the semi-finals took place on 20 April 2011, while the second legs took place on 4 May 2011.

=== Summary ===
Team 1	Agg.	Team 2	1st leg	2nd leg
Tikvesh (2)	0–6	Teteks (1)	0–0	0–6
Metalurg (1)	2–0	Napredok (1)	0–0	2–0

=== Matches ===
20 April 2011
16:00 CEST

Tikvesh (2)	0−0	Teteks (1)

Gradski stadion, Kavadarci
4 May 2011
16:00 CEST

Teteks (1)	6−0	Tikvesh (2)
Jovanovski 18'; Gligorovski 22', 55'; Lostovski 27' (o.g.); Simovski 69'; Siljanovski 85'

Gradski stadion, Tetovo

Teteks won 6–0 on aggregate.

20 April 2011
16:00 CEST

Metalurg (1)	0−0	Napredok (1)

Stadion Zhelezarnica, Skopje
4 May 2011
16:00 CEST

Napredok (1)	0−2	Metalurg (1)
		Krstev 20'; Tenekedjiev 45'

Gradski stadion, Kichevo

Metalurg won 2–0 on aggregate.

== Final ==
24 May 2011
16:00 CEST

Metalurg (1)	2–0	Teteks (1)
Kostencovski 14'; Tenekedjiev 65'	Report

Stadion Goce Delchev, Prilep
Attendance: 3,000
Referee: Zoran Boshkov (Negotino)

== See also ==
- 2010–11 Macedonian First Football League
- 2010–11 Macedonian Second Football League
- 2010–11 Macedonian Third Football League
