= 2010–11 Macedonian First Football League =

Macedonian First League
- Season: 2010–11
- Dates: 31 July 2010 – 28 May 2011
- Champions: Shkëndija; 1st domestic title
- Relegated: Skopje; Pelister
- Champions League: Shkëndija
- Europa League: Metalurg; Renova; Rabotnichki
- Matches: 180
- Goals: 425 (2.36 per match)
- Top goalscorer: Hristijan Kirovski (16 goals)
- Biggest home win: Renova 5–0 Napredok (27 November 2010); Metalurg 5–0 Pelister (23 April 2011)
- Biggest away win: Pelister 0–5 Renova (16 April 2011); Napredok 0–5 Rabotnichki (16 April 2011)
- Highest scoring: Pelister 5–4 Skopje (11 December 2010)

The 2010–11 Macedonian First League was the 19th season of the Macedonian First Football League, the highest football league of Macedonia. It began on 31 July 2010 and ended on 28 May 2011. Renova were the defending champions having won their first Macedonian championship last season.

The competition was won by Shkëndija, who earned their first overall Macedonian title. FK Skopje and Pelister were relegated to the Second League. Vardar were spared from relegation because of fusion with Miravci.

== Promotion and relegation ==
At the start of the 2010–11 season

Promoted from 2009–10 Second League

- Shkëndija (winners)
- Skopje (runners-up)
- Napredok (Third placed)^{1}
- Bregalnica Shtip (Fourth placed; won play-off match)

Relegated to 2010–11 Second League

- Milano (9th; lost play-off match)
- Makedonija G.P. (10th)^{1}
- Sloga Jugomagnat (11th)^{1}
- Pobeda (12th)^{2}

At the end of the 2010–11 season

Promoted from 2010–11 Second League

- 11 Oktomvri (winners)
- Ohrid (runners-up)
- Miravci (Fourth placed; won play-off match)^{3}

Relegated to 2011–12 Second League

- Skopje (9th; lost play-off match)
- Vardar (11th)^{3}
- Pelister (12th)

1 Makedonija G.P. and Sloga Jugomagnat were expelled from the First League due to boycotting two matches in the season. However, Napredok was directly promoted.
2 Pobeda was expelled from the First League due to the eight-year suspension from FIFA for their involvement in match-fixing scandal.
3 Vardar was initially relegated, but was stayed after was merged with Miravci, which won play-off match against Skopje. Later, the two sides were separated and Miravci were refused a First League licence.

== Participating teams ==
Location of teams in 2010–11 Macedonian First League

| Club | Manager | City | Stadium | Capacity |
|---|---|---|---|---|
| Bregalnica | (North Macedonia) Ilija Mitrov | Shtip | Gradski stadion Shtip | 4,000 |
| Metalurg | (North Macedonia) Zhikica Tasevski | Skopje | Stadion Zhelezarnica | 4,000 |
| Napredok | (North Macedonia) Dragan Bocheski | Kichevo | Gradski stadion Kichevo | 5,000 |
| Pelister | (North Macedonia) Nexhat Husein | Bitola | Stadion Tumbe Kafe | 8,000 |
| Rabotnichki | (North Macedonia) Vlatko Kostov | Skopje | Philip II Arena | 25,000 |
| Renova | (Kosovo) Bylbyl Sokoli | Djepchishte | Gradski stadion Tetovo | 15,000 |
| Sileks | (North Macedonia) Ane Andovski | Kratovo | Stadion Sileks | 5,000 |
| Skopje | (North Macedonia) Ljupcho Markovski | Skopje | Stadion Avtokomanda | 4,000 |
| Shkëndija | (North Macedonia) Qatip Osmani | Tetovo | Gradski stadion Tetovo | 15,000 |
| Teteks | (North Macedonia) Toni Jakimovski | Tetovo | Gradski stadion Tetovo | 15,000 |
| Horizont Turnovo | (North Macedonia) Shefki Arifovski | Turnovo | Stadion Kukush | 1,500 |
| Vardar | (North Macedonia) Zoran Stratev | Skopje | Philip II Arena | 25,000 |

== League table ==
| Pos | Team | Pld | W | D | L | GF | GA | GD | Pts | Qualification or relegation |
|---|---|---|---|---|---|---|---|---|---|---|
| 1 | Shkëndija (C) | 33 | 21 | 9 | 3 | 65 | 23 | +42 | 72 | Qualification for the Champions League second qualifying round |
| 2 | Metalurg | 33 | 17 | 10 | 6 | 48 | 24 | +24 | 61 | Qualification for the Europa League second qualifying round (Note: Metalurg qualified for the Europa League second qualifying round by winning the 2010–11 Macedonian Football Cup.) |
| 3 | Renova | 33 | 17 | 9 | 7 | 54 | 31 | +23 | 60 | Qualification for the Europa League first qualifying round |
| 4 | Rabotnichki | 33 | 15 | 10 | 8 | 53 | 31 | +22 | 55 | Qualification for the Europa League first qualifying round |
| 5 | Sileks | 33 | 13 | 8 | 12 | 39 | 38 | +1 | 47 | |
| 6 | Horizont Turnovo | 33 | 13 | 6 | 14 | 35 | 35 | 0 | 45 | |
| 7 | Teteks | 33 | 12 | 8 | 13 | 38 | 36 | +2 | 44 | |
| 8 | Bregalnica Shtip | 33 | 12 | 5 | 16 | 33 | 49 | −16 | 41 | |
| 9 | Skopje (R) | 33 | 9 | 10 | 14 | 36 | 39 | −3 | 37 | Qualification for the relegation playoff |
| 10 | Napredok (O) | 33 | 10 | 7 | 16 | 30 | 48 | −18 | 37 | Qualification for the relegation playoff |
| 11 | Vardar (Note: Vardar were deducted three points for not showing up at the match against Turnovo in 4th round.) | 33 | 9 | 5 | 19 | 24 | 44 | −20 | 29 | Spared from relegation (Note: Vardar were spared from relegation because of fusion with Miravci.) |
| 12 | Pelister (R) | 33 | 5 | 3 | 25 | 25 | 82 | −57 | 18 | Relegation to the Macedonian Second League |

Source: MacedonianFootball.com
Rules for classification: 1) Points; 2) Goal difference; 3) Goals scored; 4) Head-to-head points; 5) Head-to-head goal difference; 6) Head-to-head away goals scored (only if two teams); 7) Head-to-head goals scored; 8) Draw; 9) Play-off. (Note: Criteria 2, 3 and 8 is only used if not deciding Champion, teams for UEFA competitions or relegation).
(C) Champions; (O) Play-off winners; (R) Relegated

== Results ==
The schedule consisted of three rounds. During the first two rounds, each team played each other once home and away for a total of 22 matches. The pairings of the third round were then set according to the standings after the first two rounds, giving every team a third game against each opponent for a total of 33 games per team.

| Home \ Away | BRE | MET | NAP | PEL | RAB | REN | SIL | SKO | SKE | TET | TUR | VAR | BRE | MET | NAP | PEL | RAB | REN | SIL | SKO | SKE | TET | TUR | VAR |
|---|---|---|---|---|---|---|---|---|---|---|---|---|---|---|---|---|---|---|---|---|---|---|---|---|
| Bregalnica Shtip | — | 1–2 | 4–2 | 2–0 | 0–2 | 3–1 | 2–2 | 1–0 | 2–1 | 1–0 | 1–0 | 0–0 | — | — | — | 4–0 | — | 1–4 | — | 0–0 | 0–2 | — | 1–0 | — |
| Metalurg | 1–0 | — | 1–2 | 4–0 | 0–1 | 2–0 | 3–0 | 1–2 | 1–1 | 1–0 | 3–0 | 1–0 | 3–0 | — | — | 5–0 | — | 0–0 | 2–1 | — | — | 1–1 | 1–1 | — |
| Napredok | 1–0 | 0–1 | — | 3–1 | 2–0 | 1–0 | 1–0 | 2–0 | 1–1 | 1–0 | 0–1 | 2–1 | 0–0 | 1–2 | — | 2–0 | 0–5 | — | — | 1–3 | — | 1–1 | — | — |
| Pelister | 2–0 | 0–0 | 1–1 | — | 0–3 | 0–1 | 1–3 | 5–4 | 0–1 | 1–1 | 2–0 | 1–2 | — | — | — | — | — | 0–5 | 2–3 | — | 1–3 | — | 1–4 | 1–0 |
| Rabotnichki | 3–1 | 2–2 | 0–0 | 3–0 | — | 1–1 | 0–0 | 1–1 | 1–1 | 1–2 | 2–1 | 2–0 | 7–0 | 1–1 | — | 1–2 | — | — | — | 1–1 | — | 2–1 | 3–1 | — |
| Renova | 2–0 | 1–0 | 5–0 | 2–0 | 1–1 | — | 3–1 | 1–1 | 1–0 | 2–1 | 0–0 | 4–0 | — | — | 4–1 | — | 2–2 | — | 2–1 | — | 1–1 | 4–2 | — | 1–0 |
| Sileks | 3–1 | 0–1 | 1–1 | 2–1 | 2–0 | 2–0 | — | 0–0 | 1–1 | 0–0 | 0–2 | 1–0 | 3–0 (Note: Match awarded.) | 2–1 | 2–1 | — | 2–0 | — | — | — | — | — | — | 0–1 |
| Skopje | 0–3 | 0–0 | 1–0 | 2–0 | 0–1 | 0–1 | 2–1 | — | 3–3 | 1–0 | 3–0 | 1–0 | — | — | — | 4–1 | — | 2–0 | 1–1 | — | 2–2 | — | 1–2 | — |
| Shkëndija | 2–0 | 3–0 | 3–0 | 4–1 | 3–0 | 4–1 | 3–0 | 1–0 | — | 0–0 | 3–0 | 3–1 | — | 2–2 | 4–1 | — | 2–1 | — | 1–0 | — | — | 3–1 | — | 2–0 |
| Teteks | 2–0 | 0–0 | 2–1 | 3–0 | 0–1 | 1–1 | 1–1 | 2–1 | 1–0 | — | 1–0 | 3–2 | 0–2 | — | — | 6–1 | — | — | 0–2 | 2–1 | — | — | — | 2–1 |
| Horizont Turnovo | 2–0 | 1–3 | 1–0 | 3–0 | 0–2 | 2–0 | 4–0 | 1–0 | 0–1 | 1–0 | — | 3–0 (Note: Match awarded because Vardar did not show up.) | — | — | 0–0 | — | — | 1–1 | 2–0 | — | 0–2 | 0–2 | — | 1–1 |
| Vardar | 1–2 | 1–2 | 2–1 | 1–0 | 1–0 | 0–2 | 2–1 | 1–0 | 0–2 | 2–0 | 1–1 | — | 1–1 | 0–1 | 1–0 | — | 1–3 | — | — | 0–0 | — | — | — | — |

Source: MacedonianFootball.com
Legend: Blue = home team win; Yellow = draw; Red = away team win.

== Relegation playoff ==
8 June 2011
16:30 CEST

| Napredok | 2–0 | Tikvesh |
|---|---|---|
| Simjanovski 12'; Najdoski 87' | Report |

Stadion Gjorche Petrov, Skopje
Attendance: 400
Referee: Ljubomir Krstevski (Bitola)

8 June 2011
16:30 CEST

| Skopje | 1–4 | Miravci |
|---|---|---|
| Angelovski 85' | Report | Shterjov 28'; Popov 48'; Buchkov 58' (pen.); Tashkov 73' |

Stadion Goce Delchev, Prilep
Attendance: 2,000
Referee: Goran Spirkoski (Prilep)

== Top goalscorers ==
| Rank | Player | Club | Goals |
|---|---|---|---|
| 1 | (North Macedonia) Hristijan Kirovski | Skopje | 20 |
| 2 | (North Macedonia) Borche Manevski | Rabotnichki | 19 |
| 3 | (North Macedonia) Ferhan Hasani | Shkëndija | 13 |
| 4 | (North Macedonia) Ersen Sali | Shkëndija | 12 |
| 4 | (North Macedonia) Aleksandar Temelkov | Sileks | 12 |
| 6 | (North Macedonia) Boban Janchevski | Renova | 11 |
| 6 | (North Macedonia) Izair Emini | Shkëndija | 11 |
| 8 | (North Macedonia) Cvetan Churlinov | Turnovo | 9 |
| 8 | (North Macedonia) Ilber Ali | Renova | 9 |
| 8 | (North Macedonia) Mile Krstev | Metalurg | 9 |
| 8 | (North Macedonia) Gjorgi Zarevski | Sileks | 9 |
| 8 | (North Macedonia) Vulnet Emini | Renova | 9 |

Source: Soccerway

== See also ==
- 2010–11 Macedonian Football Cup
- 2010–11 Macedonian Second Football League
- 2010–11 Macedonian Third Football League
