= 2011–12 Macedonian First Football League =

Macedonian First League
- Season: 2011–12
- Dates: 31 July 2011 – 23 May 2012
- Champions: Vardar; 6th Macedonian title 7th domestic title
- Relegated: Ohrid; 11 Oktomvri
- Champions League: Vardar
- Europa League: Renova; Metalurg; Shkëndija
- Matches: 198
- Goals: 501 (2.53 per match)
- Top goalscorer: Filip Ivanovski (24 goals)
- Biggest home win: Metalurg 6–0 Ohrid (10 December 2011)
- Biggest away win: Ohrid 1–7 Renova (23 May 2012)
- Highest scoring: Turnovo 5–4 Rabotnichki (23 May 2012)

The 2011–12 Macedonian First League was the 20th season of the Macedonian First Football League, the highest football league of Macedonia. It began on 31 July 2011 and ended on 23 May 2012.

The league title was won by FK Vardar, winning its 6th official Macedonian First League title, and first since the 2002–03 season. The team went through the season without a single defeat until Round 32, on 20 May 2012, out of 33 games played. The defeat ended their chance of being undefeated, however, concluded with only 1 loss on a very dominating season.

== Promotion and relegation ==
At the start of the 2011–12 season

Promoted from 2010–11 Second League

- 11 Oktomvri (winners)
- Ohrid (runners-up)
- Miravci (Fourth placed; won play-off match)^{1}

Relegated to 2011–12 Second League

- Skopje (9th; lost play-off match)
- Vardar (11th)^{1}
- Pelister (12th)

At the end of the 2011–12 season

Promoted from 2011–12 Second League

- Pelister (winners)
- Drita (runners-up)

Relegated to 2012–13 Second League

- Ohrid (11th)
- 11 Oktomvri (12th)

1 Vardar was initially relegated, but was stayed after was merged with Miravci, which won play-off match against Skopje. Later, the two sides were separated and Miravci were refused a First League licence.

== Participating teams ==
Location of teams in 2011–12 Macedonian First League

Club	Manager	City	Stadium	Capacity
11 Oktomvri	(North Macedonia) Toni Naumovski	Prilep	Stadion Goce Delchev	15,000
Bregalnica	(North Macedonia) Trajche Senev	Shtip	Gradski stadion Shtip	4,000
Metalurg Skopje	(North Macedonia) Georgi Hristov	Skopje	Stadion Zhelezarnica	4,000
Napredok	(North Macedonia) Dragan Bocheski	Kichevo	Gradski stadion Kichevo	5,000
Ohrid	(North Macedonia) Gorazd Mihajlov	Ohrid	SRC Biljanini Izvori	3,000
Rabotnichki	(Slovenia) Robert Pevnik	Skopje	Philip II Arena	36,400
Renova	(North Macedonia) Vlatko Kostov	Djepchishte	Gradski stadion Tetovo	15,000
Shkëndija	(North Macedonia) Qatip Osmani	Tetovo	Gradski stadion Tetovo	15,000
Sileks	(North Macedonia) Ane Andovski	Kratovo	Stadion Sileks	5,000
Teteks	(North Macedonia) Dragi Setinov	Tetovo	Gradski stadion Tetovo	15,000
Horizont Turnovo	(North Macedonia) Ljupcho Dimitkovski	Turnovo	Stadion Kukush	1,500
Vardar	(North Macedonia) Ilcho Gjorgioski	Skopje	Philip II Arena	36,400

== League table ==
Pos	Team	Pld	W	D	L	GF	GA	GD	Pts	Qualification or relegation
1	Vardar (C)	33	22	10	1	50	15	+35	76	Qualification for the Champions League second qualifying round
2	Metalurg	33	19	10	4	53	16	+37	67	Qualification for the Europa League first qualifying round (Note: Renova qualified for the Europa League first qualifying round by winning the 2011–12 Macedonian Football Cup.)
3	Shkëndija	33	20	6	7	53	28	+25	66	Qualification for the Europa League first qualifying round
4	Renova	33	13	13	7	56	38	+18	52	Qualification for the Europa League first qualifying round
5	Bregalnica Shtip	33	13	6	14	51	47	+4	45	
6	Sileks	33	13	3	17	42	51	−9	42	
7	Napredok	33	12	6	15	37	51	−14	42	
8	Rabotnichki	33	11	8	14	50	45	+5	41	
9	Horizont Turnovo (O)	33	10	8	15	34	42	−8	38	Qualification for the relegation playoff
10	Teteks (O)	33	8	11	14	23	48	−25	35	Qualification for the relegation playoff
11	Ohrid (R)	33	6	8	19	26	62	−36	26	Relegation to the Macedonian Second League
12	11 Oktomvri (R)	33	3	7	23	26	58	−32	16	Relegation to the Macedonian Second League

Source: MacedonianFootball.com, Soccerway
Rules for classification: 1) Points; 2) Goal difference; 3) Goals scored; 4) Head-to-head points; 5) Head-to-head goal difference; 6) Head-to-head away goals scored (only if two teams); 7) Head-to-head goals scored; 8) Draw; 9) Play-off. (Note: Criteria 2, 3 and 8 is only used if not deciding Champion, teams for UEFA competitions or relegation).
(C) Champions; (O) Play-off winners; (R) Relegated

== Results ==
Every team will play three times against each other team for a total of 33 matches. The first 22 matchdays will consist of a regular double round-robin schedule. The league standings at this point will then be used to determine the games for the last 11 matchdays.

Home \ Away	OKT	BRE	MET	NAP	OHR	RAB	REN	SKE	SIL	TET	TUR	VAR	OKT	BRE	MET	NAP	OHR	RAB	REN	SKE	SIL	TET	TUR	VAR
11 Oktomvri	—	0–1	0–1	2–2	0–3	2–3	0–3	2–2	1–2	4–0	2–0	0–1	—	—	—	—	3–1	—	—	1–1	1–3	—	1–2	0–1
Bregalnica Shtip	2–0	—	1–1	0–1	3–1	3–2	3–2	2–3	3–1	2–0	0–1	2–3	4–1	—	—	3–2	2–0	—	—	—	—	1–2	2–1	—
Metalurg	0–0	1–0	—	2–0	6–0	0–0	2–1	0–0	3–0	2–0	1–0	1–1	3–0	2–1	—	1–1	—	—	—	1–0	1–0	5–0	—	—
Napredok	1–0	0–1	0–4	—	3–0	1–1	1–1	0–0	1–0	4–0	1–0	0–1	2–0	—	—	—	—	—	—	3–0	3–0	2–1	—	0–0
Ohrid	1–1	0–0	0–0	3–1	—	0–1	2–2	1–2	2–0	1–0	0–0	0–2	—	—	1–4	1–2	—	0–2	1–7	—	—	—	1–1	—
Rabotnichki	3–0	2–1	0–1	4–0	1–2	—	5–1	3–1	2–0	1–1	1–1	1–2	1–1	1–3	0–3	4–1	—	—	3–1	—	—	0–0	—	—
Renova	1–1	0–0	1–1	4–0	2–0	3–1	—	0–2	2–0	2–2	0–0	0–0	3–2	2–2	1–0	5–0	—	—	—	—	1–0	0–0	—	—
Shkëndija	3–0	1–0	2–0	3–0	2–0	2–0	2–2	—	2–1	0–0	2–0	0–1	—	3–2	—	—	1–0	1–0	4–0	—	—	—	2–1	1–0
Sileks	2–0	2–1	1–1	2–1	1–0	2–1	2–1	1–4	—	4–0	3–2	1–1	—	2–1	—	—	5–2	1–0	—	1–4	—	—	0–1	1–2
Teteks	1–0	3–1	0–2	1–0	1–1	1–1	1–5	2–0	1–1	—	0–3	0–0	2–0	—	—	—	0–0	—	—	0–2	2–1	—	—	0–0
Horizont Turnovo	1–0	2–2	1–2	0–2	1–2	1–0	0–1	2–1	2–1	0–2	—	1–2	—	—	1–1	2–1	—	5–4	0–1	—	—	2–1	—	—
Vardar	2–0	3–0	1–0	5–1	2–0	1–0	0–0	2–0	2–1	1–0	3–0	—	—	2–1	2–1	—	4–0	2–2	1–1	—	—	—	0–0	—

Source: MacedonianFootball.com
Legend: Blue = home team win; Yellow = draw; Red = away team win.

== Relegation playoff ==
2 June 2012
16:30 CEST

Teteks	0–0	Skopje
	Report
Penalties
Georgievski (penalty scored); Ristovski (penalty scored); Mitrevski (penalty scored); Aliu (penalty scored); Velinov (penalty scored)	5–4	(penalty scored) Popovski; (penalty missed) Jasharoski; (penalty scored) Argirovski; (penalty scored) Dimitrovski; (penalty scored) Galachev

Stadion Tumbe Kafe, Bitola
Attendance: 700
Referee: Marjan Markoski (Ohrid)

3 June 2012
16:30 CEST

Horizont Turnovo	1–0	Gorno Lisiche
Milushev 31'	Report

Stadion Goce Delchev, Prilep
Attendance: 2,000
Referee: Marjan Eckoski (Ohrid)

== Season statistics ==
=== Top scorers ===
Updated 21 May 2012

Rank	Player	Club	Goals
1	(North Macedonia) Filip Ivanovski	Vardar	24
2	(North Macedonia) Borche Manevski	Rabotnichki	17
3	(North Macedonia) Boban Janchevski	Renova	13
3	(North Macedonia) Blagoja Geshoski	11 Oktomvri	13
3	(North Macedonia) Angel Nacev	Sileks	13
3	(North Macedonia) Muharem Bajrami	Renova	13
7	(Kosovo) Genc Iseni	Bregalnica	12
8	(North Macedonia) Cvetan Churlinov	Metalurg	11
9	(North Macedonia) Hristijan Dimoski	Metalurg	9
9	(North Macedonia) Ersen Sali	Shkëndija	9
9	(North Macedonia) Krste Velkoski	Rabotnichki	9

== See also ==
- 2011–12 Macedonian Football Cup
- 2011–12 Macedonian Second Football League
- 2011–12 Macedonian Third Football League
