= 2010–11 Macedonian Second Football League =

Macedonian Second League
- Season: 2010–11
- Champions: 11 Oktomvri
- Promoted: 11 Oktomvri; Ohrid
- Relegated: Novaci; Cementarnica; Vlaznimi

The 2010–11 Macedonian Second Football League was the nineteenth season since its establishment. It began on 8 August 2010 and ended on 29 May 2011.

== Participating teams ==
Location of teams in 2010–11 Macedonian Second League

Club	City	Stadium	Capacity
11 Oktomvri	Prilep	Stadion Goce Delchev	15,000
Belasica	Strumica	Stadion Mladost	6,370
Cementarnica 55	Skopje	Stadion Cementarnica	2,000
Drita	Bogovinje	Stadion Bogovinje	500
Euromilk Gorno Lisiche	Skopje	Stadion Gorno Lisiche	1,500
Lokomotiva	Skopje	Stadion Komunalec	1,000
Miravci	Miravci	Stadion Miravci	1,000
Novaci 2005	Novaci	Stadion Novaci	500
Ohrid 2004	Ohrid	SRC Biljanini Izvori	3,000
Ohrid Lote	Ohrid	SRC Biljanini Izvori	3,000
Rinia Gostivar	Gostivar	Gradski stadion Gostivar	1,000
Tikvesh	Kavadarci	Gradski Stadion Kavadarci	7,500
Vlaznimi	Struga	Stadion Gradska Plazha	500
Vëllazërimi	Kichevo	Gradski stadion Kichevo	5,000

== League table ==
Pos	Team	Pld	W	D	L	GF	GA	GD	Pts	Promotion or relegation
1	11 Oktomvri (C, P)	26	16	6	4	50	19	+31	54	Promotion to Macedonian First League
2	Ohrid (P)	26	16	5	5	51	21	+30	53	Promotion to Macedonian First League
3	Tikvesh	26	13	9	4	45	27	+18	48	Qualification to Promotion play-off
4	Miravci	26	14	4	8	43	22	+21	46	Qualification to Promotion play-off
5	Belasica	26	13	4	9	39	26	+13	43	
6	Rinia	26	10	9	7	25	19	+6	39	
7	Drita	26	9	8	9	37	29	+8	35 (Note: Head-to-head record: Drita 3 pts, Euromilk Gorno Lisiche 3 pts. Goal difference: +2 for Drita.)	
8	Euromilk Gorno Lisiche	26	11	2	13	41	49	−8	35	
9	Lokomotiva	26	9	4	13	27	46	−19	31	
10	Ohrid Lote	26	9	2	15	40	49	−9	29	
11	Vëllazërimi	26	8	4	14	28	56	−28	28	
12	Novaci (R)	26	5	7	14	22	37	−15	22	Relegation to Macedonian Third League
13	Cementarnica 55 (R)	26	4	10	12	20	41	−21	22	Relegation to Macedonian Third League
14	Vlaznimi (Note: Vlaznimi were deducted 1 point.) (R)	26	6	4	16	24	51	−27	21	Relegation to Macedonian Third League

Source: MacedonianFootball.com, Soccerway
Rules for classification: 1) Points; 2) Head-to-head points; 3) Head-to-head goal difference; 4) Head-to-head away goals scored
(C) Champions; (P) Promoted; (R) Relegated

== Results ==
Home \ Away	OKT	BEL	CEM	DRI	EGL	LOK	MIR	NOV	OHR	OHL	RIN	TIK	VLN	VLZ
11 Oktomvri	—	0–0	5–1	3–0	3–0	5–2	0–2	2–1	1–0	1–0	1–1	2–1	6–1	6–2
Belasica	1–0	—	1–1	0–1	1–0	4–0	2–0	2–0	3–2	4–1	0–1	1–3	3–2	3–0
Cementarnica 55	0–0	1–0	—	2–1	1–1	0–0	1–3	1–1	1–1	0–1	0–0	1–1	3–0	0–1
Drita	1–2	0–0	3–0	—	4–0	0–1	1–0	0–0	1–1	5–1	1–1	1–1	2–2	4–1
Euromilk Gorno Lisiche	0–2	3–4	2–2	4–2	—	2–1	1–0	4–1	0–1	1–0	2–1	2–1	2–1	4–0
Lokomotiva	0–1	2–1	0–1	2–1	0–1	—	2–1	2–1	2–1	2–1	0–2	1–1	3–1	2–2
Miravci	0–0	0–1	4–0	2–1	2–0	3–0	—	0–0	0–6	1–0	1–0	1–1	7–0	4–0
Novaci	0–1	1–0	3–1	1–0	1–4	2–2	1–1	—	0–2	0–0	2–3	2–1	2–2	2–0
Ohrid	1–2	1–0	4–0	0–0	5–1	4–1	1–0	1–0	—	3–2	2–0	3–0	2–1	2–0
Ohrid Lote	3–2	2–3	3–2	0–1	4–2	2–0	0–5	3–0	2–3	—	2–0	1–4	1–1	6–1
Rinia Gostivar	0–0	1–0	0–0	2–1	3–1	4–0	1–2	2–1	1–0	1–0	—	2–2	1–0	0–0
Tikvesh	0–0	1–1	4–1	2–2	2–1	2–0	1–2	1–0	1–1	1–0	1–0	—	1–0	2–1
Vlaznimi	0–4	0–3	1–0	1–2	2–1	1–2	2–0	1–0	0–2	2–0	2–0	1–2	—	2–1
Vëllazërimi	2–1	3–1	1–0	0–2	2–1	2–0	0–2	1–0	2–2	3–2	0–0	0–4	1–0	—

Source: MacedonianFootball.com, Soccerway
Legend: Blue = home team win; Yellow = draw; Red = away team win.

== Promotion playoff ==
8 June 2011
16:30 CEST

Napredok	2–0	Tikvesh
Simjanovski 12'; Najdoski 87'	Report

Stadion Gjorche Petrov, Skopje
Attendance: 400
Referee: Ljubomir Krstevski (Bitola)

8 June 2011
16:30 CEST

Skopje	1–4	Miravci
Angelovski 85'	Report	Shterjov 28'; Popov 48'; Buchkov 58' (pen.); Tashkov 73'

Stadion Goce Delchev, Prilep
Attendance: 2,000
Referee: Goran Spirkoski (Prilep)

== See also ==
- 2010–11 Macedonian Football Cup
- 2010–11 Macedonian First Football League
- 2010–11 Macedonian Third Football League
