= Sašo Lazarevski =

Macedonian footballer

Personal information
- Full name: Sašo Lazarevski; Сашо Лазаревски
- Date of birth: 24 March 1978 (age 48)
- Place of birth: Bitola, Yugoslavia
- Height: 1.77 m (5 ft 10 in)
- Position: Defender

Senior career*
Years	Team	Apps	(Gls)
2000–2001	TeBe Berlin	4	(0)
2001–2002	Belasica	25	(3)
2002–2004	Marek Dupnitsa	29	(0)
2004–2005	Bregalnica Štip	27	(2)
2005	Lokomotiv Plovdiv	1	(0)
2006	Vlazrimi	14	(3)
2006–2007	Rabotnički	4	(1)
2007–2009	Milano Kumanovo	51	(1)
2009–2010	Pelister	17	(1)
2010	Novaci	19	(1)
2011	Napredok	14	(0)
2011	Bregalnica Štip	17	(0)
2012–2013	Pelister	30	(2)
2013–2014	Sileks		
2014–2015	Mladost CD		

International career^{‡}
2001–2005	Macedonia	11	(0)
- * Club domestic league appearances and goals as of 5 June 2012 ‡ National team caps and goals as of 17 July 2009

Sašo Lazarevski (Macedonian: Сашо Лазаревски) (born 24 March 1978 in Bitola) is a Macedonian retired footballer who last played as a defender for FK Mladost Carev Dvor in Second Macedonian Football League.

== International career ==
He made his senior debut for Macedonia in a November 2001 friendly match away against Hungary and has earned a total of 10 caps, scoring no goals. His final international was a June 2005 FIFA World Cup qualification match against Armenia.

== Honours ==
=== Pelister ===
- Macedonian Second League: 2011–12

=== Sileks ===
- Macedonian Second League: 2013–14
