= 1963–64 Macedonian Republic League =

Macedonian Republic League
- Season: 1963–64

The 1963–64 Macedonian Republic League was the 21st since its establishment. Bregalnica Shtip won their first championship title.

== Participating teams ==
| Club | City |
|---|---|
| Belasica | Strumica |
| Bregalnica | Shtip |
| Jugohrom | Tetovo |
| Karaorman | Struga |
| Kozhuf | Gevgelija |
| KSK | Kumanovo |
| Metalec | Skopje |
| Napredok | Kichevo |
| Ohrid | Ohrid |
| Pelagonija | Bitola |
| Rabotnichki | Skopje |
| Teteks | Tetovo |
| Tikvesh | Kavadarci |
| Vardar | Negotino |

== Final table ==
| Pos | Team | Pld | W | D | L | GF | GA | GD | Pts |
|---|---|---|---|---|---|---|---|---|---|
| 1 | Bregalnica Shtip | 26 | 16 | 4 | 6 | 62 | 38 | +24 | 36 |
| 2 | Belasica Strumica | 26 | 12 | 6 | 8 | 52 | 38 | +14 | 30 |
| 3 | Teteks Tetovo | 26 | 11 | 7 | 8 | 37 | 38 | −1 | 29 |
| 4 | Metalec Skopje | 26 | 12 | 5 | 9 | 54 | 44 | +10 | 29 |
| 5 | Vardar Negotino | 26 | 11 | 7 | 8 | 43 | 47 | −4 | 29 |
| 6 | Karaorman Struga | 26 | 12 | 4 | 10 | 60 | 46 | +14 | 28 |
| 7 | KSK Kumanovo | 26 | 12 | 3 | 11 | 57 | 51 | +6 | 27 |
| 8 | Tikvesh Kavadarci | 26 | 11 | 5 | 10 | 56 | 55 | +1 | 27 |
| 9 | Pelagonija Bitola | 26 | 11 | 4 | 11 | 39 | 45 | −6 | 26 |
| 10 | Ohrid | 26 | 11 | 3 | 12 | 52 | 46 | +6 | 25 |
| 11 | Rabotnichki Skopje | 26 | 8 | 8 | 10 | 46 | 38 | +8 | 24 |
| 12 | Jugohrom Jegunovce | 26 | 9 | 5 | 12 | 54 | 64 | −10 | 23 |
| 13 | Napredok Kichevo | 26 | 8 | 7 | 11 | 52 | 70 | −18 | 23 |
| 14 | Kozhuf Gevgelija | 26 | 4 | 2 | 20 | 30 | 92 | −62 | 10 (Note: Errors in table: 148 total wins != 146 total losses and 694 total for != 712 total against) |
