= 2011–12 Macedonian Football Cup =

Tournament details
- Country: Macedonia
- Dates: 17 August 2011 – 2 May 2012
- Teams: 32

Final positions
- Champions: Renova (1st title)
- Runners-up: Rabotnichki

Tournament statistics
- Matches played: 43
- Goals scored: 129 (3 per match)

The 2011–12 Macedonian Football Cup was the 20th season of Macedonia's football knockout competition. Metalurg Skopje are the defending champions, having won their first title.

The 2011–12 champions were FK Renova who won their first title and was qualified for the first qualifying round of the 2012–13 UEFA Europa League.

== Competition calendar ==
Round	Date(s)	Fixtures	Clubs	New entries
First Round	17 August & 3 September 2011	16	32 → 16	32
Second Round	13, 14, 15, 28, 29 September 2011	16	16 → 8	none
Quarter-finals	19 October & 9 November 2011	8	8 → 4	none
Semi-finals	4 & 25 April 2012	4	4 → 2	none
Final	2 May 2012	1	2 → 1	none

== First round ==
Matches were played on 17 August 2011 and 3 September 2011.

Team 1	Score	Team 2
17 August 2011
Ljuboten (3)	1–2	Rinia Gostivar (2)
Ohrid Lote (2)	0–7	Shkëndija (1)
Lokomotiva Skopje (2)	0–0 (4–5 p)	Napredok (1)
Madjari Solidarnost (3)	2–2 (1–3 p)	Skopje (2)
Karaorman (3)	0–4	Renova (1)
Prespa (3)	0–3 (w/o)	Tikvesh (2)
Vasilevo (3)	1–7	Sileks (1)
Babi (3)	0–3	Bregalnica Shtip (1)
Karbinci (3)	0–3 (w/o)	11 Oktomvri (1)
Pobeda Junior (2)	1–2	Horizont Turnovo (1)
Drita (2)	2–3	Miravci (2)
Rufeja (2)	0–1	Metalurg (1)
Rudar (3)	1–3	Pelister (2)
Gorno Lisiche (2)	0–3	Vardar (1)
Treska (2)	0–0 (3–5 p)	Teteks (1)
3 September 2011
Mogila (3)	0–3	Rabotnichki (1)

== Second round ==
Entering this round are the 16 winners from the First Round. The first legs took place on 13, 14 and 15 September 2011 and the second legs took place on 28 and 29 September 2011.

Team 1	Agg.	Team 2	1st leg	2nd leg
Renova (1)	5–2	Rinia Gostivar (2)	0–1	5–1
Sileks (1)	2–2 (a)	Teteks (1)	2–2	0–0
11 Oktomvri (1)	4–2	Skopje (2)	4–0	0–2
Shkëndija (1)	2–2 (0–3 p)	Bregalnica Shtip (1)	2–0	0–2
Horizont Turnovo (1)	2–1	Pelister (2)	1–0	1–1
Napredok (1)	6–3	Miravci (2)	3–1	3–2
Rabotnichki (1)	0–0 (5–3 p)	Metalurg (1)	0–0	0–0
Vardar (1)	7–1	Tikvesh (2)	6–1	1–0

== Quarter-finals ==
The first legs of the quarter-finals took place on 19 October 2011, while the second legs took place on 8, 9 and 16 November 2011.

=== Summary ===
Team 1	Agg.	Team 2	1st leg	2nd leg
Rabotnichki (1)	7–1	Napredok (1)	4–1	3–0
Renova (1)	9–2	Teteks (1)	6–0	3–2
Horizont Turnovo (1)	3–1	Bregalnica Shtip (1)	3–1	0–0
Vardar (1)	3–2	11 Oktomvri (1)	2–0	1–2

=== Matches ===
19 October 2011
14:00 CEST

Rabotnichki (1)	4–1	Napredok (1)
Manevski 13'; Todorovski 18'; Velkoski 56', 57'		Mihajloski 42'

Stadion Boris Trajkovski, Skopje
Referee: Marjan Markoski (Ohrid)
16 November 2011
13:00 CET

Napredok (1)	0–3	Rabotnichki (1)
		Petkovski 19', 72'; Savić 23'

Gradski stadion, Kichevo
Referee: Zorancho Temelkov (Kavadarci)

Rabotnichki won 7–1 on aggregate.

19 October 2011
14:00 CEST

Renova (1)	6–0	Teteks (1)
Janchevski 17' (pen.), 48'; Bajrami 40', 46'; Ismaili 67'; Andonov 79'

Gradski stadion, Tetovo
Referee: Zoran Petkovski (Veles)
8 November 2011
13:00 CET

Teteks (1)	2–3	Renova (1)
Bilbilovski 44'; Stolevski 52'		Nuhiu 32'; Bajrami 45+1'; Fetai 86'

Gradski stadion, Tetovo
Referee: Faton Mustafi (Tetovo)

Renova won 9–2 on aggregate.

19 October 2011
14:00 CEST

Horizont Turnovo (1)	3–1	Bregalnica Shtip (1)
Gjorgiev 85', 90'; Mavrov 88'		Zdravkov 25'

Stadion Kukush, Turnovo
Referee: Zorancho Temelkov (Kavadarci)
9 November 2011
13:00 CET

Bregalnica Shtip (1)	0–0	Horizont Turnovo (1)

Gradski stadion, Shtip
Referee: Aleksandar Stavrev (Skopje)

Horizont Turnovo won 3–1 on aggregate.

19 October 2011
18:00 CEST

Vardar (1)	2–0	11 Oktomvri (1)
T. Veljanovski 36'; Petrov 65'

Philip II Arena, Skopje
Referee: Zoran Boshkov (Negotino)
9 November 2011
13:00 CET

11 Oktomvri (1)	2–1	Vardar (1)
A. Veljanovski 55'; Geshoski 80' (pen.)		Petrov 75'

Stadion Goce Delchev, Prilep
Referee: Ljubomir Krstevski (Bitola)

Vardar won 3–2 on aggregate.

== Semi-finals ==
The first legs of the semi-finals took place on 4 April 2012, while the second legs took place on 25 April 2012.

=== Summary ===
Team 1	Agg.	Team 2	1st leg	2nd leg
Vardar (1)	1–1 (a)	Renova (1)	1–1	0–0
Rabotnichki (1)	4–2	Horizont Turnovo (1)	1–1	3–1

=== Matches ===
4 April 2012
16:00 CEST

Vardar (1)	1−1	Renova (1)
Stjepanovikj 90+1'		Vajs 20' (o.g.)

Stadion Gjorche Petrov, Skopje
Attendance: 1,000
Referee: Zoran Boshkov (Negotino)
25 April 2012
16:00 CEST

Renova (1)	0−0	Vardar (1)

Gradski stadion, Tetovo
Attendance: 2,000
Referee: Goran Spirkoski (Prilep)

1–1 on aggregate. Renova won on away goals.

4 April 2012
16:00 CEST

Rabotnichki (1)	1−1	Horizont Turnovo (1)
Pandovski 22'		Georgiev 82'

Stadion Boris Trajkovski, Skopje
Attendance: 500
Referee: Marjan Markoski (Ohrid)
25 April 2012
16:00 CEST

Horizont Turnovo (1)	1−3	Rabotnichki (1)
Georgiev 37'		K. Velkoski 13'; Todorovski 29'; D. Velkovski 82'

Stadion Kukush, Turnovo
Attendance: 800
Referee: Josip Barton (Tetovo)

Rabotnichki won 4–2 on aggregate.

== Final ==
2 May 2012
16:00 CEST

Rabotnichki (1)	1–3	Renova (1)
Manevski 53'	Report	Bajrami 12'; Simovski 65'; Gafuri 90+3'

Gradski stadion, Shtip
Attendance: 500
Referee: Goran Spirkoski (Prilep)

== See also ==
- 2011–12 Macedonian First Football League
- 2011–12 Macedonian Second Football League
- 2011–12 Macedonian Third Football League
