= 2011–12 Macedonian Second Football League =

Football league season

Macedonian Second League
- Season: 2011–12
- Champions: Pelister
- Promoted: Pelister; Drita
- Relegated: Korabi; Vëllazërimi; Osogovo; Ohrid Lote; Belasica

The 2011–12 Macedonian Second Football League was the 20th season since its establishment. It began on 7 August 2011 and ended on 27 May 2012.

== Participating teams ==
Location of teams in 2011–12 Macedonian Second League

Club	City	Stadium	Capacity
Belasica	Strumica	Stadion Mladost	6,370
Drita	Bogovinje	Stadion Bogovinje	500
Euromilk Gorno Lisiche	Skopje	Stadion Gorno Lisiche	1,500
Korabi	Debar	Gradski Stadion Debar	5,000
Lokomotiva	Skopje	Komunalec Stadium	1,000
Makedonija G.P.^{1}	Skopje	Stadion Gjorche Petrov	3,000
Miravci	Miravci	Stadion Miravci	1,000
Ohrid Lote	Ohrid	SRC Biljanini Izvori	3,000
Osogovo	Kochani	Stadion Nikola Mantov	4,350
Pelister	Bitola	Stadion Tumbe Kafe	8,000
Pobeda Junior	Prilep	Stadion Goce Delchev	15,000
Rinia Gostivar	Gostivar	Gradski stadion Gostivar	1,000
Rufeja	Miletino, Brvenica	Stadion Miletino	500
Skopje	Skopje	Stadion Avtokomanda	4,000
Tikvesh	Kavadarci	Gradski Stadion Kavadarci	7,500
Vëllazërimi	Kichevo	Gradski stadion Kichevo	5,000

^{1} Makedonija G.P. was in the first part of season participated as Treska.

== League table ==
Pos	Team	Pld	W	D	L	GF	GA	GD	Pts	Promotion or relegation
1	Pelister (C, P)	30	19	4	7	42	23	+19	61	Promotion to Macedonian First League
2	Drita (P)	30	16	10	4	49	19	+30	58	Promotion to Macedonian First League
3	Skopje	30	17	5	8	50	26	+24	56 (Note: Head-to-head record: Skopje 4 pts, Euromilk Gorno Lisiche 1 pts.)	Qualification to Promotion play-off
4	Euromilk Gorno Lisiche	30	17	5	8	60	30	+30	56	Qualification to Promotion play-off
5	Miravci	30	16	6	8	46	23	+23	54	
6	Makedonija G.P.	30	14	6	10	48	31	+17	48	
7	Tikvesh	30	13	6	11	45	41	+4	45	
8	Rufeja (Note: Rufeja were deducted 3 points.)	30	14	5	11	48	35	+13	44	
9	Lokomotiva (Note: Lokomotiva were deducted 3 points.)	30	14	4	12	35	33	+2	43	
10	Rinia	30	11	8	11	39	34	+5	41	
11	Pobeda Junior	30	12	5	13	36	38	−2	41	
12	Korabi (R)	30	11	3	16	34	45	−11	36	Relegation to Macedonian Third League
13	Vëllazërimi (R)	30	7	8	15	28	68	−40	29	Relegation to Macedonian Third League
14	Osogovo (R)	30	6	4	20	29	64	−35	22	Relegation to Macedonian Third League
15	Ohrid Lote (R)	30	6	1	23	24	74	−50	19	Relegation to Macedonian Third League
16	Belasica (R)	30	4	6	20	27	56	−29	18	Relegation to Macedonian Third League

Source: MacedonianFootball.com, Soccerway
Rules for classification: 1) Points; 2) Head-to-head points; 3) Head-to-head goal difference; 4) Head-to-head away goals scored
(C) Champions; (P) Promoted; (R) Relegated

== Results ==
Every team will play each other team twice (home and away) for a total of 30 matches each.

Home \ Away	BEL	DRI	EGL	KOR	LOK	MGP	MIR	OHL	OSO	PEL	POB	RIN	RUF	SKO	TIK	VLZ
Belasica	—	1–2	0–3	2–0	0–0	0–2	0–1	4–0	3–1	0–0	1–2	1–1	1–1	1–1	0–2	2–2
Drita	2–0	—	1–0	5–1	4–0	0–0	2–1	2–0	4–1	0–1	2–1	2–0	1–1	0–1	4–0	2–0
Euromilk Gorno Lisiche	2–1	1–1	—	3–0	3–1	2–2	0–1	4–0	5–1	2–0	1–0	1–0	5–1	0–1	4–1	3–1
Korab	2–0	0–1	1–0	—	1–0	1–0	2–0	2–0	5–2	0–0	4–0	1–0	2–3	1–1	3–1	0–1
Lokomotiva	1–0	0–0	1–0	3–2	—	0–2	2–1	3–0	3–0	2–0	3–0	1–2	0–1	2–1	2–0	3–1
Makedonija	4–0	3–1	1–3	5–0	0–2	—	2–2	3–0	2–0	0–1	2–0	0–1	0–0	1–1	3–0	3–2
Miravci	4–1	2–2	1–0	1–0	0–1	2–0	—	3–0	4–1	1–0	3–0	2–1	1–1	3–1	0–0	6–0
Ohrid Lote	2–1	0–2	0–1	3–1	3–0	0–3	0–2	—	4–2	1–3	3–2	1–5	0–2	1–4	1–7	0–1
Osogovo	3–0	0–0	2–3	2–0	0–0	0–3	0–2	1–0	—	1–2	1–2	3–2	1–5	1–0	1–0	0–0
Pelister	4–1	3–2	0–1	2–0	2–0	3–1	2–1	3–0	1–1	—	2–0	3–2	1–0	1–0	1–0	4–2
Pobeda Junior	2–0	1–1	1–0	1–2	1–2	4–1	2–0	3–0	2–1	0–0	—	1–0	2–0	0–1	1–1	3–0
Rinia Gostivar	1–0	1–1	3–0	2–0	3–2	1–1	0–0	1–1	3–1	1–0	0–1	—	1–0	3–1	0–0	0–0
Rufeja	4–1	0–3	2–0	3–1	2–1	0–1	0–1	0–1	3–1	0–1	2–0	4–0	—	1–0	6–1	5–0
Skopje	2–1	0–0	2–2	2–1	3–0	1–2	2–1	3–0	2–0	3–0	3–1	1–0	5–0	—	2–0	4–1
Tikvesh	4–1	0–2	1–1	1–0	0–0	2–0	1–0	2–1	3–1	1–0	2–1	1–1	2–0	1–2	—	9–3
Vëllazërimi	1–4	0–0	1–7	1–1	1–0	2–1	0–0	2–0	1–0	0–2	1–1	2–5	1–1	1–0	0–2	—

Source: MacedonianFootball.com, Soccerway
Legend: Blue = home team win; Yellow = draw; Red = away team win.

== Promotion playoff ==
2 June 2012
16:30 CEST

Teteks	0–0	Skopje
	Report
Penalties
Georgievski (penalty scored); Ristovski (penalty scored); Mitrevski (penalty scored); Aliu (penalty scored); Velinov (penalty scored)	5–4	(penalty scored) Popovski; (penalty missed) Jasharoski; (penalty scored) Argirovski; (penalty scored) Dimitrovski; (penalty scored) Galachev

Stadion Tumbe Kafe, Bitola
Attendance: 700
Referee: Marjan Markoski (Ohrid)

3 June 2012
16:30 CEST

Horizont Turnovo	1–0	Gorno Lisiche
Milushev 31'	Report

Stadion Goce Delchev, Prilep
Attendance: 2,000
Referee: Marjan Eckoski (Ohrid)

== See also ==
- 2011–12 Macedonian Football Cup
- 2011–12 Macedonian First Football League
- 2011–12 Macedonian Third Football League
