= 1969–70 Macedonian Republic League =

Macedonian Republic League
- Season: 1969–70

The 1969–70 Macedonian Republic League was the 26th since its establishment. FK Skopje back than MIK Skopje won their 1st championship title.

== Participating teams ==
| Club | City |
|---|---|
| 11 Oktomvri | Prilep |
| Balkan | Skopje |
| Belasica | Strumica |
| FCU Skopje | Skopje |
| Karaorman | Struga |
| Kozhuf | Gevgelija |
| Kumanovo | Kumanovo |
| Ljuboten | Tetovo |
| Mavrovo | Gostivar |
| MIK Skopje | Skopje |
| Ohrid | Ohrid |
| Osogovo | Kochani |
| Ovche Pole | Sveti Nikole |
| Pelister | Bitola |
| Sloga | Skopje |
| Vardar | Negotino |

== Final table ==
| Pos | Team | Pld | W | D | L | GF | GA | GD | Pts |
|---|---|---|---|---|---|---|---|---|---|
| 1 | MIK Skopje (C) | 30 | 20 | 8 | 2 | 66 | 26 | +40 | 48 |
| 2 | Balkan | 30 | 14 | 10 | 6 | 57 | 34 | +23 | 38 |
| 3 | Mavrovo Gostivar | 30 | 16 | 5 | 9 | 50 | 32 | +18 | 37 |
| 4 | Ovče Pole | 30 | 14 | 6 | 10 | 42 | 38 | +4 | 34 |
| 5 | Sloga | 30 | 13 | 6 | 11 | 58 | 52 | +6 | 32 |
| 6 | Kumanovo | 30 | 11 | 7 | 12 | 43 | 44 | −1 | 29 |
| 7 | Karaorman | 30 | 9 | 10 | 11 | 39 | 38 | +1 | 28 |
| 8 | FCU Skopje | 30 | 10 | 8 | 12 | 50 | 52 | −2 | 28 |
| 9 | Osogovo | 30 | 11 | 7 | 12 | 36 | 43 | −7 | 28 (Note: 1 point deducted?) |
| 10 | Vardar Negotino | 30 | 12 | 3 | 15 | 51 | 49 | +2 | 27 |
| 11 | Kozhuf | 30 | 12 | 3 | 15 | 54 | 64 | −10 | 27 |
| 12 | Belasica | 30 | 11 | 4 | 15 | 47 | 51 | −4 | 26 |
| 13 | Pelister | 30 | 10 | 6 | 14 | 33 | 41 | −8 | 26 |
| 14 | 11 Oktomvri | 30 | 10 | 6 | 14 | 52 | 69 | −17 | 26 |
| 15 | Ohrid (R) | 30 | 11 | 3 | 16 | 33 | 54 | −21 | 25 |
| 16 | Ljuboten (R) | 30 | 9 | 2 | 19 | 41 | 65 | −24 | 20 |

(C) Champions; (R) Relegated
