= Betim Aliju =

Macedonian retired football player

Personal information
- Date of birth: 17 March 1989 (age 37)
- Place of birth: Skopje, SFR Yugoslavia
- Height: 1.77 m (5 ft 10 in)
- Position: Defender

Youth career
- Sloga Jugomagnat

Senior career*
Years	Team	Apps	(Gls)
2009	KuPS	8	(0)
2010	Metalurg Skopje	1	(0)
2010–2011	Besa Kavajë	9	(0)
2011	Shkëndija	3	(0)
2011	Teteks	1	(0)

International career^{‡}
2011	Macedonia U21	3	(0)
- * Club domestic league appearances and goals as of 27 July 2014 ‡ National team caps and goals as of 27 July 2014

Betim Aliju (Macedonian: Бетим Алиу; born 17 March 1989) is a Macedonian retired football player of Albanian descent.

== Honours ==
=== Club ===
Besa Kavajë

- Albanian Superliga (1): 2010-2011

KF Shkëndija

- First Macedonian Football League (1): 2010-2011

== Career statistics ==
=== Club ===
Updated 27 July 2014.

Club	Season	League		Cup		Continental		Total	
Club	Season	Apps	Goals	Apps	Goals	Apps	Goals	Apps	Goals
Kuopion Palloseura	2009	8	0	—		—		8	0
FK Metalurg Skopje	2009-2010	1	0	—		—		1	0
Besa Kavajë	2010-2011	9	0	—		2	0	11	0
FK Shkëndija	2010-2011	3	0	—		—		3	0
FK Teteks	2011-2012	1	0	—		—		1	0

=== International ===
Updated 27 July 2014.

National team	Year	Apps	Goals
Macedonia u21	2011	3	0
Total		3	0
