= Dushko Trajchevski =

Macedonian footballer

Personal information
- Full name: Dushko Trajchevski; Душко Трајчевски
- Date of birth: 1 November 1990 (age 36)
- Place of birth: Skopje, SR Macedonia, SFR Yugoslavia
- Height: 1.84 m (6 ft 1/2 in)
- Position: Defensive midfielder

Team information
- Current team: Skopje

Senior career*
Years	Team	Apps	(Gls)
2010–2011	Lokomotiva Skopje		
2011–2012	Teteks	38	(2)
2013–2018	FK Rabotnički	146	(9)
2018–2019	Alki Oroklini	26	(1)
2019–2024	Doxa Katokopias	138	(2)
2024–2025	Gostivar	13	(0)
2025–2026	Dinamo Jug	11	(0)
2026–	Skopje	0	(0)

International career^{‡}
2015–2020	Macedonia	6	(0)
- * Club domestic league appearances and goals as of 10 March 2026 ‡ National team caps and goals as of 19 November 2020

Dushko Trajchevski^{[a]} (Macedonian: Душко Трајчевски; born 1 November 1990) is a Macedonian footballer who plays as a defensive midfielder for Macedonian Second League club Skopje.

== Club career ==
Trajchevski began his senior career with Lokomotiva Skopje in the 2010–11 season, where he made his first appearances in Macedonian football.

In 2011 he signed for FK Teteks, playing 38 matches and scoring twice during the 2011–12 campaign.

In 2013, Trajchevski moved to Rabotnicki, where he became a regular starter over five seasons. He made 146 league appearances and scored nine goals, winning the Macedonian First League in 2013–14 and the Macedonian Football Cup in 2013–14 and 2014–15.

In 2018 he moved abroad for the first time, joining Alki Oroklini in the Cypriot First Division, where he made 26 league appearances and scored once.

The following year he joined Doxa Katokopias, also in Cyprus. Over five seasons with the club he made 138 league appearances and scored twice in the Cypriot First Division.

In July 2024, Trajchevski returned to Macedonia, signing with FK Gostivar in the Macedonian First League, where he made 13 league appearances during the 2024–25 season.

Reports in July 2025 linked him with a free transfer to Serbian club Dinamo Jug, although this has not been officially confirmed in league records.

== International career ==
He made his senior debut for Macedonia in a March 2015 friendly match against Australia and has earned a total of 5 caps, scoring no goals. His final international was a June 2017 friendly against Turkey.

== Notes ==
a.	Old romanized spelling: Duško Trajčevski.

== Honours ==
Rabotnicki

- Macedonian First League: 2013–14
- Macedonian Football Cup: 2013–14, 2014–15
