= 1954–55 Macedonian Republic League =

Macedonian Republic League
- Season: 1954–55

The 1954–55 Macedonian Republic League was the 11th since its establishment. Metalec Skopje won their first championship title.

== Participating teams ==
Club	City
Belasica	Strumica
Bratstvo	Gostivar
Bregalnica	Shtip
Karaorman	Struga
Kozhuf	Gevgelija
Metalec	Skopje
Pobeda (P)	Prilep
Pobeda (V)	Veles
Prespa	Resen
Rabotnik	Bitola
Sloga	Skopje
Tikvesh	Kavadarci

== Final table ==
Pos	Team	Pld	W	D	L	GF	GA	GD	Pts
1	Metalec Skopje	21	14	3	4	62	22	+40	31
2	Pobeda Prilep	21	12	4	5	63	29	+34	28
3	Tikvesh Kavadarci	21	12	4	5	45	30	+15	28
4	Rabotnik Bitola	21	11	5	5	56	33	+23	27
5	Pobeda Veles	21	10	2	9	60	56	+4	22
6	Bregalnica Shtip	21	9	2	10	52	58	−6	20
7	Belasica Strumica	21	8	3	10	35	46	−11	19
8	Kozhuf Gevgelija	21	4	10	7	37	43	−6	18
9	Bratstvo Gostivar	21	8	2	11	36	48	−12	18
10	Sloga Skopje	21	5	5	11	29	43	−14	15
11	Prespa Resen	21	4	2	15	27	70	−43	10
12	Karaorman Struga (Note: Karaorman Struga expelled from the league.)	0	–	–	–	–	–	—	0
