= FC Lokomotiv Sofia in European football =

International record of a Bulgarian football club

The Bulgarian football club FC Lokomotiv Sofia has frequently competed in international tournaments within Europe, in particular the UEFA Champions League, the UEFA Cup Winners' Cup, and most recently the UEFA Europa League. Out of 50 appearances in these competitions since 1964, the team has won 18, drawn 12 and lost 20.

== Total statistics ==
Competition	S	P	W	D	L	GF	GA	GD
UEFA Champions League / European Cup	2	8	3	1	4	19	21	– 2
UEFA Cup Winners' Cup / European Cup Winners' Cup	3	8	3	0	5	8	17	– 9
UEFA Europa League / UEFA Cup	8	34	12	11	11	49	37	+ 12
Total	13	50	18	12	20	76	75	+ 1

== Statistics by country ==
Country	Club	P	W	D	L	GF	GA	GD
Azerbaijan	Neftchi Baku	2	1	0	1	7	2	+ 5
Subtotal		2	1	0	1	7	2	+ 5
Belgium	Anderlecht	2	0	0	2	1	8	– 7
Subtotal		2	0	0	2	1	8	– 7
Cyprus	APOEL	2	1	1	0	6	4	+ 2
Subtotal		2	1	1	0	6	4	+ 2
Denmark	Odense	2	1	1	0	4	3	+ 1
Subtotal		2	1	1	0	4	3	+ 1
France	Monaco	2	1	0	1	5	4	+ 1
France	Paris Saint-Germain	2	1	0	1	2	5	– 3
France	Rennes	2	1	0	1	3	4	– 1
Subtotal		6	3	0	3	10	13	– 3
(Georgia (country)) Georgia / Soviet Union	Dinamo Tbilisi	2	1	0	1	3	4	– 1
Subtotal		2	1	0	1	3	4	– 1
Germany / West Germany	Köln	2	0	0	2	0	5	– 5
Germany / West Germany	Stuttgart	2	0	0	2	1	4	– 3
Subtotal		4	0	0	4	1	9	– 8
Hungary	Ferencváros	2	1	0	1	3	2	+ 1
Hungary	Győri ETO	2	1	0	1	7	8	– 1
Subtotal		4	2	0	2	10	10	0
Israel	Bnei Yehuda Tel Aviv	2	2	0	0	6	0	+ 6
Subtotal		2	2	0	0	6	0	+ 6
Netherlands	Feyenoord	2	0	2	0	2	2	0
Subtotal		2	0	2	0	2	2	0
Poland	Śląsk Wrocław	2	0	2	0	0	0	0
Subtotal		2	0	2	0	0	0	0
Republic of Ireland	Derry City	2	1	0	1	2	1	+ 1
Subtotal		2	1	0	1	2	1	+ 1
(North Macedonia) Republic of Macedonia	Makedonija GP	2	1	1	0	3	1	+ 2
(North Macedonia) Republic of Macedonia	FK Metalurg Skopje	2	1	1	0	3	2	+ 1
Subtotal		4	2	2	0	6	3	+ 3
Romania	Oțelul Galați	2	1	1	0	3	1	+ 2
Romania	Rapid București	2	0	0	2	0	2	– 2
Subtotal		4	1	1	2	3	3	0
Serbia	Borac Čačak	2	0	1	1	1	2	– 1
Subtotal		2	0	1	1	1	2	– 1
Sweden	Halmstad	2	1	0	1	3	3	0
Sweden	Malmö	2	1	0	1	8	5	+ 3
Subtotal		4	2	0	2	11	8	+ 3
Switzerland	Neuchâtel Xamax	2	0	2	0	1	1	0
Subtotal		2	0	2	0	1	1	0
Ukraine / Soviet Union	Dynamo Kiev	2	1	0	1	2	2	0
Subtotal		2	1	0	1	2	2	0
Total		50	18	12	20	76	75	+ 1

== Statistics by competition ==
=== UEFA Champions League / European Cup ===
Season	Round	Club	Home	Away	Aggregate
1964–65	Preliminary round	(Sweden) Malmö	8–3	0–2	8–5
1964–65	First round	(Hungary) Győri Vasas ETO	4–3	3–5	7–8
1978–79	First round	(Denmark) Odense	2–1	2–2	4–3
1978–79	Second round	(West Germany) Köln	0–1	0–4	0–5

=== UEFA Cup Winners' Cup / European Cup Winners' Cup ===
Season	Round	Club	Home	Away	Aggregate
1977–78	First round	(Belgium) Anderlecht	1–6	0–2	1–8
1982–83	First round	(France) Paris Saint-Germain	1–0	1–5	2–5
1995–96	Qualifying round	(Republic of Ireland) Derry City	2–0	0–1	2–1
1995–96	First round	(Sweden) Halmstad	3–1	0–2	3–3 (a)

=== UEFA Europa League / UEFA Cup ===
Season	Round	Club	Home	Away	Aggregate
1979–80	First round	(Hungary) Ferencvárosi Torna Club	3–0	0–2	3–2
1979–80	Second round	(France) Monaco	4–2	1–2	5–4
1979–80	Third round	(Soviet Union) Dynamo Kyiv	1–0	1–2	2–2 (a)
1979–80	Quarter-finals	(West Germany) Stuttgart	0–1	1–3	1–4
1985–86	First round	(Cyprus) APOEL	4–2 (a.e.t.)	2–2	6–4
1985–86	Second round	(Switzerland) Neuchâtel Xamax	1–1	0–0	1–1 (a)
1987–88	First round	(Soviet Union) Dinamo Tbilisi	3–1	0–3	3–4
1996–97	Preliminary round	(Azerbaijan) Neftchi Baku	6–0	1–2	7–2
1996–97	Qualifying round	(Romania) Rapid Bucharest	0–1	0–1	0–2
2006–07	First qualifying round	(North Macedonia) Makedonija GP	2–0	1–1	3–1
2006–07	Second qualifying round	(Israel) Bnei Yehuda Tel Aviv	4–0	2–0	6–0
2006–07	First round	(Netherlands) Feyenoord	2–2	0–0	2–2 (a)
2007–08	Second qualifying round	(Romania) Oţelul Galaţi	3–1	0–0	3–1
2007–08	First round	(France) Rennes	1–3	2–1	3–4
2008–09	Second qualifying round	(Serbia) Borac Čačak	1–1	0–1	1–2
2011–12	Second qualifying round	(North Macedonia) Metalurg Skopje	3–2	0–0	3–2
2011–12	Third qualifying round	(Poland) Śląsk Wrocław	0–0 (a.e.t.)	0–0	0–0 (3–4 p)
