= Vlatko Kostov =

Macedonian football manager

Personal information
- Full name: Vlatko Kostov
- Date of birth: 1 September 1965 (age 61)
- Place of birth: Štip, SR Macedonia, SFR Yugoslavia
- Position: Midfielder

Youth career
- Bregalnica Štip

Senior career*
Years	Team	Apps	(Gls)
1984–1986	Bregalnica Štip	60	(3)
1986–1988	Lokomotiv Sofia	26	(1)
1988–1990	Pelister Bitola	52	(8)
1990–1993	Vardar Skopje	39	(6)

Managerial career
- 1997–1998: Osogovo
- 1998–1999: Sasa
- 1999–2001: Kumanovo
- 2003–2004: Bregalnica Štip
- 2004–2005: Vlazrimi
- 2006–2007: Renova
- 2007–2008: Turnovo
- 2003–2009: Macedonia U21 (assistant)
- 2008–2010: Renova
- 2009–2011: Macedonia (assistant)
- 2010: Macedonia (caretaker)
- 2010–2011: Rabotnički Skopje
- 2011–2012: FK Renova
- 2013: Al-Raed
- 2014: Al-Raed
- 2015: Bregalnica Štip
- * Club domestic league appearances and goals as of 31 August 2009 ‡ National team caps and goals as of 31 August 2009

Vlatko Kostov (Macedonian: Влатко Костов; born 1 September 1965 in Štip, Yugoslavia) is a former Yugoslav and Macedonian football midfielder who is an assistant manager on the Macedonia national football team.

He used to manage FK Renova, who became champions in Macedonia for the 2009-2010 season. After the year, Renova and Kostov could not reach a deal and they parted. Kostov became top assistant to the Macedonian national team manager Mirsad Jonuz.

In 2012, he led Renova to the Macedonian Cup final, which they won 3–1 in his home town of Štip.

== Honours and awards ==
As a player:

- Vardar Skopje
  - First Macedonian Football League: 1
    - Winner: 1993

As a coach:

- Renova
  - First Macedonian Football League: 1
    - Winner: 2009-10
  - Macedonian Cup: 1
    - Winners: 2011-12
- Osogovo
  - Second Macedonian Football League: 1
    - Winner: 1997-1998
- Kumanovo
  - Second Macedonian Football League: 1
    - Winner: 1999-2000
- Bregalnica Štip
  - Second Macedonian Football League: 1
    - Winner: 2003-2004
- Turnovo
  - Second Macedonian Football League: 1
    - Winner: 2007-2008
