= FK Bregalnica =

FK Bregalnica may refer to two football clubs in the Republic of Macedonia:

- FK Bregalnica Delčevo
- FK Bregalnica Štip
