= FK Ohrid Lote =

ФК Охрид Лоте FK Ohrid Lote
- Full name: Fudbalski klub Ohrid Lote
- Founded: 2009
- Dissolved: 2012
- Ground: SRC Biljanini Izvori
- Capacity: 3,000
- Final season 2011–12: 16th (Relegated from Second League)
| Home colours | Away colours |

FK Ohrid Lote (Macedonian: ФК Охрид Лоте) was a football club from the city of Ohrid, North Macedonia.

== History ==
The club was founded in 2009. They was played at the SRC Biljanini Izvori, which has a capacity of 3,000 seats. The nickname of Ohrid Lote was "developers".

In the club's first season as Ohrid Lote, it was champion of the Macedonian Third League – South West Region, directly qualifying for promotion to the Macedonian Second League. Ohrid Lote won the 2010 Ohrid municipal soccer cup, defeating defending champion Ohrid 2004 2–0 with two goals from Nikolce Stojkovski.

Ohrid Lote participated in the 2010–11 Macedonian Cup, losing 3–1 away to Bregalnica Štip in the first round.
