= Betim (disambiguation) =

Betim may refer to the following:

- Betim, Brazilian city

== Given name ==
- Betim Aliju (born 1989), Macedonian football player
- Betim Halimi (born 1996), Kosovan footballer
- Betim Muço (1947–2015), Albanian writer, poet, translator, and seismologist

== Other ==
- Rafael Betim Marti (born 1987), Brazilian footballer
