= Goran Siljanovski =

Macedonian footballer

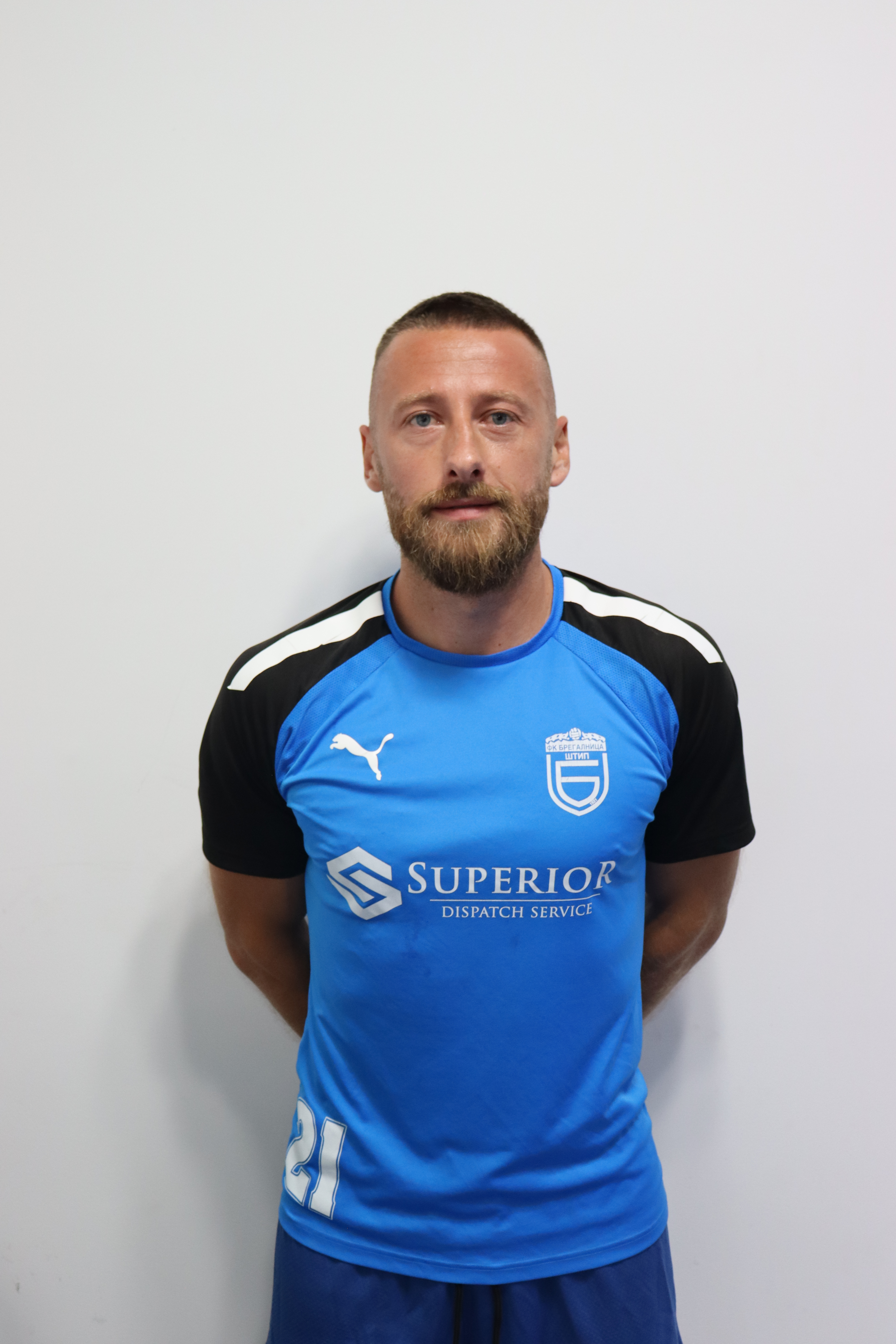
- FK Bregalnica 2008. by Dandarmkd

Personal information
- Full name: Goran Siljanovski; Горан Силјановски
- Date of birth: 1 July 1990 (age 36)
- Place of birth: Tetovo, SR Macedonia, SFR Yugoslavia
- Height: 1.77 m (5 ft 9 1/2 in)
- Position: Right-back

Team information
- Current team: Besa
- Number: 25

Youth career
- 200x–2008: Makedonija Gj. P.

Senior career*
Years	Team	Apps	(Gls)
2007–2009	Makedonija	7	(0)
2009–2010	Vardar	21	(1)
2010–2011	Teteks	13	(3)
2011–2013	Renova	61	(5)
2013–2017	Rabotnički	82	(1)
2017–2019	Flamurtari	51	(1)
2019–2021	Rabotnički	44	(1)
2021–2022	Dinamo Tirana	33	(0)
2022–2024	Bregalnica	50	(1)
2024–	Besa	23	(0)

International career^{‡}
2008–2012	Macedonia U21	18	(0)
2014–	Macedonia	4	(0)
- * Club domestic league appearances and goals as of 18 March 2025 ‡ National team caps and goals as of 30 March 2016

Goran Siljanovski (Macedonian: Горан Силјановски; born 1 July 1990 in Tetovo) is a Macedonian professional footballer who plays as a right-back for Besa and Macedonian national team.

== Club career ==
On 14 June 2017, Siljanovski moved for the first time aboard to sign with Albanian Superliga side Flamurtari Vlorë.

== International career ==
Siljanovski made his senior debut on 18 June 2014 in a friendly against China, playing the first half as the match finished in a 2–0 defeat. He has 4 total appearances for the Macedonian national team.

== Honours ==
Rabotnički

- Macedonian First Football League: 2013–14
- Macedonian Football Cup: 2013–14, 2014–15

Renova

- Macedonian Football Cup: 2011–12
