= Dančo Celeski =

Macedonian footballer, born 1967

- Dančo Celeski playing for Macedonia

Personal information
- Full name: Dančo Celeski
- Date of birth: 9 September 1967 (age 59)
- Place of birth: Ohrid, SR Macedonia, SFR Yugoslavia
- Height: 1.85 m (6 ft 1 in)
- Position: Goalkeeper

Youth career
- FK Debrca

Senior career*
Years	Team	Apps	(Gls)
- Zastava Belčišta
1993–1996	Ohrid		
1997	Makedonija		
1997	Kayserispor	7	(0)
1998–2001	Nyíregyháza	75	(0)
2001–2002	Karaorman		

International career
1994–1997	Macedonia	22	(0)

Managerial career
- 2003–2005: Macedonia (GK Coach)
- 2006–2009: Macedonia (GK Coach)
- Ohrid
- * Club domestic league appearances and goals

Dančo Celeski (Macedonian: Данчо Целески; born 9 September 1967) is a retired Macedonian football goalkeeper, who last played for FK Karaorman.

== Club career ==
Celeski started his career with Zastava Belchishta and had spells in Hungary and Turkey.

== International career ==
He made his senior debut for Macedonia in an October 1994 European Championship qualification match against Spain in Skopje and has earned a total of 22 caps, scoring no goals. His final international was an October 1997 FIFA World Cup qualification match against Lithuania.

== External sources ==
- Profile at MacedonianFootball.com (in English)
- Dančo Celeski at National-Football-Teams.com
