= Genc Iseni =

Kosovar Albanian footballer (born 1983)

Personal information
- Full name: Genc Iseni
- Date of birth: 28 March 1983 (age 43)
- Place of birth: Ferizaj, SAP Kosovo, SFR Yugoslavia
- Position: Striker

Youth career
- Ferizaj

Senior career*
Years	Team	Apps	(Gls)
2004	Ferizaj	14	(2)
2004–2008	Renova	45	(19)
2008	Ethnikos Achna	15	(1)
2008–2009	Milano Kumanovo	19	(6)
2009–2010	Gramozi	14	(3)
2010	Teteks	21	(6)
2011	Renova	10	(2)
2011	Shkendija	7	(1)
2011–2012	Bregalnica	21	(11)
2012	Rabotnički	16	(8)
2013	Teteks	9	(0)
- * Club domestic league appearances and goals

Genc Iseni or Hyseni (Note: Albanian spelling: Genc Iseni or Genc Hyseni, Serbo-Croat Cyrillic spelling: Генц Исени.) (born 28 March 1983, in Ferizaj) is a Kosovar Albanian retired footballer. Iseni grew up as a player in the Kosovar league KF Ferizaj, where he played starting from childhood.

He played for four years for Macedonian club KF Renova from Džepčište. He scored one goal against HNK Rijeka in four 2008 UEFA Intertoto Cup matches before signing a three-year contract with Ethnikos Achna.

== Honours ==
Teteks

- Macedonian Football Cup: 2010–11
