= Aleksandar Tenekedžiev =

Macedonian footballer

Personal information
- Full name: Aleksandar Tenekedžiev
- Date of birth: 13 March 1986 (age 40)
- Place of birth: Valandovo, SFR Yugoslavia
- Height: 1.78 m (5 ft 10 in)
- Position: Midfielder

Youth career
- Horizont Turnovo

Senior career*
Years	Team	Apps	(Gls)
2003–2005	Slavia Sofia	1	(0)
2005–2007	Shkëndija		
2008–2009	Horizont Turnovo	42	(1)
2010–2012	Metalurg Skopje	56	(3)
2013–2014	Horizont Turnovo	35	(0)
2015	FC Grenchen		
- * Club domestic league appearances and goals as of 24 December 2013

Aleksandar Tenekedžiev (Macedonian: Александар Тенекеџиев; born 13 March 1986 in Valandovo) is a Macedonian footballer, who most recently played for FC Grenchen.

== Club careеr ==
He left in January 2010 his club FK Turnovo and signed for FK Metalurg Skopje.
