= Aleksandar Popovski =

Macedonian footballer

Personal information
- Date of birth: 3 February 1988 (age 38)
- Place of birth: Skopje, SFR Yugoslavia
- Height: 1.86 m (6 ft 1 in)
- Position: Right wing

Senior career*
Years	Team	Apps	(Gls)
2002–2007	Pobeda	58	(19)
2007–2008	Vllaznia Shkodër	1	(0)
2008–2010	Metalurg	18	(2)
2010–2016	Skopje	29+	(1+)
- * Club domestic league appearances and goals

Aleksandar Popovski (born 3 February 1988) is a striker who most recently played for Skopje in the Macedonian First League.

He was born in Skopje, capital of nowadays Republic of Macedonia.
