= 2003–04 Macedonian Second Football League =

Macedonian Second League
- Season: 2003–04
- Champions: Bregalnica Shtip
- Promoted: Bregalnica Shtip; Shkëndija Tetovo
- Relegated: Borec; Novaci; Osogovo; Alumina; Lozar; Kumanovo; 11 Oktomvri; Zletovica

The 2003–04 Macedonian Second Football League was the twelfth season since its establishment. It began on 9 August 2003 and ended on 2 June 2004.

== Participating teams ==
Location of teams in 2003–04 Macedonian Second League

Club	City
11 Oktomvri	Prilep
Alumina	Skopje
Borec	Veles
Bratstvo	Resen
Bregalnica	Shtip
Kumanovo	Kumanovo
Lozar	Demir Kapija
Makedonija G.P.	Skopje
Novaci	Novaci
Osogovo	Kochani
Pelister	Bitola
Skopje	Skopje
Shkëndija Arachinovo	Arachinovo
Shkëndija Tetovo	Tetovo
Teteks	Tetovo
Turnovo	Turnovo
Vëllazërimi	Kichevo
Zletovica	Zletovo

== League standing ==
Pos	Team	Pld	W	D	L	GF	GA	GD	Pts	Promotion or relegation
1	Bregalnica Shtip (C, P)	32	23	4	5	73	38	+35	73	Promotion to Macedonian First League
2	Shkëndija Tetovo (P)	32	19	5	8	69	44	+25	62	Promotion to Macedonian First League
3	Skopje	32	17	2	13	46	45	+1	53	
4	Teteks	32	14	10	8	53	30	+23	52	
5	Turnovo	32	15	7	10	53	39	+14	52	
6	Pelister	32	16	4	12	48	42	+6	52	
7	Makedonija G.P.	32	15	6	11	50	46	+4	51	
8	Vëllazërimi	32	15	5	12	51	45	+6	50	
9	Shkëndija Arachinovo	32	16	2	14	48	49	−1	50	
10	Bratstvo Resen	32	14	6	12	54	46	+8	48	
11	Borec (R)	32	13	8	11	50	49	+1	47	Relegation to Macedonian Third League
12	Novaci (R)	32	14	1	17	44	50	−6	43	Relegation to Macedonian Third League
13	Osogovo (R)	32	12	3	17	50	60	−10	39	Relegation to Macedonian Third League
14	Alumina (R)	32	10	4	18	40	66	−26	34	Relegation to Macedonian Third League
15	Lozar (R)	32	8	7	17	30	42	−12	31	Relegation to Macedonian Third League
16	Kumanovo (R)	32	6	5	21	27	63	−36	23	Relegation to Macedonian Third League
17	11 Oktomvri (R)	32	4	3	25	40	72	−32	15	Relegation to Macedonian Third League
–	Zletovica (Note: Zletovica was removed from competition after 6th round. All matches annulled.) (R)	0	0	0	0	0	0	0	0	Withdrew from the competition

Source: MacedonianFootball.com, RSSSF.org
Rules for classification: 1) Points; 2) Head-to-head points; 3) Head-to-head goal difference; 4) Head-to-head away goals scored
(C) Champions; (P) Promoted; (R) Relegated

== Results ==
Home \ Away	OKT	ALU	BOR	BRA	BRE	KUM	LOZ	MGP	NOV	OSO	PEL	SKA	SKE	SKO	TET	TUR	VLZ
11 Oktomvri	—	2–0	2–3	2–3	1–2	5–1	1–3	0–1	4–5	2–2	0–2	2–1	4–0	0–1	1–2	1–2	1–1
Alumina	2–0	—	2–2	2–1	0–1	2–1	2–0	0–0	3–1	2–1	1–2	1–0	3–4	4–2	3–3	4–7	1–1
Borec	2–0	3–0	—	1–0	0–1	3–1	1–1	2–5	5–0	2–1	1–3	1–0	3–2	0–3	1–1	2–0	2–0
Bratstvo Resen	3–0	5–1	1–1	—	1–1	3–0	1–0	1–0	3–1	0–1	4–2	4–1	3–4	3–0	3–2	2–0	2–0
Bregalnica Shtip	5–3	4–0	4–1	3–1	—	5–0	3–1	4–3	2–1	2–0	6–1	1–0	3–2	2–0	1–0	2–1	2–0
Kumanovo	1–1	0–1	0–0	0–1	1–2	—	3–1	0–1	1–2	3–2	2–1	4–1	1–2	0–3	0–5	3–1	0–1
Lozar	2–0	1–0	1–3	0–0	0–2	0–1	—	2–0	0–1	7–1	1–1	0–2	2–1	1–2	0–0	1–1	1–0
Makedonija	4–2	4–2	2–2	2–2	1–1	1–0	2–1	—	1–0	2–1	2–0	3–4	4–2	1–0	1–2	1–1	2–1
Novaci	1–0	4–1	1–0	3–0	3–2	0–0	2–3	1–0	—	3–1	0–1	2–0	0–1	2–1	3–2	2–0	1–2
Osogovo	2–1	0–1	1–2	1–0	4–0	6–3	0–0	0–3	5–1	—	0–1	2–1	2–1	2–0	1–1	2–0	4–0
Pelister	4–1	4–0	3–2	0–0	1–3	2–0	2–0	2–0	1–0	4–0	—	2–1	2–2	2–1	0–2	4–1	0–0
Shkëndija Arachinovo	3–0	3–1	1–1	3–1	2–1	3–0	2–0	0–0	1–0	2–1	1–0	—	1–0	3–1	2–1	3–2	1–0
Shkëndija Tetovo	2–1	3–0	3–1	1–1	2–1	1–1	1–0	4–0	2–1	6–1	4–1	4–2	—	4–0	1–1	2–0	2–0
Skopje	3–2	2–0	1–1	2–1	1–2	3–0	1–0	3–0	2–1	1–4	1–0	1–0	0–2	—	1–0	1–1	3–2
Teteks	5–1	1–0	3–0	2–1	2–2	3–0	0–0	1–2	2–1	2–1	2–0	4–1	0–0	1–2	—	0–0	3–0
Turnovo	3–0	1–0	2–0	6–1	2–2	0–0	3–0	2–1	2–1	3–1	1–0	5–1	2–0	0–1	1–0	—	1–1
Vëllazërimi	1–0	3–1	4–2	4–2	3–1	1–0	3–1	3–1	2–0	4–0	3–0	4–2	3–4	4–3	0–0	0–2	—

Source: RSSSF.org
Legend: Blue = home team win; Yellow = draw; Red = away team win.

== See also ==
- 2003–04 Macedonian Football Cup
- 2003–04 Macedonian First Football League
