= Gordan Zdravkov =

Macedonian footballer

Personal information
- Full name: Gordan Zdravkov
- Date of birth: 26 April 1959 (age 67)
- Place of birth: Sveti Nikole, PR Macedonia, FPR Yugoslavia
- Position: Midfielder

Team information
- Current team: Plachkovica (manager)

Youth career
- Ovche Pole

Senior career*
Years	Team	Apps	(Gls)
1975–1977	Ovche Pole		
1977–1980	Bregalnica Štip	22	(2)
1980–1986	Vardar	116	(30)
1986–1987	VOEST Linz	19	(2)
- Balkan

Managerial career
- Ovche Pole
- 2005: Bregalnica Štip
- Shkëndija (assistant)
- 2008–2009: Rabotnichki (assistant)
- 2009: Rabotnichki
- 2010–2011: Belasica
- 2011–2012: Turnovo
- 2013: Pelister
- 2013: Napredok
- 2014: Sileks
- 2016: Sileks
- 2018–: Plačkovica
- * Club domestic league appearances and goals

Gordan Zdravkov (Macedonian: Гордан Здравков; born 26 April 1959) is a Macedonian football coach and former player. He was a currently assistant coach of FK Ovce Pole.

== External sources ==
- Gordan Zdravkov at WorldFootball.net
