= Dragan Bočeski =

Macedonian footballer and coach

Personal information
- Full name: Dragan Bočeski
- Date of birth: 24 November 1963 (age 62)
- Place of birth: Ohrid, SFR Yugoslavia
- Position: Midfielder

Senior career*
| Years | Team | Apps | (Gls) |
| 1983–1984 | Željezničar | 9 | (1) |
| 1985 | Spartak Subotica | 3 | (0) |
| 1985–1989 | Pelister | 51 | (8) |
| 1989–1992 | Vardar | 40 | (3) |
| 1992–1993 | PAS Giannina | 6 | (0) |
| 1993–1996 | Ohrid | 55 | (11) |
| Total | | 109 | (94) |

Managerial career
- 2002: Osogovo
- 2005–2008: Napredok
- 2008: Turnovo
- 2008–2013: Napredok
- –2011: Macedonia U19
- 2013–2014: Pelister
- 2019-: Ohrid
- * Club domestic league appearances and goals

Dragan Bočeski (Macedonian: Драган Бочески; born 24 November 1963) is a Macedonian football coach and former player who coached FK Pelister. He played as a midfielder. (Note: Dragan Bočeski at WorldFootball.net)

== Playing career ==
As a player, Bočeski played with FK Željezničar Sarajevo and FK Vardar in the Yugoslav First League, and with FK Spartak Subotica and FK Pelister in Yugoslav Second League.

== Managerial career ==
Bočeski later managed Macedonia U19, FK Napredok and FK Pelister.
