= Lokomotiva Stadium, Skopje =

Multi-use stadium in Skopje, North Macedonia

Lokomotiva Stadium (Macedonian Cyrillic: Стадион Локомотива, Stadion Lokomotiva) is a multi-use stadium in Skopje, North Macedonia. It is currently used mostly for football matches and is the home of FK Lokomotiva Skopje. The stadium seats 500 people.
