= FK Napredok =

- Full name: Fudbalski klub Napredok
- Founded: 1928; 98 years ago
- Ground: Gradski stadion Kičevo
- Capacity: 5,000
- Chairman: Ilija Bozhinoski
- Manager: Boban Dujkovikj
- League: Macedonian Third League (Region 5)
- 2025–26: 5th
Home colours	Away colours

FK Napredok (Macedonian: ФК Напредок) is a football club from Kičevo, North Macedonia. They are currently competing in the Macedonian Third League (Region 5).

== History ==
The club was founded in 1928, under the name Jadran. After World War II, it had the name Jančica until 1952 when it got its current name FK Napredok. Team colors are blue and white, while its biggest accomplishment was finalist in the 2003–04 Macedonian Cup.

== Supporters ==
FK Napredok supporters are called the Gjaoli (Devils).

== Honours ==
- (North Macedonia) Macedonian Second League
  - Winners (1): 1998–99
  - Runners-up (3): 1995–96, 2000–01, 2005–06
- (North Macedonia) Macedonian Football Cup
  - Runners-up (1): 2003–04

== Recent seasons ==
Season	League									Cup
Season	Division	P	W	D	L	F	A	Pts	Pos	Cup
1992–93	2. MFL	38	16	7	15	54	41	39	8th	
1993–94	2. MFL West	26	12	2	12	47	39	26	6th	
1994–95	2. MFL West	32	14	7	11	58	48	49	6th	
1995–96	2. MFL West	30	16	4	10	40	25	52	2nd	
1996–97	2. MFL West	29	12	6	11	46	35	42	7th	
1997–98	2. MFL West	30	12	5	13	32	35	41	7th	
1998–99	2. MFL West	30	21	6	3	65	21	69	1st ↑	
1999–00	1. MFL	26	4	8	14	30	48	20	13th ↓	R2
2000–01	2. MFL	34	23	3	8	74	43	72	2nd ↑	R2
2001–02	1. MFL	20	11	2	7	34	33	35	8th	R1
2002–03	1. MFL	33	13	3	17	39	41	42	7th	QF
2003–04	1. MFL	33	12	5	16	51	52	41	9th	RU
2004–05	1. MFL	33	1	4	28	17	99	7	12th ↓	R1
2005–06	2. MFL	30	15	7	8	44	39	52	2nd ↑	R2
2006–07	1. MFL	33	12	9	12	50	47	45	7th	R1
2007–08	1. MFL	33	11	9	13	38	49	42	8th	R2
2008–09	1. MFL	30	4	9	17	26	52	21	11th ↓	R1
2009–10	2. MFL	26	17	3	6	55	32	54	3rd ↑	R1
2010–11	1. MFL	33	10	7	16	30	48	37	10th	SF
2011–12	1. MFL	33	12	6	15	37	51	42	7th	QF
2012–13	1. MFL	33	12	7	14	29	39	43	7th	R1
2013–14	1. MFL	33	3	9	21	27	75	18	11th ↓	QF
2014–15	2. MFL	27	2	3	22	23	78	9	10th ↓	R2
2015–16	3. MFL West	21	12	1	18	51	27	37	3rd	PR
2016–17	3. MFL West	25	7	4	14	40	56	25	11th	PR
2017–18	3. MFL West	23	9	4	10	56	53	31	5th	PR
2018–19	3. MFL West	24	14	2	8	50	33	44	4th	PR
2019–20^{1}	3. MFL West	11	4	2	5	18	21	14	8th	PR
2020–21^{1}	3. MFL West	14	1	4	9	15	31	7	10th	PR
2021–22	3. MFL West	21	9	3	9	40	33	30	6th	PR
2022–23	3. MFL West	12	6	0	6	21	25	18	3rd	PR
2023–24	3. MFL West	20	5	0	15	29	55	15	7th	PR
2024–25	3. MFL West	24	9	2	13	38	56	29	10th	PR
2025–26	3. MFL West	20	10	1	9	42	36	31	5th	PR

^{1}The 2019–20 and 2020–21 seasons were abandoned due to the COVID-19 pandemic in North Macedonia.

== Historical list of coaches ==
- (North Macedonia) Ilija Dimoski (1999)
- (North Macedonia) Jovan Manakovski (2000 - 2001)
- (North Macedonia) Naum Ljamcevski (2001 - 2002)
- (North Macedonia) Dragan Bočeski (2003)
- (North Macedonia) Zoran Gjorgieski (2004 - 2005)
- (North Macedonia) Dragan Bočeski (1 Jul 2005 - 30 Jun 2008)
- (North Macedonia) Dragan Mateski (1 Jul 2008 - 16 Dec 2008)
- (North Macedonia) Dragan Bočeski (17 Dec 2008 - Jun 2009)
- (North Macedonia) Baze Lazarevski (Jul 2009 - 5 Mar 2010)
- (North Macedonia) Dragan Bočeski (6 Mar 2010 - 27 Jun 2013)
- (North Macedonia) Gordan Zdravkov (Jul 2013 - Aug 2013)
- (North Macedonia) Gorazd Mihajlov (23 Aug 2013 - 28 Dec 2013)
- (North Macedonia) Dragan Mateski (25 Mar 2014 - 2015)
