= FK Lokomotiva Skopje =

Lokomotiva Skopje
- Full name: Fudbalski klub Lokomotiva Skopje
- Nickname(s): Lokosi
- Founded: 1954; 71 years ago
- Ground: Lokomotiva Stadium
- Capacity: 500
- Chairman: Urosh Matevski Bento
- Manager: Martin Hristov
- League: OFS Skopje
- 2022–23: Macedonian Second League, 14th (relegated)
Home colours	Away colours

FK Lokomotiva Skopje (Macedonian: ФК Локомотива Скопје) is a football club based in the Karpoš neighborhood of Skopje, North Macedonia. They are currently competing in the OFS Skopje.

== History ==
The club was founded in 1954, as the railway club, therefore it was sometimes called ŽFK Lokomotiva. In the past they played their matches on the home ground of FK Rabotnički, and so often youth players from Rabotnički came to the club for development. Many decades later it moved to the current stadium location in Skopje settlement Karpoš. To the older generation it was known as Komunalec, because on that field played FK Komunalec, and also the club FK Vanila, but now neither team exists anymore. Lokomotiva for the first time in its history during the 2007/08 season, played in the Macedonian Second League.

== Current squad ==
As of 12 July 2023.

Note: Flags indicate national team as defined under FIFA eligibility rules; some limited exceptions apply. Players may hold more than one non-FIFA nationality.

No.	Pos.	Nation	Player
1	GK	(North Macedonia) MKD	David Drango
4	DF	(North Macedonia) MKD	Enes Shabani
5	DF	(North Macedonia) MKD	Viktor Jordanoski
6	DF	(North Macedonia) MKD	Sumer Hasan
7	FW	(North Macedonia) MKD	Erkan Shaip
8	DF	(North Macedonia) MKD	Filip Gjorgjievski
9	FW	(North Macedonia) MKD	Florent Osmani
10	MF	(North Macedonia) MKD	Erblin Daci
11	DF	(North Macedonia) MKD	Bujar Iljazi

No.	Pos.	Nation	Player
16	FW	(North Macedonia) MKD	Rilind Ajdini
17	MF	(North Macedonia) MKD	Merdian Ramadani
21		(North Macedonia) MKD	Harbin Rechica
23	FW	(North Macedonia) MKD	Matej Gjurchinovski
70	FW	(North Macedonia) MKD	Sunaj Hasan
77	MF	(North Macedonia) MKD	Hixhret Rushiti
78	MF	(North Macedonia) MKD	Xhezair Avduli
—	FW	(North Macedonia) MKD	Jahi Bushi
—	FW	(North Macedonia) MKD	Mario Ristovski
