= FK Metalurg Skopje =

Metalurg Skopje
- Full name: Fudbalski klub Metalurg Skopje
- Nickname: Металурци (Metallurgists)
- Founded: 1964; 62 years ago
- Dissolved: 2017; 9 years ago
- Ground: Železarnica Stadium
- Capacity: 3,000
- Final season 2016–17: Macedonian Second League, 9th (relegated)
- Website: https://web.archive.org/web/20110717083732/http://www.fcmetalurg.com.mk/
Home colours	Away colours

FK Metalurg (Macedonian: ФК Металург) was a football club from Skopje, North Macedonia. In 2018 all the players moved to Železarnica Stadium neighbor FK Skopje as they merged with .

== History ==
The club was founded in 1964.

Metalurg entered the Macedonian First League in the 1992–93 season and were relegated the same year. After playing 15 seasons in the Macedonian Second League they were back in the Macedonian First League for the 2008–09 season. In the 2009–10 season they finished in 3rd place and played in Europe for the first time in club history. In 2015–16 season Metalurg was relegated from the First League after 8 seasons.

== Season-by-season record ==
A season-by-season record of Metalurg league performances:

Season	League									Cup	European competitions	
Season	Division	P	W	D	L	F	A	Pts	Pos	Cup	European competitions	
1992–93	1. MFL	34	12	7	15	37	42	31	15th ↓	SF		
1993–94	2. MFL West	26	11	8	7	28	21	30	2nd			
1994–95	2. MFL West	32	8	11	13	43	58	35	15th ↓			
1995–96	3. MFL North-Polog	?	?	?	?	?	?	?	?			
1996–97	3. MFL North-Polog	?	?	?	?	?	?	?	?			
1997–98	3. MFL North-Polog	?	?	?	?	?	?	?	?			
1998–99	3. MFL North-Polog	?	?	?	?	?	?	?	?			
1999–00	3. MFL North-Polog	?	?	?	?	?	?	?	?	PR		
2000–01	3. MFL North	?	?	?	?	?	?	?	?	PR		
2001–02	3. MFL North	?	?	?	?	?	?	?	?	R1		
2002–03	3. MFL North	?	?	?	?	?	?	?	?	PR		
2003–04	3. MFL North	?	?	?	?	?	?	?	3rd	PR		
2004–05	3. MFL North	?	?	?	?	?	?	?	1st ↑	PR		
2005–06	2. MFL	30	10	7	13	29	36	37	8th	PR		
2006–07	2. MFL	33	10	13	10	38	37	43	7th	R2		
2007–08	2. MFL	32	20	7	5	47	24	67	2nd ↑	R1		
2008–09	1. MFL	30	6	11	13	25	35	29	9th	R2		
2009–10	1. MFL	26	12	11	3	35	16	47	3rd	QF		
2010–11	1. MFL	33	17	10	6	48	24	61	2nd	W	Europa League	QR1
2011–12	1. MFL	33	19	10	4	53	16	67	2nd	R2	Europa League	QR1
2012–13	1. MFL	33	18	9	6	48	28	63	2nd	QF	Europa League	QR2
2013–14	1. MFL	33	16	11	6	48	29	59	3rd	RU	Europa League	QR1
2014–15	1. MFL	32	8	9	15	34	42	33	6th	R1	Europa League	QR3
2015–16	1. MFL	33	5	4	22	27	65	19	9th ↓	R2		
2016–17	2. MFL	27	7	5	15	29	48	26	9th ↓↓	QF		

== Metalurg in Europe ==
- Q = qualifier

Season	Competition	Round	Club	Home	Away	Agg.
2010–11	UEFA Europa League	Q1	(Azerbaijan) Qarabağ	1–1	1–4	2–5
2011–12	UEFA Europa League	Q2	(Bulgaria) PFC Lokomotiv Sofia	0–0	2–3	2–3
2012–13	UEFA Europa League	Q1	(Malta) Birkirkara FC	0–0	2–2	2–2 (a)
2012–13	UEFA Europa League	Q2	(Poland) Ruch Chorzów	0–3	1–3	1–6
2013–14	UEFA Europa League	Q1	(Azerbaijan) Qarabağ	0–1	0–1	0–2
2014–15	UEFA Europa League	Q1	(Andorra) UE Santa Coloma	2–0	3–0	5–0
2014–15	UEFA Europa League	Q2	(Bosnia and Herzegovina) FK Željezničar	0–0	2–2	2–2 (a)
2014–15	UEFA Europa League	Q3	(Cyprus) AC Omonia	0–1	0–3	0–4

== Historical list of coaches ==
- (North Macedonia) Nikola Ilievski (1991 - 1992)
- (North Macedonia) Slavche Vojneski (1998 - 1999)
- (North Macedonia) Baze Lazarevski (2007 - Oct 2008)
- (North Macedonia) Gjore Jovanovski (26 Oct 2008 - Nov 2009)
- (North Macedonia) Nikola Ilievski (22 Nov 2009 - 12 Dec 2009)
- (North Macedonia) Zikica Tasevski (13 Dec 2009 - 3 Oct 2011)
- (North Macedonia) Georgi Hristov (3 Oct 2011 - 30 Jun 2012)
- (North Macedonia) Aleksandar Vlaho (1 Jul 2012 - 31 Jul 2012)
- (North Macedonia) Georgi Hristov (1 Aug 2011 - 21 Nov 2012)
- (North Macedonia) Srgjan Zaharievski (22 Nov 2012 - 30 Jun 2015)
- (North Macedonia) Marjan Gerasimovski (1 Jul 2015 - 31 Aug 2015)
- (North Macedonia) Alekso Mackov (2 Sep 2015 - Jun 2016)

== Honours ==
- (Socialist Republic of Macedonia) Macedonian Republic League:
  - Winners (1): 1987
- (North Macedonia) Macedonian First League:
  - Runners-up (3): 2010–11, 2011–12, 2012–13
- (North Macedonia) Macedonian Second League:
  - Runners-up (2): 1993–94, 2007–08
- (North Macedonia) Macedonian Football Cup:
  - Winners (1): 2010–11
  - Runners-up (1): 2013–14
- (North Macedonia) Macedonian Football Supercup:
  - Runners-up (1): 2011

== See also ==
- KK MZT Skopje
- RK Metalurg Skopje
