= FK Miravci =

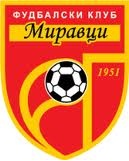
- Full name: Fudbalski klub Miravci
- Founded: 1951
- Ground: Stadion Miravci
- Capacity: 1,000
- League: none
- 2015–16: Macedonian Second League, 10th (relegated)
Home colours	Away colours

FK Miravci (Macedonian: ФК Миравци) is a football club based in the village of Miravci near Gevgelija, Republic of North Macedonia. They recently played in the Macedonian Second League.

== History ==
Logo as Kožuf Miravci

The club was founded in 1951.

In the 2010–11 season, they finished 4th in the Macedonian Second League and won promotion to the Macedonian First League by beating FK Skopje 4–1 in a promotion playoff game. Later, the club gave up that spot after a fusion with FK Vardar and went back to playing in the Macedonian Second League for the 2011–12 season.
