= FK Skopje =

Skopje
- Full name: Fudbalski Klub Skopje
- Nickname: Пирати (The Pirates)
- Founded: 1921 fusion 1960; 66 years ago
- Ground: FFM Training Centre
- Capacity: 2,500
- Owner: Gazi Baba Municipality
- Chairman: Deni Muftarovski
- Manager: Muarem Muarem
- League: Macedonian First League
- 2025–26: Macedonian Second League, 2nd (promoted)
| Home colours | Away colours |

FK Skopje (Macedonian: ФК Скопје) is a football club from Skopje, the capital of the North Macedonia. They are currently competing in the Macedonian First League.

== History ==
Fudball Club SSK, an acronym for Skopski Sportski Klub (Sports Club Skopje), was a football club based in Skopje, present-day North Macedonia. The club was founded in 1921 under the name Skopski Sportski Klub and operated under the abbreviation SSK until 1941. It was later renamed Metalec Skopje.

Upon its founding, SSK was incorporated into the Skopje parish, one of the administrative districts of the Skoplje Football Subassociation, a regional subdivision of the Yugoslav Football Association. In December 1927, the club became affiliated with the newly established subassociation structure that organized competitive football in the region.

- Sub Association Cup 1930

Semi Final
SC Josif vs Jug Skopje 2-3
SC Bitola vs SSK 1-5
Final
SSK vs Jug Skopje 2-1 (aot)

=== Glory days and dissolution (1930-1941) ===
In 1930, when they won their first title, although the autumn part of the season was canceled. In 1931, they managed to compete in the qualifiers for the Yugoslav championship. SSK lost in the play off against Soko Belgrade (2–3 and 1–4). In the following 3 seasons, they won the championship each time, but never managed to qualify for the Yugoslav championship. In 1932, they finished fifth, ahead of Gragjanski. In 1933, they tried again, but they lost in the 2nd qualifying round against Jedinstvo Parachin (0–4 and 2–0), while in 1934, they finished fifth in the 2nd qualifying group. They became champions twice more in 1939 and 1940, but still failed to reach the Yugoslav championship. In 1939, they were defeated in the play-off final by FK Vojvodina (2–2 and 1–4), and were eliminated in the repechage by Balshich (0–1 and 1–2). In 1940, after eliminating Zheleznichar Nish and Jedinstvo Chachak, they lost the final against Jugoslavija Jabuka (2–4 and 2–4), and later in the play-off by BASK Belgrade (3–2 and 0–3). In 1941, SSK made fusion with Gragjanski and formed FK Makedonija.

=== Re-establisment and winning years (1946-1991) ===
In 1946, SSK was re-established as FK Dinamo Skopje, and entered the Macedonian Republic League championships. In 1948, they won the championship and played qualification for second federal division. Later on, the Metal Industry Cooperation became main sponsor of the team and the name of the club was changed to Metalec Skopje. They won the championship in 1955 and got promoted to the second federal division at the time divided into 5 zones, where it remained for two seasons. In 1960 it merged with FK Industrijalec(known as former JUG Skopje) to form MIK Skopje, acronym for "Metalska Industrija Kale". They won the Macedonian Republic League, for the last time in 1970. As FK MIK, the club competed for two seasons in the Yugoslav Second League East where they played with teams from federal Republics of Macedonia, Montenegro and Serbia. FK MIK (Metalska Industrija Kale) later changed their name to FK Skopje during the 1973–74 season.

=== Macedonian First league ===
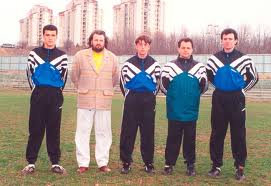

Since season 1992-93 of the Macedonian First League FK Skope mainly competed in the Second division. They had two dominant seasons in the Macedonian Second League winning two times in the season 1996–97, and in 2020–21 when they have qualified for the First division. They have managed to qualify and play in the First Division for 6 seasons: 1997-98, 1998–99, 2010–11, 2017–18, 2021–22 and 2022–23. In the year 2018, FK Metalurg Skopje merged within FK Skopje and all the players moved to Železarnica Stadium. After that, FK Skopje did not fair well in the top division.

== Colours ==
The club's colours have traditionally been blue and white. In the early years Skopje played in blue and white striped shirts just like today, but for much of its history they played in blue shirts with white collar or white V-neck. In the mid-90s Skopje played a many seasons in red and white hooped shirts as well.

| Skopjes kit | Casual kit | Mid-90s |

== Current squad ==
As of 19 September 2026

Note: Flags indicate national team as defined under FIFA eligibility rules; some limited exceptions apply. Players may hold more than one non-FIFA nationality.

| No. | Pos. | Nation | Player |
|---|---|---|---|
| 1 | GK | MKD | Kristijan Naumovski (captain) |
| 4 | DF | MKD | Jorgo Papuli |
| 5 | MF | MKD | Toma Georgievski |
| 6 | DF | MKD | Jasmin Mecinovikj |
| 7 | FW | MKD | Antonio Bozhinoski |
| 8 | MF | MKD | Gorjan Cvetkov |
| 9 | FW | MKD | Viktor Angelov |
| 10 | FW | MKD | Vasko Papaliski |
| 11 | FW | MKD | Andrej Cvetkovski (on loan from Vardar) |
| 12 | GK | MKD | Amin Suljovikj |
| 14 | DF | MKD | Mihail Nikolov |
| 15 | DF | MKD | Davor Serafimov |
| 16 | MF | MKD | Darko Sekovski (on loan from Vardar) |
| 17 | MF | MKD | Slavko Ristoski |
| 19 | DF | MKD | Vladica Brdarovski |

| No. | Pos. | Nation | Player |
|---|---|---|---|
| 20 | MF | MKD | Kristijan Nikolovski |
| 21 | MF | MKD | Tomche Grozdanovski |
| 22 | DF | MKD | Andrej Murdjeski (on loan from Vardar) |
| 24 | DF | MKD | Dushko Trajchevski |
| 29 | DF | MKD | Fisnik Saliu |
| 30 | MF | MKD | Harbin Tusha |
| 31 | MF | MKD | Ali Adem |
| 34 | DF | MKD | Stefan Mladenovski |
| 47 | FW | MKD | Andrej Stojanovski |
| 70 | DF | MKD | Dimitrij Poposki |
| 77 | FW | MKD | Omar Berovikj |
| 99 | MF | SRB | Nemanja Vlajković |
| — | DF | MKD | Aleksandar Gjurkovski |
| — | FW | MKD | Aleksej Slavkov |

=== Current technical staff ===
As of 1 August 2026

| Position | Name |
|---|---|
| Head coach | (North Macedonia) Muarem Muarem |
| Assistant coach | (North Macedonia) Blazhe Lazarevski |
| Assistant coach | (North Macedonia) Enes Qaili |
| Doctor | (North Macedonia) Blerim Idrizi |
| Security person | (North Macedonia) Aleksandar Krstevski |
| Administrator | (North Macedonia) Deniz Muftarovski |
| Club representative | (North Macedonia) Igor Todorovski |

== Honours ==
- Domestic League
  - Winners:1925, 1930,1931, 1932,1933, 1934,1939, 1940,1948, 1955, 1970, 1987
- Macedonian Second League:
  - Winners:1997, 2021
- Macedonian Football Cup:
  - Winners: 2011

== Recent seasons ==
| Season | League | | | | | | | | | Cup |
| Season | Division | P | W | D | L | F | A | Pts | Pos | Cup |
|---|---|---|---|---|---|---|---|---|---|---|
| 1992–93 | 2. MFL | 38 | 21 | 9 | 8 | 73 | 32 | 51 | 3rd | |
| 1993–94 | 2. MFL West | 26 | 11 | 4 | 11 | 54 | 42 | 26 | 5th | |
| 1994–95 | 2. MFL West | 32 | 13 | 1 | 18 | 48 | 63 | 40 | 12th | |
| 1995–96 | 2. MFL West | 30 | 13 | 5 | 12 | 58 | 49 | 44 | 7th | |
| 1996–97 | 2. MFL West | 29 | 21 | 4 | 4 | 68 | 23 | 67 | 1st ↑ | R2 |
| 1997–98 | 1. MFL | 25 | 9 | 3 | 13 | 31 | 45 | 30 | 10th | SF |
| 1998–99 | 1. MFL | 26 | 5 | 2 | 19 | 25 | 59 | 17 | 13th ↓ | |
| 1999–00 | 2. MFL West | 30 | 14 | 2 | 18 | 63 | 59 | 44 | 12th ↓ | R1 |
| 2000–01 | 3. MFL North | ? | ? | ? | ? | ? | ? | ? | ? | PR |
| 2001–02 | 3. MFL North | ? | ? | ? | ? | ? | ? | ? | ? | R1 |
| 2002–03 | 3. MFL North | ? | ? | ? | ? | ? | ? | ? | 1st ↑ | PR |
| 2003–04 | 2. MFL | 32 | 17 | 2 | 13 | 46 | 45 | 53 | 3rd | PR |
| 2004–05 | 2. MFL | 33 | 11 | 8 | 14 | 46 | 49 | 41 | 7th | R1 |
| 2005–06 | 2. MFL | 33 | 11 | 7 | 12 | 30 | 36 | 40 | 6th | R1 |
| 2006–07 | 2. MFL | 33 | 13 | 10 | 10 | 32 | 21 | 49 | 4th | PR |
| 2007–08 | 2. MFL | 32 | 16 | 6 | 10 | 53 | 44 | 54 | 5th | QF |
| 2008–09 | 2. MFL | 29 | 12 | 4 | 13 | 38 | 38 | 40 | 8th | PR |
| 2009–10 | 2. MFL | 26 | 17 | 6 | 3 | 49 | 22 | 57 | 2nd ↑ | SF |
| 2010–11 | 1. MFL | 33 | 9 | 10 | 14 | 36 | 39 | 37 | 9th ↓ | R1 |
| 2011–12 | 2. MFL | 30 | 17 | 5 | 8 | 50 | 26 | 56 | 3rd | R2 |
| 2012–13 | 2. MFL | 33 | 19 | 6 | 5 | 59 | 18 | 63 | 3rd | PR |
| 2013–14 | 2. MFL | 33 | 16 | 5 | 8 | 48 | 32 | 53 | 3rd | PR |
| 2014–15 | 2. MFL | 27 | 10 | 9 | 8 | 27 | 19 | 39 | 5th | PR |
| 2015–16 | 2. MFL | 27 | 9 | 9 | 9 | 27 | 23 | 36 | 6th | R2 |
| 2016–17 | 2. MFL | 27 | 16 | 6 | 5 | 43 | 26 | 54 | 2nd ↑ | R1 |
| 2017–18 | 1. MFL | 36 | 7 | 14 | 15 | 24 | 43 | 35 | 9th ↓ | QF |
| 2018–19 | 2. MFL West | 27 | 10 | 7 | 10 | 32 | 24 | 37 | 6th | R2 |
| 2019–20^{1} | 2. MFL West | 16 | 9 | 2 | 5 | 21 | 14 | 29 | 2nd | PR |
| 2020–21 | 2. MFL West | 27 | 18 | 6 | 12 | 50 | 20 | 60 | 1st ↑ | R1 |
| 2021–22 | 1. MFL | 33 | 9 | 8 | 16 | 27 | 45 | 35 | 9th | R2 |
| 2022–23 | 1. MFL | 30 | 4 | 10 | 16 | 17 | 44 | 22 | 10th ↓ | R2 |
| 2023–24 | 2. MFL | 30 | 11 | 8 | 11 | 29 | 30 | 41 | 9th | R1 |
| 2024–25 | 2. MFL | 30 | 9 | 12 | 9 | 32 | 32 | 39 | 10th | R1 |
| 2025–26 | 2. MFL | 30 | 23 | 2 | 5 | 72 | 20 | 71 | 2nd ↑ | R1 |

^{1}The 2019–20 season was abandoned due to the COVID-19 pandemic in North Macedonia.

== Supporters ==
FK Skopje supporters are known as Pirati (Pirates), mostly coming from the Skopje settlement Avtokomanda. They are now active, despite not being active in recent years. 1992- present

European record

- Q = qualifier

| Season | Competition | Round | Club | Home | Away | Agg. |
|---|---|---|---|---|---|---|
| 2010–11 | UEFA Europa League | Q1 | (Azerbaijan) Qarabağ | 1–1 | 1–4 | 2–5 |
| 2011–12 | UEFA Europa League | Q2 | (Bulgaria) PFC Lokomotiv Sofia | 0–0 | 2–3 | 2–3 |
| 2012–13 | UEFA Europa League | Q1 | (Malta) Birkirkara FC | 0–0 | 2–2 | 2–2 (a) |
| 2012–13 | UEFA Europa League | Q2 | (Poland) Ruch Chorzów | 0–3 | 1–3 | 1–6 |
| 2013–14 | UEFA Europa League | Q1 | (Azerbaijan) Qarabağ | 0–1 | 0–1 | 0–2 |
| 2014–15 | UEFA Europa League | Q1 | (Andorra) UE Santa Coloma | 2–0 | 3–0 | 5–0 |
| 2014–15 | UEFA Europa League | Q2 | (Bosnia and Herzegovina) FK Željezničar | 0–0 | 2–2 | 2–2 (a) |
| 2014–15 | UEFA Europa League | Q3 | (Cyprus) AC Omonia | 0–1 | 0–3 | 0–4 |
