= FK Ohrid =

ГФК Охрид Лихнидос GFK Ohrid Lychnidos
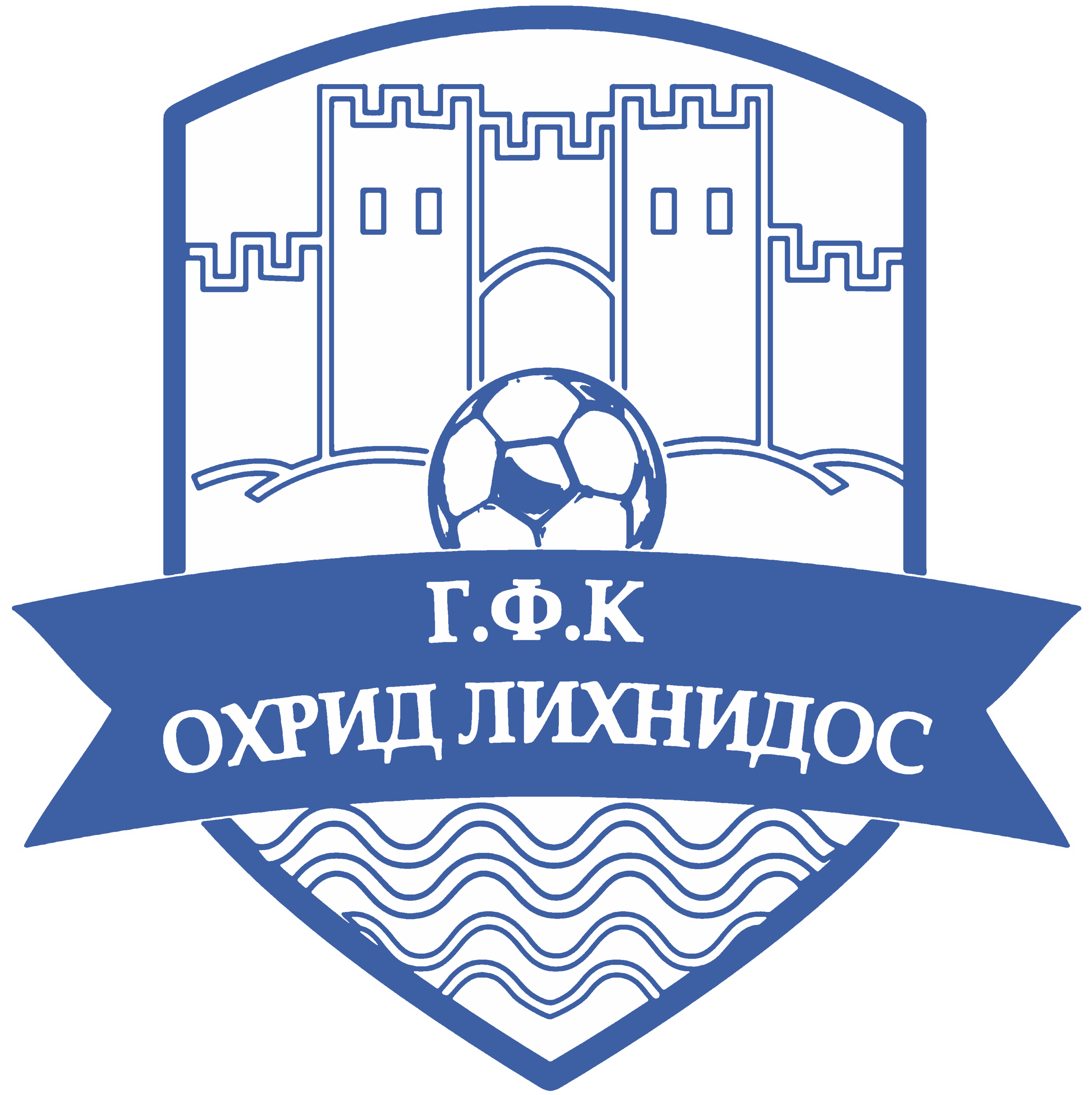
- Full name: Gradski fudbalski klub Ohrid Lychnidos / Градски фудбалски клуб Охрид Лихнидос
- Nickname: Рибари (The Fishermen)
- Founded: 1921; 105 years ago
- Ground: SRC Biljanini Izvori
- Capacity: 3,980
- Chairman: Goce Toleski
- Manager: Romeo Kochoski
- League: Macedonian Second League
- 2025/26: 4th
Home colours	Away colours

GFK Ohrid Lychnidos (Macedonian: ГФК Охрид Лихнидос) is a football club from the city of Ohrid in North Macedonia. They play in blue and white jerseys at the SRC Biljanini Izvori football complex and its currently competing in the Macedonian Second League.

== History ==
The club was created in 1921 under the name OSK Ohrid. It started competing under the name FK Ohrid in 1946 by uniting all the Ohrid football clubs (OSK, FK Ohridski Branovi, FK Jugoslavija, FK Rashanec and FK Gragjanski). They played in the old Macedonian Republic League in 1948 where they finished in 8th place. Perhaps, the most influential person for the rise in popularity of football in Ohrid was Boško Simonović, who was the team's coach.

== Stadium ==
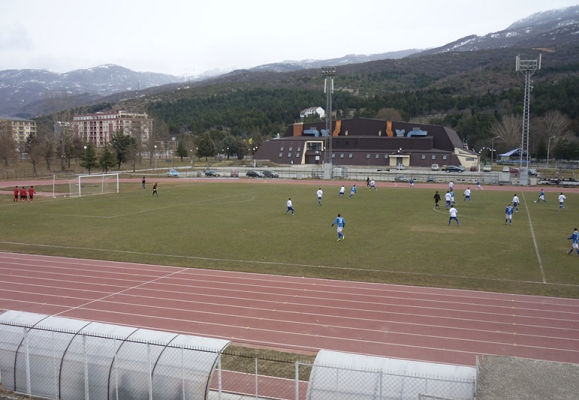
The stadium SRC Biljanini Izvori was constructed in 1978 and has a seating capacity of 3,978. In 2021, a new eastern stand seating 1,478 people was opened. It is located at SRC Biljana's springs near the Ohrid Lake. It is a venue for football matches and National Athletic Championships.

== Supporters ==
Ohrid Lihnidos supporters are called Ribari, which means Fishermen.

== Honours ==
- (North Macedonia) Macedonian Second League
  - Winners (1): 1993–94
  - Runners-up (1): 2010–11
- (North Macedonia) Macedonian Third Football League
  - Winners (2): 2006–07, 2018–19
  - Runners-up (1): 2004–05
- (Socialist Republic of Macedonia) Macedonian Republic Cup
  - Winners (1): 1973

== Recent seasons ==
Season	League									Cup
Season	Division	P	W	D	L	F	A	Pts	Pos	Cup
1992–93	2. MFL	38	18	9	11	55	39	44	4th	
1993–94	2. MFL West	26	15	5	6	61	19	35	1st ↑	SF
1994–95	1. MFL	30	11	5	14	45	43	38	8th	
1995–96	1. MFL	28	8	7	13	29	39	31	13th ↓	
1996–97	2. MFL West	29	12	4	13	37	50	40	10th	R2
1997–98	2. MFL West	30	10	6	14	47	46	36	12th	R1
1998–99	2. MFL West	30	15	5	10	58	32	50	3rd	
1999–00	2. MFL West	34	21	3	10	91	43	66	4th	R2
2000–01	2. MFL	34	16	5	13	55	51	53	8th	R1
2001–02	2. MFL	34	16	2	16	66	78	50	7th	R1
2002–03	2. MFL	36	8	1	27	45	100	25	18th ↓	PR
2003–04	3. MFL Southwest	?	?	?	?	?	?	?	?	PR
2004–05	3. MFL Southwest	26	15	2	9	64	39	47	2nd	PR
2005–06	3. MFL Southwest	?	?	?	?	?	?	?	?	R1
2006–07	3. MFL Southwest	?	?	?	?	?	?	?	1st ↑	PR
2007–08	2. MFL	32	12	5	15	43	53	41	9th	PR
2008–09	2. MFL	29	8	6	15	31	50	30	11th	R2
2009–10	2. MFL	26	5	1	20	26	52	82^{(−3)}	14th	R2
2010–11	2. MFL	26	16	5	5	51	21	53	2nd ↑	R2
2011–12	1. MFL	33	6	8	19	26	62	26	11th ↓	PR
2012–13	2. MFL	30	4	1	25	25	100	7^{(−6)}	16th ↓	R1
2013–14	did not participate									
2014–15	did not participate									
2015–16	OFL Ohrid	18	?	?	?	?	?	47	1st ↑	PR
2016–17	3. MFL Southwest	26	11	4	11	62	56	37	5th	PR
2017–18	3. MFL Southwest	24	9	2	13	59	70	29	10th	PR
2018–19	3. MFL Southwest	25	18	4	3	78	23	58	1st ↑	PR
2019–20^{1}	2. MFL West	16	4	2	10	15	29	14	9th	N/A
2020–21	2. MFL West	27	13	7	6	26	13	46	2nd	R1
2021–22	2. MFL West	27	9	5	13	34	32	32	7th	R2
2022–23	2. MFL	30	12	5	13	31	35	41	7th	PR
2023–24	2. MFL	30	13	6	11	35	32	45	5th	R2
2024–25	2. MFL	30	12	6	12	36	40	42	7th	R1
2025–26	2. MFL	30	21	5	4	78	17	68	4th	SF

^{1}The 2019–20 season was abandoned due to the COVID-19 pandemic in North Macedonia.

== Current squad ==
As of 23 August 2025.

Note: Flags indicate national team as defined under FIFA eligibility rules; some limited exceptions apply. Players may hold more than one non-FIFA nationality.

No.	Pos.	Nation	Player
1	GK	MKD	Damjan Serafimov
2	DF	MKD	Martin Gjorgjievski
3	DF	MKD	Kiril Gashoski
4	DF	MKD	Ensal Rashid
5	DF	MKD	Filip Gjorgoski
6	DF	MKD	Albnor Kaba
7	FW	MKD	Antonio Kalanoski
8	MF	MKD	Angel Krsteski
9	FW	MKD	Oliver Dishlieski
10	MF	MKD	Eren Partalko
11	FW	MKD	Ivan Gligorov
12	GK	MKD	Nenad Pentalashoski

No.	Pos.	Nation	Player
13	MF	MKD	Andrej Ristovski
14	DF	MKD	Dimitrij Dimitrievski
16	MF	MKD	Viktor Naumvoski
17	MF	MKD	Hristijan Spiroski
18	MF	MKD	David Karamachoski
19	FW	MKD	Stojan Poposki
20	DF	MKD	Leonid Kofiloski
21	MF	MKD	Hristijan Stojanoski
22	MF	MKD	Dimitrij Poposki
23	MF	MKD	Naumche Bakracheski
26	MF	MKD	Bojan Zaturoski
32	GK	MKD	Diel Doko

=== Notable former players ===
This is a list of FK Ohrid players with senior national team appearances:

1. (North Macedonia) Isnik Alimi
2. (North Macedonia) Dančo Celeski
3. (North Macedonia) Goce Toleski
4. (North Macedonia) Jurica Siljanoski
