= Gradski stadion Kičevo =

Sports venue in Kičevo, North Macedonia

Coordinates: 41.507222°N 20.963333°E

Градски стадион Кичево City Stadium Kičevo< br />Stadiumi i qytetit (Kërçovë)
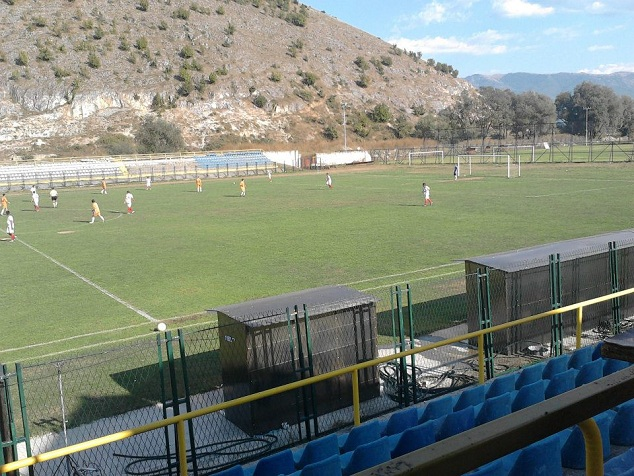
- Interactive map of Градски стадион Кичево; City Stadium Kičevo< br />Stadiumi i qytetit (Kërçovë)
- Location: Kičevo, North Macedonia
- Owner: Kičevo Municipality
- Capacity: 5,000
- Surface: Grass

Tenants
- FK Napredok; KF Vëllazërimi 77; KF Zajazi

City Stadium Kičevo is a multi-purpose stadium in Kičevo, North Macedonia. It is used mostly for football matches and is the home stadium of FK Napredok. The stadium holds 5,000 people.
