= Macedonian Second Football League =

Macedonian association football league

Macedonian Second League Македонска втора лига
- Founded: 1992
- Country: North Macedonia
- Confederation: UEFA
- Divisions: 1
- Number of clubs: 16
- Level on pyramid: 2
- Promotion to: 1. MFL
- Relegation to: 3. MFL
- Domestic cup: Macedonian Football Cup
- Current champions: Bregalnica (4th titles) (2025–26)
- Most championships: Bregalnica; Makedonija G.P. (4 titles)
- Broadcaster(s): M Net HD (regional only)
- Website: ffm.mk
- Current: 2026–27 Macedonian Second Football League

The Macedonian Second Football League (Macedonian: Втора македонска фудбалска лига; also called Macedonian Second League, 2. MFL and Vtora Liga) is the second-highest professional football competition in North Macedonia.

The competition is contested by 14 clubs, playing each other 2 times over 26 rounds. At the end of the season, the winner of the league along with the 2nd placed team will gain promotion to the Macedonian First League, while the 3rd placed team will go into a play-off against the 8th placed team in the Macedonian First League.

== 2026–27 member clubs ==
Location of teams in 2026–27 Macedonian Second League

- Belasica
- Brera
- Detonit Plachkovica
- Kamjani
- Kozhuf
- Euromilk
- Makedonija
- Novaci
- Ohrid
- Osogovo
- Pelister
- Shkupi
- Skopje
- Teteks

== Winning clubs ==
Macedonian Second League's former logo

Note: Bold indicates clubs that was promoted to the Macedonian First League.

Season	Division	Champions	Runners-up	Third place
1992–93	United	**Ljuboten**	**Karaorman**	Skopje
1993–94	East	**Kozhuf**	Bregalnica Shtip	Prvi Partizan
1993–94	West	**Ohrid**	Metalurg Skopje	Teteks
1994–95	East	Pobeda Valandovo	Kumanovo	Bregalnica Shtip
1994–95	West	**Makedonija Skopje**	Shkëndija Arachinovo	Gostivar (1919)
1995–96	East	**Bregalnica Shtip**	Borec	Plachkovica Jaka
1995–96	West	**Shkëndija**	Napredok	Shkëndija Arachinovo
1996–97	East	**Borec**	Osogovo	Bregalnica Delchevo
1996–97	West	**Skopje**	Karaorman	Teteks
1997–98	East	**Osogovo**	Kumanovo	Jaka Radovish
1997–98	West	**Rabotnichki**	Jugohrom	Teteks
1998–99	East	**Kumanovo**	Belasica	Bashkimi
1998–99	West	**Napredok**	Teteks	Ohrid
1999–00	East	**Belasica**	Sloga Vinica	Bashkimi
1999–00	West	**Shkëndija**	Karaorman	Teteks
2000–01	United	**Kumanovo**	**Napredok**	Jugohrom
2001–02	United	**Tikvesh**	**Bregalnica Delchevo**	Bashkimi
2002–03	United	**Bashkimi**	**Madjari Solidarnost**	Teteks
2003–04	United	**Bregalnica Shtip**	**Shkëndija 79**	Skopje
2004–05	United	**Vëllazërimi**	**Renova**	**Makedonija G.P.**
2005–06	United	**Pelister**	**Napredok**	Karaorman
2006–07	United	**Milano**	**Cementarnica 55**	Teteks
2007–08	United	**Turnovo**	**Metalurg**	Miravci
2008–09	United	**Teteks**	**Sloga Jugomagnat**	Shkëndija
2009–10	United	**Shkëndija**	**Skopje**	**Napredok**
2010–11	United	**11 Oktomvri**	**Ohrid**	Tikvesh
2011–12	United	**Pelister**	**Drita**	Gorno Lisiche
2012–13	United	**Makedonija G.P.**	**Gostivar**	Skopje
2013–14	United	**Sileks**	**Teteks**	Skopje
2014–15	United	**Shkupi**	**Mladost Carev Dvor**	Gostivar
2015–16	United	**Pobeda (2010)**	**Makedonija G.P.**	**Pelister**
2016–17	United	**Akademija Pandev**	**Skopje**	Novaci
2017–18	East	**Belasica**	Borec	Bregalnica Shtip
2017–18	West	**Makedonija G.P.**	Gostivar	Vëllazërimi 77
2018–19	East	**Borec**	Tikvesh	Bregalnica Shtip
2018–19	West	**Struga**	Labunishta	Pelister
2019–20		None awarded, Belasica and Pelister were promoted		
2020–21	East	**Bregalnica Shtip**	**Tikvesh**	Kit-Go
2020–21	West	**Skopje**	Ohrid	Veleshta
2021–22	East	**Pobeda (2010)**	Belasica	Sloga 1934
2021–22	West	**Sileks**	Voska Sport	Vardar
2022–23	United	**Voska Sport**	**Gostivar**	**Vardar**
2023–24	United	**Besa Dobri Dol**	**Pelister**	Detonit Plachkovica
2024–25	United	**Makedonija G.P.**	**Arsimi**	**Bashkimi**
2025–26	United	**Bregalnica Shtip**	**Skopje**	**Shkëndija 77**
