= FK 11 Oktomvri =

- Full name: Fudbalski klub 11 Oktomvri Prilep
- Founded: 1951; 74 years ago
- Ground: Goce Delčev Stadium
- Capacity: 15,000
Home colours	Away colours

FK 11 Oktomvri (Macedonian: ФК 11 Октомври) is a football club from Prilep, North Macedonia. They recently played in the Macedonian Third League.

== History ==
The club was founded in 1951.

In the 2010–11 season, they won the Macedonian Second League title with manager Nikolce Zdravevski and were promoted to the Macedonian First League for the first time in club history. They lasted only one season in the top tier.

== Honours ==
- Macedonian Second League
  - Winners (1): 2010–11
