= FK Bregalnica Štip =

Bregalnica Shtip
- Full name: Fudbalski klub Bregalnica Shtip; Фудбалски клуб Брегалница Штип
- Nickname: Сини (The Blues)
- Founded: 1921; 105 years ago
- Ground: City Stadium Štip
- Capacity: 8,000
- Owner(s): Frank Salomon (51%); Štip Municipality (49%)
- Chairman: Angel Bojadziev
- Manager: Nikola Kuzmanov
- League: Macedonian First League
- 2025–26: Macedonian Second League, 1st (promoted)
- Website: fkbregalnica.mk
Home colours	Away colours

FK Bregalnica Shtip (Macedonian: ФK Брегалница Штип) is a professional football club based in Shtip, North Macedonia. They are currently competing in the Macedonian First Football League.

== History ==
FK Bregalnica was formed in 1921 and currently play in the Macedonian First League. They are named Bregalnica after the 2nd largest river in North Macedonia and their nickname is The Blues because of the club colours being predominantly dark blue. They play their games at Gradski Stadion Štip ground, a stadium capable of hosting 8,000 seated fans, plus an addition of space for standing fans of 2,000 fans. The club's most successful years were those between 1964 and 1984, when the club were champion of the Macedonian Republic League four times and won the Macedonian Cup in 1981 (these were regional Yugoslav competitions back then). The good times did not last however, the next few years saw the decline of FK Bregalnica, distinguished by the loss of their star players. With the arrival of the new sponsor Kit-Go Bregalnica plan to play European football in the next two seasons with predominantly homegrown players.

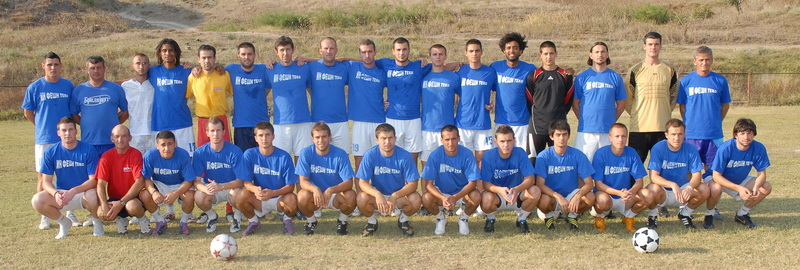
team Bregalnica

== Stadium ==
Bregalnica stadium is under renovation. Upon completion it will have a capacity of 10,000 seats.

== Supporters ==
The supporters of Bregalnica Štip are called "The Falanga", named after the infantry formation and army of Alexander the Great.

== Honours ==
- (Socialist Republic of Macedonia) Macedonian Republic League
  - Winners (4): 1963–64, 1966–67, 1975–76, 1983–84
- (Socialist Republic of Macedonia) Macedonian Republic Cup
  - Winners (1): 1981
- (North Macedonia) Macedonian Second League
  - Winners (4): 1995–96, 2003–04, 2020–21, 2025–26

== Recent seasons ==
Season	League									Cup
Season	Division	P	W	D	L	F	A	Pts	Pos	Cup
1992–93	1. MFL	34	11	8	15	38	45	30	16th ↓	
1993–94	2. MFL East	26	16	4	6	50	17	33^{(−3)}	2nd	
1994–95	2. MFL East	30	15	4	11	45	32	49	3rd	
1995–96	2. MFL East	30	24	6	0	89	19	78	1st ↑	QF
1996–97	1. MFL	26	10	5	11	30	33	35	6th	R2
1997–98^{1}	1. MFL	13	4	0	9	13	32	12	14th ↓	
1998–99	2. MFL East	29	14	5	10	38	31	38^{(−9)}	8th	
1999–00	2. MFL East	30	13	6	11	63	34	45	9th ↓	R2
2000–01	3. MFL East	?	?	?	?	?	?	?	?	R2
2001–02	3. MFL East	?	?	?	?	?	?	?	1st ↑	PR
2002–03	2. MFL	36	19	5	12	66	43	62	6th	PR
2003–04	2. MFL	32	23	4	5	73	38	73	1st ↑	R1
2004–05	1. MFL	33	14	6	13	55	60	48	7th	QF
2005–06	1. MFL	33	10	6	17	44	55	36	10th	SF
2006–07	1. MFL	33	3	4	26	19	97	13	11th ↓	R2
2007–08	2. MFL	32	9	10	13	36	43	37	15th	R2
2008–09	2. MFL	29	14	9	6	45	21	51	4th	R1
2009–10	2. MFL	26	15	7	4	49	19	52	4th ↑	R1
2010–11	1. MFL	33	12	5	16	33	49	41	8th	QF
2011–12	1. MFL	33	13	6	14	51	46	45	5th	QF
2012–13	1. MFL	33	12	7	14	37	35	43	6th	R2
2013–14	1. MFL	33	11	11	11	34	34	44	7th	SF
2014–15	1. MFL	32	13	9	11	33	29	48	7th	R2
2015–16	1. MFL	32	10	8	14	42	49	38	6th	SF
2016–17	1. MFL	36	4	12	20	39	69	24	9th ↓	SF
2017–18	2. MFL East	25	15	8	2	54	20	53	3rd	R2
2018–19	2. MFL East	27	15	7	5	54	26	52	3rd	R2
2019–20^{2}	2. MFL East	16	11	4	1	39	9	37	2nd	N/A
2020–21	2. MFL East	27	23	4	0	73	18	73	1st ↑	R2
2021–22	1. MFL	33	12	9	12	45	47	45	7th	QF
2022–23	1. MFL	30	10	11	9	33	34	41	5th	QF
2023–24	1. MFL	33	6	10	17	27	50	28	12th ↓	QF
2024–25	2. MFL	30	17	7	6	38	23	58	4th	R2
2025–26	2. MFL	30	22	5	3	72	17	71	1st ↑	R2

^{1}Bregalnica was withdrawn from the league after 18th round. Their matches from 14th round onwards were annulled.

^{2}The 2019–20 season was abandoned due to the COVID-19 pandemic in North Macedonia.

== Current squad ==
As of 15 September 2026

Note: Flags indicate national team as defined under FIFA eligibility rules; some limited exceptions apply. Players may hold more than one non-FIFA nationality.

No.	Pos.	Nation	Player
1	GK	MKD	Amir Jashar
2	DF	MKD	Filip Chichev
3	DF	MKD	Andjelo Nikolovski
5	MF	MKD	Matej Angelov
6	DF	MKD	Riste Temelkov
7	FW	MKD	Martin Stojanov
8	DF	MKD	Metodi Maksimov
9	FW	MKD	Dino Miholov
10	MF	MKD	Ivan Nikolov
11	FW	MKD	Ivan Gligorov
12	GK	MKD	Nikola Filevski
13	FW	BRA	Matheus Lemos
14	DF	MKD	Viktor Velkoski

No.	Pos.	Nation	Player
15	DF	MKD	Blagoj Hadji-Kimov
16	MF	MKD	Matej Timovski
18	DF	MKD	Bojan Rajkov
19	DF	MKD	Darko Stojanov
20	MF	MKD	Darijan Tasev
21	MF	MKD	Luka Gjeorgjiev
22	DF	MKD	Stefan Kocev (captain)
23	FW	MKD	Filip Aleksovski
24	MF	MKD	Kristijan Stojkoski
26	DF	MKD	Andrej Velkov
35	FW	CAN	Nathaniel Mascoe Lawrenzo
98	GK	MKD	Martin Milenkovski
—	MF	MKD	David Kalpachki

=== Youth players ===
Players from the U19 Youth Team that have been summoned with the first team in the current season.

Note: Flags indicate national team as defined under FIFA eligibility rules; some limited exceptions apply. Players may hold more than one non-FIFA nationality.

No.	Pos.	Nation	Player
11	MF	MKD	Stefan Nikolov
12	GK	MKD	Kevin Zaov

=== Out on loan ===
Note: Flags indicate national team as defined under FIFA eligibility rules; some limited exceptions apply. Players may hold more than one non-FIFA nationality.

No.	Pos.	Nation	Player
—	MF	MKD	Luka Bojadjiev (at Detonit Plachkovica until 30 June 2027)

=== Current technical staff ===
As of 1 August 2026

Position	Name
Head coach	(North Macedonia) Nikola Kuzmanov
Assistant coach	(North Macedonia) Mijalche Proshev
Goalkeeper coach	(North Macedonia) Aleksandar Mitrev
Physiotherapist	(North Macedonia) Simeon Efremov
Fitness coach	(North Macedonia) Lazar Ilijev
Doctor	(North Macedonia) Gjeorgji Stojchev
Security person	(North Macedonia) Goran Trajkov
Security person	(North Macedonia) Igor Nakov
Administrator / Club representative	(North Macedonia) Aleksandar Ivanov

== Historical list of coaches ==
- (Socialist Federal Republic of Yugoslavia) Vladimir Beara
- (North Macedonia) Vlatko Kostov (1 Jul 2003 - Feb 2005)
- (North Macedonia) Gordan Zdravkov (27 Feb 2005 - Jun 2005)
- (Bulgaria) Nikola Spasov (Jul 2005 - Dec 2005)
- (North Macedonia) Kiril Dojčinovski (15 Dec 2005 - Sep 2006)
- (North Macedonia) Sase Stefanov (1 Oct 2006 - Dec 2006)
- (North Macedonia) Dragan Hristovski (8 Dec 2006 - Jun 2010)
- (North Macedonia) Nikola Kuzmanov (Jul 2010 – Feb 2011)
- (North Macedonia) Dragan Hristovski (25 Feb 2011 - Jun 2011)
- (North Macedonia) Ilija Mitrov (2011)
- (Bulgaria) Nikola Spasov (30 Jul 2011 - 19 Oct 2011)
- (North Macedonia) Vlatko Davitkov (caretaker) (19 Oct 2011 - 27 Oct 2011)
- (North Macedonia) Trajče Senev (27 Oct 2011 – 30 Jun 2012)
- (Bulgaria) Nikola Spasov (1 Jul 2012 - Jan 2013)
- (North Macedonia) Dobrinko Ilievski (3 Feb 2013 - 20 Dec 2013)
- (Turkey) Ali Güneş (23 Dec 2013 – 30 Jun 2014)
- (North Macedonia) Gjore Jovanovski (1 Jul 2014 - 4 Nov 2014)
- (North Macedonia) Dragan Hristovski (interim) (4 Nov 2014 - Dec 2014)
- (Bulgaria) Nikola Spasov (4 Nov 2014 - Dec 2014)
- (North Macedonia) Vlatko Kostov (4 Jan 2015 - 29 Aug 2015)
- (North Macedonia) Igor Stojanov (30 Aug 2015 - 14 Sep 2015)
- (North Macedonia) Toni Jakimovski (15 Sep 2015 – 8 Mar 2016)
- (North Macedonia) Igor Stojanov (9 Mar 2016 - 30 Aug 2016)
- (Turkey) Yüksel Yeşilova (31 Aug 2016 - 3 Nov 2016)
- (North Macedonia) Zdravko Cvetanoski (3 Nov 2016 – 14 Mar 2017)
- (North Macedonia) Nikola Kuzmanov (14 Mar 2017 – Nov 2017)
- (Bulgaria) Emil Grnev (Dec 2017 - 30 Sep 2018)
- (North Macedonia) Zoran Sterjovski (Oct 2018 - 2019)
- (North Macedonia) Dobrinko Ilievski (Jul 2019–2020)
- (North Macedonia) Marjan Sekulovski (Nov 2020–2021)
- (North Macedonia) Ilčo Gjorgioski (Jan 2022–2023)
