= 2005–06 Macedonian Football Cup =

Tournament details
- Country: Macedonia
- Dates: 31 July 2005 – 24 May 2006
- Teams: 32

Final positions
- Champions: Makedonija G.P. (1st title)
- Runners-up: Shkëndija

Tournament statistics
- Matches played: 45
- Goals scored: 159 (3.53 per match)

The 2005–06 Macedonian Football Cup was the 14th season of Macedonia's football knockout competition. Bashkimi were the defending champions, having won their first title. The 2005–06 champions were Makedonija G.P. who won their first title as well.

== Competition calendar ==
| Round | Date(s) | Fixtures | Clubs | New entries |
|---|---|---|---|---|
| First Round | 31 July 2005 | 16 | 32 → 16 | 32 |
| Second Round | 14 September & 19 October 2005 | 16 | 16 → 8 | none |
| Quarter-finals | 2 & 30 November 2005 | 8 | 8 → 4 | none |
| Semi-finals | 5 April & 10 May 2006 | 4 | 4 → 2 | none |
| Final | 24 May 2006 | 1 | 2 → 1 | none |

== First round ==
Matches were played on 31 July 2005.

| Team 1 | Score | Team 2 |
|---|---|---|
31 July 2005
| Arsimi (3) | 1–9 | Belasica (1) |
| Tiverija (3) | 0–5 | Renova (1) |
| Borec (3) | 0–3 | Napredok (2) |
| Ohrid 2004 (3) | 0–3 | Makedonija G.P. (1) |
| Novaci (2) | 0–1 | Sileks (1) |
| Teteks (2) | 3–1 | Turnovo (2) |
| Karaorman (2) | 2–2 (5–4 p) | Rabotnichki Kometal (1) |
| Lokomotiva (3) | 1–0 | Sloga Jugomagnat (2) |
| Milano (3) | 4–5 | Bashkimi (1) |
| Osogovo (3) | 2–6 | Vëllazërimi (1) |
| Skopje (2) | 0–1 | Vardar (1) |
| Kadino (2) | 0–13 | Bregalnica Kraun (1) |
| 11 Oktomvri (3) | 0–3 | Cementarnica (1) |
| Pelister (2) | 0–2 | Shkëndija 79 (1) |
| Mladost Sushica (2) | 0–2 | Pobeda (1) |
| Kozhuf (3) | 6–1 | Madjari Solidarnost (2) |

== Second round ==
The first legs were played on 14 September and second were played on 19 October 2005.

| Team 1 | Agg. | Team 2 | 1st leg | 2nd leg |
|---|---|---|---|---|
| Bregalnica Kraun (1) | 4–3 | Bashkimi (1) | 2–1 | 2–2 |
| Vardar (1) | 5–0 | Kozhuf (3) | 3–0 | 2–0 |
| Pobeda (1) | 5–2 | Vëllazërimi (1) | 3–0 | 2–2 |
| Belasica (1) | 1–5 | Sileks (1) | 1–2 | 0–3 |
| Makedonija G.P. (1) | 4–2 | Napredok (2) | 2–0 | 2–2 |
| Shkëndija 79 (1) | 5–1 | Renova (1) | 4–0 | 1–1 |
| Cementarnica (1) | 4–2 | Karaorman (2) | 3–2 | 1–0 |
| Teteks (2) | 4–3 | Lokomotiva (3) | 3–1 | 1–2 |

== Quarter-finals ==
The first legs were played on 2 November and second were played on 30 November 2005.

=== Summary ===
| Team 1 | Agg. | Team 2 | 1st leg | 2nd leg |
|---|---|---|---|---|
| Shkëndija 79 (1) | 4–2 | Pobeda (1) | 2–0 | 2–2 |
| Sileks (1) | 6–2 | Teteks (2) | 3–0 | 3–2 |
| Vardar (1) | 1–3 | Bregalnica Kraun (1) | 1–3 | 0–0 |
| Makedonija G.P. (1) | 2–0 | Cementarnica (1) | 1–0 | 1–0 |

=== Matches ===
2 November 2005
13:00 CET

| Shkëndija 79 (1) | 2–0 | Pobeda (1) |
|---|---|---|
| Emurlahu 38'; Emini 90' | Report |

Gradski stadion, Tetovo
Attendance: 2,000
Referee: Ljubomir Krstevski (Bitola)
30 November 2005
13:00 CET

| Pobeda (1) | 2–2 | Shkëndija 79 (1) |
|---|---|---|
| Kapinkovski 56' (pen.); Manevski 89' | Report | Aleksovski 31'; Ibraimi 84' |

Stadion Goce Delchev, Prilep
Attendance: 2,500
Referee: Marjan Markoski (Ohrid)

Shkëndija 79 won 4–2 on aggregate.

2 November 2005
13:00 CET

| Sileks (1) | 3–0 | Teteks (2) |
|---|---|---|
| Ristić 25'; Todorovski 34'; Janevski 44' | Report |

Stadion Sileks, Kratovo
Attendance: 400
Referee: Vladimir Kiprijanovski (Skopje)
30 November 2005
13:00 CET

| Teteks (2) | 2–3 | Sileks (1) |
|---|---|---|
| Radončić 30'; Gegovski 90' | Report | Ristić 60', 75'; Dimitrovski 86' |

Gradski stadion, Tetovo
Attendance: 400
Referee: Dejan Jakimovski (Skopje)

Sileks won 6–2 on aggregate.

2 November 2005
13:00 CET

| Vardar (1) | 1–3 | Bregalnica Kraun (1) |
|---|---|---|
| Sekulovski 18' | Report | Spasovski 33'; Dimitrovski 38'; Andonov 73' |

Gradski stadion, Skopje
Attendance: 50
Referee: Borka Smokvoski (Prilep)
30 November 2005
13:00 CET

| Bregalnica Kraun (1) | 0–0 | Vardar (1) |
|---|---|---|
| | Report |

Gradski stadion, Shtip
Attendance: 800
Referee: Zoran Boshkov (Negotino)

Bregalnica Kraun won 3–1 on aggregate.

2 November 2005
13:00 CET

| Makedonija G.P. (1) | 1–0 | Cementarnica 55 (1) |
|---|---|---|
| Brnjarchevski 90' | Report |

Stadion Gjorche Petrov, Skopje
Attendance: 500
Referee: Dimitar Mechkarovski (Skopje)
30 November 2005
13:00 CET

| Cementarnica 55 (1) | 0–1 | Makedonija G.P. (1) |
|---|---|---|
| | Report | Milošević 80' |

Stadion Cementarnica, Skopje
Attendance: 400
Referee: Dimitar Mechkarovski (Skopje)

Makedonija G.P. won 2–0 on aggregate.

== Semi-finals ==
The first legs were played on 5 April and the second on 10 May 2006.

=== Summary ===
| Team 1 | Agg. | Team 2 | 1st leg | 2nd leg |
|---|---|---|---|---|
| Shkëndija 79 (1) | 2–1 | Bregalnica Kraun (1) | 1–1 | 1–0 |
| Makedonija G.P. (1) | 3–2 | Sileks (1) | 1–1 | 2–1 |

=== Matches ===
5 April 2006
16:00 CEST

| Shkëndija 79 (1) | 1–1 | Bregalnica Kraun (1) |
|---|---|---|
| Pollozhani 37' | Report | Đilas 5' |

Gradski stadion, Tetovo
Attendance: 6,500
Referee: Ljubomir Krstevski (Bitola)
10 May 2006
16:00 CEST

| Bregalnica Kraun (1) | 0−1 | Shkëndija 79 (1) |
|---|---|---|
| | Report | Pollozhani 77' |

Gradski stadion, Shtip
Attendance: 2,500
Referee: Dimitar Mechkarovski (Skopje)

Shkëndija 79 won 2–1 on aggregate.

5 April 2006
16:00 CEST

| Makedonija G.P. (1) | 1–1 | Sileks (1) |
|---|---|---|
| Milošević 23' | Report | Brković 35' |

Stadion Gjorche Petrov, Skopje
Attendance: 1,000
Referee: Ilir Sela (Struga)
10 May 2006
16:00 CEST

| Sileks (1) | 1−2 | Makedonija G.P. (1) |
|---|---|---|
| Divjak 13' | Report | Milošević 64'; Ismaili 76' |

Stadion Sileks, Kratovo
Attendance: 1,000
Referee: Marjan Markoski (Ohrid)

Makedonija G.P. won 3–2 on aggregate.

== Final ==
24 May 2006
19:00 CEST

| Makedonija G.P. (1) | 3–2 | Shkëndija 79 (1) |
|---|---|---|
| Stefanov 68' (o.g.); Ivanovski 85', 90+3' | Report 1 Report 2 | Pollozhani 59'; Mustafi 78' |

Gradski stadion, Skopje
Attendance: 11,000
Referee: Ljubomir Krstevski (Bitola)

== See also ==
- 2005–06 Macedonian First Football League
- 2005–06 Macedonian Second Football League
