= 2002–03 Macedonian Football Cup =

Tournament details
- Country: Macedonia
- Dates: 4 August 2002 – 28 May 2003
- Teams: 32

Final positions
- Champions: Cementarnica (1st title)
- Runners-up: Sloga Jugomagnat

Tournament statistics
- Matches played: 45
- Goals scored: 145 (3.22 per match)

The 2002–03 Macedonian Football Cup was the 11th season of Macedonia's football knockout competition. Pobeda were the defending champions, having won their first title. The 2002–03 champions were Cementarnica 55 who won their first title as well.

== Competition calendar ==
| Round | Date(s) | Fixtures | Clubs | New entries |
|---|---|---|---|---|
| First Round | 4 August 2002 | 16 | 32 → 16 | 32 |
| Second Round | 25 September & 30 October 2002 | 16 | 16 → 8 | none |
| Quarter-finals | 2, 27 November 2002 | 8 | 8 → 4 | none |
| Semi-finals | 19 March & 23 April 2003 | 4 | 4 → 2 | none |
| Final | 28 May 2003 | 1 | 2 → 1 | none |

== First round ==
Matches were played on 4 August 2002.

| Team 1 | Score | Team 2 |
|---|---|---|
4 August 2002
| Bashkimi (2) | 1–3 | Pobeda (1) |
| Vëllazërimi (2) | 2–5 | Belasica (1) |
| Pobeda Valandovo (2) | 0–2 | Pelister (1) |
| Sloga Jugomagnat (1) | 2–0 | Turnovo (2) |
| Makedonija G.P. (1) | 2–1 | Karaorman (2) |
| Madjari Solidarnost (2) | 0–1 | Napredok (1) |
| Lokomotiva (3) | 1–1 (5–4 p) | Osogovo (2) |
| Voska (3) | 1–3 | Cementarnica (1) |
| Gostivar (3) | 2–4 | Rabotnichki Kometal (1) |
| Malesh (3) | 0–4 | Vardar (1) |
| Zletovica (3) | 0–5 | Sileks (1) |
| Belo Brdo (3) | 2–5 | Borec (2) |
| Prespa (3) | 0–5 | Kozhuf (2) |
| 11 Oktomvri (2) | 2–2 (4–3 p) | Bregalnica Delchevo (1) |
| Bitola (3) | 0–2 | Teteks (2) |
| Tikvesh (1) | 2–0 | Kumanovo (1) |

== Second round ==
The first legs were played on 25 September and second were played on 30 October 2002.

| Team 1 | Agg. | Team 2 | 1st leg | 2nd leg |
|---|---|---|---|---|
| Belasica (1) | 1–1 (3–1 p) | Pobeda (1) | 1–1 | 1–1 (a.e.t.) |
| Pelister (1) | 2–4 | Sloga Jugomagnat (1) | 1–1 | 1–3 |
| Rabotnichki Kometal (1) | 3–3 (a) | Cementarnica (1) | 1–3 | 2–0 |
| Teteks (2) | 1–1 (3–4 p) | Vardar (1) | 1–0 | 0–1 (a.e.t.) |
| Makedonija G.P. (1) | 2–7 | Napredok (1) | 1–4 | 1–3 |
| Kozhuf (2) | 1–3 | Tikvesh (1) | 0–0 | 1–3 |
| Sileks (1) | 10–2 | 11 Oktomvri (2) | 5–0 | 5–2 |
| Lokomotiva (3) | 3–2 | Borec (2) | 0–1 | 3–1 |

== Quarter-finals ==
The first legs were played on 6 November and second were played on 27 November 2002.

=== Summary ===
| Team 1 | Agg. | Team 2 | 1st leg | 2nd leg |
|---|---|---|---|---|
| Belasica (1) | (a) 2–2 | Vardar (1) | 1–0 | 1–2 |
| Napredok (1) | 2–4 | Sileks (1) | 1–0 | 1–4 |
| Cementarnica (1) | 9–2 | Lokomotiva (3) | 6–1 | 3–1 |
| Tikvesh (1) | 0–4 | Sloga Jugomagnat (1) | 0–2 | 0–2 |

=== Matches ===
6 November 2002
13:00 CET

| Belasica (1) | 1–0 | Vardar (1) |
|---|---|---|
| Andonov 85' | Report |

Stadion Mladost, Strumica
Attendance: 1,000
Referee: Angel Bungurov (Kavadarci)
27 November 2002
13:00 CET

| Vardar (1) | 2–1 | Belasica (1) |
|---|---|---|
| Oliveira 74', 82' | Report | Tanushev 80' |

Gradski stadion, Skopje
Attendance: 250
Referee: Delcho Jakimovski (Skopje)

2–2 on aggregate. Belasica won on away goals.

6 November 2002
13:00 CET

| Napredok (1) | 1–0 | Sileks (1) |
|---|---|---|
| Siveski 33' | Report |

Gradski stadion, Kichevo
Attendance: 1,200
Referee: Emil Bozhinovski (Skopje)
27 November 2002
13:00 CET

| Sileks (1) | 4–1 | Napredok (1) |
|---|---|---|
| Trpenovski 20', 47'; Gligorovski 80', 88' | Report | Toleski 22' |

Stadion Sileks, Kratovo
Attendance: 400
Referee: Toni Gligorov (Strumica)

Sileks won 4–1 on aggregate.

6 November 2002
13:00 CET

| Cementarnica 55 (1) | 6–1 | Lokomotiva (3) |
|---|---|---|
| Naumov 4', 11', 62', 90'; Trpkovski 30'; Hristovski 33' | Report | Slavkovikj 44' |

Stadion Cementarnica, Skopje
Attendance: 100
Referee: Aleksandar Maksimovski (Skopje)
27 November 2002
13:00 CET

| Lokomotiva (3) | 1–3 | Cementarnica 55 (1) |
|---|---|---|
| Zikovski 57' | Report | Delovski 10'; Toleski 21'; Jakovlevski 79' |

Stadion Lokomotiva, Skopje
Attendance: 50
Referee: Delcho Jakimovski (Skopje)

Cementarnica 55 won 9–2 on aggregate.

6 November 2002
13:00 CET

| Tikvesh (1) | 0–2 | Sloga Jugomagnat (1) |
|---|---|---|
| | Report | Demiri 43', 48' |

Gradski stadion, Kavadarci
Attendance: 300
Referee: Sasho Lazarevski (Kumanovo)
27 November 2002
13:00 CET

| Sloga Jugomagnat (1) | 2–0 | Tikvesh (1) |
|---|---|---|
| Bajram 66'; Nuhiu 84' | Report |

Stadion Chair, Skopje
Attendance: 400
Referee: Borka Smokvoski (Prilep)

Sloga Jugomagnat won 4–0 on aggregate.

== Semi-finals ==
The first legs were played on 19 March and the second were played on 23 April 2003.

=== Summary ===
| Team 1 | Agg. | Team 2 | 1st leg | 2nd leg |
|---|---|---|---|---|
| Cementarnica (1) | 2–1 | Sileks (1) | 1–0 | 1–1 |
| Belasica (1) | 1–2 | Sloga Jugomagnat (1) | 1–1 | 0–1 |

=== Matches ===
19 March 2003
14:30 CET

| Cementarnica 55 (1) | 1–0 | Sileks (1) |
|---|---|---|
| Savov 38' | Report |

Stadion Cementarnica, Skopje
Referee: Bekim Bauta (Struga)
23 April 2003
16:00 CEST

| Sileks (1) | 1−1 | Cementarnica 55 (1) |
|---|---|---|
| Gligorovski 37' | Report | Blessing 60' |

Stadion Sileks, Kratovo
Referee: Bekim Bauta (Struga)

Cementarnica 55 won 2–1 on aggregate.

19 March 2003
14:30 CET

| Belasica (1) | 1–1 | Sloga Jugomagnat (1) |
|---|---|---|
| Baldovaliev 17' | Report | Beganović 67' |

Stadion Mladost, Strumica
Referee: Sasho Lazarevski (Kumanovo)
23 April 2003
16:00 CEST

| Sloga Jugomagnat (1) | 1−0 | Belasica (1) |
|---|---|---|
| Savić 9' (pen.) | Report |

Stadion Chair, Skopje
Referee: Sasho Lazarevski (Kumanovo)

Sloga Jugomagnat won 2–1 on aggregate.

== Final ==
27 May 2003
20:00 CEST

| Cementarnica 55 (1) | 4–4 (a.e.t.) | Sloga Jugomagnat (1) |
|---|---|---|
| Blessing 28'; Ahil 40' (o.g.); Savov 44' (pen.); Wandeir 68' | Report 1 Report 2 | Savić 3'; Ar. Nuhiji 45+2', 52'; Hristovski 83' (o.g.) |
Penalties
| Gligorov (penalty scored); Dimitrovski (penalty missed); Hristovski (penalty scored); Cvetkovski (penalty scored) | 3–2 | (penalty missed) Savić; (penalty scored) Mustafi; (penalty missed) Bajram; (penalty scored) Ramadani; (penalty missed) Ar. Nuhiji |

Gradski stadion, Skopje
Attendance: 7,000
Referee: Delcho Jakimovski (Skopje)

== See also ==
- 2002–03 Macedonian First Football League
- 2002–03 Macedonian Second Football League
