= 2005–06 Macedonian Second Football League =

Macedonian Second League
- Season: 2005–06
- Champions: Pelister
- Promoted: Pelister; Napredok
- Relegated: Novaci; Mladost Sushica

The 2005–06 Macedonian Second Football League was the fourteenth season since its establishment. It began on 6 August 2005 and ended on 20 May 2006.

== Participating teams ==
Location of teams in 2005–06 Macedonian Second League

Club	City	Stadium	Capacity
Karaorman	Struga	Stadion Gradska Plazha	500
Lozar	Demir Kapija	Gradski stadion Demir Kapija	500
Madjari Solidarnost	Skopje	Stadion Boris Trajkovski	3,000
Metalurg	Skopje	Stadion Zhelezarnica	3,000
Mladost	Sushica	Stadion Sushica	1,500
Napredok	Kichevo	Gradski stadion Kichevo	5,000
Novaci 2005	Novaci	Stadion Novaci	500
Pelister	Bitola	Stadion Tumbe Kafe	8,000
Skopje	Skopje	Stadion Avtokomanda	4,000
Sloga Jugomagnat	Skopje	Chair Stadium	6,000
Teteks	Tetovo	Gradski stadion Tetovo	15,000
Turnovo	Turnovo	Stadion Kukush	1,500

== League table ==
Pos	Team	Pld	W	D	L	GF	GA	GD	Pts	Promotion or relegation
1	Pelister (C, P)	30	19	4	7	52	22	+30	61	Promotion to Macedonian First League
2	Napredok (P)	30	15	7	8	44	39	+5	52	Promotion to Macedonian First League
3	Karaorman	30	15	5	10	47	38	+9	50	Qualification to Promotion play-off
4	Madjari Solidarnost	30	11	8	11	33	30	+3	41	Qualification to Promotion play-off
5	Sloga Jugomagnat	30	11	7	12	35	39	−4	40	
6	Skopje	30	11	7	12	30	36	−6	40	
7	Turnovo	30	11	6	13	39	36	+3	39	
8	Metalurg	30	10	7	13	29	36	−7	37	
9	Lozar	30	10	7	13	34	45	−11	37	
10	Teteks (O)	30	11	2	17	36	45	−9	35	Qualification to Relegation play-off
11	Novaci 2005 (R)	30	9	4	17	29	42	−13	31	Relegation to Macedonian Third League
–	Mladost Sushica (Note: Mladost Sushica was removed from competition after round 15. All matches annulled.) (R)	15	1	3	11	8	31	−23	0	Relegation to Macedonian Third League

Source: MacedonianFootball.com, RSSSF.org
Rules for classification: 1) Points; 2) Head-to-head points; 3) Head-to-head goal difference; 4) Head-to-head away goals scored
(C) Champions; (O) Play-off winners; (P) Promoted; (R) Relegated

== Results ==
Every team will play three times against each other team for a total of 33 matches. The first 22 matchdays will consist of a regular double round-robin schedule. The league standings at this point will then be used to determine the games for the last 11 matchdays.

=== Matches 1–22 ===
Home \ Away	KAR	LOZ	MAS	MET	NAP	NOV	PEL	SKO	SLO	TET	TUR
Karaorman	—	3–1	1–2	2–0	3–1	1–0	1–1	4–1	4–1	4–1	2–0
Lozar	3–3	—	3–0	0–0	1–0	1–1	1–0	2–1	1–0	2–0	1–0
Madjari Solidarnost	1–0	0–0	—	1–1	3–3	3–1	0–1	0–1	2–0	1–0	1–0
Metalurg	2–0	2–1	2–1	—	1–2	1–0	0–2	1–1	2–1	1–0	0–1
Napredok	1–0	2–1	1–0	3–0	—	2–1	1–1	4–3	2–1	1–0	1–1
Novaci 2005	0–1	4–1	1–0	1–0	2–0	—	2–1	3–0	1–0	0–1	1–1
Pelister	1–0	2–0	4–0	1–0	2–0	3–1	—	4–2	1–0	3–2	2–0
Skopje	1–1	1–1	2–0	1–0	3–0	3–0	0–2	—	2–0	1–0	1–0
Sloga Jugomagnat	0–1	2–0	0–0	3–2	1–1	1–0	2–2	1–0	—	1–0	4–3
Teteks	2–1	2–1	1–2	4–1	2–1	2–0	0–1	3–1	3–0	—	0–0
Turnovo	1–1	5–0	0–0	1–0	4–1	2–1	2–2	1–0	0–1	3–0	—

Source: RSSSF.org
Legend: Blue = home team win; Yellow = draw; Red = away team win.

=== Matches 23–33 ===
Home \ Away	KAR	LOZ	MAS	MET	NAP	NOV	PEL	SKO	SLO	TET	TUR
Karaorman	—	3–1	—	—	1–0	3–1	—	0–0	—	3–2	—
Lozar	—	—	—	1–1	—	2–2	—	—	2–1	4–0	—
Madjari Solidarnost	2–0	1–2	—	—	—	6–1	—	—	—	2–1	3–0
Metalurg	3–1	—	1–1	—	—	2–1	—	—	—	2–1	1–0
Napredok	—	1–0	2–1	1–1	—	—	2–1	—	2–2	—	4–1
Novaci 2005	—	—	—	—	1–2	—	1–0	2–0	0–0	—	—
Pelister	5–0	6–1	1–0	1–0	—	—	—	—	1–2	—	1–0
Skopje	—	1–0	0–0	1–1	0–0	—	1–0	—	1–0	—	—
Sloga Jugomagnat	3–1	—	0–0	2–1	—	—	—	—	—	1–1	5–3
Teteks	—	—	—	—	1–3	2–0	1–0	3–1	—	—	—
Turnovo	1–2	1–0	—	—	—	1–0	—	3–0	—	4–1	—

Source: RSSSF.org
Legend: Blue = home team win; Yellow = draw; Red = away team win.

== Promotion playoff ==
28 May 2006
17:00 CEST

Bregalnica Kraun	3–3 (a.e.t.)	Karaorman
Davitkov 31', 35' (pen.); Đilas 102'	Report	Delioski 51'; Mimini 82'; Dalchevski 98'
Penalties
Zdravkov (penalty scored); Andonov (penalty scored); Dimitrovski (penalty scored); Stanković (penalty scored)	4–3	(penalty scored) Stepanovski; (penalty scored) Vasilev; (penalty scored) Klechkarovski; (penalty missed) Pereski; (penalty missed) Shaleski

Gradski stadion, Skopje
Attendance: 4,000
Referee: Emil Bozhinovski (Skopje)

28 May 2006
17:00 CEST

Sileks	1–0	Madjari Solidarnost
Ristić 4'	Report

Stadion Goce Delchev, Prilep
Attendance: 800
Referee: Dragi Stojanovski (Kumanovo)

== Relegation playoff ==
11 June 2006
17:00 CEST

Tiverija	0–0 (a.e.t.)	Ilinden Velmej
Penalties
	5–6

Gradski stadion, Skopje

11 June 2006
17:00 CEST

Teteks	1–0	Kozhuf
Ferati 20'

Stadion Gjorche Petrov, Skopje

11 June 2006
17:00 CEST

Milano	1–0	Gostivar
Ristov 40'

Stadion Boris Trajkovski, Skopje

== See also ==
- 2005–06 Macedonian Football Cup
- 2005–06 Macedonian First Football League
