= 2003–04 Macedonian Football Cup =

Tournament details
- Country: Macedonia
- Dates: 3 August 2003 – 23 May 2004
- Teams: 32

Final positions
- Champions: Sloga Jugomagnat (3rd title)
- Runners-up: Napredok

Tournament statistics
- Matches played: 45
- Goals scored: 160 (3.56 per match)

The 2003–04 Macedonian Football Cup was the 12th season of Macedonia's football knockout competition. Cementarnica 55 were the defending champions, having won their first title. The 2003–04 champions were Sloga Jugomagnat who won their third title after appearing in their eighth Final in nine seasons.

== Competition calendar ==
Round	Date(s)	Fixtures	Clubs	New entries
First Round	3 August 2003	16	32 → 16	32
Second Round	1, 22 October 2003	16	16 → 8	none
Quarter-finals	26 November & 2 December 2003	8	8 → 4	none
Semi-finals	3 March & 14 April 2004	4	4 → 2	none
Final	23 May 2004	1	2 → 1	none

== First round ==
Matches were played on 3 August 2003.

Team 1	Score	Team 2
3 August 2003
Sileks (1)	1–1 (2–4 p)	Madjari Solidarnost (1)
Makedonija G.P. (2)	1–0	11 Oktomvri (2)
Sloga Vinica (3)	2–4	Pelister (2)
Gostivar (3)	1–3	Tikvesh (1)
Turnovo (2)	5–0	Kozhuf (3)
Malesh (3)	2–3	Bregalnica Delchevo (1)
Shkëndija 79 (2)	2–0	Karaorman (3)
Voska (3)	0–9	Osogovo (2)
Bratstvo Resen (2)	0–2	Pobeda (1)
Lozar (3)	1–0	Bashkimi (1)
Proleter (4)	1–16	Vardar (1)
Borec (2)	1–5	Napredok (1)
Belasica (1)	3–1	Kumanovo (2)
Rabotnichki Kometal (1)	4–0	Vëllazërimi (2)
Bregalnica Shtip (2)	2–5	Cementarnica (1)
Novaci (3)	1–3	Sloga Jugomagnat (1)

== Second round ==
The first legs were played on 1 October and second were played on 22 October 2003.

Team 1	Agg.	Team 2	1st leg	2nd leg
Makedonija G.P. (2)	4–7	Rabotnichki Kometal (1)	1–4	3–3
Napredok (1)	4–2	Shkëndija 79 (2)	3–1	1–1
Belasica (1)	2–5	Sloga Jugomagnat (1)	2–2	0–3
Turnovo (2)	0–2	Tikvesh (1)	0–1	0–1
Madjari Solidarnost (1)	2–1	Pelister (2)	1–0	1–1
Osogovo (2)	3–4	Lozar (2)	2–0	1–4
Vardar (1)	(a) 3–3	Cementarnica (1)	1–1	2–2
Bregalnica Delchevo (1)	3–5	Pobeda (1)	1–2	2–3

== Quarter-finals ==
The first legs were played on 26 and 27 November and second were played on 3 and 4 December 2003.

=== Summary ===
Team 1	Agg.	Team 2	1st leg	2nd leg
Vardar (1)	2–3	Pobeda (1)	1–1	1–2
Napredok (1)	4–2	Lozar (2)	3–0	1–2
Rabotnichki Kometal (1)	3–1	Tikvesh (1)	2–0	1–1
Sloga Jugomagnat (1)	4–3	Madjari Solidarnost (1)	2–1	2–2

=== Matches ===
26 November 2003
17:00 CET

Vardar (1)	1–1	Pobeda (1)
Zaharievski 78'	Report	Dimitrovski 50'

Gradski stadion, Skopje
Attendance: 250
Referee: Delcho Jakimovski (Skopje)
3 December 2003
13:00 CET

Pobeda (1)	2–1	Vardar (1)
Krstev 45'; N. Zdraveski 83'	Report	Blessing 36'

Stadion Goce Delchev, Prilep
Attendance: 3,000
Referee: Bekim Bauta (Struga)

Pobeda won 3–2 on aggregate.

26 November 2003
13:00 CET

Napredok (1)	3–0	Lozar (2)
Nicheski 15'; Toleski 32', 45'

Gradski stadion, Kichevo
3 December 2003
13:00 CET

Lozar (2)	2–1	Napredok (1)
Elezov 62'; Ivanov 64' (pen.)	Report	Toleski 70'

Gradski stadion, Demir Kapija
Attendance: 500
Referee: Zorancho Ilievski (Bitola)

Napredok won 4–2 on aggregate.

26 November 2003
13:00 CET

Rabotnichki Kometal (1)	2–0	Tikvesh (1)
Stojanov 12', 14'

Gradski stadion, Skopje
3 December 2003
13:00 CET

Tikvesh (1)	1–1	Rabotnichki Kometal (1)
Mojsov 56'	Report	Janev 53'

Gradski stadion, Kavadarci
Attendance: 500
Referee: Borka Smokovski (Prilep)

Rabotnichki Kometal won 3–1 on aggregate.

27 November 2003
13:00 CET

Sloga Jugomagnat (1)	2–1	Madjari Solidarnost (1)
Ramadani 17'; Savić 47'	Report	Maksimovski 44'

Stadion Chair, Skopje
Attendance: 0
Referee: Dimitar Mechkarovski (Skopje)
4 December 2003
13:00 CET

Madjari Solidarnost (1)	2–2	Sloga Jugomagnat (1)
Maksimovski 60'; Ivanovski 85'	Report	Savić 44'; Nuhiji 83'

Stadion Madjari, Skopje
Attendance: 300
Referee: Dimitar Mechkarovski (Skopje)

Sloga Jugomagnat won 4–3 on aggregate.

== Semi-finals ==
The first legs were played on 10 March and the second on 15 April 2004.

=== Summary ===
Team 1	Agg.	Team 2	1st leg	2nd leg
Pobeda (1)	2–2 (a)	Napredok (1)	2–1	0–1
Rabotnichki Kometal (1)	2–2 (a)	Sloga Jugomagnat (1)	2–1	0–1

=== Matches ===
10 March 2004
14:00 CET

Pobeda (1)	2–1	Napredok (1)
Krstev 30', 56'	Report	Mickoski 70'

Stadion Goce Delchev, Prilep
Attendance: 500
Referee: Bekim Bauta (Struga)
15 April 2004
16:00 CEST

Napredok (1)	1−0	Pobeda (1)
Mojsoski 17'	Report

Gradski stadion, Kichevo
Attendance: 2,000
Referee: Aleksandar Stavrev (Skopje)

2–2 on aggregate. Napredok won on away goals.

10 March 2004
14:00 CET

Rabotnichki Kometal (1)	2–1	Sloga Jugomagnat (1)
Ilijoski 40'; Toleski 60'	Report	Savić 35'

Gradski stadion, Skopje
Attendance: 300
Referee: Dimitar Mechkarovski (Skopje)
15 April 2004
16:00 CEST

Sloga Jugomagnat (1)	1−0	Rabotnichki Kometal (1)
Savić 52'	Report

Stadion Chair, Skopje
Attendance: 2,500
Referee: Emil Bozhinovski (Skopje)

2–2 on aggregate. Sloga Jugomagnat won on away goals.

== Final ==
23 May 2004
20:00 CEST

Napredok (1)	0–1	Sloga Jugomagnat (1)
	Report 1 Report 2	Beqiri 50'

Gradski stadion, Skopje
Attendance: 3,000
Referee: Emil Bozhinovski (Skopje)

== See also ==
- 2003–04 Macedonian First Football League
- 2003–04 Macedonian Second Football League
