= 2007–08 Macedonian Second Football League =

Macedonian Second League
- Season: 2007–08
- Champions: Turnovo
- Promoted: Turnovo; Metalurg
- Relegated: Alumina; Karaorman; Vëllazërimi; Ilinden Velmej

The 2007–08 Macedonian Second Football League was the sixteenth season since its establishment. It began on 4 August 2007 and ended on 1 June 2008.

== Participating teams ==
Location of teams in 2007–08 Macedonian Second League

Club	City	Stadium	Capacity
Alumina	Skopje	Stadion Ilinden	5,000
Belasica	Strumica	Stadion Mladost	6,370
Bregalnica 2008	Shtip	Gradski stadion Shtip	4,000
Drita	Bogovinje	Stadion Bogovinje	500
Ilinden	Velmej	Stadion Velmej	
Karaorman	Struga	Stadion Gradska Plazha	500
Lokomotiva	Skopje	Stadion Komunalec	1,000
Madjari Solidarnost	Skopje	Stadion Boris Trajkovski	3,000
Metalurg	Skopje	Stadion Zhelezarnica	3,000
Miravci	Miravci	Stadion Miravci	1,000
Nov Milenium	Sushica	Stadion Sushica	1,500
Ohrid 2004	Ohrid	SRC Biljanini Izvori	3,000
Skopje	Skopje	Stadion Avtokomanda	4,000
Sloga Jugomagnat	Skopje	Chair Stadium	6,000
Teteks	Tetovo	Gradski stadion Tetovo	15,000
Horizont Turnovo	Turnovo	Stadion Kukush	1,500
Vardar Dekamel	Negotino	Gradski stadion Negotino	1,500
Vëllazërimi	Kichevo	Gradski stadion Kichevo	5,000

== League table ==
Pos	Team	Pld	W	D	L	GF	GA	GD	Pts	Promotion or relegation
1	Horizont Turnovo (C, P)	32	22	5	5	58	23	+35	71	Promotion to Macedonian First League
2	Metalurg (P)	32	20	7	5	47	24	+23	67	Promotion to Macedonian First League
3	Miravci	32	20	5	7	60	22	+38	65	Qualification to Promotion play-off
4	Belasica	32	16	7	9	49	37	+12	55	Qualification to Promotion play-off
5	Skopje	32	16	6	10	53	44	+9	54	
6	Drita	32	13	8	11	47	30	+17	47	
7	Teteks	32	14	5	13	32	30	+2	47	
8	Sloga Jugomagnat	32	13	5	14	36	34	+2	44	
9	Ohrid	32	12	5	15	43	53	−10	41	
10	Madjari Solidarnost	32	12	4	16	33	39	−6	40	
11	Nov Milenium	32	10	9	13	41	36	+5	39	
12	Alumina (Note: Alumina was declined their participation in the next season due to the technical problems. The club was later merged with Bregalnica Shtip.)	32	10	9	13	28	37	−9	39	
13	Vardar Negotino	32	11	6	15	42	58	−16	39	
14	Lokomotiva (O)	32	12	2	18	40	47	−7	38	Qualification to Relegation play-off
15	Bregalnica Shtip (R)	32	9	10	13	36	43	−7	37	Relegation to Macedonian Third League
16	Karaorman (R)	32	8	2	22	23	57	−34	26	Relegation to Macedonian Third League
17	Vëllazërimi (R)	32	4	5	23	28	82	−54	17	Relegation to Macedonian Third League
–	Ilinden Velmej (Note: Ilinden Velmej was removed from competition after 14th round. All matches annulled.) (R)	0	0	0	0	0	0	0	0	Relegation to Macedonian Third League

Source: MacedonianFootball.com, Soccerway
Rules for classification: 1) Points; 2) Head-to-head points; 3) Head-to-head goal difference; 4) Head-to-head away goals scored
(C) Champions; (O) Play-off winners; (P) Promoted; (R) Relegated

== Results ==
Home \ Away	ALU	BEL	BRE	DRI	KAR	LOK	MAS	MET	MIR	NMI	OHR	SKO	SLO	TET	TUR	VDK	VLZ
Alumina	—	0–1	0–0	0–0	1–0	1–0	3–2	1–2	0–2	1–0	1–1	1–5	2–1	0–2	0–2	0–2	2–0
Belasica	0–1	—	2–0	0–0	2–0	1–0	3–1	2–0	0–0	3–1	2–1	4–3	1–5	2–1	1–2	3–1	6–0
Bregalnica Shtip	1–1	2–2	—	1–1	3–0	3–1	0–2	0–0	2–1	2–2	2–2	0–0	2–1	2–0	1–3	4–2	2–1
Drita	1–1	1–1	2–1	—	3–1	2–3	4–0	2–3	0–1	2–1	0–1	7–0	1–0	2–0	1–1	4–0	6–0
Karaorman	0–1	1–0	1–0	1–0	—	1–0	2–1	1–2	0–1	2–2	1–0	3–4	1–2	1–0	0–2	1–1	3–2
Lokomotiva	0–1	3–2	1–2	1–2	2–0	—	2–0	1–2	1–2	1–0	3–1	0–1	0–1	2–0	0–1	2–1	1–1
Madjari Solidarnost	2–1	2–0	3–0	2–0	2–0	0–2	—	1–0	2–1	1–0	2–0	0–0	1–1	0–1	1–1	4–2	0–1
Metalurg	1–1	2–0	2–1	0–1	3–1	2–1	0–0	—	2–1	1–0	3–0	2–1	0–0	1–0	1–0	3–1	4–1
Miravci	2–0	0–2	1–0	3–0	5–0	6–0	2–1	0–1	—	4–0	3–2	2–0	3–0	1–1	1–1	5–1	3–0
Nov Milenium	1–1	3–4	3–0	1–1	4–0	3–0	1–0	2–3	1–1	—	1–0	1–1	0–0	2–0	1–2	4–1	2–0
Ohrid	1–0	3–0	1–0	2–0	1–0	3–0	1–0	0–0	1–2	1–3	—	3–1	3–1	0–0	1–3	0–0	6–0
Skopje	3–1	1–0	2–0	0–0	4–2	1–0	1–0	1–1	2–0	1–1	4–2	—	1–0	2–1	1–2	2–0	7–0
Sloga Jugomagnat	1–0	0–0	1–1	1–0	3–0	1–0	0–1	0–2	0–1	1–0	4–1	2–0	—	3–0	1–2	2–0	2–1
Teteks	1–1	0–1	0–1	2–1	1–0	1–1	1–0	1–0	2–1	1–0	4–1	2–0	1–0	—	0–1	3–1	2–0
Horizont Turnovo	2–1	0–1	2–1	2–1	2–0	1–3	2–0	2–1	0–2	0–0	7–0	3–0	3–0	3–1	—	2–0	3–0
Vardar Dekamel	1–4	2–2	1–0	0–1	1–0	0–3	5–1	1–1	0–0	1–0	5–1	3–2	2–1	0–0	1–0	—	2–1
Vëllazërimi	0–0	1–1	2–2	0–1	2–0	4–6	2–1	0–2	0–3	0–1	1–3	1–2	4–1	0–3	1–1	2–4	—

Source: RSSSF.org
Legend: Blue = home team win; Yellow = draw; Red = away team win.

== Promotion playoff ==
8 June 2008
16:30 CEST

Sileks	2–0	Belasica
Gligorov 22'; Stojanovski 70'

Gradski stadion, Skopje

8 June 2008
16:30 CEST

Bashkimi	4–1	Miravci
Ismaili 45'; Trajchev 47'; Živadinović 50'; Đorović 90'		Karakamishev 86'

Stadion Tumbe Kafe, Bitola

== Relegation playoff ==
7 June 2008
16:30 CEST

Lokomotiva	2–2	Osogovo
Penalties
	3–2

Gradski stadion, Kavadarci

7 June 2008
16:30 CEST

Lepenec	1–2	Novaci 2005

Stadion Mladost, Strumica

7 June 2008
16:30 CEST

Kozhuf	3–1	Ljuboten

Stadion Goce Delchev, Prilep

== See also ==
- 2007–08 Macedonian Football Cup
- 2007–08 Macedonian First Football League
