= 2008–09 Macedonian Football Cup =

Tournament details
- Country: Macedonia
- Dates: 17 September 2008 – 24 May 2009
- Teams: 32

Final positions
- Champions: Rabotnichki (2nd title)
- Runners-up: Makedonija G.P.

Tournament statistics
- Matches played: 41
- Goals scored: 100 (2.44 per match)

The 2008–09 Macedonian Football Cup was the 17th season of Macedonia's football knockout competition. Rabotnichki defended their title, having won their second title.

== Competition calendar ==
Round	Date(s)	Fixtures	Clubs	New entries
First Round	17 September 2008	16	32 → 16	32
Second Round	22, 29, 30 October 2008	16	16 → 8	none
Quarter-finals	26 November & 7, 10 December 2008	8	8 → 4	none
Semi-finals	8 April & 6 May 2009	4	4 → 2	none
Final	24 May 2009	1	2 → 1	none

== First round ==
The draw was held on 21 June 2008 in Skopje. Matches were played on 17 September 2008.

Team 1	Score	Team 2
17 September 2008
Fortuna (3)	2–3	Pobeda (1)
Ohrid 2004 (2)	3–0 (w/o)	Bashkimi (1)
Bregalnica Shtip (2)	0–3 (w/o)	Horizont Turnovo (1)
Vardino (3)	0–4	Milano (1)
Karaorman (3)	0–3 (w/o)	Belasica (2)
Gostivar (3)	0–3 (w/o)	Miravci (2)
Teteks (2)	0–1	Makedonija G.P. (1)
Lokomotiva (2)	0–2	Rabotnichki (1)
Nov Milenium (2)	1–0	Cementarnica (2)
Kravari (3)	0–4	Shkëndija 79 (2)
Babuna (2)	0–3	Vardar (1)
Sloga Jugomagnat (1)	2–4	Renova (1)
11 Oktomvri (3)	0–1	Metalurg (1)
Vëllazërimi (2)	0–2	Sileks (1)
Kozhuf (2)	1–4	Pelister (1)
Drita (2)	2–1	Napredok (1)

== Second round ==
The draw was held on 22 September 2008 in Skopje. The first legs were played on 22 October 2008 and second on 29 and 30 October 2008.

Team 1	Agg.	Team 2	1st leg	2nd leg
Metalurg (1)	0–1	Milano (1)	0–1	0–0
Vardar (1)	1–3	Renova (1)	1–1	0–2
Rabotnichki (1)	3–0	Nov Milenium (2)	1–0	2–0
Drita (2)	1–5	Miravci (2)	1–1	0–4
Sileks (1)	2–0	Belasica (2)	2–0	0–0
Pelister (1)	6–1	Horizont Turnovo (1)	4–0	2–1
Pobeda (1)	1–5	Makedonija G.P. (1)	1–1	0–4
Shkëndija 79 (2)	5–1	Ohrid 2004 (2)	3–0	2–1

== Quarter-finals ==
The draw was held on 6 November 2008 in Skopje. The first legs were played on 26 November 2008 and the second were played on 6 and 10 December 2008.

=== Summary ===
Team 1	Agg.	Team 2	1st leg	2nd leg
Renova (1)	0–1	Rabotnichki (1)	0–0	0–1
Sileks (1)	1–4	Milano (1)	0–2	1–2
Pelister (1)	3–4	Shkëndija 79 (2)	3–1	0–3
Miravci (2)	1–4	Makedonija G.P. (1)	1–1	0–3

=== Matches ===
26 November 2008
13:00 CET

Renova (1)	0–0	Rabotnichki (1)

Gradski stadion, Tetovo
10 December 2008
13:00 CET

Rabotnichki (1)	1–0	Renova (1)
Perendija 60'

Gradski stadion, Skopje

Rabotnichki won 1–0 on aggregate.

26 November 2008
13:00 CET

Sileks (1)	0–2	Milano (1)
		Donev 40' (o.g.); Manevski 80'

Stadion Sileks, Kratovo
10 December 2008
13:00 CET

Milano (1)	2–1	Sileks (1)
Kukaj 7'; Isufi 83'		Nacev 10'

Milano Arena, Kumanovo

Milano won 4–1 on aggregate.

26 November 2008
13:00 CET

Pelister (1)	3–1	Shkëndija 79 (2)
Momirovski 4'; Glavevski 50'; Presilski 76'		Useini 88'

Stadion Tumbe Kafe, Bitola
10 December 2008
13:00 CET

Shkëndija 79 (2)	3–0	Pelister (1)
Beqiri 10'; Hasani 39'; Nuhiji 82'

Gradski stadion, Tetovo

Shkëndija 79 won 4–3 on aggregate.

26 November 2008
13:00 CET

Miravci (2)	1–1	Makedonija G.P. (1)
Todorov 83'		Ilievski 76'

Stadion Miravci, Miravci
6 December 2008
13:00 CET

Makedonija G.P. (1)	3–0	Miravci (2)
Lena 17', 49'; Jovanovski 44'

Stadion Gjorche Petrov, Skopje

Makedonija G.P. won 4–1 on aggregate.

== Semi-finals ==
The draw was held on 25 December 2008 in Skopje. The first legs were played on 8 April 2009 and the second were played on 6 May 2009.

=== Summary ===
Team 1	Agg.	Team 2	1st leg	2nd leg
Rabotnichki (1)	3–2	Shkëndija 79 (2)	3–1	0–1
Makedonija G.P. (1)	2–1	Milano (1)	2–0	0–1

=== Matches ===
8 April 2009
16:00 CEST

Rabotnichki (1)	3−1	Shkëndija 79 (2)
Osmani 60'; Wandeir 61'; Zé Carlos 68'		Hasani 35'

Philip II Arena, Skopje
Referee: Marjan Eckoski (Ohrid)
6 May 2009
16:30 CEST

Shkëndija 79 (2)	1−0	Rabotnichki (1)
Hasani 5'

Gradski stadion, Tetovo
Referee: Zoran Boshkov (Negotino)

Rabotnichki won 3–2 on aggregate.

8 April 2009
16:00 CEST

Makedonija G.P. (1)	2−0	Milano (1)
de Brito 62'; Milevski 83'

Stadion Gjorche Petrov, Skopje
Referee: Zoran Boshkov (Negotino)
6 May 2009
16:30 CEST

Milano (1)	1−0	Makedonija G.P. (1)
Geshoski 54'

Milano Arena, Kumanovo
Referee: Stevche Shulevski (Ohrid)

Makedonija G.P. won 2–1 on aggregate.

== Final ==
24 May 2009
16:30 CEST

Makedonija G.P. (1)	1–1 (a.e.t.)	Rabotnichki (1)
Klechkarovski 65'	Report 1 Report 2	Pandev 90'
Penalties
Brnjarchevski (penalty scored); de Brito (penalty missed); Klechkarovski (penalty scored); Ilievski (penalty scored); Milevski (penalty scored); Lena (penalty scored); Jovanovski (penalty missed)	5–6	(penalty scored) Wandeir; (penalty scored) Zé Carlos; (penalty scored) Trajchev; (penalty scored) Dimovski; (penalty missed) Perendija; (penalty scored) Savić; (penalty scored) Pandev

Philip II Arena, Skopje
Attendance: 3,500
Referee: Dimitar Mechkarovski (Skopje)

== See also ==
- 2008–09 Macedonian First Football League
- 2008–09 Macedonian Second Football League
