= 2008–09 Macedonian Second Football League =

Macedonian Second League
- Season: 2008–09
- Champions: Teteks
- Promoted: Teteks; Sloga Jugomagnat
- Relegated: Kozhuf; Vardar Negotino; Madjari Solidarnost; Nov Milenium

The 2008–09 Macedonian Second Football League was the seventeenth season since its establishment. It began on 2 August 2008 and ended on 30 May 2009.

== Participating teams ==
Location of teams in 2008–09 Macedonian Second League

Club	City	Stadium	Capacity
Belasica	Strumica	Stadion Mladost	6,370
Bregalnica 2008	Shtip	Gradski stadion Shtip	4,000
Cementarnica 55	Skopje	Stadion Cementarnica	2,000
Drita	Bogovinje	Stadion Bogovinje	500
Kozhuf	Gevgelija	Gradski Stadion Gevgelija	2,500
Lokomotiva	Skopje	Stadion Komunalec	1,000
Madjari Solidarnost	Skopje	Stadion Boris Trajkovski	3,000
Miravci	Miravci	Stadion Miravci	1,000
Nov Milenium	Sushica	Stadion Sushica	1,500
Novaci 2005	Novaci	Stadion Novaci	500
Ohrid 2004	Ohrid	SRC Biljanini Izvori	3,000
Skopje	Skopje	Stadion Avtokomanda	4,000
Sloga Jugomagnat	Skopje	Chair Stadium	6,000
Shkëndija 79	Tetovo	Gradski stadion Tetovo	15,000
Teteks	Tetovo	Gradski stadion Tetovo	15,000
Vardar Dekamel	Negotino	Gradski stadion Negotino	1,500

== League table ==
Pos	Team	Pld	W	D	L	GF	GA	GD	Pts	Promotion or relegation
1	Teteks (C, P)	29	18	9	2	50	13	+37	63	Promotion to Macedonian First League
2	Sloga Jugomagnat (P)	29	17	8	4	31	12	+19	59	Promotion to Macedonian First League
3	Shkëndija	29	15	10	4	67	29	+38	55	Qualification to Promotion play-off
4	Bregalnica Shtip	29	14	9	6	45	21	+24	51	Qualification to Promotion play-off
5	Drita	29	15	5	9	45	30	+15	50	
6	Lokomotiva	29	14	6	9	47	29	+18	48	
7	Miravci	29	10	12	7	36	25	+11	42	
8	Skopje	29	12	4	13	38	38	0	40	
9	Belasica	29	10	8	11	34	33	+1	38	
10	Novaci	29	9	4	16	35	50	−15	31	
11	Ohrid	29	8	6	15	31	50	−19	30	
12	Cementarnica 55	29	8	5	16	25	45	−20	29	
13	Kozhuf (R)	29	6	8	15	28	50	−22	26	Qualification to Relegation play-off
14	Vardar Negotino (R)	29	6	7	16	25	75	−50	25	Relegation to Macedonian Third League
15	Madjari Solidarnost (R)	29	6	5	18	32	54	−22	23	Relegation to Macedonian Third League
16	Nov Milenium (Note: Nov Milenium withdrew their participation prior to the start of the second half of the season.) (R)	15	2	4	9	12	27	−15	10	Relegation to Macedonian Third League

Source: MacedonianFootball.com, Soccerway
Rules for classification: 1) Points; 2) Head-to-head points; 3) Head-to-head goal difference; 4) Head-to-head away goals scored
(C) Champions; (P) Promoted; (R) Relegated

== Results ==
Home \ Away	BEL	BRE	CEM	DRI	KOŽ	LOK	MAS	MIR	NMI	NOV	OHR	SKO	SLO	SKE	TET	VDK
Belasica	—	0–0	1–0	0–0	0–0	1–1	0–3	0–0	—	4–1	3–1	0–1	0–2	2–0	2–0	1–2
Bregalnica Shtip	1–0	—	5–0	2–2	3–1	1–0	2–0	1–0	2–0	1–2	0–2	0–0	4–2	0–0	0–1	6–0
Cementarnica 55	0–1	1–1	—	0–2	1–0	0–1	1–0	3–2	—	1–1	2–3	1–0	1–0	0–0	0–2	1–0
Drita	2–0	0–0	3–1	—	5–1	2–1	3–1	3–1	3–1	2–1	3–0	1–2	2–0	0–2	1–4	2–1
Kozhuf	1–4	2–2	1–0	2–2	—	1–2	3–0	0–0	—	0–1	1–2	1–0	0–2	3–3	0–3	1–1
Lokomotiva	2–0	0–4	2–0	0–1	2–0	—	3–1	2–1	2–1	0–0	2–0	0–1	1–0	3–2	1–1	10–0
Madjari Solidarnost	1–1	2–1	2–2	0–1	4–2	1–1	—	0–0	—	4–1	2–2	0–2	2–1	0–4	0–1	4–1
Miravci	2–0	0–0	3–0	2–1	0–3	2–1	4–0	—	2–2	2–0	1–1	1–0	4–1	0–0	0–0	1–0
Nov Milenium	1–1	—	0–2	—	1–1	—	2–1	—	—	—	2–0	1–2	—	0–1	—	—
Novaci	2–1	0–2	3–1	1–1	3–0	1–2	2–1	0–2	4–0	—	4–3	0–1	0–2	1–1	0–1	5–1
Ohrid	1–1	0–1	0–1	1–0	0–1	2–6	1–0	1–1	—	1–0	—	0–2	3–1	0–1	1–6	2–0
Skopje	1–2	2–3	1–0	1–0	0–1	2–0	1–0	0–0	2–0	1–0	2–2	—	1–1	2–3	0–0	4–2
Sloga Jugomagnat	2–3	1–0	3–1	1–0	2–0	0–0	3–1	1–0	—	1–0	1–0	0–0	—	0–0	1–0	0–0
Shkëndija	3–1	3–0	3–2	1–2	4–0	1–1	4–1	1–1	—	4–1	5–2	0–0	6–2	—	0–2	7–1
Teteks	2–0	0–0	2–0	2–1	1–1	2–1	3–0	1–1	3–0	6–0	1–0	0–0	1–0	2–2	—	1–1
Vardar Dekamel	1–5	0–3	3–3	1–0	2–1	1–0	2–1	1–1	1–1	2–1	0–0	1–3	0–3 (Note: Match awarded)	0–6	0–2	—

Source: Soccerway
Legend: Blue = home team win; Yellow = draw; Red = away team win.

== Promotion playoff ==
13 June 2009
16:30 CEST

Metalurg	5–1	Bregalnica Shtip
Đurić 10'; Ilijoski 15', 75'; Mihajlović 79'; Velkoski 89'		Novakov 55'

Stadion Goce Delchev, Prilep
Referee: Goran Spirkoski (Prilep)

13 June 2009
16:30 CEST

Pelister	3–0	Shkëndija 79
Glavevski 64', 68'; Dimitrovski 85'

Stadion Mladost, Strumica
Referee: Vladimir Kiprijanovski (Skopje)

== Relegation playoff ==
17 June 2009
16:30 CEST

Kozhuf	2–3	11 Oktomvri

Philip II Arena, Skopje

17 June 2009
16:30 CEST

Vlaznimi	2–1	Lepenec

Stadion Goce Delchev, Prilep

17 June 2009
16:30 CEST

Osogovo	0–1	Vëllazërimi

Stadion Mladost, Strumica

== See also ==
- 2008–09 Macedonian Football Cup
- 2008–09 Macedonian First Football League
