= 2007–08 Macedonian First Football League =

Macedonian First League
- Season: 2007–08
- Dates: 5 August 2007 – 31 May 2008
- Champions: Rabotnichki; 3rd domestic title
- Relegated: Shkëndija; Cementarnica 55
- Champions League: Rabotnichki
- UEFA Cup: Milano; Pelister
- Intertoto Cup: Renova
- Matches: 198
- Goals: 489 (2.47 per match)
- Top goalscorer: Ivica Gligorovski (15 goals)
- Biggest home win: Milano 9–1 Vardar (11 May 2008)
- Biggest away win: Shkëndija 1–5 Pobeda (31 May 2008)
- Highest scoring: Milano 9–1 Vardar (11 May 2008)

The 2007–08 Macedonian First League was the 16th season of the Macedonian First Football League, the highest football league of Macedonia. The first matches of the season were played on 5 August 2007. Pobeda were the defending champions, having won their second title. The 2007-08 champions were Rabotnichki who won their third title.

== Promotion and relegation ==
At the start of the 2007–08 season

Promoted from 2006–07 Second League

- Milano (winners)
- Cementarnica 55 (runners-up)

Relegated to 2007–08 Second League

- Bregalnica Kraun (11th)
- Vëllazërimi (12th)

At the end of the 2007–08 season

Promoted from 2007–08 Second League

- Horizont Turnovo (winners)
- Metalurg Skopje (runners-up)

Relegated to 2008–09 Second League

- Shkëndija (11th)
- Cementarnica 55 (12th)
- Bashkimi (10th)^{1}

1 Bashkimi was withdraw from the First League due to financial reasons.

== Participating teams ==
Location of teams in 2007–08 Macedonian First League

Club	City	Stadium	Capacity
Bashkimi	Kumanovo	Milano Arena	3,500
Cementarnica 55	Skopje	Stadion Cementarnica	2,000
Makedonija G.P.	Skopje	Stadion Gjorche Petrov	3,000
Milano	Kumanovo	Milano Arena	3,500
Napredok	Kichevo	Gradski stadion Kichevo	5,000
Pelister	Bitola	Stadion Tumbe Kafe	8,000
Pobeda	Prilep	Stadion Goce Delchev	15,000
Rabotnichki Kometal	Skopje	Gradski stadion Skopje	18,104
Renova	Djepchishte	Gradski stadion Tetovo	15,000
Shkëndija	Tetovo	Gradski stadion Tetovo	15,000
Sileks	Kratovo	Stadion Sileks	5,000
Vardar	Skopje	Gradski stadion Skopje	18,104

== League table ==
Pos	Team	Pld	W	D	L	GF	GA	GD	Pts	Qualification or relegation
1	Rabotnichki Kometal (C)	33	24	7	2	51	11	+40	79	Qualification for the Champions League first qualifying round
2	Milano	33	21	3	9	74	36	+38	66	Qualification for the UEFA Cup first qualifying round
3	Pelister	33	17	7	9	42	27	+15	58	Qualification for the UEFA Cup first qualifying round
4	Vardar	33	12	11	10	45	40	+5	47 (Note: Head-to-head record: Vardar 7 pts, Renova 1 pts.)	Ineligible for 2008–09 European competitions (Note: Vardar failed to get the UEFA license for the competition due to financial problems.)
5	Renova	33	13	8	12	34	34	0	47	Qualification for the Intertoto Cup first round
6	Pobeda	33	12	9	12	48	48	0	45	
7	Makedonija G.P.	33	13	5	15	34	42	−8	44	
8	Napredok	33	11	9	13	38	49	−11	42	
9	Sileks (O)	33	10	11	12	33	36	−3	41	Qualification for the relegation playoff
10	Bashkimi (O)	33	8	6	19	40	63	−23	30	Qualification for the relegation playoff
11	Shkëndija (R)	33	7	5	21	26	57	−31	26	Relegation to the Macedonian Second League
12	Cementarnica 55 (R)	33	5	9	19	24	46	−22	24	Relegation to the Macedonian Second League

Source: MacedonianFootball.com, RSSSF.org
Rules for classification: 1) Points; 2) Goal difference; 3) Goals scored; 4) Head-to-head points; 5) Head-to-head goal difference; 6) Head-to-head away goals scored (only if two teams); 7) Head-to-head goals scored; 8) Draw; 9) Play-off. (Note: Criteria 2, 3 and 8 is only used if not deciding Champion, teams for UEFA competitions or relegation).
(C) Champions; (O) Play-off winners; (R) Relegated

== Results ==
Every team will play three times against each other team for a total of 33 matches. The first 22 matchdays will consist of a regular double round-robin schedule. The league standings at this point will then be used to determine the games for the last 11 matchdays.

Home \ Away	BAS	CEM	MGP	MIL	NAP	PEL	POB	RAB	REN	SKE	SIL	VAR	BAS	CEM	MGP	MIL	NAP	PEL	POB	RAB	REN	SKE	SIL	VAR
Bashkimi	—	0–2	5–4	2–2	4–1	0–0	3–4	0–4	1–3	1–0	0–2	1–1	—	1–1	—	—	—	—	2–0	1–0	—	—	2–0	2–0
Cementarnica 55	3–0	—	0–1	1–2	0–0	0–1	0–2	0–1	1–0	1–1	1–1	2–2	—	—	—	2–1	1–0	0–1	—	—	0–3	1–1	—	—
Makedonija	3–0	1–0	—	3–0	1–0	0–2	2–1	0–0	2–1	4–1	1–1	1–1	3–0	2–0	—	—	1–0	—	—	—	—	1–0	0–0	—
Milano	4–2	5–1	5–0	—	3–1	3–0	4–0	1–2	3–0	1–0	4–0	1–0	2–1	—	2–0	—	3–0	—	2–1	—	—	4–0	—	9–1
Napredok	2–0	2–1	1–0	2–1	—	1–1	1–0	0–2	3–1	2–0	2–1	0–0	1–0	—	—	—	—	—	4–3	0–0	—	4–3	—	5–3
Pelister	1–0	2–1	1–0	3–0	1–1	—	1–1	0–0	1–1	3–0	1–0	2–1	1–3	—	2–0	3–2	1–0	—	4–0	—	—	1–0	—	—
Pobeda	2–1	4–3	4–1	4–1	4–1	2–1	—	0–0	0–0	1–1	1–0	0–0	—	1–1	2–0	—	—	—	—	2–0	0–1	—	1–1	0–2
Rabotnichki	1–0	0–0	3–0	1–0	3–0	1–0	4–2	—	3–0	2–0	4–1	1–0	—	2–0	1–0	3–1	—	0–0	—	—	2–0	—	1–0	—
Renova	1–1	2–0	2–1	1–2	2–1	1–0	2–0	0–1	—	1–0	1–1	1–1	0–0	—	2–0	1–2	0–0	2–1	—	—	—	2–0	—	—
Shkëndija	1–0	1–0	0–0	1–3	2–1	1–0	3–0 (Note: Match awarded because Pobeda's players were not showed on the pitch.)	1–2	0–2	—	0–1	0–1	4–3	—	—	—	—	—	1–5	0–3 (Note: Match abandoned at the half-time by the result 0–1 after the Rabotnichki's players were attacked by the fans of home team. Later, the match was awarded to Rabotnichki.)	—	—	1–2	1–0
Sileks	4–3	2–0	1–0	0–0	1–1	2–3	1–0	1–2	0–0	1–1	—	1–1	—	2–0	—	0–1	2–1	1–1	—	—	3–0	—	—	—
Vardar	6–1	1–0	4–1	0–0	5–1	1–0	0–0	0–0	1–0	4–1	1–0	—	—	1–1	0–1	—	—	1–3	—	1–2	3–1	—	2–1	—

Source: RSSSF.org
Legend: Blue = home team win; Yellow = draw; Red = away team win.

== Relegation playoff ==
8 June 2008
16:30 CEST

Sileks	2–0	Belasica
Gligorov 22'; Stojanovski 70'

Gradski stadion, Skopje

8 June 2008
16:30 CEST

Bashkimi	4–1	Miravci
Ismaili 45'; Trajchev 47'; Živadinović 50'; Đorović 90'		Karakamishev 86'

Stadion Tumbe Kafe, Bitola

== Top goalscorers ==
Rank	Player	Club	Goals
1	(North Macedonia) Ivica Gligorovski	Milano	15
2	(Serbia) Saša Stojanović	Milano	14
3	(North Macedonia) Besart Ibraimi	Napredok	12
3	(Bosnia and Herzegovina) Boško Stupić	Sileks	12
5	(North Macedonia) Argjend Beqiri	Renova & Shkëndija	11
6	(North Macedonia) Jovan Kostovski	Vardar	10
7	(North Macedonia) Borche Manevski	Pobeda & Milano	9
7	(North Macedonia) Ivan Trichkovski	Rabotnichki	9
7	(Serbia) Predrag Živadinović	Bashkimi	9

Source: Macedonian Football (in English)

== See also ==
- 2007–08 Macedonian Football Cup
- 2007–08 Macedonian Second Football League
