= 2007–08 Macedonian Football Cup =

Tournament details
- Country: Macedonia
- Dates: 19 September 2007 – 24 May 2008
- Teams: 32

Final positions
- Champions: Rabotnichki (1st title)
- Runners-up: Milano

Tournament statistics
- Matches played: 42
- Goals scored: 138 (3.29 per match)

The 2007–08 Macedonian Football Cup was the 16th season of Macedonia's football knockout competition. Vardar were the defending champions, having won their fifth title. The 2007–08 champions were Rabotnichki Kometal who won their first title.

== Competition calendar ==
Round	Date(s)	Fixtures	Clubs	New entries
First Round	19 September 2007	16	32 → 16	32
Second Round	23, 24 October & 6, 7 November 2007	16	16 → 8	none
Quarter-finals	28 November & 12 December 2007	8	8 → 4	none
Semi-finals	9 April & 7 May 2008	4	4 → 2	none
Final	24 May 2008	1	2 → 1	none

== First round ==
The draw was held on 5 September 2007 in Skopje. Matches were played on 19 September 2007.

Team 1	Score	Team 2
19 September 2007
Gostivar (3)	3–6	Vardar (1)
Novaci (3)	0–0 (3–4 p)	Teteks (2)
Nov Milenium (2)	1–1 (5–3 p)	Turnovo (2)
Filip Vtori (3)	0–0 (4–5 p)	Napredok (1)
Vardar Negotino (2)	10–3	Vëllazërimi (2)
Arsimi (4)	0–4	Makedonija G.P. (1)
Drita (2)	0–1	Skopje (2)
Ilinden Velmej (2)	0–0 (5–4 p)	Pobeda (1)
Metalurg (2)	0–4	Sileks (1)
Pobeda Valandovo (3)	0–1	Bregalnica Shtip (2)
Prevalec (3)	0–6	Pelister (1)
Vlaznimi (3)	2–4	Renova (1)
Fortuna (3)	0–1	Shkëndija 79 (1)
Malesh (3)	1–8	Milano (1)
Kadino (3)	0–13	Rabotnichki Kometal (1)
Bratstvo Resen (3)	0–3 (w/o)	Bashkimi (1)

== Second round ==
The draw was held on 17 October 2007 in Skopje. The first legs were played on 23 and 24 October and second on 6 and 7 November 2007.

Team 1	Agg.	Team 2	1st leg	2nd leg
Pelister (1)	0–4	Rabotnichki Kometal (1)	0–0	0–4
Bashkimi (1)	3–6	Makedonija G.P. (1)	3–4	0–2
Ilinden Velmej (2)	2–1	Shkëndija 79 (1)	0–1	2–0
Milano (1)	5–0	Bregalnica Shtip (2)	3–0	2–0
Vardar Negotino (2)	3–7	Nov Milenium (2)	2–3	1–4
Teteks (2)	0–4	Vardar (1)	0–3	0–1
Renova (1)	6–2	Napredok (1)	5–1	1–1
Sileks (1)	1–2	Skopje (2)	0–1	1–1

== Quarter-finals ==
The draw was held on 17 November 2007 in Skopje. The first legs were played on 28 November and the second were played on 12 December 2007.

=== Summary ===
Team 1	Agg.	Team 2	1st leg	2nd leg
Makedonija G.P. (1)	2–1	Skopje (2)	2–1	0–0
Rabotnichki Kometal (1)	2–1	Vardar (1)	2–0	0–1
Nov Milenium (2)	6–0 (w/o)	Ilinden Velmej (2)	–	–
Milano (1)	4–2	Renova (1)	2–0	2–2

=== Matches ===
28 November 2007
13:00 CET

Makedonija G.P. (1)	2–1	Skopje (2)
Brnjarchevski 2'; Stojanovski 83'	Report	Popovski 85'

Gjorche Petrov Stadium, Skopje
Attendance: 150
Referee: Zoran Petkovski (Veles)
12 December 2007
13:00 CET

Skopje (2)	0–0	Makedonija G.P. (1)
	Report

Stadion Avtokomanda, Skopje
Attendance: 100
Referee: Zoran Petkovski (Veles)

Makedonija G.P. won 4–1 on aggregate.

28 November 2007
13:00 CET

Rabotnichki (1)	2–0	Vardar (1)
Braga 62' (o.g.); Pejčić 68'	Report

Gradski stadion, Skopje
Attendance: 150
Referee: Vladimir Kiprijanovski (Skopje)
12 December 2007
13:00 CET

Vardar (1)	1–0	Rabotnichki (1)
Savić 68'	Report

Gradski stadion, Skopje
Attendance: 300
Referee: Vladimir Kiprijanovski (Skopje)

Rabotnichki Kometal won 2–1 on aggregate.

28 November 2007
13:00 CET

Nov Milenium (2)	3–0 (Awarded)	Ilinden Velmej (2)

Stadion Sushica, Sushica
12 December 2007
13:00 CET

Ilinden Velmej (2)	0–3 (Awarded)	Nov Milenium (2)

Stadion Velmej, Velmej

Nov Milenium won 6–0 on aggregate.

28 November 2007
13:00 CET

Milano (1)	2–0	Renova (1)
Ristov 10'; Stojanović 22'	Report

Milano Arena, Kumanovo
Attendance: 1,000
Referee: Dimitar Mechkarovski (Skopje)
12 December 2007
13:00 CET

Renova (1)	2–2	Milano (1)
Beqiri 50'; P. Stojanov 71'	Report	Stojanović 22', 60'

Gradski stadion, Tetovo
Attendance: 1,500
Referee: Dimitar Mechkarovski (Skopje)

Milano won 4–2 on aggregate.

== Semi-finals ==
The draw was held on 12 January 2008 in Skopje. The first legs were played on 9 April and the second were played on 7 May 2008.

=== Summary ===
Team 1	Agg.	Team 2	1st leg	2nd leg
Rabotnichki Kometal (1)	(a) 1–1	Makedonija G.P. (1)	0–0	1–1
Milano (1)	6–1	Nov Milenium (2)	4–0	2–1

=== Matches ===
9 April 2008
16:00 CEST

Rabotnichki Kometal (1)	0−0	Makedonija G.P. (1)

Gradski stadion, Skopje
Referee: Dimitar Mechkarovski (Skopje)
7 May 2008
16:00 CEST

Makedonija G.P. (1)	1−1	Rabotnichki Kometal (1)
Jovanovski 88'		Janchevski 53'

Stadion Gjorče Petrov, Skopje
Referee: Dimitar Mechkarovski (Skopje)

1–1 on aggregate. Rabotnichki Kometal won on away goals.

9 April 2008
16:00 CEST

Milano (1)	4−0	Nov Milenium (2)
Krstev 45'; Alimi 75'; Brando 85'; Stojanović 90'

Milano Arena, Kumanovo
7 May 2008
16:00 CEST

Nov Milenium (2)	1−2	Milano (1)
Mitrov 48'		Lazarevski 55'; Usufi 65'

Stadion Sushica, Sushica
Referee: Zoran Petkovski (Veles)

Milano won 6–1 on aggregate.

Sources: Dnevnik.mk: , (archived)

== Final ==
24 May 2008
16:30 CEST

Milano (1)	0–2	Rabotnichki Kometal (1)
	Report 1 Report 2	Nexhipi 26', 42'

Gradski stadion, Skopje
Attendance: 5,000
Referee: Zoran Petkovski (Veles)

== See also ==
- 2007–08 Macedonian First Football League
- 2007–08 Macedonian Second Football League
