= 1998–99 Macedonian First Football League =

Macedonian First League
- Season: 1998–99
- Dates: 9 August 1998 – 29 May 1999
- Champions: Sloga Jugomagnat; 1st domestic title
- Relegated: Skopje; Balkan
- Champions League: Sloga Jugomagnat
- UEFA Cup: Sileks; Vardar
- Intertoto Cup: Pobeda; Cementarnica
- Matches played: 182
- Goals scored: 534 (2.93 per match)
- Top goalscorer: Rogério Oliveira (22 goals)
- Biggest home win: Sileks 7–1 Balkan (18 October 1998); Pobeda 6–0 Skopje (9 August 1998); Sileks 6–0 Skopje (13 September 1998); Vardar 6–0 Tikvesh (27 September 1998); Borec 6–0 Balkan (23 May 1999)
- Biggest away win: Pelister 0–5 Sloga (25 October 1998)
- Highest scoring: Vardar 7–2 Balkan (18 April 1999)

The 1998–99 Macedonian First League was the 7th season of the Macedonian First Football League, the highest football league of Macedonia. The first matches of the season were played on 9 August 1998 and the last on 29 May 1999. Sileks were the defending champions, having won their third title in a row. The 1998-99 champions were Sloga Jugomagnat who had won their first title.

== Promotion and relegation ==
At the start of the 1998–99 season

Promoted from 1997–98 Second League

- Rabotnichki Kometal (Winners; West)
- Osogovo (Winners; East)

Relegated to 1998–99 Second League

- Belasica (13th)
- Bregalnica Shtip (14th)^{1}

At the end of the 1998–99 season

Promoted from 1998–99 Second League

- Napredok (Winners; West)
- Kumanovo (Winners; East)

Relegated to 1999–2000 Second League

- Skopje (13th)
- Balkan BISI (14th)

1 Bregalnica Shtip was removed from the league after the round 19, due to their absence in a scheduled match against Sloga Jugomagnat. Their matches from round 14 were annulled.

== Participating teams ==
Location of teams in 1998–99 Macedonian First League

Club	City	Stadium
Balkan BISI	Skopje	Chair Stadium
Borec MHK	Veles	Gradski stadion Veles
Cementarnica 55	Skopje	Stadion Cementarnica
Makedonija Asiba	Skopje	Stadion Gjorche Petrov
Osogovo	Kochani	Stadion Nikola Mantov
Pelister	Bitola	Stadion Tumbe Kafe
Pobeda	Prilep	Stadion Goce Delchev
Rabotnichki Kometal	Skopje	Gradski stadion Skopje
Sasa	Makedonska Kamenica	Gradski stadion Makedonska Kamenica
Sileks	Kratovo	Stadion Sileks
Skopje	Skopje	Stadion Zhelezarnica
Sloga Jugomagnat	Skopje	Chair Stadium
Tikvesh	Kavadarci	Gradski stadion Kavadarci
Vardar	Skopje	Gradski stadion Skopje

== League table ==
Pos	Team	Pld	W	D	L	GF	GA	GD	Pts	Qualification or relegation
1	Sloga Jugomagnat (C)	26	19	3	4	41	12	+29	60	Qualification for the Champions League first qualifying round
2	Sileks	26	17	6	3	63	22	+41	57	Qualification for the UEFA Cup qualifying round
3	Pobeda	26	17	2	7	51	18	+33	53	Qualification for the Intertoto Cup first round
4	Vardar	26	15	4	7	61	32	+29	49	Qualification for the UEFA Cup qualifying round (Note: Vardar qualified for the UEFA Cup qualifying round by winning the 1998–99 Macedonian Football Cup.)
5	Cementarnica 55	26	14	2	10	47	37	+10	44	Qualification for the Intertoto Cup first round
6	Makedonija	26	10	7	9	44	40	+4	37	
7	Tikvesh	26	10	6	10	34	37	−3	36	
8	Borec	26	8	8	10	31	35	−4	32	
9	Rabotnichki Kometal	26	9	5	12	38	46	−8	32	
10	Pelister	26	7	8	11	30	50	−20	29	
11	Sasa	26	7	5	14	28	38	−10	26	
12	Osogovo	26	7	4	15	27	47	−20	25	
13	Skopje (R)	26	5	2	19	25	59	−34	17	Relegation to the Macedonian Second League
14	Balkan (R)	26	4	4	18	14	61	−47	16	Relegation to the Macedonian Second League

Source: MacedonianFootball.com, RSSSF.org
Rules for classification: 1) Points; 2) Goal difference; 3) Goals scored; 4) Head-to-head points; 5) Head-to-head goal difference; 6) Head-to-head away goals scored (only if two teams); 7) Head-to-head goals scored; 8) Draw; 9) Play-off. (Note: Criteria 2, 3 and 8 is only used if not deciding Champion, teams for UEFA competitions or relegation).
(C) Champions; (R) Relegated

== Results ==
Home \ Away	BAL	BOR	CEM	MGP	OSO	PEL	POB	RAB	SAS	SIL	SKO	SLO	TIK	VAR
Balkan	—	1–1	2–1	1–1	0–0	0–1	0–1	2–6	0–4	0–3	2–1	0–1	1–0	1–0
Borec	6–0	—	1–2	2–1	2–1	2–0	0–3	2–0	0–0	0–2	3–0	1–1	0–0	3–2
Cementarnica 55	2–0	0–2	—	3–0	1–0	5–3	2–0	2–4	1–1	1–1	4–1	0–1	1–2	3–1
Makedonija	5–0	1–1	1–0	—	1–0	3–1	1–0	4–2	1–0	1–1	4–2	0–3	5–0	0–3
Osogovo	1–0	2–2	1–2	3–1	—	0–0	2–1	3–2	2–1	2–1	2–1	1–4	1–2	0–2
Pelister	0–0	3–1	2–1	4–2	1–0	—	2–2	1–1	3–2	0–2	1–1	0–5	3–3	1–2
Pobeda	2–0	3–0	4–1	2–1	4–1	5–0	—	2–1	5–0	2–0	6–0	2–0	2–1	1–0
Rabotnichki	2–0	0–0	2–4	2–2	3–2	3–1	1–0	—	2–1	0–2	3–2	0–1	1–1	0–1
Sasa	2–0	1–0	1–3	0–0	1–0	3–0	1–1	2–0	—	1–1	3–1	0–1	1–3	0–0
Sileks	7–1	1–1	1–0	5–3	4–0	4–0	1–0	0–0	3–2	—	6–0	2–0	3–1	4–4
Skopje	2–0	2–0	1–3	1–3	1–1	0–1	1–0	1–2	2–0	1–3	—	0–1	1–0	1–2
Sloga Jugomagnat	3–0	2–0	1–2	1–0	6–1	1–1	1–0	1–0	1–0	0–1	2–0	—	2–1	1–0
Tikvesh	2–1	3–1	2–0	1–1	2–0	0–0	0–1	3–0	2–0	0–4	4–0	0–0	—	1–2
Vardar	7–2	4–0	2–2	2–2	2–1	2–1	1–2	6–1	5–1	2–1	3–2	0–1	6–0	—

Source: RSSSF.org
Legend: Blue = home team win; Yellow = draw; Red = away team win.

== Top goalscorers ==
Rank	Player	Club	Goals
1	(Brazil) Rogério Oliveira	Pobeda	22
2	(North Macedonia) Vancho Trajchev	Vardar	14

Source: Top15goalscorers.blogspot.com

== See also ==
- 1998–99 Macedonian Football Cup
- 1998–99 Macedonian Second Football League
