= Bojan Mihajlović =

Bojan Mihajlović may refer to:

- Bojan Mihajlović (footballer, born 1973), Serbian football midfielder
- Bojan Mihajlović (footballer, born 1988), Bosnian-Herzegovinian football defender
