= Ivan Pejčić =

Serbian footballer

Personal information
- Full name: Ivan Pejčić
- Date of birth: 11 September 1982 (age 44)
- Place of birth: Niš, SFR Yugoslavia
- Height: 1.83 m (6 ft 0 in)
- Position: Forward

Senior career*
| Years | Team | Apps | (Gls) |
| 2000–2002 | Radnički Niš | | |
| 2002–2003 | Mladi Obilić | | |
| 2004–2008 | Rabotnički | 98 | (23) |
| 2008–2010 | Aarau | 37 | (1) |
| 2010 | EN Paralimni | 11 | (0) |
| 2011–2012 | Radnički Niš | 24 | (13) |
| 2012–2013 | Radnički Kragujevac | 9 | (0) |
| 2014–2015 | Radnički Niš | 40 | (6) |
| 2016 | Jagodina | 10 | (1) |
| 2017 | OFK Niš | | |
| 2018–2020 | Sinđelić Niš | | |
- * Club domestic league appearances and goals as of 8 July 2018

Ivan Pejčić (Serbian Cyrillic: Иван Пејчић; born 11 September 1982) is a Serbian retired footballer who played as a striker. He took Macedonian citizenship in 2006 to be able to play for the Macedonian national football team. In 2008, he won the Macedonian Championship and the Macedonian Cup with FK Rabotnički.

On 10 July 2008 he signed for FC Aarau of the Swiss Super League.

== Honours ==
- Macedonian First Football League: 2007–08
- Macedonian Football Cup: 2007–08
- Best foreign player in Prva Liga: 2005 and 2006
