= 1998–99 Macedonian Football Cup =

Tournament details
- Country: Macedonia
- Dates: 2 August 1998 – 22 May 1999
- Teams: 32

Final positions
- Champions: Vardar (4th title)
- Runners-up: Sloga Jugomagnat

The 1998–99 Macedonian Football Cup was the 7th season of Macedonia's football knockout competition. Vardar defended their title, having won their fourth title.

== Competition calendar ==
Round	Date(s)	Fixtures	Clubs	New entries
First Round	2 August 1998	16	32 → 16	32
Group stage	9, 23 September, 7 October, 11, 29 November 1998 & 28 February 1999	48	16 → 8	none
Quarter-finals	10, 17 March 1999	8	8 → 4	none
Semi-finals	7, 21 April 1999	4	4 → 2	none
Final	22 May 1999	1	2 → 1	none

== First round ==
Team 1	Score	Team 2
Jugohrom	0–3	Vardar

== Group stage ==
The most results are unknown.

=== Group 1 ===
Pobeda and Vardar were advanced to the quarterfinal, the other teams in group were Kumanovo and Sasa.

=== Group 4 ===
Sileks and Osogovo were advanced to the quarterfinal, the other teams in group were Pelister and Ilinden Skopje.

== Quarter-finals ==
The first legs were played on 10 March and second were played on 17 March 1999.

Team 1	Agg.	Team 2	1st leg	2nd leg
Cementarnica	2–3	Vardar	2–2	0–1
Pobeda	3–1	Makedonija G.P.	2–0	1–1
Osogovo	0–5	Sloga Jugomagnat	0–2	0–3
Rabotnichki Kometal	1–3	Sileks	1–0	0–3

== Semi-finals ==
The first legs were played on 7 April and the second were played on 21 April 1999.

Team 1	Agg.	Team 2	1st leg	2nd leg
Pobeda	5–5 (a)	Vardar	4–2	1–3
Sloga Jugomagnat	0–0 (3–1 p)	Sileks	0–0	0–0

== Final ==
22 May 1999
18:00 CEST

Sloga Jugomagnat	0–2	Vardar
	Report	Trajchev 66'; Shaqiri 90+2'

Gradski stadion, Skopje
Attendance: 14,000
Referee: Ljubomir Krstevski (Bitola)

== See also ==
- 1998–99 Macedonian First Football League
- 1998–99 Macedonian Second Football League
