= Beganović =

Beganović is a Bosnian surname, borne mostly by Bosniaks. People with the last name:

- Amar Beganović (born 1999), Bosnian footballer
- Aneja Beganovič (born 1997), Slovenian handballer
- Belmin Beganović (born 2004), Austrian footballer
- Dino Beganovic (born 2004), Swedish-Bosnian racing driver
- Dženis Beganović (born 1996), Bosnian footballer
- Elvedin Beganović (born 1971), Bosnian footballer
- Husein Beganović (born 1971), Macedonian footballer
- Sabina Began (born 1974), German actress of Bosnian descent
- Samid Beganović (1960–2009), Yugoslav and Serbian footballer
- Agan Beganović and Hasib Beganović, killed in the Cazin rebellion
