= Milošević (surname) =

- Pronunciation: [milɔ̌ːʃɛʋit͡ɕ]

Origin
- Meaning: Son of Miloš
- Region of origin: Former Yugoslavia

Milošević (Serbian Cyrillic: Милошевић, pronounced [milɔ̌ːʃɛʋit͡ɕ]) is a patronymic surname derived from the given name Miloš. It is predominantly worn by ethnic Serbs, and to a lesser degree Montenegrins and Croats.

Milošević is the tenth most frequent surname in Serbia.

Notable people with the surname include:

- Alexander Milošević, Swedish footballer
- Boki Milošević, Serbian clarinetist
- Deni Milošević, Bosnian footballer
- Dragomir Milošević, Bosnian Serb paramilitary leader
- Dušan Milošević, Serbian footballer
- Danny Milosevic, Australian footballer
- Goran Milošević, Serbian footballer
- Ivan Milošević (born 1984), Serbian footballer
- Katrina Milosevic (born 1976), Australian Actor
- Milenko Milošević, Bosnian-Serb footballer
- Miroslav Milošević (footballer, born 1975)
- Miroslav Milošević (footballer, born 1976)
- Miroslav Milošević (footballer, born 1985)
- Miroslav Milošević (footballer, born 1986)
- Miloš Milošević, Croatian swimmer of Serbian descent
- Nikola Milošević (politician) (1929–2007), Serbian writer, political philosopher, literary critic, and politician
- Nikola Milošević (computer scientist) (born 1986), Serbian computer scientist
- Nikola Milošević (footballer, born 1993), Serbian football midfielder
- Nikola Milošević (footballer, born 1996), Serbian footballer
- Nikola Milošević (water polo) (born 2001), Croatian water polo player
- Nikola Milošević (handballer) (born 1994), Serbian handball player for RK Borac Banja Luka
- Nikola Milošević (sambo), Serbian sambo fighter at the 2013 Summer Universiade
- Savo Milošević, Serbian footballer, ex-captain of nation team
- Selena Milošević, Croatian handball player
- Slađana Milošević, Serbian singer-songwriter, composer, record producer and writer
- Slobodan Milošević (1941–2006), Serbian politician, war criminal and President of FR Yugoslavia
- Sofija Milošević, Serbian fashion model
- Tamara Milosevic, German documentary filmmaker of Serbian descent
- Vlado Milošević, Bosnian-Serb composer

== See also ==
- Milović
