= Vladimir Sekulovski =

Macedonian footballer (born 1980)

Personal information
- Date of birth: October 7, 1980 (age 46)
- Place of birth: Tetovo, Macedonia
- Height: 1.84 m (6 ft 0 in)
- Position: Defender

Senior career*
Years	Team	Apps	(Gls)
1999–2005	Sloga Jugomagnat		
2005–2008	Vardar	83	(2)
2008–2010	Rabotnički	32+	(0+)
2011	Shkumbini	13	(0)
2011–2013	Teteks	41	(0)
2013–2015	Makedonija		
2015–	Osogovo		
- * Club domestic league appearances and goals as of June 30, 2013

Vladimir Sekulovski (born October 7, 1980, in Tetovo) is a Macedonian footballer who plays as a defender for Macedonian Third Football League club FK Osogovo.

== Club career ==
He previously played in the Albanian Superliga for Shkumbini Peqin. Internationally, he represented his country at under-18 level, and was an unused substitute for the senior team as they beat Liechtenstein 3–1 in a Euro 2004 qualifier.
