= Nedžad Verlašević =

Bosnian footballer (1955–2001)

Personal information
- Date of birth: 8 October 1955
- Place of birth: Bratunac, FPR Yugoslavia
- Date of death: 21 January 2001 (aged 45)
- Place of death: Tuzla, Bosnia and Herzegovina
- Height: 1.91 m (6 ft 3 in)
- Position: Defender

Youth career
- –1973: Bratstvo Bratunac

Senior career*
Years	Team	Apps	(Gls)
1973–1974	Bratstvo Bratunac		
1975–1983	Sloboda Tuzla	215	(9)
1983	Golden Bay Earthquakes	5	(0)
1983–1985	Sloboda Tuzla	60	(1)
1985–1986	Željezničar	16	(0)
1987–1990	Sloboda Tuzla	75	(4)

International career
- Yugoslavia U21

Managerial career
- 1994–1996: Sloga Jugomagnat
- 1996–1998: Sloboda Tuzla
- 1999: Željezničar
- 1999: Gorica
- 2000: Jedinstvo Bihać
Medal record
Representing Yugoslavia
Gold medal – first place	UEFA U-21 Euro	1978
- * Club domestic league appearances and goals

Nedžad "Smajo" Verlašević (8 October 1955 – 21 January 2001) was a Bosnian football manager and player.

== Club career ==
Verlašević played a club record of 350 league matches for hometown club Sloboda Tuzla. He also spent a season at Željezničar.

== Death ==
Verlašević died of a heart attack in 2001, only 45 years of age.

== Honours ==
=== Player ===
Yugoslavia Youth

- UEFA European Under-21 Championship: 1978

=== Manager ===
Sloga Jugomagnat

- Macedonian Cup: 1995–96

Sloboda Tuzla

- Bosnian Cup runner-up: 1997–98
