= Blagoja Milevski =

Macedonian footballer and manager

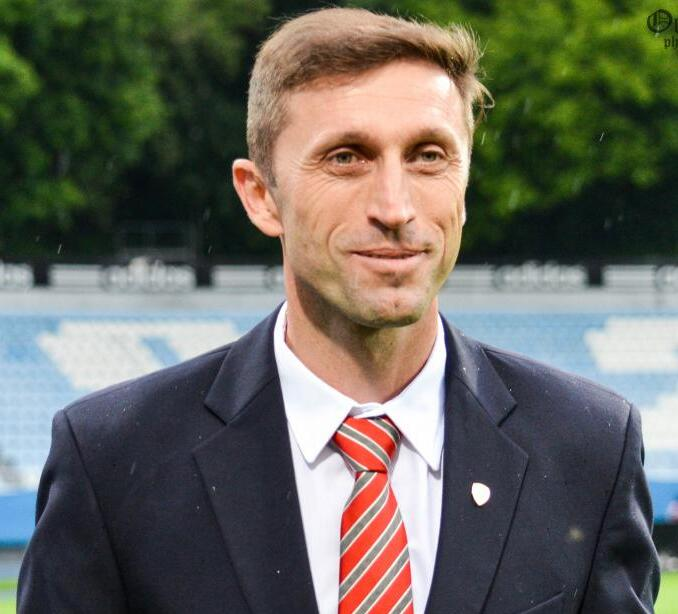
- Milevski in 2016 with Macedonia U21

Personal information
- Full name: Blagoja Milevski; Благоја Милевски
- Date of birth: 25 March 1971 (age 55)
- Place of birth: Skopje, SR Macedonia, Yugoslavia
- Height: 1.88 m (6 ft 2 in)
- Position: Central defender

Senior career*
Years	Team	Apps	(Gls)
1990–1991	Red Star Belgrade	0	(0)
1991–1992	Iraklis		
1992–1993	Trikala		
1993–1995	Maribor	52	(2)
1995–1997	Pobeda		
1997–1998	Paniliakos	8	(0)
1998–2000	Makedonija	25	(1)
2000–2001	Pobeda	28	(0)
2001–2004	Ashdod	80	(3)
2004–2007	Cementarnica		
2007–2009	Makedonija	42	(3)
2010	Vardar	10	(0)

International career
1998	Macedonia	1	(0)

Managerial career
- 2011–2012: Vardar (assistant)
- 2012: Vardar
- 2013–2014: Vardar
- 2014–2018: Macedonia U21
- 2018: Ashdod
- 2019–2021: North Macedonia U21
- 2021–2025: North Macedonia
- * Club domestic league appearances and goals

Blagoja "Bobi" Milevski(Macedonian: Благоја Боби Милевски-Кичеец); born 25 March 1971) is a Macedonian football manager and former player and former manager of the national team North Macedonia national football team

== Club career ==
During his playing career he played with Red Star Belgrade, Iraklis, Trikala, Maribor, Pobeda, Paniliakos, Makedonija GjP, Ashdod, Cementarnica 55 and Vardar.

== International career ==
He played one match for the Macedonian national team in September 1998 against Egypt.

== Managerial career ==
After retiring, he became a manager. While coaching Vardar, he won the award attributed by the Football Federation of Macedonia as the best coach in 2013. On 18 September 2014, he was named coach of the Macedonian U21 team. On 11 May 2018 Milevski was signed to the Israeli Premier League club, F.C. Ashdod.

After his return to the Macedonian U21 side, Milevski became the head coach of the senior Macedonian national team in September 2021.His contract expired 30 November 2025.

== Honours and awards ==
As player:

- NK Maribor
  - Slovenian League:
    - Runner-up: 1994–95
  - Slovenian Cup:
    - Winner: 1993–94
- FK Pobeda
  - Macedonian First League:
    - Runner-up: 1996–97
- F.C. Ashdod
  - Toto Cup:
    - Runner-up: 2001-02
- FK Cementarnica 55
  - Macedonian Second League:
    - Runner-up: 2006–07
- FK Makedonija GjP
  - Macedonian First League:
    - Winner: 2008–09
  - Macedonian Cup:
    - Runner-up: 2008–09

As coach:

- FK Vardar
  - Macedonian First League:
    - Winner: 2012–13
  - Macedonian Super Cup:
    - Winner: 2013

== Managerial statistics ==
As of match played 18 November 2025

Team	From	To	Record				
Team	From	To	G	W	D	L	Win %
North Macedonia	September 2021	November 2025	46	17	14	15	36.96
Total			46	17	14	15	36.96

== See also ==
- NK Maribor players
