= Bojan Mihajlović (footballer, born 1973) =

Serbian footballer

Personal information
- Full name: Bojan Mihajlović
- Date of birth: 16 December 1973 (age 52)
- Place of birth: SFR Yugoslavia
- Height: 1.78 m (5 ft 10 in)
- Position: Defensive midfielder

Senior career*
Years	Team	Apps	(Gls)
- Dubočica
- OFK Beograd
- Radnički Niš
2001–2003	Belasica	29	(0)
2003–2008	Rabotnički	97	(3)
2008–2011	Metalurg Skopje	31	(1)
- * Club domestic league appearances and goals

Bojan Mihajlović (Serbian Cyrillic: Бојан Михајловић; born 16 December 1973) is a Serbian retired footballer who played as a midfielder.

His previous clubs include FK Dubočica, OFK Beograd, FK Radnički Niš, FK Belasica, FK Rabotnički and FK Metalurg Skopje.

== Honours ==
Rabotnički

- Macedonian First Football League: 2004–05, 2005–06, 2007-08
- Macedonian Football Cup: 2007–08

Metalurg Skopje

- Macedonian Cup: 2010–11
