= Goran Hristovski =

Macedonian footballer

Personal information
- Full name: Goran Hristovski; Горан Христовски
- Date of birth: 24 January 1976 (age 50)
- Place of birth: SR Macedonia, SFR Yugoslavia
- Position: Defender

Senior career*
Years	Team	Apps	(Gls)
1999–2006	Cementarnica	161	(11)
2006–2007	Milano Kumanovo		
2007–	Cementarnica	23	(0)

International career^{‡}
2003	Macedonia	2	(0)
- * Club domestic league appearances and goals as of 31 July 2008 ‡ National team caps and goals as of 31 July 2008

Goran Hristovski (born 24 January 1976) is a Macedonian retired football defender, who last played for FK Cementarnica 55 in the Macedonian Second League.

== International career ==
He made his senior debut for Macedonia in a February 2003 friendly match against Croatia and has earned a total of 2 caps, scoring no goals. His second and final international was another friendly 5 days later against Poland.

== External sources ==
- Goran Hristovski at National-Football-Teams.com
