= Nebi Mustafi =

Macedonian footballer

Personal information
- Full name: Nebi Mustafi; Неби Мустафи
- Date of birth: 21 August 1976 (age 50)
- Place of birth: Tetovo, SR Macedonia, SFR Yugoslavia (now North Macedonia)
- Height: 1.81 m (5 ft 11 1/2 in)
- Position: Midfielder

Youth career
- Shkëndija

Senior career*
Years	Team	Apps	(Gls)
1996–1997	Shkëndija		
1997–2004	Sloga Jugomagnat	87	(15)
2004–2005	Levadiakos	8	(0)
2005–2006	Neuchâtel Xamax	11	(0)
2006	Haka	12	(2)
2007–2010	MyPa	52	(2)
2010–2012	Shkëndija	60	(13)
2012–2013	Drita	27	(4)
2013–2014	Shkëndija	18	(1)

International career^{‡}
2001–2005	Macedonia	7	(0)
- * Club domestic league appearances and goals as of 25 July 2011 ‡ National team caps and goals as of 15 June 2009

Nebi Mustafi (Macedonian: Неби Мустафи), born 21 August 1976, in Shemsovë, Tetovo, is an Albanian-Macedonian retired footballer who last played in midfield for FK Shkëndija 79. He has also played for the Republic of Macedonia national football team.

== Clubs ==
- 1996–1998 : KF Shkëndija
- 1998–2004 : FK Sloga Jugomagnat
- 2004–2005 : Levadiakos
- 2005–2006 : Neuchâtel Xamax
- 2006–2007 : Haka
- 2007–2010 : MyPa
- 2010–2012 : KF Shkëndija
- 2012–2013 : FK Drita
- 2013- : KF Shkëndija

== International career ==
He made his senior debut for Macedonia in an August 2001 friendly match against Bulgaria and has earned a total of 7 caps, scoring no goals. His final international was a September 2005 FIFA World Cup qualification match away against Finland.

== Personal life ==
His brother Nuri Mustafi is currently also playing for FK Shkëndija.

== Honours ==
- Macedonian Prva Liga: 1998–99, 1999–00, 2000–01, 2010–11
- Macedonian Cup: 2000, 2004
- Macedonian Super Cup: 2011
