= Zvonimir Stanković =

Serbian footballer

Personal information
- Full name: Zvonimir Stanković
- Date of birth: 22 November 1983 (age 42)
- Place of birth: Leskovac, SFR Yugoslavia
- Height: 1.82 m (5 ft 11 1/2 in)
- Position: Defender

Senior career*
Years	Team	Apps	(Gls)
2001–2002	Dubočica	24	(0)
2002–2003	→ Teleoptik (loan)		
2003	→ Proleter Zrenjanin (loan)	10	(0)
2004	→ OFK Niš (loan)	12	(1)
2004–2005	Železnik	2	(0)
2005–2006	Bregalnica Štip	14	(1)
2006–2009	Renova	73	(1)
2009–2010	Lokomotiv Sofia	0	(0)
2011	Rabotnički	14	(0)
2011–2012	BSK Borča	5	(0)
2012	Dubočica	12	(0)
2013	Moravac Mrštane	8	(0)
2013–2014	Dinamo Vranje		
2015–2016	Bregalnica Štip	33	(0)
2020–2022	Dubočica	16	(0)
- * Club domestic league appearances and goals as of 1 February 2016

Zvonimir Stanković (Serbian Cyrillic: Звонимир Станковић; born 22 November 1983) is a Serbian retired footballer.

== Career ==
After spending the first years of his career in his home country with second and third level clubs FK Dubočica, FK Teleoptik, FK Proleter Zrenjanin and OFK Niš, he made his debut in the First League of Serbia and Montenegro in the 2004–05 season with FK Železnik. In the following season Stanković relocated to Macedonia in June 2005, signing a contract with FK Bregalnica Štip. From 2006 to 2009 he was a part of KF Renova, with whom earned 4 appearances, playing in the Intertoto Cup in 2008. On 16 July 2009, Bulgarian side PFC Lokomotiv Sofia signed Stanković to a two-year deal. After playing a season and a half in Bulgarian A PFG, he returned to the Macedonian First League this time to play with FK Rabotnički where he played the second half of the 2010–11 season. In summer 2011 he returned to Serbia signing with Serbian SuperLiga club FK BSK Borča. In the following seasons he played with 2 clubs in the Serbian third league, FK Dubočica and FK Moravac Mrštane.
