= FK Proleter Makedonski Brod =

Proleter Makedonski Brod
- Full name: Fudbalski klub Proleter Makedonski Brod
- Founded: 1937; 88 years ago

FK Proleter Makedonski Brod (Macedonian: ФК Пролетер Македонски Брод) is a football club from Makedonski Brod, North Macedonia. They was recently played in the Macedonian Third League.

== History ==
The club was founded in 1937.
