= Nuri Mustafi =

Macedonian footballer

Personal information
- Full name: Nuri Mustafi
- Date of birth: 16 March 1983 (age 43)
- Place of birth: SFR Yugoslavia
- Height: 1.85 m (6 ft 1 in)
- Position: Midfielder

Youth career
- Shkëndija

Senior career*
Years	Team	Apps	(Gls)
2004–2006	Shkëndija	85	(7)
2007	PoPa	23	(7)
2008–2013	GIF Sundsvall	79	(4)
2013–2014	Ljungskile	24	(1)
2014	Shkëndija	11	(0)
2014–2016	Brønshøj	38	(2)
- * Club domestic league appearances and goals

Nuri Mustafi (born 16 March 1983) is a Macedonian footballer of Albanian descent who last played for Danish 1st Division side Brønshøj BK as a midfielder.

== Club career ==
He has previously played for GIF Sundsvall and Ljungskile SK in Sweden and for FC PoPa in Finland.

== Personal life ==
Mustafi's brother Nebi Mustafi is a Macedonian international footballer.
