= Nikolce Klečkarovski =

Macedonian footballer

Personal information
- Full name: Nikolce Klečkarovski
- Date of birth: May 17, 1983 (age 43)
- Place of birth: Struga, SFR Yugoslavia
- Height: 1.90 m (6 ft 3 in)
- Position: Striker

Senior career*
Years	Team	Apps	(Gls)
2007–2009	Turnovo		
2009–2010	Makedonija	12	(2)
2010–2011	Metalurg	16	(2)
2011	Teteks	10	(5)
2011–2012	Teteks	12	(4)
2012	SHB Đà Nẵng	19	(4)
2013	Pahang	4	
2014–2016	Mladost CD		
- * Club domestic league appearances and goals

Nikolce Klečkarovski (born 17 May 1983) is a Macedonian football player who previously plays as a striker at Pahang FA. He is currently a free agent.

== Club career ==
The 29-year-old centre forward, born in Struga, moved to SHB Đà Nẵng in January 2012 and scored four goals in the past season of the Vietnamese V-League. Before his move to Asia he briefly played for Makedonija Gjorche Petrov in the Macedonian Second League, though in the past he played for several teams from the Macedonian First League.

Klečkarovski played two games in the UEFA Champions League with FK Makedonija.
