= Jovica Trajčev =

Macedonian footballer

Personal information
- Full name: Jovica Trajčev; Јовица Трајчев
- Date of birth: 9 January 1981 (age 45)
- Place of birth: Radovis, Macedonia
- Height: 1.87 m (6 ft 1 1/2 in)
- Position: Midfielder

Youth career
- 1998–1999: FK Sileks

Senior career*
Years	Team	Apps	(Gls)
1999–2002	Sileks	47	(2)
2002–2005	Vardar	51	(0)
2005	AA Gent	3	(0)
2006	Deinze	10	(1)
2008	Bashkimi	11	(1)
2008	Milano Kumanovo	16	(0)
2009	Rabotnički	6	(0)
2009–2011	Metalurg Skopje	12	(0)
2012–2016	Bregalnica Štip	23+	(1+)
2016–2017	Bregalnica Delčevo		

International career
2001–2002	Macedonia	4	(0)
- * Club domestic league appearances and goals

Jovica Trajčev (Macedonian: Јовица Трајчев, pronounced [ˈjɔvit͡sa ˈtrajt͡ʃɛv]; born 9 January 1981) is a Macedonian retired football player, who last played as a central midfielder for Bregalnica Delčevo.

== Club career ==
In his career he played for Sileks Kratovo, Vardar Skopje and Milano Kumanovo. In May 2005, he signed up with Belgian top-tier side AA Gent. In February 2008, he returned from Belgium to join Bashkimi.

== International career ==
He made his senior debut for Macedonia in a December 2001 friendly match against Oman and has earned a total of 4 caps, scoring no goals. His final international was a January 2002 Bahrain Tournament match against Finland.
