= FK Sloga Jugomagnat =

- Full name: Fudbalski Klub Sloga Jugomagnat
- Nickname: Гулаби (Pigeons)
- Founded: 1927
- Dissolved: 2009
- Ground: Čair Stadium
- Capacity: 6,000
- Final season 2008–09: 2nd (Promoted to First League)
Home colours	Away colours

FK Sloga Jugomagnat (Macedonian: ФК Слога Југомагнат) was a football club that played in Skopje, North Macedonia.

== History ==
=== Zafer's era (1927–1945) ===
The club was established in 1927 under the name FK Zafer by the football enthusiasts coming from Skopje's neighborhood Livadishta meaning Meadow. Like other clubs from Skopje at that time, Zafer also played friendly matches with other clubs from the city.

Shortly after, Zafer begun competing in the Skopje League (city league), and then in the regional league of the Skoplje Football Subassociation, a league made of the best clubs coming from the Southern part of the Vardar Duchy, SCS. The club from its beginning was the place where players from different minorities could gather, mostly Albanian and Torbesh players, but not limited to. There were also numerous Bosnian, Roma and Macedonian players which played in the club.

=== Sloga's era (1945–1989) ===
At the end of WWII, the clubs name was changed to Sloga (which means 'United' in Macedonian). In that time the club was financed by local citizens and people (fans) gathered money to pay for players and staff salaries. Club in that time played in regional Macedonian Republic League, ranked as a 2nd and 3 rd league in the Yugoslav league system. The team always had a big army of fans who followed it, no matter if they played home or away.

=== Sloga Jugomagnat's era (1989–2009) ===
In 1989, major improvement in all levels occurred with the arrival of Rafet Muminović and his company, “Jugomagnat” as sponsors of the club. At that time Sloga played in the Macedonian Second League (ranked as a 5th league in Yugoslavia). That year club changed its name to Sloga Jugomagnat and was promoted to higher level with plan to further promote to the Third Federal League in the following season. However, that year SFR Yugoslavia broke-up and Macedonia became an independent country. Sloga Jugomagnat along with 17 other best teams from Macedonia was directly promoted to the Macedonian First League, finishing in 6th place in its inaugural season. In second season they achieved 8th place and the following season the club made it to 3rd place.

Champion striker Blagoja Ardjaliev was the top goal scorer in 1996

Later, Sloga achieved few runners up positions and won the championship three times. By 2015, Sloga is still the club holding the record of playing the most Macedonian Cup finals, eight in total, having it won in 3 occasions. By 2015, Sloga is the second most successful club in the country with 3 championships and 3 cup titles with keeping a record win in all time Cup finals, against Pobeda Prilep with result of 6:0. During the 1990s Sloga was very popular in whole country. In 1996, after winning the first cup, more than 1,000 youngsters from Skopje and other cities were registered in the youth school. Many of them later played in different clubs and also in other countries.

In 2005, after financial problems of the main sponsor, the club was relegated to the Second League where stayed four years and in the season 2008–09, with the help of its fans, achieved again promotion to the First League. But next season, Sloga Jugomagnat together with Makedonija Gjorče Petrov started boycotting all competitions organized by the Football Federation of Macedonia as a protest because of the re-election of the president Haralampie Hadži-Risteski. Both teams didn't appear on the matches in the rounds 14 and 15 and according to the regulations by FFM, they have been suspended and expelled from competing in the Macedonian First League. In the beginning, Vardar Skopje, Pelister Bitola, Rabotnički Skopje, Metalurg Skopje, Sileks Kratovo, were also active in this boycott, however later they stopped it, and continued to play except Sloga Jugomagnat and Makedonija Gjorče Petrov.

In 2012, the club was merged with FC Albarsa to form KF Shkupi. However, they are not legally considered to be successors to the original Sloga Jugomagnat and the two clubs' track records and honours are kept separate by the Football Federation of Macedonia.

== Honours ==
- (North Macedonia) Macedonian First League:
  - Winners (3): 1998–99, 1999–2000, 2000–01
  - Runners-up (2): 1995–96, 1997–98
- (North Macedonia) Macedonian Second League:
  - Runners-up (1): 2008–09
- (North Macedonia) Macedonian Football Cup:
  - Winners (3): 1995–96, 1999–2000, 2003–04
  - Runners-up (5): 1996–97, 1997–98, 1998–99, 2000–01, 2002–03

== Seasons ==
Season	League									Cup	European competitions	
Season	Division	P	W	D	L	F	A	Pts	Pos	Cup	European competitions	
1992–93	1. MFL	34	13	8	13	46	37	34	6th			
1993–94	1. MFL	30	7	13	10	29	30	27	8th			
1994–95	1. MFL	30	17	7	6	43	26	58	3rd			
1995–96	1. MFL	28	18	4	6	48	19	58	2nd	W		
1996–97	1. MFL	26	13	7	6	42	25	46	3rd	RU	Cup Winners' Cup	QR
1997–98	1. MFL	25	12	7	6	25	16	43	2nd	RU	Cup Winners' Cup	QR
1998–99	1. MFL	26	19	3	4	41	12	60	1st	RU	UEFA Cup	QR1
1999–00	1. MFL	26	18	7	1	55	13	61	1st	W	Champions League	QR2
2000–01	1. MFL	26	20	3	3	61	15	63	1st	RU	Champions League	QR1
2001–02	1. MFL	20	6	5	9	18	25	23	5th	SF	Champions League	QR2
2002–03	1. MFL	33	15	6	12	62	50	51	5th	RU		
2003–04	1. MFL	33	17	6	10	69	36	57	5th	W		
2004–05	1. MFL	33	5	2	16	37	80	17	11th ↓	QF	UEFA Cup	QR1
2005–06	2. MFL	30	11	7	12	35	39	40	5th	R1		
2006–07	2. MFL	33	12	7	14	48	46	43	6th	PR		
2007–08	2. MFL	32	13	5	14	36	34	44	8th	PR		
2008–09	2. MFL	29	17	8	4	31	12	59	2nd ↑	R1		
2009–10	1. MFL	FFM expelled Sloga Jugomagnat from the league							↓	R1		

== Sloga in Europe ==
Season	Competition	Round	Opponent	Home	Away	Aggregate
1996–97	UEFA Cup Winners' Cup	QR	(Hungary) Honvéd	0–1	0–1	0–2
1997–98	UEFA Cup Winners' Cup	QR	(Croatia) Zagreb	1–2	0–2	1–4
1998–99	UEFA Cup	QR1	(Romania) Oțelul Galați	1–1	0–3	0–1
1999–00	UEFA Champions League	QR1	(Azerbaijan) Kapaz	1–0	1–2	2–2 (a)
1999–00	UEFA Champions League	QR2	(Denmark) Brøndby	0–1	0–1	0–2
2000–01	UEFA Champions League	QR1	(Republic of Ireland) Shelbourne	0–1	1–1	1–2
2001–02	UEFA Champions League	QR1	(Lithuania) FBK Kaunas	0–0	1–1	1–1 (a)
2001–02	UEFA Champions League	QR2	(Romania) Steaua București	1–2	0–3	1–5
2004–05	UEFA Cup	QR1	(Cyprus) Omonia	1–4	0–4	1–8

== Historical list of coaches ==
- (North Macedonia) Abdül Melik Kurtiş
- (Bosnia and Herzegovina) Nedžad Verlašević (1994 - 1996)
- (Serbia) Zlatko Krmpotić (1997 - 1998)
- (North Macedonia) Gjore Jovanovski (1999 - 2001)
- (North Macedonia) Ekrem Maglajlija (2001)
- (North Macedonia) Gjore Jovanovski (2001 - 2002)
- (North Macedonia) Nedžat Šabani (2002)
- (North Macedonia) Adnan Zekir (2003 - Oct 2004)
- (North Macedonia) Blagoja Kitanovski (31 Oct 2004 - Apr 2005)
- (North Macedonia) Husein Beganović (10 Apr 2005 -)
- (Bosnia and Herzegovina) Šener Bajramović (2005 - 2006)
- (North Macedonia) Mensur Nexhipi (2008 - Oct 2009)
- (North Macedonia) Nedžat Šabani (27 Oct 2009 -)
