= Miroslav Milošević (footballer, born 1975) =

Serbian footballer

Personal information
- Full name: Miroslav Milošević
- Date of birth: 2 July 1975 (age 51)
- Place of birth: Pančevo, SFR Yugoslavia
- Height: 1.74 m (5 ft 9 in)
- Position: Midfielder

Senior career*
Years	Team	Apps	(Gls)
1993–1994	Napredak Kruševac	5	(0)
1994–1995	Trayal Kruševac		
1995–1996	Napredak Kruševac	10	(0)
1996–1997	Milicionar	8	(0)
1997–2000	Trayal Kruševac	61	(2)
2000	Pelister	5	(0)
2000–2004	Napredak Kruševac	70	(2)
2004–2005	Hajduk Beograd	21	(1)
2005–2007	Makedonija GP	51	(16)
2008	Austria Lustenau	3	(3)
2008	Rabotnički	6	(3)
2009-2010	Turnovo	32	(5)
2010	FK Kovačevac	10	(5)
- * Club domestic league appearances and goals

Miroslav Milošević (Serbian Cyrillic: Мирослав Милошевић; born 2 July 1975) is a Serbian retired footballer.
