= Predrag Živadinović =

Serbian association football player

Personal information
- Full name: Predrag Živadinović
- Date of birth: 7 July 1983 (age 43)
- Place of birth: Kragujevac, SFR Yugoslavia
- Height: 1.85 m (6 ft 1 in)
- Position: Striker

Senior career*
Years	Team	Apps	(Gls)
2001–2005	Erdoglija Kragujevac		
2005–2007	Radnički Kragujevac	43	(12)
2007–2008	Bashkimi	30	(10)
2008–2010	BSK Borča	39	(7)
2010–2012	Radnički Kragujevac	37	(10)
2012–2013	Metalac Gornji Milanovac	33	(10)
2013–2016	Mladost Lučani	75	(20)
2016–2017	Šumadija 1903		
2017–2019	Sušica Kragujevac		
- * Club domestic league appearances and goals as of 12 May 2016

Predrag Živadinović (Serbian Cyrillic: Предраг Живадиновић; born 7 July 1983) is a Serbian retired football striker.

== Honours ==
Mladost Lučani

- Serbian First League: 2013–14
