= FK Lozar =

ФК Лозар FK Lozar
- Full name: Fudbalski klub Lozar Demir Kapija
- Founded: 2001
- Dissolved: 2009
- Ground: Gradski Stadion Demir Kapija
- Capacity: 500
Home colours	Away colours

FK Lozar (Macedonian: ФК Лозар) was a football club based in the city of Demir Kapija, Republic of Macedonia.

== History ==
The club was founded in 2001 and was dissolved in 2009.

At one time the club was a member of Macedonian Second League to 2006, when was a merged with FK Vardar Negotino.
