= Goce Toleski =

Macedonian footballer (born 1977)

Personal information
- Date of birth: 5 May 1977 (age 49)
- Place of birth: Ohrid, SR Macedonia, SFR Yugoslavia
- Height: 1.76 m (5 ft 9 in)
- Position: Striker

Senior career*
Years	Team	Apps	(Gls)
1999–2000	Tikvesh	9	(1)
2000–2003	Napredok	77	(21)
2004–2006	Rabotnički	47	(12)
2006	Renova	32	(23)
2007	Wacker Burghausen	13	(3)
2007	SIAD Most	13	(8)
2008	Slavia Prague	20	(6)
2009	Sigma Olomouc	9	(0)
2010	Renova	9	(1)
2010–2011	Mladá Boleslav	6	(1)
2011–2012	Ohrid 2004	0	(0)

International career
2002–2007	Macedonia	18	(1)
- * Club domestic league appearances and goals

Goce Toleski (Macedonian: Гоце Толески, born 5 May 1977) is a Macedonian former professional footballer who played as a striker

== Club career ==
=== Macedonia ===
Toleski signed for FK Rabotnički in January 2004.

In summer 2006, Toleski left for FK Renova.

=== Germany ===
Toleski moved to Wacker Burghausen of the 2. Bundesliga. But the club relegated after a poor second half season.

=== Czech Republic ===
Toleski signed for Slavia Prague on a two-year contract in December 2007. He won the 2007–08 Best foreigner player in the league.

== International career ==
Toleski made his senior debut for Macedonia in an April 2002 friendly match against Finland and has earned a total of 18 caps, scoring 1 goal. After a three-year hiatus, he was recalled to the squad in September 2007, played both European Championship qualification matches against Russia and Estonia. The latter was his final international.
