= Vančo Trajčev =

Macedonian footballer

Personal information
- Full name: Ivan Trajčev; Ванчо Трајчов
- Date of birth: 5 July 1975 (age 51)
- Place of birth: Probištip, SR Macedonia, SFR Yugoslavia
- Height: 1.83 m (6 ft 0 in)
- Position: Central midfielder

Senior career*
| Years | Team | Apps | (Gls) |
| 1995–2000 | Vardar | | |
| 2000–2002 | Ethnikos Achna | 44 | (9) |
| 2002–2003 | AEK Larnaca | 25 | (3) |
| 2003–2004 | Sileks | 29 | (5) |
| 2004–2005 | Ethnikos Achna | 22 | (6) |
| 2005–2007 | Rabotnički Kometal | 55 | (18) |
| 2007–2009 | Renova | 47 | (3) |
| 2009–2010 | Sileks | 25 | (2) |
| 2010–2012 | Bregalnica Štip | 39 | (3) |

International career^{‡}
| 1998–2005 | Macedonia | 7 | (0) |
- * Club domestic league appearances and goals as of 17 July 2009 ‡ National team caps and goals as of 24 January 2010

Ivan "Vančo" Trajčev (born 5 July 1975) is a retired footballer from the Republic of Macedonia which was lastly played for FK Bregalnica Stip.

== International career ==
He made his senior debut for Macedonia in a September 1998 friendly match against Egypt and has earned a total of 7 caps, scoring no goals. His final international was a November 2005 friendly against Paraguay.

== External sources ==
- Vančo Trajčev at National-Football-Teams.com
- "Transfer to FK Bregalnica Stip". www.vest.com.mk. Archived from the original on 28 September 2011.
