= Husein Beganović =

Macedonian footballer

Personal information
- Date of birth: 16 June 1971 (age 55)
- Place of birth: SFR Yugoslavia
- Height: 1.89 m (6 ft 2 in)
- Position: Defender

Senior career*
Years	Team	Apps	(Gls)
–1997	Sloga Jugomagnat		
1998	RWDM	15	(0)
1999–2000	FC HIT	37	(1)
2001	Belasica	11	(0)
2001–2005	Sloga Jugomagnat	73	(3)

International career
1996–2001	Macedonia	4	(0)

Managerial career
- 2005: Sloga Jugomagnat
- * Club domestic league appearances and goals

Husein Beganović (Macedonian: Хусеин Бегановиќ; born 16 June 1971) is a Macedonian former professional footballer, who played as defender.

== International career ==
Beganović made his senior debut for Macedonia in an October 1996 FIFA World Cup qualification match against Ireland and earned a total of four caps. His final international was a November 2001 friendly match against Hungary.

== External sources ==
- Husein Beganović at National-Football-Teams.com
