= Blessing Chinedu =

Nigerian footballer

Blessing
Personal information
- Full name: Blessing Anyanwu Chinedu
- Date of birth: November 22, 1976 (age 49)
- Place of birth: Enyimba, Nigeria
- Height: 1.92 m (6 ft 3 1/2 in)
- Position: Central defender

Senior career*
Years	Team	Apps	(Gls)
1993–1997	Enyimba		
1997–2000	Iwuanyanwu Nationale		
2000–2001	Vardar Skopje		
2001–2003	Cementarnica 55		
2003–2005	Vardar Skopje		
2005–2006	KAA Gent	15	(0)
2006–2007	Lierse	8	(0)

International career
1993	Nigeria U-17		
- * Club domestic league appearances and goals

Blessing Anyanwu Chinedu (born November 22, 1976, in Enyimba) is a retired Nigerian football defender.

== Career ==
In his early career he played in Nigeria with Enyimba International F.C. and Iwuanyanwu Nationale (former name of Heartland FC). In 2000, he moved to Macedonia where he signed for the traditionally strongest club FK Vardar. Between 2001 and 2003 he played with another Macedonian First League club, FK Cementarnica 55 before returning to Vardar. In 2005, he moved to Belgium signing with Belgian Pro League club K.A.A. Gent. After one season he moved to another Belgian club, Lierse S.K.

== National team ==
Chinedu was part of Nigerian under-17 squad at the 1993 FIFA U-17 World Championship.
