= Sušica, Novo Selo =

Sušica Сушица
- Village
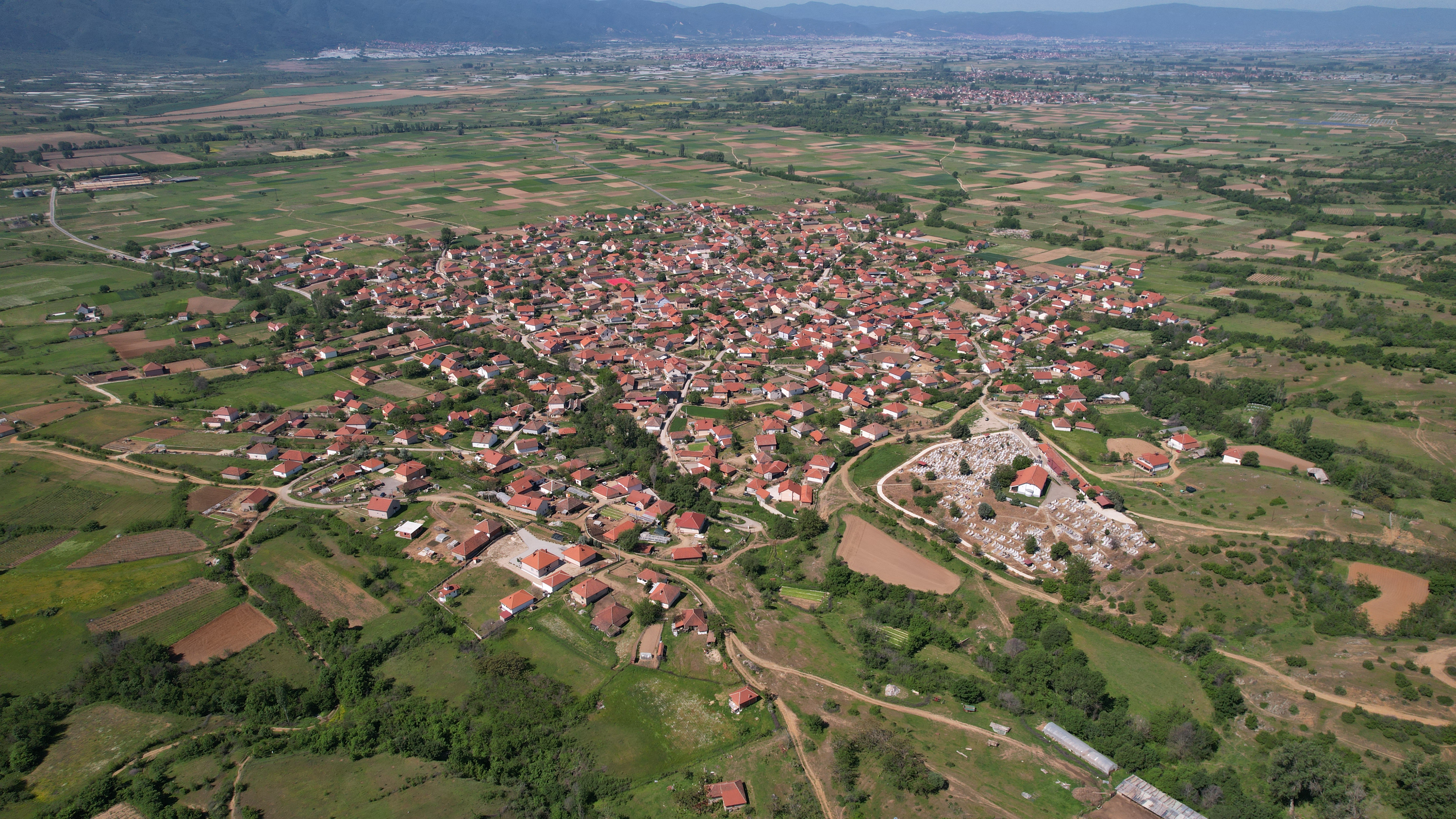
- Air view of the village

- Location within North Macedonia
- Coordinates: 41.438519°N 22.837553°E
- Country: North Macedonia
- Region: Southeastern
- Municipality: Novo Selo

Population (2021)
  - Total: 936
- Time zone: UTC+1 (CET)
  - Summer (DST): UTC+2 (CEST)
- Website: .

Sušica (Macedonian: Сушица) is a village in the municipality of Novo Selo, North Macedonia.

== Demographics ==
According to the 2002 census, the village had a total of 1,811 inhabitants. Ethnic groups in the village include:

- Macedonians 1,808
- Serbs 2
- Others 1

As of 2021, the village of Sushica has 936 inhabitants and the ethnic composition was the following:

- Macedonians – 848
- Albanians – 1
- Person without Data - 87

== Sports ==
Local football club FK Nov Milenium ceased to exist in 2008.
