= KF Milano Kumanovë =

- Full name: Fudbalski Klub Milano Kumanovo (in Macedonian)
- Nickname: Seferi
- Founded: 1990; 35 years ago
- Ground: Milano Arena
- Capacity: 3,500
- Chairman: Qenan Ahmeti
- League: OFS Kumanovo First Division
- 2018–19: OFS Kumanovo First Division, 10th
Home colours	Away colours

KF Milano Kumanovë (Macedonian: ФК Милано) is a football club based in Kumanovo, North Macedonia. They are currently competing in the OFS Kumanovo league.

== History ==
The club was founded in 1990. They were promoted to the Macedonian First League in 2007 and were runners-up in the first two seasons. In 2010, the club finished ninth and lost a relegation play-off against Bregalnica Štip to relegate them to the Macedonian Second League, but due to financial problems Milano was relegated to the Macedonian Third League.

== Season-by-season record ==
A season-by-season record of FK Milano Kumanovo league performances:

Season	League									Cup	European competitions	
Season	Division	P	W	D	L	F	A	Pts	Pos	Cup	European competitions	
2006–07	2. MFL	33	21	6	6	74	31	69	1st ↑	SF		
2007–08	1. MFL	33	21	3	9	74	35	66	2nd	RU		
2008–09	1. MFL	30	17	4	9	48	35	55	2nd	SF	UEFA Cup	QR1
2009–10	1. MFL	26	1	3	22	14	81	6	9th ↓↓	R1	Europa League	QR2

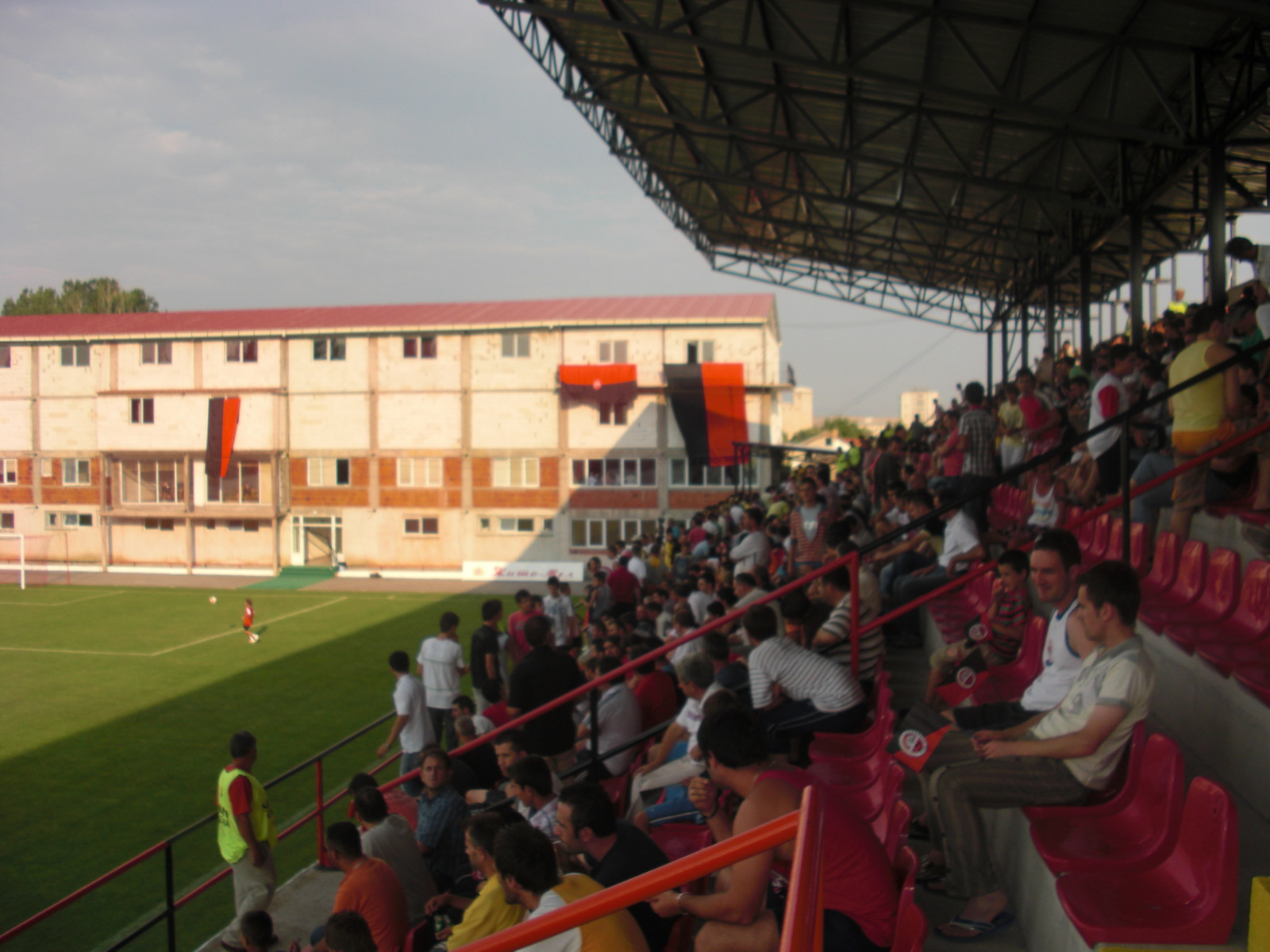
Milano Arena, home stadium of the club

== Honours ==
- (North Macedonia) Macedonian First League
  - Runners-up (2): 2007–08, 2008–09
- (North Macedonia) Macedonian Football Cup
  - Runners-up (1): 2007–08
- (North Macedonia) Macedonian Second League
  - Winners (1): 2006–07

== Milano in Europe ==
- Q = qualifier

Season	Competition	Round		Club	Score
2008/09	UEFA Cup	Q1	(Cyprus)	AC Omonia	0–2, 1–2
2009/10	UEFA Europa League	Q2	(Croatia)	NK Slaven Belupo	0–4, 2–8

== Historical list of coaches ==
- (North Macedonia) Blagoja Kitanovski (2006)
- (Kosovo) Bylbyl Sokoli (2007)
- (North Macedonia) Gjore Jovanovski (10 Oct 2007 – Jun 2008)
- (Kosovo) Bylbyl Sokoli (1 Jul 2008 – 10 Jan 2009)
- (North Macedonia) Erkan Jusuf (1 Feb 2009 – Aug 2009)
- (North Macedonia) Džemail Zekiri (1 Sep 2009 – 28 Sep 2009)
- (North Macedonia) Kemal Ameti (29 Sep 2009 – Dec 2009)
- (Serbia) Dragan Antić (10 Jan 2010 – Jun 2010)
