= FK Nov Milenium =

ФК Нов Милениум FK Nov Milenium
- Full name: Fudbalski Klub Nov Milenium
- Founded: 1951 (as Mladost)
- Dissolved: 2008
- Ground: Stadion Sušica
- Capacity: 1,500 Manager : Misho Markoski

FK Nov Milenium (Macedonian: ФК Нов Милениум) was a football club based in the village Sušica near Strumica, North Macedonia.

== History ==
The club was founded in 1951 as FK Mladost Sušica.
