= 2012–13 FK Vardar season =

Vardar
2012–13 season
- Chairman: Zoran Shishkovski
- Manager: Ilcho Gjorgioski (Note: Gjorgioski led the team in the matches against BATE Borisov.); Blagoja Milevski (Note: Milevski was in the first period led the team from July 2012 to January 2013, and then later returned to his coaching seat in April 2013.); Nikola Ilievski
- Stadium: Philip II Arena
- First League: 1st
- Macedonian Cup: Semi-finals
- Champions League: Second Qualifying Round
- Top goalscorer: League: Jovan Kostovski (22); All: Jovan Kostovski (23)
- Highest home attendance: 28,500 vs BATE Borisov; 25 July 2012
- Lowest home attendance: 0 (Two matches)
Home colours	Away colours

The 2012–13 season was a FK Vardar's 21st consecutive season in First League. This article shows player statistics and all official matches that the club was played during the 2012–13 season.

In that season Vardar was won the championship for the second consecutive time, sixth time in his history.

== Squad ==
As of March, 2013

Note: Flags indicate national team as defined under FIFA eligibility rules; some limited exceptions apply. Players may hold more than one non-FIFA nationality.

No.	Pos.	Nation	Player
1	GK	SRB	Goran Simov
12	GK	MKD	Kostadin Zahov
25	GK	SLO	Dejan Milić
3	DF	MKD	Dean Tomeski
4	DF	SRB	Radenko Bojović
5	DF	MKD	Zlatko Tanevski
15	DF	MKD	Vladimir Dimitrovski
29	DF	MKD	Dimitrija Lazarevski
33	DF	MKD	Miroslav Vajs (captain)
8	MF	MKD	Predrag Rangjelovikj
9	MF	SRB	Aleksandar Petrović

No.	Pos.	Nation	Player
10	MF	MKD	Ostoja Stjepanovikj
20	MF	ESP	Jorge Giménez
21	MF	MKD	Andrej Acevski
24	MF	MKD	Aleksandar Temelkov
26	MF	MKD	Mite Cikarski
7	FW	MKD	Borche Manevski
11	FW	MKD	Dragan Georgiev
13	FW	MKD	Filip Petrov
17	FW	MKD	Aco Stojkov
19	FW	POR	Bonifácio
23	FW	MKD	Jovan Kostovski

== Competitions ==
=== First League ===
==== League table ====
Pos	Team	Pld	W	D	L	GF	GA	GD	Pts	Qualification or relegation
1	Vardar (C)	33	20	8	5	71	21	+50	68	Qualification for the Champions League second qualifying round
2	Metalurg	33	18	9	6	48	28	+20	63	Qualification for the Europa League first qualifying round
3	Horizont Turnovo	33	17	12	4	49	31	+18	63	Qualification for the Europa League first qualifying round
4	Rabotnichki	33	16	5	12	47	42	+5	53	
5	Shkëndija (Note: Shkëndija were deducted three points for leaving the pitch in the match against Teteks in the 19th round.)	33	13	8	12	52	49	+3	44	

Source: MacedonianFootball.com
Rules for classification: 1) Points; 2) Goal difference; 3) Goals scored; 4) Head-to-head points; 5) Head-to-head goal difference; 6) Head-to-head away goals scored (only if two teams); 7) Head-to-head goals scored; 8) Draw; 9) Play-off. (Note: Criteria 2, 3 and 8 is only used if not deciding Champion, teams for UEFA competitions or relegation).
(C) Champions

==== Results summary ====
Overall								Home						Away					
Pld	W	D	L	GF	GA	GD	Pts	W	D	L	GF	GA	GD	W	D	L	GF	GA	GD
33	20	8	5	71	21	+50	68	14	1	2	53	11	+42	6	7	3	18	10	+8

==== Matches ====
12 August 2012 1	Vardar	3–2	Rabotnichki	Skopje
20:00	Manevski 21'; Kostovski 35'; Giménez 37'	Report	Iseni 55'; Velkoski 68'	Stadium: Philip II Arena; Attendance: 4,000; Referee: Dimitar Mechkarovski (Skopje)

19 August 2012 2	Napredok	1–0	Vardar	Kichevo
17:00	Simjanoski 66'	Report		Stadium: Gradski stadion Attendance: 3,000; Referee: Goran Spirkoski (Prilep)

26 August 2012 3	Vardar	4–0	Teteks	Skopje
20:00	Kostovski 17'; Georgiev 42'; Giménez 60'; Stojaković 84'	Report		Stadium: Philip II Arena; Attendance: 1,500; Referee: Zoran Boshkov (Negotino)

29 August 2012 4	Renova	0–2	Vardar	Tetovo
17:00		Report	Georgiev 60'; Kostovski 78'	Stadium: Gradski stadion Attendance: 150; Referee: Marjan Markoski (Ohrid)

2 September 2012 5	Vardar	5–1	Horizont Turnovo	Skopje
20:00	Georgiev 6'; Kostovski 42', 45'; Ilievski 65'; Tanevski 68'	Report	Blazhevski 47'	Stadium: Philip II Arena; Attendance: 1,000; Referee: Marjan Markoski (Ohrid)

16 September 2012 6	Vardar	4–0	Drita	Skopje
20:00	Petrov 45', 69'; Kostovski 46', 78'	Report		Stadium: Philip II Arena; Attendance: 500; Referee: Marjan Eckoski (Ohrid)

23 September 2012 7	Sileks	0–0	Vardar	Kratovo
15:00		Report		Stadium: Gradski stadion Attendance: 500; Referee: Aleksandar Angelov (Kochani)

30 September 2012 8	Vardar	3–1	Pelister	Skopje
20:00	Petrov 44'; Tanevski 87'; Kostovski 90+1'	Report	Glavevski 50'	Stadium: Philip II Arena; Attendance: 5,000; Referee: Josip Barton (Tetovo)

7 October 2012 9	Shkëndija	2–1	Vardar	Tetovo
15:00	Ejupi 22'; Taipi 71'	Report	Stjepanovikj 47' (pen.)	Stadium: Gradski stadion Attendance: 9,000; Referee: Marjan Eckoski (Ohrid)

21 October 2012 10	Vardar	1–1	Metalurg Skopje	Skopje
14:00	Manevski 48'	Report	Dalcheski 18'	Stadium: Philip II Arena; Attendance: 0 Referee: Dimitar Mechkarovski (Skopje)

28 October 2012 11	Bregalnica Shtip	1–1	Vardar	Shtip
13:00	Naumov 73'	Report	Manevski 58'	Stadium: Gradski stadion Attendance: 1,500; Referee: Josip Barton (Tetovo)

31 October 2012 12	Rabotnichki	0–2	Vardar	Skopje
13:00		Report	Giménez 49'; Kostovski 78'	Stadium: Stadion Boris Trajkovski; Attendance: 1,000; Referee: Dejan Jakimovski (Skopje)

4 November 2012 13	Vardar	1–0	Napredok	Kumanovo
13:00	Stjepanovikj 22' (pen.)	Report		Stadium: Milano Arena; Attendance: 0 Referee: Faton Mustafi (Tetovo)

11 November 2012 14	Teteks	0–0	Vardar	Tetovo
13:00		Report		Stadium: Gradski stadion Attendance: 500; Referee: Goran Spirkoski (Prilep)

18 November 2012 15	Vardar	3–0	Renova	Skopje
16:30	Tanevski 23'; Guobadia 26'; Stjepanovikj 71'	Report		Stadium: Philip II Arena; Attendance: 400; Referee: Stevche Shuleski (Ohrid)

25 November 2012 16	Horizont Turnovo	0–0	Vardar	Turnovo
13:00		Report		Stadium: Stadion Kukush; Attendance: 2,500; Referee: Marjan Markoski (Ohrid)

4 December 2012 17	Drita	0–1	Vardar	Tetovo
13:00		Report	Manevski 85'	Stadium: Gradski stadion Attendance: 500; Referee: Marjan Markoski (Ohrid)

9 December 2012 18	Vardar	5–0	Sileks	Skopje
16:00	Kostovski 4', 35', 59'; Stojaković 57'; Georgiev 90'	Report		Stadium: Philip II Arena; Attendance: 300; Referee: Dalibor Gjorgjevski (Kumanovo)

6 March 2013 19	Pelister	0–0	Vardar	Bitola
14:00		Report		Stadium: Stadion Tumbe Kafe; Attendance: 4,000; Referee: Marjan Eckoski (Ohrid)

12 March 2013 20	Vardar	6–1	Shkëndija	Skopje
14:00	Kostovski 13'; Stojkov 42', 45+2'; Stjepanovikj 45'; Lazarevski 64'; Petrov 83'	Report	Ejupi 38'	Stadium: Philip II Arena; Attendance: 300; Referee: Marjan Eckoski (Ohrid)

17 March 2013 21	Metalurg Skopje	3–2	Vardar	Skopje
14:00	Radeski 43'; Simonovski 89', 90+1'	Summary	Stjepanovikj 73' (pen.); Stojkov 82'	Stadium: Stadion Zhelezarnica; Attendance: 1,500; Referee: Aleksandar Stavrev (Skopje)

30 March 2013 22	Vardar	3–0	Bregalnica Shtip	Skopje
19:00	Vajs 17'; Bozhinov 33' (o.g.); Stojkov 52'	Report		Stadium: Philip II Arena; Attendance: 500; Referee: Faton Mustafi (Tetovo)

3 April 2013 23	Vardar	1–2	Rabotnichki	Skopje
19:00	Rangjelovikj 44'; Milić (red card) 90'	Report	Adem 67'; Najdoski 90+1'	Stadium: Philip II Arena; Attendance: 500; Referee: Dimitar Mechkarovski (Skopje)

7 April 2013 24	Bregalnica Shtip	1–1	Vardar	Shtip
13:00	Simov 52' (o.g.)	Report	Dimitrovski 32'	Stadium: Gradski stadion Referee: Zorancho Temelkov (Kavadarci)

13 April 2013 25	Vardar	0–1	Pelister	Skopje
19:30		Report	Elmazovski 49' (pen.)	Stadium: Philip II Arena; Attendance: 3,000; Referee: Goran Spirkoski (Prilep)

21 April 2013 26	Drita	1–3	Vardar	Bogovinje
16:00	Ramadani 43'	Report	Kostovski 54'; Temelkov 58'; Stojkov 71'	Stadium: Stadion Bogovinje; Attendance: 300; Referee: Goran Spirkoski (Prilep)

27 April 2013 27	Vardar	2–1	Sileks	Skopje
20:00	Manevski 4'; Giménez 60'	Report	Georgiev 90'	Stadium: Philip II Arena; Attendance: 500; Referee: Faton Mustafi (Tetovo)

7 May 2013 28	Teteks	0–3	Vardar	Skopje
16:30		Report	Kostovski 4', 86'; Cikarski 54'	Stadium: Stadion Gjorche Petrov; Attendance: 500; Referee: Dalibor Gjorgjievski (Kumanovo)

11 May 2013 29	Vardar	3–1	Renova	Skopje
20:00	Kostovski 4', 9'; Petrov 42'	Report	Emini 53'	Stadium: Philip II Arena; Attendance: 400; Referee: Stevche Shuleski (Ohrid)

15 May 2013 30	Shkëndija	0–1	Vardar	Tetovo
16:30		Report	Petrov 73'	Stadium: Gradski stadion Attendance: 3,000; Referee: Dalibor Gjorgjevski (Kumanovo)

19 May 2013 31	Vardar	4–0	Napredok	Skopje
16:30	Manevski 28' (pen.); Kostovski 42', 80', 88'	Report		Stadium: Philip II Arena; Attendance: 200; Referee: Stevche Shuleski (Ohrid)

29 May 2013 32	Metalurg Skopje	1–1	Vardar	Skopje
17:00	Krstev 77'	Report	Rangjelovikj 23'	Stadium: Stadion Zhelezarnica; Attendance: 2,000; Referee: Dimitar Mechkarovski (Skopje)

2 June 2013 33	Vardar	5–0	Horizont Turnovo	Skopje
17:00	Manevski 17'; Kostovski 33' (pen.); Stojkov 66', 78'; Petrov 73'	Report		Stadium: Philip II Arena; Attendance: 4,000; Referee: Josip Barton (Tetovo)

=== Macedonian Football Cup ===
==== First round ====
22 August 2012	Rufeja	0–2	Vardar	Brvenica
17:00		Report	Temelkov 20'; Geshoski 36'	Stadium: Stadion Miletino; Referee: Marjan Markoski (Ohrid)

==== Second round ====
19 September 2012 First leg	Vardar	2–0	Gorno Lisiche	Skopje
20:00	Stojaković 16'; Petrov 33'	Report		Stadium: Philip II Arena

26 September 2012 Second leg	Gorno Lisiche	1–2 (1–4 agg.)	Vardar	Skopje
15:00	Kolekjeski 90'		Temelkov 34'; Geshoski 40'	Stadium: Stadion Gorno Lisiche; Referee: Dimitar Mechkarovski (Skopje)

==== Quarter-final ====
7 November 2012 First leg	Pelister	0–1	Vardar	Bitola
13:00		Report	Petrov 77'	Stadium: Tumbe Kafe; Attendance: 1,700; Referee: Marjan Eckoski (Ohrid)

21 November 2012 Second leg	Vardar	2–0 (3–0 agg.)	Pelister	Skopje
18:00	Petrov 66'; Giménez 85'	Report		Stadium: Philip II Arena; Attendance: 1,500; Referee: Marjan Eckoski (Ohrid)

==== Semi-final ====
17 April 2013 First leg	Shkëndija	0–0	Vardar	Tetovo
16:00		Report		Stadium: Gradski stadion Attendance: 4,500; Referee: Marjan Markoski (Ohrid)

1 May 2013 Second leg	Vardar	1–1 (1–1a agg.)	Shkëndija	Skopje
18:30	Petrov 90'	Report	Rexhepi 81'	Stadium: Philip II Arena; Attendance: 2,000; Referee: Marjan Eckovski (Ohrid)

=== UEFA Champions League ===
==== Second qualifying round ====
18 July 2012 First leg	BATE Borisov (Belarus)	3–2	(North Macedonia) Vardar	Barysaw
18:00	Mazalewski 41'; Rodionov 90+2', 90+4'	Report	Kostovski 54'; Stjepanović 62'	Stadium: Haradski Stadium; Attendance: 5,180; Referee: Olivier Thual (France)

25 July 2012 Second leg	Vardar (North Macedonia)	0–0 (2–3 agg.)	(Belarus) BATE Borisov	Skopje
20:00		Report		Stadium: Philip II Arena; Attendance: 28,500; Referee: Paolo Valeri (Italy)

== Statistics ==
=== Top scorers ===
Rank	Name	League	Europe	Cup	Total
1	(North Macedonia) Jovan Kostovski	22	1	–	23
2	(North Macedonia) Filip Petrov	7	–	4	11
3	(North Macedonia) Borche Manevski	7	–	–	7
3	(North Macedonia) Aco Stojkov	7	–	–	7
4	(North Macedonia) Ostoja Stjepanovikj	5	1	–	6
5	(Spain) Jorge Giménez	4	–	1	5
6	(North Macedonia) Dragan Georgiev	4	–	–	4
7	(Serbia) Igor Stojaković	2	–	1	3
7	(North Macedonia) Zlatko Tanevski	3	–	–	3
7	(North Macedonia) Aleksandar Temelkov	1	–	2	3
10	(North Macedonia) Predrag Rangjelovikj	2	–	–	2
11	(North Macedonia) Mite Cikarski	1	–	–	1
11	(North Macedonia) Blagoja Geshoski	–	–	2	1
11	(Nigeria) Osa Guobadia	1	–	–	1
11	(North Macedonia) Dimitrija Lazarevski	1	–	–	1
11	(North Macedonia) Miroslav Vajs	1	–	–	1
	Own goals	1	–	–	1
	TOTALS	71	3	10	83
