= 2011–12 FK Vardar season =

Vardar
2011–12 season
- Chairman: Zoran Shishkovski
- Manager: Ilcho Gjorgioski
- Stadium: Philip II Arena; Gjorche Petrov Stadium
- First League: 1st
- Macedonian Cup: Semi-finals
- Top goalscorer: League: Filip Ivanovski (24); All: Filip Ivanovski (25)
- Highest home attendance: 8,000 vs Rabotnichki; 9 August 2011
- Lowest home attendance: 500 vs Napredok; 19 November 2011
| Home colours | Away colours |

The 2011–12 season was FK Vardar's 20th consecutive season in First League. This article shows player statistics and all official matches that the club played during the 2011–12 season.

Before that season, the Vardar was spared from relegation because as it merged with Miravci. Vardar was won their sixth Macedonian championship, first after nine years.

== Squad ==
As of 25 February 2012

Note: Flags indicate national team as defined under FIFA eligibility rules; some limited exceptions apply. Players may hold more than one non-FIFA nationality.

| No. | Pos. | Nation | Player |
|---|---|---|---|
| 1 | GK | SRB | Goran Simov |
| 12 | GK | MKD | Kostadin Zahov |
| 3 | DF | MKD | Zlatko Boshkovski |
| 4 | DF | SRB | Radenko Bojović |
| 5 | DF | MKD | Zlatko Tanevski |
| 6 | DF | MKD | Toni Veljanovski |
| 27 | DF | MKD | Milan Ilievski |
| 33 | DF | MKD | Miroslav Vajs |
| 8 | MF | MKD | Predrag Rangjelovikj |
| 10 | MF | SRB | Igor Stojaković |
| 13 | MF | MKD | Zhan Manovski |

| No. | Pos. | Nation | Player |
|---|---|---|---|
| 17 | MF | MKD | Ostoja Stjepanovikj |
| 18 | MF | NGR | Osa Guobadia |
| 19 | MF | MKD | Vladimir Tuneski |
| 21 | MF | MKD | Andrej Acevski |
| 26 | MF | MKD | Mite Cikarski |
| 9 | FW | MKD | Jovan Kostovski |
| 11 | FW | BRA | Lico |
| 20 | FW | MKD | Filip Kolekjevski |
| 22 | FW | MKD | Filip Ivanovski (captain) |
| 23 | FW | MKD | Filip Petrov |
| 24 | FW | NGR | Ibezito Ogbonna |

== Competitions ==
=== First League ===
==== League table ====
| Pos | Team | Pld | W | D | L | GF | GA | GD | Pts | Qualification or relegation |
|---|---|---|---|---|---|---|---|---|---|---|
| 1 | Vardar (C) | 33 | 22 | 10 | 1 | 50 | 15 | +35 | 76 | Qualification for the Champions League second qualifying round |
| 2 | Metalurg | 33 | 19 | 10 | 4 | 53 | 16 | +37 | 67 | Qualification for the Europa League first qualifying round (Note: Renova qualified for the Europa League first qualifying round by winning the 2011–12 Macedonian Football Cup.) |
| 3 | Shkëndija | 33 | 20 | 6 | 7 | 53 | 28 | +25 | 66 | Qualification for the Europa League first qualifying round |
| 4 | Renova | 33 | 13 | 13 | 7 | 56 | 38 | +18 | 52 | Qualification for the Europa League first qualifying round |
| 5 | Bregalnica Shtip | 33 | 13 | 6 | 14 | 51 | 47 | +4 | 45 | |

Source: MacedonianFootball.com, Soccerway
Rules for classification: 1) Points; 2) Goal difference; 3) Goals scored; 4) Head-to-head points; 5) Head-to-head goal difference; 6) Head-to-head away goals scored (only if two teams); 7) Head-to-head goals scored; 8) Draw; 9) Play-off. (Note: Criteria 2, 3 and 8 is only used if not deciding Champion, teams for UEFA competitions or relegation).
(C) Champions

==== Results summary ====
| Overall | | | | | | | | Home | | | | | | Away | | | | | |
| Pld | W | D | L | GF | GA | GD | Pts | W | D | L | GF | GA | GD | W | D | L | GF | GA | GD |
|---|---|---|---|---|---|---|---|---|---|---|---|---|---|---|---|---|---|---|---|
| 33 | 22 | 10 | 1 | 50 | 15 | +35 | 76 | 13 | 4 | 0 | 33 | 7 | +26 | 9 | 6 | 1 | 17 | 8 | +9 |

==== Matches ====
| 30 July 2011 1 | 11 Oktomvri | 0–1 | Vardar | Prilep |
| 17:00 | | Report | Ivanovski 58' | Stadium: Stadion Goce Delchev; Attendance: 5,000; Referee: Marjan Markoski (Ohrid) |

| 9 August 2011 2 | Vardar | 1–0 | Rabotnichki | Skopje |
| 20:00 | Ivanovski 37' | Report | | Stadium: Philip II Arena; Attendance: 8,000; Referee: Dimitar Mechkarovski (Prilep) |

| 13 August 2011 3 | Napredok | 0–1 | Vardar | Kichevo |
| 16:30 | | Report | Acevski 60' | Stadium: Gradski stadion Attendance: 3,500; Referee: Goran Spirkoski (Prilep) |

| 21 August 2011 4 | Vardar | 0–0 | Renova | Skopje |
| 20:00 | | Report | | Stadium: Philip II Arena; Attendance: 2,000; Referee: Zoran Boshkov (Negotino) |

| 27 August 2011 5 | Ohrid | 0–2 | Vardar | Ohrid |
| 16:30 | | Report | Ilievski 75'; Rangjelovikj 85' | Stadium: SRC Biljanini Izvori; Attendance: 2,000; Referee: Petar Veljanovski (Bitola) |

| 10 September 2011 6 | Vardar | 2–1 | Sileks | Skopje |
| 20:00 | Ilievski 14'; Ivanovski 18' | Report | Temelkov 18' | Stadium: Philip II Arena; Attendance: 700; Referee: Marjan Markoski (Ohrid) |

| 18 September 2011 7 | Bregalnica Shtip | 2–3 | Vardar | Shtip |
| 14:30 | Zdravkov 11' (pen.); Shishkov 87' | Report | Veljanovski 21'; Ivanovski 32' (pen.); Cikarski 85' | Stadium: Gradski stadion Attendance: 1,000; Referee: Zoran Boshkov (Negotino) |

| 24 September 2011 8 | Teteks | 0–0 | Vardar | Tetovo |
| 15:00 | | Report | | Stadium: Gradski stadion Attendance: 2,000; Referee: Marjan Markoski (Ohrid) |

| 1 October 2011 9 | Vardar | 2–0 | Shkëndija | Skopje |
| 13:00 | Lico 57'; Ivanovski 82' | Report | | Stadium: Philip II Arena; Attendance: 3,000; Referee: Zoran Petkovski (Veles) |

| 15 October 2011 10 | Metalurg Skopje | 1–1 | Vardar | Skopje |
| 14:00 | Krstev 62' | Report | Ivanovski 12' (pen.) | Stadium: Stadion Zhelezarnica; Attendance: 2,500; Referee: Dimitar Mechkarovski (Skopje) |

| 22 October 2011 11 | Vardar | 3–0 | Horizont Turnovo | Skopje |
| 14:00 | Milushev 71' (o.g.); Ivanovski 84', 90+2' | Report | | Stadium: Stadion Gjorche Petrov; Attendance: 1,000; Referee: Ljubomir Krstevski (Bitola) |

| 29 October 2011 12 | Vardar | 2–0 | 11 Oktomvri | Skopje |
| 14:00 | Petrov 15'; Bojović 57' | Report | | Stadium: Stadion Gjorche Petrov; Attendance: 1,000; Referee: Stevche Shuleski (Ohrid) |

| 5 November 2011 13 | Rabotnichki | 1–2 | Vardar | Skopje |
| 13:00 | Manevski 24' | Report | Ivanovski 77', 90+4' | Stadium: Stadion Boris Trajkovski; Attendance: 3,500; Referee: Marco Borg ( Malta) |

| 19 November 2011 14 | Vardar | 5–1 | Napredok | Skopje |
| 13:00 | Ivanovski 10' (pen.), 69', 71', 72'; Lico 60' | Report | Nebiu 87' | Stadium: Stadion Gjorche Petrov; Attendance: 500; Referee: Dalibor Gjorgjevski (Kumanovo) |

| 22 November 2011 15 | Renova | 0–0 | Vardar | Tetovo |
| 13:00 | | Report | | Stadium: Gradski stadion Attendance: 1,000; Referee: Marjan Eckoski (Ohrid) |

| 26 November 2011 16 | Vardar | 2–0 | Ohrid | Skopje |
| 13:00 | Veljanovski 89'; Guobadia 90' | Report | | Stadium: Stadion Gjorche Petrov; Attendance: 600; Referee: Zoran Petkovski (Veles) |

| 3 December 2011 17 | Sileks | 1–1 | Vardar | Kratovo |
| 13:00 | Jovanović 80' | Report | Lico 31' | Stadium: Gradski stadion Attendance: 1,500; Referee: Ljubomir Krstevski (Bitola) |

| 11 December 2011 18 | Vardar | 3–0 | Bregalnica Shtip | Skopje |
| 13:00 | Vajs 65'; Grozdanoski 71'; Petrov 83' | Report | | Stadium: Stadion Gjorche Petrov; Attendance: 2,500; Referee: Aleksandar Stavrev (Skopje) |

| 11 March 2012 19 | Vardar | 1–0 | Teteks | Skopje |
| 14:00 | Stojaković 90+3' | Report | | Stadium: Stadion Boris Trajkovski; Attendance: 1,000; Referee: Marjan Markoski (Ohrid) |

| 22 March 2012 20 | Shkëndija | 0–1 | Vardar | Tetovo |
| 14:00 | | Report | Ivanovski 53' | Stadium: Gradski stadion Attendance: 9,700; Referee: Zoran Boshkov (Negotino) |

| 25 March 2012 21 | Vardar | 1–0 | Metalurg Skopje | Skopje |
| 14:00 | Petrov 83' | Summary | | Stadium: Stadion Gjorche Petrov; Attendance: 2,500; Referee: Aleksandar Stavrev (Skopje) |

| 28 March 2012 22 | Horizont Turnovo | 1–2 | Vardar | Turnovo |
| 15:00 | Mitrev 74' | Report | Ivanovski 39'; Kostovski 47' | Stadium: Stadion Kukush; Attendance: 700; Referee: Dalibor Gjorgjevski (Kumanovo) |

| 31 March 2012 23 | Vardar | 2–1 | Bregalnica Shtip | Skopje |
| 16:00 | Ogbonna 18' (pen.); Ivanovski 90' | Report | Mitrov 82' | Stadium: Stadion Gjorche Petrov; Attendance: 1,000; Referee: Stevche Shuleski (Ohrid) |

| 8 April 2012 24 | Napredok | 0–0 | Vardar | Kichevo |
| 16:00 | | Report | | Stadium: Gradski stadion Attendance: 2,500; Referee: Zoran Petkovski (Veles) |

| 11 April 2012 25 | Vardar | 4–0 | Ohrid | Skopje |
| 16:00 | Ivanovski 1', 69', 85'; Ogbonna 75' | Report | | Stadium: Stadion Gjorche Petrov; Attendance: 700; Referee: Petar Mantev (Negotino) |

| 14 April 2012 26 | Teteks | 0–0 | Vardar | Tetovo |
| 16:00 | | Report | | Stadium: Gradski stadion Attendance: 500; Referee: Zoran Petkovski (Veles) |

| 21 April 2012 27 | Vardar | 0–0 | Horizont Turnovo | Skopje |
| 16:00 | | Report | | Stadium: Stadion Gjorche Petrov; Attendance: 700; Referee: Josip Barton (Tetovo) |

| 29 April 2012 28 | 11 Oktomvri | 0–1 | Vardar | Prilep |
| 16:30 | | Report | S. Ivanovski 23' (o.g.) | Stadium: Stadion Goce Delchev; Attendance: 3,000; Referee: Stojanche Stojanov (Shtip) |

| 6 May 2012 29 | Vardar | 2–2 | Rabotnichki | Skopje |
| 16:30 | Bojović 45+2'; Ivanovski 71' (pen.) | Report | Velkoski 3'; Manevski 67' | Stadium: Stadion Gjorche Petrov; Attendance: 2,000; Referee: Aleksandar Stavrev (Skopje) |

| 13 May 2012 30 | Sileks | 1–2 | Vardar | Kratovo |
| 16:30 | Bozhinovski (red card) 37'; Zarevski 32' | Report | Ivanovski 22', 41' | Stadium: Gradski stadion Attendance: 1,200; Referee: Zoran Boshkov (Negotino) |

| 16 May 2012 31 | Vardar | 1–1 | Renova | Skopje |
| 17:00 | Asani 20' (o.g.) | Report | Emini 57' | Stadium: Stadion Gjorche Petrov; Attendance: 1,000; Referee: Stojanche Stojanov (Štip) |

| 20 May 2012 32 | Shkëndija | 1–0 | Vardar | Tetovo |
| 17:00 | Elmazovski 47' | Report | | Stadium: Gradski stadion Attendance: 4,500; Referee: Marjan Markoski (Ohrid) |

| 23 May 2012 33 | Vardar | 2–1 | Metalurg Skopje | Skopje |
| 17:00 | Ivanovski 79'; Stojaković 90+2' | Report | Tanevski 43' (o.g.) | Stadium: Philip II Arena; Attendance: 3,500; Referee: Aleksandar Stavrev (Skopje) |

=== Macedonian Football Cup ===
==== First round ====
| 17 August 2011 | Gorno Lisiche | 0–3 | Vardar | Skopje |
| 16:00 | | | Ali; Petrov; T. Veljanovski | Stadium: Stadion Gorno Lisiche |

==== Second round ====
| 15 September 2011 First leg | Vardar | 6–1 | Tikvesh | Skopje |
| 18:30 | Petrov 2', 6', 16', 31'; Ivanovski 69' (pen.); Lico 86' | Report | Jakov 5' | Stadium: Philip II Arena |

| 28 September 2011 Second leg | Tikvesh | 0–1 (1–7 agg.) | Vardar | Kavadarci |
| 14:30 | | Report | Petrov 58' | Stadium: Gradski stadion |

==== Quarter-final ====
| 19 October 2011 First leg | Vardar | 2–0 | 11 Oktomvri | Skopje |
| 18:00 | T. Veljanovski 36'; Petrov 65' | Report | | Stadium: Philip II Arena; Attendance: 400; Referee: Zoran Boshkov (Negotino) |

| 9 November 2011 Second leg | 11 Oktomvri | 2–1 (2–3 agg.) | Vardar | Prilep |
| 13:00 | A. Veljanovski 55'; Gesoski 80' (pen.) | Report | Petrov 75' | Stadium: Stadion Goce Delchev; Attendance: 300; Referee: Ljubomir Krstevski (Bitola) |

==== Semi-final ====
| 4 April 2012 First leg | Vardar | 1−1 | Renova | Skopje |
| 16:00 | Stjepanovikj 90+1' | Report | Vajs 20' (o.g.) | Stadium: Stadion Gjorche Petrov; Attendance: 1,000; Referee: Zoran Boshkov (Negotino) |

| 25 April 2012 Second leg | Renova | 0−0 (a1–1 agg.) | Vardar | Tetovo |
| 16:00 | | Report | | Stadium: Gradski stadion Attendance: 2,000; Referee: Goran Spirkoski (Prilep) |

== Statistics ==
=== Top scorers ===
| Rank | Name | League | Cup | Total |
|---|---|---|---|---|
| 1 | (North Macedonia) Filip Ivanovski | 24 | 1 | 25 |
| 2 | (North Macedonia) Filip Petrov | 3 | 8 | 11 |
| 3 | (Brazil) Lico | 3 | 1 | 4 |
| 3 | (North Macedonia) Toni Veljanovski | 2 | 2 | 4 |
| 5 | (Serbia) Radenko Bojović | 2 | – | 2 |
| 5 | (North Macedonia) Milan Ilievski | 2 | – | 2 |
| 5 | (Nigeria) Ibezito Ogbonna | 2 | – | 2 |
| 5 | (Serbia) Igor Stojaković | 2 | – | 2 |
| 9 | (North Macedonia) Ilber Ali | – | 1 | 1 |
| 9 | (North Macedonia) Mite Cikarski | 1 | – | 1 |
| 9 | (North Macedonia) Vlatko Grozdanoski | 1 | – | 1 |
| 9 | (North Macedonia) Jovan Kostovski | 1 | – | 1 |
| 9 | (Nigeria) Osa Guobadia | 1 | – | 1 |
| 9 | (North Macedonia) Predrag Rangjelovikj | 1 | – | 1 |
| 9 | (North Macedonia) Ostoja Stjepanovikj | – | 1 | 1 |
| 9 | (North Macedonia) Miroslav Vajs | 1 | – | 1 |
| | TOTALS | 50 | 14 | 64 |
