= List of FK Vardar players =

The following is a list of players who was played for FK Vardar.

== Notable players ==
- (Armenia) Tigran Barseghyan
- (Armenia) Artak Dashyan
- (Armenia) Hovhannes Hambardzumyan
- (Armenia) Artur Miranyan
- (Australia) (North Macedonia) Žarko Odžakov
- (Australia) Dean Tomeski
- (Bosnia and Herzegovina) Almedin Beganović
- (Bosnia and Herzegovina) Senijad Ibričić
- (Bosnia and Herzegovina) Boško Stupić
- (Bosnia and Herzegovina) Vladko Zelenika
- (Brazil) Jonathan Boareto
- (Brazil) (North Macedonia) Aguinaldo Braga
- (Brazil) Deílson
- (Brazil) Fábio Silva
- (Brazil) Juan Felipe
- (Brazil) Lico
- (Brazil) Neno
- (Brazil) Rogério Oliveira
- (Brazil) Thiago Rodrigues
- (Brazil) (North Macedonia) Wandeir
- (Brazil) Zé Carlos
- (Bulgaria) Rosen Kaptiev
- (Bulgaria) Mario Petkov
- (Canada) (Serbia) Mike Stojanović
- (Croatia) Matija Kobetić
- (Georgia (country)) Jaba Jighauri
- (Ghana) Daniel Addo
- (Ghana) Baba Iddi
- (North Macedonia) Boban Babunski
- (North Macedonia) Aleksandar Bajevski
- (North Macedonia) Vancho Balevski
- (North Macedonia) Zoran Boshkovski
- (North Macedonia) Chaslav Bozhinovski
- (North Macedonia) Rade Chaparevski
- (North Macedonia) Saša Ćirić
- (North Macedonia) Slavko Dacevski
- (North Macedonia) Vasil Dilev
- (North Macedonia) Kocho Dimitrovski
- (North Macedonia) Kiril Dojchinovski
- (North Macedonia) Andon Donchevski
- (North Macedonia) Jovche Djipunov
- (North Macedonia) Tode Georgievski
- (North Macedonia) Slobodan Gorachinov
- (North Macedonia) Atanas Grncharov
- (North Macedonia) Boban Grncharov
- (North Macedonia) Momchilo Groshev
- (North Macedonia) Vlatko Grozdanoski
- (North Macedonia) Vasil Gunev
- (North Macedonia) Saša Ilić
- (North Macedonia) Filip Ivanovski
- (North Macedonia) Toni Jakimovski
- (North Macedonia) Chedomir Janevski
- (North Macedonia) Gjore Jovanovski
- (North Macedonia) Gogo Jovchev
- (North Macedonia) Dragi Kanatlarovski
- (North Macedonia) Jovan Kostovski
- (North Macedonia) Atanas Mechkarov
- (North Macedonia) Borche Micevski
- (North Macedonia) Petar Miloshevski
- (North Macedonia) Sasho Miloshevski
- (North Macedonia) Sokrat Mojsov
- (North Macedonia) Ilija Najdoski
- (North Macedonia) Igor Nikolovski
- (North Macedonia) Vlado Nikolovski
- (North Macedonia) Tome Pachovski
- (North Macedonia) Darko Panchev
- (North Macedonia) (Serbia) Predrag Ranđelović
- (North Macedonia) Vasil Ringov
- (North Macedonia) Artim Shakiri
- (North Macedonia) Toni Savevski
- (North Macedonia) Zhanko Savov
- (North Macedonia) Dragi Setinov
- (North Macedonia) (Bulgaria) Kiril Simonovski
- (North Macedonia) Metodije Spasovski
- (North Macedonia) Vančo Spasovski
- (North Macedonia) Josif Srebrov
- (North Macedonia) Vujadin Stanojković
- (North Macedonia) Ostoja Stjepanović
- (North Macedonia) Darko Stojkoski
- (North Macedonia) Aco Stojkov
- (North Macedonia) Petar Shulinchevski
- (North Macedonia) Gjorgji Todorovski
- (North Macedonia) Tomche Trajanovski
- (North Macedonia) Ivan Trichkovski
- (North Macedonia) Bora Uzunov
- (North Macedonia) Miroslav Vajs
- (North Macedonia) Aleksandar Vasoski
- (North Macedonia) Dragan Veselinovski
- (North Macedonia) Blagoje Vidinić
- (North Macedonia) Milosh Vuchidolov
- (North Macedonia) Srgjan Zaharievski
- (North Macedonia) Gordan Zdravkov
- (North Macedonia) Muarem Zekir
- (Montenegro) Nemanja Mijušković
- (Montenegro) Igor Pavlović
- (Montenegro) (Serbia) Aleksandar Radović
- (Montenegro) Stevan Reljić
- (Nigeria) Abraham Alechenwu
- (Nigeria) Blessing Chinedu
- (Nigeria) Osa Guobadia
- (Nigeria) Ali Musa
- (Nigeria) Ibezito Ogbonna
- (Nigeria) Jero Shakpoke
- (Portugal) Bonifácio
- (Serbia) (Bosnia and Herzegovina) Edin Ademović
- (Serbia) Jovica Anđelković
- (Serbia) (Bosnia and Herzegovina) Rašid Avdić
- (Serbia) Zoran Banković
- (Serbia) Radenko Bojović
- (Serbia) Dejan Branković
- (Serbia) Miroslav Draganić
- (Serbia) Nikola Jevtić
- (Serbia) Ivan Jovanović
- (Serbia) Boško Kajganić
- (Serbia) Željko Kovačević
- (Serbia) Dragan Ljubisavljević
- (Serbia) Vladan Milosavljev
- (Serbia) Nemanja Milosavljević
- (Serbia) Vladan Milosavljević
- (Serbia) Ibrahim Muratović
- (Serbia) Dragan Mutibarić
- (Serbia) Milan Perendija
- (Serbia) Aleksandar Petrović
- (Serbia) Bogoljub Ranđelović
- (Serbia) (North Macedonia) Goran Simov
- (Serbia) Lazar Stanišić
- (Serbia) Slaven Stanković
- (Serbia) Igor Stojaković
- (Serbia) Delivoje Šarenac
- (Serbia) Dušan Šujica
- (Serbia) Dragan Trajković
- (Serbia) Aleksandar Trninić
- (Serbia) Ljubiša Tumbaković
- (Serbia) Stojmir Urošević
- (Serbia) Velimir Zdravković
- (Serbia) Milan Živadinović
- (Serbia) Goran Živanović
- (Slovenia) Anej Lovrečič
- (Slovenia) Dejan Milič
- (Spain) Jorge Giménez
- (Ukraine) Yevhen Novak
- (United States) (Mexico) Cesar Romero
