= 2013–14 FK Vardar season =

Vardar
2013–14 season
- Owner: Sergei Samsonenko
- Chairman: Zoran Shishkovski; Mirko Spaseski
- Manager: Blagoja Milevski; Sergey Andreyev
- Stadium: Philip II Arena
- First League: 5th
- Macedonian Cup: Second Round
- Super Cup: Winners
- Champions League: Second Qualifying Round
- Top goalscorer: League: Filip Petrov; Aco Stojkov (9); All: Filip Petrov (11)
- Highest home attendance: 4,000 vs Pelister; 9 March 2014
- Lowest home attendance: 50 vs Renova; 18 August 2013
Home colours	Away colours

The 2013–14 season was FK Vardar's 22nd consecutive season in First League. This article shows player statistics and all official matches that the club was played during the 2013–14 season.

In the winter break of the season, Vardar was faced a major ownership changes. Russian businessman and an owner of ŽRK Vardar and RK Vardar Sergei Samsonenko takes over the football club, with an ambitious plans to enter a group stage of UEFA Champions League.

== Squad ==
As of 10 February 2014

Note: Flags indicate national team as defined under FIFA eligibility rules; some limited exceptions apply. Players may hold more than one non-FIFA nationality.

No.	Pos.	Nation	Player
1	GK	MNE	Igor Pavlović
12	GK	MKD	Kostadin Zahov
25	GK	MKD	Borjan Ristovski
3	DF	MKD	Vladimir Dimitrovski
4	DF	SRB	Radenko Bojović (captain)
5	DF	MKD	Zlatko Tanevski
11	DF	SRB	Aleksandar Trninić
18	DF	MNE	Stevan Reljić
21	DF	MKD	Stojan Stojchevski
26	DF	MKD	Mite Cikarski
29	DF	MKD	Dimitrija Lazarevski
6	MF	MKD	Jasir Asani
7	MF	MKD	Martin Blazhevski
8	MF	MKD	Zharko Simjanoski

No.	Pos.	Nation	Player
14	MF	SLO	Anej Lovrečič
15	MF	MKD	Mirko Simjanoski
16	MF	MKD	Filip Janevski
17	MF	MKD	Dimitar Ivanov
19	MF	MKD	Miroslav Jovanoski
20	MF	MKD	Andrej Acevski
23	MF	MKD	Filip Despotovski
24	MF	MKD	Aleksandar Temelkov
87	MF	MKD	Vlatko Grozdanoski
9	FW	MKD	Antonio Bujchevski
10	FW	MKD	Dragan Georgiev
13	FW	MKD	Filip Petrov
22	FW	MKD	Filip Ivanovski
50	FW	MKD	Ilcho Naumoski

=== Left club during season ===
Note: Flags indicate national team as defined under FIFA eligibility rules; some limited exceptions apply. Players may hold more than one non-FIFA nationality.

No.	Pos.	Nation	Player
6	MF	SRB	Aleksandar Petrović (released)
7	MF	BIH	Edin Ademović (released)
14	MF	MKD	Robert Mitev (loaned to FK Tiverija)

No.	Pos.	Nation	Player
17	FW	MKD	Aco Stojkov (to FC Botoșani)
20	MF	ESP	Jorge Giménez (to Reus Deportiu)
23	FW	MKD	Jovan Kostovski (to OH Leuven)

== Competitions ==
=== Supercup ===
28 July 2013 Final	Vardar	1–0	Teteks	Skopje
20:00	Petrov 54'	Report		Stadium: Philip II Arena; Attendance: 100; Referee: Dimitar Mechkarovski (Skopje)

=== First League ===
==== League table ====
Pos	Team	Pld	W	D	L	GF	GA	GD	Pts	Qualification or relegation
3	Metalurg	33	16	11	6	48	29	+19	59	Qualification to Europa League first qualifying round (Note: Metalurg qualified for the Europa League first qualifying round as a runner-up of the 2013–14 Macedonian Football Cup.)
4	Shkëndija	33	16	9	8	53	32	+21	57	Qualification to Europa League first qualifying round
5	Vardar	33	15	11	7	55	32	+23	56	
6	Pelister	33	14	10	9	40	40	0	52	
7	Bregalnica Shtip	33	11	11	11	34	34	0	44	

Source: MacedonianFootball.com
Rules for classification: 1) Points; 2) Goal difference; 3) Goals scored; 4) Head-to-head points; 5) Head-to-head goal difference; 6) Head-to-head away goals scored (only if two teams); 7) Head-to-head goals scored; 8) Draw; 9) Play-off. (Note: Criteria 2, 3 and 8 is only used if not deciding Champion, teams for UEFA competitions or relegation).

==== Results summary ====
Overall								Home						Away					
Pld	W	D	L	GF	GA	GD	Pts	W	D	L	GF	GA	GD	W	D	L	GF	GA	GD
33	15	11	7	55	32	+23	56	10	6	1	36	9	+27	5	5	6	19	23	−4

==== Results by round ====
Round	1	2	3	4	5	6	7	8	9	10	11	12	13	14	15	16	17	18	19	20	21	22	23	24	25	26	27	28	29	30	31	32	33
Ground	H	A	H	A	H	A	H	A	H	A	H	A	H	A	H	A	H	A	H	A	H	A	H	A	H	A	H	A	H	H	A	H	A
Result	W	D	D	L	W	L	W	L	W	W	D	W	W	D	D	D	W	W	D	W	D	L	L	D	W	W	W	L	D	W	L	W	D
Position	1	4	5	5	3	6	6	6	5	2	2	1	1	1	2	2	1	1	2	1	1	3	4	5	3	3	2	5	5	4	4	5	5

Source: Competitive Matches
A = Away; H = Home; W = Win; D = Draw; L = Loss

==== Matches ====
4 August 2013 1	Vardar	4–1	Makedonija GjP	Skopje
20:00	Bojović 8'; Kostovski 35', 72', 80'	Report	Adem 40' (pen.)	Stadium: Philip II Arena; Attendance: 300; Referee: Dejan Jakimovski (Skopje)

11 August 2013 2	Gorno Lisiche	2–2	Vardar	Skopje
17:30	Ilovski 13'; Todorovski 74' (pen.); Kostencoski (yellow card) 0' (red card) 53'	Report	Giménez 35'; Stojkov 48'; Bojović (yellow card) 0' (red card) 43'	Stadium: Stadion Boris Trajkovski; Attendance: 150; Referee: Dimitar Mechkarovski (Skopje)

18 August 2013 3	Vardar	1–1	Renova	Skopje
20:00	Kostovski 39'	Report	Emini 35'	Stadium: Philip II Arena; Attendance: 50; Referee: Marjan Markoski (Ohrid)

25 August 2013 4	Horizont Turnovo	2–0	Vardar	Turnovo
17:00	Naumchevski 62'; Blazhevski 66'	Report		Stadium: Stadion Kukush; Attendance: 3,000; Referee: Aleksandar Stavrev (Skopje)

28 August 2013 5	Vardar	1–0	Bregalnica Shtip	Skopje
17:00	Ademović 16'; Jovanoski (yellow card) 0' (yellow-red card) 87'	Report		Stadium: Philip II Arena; Attendance: 300; Referee: Josip Barton (Tetovo)

1 September 2013 6	Metalurg Skopje	3–0	Vardar	Skopje
16:30	Radeski 20'; Krstev 89'; Ljamchevski (yellow card) 0' (yellow-red card) 48'	Report	Bujchevski 43'; Stojkov 78'	Stadium: Stadion Zhelezarnica; Attendance: 1,000; Referee: Dimitar Mechkarovski (Skopje)
Note: Match was originally finished 2–2, but was awarded 3–0 by FA decision.

15 September 2013 7	Vardar	4–0	Gostivar	Skopje
19:30	Stojkov 27', 89' (pen.); Ademović 68', 83'	Report		Stadium: Philip II Arena; Attendance: 100; Referee: Stevche Shuleski (Ohrid)

22 September 2013 8	Shkëndija	3–1	Vardar	Tetovo
15:30	Selmani 5'; Nexhipi 9'; Nuhiu 57'	Report	Ademović 89'	Stadium: Gradski stadion Attendance: 8,000; Referee: Aleksandar Stavrev (Skopje)

29 September 2013 9	Vardar	3–0	Napredok	Skopje
15:30	Stojkov 2'; Ademović 14'; Petrov 62'	Report		Stadium: Stadion Zhelezarnica; Attendance: 300; Referee: Dalibor Gjorgjevski (Kumanovo)

6 October 2013 10	Pelister	1–2	Vardar	Bitola
15:00	Júnior 11'	Report	Ademović 18'; Stojkov 69'	Stadium: Stadion Tumbe Kafe; Attendance: 7,000; Referee: Aleksandar Stavrev (Skopje)

19 October 2013 11	Vardar	1–1	Rabotnichki	Skopje
14:00	Ademović 29' (pen.)	Report	Manevski 4'	Stadium: Stadion Zhelezarnica; Attendance: 200; Referee: Aleksandar Stavrev (Skopje)

27 October 2013 12	Makedonija GjP	1–3	Vardar	Skopje
13:00	Jančevski 10'	Report	Stojkov 72'; Petrov 88'; Grozdanoski 89'	Stadium: Stadion Gjorche Petrov; Attendance: 500; Referee: Dimitar Mechkarovski (Skopje)

30 October 2013 13	Vardar	2–0	Gorno Lisiche	Ohrid
13:00	Reljić 53'; Stojkov 62'	Report		Stadium: SRC Biljanini Izvori; Attendance: 200; Referee: Josip Barton (Tetovo)

3 November 2013 14	Renova	0–0	Vardar	Tetovo
13:00		Report		Stadium: Gradski stadion Attendance: 600; Referee: Marjan Markoski (Ohrid)

10 November 2013 15	Vardar	1–1	Horizont Turnovo	Ohrid
13:00	Grozdanoski 23'	Report	Ejupi 84'	Stadium: SRC Biljanini Izvori; Attendance: 300; Referee: Dimitar Mechkarovski (Skopje)

24 November 2013 16	Bregalnica Shtip	1–1	Vardar	Shtip
13:00	Velkovski 34'	Report	Stojkov 15'	Stadium: Gradski stadion Attendance: 2,000; Referee: Aleksandar Stavrev (Skopje)

27 November 2013 17	Vardar	3–0	Metalurg Skopje	Skopje
17:00	Tanevski 2'; Stojkov 12' (pen.); Petrov 40'	Report		Stadium: Philip II Arena; Attendance: 110; Referee: Aleksandar Stavrev (Skopje)

3 December 2013 18	Gostivar	1–2	Vardar	Ohrid
16:00	Seferi 45' (pen.)	Report	Petrov 34'; Petrović 67'	Stadium: SRC Biljanini Izvori; Attendance: 200; Referee: Goran Spirkoski (Prilep)

8 December 2013 19	Vardar	0–0	Shkëndija	Skopje
17:00		Report		Stadium: Philip II Arena; Attendance: 500; Referee: Dejan Jakimovski (Skopje)

1 March 2014 20	Napredok	0–1	Vardar	Kichevo
14:00	Veljanovski (red card) 44'	Report	Naumoski 45+1'	Stadium: Gradski stadion Attendance: 2,000; Referee: Josip Barton (Tetovo)

9 March 2014 21	Vardar	1–1	Pelister	Skopje
16:00	Naumoski 41' (pen.); Cikarski (red card) 52'	Report	Ljamchevski 5'	Stadium: Philip II Arena; Attendance: 4,000; Referee: Dimitar Mechkarovski (Skopje)

15 March 2014 22	Rabotnichki	2–1	Vardar	Skopje
14:00	Manevski 45+2'; Ilijoski 54'	Report	Asani 37'	Stadium: Philip II Arena; Attendance: 500; Referee: Aleksandar Stavrev (Skopje)

23 March 2014 23	Vardar	1–2	Shkëndija	Skopje
16:00	Petrov 69'	Report	Miliev 23'; Júnior 73'	Stadium: Philip II Arena; Attendance: 700; Referee: Dimitar Mechkarovski (Skopje)

26 March 2014 24	Makedonija GjP	2–2	Vardar	Skopje
15:00	Adem 6' (pen.); Janchevski 39'	Report	Petrov 1'; Asani 4'	Stadium: Stadion Gjorche Petrov; Attendance: 400; Referee: Stevche Shuleski (Ohrid)

30 March 2014 25	Vardar	6–0	Napredok	Skopje
16:00	Despotovski 21', 44'; Bujchevski 26'; Asani 39', 41', 62'	Report		Stadium: Philip II Arena; Attendance: 100; Referee: Faton Mustafi (Tetovo)

5 April 2014 26	Gostivar	0–2	Vardar	Gostivar
16:00		Report	Petrov 68'; Ivanovski 78'	Stadium: Gradski stadion Attendance: 400; Referee: Dimitar Mechkarovski (Skopje)

12 April 2014 27	Vardar	5–1	Renova	Skopje
20:00	Asani 17', 53'; Petrov (yellow card) 0' (yellow-red card) 25'; Lazarevski 37'; Tanevski 49'; Grozdanoski 72'	Report	Musliu (red card) 1'; Gafuri 29'	Stadium: Philip II Arena; Attendance: 400; Referee: Dimitar Mechkarovski (Skopje)

20 April 2014 28	Metalurg Skopje	2–1	Vardar	Skopje
15:00	Mitrevski 41'; Dalcheski 90+2'	Report	Ivanovski 90+4' (pen.)	Stadium: Stadion Zhelezarnica; Attendance: 300; Referee: Marjan Eckoski (Ohrid)

23 April 2014 29	Vardar	0–0	Pelister	Skopje
18:00		Report		Stadium: Philip II Arena; Attendance: 2,000; Referee: Stevche Shuleski (Ohrid)

26 April 2014 30	Vardar	1–0	Gorno Lisiche	Skopje
14:00	Despotovski 65'	Report	Abdula (yellow card) 0' (yellow-red card) 83'	Stadium: Philip II Arena; Attendance: 400; Referee: Dimitar Mechkarovski (Skopje)

4 May 2014 31	Rabotnichki	3–1	Vardar	Skopje
15:00	Manevski 38', 45'; Todorovski 81'	Report	Petrov 70'	Stadium: Philip II Arena; Attendance: 700; Referee: Goran Spirkoski (Prilep)

11 May 2014 32	Vardar	2–1	Horizont Turnovo	Skopje
16:00	Petrov 39'; Ivanovski 70'	Report	Churlinov 57'	Stadium: Philip II Arena; Attendance: 400; Referee: Marjan Eckoski (Ohrid)

18 May 2014 33	Bregalnica Štip	0–0	Vardar	Shtip
16:30		Report		Stadium: Gradski stadion Attendance: 3,000; Referee: Dimitar Mechkarovski (Skopje)

=== Macedonian Cup ===
==== First round ====
21 August 2013	Zajazi	2–4	Vardar	Kichevo
17:00	Osmani 6'; I. Ismaili 26'	Report	Petrov 15'; Ademović 18', 30' (pen.); Bojović 62'	Stadium: Gradski stadion Attendance: 200; Referee: Zorancho Temelkov (Kavadarci)

==== Second round ====
18 September 2013 First leg	Metalurg Skopje	1–0	Vardar	Skopje
16:00	Vujović 3'	Report		Stadium: Stadion Zhelezarnica; Attendance: 300; Referee: Aleksandar Stavrev (Skopje)

25 September 2013 Second leg	Vardar	2–1 (2–2a agg.)	Metalurg Skopje	Ohrid
15:30	Stojkov 15'; Ademović 31'	Report	Peev 9'	Stadium: SRC Biljanini Izvori; Attendance: 200; Referee: Aleksandar Stavrev (Skopje)

=== UEFA Champions League ===
==== Second qualifying round ====
16 July 2013 First leg	Steaua București (Romania)	3–0	(North Macedonia) Vardar	Bucharest
19:45	Tănase 12'; Pintilii 21'; Pavlović 45+2' (o.g.)	Report		Stadium: Arena Națională; Attendance: 36,433; Referee: Radek Příhoda (Czech Republic)

23 July 2013 Second leg	Vardar (North Macedonia)	1–2 (1–5 agg.)	(Romania) Steaua București	Skopje
20:45	Kostovski 45+1'	Report	Piovaccari 23'; Bourceanu 72'	Stadium: Philip II Arena; Attendance: 3,450; Referee: Oleksandr Derdo (Ukraine)

== Statistics ==
=== Top scorers ===
Rank	Name	League	Europe	Cup	Supercup	Total
1	(North Macedonia) Filip Petrov	9	–	1	1	11
2	(Bosnia and Herzegovina) Edin Ademović	7	–	3	–	10
2	(North Macedonia) Aco Stojkov	9	–	1	–	10
4	(North Macedonia) Jasir Asani	7	–	–	–	7
5	(North Macedonia) Jovan Kostovski	4	1	–	–	5
6	(North Macedonia) Filip Despotovski	3	–	–	–	3
6	(North Macedonia) Vlatko Grozdanoski	3	–	–	–	3
6	(North Macedonia) Filip Ivanovski	3	–	–	–	3
9	(Serbia) Radenko Bojović	1	–	1	–	2
9	(North Macedonia) Ilcho Naumoski	2	–	–	–	2
11	(North Macedonia) Antonio Bujchevski	1	–	–	–	1
11	(Spain) Jorge Giménez	1	–	–	–	1
11	(North Macedonia) Dimitrija Lazarevski	1	–	–	–	1
11	(Serbia) Aleksandar Petrović	1	–	–	–	1
11	(North Macedonia) Zlatko Tanevski	1	–	–	–	1
	TOTALS	55	1	6	1	63
