= Veljanovski =

Veljanovski (Macedonian: Вељановски) is a Macedonian surname. Notable people with the surname include:

- Aleksandar Veljanovski (footballer born 1984) (born 1984), Swiss footballer
- Trajko Veljanovski (born 1962), Macedonian politician
