= Sejdini =

Sejdini is an Albanian surname. Notable people with the surname include:

- Faruk Sejdini (born 1950), Albanian football player and coach
- Muamed Sejdini (born 1969), member of FIFA and UEFA administrators in football
- Qazim Sejdini (1951–2024), Albanian politician
- Trejsi Sejdini (born 2000), Albanian model, Miss Universe Albania 2018
