= Predrag Ranđelović =

Predrag Ranđelović may refer to:

- Predrag Ranđelović (footballer, born 1976), Serbian footballer
- Predrag Ranđelović (footballer, born 1990), Serbian-born Macedonia footballer
