= Ljubisavljević =

Ljubisavljević is a surname. Notable people with the surname include:

- Dragan Ljubisavljević (born 1979), Serbian footballer
- Nemanja Ljubisavljević (born 1996), Serbian footballer
- Veruska Ljubisavljević (born 1991), Venezuelan model and beauty pageant titleholder
