= Filip Despotovski =

Macedonian football midfielder

Personal information
- Full name: Filip Despotovski
- Date of birth: 18 November 1982 (age 43)
- Place of birth: Skopje, SR Macedonia, Yugoslavia
- Height: 1.83 m (6 ft 0 in)
- Position: Defensive midfielder

Senior career*
Years	Team	Apps	(Gls)
2001–2002	Cementarnica	19	(4)
2002–2003	OFK Beograd	20	(1)
2003–2004	Napredok	6	(1)
2004	Vardar	1	(0)
2004–2005	Bežanija	11	(2)
2005–2006	Mačva Šabac	14	(3)
2006–2007	Ethnikos Piraeus	18	(0)
2007–2008	Vardar	15	(0)
2008–2010	Vorskla Poltava	48	(2)
2010–2011	Inter Baku	12	(1)
2011–2012	Rabotnički	20	(2)
2012–2013	Pierikos	12	(0)
2013	Teteks	11	(0)
2013–2015	Vardar	52	(3)
2015	Teteks	14	(1)
2016	Akademija Pandev		
2017–2018	Gostivar	8	(2)

International career^{‡}
2009–2012	Macedonia	18	(0)
- * Club domestic league appearances and goals as of 15 September 2013 ‡ National team caps and goals as of 29 February 2012

Filip Despotovski (Macedonian: Филип Дecпoтoвcки; born 18 November 1982 in Skopje) is a Macedonian football midfielder who plays for Gostivar.

== Professional career ==
=== Early career ===
Filip Despotovski started his career in Macedonia in FK Vardar's youth school, SSK Mladinec, but would sign his first professional contract with Cementarnica 55.

In his first professional season, Despotovski made 19 appearances and scored 4 goals for Cementarnica 55, which immediately earned him a transfer to prominent Serbian club OFK Beograd in summer 2002.

In his first season with OFK, Despotovski made 17 appearances and scored 1 goal to help the team to a third-place league finish. The following season though, Despotovski was no longer a starter, and he would move on from the club. Over the next two-and-a-half seasons, Despotovski played for Macedonian club Napredok Kičevo and Serbian clubs FK Bežanija and Mačva Šabac.

=== Ethnikos and Vardar ===
In 2006, Despotovski landed in Greece with Beta Ethniki club Ethnikos Piraeus, and the move proved to be a turning point in his career. After one season with Ethnikos, FK Vardar, Macedonia's most prominent club, took notice of Despotovski's impressive form and signed him to a contract in summer 2007.

Despotovski's rapid growth as a player continued at Vardar, and as such he did not remain at the club very long. Despotovski was noted as Vardar's best player in the first half of the 2007–08 season, and during the winter transfer period Ukrainian Premier League club Vorskla Poltava stepped in and acquired his services from Vardar.

=== FK Vorskla ===
In Despotovski's first full season with Vorskla, the team won the Ukrainian Cup for the first time in club history; Despotovski played all 90 minutes in Vorskla's 1–0 defeat of FC Shakhtar Donetsk in the Cup Final. The Cup victory earned Despotovski the distinction of being the fifth Macedonian international to win a Cup title, after Goran Pandev, Goran Popov, Zlatko Tanevski and Artim Sakiri. In league play, Despotovski made 25 appearances and scored 1 goal; Vorskla went undefeated in his first league 16 appearances.

On 20 August 2009, Despotovski made his first appearance in European competition when Vorskla took on Primeira Liga club Benfica in the play-off round of the 2009–10 UEFA Europa League. Despotovski appeared in the second leg of the tie against Benfica as well; the Portuguese team would advance with a 5-2 aggregate victory. In league play, Despotovski made 14 appearances and scored 1 goal in 2009–10.

=== FC Inter Baku ===
Despotovski signed a 1-year deal with Inter Baku on 30 August 2010.

== International career ==
=== 2010 FIFA World Cup qualification ===
On 6 June 2009, Despotovski made his debut for the Macedonian National Team against Norway in 2010 FIFA World Cup qualification (UEFA Group 9); the Norway match was Macedonia's fifth of their eight total qualifying matches. Following his debut, Despotovski made two more appearances—both starts—in Group 9 qualification, against Iceland and Scotland.

=== UEFA Euro 2012 qualification ===
As of June 2011, Despotovski has made five appearances (four starts) for Macedonia in UEFA Euro 2012 qualifying (Group B).

=== Other ===
In 2009, Despotovski played for Macedonia in friendly matches against Spain, Qatar, Canada and Iran.

In 2010, Despotovski played for Macedonia in friendly matches against Montenegro, Azerbaijan, Romania, and Malta.

In 2011, Despotovski has played for Macedonia in a friendly match against Cameroon.

== Honors ==
=== FK Vorskla ===
- Ukrainian Cup: 2008–09
