= Haralampie Hadži-Risteski =

Former president of the Football Federation of Macedonia

Haralampie "Hari" Hadži-Risteski (Macedonian: Харалампие Хаџи-Ристески) was a president of the Football Federation of Macedonia.

A former president of FK Pobeda, he was elected president of the Macedonian Football Union in 2002, beating former player Darko Pančev in the votings. He was replaced by former Vardar coach Ilčo Gjorgjioski in 2012.

Preceded by Lambe Arnaudov	President of Football Federation of Macedonia; September 2002 – July 2012	Succeeded by Ilčo Gjorgioski
