= Mirko Petrov =

Macedonian footballer (born 1956)

Personal information
- Date of birth: 1 November 1956 (age 69)
- Place of birth: Skopje, FPR Yugoslavia
- Position: Forward

Senior career*
Years	Team	Apps	(Gls)
1977–1978	Rabotnički	30	(6)
1978–1981	Teteks	81	(15)
1981–1983	Hajduk	4	(0)
1983–1985	Pelister	69	(41)
1985–1987	Vardar	45	(10)
1987–1988	Real Burgos	28	(11)
1988	Vardar	12	(1)
1988–1989	Real Burgos	19	(1)
Total		288	(85)
- * Club domestic league appearances and goals

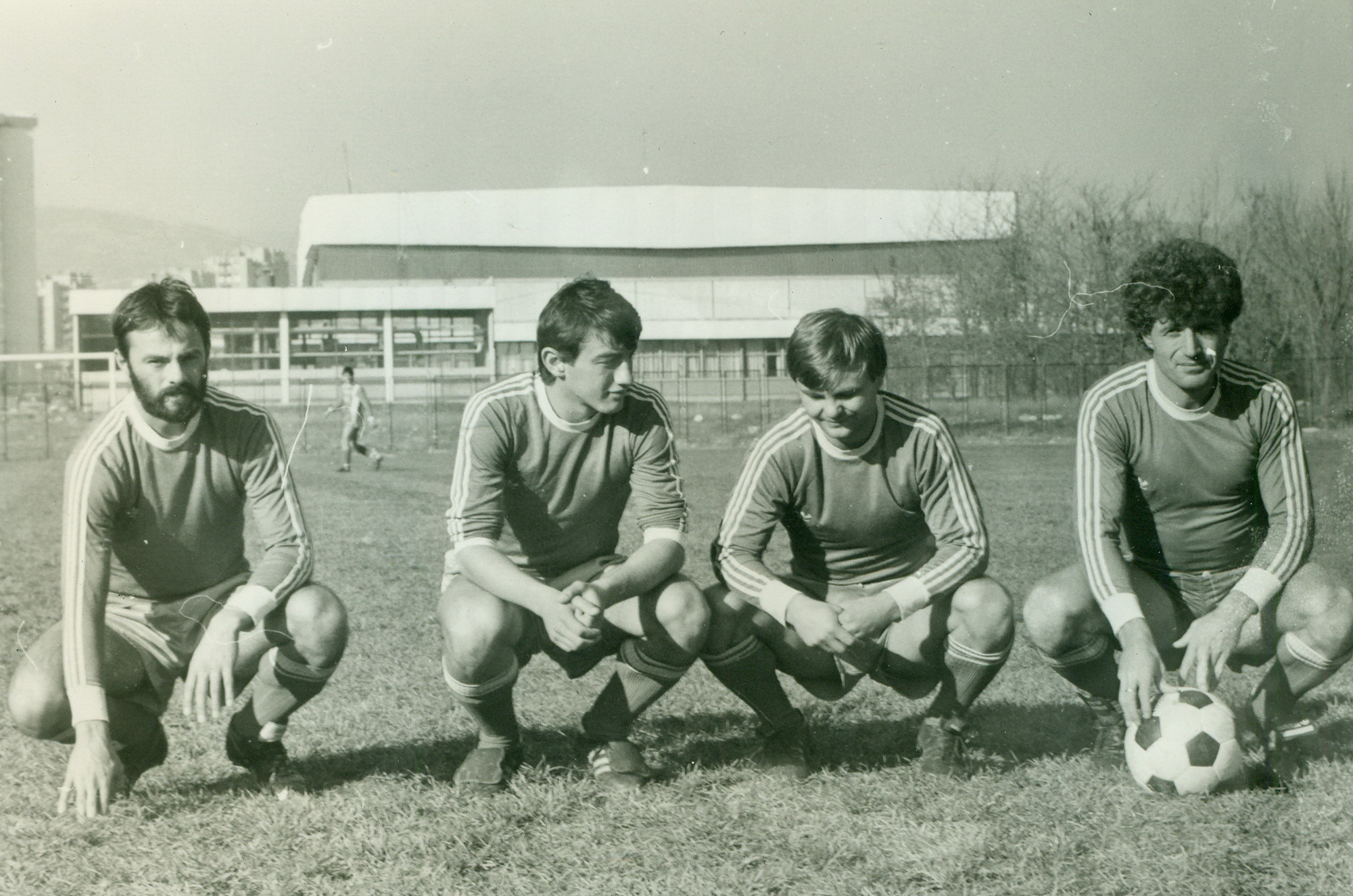
The players of FC Pelister (season 1984/85): Dragan Banković, Nedžat Husein, Branko Božić and Mirko Petrov, the "Tumbekafe" stadium, Bitola

Mirko Petrov (Macedonian: Мирко Петров; born 1 November 1956) is a Macedonian former professional footballer who played as a forward.

== Career ==
After playing for Macedonian second tier clubs Rabotnički and Teteks, Mirko Petrov joined renowned Yugoslav First League team Hajduk. But, his two year stay in this team was marked with low number of caps. In his first season, he played one single match in national championship (against Velež Mostar) after which he was suspended for entire season because he wasn't properly registered for Hajduk. Also, during that season he played in UEFA Cup match against Valencia. Upon leaving Hajduk, he became important part of teams Pelister and Vardar. With latter one, he won Yugoslav Championship in 1987, before the title was given to FK Partizan after their six points deduction was reversed. He also set abroad to play season and a half for Spanish second tier side Real Burgos.

== Personal life ==
His son is footballer Filip Petrov.
