= Petar Miloševski =

Macedonian footballer

Personal information
- Full name: Petar Miloševski
- Date of birth: 6 December 1973
- Place of birth: Bitola, SR Macedonia, SFR Yugoslavia
- Date of death: 13 March 2014 (aged 40)
- Place of death: Kumanovo, Macedonia (now North Macedonia)
- Height: 1.88 m (6 ft 2 in)
- Position: Goalkeeper

Senior career*
Years	Team	Apps	(Gls)
1989–1994	Pelister		
1994–1998	Vardar	43	(0)
1998–2001	Trabzonspor	60	(0)
2001–2004	Malatyaspor	62	(0)
2004–2005	Sebatspor	12	(0)
2005–2012	Enosis Neon Paralimni	131	(0)

International career^{‡}
1998–2009	Macedonia	59	(0)
- * Club domestic league appearances and goals ‡ National team caps and goals as of 7 May 2012

Petar Miloševski (Macedonian: Петар Милошевски; 6 December 1973 – 13 March 2014) was a Macedonian footballer who played as a goalkeeper.

== International career ==
He made his senior debut for Macedonia in a March 1998 friendly match against Bulgaria and has earned a total of 59 caps, scoring no goals. His final international was a February 2009 friendly against Moldova.

== Personal life ==
Miloševski was appointed sporting director of the Macedonia national team shortly after he ended his 22-year playing career.

=== Death ===
He died in a car accident near Kumanovo on 13 March 2014, after taking part in a charity futsal match there. Reportedly the car, which was driven by Macedonian Football Federation President Ilčo Gjorgioski, collided with a van from the opposite direction for unknown reasons on the Kriva Palanka-Kumanovo road. Gjorgioski and an unknown person came out injured.
