= Muamed Sejdini =

UEFA and football administrator

President of Football Federation of Macedonia
- In office 2018 (as acting) till 13 March 2019 – 15 March 2025
- Preceded by: Ilcho Gjorgjioski
- Succeeded by: Masar Omeragić

Personal details
- Born: 25 November 1969
- Occupation: Football administrator

Muamed Sejdini (born 25 November 1969) is a member of FIFA and UEFA administrators in football who is the former president of Football Federation of Macedonia.

Whilst in office he previously served as vice president in 2014 to 2018 and was acting president for eight months in 2018 when president Ilcho Gjorgjioski stepped down.

== Notes ==
Preceded by Ilčo Gjorgioski	President of Football Federation of North Macedonia; March 2019 – March 2025	Succeeded by Masar Omeragić
