= Lico (footballer, born 1984) =

Brazilian footballer

Personal information
- Full name: Paulo Cândido Serafim da Cruz
- Date of birth: 26 December 1984 (age 41)
- Place of birth: São Caetano do Sul, Brazil
- Height: 1.75 m (5 ft 9 in)
- Positions: Forward; winger

Team information
- Current team: Valletta F.C.

Senior career*
Years	Team	Apps	(Gls)
2005	Democrata	?	(?)
2005–2006	América Mineiro	?	(?)
2006	Valeriodoce	?	(?)
2006–2008	Valdevez	31	(3)
2008–2010	Santa Clara	33	(2)
2010–2011	Moreirense	22	(2)
2012–2013	FK Vardar	23	(3)
2014–	Valletta F.C.	0	(0)
- * Club domestic league appearances and goals

Paulo Cândido Serafim da Cruz, commonly known as Lico, (born 26 December 1984) is a Brazilian football striker who currently Plays with Valletta F.C.

After playing with Esporte Clube Democrata, América Mineiro and Valeriodoce Esporte Clube in Brazil, he moved to Portugal in 2006, where after playing with Atlético Vadevez has played in the Portuguese Liga de Honra for C.D. Santa Clara and Moreirense F.C. In summer 2011 he signed with Macedonian side FK Vardar.

== Achievements ==
- FK Vardar
  - First Macedonian Football League: 1
    - Winner: 2011-12
