= Dragan Ljubisavljević =

Serbian footballer

Personal information
- Date of birth: December 22, 1979 (age 46)
- Place of birth: Kraljevo, Serbia
- Height: 1.77 m (5 ft 10 in)
- Positions: Defender; midfielder

Senior career*
Years	Team	Apps	(Gls)
1999–2001	Radnički Niš	8+	(1+)
2001–2005	Obilić	46+	(2+)
2005–2007	Makedonija GP	39	(1)
2007–2008	Voždovac		
2008–2009	Vardar	16	(0)
2010	Radnički Kragujevac		
2010–2012	Zeyar Shwe Myay	9	(0)
2012	Mitra Kukar	12	(0)
- * Club domestic league appearances and goals as of 6 November 2012 (UTC)

Dragan Ljubisavljević (born on December 22, 1979, in Kraljevo, Serbia) is a Serbian retired footballer who plays as a defender.
