= Ilčo Gjorgioski =

Retired Footballer and administrator

Personal information
- Full name: Ilija Gjorgioski
- Date of birth: 11 December 1971 (age 54)
- Place of birth: Skopje, SR Macedonia, SFR Yugoslavia
- Height: 1.88 m (6 ft 2 in)
- Position: Midfielder

Youth career
- Makedonija Gjorče Petrov

Senior career*
Years	Team	Apps	(Gls)
- Makedonija Gjorče Petrov
1995–1999	Vardar		
1999–2000	Denizlispor	8	(1)
2000-2001	Bnei Yehuda Tel Aviv	18	(0)
2002–2003	Sloga Jugomagnat	2	(0)
Total		32	(1)

International career
1997	Macedonia	1	(0)

Managerial career
- 2002–2005: Makedonija Gjorče Petrov (youth)
- 2005–2007: Macedonia U19
- 2007–2010: Makedonija Gjorče Petrov
- 2010: Vardar
- 2011–2012: Vardar
- 2012–2018: FFM (president)
- 2022: Bregalnica Štip
- 2023: Kalamata
- * Club domestic league appearances and goals

Ilija "Ilčo" Gjorgjioski (Macedonian: Илчо Ѓорѓиоски; born 11 December 1971) is a Macedonian football manager and former player who played as a midfielder.

== President of Football Federation of Macedonia ==
In 2012 Gjorgjioski was appointment position of President of FFM.

== Death of Petar Miloševski ==
Former national team goalkeeper Petar Miloševski died in a car accident near Kumanovo on 13 March 2014 after taking part in a charity futsal match there. Reportedly the car in which he was travelling was driven by Gjorgioski and collided with a van from the opposite direction for unknown reasons on the Kriva Palanka-Kumanovo road. Gjorgioski and an unknown person came out injured.

== Honours ==
=== Coach ===
Makedonija Gjorče Petrov

- Macedonian First Football League: 2008–09

Vardar

- Macedonian First Football League: 2011–12

Preceded by Haralampie Hadži-Risteski	President of Football Federation of North Macedonia; July 2012 – May 2018	Succeeded by Muamed Sejdini
