= Aleksandar Veljanovski =

Swiss footballer (born 1984)

Alex Veljanovski
Personal information
- Date of birth: 11 January 1984 (age 42)
- Place of birth: Switzerland
- Height: 1.83 m (6 ft 0 in)
- Position: Midfielder

Senior career*
Years	Team	Apps	(Gls)
–2003	FC Baden		
2003–2004	Napredok Kičevo		
2004–2005	FC Wangen bei Olten		
2006–2009	FC Solothurn	44	(2)
2009	FC Gossau	1	(0)
2010–2011	SC Zofingen	43	(1)
2011–2012	FC Grenchen	18	(0)
2012–2014	SC Zofingen	41	(2)
- * Club domestic league appearances and goals

Aleksandar Veljanovski (born 11 January 1984) is a retired Swiss football midfielder.

He previously played with Macedonian club FK Napredok, and Swiss clubs FC BadenFC Wangen bei Olten, FC Solothurn, FC Gossau and SC Zofingen.

Alex is of Macedonian descent.

== External sources ==
- Aleksandar Veljanovski at WorldFootball.net
