= Edin Ademović =

Serbian–Bosnian footballer

Personal information
- Full name: Edin Ademović
- Date of birth: October 2, 1987 (age 39)
- Place of birth: Belgrade, SFR Yugoslavia
- Height: 1.90 m (6 ft 3 in)
- Position: Striker

Youth career
- Partizan

Senior career*
Years	Team	Apps	(Gls)
2005–2006	FK Sarajevo	0	(0)
2006–2008	Kolubara	40	(16)
2008	Kasımpaşa	6	(0)
2008	Belasitsa Petrich	15	(0)
2009	Giresunspor	6	(0)
2009–2011	Sloboda Sevojno	36	(8)
2011–2012	Novi Pazar	23	(1)
2012–2013	FK Sarajevo	5	(0)
2013	BSK Borča	13	(2)
2013–2014	Vardar	9	(7)
2017	Radnik Bijeljina	9	(0)
- * Club domestic league appearances and goals as of 18 November 2017

Edin Ademović (born 2 October 1987) is a Serbian–Bosnian footballer who most recently played for FK Radnik Bijeljina.

== Club career ==
Born in the Serbian capital Belgrade, he started his youth-career at local power-house FK Partizan. He begin his senior career at Bosnian club FK Sarajevo, and since then he played with Serbian FK Kolubara, Turkish Kasimpasa SK, Bulgarian A PFG Belasitsa Petrich and Turkish Second League Giresunspor. After he played for Giresunspor he moved back to Serbia and played in Serbian First League in FK Sevojno. 2010 he debuted in Serbian SuperLiga with Sloboda Sevojno.

In December 2016 he signed a two-year contract with Bosnian side FK Radnik Bijeljina.

== Honours ==
Vardar

- Macedonian Super Cup: 2013
