= Dejan Milić =

Slovenian footballer (born 1984)

Personal information
- Full name: Dejan Milić
- Date of birth: 24 January 1984 (age 42)
- Place of birth: Ljubljana, SFR Yugoslavia
- Height: 1.93 m (6 ft 4 in)
- Position: Goalkeeper

Youth career
- –2003: Svoboda

Senior career*
Years	Team	Apps	(Gls)
2002–2003	Svoboda	4	(0)
2003–2004	Bled	25	(0)
2004	Svoboda	10	(0)
2005	Krka	1	(0)
2006	Ihan	25	(0)
2007	Gorica	0	(0)
2007–2009	Bela Krajina	35	(0)
2009–2010	Primorje	42	(1)
2010–2012	Nea Salamis	16	(0)
2013	Vardar	10	(0)
2014–2019	Domžale	47	(0)
2020–2022	Dob	0	(0)
- * Club domestic league appearances and goals

Dejan Milić (born 24 January 1984) is a Slovenian retired football goalkeeper. Besides Slovenia, he has played in Cyprus and North Macedonia.
