= Borche Manevski =

Macedonian football player (born 1985)

Borče Manevski
Personal information
- Full name: Borče Manevski
- Date of birth: 5 July 1985 (age 41)
- Place of birth: Bitola, SFR Yugoslavia
- Height: 1.77 m (5 ft 9 1/2 in)
- Positions: Striker; left winger

Senior career*
Years	Team	Apps	(Gls)
2003–2004	Pelister		
2004–2005	Pobeda	37	(11)
2006–2007	Górnik Łęczna	25	(0)
2007	Pobeda	11	(2)
2008	Milano	20	(7)
2009–2010	Banat Zrenjanin	17	(1)
2010–2012	Rabotnički	56	(36)
2012–2013	Vardar	26	(7)
2013–2014	Rabotnički	28	(17)
2014–2016	Chainat Hornbill	11	(1)
2015	→ Trat (loan)	19	(9)
2016	Rabotnički	2	(1)
2016	Balzan	0	(0)
2017	Pembroke Athleta	11	(1)
2017	Pobeda	16	(3)
2018	Pelister	12	(4)
2018–2019	Ballkani	19	(5)
2019–2024	Pelister		

International career
2002	Macedonia U17	3	(0)
2003	Macedonia U19	2	(0)
2005	Macedonia U21	9	(0)
2008–2014	Macedonia	8	(0)
- * Club domestic league appearances and goals

Borče Manevski (Macedonian: Борче Маневски, born 5 July 1985) is a Macedonian former professional footballer who played as a striker or left winger.

== Club career ==
Born in Bitola, his career started in local FK Pelister in 2004. In January 2006, he moved to Poland to play in the Ekstraklasa club Górnik Łęczna, where he stayed one and a half seasons. In 2007 returned to FK Pobeda but, after six months, went to another Macedonian club FK Milano Kumanovo. In January 2009 he signed with the Serbian Superliga club FK Banat Zrenjanin. At the end of the 2008–09 season, Banat got relegated. Manevski played in the 2009–10 Serbian First League and at the end of the season he returned to his native Macedonia to play for Macedonian First League runners-up FK Rabotnički. Immediately in his first season he caused sensation by being voted as the Best player of the first half of the 2010–11 season by the internet portal MacedonianFootball.com becoming the first player to receive the award. After a sensational season in the First Macedonian League, he transferred to Chainat Hornbill, Thailand.

== International career ==
After playing for the U-17 and U-19 teams, he was included in the Macedonia national under-21 football team qualifications for the 2006 UEFA European Under-21 Football Championship where he played as an attacking central midfielder.

Manevski made his debut for the Macedonian national team at a tournament played in Iran in November 2005. Five years later, on 3 December 2010, Manevski was selected returned to the Macedonian squad to play a friendly against China on 26 December 2010.

== Honours ==
Vardar

- Macedonian Football League: 2012–13

Rabotnički

- Macedonian Football League: 2013–14
- Macedonian Cup: 2013–14
