= Osa Guobadia =

Nigerian footballer (born 1987)

Personal information
- Date of birth: 1 June 1987 (age 39)
- Place of birth: Benin City, Nigeria
- Height: 1.87 m (6 ft 2 in)
- Position: Midfielder

Senior career*
Years	Team	Apps	(Gls)
2006–2007	SV Pasching	1	(0)
2006	→ FC Wels (loan)	10	(0)
2007	SC Schwanenstadt	6	(1)
2007–2008	SV Pasching		
2008	→ ASV St. Marienkirchen (loan)		
2008–2010	Makedonija G.P.	24	(1)
2010–2011	Kaduna United		
2011–2013	Vardar	33	(2)
2013–2014	Beitar Jerusalem	8	(0)
2014–2015	Balzan	30	(1)
2015–2016	Mosta	24	(6)
2016–2017	Victoria Hotspurs	0	(0)

International career
- Nigeria U20
- * Club domestic league appearances and goals

Osa Guobadia (born 1 June 1987), best known by his nickname Ice-Cream, is a Nigerian former professional footballer who played anywhere across the front line.

== Career ==
After playing with SV Pasching in the Austrian Bundesliga, Guobadia had short spells in other Austrian clubs, namely FC Wels, SC Schwanenstadt and ASV St. Marienkirchen.

In summer 2008 he moved to Macedonia signing with Macedonian First League side FK Makedonija Gjorče Petrov. After two seasons he returned to Nigeria playing one year with Kaduna United F.C. in the Nigeria Premier League, before returning to Macedonia this time to play with another top flight side, FK Vardar.

== Honours ==
FK Makedonija GP

- Macedonian First League: 2008–09

FK Vardar

- Macedonian First League: 2011–12
