= Aleksandar Petrović (footballer, born 1 February 1985) =

Serbian footballer

Personal information
- Full name: Aleksandar Petrović
- Date of birth: 1 February 1985 (age 41)
- Place of birth: Pirot, SFR Yugoslavia
- Height: 1.76 m (5 ft 9 1/2 in)
- Position: Midfielder

Senior career*
Years	Team	Apps	(Gls)
2003–2005	Red Star Belgrade	0	(0)
2003	→ Bežanija (loan)	4	(0)
2004	→ Mladenovac (loan)	12	(0)
2004–2005	→ Hajduk Beograd (loan)	14	(3)
2005–2006	Mladenovac	26	(2)
2006–2007	Hajduk Kula	18	(3)
2007–2008	Shinnik Yaroslavl	3	(0)
2008–2009	Rad	8	(0)
2009–2010	Radnički Obrenovac	12	(3)
2010	→ Metalac Gornji Milanovac (loan)	11	(0)
2010–2011	Hajduk Kula	24	(2)
2011–2013	BSK Borča	37	(2)
2013–2014	Vardar	30	(1)
2014	Voždovac	5	(0)
2015	Kolubara	13	(0)
2015–2016	Radnički Obrenovac	25	(5)
2016–2017	OFK Beograd	16	(0)

International career
2002	FR Yugoslavia U17		
- * Club domestic league appearances and goals

Aleksandar Petrović (Serbian Cyrillic: Александар Петровић; born 1 February 1985), also referred as Aleksandar R. Petrović, is a Serbian retired footballer.

He was part of the FR Yugoslavia U17 team at the 2002 UEFA European Under-17 Championship.

== Achievements ==
Vardar

- Macedonian First Football League: 2012–13
