= Goran Simov =

Serbian footballer

Personal information
- Full name: Goran Simov
- Date of birth: 31 March 1975 (age 51)
- Place of birth: Belgrade, SFR Yugoslavia
- Height: 1.85 m (6 ft 1 in)
- Position: Goalkeeper

Team information
- Current team: Borec Veles (manager)

Youth career
- Čukarički

Senior career*
Years	Team	Apps	(Gls)
1994–1995	Čukarički	0	(0)
1995–1998	Radnički Nova Pazova	75	(0)
1998	Mogren	11	(0)
1999	Radnički Niš	17	(0)
2000–2001	Milicionar	2	(0)
2001–2004	Obilić	19	(0)
2004–2005	→ Hajduk Beograd (loan)	5	(0)
2005–2008	Makedonija G.P.	49	(0)
2008–2009	Sileks	15	(0)
2009–2010	Vardar	25	(0)
2011	Bylis Ballsh	1	(0)
2011–2013	Vardar	27	(0)
2014	TDCS Đồng Tháp	0	(0)
2015–2017	Sileks	7	(0)
Total		253	(0)

Managerial career
- 2019–2021: Sileks
- 2021: Vardar
- 2023: Makedonija G.P.
- 2025-: Borec Veles
- * Club domestic league appearances and goals

Goran Simov (Serbian Cyrillic: Горан Симов; born 31 March 1975) is a Serbian retired football goalkeeper of Macedonian descent who last played with FK Sileks before retiring.

== Career ==
Born in Belgrade, Yugoslav and Serbian capital, he played in the youth team and started his senior career with FK Čukarički. In 1998, he moved to FK Mogren and, after a short half season spell, signed with Radnički Niš. In January 2000, he moved to a Belgrade-based club FK Milicionar. In 2001, he signed with the 1998 national champions FK Obilić. He also played in FK Hajduk Beograd before moving to Macedonia where he played first for FK Makedonija Gjorče Petrov and, since 2008, in FK Sileks, both playing in the Macedonian Prva Liga.

He played with FK Obilić and FK Makedonija Gjorče Petrov in the European competitions.

== Honours ==
Makedonija Gj. P.

- Macedonian Cup: 2005–06

Vardar

- First Macedonian Football League: 2011–12, 2012–13
