= Mite Cikarski =

Macedonian footballer

Personal information
- Date of birth: 6 January 1993 (age 33)
- Place of birth: Strumica, Macedonia
- Height: 1.76 m (5 ft 9 in)
- Position: Left-back

Team information
- Current team: Vardar
- Number: 25

Youth career
- 2010–2011: Partizan

Senior career*
Years	Team	Apps	(Gls)
2011–2014	Vardar	69	(2)
2014–2016	Rabotnichki	52	(4)
2016–2018	Ethnikos Achna	42	(0)
2018	PAS Giannina	12	(0)
2019	Gaz Metan	4	(0)
2020	Akademija Pandev	5	(0)
2020–2022	Botev Plovdiv	28	(1)
2021–2022	Botev Plovdiv II	7	(0)
2022–2023	AP Brera Strumica	14	(1)
2024	Makedonija G.P.	0	(0)
2025–	Vardar	4	(0)

International career^{‡}
2010–2011	Macedonia U19	8	(0)
2012–2014	Macedonia U21	8	(0)
2012–	Macedonia	3	(0)
- * Club domestic league appearances and goals as of 1 June 2025 ‡ National team caps and goals as of 30 March 2016

Mite Cikarski (Macedonian: Мите Цикарски; born 6 January 1993) is a Macedonian professional footballer who plays as a left-back.

== Club career ==
Born in Strumica, Cikarski was playing in Serbia with FK Partizan youth team, when in summer 2011, he was brought to FK Vardar to play in the Macedonian First League. In January 2018, he transferred to PAS Giannina. On 26 February 2019 he released on a free transfer from PAS Giannina.

== International career ==
Cikarski has been a member of the North Macedonia U19 and U21 national teams and made his senior debut for Macedonia in a December 2012 friendly match against Poland and has, as of March 2020, earned a total of 3 caps, scoring no goals.

== Career statistics ==
=== Club ===
As of 26 February 2019

Club	Season	League		Cup		Other		Europe		Total	
Club	Season	Apps	Goals	Apps	Goals	Apps	Goals	Apps	Goals	Apps	Goals
Vardar	2011–12	19	1	2	0	—		0	0	21	1
Vardar	2012–13	28	1	4	0	—		1	0	33	1
Vardar	2013–14	22	0	0	0	—		2	0	24	0
Vardar	Total	69	2	6	0	—		3	0	78	2
Rabotnički	2014–15	23	2	4	0	—		0	0	23	2
Rabotnički	2015–16	29	2	3	0	0	0	8	0	37	2
Rabotnički	2016–17	0	0	0	0	0	0	2	0	2	0
Rabotnički	Total	52	4	7	0	0	0	10	0	69	4
Ethnikos Achna	2016–17	23	0	0	0	0	0	0	0	23	0
Ethnikos Achna	2017–18	19	0	0	0	0	0	0	0	19	0
Ethnikos Achna	Total	42	0	0	0	0	0	0	0	42	0
PAS Giannina	2017–18	5	0	1	0	0	0	0	0	6	0
PAS Giannina	2018–19	7	0	2	0	0	0	0	0	9	0
PAS Giannina	Total	12	0	3	0	0	0	0	0	15	0
Career total		175	6	16	0	0	0	13	0	204	6

== Honours ==
Vardar

- Macedonian First Football League: 2011–12, 2012–13

Rabotnički

- Macedonian Football Cup: 2014–15
