= Football Federation of Macedonia =

Sports governing body

UEFA
- Short name: FFM
- Founded: 14 August 1949; 77 years ago
- Headquarters: Skopje
- FIFA affiliation: 1994
- UEFA affiliation: 1994
- President: Masar Omeragikj
- Website: ffm.mk

The Football Federation of Macedonia – FFM (Macedonian: Фудбалска Федерација на Македонија, ФФМ, romanized: Fudbalska Federacija na Makedonija, FFM) or Football Federation of North Macedonia is the governing body of football in North Macedonia, based in Skopje.

== History ==
The first football department was established as a part of the sports' association of the city of Skopje, after the establishment of the Socialist Republic of Macedonia, part of SFR Yugoslavia. The Football Federation of Macedonia was founded on 14 August 1949 in Skopje as part of the Football Association of Yugoslavia.

After the country proclaimed its independence in 1991, the Football Federation of Macedonia organized its first independent assembly on 7 February 1993. In 1994, then Republic of Macedonia became a full member of FIFA and UEFA.

From 1949 to 2002, it was called the Football Association of Macedonia (Macedonian: Фудбалски Сојуз на Македонија / Fudbalski Sojuz na Makedonija or ФСМ/FSM). The first president was Ljubisav Ivanov - Dzingo. Andon Dončevski was appointed by FFM as the first ever coach of the North Macedonia national team.

== Crest ==
The previous logo used up until 2014.

Macedonian flag on top behind a yellow background. Below, a blue crest with the yellow FFM Cyrillic letters above a football.

On 22 March 2014, the FFM launched a new crest.

== Operations ==
It operates these codes:

- Macedonian First Football League
- Macedonian Second Football League
- Macedonian Third Football League
- Macedonian Municipal Football Leagues
- Macedonian Football Cup
- Macedonian Football Supercup
- Macedonian Women's Football Championship
- Macedonian Women's Football Cup
- North Macedonia national football team
- North Macedonia national under-21 football team
- North Macedonia national under-19 football team
- North Macedonia national under-17 football team
- North Macedonia women's national football team
- North Macedonia national futsal team

== Staff ==
Position	Name
President	Masar Omeragikj
Vice President	Marjan Stojkoski-Manta
General Secretary	Leonid Jandrioski
Match Commissioner	Vasko Dojchinovski
Referee Coordinator	Emil Bozhinovski

== Presidents ==
Nr.	President	Years in power
1.	Ljubisav Ivanov-Dzingo	1993–1999
2.	Lambe Arnaudov	1999–2002
3.	Haralampie Hadži-Risteski	2002–2012
4.	Ilčo Gjorgioski	2012–2018
5.	Muamed Sejdini	2019–2024
6.	Masar Omeragikj	2024–

== See also ==
- Football in North Macedonia
