= Kostadin Zahov =

Macedonian footballer

Personal information
- Full name: Kostadin Zahov
- Date of birth: 8 November 1987 (age 39)
- Place of birth: Strumica, SR Macedonia, SFR Yugoslavia
- Height: 1.85 m (6 ft 1 in)
- Position: Goalkeeper

Team information
- Current team: KF Besa Dobërdoll
- Number: 35

Senior career*
Years	Team	Apps	(Gls)
2005–2011	Belasica	96	(0)
2011–2014	Vardar	52	(0)
2014–2015	Horizont Turnovo	18	(0)
2015–2016	Bregalnica Štip	13	(0)
2016–2024	Shkëndija	185	(0)
2024	FK Voska Sport	14	(0)
2024-2025	KF Besa Dobërdoll	28	(0)

International career^{‡}
2016–	Macedonia	1	(0)
- * Club domestic league appearances and goals as of 1 June 2025 ‡ National team caps and goals as of 18:40, 14 May 2019 (UTC)

Kostadin Zahov (Macedonian: Костадин Захов; born 8 November 1987) is a Macedonian footballer who plays as a goalkeeper for KF Besa Dobërdoll and the Macedonia national team.

== International career ==
Zahov made his debut for Macedonia on 5 September 2016 in a 2018 FIFA World Cup qualification match against Albania, which finished as a 1–2 away loss.

== Career statistics ==
=== International ===
Macedonia
Year	Apps	Goals
2016	1	0
Total	1	0
