= Ostoja Stjepanović =

Macedonian footballer

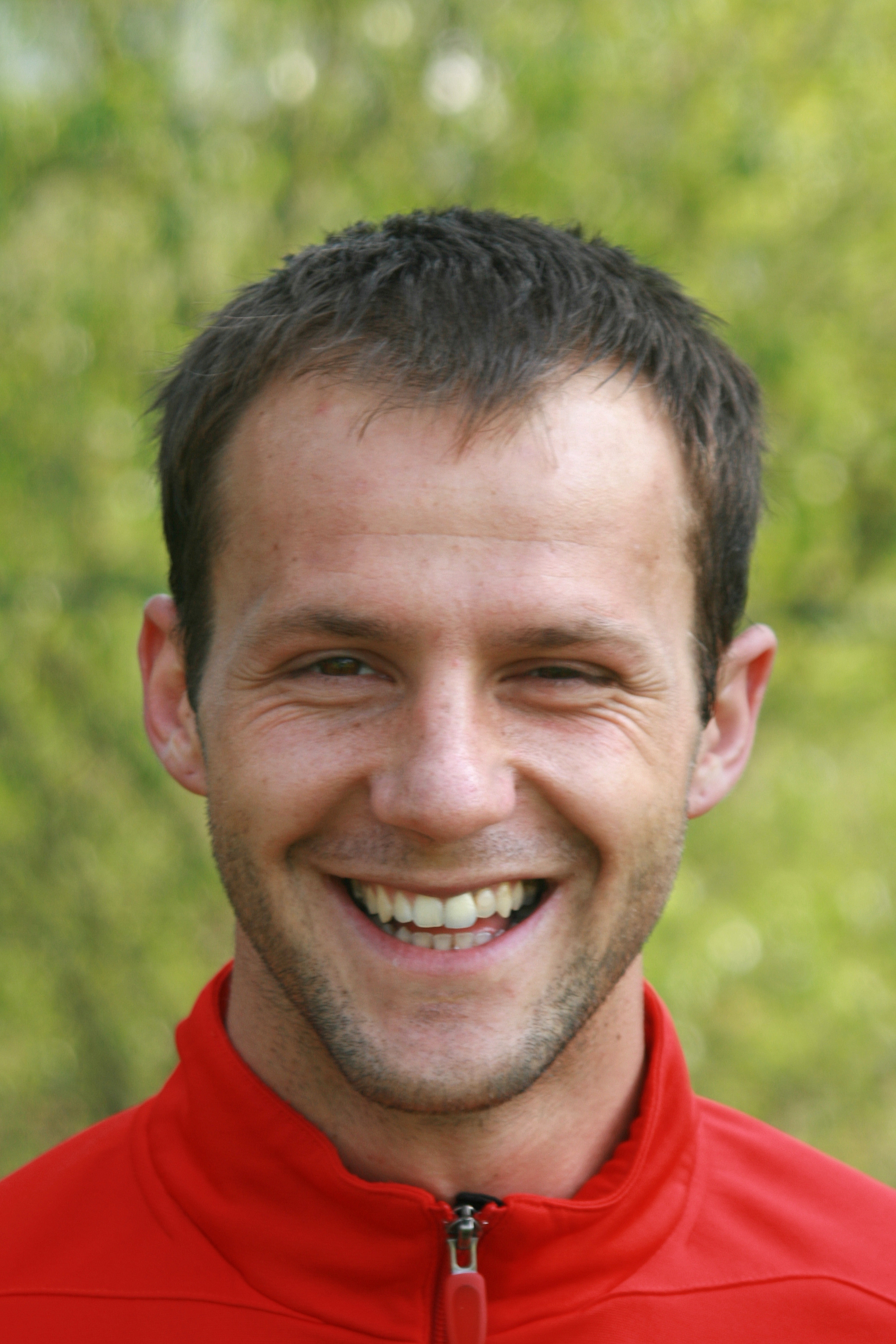
- Stjepanović with SV Mattersburg in 2009

Personal information
- Date of birth: 17 January 1985 (age 41)
- Place of birth: Skopje, SR Macedonia, Yugoslavia
- Height: 1.78 m (5 ft 10 in)
- Position: Midfielder

Youth career
- Makedonija Gjorče Petrov
- 2001–2003: Partizan

Senior career*
Years	Team	Apps	(Gls)
2003–2007	Partizan	0	(0)
2003–2005	→ Teleoptik (loan)	41	(1)
2005–2006	→ Slavija Sarajevo (loan)	17	(0)
2006	→ Dinamo Vranje (loan)	14	(0)
2007	→ Vardar (loan)	29	(4)
2008	Čukarički	19	(2)
2009–2010	SV Mattersburg	28	(1)
2011	Taraz	16	(3)
2011–2013	Vardar	57	(5)
2013–2015	Wisła Kraków	37	(0)
2015	OFK Beograd	14	(0)
2016	AEL Limassol	13	(0)
2016–2017	Śląsk Wrocław	27	(1)
2017–2018	Rabotnički	45	(7)
2019	Makedonija	16	(1)
2019–2020	Rad	15	(0)

International career
2002	Macedonia U17 (Note: Only official UEFA matches included)	2	(0)
2002–2003	Macedonia U19	9	(0)
2012–2017	Macedonia	18	(0)
- * Club domestic league appearances and goals

Ostoja Stjepanović (Macedonian: Остоја Стјепановиќ; born 17 January 1985) is a Macedonian former professional footballer who played as a midfielder.

== Club career ==
Stjepanović agreed to join the Partizan youth system from Makedonija Gjorče Petrov at age 16. He would make his senior debut on loan at Teleoptik in 2003. After spending two seasons with the Serbian League Belgrade side, Stjepanović was sent out on loan to Bosnian club Slavija Sarajevo for the 2005–06 season.

In early 2009, Stjepanović moved to Austria and signed with SV Mattersburg. He spent one and a half seasons with the Bundesliga club. From March to June 2011, Stjepanović played for Kazakhstan Premier League side Taraz.

In August 2011, Stjepanović returned to his homeland and rejoined Vardar. He helped the club win back-to-back championship titles in 2012 and 2013, contributing with five goals in 57 appearances. In July 2013, Stjepanović signed a two-year contract with Polish club Wisła Kraków.

== International career ==
Stjepanović was capped for Macedonia at under-17 and under-19 levels. He made his full international debut for Macedonia on 14 November 2012, coming on as a substitute in a 3–2 home friendly victory over Slovenia. As of April 2020, he has earned 18 caps, scoring no goals.

== Honours ==
Vardar

- Macedonian First League: 2011–12, 2012–13
- Macedonian Cup: 2006–07
