= Igor Stojaković =

Serbian footballer

Personal information
- Full name: Igor Stojaković
- Date of birth: 27 May 1980 (age 46)
- Place of birth: Kraljevo, SFR Yugoslavia
- Height: 1.68 m (5 ft 6 in)
- Position: Midfielder

Senior career*
Years	Team	Apps	(Gls)
1999–2003	Čukarički	95	(6)
2003	Vasalund/Essinge IF	-	(-)
2004–2005	Rad	34	(4)
2005–2006	Budućnost Banatski Dvor	37	(4)
2006–2008	Banat Zrenjanin	39	(4)
2008–2009	Mogren	15	(0)
2009–2011	Javor Ivanjica	53	(2)
2011–2013	Vardar	31	(4)
2013–2017	Javor Ivanjica	78	(9)
2017–2019	Sloga Požega		

International career
1998	FR Yugoslavia U18	4	(0)
2000–2001	FR Yugoslavia U21	4	(0)
- * Club domestic league appearances and goals

Igor Stojaković (Serbian Cyrillic: Игор Стојаковић; born 27 May 1980) is a retired Serbian professional footballer.

== Honours ==
Mogren

- Montenegrin First League: 2008–09

Vardar

- Macedonian First Football League: 2011–12
