= Filip Petrov =

Macedonian footballer (born 1989)

Personal information
- Full name: Filip Petrov; Филип Пeтpoв
- Date of birth: 23 February 1989 (age 37)
- Place of birth: Skopje, SR Macedonia, SFR Yugoslavia
- Height: 1.74 m (5 ft 8 1/2 in)
- Position: Winger

Team information
- Current team: Vardar
- Number: 23

Youth career
- Vardar

Senior career*
Years	Team	Apps	(Gls)
2005–2009	Vardar	65	(7)
2009–2011	Javor Ivanjica	19	(0)
2011–2015	Vardar	110	(22)
2015	Teteks	30	(12)
2016–2017	Pelister	24	(2)
2018	Makedonija		
2019	Borec	9	(0)
2020–2021	Makedonija	33	(4)
2021–	Vardar	10	(1)

International career
2005	Macedonia U-17	3	(0)
2008–2009	Macedonia U-19	20	(2)
2008–2010	Macedonia U-21	10	(2)
- * Club domestic league appearances and goals as of 11 December 2021

Filip Petrov (Macedonian: Филип Пeтpoв, born 23 February 1989) is a Macedonian footballer currently playing for Vardar.

== Club career ==
Born in Skopje, Yugoslavia (today North Macedonia), he is the son of former footballer Mirko Petrov. While playing with the youth team of Vardar, Filip Petrov was regarded as one of the most talented youth players.

After playing as senior with FK Vardar since 2007, Filip decided to move abroad and signed with Serbian SuperLiga club FK Javor Ivanjica in January 2010. After playing one and a half seasons with them, he returned in summer 2011 to his former club, Vardar. At the end of the 2011–12 First Macedonian Football League, beside winning the championship with Vardar, he became the league's top assistant and on 27 July 2012 he was selected for the MPL season best XI by the local football specialised website macedonianfootball.com.

Filip Petrov had played with the Macedonian U-17 and U-19 teams, and since 2009 has been a regular in the Macedonian U-21 team.

Petrov signed with FK Makedonija Gjorče Petrov in May 2018. He then joined FK Borec in January 2019.

== Achievements ==
FK Vardar

- Macedonian First Football League: 3
  - Winner: 2011–12, 2012–13, 2014–15
- Macedonian Football Cup: 1
  - Winner: 2006–07
- Macedonian Football Super Cup: 1
  - Winner: 2013

FK Pelister

- Macedonian Football Cup: 1
  - Winner: 2016–17

== External source ==
- Profile at Srbijafudbal
- Filip Petrov at Utakmica.rs (in Serbian)
- Filip Petrov at Soccerway
