= Miroslav Vajs =

Footballer

Personal information
- Full name: Miroslav Vajs; Мирослав Вајс; Miroslav Weiss
- Date of birth: 27 July 1979 (age 47)
- Place of birth: Skopje, SR Macedonia, SFR Yugoslavia
- Height: 1.83 m (6 ft 0 in)
- Position: Defender

Youth career
- Vardar

Senior career*
Years	Team	Apps	(Gls)
1998–2000	Hajduk Split	8	(0)
2000–2003	Rijeka	36	(0)
2003–2004	Hapoel Be'er Sheva	26	(0)
2004–2008	Rabotnički	73	(5)
2008	Vardar	11	(0)
2009–2011	Metalurg	44	(1)
2011–2013	Vardar	53	(2)

International career^{‡}
2002–2008	Macedonia	9	(0)
- * Club domestic league appearances and goals as of 9 December 2012 ‡ National team caps and goals as of 10 September 2009

Miroslav Vajs or Miroslav Weiss (Macedonian: Мирослав Вајс) (born 27 July 1979) is a retired footballer from the Republic of Macedonia. He played for Macedonian powerhouse Vardar Skopje and has appeared for the Macedonia national football team.

== International career ==
He made his senior debut for Macedonia in a March 2002 friendly match against Bosnia and Herzegovina and has earned a total of 9 caps, scoring no goals. His final international was an August 2008 friendly against Luxembourg.

== Achievements ==
FK Rabotnicki

- Macedonian First League: 3
  - Winner: 2004–05, 2005–06, 2007–08
- Macedonian Football Cup: 1
  - Winner: 2007–08

FK Metalurg Skopje

- Macedonian Football Cup: 1
  - Winner: 2010–11

FK Vardar

- Macedonian First Football League: 2
  - Winner: 2011–12, 2012–13
