= Zlatko Tanevski =

Macedonian retired football defender (born 1983)

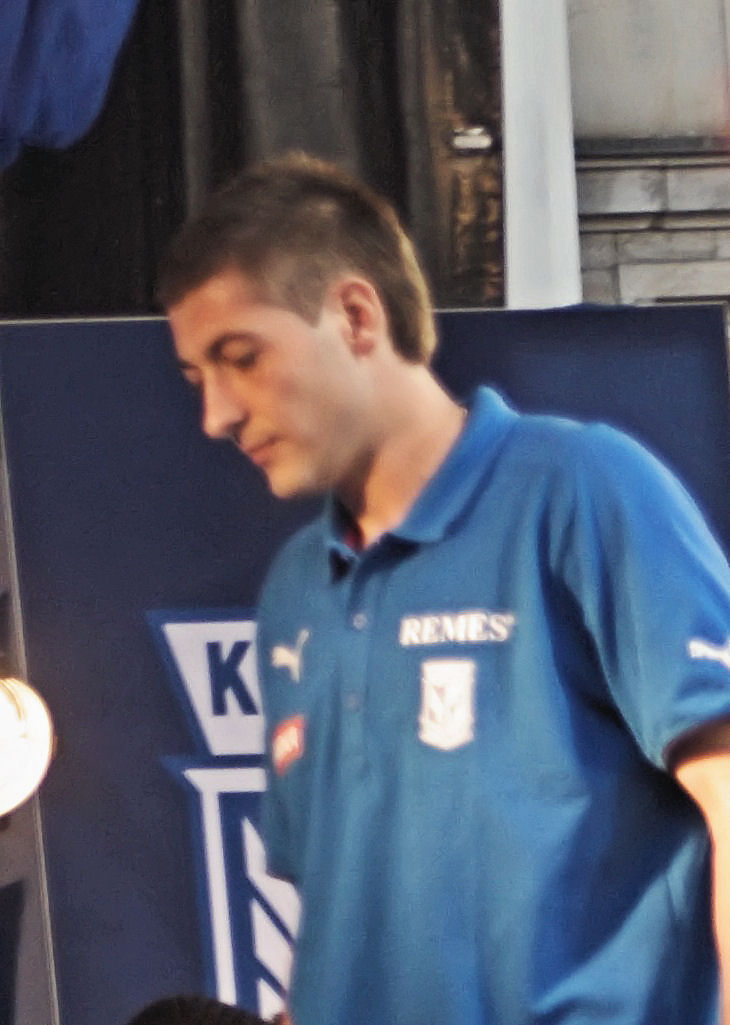

Personal information
- Full name: Zlatko Tanevski
- Date of birth: 3 August 1983 (age 43)
- Place of birth: Skopje, Macedonia
- Height: 1.89 m (6 ft 2 in)
- Position: Defender

Senior career*
Years	Team	Apps	(Gls)
2003–2004	Cementarnica	23	(1)
2004–2006	Vardar	43	(1)
2006–2010	Lech Poznań	44	(1)
2010–2012	GKS Bełchatów	26	(0)
2012–2016	Vardar	77	(6)

International career
2010	Macedonia	1	(0)

Managerial career
- 2020–2022: Vardar (assistant)
- * Club domestic league appearances and goals

Zlatko Tanevski (Macedonian: Златко Таневски; born 3 August 1983) is a Macedonian former professional footballer who played as a defender.

== Club career ==
Tanevski was born in Skopje. He joined Lech Poznań from Vardar Skopje in February 2007. Tanevski also played for Cementarnica Skopje. Tanevski's contract with Lech Poznań expired in the summer of 2010 and he signed with Polish team GKS Bełchatów on 17 June 2010. In January 2012 he rejoined Vardar.

== International career ==
Tanevski made his debut for the Macedonian national team on 22 December 2010 in a friendly away to China, it remained his only international appearance.

== Honours ==
Lech Poznań

- Ekstraklasa: 2009–10
- Polish Cup: 2008–09

FK Vardar

- Macedonian First Football League: 2011–12, 2012–13, 2014–15
- Macedonian Football Supercup: 2013
