= Predrag Ranđelović (footballer, born 1990) =

Macedonian footballer

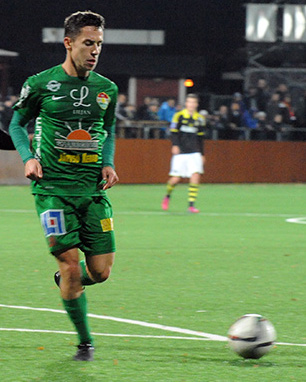
- Ranđelović in action with Dalkurd FF in 2015

Personal information
- Full name: Predrag Ranđelović; Предраг Ранђеловић
- Date of birth: 20 March 1990 (age 36)
- Place of birth: Niš, SFR Yugoslavia
- Height: 1.76 m (5 ft 9 1/2 in)
- Position: Midfielder

Team information
- Current team: Utsikten
- Number: 23

Youth career
- Partizan

Senior career*
Years	Team	Apps	(Gls)
2007–2011	Teleoptik	76	(0)
2011–2013	Vardar	48	(3)
2013	Jagodina	9	(0)
2014	Minsk	29	(2)
2015–2017	Dalkurd	60	(2)
2018	Värnamo	21	(0)
2019–2020	GAIS	24	(1)
2021–	Utsikten	108	(4)

International career
2012	Macedonia U21	3	(0)
2012–2013	Macedonia	3	(0)
- * Club domestic league appearances and goals as of 14 November 2024

Predrag Ranđelović (Serbian Cyrillic: Предраг Ранђеловић, Macedonian: Предраг Ранѓеловиќ; born 20 March 1990) is a Macedonian football player who plays for Utsikten in Sweden and played for the Macedonian national football team between 2012 and 2013.

== Club career ==
Ranđelović came through the youth system of Partizan, before making his senior debut for their affiliated club Teleoptik. He then moved to Macedonian club Vardar in the summer of 2011. In the following two seasons, Ranđelović was a regular member of the team that won back-to-back championship titles in 2012 and 2013.

== International career ==
Born in Serbia, Ranđelović received Macedonian citizenship while playing in the country. He was subsequently called up to the Macedonia U21s in August 2012.

Ranđelović was also capped three times for the senior side of his adopted country, making his debut in a 1–4 friendly loss to Poland on 14 December 2012. His final international was an October 2013 FIFA World Cup qualification match against Serbia.

== Honours ==
Vardar

- Macedonian First League: 2011–12, 2012–13
