= Jovan Kostovski =

Macedonian footballer

Personal information
- Full name: Jovan Kostovski; Јован Костовски
- Date of birth: 19 April 1987 (age 39)
- Place of birth: Skopje, SFR Yugoslavia
- Height: 1.88 m (6 ft 2 in)
- Position: Striker

Senior career*
Years	Team	Apps	(Gls)
2004–2008	Vardar	50	(20)
2008–2009	OFI	17	(2)
2010	Metalurg	12	(0)
2010–2011	Orduspor	31	(6)
2012–2013	Vardar	47	(27)
2013–2019	OH Leuven	120	(34)
2019–2021	Ethnikos Achna	40	(7)
2022	Nacka	13	(12)

International career^{‡}
2005	Macedonia U17	3	(0)
2006–2007	Macedonia U19	8	(1)
2007–2009	Macedonia U21	5	(0)
2012–2016	Macedonia	13	(2)
- * Club domestic league appearances and goals as of 7 June 2021 ‡ National team caps and goals as of 30 March 2016

Jovan Kostovski (Macedonian: Јован Костовски, born 19 April 1987) is a Macedonian footballer who is currently a free agent, after most recently playing as a striker for Nacka.

== International career ==
He made his senior debut for Macedonia in a December 2012 friendly match against Poland and has earned a total of 13 caps, scoring 2 goals. His final international was a March 2016 friendly against Bulgaria.

== International goals ==
Scores and results list Macedonia's goal tally first.

#	Date	Venue	Opponent	Score	Result	Competition
1.	10 September 2013	Philip II Arena, Skopje	Scotland	1–1	1–2	2014 FIFA World Cup qualification
2.	5 March 2014	Philip II Arena, Skopje	Latvia	1–0	2–1	Friendly

== Honours ==
FK Vardar

- First Macedonian Football League: 2011–12, 2012–13
- Macedonian Cup: 2006–07
